= 1980 Kansas City Royals season =

1980 Kansas City Royals
- American League champions American League West champions
- League: American League
- Division: West
- Ballpark: Royals Stadium
- City: Kansas City, Missouri
- Record: 97–65 (.599)
- Divisional place: 1st
- Owners: Ewing Kauffman
- General managers: Joe Burke
- Managers: Jim Frey (first season)
- Television: WDAF-TV 4 (Al Wisk, Denny Trease)
- Radio: WIBW–AM 580; KMBZ–AM 980 (Denny Matthews, Fred White)

The 1980 Kansas City Royals season was their 12th in Major League Baseball. The Royals, under new manager Jim Frey, finished first in the American League West with a record of 97–65. Kansas City finally broke through in the postseason, sweeping the New York Yankees 3–0 in the 1980 American League Championship Series after falling to the Yankees in the ALCS in 1976, 1977 and 1978. The Royals lost to the Philadelphia Phillies 4–2 in the World Series.

George Brett had one of the best seasons in Major League Baseball history. Brett became the first Royals player to win a Most Valuable Player award, and his league-leading .390 batting average was the highest in the majors since Ted Williams hit .406 in 1941. Brett also led the team in home runs (24) and set a single-season franchise record with 118 runs batted in.

== Offseason ==
- October 26, 1979: Keith Drumright was acquired by the Royals from the Houston Astros to complete an earlier deal (the Astros sent a player to be named later to the Royals for George Throop) made on April 27, 1979.
- December 6, 1979: The Royals trade Al Cowens, Todd Cruz and a player to be named later to the California Angels in exchange for Willie Aikens and Rance Mulliniks.
- April 1, 1980: The Angels received Craig Eaton from the Royals, completing the trade of December 6.

== Regular season ==
On September 30, while pitching for the Seattle Mariners against the Royals, Rick Honeycutt taped a thumbtack to his finger to cut the ball. Royals baserunner Willie Wilson spotted the tack from second base. The umpires investigated and not only found the tack, but also a gash in Honeycutt's forehead. Honeycutt was ejected from the game, suspended for 10 games, and fined.

=== Opening Day starters ===
- Willie Aikens
- George Brett
- Clint Hurdle
- Pete LaCock
- Dennis Leonard
- Hal McRae
- Jamie Quirk
- U L Washington
- Frank White
- Willie Wilson

=== Season standings ===
AL West
| Team | W | L | Pct. | GB | Home | Road |
|---|---|---|---|---|---|---|
| Kansas City Royals | 97 | 65 | .599 | — | 49‍–‍32 | 48‍–‍33 |
| Oakland Athletics | 83 | 79 | .512 | 14 | 46‍–‍35 | 37‍–‍44 |
| Minnesota Twins | 77 | 84 | .478 | 19½ | 44‍–‍36 | 33‍–‍48 |
| Texas Rangers | 76 | 85 | .472 | 20½ | 39‍–‍41 | 37‍–‍44 |
| Chicago White Sox | 70 | 90 | .438 | 26 | 37‍–‍42 | 33‍–‍48 |
| California Angels | 65 | 95 | .406 | 31 | 30‍–‍51 | 35‍–‍44 |
| Seattle Mariners | 59 | 103 | .364 | 38 | 36‍–‍45 | 23‍–‍58 |

=== Record vs. opponents ===
1980 American League record Sources:
| Team | BAL | BOS | CAL | CWS | CLE | DET | KC | MIL | MIN | NYY | OAK | SEA | TEX | TOR |
|---|---|---|---|---|---|---|---|---|---|---|---|---|---|---|
| Baltimore | — | 8–5 | 10–2 | 6–6 | 6–7 | 10–3 | 6–6 | 7–6 | 10–2 | 7–6 | 7–5 | 6–6 | 6–6 | 11–2 |
| Boston | 5–8 | — | 9–3 | 6–4 | 7–6 | 8–5 | 5–7 | 6–7 | 6–6 | 3–10 | 9–3 | 7–5 | 5–7 | 7–6 |
| California | 2–10 | 3–9 | — | 3–10 | 4–6 | 5–7 | 5–8 | 6–6 | 7–6 | 2–10 | 3–10 | 11–2 | 11–2 | 3–9 |
| Chicago | 6–6 | 4–6 | 10–3 | — | 5–7 | 2–10 | 5–8 | 5–7 | 5–8 | 5–7 | 6–7 | 6–7 | 6–7–2 | 5–7 |
| Cleveland | 7–6 | 6–7 | 6–4 | 7–5 | — | 3–10 | 5–7 | 3–10 | 9–3 | 5–8 | 6–6 | 8–4 | 6–6 | 8–5 |
| Detroit | 3–10 | 5–8 | 7–5 | 10–2 | 10–3 | — | 2–10 | 7–6 | 6–6 | 5–8 | 6–6 | 10–2–1 | 4–8 | 9–4 |
| Kansas City | 6–6 | 7–5 | 8–5 | 8–5 | 7–5 | 10–2 | — | 6–6 | 5–8 | 8–4 | 6–7 | 7–6 | 10–3 | 9–3 |
| Milwaukee | 6–7 | 7–6 | 6–6 | 7–5 | 10–3 | 6–7 | 6–6 | — | 7–5 | 5–8 | 7–5 | 9–3 | 5–7 | 5–8 |
| Minnesota | 2–10 | 6–6 | 6–7 | 8–5 | 3–9 | 6–6 | 8–5 | 5–7 | — | 4–8 | 6–7 | 7–6 | 9–3 | 7–5 |
| New York | 6–7 | 10–3 | 10–2 | 7–5 | 8–5 | 8–5 | 4–8 | 8–5 | 8–4 | — | 8–4 | 9–3 | 7–5 | 10–3 |
| Oakland | 5–7 | 3–9 | 10–3 | 7–6 | 6–6 | 6–6 | 7–6 | 5–7 | 7–6 | 4–8 | — | 8–5 | 7–6 | 8–4 |
| Seattle | 6–6 | 5–7 | 2–11 | 7–6 | 4–8 | 2–10–1 | 6–7 | 3–9 | 6–7 | 3–9 | 5–8 | — | 4–9 | 6–6 |
| Texas | 6–6 | 7–5 | 2–11 | 7–6–2 | 6–6 | 8–4 | 3–10 | 7–5 | 3–9 | 5–7 | 6–7 | 9–4 | — | 7–5 |
| Toronto | 2–11 | 6–7 | 9–3 | 7–5 | 5–8 | 4–9 | 3–9 | 8–5 | 5–7 | 3–10 | 4–8 | 6–6 | 5–7 | — |

=== Notable transactions ===
- April 5, 1980: Eduardo Rodríguez was released by the Royals.
- June 16, 1980: Mark Huismann was signed by the Royals as an amateur free agent.
- June 17, 1980: Randy McGilberry was traded by the Royals to the New York Mets for Kevin Kobel.
- August 1980: Keith Drumright was purchased from the Royals by the Chicago Cubs.

=== Roster ===
1980 Kansas City Royals
Roster
| Pitchers: 25 Ken Brett; 40 Steve Busby; 28 Craig Chamberlain; 31 Gary Christenson; 35 Rawly Eastwick; 38 Rich Gale; 32 Larry Gura; 50 Mike Jones; 22 Dennis Leonard; 27 Renie Martin; 33 Marty Pattin; 29 Dan Quisenberry; 34 Paul Splittorff; 21 Jeff Twitty | Catchers: 15 Darrell Porter; 12 John Wathan; Infielders: 24 Willie Aikens; 5 George Brett; 17 Manny Castillo; 7 Dave Chalk; 53,2 Onix Concepción; 8 Pete LaCock; 18 Rance Mulliniks; 52 Ken Phelps; 9 Jamie Quirk; 30 U L Washington; 20 Frank White | Outfielders: 3 Steve Braun; 19 José Cardenal; 4 Bob Detherage; 10 Clint Hurdle; 11 Hal McRae; 26 Amos Otis; 1 Jerry Terrell; 2 Rusty Torres; 6 Willie Wilson; Other batters: 23 Germán Barranca | Manager: 41 Jim Frey; Coaches: 36 Billy Connors; 43 Gordon Mackenzie; 42 José Martínez; 44 Jimmie Schaffer |

== Game log ==
=== Regular season ===
Legend
| Royals Win | Royals Loss | Game postponed | Clinched division |

1980 regular season game log: 97–65 (Home: 49–32; Away: 48–33)
April: 10–8 (Home: 7–4; Away: 3–4)

| # | Date | Time (CT) | Opponent | Score | Win | Loss | Save | Time of Game | Attendance | Record | Box/ Streak |
|---|---|---|---|---|---|---|---|---|---|---|---|
| 1 | April 10 | 7:35 p.m. CST | Tigers | L 1–5 | Morris (1–0) | Leonard (0–1) | — | 2:28 | 34,901 | 0–1 | L1 |
| 2 | April 11 | 7:35 p.m. CST | Tigers | W 4–0 | Gura (1–0) | Schatzeder (0–1) | — | 2:13 | 14,605 | 1–1 | W1 |
| 3 | April 12 | 1:35 p.m. CST | Tigers | W 8–6 | Pattin (1–0) | Underwood (0–1) | — | 2:59 | 16,130 | 2–1 | W2 |
| 4 | April 13 | 1:35 p.m. CST | Tigers | W 3–2 | Splittorff (1–0) | Rozema (0–1) | Christenson (1) | 2:29 | 17,720 | 3–1 | W3 |
| 5 | April 15 | 1:00 p.m. CST | @ Orioles | L 2–12 | Palmer (2–0) | Leonard (0–2) | — | 2:32 | 50,199 | 3–2 | L1 |
| 6 | April 16 | 6:30 p.m. CST | @ Orioles | L 1–2 | Flanagan (1–1) | Gura (1–1) | — | 2:16 | 7,473 | 3–3 | L2 |
| 7 | April 17 | 6:30 p.m. CST | @ Orioles | L 2–5 | Stone (1–1) | Gale (0–1) | Stoddard (2) | 2:40 | 7,166 | 3–4 | L3 |
| 8 | April 18 | 12:30 p.m. CST | @ Tigers | W 9–6 (11) | Quisenberry (1–0) | López (0–2) | — | 3:34 | 50,687 | 4–4 | W1 |
| 9 | April 19 | 1:15 p.m. CST | @ Tigers | L 6–8 | Morris (2–1) | Martin (0–1) | — | 2:17 | 13,583 | 4–5 | L1 |
| 10 | April 20 | 12:30 p.m. CST | @ Tigers | W 9–6 | Martin (1–1) | Schatzeder (0–3) | Quisenberry (1) | 2:51 | 18,755 | 5–5 | W1 |
| 11 | April 21 | 7:35 p.m. CST | Blue Jays | L 1–7 | Stieb (2–0) | Gale (0–2) | — | 2:29 | 21,117 | 5–6 | L1 |
| 12 | April 22 | 7:35 p.m. CST | Blue Jays | W 7–2 | Splittorff (2–0) | Mirabella (1–1) | — | 2:08 | 16,993 | 6–6 | W1 |
| 13 | April 23 | 7:35 p.m. CST | Blue Jays | W 7–4 | Christenson (1–0) | McLaughlin (1–1) | Quisenberry (2) | 2:33 | 18,855 | 7–6 | W2 |
| 14 | April 25 | 7:35 p.m. CST | Orioles | W 7–0 | Gura (2–1) | Stone (1–2) | — | 2:18 | 20,436 | 8–6 | W3 |
| 15 | April 26 | 7:35 p.m. CST | Orioles | L 0–4 | Flanagan (2–2) | Gale (0–3) | — | 2:34 | 25,925 | 8–7 | L1 |
| 16 | April 27 | 1:35 p.m. CDT | Orioles | W 3–2 | Splittorff (3–0) | Ford (1–1) | — | 2:02 | 20,496 | 9–7 | W1 |
| — | April 28 | | @ Blue Jays | Postponed (Rain) (Makeup date: August 8) | | | | | | | |
| 17 | April 29 | 6:30 p.m. CDT | @ Blue Jays | L 1–3 | Clancy (1–1) | Leonard (0–3) | — | 2:21 | 11,553 | 9–8 | L1 |
| 18 | April 30 | 6:30 p.m. CDT | @ Blue Jays | W 3–0 | Gura (3–1) | Jefferson (0–1) | — | 1:54 | 14,029 | 10–8 | W1 |

May: 17–10 (Home: 8–4; Away: 9–6)

| # | Date | Time (CT) | Opponent | Score | Win | Loss | Save | Time of Game | Attendance | Record | Box/ Streak |
|---|---|---|---|---|---|---|---|---|---|---|---|
| 19 | May 2 | 7:35 p.m. CDT | Red Sox | L 5–6 (11) | Lockwood (2–1) | Quisenberry (1–1) | — | 3:17 | 25,965 | 10–9 | L2 |
| 20 | May 3 | 7:35 p.m. CDT | Red Sox | L 0–7 | Rainey (1–0) | Splittorff (3–1) | — | 2:30 | 28,760 | 10–10 | L3 |
| 21 | May 4 | 1:35 p.m. CDT | Red Sox | W 5–3 | Leonard (1–3) | Stanley (2–2) | Quisenberry (3) | 2:13 | 24,209 | 11–10 | W1 |
| 22 | May 6 | 7:30 p.m. CDT | @ White Sox | L 0–2 | Wortham (3–0) | Gura (3–2) | Farmer (8) | 2:06 | 7,938 | 11–11 | L1 |
| 23 | May 7 | 7:30 p.m. CDT | @ White Sox | W 12–5 | Christenson (2–0) | Kravec (1–3) | — | 2:54 | 7,584 | 12–11 | W1 |
| 24 | May 8 | 7:30 p.m. CDT | @ White Sox | L 2–8 | Burns (3–2) | Splittorff (3–2) | — | 3:01 | 7,410 | 12–12 | L1 |
| 25 | May 9 | 6:30 p.m. CDT | @ Red Sox | W 6–5 | Leonard (2–3) | Stanley (2–3) | Quisenberry (4) | 2:46 | 28,597 | 13–12 | W1 |
| 26 | May 10 | 1:00 p.m. CDT | @ Red Sox | W 13–8 | Martin (2–1) | Eckersley (1–5) | Pattin (1) | 3:03 | 30,519 | 14–12 | W2 |
| 27 | May 11 | 1:00 p.m. CDT | @ Red Sox | L 2–5 | Rainey (2–0) | Gale (0–4) | — | 2:24 | 24,685 | 14–13 | L1 |
| 28 | May 12 | 7:00 p.m. CDT | @ Yankees | W 12–3 | Gura (4–2) | Tiant (2–2) | Pattin (2) | 2:35 | 17,010 | 15–13 | W1 |
| 29 | May 13 | 7:00 p.m. CDT | @ Yankees | W 4–1 | Martin (3–1) | Griffin (0–2) | Quisenberry (5) | 2:29 | 20,107 | 16–13 | W2 |
| 30 | May 14 | 7:00 p.m. CDT | @ Yankees | L 3–16 | Guidry (3–0) | Leonard (2–4) | Figueroa (1) | 2:58 | 21,953 | 16–14 | L1 |
| 31 | May 16 | 7:35 p.m. CDT | Angels | L 1–11 | Kison (2–4) | Gale (0–5) | — | 3:01 | 22,264 | 16–15 | L2 |
| 32 | May 17 | 7:35 p.m. CDT | Angels | W 2–1 (10) | Gura (5–2) | Clear (0–2) | — | 2:47 | 30,326 | 17–15 | W1 |
| 33 | May 18 | 1:35 p.m. CDT | Angels | W 5–3 | Martin (4–1) | Tanana (2–4) | Quisenberry (6) | 2:24 | 25,382 | 18–15 | W2 |
| 34 | May 19 | 7:35 p.m. CDT | Athletics | W 6–5 (11) | Quisenberry (2–1) | Hamilton (0–1) | — | 3:37 | 28,889 | 19–15 | W3 |
| 35 | May 20 | 7:35 p.m. CDT | Athletics | W 1–0 | Gale (1–5) | Norris (5–2) | Quisenberry (7) | 2:13 | 23,698 | 20–15 | W4 |
| 36 | May 21 | 7:35 p.m. CDT | Athletics | L 2–4 (14) | Lacey (1–0) | Quisenberry (2–2) | — | 4:14 | 24,030 | 20–16 | L1 |
| 37 | May 22 | 7:35 p.m. CDT | Athletics | W 16–3 | Martin (5–1) | Keough (5–4) | — | 2:44 | 23,124 | 21–16 | W1 |
| 38 | May 23 | 9:30 p.m. CDT | @ Angels | W 13–9 | Leonard (3–4) | Tanana (2–5) | — | 3:09 | 26,270 | 22–16 | W2 |
| 39 | May 24 | 9:00 p.m. CDT | @ Angels | W 6–5 (10) | Quisenberry (3–1) | Clear (2–3) | — | 3:32 | 25,382 | 23–16 | W3 |
| 40 | May 25 | 3:00 p.m. CDT | @ Angels | W 7–3 | Gura (6–2) | LaRoche (1–1) | — | 2:32 | 30,325 | 24–16 | W4 |
| 41 | May 26 | 3:30 p.m. CDT | @ Athletics | L 1–4 | Keough (6–4) | Martin (5–2) | — | 2:33 | 21,882 | 24–17 | L1 |
| 42 | May 27 | 9:30 p.m. CDT | @ Athletics | W 4–2 | Leonard (4–4) | Kingman (2–5) | — | 3:03 | 4,488 | 25–17 | W1 |
| 43 | May 28 | 3:30 p.m. CDT | @ Athletics | L 3–6 | Langford (4–3) | Gale (1–6) | — | 2:33 | 4,094 | 25–18 | L1 |
| 44 | May 30 | 7:35 p.m. CDT | White Sox | W 9–2 | Gura (7–2) | Wortham (3–2) | — | 2:29 | 26,500 | 26–18 | W1 |
| 45 | May 31 | 7:35 p.m. CDT | White Sox | W 6–4 | Martin (6–2) | Trout (2–5) | Quisenberry (8) | 3:02 | 29,050 | 27–18 | W2 |

June: 17–12 (Home: 5–7; Away: 12–5)

| # | Date | Time (CT) | Opponent | Score | Win | Loss | Save | Time of Game | Attendance | Record | Box/ Streak |
|---|---|---|---|---|---|---|---|---|---|---|---|
| 46 | June 1 | 1:35 p.m. CDT | White Sox | L 1–6 | Burns (7–3) | Leonard (4–5) | — | 3:03 | 33,428 | 27–19 | L1 |
| 47 | June 2 | 7:35 p.m. CDT | Yankees | L 3–5 | Guidry (6–1) | Splittorff (3–3) | — | 2:42 | 39,261 | 27–20 | L2 |
| 48 | June 3 | 7:35 p.m. CDT | Yankees | W 6–5 (10) | Quisenberry (4–2) | Davis (2–3) | — | 3:17 | 26,734 | 28–20 | W1 |
| 49 | June 4 | 7:35 p.m. CDT | Yankees | W 9–3 | Martin (7–2) | Tiant (4–3) | — | 2:29 | 27,234 | 29–20 | W2 |
| 50 | June 5 | 7:35 p.m. CDT | @ Rangers | W 8–0 | Leonard (5–5) | Kern (2–8) | — | 2:32 | 16,512 | 30–20 | W3 |
| 51 | June 6 | 7:35 p.m. CDT | @ Rangers | W 4–2 | Splittorff (4–3) | Matlack (3–2) | Quisenberry (9) | 2:37 | 26,367 | 31–20 | W4 |
| 52 | June 7 | 7:35 p.m. CDT | @ Rangers | W 7–2 | Gale (2–6) | Perry (3–4) | — | 2:58 | 24,530 | 32–20 | W5 |
| 53 | June 8 | 7:35 p.m. CDT | @ Rangers | W 5–4 | Christenson (3–0) | Babcock (0–1) | Quisenberry (10) | 3:08 | 16,179 | 33–20 | W6 |
| — | June 9 | | @ Indians | Postponed (Rain) (Makeup date: June 11) | | | | | | | |
| 54 | June 10 | 6:35 p.m. CDT | @ Indians | W 8–4 | Pattin (2–0) | Barker (5–4) | — | 3:25 | 6,061 | 34–20 | W7 |
| 55 | June 11 (1) | 4:35 p.m. CDT | @ Indians | W 5–0 | Leonard (6–5) | Waits (4–6) | — | 2:17 | — | 35–20 | W8 |
| 56 | June 11 (2) | 7:27 p.m. CDT | @ Indians | L 5–8 | Spillner (6–3) | Gale (2–7) | — | 2:48 | 13,712 | 35–21 | L1 |
| 57 | June 13 | 7:30 p.m. CDT | @ Brewers | W 4–3 | Gura (7–3) | Keeton (2–1) | Quisenberry (11) | 2:32 | 30,740 | 36–21 | W1 |
| 58 | June 14 | 1:30 p.m. CDT | @ Brewers | L 2–5 | Travers (4–3) | Martin (7–3) | Castro (3) | 2:51 | 50,605 | 36–22 | L1 |
| 59 | June 15 | 1:30 p.m. CDT | @ Brewers | W 7–2 | Leonard (7–5) | Haas (6–6) | — | 2:49 | 28,389 | 37–22 | W1 |
| 60 | June 16 | 7:35 p.m. CDT | Rangers | L 3–6 | Babcock (1–2) | Quisenberry (4–3) | Lyle (7) | 2:25 | 39,457 | 37–23 | L1 |
| 61 | June 17 | 7:35 p.m. CDT | Rangers | W 3–2 | Gale (3–7) | Perry (3–6) | — | 2:45 | 25,324 | 38–23 | W1 |
| 62 | June 18 | 7:35 p.m. CDT | Indians | W 10–2 | Gura (8–3) | Denny (7–5) | — | 2:55 | 23,736 | 39–23 | W2 |
| 63 | June 19 | 7:35 p.m. CDT | Indians | L 4–5 | Barker (7–4) | Martin (7–4) | Stanton (3) | 3:07 | 21,158 | 39–24 | L1 |
| 64 | June 20 | 7:35 p.m. CDT | Brewers | L 5–10 | Haas (7–6) | Leonard (7–6) | Castro (4) | 3:02 | 38,179 | 39–25 | L2 |
| 65 | June 21 | 7:35 p.m. CDT | Brewers | L 1–5 | Sorensen (7–4) | Splittorff (4–4) | — | 2:07 | 40,344 | 39–26 | L3 |
| 66 | June 22 | 1:35 p.m. CDT | Brewers | W 7–4 | Gale (4–7) | Caldwell (6–4) | — | 2:33 | 39,592 | 40–26 | W1 |
| 67 | June 23 | 7:35 p.m. CDT | @ Twins | L 1–4 | Koosman (6–6) | Gura (9–3) | — | 2:23 | 7,525 | 40–27 | L1 |
| 68 | June 24 (1) | 5:05 p.m. CDT | @ Twins | L 1–2 | Jackson (5–4) | Quisenberry (4–4) | — | 2:31 | — | 40–28 | L2 |
| 69 | June 24 (2) | 8:11 p.m. CDT | @ Twins | W 4–2 | Martin (8–4) | Erickson (1–5) | Quisenberry (12) | 2:37 | 11,556 | 41–28 | W1 |
| 70 | June 25 | 7:35 p.m. CDT | @ Twins | W 4–1 | Splittorff (5–4) | Zahn (6–10) | Quisenberry (13) | 2:04 | 9,150 | 42–28 | W2 |
| 71 | June 27 | 9:35 p.m. CDT | @ Mariners | W 2–1 | Gale (5–7) | Honeycutt (7–5) | Quisenberry (14) | 2:28 | 12,099 | 43–28 | W3 |
| 72 | June 28 | 9:35 p.m. CDT | @ Mariners | W 4–2 | Gura (10–3) | Roberts (1–2) | — | 2:11 | 22,154 | 44–28 | W4 |
| 73 | June 29 | 3:35 p.m. CDT | @ Mariners | L 2–7 | Abbott (7–3) | Leonard (7–7) | — | 2:00 | 10,015 | 44–29 | L1 |
| 74 | June 30 | 7:35 p.m. CDT | Twins | L 3–12 | Jackson (6–4) | Martin (8–5) | — | 2:41 | 33,540 | 44–30 | L2 |

July: 18–9 (Home: 12–6; Away: 6–3)

| # | Date | Time (CT) | Opponent | Score | Win | Loss | Save | Time of Game | Attendance | Record | Box/ Streak |
|---|---|---|---|---|---|---|---|---|---|---|---|
| 75 | July 1 | 7:35 p.m. CDT | Twins | L 1–2 | Corbett (5–2) | Splittorff (5–5) | — | 2:20 | 20,224 | 44–31 | L3 |
| 76 | July 2 | 7:35 p.m. CDT | Twins | W 4–3 | Beattie (4–7) | Koosman (6–8) | — | 2:49 | 26,225 | 45–31 | W1 |
| 77 | July 3 | 7:35 p.m. CDT | Mariners | L 2–13 | | Gura (10–4) | Rawley (6) | 2:43 | 21,777 | 45–32 | L1 |
| 78 | July 4 | 7:35 p.m. CDT | Mariners | W 5–3 | Quisenberry (5–4) | Roberts (1–3) | — | 2:23 | 27,891 | 46–32 | W1 |
| 79 | July 5 | 7:35 p.m. CDT | Mariners | W 5–4 | Twitty (1–0) | Parrott (1–10) | Quisenberry (15) | 2:37 | 30,617 | 47–32 | W2 |
| 80 | July 6 | 1:35 p.m. CDT | Mariners | L 3–5 | Bannister (6–6) | Splittorff (5–6) | Rawley (7) | 2:35 | 28,458 | 47–33 | L1 |
51st All-Star Game in Los Angeles, CA
| 81 | July 10 | 7:35 p.m. CDT | Tigers | W 3–2 | Splittorff (6–6) | Wilcox (8–6) | Quisenberry (16) | 2:11 | 23,684 | 48–33 | W1 |
| 82 | July 11 | 7:35 p.m. CDT | Tigers | W 7–3 | Leonard (8–7) | Morris (11–7) | — | 2:18 | 31,017 | 49–33 | W2 |
| 83 | July 12 | 6:30 p.m. CDT | @ Orioles | L 1–3 | Stone (13–3) | Martin (8–6) | Stoddard (12) | 2:46 | 41,514 | 49–34 | L1 |
| 84 | July 13 | 1:00 p.m. CDT | @ Orioles | W 5–1 | Gura (11–4) | Flanagan (8–8) | — | 2:46 | 21,311 | 50–34 | W1 |
| 85 | July 14 | 6:30 p.m. CDT | @ Orioles | W 8–4 | Splittorff (7–6) | McGregor (9–5) | Quisenberry (17) | 2:59 | 23,504 | 51–34 | W2 |
| 86 | July 15 | 6:30 p.m. CDT | @ Red Sox | W 8–4 | Gale (6–7) | Renko (5–3) | — | 2:43 | 26,865 | 52–34 | W3 |
| 87 | July 16 | 6:30 p.m. CDT | @ Red Sox | W 5–1 | Leonard (9–7) | Eckersley (5–8) | Quisenberry (18) | 3:12 | 27,213 | 53–34 | W4 |
| 88 | July 17 | 6:30 p.m. CDT | @ Red Sox | L 4–12 | Tudor (3–1) | Martin (8–7) | — | 2:41 | 25,619 | 53–35 | L1 |
| 89 | July 18 | 7:00 p.m. CDT | @ Yankees | W 13–1 | Gura (12–4) | May (7–4) | — | 2:50 | 44,170 | 54–35 | W1 |
| 90 | July 19 | 7:00 p.m. CDT | @ Yankees | L 7–13 | Bird (1–0) | Splittorff (7–7) | Davis (6) | 3:01 | 53,583 | 54–36 | L1 |
| 91 | July 20 | 1:00 p.m. CDT | @ Yankees | W 14–3 | Gale (7–7) | Guidry (10–6) | Quisenberry (19) | 2:52 | 50,328 | 55–36 | W1 |
| 92 | July 21 | 7:35 p.m. CDT | White Sox | W 2–1 | Leonard (10–7) | Burns (10–8) | Quisenberry (20) | 2:34 | 37,054 | 56–36 | W2 |
| 93 | July 22 | 7:35 p.m. CDT | White Sox | L 1–6 | Trout (5–10) | Busby (0–1) | — | 2:47 | 28,891 | 56–37 | L1 |
| 94 | July 23 | 7:35 p.m. CDT | White Sox | W 9–2 | Gura (13–4) | Baumgarten (2–7) | — | 2:45 | 25,105 | 57–37 | W1 |
| 95 | July 24 | 7:35 p.m. CDT | White Sox | W 12–4 | Splittorff (8–7) | Wortham (4–5) | — | 2:11 | 29,052 | 58–37 | W2 |
| 96 | July 25 | 7:35 p.m. CDT | Yankees | W 6–1 | Gale (8–7) | Tiant (6–4) | — | 2:31 | 40,039 | 59–37 | W3 |
| 97 | July 26 | 7:35 p.m. CDT | Yankees | L 4–5 | Gossage (4–0) | Leonard (10–8) | — | 2:41 | 41,860 | 59–38 | L1 |
| 98 | July 27 | 1:35 p.m. CDT | Yankees | W 8–0 | Gura (14–4) | John (15–4) | — | 2:28 | 40,057 | 60–38 | W1 |
| 99 | July 29 | 7:35 p.m. CDT | Red Sox | W 9–8 | Quisenberry (7–4) | Burgmeier (4–2) | — | 3:08 | 35,042 | 61–38 | W2 |
| 100 | July 30 | 7:35 p.m. CDT | Red Sox | L 1–7 | Stanley (7–6) | Busby (0–2) | — | 2:51 | 31,468 | 61–39 | L1 |
| 101 | July 31 | 7:35 p.m. CDT | Red Sox | W 13–3 | Leonard (11–8) | Eckersley (6–10) | — | 2:28 | 33,500 | 62–39 | W1 |

August: 23–7 (Home: 9–5; Away: 14–2)

| # | Date | Time (CT) | Opponent | Score | Win | Loss | Save | Time of Game | Attendance | Record | Box/ Streak |
|---|---|---|---|---|---|---|---|---|---|---|---|
| 102 | August 1 | 7:30 p.m. CDT | @ White Sox | W 4–3 | Gura (15–4) | Burns (10–9) | Quisenberry (21) | 2:30 | 23,316 | 63–39 | W2 |
| 103 | August 2 | 7:30 p.m. CDT | @ White Sox | W 8–2 | Gale (9–7) | Trout (6–11) | Pattin (3) | 2:39 | 14,905 | 64–39 | W3 |
| 104 | August 3 | 1:15 p.m. CDT | @ White Sox | L 3–5 | Dotson (8–6) | Splittorff (8–8) | — | 2:32 | 14,329 | 64–40 | L1 |
| 105 | August 4 | 7:00 p.m. CDT | @ Tigers | W 6–5 | Quisenberry (8–4) | Schatzeder (6–8) | — | 2:59 | 37,016 | 65–40 | W1 |
| 106 | August 5 | 7:00 p.m. CDT | @ Tigers | W 6–3 | Leonard (12–8) | Wilcox (11–7) | Quisenberry (22) | 2:44 | 27,469 | 66–40 | W2 |
| 107 | August 6 | 7:00 p.m. CDT | @ Tigers | W 5–4 | Gura (16–4) | Morris (12–10) | Quisenberry (23) | 2:56 | 29,115 | 67–40 | W3 |
| 108 | August 8 (1) | 4:30 p.m. CDT | @ Blue Jays | W 9–0 | Gale (10–7) | Clancy (10–8) | — | 2:15 | — | 68–40 | W4 |
| 109 | August 8 (2) | 7:20 p.m. CDT | @ Blue Jays | W 7–4 | Pattin (3–0) | Garvin (3–7) | — | 2:57 | 22,146 | 69–40 | W5 |
| 110 | August 9 | 6:30 p.m. CDT | @ Blue Jays | L 3–4 (14) | Willis (1–0) | Eastwick (0–1) | — | 3:38 | 21,300 | 69–41 | L1 |
| 111 | August 10 | 12:30 p.m. CDT | @ Blue Jays | W 8–5 | Leonard (13–8) | Jefferson (4–9) | Pattin (4) | 2:50 | 23,473 | 70–41 | W1 |
| 112 | August 11 | 7:35 p.m. CDT | Orioles | L 1–2 | Martínez (3–1) | Gura (16–5) | — | 2:33 | 41,334 | 70–42 | L1 |
| 113 | August 12 | 7:35 p.m. CDT | Orioles | W 4–3 | Quisenberry (9–4) | McGregor (13–6) | — | 2:26 | 34,913 | 71–42 | W1 |
| 114 | August 13 | 7:35 p.m. CDT | Orioles | W 6–1 | Gale (11–7) | Palmer (12–9) | — | 2:13 | 35,600 | 72–42 | W2 |
| 115 | August 15 | 7:35 p.m. CDT | Blue Jays | W 4–3 | Leonard (14–8) | Jefferson (4–10) | Quisenberry (24) | 2:24 | 34,861 | 73–42 | W3 |
| 116 | August 16 | 7:35 p.m. CDT | Blue Jays | W 11–5 | Gura (17–5) | Kucek (3–5) | — | 2:45 | 39,631 | 74–42 | W4 |
| 117 | August 17 | 1:35 p.m. CDT | Blue Jays | W 8–3 | Splittorff (9–8) | Clancy (11–9) | Quisenberry (25) | 3:08 | 30,693 | 75–42 | W5 |
| 118 | August 18 | 7:35 p.m. CDT | @ Rangers | W 6–3 | Gale (12–8) | Figueroa (3–7) | Quisenberry (26) | 2:48 | 17,609 | 76–42 | W6 |
| 119 | August 19 | 7:35 p.m. CDT | @ Rangers | W 4–3 | Twitty (2–0) | Darwin (10–2) | Quisenberry (27) | 2:36 | 17,800 | 77–42 | W7 |
| 120 | August 20 | 7:35 p.m. CDT | @ Rangers | W 5–3 (12) | Quisenberry (10–4) | Johnson (0–2) | Martin (1) | 3:21 | 16,996 | 78–42 | W8 |
| 121 | August 21 | 7:35 p.m. CDT | Indians | L 3–4 | Waits (10–11) | Busby (0–3) | Cruz (9) | 2:39 | 32,139 | 78–43 | L1 |
| 122 | August 22 | 7:35 p.m. CDT | Indians | L 1–4 | Barker (15–8) | Splittorff (9–9) | Monge (11) | 2:45 | 34,526 | 78–44 | L2 |
| 123 | August 23 | 7:35 p.m. CDT | Indians | W 3–2 | Gale (13–8) | Garland (6–6) | Quisenberry (28) | 2:21 | 40,192 | 79–44 | W1 |
| 124 | August 24 | 1:35 p.m. CDT | Indians | W 7–5 | Leonard (15–8) | Grimsley (4–3) | Quisenberry (29) | 2:43 | 30,593 | 80–44 | W2 |
| 125 | August 25 | 7:30 p.m. CDT | @ Brewers | W 9–3 | Gura (18–5) | Haas (14–11) | Quisenberry (30) | 2:57 | 15,912 | 81–44 | W3 |
| 126 | August 26 | 7:30 p.m. CDT | @ Brewers | W 7–6 | Busby (1–3) | Caldwell (11–10) | Quisenberry (31) | 2:48 | 16,824 | 82–44 | W4 |
| 127 | August 27 | 7:30 p.m. CDT | @ Brewers | W 5–4 | Splittorff (10–9) | Mitchell (4–3) | Martin (2) | 2:19 | 18,815 | 83–44 | W5 |
| 128 | August 28 | 7:35 p.m. CDT | Rangers | L 6–10 | Rajsich (2–1) | Twitty (2–1) | — | 2:34 | 25,944 | 83–45 | L1 |
| 129 | August 29 | 7:35 p.m. CDT | Rangers | W 7–3 | Leonard (16–8) | Figueroa (3–8) | — | 2:29 | 32,781 | 84–45 | W1 |
| 130 | August 30 | 1:35 p.m. CDT | Rangers | L 5–7 (11) | Johnson (2–2) | Quisenberry (10–5) | — | 3:17 | 34,557 | 84–46 | L1 |
| 131 | August 31 | 1:35 p.m. CDT | Rangers | W 4–3 | Quisenberry (11–5) | Lyle (3–2) | — | 2:41 | 37,390 | 85–46 | W1 |

September: 8–18 (Home: 4–6; Away: 4–12)

| # | Date | Time (CT) | Opponent | Score | Win | Loss | Save | Time of Game | Attendance | Record | Box/ Streak |
|---|---|---|---|---|---|---|---|---|---|---|---|
| 132 | September 1 | 7:35 p.m. CDT | Brewers | L 1–6 | McClure (2–6) | Gale (13–8) | — | 2:49 | 28,597 | 85–47 | L1 |
| 133 | September 3 | 7:35 p.m. CDT | Brewers | L 1–3 (10) | Sorensen (10–8) | Leonard (16–9) | — | 2:46 | 23,037 | 85–48 | L2 |
| 134 | September 4 | 7:35 p.m. CDT | Brewers | L 5–9 | Castro (1–4) | Quisenberry (11–6) | — | 2:43 | 21,898 | 85–49 | L3 |
| 135 | September 5 | 6:35 p.m. CDT | @ Indians | W 2–1 | Splittorff (11–9) | Waits (10–13) | — | 1:51 | 21,808 | 86–49 | W1 |
| 136 | September 6 | 6:35 p.m. CDT | @ Indians | L 3–8 | Barker (18–8) | Martin (8–8) | — | 3:03 | 27,352 | 86–50 | L1 |
| 137 | September 7 | 1:05 p.m. CDT | @ Indians | W 6–4 | Leonard (17–9) | Garland (6–8) | Quisenberry (32) | 2:32 | 8,990 | 87–50 | W1 |
| 138 | September 8 | 9:30 p.m. CDT | @ Angels | L 4–7 | Aase (7–13) | Gura (18–6) | Hassler (6) | 2:53 | 23,050 | 87–51 | L1 |
| 139 | September 9 | 9:30 p.m. CDT | @ Angels | L 3–4 | Tanana (8–10) | Splittorff (11–10) | Clear (9) | 2:16 | 24,131 | 87–52 | L2 |
| 140 | September 10 | 9:30 p.m. CDT | @ Angels | L 3–8 | Aase (8–13) | Martin (8–9) | Hassler (7) | 2:45 | 24,762 | 87–53 | L3 |
| 141 | September 11 | 9:30 p.m. CDT | @ Angels | W 7–2 | Leonard (18–9) | Ferris (0–1) | — | 2:38 | 22,844 | 88–53 | W1 |
| 142 | September 12 | 9:30 p.m. CDT | @ Athletics | L 5–9 | Langford (16–11) | Chamberlain (0–1) | — | 3:05 | 17,440 | 88–54 | L1 |
| 143 | September 13 | 3:30 p.m. CDT | @ Athletics | L 2–6 | McCatty (12–13) | Gura (18–7) | — | 2:37 | 11,253 | 88–55 | L2 |
| 144 | September 14 | 3:30 p.m. CDT | @ Athletics | W 4–3 | Splittorff (12–10) | Kingman (7–18) | Quisenberry (33) | 2:20 | 10,756 | 89–55 | W1 |
| — | September 16 | | Angels | Postponed (Rain) (Makeup date: September 17) | | | | | | | |
| 145 | September 17 (1) | 5:05 p.m. CDT | Angels | W 5–0 | Leonard (19–9) | Botting (0–1) | — | 2:17 | — | 90–55 | W2 |
| 146 | September 17 (2) | 7:57 p.m. CDT | Angels | L 4–7 | LaRoche (3–5) | Gura (18–8) | Hassler (9) | 3:13 | 25,908 | 90–56 | L1 |
| 147 | September 18 | 7:35 p.m. CDT | Angels | W 5–2 | Martin (9–9) | Martínez (6–7) | — | 2:43 | 19,559 | 91–56 | W1 |
| 148 | September 19 | 7:35 p.m. CDT | Athletics | W 13–3 | Splittorff (13–10) | Kingman (7–19) | — | 2:30 | 29,493 | 92–56 | W2 |
| 149 | September 20 | 7:35 p.m. CDT | Athletics | L 0–9 | Keough (16–13) | Jones (0–1) | — | 2:43 | 37,523 | 92–57 | L1 |
| 150 | September 21 | 1:35 p.m. CDT | Athletics | L 3–9 | Norris (21–8) | Leonard (19–10) | — | 2:47 | 41,329 | 92–58 | L2 |
| 151 | September 22 | 9:35 p.m. CDT | @ Mariners | L 4–5 (11) | McLaughlin (3–6) | Quisenberry (11–7) | — | 3:16 | 8,643 | 92–59 | L3 |
| 152 | September 23 | 9:35 p.m. CDT | @ Mariners | L 3–7 | Beattie (5–13) | Martin (9–10) | — | 2:32 | 10,879 | 92–60 | L4 |
| 153 | September 24 | 9:35 p.m. CDT | @ Mariners | L 2–4 | Honeycutt (10–17) | Splittorff (13–11) | Parrott (3) | 2:12 | 11,180 | 92–61 | L5 |
| 154 | September 26 | 7:35 p.m. CDT | @ Twins | L 0–3 | Zahn (13–18) | Leonard (19–11) | — | 2:30 | 9,837 | 92–62 | L6 |
| 155 | September 27 | 10:35 a.m. CDT | @ Twins | L 3–8 | Koosman (15–13) | Gura (18–9) | — | 2:21 | 6,848 | 92–63 | L7 |
| 156 | September 28 | 1:15 p.m. CDT | @ Twins | L 7–8 | Redfern (7–7) | Gale (13–9) | Corbett (22) | 2:42 | 6,938 | 92–64 | L8 |
| 157 | September 30 | 7:35 p.m. CDT | Mariners | W 7–5 (14) | Quisenberry (12–7) | Parrott (1–15) | — | 3:59 | 17,272 | 93–64 | W1 |

October: 4–1 (Home: 4–1; Away: 0–0)

| # | Date | Time (CT) | Opponent | Score | Win | Loss | Save | Time of Game | Attendance | Record | Box/ Streak |
|---|---|---|---|---|---|---|---|---|---|---|---|
| 158 | October 1 | 7:35 p.m. CDT | Mariners | W 4–1 | Pattin (4–0) | Dressler (4–10) | Brett (1) | 2:18 | 15,604 | 94–64 | W2 |
| 159 | October 2 | 7:35 p.m. CDT | Mariners | W 6–2 | Martin (10–10) | Bannister (9–13) | — | 2:23 | 15,241 | 95–64 | W3 |
| 160 | October 3 | 7:35 p.m. CDT | Twins | L 3–5 | Koosman (16–13) | Gura (18–10) | Corbett (23) | 2:29 | 20,714 | 95–65 | L1 |
| 161 | October 4 | 7:35 p.m. CDT | Twins | W 17–1 | Leonard (20–11) | Erickson (7–13) | — | 2:42 | 23,751 | 96–65 | W1 |
| 162 | October 5 | 1:35 p.m. CDT | Twins | W 4–0 | Splittorff (14–11) | Jackson (9–9) | Gale (1) | 2:05 | 25,603 | 97–65 | W2 |

=== Detailed records ===
American League
| Opponent | Home | Away | Total | Pct. | Runs scored | Runs allowed |
AL East
| Baltimore Orioles | 4–2 | 2–4 | 6–6 | 0.500 | 40 | 39 |
| Boston Red Sox | 3–3 | 4–2 | 7–5 | 0.583 | 71 | 69 |
| Milwaukee Brewers | 1–5 | 5–1 | 6–6 | 0.500 | 54 | 60 |
| New York Yankees | 4–2 | 4–2 | 8–4 | 0.667 | 89 | 57 |
| Div Total | 12–12 | 15–9 | 27–21 | 0.563 | 254 | 225 |
AL West
| Kansas City Royals | — | — | — | — | — | — |
| Minnesota Twins | 3–3 | 2–5 | 5–8 | 0.385 | 52 | 51 |
| Oakland Athletics | 4–3 | 2–4 | 6–7 | 0.462 | 60 | 63 |
| Texas Rangers | 3–3 | 7–0 | 10–3 | 0.769 | 67 | 48 |
| Div Total | 10–9 | 11–9 | 21–18 | 0.538 | 179 | 162 |
| Season Total | 22–21 | 26–18 | 48–39 | 0.552 | 433 | 387 |

| Month | Games | Won | Lost | Win % | RS | RA |
|---|---|---|---|---|---|---|
| April | 18 | 10 | 8 | 0.556 | 74 | 74 |
| May | 27 | 17 | 10 | 0.630 | 146 | 131 |
| June | 29 | 17 | 12 | 0.586 | 128 | 114 |
| July | 27 | 18 | 9 | 0.667 | 160 | 114 |
| August | 30 | 23 | 7 | 0.767 | 165 | 113 |
| September | 26 | 8 | 18 | 0.308 | 102 | 140 |
| October | 5 | 4 | 1 | 0.800 | 34 | 9 |
| Total | 162 | 97 | 65 | 0.599 | 809 | 694 |

| | Games | Won | Lost | Win % | RS | RA |
| Home | 81 | 49 | 32 | 0.605 | 397 | 335 |
| Away | 81 | 48 | 33 | 0.593 | 412 | 359 |
| Total | 162 | 97 | 65 | 0.599 | 809 | 694 |

=== Composite Box ===
1980 Kansas City Royals Inning–by–Inning Boxscore
| Team | 1 | 2 | 3 | 4 | 5 | 6 | 7 | 8 | 9 | 10 | 11 | 12 | 13 | 14 | R | H | E |
Opponents
Royals

=== Postseason Game log ===
Legend
| Royals Win | Royals Loss | Game postponed |

1980 Postseason game log: 5–4 (Home: 4–1; Away: 1–3)
AL Championship Series: vs. New York Yankees 3–0 (Home: 2–0; Away: 1–0)

| # | Date | Time (CT) | Opponent | Score | Win | Loss | Save | Time of Game | Attendance | Series | Box/ Streak |
|---|---|---|---|---|---|---|---|---|---|---|---|
| 1 | October 8 | 2:00 p.m. CDT | Yankees | W 7–2 | Gura (1–0) | Guidry (0–1) | — | 3:00 | 42,598 | KC 1–0 | W1 |
| 2 | October 9 | 7:15 p.m. CDT | Yankees | W 3–2 | Leonard (1–0) | May (0–1) | Quisenberry (1) | 2:51 | 42,633 | KC 2–0 | W2 |
| 3 | October 10 | 7:15 p.m. CDT | @ Yankees | W 4–2 | Quisenberry (1–0) | Gossage (0–1) | — | 2:59 | 56,588 | KC 3–0 | W3 |

World Series: vs. Philadelphia Phillies 2–4 (Home: 2–1; Away: 0–3)

| # | Date | Time (CT) | Opponent | Score | Win | Loss | Save | Time of Game | Attendance | Series | Box/ Streak |
|---|---|---|---|---|---|---|---|---|---|---|---|
| 1 | October 14 | 7:30 p.m. CDT | @ Phillies | 6–7 | Walk (1–0) | Leonard (0–1) | McGraw (1) | 3:01 | 65,791 | PHI 1–0 | L1 |
| 2 | October 15 | 7:20 p.m. CDT | @ Phillies | 4–6 | Carlton (1–0) | Quisenberry (0–1) | Reed (1) | 3:01 | 65,775 | PHI 2–0 | L2 |
| 3 | October 17 | 7:30 p.m. CDT | Phillies | 4–3 (10) | Quisenberry (1–1) | McGraw (0–1) | — | 3:19 | 42,380 | PHI 2–1 | W1 |
| 4 | October 18 | 12:45 p.m. CDT | Phillies | 5–3 | Leonard (1–1) | Christenson (0–1) | Quisenberry (1) | 2:37 | 42,363 | TIE 2–2 | W2 |
| 5 | October 19 | 3:30 p.m. CDT | Phillies | 3–4 | McGraw (1–1) | Quisenberry (1–2) | — | 2:51 | 42,369 | PHI 3–2 | L1 |
| 6 | October 21 | 7:20 p.m. CDT | @ Phillies | 1–4 | Carlton (2–0) | Gale (0–1) | McGraw (2) | 3:00 | 65,838 | PHI 4–2 | L2 |

== Starting Lineups ==
=== Regular Season ===
==== Batting Order ====
1980 Regular Season Batting Order game log
April

| # | Date | Opponent | 1st | 2nd | 3rd | 4th | 5th | 6th | 7th | 8th | 9th |
|---|---|---|---|---|---|---|---|---|---|---|---|
| 5 | April 15 | @ BAL | | | | | | | | | |
| 6 | April 16 | @ BAL | | | | | | | | | |
| 7 | April 17 | @ BAL | | | | | | | | | |
| 14 | April 25 | BAL | | | | | | | | | |
| 15 | April 26 | BAL | | | | | | | | | |
| 16 | April 27 | BAL | | | | | | | | | |

May

| # | Date | Opponent | 1st | 2nd | 3rd | 4th | 5th | 6th | 7th | 8th | 9th |
|---|---|---|---|---|---|---|---|---|---|---|---|
| 19 | May 2 | BOS | | | | | | | | | |
| 20 | May 3 | BOS | | | | | | | | | |
| 21 | May 4 | BOS | | | | | | | | | |
| 25 | May 9 | @ BOS | | | | | | | | | |
| 26 | May 10 | @ BOS | | | | | | | | | |
| 27 | May 11 | @ BOS | | | | | | | | | |
| 28 | May 12 | @ NYY | | | | | | | | | |
| 29 | May 13 | @ NYY | | | | | | | | | |
| 30 | May 14 | @ NYY | | | | | | | | | |
| 34 | May 19 | OAK | | | | | | | | | |
| 35 | May 20 | OAK | | | | | | | | | |
| 36 | May 21 | OAK | | | | | | | | | |
| 37 | May 22 | OAK | | | | | | | | | |
| 41 | May 26 | @ OAK | | | | | | | | | |
| 42 | May 27 | @ OAK | | | | | | | | | |
| 43 | May 28 | @ OAK | | | | | | | | | |

June

| # | Date | Opponent | 1st | 2nd | 3rd | 4th | 5th | 6th | 7th | 8th | 9th |
|---|---|---|---|---|---|---|---|---|---|---|---|
| 47 | June 2 | NYY | | | | | | | | | |
| 48 | June 3 | NYY | | | | | | | | | |
| 49 | June 4 | NYY | | | | | | | | | |
| 50 | June 5 | @ TEX | | | | | | | | | |
| 51 | | @ TEX | | | | | | | | | |
| 52 | June 7 | @ TEX | | | | | | | | | |
| 53 | June 8 | @ TEX | | | | | | | | | |
| 57 | June 13 | @ MIL | | | | | | | | | |
| 58 | June 14 | @ MIL | | | | | | | | | |
| 59 | June 15 | @ MIL | | | | | | | | | |
| 60 | June 16 | TEX | | | | | | | | | |
| 61 | June 17 | TEX | | | | | | | | | |
| 64 | June 20 | MIL | | | | | | | | | |
| 65 | June 21 | MIL | | | | | | | | | |
| 66 | June 22 | MIL | | | | | | | | | |
| 67 | June 23 | @ MIN | | | | | | | | | |
| 68 | June 24 | @ MIN | | | | | | | | | |
| 69 | June 24 | @ MIN | | | | | | | | | |
| 70 | June 25 | @ MIN | | | | | | | | | |
| 74 | June 30 | MIN | | | | | | | | | |

July

| # | Date | Opponent | 1st | 2nd | 3rd | 4th | 5th | 6th | 7th | 8th | 9th |
|---|---|---|---|---|---|---|---|---|---|---|---|
| 75 | July 1 | MIN | | | | | | | | | |
| 76 | July 2 | MIN | | | | | | | | | |
| 83 | July 12 | @ BAL | | | | | | | | | |
| 84 | July 13 | @ BAL | | | | | | | | | |
| 85 | July 14 | @ BAL | | | | | | | | | |
| 86 | July 15 | @ BOS | | | | | | | | | |
| 87 | July 16 | @ BOS | | | | | | | | | |
| 88 | July 17 | @ BOS | | | | | | | | | |
| 89 | July 18 | @ NYY | | | | | | | | | |
| 90 | July 19 | @ NYY | | | | | | | | | |
| 91 | July 20 | @ NYY | | | | | | | | | |
| 96 | July 25 | NYY | | | | | | | | | |
| 97 | July 26 | NYY | | | | | | | | | |
| 98 | July 27 | NYY | | | | | | | | | |
| 99 | July 29 | BOS | | | | | | | | | |
| 100 | July 30 | BOS | | | | | | | | | |
| 101 | July 31 | BOS | | | | | | | | | |

August

| # | Date | Opponent | 1st | 2nd | 3rd | 4th | 5th | 6th | 7th | 8th | 9th |
|---|---|---|---|---|---|---|---|---|---|---|---|
| 112 | August 11 | BAL | | | | | | | | | |
| 113 | August 12 | BAL | | | | | | | | | |
| 114 | August 13 | BAL | | | | | | | | | |
| 118 | August 18 | @ TEX | | | | | | | | | |
| 119 | August 19 | @ TEX | | | | | | | | | |
| 120 | August 20 | @ TEX | | | | | | | | | |
| 125 | August 25 | @ MIL | | | | | | | | | |
| 126 | August 26 | @ MIL | | | | | | | | | |
| 127 | August 27 | @ MIL | | | | | | | | | |
| 128 | August 28 | TEX | | | | | | | | | |
| 129 | August 29 | TEX | | | | | | | | | |
| 130 | August 30 | TEX | | | | | | | | | |
| 131 | August 31 | TEX | | | | | | | | | |

September

| # | Date | Opponent | 1st | 2nd | 3rd | 4th | 5th | 6th | 7th | 8th | 9th |
|---|---|---|---|---|---|---|---|---|---|---|---|
| 132 | September 1 | MIL | | | | | | | | | |
| 133 | September 3 | MIL | | | | | | | | | |
| 134 | September 4 | MIL | | | | | | | | | |
| 142 | September 12 | @ OAK | | | | | | | | | |
| 143 | September 13 | @ OAK | | | | | | | | | |
| 144 | September 14 | @ OAK | | | | | | | | | |
| 148 | September 19 | OAK | | | | | | | | | |
| 149 | September 20 | OAK | | | | | | | | | |
| 150 | September 21 | OAK | | | | | | | | | |
| 154 | September 26 | @ MIN | | | | | | | | | |
| 155 | September 27 | @ MIN | | | | | | | | | |
| 156 | September 28 | @ MIN | | | | | | | | | |

October

| # | Date | Opponent | 1st | 2nd | 3rd | 4th | 5th | 6th | 7th | 8th | 9th |
|---|---|---|---|---|---|---|---|---|---|---|---|
| 160 | October 3 | MIN | | | | | | | | | |
| 161 | October 4 | MIN | | | | | | | | | |
| 162 | October 5 | MIN | | | | | | | | | |

==== Defensive Lineup ====
1980 Regular Season Defensive Lineup game log
April

| # | Date | Opponent | C | 1B | 2B | 3B | SS | LF | CF | RF | P |
|---|---|---|---|---|---|---|---|---|---|---|---|
| 5 | April 15 | @ BAL | | | | | | | | | |
| 6 | April 16 | @ BAL | | | | | | | | | |
| 7 | April 17 | @ BAL | | | | | | | | | |
| 14 | April 25 | BAL | | | | | | | | | |
| 15 | April 26 | BAL | | | | | | | | | |
| 16 | April 27 | BAL | | | | | | | | | |

May

| # | Date | Opponent | C | 1B | 2B | 3B | SS | LF | CF | RF | P |
|---|---|---|---|---|---|---|---|---|---|---|---|
| 19 | May 2 | BOS | | | | | | | | | |
| 20 | May 3 | BOS | | | | | | | | | |
| 21 | May 4 | BOS | | | | | | | | | |
| 25 | May 9 | @ BOS | | | | | | | | | |
| 26 | May 10 | @ BOS | | | | | | | | | |
| 27 | May 11 | @ BOS | | | | | | | | | |
| 28 | May 12 | @ NYY | | | | | | | | | |
| 29 | May 13 | @ NYY | | | | | | | | | |
| 30 | May 14 | @ NYY | | | | | | | | | |
| 34 | May 19 | OAK | | | | | | | | | |
| 35 | May 20 | OAK | | | | | | | | | |
| 36 | May 21 | OAK | | | | | | | | | |
| 37 | May 22 | OAK | | | | | | | | | |
| 41 | May 26 | @ OAK | | | | | | | | | |
| 42 | May 27 | @ OAK | | | | | | | | | |
| 43 | May 28 | @ OAK | | | | | | | | | |

June

| # | Date | Opponent | C | 1B | 2B | 3B | SS | LF | CF | RF | P |
|---|---|---|---|---|---|---|---|---|---|---|---|
| 47 | June 2 | NYY | | | | | | | | | |
| 48 | June 3 | NYY | | | | | | | | | |
| 49 | June 4 | NYY | | | | | | | | | |
| 50 | June 5 | @ TEX | | | | | | | | | |
| 51 | | @ TEX | | | | | | | | | |
| 52 | June 7 | @ TEX | | | | | | | | | |
| 53 | June 8 | @ TEX | | | | | | | | | |
| 57 | June 13 | @ MIL | | | | | | | | | |
| 58 | June 14 | @ MIL | | | | | | | | | |
| 59 | June 15 | @ MIL | | | | | | | | | |
| 60 | June 16 | TEX | | | | | | | | | |
| 61 | June 17 | TEX | | | | | | | | | |
| 64 | June 20 | MIL | | | | | | | | | |
| 65 | June 21 | MIL | | | | | | | | | |
| 66 | June 22 | MIL | | | | | | | | | |
| 67 | June 23 | @ MIN | | | | | | | | | |
| 68 | June 24 | @ MIN | | | | | | | | | |
| 69 | June 24 | @ MIN | | | | | | | | | |
| 70 | June 25 | @ MIN | | | | | | | | | |
| 74 | June 30 | MIN | | | | | | | | | |

July

| # | Date | Opponent | C | 1B | 2B | 3B | SS | LF | CF | RF | P |
|---|---|---|---|---|---|---|---|---|---|---|---|
| 75 | July 1 | MIN | | | | | | | | | |
| 76 | July 2 | MIN | | | | | | | | | |
| 83 | July 12 | @ BAL | | | | | | | | | |
| 84 | July 13 | @ BAL | | | | | | | | | |
| 85 | July 14 | @ BAL | | | | | | | | | |
| 86 | July 15 | @ BOS | | | | | | | | | |
| 87 | July 16 | @ BOS | | | | | | | | | |
| 88 | July 17 | @ BOS | | | | | | | | | |
| 89 | July 18 | @ NYY | | | | | | | | | |
| 90 | July 19 | @ NYY | | | | | | | | | |
| 91 | July 20 | @ NYY | | | | | | | | | |
| 96 | July 25 | NYY | | | | | | | | | |
| 97 | July 26 | NYY | | | | | | | | | |
| 98 | July 27 | NYY | | | | | | | | | |
| 99 | July 29 | BOS | | | | | | | | | |
| 100 | July 30 | BOS | | | | | | | | | |
| 101 | July 31 | BOS | | | | | | | | | |

August

| # | Date | Opponent | C | 1B | 2B | 3B | SS | LF | CF | RF | P |
|---|---|---|---|---|---|---|---|---|---|---|---|
| 112 | August 11 | BAL | | | | | | | | | |
| 113 | August 12 | BAL | | | | | | | | | |
| 114 | August 13 | BAL | | | | | | | | | |
| 118 | August 18 | @ TEX | | | | | | | | | |
| 119 | August 19 | @ TEX | | | | | | | | | |
| 120 | August 20 | @ TEX | | | | | | | | | |
| 125 | August 25 | @ MIL | | | | | | | | | |
| 126 | August 26 | @ MIL | | | | | | | | | |
| 127 | August 27 | @ MIL | | | | | | | | | |
| 128 | August 28 | TEX | | | | | | | | | |
| 129 | August 29 | TEX | | | | | | | | | |
| 130 | August 30 | TEX | | | | | | | | | |
| 131 | August 31 | TEX | | | | | | | | | |

September

| # | Date | Opponent | C | 1B | 2B | 3B | SS | LF | CF | RF | P |
|---|---|---|---|---|---|---|---|---|---|---|---|
| 132 | September 1 | MIL | | | | | | | | | |
| 133 | September 3 | MIL | | | | | | | | | |
| 134 | September 4 | MIL | | | | | | | | | |
| 142 | September 12 | @ OAK | | | | | | | | | |
| 143 | September 13 | @ OAK | | | | | | | | | |
| 144 | September 14 | @ OAK | | | | | | | | | |
| 148 | September 19 | OAK | | | | | | | | | |
| 149 | September 20 | OAK | | | | | | | | | |
| 150 | September 21 | OAK | | | | | | | | | |
| 154 | September 26 | @ MIN | | | | | | | | | |
| 155 | September 27 | @ MIN | | | | | | | | | |
| 156 | September 28 | @ MIN | | | | | | | | | |

October

| # | Date | Opponent | C | 1B | 2B | 3B | SS | LF | CF | RF | P |
|---|---|---|---|---|---|---|---|---|---|---|---|
| 160 | October 3 | MIN | | | | | | | | | |
| 161 | October 4 | MIN | | | | | | | | | |
| 162 | October 5 | MIN | | | | | | | | | |

=== Postseason ===
==== Batting Order ====
1980 Postseason Batting Order game log
AL Championship Series: vs. New York Yankees

| # | Date | Opponent | 1st | 2nd | 3rd | 4th | 5th | 6th | 7th | 8th | 9th |
|---|---|---|---|---|---|---|---|---|---|---|---|
| 1 | October 8 | NYY | | | | | | | | | |
| 2 | October 9 | NYY | | | | | | | | | |
| 3 | October 10 | @ NYY | | | | | | | | | |

World Series: vs. Philadelphia Phillies

| # | Date | Opponent | 1st | 2nd | 3rd | 4th | 5th | 6th | 7th | 8th | 9th |
|---|---|---|---|---|---|---|---|---|---|---|---|
| 1 | October 14 | @ PHI | | | | | | | | | |
| 2 | October 15 | @ PHI | | | | | | | | | |
| 3 | October 17 | PHI | | | | | | | | | |
| 4 | October 18 | PHI | | | | | | | | | |
| 5 | October 19 | PHI | | | | | | | | | |
| 6 | October 21 | @ PHI | | | | | | | | | |

==== Defensive Lineup ====
1980 Postseason Defensive Lineup game log
AL Championship Series: vs. New York Yankees

| # | Date | Opponent | C | 1B | 2B | 3B | SS | LF | CF | RF | P | | | | | | | |
|---|---|---|---|---|---|---|---|---|---|---|---|---|---|---|---|---|---|---|
| 1 | October 8 | NYY | | | | | | | | | style="background:#bfb;" | 2 | October 9 | NYY | style="background:#bfb;" | 3 | October 10 | @ NYY |

World Series: vs. Philadelphia Phillies

| # | Date | Opponent | C | 1B | 2B | 3B | SS | LF | CF | RF | P |
|---|---|---|---|---|---|---|---|---|---|---|---|
| 1 | October 14 | @ PHI | | | | | | | | | |
| 2 | October 15 | @ PHI | | | | | | | | | |
| 3 | October 17 | PHI | | | | | | | | | |
| 4 | October 18 | PHI | | | | | | | | | |
| 5 | October 19 | PHI | | | | | | | | | |
| 6 | October 21 | @ PHI | | | | | | | | | |

== Game Umpires ==
=== Regular Season ===
1980 Regular Season Umpire game log
April

| # | Date | Opponent | HP | 1B | 2B | 3B |
|---|---|---|---|---|---|---|
| 5 | April 15 | @ BAL | #31; Mike Reilly | #6; Jerry Neudecker (crew chief) | #17; Bill Deegan | #19; Rich Garcia |
| 6 | April 16 | @ BAL | #6; Jerry Neudecker (crew chief) | #17; Bill Deegan | #19; Rich Garcia | #31; Mike Reilly |
| 7 | April 17 | @ BAL | #17; Bill Deegan | #19; Rich Garcia | #31; Mike Reilly | #6; Jerry Neudecker (crew chief) |
| 14 | April 25 | BAL | #18; Greg Kosc | #11; Don Denkinger (crew chief) | #10; Larry McCoy | #20; Dale Ford |
| 15 | April 26 | BAL | #11; Don Denkinger (crew chief) | #10; Larry McCoy | #20; Dale Ford | #18; Greg Kosc |
| 16 | April 27 | BAL | #10; Larry McCoy | #20; Dale Ford | #18; Greg Kosc | #11; Don Denkinger (crew chief) |

May

| # | Date | Opponent | HP | 1B | 2B | 3B |
|---|---|---|---|---|---|---|
| 19 | May 2 | BOS | #19; Rich Garcia | #31; Mike Reilly | #6; Jerry Neudecker (crew chief) | #17; Bill Deegan |
| 20 | May 3 | BOS | #31; Mike Reilly | #6; Jerry Neudecker (crew chief) | #17; Bill Deegan | #19; Rich Garcia |
| 21 | May 4 | BOS | #6; Jerry Neudecker (crew chief) | #17; Bill Deegan | #19; Rich Garcia | #31; Mike Reilly |
| 25 | May 9 | @ BOS | #3; Jim Evans | #8; Jim McKean | #35; Ted Hendry | #22; Larry Barnett (crew chief) |
| 26 | May 10 | @ BOS | #8; Jim McKean | #35; Ted Hendry | #22; Larry Barnett (crew chief) | #3; Jim Evans |
| 27 | May 11 | @ BOS | #35; Ted Hendry | #22; Larry Barnett (crew chief) | #3; Jim Evans | #8; Jim McKean |
| 28 | May 12 | @ NYY | #7; Dave Phillips | #12; Lou DiMuro (crew chief) | #24; Al Clark | #14; Steve Palermo |
| 29 | May 13 | @ NYY | #12; Lou DiMuro (crew chief) | #24; Al Clark | (none) | #14; Steve Palermo |
| 30 | May 14 | @ NYY | #24; Al Clark | #14; Steve Palermo | (none) | #12; Lou DiMuro (crew chief) |
| 34 | May 19 | OAK | #5; Russ Goetz | #28; George Maloney | #26; Vic Voltaggio | #1; Bill Haller (crew chief) |
| 35 | May 20 | OAK | #28; George Maloney | #26; Vic Voltaggio | #1; Bill Haller (crew chief) | #5; Russ Goetz |
| 36 | May 21 | OAK | #26; Vic Voltaggio | #1; Bill Haller (crew chief) | #5; Russ Goetz | #28; George Maloney |
| 37 | May 22 | OAK | #1; Bill Haller (crew chief) | #5; Russ Goetz | #28; George Maloney | #26; Vic Voltaggio |
| 41 | May 26 | @ OAK | #13; Derryl Cousins | #24; Al Clark | #7; Dave Phillips (crew chief) | #14; Steve Palermo |
| 42 | May 27 | @ OAK | #24; Al Clark | #7; Dave Phillips (crew chief) | #14; Steve Palermo | #13; Derryl Cousins |
| 43 | May 28 | @ OAK | #7; Dave Phillips (crew chief) | #14; Steve Palermo | #13; Derryl Cousins | #24; Al Clark |

June

| # | Date | Opponent | HP | 1B | 2B | 3B |
|---|---|---|---|---|---|---|
| 47 | June 2 | NYY | #7; Dave Phillips (crew chief) | #14; Steve Palermo | #13; Derryl Cousins | #24; Al Clark |
| 48 | June 3 | NYY | #14; Steve Palermo | #13; Derryl Cousins | #24; Al Clark | #7; Dave Phillips (crew chief) |
| 49 | June 4 | NYY | #13; Derryl Cousins | #24; Al Clark | #7; Dave Phillips (crew chief) | #14; Steve Palermo |
| 50 | June 5 | @ TEX | #4; Marty Springstead (crew chief) | #15; Joe Brinkman | #2; Nick Bremigan | #33; Durwood Merrill |
| 51 | June 6 | @ TEX | #15; Joe Brinkman | #2; Nick Bremigan | #33; Durwood Merrill | #4; Marty Springstead (crew chief) |
| 52 | June 7 | @ TEX | #2; Nick Bremigan | #33; Durwood Merrill | #4; Marty Springstead (crew chief) | #15; Joe Brinkman |
| 53 | June 8 | @ TEX | #33; Durwood Merrill | #4; Marty Springstead (crew chief) | #15; Joe Brinkman | #2; Nick Bremigan |
| 57 | June 13 | @ MIL | #1; Bill Haller (crew chief) | #26; Vic Voltaggio | #5; Russ Goetz | #28; George Maloney |
| 58 | June 14 | @ MIL | #26; Vic Voltaggio | #5; Russ Goetz | #28; George Maloney | #1; Bill Haller (crew chief) |
| 59 | June 15 | @ MIL | #5; Russ Goetz | #28; George Maloney | #1; Bill Haller (crew chief) | #26; Vic Voltaggio |
| 60 | June 16 | TEX | #20; Dale Ford | #12; Terry Cooney (crew chief) | #21; Ken Kaiser | #32; Fred Spenn |
| 61 | June 17 | TEX | #12; Terry Cooney (crew chief) | #21; Ken Kaiser | #32; Fred Spenn | #20; Dale Ford |
| 64 | June 20 | MIL | #20; Dale Ford | #12; Terry Cooney (crew chief) | #21; Ken Kaiser | #32; Fred Spenn |
| 65 | June 21 | MIL | #12; Terry Cooney (crew chief) | #21; Ken Kaiser | #32; Fred Spenn | #20; Dale Ford |
| 66 | June 22 | MIL | #21; Ken Kaiser | #32; Fred Spenn | #20; Dale Ford | #12; Terry Cooney (crew chief) |
| 67 | June 23 | @ MIN | #31; Mike Reilly | #27; Rocky Roe | #19; Rich Garcia | #6; Jerry Neudecker (crew chief) |
| 68 | June 24 | @ MIN | #27; Rocky Roe | #19; Rich Garcia | #6; Jerry Neudecker (crew chief) | #31; Mike Reilly |
| 69 | June 24 | @ MIN | #19; Rich Garcia | #6; Jerry Neudecker (crew chief) | #31; Mike Reilly | #27; Rocky Roe |
| 70 | June 25 | @ MIN | #6; Jerry Neudecker (crew chief) | #31; Mike Reilly | #27; Rocky Roe | #19; Rich Garcia |
| 74 | June 30 | MIN | #34; Dan Morrison | #7; Dave Phillips (crew chief) | #14; Steve Palermo | #24; Al Clark |

July

| # | Date | Opponent | HP | 1B | 2B | 3B |
|---|---|---|---|---|---|---|
| 75 | July 1 | MIN | #7; Dave Phillips (crew chief) | #14; Steve Palermo | #24; Al Clark | #34; Dan Morrison |
| 76 | July 2 | MIN | #14; Steve Palermo | #24; Al Clark | #34; Dan Morrison | #7; Dave Phillips (crew chief) |
| 83 | July 12 | @ BAL | #14; Steve Palermo | #24; Al Clark | #7; Dave Phillips (crew chief) | #10; Larry McCoy |
| 84 | July 13 | @ BAL | #24; Al Clark | #7; Dave Phillips (crew chief) | #10; Larry McCoy | #14; Steve Palermo |
| 85 | July 14 | @ BAL | #7; Dave Phillips (crew chief) | #10; Larry McCoy | #14; Steve Palermo | #24; Al Clark |
| 86 | July 15 | @ BOS | #9; Bill Kunkel (crew chief) | #35; Ted Hendry | #29; John Shulock | #12; Terry Cooney |
| 87 | July 16 | @ BOS | #35; Ted Hendry | #29; John Shulock | #12; Terry Cooney | #9; Bill Kunkel (crew chief) |
| 88 | July 17 | @ BOS | #29; John Shulock | #12; Terry Cooney | #9; Bill Kunkel (crew chief) | #35; Ted Hendry |
| 89 | July 18 | @ NYY | #7; Dave Phillips (crew chief) | #10; Larry McCoy | #14; Steve Palermo | #24; Al Clark |
| 90 | July 19 | @ NYY | #10; Larry McCoy | #14; Steve Palermo | #24; Al Clark | #7; Dave Phillips (crew chief) |
| 91 | July 20 | @ NYY | #14; Steve Palermo | #24; Al Clark | #7; Dave Phillips (crew chief) | #10; Larry McCoy |
| 96 | July 25 | NYY | #33; Durwood Merrill | #13; Derryl Cousins | #4; Marty Springstead (crew chief) | #15; Joe Brinkman |
| 97 | July 26 | NYY | #13; Derryl Cousins | #4; Marty Springstead (crew chief) | #15; Joe Brinkman | #33; Durwood Merrill |
| 98 | July 27 | NYY | #4; Marty Springstead (crew chief) | #15; Joe Brinkman | #33; Durwood Merrill | #13; Derryl Cousins |
| 99 | July 29 | BOS | #15; Joe Brinkman | #33; Durwood Merrill | #13; Derryl Cousins | #4; Marty Springstead (crew chief) |
| 100 | July 30 | BOS | #33; Durwood Merrill | #13; Derryl Cousins | #4; Marty Springstead (crew chief) | #15; Joe Brinkman |
| 101 | July 31 | BOS | #13; Derryl Cousins | #4; Marty Springstead (crew chief) | #15; Joe Brinkman | #33; Durwood Merrill |

August

| # | Date | Opponent | HP | 1B | 2B | 3B |
|---|---|---|---|---|---|---|
| 112 | August 11 | BAL | #30; Dallas Parks | #31; Mike Reilly | #23; Rick Reed | #28; George Maloney (crew chief) |
| 113 | August 12 | BAL | #31; Mike Reilly | #23; Rick Reed | #28; George Maloney (crew chief) | #30; Dallas Parks |
| 114 | August 13 | BAL | #23; Rick Reed | #28; George Maloney (crew chief) | #30; Dallas Parks | #31; Mike Reilly |
| 118 | August 18 | @ TEX | #8; Jim McKean | #22; Larry Barnett (crew chief) | (none) | #2; Nick Bremigan |
| 119 | August 19 | @ TEX | #3; Jim Evans | #22; Larry Barnett (crew chief) | #2; Nick Bremigan | #8; Jim McKean |
| 120 | August 20 | @ TEX | #22; Larry Barnett (crew chief) | #2; Nick Bremigan | #8; Jim McKean | #3; Jim Evans |
| 125 | August 25 | @ MIL | #2; Nick Bremigan | #8; Jim McKean | #3; Jim Evans | #22; Larry Barnett (crew chief) |
| 126 | August 26 | @ MIL | #8; Jim McKean | #3; Jim Evans | #22; Larry Barnett (crew chief) | #2; Nick Bremigan |
| 127 | August 27 | @ MIL | #3; Jim Evans | #22; Larry Barnett (crew chief) | #2; Nick Bremigan | #8; Jim McKean |
| 128 | August 28 | TEX | #5; Russ Goetz (crew chief) | #34; Dan Morrison | #21; Ken Kaiser | #25; Mark Johnson |
| 129 | August 29 | TEX | #34; Dan Morrison | #21; Ken Kaiser | #25; Mark Johnson | #5; Russ Goetz (crew chief) |
| 130 | August 30 | TEX | #21; Ken Kaiser | #25; Mark Johnson | #5; Russ Goetz (crew chief) | #34; Dan Morrison |
| 131 | August 31 | TEX | #25; Mark Johnson | #5; Russ Goetz (crew chief) | #34; Dan Morrison | #21; Ken Kaiser |

September

| # | Date | Opponent | HP | 1B | 2B | 3B |
|---|---|---|---|---|---|---|
| 132 | September 1 | MIL | #5; Russ Goetz (crew chief) | #21; Ken Kaiser | (none) | #25; Mark Johnson |
| 133 | September 3 | MIL | #1; Bill Haller (crew chief) | #21; Ken Kaiser | #25; Mark Johnson | #5; Russ Goetz |
| 134 | September 4 | MIL | #21; Ken Kaiser | #25; Mark Johnson | #5; Russ Goetz | #1; Bill Haller (crew chief) |
| 142 | September 12 | @ OAK | #8; Jim McKean | #22; Larry Barnett (crew chief) | #3; Jim Evans | #2; Nick Bremigan |
| 143 | September 13 | @ OAK | #22; Larry Barnett (crew chief) | #3; Jim Evans | #2; Nick Bremigan | #8; Jim McKean |
| 144 | September 14 | @ OAK | #3; Jim Evans | #2; Nick Bremigan | #8; Jim McKean | #22; Larry Barnett (crew chief) |
| 148 | September 19 | OAK | #18; Greg Kosc | #19; Rich Garcia | #11; Don Denkinger (crew chief) | #20; Dale Ford |
| 149 | September 20 | OAK | #19; Rich Garcia | #11; Don Denkinger (crew chief) | #20; Dale Ford | #18; Greg Kosc |
| 150 | September 21 | OAK | #11; Don Denkinger (crew chief) | #20; Dale Ford | #18; Greg Kosc | #19; Rich Garcia |
| 154 | September 26 | @ MIN | #21; Ken Kaiser | #1; Bill Haller (crew chief) | (none) | #31; Mike Reilly |
| 155 | September 27 | @ MIN | #1; Bill Haller (crew chief) | #31; Mike Reilly | (none) | #21; Ken Kaiser |
| 156 | September 28 | @ MIN | #31; Mike Reilly | #21; Ken Kaiser | (none) | #1; Bill Haller (crew chief) |

October

| # | Date | Opponent | HP | 1B | 2B | 3B |
|---|---|---|---|---|---|---|
| 160 | October 3 | MIN | #18; Greg Kosc | #19; Rich Garcia | #11; Don Denkinger (crew chief) | #20; Dale Ford |
| 161 | October 4 | MIN | #19; Rich Garcia | #11; Don Denkinger (crew chief) | #20; Dale Ford | #18; Greg Kosc |
| 162 | October 5 | MIN | #11; Don Denkinger (crew chief) | #20; Dale Ford | #18; Greg Kosc | #19; Rich Garcia |

=== Postseason ===
1980 Postseason Umpire game log
AL Championship Series: vs. New York Yankees

| # | Date | Opponent | HP | 1B | 2B | 3B | LF | RF |
|---|---|---|---|---|---|---|---|---|
| 1 | October 8 | NYY | #14; Steve Palermo | #15; Joe Brinkman | #10; Larry McCoy | #1; Bill Haller (crew chief) | #21; Ken Kaiser | #28; George Maloney |
| 2 | October 9 | NYY | #15; Joe Brinkman | #10; Larry McCoy | #1; Bill Haller (crew chief) | #21; Ken Kaiser | #28; George Maloney | #14; Steve Palermo |
| 3 | October 10 | @ NYY | #10; Larry McCoy | #1; Bill Haller (crew chief) | #21; Ken Kaiser | #28; George Maloney | #14; Steve Palermo | #15; Joe Brinkman |

World Series: vs. Philadelphia Phillies

| # | Date | Opponent | HP | 1B | 2B | 3B | LF | RF |
|---|---|---|---|---|---|---|---|---|
| 1 | October 14 | @ PHI | #21; Harry Wendelstedt (NL) (crew chief) | #9; Bill Kunkel (AL) | #13; Paul Pryor (NL) | #11; Don Denkinger (AL) | #16; Dutch Rennert (NL) | #2; Nick Bremigan (AL) |
| 2 | October 15 | @ PHI | #9; Bill Kunkel (AL) | #13; Paul Pryor (NL) | #11; Don Denkinger (AL) | #16; Dutch Rennert (NL) | #2; Nick Bremigan (AL) | #21; Harry Wendelstedt (NL) (crew chief) |
| 3 | October 17 | PHI | #13; Paul Pryor (NL) | #11; Don Denkinger (AL) | #16; Dutch Rennert (NL) | #2; Nick Bremigan (AL) | #21; Harry Wendelstedt (NL) (crew chief) | #9; Bill Kunkel (AL) |
| 4 | October 18 | PHI | #11; Don Denkinger (AL) | #16; Dutch Rennert (NL) | #2; Nick Bremigan (AL) | #21; Harry Wendelstedt (NL) (crew chief) | #9; Bill Kunkel (AL) | #13; Paul Pryor (NL) |
| 5 | October 19 | PHI | #16; Dutch Rennert (NL) | #2; Nick Bremigan (AL) | #21; Harry Wendelstedt (NL) (crew chief) | #9; Bill Kunkel (AL) | #13; Paul Pryor (NL) | #11; Don Denkinger (AL) |
| 6 | October 21 | @ PHI | #2; Nick Bremigan (AL) | #21; Harry Wendelstedt (NL) (crew chief) | #9; Bill Kunkel (AL) | #13; Paul Pryor (NL) | #11; Don Denkinger (AL) | #16; Dutch Rennert (NL) |

== Player stats ==
| = Indicates team leader |

| = Indicates league leader |

=== Batting ===
==== Starters by position ====
Note: Pos = Position; G = Games played; AB = At bats; R = Runs; H = Hits; 2B = Doubles; 3B = Triples; Avg. = Batting average; HR = Home runs; RBI = Runs batted in; SB = Stolen bases

| Pos | Player | G | AB | R | H | 2B | 3B | Avg. | HR | RBI | SB |
|---|---|---|---|---|---|---|---|---|---|---|---|
| C | Darrell Porter | 118 | 418 | 51 | 104 | 14 | 2 | .249 | 7 | 51 | 1 |
| 1B | Willie Aikens | 151 | 543 | 70 | 151 | 24 | 0 | .278 | 20 | 98 | 1 |
| 2B | Frank White | 154 | 560 | 70 | 148 | 23 | 4 | .264 | 7 | 60 | 19 |
| 3B | George Brett | 117 | 449 | 87 | 175 | 33 | 9 | .390 | 24 | 118 | 15 |
| SS | U L Washington | 153 | 549 | 79 | 150 | 16 | 11 | .273 | 6 | 53 | 20 |
| LF | Willie Wilson | 161 | 705 | 133 | 230 | 28 | 15* | .326 | 3 | 49 | 79 |
| CF | Amos Otis | 107 | 394 | 56 | 99 | 16 | 3 | .251 | 10 | 53 | 16 |
| RF | Clint Hurdle | 130 | 395 | 50 | 116 | 31 | 2 | .294 | 10 | 60 | 0 |
| DH | Hal McRae | 124 | 489 | 73 | 145 | 39 | 5 | .297 | 14 | 83 | 10 |

- Tied with Alfredo Griffin (Toronto) for league lead

==== Other batters ====
Note: G = Games played; AB = At bats; R = Runs; H = Hits; Avg. = Batting average; HR = Home runs; RBI = Runs batted in; SB = Stolen bases

| Player | G | AB | R | H | Avg. | HR | RBI | SB |
|---|---|---|---|---|---|---|---|---|
| John Wathan | 126 | 453 | 57 | 138 | .305 | 6 | 58 | 17 |
| Dave Chalk | 69 | 167 | 19 | 42 | .251 | 1 | 20 | 1 |
| Jamie Quirk | 62 | 163 | 13 | 45 | .276 | 5 | 21 | 3 |
| Pete LaCock | 114 | 156 | 14 | 32 | .205 | 1 | 18 | 1 |
| Rusty Torres | 51 | 72 | 10 | 12 | .167 | 0 | 3 | 1 |
| Rance Mulliniks | 36 | 54 | 8 | 14 | .259 | 0 | 6 | 0 |
| José Cardenal | 25 | 53 | 8 | 18 | .340 | 0 | 5 | 0 |
| Bob Detherage | 20 | 26 | 2 | 8 | .308 | 1 | 7 | 1 |
| Steve Braun | 14 | 23 | 0 | 1 | .043 | 0 | 1 | 0 |
| Jerry Terrell | 22 | 16 | 4 | 1 | .063 | 0 | 0 | 0 |
| Onix Concepción | 12 | 15 | 1 | 2 | .133 | 0 | 2 | 0 |
| Manny Castillo | 7 | 10 | 1 | 2 | .200 | 0 | 0 | 0 |
| Ken Phelps | 3 | 4 | 0 | 0 | .000 | 0 | 0 | 0 |
| Germán Barranca | 7 | 0 | 3 | 0 | ---- | 0 | 0 | 0 |

=== Pitching ===
==== Starting pitchers ====
Note: G = Games pitched; IP = Innings pitched; W = Wins; L = Losses; ERA = Earned run average; BB = Walks allowed; SO = Strikeouts

| Player | G | IP | W | L | ERA | BB | SO |
|---|---|---|---|---|---|---|---|
| Larry Gura | 36 | 283.1 | 18 | 10 | 2.95 | 76 | 113 |
| Dennis Leonard | 38 | 280.1 | 20 | 11 | 3.79 | 80 | 155 |
| Paul Splittorff | 34 | 204.0 | 14 | 11 | 4.15 | 43 | 53 |
| Rich Gale | 32 | 190.2 | 13 | 9 | 3.92 | 78 | 97 |

==== Other pitchers ====
Note: G = Games pitched; IP = Innings pitched; W = Wins; L = Losses; SV = Saves; ERA = Earned run average; BB = Walks allowed; SO = Strikeouts

| Player | G | IP | W | L | SV | ERA | BB | SO |
|---|---|---|---|---|---|---|---|---|
| Renie Martin | 32 | 137.1 | 10 | 10 | 2 | 4.39 | 70 | 68 |
| Steve Busby | 11 | 42.1 | 1 | 3 | 0 | 6.17 | 19 | 12 |
| Mike Jones | 3 | 4.2 | 0 | 1 | 0 | 11.57 | 5 | 2 |

==== Relief pitchers ====
Note: G = Games pitched; IP = Innings pitched; W = Wins; L = Losses; SV = Saves; ERA = Earned run average; BB = Walks allowed; SO = Strikeouts

| Player | G | IP | W | L | SV | ERA | BB | SO |
|---|---|---|---|---|---|---|---|---|
| Dan Quisenberry | 75 | 128.1 | 12 | 7 | 33 | 3.09 | 27 | 37 |
| Marty Pattin | 37 | 89.0 | 4 | 0 | 4 | 3.64 | 23 | 40 |
| Gary Christenson | 24 | 31.1 | 3 | 0 | 1 | 5.17 | 18 | 16 |
| Jeff Twitty | 13 | 22.1 | 2 | 1 | 0 | 6.04 | 7 | 9 |
| Rawly Eastwick | 14 | 22.0 | 0 | 1 | 0 | 5.32 | 8 | 5 |
| Ken Brett | 8 | 13.1 | 0 | 0 | 1 | 0.00 | 5 | 4 |
| Craig Chamberlain | 5 | 9.1 | 0 | 1 | 0 | 6.75 | 5 | 3 |
| Jerry Terrell | 1 | 1.0 | 0 | 0 | 0 | 0.00 | 1 | 0 |

== Postseason ==
=== ALCS ===
==== Game 1 ====
October 8 Royals Stadium

| Team | 1 | 2 | 3 | 4 | 5 | 6 | 7 | 8 | 9 | R | H | E |
|---|---|---|---|---|---|---|---|---|---|---|---|---|
| New York | 0 | 2 | 0 | 0 | 0 | 0 | 0 | 0 | 0 | 2 | 10 | 1 |
| Kansas City | 0 | 2 | 2 | 0 | 0 | 0 | 1 | 2 | X | 7 | 10 | 0 |
W: Larry Gura (1–0) L: Ron Guidry (0–1)
HRs: NYY – Rick Cerone (1) Lou Piniella (1) KCR – George Brett (1)

==== Game 2 ====
October 9 Royals Stadium

| Team | 1 | 2 | 3 | 4 | 5 | 6 | 7 | 8 | 9 | R | H | E |
|---|---|---|---|---|---|---|---|---|---|---|---|---|
| New York | 0 | 0 | 0 | 0 | 2 | 0 | 0 | 0 | 0 | 2 | 8 | 0 |
| Kansas City | 0 | 0 | 3 | 0 | 0 | 0 | 0 | 0 | X | 3 | 6 | 0 |
W: Dennis Leonard (1–0) L: Rudy May (0–1) S: Dan Quisenberry (1)
HRs: NYY – Graig Nettles

==== Game 3 ====
October 10 Yankee Stadium

| Team | 1 | 2 | 3 | 4 | 5 | 6 | 7 | 8 | 9 | R | H | E |
|---|---|---|---|---|---|---|---|---|---|---|---|---|
| Kansas City | 0 | 0 | 0 | 0 | 1 | 0 | 3 | 0 | 0 | 4 | 12 | 1 |
| New York | 0 | 0 | 0 | 0 | 0 | 2 | 0 | 0 | 0 | 2 | 8 | 0 |
W: Dan Quisenberry (1–0) L: Rich Gossage (0–1)
HRs: KCR – George Brett (2) Frank White (1)

==== World Series ====
NL Philadelphia Phillies (4) vs. AL Kansas City Royals (2)
| Game | Score | Date | Location | Attendance | Time of Game |
|---|---|---|---|---|---|
| 1 | Royals – 6, Phillies – 7 | October 14 | Veterans Stadium (Philadelphia) | 65,791 | 3:01 |
| 2 | Royals – 4, Phillies – 6 | October 15 | Veterans Stadium (Philadelphia) | 65,775 | 3:01 |
| 3 | Phillies – 3, Royals – 4 (10 inns) | October 17 | Royals Stadium (Kansas City) | 42,380 | 3:19 |
| 4 | Phillies – 3, Royals – 5 | October 18 | Royals Stadium (Kansas City) | 42,363 | 2:37 |
| 5 | Phillies – 4, Royals – 3 | October 19 | Royals Stadium (Kansas City) | 42,369 | 2:51 |
| 6 | Royals – 1, Phillies – 4 | October 21 | Veterans Stadium (Philadelphia) | 65,838 | 3:00 |

== Awards and honors ==
- George Brett – American League Batting Champion (.390)
- George Brett, Hutch Award

== Farm system ==
| Level | Team | League | Manager |
|---|---|---|---|
| AAA | Omaha Royals | American Association | Joe Sparks |
| AA | Jacksonville Suns | Southern League | Gene Lamont |
| A | Fort Myers Royals | Florida State League | Brian Murphy |
| A | Charleston Royals | South Atlantic League | Ron Mihal |
| Rookie | GCL Royals Blue | Gulf Coast League | Joe Jones |
| Rookie | GCL Royals Gold | Gulf Coast League | Roy Tanner |

LEAGUE CHAMPIONS: GCL Royals Blue
