= 1979 Major League umpires strike =

Major League Umpires Association strike

The 1979 Major League Umpires Association Strike was a labor action by the Major League Umpires Association (MLUA) against Major League Baseball (MLB) that lasted from March until mid-May, 1979.

== Background ==
Entering the 1979 MLB season, the union as well as the umpires were unhappy with the arbiters' working conditions. The highest salary an umpire could make was just under $40,000 per year for over 170 games (compared to $60,000 for an NBA official working fewer than 100 games at the time), little to no in-season vacation time, and very little protection against management. "The umpires have kept this game honest for 100 years," Ron Luciano explained to a reporter, in 1978. "We're the only segment of the game that has never been touched by scandal. We gotta be too dumb to cheat. We must have integrity, because we sure don't have a normal family life. We certainly aren't properly paid. We have no health care, no job security, no tenure. Our pension plan is a joke. We take more abuse than any living group of humans, and can't give back any. If we're fired without notice, our only recourse is to appeal to the league president. And he's the guy that fires you. That's gotta be unconstitutional!"

== Strike action ==
Though the umpires were under contract through the 1981 season, most remained dissatisfied with its terms. As Luciano explained, "Baseball's big shots have been ignoring us for 18 months since we signed that contract. It was agreed that we could still discuss and negotiate matters that were not specifically covered in that contract. But they won't even talk to us. It's like we don't exist. They can dress us up in blue suits, but they don't want to be seen in public with us. Baseball is making us mad, and you know how umpires get when they're mad."

In lieu of a formal "strike" the umpires simply refused to sign their 1979 contracts at the salaries offered, per instruction of union head Richie Phillips. Only two umpires, Paul Pryor of the National League, a 16-year veteran, and Ted Hendry of the American League, a rookie umpire, signed their contracts before the union action occurred. Hendry was advised by Phillips to work, and they would both join the union in strike actions later. The leagues made arrangements to use retired and amateur umpires to work the final week of Spring Training, including bringing up eight minor league umpires, including Dave Pallone, Steve Fields, Fred Brocklander and Lanny Harris to the National League and Derryl Cousins, Dallas Parks, Fred Spenn, and John Shulock in the American League. Attempts to force the umpires to go back to work failed as the courts refused to force the umpires to return to work.

The season began on April 4, 1979; Pryor worked home plate for the traditional Opening Day game in Cincinnati between the Reds and the San Francisco Giants, while Hendry began his American League assignment the next day, accompanied by amateur and retired umpires. At both locations the striking umps picketed outside the stadiums, dressed in their official umpire uniforms. After Opening Day, Pryor had decided to return to the picket lines, but was asked to return by Phillips, who informed Pryor he had to give 10 days' notice to avoid paying hefty fines. Hendry did the same and both left MLB ten days later. The players and managers complained about the replacement umps missing calls, even admitting them in some cases, and the complaints seemed to grow each day. Players and managers alike were being ejected frequently and sportswriters began questioning the umpires' integrity.

== Settlement ==
On May 15, 1979, the MLUA and MLB settled the labor dispute; the terms allowed the umpires to have in-season vacations by utilizing an additional umpiring crew in each league, the institution of a 401(k) plan, increases in salaries, pensions, and per diems, and a return to merit-based assignments for post-season games (replacing the rotation system that began in 1975) starting in 1982. The settlement was hailed by both players and managers. The agreement was formally signed on May 18; as a result, replacement umpires worked the famous game on May 17 between the Philadelphia Phillies and the Chicago Cubs that was won by the Phillies, 23–22.

== Replacement umpires ==
Another of the settlement's conditions was that the eight umpires that were hired as "replacements" during the strike would be retained, provided they maintained satisfactory performance (though Phillips claimed they were given additional credit not available to the veterans and the NL replacements were granted an extra week of vacation, charges denied by both the NL and MLB). This resulted in animosity between the veteran umpires and the rookies that the strikers regarded as "scabs"; since they crossed picket lines, they were not allowed to join the MLUA. The replacements complained about unfair treatment by the veterans—not standing behind them on disputed calls, vandalizing their lockers, not including them in discussions both on and off the field, and generally shunning them. These conditions resulted in separate lawsuits by the MLUA (referencing the above claims about preferential treatment of the replacement umpires) and by the replacements for their treatment by the veterans. Gradually the replacements left MLB as follows:

- 1980 – Fred Spenn (AL)
- 1981 – Steve Fields (NL)
- 1982 – Dallas Parks (AL)
- 1985 – Lanny Harris (NL)
- 1988 – Dave Pallone (NL)
- 1992 – Fred Brocklander (NL)

Spenn (in 1980), Fields (in 1981) and Harris (in 1985) were fired, Parks (in 1982) and Pallone (in 1988) resigned, Brocklander retired for medical reasons in 1992.

Two replacement umpires remained in MLB after the 1999 labor dispute, which led to the decertification of the Major League Umpires Association in a move led by American League umpire John Hirschbeck, who led the new leadership group, the World Umpires Association, which the National Labor Relations Board approved on February 24, 2000. Both remaining replacement umpires were granted membership into the Hirschbeck-led organisation.

- 2002 – John Shulock (AL)
- 2012 – Derryl Cousins (AL)

Shulock retired in 2002, and Cousins, the last remaining replacement umpire still in MLB and the last umpire to have worn the AL's red blazer (used from 1973-79), retired in 2012.

== Aftermath ==
The strike made players, managers, and fans more aware of the umpires' working conditions and their fight for improvements gave the arbiters more respect and games ran more smoothly after the regular umpires returned. The labor problems did not disappear, however, as the umps staged another walkout during the 1984 American League Championship Series that resulted in replacement umps working the entire series (with retired AL umpire Bill Deegan calling balls and strikes for all three games wearing the balloon protector—the last time an AL umpire did so in LCS play), and the 1984 National League Championship Series, which was worked by replacements until Game 5, when an agreement was reached. Other labor actions between the umpires and owners occurred in 1991, 1995, and culminated in the 1999 Major League Umpires Association mass resignation.
