= Gary Christenson =

Gary Christenson may refer to:

- Gary Christenson (mayor), mayor of Malden, Massachusetts
- Gary Christenson (baseball) (born 1953), Major League Baseball pitcher
