= Jim McKean =

Canadian baseball umpire (1945-2019)

- Born: May 26, 1945; Montreal, Quebec, Canada
- Died: January 24, 2019 (aged 73); St. Petersburg, Florida, U.S.
- Occupation: MLB umpire
- Baseball career

Member of the Canadian

Baseball Hall of Fame
- Induction: 2004

James Gilbert McKean (May 26, 1945 – January 24, 2019) was a Canadian umpire in Major League Baseball (MLB) who worked in the American League (AL) from 1974 to 1999, and in both major leagues in 2000 and 2001. He umpired in the World Series in 1979, 1985 and 1995. He also officiated in five American League Championship Series (1977, 1983, 1987, 1991, 1998) and three All-Star games (1980, 1982, 1993), calling balls and strikes for the last game, as well as the 1981, 1995 and 1999 American League Division Series. He wore uniform number 8 after the AL adopted uniform numbers in 1980.

After his retirement from active umpiring, McKean entered television as an umpiring consultant for ESPN.

== Early career ==
After a high school football career as a star quarterback, McKean received athletic scholarship offers to 35 U.S. schools. Instead, he played junior football with the NDG Maple Leafs and then professionally with the Montreal Alouettes and the Saskatchewan Roughriders of the Canadian Football League. Though McKean wanted to make it as a quarterback, he was forced into the punter role when he was traded to Saskatchewan in 1967; the Roughriders were quarterbacked by CFL standout Ron Lancaster. That was McKean's last year in the CFL.

McKean had attended NHL referee school and worked as a college hockey referee during the football offseasons. McKean attended baseball umpire school in 1970, then worked in the minor leagues before joining the American League. His minor league service included work in the Florida State League, the Florida Instructional League, the Eastern League, the Puerto Rico Winter League and the International League.

== MLB umpiring career ==
=== On the field ===
McKean made it to the major leagues as an umpire in 1974. By 1976, AL umpire supervisor Dick Butler said, "I'll go out on a limb and say that, in my opinion, McKean is the best of our 24 umpires. He has the perfect temperament. He can listen, he can dish it out, he can be serious and he can be humorous. He's 6-foot-2, 225 pounds, no fat and he has the kind of presence that commands respect."

He was the third base umpire for Len Barker's perfect game on May 15, 1981. In 1993, he umpired in his tenth no-hitter, tying a record shared by Silk O'Loughlin and Paul Pryor. Also that year, on May 22, he was involved in a rare incident where he ejected Toronto Blue Jays mascot BJ Birdy for trying to influence one of his calls. On April 7, 1997, McKean was the crew chief for a Rangers-Brewers game at Milwaukee when play was halted three times by fans who threw baseballs onto the field; McKean and Milwaukee manager Phil Garner both used microphones to admonish fans to behave. He was also the home plate umpire for the first interleague game in Major League Baseball history between the San Francisco Giants and Texas Rangers on June 12, 1997.

=== Later career ===
McKean served as an MLB umpire supervisor from 2002 until he was fired (along with fellow supervisors Rich Garcia and Marty Springstead) in January 2010. MLB did not cite specific reasons for the firings, but Springstead said the actions were related to a series of missed calls by the umpires who worked the 2009 baseball postseason. Rob Manfred, executive vice president for MLB, said, "The change in supervisors is part of our ongoing effort to make our organization as strong as possible."

By 2011, McKean was working as an umpiring consultant to ESPN.

== Personal life ==
McKean's wife Ann, a breast cancer survivor, died three weeks after a diagnosis of liver cancer in 2007.

McKean's sons Jamie and Brett each won a Division II College World Series while playing for the University of Tampa. Jamie went on to attend law school.

McKean graduated from Monklands High School in Montreal, Quebec.

He was inducted into the Canadian Baseball Hall of Fame in the Class of 2004.

McKean died on January 23, 2019, at age 73.

== See also ==
- List of Major League Baseball umpires (disambiguation)
