= Dallas Parks =

American former baseball umpire (born 1942)

- Born: April 8, 1942 (age 82); Salisbury, Maryland, U.S.
- Occupation: Former MLB umpire

Dallas Finney Parks (born April 8, 1942) is an American former baseball umpire. Parks was one of the eight minor league replacement umpires who was promoted to the major leagues during the 1979 Major League Umpires Strike, and worked from 1979 until 1982. Parks wore number 30 when the American League adopted uniform numbers for its umpires in 1980.

== Minor league career ==
Parks turned to umpiring after his career as a player was ended by a torn Achilles tendon he suffered during a pick-up basketball game in college. After attending the Bill Kinnamon umpiring school in Florida (in the same class as future American League umpires Durwood Merrill and Steve Palermo and future National League umpire Ed Montague), Parks started his career in the Florida State League in 1972, then was assigned to the Carolina League the next season but resigned. He returned to the Southern League in 1974 before being promoted to the International League in 1975, where he remained for nearly four years and became one of the top-rated AAA umpires. In 1979, he (along with Fred Spenn, Derryl Cousins and John Shulock) were brought up to the American League as replacement umpires during the strike that season.

== Major league baseball ==
Parks worked as an American League umpire until 1982, when Parks resigned (becoming the third replacement umpire to leave the game; Fred Spenn was fired in 1980 and National League umpire Steve Fields was fired in 1981) rather than continue to be subject to the harsh treatment accorded him and the other replacements (referred to as "scabs" by the regular umpires because of crossing the picket lines) and a scathing rebuke of his abilities by New York Yankees owner George Steinbrenner after a series in August 1982 against the Toronto Blue Jays when Parks ejected Oscar Gamble and Roy Smalley on consecutive days. Steinbrenner said of Parks: "Judging from his last two days performance, my people tell me he is not a capable umpire. For umpire Parks to throw two of our players out of ballgames in two days on plays he misjudges is ludicrous". Steinbrenner went on to refer to Parks as a "scab" and that he "had it in" for the Yankees since he used that term towards the umpire. Parks filed a defamation of character lawsuit against Steinbrenner and the Yankees, Parks won in a lower court but the New York Supreme Court overruled the lower court in 1987, indicating that the First Amendment gave Steinbrenner the right to "razz the umpire", as have generations of fans before and since. He returned to work games during the umpire labor actions in 1991 and 1995 in addition to running two different minor league teams in North Carolina.

== See also ==
- List of Major League Baseball umpires (disambiguation)
