= Twitty =

Twitty is a surname. Notable people with the name include:

- Beth Holloway-Twitty (born c. 1961), American speech pathologist and motivational speaker
- Conway Twitty (1933–1993), American country music singer
- Howard Twitty (born 1949), American professional golfer
- James Twitty (c. 1916–1994), American painter
- Jasmine Twitty (born 1989), African-American associate municipal court judge
- Jeff Twitty (born 1957), American baseball player
- Michael W. Twitty (born 1977), African-American Jewish writer, culinary historian, and educator
- Panthea Twitty (1912–1977), American photographer, ceramist, and historian
- Pat Twitty, American songwriter who wrote an enduring jingle for Martha White flour in 1953
- Sallie Duke Drake Twitty (1835–1923), American schoolteacher and principal
- Stephen Twitty (born 1963), United States Army Lieutenant General
- Victor C. Twitty (1901–1967), American biologist

== Fictional characters ==
- Alan Twitty, a character in Even Stevens, an American TV series
- Eleanor Twitty, a character in the Ghostbusters universe

== See also ==
- Tweedy (disambiguation)
- Tweety (disambiguation)
