= Tweeter (disambiguation) =

A tweeter is a loudspeaker designed to produce high frequencies.

Tweeter may also refer to:

- Tweeter, an active user of the website X (formerly Twitter)
- Tweeter (store), a defunct electronics retail chain in the United States
- Tweeter Center (disambiguation), the former name of several buildings

== See also ==
- "Tweeter and the Monkey Man", a song by the Traveling Wilburys
- Super tweeter
- Soft dome tweeter
- Tweet (disambiguation)
