= Steve Fields =

American baseball umpire (1941-2009)

- Born: Stephen Harold Fields; January 1, 1941; Alexandria, Virginia, U.S.
- Died: October 29, 2009 (aged 68); Alexandria, Virginia, U.S.
- Occupation: Umpire
- Years active: 1979-1981
- Employer: National League

Stephen Harold Fields (January 1, 1941 – October 29, 2009) was an American Major League Baseball umpire who worked in the National League from 1979 to 1981, wearing uniform number 27 during his career. Fields umpired 373 Major League games.

== Umpiring career ==
Fields worked 11 seasons in the minor leagues and was brought up to the National League (along with Dave Pallone, Lanny Harris, and Fred Brocklander) during the 1979 Major League Baseball umpires strike as a replacement. As such, he was not permitted to join the Major League Umpires Association.

In the 1979 season, he umpired first base during Ken Forsch's no-hitter against the Atlanta Braves.

When the strike was settled, Fields and the others were allowed to remain on the staff as long as their performance was satisfactory. On November 15, 1981, after the 1981 season, Fields was fired for "low performance ratings" and "failure to show improvement", the first of the four replacements to leave (Harris was fired in 1985, Pallone technically resigned in 1988, and Brocklander retired in 1992).

Throughout his time in the major leagues, Fields faced ostracism from the union umpires. Fields filed a $1 million lawsuit against MLB because of his firing and claiming that his performance suffered due to the "ostracism and antagonism" from other umpires due to his "scab" status. The lawsuit was eventually dropped due to a lack of reliable evidence.

== Personal life ==
Fields worked railroad and postal jobs as well as working as an oil driver in Alexandria, Virginia. At the same time he was also working on the side as a high school umpire, before pursuing officiating as a professional.

After his firing and lawsuit failure, Fields struggled to get another job. He worked at the U.S. Postal Service, and as a high school umpire and as a truck driver.

Fields died on October 29, 2009, at the age of 68.
