= Renie Martin =

American baseball player (born 1955)

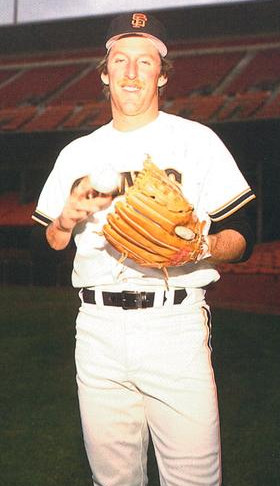
- Pitcher
- Born: August 30, 1955 (age 70); Dover, Delaware, U.S.
- Batted: Right Threw: Right

MLB debut
- May 9, 1979, for the Kansas City Royals

Last MLB appearance
- September 30, 1984, for the Philadelphia Phillies

MLB statistics
- Win–loss record: 24–35
- Earned run average: 4.27
- Strikeouts: 237
- Stats at Baseball Reference

Teams
- Kansas City Royals (1979–1981); San Francisco Giants (1982–1984); Philadelphia Phillies (1984)

Donald Renie Martin (born August 30, 1955) is an American former Major League Baseball pitcher.

== Early career ==
Born in Dover, Delaware, Martin played for Dover High School and later attended the University of Richmond. Martin was drafted twice, by the San Francisco Giants in 1976 and by the Kansas City Royals in 1977 to play for the Gulf Coast Royals farm team in Sarasota, Florida. He later played for the Daytona Beach Islanders, Jacksonville Suns, Fort Myers Royals, Omaha Royals, and in Phoenix Suns.

== Major League career ==
He was called to the majors in 1979 and appeared in 25 games in relief in his rookie year. He finished the year with an ERA of 5.19 with five saves. The next year, the Royals gave him a chance to start. He started twenty games, going 10-10 with a 4.39 ERA. He did have two saves that year, also. In 1981, he had arguably his best year, pitching exclusively in relief, but achieving a 2.77 ERA in 29 games. However, the Royals traded him to the San Francisco Giants with Craig Chamberlain, Atlee Hammaker, and Brad Wellman for Vida Blue and Bob Tufts.

Martin spent most of his first year with the Giants as primarily a starter (7-10, 4.65 ERA). They moved him to the bullpen the next year, and he spent most of the next two years as a relief pitcher before the Giants traded him to the Philadelphia Phillies at the end of August 1984 with Al Oliver for Kelly Downs and George Riley. He continued his role as a reliever with the Phillies until they released him after the 1984 season. The Royals re-signed him in 1985, but he never pitched in the Majors again.

Martin did have some postseason experience. He appeared in three games in the 1980 World Series for the Royals, appearing in three games, recording 9 2/3 IP, allowing three earned runs. He also appeared in the special Division Series after the strike-shortened 1981 season for the Royals. In that series, he threw 5 1/3 innings allowing only one hit.

== Senior baseball ==
Martin was a member of the Florida Tropics in the Senior Professional Baseball Association in 1990. He finished the season 1-2 with an ERA of 4.44.

== Awards and honors ==
In 1995, the Delaware Sports Hall of Fame inducted Martin.
