= Tweety (disambiguation) =

Tweety is a fictional canary in Looney Tunes and Merrie Melodies.

Tweety may also refer to:

- Tweety Carter (born 1986), American basketball player
- Tweety González (born 1963), Argentine musician
- Tweety Walters (born 1976), Jamaican soccer player

== See also ==
- Tweetie Pie, a 1947 Academy Award-winning animated short
- Tweetie, a client for the social networking website Twitter
- Tweet (disambiguation)
- Twitty (disambiguation)
- Tweedy (disambiguation)
