= Jerry Neudecker =

American baseball umpire (1930-1997)

- Born: Jerome August Neudecker; August 13, 1930; Marine, Illinois, U.S.
- Died: January 11, 1997 (aged 66); Fort Walton Beach, Florida, U.S.
- Occupation: Umpire
- Years active: 1966–1985
- Employer: American League

Jerome August Neudecker (August 13, 1930 – January 11, 1997) was an American Major League Baseball umpire who worked in the American League from 1966 to 1985. He wore number 6 when the league adopted uniform numbers in 1980.

== Early career ==
Born in Marine, Illinois, Neudecker attended Johnson's Umpire School, run by former NL umpire Steamboat Johnson. After attending the umpire school, Neudecker began working in the Georgia–Florida League in 1950. In 1951, he moved to the Evangeline Baseball League. While serving in the Air Force, stationed in Valdosta, Georgia, Neudecker returned to the Georgia-Florida league in 1954 and 1955. In 1956, he began work in the South Atlantic League, before returning to the Air Force and serving until 1960.

Neudecker resumed working in the South Atlantic League in 1960 and continued on through 1962. The league's name was then changed to the Southern League, and Neudecker continued umpiring there through 1965, before being called up to the American League at the end of the 1965 season.

== Major league career ==
Neudecker worked in three All-Star Games (1966, 1972 and 1976) four American League Championship Series (1970, 1974, 1977 and 1981) and two World Series (1973 and 1979). He was the home plate umpire in Game 7 of the 1979 Series, which the Pittsburgh Pirates won after Willie Stargell's sixth-inning home run gave them a 2–1 lead and propelled them to a third straight victory over the Baltimore Orioles, who had led the Series three games to one. Neudecker also officiated in four no-hitters, including being the home plate umpire for two: Joe Horlen's on September 10, 1967 and Catfish Hunter's perfect game on May 8, 1968.

Neudecker was the last full-time Major League umpire to use a "balloon" chest protector. (Bill Deegan, who had retired during the 1980 season, wore this chest protector during two umpire strikes: on Opening Day, 1991, and for two games during the 1995 season.) After his retirement, his chest protector was sent to the Baseball Hall of Fame.

Neudecker's final game behind the plate was October 5, 1985, when the Toronto Blue Jays clinched their first American League East division championship by defeating the New York Yankees at Exhibition Stadium. The next day, in his final game, Neudecker worked at third base as Phil Niekro pitched a complete-game shutout for the Yankees to notch his 300th career win.

Neudecker then became the assistant supervisor of American League umpires in 1986, working under Marty Springstead.

Neudecker also owned and operated Pro Sports, a sporting goods store with his wife, Lujane Neudecker

At the time of his death, he was working in the Baseball Umpire Development program.

Neudecker died of cancer at age 66 at Fort Walton Beach, Florida, and was buried there at Beal Memorial Cemetery.

Jim Joyce wore No. 6 in the American League following Neudecker's retirement through 1999, the last year the American and National Leagues retained separate umpiring staffs. Bruce Froemming, who had worn No. 6 in the National League since 1979, was awarded the number when umpires were unified into a single MLB roster in 2000 and wore it through his retirement in 2007. As of 2025, Mark Carlson wears No. 6.

== See also ==
- List of Major League Baseball umpires (disambiguation)
