= Tweet =

Tweet often refers to:

- Tweet (bird call), a type of bird vocalization
- Tweet (social media), a post on the social media platform X (formerly Twitter)

Tweet may also refer to:

== People ==
- Tweet (singer) (born 1971), American R&B and soul singer-songwriter
- Jonathan Tweet, game designer

== Other uses ==
- Samuel Tweet, a character of the British actor and comedian Freddie Davies (born 1937)
- The Tweets, artists' name under which "The Birdie Song" charted in the UK in 1981
- Cessna T-37 Tweet, a twin-engine United States trainer-attack type aircraft

== See also ==
- Tweed (disambiguation)
- Tweeter (disambiguation)
- Tweety (disambiguation)
- TweetDeck, a social media dashboard application for management of Twitter accounts
