= Dan Morrison (umpire) =

American baseball umpire (1948–2023)

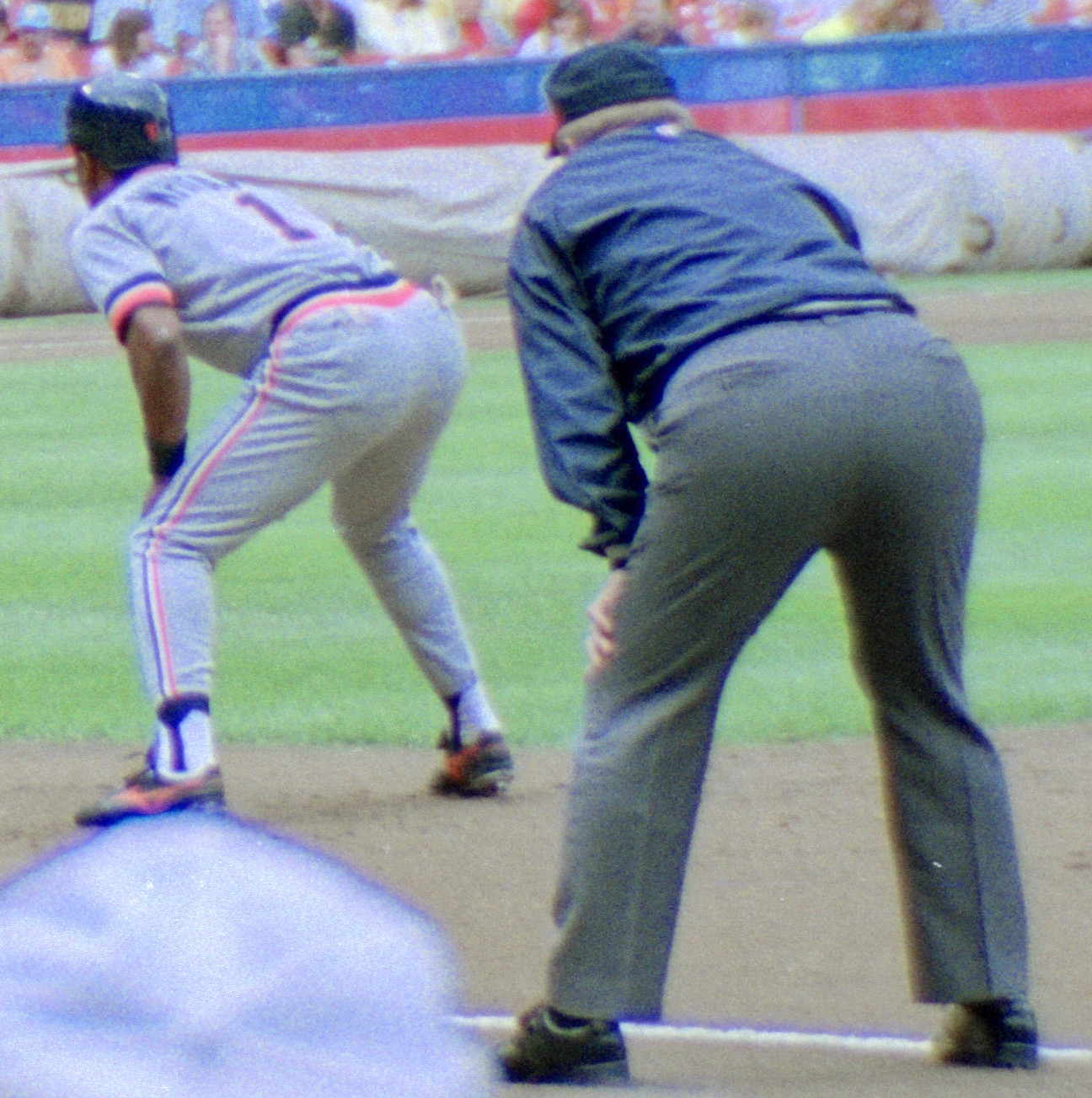
- Morrison umpiring first base during a 1991 game at Cleveland Stadium
- Born: Daniel Guthrie Morrison; January 21, 1948; Glasgow, Kentucky, U.S.
- Died: July 24, 2023 (aged 75); Florida, U.S.
- Occupation: Umpire
- Years active: 1979–1999 (AL), 2000–2001 (MLB)
- Employer(s): American League, Major League Baseball

Daniel Guthrie Morrison (January 21, 1948 – July 24, 2023) was an American professional baseball umpire who worked in the American League from 1979 to 1999, and throughout both major leagues in 2000 and 2001. He wore uniform number 34 when the AL adopted them for its umpires in 1980 and retained the number when the AL and NL umpiring staffs merged in 2000. Morrison umpired 2,660 major league games in his 23-year career. Morrison umpired in the 1992 World Series, the 1988 Major League Baseball All-Star Game, three American League Championship Series (1989, 1996 and 1999), and three Division Series (1995, 1997, and 2000).

== Career ==
After attending Western Kentucky University in his hometown of Bowling Green, Kentucky, Morrison went to umpiring school and became a minor league umpire in 1974. In 1979, during the major league umpire strike, he turned down an offer for a major league position. This earned Morrison respect among major league umpires. Later that season, he ended up in the major leagues anyway; Lou DiMuro was injured and Morrison was called up as his replacement. Morrison continued to serve as a substitute the next three seasons before he was hired full-time in 1983 after DiMuro's death in June 1982 and the retirement of legendary umpire Bill Haller following the 1982 World Series.

Morrison did not join the Major League Umpires Association's failed mass resignation in July 1999, following the lead of fellow AL umpires John Hirschbeck and Joe Brinkman.

== Death ==
Morrison died on July 24, 2023, at the age of 75.

== See also ==
- List of Major League Baseball umpires (disambiguation)
