= Nick Bremigan =

American baseball umpire (1945-1989)

- Born: April 4, 1945; Philadelphia, Pennsylvania, U.S.
- Died: March 28, 1989 (aged 43); Garland, Texas, U.S.
- Occupation: MLB umpire
- Years active: 1974–1989

Nicholas Gregory Bremigan (April 4, 1945 – March 28, 1989) was an American umpire in Major League Baseball who worked in the American League from 1974 until his death.

== Biography ==
Born in Philadelphia, Pennsylvania, Bremigan grew up in Rochester, New York, and graduated from Irondequoit High School. In 1965, he received a bachelor's degree in education from the University of Buffalo, and became a teacher at Monroe High School in Rochester. He later gave up teaching and undertook a career in umpiring, with stints in the Florida State League (1969–1970), Eastern League (1971), and International League (1972–1973).

Bremigan began umpiring in the American League (AL) in 1974, and umpired 2122 regular season AL games during his career. He also officiated in the 1980 World Series, and in the American League Championship Series in 1977, 1981, 1983, and 1986. He also worked the All-Star games of 1979 and 1985.

Bremigan was one of the umpires during the famous Pine Tar Incident with George Brett in 1983. In 1986, Bremigan became the first umpire to eject a manager from an American League Championship Series game, when he ejected Gene Mauch of the California Angels from Game 3 against the Boston Red Sox.

Bremigan died of a heart attack at age 43 in Garland, Texas. He had umpired an exhibition game the day before his death.

AL umpires wore Bremigan's number 2 on their sleeves in his memory throughout the 1989 season. No AL umpire wore the number again through 1999. Umpire Jerry Crawford wore number 2 in the National League, and kept it when the umpires from both leagues merged into one staff in 2000.

== See also ==
- List of Major League Baseball umpires (disambiguation)
