= Jeff Twitty =

American baseball player (born 1957)

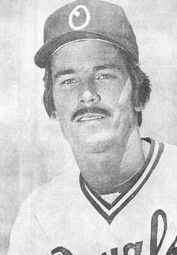
- Twitty in 1980
- Pitcher
- Born: November 10, 1957 (age 68); Lancaster, South Carolina, U.S.
- Batted: Left Threw: Left

MLB debut
- July 5, 1980, for the Kansas City Royals

Last MLB appearance
- September 23, 1980, for the Kansas City Royals

MLB statistics
- Win–loss record: 2–1
- Earned run average: 6.04
- Strikeouts: 9
- Stats at Baseball Reference

Teams
- Kansas City Royals (1980)

Jeffrey Dean Twitty (born November 10, 1957) is an American former Major League Baseball pitcher who played for one season. He pitched for the Kansas City Royals for 13 games during the 1980 season.

Twitty attended Anderson College and the University of South Carolina. At South Carolina, he set a single-season school record with 10 saves. In 1978, he played collegiate summer baseball with the Hyannis Mets of the Cape Cod Baseball League, was named a league all-star, and helped Hyannis win the league title. He was selected by the Royals in the 25th round of the 1979 MLB draft.
