= Dave Pallone =

American baseball umpire (born 1951)

- Born: October 5, 1951 (age 74); Waltham, Massachusetts, U.S.
- Occupation: MLB umpire
- Years active: 1979–1988
- Height: 6 ft 3 in (1.91 m)
- Website: davepallone.com

David Michael Pallone (born October 5, 1951) is an American former Major League Baseball umpire who worked in the National League from 1979 to 1988. During Pallone's career, he wore uniform number 26.

== Umpiring career ==
Pallone umpired his first game at the age of 19 in the New York–Penn League in May 1971. He remained in the league for the 1972 season before being promoted to the Carolina League for the 1973 season. He spent half a season there before again being promoted on June 27 to the Eastern League. He umpired in the EL through the 1975 season, when he was brought up to the International League. Pallone spent the 1976 season in both the International and Eastern Leagues before being called up for good to the IL in 1977. He stayed in the league until 1979, when he was one of eight umpires hired during that year's strike by major league umpires.

Pallone remained in the NL for ten years, and umpired in the 1983 Major League Baseball All-Star Game and the 1987 National League Championship Series. He was the home plate umpire when Pete Rose tied Ty Cobb for the most hits (4,191); Nolan Ryan's 4,000th strikeout on July 11, 1985, and on September 25, 1986, he was the second base umpire when Mike Scott of the Houston Astros pitched a 2–0 no-hitter against the San Francisco Giants to clinch the NL West Division championship.

Pallone was overheard saying in an umpire's meeting that he deliberately stood in front of Reds shortstop Dave Concepción to interfere with his fielding. The comment brought surprised stares from those surrounding him and Pallone made no attempt to hide his disdain for the Cincinnati Reds. In his book, however, Pallone said that Concepcion once spit in Pallone's face. Concepcion complained about Pallone's positioning, but when Pete Rose, Pallone said, asked Pallone to move, he did so.

On April 30, 1988, Pallone was involved in a highly controversial confrontation with Rose when he managed the Cincinnati Reds. Pallone was umpiring at first base when he called New York Mets outfielder Mookie Wilson safe on a delayed call in the ninth inning, with the delay giving Howard Johnson the time to score the eventual game-winning run. Rose immediately rushed to Pallone to argue both the call and how slowly it was made. With both tempers boiling over, Pallone was mocking Rose's gestures by pointing his finger at Rose, which led Rose to accuse Pallone of poking him in the face. Rose then shoved Pallone, causing Rose's immediate ejection. Pallone denied touching Rose and Major League Baseball never determined that he did in fact touch Rose. The incident led to fans throwing garbage on the field, temporarily stopping the game and causing Pallone to be taken out of the game to ease tensions. The incident also resulted in Rose being suspended for 30 days with substantial undisclosed fine.

In September of that year, Pallone was forced to resign. He was "outed" later in the year in a New York Post article and alleged to have been involved in a sex ring that involved teenage boys. The New York district attorney later determined that Pallone was not involved; Pallone sued Major League baseball for wrongfully terminating him, and he later received a substantial settlement. But the damage had been done. Pallone later wrote his autobiography, Behind the Mask: My Double Life in Baseball, which became a New York Times best-seller, and has been republished as an e-book. Pallone now does diversity training for corporations, colleges, universities and athletes with the NCAA. Pallone was part of the first class of inductees to the National Gay and Lesbian Sports Hall of Fame in 2013.

== See also ==
- List of LGBT sportspeople
- List of Major League Baseball umpires (disambiguation)
