= Vic Voltaggio =

American baseball umpire (born 1941)

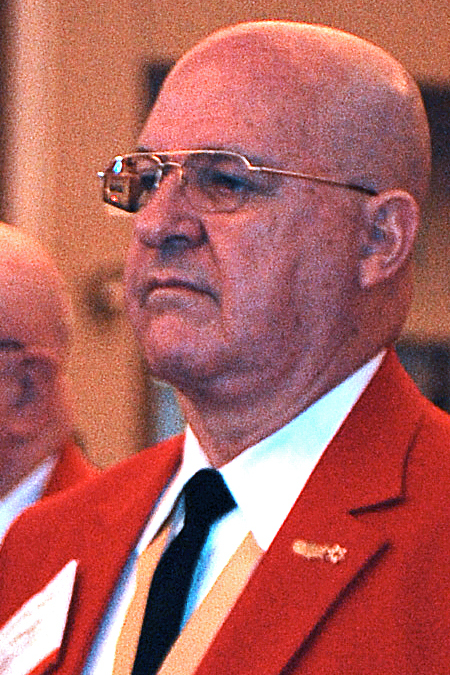
- Voltaggio in 2011
- Born: Vito Henry Voltaggio; March 17, 1941 (age 84); Vineland, New Jersey, U.S.
- Occupation: Umpire
- Years active: 1977-1996
- Employer(s): American League, Major League Baseball

Vito Henry "Vic" Voltaggio (born March 17, 1941) is an American former professional baseball umpire who worked in the American League from 1977 to 1996. Voltaggio umpired 2,118 major league games in his 20-year career. He umpired in a World Series, an All-Star Game, and three American League Championship Series. He was one of the last umpires to join the American League using the outside chest protector, which he used in 1977 and 1978. He wore uniform number 26 when the league adopted uniform numbers in 1980.

== Notable games ==
He umpired in the 1989 World Series, the 1987 Major League Baseball All-Star Game, and the American League Championship Series in 1981, 1985 and 1990.

Voltaggio was the home plate umpire for the 20-strikeout performance of Roger Clemens against the Seattle Mariners on April 29, 1986. He was also behind the plate when the 1989 World Series, known as the Bay Bridge Series, was struck by an earthquake at Candlestick Park in San Francisco. Voltaggio also called balls and strikes for Chris Bosio's no-hitter on April 22, 1993.

== Personal life ==
Voltaggio is a graduate of Vineland High School and East Carolina University.

He served in the United States Marine Corps and was deployed to Okinawa, the Philippines and Vietnam in the 1950s and 1960s.

== See also ==
- List of Major League Baseball umpires (disambiguation)
