= Larry McCoy (umpire) =

American baseball umpire (born 1941)

- Umpire
- Born: May 19, 1941 (age 84); Essex, Missouri, US

MLB debut
- September 25, 1970

Last MLB appearance
- August 29, 1999

Career highlights and awards
- Special assignments: World Series (1977, 1988); League Championship Series (1973, 1976, 1980, 1986, 1990, 1997); League Division Series (1981, 1995, 1998); All-Star Games (1978, 1985, 1996)

Larry Sanders McCoy (born May 19, 1941 in Essex, Missouri) is an American former umpire in Major League Baseball who worked in the American League from 1970 to 1999.

McCoy worked in the World Series in 1977 and 1988. He also umpired in six American League Championship Series (1973, 1976, 1980, 1986, 1990 and 1997) and three All-Star games (1978, 1985 and 1996), calling balls and strikes for the 1985 game. McCoy worked in the American League Division Series in 1981, 1995 and 1998. He was the third base umpire on April 20, 1986, when Roger Clemens became the first pitcher to strike out 20 batters in a nine-inning game. McCoy was also the first base umpire for David Cone's perfect game on July 18, 1999. He was the plate umpire for the Ten Cent Beer Night held by the Cleveland Indians on June 4, 1974, that ended in a forfeit win for the Texas Rangers. He was also the home plate umpire in Phil Niekro's 300th career win in Toronto on October 6, 1985.

McCoy wore uniform number 10 when the American League adopted uniform numbers in 1980. He was the first American League umpire to work home plate in the World Series wearing an inside chest protector, doing so during Game 3 of the 1977 World Series. Through 1974, all AL umpires were required to use the outside chest protector, while the NL had adopted the inside chest protector for decades under the leadership of Hall of Fame umpire Bill Klem. Starting in 1977, new AL umpires had to use the inside protector; umpires already on staff were grandfathered and could continue to use the outside protector. McCoy began using the inside protector in 1977.

== See also ==
- List of Major League Baseball umpires (disambiguation)
