= Durwood Merrill =

American baseball umpire (1938-2003)

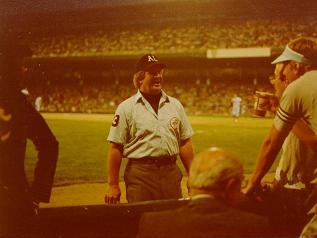
Merrill at Comiskey Park in 1980

Edwin Durwood Merrill (March 12, 1938 – January 11, 2003) was an American umpire in Major League Baseball (MLB) who worked in the American League for 23 seasons (1977–1999).

Merrill was born in Cloud Chief, Oklahoma. In 1998 he wrote a collection of his experiences called You're Out and You're Ugly, Too!.

== Career ==
Merrill served as football coach and athletic director at Hooks High School in Hooks, Texas in the 1960s. In 1970, he coached the minor-league Texarkana Titans of the Texas Football League, leading them to a 7-3 record and a playoff appearance. The following year, the Titans played in the re-branded Trans-America Football League, but he coached only one game before quitting. In 1972, Merrill decided to try a new sport: baseball. He attended the Bill Kinnamon umpiring school; among his classmates that year were future MLB umpires Ed Montague, Dallas Parks and Steve Palermo. He graduated third in his class and was immediately assigned to the Class-A California League for the 1972 season. He quickly worked his way through the minors, officiating in the Double-A Texas League in 1973 and the Triple-A American Association in 1974, 1975 and 1976, when he also was a fill-in in the American League.

Merrill umpired in the 1988 World Series, as well as American League Championship Series in 1981, 1983, 1987, 1992 and 1997. Merrill was behind the plate in Game 2 of the 1983 ALCS when Mike Boddicker tied an LCS record with 14 strikeouts, and Game 2 of the 1988 World Series, when Orel Hershiser of the Los Angeles Dodgers fired a three-hit, 6–0 shutout vs. the Oakland Athletics, led by "Bash Brothers" Jose Canseco and Mark McGwire.

He also officiated in the 1984 and 1995 All-Star Games, calling balls and strikes in the latter, and in the Division Series in 1996, 1998 and 1999. Merrill also called balls and strikes for Jack Morris' no-hitter on April 7, 1984, and was the first base umpire for Nolan Ryan's sixth no-hitter on June 11, 1990.

In Game 4 of the 1997 American League Championship Series, on a wild pitch with runners dashing around the bases, when Merrill gestured to where the ball was, Fox color commentator Tim McCarver sarcastically commented that "maybe he was trying to tell himself where the ball is!" Merrill heard about that, took offense to it, and fired back in his autobiography that he was letting the other umpires know that the situation was under control.

Merrill wore number 33 starting in 1980 when the AL adopted uniform numbers. He came into the AL in 1977, the year that the league made all new umpires on staff wear the inside chest protector, which had been standard in the NL for over 60 years. Merrill had one of the largest strike zones in baseball, and was easily recognizable when calling balls and strikes, as he crouched directly behind the catcher, the standard position for those using the balloon protector outlawed for new umpires in 1977, and often extended his arms far in front of him. Umpires using the inside protector typically work in the "slot", which is to the inside shoulder of the catcher (the left shoulder for a right-handed batter and the right shoulder for a left-handed batter).

== Memorabilia collection ==
Merrill amassed a large memorabilia collection consisting of signed baseballs, game used jerseys and bats from MLB players. He displayed his collection over the years for the benefit of his charitable efforts of various causes. The collection not only consisted of items he obtained, but he was also entrusted with many items from former umpire Shag Crawford.

== Death ==
Merrill suffered a heart attack in early January 2003, and died a few days later in Texarkana, Texas, at age 64. His family sued several doctors, nurses and Christus St. Michael Health Care Center after his death, alleging medical malpractice.

== See also ==
- List of Major League Baseball umpires (disambiguation)
