= Mike Jones (1980s pitcher) =

American baseball player (born 1959)

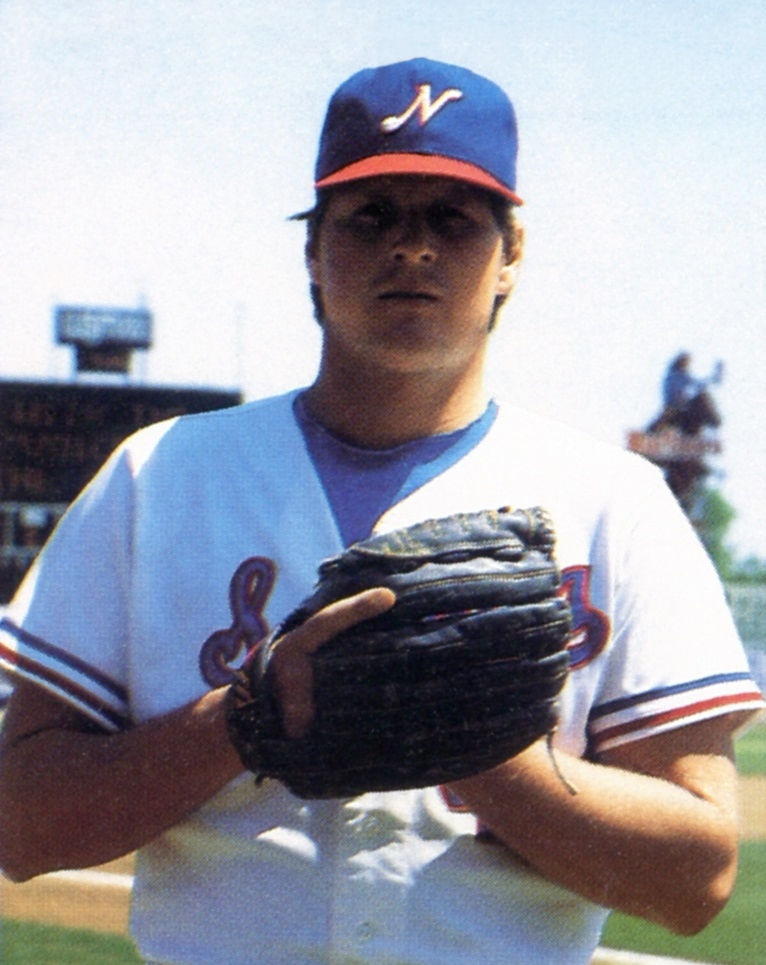
- Jones with the Nashville Sounds in 1988
- Pitcher
- Born: July 30, 1959 (age 66); Rochester, New York, U.S.
- Batted: Left Threw: Left

MLB debut
- September 6, 1980, for the Kansas City Royals

Last MLB appearance
- October 6, 1985, for the Kansas City Royals

MLB statistics
- Win–loss record: 3–5
- Earned run average: 4.29
- Strikeouts: 63
- Stats at Baseball Reference

Teams
- Kansas City Royals (1980–1981, 1984–1985)

Michael Carl Jones (born July 30, 1959) is an American former Major League Baseball pitcher. He played during four seasons at the major league level for the Kansas City Royals. He was signed by the Royals in the 1st round (21st pick) of the 1977 amateur draft. Jones played his first professional season with their Rookie league Gulf Coast Royals and Class A-Advanced Daytona Beach Islanders in 1977, and his last season with the Baltimore Orioles' Triple-A Rochester Red Wings in 1990.
