= Gary Christenson (baseball) =

American baseball player (born 1953)

- Pitcher
- Born: May 5, 1953 (age 73); Mineola, New York, U.S.
- Batted: Left Threw: Left

MLB debut
- September 1, 1979, for the Kansas City Royals

Last MLB appearance
- July 3, 1980, for the Kansas City Royals

MLB statistics
- Win–loss record: 3–0
- Earned run average: 4.71
- Strikeouts: 20
- Stats at Baseball Reference

Teams
- Kansas City Royals (1979–1980)

Gary Richard Christenson (born May 5, 1953) is an American former Major League Baseball pitcher who played for two seasons. He pitched in six games for the Kansas City Royals during the 1979 season and in 24 games during the 1980 season. Christenson finished his major league baseball career undefeated (3–0) and on April 13, 1980, he picked up his lone MLB save. He retired the final batter of the game to preserve a 3–2 Royals victory over the Tigers.
