= Craig Chamberlain =

American baseball player (born 1957)

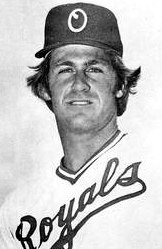
- Chamberlain in 1980
- Pitcher
- Born: February 2, 1957 (age 69); Hollywood, California, U.S.
- Batted: Right Threw: Right

MLB debut
- August 12, 1979, for the Kansas City Royals

Last MLB appearance
- September 28, 1980, for the Kansas City Royals

MLB statistics
- Win–loss record: 4–5
- Earned run average: 4.10
- Innings pitched: 79
- Stats at Baseball Reference

Teams
- Kansas City Royals (1979–1980)

Craig Phillip Chamberlain (born February 2, 1957) is an American former professional baseball player. A pitcher, he appeared in 15 games, including ten starts, in Major League Baseball for the Kansas City Royals in 1979 and 1980. As a rookie with the 1979 Royals, Chamberlain threw three complete game victories in his first three Major League appearances.

Chamberlain was drafted in the first round of the secondary phase of the 1978 Major League Baseball draft after attending Long Beach City College and the University of Arizona. The 6 ft 1 in (1.85 m), 190 lb (86 kg) right-hander made his professional debut in 1979 at the Double-A level and won 12 of 21 decisions, with 11 complete games and a sparkling 2.59 earned run average. In August 1979, the Royals summoned him to the Major Leagues and he made his first start on August 12.

== Three straight complete game wins kicked off MLB career ==
The Royals were then locked in a race for the American League West Division championship, in third place and five games behind the California Angels. In a game against the Detroit Tigers at Royals Stadium, Whitey Herzog, the Kansas City manager, handed the ball to the 22-year-old Chamberlain and gave him the starting assignment in his MLB debut. Chamberlain proceeded to allow only six hits, five of them singles, in a 7–1 triumph, walking two and striking out six.

Five days later, at Memorial Stadium in Baltimore against the Orioles, Chamberlain again got the starting nod and again notched a complete game, 7–1 win. This time, he allowed only three hits (including a home run by Ken Singleton) and two walks to the eventual American League champions, defeating Baseball Hall of Fame pitcher Jim Palmer.

In his third start, on August 24 at home against the Boston Red Sox, Chamberlain was not as effective, allowing ten hits and two earned runs, but he defeated Boston 4–2 and, in the process, bested another future Hall of Famer, Dennis Eckersley, who was then a starting pitcher.

== Starting pitcher during Royals' 1979 stretch run ==
His winning streak ended four days later, on August 28 against the visiting Milwaukee Brewers. He went only five innings, allowing seven hits (including two home runs) and four earned runs, and took the loss in an 11–6 Milwaukee victory.

After a no-decision in his fifth start, against New York at Yankee Stadium, Chamberlain notched his fourth complete game win in his sixth start September 7 at the Kingdome in an eight-hit, 6–2 win over the Seattle Mariners. It would be his last MLB victory and complete game.

Chamberlain continued to take a turn in the Kansas City rotation during September 1979 but lost his last three decisions, to finish 4–4 with a 3.75 earned run average in ten starts and 69 2/3 innings pitched during his rookie campaign. The Royals finished three games behind the Angels in second place in the AL West.

In 1980, the Royals would break through to recapture the division title and win their first American League pennant, but Chamberlain spent the season at Triple-A, winning 11 games but compiling an ineffective 4.76 earned run average with the Omaha Royals. He was recalled in September and made five appearances in relief, but lost his only decision and allowed ten hits and five walks in 9 1/3 innings pitched. It was his last MLB trial. His professional career, however, continued over the next 15 seasons, in the minor leagues (1981–1983; 1987–1988; 1991) and independent league baseball (1995).

As a Major Leaguer, he pitched in 15 games and 79 innings, allowing 78 hits and 23 walks, with 33 strikeouts.

== Post-Playing Career ==
Following the conclusion of his playing career, Chamberlain returned to Los Alamitos, CA where he attended high school at Los Alamitos High School. He has spent over thirty years in the area working as a real estate agent and broker at his own agency.
