= Bill Deegan =

American baseball umpire (1935–2024)

- Born: April 13, 1935; Camden, New Jersey, U.S.
- Died: March 22, 2024 (aged 88)
- Occupation: Former MLB umpire

William Edward John Deegan (April 13, 1935 – March 22, 2024) was an American Major League Baseball umpire who worked in the American League from 1971 to 1980. Deegan wore uniform number 17 when the American League adopted them for its umpires in 1980, later worn by John Hirschbeck.

== Career ==
Deegan was born in Camden, New Jersey. His umpiring career began in the Midwest League in 1967. He also worked in the Carolina and Southern Leagues prior to becoming a major league umpire in 1971. In the majors, he officiated in four American League Championship Series: 1970 (Game One only), 1974, 1977 and 1984. He also umpired in the 1978 All Star Game and the 1976 World Series; he was the home plate umpire for Game Four of the Series, which the defending champion Cincinnati Reds won on the strength of Johnny Bench's two-home run, five-RBI performance to complete a sweep of the New York Yankees. In that game, first base umpire Bruce Froemming ejected Yankees' manager Billy Martin after Martin threw a baseball at Deegan.

Deegan was home plate umpire for two no-hitters in May 1977: Jim Colborn's on May 14 and Dennis Eckersley's on May 30. He is one of a handful of umpires to have called balls and strikes for two no-hitters in the same season, and one of only three in modern history to do so in the same month, Dick Nallin (May, 1917) and Bill Dinneen (September, 1923) being the other two.

Midway into the 1980 season, Deegan quit so that he could pursue other business opportunities.

== After retirement ==
He was working as a salesman in 1984 when he realized the major league umpires were going on strike and would be unavailable for the playoffs. He volunteered his services to work in the 1984 ALCS to Dick Butler, the American League supervisor of umpires, and served as home plate umpire for all three games of the Series, which the Detroit Tigers swept over the Kansas City Royals. The remainder of the crew consisted of local and collegiate umpires.

His work in the 1984 ALCS marked the last time an umpire called balls and strikes in a postseason game using the balloon-style outside chest protector which was common throughout the junior circuit until the early 1980s. Jerry Neudecker was the last active umpire to use the outside protector, retiring after the next season.

Deegan worked during two other umpire strikes: on Opening Day, 1991 at Tiger Stadium (the site of his last major league umpiring stint prior to this one) for the Yankees-Tigers game, and for six games during the 1995 season—the first week of major league play after the strike of 1994-95 ended. Deegan also used the outside chest protector during these two strikes (two games in 1995), which became the last time that type of protector was used. Said Deegan in 1984, “I don’t believe in unions.”

Deegan died on March 22, 2024, at the age of 88.

== See also ==
- List of Major League Baseball umpires (disambiguation)
