= Bill Haller =

American baseball umpire (1935–2022)

William Edward Haller (February 28, 1935 – August 20, 2022) was an American Major League Baseball umpire. Haller officiated 3,068 regular season games in the American League in 1961 and from 1963 to 1982. He also worked 15 American League Championship Series games in four series (1970, 1973, 1976, and 1980), 27 World Series contests in four different years (1968, 1972, 1978, and 1982) and four All-Star games (1963, 1970, 1975, and 1981).

== Life and career ==
Haller was born in Joliet, Illinois, on February 28, 1935.

On September 17, 1980, Haller was wearing a microphone as part of a documentary on umpires. After Haller called a balk on Baltimore pitcher Mike Flanagan in the first inning, the microphone captured an animated tirade directed from Earl Weaver to Haller.

Haller was the home plate umpire when Carl Yastrzemski got his 3000th major league hit on September 12, 1979.

Haller wore uniform number 1 from 1980 through 1982 after the American League adopted uniform numbers. He retired after the 1982 World Series. He was the last umpire to wear the balloon-style chest protector in a World Series game, calling balls and strikes for Game 2 between the Milwaukee Brewers and St. Louis Cardinals.

Upon retirement, Haller served as a supervisor of American League umpires until he was fired shortly after the 1985 season ended. He also worked for the Baseball Umpire Development program as a supervisor until the 1994 season.

Haller was the older brother of former Major League catcher Tom Haller. On July 14, 1972, the umpiring Haller worked the plate in Tiger Stadium when his brother caught for Detroit.

Bill Haller died on August 20, 2022, at the age of 87. At the time, Haller was the last living umpire from any World Series prior to 1973.

== See also ==
- List of Major League Baseball umpires (disambiguation)
