= Paul Pryor =

American baseball umpire (1927-1995)

- Born: John Paul Pryor; July 10, 1927; Woonsocket, Rhode Island, U.S.
- Died: December 15, 1995 (aged 68); St. Petersburg, Florida, U.S.
- Occupation: Umpire
- Years active: 1961-1981
- Employer: National League

John Paul Pryor (July 10, 1927 – December 15, 1995) was an American professional baseball umpire who worked in the National League from 1961 to 1981. Pryor wore uniform number 13 for most of his career. Pryor umpired 3,094 major league games in his 21-year career. He umpired in three World Series (1967, 1973 and 1980), four League Championship Series (1970, 1974, 1977 and 1981) and three All-Star Games (1963, 1971 and 1978).

== Playing and coaching career ==
Pryor was a minor league baseball pitcher from 1945 to 1948 in the St. Louis Cardinals, Philadelphia Athletics and Brooklyn Dodgers organizations. Not long after graduating from High Point College, Pryor came to Denton, North Carolina as a high school football and baseball coach. Pryor umpired in the Winter Leagues in Puerto Rico for two seasons early in his major league career. He later moved to Racine, Wisconsin in order to be able to commute between Chicago and Milwaukee when he was assigned to work Cubs and Braves games. He took offseason teaching and coaching positions at St. Lucy's Parochial School and Dominican College respectively. Mr Pryor was also a gym teacher at Roosevelt Elementary School in Racine.

== Umpiring career ==
=== Early career ===
Pryor's minor league umpiring experience included time in the Georgia State League, Tri-State League, Carolina League, SALLY League (South Atlantic League) and American Association. He was promoted to the major leagues in September 1961. Pryor suffered broken teeth in 1965 when a Willie Stargell foul ball smashed into his mask.

=== Later career ===
Pryor and umpire Ted Hendry signed new major league contracts just prior to the 1979 season, so they began to umpire that year when other umpires were striking. After two games, Pryor felt pressured to join the striking umpires, but the league quickly ordered him back to work citing a mandatory ten-day notice period. Pryor umpired until he was able to join the strike on April 16. Pryor and the league's other umpires returned to the field when the strike was settled the next month. In his last major league season, Pryor ejected César Cedeño after Cedeno had to be separated from a heckling fan.

Pryor retired from umpiring in 1981 after struggling with foot problems. His last series was the League Championship Series between the Los Angeles Dodgers and the Montreal Expos in 1981 in which the Dodgers prevailed in five games. He recorded only thirty ejections in 21 seasons in the majors, including a stretch of nearly five years (1972 - 1977) without an ejection.

== Paul Pryor Travel Bags ==
In the 1970s, Paul designed a duffel bag for umpire equipment. Within a few years, Paul Pryor Travel Bags was founded. At one time, the company had accounts with the NCAA in all sports, Major League Baseball, the National Football League, the Canadian Football League as well as numerous local schools and businesses. In 1992, the company was purchased by Bob Milleman, who remains majority shareholder and president.

== Personal life ==
In addition to teaching and umpiring, Pryor worked stints as a car salesman and a referee for the Central States Football League. He also worked in sales for Schaeffer Beer, Strohs Beer. He was also in demand as a public speaker. Pryor maintained his teaching and coaching position in Wisconsin during the baseball offseasons, with an arrangement to leave that job early for the start of the major league season. He was married to the late Carleen Hammond of Hendersonville, N.C. They had four children and two grandchildren.

== See also ==
- List of Major League Baseball umpires (disambiguation)
