= Fred Spenn =

American former baseball umpire (born 1945)

- Born: May 4, 1945 (age 80); Monroe, Michigan, U.S.
- Occupation: Former MLB umpire

Frederick Charles Spenn (born May 4, 1945) is an American former baseball umpire. Spenn was one of the eight minor league replacement umpires who was promoted to the major leagues during the 1979 Major League Umpires Association strike. Spenn wore uniform number 32 when the American League adopted them for its umpires in 1980.

== Minor league career ==
Spenn began umpiring minor league baseball in 1970. He officiated in the Carolina League, Southern League and American Association prior to becoming a major league umpire during the 1979 strike.

While umpiring in the Southern League in 1972, Spenn was chased and struck with a bat by Savannah Braves hurler Pablo Torrealba after a called third strike on the pitcher. The bat broke across Spenn's back. Torrealba was suspended for the rest of the season. Spenn received a $50 fine and a reprimand for abusive language.

== Major league baseball ==
Before his promotion in 1979, Spenn had served as an American League reserve umpire for the previous two seasons, substituting in 95 major league games during that time. Spenn umpired through the 1980 MLB season, after which he was fired. He appeared in one game during the threatened umpire strike of 1991, after which MLB umpires went back to work. He was the last umpire to join the American League using the outside chest protector. He used this through the 1979 season. He switched to the inside protector for 1980.

Spenn was home plate umpire for Bert Blyleven's no-hitter on September 22, 1977.

== See also ==
- List of Major League Baseball umpires (disambiguation)
