= Marty Springstead =

American baseball umpire (1937-2012)

- Umpire
- Born: July 9, 1937; Nyack, New York, U.S.
- Died: January 17, 2012 (aged 74); Sarasota, Florida, U.S.

MLB debut
- 1966

Career highlights and awards
- Crew chief: World Series (1973, 1983); ALCS (1974)

Martin John Springstead (July 9, 1937 – January 17, 2012) was an American umpire in Major League Baseball who worked in the American League from 1966 to 1985 and had since worked as an umpire supervisor. He was the youngest umpire ever to serve as crew chief in the World Series, heading the staff for the 1973 Series at the age of 36 years and 3 months.

== Early life and career ==
Springstead was born in Nyack, New York. Springstead graduated from Mount Saint Michael Academy in the Bronx, where he played basketball and ran track as well as playing baseball. He then attended Fairleigh Dickinson University in Teaneck, New Jersey, majoring in advertising. After a brief playing career as a catcher for American Legion and semi-pro teams, he attended the Al Somers Umpire School and began his career in the Class "C" Northern League in 1960. In 1961–1962 he served in the Army's 2nd Armored Division at Fort Hood, Texas, where he continued to play in and officiate baseball games. He then worked in the Southern League (1963–65) before joining the AL staff in 1966. Throughout his career he lived in the communities of Garnerville and Suffern, both near his birthplace.

== Major league career ==
Springstead officiated in the All-Star Game in 1969, 1975, and 1982. In addition to the 1973 World Series, he also worked the 1978 and 1983 Series, again serving as crew chief in 1983. Springstead, who became an AL crew chief in 1974, also officiated four American League Championship Series in 1970 (Games 2–3), 1974, 1977 and 1981. He also officiated in five no-hitters, including being the home plate umpire for two: Clyde Wright's on July 3, 1970 and Mike Warren's on September 29, 1983. Springstead wore uniform number 4 starting in 1980, when the AL adopted numbers. Upon his retirement, the number was assigned to Tim Tschida, who continued to wear No. 4 in the AL and then on MLB's combined umpiring staff until his retirement in 2012. Number 4 is currently worn by Chad Fairchild.

Springstead used the outside chest protector for most of his career, as it was required for American League umpires through the 1974 season. He switched to using the inside protector for the 1983 season, never using the outside protector again.

One of the most controversial decisions of Springstead's career occurred on a rainy night at Exhibition Stadium on September 15, 1977. With his team trailing 4–0 after 4 1/2 innings, Baltimore Orioles manager Earl Weaver requested that the umpires instruct the grounds crew to remove a tarpaulin covering one of the pitcher's mounds in the Toronto Blue Jays' bullpen in foul territory down the left-field line. He claimed that it was a hazard for the ballplayers if they had to make plays in that area of the field. After Springstead, who was working at third base that evening, denied the request, Weaver pulled his team off the field. When the Oriole players did not return five minutes later, Springstead declared a forfeit and awarded the Blue Jays a 4–0 win. On another infamous occasion, in Cleveland, Weaver stormed to the dugout and returned to the field with a rulebook in his pocket. "Don't take that book out or you're outta here," Springstead warned. Weaver pulled it out anyway and was ejected. After that game, Weaver said of Springstead, "He's a terrific guy...He's just not a very good umpire."

Springstead served as an MLB umpire supervisor until he was fired (along with fellow supervisors Rich Garcia and Jim McKean) in January 2010. MLB did not cite specific reasons for the firings, but Springstead said the actions were related to a series of missed calls by the umpires who worked the 2009 baseball postseason. Rob Manfred, executive vice president for MLB, said, "The change in supervisors is part of our ongoing effort to make our organization as strong as possible."

== Later life and death ==
Springstead retired from field duties after the 1985 season and became the AL's fourth Executive Director of Umpires on January 1, 1986, succeeding Dick Butler. In 2000, when the umpiring staffs of the American and National Leagues were combined, he became a special assistant to Major League Baseball's vice president for umpiring.

He was a popular guest speaker and conducted umpiring clinics for the Japanese Professional Umpires of the Pacific League; in addition, he taught umpiring in Canada and for the United States Air Force in Spain, Holland and Germany. Springstead died of a heart attack on January 17, 2012, while swimming near his home in Sarasota, Florida. He was 74. Having served with the United States Army, Springstead was buried as a veteran at Sarasota National Cemetery in Sarasota County, Florida.

== See also ==
- List of Major League Baseball umpires (disambiguation)
