= Frank Pulli =

American baseball umpire (1935-2013)

- Born: March 22, 1935; Easton, Pennsylvania, U.S.
- Died: August 28, 2013 (aged 78); Palm Harbor, Florida, U.S.
- Occupation: Umpire
- Years active: 1972–1999
- Employer: Major League Baseball

Frank Victor Pulli (March 22, 1935 – August 28, 2013) was an American professional baseball umpire, working in the National League from 1972 until 1999. He umpired many postseason games, including four World Series. Pulli wore uniform number 14 during his career.

== Umpiring career ==
During his career, Pulli officiated in four World Series (1978, 1983, 1990 as crew chief, and 1995), six National League Championship Series (1975, 1979, 1986, 1991, 1993, and 1997), four National League Division Series (1981, 1995, 1996 and 1998), and two All-Star games (1977, and 1988 as crew chief). He also was the first base umpire in the April 8, 1974, game in which Hank Aaron broke Babe Ruth's home run record.

In 1989, Pulli and fellow umpire Rich Garcia were placed on probation by baseball commissioner Fay Vincent, when Vincent learned that they had placed bets on non-baseball sporting events with an illegal bookmaker. Don Zimmer, who at the time was the manager of the Chicago Cubs, was also placed on probation by Vincent for the same offense. These punishments came on the heels of Pete Rose's lifetime banishment for gambling by Vincent's predecessor, the late A. Bartlett Giamatti.

Pulli was also one of 22 umpires who participated in the 1999 Major League Umpires Association mass resignation, orchestrated by the association's executive director, Richie Phillips. In response to the resignation, Major League Baseball hired replacement umpires. Subsequently, Pulli was one of 13 umpires who was not rehired by the league. Instead, he was allowed to retire and was later hired back as an umpire supervisor.

=== Notable events ===
==== 1978 World Series ====
Pulli was involved in a controversial play in Game 4 of the 1978 World Series. In the 6th inning, New York Yankees outfielder Lou Piniella hit a low line drive to shortstop. Los Angeles Dodgers shortstop Bill Russell dropped the ball momentarily (not ruled a catch by second base umpire Joe Brinkman), stepped on second, and then threw towards first. His throw however caromed off the leg of Reggie Jackson, standing in the baseline between first and second, and went behind first base. Thurman Munson scored (in part due to Steve Garvey stopping to argue before chasing the ball down) to make it a 3–2 game, but Dodgers manager Tommy Lasorda immediately argued that Jackson should have been called out for interference. Pulli (umpiring at first base) maintained that Jackson did not "intentionally" interfere with the throw (despite Jackson ever-so-slightly shifting his leg to cause the ball to hit it) and the play stood. The Yankees went on to win Game 4, 4–3 in 10 innings, then the series in Game 6. In his autobiography, Jackson described his involvement in the play as a "sacrifice thigh."

==== 1979 NLCS ====
Pulli was involved in another controversial call during Game 2 of the 1979 National League Championship Series. In the top of the fifth inning, Phil Garner of the Pittsburgh Pirates hit a hard line drive that Cincinnati Reds right fielder Dave Collins appeared to catch. However, Pulli ruled that Collins had trapped the ball, a call that proved significant when Garner scored later that inning and gave the Pirates the lead. The Pirates won the game, 3–2 in ten innings, and eventually the series.

==== Early use of instant replay ====
Pulli was the first umpire to use instant replay during a major league game, albeit not in accordance with league rules. On May 31, 1999, the Florida Marlins were hosting the St. Louis Cardinals when Pulli, the crew chief of that game's umpires, used instant replay to review a home run call. The Marlins' Cliff Floyd hit a ball to the top of the left field scoreboard, near the yellow line that separated in-play from out-of-play. The hit was originally ruled a double by another umpire, then changed to a home run after the umpires conferred, then reverted to being a double after Pulli watched a replay via a television camera's monitor. The Cardinals won the game, 5–2. National League president Len Coleman subsequently stated that Pulli had erred in using instant replay. The use of instant replay in Major League Baseball would not be adopted until 2008.

=== Use of QuesTec ===
After his retirement, Pulli's experience as an umpire was instrumental in baseball's use of the QuesTec, an advanced technology that allowed baseball to observe and grade the home plate umpire's ability to call balls and strikes. Many umpires, including Ted Barrett, believed that the use of the technology dramatically changed the way umpires judged the strike zone and that he, and others, adjusted their calls to the technology. In Bruce Weber's 2009 book on umpiring, Barrett claimed that Pulli would call him after games and encourage him to shrink his strike zone after watching Barrett call pitches several inches off the plate as strikes.

== Personal life ==
Pulli was born in Easton, Pennsylvania, and died in Palm Harbor, Florida, on August 28, 2013, due to complications from Parkinson's disease.

== See also ==
- List of Major League Baseball umpires (disambiguation)
