= 1999 Major League Umpires Association mass resignation =

1999 Major League Baseball labor dispute

The 1999 Major League Umpires Association mass resignation was a labor tactic used by 68 Major League Baseball (MLB) umpires, including 66 members of the Major League Umpires Association (MLUA), the official umpires union at the time. Unable to strike because they had a labor agreement in place at the time, 57 umpires formally resigned by orchestrated letters in an attempt to force negotiations with MLB for a new labor agreement. The American and National Leagues instead immediately hired new umpires and accepted 22 of the resignations. The union membership became fractured on the issue, and the umpires tried to rescind their resignations, but the MLUA was unsuccessful in retaining the jobs of the 22 umpires and the resignations were seen as final. The incident led to the decertification of the MLUA and the formation of a new union, the World Umpires Association (WUA), now the Major League Baseball Umpires Association.

== Background ==
After its certification in 1969, the MLUA had organized several strikes, including one before the playoffs in 1970. In addition, the union's members were locked out multiple times. One of these lockouts occurred at the start of the 1995 season and lasted for more than 80 games per team before the sides reached a collective bargaining agreement. It was set to expire after 1999, and the MLUA became concerned that MLB would again lock out the umpires.

Entering the 1999 MLB season, the union was dealing with disagreements with MLB on a variety of issues. The league sought to make it easier to replace umpires, and proposed a restructuring of the umpiring system; instead of MLUA members answering to the American and National Leagues, MLB wanted them under the control of the commissioner. In addition, MLB wanted changes in the strike zone that umpires called during games. The commissioner's office ordered that pitches high in the zone be called strikes. This went against common practice and brought objections from the umpires and MLUA leadership, which believed that the collective bargaining agreement was being violated. The MLUA also had a complaint against the Major League Baseball Players Association, when it released a survey of players, which included umpire ratings, publicly. During the season, there were numerous disputes between umpires and MLB owners. One involved Tom Hallion, who was suspended for three days by NL president Leonard Coleman after bumping a player. Another regarded the amount of pay owed to umpires who officiated the exhibition games between the Baltimore Orioles and Cuban national baseball team.

== Resignations ==
On July 14, the umpires held a meeting in Philadelphia. There, they held a vote proposing a strike, which passed; however, the collective bargaining agreement was still in place. With that in mind, the union decided on a different course of action: a mass resignation by umpires. Richie Phillips, the MLUA's leader, announced on July 15 that 57 umpires would resign, effective September 2. According to umpire Dave Phillips, the resignations were intended to force negotiations with MLB to gain a new contract, effective at the start of 2000. Richie Phillips added that MLUA members stood to gain about $15 million of severance pay. The union intended to have the leagues negotiate in the future with a newly formed corporation, to be created after the mass resignation occurred.

Out of the 68 MLB umpires, all but two (Derryl Cousins and John Shulock, who were barred from the MLUA after working as replacements during the 1979 umpires' strike) were members of the MLUA. Thirty-four National League umpires sent letters of resignation through the MLUA, along with 23 umpires who worked in the American League. Within a week, several of the umpires moved to rescind their earlier actions. One of them, Dave Phillips, said that "Most people in that room thought they (the resignation letters) were going to be signed but not sent." He said that the umpires thought they could rescind any time before September 2, which was not the case. In response, Richie Phillips called his views "nonsense". The union filed a lawsuit in the U.S. District Court in Philadelphia on July 26, seeking to allow withdrawals. One day later, the MLUA's request for a temporary restraining order was turned down by Judge Edmund V. Ludwig. Later that day, the 42 umpires whose resignations were still active rescinded as a group.

The leagues hired a combined 25 replacements from the minor leagues and elected to rehire only enough umpires to reach their maximum allowed squad sizes, retaining their new hires. The American League brought back the 14 umpires whose rescissions were received by the league the fastest. A different approach was required for the National League, which received one batch of rescissions; it opted to use "performance standards" in deciding which umpires to rehire. Overall, MLB accepted the resignations of 13 umpires from the National League and 9 from the American League. On August 3, the union filed unfair labor practice charges against MLB with the National Labor Relations Board (NLRB). A week later, the MLUA dropped the suit it had filed in federal court in July. The president of the MLUA, Jerry Crawford, left the prospect of a strike open. In response, the presidents of the two leagues threatened to fire any umpire who took part in a strike.

On August 27, the MLUA requested arbitration from the American Arbitration Association, but both leagues turned it down. The MLUA then returned to U.S. District Court three days later, in hopes of obtaining an injunction against the leagues' acceptances of the resignations. Instead of the quick ruling the union was seeking, Judge J. Curtis Joyner desired negotiations between the sides, which he oversaw. On September 1, the parties agreed on a severance package, which confirmed the loss of the 22 umpires' jobs. The MLUA pledged not to strike in the agreement.

== MLUA division and decertification ==
A group of remaining umpires was critical of the mass resignation and moved for the creation of a new union and decertification of the MLUA in October; the Major League Umpires Independent Organizing Committee, the name the group went by, primarily consisted of American League umpires. The Organizing Committee's main motivation was to force out Richie Phillips. Joe Brinkman and John Hirschbeck publicly supported the idea of a new union with different leadership; Brinkman said, "There's no room for Richie Phillips in this new organization." Phillips, along with his backers, criticized the umpires seeking his ouster, saying they were at fault for what happened in July.

Ballots were sent to all umpires in early November, allowing the umpires to vote on whether they wanted the MLUA or a replacement union to represent them. Those whose resignations had been accepted were sent ballots in the decertification election, as were the new hires. On November 30, the NLRB tallied the votes and revealed that the Organizing Committee had garnered 57 votes, as opposed to 35 for the MLUA. The MLUA appealed to the NLRB, but a hearing officer upheld the results on January 21. One final appeal was issued by the MLUA, but a three-person NLRB panel rejected it in February, and certified the World Umpires Association (WUA) as the umpires' new union.

== Aftermath ==
Although the MLUA was no longer representing active umpires, it still did so for the 22 who lost their jobs. In negotiations for a new labor agreement, which was signed in September 2000, the MLUA turned down an offer from MLB owners that would have seen 13 umpires brought back. An arbitrator ordered in December 2001 that nine of the twenty-two umpires be reinstated, and MLB reached an agreement to do so in February 2002; four of the umpires retired with back pay. Three umpires were rehired by MLB in 2002, and Rich Garcia was given a supervisor position. In late 2004, a labor agreement between MLB and the MLUA gave jobs back to three more umpires, while the remaining six gained severance pay. By that time, half of the terminated umpires were working again in MLB. One side effect of the WUA's formation was the end of separate umpiring staffs for the American and National Leagues. Beginning with the 2000 season, every umpire would work in both leagues.

Below is a table summarizing what happened to the 22 umpires whose resignations (during the mass-resignation effort) were accepted by the two leagues.

Umpire	Year born	Employer in 1999	Status
Drew Coble	1947	AL	Retired with back pay; never returned to major league umpiring
Greg Kosc	1949	AL	Retired with back pay; never returned to major league umpiring
Frank Pulli	1935	NL	Retired with back pay; never returned to major league umpiring, and died in 2013
Terry Tata	1940	NL	Retired with back pay; never returned to major league umpiring
Gary Darling	1957	NL	Rehired in 2002; retired in 2014. Serves on the Board of Directors for umpires' charity organization.
Bill Hohn	1955	NL	Rehired in 2002; worked through end of 2010 season before retiring for health reasons
Larry Poncino	1957	NL	Rehired in 2002; retired in 2007 after injury, and died in 2024
Larry Vanover	1955	NL	Rehired in 2002; became MLB oldest umpire in 2024; retired after 2024 season
Joe West	1952	NL	Rehired in 2002; became MLB all-time leader in games umpired in 2021; retired after 2021 season
Bruce Dreckman	1970	NL	Rehired in 2002 with no back pay
Sam Holbrook	1965	NL	Rehired in 2002 with no back pay; retired in 2022
Paul Nauert	1963	NL	Rehired in 2002 with no back pay; retired in 2022
Rich Garcia	1942	AL	Never returned as an umpire but worked as MLB umpire supervisor until he was fired in 2010
Bob Davidson	1952	NL	Rehired in 2005; retired in 2016
Tom Hallion	1956	NL	Rehired in 2005; retired in 2022
Ed Hickox	1962	AL	Rehired in 2005; retired in 2023
Jim Evans	1946	AL	Retired with severance; never returned to major league umpiring
Dale Ford	1942	AL	Retired with severance; never returned to major league umpiring
Eric Gregg	1951	NL	Retired with severance; never returned to major league umpiring, and died in 2006
Mark Johnson	1950	AL	Retired with severance; never returned to major league umpiring, and died in 2016
Ken Kaiser	1945	AL	Retired with severance; never returned to major league umpiring, and died in 2017
Larry McCoy	1941	AL	Retired with severance; never returned to major league umpiring

== Bibliography ==
- Alcaro, Frederick (2003). "When in Doubt, Get Locked Out!: A Comparison of the 2001 Lockout of the National Football League Referees' Association and the Failed 1999 Resignation Scheme of the Major League Baseball Umpires Association". University of Pennsylvania Journal of Labor and Employment Law. 5 (2): 335–361. Archived from the original on October 7, 2014.
