= Jerry Crawford =

American baseball umpire (born 1947)

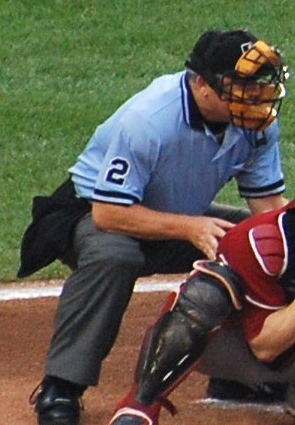
- Crawford in 2009
- Born: August 13, 1947 (age 79); Philadelphia, Pennsylvania, U.S.
- Occupation: Former MLB umpire
- Years active: 1976–2010
- Height: 5 ft 11 in (180 cm)

Gerald Joseph Crawford (born August 13, 1947) is an American former umpire in Major League Baseball. He first umpired in the National League from 1977 to 1999, then worked in both major leagues from 2000 to 2010.

== Career ==
He was a crew chief from 1998 through 2010. He is the brother of National Basketball Association (NBA) referee Joe Crawford and the son of former major league umpire Shag Crawford. He wore number 2, the same number that his father wore at the end of his career (From 1996 to 1999 he wore number 40, after the National League retired number 2 for the Hall of Fame umpire Jocko Conlan; he returned to number 2 after the NL and AL umpiring staffs were unified in 2000.).

He worked in the playoffs 18 times, including every season from 1998 through 2006. He appeared in five World Series (1988, 1992, 1998, 2000, and 2002), serving as crew chief in 1992 and 2002; twelve League Championship Series (1980, 1983, 1985, 1990, 1993, 1995, 1996, 1999, 2001, 2003, 2005, and 2006), with all but the last two being in the NL; and five Division Series (1981, 2000, 2002, 2004, and 2010). His 11th appearance in the League Championship Series in 2005 broke the record he had previously shared with Bruce Froemming. He also umpired in the All-Star Game in 1989 and was the home plate umpire for the 2006 All-Star Game. On May 23, 2002, Crawford was the second base umpire for Shawn Green's four-homer game. He was at third when Carlos Delgado hit four homers on September 25, 2003. His father had worked home plate for the first game at Philadelphia’s Veterans Stadium on April 10, 1971; Crawford worked home plate for the last game at "The Vet" on September 28, 2003 and again when Citizens Bank Park opened.

Crawford was the president of the Major League Umpires Association in 1999 when the umpires attempted a mass-resignation strategy. The strategy was unsuccessful. While Crawford kept his job, 22 umpires' resignations were accepted. Some later regained their major league positions, others were promised a position as soon as a vacancy occurred, and some were offered settlements that did not include a return to the field. Out of loyalty to Richie Phillips, the MLUA executive director and his closest friend and his fellow NL umpires who were terminated by MLB, he did not join the World Umpires Association, the successor umpires union to MLUA.

Crawford's 2010 crew included Chris Guccione, Phil Cuzzi and Brian O'Nora. Crawford announced his retirement effective at the end of the 2010 season due to back problems.

== See also ==
- List of Major League Baseball umpires (disambiguation)
