= Eric Gregg =

American baseball umpire (1951-2006)

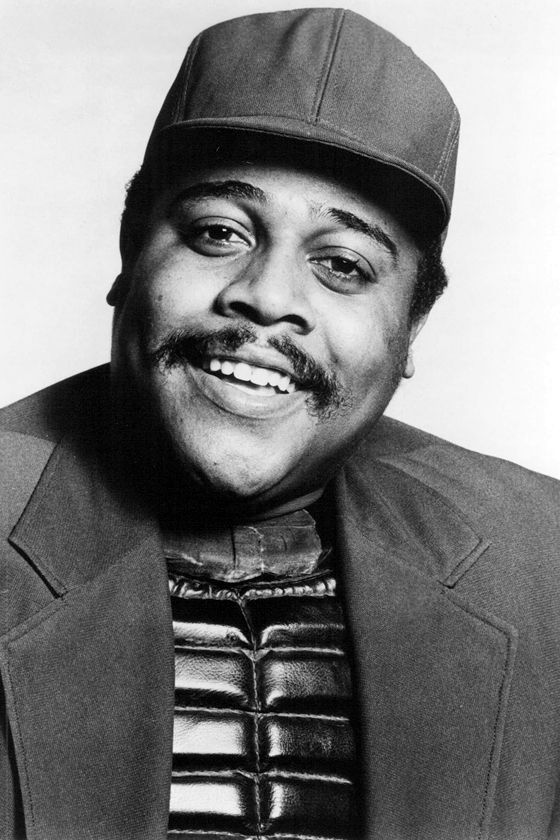
- Gregg in 1980
- Born: Eric Eugene Gregg; May 18, 1951; Philadelphia, Pennsylvania, U.S.
- Died: June 5, 2006 (aged 55); Philadelphia, Pennsylvania, U.S.
- Occupation: Baseball umpire
- Spouse: Conchita Camilo (m. December 31, 1974)
- Children: 4

Eric Eugene Gregg (May 18, 1951 – June 5, 2006) was an American umpire in Major League Baseball who worked in the National League from 1975 to 1999. He was known for being a pioneering black umpire, his longtime weight problems, and his controversial home plate umpiring in Game 5 of the 1997 National League Championship Series—when his generous strike zone helped the Florida Marlins' Liván Hernández strike out 15 Atlanta Braves batters. Throughout his National League career, Gregg wore uniform number 7.

== Umpiring career ==
Gregg was born in Philadelphia, Pennsylvania. His major league career began at the age of 24, making him one of the youngest umpires in major league history.

He was only the third black umpire in the major leagues, following Emmett Ashford and Art Williams. He officiated in the 1989 World Series, and was the third base umpire for Game 3, which was postponed due to the Loma Prieta earthquake, but since the series ended in four games, he did not get to work behind home plate, as happened to Ashford in the 1970 World Series. He also worked in four National League Championship Series (1981, 1987, 1991, 1997), as well as the 1995 and 1996 National League Division Series and the 1986 All-Star Game at the Houston Astrodome.

He was the home plate umpire for two no-hitters (Terry Mulholland in 1990 and Ramón Martínez in 1995) and worked third base for Tom Browning's perfect game on September 16, 1988. On August 8, 1988, Gregg was the home plate umpire for the first night game at Wrigley Field. The Phillies and Cubs were rained out and the first official game was played August 9, 1988.

Gregg was the subject of controversy for his large strike zone during Game 5 of the 1997 NLCS, where Marlins pitcher Liván Hernández recorded a career-high 15 strikeouts against Atlanta with Gregg calling strikes on pitches that were often so far out of the strike zone that a hitter would not have made contact if he had swung at the ball. As Gregg was calling the wide zone on left handed batters only, it significantly favored Florida due to Atlanta's lineup being predominantly left handed. His work in the game was voted by Baseball America as the third-worst umpire performance of the 1975–2000 era. Game 5 of the 1997 NLCS became known as the "Eric Gregg Game". Gregg continued to umpire in 1998 and a portion of the 1999 season but was not selected for post-season duties again.

=== Resignation ===
Gregg was one of 22 umpires who resigned in 1999 as part of a labor action. Richie Phillips, executive director of the umpires' union, felt that Major League Baseball might reconsider its stance in contract negotiations rather than doling out millions of dollars in severance pay. Instead, MLB chose to accept the resignations, though they later rehired several of those who had resigned. On August 7, 2001, Robert A. Brady, a member of the United States House of Representatives from Philadelphia, wrote a letter with 25 other House members urging Commissioner Bud Selig to rehire Gregg, but Selig refused.

== Weight problems ==
Gregg battled weight troubles throughout his career. His weight was generally listed between 315–325 pounds (143–147 kg), but Gregg admitted that this was often an understatement and that he frequently approached 400 pounds (180 kg). In 1996, fellow umpire John McSherry died in Cincinnati of a heart attack; the two had planned for a long time to try to lose weight together, but McSherry's death motivated Gregg to take a leave of absence from umpiring and enter a program at Duke University. Actor Bill Murray once quipped about Gregg that "he looked like the Michelin Man. If he had to haul ass right now, he'd have to make about 6 trips."

His frame, still hefty and recognizable despite the weight loss, encouraged publicity for Gregg. He was honorary commissioner of the Wing Bowl, an annual competitive eating event in Philadelphia, and also umped at various celebrity softball events. He also occasionally worked at Chickie's & Pete's Philadelphia restaurant and at the restaurant's stand at Veterans Stadium as a bartender and server. Aside from his girth, he was also well known for his jocular personality and wide smile, which had a disarming effect on game participants who took issue with his calls.

In 1999, Gregg was fined $5,000 by the National League for exceeding a 300-pound (140 kg) weight limit.

== Personal life ==
On December 31, 1974, he married Conchita Camilo, with whom he had four children.

His autobiography, Working the Plate (written with Marty Appel), was published in 1990.

Gregg's son Kevin has worked with numerous sports teams in the public relations department, and currently serves with the Philadelphia Phillies as Vice President of Baseball Communications, winning at the Winter Meetings the 2022 Robert O. Fishel Award for Public Relations Excellence. Son Eric Joseito was well known as a lacrosse coach before becoming an account executive at Dell EMC in the Philadelphia area. Gregg's daughter Ashley Gabrielle was named for Ashley Abbott of the Sony Pictures Television daytime drama The Young and the Restless. Gregg mentioned in his autobiography that umpires who usually work night games were prone to watch network television dramas; a photo of him with Eileen Davidson is in the book. Eric and Conchita have another son, Jamie.

=== Death ===
Gregg suffered a stroke at age 55 on June 4, 2006, and died the following day.

== See also ==
- List of Major League Baseball umpires (disambiguation)
