= John Shulock =

American baseball umpire (1947–2025)

- Born: John Richard Shulock; April 29, 1947; Lockport, New York, U.S.
- Died: June 5, 2025 (aged 78); Vero Beach, Florida, U.S.
- Occupation: Umpire
- Years active: 1979–1999 (AL), 2000–2002 (MLB)
- Employer(s): American League, Major League Baseball

John Richard Shulock (April 29, 1947 – June 5, 2025) was an American professional baseball umpire who worked in the American League from 1979 to 1999 and throughout Major League Baseball between 2000 and 2002. Shulock wore number 29 when the AL adopted them for its umpires in 1980, and retained the number when the NL and AL umpire staffs merged in 2000. Shulock umpired 3,050 major league games in his 24-year career. He umpired in two World Series (1985 and 1992), two All-Star Games (1983 and 1994), four American League Championship Series (1988, 1993, 1998 and 2001), and two American League Division Series (1996 and 1999).

== Playing career ==
After earning fourteen varsity letters at Vero Beach High School in Florida, Shulock played minor league baseball in the Minnesota Twins organization.

== Umpiring career ==
=== 1979 MLB umpire strike ===
Shulock was promoted to the American League as a replacement during the umpire strike that spanned the first seven weeks of the 1979 major league season. When the regular major league umpires returned to work, Shulock and seven other replacement umpires were retained in the major leagues. Crossing the picket lines would affect Shulock's relationships with MLB umpires for at least several years. "To this day, there are still hard feelings," American League crew chief Don Denkinger said in 1994. Backlash against Shulock may have been particularly harsh because he was felt to have enough talent to make the big leagues under non-strike conditions. Shulock was never allowed to join the Major League Umpires Association (MLUA) because of his actions in the 1979 umpire strike. When that union was decertified following the failed 1999 mass resignation, Shulock and fellow replacement umpire Derryl Cousins were permitted to join the new union, the Major League Baseball Umpires Association (then known as the World Umpires Association), and became eligible for all benefits including retirement. By the time he died during the 2025 season, Shulock was respected by his fellow MLB umpires, who wore a "JS" patch on their left sleeve for the remainder of the season in remembrance.

=== Notable games ===
Shulock was the second base umpire for Nolan Ryan's sixth career no-hitter on June 11, 1990.

In September 1999, Shulock was fined and suspended for three games following a confrontation with Tampa Bay Devil Rays catcher Mike DiFelice during an Anaheim Angels at Tampa Bay Rays game. In the game's third inning, Shulock was struck in the mask by a fastball from pitcher Wilson Alvarez. Thinking he had been intentionally targeted by Alvarez and that DiFelice made no effort to catch the ball, Shulock charged toward the mound until he was intercepted by DiFelice. He was cited by league officials for display of temper, overly aggressive behavior and physical contact with DiFelice. He was also disciplined for inappropriate public remarks when he told reporters, "I hope somebody smokes a line drive off [Alvarez's] head. I'll be the first to laugh."

Shulock was the second base umpire for Rickey Henderson's 3,000th hit on October 7, 2001; that game was also Tony Gwynn's final MLB game.

== Death ==
Shulock died at home on June 5, 2025, at the age of 78.

== See also ==
- List of Major League Baseball umpires (disambiguation)
