= Dan Bellino =

American baseball umpire (born 1978)

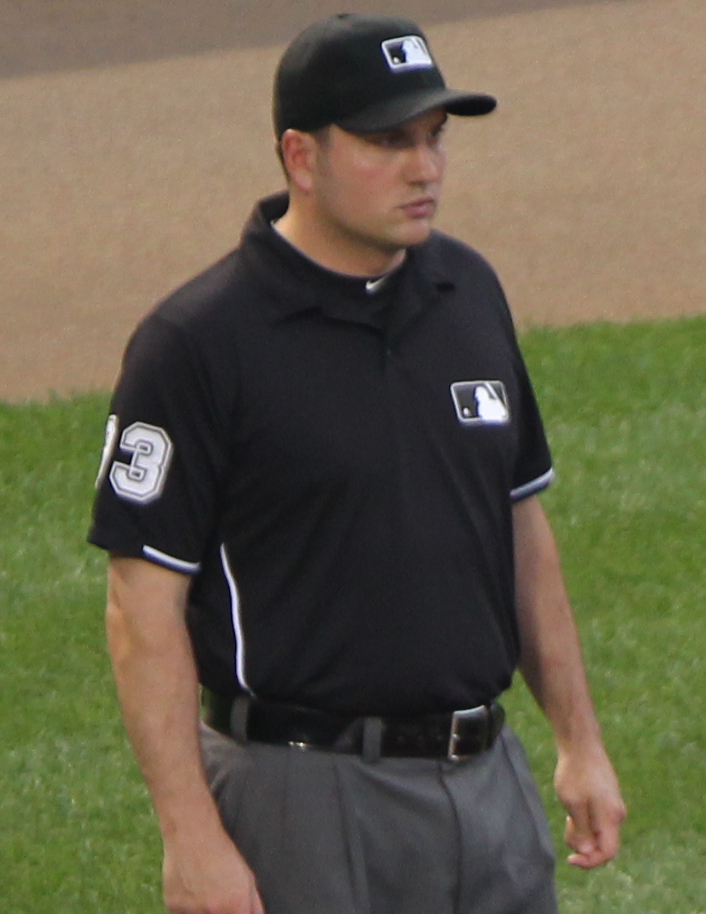
- Bellino in 2011

MLB – No. 2
- Umpire
- Born: October 10, 1978 (age 48); Chicago, Illinois, U.S.

MLB debut
- June 25, 2008

Crew information
- Umpiring crew: A
- Crew members: #2 Dan Bellino (crew chief); #90 Mark Ripperger; #43 Shane Livensparger; #3 Dan Merzel

Career highlights and awards
- Special assignments: All-Star Game (2016); Wild Card Game/Series (2020, 2023); Division Series (2014, 2015, 2016, 2017, 2018, 2020, 2021, 2024, 2025, 2026); League Championship Series (2019, 2023); World Series (2021, 2026); World Baseball Classic (2023, 2026); MLB Little League Classic (2021)

Daniel Anthony Bellino (born October 10, 1978) is an American umpire in Major League Baseball.

== Education ==
Bellino was a catcher for his high school, Loyola Academy in Wilmette, Illinois. He attended Northern Illinois University and managed the men's basketball team under Head Coach Brian Hammel. During his studies at the NIU College of Business, Dan was selected and attended a semester at Oxford University in England. He holds a J.D. from the University of Illinois Chicago, has an MBA from the Brennan School of Business, and has passed the Illinois bar exam.

== Umpiring career ==
Bellino has umpired Major League Baseball games since the 2008 season. He was promoted to crew chief in 2023.

On May 4, 2022 at LoanDepot Park, Bellino, umpiring first base, ejected Arizona Diamondbacks pitcher Madison Bumgarner from a game after the top of the first inning. Bellino stared at the pitcher and held his hand for an abnormally long time during a standard routine foreign substance check spot. During this check Bumgarner, who was looking down at his hand, looked up, noticed, and asked something. Bellino then ejected Bumgarner almost immediately, infuriating him, as he had to be restrained by bench coach Jeff Banister. It was the first time in Major League history that a pitcher was ejected during a foreign substance check in which the pitcher was neither accused nor had a sticky substance. Two days later, Bellino issued a public apology and faced undisclosed discipline from MLB. Bumgarner addressed Bellino's apology and said that it was not directed at him.

In 2025, Bellino became the president of the Major League Baseball Umpires Association.

== Outside baseball ==
Bellino worked for the law firm of Morici, Figioli & Associates and served as an aide for federal judge Charles P. Kocoras before attending umpire school. Holding both Juris Doctor (JD) and MBA degrees, Bellino's terminal law school research paper concerned the major league umpire union and 1999 umpires' strike. In 2008, Dan and his father Tony acquired the RE/MAX Superior Properties office in Huntley, Illinois. Currently, he manages a suburban law firm and serves as "of counsel" for the international law firm Lowis & Gellen LLP based in Chicago, IL. Bellino also owns and manages Elite Extremity MRI of Wisconsin.

== Personal life ==
He lives in Lakewood, Illinois, with his wife and their three children. Dan's oldest son is named after his brother, who died unexpectedly during Dan's childhood.

== See also ==
- List of Major League Baseball umpires (disambiguation)
