= Ken Kaiser =

American baseball umpire (1945-2017)

- Born: July 26, 1945; Rochester, New York, US
- Died: August 8, 2017 (aged 72); Rochester, New York, US
- Occupation: MLB umpire
- Years active: 1977–1999
- Height: 6 ft 3 in (1.91 m)

Kenneth John Kaiser (July 26, 1945 – August 8, 2017) was an American umpire in Major League Baseball who worked in the American League from 1977 to 1999. He spent 13 years in the minor leagues and 23 years in the major leagues, a total of 36 years in professional baseball. Kaiser wore uniform number 21 when the AL adopted numbers for umpires in 1980.

== Umpiring career ==
Kaiser officiated in the World Series in 1987 and 1997, as well as the All-Star Game in 1991. He also umpired in the American League Championship Series in 1980, 1988, 1993 and 1995 (Game 6), and in the American League Division Series in 1981, 1996 and 1997. He also worked the single-game playoff to decide the AL West champion in 1995. On May 6, 1982, he was home plate umpire for Gaylord Perry's 300th career victory.

Before reaching the major leagues, Kaiser worked as a professional wrestler, wearing a black hood and being known as "The Hatchet Man." In his brief stint as a professional wrestler, he wrestled such famous opponents as Haystacks Calhoun.

In 1986, Kaiser was voted the Most Colorful Umpire in the American League in a poll by The Sporting News. Players in 1998 and 1999, when polled anonymously, voted Kaiser among the worst AL umpires. In 1999, he was among the 68 umpires who submitted their resignations en masse, in an unsuccessful attempt by the Major League Umpires Association to force a new labor agreement; Kaiser was one of 13 who were not re-hired after union negotiations and litigation.

=== Weight ===
During a period in which many umpires were criticized for their weights, Kaiser was the heaviest in the AL. Kaiser wrote in his 2003 autobiography that he weighed 260 pounds (120 kg) in high school. The AL listed his weight at 220 pounds (100 kg) from 1977 to 1979 and at 200 pounds (91 kg) from 1980 to 1982 before revising the figure to 288 pounds (131 kg) in 1983. Kaiser stayed at this weight for two more years, before dropping to 270 pounds (120 kg) in his final season. In a June 2004 column for ESPN's MLB Insider, pitcher Tom Candiotti recalled that Kaiser "wouldn't move three steps to call a play."

== Later years ==
Kaiser's 2003 autobiography, written with the help of author David Fisher, is entitled Planet of the Umps: A Baseball Life From Behind the Plate. Kaiser died from complications of diabetes almost two weeks after his 72nd birthday.

== See also ==
- List of Major League Baseball umpires (disambiguation)
