= Country Joe =

Country Joe may refer to:

- Country Joe McDonald (1942–2026), American musician
- Joe West (umpire) (born 1952), American baseball umpire
