= 2002 American League Division Series =

Teams
Team (Wins)		Manager	Season
Anaheim Angels (3)		Mike Scioscia	99–63 (.611), GB: 4
New York Yankees (1)		Joe Torre	103–58 (.640), GA: 10 1/2
- Dates: October 1–5
- Television: Fox (Games 1–2, 4); ABC Family (Game 3)
- TV announcers: Joe Buck and Tim McCarver (Games 1–2); Jon Miller and Joe Morgan (Game 3); Thom Brennaman and Tim McCarver (Game 4)
- Radio: ESPN
- Radio announcers: Dan Shulman and Dave Campbell
- Umpires: Games 1–2: Jerry Crawford, Doug Eddings, Jim Joyce, Mike Winters, Tim McClelland, Fieldin Culbreth; Games 3–4: Gerry Davis, Chuck Meriwether, Alfonso Márquez, Derryl Cousins, Joe West, Laz Díaz

Teams
Team (Wins)		Manager	Season
Minnesota Twins (3)		Ron Gardenhire	94–67 (.584), GA: 13 1/2
Oakland Athletics (2)		Art Howe	103–59 (.636), GA: 4
- Dates: October 1–6
- Television: ABC Family
- TV announcers: Jon Miller and Joe Morgan (Games 1–2, 5); Dave O'Brien, Tony Gwynn, and Rick Sutcliffe (Games 3–4)
- Radio: ESPN
- Radio announcers: John Rooney and Buck Martinez
- Umpires: Games 1–2 & 5: Gerry Davis, Chuck Meriwether, Alfonso Márquez, Derryl Cousins, Joe West, Laz Díaz; Games 3–4: Jerry Crawford, Doug Eddings, Jim Joyce, Mike Winters, Tim McClelland, Fieldin Culbreth

The 2002 American League Division Series (ALDS) consisted of two best-of-five playoff series on the American League side in Major League Baseball’s (MLB) 2002 postseason, began on Tuesday, October 1, and ended on Sunday, October 6, with the champions of the three AL divisions—along with a "wild card" team—participating in two series. The teams were:

Under MLB's playoff format, no two teams from the same division were matched up in the Division Series, regardless of whether their records would normally indicate such a matchup. Home field advantage went to the team with the better regular-season record with the exception of the wild card team, which defers home field advantage regardless of record. The matchups were:

- (1) New York Yankees (AL East champions) vs. (4) Anaheim Angels (Wild Card qualifier): Angels won the series, 3–1.
- (2) Oakland Athletics (AL West champions) vs. (3) Minnesota Twins (AL Central champions): Twins won the series, 3–2.

The higher seeded team in each series hosts Games 1, 2, and 5 (if necessary), and the lower seeded team hosts Games 3 and 4 (if necessary).

The Angels and Twins both pulled off major upsets and went on to each other meet in the AL Championship Series (ALCS). The Angels became the American League champion, and defeated the National League champion San Francisco Giants in the 2002 World Series, for their first-ever World Series title.

== Matchups ==
=== New York Yankees vs. Anaheim Angels ===
Anaheim won the series, 3–1.

Game	Date	Score	Location	Time	Attendance
1	October 1	Anaheim Angels – 5, New York Yankees – 8	Yankee Stadium (I)	3:27	56,710
2	October 2	Anaheim Angels – 8, New York Yankees – 6	Yankee Stadium (I)	4:11	56,695
3	October 4	New York Yankees – 6, Anaheim Angels – 9	Edison International Field of Anaheim	3:52	45,072
4	October 5	New York Yankees – 5, Anaheim Angels – 9	Edison International Field of Anaheim	3:37	45,067

=== Oakland Athletics vs. Minnesota Twins ===
Minnesota won the series, 3–2.

Game	Date	Score	Location	Time	Attendance
1	October 1	Minnesota Twins – 7, Oakland Athletics – 5	Network Associates Coliseum	3:44	34,853
2	October 2	Minnesota Twins – 1, Oakland Athletics – 9	Network Associates Coliseum	3:04	31,953
3	October 4	Oakland Athletics – 6, Minnesota Twins – 3	Hubert H. Humphrey Metrodome	3:26	55,932
4	October 5	Oakland Athletics – 2, Minnesota Twins – 11	Hubert H. Humphrey Metrodome	3:20	55,960
5	October 6	Minnesota Twins – 5, Oakland Athletics – 4	Network Associates Coliseum	3:23	32,146

== New York vs. Anaheim ==
=== Game 1 ===
October 1, 2002 8:00 pm (EDT) at Yankee Stadium (I) in Bronx, New York 77 °F (25 °C), cloudy
Team	1	2	3	4	5	6	7	8	9	R	H	E
Anaheim	0	0	1	0	2	1	0	1	0	5	12	0
New York	1	0	0	2	1	0	0	4	X	8	8	1
WP: Steve Karsay (1–0) LP: Ben Weber (0–1) Sv: Mariano Rivera (1); Home runs: ANA: Troy Glaus 2 (2); NYY: Derek Jeter (1), Jason Giambi (1), Rondell White (1), Bernie Williams (1); Attendance: 56,710; Boxscore

The Yankees struck first in Game 1 on Derek Jeter's home run in the first off Jarrod Washburn, but in the top of the third, Darin Erstad singled off Roger Clemens. Alfonso Soriano then mishandled Jorge Posada's throw to second on Erstad's stolen base attempt, letting Erstad go to third. Tim Salmon then singled to tie the game. Jason Giambi's two-run home run in the fourth after Jeter drew a leadoff walk put the Yankees up 3–1, but the Angels loaded the bases in the fifth with two outs on two walks and a single before Garret Anderson tied the game with a double to left. The Yankees regained the lead in the bottom of the inning on Rondell White's home run, but the Angels again tied the score on Troy Glaus's home run leading off the sixth. Glaus's second home run of the game in the eighth off Ramiro Mendoza put the Angels up 5–4, but in the bottom of the inning, reliever Ben Weber walked two with two outs, Anaheim manager Mike Scioscia brought in Scott Schoeneweis to pitch to Jason Giambi, who tied the game with an RBI single. Scioscia then brought in Brendan Donnelly to face Bernie Williams who hit a three-run homer to put the Yankees up 8–5. Mariano Rivera pitched a scoreless top of the ninth for the save and give the Yankees a 1–0 series lead.

=== Game 2 ===
October 2, 2002 8:22 pm (EDT) at Yankee Stadium (I) in Bronx, New York 83 °F (28 °C), cloudy
Team	1	2	3	4	5	6	7	8	9	R	H	E
Anaheim	1	2	1	0	0	0	0	3	1	8	17	1
New York	0	0	1	2	0	2	0	0	1	6	12	1
WP: Francisco Rodríguez (1–0) LP: Orlando Hernández (0–1) Sv: Troy Percival (1); Home runs: ANA: Tim Salmon (1), Scott Spiezio (1), Garret Anderson (1), Troy Glaus (3); NYY: Derek Jeter (2), Alfonso Soriano (1); Attendance: 56,695; Boxscore

The Angels struck first in Game 2 on Tim Salmon's two-out home run in the first off Andy Pettitte. Next inning, Scott Spiezio homered with one out off Pettitte, who then allowed three consecutive singles, the last of which Benji Gil scored Shawn Wooten. Next inning, Garret Anderson singled with one out, moved to second on a sacrifice fly, and scored on Spiezio's single. Derek Jeter's home run in the bottom of the inning off Kevin Appier put the Yankees on the board. Next inning, Juan Rivera's two-out two-run single cut the Angels lead to 4–3. In the sixth, Alfonso Soriano's two-run home run off Francisco Rodriguez put the Yankees up 5–4, but back-to-back home runs by Anderson and Troy Glaus leading off the eighth off Orlando Hernandez put the Angels up 6–5. Steve Karsay relieved Hernandez and allowed two one-out singles to put runners on first and third. Adam Kennedy's sacrifice fly off Mike Stanton put the Angels up 7–5. In the ninth, Jeff Weaver allowed two one-out singles before Spiezio's double put the Angels up 8–5. In the bottom of the inning, Troy Percival allowed three singles, the last of which to Jorge Posada scoring Jason Giambi, but earned the save as the Angels tied the series 1–1 going to Anaheim.

=== Game 3 ===
October 4, 2002 5:30 pm (PDT) at Edison International Field in Anaheim, California 78 °F (26 °C), sunny
Team	1	2	3	4	5	6	7	8	9	R	H	E
New York	3	0	3	0	0	0	0	0	0	6	6	0
Anaheim	0	1	2	1	0	1	1	3	X	9	12	0
WP: Francisco Rodríguez (2–0) LP: Mike Stanton (0–1) Sv: Troy Percival (2); Home runs: NYY: None; ANA: Adam Kennedy (1), Tim Salmon (2); Attendance: 45,072; Boxscore

The Yankees loaded the bases in the first off Ramon Ortiz on a single and two walks before Robin Ventura's double scored two and Jorge Posada's sacrifice fly scored another. The Angels got on the board in the second off Mike Mussina when Troy Glaus singled, moved to third on a double and scored on Scott Spiezio's groundout. Ortiz in the third allowed a leadoff walk and subsequent double before Ventura's sacrifice fly put the Yankees up 4–1. After walking Raul Mondesi with two outs, Ortiz was relieved by John Lackey, who allowed consecutive RBI singles to Nick Johnson and Juan Rivera. The Angels cut the Yankees' lead to 6–3 in the bottom of the inning on Tim Salmon's two-run double after David Eckstein and Darin Erstad singled. Next inning, Adam Kennedy's home run cut the lead to 6–4. In the sixth, Jeff Weaver allowed a leadoff single, subsequent walk, and sacrifice bunt before Kennedy's sacrifice fly made it 6–5 Yankees. Next inning, Spiezio's two-out single with runners on first and second off Mike Stanton tied the game. Next inning, Kennedy hit a leadoff double and scored on Erstad's one-out double. Steve Karsay relieved Stanton and allowed a home run to Salmon to put the Angels up 9–6. Troy Percival retired the Yankees in order in the ninth as the Angels took a 2–1 series lead.

=== Game 4 ===
October 5, 2002 1:00 pm (PDT) at Edison International Field in Anaheim, California 81 °F (27 °C), sunny
Team	1	2	3	4	5	6	7	8	9	R	H	E
New York	0	1	0	0	1	1	1	0	1	5	12	2
Anaheim	0	0	1	0	8	0	0	0	X	9	15	1
WP: Jarrod Washburn (1–0) LP: David Wells (0–1); Home runs: NYY: Jorge Posada (1); ANA: Shawn Wooten (1); Attendance: 45,067; Boxscore

With New York facing elimination, they sent David Wells to the mound. They struck first in the second off Jarrod Washburn on Robin Ventura's RBI double with runners on first and third, but the Angels tied the game in the second when Shawn Wooten scored from third on an error on David Eckstein's ground ball. The Yankees regained the lead in the fifth when Juan Rivera reached first on Third Basemen Troy Glaus's throwing error, moved to second on a double, and scored on Derek Jeter's sacrifice fly, but the Angels exploded for eight runs in the bottom of the inning. Shawn Wooten's lead-off home run tied the game, then Anaheim hit five consecutive singles with one out, the last three scoring a run each, to chase Wells. Ramiro Mendoza relieved Wells and allowed an RBI single to Wooten and a two-run double to Bengie Molina. Jorge Posada's lead-off home run in the sixth off Brendan Donnelly made it 9–3 Angels. Next inning, the Yankees loaded the bases with one out off Francisco Rodriguez but scored just once on a wild pitch. In the ninth, the Yankees hit three consecutive two-out singles, the last of which to Raul Mondesi scoring Bernie Williams before Nick Johnson popped out to end the game and series. Anaheim's victory secured their place in the American League Championship Series as their first ever postseason series win. It also ended the Yankees' bid for a fifth consecutive World Series appearance as their first loss in a Division Series since 1997.

=== Composite box ===
2002 ALDS (3–1): Anaheim Angels over New York Yankees

Team	1	2	3	4	5	6	7	8	9	R	H	E
Anaheim Angels	1	3	5	1	10	2	1	7	1	31	56	2
New York Yankees	4	1	4	4	2	3	1	4	2	25	38	4
Total attendance: 203,544 Average attendance: 50,886

== Oakland vs. Minnesota ==
=== Game 1 ===
October 1, 2002 1:00 pm (PDT) at Network Associates Coliseum in Oakland, California 68 °F (20 °C), sunny
Team	1	2	3	4	5	6	7	8	9	R	H	E
Minnesota	0	1	2	0	0	3	1	0	0	7	13	3
Oakland	3	2	0	0	0	0	0	0	0	5	12	0
WP: Brad Radke (1–0) LP: Ted Lilly (0–1) Sv: Eddie Guardado (1); Home runs: MIN: Corey Koskie (1), Doug Mientkiewicz (1); OAK: None; Attendance: 34,853; Boxscore

The A's struck first in the bottom of the first off Brad Radke when with runners on first and second on a walk and fielder's choice error, Eric Chavez drove in both with a single right. Chavez reached second on another error, then scored on David Justice's two-out single, all three runs unearned. The Twins cut the lead to 3–1 when Torii Hunter doubled to lead off the second off Tim Hudson and scored on Michael Cuddyer's one-out double. In the bottom of the inning, Ray Durham doubled with two outs, then scored on Scott Hatteberg's single. After another Twins error put runners on first and third, Chavez's single scored Hatteberg. In the third, the Twins cut the A's lead to 5–3 on Corey Koskie's two-run home run. Doug Mientkiewicz's leadoff home run in the sixth cut it to 5–4 A's. After Cuddyer grounded out, Ted Lilly relieved Hudson and allowed back-to-back singles to A. J. Pierzynski and Luis Rivas. Jacque Jones's RBI double then tied the game and after a walk, Koskie's RBI groundout put the Twins up 6–5. They added insurance in the seventh when Cuddyer singled with two outs off Cory Lidle and scored on Pierzynki's triple. The Minnesota bullpen pitched four innings of shutout ball to escape with a stunning 7–5 victory over the Athletics.

=== Game 2 ===
October 2, 2002 1:00 pm (PDT) at Network Associates Coliseum in Oakland, California 73 °F (23 °C), sunny
Team	1	2	3	4	5	6	7	8	9	R	H	E
Minnesota	0	0	0	0	0	1	0	0	0	1	7	1
Oakland	3	0	0	5	1	0	0	0	X	9	14	0
WP: Mark Mulder (1–0) LP: Joe Mays (0–1); Home runs: MIN: Cristian Guzmán (1); OAK: Eric Chavez (1); Attendance: 31,953; Boxscore

Oakland dominated Twin starter Joe Mays from the get-go and never looked back. Third baseman Eric Chavez hit a three-run home run in the first inning, and the A's added five more runs in the fourth. Ray Durham was hit by a pitch with one out, then scored on Miguel Tejada's two-out double. After Chavez was intentionally walked, Mays was pulled from the game after 3 1/3 innings. After Tony Fiore walked Jermaine Dye to load the bases, David Justice cleared them with a triple before Justice scored on Mark Ellis's double. The A's added another run in the fifth when Durham doubled with one out, moved to third on a wild pitch, and scored on Scott Hatteberg's single. The Twins' lone run came on a Cristian Guzmán home run in the sixth inning as the series was tied 1–1 heading to Minnesota.

=== Game 3 ===
October 4, 2002 1:00 pm (CDT) at Hubert H. Humphrey Metrodome in Minneapolis, Minnesota 72 °F (22 °C), dome
Team	1	2	3	4	5	6	7	8	9	R	H	E
Oakland	2	0	0	1	0	1	2	0	0	6	9	1
Minnesota	0	0	0	1	2	0	0	0	0	3	8	0
WP: Barry Zito (1–0) LP: Rick Reed (0–1) Sv: Billy Koch (1); Home runs: OAK: Ray Durham (1), Scott Hatteberg (1), Terrence Long (1), Jermaine Dye (1); MIN: None; Attendance: 55,932; Boxscore

Ray Durham stunned the Twin fans inside the Metrodome by leading off the game with an inside-the-park home run off Rick Reed, the first in Division Series history. Scott Hatteberg hit a home run to right field moments later to stake 23-game winner Barry Zito to a 2–0 lead. Terrence Long's home run in the fourth made it 3–0 A's. The Twins cut it to 3–1 on A. J. Pierzynski's RBI single with runners on first and third. Next inning, Jacque Jones drew a leadoff walk, then scored on Corey Koskie's one-out double. One out later, Koskie scored on Torii Hunter's single to tie the game, but in the sixth, Jermaine Dye's leadoff home run put the A's up 4–3 off Reed. Next inning, Johan Santana walked Durham with one out and Randy Velarde's pinch-hit double made it 5–3 A's. Verlade moved to third on the throw to home. Michael Jackson replaced Santana and allowed a sacrifice fly to Miguel Tejada to make it 6–3 A's. This was just the second postseason loss at the HHH Metrodome for the Twins (11–1 home record coming into the game), the last coming in 1991 to Toronto in the ALCS.

=== Game 4 ===
October 5, 2002 1:00 pm (CDT) at Hubert H. Humphrey Metrodome in Minneapolis, Minnesota 72 °F (22 °C), dome
Team	1	2	3	4	5	6	7	8	9	R	H	E
Oakland	0	0	2	0	0	0	0	0	0	2	7	2
Minnesota	0	0	2	7	0	0	2	0	X	11	12	0
WP: Eric Milton (1–0) LP: Tim Hudson (0–1); Home runs: OAK: Miguel Tejada (1); MIN: Doug Mientkiewicz (2); Attendance: 55,960; Boxscore

The A's struck first on Miguel Tejada's two-run home run after a two-out walk off Eric Milton in the third, but in the bottom of the inning, the Twins tied the score on Cristian Guzman's RBI groundout with runners on second and third followed by David Ortiz's RBI double off Tim Hudson. Next inning, an error on Luis Rivas's ground ball with runners on first and second scored a run and put runners on second and third. A wild pitch scored another run before Jacque Jones was hit by a pitch. Another A's error on Cristian Guzman's ground ball scored another run and put runners on first and third. Ted Lilly in relief allowed an RBI single to Corey Koskie. After David Ortiz struck out, a wild pitch to Torii Hunter scored another run before Hunter's double and Doug Mientkiewicz's single scored a run each, all seven runs scored in this inning unearned. Mientkiewicz's two-run home run in the seventh after a lead off single off Lilly made it 11–2 Twins. and that was all starter Eric Milton needed, forcing a decisive Game 5 in Oakland.

=== Game 5 ===
October 6, 2002 1:00 pm (PDT) at Network Associates Coliseum in Oakland, California 76 °F (24 °C), sunny
Team	1	2	3	4	5	6	7	8	9	R	H	E
Minnesota	0	1	1	0	0	0	0	0	3	5	12	0
Oakland	0	0	1	0	0	0	0	0	3	4	11	0
WP: Brad Radke (2–0) LP: Mark Mulder (1–1); Home runs: MIN: A. J. Pierzynski (1); OAK: Ray Durham (2), Mark Ellis (1); Attendance: 32,146; Boxscore

The Twins struck first in the second off Mark Mulder on Denny Hocking's based loaded two-out single. Next inning, Cristian Guzman hit a lead off double, then scored on Matt LeCroy's one-out single. Ray Durham's home run in the bottom of the inning off Brad Radke made it 2–1 Twins, which stayed that way until the ninth, when Dustan Mohr drew a leadoff walk off Billy Koch, then a home run from A. J. Pierzynski made it 4–1 Twins. Two outs later, Corey Koskie' singled, moved to second on a walk, and scored on an RBI double from David Ortiz. Oakland cut the lead to 5–4 off Twin closer Eddie Guardado in the bottom of the inning on Mark Ellis's three-run home run to left. Randy Velarde singled with two outs to represent the tying run when Ray Durham fouled out to second to end the series.

Minnesota's victory secured its place in the American League Championship Series. This was the Twins' most recent playoff series win until 2023.

This marked the third straight year Oakland was eliminated in the Division Series, and all by virtue of losing Game 5.

=== Composite box ===
2002 ALDS (3–2): Minnesota Twins over Oakland Athletics

Team	1	2	3	4	5	6	7	8	9	R	H	E
Minnesota Twins	0	2	5	8	2	4	3	0	3	27	52	4
Oakland Athletics	8	2	3	6	1	1	2	0	3	26	53	3
Total attendance: 210,844 Average attendance: 42,169
