= Dale Ford =

American baseball umpire and politician (born 1942)

Member of the Tennessee House of Representatives from the 6th district
- In office 2006–2012
- Preceded by: David Davis
- Succeeded by: Micah Van Huss

Personal details
- Born: July 6, 1942 (age 84) Jonesborough, Tennessee, U.S.
- Party: Republican
- Spouse: Joyce
- Children: 5

Military service
- Branch/service: US Army
- Years of service: 1959–1968
- Baseball career
- Umpire

MLB debut
- 1974

Last appearance
- 1999

Career highlights and awards
- Special assignments: World Series (1986, 1997); League Championship Series (1979, 1985, 1989, 1995); Division Series (1981, 1997); All-Star Games (1988, 1999)

Member of the TSSAA

Baseball Hall of Fame
- Induction: 2023

Robert Dale Ford (born July 6, 1942 in Jonesborough, Tennessee) is an American politician and former baseball umpire. He was a member of the Tennessee House of Representatives, representing the 6th district from 2006 to 2012. He was a member of the Agriculture and Transportation Committees. Ford was an umpire in Major League Baseball from 1974 to 1999.

== Umpiring career ==
Ford was an umpire in the American League from 1974 until 1999 (wearing uniform number 20 when the AL adopted them in 1980) when he, along with several other umpires, was not retained by Major League Baseball following the 1999 Major League Umpires Association mass resignation. After having a long umpiring career, Ford decided he was ready to retire. He was granted retirement status in 2001.

He was well known for being behind the plate for Game 6 of the 1986 World Series for Bill Buckner's error; for being behind the plate during a 1993 game between the Chicago White Sox and Texas Rangers where Robin Ventura charged the mound after being hit by a Nolan Ryan pitch, provoking a bench-clearing brawl in which Ryan repeatedly punched Ventura; for ejecting Baltimore Orioles manager Earl Weaver from a game during the national anthem; and for ejecting Reggie Jackson from a game only to have Jackson begin throwing all the contents of the dugout onto the playing field. During his career, he was rated between first and twenty-fifth. Ford said "When umpires are rated low, you know they haven't kissed up to anyone." When looking back on his MLB service, Rep. Ford says, "For an old country boy with no particular brains and definitely not good looking, I felt like that was OK."

Umpire union leader and Philadelphia attorney Richie Phillips brought a lawsuit against New York Yankees manager Billy Martin when Martin stated that Ford was a "stone liar, someone I'll bet $100 doesn't know how to read." Ford later sued the Texas Rangers after he fell while leaving Arlington Stadium. Ford also sued Major League Baseball for retirement pay and interest; he was one of the umpires who were not rehired in the wake of the union's failed 1999 resignation strategy.

In 2012, he was umpiring in the Appalachian League, a rookie-level league in the minor league system.

== Political career ==
In 2002, Ford ran in the Republican primary for Tennessee State Representative District 6 against an incumbent, David Davis. Davis edged Ford by a margin of 3,783-3,524. Following his defeat, Ford said, "I really don't have a desire in pursuing it again. The way the political system is in this country, it's hard to get anything done."

In 2006, after Davis announced he would not run again but would instead seek the US House District 1 seat for Tennessee, Ford again ran for State Representative. This time he ran against Joshua Arrowood, Ethan Flynn, Patti Jarrett, Michael Malone, and Lee Sowers in the Republican primary. There was no opposition in the 2006 general election.

In the 2012 GOP Primary, he was unseated by state Rep. Micah Van Huss, R-Jonesborough.

In 2020, he unsuccessfully challenged incumbent Scott Buckingham for Washington County, Tennessee assessor of property in the GOP primary race. Ford lost by 138 votes, gathering 5,006 vs. 5,144 for the incumbent.

== Political philosophy ==
He is pro-life. Fiscally, he says that he is interested in increasing the state budget tremendously for education, emergency preparedness, law enforcement, health care, and welfare. He is also for increasing taxes on alcohol and tobacco. He also seeks a tax on internet sales. He supports the limits of contributions that can be given to candidates, though many claim that this goes against 1st Amendment rights and is a protection for incumbents. He hopes to end “working the polls” by candidates and their workers. He supports increased pensions for law enforcement officers. He is a supporter of hate-crime laws. He is for nationalized education and against school choice. He supports minimum wage increases. He supports strong gun laws.

Rep. Ford has worked closely with Tennessee's governor, Governor Phil Bredesen. He has worked on water and road issues. He works closely with the elderly and with veterans.

He received an 'A' rating from the NRA, despite his support for strong gun control laws He also signed the Americans for Tax Reform Pledge to 'oppose and vote against all efforts to increase taxes'; however, he supports increasing the state budget and increasing taxes on alcohol, tobacco, and internet sales. He voted in committee to increase taxes on cigarettes (which is a disregard of his pledge against all tax increases).

== Personal life ==
He lives in Jonesborough with his wife Joyce. He has 5 children, Brian, David, Susan, Donna & Andy. He is an Army veteran. He is a member of the New Hope Church.
