= 1997 National League Championship Series =

Team (Wins)	Managers	Season
Florida Marlins (4)	Jim Leyland	92–70 (.568), GB: 9
Atlanta Braves (2)	Bobby Cox	101–61 (.623), GA: 9
- Dates: October 7–14
- MVP: Liván Hernández (Florida)
- Umpires: Bruce Froemming, Charlie Williams, Mike Winters, Jerry Layne, Eric Gregg, Frank Pulli

Broadcast
- Television: NBC (United States); MLB International (International)
- TV announcers: Bob Costas, Joe Morgan, and Bob Uecker (NBC); Gary Thorne and Ken Singleton (MLB International)
- Radio: CBS
- Radio announcers: Gary Cohen and Jerry Coleman
- NLDS: Florida Marlins over San Francisco Giants (3–0); Atlanta Braves over Houston Astros (3–0)

The 1997 National League Championship Series (NLCS) was a best-of-seven playoff series in Major League Baseball’s 1997 postseason pitting the NL East champion and two-time defending National League champion Atlanta Braves against the wild card Florida Marlins for the National League pennant. The Series began on October 7 and ended on October 14. The Braves held home-field advantage by virtue of winning their division.

The Marlins won the series, 4–2, and went on to defeat the Cleveland Indians in the 1997 World Series.

== Background ==
Both teams hailed from the NL East division, the 101-win Braves being the division champions while the Marlins made the playoffs courtesy of the wild card. Both the Braves and Marlins swept their opponents during the Division Series. This was the second all-Southern postseason series, the first being in the previous round when Atlanta beat the Houston Astros. However, it was the first all-Southern postseason series to take place entirely in one time zone.

This series marked the high point for the Braves-Marlins rivalry, as the Marlins made the playoffs only once from 1998 to 2019 (2003, which also ended with a World Series title). However, both franchises would eventually meet in the postseason again in the 2020 National League Division Series.

== Summary ==
=== Atlanta Braves vs. Florida Marlins ===
Florida won the series, 4–2.

Game	Date	Score	Location	Time	Attendance
1	October 7	Florida Marlins – 5, Atlanta Braves – 3	Turner Field	3:04	49,244
2	October 8	Florida Marlins – 1, Atlanta Braves – 7	Turner Field	2:51	48,933
3	October 10	Atlanta Braves – 2, Florida Marlins – 5	Pro Player Stadium	2:59	53,857
4	October 11	Atlanta Braves – 4, Florida Marlins – 0	Pro Player Stadium	2:48	54,890
5	October 12	Atlanta Braves – 1, Florida Marlins – 2	Pro Player Stadium	2:27	51,982
6	October 14	Florida Marlins – 7, Atlanta Braves – 4	Turner Field	3:10	50,446

== Game summaries ==
=== Game 1 ===
October 7, 1997 8:09 pm (EDT) at Turner Field in Atlanta, Georgia 76 °F (24 °C), clear
Team	1	2	3	4	5	6	7	8	9	R	H	E
Florida	3	0	2	0	0	0	0	0	0	5	6	0
Atlanta	1	0	1	0	0	1	0	0	0	3	5	2
WP: Kevin Brown (1–0) LP: Greg Maddux (0–1) Sv: Robb Nen (1); Home runs: FLA: None; ATL: Chipper Jones (1), Ryan Klesko (1); Attendance: 49,244; Boxscore

The Marlins scored three unearned runs in the first inning off Greg Maddux when Fred McGriff's error on Jeff Conine's ground ball loaded the bases with two outs, then Moisés Alou hit a bases-clearing groundball double past Chipper Jones's glove (who made a weak attempt backhanding the ball). Atlanta got a run back in the bottom of the inning off Florida starter Kevin Brown with Keith Lockhart doubled with one out and scored on McGriff's single, but in the third, an error by center fielder Kenny Lofton on Gary Sheffield's fly ball allowed him to reach third, then after a walk, Alou's groundout and Charles Johnson's doubled scored a run each to put the Marlins ahead 5–1. All five runs they scored in this game were unearned. Home runs by Chipper Jones in the third and Ryan Klesko in the sixth drew Atlanta to 5–3, but the Florida bullpen held the Braves hitless over the final three innings. Brown, who went six innings, got the win.

=== Game 2 ===
October 8, 1997 4:06 pm (EDT) at Turner Field in Atlanta, Georgia 85 °F (29 °C), sunny
Team	1	2	3	4	5	6	7	8	9	R	H	E
Florida	0	0	0	0	0	0	0	1	0	1	3	1
Atlanta	3	0	2	0	0	0	2	0	X	7	13	0
WP: Tom Glavine (1–0) LP: Alex Fernandez (0–1); Home runs: FLA: None; ATL: Ryan Klesko (2), Chipper Jones (2); Attendance: 48,933; Boxscore

The Braves rallied from their sloppy Game 1 and routed pitcher Alex Fernandez, chasing him after 2 2/3 innings. In the first, Kenny Lofton hit a leadoff single, then scored on Keith Lockhart's triple. After two strikeouts, Ryan Klesko's home run made it 3–0. A third inning two-run homer by Chipper Jones helped Atlanta build a 5–0 lead. In the bottom of the seventh, Tony Graffanino hit a leadoff double, then scored on Jones' single. Two walks loaded the bases before Javy Lopez's sacrifice fly made it 7–0 Braves. Starter Tom Glavine was excellent, giving up just one run (in the eighth when Charles Johnson walked with one out and scored on Devon White's double) in 7 2/3 innings. It was learned after the game that Fernandez had been unknowingly pitching with a rotator cuff injury, and would be done for the series, which was tied 1–1 heading to Florida.

=== Game 3 ===
October 10, 1997 8:11 pm (EDT) at Pro Player Stadium in Miami Gardens, Florida 77 °F (25 °C), windy, showers
Team	1	2	3	4	5	6	7	8	9	R	H	E
Atlanta	0	0	0	1	0	1	0	0	0	2	6	1
Florida	0	0	0	1	0	4	0	0	X	5	8	1
WP: Liván Hernández (1–0) LP: John Smoltz (0–1) Sv: Robb Nen (2); Home runs: ATL: None; FLA: Gary Sheffield (1); Attendance: 53,857; Boxscore

With the series shifting south to Miami, Game 3 began as a close game. In the top of the fourth inning the Braves loaded the bases with nobody out on a single, walk and error off of Tony Saunders, but could only score one run on Fred McGriff's sacrifice fly that scored Kenny Lofton. Gary Sheffield responded with a home run in the bottom of the fourth off of John Smoltz. This was the only home run the Marlins hit in the series. In the sixth, the Braves put runners on first and third with one out off of Saunders before Javy López hit a sacrifice fly off of Livan Hernandez, which scored Jeff Blauser. However, the Marlins pulled away in the bottom half of the sixth, when they scored four runs to finish John Smoltz's night. With two on, two out, and a 1-2 count, Darren Daulton hit a clutch, game-tying double, scoring Édgar Rentería. After an intentional walk loaded the bases, light-hitting catcher Charles Johnson smacked a 2–2 pitch to left-center, clearing the bases and giving the Marlins a 5–2 lead. Hernández got the win as the Marlins took a 2–1 series lead. This was Smoltz's only post-season loss in his career in which he did not turn in a quality start. His other three were hard luck losses, including two in which he surrendered only unearned runs.

=== Game 4 ===
October 11, 1997 7:37 pm (EDT) at Pro Player Stadium in Miami Gardens, Florida 81 °F (27 °C), windy, showers
Team	1	2	3	4	5	6	7	8	9	R	H	E
Atlanta	1	0	1	0	2	0	0	0	0	4	11	0
Florida	0	0	0	0	0	0	0	0	0	0	4	0
WP: Denny Neagle (1–0) LP: Al Leiter (0–1); Home runs: ATL: Jeff Blauser (1); FLA: None; Attendance: 54,890; Boxscore

Denny Neagle stepped up and pitched a complete game, four-hit shutout of the Marlins in Game 4. The Braves offense, meanwhile, chipped away at Al Leiter. Fred McGriff followed a walk and single with an RBI single in the first, then after a double and walk in the third, Andruw Jones's RBI single made it 2–0 Braves. Jeff Blauser led off the fifth with a home run, then Chipper Jones singled and scored on Fred McGriff's double, putting the Braves on top 4–0. The win evened the series at 2–2, and with Greg Maddux and Tom Glavine scheduled to start Games 5 and 6 and the Florida pitching staff in apparent disarray, the advantage clearly fell with the Braves.

=== Game 5 ===
October 12, 1997 4:12 pm (EDT) at Pro Player Stadium in Miami Gardens, Florida 86 °F (30 °C), windy, cloudy
Team	1	2	3	4	5	6	7	8	9	R	H	E
Atlanta	0	1	0	0	0	0	0	0	0	1	3	0
Florida	1	0	0	0	0	0	1	0	X	2	5	0
WP: Liván Hernández (2–0) LP: Greg Maddux (0–2); Home runs: ATL: Michael Tucker (1); FLA: None; Attendance: 51,982; Boxscore

After Neagle's gem in Game 4, Game 5 was clearly the pivotal game of the series. If the Marlins lost, the Braves would be up three games to two and going home with an almost certain NL pennant in sight. Liván Hernández replaced Kevin Brown, who had fallen ill that day. The Braves threatened immediately in the first inning, with Kenny Lofton hitting a triple and Keith Lockhart being walked, putting runners on the corners with no outs. However, Livan regrouped and struck out the heart of the order. Florida scored a run in the bottom of the inning off Greg Maddux when Devon White was hit by a pitch. It was noted that he appeared to make no effort to get out of the way of the pitch, though this is rarely called against a player even though the rules state that a player can be called out for this. White subsequently stole second and after a walk, scored on Bobby Bonilla's single. The Braves evened the game with a Michael Tucker home run in the second. The score remained tied at 1–1 as Maddux and Hernández traded scoreless innings. In the bottom of the seventh, Bobby Bonilla doubled and scored on a single by Jeff Conine to give the Marlins a 2–1 lead. Hernández continued to shut down a befuddled Braves offense. The Braves had a chance for a potential two-out rally in the eighth with Lofton reaching on a walk, but was thrown out trying to steal second base. The game ended with Hernandez striking out Fred McGriff on a called third strike, on a 3–2 pitch that appeared to be at least a foot off the plate. Hernández pitched a complete game, three-hit, 15 strikeout masterpiece to reclaim a series lead for the Marlins. The Braves three, four, five hitters went 1–11 with seven strikeouts.

This particular game is remembered for the controversy surrounding an unusually wide strike zone given to Hernández, by umpire Eric Gregg. While Gregg was long known to have a wide strike zone, this game took it to the extreme even for him, and the strike zone seemed to expand as the game went on. Furthermore, the strike zone seemed to be wider off the plate to left-handed hitters than it was to right-handed hitters, and while this was consistently the case with both teams, it disproportionately affected the Braves because they had six left-handers in their lineup to the Marlins' three. It was voted as the third-worst called game from 1975 to 2000 by Baseball America.

Liván Hernández set a record for most strikeouts in a National League Championship Series game with 15; just a day earlier Mike Mussina of the Baltimore Orioles had struck out 15 in the American League Championship Series against the Indians in Game 3. By contrast, the game left Maddux with an 0–2 record in the series despite an ERA of 1.38.

=== Game 6 ===
October 14, 1997 8:07 pm (EDT) at Turner Field in Atlanta, Georgia 61 °F (16 °C), clear
Team	1	2	3	4	5	6	7	8	9	R	H	E
Florida	4	0	0	0	0	3	0	0	0	7	10	1
Atlanta	1	2	0	0	0	0	0	0	1	4	11	1
WP: Kevin Brown (2–0) LP: Tom Glavine (1–1); Attendance: 50,446; Boxscore

Back at Turner Field with a World Series appearance looming, the Marlins went back to their ace, Kevin Brown. Facing Tom Glavine, Devon White singled, Edgar Rentería walked, and Gary Sheffield singled to load the bases with no outs. Bobby Bonilla then smacked a two-run single. After a Jeff Conine sacrifice bunt and Moises Alou intentional walk, Glavine beaned Charles Johnson, scoring Sheffield, making it 3–0. Craig Counsell then grounded out, scoring Bonilla, making it 4–0 Marlins.

The Braves struck back in the bottom half with Ryan Klesko singling home Keith Lockhart (baseball). The Braves closed to within one run in the second inning. Jeff Blauser singled with one out, moved to second on a sacrifice bunt, then scored on a Kenny Lofton single. After Lofton stole second and moved to third on catcher Johnson's throwing error, Lockhart singled him home, making the score 4–3. However, Glavine could not quell the Marlins in the sixth. Once again, White, Rentería, and Sheffield reached base with no outs. Bonilla singled making it 5–3. After a Conine strikeout, Alou grounded into a force play, scoring Rentería. Johnson then walked intentionally before Counsell singled, making it 7–3 Marlins. Brown was asked to leave the game towards the ninth, but he told Jim Leyland he wanted to continue. The Braves were able to score one in the ninth on Lockhart's single with two on, bringing Chipper Jones, who finished ninth in MVP voting, to the plate representing the tying run. However, he hit a grounder and the Marlins forced Keith Lockhart at second to give Brown a complete game victory and the first pennant for the Florida Marlins. It was the first pennant for a wild card team in Major League Baseball history. Furthermore, Glavine suffered his ninth career postseason loss, surpassing Whitey Ford and Jerry Reuss for the most ever.

== Composite box ==
1997 NLCS (4–2): Florida Marlins over Atlanta Braves

Team	1	2	3	4	5	6	7	8	9	R	H	E
Florida Marlins	8	0	2	1	0	7	1	1	0	20	36	3
Atlanta Braves	6	3	4	1	2	2	2	0	1	21	49	4
Total attendance: 309,352 Average attendance: 51,559

== Aftermath ==
Liván Hernández, the 1997 National League Championship Series MVP, would eventually find himself pitching for the Braves 15 years later in 2012, though it would only be a short 18 game stint. Hernandez became well traveled throughout his career, having pitched 9 different teams after being traded from the Marlins in 1999. Gary Sheffield would also spend time with the Braves for two seasons in 2002 and 2003. In 2003, he came in third in MVP voting behind Barry Bonds and Albert Pujols.

Game 5 home plate umpire Eric Gregg continued to umpire in 1998 and a portion of the 1999 season, but was not selected for post season duties again. Gregg was one of 22 umpires who resigned in 1999 as part of a labor action. Richie Phillips, executive director of the umpires' union and a very close friend of Gregg's, felt that Major League Baseball might reconsider its stance in contract negotiations rather than doling out millions of dollars in severance pay. Instead, the MLB chose to accept the resignations, though they later rehired several of those who had resigned –– Gregg not being one of them. Gregg suffered stroke on June 4, 2006, and died the next day. He was 55 years old. Considering the ramifications (the series was tied at 2 a piece with a pennant on the line), many publications consider his Game 5 one of the worst called games in Major League Baseball history. MLB did not adopt a system for challenging balls and strikes until the 2026 season.

This series reinforced multiple narratives. On one hand, it showed how unpredictable baseball can be in the postseason, particularly in the Wild Card era, as the Braves lost the series despite being heavy favorites, while also reinforcing the narrative that the Braves left many opportunities of multiple championships on the table during their historic 14-year run of division titles. Although the Marlins had never won the NL East, they won more World Series as a wild card entrant (1997, 2003) than the Braves did as the NL West/NL East division winner, with 1995 being their lone championship during the run.

The Marlins were the first 2nd place team to not win their division, yet beat their own division winner in the postseason. With postseason expansion in 2012, 2020 (due to a global pandemic) and 2022, this became more common. Seven years later, this would be the path for the 2004 Boston Red Sox, defeating the 1st place Yankees, on their way to winning the World Series, ending an 86-year drought and breaking the Curse of the Bambino.

23 years later, the Braves swept the Marlins in the 2020 National League Division Series.
