= Derryl Cousins =

American baseball umpire (1946–2020)

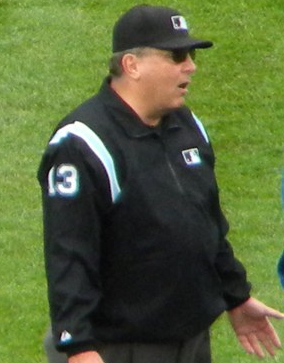
- Cousins in 2009
- Born: August 18, 1946; Fresno, California, U.S.
- Died: October 19, 2020 (aged 74); Palm Springs, California, U.S.
- Occupation: MLB umpire
- Years active: 1979–2012
- Height: 6 ft 0 in (183 cm)

Derryl Cousins (August 18, 1946 – October 19, 2020) was an American umpire in Major League Baseball (MLB), who worked in the American League (AL) from 1979 to 1999, and umpired throughout both leagues from 2000 until his retirement following the 2012 season, ending his career as a crew chief.

Cousins was hired as a replacement umpire during the 1979 Major League umpires strike and was the last replacement umpire from that strike to officiate in the league at the time of his retirement.

== Early life and career ==
Cousins was born in Fresno, California, on August 18, 1946. He graduated from El Segundo High School, and went on to study at El Camino College. He played minor league baseball for several seasons before entering umpiring. He started playing as a catcher with the Statesville Tigers of the Western Carolinas League. He proceeded to play for the Rocky Mount Leafs of the Carolina League in 1968, then with the High Point-Thomasville Hi-Toms. He made a comeback with the Reno Aces of the California League in 1970.

Cousins umpired in the Midwest League, Carolina League, Texas League, Pacific Coast League and Arizona Instructional League before being promoted to MLB during the 1979 umpire strike.

== Umpiring career ==
Cousins umpired in the World Series in 1988, 1999 and 2005. He also officiated in the All-Star Game in 1987, 1998 and 2008, and was behind the plate for the 2008 game at Yankee Stadium, which lasted a record 4 hours 50 minutes before ending in the 15th inning. He worked in seven League Championship Series (1985, 1989, 1995, 2003, 2006, 2008, 2010), and in five Division Series (1997, 1999, 2002, 2005, 2007). Cousins was promoted to crew chief for the 2008 season. He was also crew chief during the semi-finals and finals of the 2009 World Baseball Classic, and served as the home plate umpire in the latter game.

Cousins wore uniform number 13, starting when the AL adopted numbers in 1980. After his retirement, that number was used by Todd Tichenor. Since Cousins was called up to the AL during the 1979 umpires' strike, he was not allowed to join the Major League Umpires Association, the former umpires' union which was headed by Richie Phillips. He was a member of the World Umpires Association, the new collective bargaining union of MLB umpires since 2000. Cousins was the last umpire to wear the American League's red blazer during its tenure in the AL (from 1973 to 1979), and also one of the few officials who wore the AL's red short-sleeved shirt in the mid to late 1990s.

Cousins umpired his 4,000th game on May 3, 2009, when the Seattle Mariners faced the Oakland Athletics. He became the eighteenth MLB umpire to attain that milestone. For the 2008 season, he was promoted to crew chief. His crew for that season included Angel Hernandez, Eric Cooper, and Marty Foster. Cousins subsequently retired at the end of the 2012 season.

=== Notable games ===
- Cousins was the home plate umpire in Tom Seaver's 300th career win in Yankee Stadium on August 4, 1985.
- He served as the third base umpire in Game 1 of the 1988 World Series when Kirk Gibson hit his famous pinch-hit home run.
- On May 12, 2001, Cousins worked as the third base umpire during A. J. Burnett's no-hitter against the San Diego Padres.
- He was the home plate umpire for the game between the San Francisco Giants and the San Diego Padres on August 4, 2007. In the top of the second inning at San Diego, Barry Bonds of the Giants hit his 755th career home run off Clay Hensley, tying Hank Aaron for first all-time.
- He served as the second base umpire in the final game at Yankee Stadium on September 21, 2008.
- Cousins was the first base umpire when Oakland Athletics pitcher Dallas Braden threw the 19th perfect game in MLB history on May 9, 2010.
- He was the third base umpire and crew chief for Armando Galarraga's near-perfect game on June 2, 2010.
- He worked as the third base umpire when Derek Jeter of the New York Yankees attained his 3000th career hit against the Tampa Bay Rays.
- He served as the first base umpire at the final game at Chicago’s Comiskey Park, where the White Sox defeated the Seattle Mariners 2-1 on September 30, 1990.

== Later life and death ==
Cousins was arrested in March 2015 for driving under the influence in downtown Scottsdale, Arizona. He was consequently released on $2,000 bail. He was residing in Las Vegas at the time of the incident.

Cousins died on October 19, 2020, at his home in Palm Springs, California. He was 74, and suffered from cancer in the time leading up to his death.

== See also ==
- List of Major League Baseball umpires (disambiguation)
