= Rich Garcia =

American baseball umpire (born 1942)

- Born: Richard Raul Garcia; May 22, 1942 (age 83); Key West, Florida, U.S.
- Occupation: Former MLB umpire
- Years active: 1975–1999
- Height: 5 ft 9 in (175 cm)

Richard Raul Garcia (born May 22, 1942) is an American former umpire in Major League Baseball (MLB) who worked in the American League (AL) from 1975 to 1999. Garcia wore uniform number 19 when the AL adopted numbers for its umpires in 1980.

== Umpiring career ==
After graduating from his hometown's Key West High School in 1960, Garcia served in the United States Marine Corps as a combat engineer until 1964. Stationed in Okinawa and North Carolina during his tour of duty, he also played on the Marine Corps baseball team for three years.

He completed his training from MLB's Umpire Specialization Course in 1970. He progressed up the minor leagues, starting with the Florida State League in 1970 and 1971, followed by the Southern League in 1972 and the International League in 1973 and 1974. During those five years he worked during the offseason in the Florida Instructional League (1970–1971, 1973–1974) and the Dominican Winter Baseball League (1972–1973).

Garcia was hired by the American League in 1975, working at third base in his major league debut in the Minnesota Twins' season-opening 11–4 victory over the Texas Rangers at Arlington Stadium on April 8. His first assignment behind the plate was the Rangers' 7–5 loss to the defending World Series Champion Oakland Athletics in the same ballpark three nights later on April 11.

Garcia was promoted to AL crew chief in 1985.

Garcia worked two All-Star Games (1980, 1992), three American League Division Series (1995, 1997, 1998), five American League Championship Series (1978, 1982, 1986, 1990, 1996) and four World Series (1981, 1984, 1989, 1998). He was crew chief for the 1989 and 1998 World Series, as well as the 1990 ALCS.

Garcia is one of seven major leagues umpires who have officiated in two perfect games. He was behind the plate when Len Barker did it in the Cleveland Indians' 3–0 victory over the Toronto Blue Jays on May 15, 1981. Garcia was umpiring at second base for the one David Wells pitched in the New York Yankees' 4–0 win over the Minnesota Twins on May 17, 1998. Garcia also served as the home plate umpire for the inaugural game of the Tampa Bay Devil Rays on March 31, 1998.

== Controversies ==
In 1996, Garcia made an incorrect call during Game 1 of the American League Championship Series between the Baltimore Orioles and the Yankees. In the 8th inning, the Yankees tied the game 4–4 when Derek Jeter hit a fly ball to right field that 12-year-old fan Jeffrey Maier pulled into the stands after reaching over the right field wall. Garcia, who was umpiring in right field, ruled it a home run, but after seeing a replay admitted that he had made a mistake after the game; the Yankees won the game in 11 innings and would go on to win the series.

Another call by Garcia that was questioned by some media members came in Game 1 of the 1998 World Series. Padres pitcher Mark Langston appeared to have struck out Tino Martinez on a 2–2 pitch with the bases loaded and two outs in the 7th inning with the game tied at 5–5. Garcia, however, called the pitch a ball, and Martinez hit Langston's next pitch for a grand slam.

Garcia took part in the 1999 Major League Umpires Association mass resignation which was engineered by Richie Phillips, the union's executive director. When the strategy backfired, Garcia lost his job because his resignation was one of the 22 accepted by Major League Baseball. After working as a consultant for the baseball commissioner's office, he was hired as an MLB umpire supervisor in 2002. Garcia, along with fellow supervisors Marty Springstead and Jim McKean, were ousted on March 6, 2010, as a result of a 2009 postseason which was plagued by various high-profile questionable calls that drew a firestorm of criticism from fans and the media.

== Outside of Major League Baseball ==
Garcia has instructed at various umpire schools for several years and also conducted umpiring clinics during the offseason while serving as an active major league umpire.

Garcia played the first base umpire in the 1999 movie For Love of the Game, starring Kevin Costner and Kelly Preston.

Garcia currently resides in Clearwater. He and his wife Sheryl have four children and ten grandchildren. He is the father-in-law of current MLB umpire Vic Carapazza.

== See also ==
- List of Major League Baseball umpires
