= 1997 American League Division Series =

Teams
Team (Wins)		Manager	Season
Baltimore Orioles (3)		Davey Johnson	98–64 (.605), GA: 2
Seattle Mariners (1)		Lou Piniella	90–72 (.556), GA: 6
- Dates: October 1–5
- Television: NBC (Game 1); ESPN (Games 2, 4); Fox (Game 3)
- TV announcers: Bob Costas, Joe Morgan, and Bob Uecker (Game 1); Jon Miller and Joe Morgan (Games 2, 4); Thom Brennaman and Bob Brenly (Game 3)
- Radio: CBS
- Radio announcers: John Rooney and Al Downing
- Umpires: Games 1–2: Tim McClelland, Dale Ford, Ken Kaiser, Greg Kosc, Dave Phillips, Rocky Roe; Games 3–4: Tim Tschida, Dan Morrison, Rick Reed, Dale Scott, Rich Garcia, Derryl Cousins

Teams
Team (Wins)		Manager	Season
Cleveland Indians (3)		Mike Hargrove	86–75 (.534), GA: 6
New York Yankees (2)		Joe Torre	96–66 (.593), GB: 2
- Dates: September 30–October 6
- Television: Fox (Games 1–2, 4–5); NBC (Game 3)
- TV announcers: Joe Buck, Tim McCarver, and Bob Brenly (Games 1–2, 4–5); Bob Costas, Joe Morgan, and Bob Uecker (Game 3)
- Radio: CBS
- Radio announcers: Ernie Harwell and Jeff Torborg
- Umpires: Games 1–2: Tim Tschida, Dan Morrison, Rick Reed, Dale Scott, Rich Garcia, Derryl Cousins; Games 3–5: Tim McClelland, Dale Ford, Ken Kaiser, Greg Kosc, Dave Phillips, Rocky Roe

The 1997 American League Division Series (ALDS), consisted of two best-of-five playoff series on the American League side in Major League Baseball’s (MLB) 1997 postseason, began on Tuesday, September 30, and ended on Monday, October 6, with the champions of the three AL divisions—along with a "wild card" team—participating in two series.

Under MLB's playoff format from 1995 to 1997, home field advantage was assigned to two of the three division champions on a rotating basis, regardless of record. The wild card team was then matched up against whichever of those two home-field division champions held the better record, unless it created an intradivisional matchup, as no two teams from the same division could be matched up in the Division Series, regardless of whether the format at the time would suggest such a matchup. Home field priority for division champions for the 1997 AL postseason was as follows: (1) East, (2) Central, (3) West. The matchups were:

- (1) Baltimore Orioles (AL East champions) vs. (3) Seattle Mariners (AL West champions): Orioles won the series, 3–1.
- (2) Cleveland Indians (AL Central champions) vs. (4) New York Yankees (Wild Card qualifier): Indians won the series, 3–2.

The team with home field "advantage" was required to play the first two games on the road, with potentially the last three at home, in order to reduce travel.

The Orioles and Indians went on to meet in the AL Championship Series (ALCS). The Indians became the American League champion, and lost to the National League champion Florida Marlins in the 1997 World Series.

== Matchups ==
=== Baltimore Orioles vs. Seattle Mariners ===
Baltimore won the series, 3–1.

Game	Date	Score	Location	Time	Attendance
1	October 1	Baltimore Orioles – 9, Seattle Mariners – 3	Kingdome	3:14	59,579
2	October 2	Baltimore Orioles – 9, Seattle Mariners – 3	Kingdome	3:25	59,309
3	October 4	Seattle Mariners – 4, Baltimore Orioles – 2	Oriole Park at Camden Yards	3:26	49,137
4	October 5	Seattle Mariners – 1, Baltimore Orioles – 3	Oriole Park at Camden Yards	2:42	48,766

=== Cleveland Indians vs. New York Yankees ===
Cleveland won the series, 3–2.

Game	Date	Score	Location	Time	Attendance
1	September 30	Cleveland Indians – 6, New York Yankees – 8	Yankee Stadium (I)	3:28	57,398
2	October 2	Cleveland Indians – 7, New York Yankees – 5	Yankee Stadium (I)	3:32	57,360
3	October 4	New York Yankees – 6, Cleveland Indians – 1	Jacobs Field	2:59	45,274
4	October 5	New York Yankees – 2, Cleveland Indians – 3	Jacobs Field	3:22	45,231
5	October 6	New York Yankees – 3, Cleveland Indians – 4	Jacobs Field	3:29	45,203

== Baltimore vs. Seattle ==
=== Game 1 ===
October 1, 1997 5:07 pm (PDT) at Kingdome in Seattle, Washington 72 °F (22 °C), dome
Team	1	2	3	4	5	6	7	8	9	R	H	E
Baltimore	0	0	1	0	4	4	0	0	0	9	13	0
Seattle	0	0	0	1	0	0	1	0	1	3	7	1
WP: Mike Mussina (1–0) LP: Randy Johnson (0–1); Home runs: BAL: Gerónimo Berroa (1), Chris Hoiles (1); SEA: Edgar Martínez (1), Jay Buhner (1), Alex Rodriguez (1); Attendance: 59,579; Boxscore

The Orioles had gone wire-to-wire and the Mariners had won the AL West for the second time in the decade. In Game 1, both teams had their best on the mound: Mike Mussina for the Orioles and Randy Johnson for the Mariners. The game was scoreless until Mike Bordick hit an RBI double after a walk for the Orioles in the third, but Edgar Martínez's home run tied the game in the fourth. In the fifth, after two walks, Brady Anderson's RBI single put the Orioles up 2–1. After a sacrifice bunt moved the runners up, Eric Davis's two-run single made it 4–1 Orioles. Davis was caught stealing second for the second out, but Gerónimo Berroa's home run extended the lead to 5–1. Next inning, Chris Hoiles's lead off home run off Mike Timlin made it 6–1 Orioles. Rafael Palmeiro then doubled and one out later, scored on Mike Bordick's double. After a ground out and intentional walk, Paul Spoljaric relieved Timlin and allowed a two-run double to B. J. Surhoff's. The Mariners got their final two runs on home runs by Jay Buhner and Alex Rodriguez in the seventh off Mussina and ninth off Armando Benitez, respectively.

=== Game 2 ===
October 2, 1997 1:08 pm (PDT) at Kingdome in Seattle, Washington 72 °F (22 °C), dome
Team	1	2	3	4	5	6	7	8	9	R	H	E
Baltimore	0	1	0	0	2	0	2	4	0	9	14	0
Seattle	2	0	0	0	0	0	1	0	0	3	9	0
WP: Scott Erickson (1–0) LP: Jamie Moyer (0–1); Home runs: BAL: Harold Baines (1), Brady Anderson (1); SEA: None; Attendance: 59,309; Boxscore

Scott Erickson faced Jamie Moyer in Game 2 and the situation cried for a Mariner victory. In the bottom of the first, the Mariners got two runs after a leadoff single and subsequent double on RBI groundouts by Ken Griffey and Edgar Martinez, but Harold Baines homered to make it a one-run game in the second and in the fifth, after Moyer got two quick outs, he surrendered a walk and a single. Moyer then left the game with a strained flexor in his left elbow. Roberto Alomar would double in two runs off Paul Spoljaric to give the Orioles a 3–2 lead. In the seventh, Brady Anderson's two-run home run after a walk off Bobby Ayala gave the Orioles a commanding 5–2 lead. The Mariners got a run in the bottom of the inning when Paul Sorrento drew a leadoff walk off Scott Erickson, moved to second on a passed ball and scored on Rob Ducey's RBI single, but the Orioles widened the gap in the eighth off Ayala. After loading the bases on a single, double and intentional walk, Lenny Webster walked to force in a run before Mike Bordick's two-run single made it 8–3. Norm Charlton relieved Ayala and allowed an RBI double to Brady Anderson. The Orioles cruised to their second straight 9–3 win and were up 2–0 in the series heading to Baltimore. This would be the final postseason game played at the Kingdome.

=== Game 3 ===
October 4, 1997 1:32 pm (EDT) at Oriole Park at Camden Yards in Baltimore, Maryland 77 °F (25 °C), sunny
Team	1	2	3	4	5	6	7	8	9	R	H	E
Seattle	0	0	1	0	1	0	0	0	2	4	11	0
Baltimore	0	0	0	0	0	0	0	0	2	2	5	0
WP: Jeff Fassero (1–0) LP: Jimmy Key (0–1); Home runs: SEA: Jay Buhner (2), Paul Sorrento (1); BAL: None; Attendance: 49,137; Boxscore

In a must-win game for the Mariners, Jeff Fassero took the mound against Jimmy Key, who was looking to end the series. In the third, Roberto Kelly hit an RBI double after a Rich Amaral single for the Mariners. In the fifth, Ken Griffey Jr. drove in a run with a base hit to make it 2–0 Mariners. The score remained 2–0 and Fassero had shut the Orioles out through eight innings. In the ninth, Jay Buhner and Paul Sorrento hit one-out back-to-back home runs off Terry Matthews to give the Mariners a 4–0 lead. These would turn out to be the deciding runs as the Orioles rallied in the bottom half. After Jeff Fassero walked Geronimo Berroa to lead it off, Rafael Palmeiro singled off Heathcliff Slocumb, who got two outs before Jeffrey Hammonds's two-run double put the tying run at the plate in the person of Harold Baines, but Baines popped out to ensure a Game 4.

=== Game 4 ===
October 5, 1997 4:07 pm (EDT) at Oriole Park at Camden Yards in Baltimore, Maryland 85 °F (29 °C), sunny
Team	1	2	3	4	5	6	7	8	9	R	H	E
Seattle	0	1	0	0	0	0	0	0	0	1	2	0
Baltimore	2	0	0	0	1	0	0	0	X	3	7	0
WP: Mike Mussina (2–0) LP: Randy Johnson (0–2) Sv: Randy Myers (1); Home runs: SEA: Edgar Martínez (2); BAL: Jeff Reboulet (1), Gerónimo Berroa (2); Attendance: 48,766; Boxscore

Randy Johnson and Mike Mussina faced off again in game 4. In the bottom of the first, Johnson gave up a one-out home run to Jeff Reboulet, a double to Geronimo Berroa, and an RBI single to Cal Ripken Jr., but Edgar Martínez's home run in the second made it a one-run game. Gerónimo Berroa's home run in the fifth gave the Orioles a two-run edge. Mussina and Johnson dueled on even terms until Mussina was pulled in the eighth in favor of Armando Benítez. The Orioles' bullpen managed to hang onto a 3–1 clinching victory that put the Orioles back in the ALCS for the second straight year.

=== Composite box ===
1997 ALDS (3–1): Baltimore Orioles over Seattle Mariners

Team	1	2	3	4	5	6	7	8	9	R	H	E
Baltimore Orioles	2	1	1	0	7	4	2	4	2	23	39	0
Seattle Mariners	2	1	1	1	1	0	2	0	3	11	29	1
Total attendance: 216,791 Average attendance: 54,198

== Cleveland vs. New York ==
=== Game 1 ===
September 30, 1997 8:15 pm (EDT) at Yankee Stadium (I) in Bronx, New York 68 °F (20 °C), clear
Team	1	2	3	4	5	6	7	8	9	R	H	E
Cleveland	5	0	0	1	0	0	0	0	0	6	11	0
New York	0	1	0	1	1	5	0	0	X	8	11	0
WP: Ramiro Mendoza (1–0) LP: Eric Plunk (0–1) Sv: Mariano Rivera (1); Home runs: CLE: Sandy Alomar Jr. (1); NYY: Tino Martinez (1), Tim Raines (1), Derek Jeter (1), Paul O'Neill (1); Attendance: 57,398; Boxscore

Game 1 saw a matchup of Orel Hershiser and David Cone. In the top of the first, Bip Roberts drew a leadoff walk, stole second, moved to third on a sacrifice bunt, and scored on Manny Ramirez's single. Ramirez moved to second on another single, then to third on a forceout before scoring on wild pitch. After Matt Williams was hit by a pitch, Sandy Alomar Jr.'s three-run homer, the first of his nineteen RBIs in the 1997 postseason, capped the scoring at 5–0. The Yankees loaded the bases in the second on a single and two walks with no outs, but scored just one run on Wade Boggs's forceout. The Indians got that run back in the fourth when Marquis Grissom tripled and scored on Roberts's single. Tino Martinez's home run in the bottom half cut the lead to 6–2, then next inning, after a leadoff single and double, Tim Raines's sacrifice fly made it 6–3 Indians. In the sixth, the Yankees completed a five-run comeback. Boggs singled with one out, moved to third on a groundout and scored on Rey Sanchez's single, then Tim Raines, Derek Jeter, and Paul O'Neill hit three straight home runs to give the Yankees an 8–6 edge. It was a lead the Yankee bullpen would not squander. Mariano Rivera got the save in the ninth. Having seen a five-run lead disappear, the Indians appeared demoralized.

=== Game 2 ===
October 2, 1997 8:13 pm (EDT) at Yankee Stadium (I) in Bronx, New York 60 °F (16 °C), overcast
Team	1	2	3	4	5	6	7	8	9	R	H	E
Cleveland	0	0	0	5	2	0	0	0	0	7	11	1
New York	3	0	0	0	0	0	0	1	1	5	7	2
WP: Jaret Wright (1–0) LP: Andy Pettitte (0–1); Home runs: CLE: Matt Williams (1); NYY: Derek Jeter (2); Attendance: 57,360; Boxscore

The seemingly overmatched Jaret Wright faced Andy Pettitte in Game 2. After three straight one-out walks loaded the bases in the bottom of the first, the Yankees jumped out to a 3–0 first inning lead on a two-run double by Tino Martinez and a sacrifice fly by Charlie Hayes. In the top of the fifth with two on, three straight RBI singles by David Justice, Sandy Alomar, and Jim Thome tied the game, then Tony Fernandez's two-run double put the Indians up 5–3. Next inning, Matt Williams's two-run home run extended the lead to 7–3 The Yankees would get two runs against José Mesa on Mike Stanley's bases-loaded hit-by-pitch in the eighth and Derek Jeter's home run in the ninth, but the Indians' lead stood and the series was tied at a game apiece.

=== Game 3 ===
October 4, 1997 7:42 pm (EDT) at Jacobs Field in Cleveland, Ohio 80 °F (27 °C), clear
Team	1	2	3	4	5	6	7	8	9	R	H	E
New York	1	0	1	4	0	0	0	0	0	6	4	1
Cleveland	0	1	0	0	0	0	0	0	0	1	5	1
WP: David Wells (1–0) LP: Charles Nagy (0–1); Home runs: NYY: Paul O'Neill (2); CLE: None; Attendance: 45,274; Boxscore

David Wells faced Charles Nagy in Game 3. An error by Nagy gave Wells a 1–0 lead in the first on Paul O'Neill's RBI single with two on, but the Indians would tie the game in the second on Tony Fernandez's forceout with two on. Derek Jeter gave the Yankees the lead in the third when he walked, stole second, and scored on Tino Martinez's RBI hit. In the fourth, the Yankees loaded the bases on three walks off Nagy before Paul O'Neill hit a grand slam off Chad Ogea that gave them a commanding 6–1 lead and silenced the Jacobs Field crowd. Rain was a constant throughout the game and the rain fell on the Indians' parade as the Yankees took a 2–1 series lead.

=== Game 4 ===
October 5, 1997 7:31 pm (EDT) at Jacobs Field in Cleveland, Ohio 76 °F (24 °C), clear
Team	1	2	3	4	5	6	7	8	9	R	H	E
New York	2	0	0	0	0	0	0	0	0	2	9	1
Cleveland	0	1	0	0	0	0	0	1	1	3	9	0
WP: Mike Jackson (1–0) LP: Ramiro Mendoza (1–1); Home runs: NYY: None; CLE: David Justice (1), Sandy Alomar Jr. (2); Attendance: 45,231; Boxscore

Game 4 proved memorable as two veteran starters, Dwight Gooden and Orel Hershiser, battled back and forth. The Yankees jumped out to a 2–0 lead in the first when Derek Jeter hit a one-out double and scored on an RBI double by Paul O'Neill, then after a groundout and hit-by-pitch, Cecil Fielder hit an RBI single. This was all they could muster off Hershiser, whose postseason legend continued to improve. A home run in the second by David Justice cut that 2–0 in half and gave the Indians cause for hope. However, Gooden and the Yankees bullpen kept the Indians scoreless until the bottom of the eighth. With two outs and Mariano Rivera on the mound, the Indians looked finished. Having posted 43 saves during the regular season, Rivera appeared to be the executioner. However, Sandy Alomar Jr. homered to tie the game and that homer gave birth to his postseason legacy in 1997. This would be Rivera's only blown save in the playoffs until 2001. In the ninth, Marquis Grissom singled to lead off the inning off Ramiro Mendoza. A bunt moved him to second and Omar Vizquel hit a single that rolled past Derek Jeter to the outfield grass. That allowed Grissom to score the game-winning run.

=== Game 5 ===
October 6, 1997 8:12 pm (EDT) at Jacobs Field in Cleveland, Ohio 76 °F (24 °C), clear
Team	1	2	3	4	5	6	7	8	9	R	H	E
New York	0	0	0	0	2	1	0	0	0	3	12	0
Cleveland	0	0	3	1	0	0	0	0	X	4	7	2
WP: Jaret Wright (2–0) LP: Andy Pettitte (0–2) Sv: José Mesa (1); Attendance: 45,203; Boxscore

With the momentum on their side, the Indians looked to finish off the defending champs. Andy Pettitte and Jaret Wright once again faced off. The Indians would take a 3–0 lead in the third after two one-out singles were followed by a two-out two-run double by Manny Ramírez and RBI single by Matt Williams. Then Sandy Alomar doubled to lead off the fourth, moved to third on a sacrifice bunt, and scored on a fly by Tony Fernández to make it 4–0 Indians. However, the Yankees gave the Indians cause to pause in the fifth when errors by Alomar and Ramirez allowed two-runs to score on Bernie Williams's single. Then Mike Stanley hit a leadoff double in the sixth and scored on Wade Boggs's pinch hit RBI single to make it a one-run game. The score remained 4–3 and the Yankees blew multiple chances to take the lead. The Indians also had their share of chances to put the series away. The frustration mounted in the ninth when Paul O'Neill's two-out double gave Bernie Williams a chance to hit the go-ahead home run off José Mesa, but Mesa got Williams to fly out on a fairly deep fly ball to Brian Giles to end the series and ensure a new World Champion in 1997.

=== Composite box ===
1997 ALDS (3–2): Cleveland Indians over New York Yankees

Team	1	2	3	4	5	6	7	8	9	R	H	E
Cleveland Indians	5	2	3	7	2	0	0	1	1	21	43	4
New York Yankees	6	1	1	5	3	6	0	1	1	24	43	4
Total attendance: 250,466 Average attendance: 50,093
