= Joe West (umpire) =

American baseball umpire (born 1952)

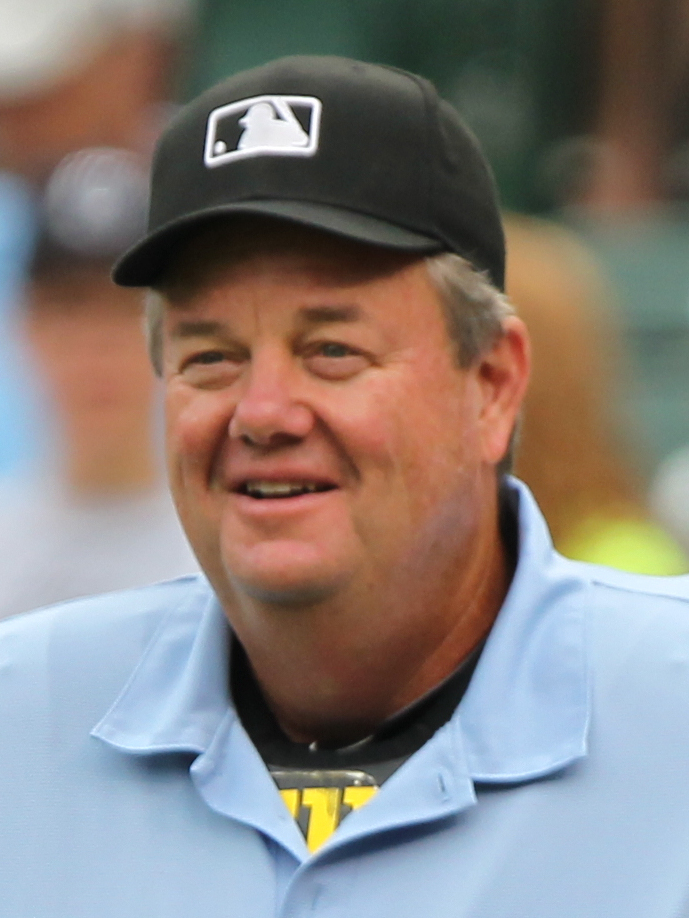
- West in 2011
- Umpire
- Born: October 31, 1952 (age 74); Asheville, North Carolina, U.S.

MLB (NL) debut
- September 14, 1976

Last appearance
- October 6, 2021

Career highlights and awards
- Special Assignments: All-Star Game (1987, 2005, 2017); Wild Card Game (2013, 2014, 2020, 2021); Division Series (1995, 2002, 2005, 2008, 2009, 2011, 2012, 2016); League Championship Series (1981, 1986, 1988, 1993, 1996, 2003, 2004, 2013, 2014, 2018); World Series (1992, 1997, 2005, 2009, 2012, 2016); World Baseball Classic (2009); MLB in Omaha (2019); MLB record 43 seasons umpired; MLB record 5,460 games umpired

Joseph Henry West (born October 31, 1952), nicknamed "Cowboy Joe" or "Country Joe", is an American former baseball umpire. He worked in Major League Baseball (MLB) from 1976 to 2021, umpiring an MLB-record 43 seasons and 5,460 games.

Born in Asheville, North Carolina, he grew up in Greenville and played football at East Carolina University (ECU) and Elon College. West entered the National League (NL) as an umpire in 1976; he joined the NL staff full-time in 1978. As a young umpire, he worked Nolan Ryan's fifth career no-hitter, was on the field for Willie McCovey's 500th home run, and was involved in a 1983 pushing incident with manager Joe Torre. West resigned during the 1999 Major League Umpires Association mass resignation but was rehired in 2002. He served as crew chief for the 2005 World Series and officiated in the 2009 World Baseball Classic. On May 25, 2021, West broke Bill Klem's all-time record by umpiring his 5,376th game.

West worked several no-hitters, including a 2012 perfect game by Félix Hernández. He officiated six World Series, three All-Star Games, ten League Championship Series (LCS), eight League Division Series (LDS) and four Wild Card Games. West was president of the Major League Baseball Umpires Association through 2018. As the organization's president, he helped negotiate the largest umpiring contract in baseball history. He works with a sporting goods company to design and patent umpiring equipment endorsed by MLB.

== Early life ==
West was born in Asheville, North Carolina, in 1952. He grew up in Greenville, North Carolina, where he played youth baseball and football. He graduated from JH Rose High School in Greenville. West played safety on the first-year football team at East Carolina University (ECU) in 1970 and he was a quarterback for Elon College (now Elon University) from 1971 to 1973. He intended to play his college football career at ECU, but head coach Mike McGee resigned after his first year, prompting West's transfer.

While in college, West hoped to play both baseball and football. However, spring practice for football interfered with West's ability to be on the baseball team. He concentrated on football and umpired high school baseball games on the side. In his three seasons at Elon, West was the starting quarterback and the team won three conference championships. He was named Most Valuable Player (MVP) on the 1973 team that lost the NAIA Division I title game to Abilene Christian; the Abilene Christian team was led by future professional football players Clint Longley and Wilbert Montgomery. West left Elon holding three passing records that were not broken for 20 years and was inducted into the Elon Sports Hall of Fame in 1986.

== Umpiring career ==
=== Early career ===
While umpiring locally as a college student, West met Carolina League umpire supervisor Malcolm Sykes, who recommended that West attend an umpire training school. West went to umpire school and graduated at the top of his class. He worked in several minor-league circuits (the Western Carolinas League, Puerto Rican League, Florida Instructional League, Southern League and American Association) before he was promoted to the major leagues. West made his first National League (NL) appearance in 1976 and joined the full-time NL staff in 1978.

In his first season as a full-time MLB umpire, West umpired the game in which Willie McCovey hit his 500th career home run. In the same year, he was at first base when Pete Rose tied the modern NL record for most consecutive games with a hit (37, set by Tommy Holmes of the 1945 Boston Braves), and he was the home plate umpire when Rose broke it the following day. In 1981, West worked first base for Nolan Ryan's fifth career no-hitter. On October 13, 1981, West was 28 when he became the youngest NL umpire to call a League Championship Series.

In July 1983, West was suspended for three days and fined $500 for shoving Atlanta Braves manager Joe Torre. The manager was angry at the end of a game and had followed West into the walkway outside the umpires' dressing room to argue with him. On appeal, NL President Chub Feeney reduced West's fine to $300. Torre also received a fine stemming from the incident. This was believed to be the first incident of an umpire being suspended during a baseball season in decades.

During a game between the New York Mets and Atlanta Braves at Shea Stadium on May 9, 1984, West ejected two cameramen with SportsChannel after they allowed coach Bobby Valentine and pitcher Mike Torrez of the Mets to watch the replay of a close call that had ended the fourth inning.

=== 1986–2001 ===
West made his second NLCS appearance in 1986. He umpired his first All-Star Game in 1987. On September 28, 1988, West was on the field when Orel Hershiser set the MLB record for consecutive scoreless innings pitched. West returned to the NLCS in 1988 and was the plate umpire when Dodgers pitcher Jay Howell was ejected for having pine tar on his glove.

During a 1990 on-field brawl between the Philadelphia Phillies and New York Mets, West attempted to break up the fight by throwing Phillies pitcher Dennis Cook to the ground. The matter ultimately was handled among West, NL President Bill White, then-Commissioner Fay Vincent, and the umpires' union. West said White supported his actions in the brawl, but White quickly issued a statement saying he had prohibited West from making further physical contact with players. White was reported to have nearly resigned due to a lack of support from Vincent, but the NL president remained in his post after receiving approval from league owners. West met more controversy the following year when Chicago Cubs outfielder Andre Dawson bumped him after a called third strike during a game at Wrigley Field. After Dawson was ejected from the game, he walked back to the dugout and tossed 14 bats onto the field. Chicago fans threw debris onto the field, causing a delay in the game. Dawson received a one-game suspension and a $1,000 fine. On his check to the league, Dawson wrote "donation for the blind".

In 1992, West made his first World Series appearance when the Atlanta Braves faced the Toronto Blue Jays. West was behind the plate in the first World Series game played in Canada and ejected Braves manager Bobby Cox for throwing a helmet onto the field. In 1993, he appeared in the NLCS. He worked another no-hitter on April 8, 1994, when Kent Mercker shut down the Los Angeles Dodgers. The 1995 NLDS was West's first League Division Series. The following year West worked in the NLCS. He returned to the World Series in 1997 when the Cleveland Indians faced the Florida Marlins.

In 1999, West was among 22 MLB umpires who engaged in mass resignations during a labor dispute. The strategy backfired when MLB accepted the resignations instead of entering into further negotiations with the umpiring union. The union filed charges against MLB with the National Labor Relations Board, saying the mass resignation was "a concerted action protected by law". After arbitration and appeals, MLB settled with the union. A few umpires received severance pay and were allowed to retire under the settlement, but MLB rehired West and several other umpires in 2002.

=== 2002–2021 ===
In the same year he returned to the field, West worked in the ALDS. He also umpired in the 2003 and 2004 ALCS. In game six of the latter series, West's crew ruled Yankees batter Alex Rodriguez out for interference after Rodriguez appeared to swat the ball out of the glove of opposing pitcher Bronson Arroyo on his way to first base. Fans threw debris on the field, Red Sox manager Terry Francona pulled his team off the field, and NYPD officers in riot gear took to the field to calm the crowd. West said fans actually applauded the umpires for the correct call when they came onto the field the following day. West's first All-Star Game and World Series appearances after his rehire came in 2005; that year he umpired in his second ALDS and his third World Series, serving as World Series crew chief.

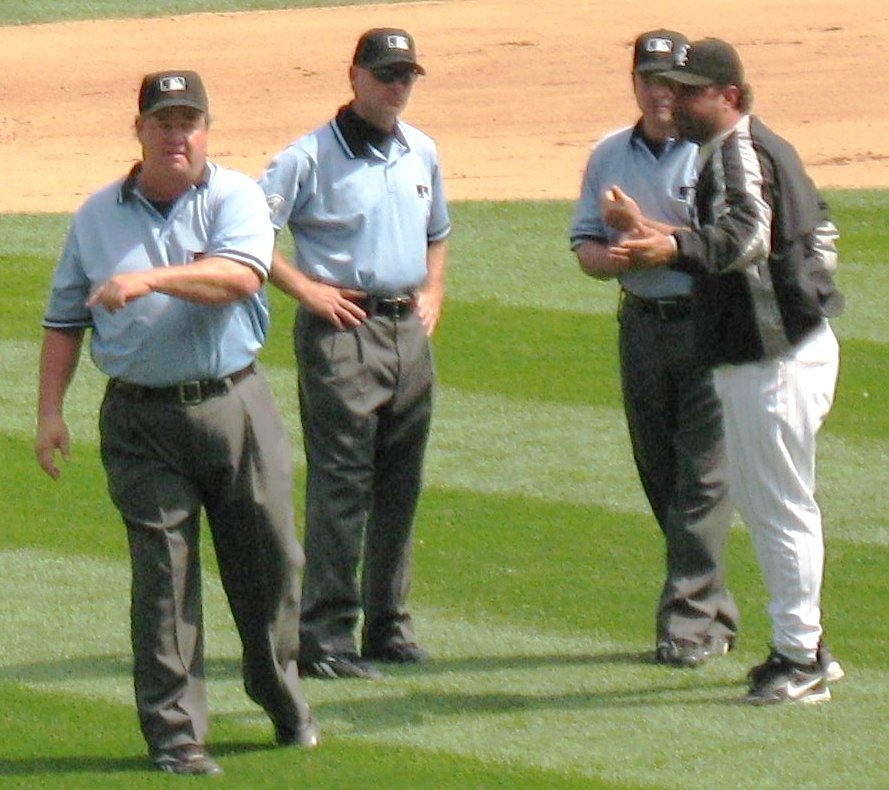
West (left) ejects Chicago White Sox manager Ozzie Guillén in 2007.

West was the home plate umpire when rookie pitcher Clay Buchholz threw a no-hitter against the Baltimore Orioles on September 1, 2007, at Fenway Park; West called a curveball strike three for the final out. He worked his 4,000th career game on July 30, 2009, at Miller Park in Milwaukee, Wisconsin; he ejected Washington Nationals manager Jim Riggleman from the contest. That same year he appeared in the American League Division Series and the World Series. He was also elected president of the World Umpires Association (WUA). West and the union's governing board negotiated the largest umpiring contract in the history of MLB. The contract ran from 2010 through the 2014 season. West designed the chest protector sold commercially as the West Vest, now marketed by Wilson Sporting Goods. He held patents on the West Vest in the US, Australia, Canada, and Japan. He also designed Wilson's high-end umpiring gear, the only umpiring equipment endorsed by MLB.

In 2010, West sparked controversy by criticizing the slow pace of a recently completed series between the New York Yankees and Boston Red Sox, which he called "pathetic and embarrassing". Red Sox manager Terry Francona referred to the remarks as "troubling," while Yankees closer Mariano Rivera remarked, "If he has places to go, let him do something else." Columnist Wallace Matthews defended West, saying the umpire was simply expressing what people had been thinking for a long time. West was not fined by MLB for his comments but was "admonished firmly," according to press reports. On May 26, 2010, West made two controversial balk calls on Mark Buehrle and consequently ejected White Sox manager Ozzie Guillén for arguing and Buehrle for throwing his glove which led to the Chicago announcer asserting that West was becoming a "joke to the umpiring profession" and was "in need of a suspension." On August 26, 2010, West was the plate umpire for Albert Pujols' 400th career home run.

On September 14, 2014, West ejected Jonathan Papelbon for the lewd act of adjusting his groin, resulting in a confrontation where West grabbed Papelbon's jersey. MLB subsequently suspended Papelbon for seven games for his lewd act and West for one game for initiating contact with Papelbon. West later claimed Papelbon had initiated first contact, but Major League Baseball determined that the video replay showed West was not correct, and that the contact was initiated by West.

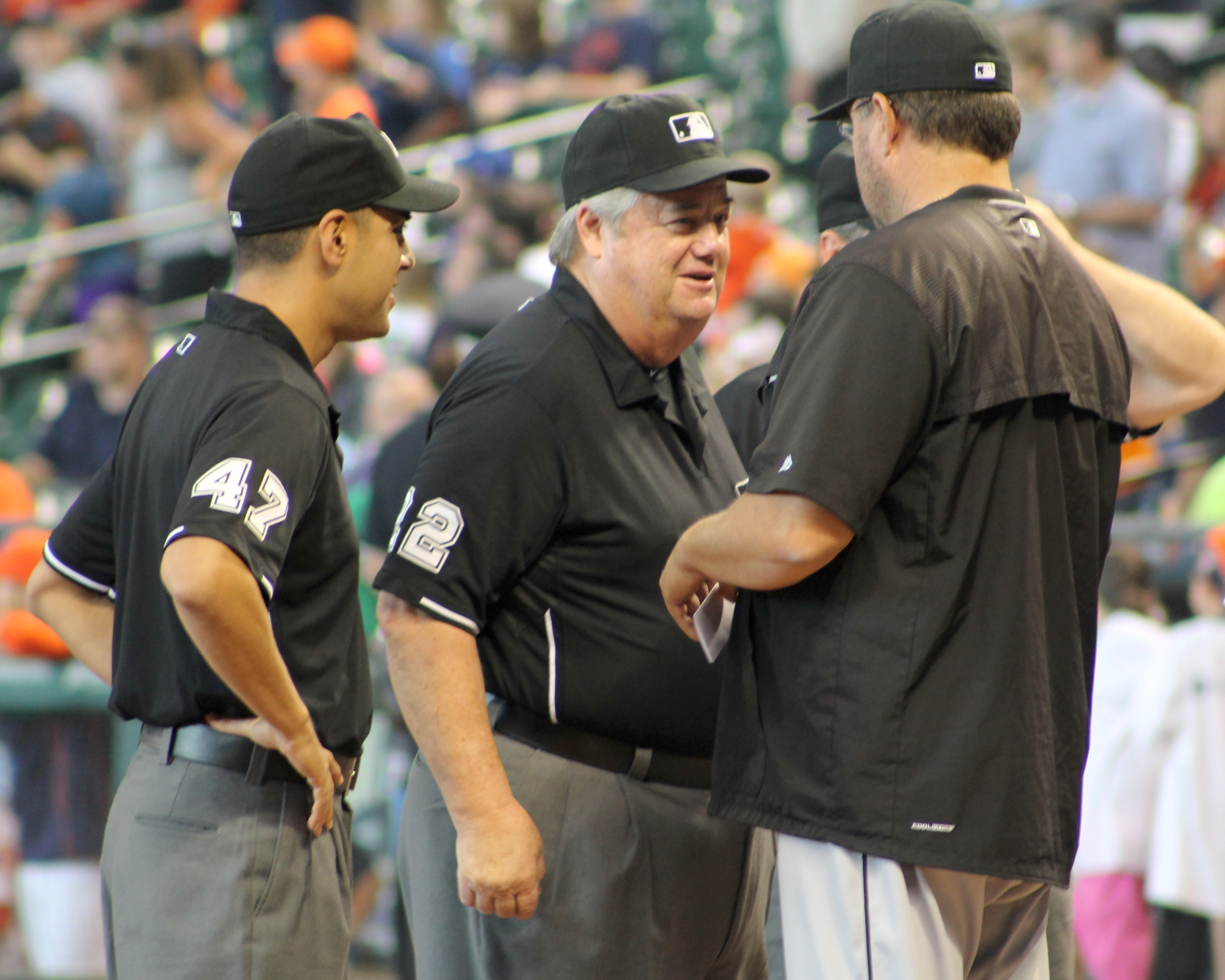
West (center) before a May 2015 game

West umpired in his second NLDS (and fifth LDS) in 2011. The next year West was the first base umpire for Félix Hernández's August 15 perfect game against the Tampa Bay Rays. He umpired another NLDS that year, then appeared in his fifth World Series. His career has spanned the tenure of baseball commissioners Bowie Kuhn, Peter Ueberroth, Bart Giamatti, Fay Vincent, Bud Selig, and Rob Manfred. The 2015 season was West's 38th in MLB, making him MLB's most senior umpire. Umpire Bruce Froemming, who was previously the most senior umpire, spent 37 seasons in MLB, retiring at the end of the 2007 season.

On August 9, 2017, West was suspended for three games after making inappropriate comments about Adrián Beltré. Beltre defended West, stating that he thought the suspension was unnecessary and that West had made the comments in jest.

In the bottom of the first inning of Game 4 of the 2018 ALCS, a deep drive and potential two-run homer to right field by Houston's Jose Altuve, which Boston's Mookie Betts nearly caught with a leaping grab at the wall, was ruled by West to be an out due to fan interference. West, the crew chief for the series, made the call from his right field position; the call stood after review by video replay. The call was widely discussed in coverage of the game and on social media such as Twitter.

On August 14, 2019, West umpired his 5,164th Major League Baseball game to move past Bruce Froemming for the second-most number of major league games officiated. Only Bill Klem, who umpired from 1905 to 1941, had called more games than West.

On October 22, 2019, West filed a defamation lawsuit in New York against Paul Lo Duca and Action Network over comments that the former New York Mets catcher made on a podcast in April 2019. On the podcast, Lo Duca recalled his teammate Billy Wagner telling him in 2006–2007, "Joe loves antique cars so every time he comes into town I lend him my '57 Chevy so he can drive it around so then he opens up the strike zone for me." In the complaint, West denied this and said he suffered unspecified damages as a result of Lo Duca's comments. West was later awarded $500,000 in damages.

On July 30, 2020, while umpiring the Washington Nationals–Toronto Blue Jays game, West was hit on the side of the head when Bo Bichette lost his bat. He left the game in the bottom of the first inning but returned in the top of the third as the third base umpire.

On May 25, 2021, West surpassed Bill Klem's major league record by umpiring his 5,376th career game, in a contest between the White Sox and Cardinals at Guaranteed Rate Field. West announced he would retire after the 2021 postseason; his final assignment was the 2021 National League Wild Card Game, where he was the home plate umpire.

On February 4, 2022, West officially retired.

=== Reception ===
West has been mentioned in several polls of MLB players. In 2006, the spring after he was crew chief in the World Series, a Sports Illustrated survey asked 470 MLB players to identify the best and worst umpires. West was identified as the best MLB umpire by 2 percent of those players, ranking him ninth on that list. With respect to the worst umpire, 6 percent of players in the survey selected West, ranking him fourth. A 2007 review of umpire strike zones by The Hardball Times determined that West "had the fewest number of extra balls and strikes," which the outlet asserted "is a sign of consistency."

In a 2010 poll of 100 players, West ranked as the second-worst umpire in the league. In a 2011 players poll, 41 percent of players polled (the "overwhelming" plurality) named West the worst umpire; only 5 percent of players polled named him as best.

In a 2019 study by Boston University's Mark T. Williams, West was identified as the umpire during the 2018 season with the second-highest percentage of bad ball-and-strike calls when working behind home plate. Over West's last eleven years, he has averaged 21 incorrect calls a game, or 2.3 per inning.

== Outside baseball ==
West is known outside umpiring as a singer-songwriter. His involvement in country music and his demeanor on the field have earned him the nickname "Cowboy Joe". West has described his music as "two chords and the truth. ... It's simple. It tells a story." In 2009, West said of his musical pursuits, "I was lucky. You know, the dues you have to pay to get here as an umpire are long and tedious, but the music business, because I was already in the major leagues, kind of opened a lot of doors I normally wouldn't have been able to open."

West has appeared at the Grand Ole Opry. He has performed with Mickey Gilley, Johnny Lee, and Merle Haggard. West served as a pallbearer for Boxcar Willie.

West released his first album, Blue Cowboy, in 1987. Blue Cowboy is an album of three original songs and five covers. Chuck Yarborough of the Cleveland Plain Dealer said, "Listening to the first excerpt of his "Blue Cowboy" made me balk—you'll pardon the expression—at listening to the second. But I did. And the third. And so on. And now? Well, if I'm Nashville, I run West outta the game." In a September 2012 review, music blog Long After Dark said, "Blue Cowboy easily ranks with Ron Artest and Carl Lewis as one of the worst albums that a sports figure has cut ... ever. I can say that I managed to make it through the record, although it was not easy."

He released Diamond Dreams in 2008. The album was a collaboration with Kent Goodson, pianist for country star George Jones. It tells baseball stories inspired by West's umpiring career. Goodson later said, "As I look back on how this CD came together, I realize that I am a musician and Joe is an umpire. But his love for music and my love for baseball bonded us in this project." Sportswriter Doug Miller said that the album was "a fun, humorous and often touching collection of spoken-word gems in which the listener gets a perfect sampling of the true personality of Cowboy Joe West".

West has made one film appearance, playing a third base umpire in the 1988 comedy film The Naked Gun: From the Files of Police Squad! He also made a cameo appearance on the television crime drama The Oldest Rookie. An avid golfer, West appears on the Celebrity Players Tour.

Following his retirement, in 2023, West attempted to edit his Wikipedia article (this one here) in order to "change unfavorable aspects", specifically with regards to the shoving match with Torre, as well as adding his perspective on information listed, correcting what he claimed were discrepancies in his career section, and attempting to update personal information about himself, specifically his vest patents expiring and his remarriage. His account was indefinitely blocked from editing after making legal threats. Following the block, West explained that his motive in editing his own page was due to being introduced for a speech in Southern California with some remarks that confused him, and he eventually traced the source of the remarks to his Wikipedia page, unaware of the policies against conflict-of-interest editing on Wikipedia (as well as policies against threatening legal action towards the site).

West appeared on the Baseball Hall of Fame Contemporary Era Committee Ballot in 2023, for induction in 2024. He did not receive enough support to be elected in his first try.

== Personal life ==
West has been married twice. After the death of his first wife, West remarried to Jean Jo Mason on December 25, 1988.

In 2012, West was diagnosed with laryngeal cancer, which is now in remission.

== See also ==
- List of Major League Baseball umpires (disambiguation)
