= John Hirschbeck =

American baseball umpire (born 1954)

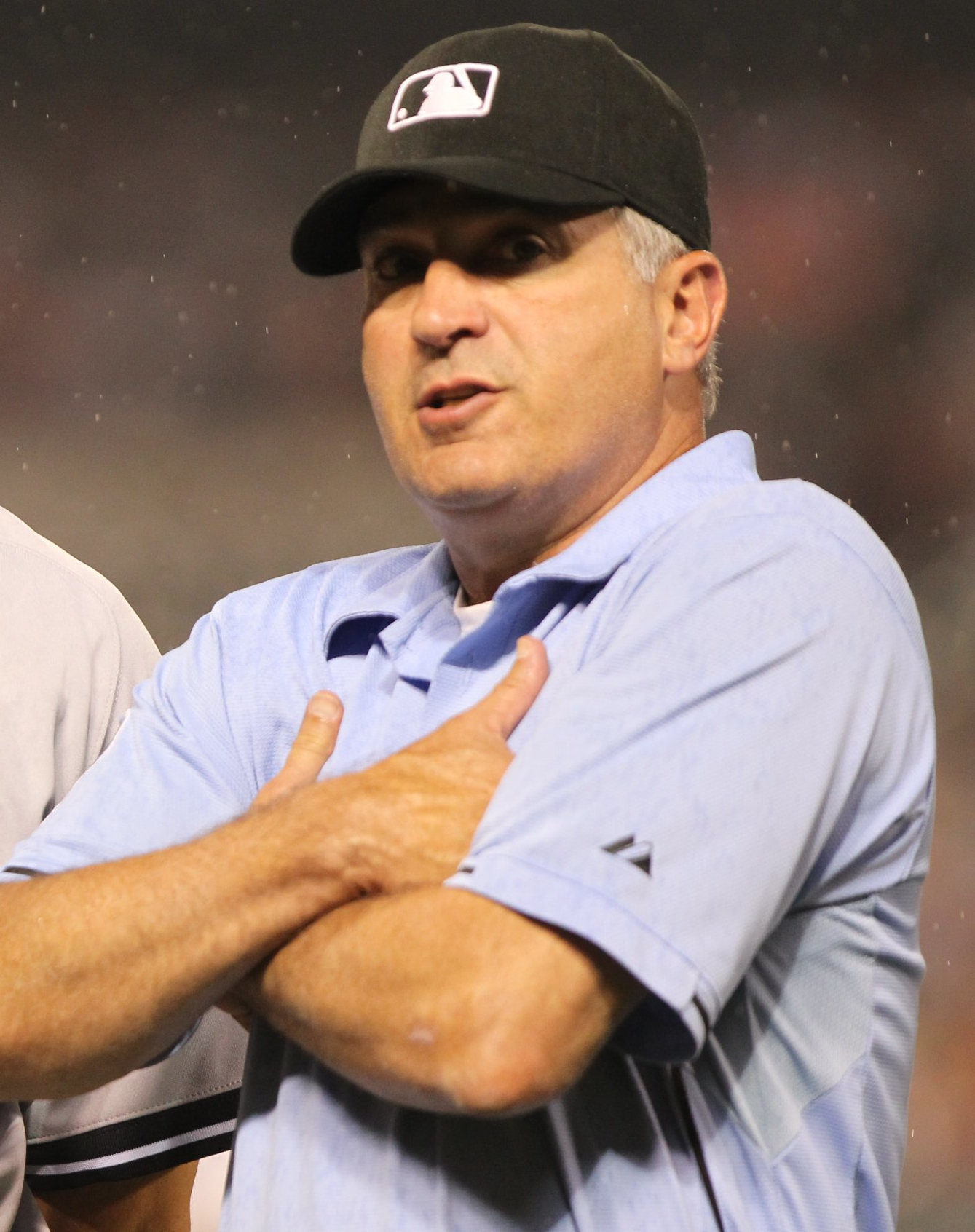
- Hirschbeck in 2011
- Born: September 7, 1954 (age 72); Bridgeport, Connecticut, U.S.

debut
- May 6, 1983

Last appearance
- November 2, 2016

Career highlights and awards
- Special Assignments: All Star Games (1989, 2004, 2013); Wild Card Games (2015); Division Series (1995, 1998, 1999, 2001, 2003, 2005, 2006, 2010, 2013, 2016); League Championship Series (1990, 1997, 2000, 2004, 2015); World Series (1995, 2006, 2010, 2013, 2016)

John Francis Hirschbeck (born September 7, 1954) is an American former umpire for Major League Baseball. He worked in the American League from 1984 to 1999 and worked in both leagues from 2000 to 2016. He was a crew chief at the time of his retirement, and wore uniform number 17 throughout his career. Hirschbeck announced his retirement following the 2016 season. In 2000, Hirschbeck was elected as the first president of the newly certified World Umpires Association, a position he held until 2009.

== Umpiring career ==
Hirschbeck umpired in the All-Star Game three times (1989, 2004, 2013), in the Division Series 10 times (AL: 1995, 1998, 1999, 2005; NL: 2001, 2003, 2006, 2010, 2013, 2016), the American League Championship Series 5 times (1990, 1997, 2000, 2004, 2015), and the World Series five times (1995, 2006, 2010, 2013, 2016) acting as crew chief the latter three times.

=== Controversies ===
Though umpires typically prefer to stay out of the public eye, Hirschbeck found himself in the spotlight after an on-field incident in the final weekend of the regular season on Friday, September 27, 1996, in Toronto when Baltimore Orioles second baseman Roberto Alomar became involved in a heated, two-way argument with Hirschbeck over a called third strike. Hirschbeck ejected Alomar from the game, and Alomar subsequently spat in Hirschbeck's face, claiming that the umpire had used a degrading ethnic slur against him. Lip readers contend that Hirschbeck called Alomar a "faggot" as Alomar walked away, exacerbating an already tense situation. Others maintain that Hirschbeck called Alomar a "son of a bitch" which Alomar may have taken as a direct insult to his mother, especially following an interview on WBAL Radio following the Orioles victory over the Cleveland Indians in that year's ALDS during which an emotional Alomar spoke of the importance of his family when asked about the spitting incident. Alomar, along with other MLB players, claimed that Hirschbeck's personality had become extremely bitter since one son had died from adrenoleukodystrophy (ALD) and another son had been diagnosed with it. Having heard Alomar's remarks, Hirschbeck charged into the Orioles' clubhouse the next day and he had to be restrained by fellow umpire Jim Joyce. Alomar was suspended for five games and required to donate $50,000 to ALD research. By October 5, Hirschbeck said he had forgiven Alomar for the incident. The called third strike which provoked the confrontation was described by Thomas Boswell of The Washington Post as a bad call, "but hardly the worst in history.”

Alomar and Hirschbeck made public apologies to each other on April 22, 1997, standing at home plate and shaking hands in front of the crowd before an Orioles game. "You know, I just wanted to put it behind us," Hirschbeck said on an interview to the Arizona Republic in 2005. "I said something to him once and it just flooded out how sorry he was."

Hirschbeck and Alomar joined forces to raise awareness about ALD and to raise funds for research. They came to regard each other as friends. When asked about the incident at his retirement in 2005, Alomar said, "That, to me, is over and done. It happened over nine years ago. We are now great friends. We have done some things with charity. God put us maybe in this situation for something." Alomar later made a donation of $252,000 for research on ALD.

In 2002, MLB sued the umpires union in a complaint filed in U.S. District Court in Manhattan in an attempt to discipline Hirschbeck, the union's head. The complaint alleged that Hirschbeck had ordered a member of his umpiring crew not to warn a pitcher for intentionally throwing at a batter. The case alleged that Hirschbeck's performance as an umpire was "well below par" and specifically mentioned a May 4, 2002, game in Cleveland which Hirschbeck had umpired at home plate. According to vice president for umpiring Ralph Nelson, thirty of the 127 pitches Hirschbeck had called were incorrect, with twenty-two pitches off the plate called strikes by the umpire. Nelson referred to Hirschbeck's performance in that game as the "worst by any umpire in any Questec game this year by a substantial margin." Baseball had already issued a warning letter to Hirschbeck on May 10, 2002, accusing him of misconduct during a game he had worked on April 28 of that year. In that letter, it was charged that Hirschbeck's actions violated the Official Playing Rules of Major League Baseball, and that Hirschbeck's threat to his supervisor that he would issue needless warnings to pitchers in future games and instruct other umpires to do the same would have "serious repercussions" for Hirschbeck if carried out.

In 2003, Hirschbeck was investigated by MLB after alleged personal threats were made against a top major league official. The threats were alleged to have been made during a discussion between Hirschbeck and Rob Manfred, management's top labor lawyer. Hirschbeck was allegedly upset that a personal acquaintance was one of 26 baseball employees laid off earlier that year.

On May 5, 2013, Hirschbeck ejected Bryce Harper of the Washington Nationals after the outfielder argued a check-swing call for strike three in the first inning of a game against the Pittsburgh Pirates. Though Harper later apologized, according to some observers Hirschbeck was the aggressor in the confrontation, as he started yelling at Harper and walking toward him after the batter had raised his hands in protest. Adam Kilgore of the Washington Post wrote that Hirschbeck should have simply turned his back and ignored Harper rather than escalating the incident. The incident highlighted what was seen by some as a new age of "diva" umpires, with Hirschbeck's actions singled out and referred to as a "display of egotism".

During an ALCS game between the Kansas City Royals and Toronto Blue Jays on October 19, 2015, Hirschbeck ejected Toronto shortstop Troy Tulowitzki between innings after the player had argued a called third strike. Hirschbeck was accused of escalating the situation by approaching Tulowitzki after the fact, actions which were referred to by some observers as "simply unacceptable".

=== Notable games ===
Hirschbeck was the first base umpire at Yankee Stadium when David Wells pitched a perfect game against the Minnesota Twins on May 17, 1998.

He was behind the plate on August 7, 2007, at AT&T Park in San Francisco when Giants slugger Barry Bonds hit his record-breaking 756th career home run.

Hirschbeck was the home plate umpire on October 6, 2010, for the first NLDS game between the Philadelphia Phillies and the Cincinnati Reds at Citizens Bank Park in Philadelphia when the Phillies' Roy Halladay pitched a no-hitter.

He was selected as crew chief for the World Series three times: 2010 (when he worked behind home plate in Game 1), 2013 (home plate Game 1), and 2016 (home plate Game 3).

Hirschbeck's final game as an umpire came in Game 7 of the 2016 World Series between the Chicago Cubs and Cleveland Indians on November 2, 2016. Hirschbeck retired after 34 years as an MLB umpire.

== Personal life ==
According to Hirschbeck, he began umpiring as a senior in high school; short of money to attend his prom, he started umpiring Little League for $5 a game. He continued in college and umpired in the minor leagues for seven years.

He is a 1976 graduate of Central Connecticut State University in New Britain, Connecticut, where he played baseball.

John's brother Mark Hirschbeck served as an umpire from 1988 to 2003, with the pair becoming the first brothers to become major league umpires.

On April 8, 2014, Hirschbeck's son Michael died, 21 years after son John Drew's death from ALD. The cause of death was not immediately known. In January 2015, Hirschbeck announced his planned return to baseball for the 2015 season, explaining how important baseball was to Michael.

=== Cancer ===
On August 23, 2009, Hirschbeck was diagnosed with a form of testicular cancer described as treatable by Dr. Stephen Jones of the Cleveland Clinic, causing Hirschbeck, who had missed the entire 2008 season following back surgery, to miss the remainder of the 2009 season as well. After the tumor was removed via orchiectomy, the cancer was given a 10 percent chance of recurrence, and Hirschbeck returned for the 2010 season.

After working a reduced schedule in 2011 due to back pain, Hirschbeck's cancer returned and he missed the 2012 MLB season. His last contest before returning to umpiring's disabled list was Game 162 of the 2011 regular season between the Boston Red Sox and Baltimore Orioles.

In August 2012 Hirschbeck advised he was again cancer-free and made plans to return to work in 2013. He worked his first Spring Training game after his return to MLB on February 28, 2013, serving as the first base umpire for a Boston-Pittsburgh game.

== See also ==
- List of Major League Baseball umpires (disambiguation)
