= QuesTec =

Digital Media Company

QuesTec was a digital media company that pioneered virtual replay from real-time measurement data for baseball and tennis. Years before competitors introduced similar products, QuesTec had established a reputation for accuracy and reliability. Although originally based on internally developed technology, in 1998 QuesTec moved to tracking technology provided by engineers at the Atlantic Aerospace Electronics Corporation (now a division of L3Harris) led by project manager and group director Paul Baim. QuesTec is best known for its Umpire Information System (UIS), used by Major League Baseball for the purpose of providing feedback and evaluation of Major League umpires.

The QuesTec company, based out of Deer Park, New York, was mostly involved in television replay and graphics throughout its history. In 2001, however, the company signed a 5-year contract with Major League Baseball to use its pitch tracking technology as a means to review the performance of home plate umpires during baseball games. The contract continued through the 2008 season through annual extensions.

== The Umpire Information System ==
The UIS consists of four cameras placed around a ballpark that feed into a computer network and record the locations of pitches throughout the course of a game. Two of the cameras are located high in the stands above the 1st and 3rd base lines to track the trajectory of each pitch. The other two are located at field level and record the stance of the batter so the top and bottom of the strike zone can be set. Computer software then generates CDs that umpires and MLB executives can review and learn from. These CDs include video of the pitches as well as graphic representations of their locations plus feedback on the umpires' accuracy. Paul Baim and the UIS were featured in a 2002 segment of PBS's Scientific American Frontiers called "Baseball Tech".

When first introduced, controversy over the Umpire Information System quickly developed as umpires and players alike voiced concern over the system's accuracy and the fact that limited deployment (6 parks in the first year) might not guarantee uniform umpiring in the remaining parks. In its early trial period, baseball analysts questioned whether QuesTec was producing the consistency in umpiring that was supposed to occur. A report by a QuesTec operator a year later suggested that the system still needed to be tweaked. The controversy was fueled, in part, by several attempts by the World Umpires Association (WUA) to have the system removed through legal action, culminating in a dispute filed with the National Labor Relations Board (NLRB). Meanwhile, a more hands-on approach was taken by former Arizona Diamondbacks pitcher Curt Schilling; Schilling used a bat to smash one of QuesTec's field cameras after being told by an umpire that he wanted to call some of his pitches strikes, but QuesTec made him call them balls, an act that led to a fine for the pitcher. The NLRB grievance was dropped by the WUA as part of the contract negotiations with MLB after the 2005 season, ending the legal challenges to the system.

As the UIS controversy died down and the statistics accumulated, it became clear that the UIS was accomplishing its basic goals of narrowing the strike zone closer to the width of the plate and returning both lower and higher strikes that were typically not called before the system was introduced. In addition, the claims that the system would "ruin the game" have not been fulfilled, as both pitching and hitting statistics in "QuesTec ballparks" have been consistent with comparable statistics for non-QuesTec parks, and players have adapted to the changes brought by the system. As of the end of the 2008 season, the system had analyzed more than 4,800 games. An article assessing Questec's legacy, 20 years after Questec's technology debuted, declared the system had achieved its mission to establish a standardized strike zone consistent with the rule book definition.

The company appears to have ceased operations, as other companies and technologies proved competitive, and is no longer listed on the OTC stock exchange. Never the less, the term 'questec' is still heard throughout Major League Baseball as the generic term for pitch location technology.

== QuesTec stadiums ==
- American Family Field – Milwaukee Brewers
- Angel Stadium of Anaheim – Los Angeles Angels of Anaheim
- Chase Field – Arizona Diamondbacks
- Daikin Park – Houston Astros
- Fenway Park – Boston Red Sox
- Progressive Field – Cleveland Indians
- Oakland–Alameda County Coliseum – Oakland Athletics
- Rate Field – Chicago White Sox
- Shea Stadium – New York Mets (now defunct)
- Tropicana Field – Tampa Bay Rays
- Yankee Stadium – New York Yankees (now defunct)

== See also ==
- PITCHf/x – the pitch tracking system used by MLB Advanced Media from 2007 to 2016
- TrackMan – the pitch tracking system used in MLB's Statcast system since 2017
