= University of Pennsylvania Journal of Business Law =

Law review journal

- University of Pennsylvania Law School
- Discipline: Business law
- Language: English
- Edited by: Nicolle Stracar

Publication details
- Former names: University of Pennsylvania Journal of Labor and Employment Law; University of Pennsylvania Journal of Business and Employment Law
- History: 1997-present
- Publisher: University of Pennsylvania Law School (United States)
- Frequency: Quarterly

Standard abbreviations
- Bluebook: U. Pa. J. Bus. L.
- ISO 4: Univ. Pa. J. Bus. Law

Indexing
- ISSN: 1945-2934

Links
- Journal homepage

The University of Pennsylvania Journal of Business Law is a scholarly journal focusing on issues of business law, corporate governance, securities regulation, capital markets regulation, the law of mergers and acquisitions, and employment law. The Journal is published four times annually by an organization of second and third year law students at the University of Pennsylvania Law School. The journal is one of six major scholarly journals at the University of Pennsylvania Law School and one of the top five most cited business law journals in the United States.

== History ==
The Journal of Business Law is an expansion of the Journal of Labor and Employment Law, which has published scholarship since 1997. The Journal also provides a forum for scholarly analysis addressing different aspects of business law. The Journal of Business Law is published in four standard issues each year. It has released 21st volumes.

== Member selection ==
Positions on the journal are filled based in part on students' grades during first year of law school and in part on students' performance during a writing competition conducted at the end of each school year. The writing competition has two major parts: an editing portion and a writing portion. During the 20-hour editing portion, contestants are required to correct a sample portion of a fake law review article. Contestants have at their disposal a copy of the Bluebook and a packet of source materials provided by the journal. During the writing portion, contestants are required to create a cohesive, thesis-driven essay using only these source materials. The sources cover a variety of topics, and the essay does not need to be law-related.

== Notable citations ==
In 2013, the Journal was cited in an opinion by the United States Court of Appeals for the Third Circuit. The case In re K.B. Toys, 736 F.3d 247, 249 (3d Cir. 2013), cited Tally M. Wiener & Nicholas B. Malito, On the Nature of the Transferred Bankruptcy Claim, 12 U. Pa. J. Bus. L. 35 (2009).

In 2012, the Journal was cited by both the Delaware Supreme Court and the Maine Supreme Judicial Court. In PHL Variable Ins. Co. v. Price Dawe 2006 Ins. Trust, ex rel. Christiana Bank and Trust Co., 28 A.3d 1059, 1069 n.27, 1070 n.33 (Del. 2012), the Delaware Supreme Court twice cited Susan Lord Martin, Betting on the Lives of Strangers: Life Settlements, STOLI and Securitization, 134 U. Pa. J. Bus. L. 173 (2010). In Fuhrmann v. Staples Office Superstore East, Inc., 58 A.3d 1083, 1095 (Me. 2012), the Maine Supreme Judicial Court cited Mitchell H. Rubinstein, Employees, Employers, and Quasi–Employers: An Analysis of Employees and Employers Who Operate in the Borderland Between an Employer–and–Employee Relationship, 14 U. Pa. J. Bus. L. 605 (2012).

In addition, the Journal has been regularly cited in briefs before the United States Supreme Court in some of the most important business law cases in the last decade, including: Harris v. Quinn, Halliburton v. Erica P. John Fund (Halliburton II), Petrella v. Metro Goldwyn-Mayer, Inc., Amgen Inc. v. Connecticut Retirement Plans & Trust Funds, and Morrison v. National Australia Bank.
