= Major League Baseball Umpires Association =

Labor union of baseball umpires

MLBUA
- Major League Baseball Umpires Association
- Predecessor: Major League Umpires Association
- Founded: 2000; 26 years ago
- Location: United States, Canada
- Members: c. 76
- President: Dan Bellino
- Website: mlbua.com
- Formerly called: World Umpires Association (until 2018)

The Major League Baseball Umpires Association (MLBUA) is an organization of Major League Baseball (MLB) umpires. It was certified by the National Labor Relations Board on February 24, 2000, as the World Umpires Association (WUA) as a bargaining agent. It took over as the bargaining agent for MLB umpires after the 2000 MLB season, replacing the Major League Umpires Association (MLUA), which dated back to 1970, and has since been responsible for defending their personnel since. On July 17, 2018, it rebranded itself as the Major League Baseball Umpires Association.

== Formation ==
The MLUA, led by longtime negotiating attorney Richie Phillips, was decertified by its member umpires (by a vote of 57 to 35) in February 2000, after Phillips' strategy of mass resignations in September 1999 backfired, with MLB simply accepting many of the resignations and promoting new umpires from the minor leagues. The WUA was created immediately afterward. Its first president was working umpire John Hirschbeck, who held the position from 2000 to 2009. He was replaced by Joe West in February 2009.

The formation of the WUA allowed longtime umpires Derryl Cousins and John Shulock to finally join the umpires' union. They were denied membership by the MLUA due to crossing the picket line during the 1979 umpires' strike.

In December 2009, the WUA reached an agreement with MLB on a five-year labor agreement, to run through December 2014 – members of the union voted to ratify the contract in January 2010. A new labor contract was subsequently ratified in January 2015 and ran until the end of 2019.

On July 17, 2018, the union rebranded itself as the Major League Baseball Umpires Association.

In December 2024, it was announced that the union had ratified a new five year collective bargaining agreement following the end of the previous contract signed ahead of the 2020 season.

== Leadership ==
In 2021, Bill Miller (President), Ted Barrett (Vice-President), and Dan Bellino (Secretary/Treasurer) made up the executive board for the union. Will Little, Laz Díaz, Chris Conroy, Chris Guccione, Tom Hallion, and Tim Timmons composed the remainder of the governing body. All members of the governing and executive boards are active umpires. Legal counsel for the union is Altshuler Berzon, LLP of San Francisco, California.

Bellino succeeded Barrett as vice-president and became president ahead of the 2025 MLB season.

=== Presidents ===
- John Hirschbeck (2000–2009)
- Joe West (2009–2018)
- Bill Miller (2019–2025)
- Dan Bellino (2025–present)
