= Major League Umpires Association =

Defunct labor union of baseball umpires

MLUA
- Major League Umpires Association
- Successor: World Umpires Association
- Founded: 1970
- Dissolved: 1999
- Location: United States, Canada
- Members: c. 92
- Key people: Richie Phillips

The Major League Umpires Association (MLUA) was a union for the umpires of both the American League and the National League. It was formed in 1970. It was decertified and replaced by the World Umpires Association (now the Major League Baseball Umpires Association), which became the bargaining agent for MLB umpires before the 2000 season.

== History ==
After a one-day strike by the umpires during the 1970 playoffs (the first games of both the ALCS and NLCS), the union was recognized by both the National and American League presidents. It then proceeded to win several pay raises for the umpires.

Richie Phillips became general counsel and executive director of the MLUA in 1978.

The umpires went on strike again in 1979, making many realize that the game was quite different without the umpires. The MLUA was asking for a package of $520,000 in raises for the 52 umpires. Technically, rather than going on strike, the umpires just did not return their contracts to Major League Baseball. Several people made comments about the replacement umpires, including Phil Niekro, who said: They can be rattled. They don't know how much to take from the players.

On May 1, 1980, Bill Madlock, of the Pittsburgh Pirates, had an argument with umpire Jerry Crawford. He was fined $5,000 and suspended for fifteen days, but he had not served his suspension nor paid his fine by June 3, because of appeals to both the National League president, and the Commissioner of Baseball. Because of that, Phillips threatened to have the umpires eject Madlock from games, if he did not serve his suspension. That threat raised an uproar, with comments from the NL president, the vice-president of the umpires association, and the vice-president of the Pirates.

In 1999, Phillips advocated a strategy of mass resignations in hopes of forcing negotiations for a new collective bargaining agreement. The strategy backfired when Major League Baseball "called their bluff" and accepted most of the resignations, promoting replacement umpires from the minor leagues. Both Phillips, and twenty-two of his umpires were out of jobs. The umpires, led by John Hirschbeck, later voted 57 to 35 to decertify the union, replacing it with the World Umpires Association led by Hirschbeck. The failed attempt has been cited as an example of groupthink in the sports world.

== See also ==
- 1979 Major League Umpires Strike
- 1999 Major League Umpires Association mass resignation
