= Richie Phillips =

American lawyer (1940–2013)

- Born: August 24, 1940; Philadelphia, Pennsylvania, U.S.
- Died: May 31, 2013 (aged 72); Cape May, New Jersey, U.S.
- Education: Villanova University
- Occupations: Lawyer; Executive director of the Major League Umpires Association; Owner of Pilot Freight Services
- Spouse: Ellen Harrell
- Children: 4

Richard Gregory Phillips Sr. (August 24, 1940 – May 31, 2013) was an American lawyer. From 1978 to 2000, he was general counsel and executive director of the Major League Umpires Association (MLUA). He held a similar position for National Basketball Association (NBA) referees. Phillips is notable for recommending that Major League Baseball (MLB) umpires resign en masse in 1999.

== Biography ==
Phillips, the son of a police officer, was born in August 1940 in Philadelphia. He graduated from St. Thomas More High School and received both his undergraduate and law degrees from Villanova University. While in college, he played varsity football and later returned to coach the freshman football team while attending law school. After getting his legal degree in 1966, Phillips worked for one-and-a-half years in the Philadelphia public defender's office. From there, he moved to the district attorney's office as a trial assistant in the organized crime division, and on to the homicide division until around 1971.

Phillips' law office was located in Bala Cynwyd, Pennsylvania. He represented the Transport Workers Union and handled legal matters for the top brass of the Carpenters Union. He also represented about 30 athletes, which he maintained did not present any conflict of interest with his duties relating to sports officials. He also represented former Los Angeles Lakers coach Paul Westhead, a Philadelphia native who played at Saint Joseph's University and coached at La Salle.

In 1996, Phillips became the majority owner of Pilot Freight Services, based in Lima, Pennsylvania. At the time, Pilot Freight was struggling to stay afloat in a sea full of transportation providers. Phillips was able to lead the company to the top of the industry, and by the time he stepped away from day-to-day management of the company, Pilot Freight Services was the largest privately held freight forwarder in the United States. In 2007, Phillips' son Richard Jr. became CEO of the company.

Phillips served as general counsel and executive director of the Major League Umpires Association (MLUA). He recommended that Major League Baseball umpires resign en masse effective September 2, 1999, seeking enhanced benefits for union umpires. This decision ultimately turned out to be devastating to the umpires, as Major League Baseball accepted many of the resignations, terminating their employment and promoting replacement umpires from the minor leagues. The umpires later voted to decertify the union, replacing it with the World Umpires Association.

In 1964, Phillips married Ellen Harrell; they had two sons and two daughters. He died of cardiac arrest at his home in Cape May, New Jersey, at the age of 72 on May 31, 2013.
