= 1975 Boston Red Sox season =

Major League Baseball season

1975 Boston Red Sox
- American League champions American League East champions
- League: American League
- Division: East
- Ballpark: Fenway Park
- City: Boston, Massachusetts
- Record: 95–65 (.594)
- Divisional place: 1st
- Owner: Tom Yawkey
- President: Tom Yawkey
- General manager: Dick O'Connell
- Manager: Darrell Johnson
- Television: WSBK-TV, Ch. 38 (Dick Stockton, Ken Harrelson)
- Radio: WHDH-AM 850 (Ned Martin, Jim Woods)
- Stats: ESPN.com; Baseball Reference

The 1975 Boston Red Sox season was the 75th season in the franchise's Major League Baseball history. The Red Sox finished first in the American League East with a record of 95–65. Following a sweep of the Oakland Athletics in the ALCS, the Red Sox lost the World Series to the Cincinnati Reds in seven games.

== Offseason ==
=== Long expectations ===
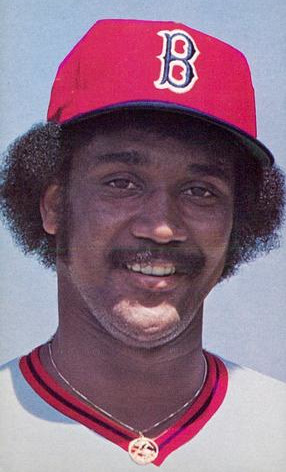
Jim Rice

The 1975 baseball season should have dawned for Red Sox fans with bright hopes. The team had made a legitimate run for the pennant the previous year, and this time the team had Carlton Fisk and Rick Wise for full seasons. Rick Burleson had surprised everyone by playing outstanding shortstop and hitting higher in the majors than he ever had in the minors. In addition, the Sox had two rookies who gave every indication they would be phenoms, Fred Lynn and Jim Rice. But the memory of the collapse of 1974 still hung heavy over New England fans.

At first most of the preseason talk had to do with the decision by Tony Conigliaro to try one more comeback and with the salary hassle concerning Luis Tiant, who felt he deserved more than $70,000 he was earning and wouldn't show up at Winter Haven, Florida, causing team owner Tom Yawkey to meet with "El Tiante", agree on a raise (to $90,000) and get the Sox pitching ace back in camp.

Still, it didn't take too long before the stories and pictures coming out of Florida about the two phenoms got Sox fans thinking. The betting lines in Las Vegas had Boston as a long shot, although not the 100–1 shot they were in 1967. The odds against them went up, however, after Fisk, returning from the serious knee injury of 1974, was hit in the right arm and broke it. Even the positive talk about young Mr. Lynn couldn't drive away the gloom over Fisk's injury. Catching is absolutely vital to a successful team, and Fisk was going to be sidelined for at least a couple of months.

=== Youngsters and comebacks ===
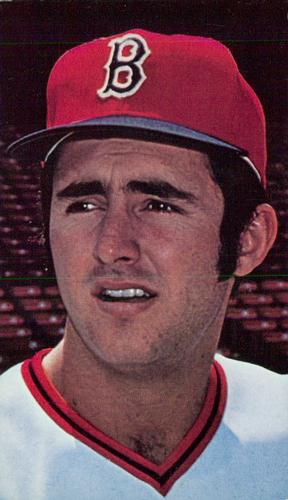
Fred Lynn

The word out of Florida on Lynn was very positive. The young man who had gone to the USC as a football linebacker, but gave up football for baseball, seemed to be doing it all. Not only did he hit and run and field, he was a good-looking, charming young man. He was a hit with Boston and New England fans and hit with power, and with the way big Jim Rice was clobbering the baseball, Boston appeared to have a power punch that could only get better when Fisk got back into the lineup.

Rick Wise, back after a year of shoulder trouble and then a broken finger, looked ready to boost a pitching staff, which already had Luis Tiant, Bill Lee, Reggie Cleveland, and the stringbean flame-thrower Roger Moret. The bullpen also looked strong, with Dick Drago as the closer and hard-thrower Dick Pole and veteran Diego Seguí.

Additionally, the word on Tony Conigliaro was encouraging, and that boosted spirits back home. Carl Yastrzemski was at first base, and after three short trials in previous years Cecil Cooper was going to make this team and probably be the designated hitter.

=== Notable transactions ===
- October 24, 1974: Juan Marichal was released by the Red Sox.
- March 29, 1975: Danny Cater was traded by the Red Sox to the St. Louis Cardinals for Danny Godby.

== Regular season ==
Record by month
Month	Record		Cumulative		AL East		Ref.
Month	Won	Lost	Won	Lost	Position	GB	Ref.
April	7	9	7	9	5th (tie)	3	
May	16	9	23	18	1st	+2 1/2	
June	18	13	41	31	1st	+1	
July	22	11	63	42	1st	+9	
August	16	12	79	54	1st	+6	
September	16	11	95	65	1st	+4 1/2	

The Red Sox played only 160 games, as two games against the Yankees were rained out in the final week of the season, and not rescheduled once Boston clinched the AL East title.

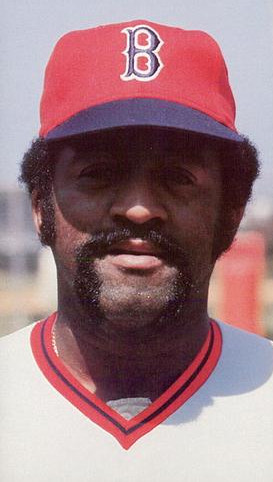
Luis Tiant

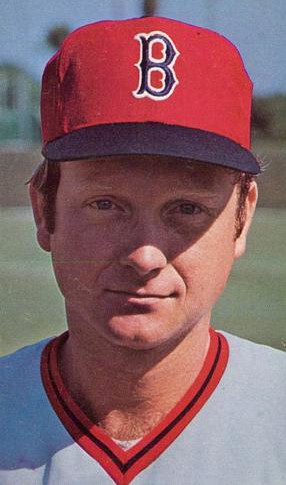
Denny Doyle

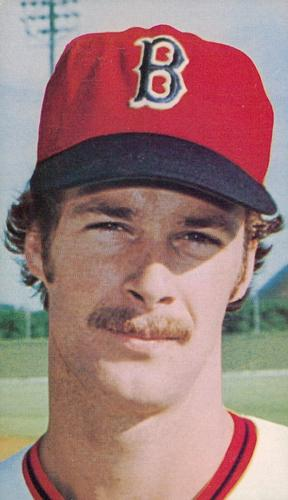
Rick Burleson

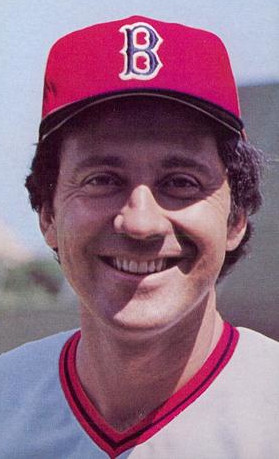
Rico Petrocelli

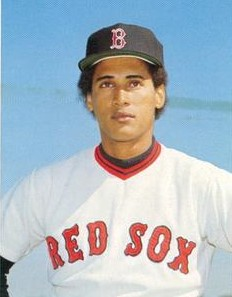
Juan Beníquez

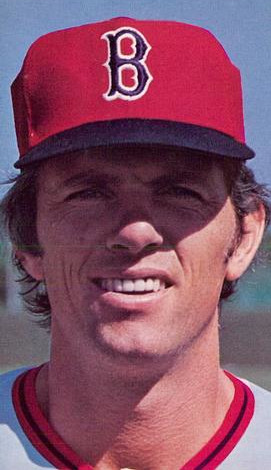
Bill Lee

=== Season standings ===
AL East
Team	W	L	Pct.	GB	Home	Road
Boston Red Sox	95	65	.594	—	47‍–‍34	48‍–‍31
Baltimore Orioles	90	69	.566	4½	44‍–‍33	46‍–‍36
New York Yankees	83	77	.519	12	43‍–‍35	40‍–‍42
Cleveland Indians	79	80	.497	15½	41‍–‍39	38‍–‍41
Milwaukee Brewers	68	94	.420	28	36‍–‍45	32‍–‍49
Detroit Tigers	57	102	.358	37½	31‍–‍49	26‍–‍53

=== Record vs. opponents ===
1975 American League record Sources:
Team	BAL	BOS	CAL	CWS	CLE	DET	KC	MIL	MIN	NYY	OAK	TEX
Baltimore	—	9–9	6–6	7–4	10–8	12–4	7–5	14–4	6–6	8–10	4–8	7–5
Boston	9–9	—	6–6	8–4	7–11	13–5	7–5	10–8	10–2	11–5	6–6	8–4
California	6–6	6–6	—	9–9	3–9	6–5	4–14	7–5	8–10	7–5	7–11	9–9
Chicago	4–7	4–8	9–9	—	7–5	5–7	9–9	8–4	9–9	6–6	9–9	5–13
Cleveland	8–10	11–7	9–3	5–7	—	12–6	6–6	9–9	3–6	9–9	2–10	5–7
Detroit	4–12	5–13	5–6	7–5	6–12	—	6–6	7–11	4–8	6–12	6–6	1–11
Kansas City	5–7	5–7	14–4	9–9	6–6	6–6	—	7–5	11–7	7–5	11–7	14–4
Milwaukee	4–14	8–10	5–7	4–8	9–9	11–7	5–7	—	2–10	9–9	5–7	6–6
Minnesota	6–6	2–10	10–8	9–9	6–3	8–4	7–11	10–2	—	4–8	6–12	8–10
New York	10–8	5–11	5–7	6–6	9–9	12–6	5–7	9–9	8–4	—	6–6	8–4
Oakland	8–4	6–6	11–7	9–9	10–2	6–6	11–7	7–5	12–6	6–6	—	12–6
Texas	5–7	4–8	9–9	13–5	7–5	11–1	4–14	6–6	10–8	4–8	6–12	—

=== Notable transactions ===
- June 3: Dave Schmidt was selected by the Red Sox in the 2nd round of the 1975 Major League Baseball draft
- June 14: The Red Sox traded a player to be named later and cash to the California Angels for Denny Doyle. The Red Sox completed the deal by sending Chuck Ross (minors) to the Angels on March 5, 1976.

=== Opening Day lineup ===
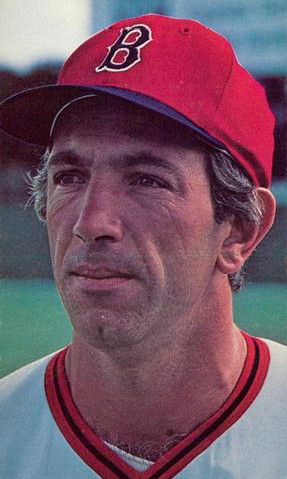
Bob Montgomery

20	Juan Beníquez	LF
19	Fred Lynn	CF
8	Carl Yastrzemski	1B
25	Tony Conigliaro	DH
6	Rico Petrocelli	3B
24	Dwight Evans	RF
10	Bob Montgomery	C
7	Rick Burleson	SS
2	Doug Griffin	2B
23	Luis Tiant	P

Boston's Opening Day opponent was the Milwaukee Brewers, then a member of the AL East; the game was notable for being the first game that Hank Aaron played in the American League, having previously played from 1954 through 1974 in the National League.

=== Roster ===
1975 Boston Red Sox
Roster
Pitchers: 46 Steve Barr; 43 Jim Burton; 26 Reggie Cleveland; 41 Dick Drago; 21 Rick Kreuger; 37 Bill Lee; 29 Roger Moret; 45 Dick Pole; 28 Diego Seguí; 23 Luis Tiant; 38 Jim Willoughby; 40 Rick Wise	Catchers: 39 Tim Blackwell; 27 Carlton Fisk; 33 Tim McCarver; 50 Andy Merchant; 10 Bob Montgomery; Infielders: 11 Kim Andrew; 7 Rick Burleson; 17 Cecil Cooper; 49 Steve Dillard; 15,5 Denny Doyle; 2 Doug Griffin; 12 Bob Heise; 51 Butch Hobson; 5 Buddy Hunter; 15 Deron Johnson; 3 Dick McAuliffe; 6 Rico Petrocelli; 8 Carl Yastrzemski	Outfielders: 20 Juan Beníquez; 1 Bernie Carbo; 24 Dwight Evans; 19 Fred Lynn; 16 Rick Miller; 14 Jim Rice; Other batters: 25 Tony Conigliaro	Manager: 22 Darrell Johnson; Coaches: 31 Don Bryant (Bullpen); 35 Johnny Pesky (First base); 36 Eddie Popowski (Special assignment); 32 Stan Williams (Pitching); 34 Don Zimmer (Third base)

== Game log ==
=== Regular season ===
Legend
	Red Sox win
	Red Sox loss
	Postponement
	Clinched division
**Bold**	Red Sox team member

1975 regular season game log: 95–65 (Home: 47–34; Away: 48–31)
April: 7–9 (Home: 3–5; Away: 4–4)

#	Date	Time (ET)	Opponent	Score	Win	Loss	Save	Time of Game	Attendance	Record	Box/ Streak
3	April 11		@ Orioles								
4	April 12		@ Orioles								
5	April 13		@ Orioles								
8	April 18		Orioles								
—	April 19		Orioles	Postponed (rain); Makeup: June 30							
9	April 20		Orioles								

May: 16–9 (Home: 8–5; Away: 8–4)

#	Date	Time (ET)	Opponent	Score	Win	Loss	Save	Time of Game	Attendance	Record	Box/ Streak
25	May 12	11:01 p.m. EDT	@ Athletics	3–5	Fingers (3–2)	**Seguí** (1–1)	Lindblad (2)	2:01	28,984	14–11	L1
26	May 13	11:01 p.m. EDT	@ Athletics	5–9	Holtzman (2–4)	**Wise** (3–3)	Todd (4)	2:25	4,239	14–12	L2
27	May 15		Royals								
28	May 16		Royals								
29	May 17		Royals								
30	May 18		Royals								
31	May 19	7:31 p.m. EDT	Athletics	10–5	**Tiant** (4–5)	Odom (0–2)	—	2:30	14,700	16–15	W2
32	May 20	7:33 p.m. EDT	Athletics	7–0	**Lee** (5–4)	Blue (8–2)	—	1:51	17,201	17–15	W3
33	May 21	7:32 p.m. EDT	Athletics	7–3	**Cleveland** (3–2)	Holtzman (3–5)	—	1:56	14,665	18–15	W4

June: 18–13 (Home: 8–9; Away: 10–4)

#	Date	Time (ET)	Opponent	Score	Win	Loss	Save	Time of Game	Attendance	Record	Box/ Streak
53 (1)	June 13		@ Royals								
54 (2)	June 13		@ Royals								
55	June 14		@ Royals								
56	June 15		@ Royals								
60	June 20		@ Orioles								
61	June 21		@ Orioles								
62 (1)	June 22		@ Orioles								
63 (2)	June 22		@ Orioles								
71 (1)	June 30		Orioles								
72 (2)	June 30		Orioles								

July: 22–11 (Home: 12–3; Away: 10–8)

#	Date	Time (ET)	Opponent	Score	Win	Loss	Save	Time of Game	Attendance	Record	Box/ Streak
73	July 1		Orioles								
—	July 15	8:30 p.m. EDT	**46th All-Star Game in Milwaukee, WI**								
88	July 17		Royals								
89	July 18		Royals								

August: 16–12 (Home: 7–6; Away: 9–6)

#	Date	Time (ET)	Opponent	Score	Win	Loss	Save	Time of Game	Attendance	Record	Box/ Streak
113	August 8	11:06 p.m. EDT	@ Athletics	2–3	Holtzman (14–9)	**Cleveland** (9–8)	Fingers (15)	1:39	20,575	68–45	L1
114	August 9	4:37 p.m. EDT	@ Athletics	7–2	**Lee** (15–6)	Siebert (2–3)	—	2:31	16,828	69–45	W1
115	August 10	4:37 p.m. EDT	@ Athletics	5–3	**Tiant** (14–11)	Bosman (7–4)	**Willoughby** (7)	2:20	18,806	70–45	W2
116	August 11	11:02 p.m. EDT	@ Athletics	3–4	Blue (16–8)	**Moret** (8–2)	Todd (8)	2:50	46,376	70–46	L1
124	August 19		@ Royals								
125	August 20		@ Royals								
131	August 29	7:35 p.m. EDT	Athletics	6–1	**Wise** (17–8)	Bahnsen (9–12)	—	2:39	34,341	79–52	W2
132	August 30	7:36 p.m. EDT	Athletics	6–7 (10)	Fingers (9–6)	**Drago** (1–2)	—	3:22	28,171	79–53	L1
133	August 31	2:07 p.m. EDT	Athletics	6–8	Fingers (10–6)	**Seguí** (2–5)	—	3:49	32,753	79–54	L2

September: 16–11 (Home: 9–6; Away: 7–5)

#	Date	Time (ET)	Opponent	Score	Win	Loss	Save	Time of Game	Attendance	Record	Box/ Streak
136	September 3		@ Orioles								
137	September 4		@ Orioles								
151	September 16		Orioles								
152	September 17		Orioles								

=== Detailed records ===
**American League**
Opponent	Home	Away	Total	Pct.	Runs scored	Runs allowed
**AL East**
Baltimore Orioles	3–6	6–3	9–9	.500	69	82
**Boston Red Sox**	—	—	—	—	—	—
Cleveland Indians
Detroit Tigers
Milwaukee Brewers
New York Yankees
	**3–6**	**6–3**	**9–9**	**.500**	**69**	**82**
**AL West**
California Angels
Chicago White Sox
Kansas City Royals
Minnesota Twins
Oakland Athletics	4–2	2–4	6–6	.500	67	50
Texas Rangers
	**4–2**	**2–4**	**6–6**	**.500**	**67**	**50**
	**7–8**	**8–7**	**15–15**	**.500**	**136**	**132**

==== Month-by-Month ====
Month	Games	Won	Lost	Win %	RS	RA
April	16	7	9	0.400	66	84
May	25	16	9	0.640	126	89
June	31	18	13	0.581	172	166
July	33	22	11	0.667	176	150
August	28	16	12	0.571	127	107
September	27	16	11	0.593	129	113
Total	160	95	65	0.594	796	509

	Games	Won	Lost	Win %	RS	RA
Home	81	47	34	0.580	427	399
Road	79	46	31	0.597	369	310
Total	160	95	65	0.594	796	709

=== Composite Box ===
1975 Boston Red Sox Inning–by–Inning Boxscore
Team	1	2	3	4	5	6	7	8	9	10	11	12	13	14	R	H	E
Opponents	71	62	92	93	80	63	92	92	59	5	0	0	0	0	709	1463	17
Red Sox	115	100	102	87	82	78	81	73	65	3	1	6	1	2	796	1500	139

=== Postseason game log ===
Legend
	Red Sox win
	Red Sox loss
	Postponement
**Bold**	Red Sox team member

1975 Postseason game log: 6–4 (Home: 3–2; Away: 3–2)
AL Championship Series vs. Oakland Athletics 3–0 (Home: 2–0; Away: 1–0)

#	Date	Time (ET)	Opponent	Score	Win	Loss	Save	Time of Game	Attendance	Series	Box/ Streak
1	October 4	1:00 p.m. EDT	Athletics	7–1	**Tiant** (1–0)	Holtzman (0–1)	—	2:40	35,578	BOS 1–0	W1
2	October 5	4:00 p.m. EDT	Athletics	6–2	**Moret** (1–0)	Fingers (0–1)	**Drago** (1)	2:27	35,578	BOS 2–0	W2
3	October 7	8:15 p.m. EDT	@ Athletics	5–3	**Wise** (1–0)	Holtzman (0–2)	**Drago** (2)	2:30	49,358	BOS 3–0	W3

World Series vs. Cincinnati Reds 3–4 (Home: 2–2; Away: 1–2)

#	Date	Time (ET)	Opponent	Score	Win	Loss	Save	Time of Game	Attendance	Series	Box/ Streak
1	October 11	1:00 p.m. EDT	Reds	6–0	**Tiant** (1–0)	Gullett (0–1)	—	2:27	35,205	BOS 1–0	W1
2	October 12	1:00 p.m. EDT	Reds	2–3	Eastwick (1–0)	**Drago** (0–1)	—	2:38	35,205	TIE 1–1	L1
3	October 14	8:30 p.m. EDT	@ Reds	5–6 (10)	Eastwick (2–0)	**Willoughby** (0–1)	—	3:03	55,392	CIN 2–1	L2
4	October 15	8:30 p.m. EDT	@ Reds	5–4	**Tiant** (2–0)	Norman (0–1)	—	2:52	55,667	TIE 2–2	W1
5	October 16	8:30 p.m. EDT	@ Reds	2–6	Gullett (1–1)	**Cleveland** (0–1)	Eastwick (1)	2:23	56,393	CIN 3–2	L1
—	October 18	1:00 p.m. EDT	Reds	Postponed (rain); Makeup: October 21							
—	October 19	1:00 p.m. EDT	Reds	Postponed (rain); Makeup: October 21							
—	October 20	8:15 p.m. EDT	Reds	Postponed (rain); Makeup: October 21							
6	October 21	8:15 p.m. EDT	Reds	7–6 (12)	**Wise** (1–0)	Darcy (0–1)	—	4:01	35,205	TIE 3–3	W1
7	October 22	8:15 p.m. EDT	Reds	3–4	C. Carroll (1–0)	**Burton** (0–1)	McEnaney (1)	2:52	35,205	CIN 4–3	L1

== Starting Lineups ==
=== Regular Season ===
==== Batting Order ====
1975 Regular Season Batting Order game log
April

#	Date	Opponent	1st	2nd	3rd	4th	5th	6th	7th	8th	9th
3	April 11	@ BAL									
4	April 12	@ BAL									
5	April 13	@ BAL									
8	April 18	BAL									
9	April 20	BAL									

May

#	Date	Opponent	1st	2nd	3rd	4th	5th	6th	7th	8th	9th
25	May 12	@ OAK	#20; Beníquez (CF)	#7; Burleson (SS)	#8; Yastrzemski (1B)	#14; Rice (LF)	#6; Petrocelli (3B)	#24; Evans (RF)	#25; Conigliaro (DH)	#10; Montgomery (C)	#2; Griffin (2B)
26	May 13	@ OAK	#16; Miller (LF)	#7; Burleson (SS)	#8; Yastrzemski (1B)	#19; Lynn (CF)	#6; Petrocelli (3B)	#1; Carbo (DH)	#24; Evans (RF)	#2; Griffin (2B)	#39; Blackwell (C)
31	May 19	OAK	#20; Beníquez (CF)	#7; Burleson (SS)	#8; Yastrzemski (1B)	#14; Rice (LF)	#24; Evans (RF)	#25; Conigliaro (DH)	#6; Petrocelli (3B)	#10; Montgomery (C)	#2; Griffin (2B)
32	May 20	OAK	#2; Griffin (2B)	#7; Burleson (SS)	#8; Yastrzemski (1B)	#14; Rice (LF)	#24; Evans (RF)	#6; Petrocelli (3B)	#25; Conigliaro (DH)	#10; Montgomery (C)	#19; Lynn (CF)
33	May 21	OAK	#20; Beníquez (CF)	#7; Burleson (SS)	#8; Yastrzemski (1B)	#14; Rice (LF)	#24; Evans (RF)	#25; Conigliaro (DH)	#6; Petrocelli (3B)	#10; Montgomery (C)	#2; Griffin (2B)

June

#	Date	Opponent	1st	2nd	3rd	4th	5th	6th	7th	8th	9th
60	June 20	@ BAL									
61	June 21	@ BAL									
62	June 22	@ BAL									
63	June 22	@ BAL									
71	June 30	BAL									
72	June 30	BAL									

July

#	Date	Opponent	1st	2nd	3rd	4th	5th	6th	7th	8th	9th
73	July 1	BAL									

August

#	Date	Opponent	1st	2nd	3rd	4th	5th	6th	7th	8th	9th
109	August 4	BAL									
110	August 5	BAL									
113	August 8	@ OAK	#20; Beníquez (DH)	#7; Burleson (SS)	#19; Lynn (CF)	#14; Rice (LF)	#24; Evans (RF)	#27; Fisk (C)	#6; Petrocelli (3B)	#2; Griffin (2B)	#17; Cooper (1B)
114	August 9	@ OAK	#1; Carbo (DH)	#5; Doyle (2B)	#17; Cooper (1B)	#19; Lynn (CF)	#14; Rice (LF)	#27; Fisk (C)	#24; Evans (RF)	#6; Petrocelli (3B)	#7; Burleson (SS)
115	August 10	@ OAK	#1; Carbo (DH)	#5; Doyle (2B)	#17; Cooper (1B)	#19; Lynn (CF)	#14; Rice (LF)	#27; Fisk (C)	#24; Evans (RF)	#6; Petrocelli (3B)	#7; Burleson (SS)
116	August 11	@ OAK	#20; Beníquez (DH)	#2; Griffin (2B)	#19; Lynn (CF)	#14; Rice (LF)	#27; Fisk (C)	#24; Evans (RF)	#6; Petrocelli (3B)	#7; Burleson (SS)	#17; Cooper (1B)
131	August 29	OAK	#17; Cooper (DH)	#5; Doyle (2B)	#8; Yastrzemski (1B)	#19; Lynn (CF)	#14; Rice (LF)	#24; Evans (RF)	#7; Burleson (SS)	#3; McAuliffe (3B)	#39; Blackwell (C)
132	August 30	OAK	#17; Cooper (DH)	#5; Doyle (2B)	#8; Yastrzemski (1B)	#19; Lynn (CF)	#14; Rice (LF)	#24; Evans (RF)	#7; Burleson (SS)	#3; McAuliffe (3B)	#39; Blackwell (C)
133	August 31	OAK	#17; Cooper (DH)	#5; Doyle (2B)	#8; Yastrzemski (1B)	#19; Lynn (CF)	#14; Rice (LF)	#24; Evans (RF)	#7; Burleson (SS)	#3; McAuliffe (3B)	#39; Blackwell (C)

September

#	Date	Opponent	1st	2nd	3rd	4th	5th	6th	7th	8th	9th
136	September 3	@ BAL									
137	September 4	@ BAL									
151	September 16	BAL									
152	September 17	BAL									

==== Defensive Lineup ====
1975 Regular Season Defensive Lineup game log
April

#	Date	Opponent	C	1B	2B	3B	SS	LF	CF	RF	P
3	April 11	@ BAL									
4	April 12	@ BAL									
5	April 13	@ BAL									
8	April 18	BAL									
9	April 20	BAL									

May

#	Date	Opponent	C	1B	2B	3B	SS	LF	CF	RF	P
25	May 12	@ OAK	#10; Montgomery	#8; Yastrzemski	#2; Griffin	#6; Petrocelli	#7; Burleson	#14; Rice	#20; Beníquez	#24; Evans	#26; Cleveland
26	May 13	@ OAK	#39; Blackwell	#8; Yastrzemski	#2; Griffin	#6; Petrocelli	#7; Burleson	#16; Miller	#19; Lynn	#24; Evans	#40; Wise
31	May 19	OAK	#10; Montgomery	#8; Yastrzemski	#2; Griffin	#6; Petrocelli	#7; Burleson	#14; Rice	#20; Beníquez	#24; Evans	#23; Tiant
32	May 20	OAK	#10; Montgomery	#8; Yastrzemski	#2; Griffin	#6; Petrocelli	#7; Burleson	#14; Rice	#19; Lynn	#24; Evans	#37; Lee
33	May 21	OAK	#10; Montgomery	#8; Yastrzemski	#2; Griffin	#6; Petrocelli	#7; Burleson	#14; Rice	#20; Beníquez	#24; Evans	#26; Cleveland

June

#	Date	Opponent	C	1B	2B	3B	SS	LF	CF	RF	P
60	June 20	@ BAL									
61	June 21	@ BAL									
62	June 22	@ BAL									
63	June 22	@ BAL									
71	June 30	BAL									
72	June 30	BAL									

July

#	Date	Opponent	C	1B	2B	3B	SS	LF	CF	RF	P
73	July 1	BAL									

August

#	Date	Opponent	C	1B	2B	3B	SS	LF	CF	RF	P
109	August 4	BAL									
110	August 5	BAL									
113	August 8	@ OAK	#27; Fisk	#17; Cooper	#2; Griffin	#6; Petrocelli	#7; Burleson	#14; Rice	#19; Lynn	#24; Evans	#26; Cleveland
114	August 9	@ OAK	#27; Fisk	#17; Cooper	#5; Doyle	#6; Petrocelli	#7; Burleson	#14; Rice	#19; Lynn	#24; Evans	#37; Lee
115	August 10	@ OAK	#27; Fisk	#17; Cooper	#5; Doyle	#6; Petrocelli	#7; Burleson	#14; Rice	#19; Lynn	#24; Evans	#23; Tiant
116	August 11	@ OAK	#27; Fisk	#17; Cooper	#2; Griffin	#6; Petrocelli	#7; Burleson	#14; Rice	#19; Lynn	#24; Evans	#29; Moret
131	August 29	OAK	#39; Blackwell	#8; Yastrzemski	#5; Doyle	#3; McAuliffe	#7; Burleson	#14; Rice	#19; Lynn	#24; Evans	#40; Wise
132	August 30	OAK	#39; Blackwell	#8; Yastrzemski	#5; Doyle	#3; McAuliffe	#7; Burleson	#14; Rice	#19; Lynn	#24; Evans	#23; Tiant
133	August 31	OAK	#39; Blackwell	#8; Yastrzemski	#5; Doyle	#3; McAuliffe	#7; Burleson	#14; Rice	#19; Lynn	#24; Evans	#37; Lee

September

#	Date	Opponent	C	1B	2B	3B	SS	LF	CF	RF	P
136	September 3	@ BAL									
137	September 4	@ BAL									
151	September 16	BAL									
152	September 17	BAL									

=== Postseason ===
==== Batting Order ====
1975 Postseason Batting Order game log
AL Championship Series vs. Oakland Athletics

#	Date	Opponent	1st	2nd	3rd	4th	5th	6th	7th	8th	9th
1	October 4	OAK	#20; Beníquez (DH)	#5; Doyle (2B)	#8; Yastrzemski (LF)	#27; Fisk (C)	#19; Lynn (CF)	#6; Petrocelli (3B)	#24; Evans (RF)	#17; Cooper (1B)	#7; Burleson (SS)
2	October 5	OAK	#20; Beníquez (DH)	#5; Doyle (2B)	#8; Yastrzemski (LF)	#27; Fisk (C)	#19; Lynn (CF)	#6; Petrocelli (3B)	#24; Evans (RF)	#17; Cooper (1B)	#7; Burleson (SS)
3	October 7	@ OAK	#20; Beníquez (DH)	#5; Doyle (2B)	#8; Yastrzemski (LF)	#27; Fisk (C)	#19; Lynn (CF)	#6; Petrocelli (3B)	#24; Evans (RF)	#17; Cooper (1B)	#7; Burleson (SS)

World Series vs. Cincinnati Reds

#	Date	Opponent	1st	2nd	3rd	4th	5th	6th	7th	8th	9th
1	October 11	CIN	#24; Evans (RF)	#5; Doyle (2B)	#8; Yastrzemski (LF)	#27; Fisk (C)	#19; Lynn (CF)	#6; Petrocelli (3B)	#7; Burleson (SS)	#17; Cooper (1B)	#23; Tiant (SP)
2	October 12	CIN	#17; Cooper (1B)	#5; Doyle (2B)	#8; Yastrzemski (LF)	#27; Fisk (C)	#19; Lynn (CF)	#6; Petrocelli (3B)	#24; Evans (RF)	#7; Burleson (SS)	#37; Lee (SP)
3	October 14	@ CIN	#17; Cooper (1B)	#5; Doyle (2B)	#8; Yastrzemski (LF)	#27; Fisk (C)	#19; Lynn (CF)	#6; Petrocelli (3B)	#24; Evans (RF)	#7; Burleson (SS)	#40; Wise (SP)
4	October 15	@ CIN	#20; Beníquez (LF)	#5; Doyle (2B)	#8; Yastrzemski (1B)	#27; Fisk (C)	#19; Lynn (CF)	#6; Petrocelli (3B)	#24; Evans (RF)	#7; Burleson (SS)	#23; Tiant (SP)
5	October 16	@ CIN	#20; Beníquez (LF)	#5; Doyle (2B)	#8; Yastrzemski (1B)	#27; Fisk (C)	#19; Lynn (CF)	#6; Petrocelli (3B)	#24; Evans (RF)	#7; Burleson (SS)	#26; Cleveland (SP)
6	October 21	CIN	#17; Cooper (1B)	#5; Doyle (2B)	#8; Yastrzemski (LF)	#27; Fisk (C)	#19; Lynn (CF)	#6; Petrocelli (3B)	#24; Evans (RF)	#7; Burleson (SS)	#23; Tiant (SP)
7	October 22	CIN	#1; Carbo (LF)	#5; Doyle (2B)	#8; Yastrzemski (1B)	#27; Fisk (C)	#19; Lynn (CF)	#6; Petrocelli (3B)	#24; Evans (RF)	#7; Burleson (SS)	#37; Lee (SP)

==== Defensive Lineup ====
1975 Postseason Defensive Lineup game log
AL Championship Series vs. Oakland Athletics

#	Date	Opponent	C	1B	2B	3B	SS	LF	CF	RF	P
1	October 4	OAK	#27; Fisk	#17; Cooper	#5; Doyle	#6; Petrocelli	#7; Burleson	#8; Yastrzemski	#19; Lynn	#24; Evans	#23; Tiant
2	October 5	OAK	#27; Fisk	#17; Cooper	#5; Doyle	#6; Petrocelli	#7; Burleson	#8; Yastrzemski	#19; Lynn	#24; Evans	#26; Cleveland
3	October 7	@ OAK	#27; Fisk	#17; Cooper	#5; Doyle	#6; Petrocelli	#7; Burleson	#8; Yastrzemski	#19; Lynn	#24; Evans	#40; Wise

World Series vs. Cincinnati Reds

#	Date	Opponent	C	1B	2B	3B	SS	LF	CF	RF	P
1	October 11	CIN	#27; Fisk	#17; Cooper	#5; Doyle	#6; Petrocelli	#7; Burleson	#8; Yastrzemski	#19; Lynn	#24; Evans	#23; Tiant
2	October 12	CIN	#27; Fisk	#17; Cooper	#5; Doyle	#6; Petrocelli	#7; Burleson	#8; Yastrzemski	#19; Lynn	#24; Evans	#37; Lee
3	October 14	@ CIN	#27; Fisk	#17; Cooper	#5; Doyle	#6; Petrocelli	#7; Burleson	#8; Yastrzemski	#19; Lynn	#24; Evans	#40; Wise
4	October 15	@ CIN	#27; Fisk	#8; Yastrzemski	#5; Doyle	#6; Petrocelli	#7; Burleson	#20; Beníquez	#19; Lynn	#24; Evans	#23; Tiant
5	October 16	@ CIN	#27; Fisk	#8; Yastrzemski	#5; Doyle	#6; Petrocelli	#7; Burleson	#20; Beníquez	#19; Lynn	#24; Evans	#26; Cleveland
6	October 21	CIN	#27; Fisk	#17; Cooper	#5; Doyle	#6; Petrocelli	#7; Burleson	#8; Yastrzemski	#19; Lynn	#24; Evans	#23; Tiant
7	October 22	CIN	#27; Fisk	#8; Yastrzemski	#5; Doyle	#6; Petrocelli	#7; Burleson	#1; Carbo	#19; Lynn	#24; Evans	#37; Lee

== Game Umpires ==
=== Regular Season ===
1975 Regular Season Umpire game log
April

#	Date	Opponent	HP	1B	2B	3B
3	April 11	@ BAL				
4	April 12	@ BAL				
5	April 13	@ BAL				
8	April 18	BAL				
9	April 20	BAL				

May

#	Date	Opponent	HP	1B	2B	3B
25	May 12	@ OAK	Larry Barnett	Hank Morgenweck	Marty Springstead (crew chief)	Don Denkinger
26	May 13	@ OAK	Hank Morgenweck	Marty Springstead (crew chief)	Don Denkinger	Larry Barnett
31	May 19	OAK	George Maloney	Bill Deegan	Russ Goetz (crew chief)	Merle Anthony
32	May 20	OAK	Bill Deegan	Russ Goetz (crew chief)	Merle Anthony	George Maloney
33	May 21	OAK	Russ Goetz (crew chief)	Merle Anthony	George Maloney	Bill Deegan

June

#	Date	Opponent	HP	1B	2B	3B
60	June 20	@ BAL				
61	June 21	@ BAL				
62	June 22	@ BAL				
63	June 22	@ BAL				
71	June 30	BAL				
72	June 30	BAL				

July

#	Date	Opponent	HP	1B	2B	3B
73	July 1	BAL				

August

#	Date	Opponent	HP	1B	2B	3B
109	August 4	BAL				
110	August 5	BAL				
113	August 8	@ OAK	Terry Cooney	Nestor Chylak (crew chief)	Larry McCoy	Joe Brinkman
114	August 9	@ OAK	Nestor Chylak (crew chief)	Larry McCoy	Joe Brinkman	Terry Cooney
115	August 10	@ OAK	Larry McCoy	Joe Brinkman	Terry Cooney	Nestor Chylak (crew chief)
116	August 11	@ OAK	Joe Brinkman	Terry Cooney	Nestor Chylak (crew chief)	Larry McCoy
131	August 29	OAK	Ron Luciano	Armando Rodríguez	Bill Haller (crew chief)	Rich Garcia
132	August 30	OAK	Armando Rodríguez	Bill Haller (crew chief)	Rich Garcia	Ron Luciano
133	August 31	OAK	Bill Haller (crew chief)	Rich Garcia	Ron Luciano	Armando Rodríguez

September

#	Date	Opponent	HP	1B	2B	3B
136	September 3	@ BAL				
137	September 4	@ BAL				
151	September 16	BAL				
152	September 17	BAL				

=== Postseason ===
1975 Postseason Umpire game log
AL Championship Series vs. Oakland Athletics

#	Date	Opponent	HP	1B	2B	3B	LF	RF
1	October 4	OAK	Don Denkinger	Lou DiMuro	Bill Kunkel (crew chief)	Ron Luciano	Jim Evans	Hank Morgenweck
2	October 5	OAK	Lou DiMuro	Bill Kunkel (crew chief)	Ron Luciano	Jim Evans	Hank Morgenweck	Don Denkinger
3	October 7	@ OAK	Bill Kunkel (crew chief)	Ron Luciano	Jim Evans	Hank Morgenweck	Don Denkinger	Lou DiMuro

World Series vs. Cincinnati Reds

#	Date	Opponent	HP	1B	2B	3B	LF	RF
1	October 11	CIN	Art Frantz (AL) (crew chief)	#1; Nick Colosi (NL)	Larry Barnett (AL)	#18; Dick Stello (NL)	George Maloney (AL)	#4; Satch Davidson (NL)
2	October 12	CIN	#1; Nick Colosi (NL)	Larry Barnett (AL)	#18; Dick Stello (NL)	George Maloney (AL)	#4; Satch Davidson (NL)	Art Frantz (AL) (crew chief)
3	October 14	@ CIN	Larry Barnett (AL)	#18; Dick Stello (NL)	George Maloney (AL)	#4; Satch Davidson (NL)	Art Frantz (AL) (crew chief)	#1; Nick Colosi (NL)
4	October 15	@ CIN	#18; Dick Stello (NL)	George Maloney (AL)	#4; Satch Davidson (NL)	Art Frantz (AL) (crew chief)	#1; Nick Colosi (NL)	Larry Barnett (AL)
5	October 16	@ CIN	George Maloney (AL)|	#4; Satch Davidson (NL)	Art Frantz (AL) (crew chief)	#1; Nick Colosi (NL)	Larry Barnett (AL)	#18; Dick Stello (NL)
6	October 21	CIN	#4; Satch Davidson (NL)	Art Frantz (AL) (crew chief)	#1; Nick Colosi (NL)	Larry Barnett (AL)	#18; Dick Stello (NL)	George Maloney (AL)
7	October 22	CIN	Art Frantz (AL) (crew chief)	#1; Nick Colosi (NL)	Larry Barnett (AL)	#18; Dick Stello (NL)	George Maloney (AL)	#4; Satch Davidson (NL)

== Player stats ==
=== Batting ===
==== Starters by position ====
Note: Pos = Position; G = Games played; AB = At bats; H = Hits; Avg. = Batting average; HR = Home runs; RBI = Runs batted in

Pos	Player	G	AB	H	Avg.	HR	RBI
C	Carlton Fisk	79	263	87	.331	10	52
1B	Carl Yastrzemski	149	543	146	.269	14	60
2B	Doug Griffin	100	287	69	.240	1	29
SS	Rick Burleson	158	580	146	.252	6	62
3B	Rico Petrocelli	115	402	96	.239	7	59
LF	Jim Rice	144	564	174	.309	22	102
CF	Fred Lynn	145	528	175	.331	21	105
RF	Dwight Evans	128	412	113	.274	13	56
DH	Cecil Cooper	106	305	95	.311	14	44

==== Other batters ====
Note: G = Games played; AB = At bats; H = Hits; Avg. = Batting average; HR = Home runs; RBI = Runs batted in

Player	G	AB	H	Avg.	HR	RBI
Bernie Carbo	107	319	82	.257	15	50
Denny Doyle	89	310	96	.310	4	36
Juan Beníquez	78	254	74	.291	2	17
Bob Montgomery	62	195	44	.226	2	26
Tim Blackwell	59	132	26	.197	0	6
Bob Heise	63	126	27	.214	0	21
Rick Miller	77	108	21	.194	0	15
Tony Conigliaro	21	57	7	.123	2	9
Tim McCarver	12	21	8	.381	0	3
Dick McAuliffe	7	15	2	.133	0	1
Deron Johnson	3	10	6	.600	1	3
Steve Dillard	1	5	2	.400	0	0
Andy Merchant	1	4	2	.500	0	0
Butch Hobson	2	4	1	.250	0	0
Kim Andrew	2	2	1	.500	0	0
Buddy Hunter	1	1	0	.000	0	0

=== Pitching ===
==== Starting pitchers ====
Note: G = Games pitched; IP = Innings pitched; W = Wins; L = Losses; ERA = Earned run average; SO = Strikeouts

Player	G	IP	W	L	ERA	SO
Bill Lee	41	260.0	17	9	3.95	78
Luis Tiant	35	260.0	18	14	4.02	142
Rick Wise	35	255.1	19	12	3.95	141

==== Other pitchers ====
Note: G = Games pitched; IP = Innings pitched; W = Wins; L = Losses; ERA = Earned run average; SO = Strikeouts

Player	G	IP	W	L	ERA	SO
Reggie Cleveland	31	170.0	13	9	4.43	78
Roger Moret	36	145.0	14	3	3.60	80
Dick Pole	18	89.2	4	6	4.42	42
Steve Barr	3	7.0	0	1	2.57	2

==== Relief pitchers ====
Note: G = Games pitched; W = Wins; L = Losses; SV = Saves; ERA = Earned run average; SO = Strikeouts

Player	G	W	L	SV	ERA	SO
Dick Drago	40	2	2	15	3.84	43
Diego Segui	33	2	5	6	4.82	45
Jim Burton	29	1	2	1	2.89	39
Jim Willoughby	24	5	2	8	3.54	29
Rick Kreuger	2	0	0	0	4.50	1

== Postseason ==
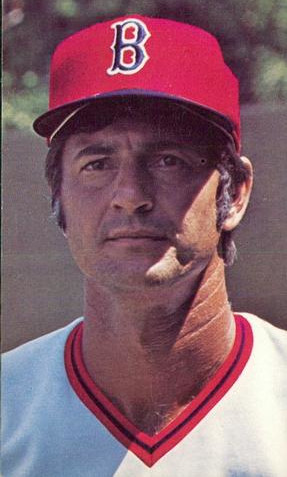
Carl Yastrzemski

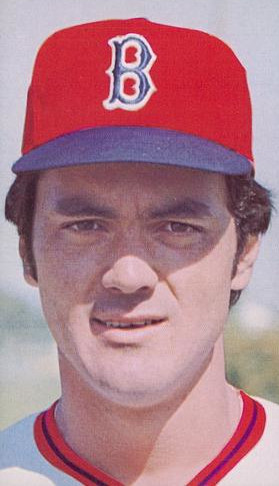
Dwight Evans

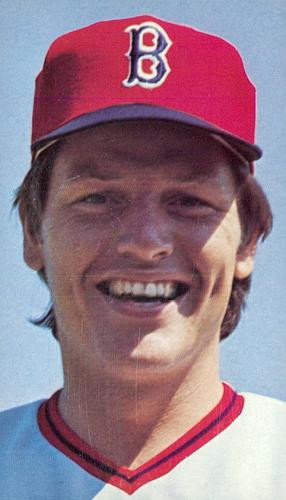
Carlton Fisk

After a great season, The Red Sox continued by sweeping the Oakland Athletics in three games in the American League Championship Series to advance to their first World Series since 1967.

In the historic World Series that followed, it came down to Carl Yastrzemski with the Red Sox trailing, 4–3, with two outs in the ninth inning of Game 7. Yaz's drive fell into the hands of Reds outfielder César Gerónimo, and Boston's magical season fell one game short. Boston would not return to the World Series until 1986.

=== ALCS ===
==== Game 1 ====
October 4 at Fenway Park

Team	1	2	3	4	5	6	7	8	9	R	H	E
Oakland	0	0	0	0	0	0	0	1	0	1	3	4
Boston	2	0	0	0	0	0	5	0	X	7	8	3
W: Luis Tiant (1–0) L: Ken Holtzman (0–1)
HR: None

==== Game 2 ====
October 5 at Fenway Park

Team	1	2	3	4	5	6	7	8	9	R	H	E
Oakland	2	0	0	1	0	0	0	0	0	3	10	0
Boston	0	0	0	3	0	1	1	1	X	6	12	0
W: Roger Moret (1–0) L: Rollie Fingers (0–1) S: Dick Drago (1)
HR: OAK: Reggie Jackson (1) BOS: Carl Yastrzemski (1), Rico Petrocelli (1)

==== Game 3 ====
Team	1	2	3	4	5	6	7	8	9	R	H	E
Boston	0	0	0	1	3	0	0	1	0	5	11	1
Oakland	0	0	0	0	0	1	0	2	0	3	6	1
W: Rick Wise (1–0) L: Ken Holtzman (0–2) S: Dick Drago (2)
HR: None

=== World Series ===
The Red Sox scored first in six of the seven World Series games, only to see the Reds come back and win four of those games, spoiling Boston's chances at their first championship since 1918. In Game 7, the Red Sox entered the sixth inning with a 3–0 lead, but the Reds rallied back to win the game, 4–3, and the series.

NL Cincinnati Reds (4) vs. AL Boston Red Sox (3)
Game	Score	Date	Location	Attendance	Time of Game
1	Reds – 0, Red Sox – 6	October 11	Fenway Park	35,205	2:27
2	Reds – 3, Red Sox – 2	October 12	Fenway Park	35,205	2:38
3	Red Sox – 5, Reds – 6 (10)	October 14	Riverfront Stadium	55,392	3:03
4	Red Sox – 5, Reds – 4	October 15	Riverfront Stadium	55,667	2:52
5	Red Sox – 2, Reds – 6	October 16	Riverfront Stadium	56,393	2:23
6	Reds – 6, Red Sox – 7 (12)	October 21	Fenway Park	35,205	4:01
7	Reds – 4, Red Sox – 3	October 22	Fenway Park	35,205	2:52

== Awards and honors ==
- Darrell Johnson – Associated Press AL Manager of the Year
- Fred Lynn – American League MVP, American League Rookie of the Year, Associated Press Athlete of the Year, Gold Glove Award (OF), AL Player of the Month (June)
- Luis Tiant – Babe Ruth Award

All-Star Game

- Fred Lynn, reserve OF
- Carl Yastrzemski, reserve 1B

== Farm system ==
Level	Team	League	Manager
AAA	Pawtucket Red Sox	International League	Joe Morgan
AA	Bristol Red Sox	Eastern League	Dick McAuliffe and Bill Slack
A	Winston-Salem Red Sox	Carolina League	John Kennedy
A	Winter Haven Red Sox	Florida State League	Rac Slider
A-Short Season	Elmira Red Sox	New York–Penn League	Dick Berardino

LEAGUE CHAMPIONS: Bristol
