= 1974 Boston Red Sox season =

Major League Baseball season

1974 Boston Red Sox
- League: American League
- Division: East
- Ballpark: Fenway Park
- City: Boston, Massachusetts
- Record: 84–78 (.519)
- Divisional place: 3rd
- Owner: Tom Yawkey
- President: Tom Yawkey
- General manager: Dick O'Connell
- Manager: Darrell Johnson
- Television: WBZ-TV, Ch. 4 (Ken Coleman, Johnny Pesky)
- Radio: WHDH-AM 850 (Ned Martin, Jim Woods)
- Stats: ESPN.com; Baseball Reference

The 1974 Boston Red Sox season was the 74th season in the franchise's Major League Baseball history. The Red Sox finished third in the American League East with a record of 84 wins and 78 losses, seven games behind the Baltimore Orioles.

== Offseason ==
- October 24, 1973: Marty Pattin was traded by the Red Sox to the Kansas City Royals for Dick Drago.
- October 26, 1973: Reggie Smith was traded by the Red Sox with Ken Tatum to the St. Louis Cardinals for Bernie Carbo and Rick Wise.
- December 7, 1973: Juan Marichal was purchased by the Red Sox from the San Francisco Giants.
- December 7, 1973: Lynn McGlothen, John Curtis, and Mike Garman were traded by the Red Sox to the St. Louis Cardinals for Diego Seguí, Reggie Cleveland and Terry Hughes.
- March 26, 1974: Orlando Cepeda was released by the Red Sox.

== Regular season ==
Record by month
Month	Record		Cumulative		AL East		Ref.
Month	Won	Lost	Won	Lost	Position	GB	Ref.
April	10	12	10	12	6th	2 1/2	
May	15	10	25	22	2nd	1/2	
June	16	10	41	32	1st	+2 1/2	
July	14	15	55	47	1st	+2 1/2	
August	17	12	72	59	1st	+3	
September	11	18	83	77	3rd	6	
October	1	1	84	78	3rd	7	

=== Season summary ===
==== The injury bug struck Boston ====
Two calamities befell the Red Sox in 1974, and they would work to make the year a disappointing one and let the team get the nickname of "chokers". First Carlton Fisk, who appeared to be ready for greatness, tore up his left knee while blocking the plate in a June 28 game against the Cleveland Indians at Cleveland. He had surgery and was out for the rest of the season. Catching, meant to be a Sox strongpoint, became a weak one instead. Then Rick Wise, who was expected to join with Luis Tiant and Bill Lee to give the Sox a solid 1–2–3 punch on the mound, missed much of the early part of the season with a shoulder injury, and when he was coming back from that he broke a finger when his wife accidentally closed a door on his hand. He ended up at 3–4 with Boston in 1974.

==== Falling short again ====
Despite the injuries, the team persevered, actually holding a seven-game lead as of August 23. After that, the Sox went into an incredible slump, losing 24 of the final 38 games and dropping all the way to third. As late as August 29, they were still up on the second place New York Yankees by 5 and the Baltimore Orioles by 8. Boston lost 8 in a row, including an infamous Labor Day doubleheader to the streaking Orioles, both games by the score of 1–0. Boston finished the season seven games behind the division-winning Orioles and five behind second-place New York. They went 5–13 in one and two run games during the slump, including several 1–0 losses to either Baltimore or New York.

As a team they batted .203 over their last 33 games. Boston fans were livid, and some said that the Sox had been playing over their heads all along and that it had finally caught up with them, especially when they lacked Fisk and Wise. Boston licked its wounds, taking some consolation from Carl Yastrzemski's .301 average, with 15 homers and 79 RBIs. Dwight Evans had a .281 average, 10 homers and 70 RBIs. There were 22 wins for Tiant and 17 for Bill Lee. Twice in three years, the Red Sox fans thought they had the pennant, and twice the team had failed them.

=== Season standings ===
AL East
Team	W	L	Pct.	GB	Home	Road
Baltimore Orioles	91	71	.562	—	46‍–‍35	45‍–‍36
New York Yankees	89	73	.549	2	47‍–‍34	42‍–‍39
Boston Red Sox	84	78	.519	7	46‍–‍35	38‍–‍43
Cleveland Indians	77	85	.475	14	40‍–‍41	37‍–‍44
Milwaukee Brewers	76	86	.469	15	40‍–‍41	36‍–‍45
Detroit Tigers	72	90	.444	19	36‍–‍45	36‍–‍45

=== Record vs. opponents ===
1974 American League record Sources:
Team	BAL	BOS	CAL	CWS	CLE	DET	KC	MIL	MIN	NYY	OAK	TEX
Baltimore	—	10–8	7–5	5–7	12–6	14–4	8–4	8–10	6–6	11–7	6–6	4–8
Boston	8–10	—	4–8	8–4	9–9	11–7	4–8	10–8	6–6	11–7	8–4	5–7
California	5–7	8–4	—	10–8–1	3–9	5–7	8–10	3–9	8–10	3–9	6–12	9–9
Chicago	7–5	4–8	8–10–1	—	8–4	7–5	11–7	8–4	7–11–1	4–8	7–11	9–7–1
Cleveland	6–12	9–9	9–3	4–8	—	9–9	8–4	10–8	6–6	7–11	5–7	4–8
Detroit	4–14	7–11	7–5	5–7	9–9	—	7–5	9–9	3–9	11–7	5–7	5–7
Kansas City	4–8	8–4	10–8	7–11	4–8	5–7	—	11–1	8–10	4–8	8–10	8–10
Milwaukee	10–8	8–10	9–3	4–8	8–10	9–9	1–11	—	6–6	9–9	5–7	7–5
Minnesota	6–6	6–6	10–8	11–7–1	6–6	9–3	10–8	6–6	—	4–8	5–13	9–9
New York	7–11	7–11	9–3	8–4	11–7	7–11	8–4	9–9	8–4	—	7–5	8–4
Oakland	6–6	4–8	12–6	11–7	7–5	7–5	10–8	7–5	13–5	5–7	—	8–10
Texas	8–4	7–5	9–9	7–9–1	8–4	7–5	10–8	5–7	9–9	4–8	10–8	—

=== Opening Day lineup ===
4	Tommy Harper	DH
20	Juan Beníquez	CF
17	Cecil Cooper	1B
8	Carl Yastrzemski	LF
6	Rico Petrocelli	3B
1	Bernie Carbo	RF
10	Bob Montgomery	C
2	Doug Griffin	2B
18	Mario Guerrero	SS
23	Luis Tiant	P

=== Roster ===
1974 Boston Red Sox
Roster
Pitchers: 46 Steve Barr; 42 Lance Clemons; 33,26 Reggie Cleveland; 41 Dick Drago; 37 Bill Lee; 21 Juan Marichal; 29 Roger Moret; 28 Don Newhauser; 45 Dick Pole; 36 Diego Seguí; 23 Luis Tiant; 55 Bob Veale; 40 Rick Wise	Catchers: 39 Tim Blackwell; 48 Bob Didier; 27 Carlton Fisk; 33 Tim McCarver; 10 Bob Montgomery; Infielders: 7 Rick Burleson; 5 Danny Cater; 17 Cecil Cooper; 48 Chuck Goggin; 2 Doug Griffin; 18 Mario Guerrero; 38 Terry Hughes; 12 John Kennedy; 3 Dick McAuliffe; 6 Rico Petrocelli; 8 Carl Yastrzemski	Outfielders: 20 Juan Beníquez; 1 Bernie Carbo; 24 Dwight Evans; 4 Tommy Harper; 19 Fred Lynn; 16 Rick Miller; 14 Jim Rice; Other batters: 30 Deron Johnson	Manager: 22 Darrell Johnson; Coaches: 31 Don Bryant (Bullpen); 32 Eddie Popowski (First base); 35 Lee Stange (Pitching); 34 Don Zimmer (Third base)

== Player stats ==
=== Batting ===
Note: G = Games played; AB = At bats; R = Runs; H = Hits; 2B = Doubles; 3B = Triples; HR = Home runs; RBI = Runs batted in; SB = Stolen bases; BB = Walks; AVG = Batting average; SLG = Slugging average

Player	G	AB	R	H	2B	3B	HR	RBI	SB	BB	AVG	SLG
Carl Yastrzemski	148	515	93	155	25	2	15	79	12	104	.301	.445
Dwight Evans	133	463	60	130	19	8	10	70	4	38	.281	.421
Rico Petrocelli	129	454	53	121	23	1	15	76	1	48	.267	.421
Tommy Harper	118	443	66	105	15	3	5	24	28	46	.237	.318
Cecil Cooper	121	414	55	114	24	1	8	43	2	32	.275	.396
Juan Beníquez	106	389	60	104	14	3	5	33	19	25	.267	.357
Rick Burleson	114	384	36	109	22	0	4	44	3	21	.284	.372
Bernie Carbo	117	338	40	84	20	0	12	61	4	58	.249	.414
Doug Griffin	93	312	35	83	12	4	0	33	2	28	.266	.330
Mario Guerrero	93	284	18	70	6	2	0	23	3	13	.246	.282
Rick Miller	114	280	41	73	8	1	5	22	13	37	.261	.350
Dick McAuliffe	100	272	32	57	13	1	5	24	2	39	.210	.320
Bob Montgomery	88	254	26	64	10	0	4	38	3	13	.252	.339
Carlton Fisk	52	187	36	56	12	1	11	26	5	24	.299	.551
Danny Cater	56	126	14	31	5	0	5	20	1	10	.246	.405
Tim Blackwell	44	122	9	30	1	1	0	8	1	10	.246	.270
Terry Hughes	41	69	5	14	2	0	1	6	0	6	.203	.275
Jim Rice	24	67	6	18	2	1	1	13	0	4	.269	.373
Fred Lynn	15	43	5	18	2	2	2	10	0	6	.419	.698
Tim McCarver	11	28	3	7	1	0	0	1	1	4	.250	.286
Deron Johnson	11	25	0	3	0	0	0	2	0	0	.120	.120
John Kennedy	10	15	3	2	0	0	1	1	0	1	.133	.333
Bob Didier	5	14	0	1	0	0	0	1	0	2	.071	.071
Chuck Goggin	2	1	0	0	0	0	0	0	0	0	.000	.000
Team totals	162	5499	696	1499	236	31	109	658	104	569	.264	.377

=== Pitching ===
Note: W = Wins; L = Losses; ERA = Earned run average; G = Games pitched; GS = Games started; SV = Saves; IP = Innings pitched; H = Hits allowed; R = Runs allowed; ER = Earned runs allowed; BB = Walks allowed; SO = Strikeouts

Player	W	L	ERA	G	GS	SV	IP	H	R	ER	BB	SO
Luis Tiant	22	13	2.92	38	38	0	311.1	281	106	101	82	176
Bill Lee	17	15	3.51	38	37	0	282.1	320	123	110	67	95
Reggie Cleveland	12	14	4.31	41	27	0	221.1	234	121	106	69	103
Dick Drago	7	10	3.48	33	18	3	175.2	165	71	68	56	90
Roger Moret	9	10	3.74	31	21	2	173.1	158	79	72	79	111
Diego Seguí	6	8	4.00	58	0	10	108.0	106	54	48	49	76
Juan Marichal	5	1	4.87	11	9	0	57.1	61	32	31	14	21
Rick Wise	3	4	3.86	9	9	0	49.0	47	23	21	16	25
Dick Pole	1	1	4.20	15	2	1	45.0	55	28	21	13	32
Bob Veale	0	1	5.54	18	0	2	13.0	15	8	8	4	16
Steve Barr	1	0	4.00	1	1	0	9.0	7	4	4	6	3
Lance Clemons	1	0	9.95	6	0	0	6.1	8	8	7	4	1
Don Newhauser	0	1	9.82	2	0	0	3.2	5	4	4	4	2
Team totals	84	78	3.72	162	162	18	1455.1	1462	661	601	463	751

== Statistical leaders ==
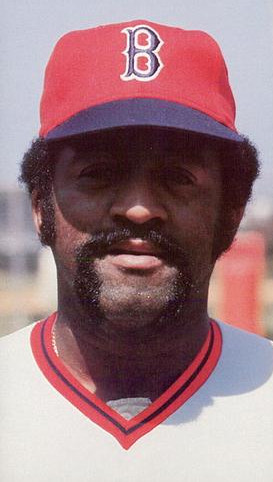
Luis Tiant

Category	Player	Statistic
Youngest player	Tim Blackwell; Jim Rice	21
Oldest player	Bob Veale	38
Wins Above Replacement	Luis Tiant	7.7

=== Batting ===
Abbr.	Category	Player	Statistic
G	Games played	Carl Yastrzemski	148
PA	Plate appearances	Carl Yastrzemski	633
AB	At bats	Carl Yastrzemski	515
R	Runs scored	Carl Yastrzemski	93
H	Hits	Carl Yastrzemski	155
2B	Doubles	Carl Yastrzemski	25
3B	Triples	Dwight Evans	8
HR	Home runs	Rico Petrocelli	15
HR	Home runs	Carl Yastrzemski	15
RBI	Runs batted in	Carl Yastrzemski	79
SB	Stolen bases	Tommy Harper	28
CS	Caught stealing	Tommy Harper	12
BB	Base on balls	Carl Yastrzemski	104
SO	Strikeouts	Bernie Carbo	90
BA	Batting average	Carl Yastrzemski	.301
OBP	On-base percentage	Carl Yastrzemski	.414
SLG	Slugging percentage	Carl Yastrzemski	.445
OPS	On-base plus slugging	Carl Yastrzemski	.859
OPS+	Adjusted OPS	Carl Yastrzemski	140
TB	Total bases	Carl Yastrzemski	229
GIDP	Grounded into double play	Rick Burleson	13
HBP	Hit by pitch	Bernie Carbo	4
SH	Sacrifice hits	Tommy Harper	10
SF	Sacrifice flies	Carl Yastrzemski	11
IBB	Intentional base on balls	Carl Yastrzemski	16

=== Pitching ===
Abbr.	Category	Player	Statistic
W	Wins	Luis Tiant	22
L	Losses	Bill Lee	15
W-L %	Winning percentage	Luis Tiant	.629 (22–13)
ERA	Earned run average	Luis Tiant	2.92
G	Games pitched	Diego Seguí	58
GS	Games started	Luis Tiant	38
GF	Games finished	Diego Seguí	46
CG	Complete games	Luis Tiant	25
SHO	Shutouts	Luis Tiant	7
SV	Saves	Diego Seguí	10
IP	Innings pitched	Luis Tiant	311 1/3
SO	Strikeouts	Luis Tiant	176
WHIP	Walks plus hits per inning pitched	Luis Tiant	1.166

== Farm system ==
Level	Team	League	Manager
AAA	Pawtucket Red Sox	International League	Joe Morgan
AA	Bristol Red Sox	Eastern League	Stan Williams
A	Winston-Salem Red Sox	Carolina League	Bill Slack
A	Winter Haven Red Sox	Florida State League	Rac Slider
A-Short Season	Elmira Red Sox	New York–Penn League	Dick Berardino
