= Kim Andrew =

Kim Andrew may refer to:

- Kim Andrew (baseball) (born 1953), American baseball player
- Kim Andrew (golfer) (born 1974), English golfer
