= Tim Blackwell (baseball) =

American baseball player (born 1952)

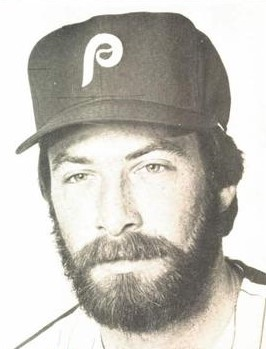
- Catcher
- Born: August 19, 1952 (age 73); San Diego, California, U.S.
- Batted: Switch Threw: Right

MLB debut
- July 3, 1974, for the Boston Red Sox

Last MLB appearance
- May 17, 1983, for the Montreal Expos

MLB statistics
- Batting average: .228
- Home runs: 6
- Runs batted in: 80
- Stats at Baseball Reference

Teams
- Boston Red Sox (1974–1975); Philadelphia Phillies (1976–1977); Montreal Expos (1977); Chicago Cubs (1978–1981); Montreal Expos (1982–1983)

Timothy P. Blackwell (born August 19, 1952) is an American former professional baseball player, coach, and minor league manager. He played as a catcher in Major League Baseball from 1974 to 1983 for the Boston Red Sox, Philadelphia Phillies, Chicago Cubs, and Montreal Expos. He was a switch-hitter who threw right-handed. Blackwell was known as a light-hitting, defensive specialist with good pitch-calling skills and possessed a strong, accurate throwing arm.

== Early years ==
Blackwell graduated from Will C. Crawford High School in San Diego, California in 1970. He briefly attended Grossmont Community College but signed with the Boston Red Sox when he was drafted by them.

== Minor league baseball career ==
Blackwell was drafted at the age of 17 by the Boston Red Sox in the 13th round of the 1970 Major League Baseball draft. He began his professional baseball career that same year with the Jamestown Falcons of the New York–Pennsylvania League. After three years at the Single A level, he was moved up to the Double A level with the Bristol Red Sox of the Eastern League. In 1973, he posted a .283 batting average along with 5 home runs and 38 runs batted in which, earned him a promotion to the Triple A level in 1974 with the Pawtucket Red Sox of the International League.

== Major League Baseball career ==
Blackwell made his major league debut at the age of 21 during a pennant race in July 1974, filling in for an injured Carlton Fisk while the Red Sox were in first place in the American League Eastern Division. Unfortunately, the Red Sox faltered at the end of the season, falling to third place in the final standings. Blackwell was a reserve catcher behind Fisk and Bob Montgomery in 1975 as the Red Sox won the American League Eastern Division title. Although he provided good defensive abilities, he only had a .197 batting average and, the Red Sox elected to use Montgomery as reserve catcher in the post-season as, they defeated the Oakland Athletics in the 1975 American League Championship Series, before losing to the Cincinnati Reds in the 1975 World Series.

In April 1976, Blackwell's contract was purchased from the Red Sox by the Philadelphia Phillies. He served as a reserve catcher behind Bob Boone before being traded to the Montreal Expos in 1977 for Barry Foote. After hitting for a .091 average as Gary Carter's back up, Blackwell was released by the Expos in January 1978 and, signed a contract to play for the Chicago Cubs. With the Cubs he played as a reserve catcher behind Dave Rader and Barry Foote, who had been traded by the Phillies. When Foote was injured in 1980, Blackwell became the Cubs starting catcher, posting career-highs with a .272 batting average along with 16 doubles, 5 home runs and 30 runs batted in. He also led National League catchers in double plays, range factor and baserunners caught stealing, and finished second in assists behind Gary Carter. In 1981, Jody Davis took over as the Cubs main catcher, although Blackwell still managed to finish second among the league's catchers with a .993 fielding percentage in 56 games. Blackwell was granted free agency at the end of the season and, he signed with the Montreal Expos where he served as a reserve catcher behind Gary Carter for one season before retiring as a player in May 1983 at the age of 30.

== Career statistics ==
In a ten-year major league career, Blackwell played in 426 games, accumulating 238 hits in 1,044 at bats for a .228 career batting average along with 6 home runs, 80 runs batted in and a .328 on-base percentage. He ended his career with a .981 fielding percentage. While he was a light-hitting catcher, Blackwell had a strong throwing arm with a quick release and, was a good pitch caller.

== Managing career ==
Following his playing career, Blackwell became a catching instructor and coach with the Toronto Blue Jays organization then became a minor league manager for the Baltimore Orioles, Colorado Rockies, Milwaukee Brewers, San Francisco Giants and New York Mets organizations. He managed the 1989 Pittsfield Mets of the New York–Penn League to the playoffs and garnered Manager of the Year honors, and then led the Columbia Mets to the South Atlantic League championship in 1991. In 1993 and 1994, Blackwell managed the new St. Paul Saints of the independent Northern League. The team won the league's first championship in 1993. He last managed the Winston-Salem Warthogs of the Class A Carolina League in 2008.

Preceded by Mike O'Berry	Frederick Keys Manager; 1996	Succeeded by Julio Gargia
Preceded by Bob Miscik	Bowie Baysox Manager; 1996	Succeeded by Joe Ferguson
