= Morgenweck =

Morgenweck is a surname. Notable people with the surname include:

- Hank Morgenweck (1929–2007), American baseball umpire
- Pop Morgenweck (1875–1941), American basketball player, coach, and team owner
