= Merle Anthony =

American baseball umpire (1924–1993)

Merlyn Anthony
- Born: George Merlyn Anthony; April 26, 1924; Marysville, California, U.S.
- Died: February 2, 1993 (aged 68); Yuba City, California, U.S.
- Other name: Merle Anthony
- Education: Yuba College, Marysville
- Occupation: Umpire
- Years active: 1969-1975
- Employer: American League
- Height: 6 ft (183 cm)
- Spouse: Virginia Luggar

George Merlyn Anthony (April 26, 1924 – February 2, 1993) was an American professional baseball umpire who worked in the American League from 1969 to 1975. Anthony umpired the 1974 Major League Baseball All-Star Game and the 1973 American League Championship Series. In his career, he umpired 965 major league games. Before his umpiring career, he was a Minor League Baseball player in 1946 and 1948.

== Early career ==
Anthony had a brief minor league career as a player in the 1940s and 1950s. He returned to the minor leagues as an umpire between 1960 and 1969. During that period, Anthony umpired in the California League and the Pacific Coast League before receiving the nod to work in the major leagues.

== MLB career ==
=== Notable games ===
Anthony was added to the American League staff in June 1969 following a traumatic brain injury to Cal Drummond, who died in May 1970 due to complications from that injury while working a rehabilitation assignment in Des Moines.

As a home plate umpire on July 9, 1971, Anthony was involved in two arguments with Tony Conigliaro that preceded Conigliaro's retirement the next day. The first ensued when Conigliaro swung at a dropped third strike. The slugger ran to first base, but Anthony called him out per baseball rules, as there was already a runner occupying first base. In the 19th inning, Conigliaro was called out on strikes while attempting to bunt. Conigliaro tossed his helmet in the air and hit it with his bat. The player was ejected by one of Anthony's crew members, George Maloney.

Anthony was also one of the first three umpires, along with Don Denkinger and Dave Phillips, to switch to the inside chest protector, which American League umpires were allowed to use beginning in the 1975 season.

== Personal life ==
Anthony was married to the former Virginia Luggar. He was sales manager of the local Plymouth dealer during the 1950s. Merle died on February 2, 1993. He was 66 years old.

== See also ==
- List of Major League Baseball umpires (disambiguation)
