= 1970 National League Championship Series =

2nd edition of Major League Baseball's National League Championship Series

Team (Wins)	Managers	Season
Cincinnati Reds (3)	Sparky Anderson	102–60, .630, GA: 14½
Pittsburgh Pirates (0)	Danny Murtaugh	89–73, .549, GA: 5
- Dates: October 3–5
- Umpires: John Grimsley, Fred Blandford, Hank Morgenweck, George Grygiel (Game 1); Stan Landes, Paul Pryor, Doug Harvey, Bob Engel, Harry Wendelstedt, Nick Colosi (Games 2–3)

Broadcast
- Television: NBC; KDKA-TV (PIT); WLWT (CIN)
- TV announcers: NBC: Curt Gowdy and Tony Kubek (in Pittsburgh); Jim Simpson and Sandy Koufax (in Cincinnati); KDKA-TV: Nellie King and Bob Prince; WLWT: Joe Nuxhall, Pee Wee Reese, Jim McIntyre, and Ed Kennedy

The 1970 National League Championship Series was a semifinal matchup of the 1970 MLB Postseason between the East Division champion Pittsburgh Pirates and the West Division champion Cincinnati Reds. The Reds swept the Pirates three games to none and went on to lose the World Series to the Baltimore Orioles. The series was the second NLCS.

The series was notable for featuring the first postseason baseball played on artificial turf (which was used in both ballparks, which both also opened at midseason). It was also the first of ten NLCS series between 1970 and 1980 that featured either of the Pennsylvania-based MLB clubs representing the NL East, the Philadelphia Phillies or the Pittsburgh Pirates. The only time neither team appeared in the NLCS during that period was in 1973, when the New York Mets won the NL East.

Due to a one-day strike by major league umpires, the series was begun using four minor league umpires, with the regularly assigned crew—including union president Wendelstedt—returning for Games 2 and 3.

== Summary ==
=== Cincinnati Reds vs. Pittsburgh Pirates ===
Cincinnati won the series, 3–0.

Game	Date	Score	Location	Time	Attendance
1	October 3	Cincinnati Reds – 3, Pittsburgh Pirates – 0 (10)	Three Rivers Stadium	2:23	33,088
2	October 4	Cincinnati Reds – 3, Pittsburgh Pirates – 1	Three Rivers Stadium	2:10	39,317
3	October 5	Pittsburgh Pirates – 2, Cincinnati Reds – 3	Riverfront Stadium	2:38	40,538

== Game summaries ==
=== Game 1 ===
October 3, 1970 1:00 pm (ET) at Three Rivers Stadium in Pittsburgh, Pennsylvania
Team	1	2	3	4	5	6	7	8	9	10	R	H	E
Cincinnati	0	0	0	0	0	0	0	0	0	3	3	9	0
Pittsburgh	0	0	0	0	0	0	0	0	0	0	0	8	0
WP: Gary Nolan (1–0) LP: Dock Ellis (0–1) Sv: Clay Carroll (1)

Cincinnati boasted dual heroes in subduing the Pirates in the opening game. Gary Nolan, an 18-game winner during the regular season, pitched nine shutout innings to edge Dock Ellis. Nolan departed for pinch-hitter Ty Cline in the 10th inning which turned out to be a stroke of genius by Reds manager Sparky Anderson. Cline socked a triple to lead off the inning. He scored the decisive run on Pete Rose's single, and Lee May doubled to provide two insurance tallies, sealing Ellis' fate. Reliever Clay Carroll protected Nolan's victory by holding Pittsburgh hitless in the 10th.

Another key contributor was second baseman Tommy Helms. With Pirate runners on second and third inning, Dave Cash rifled a shot to Helms' right. Helms' diving stop and quick throw to first prevented two runs.

=== Game 2 ===
October 4, 1970 1:00 pm (ET) at Three Rivers Stadium in Pittsburgh, Pennsylvania
Team	1	2	3	4	5	6	7	8	9	R	H	E
Cincinnati	0	0	1	0	1	0	0	1	0	3	8	1
Pittsburgh	0	0	0	0	0	1	0	0	0	1	5	2
WP: Jim Merritt (1–0) LP: Luke Walker (0–1) Sv: Don Gullett (1); Home runs: CIN: Bobby Tolan (1); PIT: None

The Reds continued to pound the Pirates in Game 2. Bobby Tolan' hitting proved a challenge to Buc starter Luke Walker. Bobby began his three-hit salvo with a single in the third inning. He stole second base and wound up at third on catcher Manny Sanguillén's wild peg into center field. Walker's wild pitch permitted Tolan to score. Bobby delivered his knockout punch in the fifth, belting a home run over the wall in right-center, and capped his big day with a single off reliever Dave Giusti in the eighth.

Lefty Jim Merritt, Cincinnati's lone 20-game winner, was the second-game starter. Arm trouble had kept Merritt on the shelf in the closing weeks of the regular season, but Manager Anderson had precedent going for him in this case. Merritt had beaten the Pirates six times in six starts over the two-year period. He made it seven for seven by lasting 5 1/3 innings this time. Carroll relieved Merritt in the sixth, but gave up two hits and had retired only one batter when Anderson signaled for Gullett.

That did it. Gullett shut off the Pirate threat immediately, striking out the side in the seventh and finishing with 3 1/3 hitless innings for the save.

=== Game 3 ===
October 5, 1970 2:30 pm (ET) at Riverfront Stadium in Cincinnati, Ohio
Team	1	2	3	4	5	6	7	8	9	R	H	E
Pittsburgh	1	0	0	0	1	0	0	0	0	2	10	0
Cincinnati	2	0	0	0	0	0	0	1	X	3	5	0
WP: Milt Wilcox (1–0) LP: Bob Moose (0–1) Sv: Don Gullett (2); Home runs: PIT: None; CIN: Tony Pérez (1), Johnny Bench (1)

The Pirates started the Game 3 scoring by a run in the first inning off Tony Cloninger, who averted disaster three times before Anderson finally yanked him for a pinch-hitter in the fifth with the score 2–2. The slugging Reds uncorked their only power show of the playoffs in the first inning, Tony Pérez and Johnny Bench smacking successive homers off Bob Moose. Pirate starter Moose showed more courage than stuff in the early going. But he hung on and proceeded to halt the Reds until he had two outs in the eighth. Then he walked pinch-hitter Ty Cline and gave up a single to Pete Rose.

With Tolan coming up, Pirate manager Danny Murtaugh brought in lefty Joe Gibbon. Tolan whacked a single to left. Cline took off from second and sped for the plate. he arrived just a hair ahead of Willie Stargell's peg, and the Reds had a 3–2 lead. The Reds had a pitching star in this one, too, young Milt Wilcox, who worked three shutout innings in relief of Cloninger and earned the victory. Wilcox vanished for pinch-hitter Cline in the eighth. Wayne Granger tried to protect the Reds' 3–2 lead in the ninth, but was removed with two down and a runner on first. Gullett was Anderson's choice to wrap it up. The teenager wasn't invincible this time, yielding a single to Stargell. But with runners on first and third, Al Oliver swung at Gullett's first pitch and grounded to Helms and the NL pennant belongs to the Reds, their first in nine years.

== Composite box ==
1970 NLCS (3–0): Cincinnati Reds over Pittsburgh Pirates

Team	1	2	3	4	5	6	7	8	9	10	R	H	E
Cincinnati Reds	2	0	1	0	1	0	0	2	0	3	9	22	1
Pittsburgh Pirates	1	0	0	0	1	1	0	0	0	0	3	23	2
Total attendance: 112,943 Average attendance: 37,648
