= 1977 Major League Baseball All-Star Game =

1977 American baseball competition

	1	2	3	4	5	6	7	8	9	R	H	E
National League	4	0	1	0	0	0	0	2	0	7	9	1
American League	0	0	0	0	0	2	1	0	2	5	8	0
- Date: July 19, 1977
- Venue: Yankee Stadium
- City: Bronx, New York
- Managers: Sparky Anderson (CIN); Billy Martin (NYY)
- MVP: Don Sutton (LA)
- Attendance: 56,683
- Ceremonial first pitch: Rachel Robinson
- Television: NBC
- TV announcers: Joe Garagiola and Tony Kubek
- Radio: CBS
- Radio announcers: Vin Scully and Brent Musburger

The 1977 Major League Baseball All-Star Game was the 48th playing of the midsummer classic between the all-stars of the American League (AL) and National League (NL), the two leagues comprising Major League Baseball. The game was held on July 19, 1977, at Yankee Stadium in The Bronx, New York City, the home of the New York Yankees of the American League. The game resulted in the National League defeating the American League 7–5.

The host Yankees went on to win the World Series; the third time in history that a team hosting the All-Star Game would win the World Series in the same year. As of 2025, the 1977 Yankees are the last team to accomplish this feat. The previous teams to accomplish this were the 1939 New York Yankees and the 1959 Los Angeles Dodgers. Since 1977, this would have happened two other times, with the 2020 Los Angeles Dodgers, but the All-Star Game was canceled due to the COVID-19 pandemic, and the 2021 Atlanta Braves, but the All-Star Game was moved to Denver.

This was Yankee Stadium's third time as hosts of the All-Star Game, and it would be its last until 2008; the last year of the park's use by the Yankees.

== Rosters ==
Players in italics have since been inducted into the National Baseball Hall of Fame.

=== National League ===
Starters
Position	Player	Team	All-Star Games
P	Don Sutton	Dodgers	4
C	Johnny Bench	Reds	10
1B	Steve Garvey	Dodgers	4
2B	Joe Morgan	Reds	8
3B	Ron Cey	Dodgers	4
SS	Dave Concepción	Reds	4
OF	George Foster	Reds	2
OF	Greg Luzinski	Phillies	3
OF	Dave Parker	Pirates	1

Pitchers
Position	Player	Team	All-Star Games
P	Joaquín Andújar	Astros	1
P	John Candelaria	Pirates	1
P	Steve Carlton	Phillies	6
P	Goose Gossage	Pirates	3
P	Gary Lavelle	Giants	1
P	Rick Reuschel	Cubs	1
P	Tom Seaver	Reds	10
P	Bruce Sutter	Cubs	1

Reserves
Position	Player	Team	All-Star Games
C	Ted Simmons	Cardinals	4
C	John Stearns	Mets	1
1B	Willie Montañez	Braves	1
2B	Manny Trillo	Cubs	1
3B	Pete Rose	Reds	11
3B	Mike Schmidt	Phillies	3
SS	Garry Templeton	Cardinals	1
OF	Ken Griffey, Sr.	Reds	2
OF	Jerry Morales	Cubs	1
OF	Reggie Smith	Dodgers	5
OF	Ellis Valentine	Expos	1
OF	Dave Winfield	Padres	1

=== American League ===
Starters
Position	Player	Team	All-Star Games
P	Jim Palmer	Orioles	5
C	Carlton Fisk	Red Sox	5
1B	Rod Carew	Twins	11
2B	Willie Randolph	Yankees	2
3B	George Brett	Royals	2
SS	Rick Burleson	Red Sox	1
OF	Reggie Jackson	Yankees	7
OF	Carl Yastrzemski	Red Sox	14
OF	Richie Zisk	White Sox	1

Pitchers
Position	Player	Team	All-Star Games
P	Vida Blue	Athletics	3
P	Bill Campbell	Red Sox	1
P	Dennis Eckersley	Indians	1
P	Mark Fidrych	Tigers	2
P	Jim Kern	Indians	1
P	Dave LaRoche	Angels	2
P	Sparky Lyle	Yankees	3
P	Nolan Ryan	Angels	4
P	Jim Slaton	Brewers	1
P	Frank Tanana	Angels	2

Reserves
Position	Player	Team	All-Star Games
C	Thurman Munson	Yankees	6
C	Butch Wynegar	Twins	2
1B	Ron Fairly	Blue Jays	2
1B	George Scott	Red Sox	3
1B	Jason Thompson	Tigers	1
2B	Don Money	Brewers	3
3B	Wayne Gross	Athletics	1
3B	Graig Nettles	Yankees	2
SS	Bert Campaneris	Rangers	6
OF	Larry Hisle	Twins	1
OF	Ruppert Jones	Mariners	1
OF	Fred Lynn	Red Sox	3
OF	Jim Rice	Red Sox	1
OF	Ken Singleton	Orioles	1

== Game ==
=== Umpires ===
Home plate	Bill Kunkel (AL)
First base	Doug Harvey (NL)
Second base	Dave Phillips (AL)
Third base	Dick Stello (NL)
Left field	Joe Brinkman (AL)
Right field	Frank Pulli (NL)

=== Starting lineups ===
National League				American League			
Order	Player	Team	Position	Order	Player	Team	Position
1	Joe Morgan	Reds	2B	1	Rod Carew	Twins	1B
2	Steve Garvey	Dodgers	1B	2	Willie Randolph	Yankees	2B
3	Dave Parker	Pirates	RF	3	George Brett	Royals	3B
4	George Foster	Reds	CF	4	Carl Yastrzemski	Red Sox	CF
5	Greg Luzinski	Phillies	LF	5	Richie Zisk	White Sox	LF
6	Ron Cey	Dodgers	3B	6	Reggie Jackson	Yankees	RF
7	Johnny Bench	Reds	C	7	Carlton Fisk	Red Sox	C
8	Dave Concepción	Reds	SS	8	Rick Burleson	Red Sox	SS
9	Don Sutton	Dodgers	P	9	Jim Palmer	Orioles	P

=== Game summary ===
Tuesday, July 19, 1977 8:30 pm (ET) at Yankee Stadium in Bronx, New York
Team	1	2	3	4	5	6	7	8	9	R	H	E
National League	4	0	1	0	0	0	0	2	0	7	9	1
American League	0	0	0	0	0	2	1	0	2	5	8	0
WP: Don Sutton (1–0) LP: Jim Palmer (0–1); Home runs: NL: Greg Luzinski (1), Joe Morgan (1), Steve Garvey (1); AL: George Scott (1)

The National League started with Joe Morgan blasting American League starter Jim Palmer's sixth pitch into Yankee Stadium's "short porch" in right field. After Steve Garvey struck out, Dave Parker followed with a single and scored on a double by George Foster. After Palmer wild-pitched Foster to third, Greg Luzinski made it 4–0 with a two-run homer. Steve Garvey then sent Palmer to the showers in the third with a homer to make it 5–0 in favor of the NL.

Meanwhile, National League starter Don Sutton cruised along with three shutout innings and Gary Lavelle added two more in the fourth and fifth. The American League first scored off of Tom Seaver in the sixth as Rod Carew led off with a single and went to second when Seaver stopped a lightning-fast shot up the middle hit by Willie Randolph. Seaver recovered to retire Randolph and retired George Brett, but then walked Fred Lynn and surrendered a two-run double to Richie Zisk. Seaver allowed the AL another run in the seventh when Butch Wynegar led off with a single, took second when Graig Nettles reached on an error, and scored on a single by Randolph.

The National League got their final runs in the eighth when Dave Winfield hit a two-run single off Sparky Lyle. George Scott hit a two-run homer in the ninth for the AL off Rich Gossage for the final margin.
