= Doug Griffin =

American baseball player (1947–2016)

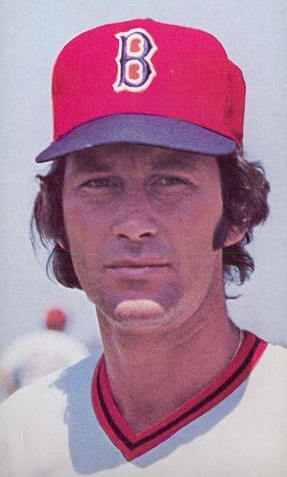
- Second baseman
- Born: June 4, 1947; South Gate, California, U.S.
- Died: July 27, 2016 (aged 69); Clovis, California, U.S.
- Batted: Right Threw: Right

MLB debut
- September 11, 1970, for the California Angels

Last MLB appearance
- June 2, 1977, for the Boston Red Sox

MLB statistics
- Batting average: .245
- Home runs: 7
- Runs batted in: 165
- Stats at Baseball Reference

Teams
- California Angels (1970); Boston Red Sox (1971–1977)

Career highlights and awards
- Gold Glove Award (1972)

Douglas Lee Griffin (June 4, 1947 – July 27, 2016) was an American professional baseball second baseman who played for the California Angels and Boston Red Sox of Major League Baseball (MLB).

== Early life ==
Griffin played high school baseball at El Monte High School in California, graduating in 1965, where he achieved All-Pacific League, All-Valley, and All-California Interscholastic Federation honors. He also lettered in basketball, football and track.

== Professional career ==
Griffin was drafted in the 21st round of the 1965 Major League Baseball draft by the California Angels, and played in their minor league organization until his call-up in 1970. After 18 games with the Angels, in which he hit .127 with four RBI in 62 games, he was traded to the Red Sox in a six-player trade that sent popular outfielder Tony Conigliaro to the Angels. Griffin was the Red Sox' regular second baseman from 1971 until mid-1975. He was not a particularly good hitter, posting modest batting averages with few walks and very little power, but instead he was an excellent fielder, winning a Gold Glove Award in 1972.

In June 1975, the Red Sox acquired veteran second baseman Denny Doyle from the Angels, and for the rest of the season, the left-handed-hitting Doyle was the Red Sox's primary second baseman, with the right-handed-hitting Griffin starting only against left-handed pitchers. Griffin did not appear in the American League Championship Series against the Oakland Athletics, and made only one brief appearance in the World Series against the Cincinnati Reds.

Griffin suffered numerous injuries during his professional career. On April 30, 1974, Griffin was beaned by a Nolan Ryan fastball, knocking him unconscious. The beaning left him with a concussion and temporary hearing loss. On August 30, 1975, he was beaned again, this time by Oakland's Dick Bosman. Griffin experienced hearing and equilibrium problems, but recovered very quickly. This time he had been wearing an ear flap with his protective helmet. Griffin played only sparingly in 1976, and was released after playing in only five games in 1977.

== Later life ==
After baseball, Griffin worked in construction. First with his father in the 1970s, and later for Buddy LeRoux in the 1980s.

On July 27, 2016, Griffin died after a long illness.
