= 1974 Major League Baseball All-Star Game =

1974 American baseball competition

	1	2	3	4	5	6	7	8	9	R	H	E
American League	0	0	2	0	0	0	0	0	0	2	4	1
National League	0	1	0	2	1	0	1	2	x	7	10	1
- Date: July 23, 1974
- Venue: Three Rivers Stadium
- City: Pittsburgh, Pennsylvania
- Managers: Dick Williams (CAL); Yogi Berra (NYM)
- MVP: Steve Garvey (LA)
- Attendance: 50,706
- Ceremonial first pitch: John W. Galbreath
- Television: NBC
- TV announcers: Curt Gowdy, Joe Garagiola and Tony Kubek
- Radio: NBC
- Radio announcers: Jim Simpson and Maury Wills

The 1974 Major League Baseball All-Star Game was the 45th playing of the midsummer classic between the all-stars of the American League (AL) and National League (NL), the two leagues comprising Major League Baseball. The game was held on July 23, 1974, at Three Rivers Stadium in Pittsburgh, Pennsylvania the home of the Pittsburgh Pirates of the National League. The game resulted in the National League defeating the American League 7–2.

This marked the third time the Pirates had been host for the All-Star Game (the first two having been in 1944 and the first game in 1959). This would be the first of two times that the game would be played at Three Rivers Stadium, with the stadium hosting again in 1994.

== American League roster ==
The American League roster included 11 future Hall of Fame players, denoted in italics.

=== Elected starters ===
Position	Player	Team	Notes
C	Carlton Fisk	Boston Red Sox	injured
1B	Dick Allen	Chicago White Sox
2B	Rod Carew	Minnesota Twins
3B	Brooks Robinson	Baltimore Orioles
SS	Bert Campaneris	Oakland Athletics
OF	Reggie Jackson	Oakland Athletics
OF	Bobby Murcer	New York Yankees
OF	Jeff Burroughs	Texas Rangers

=== Pitchers ===
Throws	Pitcher	Team	Notes
RH	Steve Busby	Kansas City Royals	did not pitch
RH	Mike Cuellar	Baltimore Orioles	did not pitch
RH	Rollie Fingers	Oakland Athletics
LH	John Hiller	Detroit Tigers	did not pitch
RH	Catfish Hunter	Oakland Athletics
RH	Gaylord Perry	Cleveland Indians	starting pitcher
RH	Luis Tiant	Boston Red Sox
LH	Wilbur Wood	Chicago White Sox	did not pitch

=== Reserve position players ===
Position	Player	Team	Notes
C	Ed Herrmann	Chicago White Sox	did not play
C	Thurman Munson	New York Yankees	replaced Fisk in starting lineup
C	Darrell Porter	Milwaukee Brewers	did not play
C	Jim Sundberg	Texas Rangers
1B	John Mayberry	Kansas City Royals
1B	Carl Yastrzemski	Boston Red Sox
2B	Bobby Grich	Baltimore Orioles
2B	Cookie Rojas	Kansas City Royals
3B	Sal Bando	Oakland Athletics	injured
3B	Dave Chalk	California Angels
3B	Don Money	Milwaukee Brewers
OF	George Hendrick	Cleveland Indians
OF	Al Kaline	Detroit Tigers
OF	Frank Robinson	California Angels
OF	Joe Rudi	Oakland Athletics

=== Coaching staff ===
Position	Manager	Team
Manager	Dick Williams	California Angels
Coach	Whitey Herzog	California Angels
Coach	Jack McKeon	Kansas City Royals
Coach	Earl Weaver	Baltimore Orioles

== National League roster ==
The National League roster included 7 future Hall of Fame players, denoted in italics.

=== Elected starters ===
Position	Player	Team	Notes
C	Johnny Bench	Cincinnati Reds
1B	Steve Garvey	Los Angeles Dodgers
2B	Joe Morgan	Cincinnati Reds
3B	Ron Cey	Los Angeles Dodgers
SS	Larry Bowa	Philadelphia Phillies
OF	Hank Aaron	Atlanta Braves
OF	Pete Rose	Cincinnati Reds
OF	Jimmy Wynn	Los Angeles Dodgers

=== Pitchers ===
Throws	Pitcher	Team	Notes
LH	Ken Brett	Pittsburgh Pirates
RH	Buzz Capra	Atlanta Braves	did not pitch
LH	Steve Carlton	Philadelphia Phillies	did not pitch
RH	Mike Marshall	Los Angeles Dodgers
LH	Jon Matlack	New York Mets
RH	Lynn McGlothen	St. Louis Cardinals
RH	Andy Messersmith	Los Angeles Dodgers	starting pitcher
RH	Steve Rogers	Montreal Expos	did not pitch

=== Reserve position players ===
Position	Player	Team	Notes
C	Jerry Grote	New York Mets
C	Ted Simmons	St. Louis Cardinals	did not play
1B	Tony Pérez	Cincinnati Reds
2B	Dave Cash	Philadelphia Phillies
3B	Mike Schmidt	Philadelphia Phillies
SS	Don Kessinger	Chicago Cubs
SS	Chris Speier	San Francisco Giants
OF	Lou Brock	St. Louis Cardinals
OF	César Cedeño	Houston Astros
OF	Ralph Garr	Atlanta Braves
OF	Johnny Grubb	San Diego Padres
OF	Reggie Smith	St. Louis Cardinals

=== Coaching staff ===
Position	Manager	Team
Manager	Yogi Berra	New York Mets
Coach	Sparky Anderson	Cincinnati Reds
Coach	Red Schoendienst	St. Louis Cardinals

== Starting lineups ==
While the starters were elected by the fans, the batting orders and starting pitchers were selected by the managers.

American League				National League			
Order	Player	Team	Position	Order	Player	Team	Position
1	Rod Carew	Minnesota Twins	2B	1	Pete Rose	Cincinnati Reds	LF
2	Bert Campaneris	Oakland Athletics	SS	2	Joe Morgan	Cincinnati Reds	2B
3	Reggie Jackson	Oakland Athletics	RF	3	Hank Aaron	Atlanta Braves	RF
4	Dick Allen	Chicago White Sox	1B	4	Johnny Bench	Cincinnati Reds	C
5	Bobby Murcer	New York Yankees	CF	5	Jimmy Wynn	Los Angeles Dodgers	CF
6	Jeff Burroughs	Texas Rangers	LF	6	Steve Garvey	Los Angeles Dodgers	1B
7	Brooks Robinson	Baltimore Orioles	3B	7	Ron Cey	Los Angeles Dodgers	3B
8	Thurman Munson	New York Yankees	C	8	Larry Bowa	Philadelphia Phillies	SS
9	Gaylord Perry	Cleveland Indians	P	9	Andy Messersmith	Los Angeles Dodgers	P

== Umpires ==
Position	Umpire
Home Plate	Ed Sudol (NL)
First Base	Art Frantz (AL)
Second Base	Ed Vargo (NL)
Third Base	Merle Anthony (AL)
Left Field	John Kibler (NL)
Right Field	George Maloney (AL)

== Scoring summary ==
The National League took a 1–0 lead in the bottom of the second off of AL starter Gaylord Perry. With two outs, Steve Garvey singled, and then scored on Ron Cey's double.

The American League responded immediately, scoring twice off of NL starter Andy Messersmith in the top of the third inning. Thurman Munson led off with a double to open the inning, and advanced to third base on a successful sacrifice bunt by Gaylord Perry. Rod Carew walked. The next batter, Bert Campaneris, struck out as Carew stole second base. Carew immediately advanced to third base on the throwing error by NL catcher Johnny Bench, which also allowed Munson to score. Reggie Jackson walked. Dick Allen singled sending Jackson to second base, and scoring Carew. This ended the scoring for the American League.

The NL retook the lead with a two-run bottom of the fourth inning off of AL relief pitcher, Luis Tiant. Johnny Bench led off with a single, and advanced to third base when Jimmy Wynn singled in the next at-bat. Steve Garvey doubled, scoring Bench, and sending Wynn to third base. Ron Cey grounded out, permitting Garvey to advance to third base and scoring Wynn.

In the bottom of the fifth inning, the NL added an unearned run. Pinch hitter Lou Brock singled. With Joe Morgan batting, Brock stole second base, and advanced to third base on a throwing error by AL catcher Thurman Munson. Morgan hit a sacrifice fly to the outfield, permitting Brock to tag up and score from third base, and extend the NL lead to 4–2.

In the bottom of the seventh inning, with Catfish Hunter in his second inning of relief pitching for the AL, Reggie Smith led off with a home run to push the NL lead to 5–2.

The NL closed out the game's scoring in the bottom of the eighth inning facing the new AL relief pitcher, Rollie Fingers. With one out, Mike Schmidt walked, and then scored on Don Kessinger's triple. With Mike Marshall batting, Kessinger scored when Fingers threw a wild pitch. The final two runs brought the final score to 7–2.

=== Line score ===
Tuesday, July 23, 1974 8:15 pm (ET) at Three Rivers Stadium in Pittsburgh, Pennsylvania
Team	1	2	3	4	5	6	7	8	9	R	H	E
American League	0	0	2	0	0	0	0	0	0	2	4	1
National League	0	1	0	2	1	0	1	2	X	7	10	1
WP: Ken Brett (1-0) LP: Luis Tiant (0-1); Home runs: AL: None; NL: Reggie Smith (1)

== Game notes and records ==
Ken Brett was credited with the win. Luis Tiant was credited with the loss.

Dick Williams was manager of the American League squad by virtue of having been manager of the 1973 American League Champion Oakland Athletics. Williams left the team after the season, and was signed to manage the California Angels.

Steve Garvey's name was omitted from the ballots given to fans. He was elected to the NL squad by virtue of a successful write-in campaign.
