= Joe Brinkman =

American baseball umpire (born 1944)

- Born: April 9, 1944 (age 82); Little Falls, Minnesota, U.S.
- Occupation: MLB umpire
- Years active: 1972–2006
- Height: 6 ft 2 in (1.88 m)

Joseph Norbert Brinkman (born April 9, 1944) is an American former umpire in Major League Baseball (MLB) who worked in the American League (AL) from 1972 to 1999 and throughout both major leagues from 2000 until his retirement during the 2006 season.

== Career ==
Brinkman‘s 35 years of umpiring AL games surpassed the record set by Larry Barnett (1968–1999). Brinkman is fifth all time in number of games worked in the Major Leagues. Three of the four ahead of him are in the Hall of Fame. Brinkman umpired in three World Series (1978, 1986, 1995). He officiated in five American League Championship Series (1976, 1980, 1987, 1992, 1997), and in three All-Star games (1977, 1991, 1996), calling balls and strikes in 1991. Brinkman worked the Division Series in 1981, 1995, 1998, 1999, 2004 and 2005. He also officiated in A. J. Burnett's no-hitter against the San Diego Padres on May 12, 2001. Brinkman served as the crew chief for the ALCS in 1987 and 1997, and also for the 2005 NLDS. His retirement was announced on August 22, 2006. Former umpire Bob Davidson returned to replace Brinkman on the major league roster. He worked home plate for the final game at Comiskey Park in 1990.

=== Pine tar game ===
Brinkman was also the crew chief during the Pine Tar Incident between the Kansas City Royals and New York Yankees on July 24, 1983. In that game, George Brett of the Royals hit a two-run home run off of Yankees reliever Goose Gossage in the ninth inning, but home plate umpire Tim McClelland, after conferring with Brinkman and the rest of the crew, found that the pine tar on Brett's bat exceeded the allowed limit of 18 inches, and Brett was called out. Brett immediately ran out of the dugout toward the umpires, and disputed the call so vehemently that Brinkman had to grab him around the neck to keep him from attacking McClelland. Brinkman recovered Brett's bat, having caught a batboy attempting to hide it in the Royals' clubhouse.

American League president Lee MacPhail later overturned the umpires' ruling upon a protest by the Royals, and the home run was restored. However, when the game was resumed on August 18, Brinkman and his crew were not present. He had provided an affidavit stating that Brett and baserunner U. L. Washington had touched all the bases, anticipating appeal plays by Yankees manager Billy Martin to state that the runners missed at least one base. Dave Phillips, the crew chief of the umpiring crew that was at Yankee Stadium when the game resumed, showed Martin a copy of the affidavit.

=== Uniform and number ===
Brinkman wore uniform number 15 from the year the AL adopted uniform numbers in 1980, and kept the number when MLB took over supervision of a combined umpiring staff in 2000. He was one of the last active umpires to have worn the red blazers that were part of the AL's umpiring uniforms from 1973 through 1979. (Derryl Cousins was the last remaining umpire to have worn the blazer; he retired in 2012.) Brinkman likened the red coats to making AL umpires look like "a bunch of Captain Kangaroos" in cold weather. When Brinkman retired, he was the last active umpire to have used the outside chest protector, which was required for AL umpires through the 1974 season. The league made new umpires wear the inside chest protector starting in 1977. Brinkman was not the last umpire to wear the "balloon" protector, having switched to the inside protector in 1980. Bill Kunkel and Jerry Neudecker were the last umpires to use the "balloon" protector. Neither made the switch, with Kunkel succumbing to cancer early in the 1985 season (Kunkel worked his last game in August 1984), and Neudecker retiring after the 1985 season.

Brinkman was the last active umpire to have worked in the American League prior to the establishment of the Designated Hitter for the 1973 season. He came up for three games late in the 1972 season, before joining the AL staff full-time in 1973.

Brinkman ran the Joe Brinkman Umpire's School, which he had purchased from retired Major League Umpire Bill Kinnamon. Brinkman sold this to fellow AL umpire Jim Evans in the late 1990s. Brinkman was prominent in union affairs for both the Major League Umpire's Association and the newly formed World Umpire's Association (having served as the organization’s first Vice President).

Brinkman was the left field umpire for Game 5 of the 1995 American League Division Series between the Seattle Mariners and the New York Yankees, meaning he was the umpire who officially ruled Edgar Martinez's famous double a fair ball. Brinkman was also the home plate umpire for Game 6 of the 1995 World Series between the Cleveland Indians and the Atlanta Braves.

== Personal ==
For several years Brinkman operated the Joe Brinkman Umpire's School in Cocoa, Florida, and has worked at several baseball camps and clinics over the years. He was raised in Holdingford, Minnesota, and graduated from Holdingford High School.
