= Reggie Cleveland =

Canadian baseball player (born 1948)

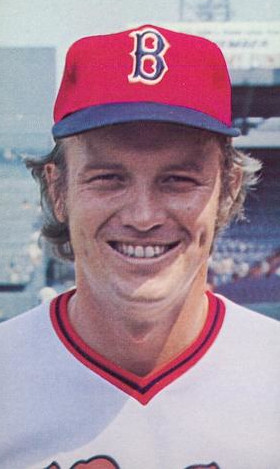
- Cleveland with the Boston Red Sox in 1976
- Pitcher
- Born: May 23, 1948 (age 77); Swift Current, Saskatchewan, Canada
- Batted: Right Threw: Right

MLB debut
- October 1, 1969, for the St. Louis Cardinals

Last MLB appearance
- September 23, 1981, for the Milwaukee Brewers

MLB statistics
- Win–loss record: 105–106
- Earned run average: 4.01
- Strikeouts: 930
- Stats at Baseball Reference

Teams
- St. Louis Cardinals (1969–1973); Boston Red Sox (1974–1978); Texas Rangers (1978); Milwaukee Brewers (1979–1981)

Member of the Canadian

Baseball Hall of Fame
- Induction: 1986

Reginald Leslie Cleveland (born May 23, 1948) is a Canadian former professional baseball player. A right-handed pitcher, Cleveland appeared in 428 games in Major League Baseball over 13 seasons (1969–81) for four teams. Born in Swift Current, Saskatchewan, and raised in Cold Lake, Alberta, Cleveland was listed as 6 feet 1 inch (1.85 m) tall and 195 pounds (88 kg) (13 stone, 13 lbs.). He was elected to the Canadian Baseball Hall of Fame in 1986.

== Career ==
Cleveland originally signed with the St. Louis Cardinals in 1966, and after a one-game trial with the 1969 Redbirds, he made the major leagues for good during August of 1970. In his first full season, he won 12 games and the 1971 National League Rookie Pitcher of the Year Award from The Sporting News. He hurled for the Cardinals (through 1973), Boston Red Sox (1974–78), Texas Rangers (1978) and Milwaukee Brewers (1979–81).

As a member of the pennant-winning 1975 Red Sox, he was the starting pitcher in Game 2 of the 1975 American League Championship Series against the Oakland Athletics. He allowed three runs and seven hits in five innings of work, exiting the game with the score tied, 3–3. He earned a no-decision, with Red Sox relief pitcher Roger Moret gaining credit for the win when Boston prevailed, 6–3. Then, in the 1975 World Series, Cleveland worked in three games, two in relief. He was the starting pitcher in Game 5 against the Cincinnati Reds on October 16 at Riverfront Stadium. He gave up seven hits and five runs, all earned, and was charged with the 6–2 loss. He also came out of the bullpen in the top of the ninth inning of Game 7 at Fenway Park and got the final out, but the Reds had already forged ahead against Cleveland's predecessor on the mound, Jim Burton, and secured a 4–3 win and the world championship. The 1975 campaign afforded Cleveland his only postseason appearances; in his four games and 112/3 innings pitched, he compiled a 0–1 win–loss record and a 6.17 earned run average.

He ended his regular-season MLB career with 105 wins and 106 defeats, with a 3.73 ERA, 930 strikeouts, 57 complete games (in 203 career starting assignments), 12 shutouts and 25 saves. In 1,809 innings pitched, he allowed 1,843 hits and 543 bases on balls. In 1976, while with the Red Sox, Cleveland led the American League in fewest home runs allowed per nine innings (0.159). He allowed only 3 home runs in 170 innings pitched that year. He served as a pitching coach in the Toronto Blue Jays' organisation during the 1990s.

== Personal life ==
He has five children, adopted sons Timothy and Jonathan Cleveland, former Olympic swimmer, and three biological children, daughter Michelle and sons Michael and Todd from his first marriage to Kathleen (née Kubicki).
