= Dick Stello =

American baseball umpire (1934-1987)

- Born: Richard Jack Stello; July 20, 1934; Boston, Massachusetts, US
- Died: November 18, 1987 (aged 53); Lakeland, Florida, US
- Occupation: Umpire
- Years active: 1968−1987
- Employer: National League
- Spouse: Chesty Morgan (1974–1979)

Richard Jack Stello (July 20, 1934 – November 18, 1987) was an American professional baseball umpire. He worked in the National League from 1968 to his death in 1987. He wore uniform number 18 for most of his career.

== Early life ==
Stello was born in Boston and lived in an orphanage until age 12. He then went to live with a foster family on a rural Massachusetts farm. Stello joined the United States Air Force and became an airman first class. He was introduced to umpiring while in the air force stationed in Tokyo. Stello umpired local baseball for a year before attending an umpire school and graduating at the top of his class.

== Umpiring career ==
Stello umpired 2,764 major league games in his 20-year career. He umpired in two World Series (1975 and 1981), two All-Star Games (1977 and 1987) and five National League Championship Series (1971, 1976, 1979, 1983, and 1985). Stello was an instructor at the Al Somers Umpire School.

== Personal life ==
Stello was married to stripper and actress Liliana Wilczkowska, better known as Chesty Morgan, from 1974 to a 1979 divorce. After the split, they stayed in contact until his death.

== Death ==
On November 18, 1987, Stello was stopped on the side of a two-lane highway and standing between his car and a driver behind him. A third driver struck the parked cars from behind and Stello was crushed between them. He died instantly.

== See also ==
- List of Major League Baseball umpires (disambiguation)
