= Rick Kreuger =

American baseball player (1948–2026)

- Pitcher
- Born: November 3, 1948; Grand Rapids, Michigan, U.S.
- Died: May 7, 2026 (aged 77); Hudsonville, Michigan, U.S.
- Batted: Right Threw: Left

MLB debut
- September 6, 1975, for the Boston Red Sox

Last appearance
- May 7, 1978, for the Cleveland Indians

MLB statistics
- Win–loss record: 2–2
- Earned run average: 4.47
- Strikeouts: 20

NPB statistics
- Win–loss record: 2–1
- Earned run average: 4.66
- Strikeouts: 16
- Stats at Baseball Reference

Teams
- Boston Red Sox (1975–1977); Cleveland Indians (1978); Yomiuri Giants (1979)

Richard Allen Kreuger (November 3, 1948 – May 7, 2026) was an American professional baseball pitcher. He played in Major League Baseball (MLB) from 1975 through 1978 for the Boston Red Sox and Cleveland Indians. Listed at 6 ft 2 in (1.88 m), 185 lb (84 kg), he batted right-handed and threw left-handed.

== College career ==
Krueger began his college career at Grand Rapids Junior College, where he earned All-American honors, before transferring to Michigan State University for the 1970 season. He had a 5–3 season in his one season for the Spartans and was signed by the Boston Red Sox in 1971.

== Professional Career ==
After four seasons in the minors (he missed all of 1972 with back issues), Kreuger made his Major League debut with the Red Sox on September 6, 1975. Over the next two seasons he bounced between the majors and minors, memorably taking a no-hitter into the seventh inning against the Milwaukee Brewers on September 21, 1976, before being traded by Boston to the Cleveland for Frank Duffy during spring training in 1978. He began the season with the Indians, pitching in six games before being sent back down to Cleveland AAA affiliate, the Portland Beavers.

Krueger pitched for the Yomiuri Giants of Japan in 1979 and then in the Puerto Rican league for the Criollos de Caguas before retiring from playing. His final Major League stats were a 2–2 record over 17 games (four starts) and a 4.47 ERA.

== Post baseball career ==
Following his playing career, Kreuger worked in real estate. He later was the head baseball coach at Cornerstone College (1996–97) and then operated Kreuger’s Baseball School in Hudsonville, Michigan.

Kreuger died in Hudsonville on May 7, 2026, at the age of 77.
