= Steve Barr =

American baseball player (1951-2024)

- Pitcher
- Born: September 8, 1951; St. Louis, Missouri
- Died: January 31, 2024 (aged 72); Bartow, Florida
- Batted: Left Threw: Left

MLB debut
- October 1, 1974, for the Boston Red Sox

Last MLB appearance
- September 29, 1976, for the Texas Rangers

MLB statistics
- Win–loss record: 3–7
- Earned run average: 5.16
- Strikeouts: 32
- Innings pitched: 832/3
- Stats at Baseball Reference

Teams
- Boston Red Sox (1974–1975); Texas Rangers (1976)

Steven Charles Barr (September 8, 1951 – January 31, 2024) was a retired American professional baseball player. A left-handed pitcher, he worked in 24 games in Major League Baseball between 1974 and 1976 for the Boston Red Sox and the Texas Rangers. He was listed as 6 feet 4 inches (1.93 m) tall and 200 pounds (91 kg).

== Early life ==
Barr was born in St. Louis but grew up in Southern California.

== Career ==
After graduating from Carson High School in Carson, California, he was picked by Boston in the seventh round of the 1969 Major League Baseball draft. In 1974, his sixth season in the Red Sox farm system, he won 16 games, lost eight, and posted a 2.45 earned run average and 15 complete games with the Double-A Bristol Red Sox. Barr led the Eastern League in games won was named to the All-Star team. Boston recalled him to their active roster that September and he started the penultimate game of the 1974 season. In his MLB debut, Barr threw a complete game 7–4 victory against the Cleveland Indians, scattering seven hits and six bases on balls.

He began 1975 with Triple-A Pawtucket, and was given a three-game trial with the pennant-bound Red Sox in July. He made three appearances, including two starts in which he was treated roughly. surrendering ten hits, four walks and nine runs in only six innings pitched—but only two of the runs were earned. He returned to Pawtucket, where he posted a good 2.92 ERA despite a win–loss record of only 6–12. Then, on November 17, he was included in one of the off-season's blockbuster trades when he was sent to the Rangers with outfielder Juan Beníquez for future Baseball Hall of Fame pitcher Ferguson Jenkins.

Barr then spent all of 1976 on the Ranger roster, appearing in 20 games, including ten as a starting pitcher. In his first start, April 13 against the defending American League West champion Oakland Athletics, Barr threw a complete game, four-hit, 3–1 victory, striking out seven. He was credited with two more complete games that season, but he struggled to a 2–6 mark with a poor 5.59 earned run average. He was selected by the Seattle Mariners with the 54th pick in the 1976 Major League Baseball expansion draft, but did not the M's big-league roster and spent both 1977 and 1978 in Triple-A before retiring from baseball after ten pro seasons.

In his 24 MLB games pitched, Barr allowed 88 hits and 57 bases on balls in 832/3 total innings pitched. He fanned 32, and was credited with four complete games in 13 total starts. He is the uncle of pitcher Ryan Madson.

Barr died January 31, 2024.
