= Nick Colosi =

Italian-American baseball umpire (1925-2005)

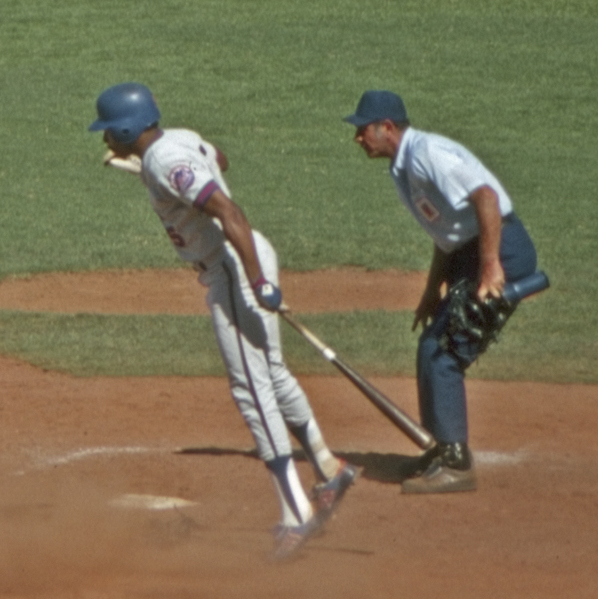
- Colosi (right) umpiring a game at Dodger Stadium in 1978
- Born: November 27, 1925; Sicily, Italy
- Died: February 25, 2005 (aged 79); New York City, U.S.
- Occupation: Umpire
- Years active: 1968-1982
- Employer: National League

Nicholas Colosi (November 27, 1925 – February 25, 2005) was an Italian-American Major League Baseball umpire in the National League starting in 1968 until his retirement in 1982. During his career, Colosi appeared in three National League Championship Series (1970, 1974, and 1978), two World Series (1975 and 1981), and two All-Star Games (1971 and 1980). Colosi was also the home plate umpire for John Candelaria's no-hitter on August 9, 1976. Colosi wore uniform number 1 for most of his career, the last NL umpire to wear number 1, as it was retired later for Hall-of-Fame umpire Bill Klem.

Colosi died on February 25, 2005, in New York City, New York at the age of 79.
