= Dave Phillips (umpire) =

American baseball umpire (born 1943)

- Born: David Robert Phillips; October 8, 1943 (age 82); St. Louis, Missouri, U.S.
- Occupation: MLB umpire
- Years active: 1971–2002
- Height: 5 ft 11 in (180 cm)

David Robert Phillips (born October 8, 1943) is an American retired umpire, first with the American League from 1971 to 1999, then with both leagues from 2001 to 2002. Phillips wore uniform number 7 when the American League adopted uniform numbers for its umpires in 1980, and retained the number when the staffs merged in 2000.

== Umpiring career ==
Phillips umpired in three American League Division Series (1981, 1997, and 1998), six American League Championship Series (1974, 1978, 1983, 1985—crew chief, 1989—crew chief, and 1995—crew chief), four World Series (1976, 1982, 1987—crew chief, and 1993—crew chief) and two All-Star Games (1977 and 1990).

In 1975, Phillips became one of the first three American League umpires to switch to the inside chest protector along with Don Denkinger and Merle Anthony

=== Notable games ===
Phillips served during six no-hitters (Nolan Ryan's second no-hitter (July 15, 1973, first base), Jim Bibby (July 30, 1973, first base), the combined no-hitter of Vida Blue, Glenn Abbott, Paul Lindblad and Rollie Fingers (September 28, 1975, first base), Randy Johnson (June 2, 1990, second base), Bret Saberhagen (August 26, 1991, second base), and Scott Erickson (April 27, 1994, first base)).

He was the crew chief during the 1979 Disco Demolition Night at Comiskey Park, in which the Chicago White Sox were ordered to forfeit the second game of a scheduled doubleheader to the visiting Detroit Tigers.

In August 1982, Phillips ejected Seattle Mariners pitcher Gaylord Perry for throwing an illegal pitch, the first such ejection of Perry's career.

On August 18, 1983, Phillips was one of the umpires who worked the continuation of a game between the New York Yankees and the Kansas City Royals which originally ended when George Brett was called out for excessive pine tar on his bat. Following a successful protest by the Royals, the game was resumed to the point of Brett's home run. Phillips provided an affidavit to Yankee manager Billy Martin stating that the runners who scored on that home run touched all the bases.

In the leadup to the 1993 World Series, the umpires for the series, as crew chiefed by Phillips "expressed concern" of the idea to use the home-plate overhead camera for their coverage of the series. CBS did not cave in and used the camera for the whole series to look at close calls at the plate.

On July 15, 1994, Phillips was the plate umpire when he decided to take Albert Belle's bat and have it placed in the umpire's locker room, after Chicago White Sox manager Gene Lamont alleged that the bat was corked. As the Indians were aware that Belle's bat was corked, Cleveland pitcher Jason Grimsley managed to get into the umpire's locker room and put a different bat in place of Belle's. However, the trick did not work as the new bat had Paul Sorrento's name on it, and Belle received a seven-game suspension.

== Post career ==
In 2004, Phillips wrote a book with Rob Rains titled Center Field on Fire (after Disco Demolition Night), which chronicled his over thirty-year career in major and minor league baseball.

== See also ==
- List of Major League Baseball umpires (disambiguation)
