= 1975 American League Championship Series =

7th edition of Major League Baseball's American League Championship Series

Team (Wins)	Managers	Season
Boston Red Sox (3)	Darrell Johnson	95–65 (.594); GA: 4 1/2
Oakland Athletics (0)	Alvin Dark	98–64 (.605); GA: 7
- Dates: October 4–7
- Umpires: Don Denkinger; Lou DiMuro; Bill Kunkel; Ron Luciano; Jim Evans; Hank Morgenweck

Broadcast
- Television: NBC; KPIX (OAK); WSBK-TV (BOS)
- TV announcers: NBC: Curt Gowdy and Tony Kubek (in Boston); Joe Garagiola and Maury Wills (in Oakland); KPIX: Monte Moore and Bob Waller; WSBK-TV: Dick Stockton and Ken Harrelson

The 1975 American League Championship Series was a semifinal matchup in Major League Baseball's 1975 postseason between the Boston Red Sox and the three-time defending World Series champion Oakland Athletics for the right to advance to the World Series. The Red Sox swept the series in three games to win their first AL pennant in eight years, which ended Oakland's pursuit of a fourth consecutive World Series title.

== Background ==
During the regular season, the Red Sox posted a 95–65 (.594) record to win their first American League East division title, while the "Swingin' A's" went 98–64 (.605) to take the American League West for the fifth consecutive season.

The Red Sox had experienced players such as Carl Yastrzemski, Carlton Fisk, and Dwight Evans, and two sensational rookies – Fred Lynn and Jim Rice. Lynn took most of the headlines by playing a flawless center field, hitting .331 with 21 home runs and 105 RBIs, and was the first major league player to win the MVP and Rookie of the Year awards in the same season. Despite suffering a broken wrist in late September, Rice finished with a .309 average, 22 homers, and 102 RBIs.

== Summary ==
=== Oakland Athletics vs. Boston Red Sox ===
Boston won the series, 3–0.

Game	Date	Score	Location	Time	Attendance
1	October 4	Oakland Athletics – 1, Boston Red Sox – 7	Fenway Park	2:40	35,578
2	October 5	Oakland Athletics – 3, Boston Red Sox – 6	Fenway Park	2:27	35,578
3	October 7	Boston Red Sox – 5, Oakland Athletics – 3	Oakland-Alameda County Coliseum	2:30	49,358

== Game summaries ==
=== Game 1 ===
October 4, 1975 1:00 pm (ET) at Fenway Park in Boston, Massachusetts 70 °F (21 °C) clear
Team	1	2	3	4	5	6	7	8	9	R	H	E
Oakland	0	0	0	0	0	0	0	1	0	1	3	4
Boston	2	0	0	0	0	0	5	0	X	7	8	3
WP: Luis Tiant (1–0) LP: Ken Holtzman (0–1)

Boston starter Luis Tiant allowed just one run on three hits to defeat the Athletics, 7–1, in the ALCS opener. Tiant struck out eight and walked three in a complete game effort, retiring the side in order in four innings. Juan Beníquez went 2-for-4 with an RBI and a run scored, Fred Lynn ended 1-for-4 with two RBIs, and Carlton Fisk went 1-for-4 with two runs scored for the Red Sox. Oakland starter Ken Holtzman was saddled with the loss by yielding five hits and four runs (two unearned) with four strikeouts and a walk in 6 1/3 innings of work.

=== Game 2 ===
October 5, 1975 4:00 pm (ET) at Fenway Park in Boston, Massachusetts 61 °F (16 °C) overcast
Team	1	2	3	4	5	6	7	8	9	R	H	E
Oakland	2	0	0	1	0	0	0	0	0	3	10	0
Boston	0	0	0	3	0	1	1	1	X	6	12	0
WP: Roger Moret (1–0) LP: Rollie Fingers (0–1) Sv: Dick Drago (1); Home runs: OAK: Reggie Jackson (1); BOS: Carl Yastrzemski (1), Rico Petrocelli (1)

Carl Yastrzemski hit a two-run home run to lead the Red Sox past the Athletics, 6–3, in Game 2. Boston starter Reggie Cleveland was solid through five innings, allowing three runs on five hits with two strikeouts and one walk. Rico Petrocelli also homered, Carlton Fisk went 2-for-4 with an RBI and a run scored, and Fred Lynn went 2-for-4 with one RBI for the Red Sox. Athletics starter Vida Blue lasted three innings and gave up just three runs on six hits. The win went to Roger Moret, who tossed one scoreless inning of relief, and Dick Drago worked the final three innings to close out the contest. Rollie Fingers took the loss, allowing three runs on five hits over four innings. Reggie Jackson hit a two-run homer and Sal Bando went 4-for-4 with two doubles and a run for the Athletics.

=== Game 3 ===
October 7, 1975 5:15 pm (PT) at Oakland-Alameda County Coliseum in Oakland, California 61 °F (16 °C) mostly cloudy
Team	1	2	3	4	5	6	7	8	9	R	H	E
Boston	0	0	0	1	3	0	0	1	0	5	11	1
Oakland	0	0	0	0	0	1	0	2	0	3	6	1
WP: Rick Wise (1–0) LP: Ken Holtzman (0–2) Sv: Dick Drago (2)

After three consecutive championships, the Athletics' dynasty came to an end, as the Red Sox took the third game, 5-3, to sweep the series, their first postseason series win since the 1918 World Series. Boston starter Rick Wise allowed three runs (two unearned) on six hits in 7 1/3 innings of work. Both Denny Doyle and Carlton Fisk collected two hits with one run and an RBI, and Rick Burleson went 2-for-4 with one run scored to pace the Red Sox. On just two days' rest, Ken Holtzman started for Oakland and was tagged for four runs on seven hits in just 4 2/3 innings to take his second loss in the series. Dick Drago earned the save for pitching 1 2/3 innings of shutout ball for Boston while Carl Yastrzemski made two great defensive plays in left field and collected two hits. Sal Bando went 2-for-4 with two RBIs while Reggie Jackson went 2-for-4 with one RBI for the Athletics.

This game, and Game 3 of the National League Championship Series, were the first LCS games ever played at night; both were regionally televised by NBC.

== Composite box ==
1975 ALCS (3–0): Boston Red Sox over Oakland A's

Team	1	2	3	4	5	6	7	8	9	R	H	E
Boston Red Sox	2	0	0	4	3	1	6	2	0	18	31	4
Oakland A's	2	0	0	1	0	1	0	3	0	7	19	5
Total attendance: 120,514 Average attendance: 40,171

== Series Statistics ==
=== Boston Red Sox ===
==== Batting ====
Note: GP=Games played; AB=At bats; R=Runs; H=Hits; 2B=Doubles; 3B=Triples; HR=Home runs; RBI=Runs batted in; BB=Walks; AVG=Batting average; OBP=On base percentage; SLG=Slugging percentage

Player	GP	AB	R	H	2B	3B	HR	RBI	BB	AVG	OBP	SLG	Reference
Juan Beníquez	3	12	2	3	1	0	0	1	0	.250	.250	.333	
Rick Burleson	3	9	2	2	2	0	0	1	1	.444	.500	.667	
Cecil Cooper	3	10	0	4	2	0	0	1	0	.400	.400	.600	
Denny Doyle	3	11	3	3	0	0	0	2	0	.273	.250	.273	
Dwight Evans	3	10	1	1	1	0	0	0	1	.100	.182	.200	
Carlton Fisk	3	12	4	5	1	0	0	2	0	.417	.417	.500	
Fred Lynn	3	11	1	4	1	0	0	3	0	.364	.364	.455	
Rico Petrocelli	3	12	1	2	0	0	1	2	0	.167	.167	.417	
Carl Yastrzemski	3	11	4	5	1	0	1	2	1	.455	.500	.818	

==== Pitching ====
Note: G=Games Played; GS=Games Started; IP=Innings Pitched; H=Hits; BB=Walks; R=Runs; ER=Earned Runs; SO=Strikeouts; W=Wins; L=Losses; SV=Saves; ERA=Earned Run Average

Player	G	GS	IP	H	BB	R	ER	SO	W	L	SV	ERA	Reference
Reggie Cleveland	1	1	5	7	1	3	3	2	0	0	0	5.40	
Dick Drago	2	0	4 2/3	2	1	0	0	2	0	0	2	0.00	
Roger Moret	1	0	1	1	1	0	0	0	1	0	0	0.00	
Luis Tiant	1	1	9	3	3	1	0	8	1	0	0	0.00	
Rick Wise	1	1	7 1/3	6	3	3	2	2	1	0	0	2.45	

=== Oakland Athletics ===
==== Batting ====
Note: GP=Games played; AB=At bats; R=Runs; H=Hits; 2B=Doubles; 3B=Triples; HR=Home runs; RBI=Runs batted in; BB=Walks; AVG=Batting average; OBP=On base percentage; SLG=Slugging percentage

Player	GP	AB	R	H	2B	3B	HR	RBI	BB	AVG	OBP	SLG	Reference
Sal Bando	3	12	1	6	2	0	0	2	0	.500	.500	.667	
Bert Campaneris	3	11	1	0	0	0	0	0	1	.000	.083	.000	
Ray Fosse	1	2	0	0	0	0	0	0	0	.000	.000	.000	
Phil Garner	3	5	0	0	0	0	0	0	0	.000	.000	.000	
Tommy Harper	1	0	0	0	0	0	0	0	1	─	1.000	─	
Jim Holt	3	3	0	1	1	0	0	0	0	.333	.333	.667	
Don Hopkins	1	1	0	0	0	0	0	0	0	.000	.000	.000	
Reggie Jackson	3	12	1	5	0	0	1	3	0	.417	.417	.667	
Bill North	3	10	0	0	0	0	0	1	2	.000	.167	.000	
Joe Rudi	3	12	1	3	2	0	0	0	0	.250	.250	.417	
Gene Tenace	3	9	0	0	0	0	0	0	3	.000	.250	.000	
César Tovar	2	2	2	1	0	0	0	0	1	.500	.667	.500	
Claudell Washington	3	12	1	3	1	0	0	1	0	.250	.250	.333	
Billy Williams	3	7	0	0	0	0	0	0	1	.000	.125	.000	

==== Pitching ====
Note: G=Games Played; GS=Games Started; IP=Innings Pitched; H=Hits; BB=Walks; R=Runs; ER=Earned Runs; SO=Strikeouts; W=Wins; L=Losses; SV=Saves; ERA=Earned Run Average

Player	G	GS	IP	H	BB	R	ER	SO	W	L	SV	ERA	Reference
Glenn Abbott	1	0	1	0	0	0	0	0	0	0	0	0.00	
Vida Blue	1	1	3	6	0	3	3	2	0	0	0	9.00	
Dick Bosman	1	0	0 1/3	0	0	0	0	0	0	0	0	0.00	
Rollie Fingers	1	0	4	5	1	3	3	3	0	1	0	6.75	
Ken Holtzman	2	2	11	12	1	8	5	7	0	2	0	4.09	
Paul Lindblad	2	0	4 2/3	5	1	3	1	0	0	0	0	1.93	
Jim Todd	3	0	1	3	0	1	0	0	0	0	0	0.00	

== Aftermath ==
On June 15, 1976, Oakland Athletics owner Charlie Finley, with the dawn of free agency looming looking to tear his dynasty apart, sold Rollie Fingers and Joe Rudi to the Red Sox and Vida Blue to the Yankees over the course of twelve days. In the words of Sports Illustrated writer Ron Fimrite, it was "the biggest sale of human flesh in the history of sports." The deals would first be frozen, then overturned by MLB commissioner Bowie Kuhn, citing his "best interests of baseball" powers. Ultimately, Finley got nothing as most of his players left for free agency that summer.

After the 1976 season, the A's lost Gene Tenace, Rollie Fingers, Sal Bando, Joe Rudi, Don Baylor and Bert Campaneris to free agency. This, combined with the loss of Catfish Hunter two years earlier and the trade of Reggie Jackson and Ken Holtzman to the Baltimore Orioles for Mike Torrez, Paul Mitchell and Don Baylor, stripped the team of almost all of the talent from the 1972–1974 World Series-winning teams. The final nail in the coffin was the trade of pitcher Vida Blue to the San Francisco Giants for seven players and $300,000 just before the start of the 1978 season. The A's did not make the postseason again until 1981, which was the year after Finley sold the team for $12 million.

After his trade to Baltimore in 1976, Jackson had not signed a contract and threatened to sit out the season; he reported to the Orioles four weeks later, and made his first plate appearance on May 2, nearly four weeks after the start of the season. Orioles' ace pitcher Jim Palmer later wrote on Jackson's lone season in Baltimore, "I would say Reggie Jackson was arrogant. But the word arrogant isn't arrogant enough." Jackson later signed the largest free-agent contract at the time with the New York Yankees after the season and helped lead New York to back-to-back championships in 1977 and 1978; Catfish Hunter was also on these Yankees teams.

This was the first of four Athletics-Red Sox playoff match-ups. The Red Sox won in 1975 and 2003, while the Athletics swept the Red Sox in 1988 and 1990.
