= George Maloney =

American baseball umpire (1928-2003)

- Born: George Patrick Maloney; February 28, 1928; New York, New York, U.S.
- Died: July 29, 2003 (aged 75); Barstow, California, U.S.
- Occupation: Umpire
- Years active: 1969-1983
- Employer: American League

George Patrick Maloney (February 28, 1928 – July 29, 2003) was an American professional baseball umpire who worked in the American League from 1969 to 1983, wearing uniform number 28 when the American League adopted them for umpires in 1980. Maloney umpired 2,159 major league games in his 15-year career. He umpired in one World Series (1975), three All-Star Games (1974, 1979 and 1983, becoming the last AL umpire to wear the outside balloon protector favored by AL umpires in All-Star competition), three American League Championship Series (1973, 1976 and 1980), and the 1981 American League Division Series.

== Later life ==
After retirement, Maloney served as commissioner of the South Florida College Baseball Umpires Association from 1986 to 1993. He then worked for the Umpire Development Program and its successor, the Professional Baseball Umpires Corporation (PBUC), from 1996 until his death. In that role, he evaluated and trained minor league umpires.

== Death ==
Maloney died in Barstow, California, on July 29, 2003. He died while traveling as an observer of umpires for the PBUC.

== See also ==
- List of Major League Baseball umpires (disambiguation)
