= Denny Doyle =

American baseball player (1944–2022)

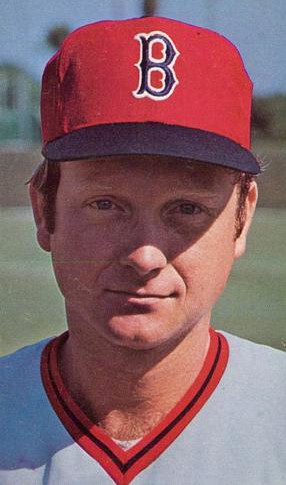
- Doyle, c. 1976
- Second baseman
- Born: January 17, 1944; Jefferson County, Kentucky, U.S.
- Died: December 20, 2022 (aged 78); Winter Garden, Florida, U.S.
- Batted: Left Threw: Right

MLB debut
- April 7, 1970, for the Philadelphia Phillies

Last MLB appearance
- September 30, 1977, for the Boston Red Sox

MLB statistics
- Batting average: .250
- Home runs: 16
- Runs batted in: 237
- Stats at Baseball Reference

Teams
- Philadelphia Phillies (1970–1973); California Angels (1974–1975); Boston Red Sox (1975–1977)

Robert Dennis Doyle (January 17, 1944 – December 20, 2022) was an American professional baseball second baseman who played in Major League Baseball (MLB) for the Philadelphia Phillies, California Angels, and Boston Red Sox. Listed at 5 feet 9 inches (1.75 m) and 175 pounds (79 kg), he batted left-handed and threw right-handed.

== Career ==
Doyle attended Morehead State University where he played baseball and basketball. After not being selected in the 1965 MLB draft, he signed as a free agent with the Philadelphia Phillies. He then remained at Morehead to complete his degree, playing in the Basin League and Central Illinois Collegiate League. Doyle began his professional career in 1966 with the Class A Spartanburg Phillies and advanced through the Phillies' farm system, reaching the Triple-A level in 1969 with the Eugene Emeralds of the Pacific Coast League.

Doyle debuted in MLB in 1970, when he played in 112 games for the Phillies. He remained with the team through the 1973 season, appearing in a total of 446 games with Philadelphia, posting a .240 batting average with nine home runs and 92 runs batted in (RBIs). While playing for Philadelphia, Doyle was involved in two notable near no-hitters. On April 18, 1970, Doyle registered a lead-off single in the first inning against Nolan Ryan of the New York Mets, which was the only hit Ryan allowed in a complete game effort. On July 18, 1972, Doyle broke up a no-hit bid by Steve Arlin of the San Diego Padres with a two-out single in the ninth inning. With two strikes on Doyle, Padres manager Don Zimmer had his third baseman continue to play shallow to guard against a possible bunt; Doyle then chopped a single that went over the fielder's head. No Padres pitcher tossed a no-hitter until Joe Musgrove in 2021; this was the closest any came to pitching one before then.

Doyle was sent from the Phillies to the Angels for Aurelio Monteagudo and Chris Coletta at the Winter Meetings on December 6, 1973, completing a transaction from four months earlier on August 14 when Philadelphia purchased Billy Grabarkewitz's contract from California. He played 147 games for the Angels in 1974 and eight games in 1975, batting .255 with one home run and 34 RBIs.

In June 1975, Doyle was traded to the Boston Red Sox. That season, Doyle batted a career-high .310 in 89 games with the Red Sox. He also had a league-best 22-game hitting streak. He was Boston's starting second baseman in the 1975 American League Championship Series and 1975 World Series, the only postseason appearances of his MLB career.

Doyle is perhaps best remembered for his role in Game Six of the World Series versus the Cincinnati Reds, which featured Carlton Fisk's dramatic twelfth-inning home run that has become one of baseball's most iconic highlights. In the bottom of the ninth inning, the score was tied, 6–6, and the bases were loaded with no outs with Doyle on third base. Batter Fred Lynn lifted a fly ball to short left field. After Reds left fielder George Foster made the catch, Doyle tagged up and attempted to score the winning run. He was thrown out at home plate, which inadvertently helped set the stage for Fisk's subsequent game-winning home run. After the game, Red Sox third-base coach Don Zimmer told the press, "I was yelling 'no, no, no' and with the crowd noise, he (Doyle) thought I was saying 'go, go, go.'" In Game 7, Doyle tried to turn a double play to close out the sixth inning after a grounder went from the shortstop to Doyle at second base, but his throw to first base, influenced by a sliding Pete Rose, ended up sailing into the dugout to prolong the inning—the next batter, Tony Pérez, hit a home run to cut Boston's lead to 3–2 in a game the Red Sox went on to lose, 4–3. In a World Series that included five future Hall of Fame players, (Note: Boston: Carlton Fisk and Carl Yastrzemski; Jim Rice was injured and did not play. Cincinnati: Johnny Bench, Joe Morgan, and Tony Pérez; manager Sparky Anderson is also a Hall of Fame inductee.) Doyle was the only player on either team to hit safely in all seven games.

Doyle returned to Boston for 1976 and 1977, appearing in a total of 343 Red Sox games across three seasons while batting .261 with six home runs and 111 RBIs.

Overall, Doyle played in 944 MLB games between 1970 and 1977, finishing with a career .250 average along with 16 home runs and 237 RBIs. Defensively, he played 912 games as a second baseman, recording a .977 fielding percentage. He also made seven appearances as a third baseman, and four appearances as a shortstop.

== Personal life ==
Doyle had two younger brothers, twins Brian Doyle and Blake Doyle, both of whom also played professional baseball. Doyle served as the president of Doyle Baseball Camps, which he founded in 1978 along with his brothers. Doyle died on December 20, 2022, at the age of 78.
