= Kim Andrew (baseball) =

American baseball player (born 1953)

- Second baseman
- Born: November 14, 1953 (age 72); Glendale, California, U.S.
- Batted: Right Threw: Right

MLB debut
- April 16, 1975, for the Boston Red Sox

Last MLB appearance
- April 21, 1975, for the Boston Red Sox

MLB statistics
- Batting average: .500
- Hits: 1
- Runs Batted Ins: 0
- Stats at Baseball Reference

Teams
- Boston Red Sox (1975)

Kim Darrell Andrew (born November 14, 1953) is an American former second baseman in Major League Baseball who played for the Boston Red Sox in the 1975 season. He batted and threw right-handed. After his short career in the Major Leagues, Andrew later played for Bollate, a professional baseball team in Milan, Italy for the 1977 season.

Andrew grew up in the greater Los Angeles area, where his mother is credited as having encouraged him to pursue various athletic competition. While attending James Monroe High School he played shortstop and right field, but when drafted by the Dodgers, he was switched to second base. However, he did not sign with the Dodgers when they offered him only $5,000. He instead signed with the Orioles in 1972 as an amateur free agent just weeks before the draft. He was selected by the Red Sox from the Orioles in the Rule 5 Draft on December 2, 1974. He later appeared in two major league games for the Red Sox early in the season, on April 16 and 21. Andrew hit 1-for-2 for a .500 average in those two game played.
