= Hank Morgenweck =

American baseball umpire (1929-2007)

Morgenweck

Henry Charles Morgenweck (April 9, 1929 – August 7, 2007) was an American umpire in Major League Baseball who worked in the American League from 1972 to 1975.

He made his major league debut officiating in the first game of the 1970 National League Championship Series on October 3, when an umpires' strike forced the league to use minor league baseball umpires for the first game of the series before the regular umpires returned for Game 2.

== Notable games ==
Morgenweck was behind the plate, calling balls and strikes, when Nolan Ryan pitched a 1–0 no-hitter at Anaheim Stadium against the Baltimore Orioles on June 1, 1975. It was Ryan's fourth no-hitter, tying the record held by Sandy Koufax. Morganweck was also the home plate umpire for Dick Bosman's no-hitter on July 19, 1974.

He was part of the umpiring crew in the 1975 American League Championship Series, but was not re-signed by the American League after the season ended.

== Death ==
He died of cancer at age 78. Morgenweck was a resident of Teaneck, New Jersey.
