= Deron Johnson =

American baseball player (1938–1992)

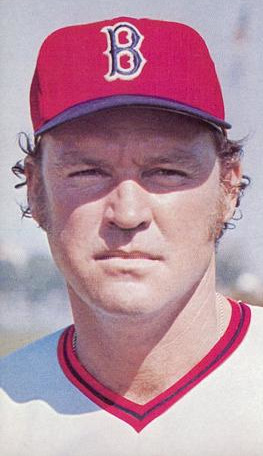
- First baseman / Third baseman / Left fielder / Designated hitter
- Born: July 17, 1938; San Diego, California, U.S.
- Died: April 23, 1992 (aged 53); Poway, California, U.S.
- Batted: Right Threw: Right

MLB debut
- September 20, 1960, for the New York Yankees

Last MLB appearance
- May 28, 1976, for the Boston Red Sox

MLB statistics
- Batting average: .244
- Home runs: 245
- Runs batted in: 923
- Stats at Baseball Reference

Teams
- As player: New York Yankees (1960–1961); Kansas City Athletics (1961–1962); Cincinnati Reds (1964–1967); Atlanta Braves (1968); Philadelphia Phillies (1969–1973); Oakland Athletics (1973–1974); Milwaukee Brewers (1974); Boston Red Sox (1974); Chicago White Sox (1975); Boston Red Sox (1975–1976); As coach: California Angels (1979–1980); New York Mets (1981); Philadelphia Phillies (1982–1984); Seattle Mariners (1985–1986); Chicago White Sox (1987); California Angels (1989–1992)

Career highlights and awards
- World Series champion (1973); NL RBI leader (1965)

Deron Roger Johnson (July 17, 1938 – April 23, 1992) was an American professional baseball infielder, outfielder, designated hitter, and coach, who played in Major League Baseball (MLB) for the New York Yankees, Kansas City/Oakland Athletics, Cincinnati Reds, Atlanta Braves, Philadelphia Phillies, Milwaukee Brewers, Boston Red Sox, and Chicago White Sox, over the course of his 16-year big league playing career. While an active player, Johnson stood 6 feet 2 inches (1.88 m) tall, weighing 200 pounds (91 kg). He batted and threw right-handed.

Johnson later served as an MLB hitting coach for 12 seasons with the California Angels (1979–1980; 1989–1992), New York Mets (1981), Phillies (1982–1984), Seattle Mariners (1985–1986), and White Sox (1987). He was still an active member of the California coaching staff when diagnosed with lung cancer, which claimed his life on April 23, 1992, at the age of 53.

== Playing career ==
Johnson first appeared in a major league game on September 20, 1960. The 22-year-old was called upon to pinch hit in the ninth inning of a 1–1 tie between New York and Washington, facing Senators southpaw Hal Woodeshick. Mickey Mantle flied out to right and Bill Skowron doubled. Johnson advanced Skowron to third with a flyout to center. The Yankees won 2–1 in the 11th inning. He got his first two career hits on October 2, in the Yankees' last game of the regular season, an 8–7 win over the Red Sox at Yankee Stadium. Johnson batted twice in the game—the first resulted in a fifth-inning double off Red Sox pitcher Jerry Casale, and in the seventh inning he singled off Arnold Earley.

Johnson's contract was purchased from Kansas City by the Cincinnati Reds on April 5, 1963. Playing for Triple-A San Diego, he topped the Pacific Coast League with 33 home runs, tied for fifth with 91 runs batted in (RBI), and was picked as first baseman on the PCL All-Star team. 1964 was his first full season in the major leagues with the Reds where he posted a .273 average with 21 home runs and 79 RBI.

The 1965 season with the Cincinnati Reds was one of the best of Johnson's career, as he hit .287, hit 32 home runs, and drove in an MLB-leading 130 runs. Rose was quoted in 1983, "I had never seen anyone hit the ball harder than Deron Johnson." He finished fourth in NL MVP voting.

While playing for the Philadelphia Phillies in 1971, Johnson clubbed a career-high 34 homers and drove in over 90 runs. Further proof of Johnson's long-ball skill was evident on July 10 and 11, as he belted four consecutive home runs against the Montreal Expos, three of them coming on the 11th. Johnson hit .300 in the 1973 World Series while playing with the Oakland A's. He opened 1974 with the A's, but on June 24, he was released on waivers to the Milwaukee Brewers. On September 7, Johnson was sold to the Boston Red Sox, who were in the middle of a pennant race they ultimately lost. The following April he signed with the White Sox.

In 148 games for the White Sox, Johnson hit 18 home runs, and drove in 72 RBI. On September 21, after Jim Rice had been injured earlier in the day, the Red Sox once again needed supplemental power and reacquired Johnson. Johnson's last home run of his career came on September 27, 1975, off of Indians pitcher Rick Waits at Fenway Park.

In 1,765 games over 16 seasons, Johnson posted a .244 batting average with 706 runs, 247 doubles, 33 triples, 245 home runs, 923 RBI, 585 walks, .311 on-base percentage and .420 slugging percentage. He finished his career with a .987 fielding percentage playing primarily at first base but also played at third base and the outfield. In the 1973 postseason, he batted .200 (4-for-20) with no runs, home runs or RBI.

== Personal life & legacy ==
Johnson was a baseball and football star at San Diego High School. He was offered numerous college football scholarships but opted to sign with the Yankees. In 1979, Johnson was inducted by the San Diego Hall of Champions into the Breitbard Hall of Fame. From 1958 to 1959, he served for six months in the U.S. Army under the Reserve Training Program, the first of several military stints during his baseball career.

After retiring as a major league player, along with coaching in the majors, Johnson owned a construction company in San Diego and operated a 40-acre cattle ranch. When he died of lung cancer in 1992, he was survived by his wife and three children. His son Dominick pitched in the minor leagues. Former teammate Gary Nolan named Johnson as one of the three nicest MLB players that he got to be around during his career, along with Willie Stargell and Hank Aaron.

== See also ==
- List of Major League Baseball career home run leaders
- List of Major League Baseball annual runs batted in leaders
