= Rick Burleson =

American baseball player (born 1951)

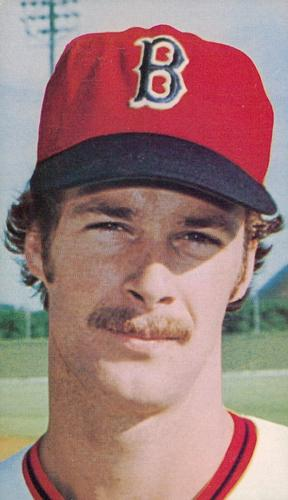
- Shortstop
- Born: April 29, 1951 (age 74); Lynwood, California, U.S.
- Batted: Right Threw: Right

MLB debut
- May 4, 1974, for the Boston Red Sox

Last MLB appearance
- July 8, 1987, for the Baltimore Orioles

MLB statistics
- Batting average: .273
- Home runs: 50
- Runs batted in: 449
- Stats at Baseball Reference

Teams
- As player: Boston Red Sox (1974–1980); California Angels (1981–1984, 1986); Baltimore Orioles (1987); As coach: Oakland Athletics (1991); Boston Red Sox (1992–1993); California Angels (1995–1996)

Career highlights and awards
- 4× All-Star (1977–1979, 1981); Gold Glove Award (1979); Silver Slugger Award (1981); Boston Red Sox Hall of Fame

Richard Paul Burleson (born April 29, 1951), nicknamed "Rooster", is an American former Major League Baseball shortstop. Burleson, who played for three American League teams over 13 seasons, was an intense ballplayer. Former Boston Red Sox teammate Bill Lee once said of Burleson, "Some guys didn't like to lose, but Rick got angry if the score was even tied."

== Early life, family and education ==
Burleson graduated from Warren High School, in Downey, California. He attended Cerritos Junior College for one year.

== Minor leagues ==
Burleson was drafted by the Minnesota Twins in the 1970 Major League Baseball draft upon graduation from high school, but he did not sign. After a year of junior college, the Boston Red Sox selected Burleson #5 overall during the January secondary phase of the 1970 Major League Baseball draft.

Burleson spent his first professional season with the Winter Haven Red Sox of the Florida State League. He batted only .220, and committed 38 errors at short. In 1972, Burleson was named an Eastern League All-Star while assigned to the Pawtucket Red Sox. Following Luis Aparicio's retirement, he battled Mario Guerrero for the starting shortstop job in spring training 1974.

== Boston Red Sox ==
Though Guerrero won the job, Burleson still managed to earn a call to the major leagues by May. On May 4, Burleson tied a major league record by committing three errors in his major league debut, and was replaced by Guerrero at short by the end of the game. Despite the inauspicious start to his career, he would eventually end up being considered among the best defensive shortstops of his generation, earning a Gold Glove Award in 1979.

Burleson was batting .298 with one home run, 28 runs batted in and 45 runs scored to be elected the starting American League shortstop at the 1977 Major League Baseball All-Star Game. For the season, Burleson batted .293 with three home runs, 52 RBIs and 80 runs scored, and was second to Jim Rice among team hit leaders with 194 base hits.

Burleson received All-Star nods in 1978 and 1979 as well. In 1979, Burleson batted .278, scored 90 runs and earned the AL's Gold Glove Award at short to earn his first of two consecutive Thomas A. Yawkey Awards as the Most Valuable Player of the Boston Red Sox. He batted .278 with a career high eight home runs and 89 runs scored, and set a major league record for double plays by a shortstop in a single season with 147 en route to winning the award the following season. From 1975 to 1980, he played in at least 145 games and got at least 140 hits each season.

== California Angels ==
Burleson was traded along with Butch Hobson from the Red Sox to the Angels for Carney Lansford, Rick Miller and Mark Clear on December 10, 1980. His first season with the Angels, he batted .293 with 33 RBIs and 53 runs scored while playing 109 of the Angels' 110 games during the strike shortened season. He won the Silver Slugger Award as the best hitting shortstop in the American League and the Gene Autry Award as the MVP of the California Angels.

A year later he injured his throwing arm, appearing in only 51 games over the next three seasons, and missing the entire 1985 season. He returned in 1986 to bat .284 with five home runs, 29 RBIs and 35 runs scored in 93 games for the American League Western division winning Angels. Along with backing up Dick Schofield at short, he appeared in 38 games as a designated hitter, and played second and third base for the first time since his rookie season.

Following the season, he signed as a free agent with the Baltimore Orioles. He batted .209 in 55 games as a second baseman for the Orioles in 1987 before he was released during the All-Star break.

== Coaching and managerial career ==
Following his playing career, shortstop Rick Burleson was an Oakland Athletics Minor league infield instructor in 1989 and scout in 1990. He was an A's coach in 1991 and a member of the Boston Red Sox staff the next two seasons, (1992–1993). He was a California Angels Minor league Baserunning Instructor in 1994 and a coach for the California Angels (1995–1996).

Since the 1997 season, he has managed in the minors for the Lancaster JetHawks (1997-1998), San Bernardino Stampede (1999), where he won the California League championship, San Antonio Missions (2000), Billings Mustangs (2001-2003), where he won Pioneer League championships in 2001 and 2003, and Louisville Bats (2003-2004), before returning to Billings for two seasons (2005-2006). In 2007, he replaced Pat Kelly as manager of the GCL Reds, after Kelly was named bench coach by the Cincinnati Reds.

In 2008, Burleson switched to the Arizona Diamondbacks system and worked as a coach for the Visalia Oaks. From 2009 to 2012, Burleson served as hitting coach and first base coach for the Reno Aces of the Pacific Coast League, the triple-A affiliate of the Arizona Diamondbacks.

== Personal life ==
Burleson is the father of three sons.

== See also ==
- List of AL Silver Slugger Winners at Shortstop
- List of Boston Red Sox awards

Awards
Preceded by Jim Rice	Thomas A. Yawkey Memorial Most Valuable Player Award; 1979, 1980	Succeeded by Dwight Evans
Sporting positions
Preceded by Richie Hebner	Boston Red Sox Hitting Coach; 1992	Succeeded by Mike Easler
Preceded by Don Zimmer	Boston Red Sox Third-Base Coach; 1992–1993	Succeeded by Gary Allenson
