= 1982 Milwaukee Brewers season =

1982 Milwaukee Brewers
- American League champions American League East champions
- League: American League
- Division: East
- Ballpark: Milwaukee County Stadium
- City: Milwaukee, Wisconsin, United States
- Record: 95–67 (.586)
- Divisional place: 1st
- Owners: Bud Selig
- General managers: Harry Dalton
- Managers: Buck Rodgers and Harvey Kuenn
- Television: WVTV–TV 18 (Steve Shannon, Mike Hegan)
- Radio: WISN–AM 1130 (Bob Uecker, Dwayne Mosely, Kevin Young)

The 1982 Milwaukee Brewers season was the 13th season for the franchise. The team finished with the best record in MLB (95–67) and won their first American League pennant. They would eventually lose the World Series to the St. Louis Cardinals in seven games.

As a team, the Brewers led Major League Baseball in a number of offensive categories, including at bats (5733), runs scored (891), home runs (216), runs batted in (843), slugging percentage (.455), on-base plus slugging (.789), total bases (2606) and extra-base hits (534). This earned them the nickname "Harvey's Wallbangers", after their manager Harvey Kuenn.

This would be the last time that the Brewers qualified for the postseason as a member of the American League. The franchise would move to the National League in 1998, and would not qualify for the playoffs again until 2008, 10 years after they became an NL member. They also did not return to the World Series until 2026, as an NL member.

== Offseason ==
- October 23, 1981: Rickey Keeton was traded by the Brewers to the Houston Astros for Pete Ladd.
- January 12, 1982: Tom Pagnozzi was drafted by the Milwaukee Brewers in the 24th round of the 1982 amateur draft, but did not sign.
- February 26, 1982: John Flinn was released by the Brewers.

== Regular season ==
- August 27, 1982: Against the Brewers, Rickey Henderson broke Lou Brock's record for most stolen bases in one season. Doc Medich was on the mound when Henderson broke the record.
- September 24, 1982: Robin Yount had 6 RBIs in a game against the Baltimore Orioles.
- Paul Molitor's 136 runs not only led the American League, but they were the most scored in the league since 1949.
- Robin Yount became the first shortstop in American League history to lead the league in slugging percentage. He would go on to lead the league in hits, doubles, and total bases as he was voted the American League Most Valuable Player.

=== Season standings ===
The Brewers traveled to Baltimore needing to just win one game out of a four-game finale against the Orioles. The Brewers dropped the first three. They then won the last regular season game of the year in what was essentially a one-game playoff against the Orioles.

AL East
Team	W	L	Pct.	GB	Home	Road
Milwaukee Brewers	95	67	.586	—	48‍–‍34	47‍–‍33
Baltimore Orioles	94	68	.580	1	53‍–‍28	41‍–‍40
Boston Red Sox	89	73	.549	6	49‍–‍32	40‍–‍41
Detroit Tigers	83	79	.512	12	47‍–‍34	36‍–‍45
New York Yankees	79	83	.488	16	42‍–‍39	37‍–‍44
Cleveland Indians	78	84	.481	17	41‍–‍40	37‍–‍44
Toronto Blue Jays	78	84	.481	17	44‍–‍37	34‍–‍47

=== Record vs. opponents ===
1982 American League record Sources:
Team	BAL	BOS	CAL	CWS	CLE	DET	KC	MIL	MIN	NYY	OAK	SEA	TEX	TOR
Baltimore	—	4–9	7–5	5–7	6–7	7–6	4–8	9–4–1	8–4	11–2	7–5	7–5	9–3	10–3
Boston	9–4	—	7–5	4–8	6–7	8–5	6–6	4–9	6–6	7–6	8–4	7–5	10–2	7–6
California	5–7	5–7	—	8–5	8–4	5–7	7–6	6–6	7–6	7–5	9–4	10–3	8–5	8–4
Chicago	7–5	8–4	5–8	—	6–6	9–3	3–10	3–9	7–6	8–4	9–4	6–7	8–5	8–4
Cleveland	7–6	7–6	4–8	6–6	—	6–7	2–10	7–6	8–4	4–9	4–8	9–3	7–5	7–6
Detroit	6–7	5–8	7–5	3–9	7–6	—	6–6	3–10	9–3	8–5	9–3	6–6	8–4	6–7
Kansas City	8–4	6–6	6–7	10–3	10–2	6–6	—	7–5	7–6	5–7	7–6	7–6	7–6	4–8
Milwaukee	4–9–1	9–4	6–6	9–3	6–7	10–3	5–7	—	7–5	8–5	7–5	8–4	7–5	9–4
Minnesota	4–8	6–6	6–7	6–7	4–8	3–9	6–7	5–7	—	2–10	3–10	5–8	5–8	5–7
New York	2–11	6–7	5–7	4–8	9–4	5–8	7–5	5–8	10–2	—	7–5	6–6	7–5	6–7
Oakland	5–7	4–8	4–9	4–9	8–4	3–9	6–7	5–7	10–3	5–7	—	6–7	5–8	3–9
Seattle	5–7	5–7	3–10	7–6	3–9	6–6	6–7	4–8	8–5	6–6	7–6	—	9–4	7–5
Texas	3–9	2–10	5–8	5–8	5–7	4–8	6–7	5–7	8–5	5–7	8–5	4–9	—	4–8
Toronto	3–10	6–7	4–8	4–8	6–7	7–6	8–4	4–9	7–5	7–6	9–3	5–7	8–4	—

=== Notable transactions ===
- May 14, 1982: Rob Picciolo was traded by the Oakland Athletics to the Milwaukee Brewers for Mike Warren and John Evans (minors).
- June 7, 1982: Dale Sveum was drafted by the Milwaukee Brewers in the 1st round (25th pick) of the 1982 amateur draft. Player signed June 14, 1982.
- August 30, 1982: The Brewers traded players to be named later and cash to the Houston Astros for Don Sutton. The Brewers completed the trade by sending Kevin Bass, Frank DiPino, and Mike Madden to the Astros on September 3.

=== Roster ===
1982 Milwaukee Brewers
Roster
Pitchers: 46 Jerry Augustine; 47 Dwight Bernard; 48 Mike Caldwell; 28 Jamie Easterly; 34 Rollie Fingers; 30 Moose Haas; 45,54 Doug Jones; 27 Pete Ladd; 35 Randy Lerch; 10 Bob McClure; 33 Doc Medich; 43 Chuck Porter; 41 Jim Slaton; 21 Don Sutton; 50 Pete Vuckovich	Catchers: 23 Ted Simmons; 5 Ned Yost; Infielders: 15 Cecil Cooper; 17 Jim Gantner; 4 Paul Molitor; 8 Rob Picciolo; 11 Ed Romero; 19 Robin Yount	Outfielders: 26 Kevin Bass; 29 Mark Brouhard; 16 Marshall Edwards; 22 Charlie Moore; 24 Ben Oglivie; 26 Bob Skube; 20 Gorman Thomas; Other batters: 9 Larry Hisle; 13 Roy Howell; 7 Don Money	Manager: 32 Harvey Kuenn (6/2 – 10/20); 37 Buck Rodgers (4/9 – 6/1); Coaches: 45 Pat Dobson (Pitching); 12 Larry Haney (Bullpen); 18 Ron Hansen (First Base); 32 Harvey Kuenn (Hitting, 4/9 – 6/1); 38 Cal McLish (Pitching); 36 Harry Warner (Third Base)

== Game log ==
=== Regular season ===
Legend
	Brewers win
	Brewers loss
	Postponement
	Clinched division
**Bold**	Brewers team member

1982 regular season game log: 95–67–1 (Home: 48–34; Away: 47–33–1)
April: 9–8 (Home: 3–4; Away: 6–4)

#	Date	Time (CT)	Opponent	Score	Loss	Win	Save	Time of Game	Attendance	Record	Box/ Streak
–	April 6		Indians	**Postponed (Cold)** (Makeup date: September 2)							
–	April 8		Indians	**Postponed (Snow)** (Makeup date: September 2)							
1	April 9	2:40 p.m	@ Blue Jays	15–4	**Vuckovich** (1-0)	Bomback (0-1)	–		30,216	1-0	W1
2	April 10	12:37 p.m	@ Blue Jays	2–3 (10)	Jackson (1-0)	**Fingers** (0-1)	–		11,141	1-1	L1
3	April 11	12:38 p.m	@ Blue Jays	14–5	**McClure** (1-0)	Clancy (0-1)	–		10,128	2-1	W1
4	April 13	1:05 p.m	@ Indians	9–8 (10)	**Fingers** (1-1)	Lewallyn (0-1)	–		6,258	3-1	W2
5	April 14	1:07 p.m	@ Indians	2–6	Denny (1-0)	**Vuckovich** (1-1)	–		7,017	3-2	L1
6	April 15	4:05 p.m	@ Indians	1–8	Blyleven (1-0)	**Caldwell** (0-1)	–		7,017	3-3	L2
7	April 16		Rangers	1–4 (10)	Darwin (1-0)	**Fingers** (1-2)	–		49,887	3-4	L3
8	April 17		Rangers	3–5	Tanana (1-1)	**McClure** (1-1)	Comer (1)		10,107	3-5	L4
9	April 18		Rangers	6–9	Darwin (2-0)	**Vuckovich** (1-2)	–		25,264	3-6	L5
–	April 20		Rangers	**Postponed (Cold)** (Makeup date: August 12)							
10	April 21		Blue Jays	3–1	**Lerch** (1-0)	Leal (2-1)	**Fingers** (1)		5,298	4-6	W1
11	April 22		Blue Jays	7–0	**Caldwell** (1-1)	Bomback (0-3)	–		6,199	5-6	W2
12	April 23		@ Rangers	2–1	**Haas** (1-0)	Honeycutt (2-0)	**Fingers** (2)		13,818	6-6	W3
13	April 24		@ Rangers	4–1	**Vuckovich** (2-2)	Schmidt (0-1)	-		13,695	7-6	W4
14	April 25		@ Rangers	11–6	**Bernard** (1-0)	Matlack (0-1)	**Fingers** (3)		36,866	8-6	W5
15	April 27	7:30 p.m. CDT	White Sox	2–11	Hoyt (4–0)	**Lerch** (1–1)	—	2:26	9,500	8–7	L1
16	April 28	7:30 p.m. CDT	White Sox	2–1	**Fingers** (2–2)	Burns (2–1)	—	2:35	9,406	9–7	W1
17	April 30		@ Twins	4–7	Erickson (3-2)	**Haas** (1-1)	–		23,547	9-8	L1

May: 13–16 (Home: 7–8; Away: 6–8)

#	Date	Time (CT)	Opponent	Score	Loss	Win	Save	Time fo Game	Attendance	Record	Box/ Streak
18	May 1		@ Twins	6–5	**Vuckovich** (3-2)	Corbett (0-2)	**Fingers** (4)		25,587	10-8	W1
19	May 2		@ Twins	11–4	**Lerch** (2-1)	Williams (2-1)	**Bernard** (1)		24,605	11-8	W2
20	May 3	7:38 p.m. CDT	Royals	2–3	Splittorff (2–1)	**Caldwell** (1–2)	Quisenberry (8)	2:40	8,313	11–9	L1
21	May 4	7:37 p.m. CDT	Royals	9–5	**Slaton** (1–0)	Jackson (3–1)	—	2:43	7,646	12–9	W1
22	May 5	1:38 p.m. CDT	Royals	2–3 (10)	Quisenberry (2–1)	**Fingers** (2–3)	—	2:57	9,833	12–10	L1
23	May 6		Twins	6–3	**Vuckovich** (4-2)	Havens (1-1)	**Fingers** (5)		6,303	13-10	W1
24	May 7		Twins	4–1	**Lerch** (3-1)	Williams (2-2)	**Slaton** (1)		12,284	14-10	W2
25	May 8		Twins	12–1	**Caldwell** (2-2)	Felton (0-4)	–		18,081	15-10	W3
26	May 9		Twins	6–2	**Slaton** (2-0)	Redfern (2-4)	**Fingers** (6)		18,389	16-10	W4
27	May 10	7:35 p.m. CDT	@ Royals	2–3	Blue (2–2)	**Fingers** (2–4)	—	2:15	26,835	16–11	L1
28	May 11	7:35 p.m. CDT	@ Royals	3–17	Gura (3–1)	**Augustine** (0–1)	—	2:32	16,240	16–12	L2
29	May 12	7:35 p.m. CDT	@ Royals	7–9	Leonard (3–3)	**Lerch** (3–2)	Quisenberry (9)	2:48	17,788	16–13	L3
30	May 13	7:30 p.m. CDT	@ White Sox	2–13	Hoyt (7–0)	**Caldwell** (2–3)	—	2:46	23,043	16–14	L4
31	May 14	7:30 p.m. CDT	@ White Sox	2–1	**Slaton** (3–0)	Dotson (2–4)	**Fingers** (7)	2:59	35,038	17–14	W1
32	May 15	7:30 p.m. CDT	@ White Sox	8–3	**Bernard** (2–0)	Burns (4–2)	**Fingers** (8)	3:23	22,052	18–14	W2
33	May 16	1:15 p.m. CDT	@ White Sox	1–6	Trout (3–3)	**Lerch** (3–3)	Barojas (9)	3:03	21,339	18–15	L1
34	May 18	7:43 p.m. CDT	Angels	1–4	Renko (4–1)	**Caldwell** (2–4)	—	2:11	9,222	18–16	L2
35	May 19	7:36 p.m. CDT	Angels	2–7	Kison (3–0)	**Slaton** (3–1)	—	2:36	10,462	18–17	L3
36	May 20	1:35 p.m. CDT	Angels	4–1	**Haas** (2–1)	Zahn (5–2)	—	2:11	17,870	19–17	W1
37	May 21	9:06 p.m. CDT	Mariners	4–1	**McClure** (2–1)	Perry (3–4)	**Fingers** (9)	2:13	11,545	20–17	W2
38	May 22	1:42 p.m. CDT	Mariners	1–7	Nelson (2–6)	**Lerch** (3–4)	—	2:18	25,630	20–18	L1
39	May 23	1:35 p.m. CDT	Mariners	5–6 (11)	Caudill (5–2)	**Fingers** (2–5)	—	3:25	17,387	20–19	L2
40	May 25		Athletics	5–10	Keough (4-5)	**Haas** (2-2)	–		11,917	20-20	L3
41	May 26		Athletics	2–7	Underwood (2-3)	**McClure** (2-2)	–		7,503	20-21	L4
42	May 27	9:40 p.m. CDT	@ Angels	4–3	**Vuckovich** (5–2)	Forsch (4–4)	**Fingers** (10)	2:21	24,267	21–21	W1
43	May 28	9:41 p.m. CDT	@ Angels	5–6	Corbett (1–2)	**Bernard** (2–1)	—	2:21	36,824	21–22	L1
44	May 29	3:13 p.m. CDT	@ Angels	4–5 (10)	Sánchez (3–0)	**Easterly** (0–1)	—	3:01	26,620	21–23	L2
45	May 30	3:11 p.m. CDT	@ Angels	7–3	**Slaton** (4–1)	Kison (4–1)	**Easterly** (1)	2:41	30,270	22–23	W1
46	May 31	9:36 p.m. CDT	@ Mariners	4–5 (11)	Stanton (1–0)	**Augustine** (0–2)	—	3:07	8,424	22–24	L1

June: 20–7–1 (Home: 5–5; Away: 15–2–1)

#	Date	Time (CT)	Opponent	Score	Loss	Win	Save	Time of Game	Attendance	Record	Box/ Streak
47	June 1	9:36 p.m. CDT	@ Mariners	2–1	**Vuckovich** (6–2)	Nelson (3–7)	**Fingers** (11)	2:19	5,321	23–24	W1
48	June 2	9:36 p.m. CDT	@ Mariners	5–2	**Caldwell** (3–4)	Bannister (5–4)	—	2:30	8,937	24–24	W2
49	June 4		@ Athletics	10–1	**Haas** (3-2)	Keough (4-7)	**Slaton** (2)		17,890	25-24	W3
50	June 5		@ Athletics	11–3	**McClure** (3-2)	Beard (4-2)	–		36,142	26-24	W4
51	June 6		@ Athletics	7–2	**Vuckovich** (7-2)	Underwood (2-4)	–		24,698	27-24	W5
52	June 7	7:35 p.m. CDT	Orioles	2–7	Palmer (3-3)	**Caldwell** (3-5)	—	2:16	15,017	27-25	L1
53	June 8	7:35 p.m. CDT	Orioles	2–4	McGregor (7–4)	**Lerch** (3–5)	—	2:13	13,517	27–26	L2
54	June 9	7:35 p.m. CDT	Orioles	3–8	Flanagan (5–4)	**Haas** (3–3)	—	2:22	13,662	27–27	L3
55	June 10	1:35 p.m. CDT	Orioles	9–7	**Fingers** (3–5)	Martinez (1–4)	—	3:04	22,013	28–27	W1
56	June 11	7:39 p.m. CDT	Tigers	8–6	**Vuckovich** (8–2)	López (1–1)	**Fingers** (12)	2:36	22,165	29–27	W2
57	June 12	7:54 p.m. CDT	Tigers	3–7	Wilcox (5–2)	**Caldwell** (3–6)	—	2:38	22,165	29–28	L1
58	June 13	1:40 p.m. CDT	Tigers	13–5	**Lerch** (4–5)	Underwood (3–4)	**Slaton** (3)	2:44	48,424	30–28	W1
59	June 14	6:40 p.m. CDT	@ Orioles	4–9	McGregor (7–4)	**Haas** (3–4)	—	2:23	19,234	30–29	L1
60	June 15	6:37 p.m. CDT	@ Orioles	6–3	**McClure** (4–2)	Flanagan (5–5)	**Slaton** (4)	2:35	18,420	31–29	W1
61	June 16	6:39 p.m. CDT	@ Orioles	2–2	—	—	—	2:38	13,213	31–29–1	T1
62	June 17	5:37 p.m. CDT	@ Tigers	3–2 (11)	**Caldwell** (4–6)	Tobik (2–1)	**Fingers** (13)	2:42	26,321	32–29–1	W1
63	June 18	5:37 p.m. CDT	@ Tigers	5–2	**Lerch** (5–5)	Wilcox (5–3)	**Fingers** (14)	2:43	37,181	33–29–1	W2
64	June 19	5:34 p.m. CDT	@ Tigers	10–3	**Haas** (4–4)	Morris (8–7)	—	2:23	38,317	34–29–1	W3
65	June 20	11:35 a.m. CDT	@ Tigers	7–5	**Augustine** (1–2)	Ujdur (0–2)	**Fingers** (15)	2:34	31,696	35–29–1	W4
66	June 21		Yankees	6–2	**McClure** (5-2)	Righetti (5-5)	**Bernard** (2)		26,895	36-29-1	W5
67	June 22		Yankees	3–2	**Vuckovich** (9-2)	Erickson (4-6)	**Fingers** (16)		31,632	37-29-1	W6
68	June 23		Yankees	2–3	Morgan (4-4)	**Caldwell** (4-7)	Gossage (13)		31,822	37-30-1	L1
69	June 25	6:35 p.m. CDT	@ Red Sox	9–3	**Slaton** (5–1)	Hurst (2–2)	—	2:52	32,656	38–30–1	W1
70	June 26	12:54 p.m. CDT	@ Red Sox	11–10	**Fingers** (4–5)	Clear (6–3)	—	2:46	33,393	39–30–1	W2
71	June 27	12:09 p.m. CDT	@ Red Sox	7–5	**McClure** (6–2)	Torrez (4–4)	**Bernard** (3)	2:29	32,744	40–30–1	W3
72	June 28	6:37 p.m. CDT	@ Red Sox	7–9	Stanley (6–1)	**Vuckovich** (9–3)	—	2:31	25,773	40–31–1	L1
73	June 29		@ Yankees	11–4	**Caldwell** (5-7)	Guidry (8-3)	–		20,199	41-31-1	W1
74	June 30		@ Yankees	9–7 (12)	**Fingers** (5-5)	Rawley (4-4)	**Easterly** (2)		20,815	42-31-1	W2

July: 16–11 (Home: 11–5; Away: 5–6)

#	Date	Time (CT)	Opponent	Score	Loss	Win	Save	Time of Game	Attendance	Record	Box/ Streak
75	July 1		@ Yankees	3–5	Morgan (5-4)	**Haas** (4-5)	–		20,116	42-32-1	L1
76	July 2	7:39 p.m. CDT	Red Sox	14–5	**McClure** (7–2)	Torrez (4–5)	—	2:25	28,957	43–32–1	W1
77	July 3	7:39 p.m. CDT	Red Sox	7–0	**Vuckovich** (10–3)	Rainey (4–3)	—	2:42	55,716	44–32–1	W2
78	July 4	1:39 p.m. CDT	Red Sox	1–4	Eckersley (9–6)	**Caldwell** (5–8)	—	2:10	35,947	44–33–1	L1
79	July 5	7:30 p.m. CDT	@ White Sox	10–4	**Slaton** (6–1)	Hoyt (10–7)	—	3:16	18,530	45–33–1	W1
—	July 6	7:30 p.m. CDT	@ White Sox	**Postponed (Rain; Site change)** (Makeup date: July 15)							
80	July 7		Twins	8–11	Havens (4-6)	**McClure** (7-3)	Pacella (1)		22,654	45-34-1	L1
81	July 8		Twins	0–3	O'Connor (2-2)	**Vuckovich** (10-4)	Davis (7)		33,132	45-35-1	L2
82	July 9	7:35 p.m. CDT	Royals	9–6	**Caldwell** (6–8)	Splittorff (7–6)	**Fingers** (17)	2:59	26,983	46–35–1	W1
83	July 10	7:36 p.m. CDT	Royals	7–0	**Lerch** (6–5)	Blue (6–6)	—	3:04	33,641	47–35–1	W2
84	July 11	1:36 p.m. CDT	Royals	8–5	**Haas** (5–5)	Gura (10–5)	**Fingers** (18)	2:40	26,357	48–35–1	W3
ASG	July 13		AL @ NL	1–4	Steve Rogers (1-0)	Dennis Eckersley (0-1)	Tom Hume (1)		39,343	—	ASG
85 (1)	July 15	6:07 p.m. CDT	White Sox	8–4	**Slaton** (7–1)	Lamp (6–4)	—	2:59	—	49–35–1	W4
86 (2)	July 15	9:36 p.m. CDT	White Sox	5–4	**Caldwell** (7–8)	Hoyt (11–8)	**Fingers** (19)	2:14	33,657	50–35–1	W5
87	July 16	7:39 p.m. CDT	White Sox	5–3	**Haas** (6–5)	Koosman (2–4)	**Fingers** (20)	2:52	32,702	51–35–1	W6
88	July 17	7:40 p.m. CDT	White Sox	5–2	**Ladd** (1–0)	Barojas (5–3)	**Fingers** (21)	3:16	52,959	52–35–1	W7
89	July 18	1:43 p.m. CDT	White Sox	9–3	**Lerch** (7–5)	Barnes (0–1)	**Bernard** (4)	2:45	46,455	53–35–1	W8
90	July 19		@ Twins	4–6	Williams (3-6)	**Augustine** (1-3)	Pacella (2)		15,716	53-36-1	L1
91	July 20		@ Twins	3–5	O'Connor (3-3)	**Caldwell** (7-9)	Davis (9)		15,650	53-37-1	L2
92	July 21		@ Twins	10–4	**Haas** (7-5)	Viola (3-2)	—		18,634	54-37-1	W1
93	July 23	7:38 p.m. CDT	@ Royals	3–4	Quisenberry (5–4)	**Fingers** (5–6)	—	2:43	39,526	54–38–1	L1
94	July 24	7:38 p.m. CDT	@ Royals	7–4	**Vuckovich** (11–4)	Botelho (1–1)	—	2:38	40,232	55–38–1	W1
95	July 25	1:38 p.m. CDT	@ Royals	4–6	Gura (11–7)	**Lerch** (7–6)	Armstrong (3)	2:26	38,629	55–39–1	L1
96	July 26		@ Rangers	1–3	Hough (9-8)	**Caldwell** (7-10)	—		18,277	55-40-1	L2
97	July 27		@ Rangers	8–2	**Haas** (8-5)	Honeycutt (4-12)	—		12,821	56-40-1	W1
98	July 28		@ Rangers	3–2	**McClure** (8-3)	Tanana (5-11)	**Fingers** (22)		11,660	57-40-1	W2
99	July 29		Indians	1–5 (12)	Spillner (8-5)	**Slaton** (7-2)	–		29,781	57-41-1	L1
100	July 30		Indians	2–7	Sorensen (9-7)	**Lerch** (7-7)	–		27,103	57-42-1	L2
101	July 31		Indians	4–2	**Caldwell** (8-10)	Waits (1-10)	**Fingers** (23)		41,421	58-42-1	W1

August: 19–11 (Home: 10–6; Away: 9–5)

#	Date	Time (CT)	Opponent	Score	Loss	Win	Save	Time of Game	Attendance	Record	Box/ Streak
102	August 1 (1)		Indians	1–4	Whitson (2-1)	**Haas** (8-6)	Spillner (14)		–	58-43-1	L1
103	August 1 (2)		Indians	7–2	**Slaton** (8-2)	Anderson (0-2)	–		41,891	59-43-1	W1
104	August 2		@ Blue Jays	4–9	Stieb (11-10)	**McClure** (8-4)	–		20,141	59-44-1	L1
105	August 3		@ Blue Jays	7–4	**Vuckovich** (12-4)	Clancy (8-10)	**Fingers** (24)		16,575	60-44-1	W1
106	August 4	7:39 p.m	@ Blue Jays	8–0	**Caldwell** (9-10)	Gott (2-7)	–		17,521	61-44-1	W2
107	August 6	7:35 p.m	@ Indians	5–2 (10)	**Haas** (9-6)	Glynn (4-1)	**Fingers** (25)		18,243	62-44-1	W3
108	August 7	7:35 p.m	@ Indians	3–4 (11)	Glynn (4-1)	**Slaton** (8-3)	–		19,883	62-45-1	L1
109	August 8	2:05 p.m	@ Indians	7–6	**Haas** (9-6)	Glynn (4-1)	**Fingers** (26)		18,243	63-45-1	W1
110	August 9		Rangers	9–1	**Caldwell** (10-10)	Medich (7-11)	—		17,654	64-45-1	W2
111	August 10		Rangers	11–3	**Slaton** (9-3)	Hough (11-9)	—		23,262	65-45-1	W3
112	August 11		Rangers	3–6	Schmidt (3-4)	**Haas** (9-7)	—		36,016	65-46-1	L1
113	August 12 (1)	6:07 p.m	Blue Jays	7–1	**McClure** (9-4)	Gott (3-8)	–		–	66-46-1	W1
114	August 12 (2)	9:10 p.m	Blue Jays	4–3	**Lerch** (8-7)	Murray (7-4)	**Fingers** (27)		28,305	67-46-1	W2
115	August 13	7:42 p.m	Blue Jays	3–1	**Vuckovich** (13-4)	Leal (8-10)	–		49,064	68-46-1	W3
116	August 14	7:41 p.m	Blue Jays	2–4	Stieb (13-11)	**Caldwell** (10-11)	—		28,940	68-47-1	L1
117	August 15	1:43 p.m	Blue Jays	2–3	Clancy (10-10)	**Slaton** (9-4)	Murray (4)		26,180	68-48-1	L2
118	August 17	7:39 p.m	@ Athletics	6–10	Langford (9-13)	**Haas** (9-8)	—		12,692	68-49-1	L3
119	August 18	7:40 p.m	@ Athletics	2–3	Beard (7-8)	**McClure** (9-5)	—		16,841	68-50-1	L4
120	August 19	1:08 p.m	@ Athletics	10–6	**Vuckovich** (14-4)	Keough (10-16)	**Slaton** (5)		15,461	69-50-1	W1
121	August 20	9:37 p.m. CDT	@ Mariners	6–5	**Caldwell** (11–11)	Moore (6–10)	**Ladd** (1)	3:04	13,029	70–50–1	W2
122	August 21	9:38 p.m. CDT	@ Mariners	3–2	**Medich** (8–11)	Clark (3–1)	**Fingers** (28)	2:50	20,749	71–50–1	W3
123	August 22	9:07 p.m. CDT	@ Mariners	8–5	**Slaton** (10–4)	Bannister (11–9)	—	2:24	9,290	72–50–1	W4
124	August 23	9:33 p.m. CDT	@ Angels	3–5	Witt (8–4)	**McClure** (9–6)	—	2:13	35,197	72–51–1	L1
125	August 24	9:38 p.m. CDT	@ Angels	7–3	**Vuckovich** (15–4)	Renko (10–5)	—	2:41	41,921	73–51–1	W1
126	August 26	7:35 p.m	Athletics	10–3	**Caldwell** (12-11)	Kingman (3-10)	—		30,896	74-51-1	W2
127	August 27	7:30 p.m	Athletics	5–4	**Medich** (9-11)	Kingman (3-10)	—		41,600	75-51-1	W2
128	August 28	7:35 p.m	Athletics	6–7	Langford (10-14)	**Ladd** (1-1)	Owchinko (2)		43,099	75-52-1	L1
129	August 29	1:35 p.m	Athletics	8–1	**McClure** (10-6)	Norris (6-9)	—		34,563	76-52-1	W1
130	August 30	7:39 p.m. CDT	Mariners	2–3	Vande Berg (7–4)	**Slaton** (10–5)	—	3:06	13,008	76–53–1	L1
131	August 31	7:35 p.m. CDT	Mariners	8–2	**Caldwell** (13–11)	Clark (3–2)	—	2:55	8,631	77–53–1	W1

September: 17–11 (Home: 12–6; Away: 5–5)

#	Date	Time (CT)	Opponent	Score	Loss	Win	Save	Time of Game	Attendance	Record	Box/ Streak
132	September 1	7:35 p.m. CDT	Mariners	7–3	**Medich** (10–11)	Stanton (1–0)	—	2:35	10,782	78–55–1	W2
135	September 3	7:40 p.m. CDT	Angels	2–5	John (11–10)	**McClure** (10–7)	—	2:42	35,217	79–55–1	L2
136	September 4	7:40 p.m. CDT	Angels	8–2	**Vuckovich** (16–4)	Tiant (2–2)	—	2:55	30,931	80–55–1	W1
137	September 5	1:40 p.m. CDT	Angels	8–5	**Caldwell** (14–11)	Zahn (15–7)	**Ladd** (3)	2:43	36,258	81–55–1	W2
138	September 6	1:37 p.m. CDT	Tigers	5–6 (10)	Wilcox (10–7)	**Medich** (10–12)	López (1)	3:20	15,090	81–56–1	L1
139	September 7	7:38 p.m. CDT	Tigers	4–0	**Sutton** (1–1)	Petry (14–8)	—	2:25	11,709	82–56–1	W1
140	September 8	7:38 p.m. CDT	Tigers	9–7	**Haas** (11–8)	Ujdur (9–8)	—	2:58	13,043	83–56–1	W2
145	September 13	5:35 p.m. CDT	@ Tigers	3–4 (11)	López (3–1)	**Ladd** (1–3)	—	3:14	9,708	84–60–1	L3
146	September 14	5:35 p.m. CDT	@ Tigers	6–3	**Medich** (11–13)	Rucker (2–5)	**Slaton** (6)	3:27	8,516	85–60–1	W1
147	September 15	5:36 p.m. CDT	@ Tigers	5–3	**Vuckovich** (17–4)	Morris (16–15)	**Bernard** (5)	3:02	9,324	86–60–1	W2
151	September 20	7:39 p.m. CDT	Red Sox	4–3 (11)	**Vuckovich** (18–4)	Stanley (11–7)	—	2:48	13,641	90–60–1	W6
152	September 21	7:41 p.m. CDT	Red Sox	3–4 (10)	Clear (14–8)	**Medich** (11-14)	—	3:01	19,864	90–61–1	L1
153	September 22	7:43 p.m. CDT	Red Sox	3–1	**Caldwell** (17–11)	Denman (2–3)	—	2:09	24,150	91–61–1	W1
154	September 24	7:35 p.m. CDT	Orioles	15–6	**Sutton** (3–1)	Flanagan (15-11)	—	3:04	38,950	91–62–1	W2
155	September 25	7:35 p.m. CDT	Orioles	2–7	Palmer (15-4)	**Vuckovich** (18–5)	—	2:54	53,568	92–62–1	L1
156	September 26	1:05 p.m. CDT	Orioles	2–5	Martínez (15–12)	**Caldwell** (17–12)	Martinez (16)	3:04	48,161	92–63–1	L2
157	September 28	6:37 p.m. CDT	@ Red Sox	9–3	**Medich** (12–14)	Rainey (7–5)	**Haas** (1)	2:45	19,356	93–63–1	W1
158	September 29	6:36 p.m. CDT	@ Red Sox	6–3	**McClure** (12–7)	Clear (14–9)	—	3:07	18,390	94–63–1	W2
159	September 30	6:35 p.m. CDT	@ Red Sox	4–9	Eckersley (13–13)	**Slaton** (10–6)	Stanley (14)	3:01	21,268	94–64–1	L1

October: 1–3 (Home: 0–0; Away: 1–3)

#	Date	Time (CT)	Opponent	Score	Loss	Win	Save	Time of Game	Attendance	Record	Box/ Streak
160 (1)	October 1	4:39 p.m. CDT	@ Orioles	3–6	Martínez (16–12)	**Vuckovich** (18–6)	—	3:03	—	94–65–1	L2
161 (2)	October 1	8:19 p.m. CDT	@ Orioles	1–7	Davis (8–4)	**Caldwell** (17–13)	—	2:09	51,883	94–66–1	L3
162	October 2	1:24 p.m. CDT	@ Orioles	3–11	Stewart (10-9)	**Medich** (12-15)	—	3:02	47,235	94–67–1	L4
163	October 3	2:10 p.m. CDT	@ Orioles	10–2	**Sutton** (4–1)	Palmer (15-5)	—	3:11	51,642	95–67–1	W1

=== Detailed records ===
**American League**
Opponent	Home	Away	Total	Pct.	Runs scored	Runs allowed
**AL East**
Baltimore Orioles	2–5	2–4	4–9	.308	64	86
Boston Red Sox	4–2	5–2	9–4	.692	85	59
Detroit Tigers	4–2	6–1	10–3	.769	81	53
**Milwaukee Brewers**						
**Div Total**	**10–9**	**13–7**	**23–16**	**.590**	**230**	**198**
**AL West**
California Angels	3–3	3–3	6–6	.500	55	49
Chicago White Sox	6–1	3–2	9–3	.750	59	55
Kansas City Royals	4–2	1–5	5–7	.417	63	65
Seattle Mariners	3–3	5–1	8–4	.667	55	42
**Div Total**	**16–9**	**12–11**	**28–20**	**.583**	**232**	**211**
**Season Total**	**26–18**	**25–18**	**51–36**	**.586**	**462**	**409**

Month	Games	Won	Lost	Win %	RS	RA
April
May
June
July
August
September
October
Total

	Games	Won	Lost	Win %	RS	RA
Home						
Away						
Total						

=== Composite Box ===
1982 Milwaukee Brewers Inning–by–Inning Boxscore
Team	1	2	3	4	5	6	7	8	9	10	11	12	R	H	E
Opponents															
Brewers															

=== Postseason Game log ===
Legend
	Brewers win
	Brewers loss
**Bold**	Brewers team member

1982 Postseason game log: 6–6 (Home: 5–1; Away: 1–5)
AL Championship Series: vs. California Angels 3–2 (Home: 3–0; Away: 0–2)

#	Date	Time (CT)	Opponent	Score	Win	Loss	Save	Time of Game	Attendance	Series	Box/ Streak
1	October 5	7:25 p.m. CDT	@ Angels	3–8	John (1–0)	**Caldwell** (0–1)	—	2:31	64,406	CAL 1–0	L1
2	October 6	7:15 p.m. CDT	@ Angels	2–4	Kison (1–0)	**Vuckovich** (0–1)	—	2:06	64,179	CAL 2–0	L2
3	October 8	2:15 p.m. CDT	Angels	5–3	**Sutton** (1–0)	Zahn (0–1)	**Ladd** (1)	2:31	50,135	CAL 2–1	W1
4	October 9	12 Noon CDT	Angels	9–5	**Haas** (1–0)	John (1–1)	**Slaton** (1)	3:10	51,003	TIE 2–2	W2
5	October 10	3:20 p.m. CDT	Angels	4–3	**McClure** (1–0)	Sánchez (0–1)	**Ladd** (2)	3:01	54,968	MIL 3–2	W3

World Series: vs. St. Louis Cardinals 3–4 (Home: 2–1; Away: 1–3)

#	Date	Time (CT)	Opponent	Score	Win	Loss	Save	Time of Game	Attendance	Series	Box/ Streak
1	October 12	7:30 p.m. CDT	@ Cardinals	10–0	**Caldwell** (1–0)	Forsch (0–1)	—	2:30	53,723	MIL 1–0	W1
2	October 13	7:20 p.m. CDT	@ Cardinals	4–5	Sutter (1–0)	**McClure** (0–1)	—	2:54	53,723	TIE 1–1	L1
3	October 15	7:30 p.m. CDT	Cardinals	2–6	Andújar (1–0)	**Vuckovich** (0–1)	Sutter (1)	2:53	56,556	SLN 2–1	L2
4	October 16	12:20 p.m. CDT	Cardinals	7–5	**Slaton** (1–0)	Bair (0–1)	**McClure** (1)	3:04	56,560	TIE 2–2	W1
5	October 17	3:45 p.m. CDT	Cardinals	6–4	**Caldwell** (2–0)	Forsch (0–2)	**McClure** (2)	3:02	56,562	MIL 3–2	W2
6	October 19	7:20 p.m. CDT	@ Cardinals	1–13	Stuper (1–0)	**Sutton** (0–1)	—	2:21	53,723	TIE 3–3	L1
7	October 20	7:20 p.m. CDT	@ Cardinals	3–6	Andújar (2–0)	**McClure** (0–2)	Sutter (2)	2:50	53,723	SLN 4–3	L2

== Starting Lineups ==
=== Regular Season ===
==== Batting Order ====
1982 Regular Season Batting Order game log
April

#	Date	Opponent	1st	2nd	3rd	4th	5th	6th	7th	8th	9th
15	April 27	CWS	#4; Molitor (3B)	#19; Yount (SS)	#15; Cooper (1B)	#24; Oglivie (LF)	#23; Simmons (C)	#20; Thomas (CF)	#13; Howell (DH)	#22; Moore (RF)	#17; Gantner (2B)
16	April 28	CWS	#4; Molitor (3B)	#19; Yount (SS)	#15; Cooper (1B)	#24; Oglivie (LF)	#23; Simmons (C)	#20; Thomas (CF)	#7; Money (DH)	#29; Brouhard (RF)	#17; Gantner (2B)

May

#	Date	Opponent	1st	2nd	3rd	4th	5th	6th	7th	8th	9th
20	May 3	KC	#4; Molitor (3B)	#19; Yount (SS)	#15; Cooper (1B)	#24; Oglivie (LF)	#23; Simmons (C)	#20; Thomas (CF)	#7; Money (DH)	#22; Moore (RF)	#17; Gantner (2B)
21	May 4	KC	#4; Molitor (3B)	#19; Yount (SS)	#15; Cooper (1B)	#24; Oglivie (LF)	#23; Simmons (C)	#20; Thomas (CF)	#9; Hisle (DH)	#22; Moore (RF)	#17; Gantner (2B)
22	May 5	KC	#22; Moore (RF)	#19; Yount (SS)	#15; Cooper (1B)	#20; Thomas (CF)	#7; Money (3B)	#9; Hisle (DH)	#29; Brouhard (LF)	#17; Gantner (2B)	#5; Yost (C)
27	May 10	@ KC	#4; Molitor (DH)	#19; Yount (SS)	#15; Cooper (1B)	#24; Oglivie (LF)	#23; Simmons (C)	#20; Thomas (CF)	#7; Money (3B)	#17; Gantner (2B)	#29; Brouhard (RF)
28	May 11	@ KC	#4; Molitor (3B)	#19; Yount (SS)	#15; Cooper (DH)	#20; Thomas (CF)	#23; Simmons (C)	#24; Oglivie (LF)	#7; Money (1B)	#11; Romero (2B)	#22; Moore (RF)
29	May 12	@ KC	#4; Molitor (3B)	#19; Yount (SS)	#15; Cooper (1B)	#24; Oglivie (LF)	#23; Simmons (DH)	#20; Thomas (CF)	#17; Gantner (2B)	#22; Moore (C)	#16; Edwards (RF)
30	May 13	@ CWS	#4; Molitor (3B)	#19; Yount (SS)	#15; Cooper (1B)	#24; Oglivie (LF)	#23; Simmons (DH)	#20; Thomas (CF)	#17; Gantner (2B)	#22; Moore (C)	#16; Edwards (RF)
31	May 14	@ CWS	#4; Molitor (3B)	#19; Yount (SS)	#15; Cooper (1B)	#24; Oglivie (LF)	#23; Simmons (DH)	#20; Thomas (CF)	#17; Gantner (2B)	#16; Edwards (RF)	#5; Yost (C)
32	May 15	@ CWS	#4; Molitor (DH)	#19; Yount (SS)	#15; Cooper (1B)	#20; Thomas (CF)	#7; Money (3B)	#24; Oglivie (LF)	#22; Moore (RF)	#17; Gantner (2B)	#5; Yost (C)
33	May 16	@ CWS	#4; Molitor (3B)	#19; Yount (SS)	#7; Money (1B)	#20; Thomas (CF)	#23; Simmons (DH)	#24; Oglivie (LF)	#22; Moore (RF)	#17; Gantner (2B)	#5; Yost (C)
34	May 18	CAL	#4; Molitor (3B)	#19; Yount (SS)	#15; Cooper (1B)	#24; Oglivie (LF)	#23; Simmons (DH)	#20; Thomas (CF)	#17; Gantner (2B)	#16; Edwards (RF)	#5; Yost (C)
35	May 19	CAL	#17; Gantner (2B)	#19; Yount (SS)	#15; Cooper (1B)	#7; Money (3B)	#24; Oglivie (LF)	#20; Thomas (CF)	#23; Simmons (DH)	#16; Edwards (RF)	#5; Yost (C)
36	May 20	CAL	#4; Molitor (DH)	#22; Moore (C)	#15; Cooper (1B)	#7; Money (3B)	#20; Thomas (CF)	#24; Oglivie (LF)	#19; Yount (SS)	#29; Brouhard (RF)	#17; Gantner (2B)
37	May 21	SEA	#4; Molitor (DH)								
38	May 22	SEA							#23; Simmons (DH)		
39	May 23	SEA	#4; Molitor (DH)								
42	May 27	@ CAL	#4; Molitor (3B)	#13; Howell (DH)	#15; Cooper (1B)	#20; Thomas (CF)	#24; Oglivie (LF)	#23; Simmons (C)	#19; Yount (SS)	#17; Gantner (2B)	#22; Moore (RF)
43	May 28	@ CAL	#4; Molitor (3B)	#19; Yount (SS)	#15; Cooper (1B)	#7; Money (DH)	#20; Thomas (CF)	#24; Oglivie (LF)	#23; Simmons (C)	#29; Brouhard (RF)	#8; Picciolo (2B)
44	May 29	@ CAL	#16; Edwards (CF)	#4; Molitor (3B)	#15; Cooper (1B)	#19; Yount (SS)	#24; Oglivie (LF)	#13; Howell (DH)	#29; Brouhard (RF)	#17; Gantner (2B)	#5; Yost (C)
45	May 30	@ CAL	#4; Molitor (3B)	#13; Howell (DH)	#15; Cooper (1B)	#19; Yount (SS)	#23; Simmons (C)	#24; Oglivie (LF)	#29; Brouhard (RF)	#17; Gantner (2B)	#16; Edwards (CF)
46	May 31	@ SEA						#13; Howell (DH)			

June

#	Date	Opponent	1st	2nd	3rd	4th	5th	6th	7th	8th	9th
47	June 1	@ SEA						#13; Howell (DH)			
48	June 2	@ SEA				#7; Money (DH)					
52	June 7	BAL	#4; Molitor (3B)	#19; Yount (SS)	#15; Cooper (1B)	#24; Oglivie (LF)	#23; Simmons (C)	#20; Thomas (CF)	#13; Howell (DH)	#22; Moore (C)	#17; Gantner (2B)
53	June 8	BAL	#4; Molitor (3B)	#19; Yount (SS)	#15; Cooper (1B)	#20; Thomas (CF)	#23; Simmons (C)	#24; Oglivie (LF)	#7; Money (DH)	#22; Moore (C)	#17; Gantner (2B)
54	June 9	BAL	#4; Molitor (3B)	#22; Moore (C)	#15; Cooper (1B)	#20; Thomas (CF)	#23; Simmons (C)	#24; Oglivie (LF)	#7; Money (DH)	#8; Picciolo (SS)	#11; Romero (2B)
55	June 10	BAL	#4; Molitor (3B)	#19; Yount (SS)	#7; Money (1B)	#24; Oglivie (LF)	#20; Thomas (CF)	#13; Howell (DH)	#22; Moore (C)	#16; Edwards (RF)	#17; Gantner (2B)
56	June 11	DET									#16; Edwards (DH)
57	June 12	DET									#16; Edwards (DH)
58	June 13	DET						#29; Brouhard (DH)			
59	June 14	@ BAL	#4; Molitor (3B)	#19; Yount (SS)	#7; Money (1B)	#20; Thomas (CF)	#24; Oglivie (LF)	#23; Simmons (DH)	#16; Edwards (RF)	#17; Gantner (2B)	#5; Yost (C)
60	June 15	@ BAL	#4; Molitor (3B)	#19; Yount (SS)	#15; Cooper (1B)	#20; Thomas (CF)	#24; Oglivie (LF)	#17; Gantner (2B)	#7; Money (DH)	#22; Moore (C)	#16; Edwards (RF)
61	June 16	@ BAL	#4; Molitor (3B)	#19; Yount (SS)	#15; Cooper (1B)	#23; Simmons (C)	#24; Oglivie (LF)	#20; Thomas (CF)	#13; Howell (DH)	#17; Gantner (2B)	#16; Edwards (RF)
62	June 17	@ DET							#13; Howell (DH)		
63	June 18	@ DET							#13; Howell (DH)		
64	June 19	@ DET							#13; Howell (DH)		
65	June 20	@ DET							#13; Howell (DH)		
69	June 25	@ BOS	#4; Molitor (3B)	#19; Yount (SS)	#15; Cooper (1B)	#23; Simmons (C)	#20; Thomas (CF)	#24; Oglivie (LF)	#7; Money (DH)	#11; Romero (2B)	#22; Moore (RF)
70	June 26	@ BOS	#4; Molitor (3B)	#19; Yount (SS)	#15; Cooper (1B)	#23; Simmons (C)	#20; Thomas (CF)	#24; Oglivie (LF)	#7; Money (DH)	#11; Romero (2B)	#22; Moore (RF)
71	June 27	@ BOS	#4; Molitor (3B)	#19; Yount (SS)	#15; Cooper (1B)	#23; Simmons (C)	#24; Oglivie (LF)	#20; Thomas (CF)	#13; Howell (DH)	#11; Romero (2B)	#22; Moore (RF)
72	June 28	@ BOS	#4; Molitor (3B)	#19; Yount (SS)	#15; Cooper (1B)	#23; Simmons (C)	#24; Oglivie (LF)	#20; Thomas (CF)	#13; Howell (DH)	#11; Romero (2B)	#22; Moore (RF)

July

#	Date	Opponent	1st	2nd	3rd	4th	5th	6th	7th	8th	9th
76	July 2	BOS	#4; Molitor (3B)	#19; Yount (SS)	#15; Cooper (1B)	#23; Simmons (C)	#24; Oglivie (LF)	#20; Thomas (CF)	#13; Howell (DH)	#11; Romero (2B)	#16; Edwards (RF)
77	July 3	BOS	#4; Molitor (3B)	#19; Yount (SS)	#15; Cooper (1B)	#23; Simmons (C)	#24; Oglivie (LF)	#20; Thomas (CF)	#13; Howell (DH)	#11; Romero (2B)	#16; Edwards (RF)
78	July 4	BOS	#4; Molitor (3B)	#19; Yount (SS)	#15; Cooper (1B)	#23; Simmons (C)	#24; Oglivie (LF)	#20; Thomas (CF)	#13; Howell (DH)	#11; Romero (2B)	#16; Edwards (RF)
79	July 5	@ CWS	#4; Molitor (3B)	#19; Yount (SS)	#15; Cooper (1B)	#23; Simmons (C)	#24; Oglivie (LF)	#20; Thomas (CF)	#13; Howell (DH)	#11; Romero (2B)	#16; Edwards (RF)
82	July 9	KC	#4; Molitor (3B)	#19; Yount (SS)	#15; Cooper (1B)	#23; Simmons (C)	#20; Thomas (CF)	#24; Oglivie (LF)	#7; Money (DH)	#11; Romero (2B)	#22; Moore (RF)
83	July 10	KC	#4; Molitor (3B)	#19; Yount (SS)	#15; Cooper (1B)	#23; Simmons (C)	#20; Thomas (CF)	#24; Oglivie (LF)	#7; Money (DH)	#11; Romero (2B)	#22; Moore (RF)
84	July 11	KC	#4; Molitor (3B)	#19; Yount (SS)	#15; Cooper (1B)	#23; Simmons (C)	#20; Thomas (CF)	#24; Oglivie (LF)	#7; Money (DH)	#11; Romero (2B)	#22; Moore (RF)
85	July 15	CWS	#4; Molitor (3B)	#19; Yount (SS)	#15; Cooper (1B)	#23; Simmons (C)	#24; Oglivie (LF)	#20; Thomas (CF)	#13; Howell (DH)	#16; Edwards (RF)	#17; Gantner (2B)
86	July 15	CWS	#4; Molitor (3B)	#19; Yount (SS)	#15; Cooper (1B)	#24; Oglivie (LF)	#20; Thomas (CF)	#22; Moore (RF)	#13; Howell (DH)	#11; Romero (2B)	#5; Yost (C)
87	July 16	CWS	#4; Molitor (3B)	#19; Yount (SS)	#15; Cooper (1B)	#23; Simmons (C)	#20; Thomas (CF)	#24; Oglivie (LF)	#7; Money (DH)	#22; Moore (RF)	#17; Gantner (2B)
88	July 17	CWS	#4; Molitor (3B)	#19; Yount (SS)	#15; Cooper (1B)	#23; Simmons (C)	#20; Thomas (CF)	#24; Oglivie (LF)	#7; Money (DH)	#22; Moore (RF)	#17; Gantner (2B)
89	July 18	CWS	#4; Molitor (3B)	#19; Yount (SS)	#15; Cooper (1B)	#23; Simmons (C)	#20; Thomas (CF)	#24; Oglivie (LF)	#7; Money (DH)	#22; Moore (RF)	#17; Gantner (2B)
93	July 23	@ KC	#4; Molitor (3B)	#19; Yount (SS)	#15; Cooper (1B)	#23; Simmons (C)	#20; Thomas (CF)	#24; Oglivie (LF)	#7; Money (DH)	#22; Moore (RF)	#17; Gantner (2B)
94	July 24	@ KC	#4; Molitor (3B)	#19; Yount (SS)	#15; Cooper (1B)	#23; Simmons (C)	#24; Oglivie (LF)	#20; Thomas (CF)	#13; Howell (DH)	#22; Moore (RF)	#17; Gantner (2B)
95	July 25	@ KC	#4; Molitor (3B)	#19; Yount (SS)	#15; Cooper (1B)	#23; Simmons (C)	#20; Thomas (CF)	#24; Oglivie (LF)	#7; Money (DH)	#22; Moore (RF)	#17; Gantner (2B)

August

#	Date	Opponent	1st	2nd	3rd	4th	5th	6th	7th	8th	9th
121	August 20	@ SEA							#13; Howell (DH)		
122	August 21	@ SEA							#13; Howell (DH)		
123	August 22	@ SEA					#7; Money (DH)				
124	August 23	@ CAL	#4; Molitor (3B)	#19; Yount (SS)	#15; Cooper (1B)	#23; Simmons (C)	#24; Oglivie (LF)	#20; Thomas (CF)	#13; Howell (DH)	#16; Edwards (RF)	#17; Gantner (2B)
125	August 24	@ CAL	#4; Molitor (3B)	#19; Yount (SS)	#15; Cooper (1B)	#23; Simmons (C)	#24; Oglivie (LF)	#20; Thomas (CF)	#13; Howell (DH)	#22; Moore (RF)	#17; Gantner (2B)
130	August 30	SEA							#13; Howell (DH)		
131	August 31	SEA							#7; Money (DH)		

September

#	Date	Opponent	1st	2nd	3rd	4th	5th	6th	7th	8th	9th
132	September 1	SEA							#13; Howell (DH)		
135	September 3	CAL	#4; Molitor (3B)	#19; Yount (SS)	#15; Cooper (1B)	#23; Simmons (C)	#20; Thomas (CF)	#7; Money (DH)	#29; Brouhard (LF)	#22; Moore (RF)	#17; Gantner (2B)
136	September 4	CAL	#4; Molitor (3B)	#19; Yount (SS)	#15; Cooper (1B)	#23; Simmons (C)	#20; Thomas (CF)	#13; Howell (DH)	#22; Moore (RF)	#16; Edwards (LF)	#17; Gantner (2B)
137	September 5	CAL	#4; Molitor (3B)	#19; Yount (SS)	#15; Cooper (1B)	#20; Thomas (CF)	#7; Money (DH)	#29; Brouhard (LF)	#22; Moore (RF)	#5; Yost (C)	#17; Gantner (2B)
138	September 6	DET						#13; Howell (DH)			
139	September 7	DET							#13; Howell (DH)		
140	September 8	DET							#13; Howell (DH)		
145	September 13	@ DET							#13; Howell (DH)		
146	September 14	@ DET							#7; Money (DH)		
147	September 15	@ DET							#13; Howell (DH)		
151	September 20	BOS	#4; Molitor (3B)	#19; Yount (SS)	#15; Cooper (1B)	#23; Simmons (C)	#24; Oglivie (LF)	#20; Thomas (CF)	#13; Howell (DH)	#22; Moore (RF)	#17; Gantner (2B)
152	September 21	BOS	#4; Molitor (3B)	#19; Yount (SS)	#15; Cooper (1B)	#23; Simmons (C)	#24; Oglivie (LF)	#20; Thomas (CF)	#13; Howell (DH)	#22; Moore (RF)	#17; Gantner (2B)
153	September 22	BOS	#4; Molitor (3B)	#19; Yount (SS)	#15; Cooper (1B)	#23; Simmons (C)	#24; Oglivie (LF)	#20; Thomas (CF)	#13; Howell (DH)	#22; Moore (RF)	#17; Gantner (2B)
154	September 24	BAL	#4; Molitor (3B)	#19; Yount (SS)	#15; Cooper (1B)	#23; Simmons (C)	#20; Thomas (CF)	#24; Oglivie (LF)	#7; Money (DH)	#22; Moore (RF)	#17; Gantner (2B)
155	September 25	BAL	#4; Molitor (3B)	#19; Yount (SS)	#15; Cooper (1B)	#23; Simmons (C)	#24; Oglivie (LF)	#20; Thomas (CF)	#13; Howell (DH)	#22; Moore (RF)	#17; Gantner (2B)
156	September 26	BAL	#4; Molitor (3B)	#19; Yount (SS)	#15; Cooper (1B)	#23; Simmons (C)	#24; Oglivie (LF)	#20; Thomas (CF)	#13; Howell (DH)	#22; Moore (RF)	#17; Gantner (2B)
157	September 28	@ BOS	#4; Molitor (3B)	#19; Yount (SS)	#15; Cooper (1B)	#23; Simmons (C)	#24; Oglivie (LF)	#20; Thomas (CF)	#13; Howell (DH)	#22; Moore (RF)	#17; Gantner (2B)
158	September 29	@ BOS	#4; Molitor (3B)	#19; Yount (SS)	#15; Cooper (1B)	#23; Simmons (C)	#20; Thomas (CF)	#24; Oglivie (LF)	#7; Money (DH)	#22; Moore (RF)	#17; Gantner (2B)
159	September 30	@ BOS	#4; Molitor (3B)	#19; Yount (SS)	#15; Cooper (1B)	#23; Simmons (C)	#24; Oglivie (LF)	#20; Thomas (CF)	#13; Howell (DH)	#22; Moore (RF)	#17; Gantner (2B)

October

#	Date	Opponent	1st	2nd	3rd	4th	5th	6th	7th	8th	9th
160	October 1	@ BAL	#4; Molitor (3B)	#19; Yount (SS)	#15; Cooper (1B)	#23; Simmons (C)	#24; Oglivie (LF)	#20; Thomas (CF)	#13; Howell (DH)	#22; Moore (RF)	#17; Gantner (2B)
161	October 1	@ BAL	#4; Molitor (3B)	#19; Yount (SS)	#15; Cooper (1B)	#20; Thomas (CF)	#24; Oglivie (LF)	#22; Moore (RF)	#13; Howell (DH)	#5; Yost (C)	#17; Gantner (2B)
162	October 2	@ BAL	#4; Molitor (3B)	#19; Yount (SS)	#15; Cooper (1B)	#23; Simmons (C)	#20; Thomas (CF)	#24; Oglivie (LF)	#7; Money (DH)	#22; Moore (RF)	#17; Gantner (2B)
163	October 3	@ BAL	#4; Molitor (3B)	#19; Yount (SS)	#15; Cooper (1B)	#23; Simmons (C)	#24; Oglivie (LF)	#20; Thomas (CF)	#13; Howell (DH)	#22; Moore (RF)	#11; Romero (2B)

==== Defensive Lineup ====
1982 Regular Season Defensive Lineup game log
April

#	Date	Opponent	C	1B	2B	3B	SS	LF	CF	RF	P	DH
15	April 27	CWS	#23; Simmons	#15; Cooper	#17; Gantner	#4; Molitor	#19; Yount	#24; Oglivie	#20; Thomas	#22; Moore	#35; Lerch	#13; Howell
16	April 28	CWS	#23; Simmons	#15; Cooper	#17; Gantner	#4; Molitor	#19; Yount	#24; Oglivie	#20; Thomas	#29; Brouhard	#48; Caldwell	#7; Money

May

#	Date	Opponent	C	1B	2B	3B	SS	LF	CF	RF	P	DH
20	May 3	KC	#23; Simmons	#15; Cooper	#17; Gantner	#4; Molitor	#19; Yount	#24; Oglivie	#20; Thomas	#22; Moore	#48; Caldwell	#7; Money
21	May 4	KC	#23; Simmons	#15; Cooper	#17; Gantner	#4; Molitor	#19; Yount	#24; Oglivie	#20; Thomas	#22; Moore	#10; McClure	#9; Hisle
22	May 5	KC	#5; Yost	#15; Cooper	#17; Gantner	#7; Money	#19; Yount	#29; Brouhard	#20; Thomas	#22; Moore	#30; Haas	#9; Hisle
27	May 10	@ KC	#23; Simmons	#15; Cooper	#17; Gantner	#7; Money	#19; Yount	#24; Oglivie	#20; Thomas	#29; Brouhard	#30; Haas	#4; Molitor
28	May 11	@ KC	#23; Simmons	#7; Money	#11; Romero	#4; Molitor	#19; Yount	#24; Oglivie	#20; Thomas	#22; Moore	#46; Augustine	#15; Cooper
29	May 12	@ KC	#22; Moore	#15; Cooper	#17; Gantner	#4; Molitor	#19; Yount	#24; Oglivie	#20; Thomas	#16; Edwards	#35; Lerch	#23; Simmons
30	May 13	@ CWS	#22; Moore	#15; Cooper	#17; Gantner	#4; Molitor	#19; Yount	#24; Oglivie	#20; Thomas	#16; Edwards	#48; Caldwell	#23; Simmons
31	May 14	@ CWS	#5; Yost	#15; Cooper	#17; Gantner	#4; Molitor	#19; Yount	#24; Oglivie	#20; Thomas	#16; Edwards	#41; Slaton	#23; Simmons
32	May 15	@ CWS	#5; Yost	#15; Cooper	#17; Gantner	#7; Money	#19; Yount	#24; Oglivie	#20; Thomas	#22; Moore	#30; Haas	#4; Molitor
33	May 16	@ CWS	#5; Yost	#7; Money	#17; Gantner	#4; Molitor	#19; Yount	#24; Oglivie	#20; Thomas	#22; Moore	#35; Lerch	#23; Simmons
34	May 18	CAL	#5; Yost	#15; Cooper	#17; Gantner	#4; Molitor	#19; Yount	#24; Oglivie	#20; Thomas	#16; Edwards	#48; Caldwell	#23; Simmons
35	May 19	CAL	#5; Yost	#15; Cooper	#17; Gantner	#7; Money	#19; Yount	#24; Oglivie	#20; Thomas	#16; Edwards	#41; Slaton	#23; Simmons
36	May 20	CAL	#22; Moore	#15; Cooper	#17; Gantner	#7; Money	#19; Yount	#24; Oglivie	#20; Thomas	#29; Brouhard	#30; Haas	#4; Molitor
37	May 21	SEA									#10; McClure	#4; Molitor
38	May 22	SEA									#35; Lerch	#23; Simmons
39	May 23	SEA									#48; Caldwell	#4; Molitor
42	May 27	@ CAL	#23; Simmons	#15; Cooper	#17; Gantner	#4; Molitor	#19; Yount	#24; Oglivie	#20; Thomas	#22; Moore	#50; Vuckovich	#13; Howell
43	May 28	@ CAL	#23; Simmons	#15; Cooper	#8; Picciolo	#4; Molitor	#19; Yount	#24; Oglivie	#20; Thomas	#29; Brouhard	#48; Caldwell	#7; Money
44	May 29	@ CAL	#5; Yost	#15; Cooper	#17; Gantner	#4; Molitor	#19; Yount	#24; Oglivie	#16; Edwards	#29; Brouhard	#35; Lerch	#13; Howell
45	May 30	@ CAL	#23; Simmons	#15; Cooper	#17; Gantner	#4; Molitor	#19; Yount	#24; Oglivie	#16; Edwards	#29; Brouhard	#41; Slaton	#13; Howell
46	May 31	@ SEA									#10; McClure	#13; Howell

June

#	Date	Opponent	C	1B	2B	3B	SS	LF	CF	RF	P	DH
47	June 1	@ SEA									#50; Vuckovich	#13; Howell
48	June 2	@ SEA									#48; Caldwell	#7; Money
52	June 7	BAL	#23; Simmons	#15; Cooper	#17; Gantner	#4; Molitor	#19; Yount	#24; Oglivie	#20; Thomas	#22; Moore	#48; Caldwell	#13; Howell
53	June 8	BAL	#23; Simmons	#15; Cooper	#17; Gantner	#4; Molitor	#19; Yount	#24; Oglivie	#20; Thomas	#22; Moore	#35; Lerch	#7; Money
54	June 9	BAL	#23; Simmons	#15; Cooper	#11; Romero	#4; Molitor	#8; Picciolo	#24; Oglivie	#20; Thomas	#22; Moore	#30; Haas	#7; Money
55	June 10	BAL	#22; Moore	#7; Money	#17; Gantner	#4; Molitor	#19; Yount	#24; Oglivie	#20; Thomas	#16; Edwards	#10; McClure	#13; Howell
56	June 11	DET									#50; Vuckovich	#16; Edwards
57	June 12	DET									#48; Caldwell	#16; Edwards
58	June 13	DET									#35; Lerch	#29; Brouhard
59	June 14	@ BAL	#5; Yost	#7; Money	#17; Gantner	#4; Molitor	#19; Yount	#24; Oglivie	#20; Thomas	#22; Moore	#30; Haas	#23; Simmons
60	June 15	@ BAL	#22; Moore	#15; Cooper	#17; Gantner	#4; Molitor	#19; Yount	#24; Oglivie	#20; Thomas	#16; Edwards	#10; McClure	#7; Money
61	June 16	@ BAL	#23; Simmons	#15; Cooper	#17; Gantner	#4; Molitor	#19; Yount	#24; Oglivie	#20; Thomas	#22; Moore	#50; Vuckovich	#13; Howell
62	June 17	@ DET									#48; Caldwell	#13; Howell
63	June 18	@ DET									#35; Lerch	#13; Howell
64	June 19	@ DET									#30; Haas	#13; Howell
65	June 20	@ DET									#41; Slaton	#13; Howell
69	June 25	@ BOS	#23; Simmons	#15; Cooper	#11; Romero	#4; Molitor	#19; Yount	#24; Oglivie	#20; Thomas	#22; Moore	#35; Lerch	#7; Money
70	June 26	@ BOS	#23; Simmons	#15; Cooper	#11; Romero	#4; Molitor	#19; Yount	#24; Oglivie	#20; Thomas	#22; Moore	#30; Haas	#7; Money
71	June 27	@ BOS	#23; Simmons	#15; Cooper	#11; Romero	#4; Molitor	#19; Yount	#24; Oglivie	#20; Thomas	#22; Moore	#10; McClure	#13; Howell
72	June 28	@ BOS	#23; Simmons	#15; Cooper	#11; Romero	#4; Molitor	#19; Yount	#24; Oglivie	#20; Thomas	#22; Moore	#50; Vuckovich	#13; Howell

July

#	Date	Opponent	C	1B	2B	3B	SS	LF	CF	RF	P	DH
76	July 2	BOS	#23; Simmons	#15; Cooper	#11; Romero	#4; Molitor	#19; Yount	#24; Oglivie	#20; Thomas	#16; Edwards	#10; McClure	#13; Howell
77	July 3	BOS	#23; Simmons	#15; Cooper	#11; Romero	#4; Molitor	#19; Yount	#24; Oglivie	#20; Thomas	#16; Edwards	#50; Vuckovich	#13; Howell
78	July 4	BOS	#23; Simmons	#15; Cooper	#11; Romero	#4; Molitor	#19; Yount	#24; Oglivie	#20; Thomas	#16; Edwards	#48; Caldwell	#13; Howell
79	July 5	@ CWS	#23; Simmons	#15; Cooper	#11; Romero	#4; Molitor	#19; Yount	#24; Oglivie	#20; Thomas	#16; Edwards	#35; Lerch	#13; Howell
82	July 9	KC	#23; Simmons	#15; Cooper	#11; Romero	#4; Molitor	#19; Yount	#24; Oglivie	#20; Thomas	#22; Moore	#48; Caldwell	#7; Money
83	July 10	KC	#23; Simmons	#15; Cooper	#11; Romero	#4; Molitor	#19; Yount	#24; Oglivie	#20; Thomas	#22; Moore	#35; Lerch	#7; Money
84	July 11	KC	#23; Simmons	#15; Cooper	#11; Romero	#4; Molitor	#19; Yount	#24; Oglivie	#20; Thomas	#22; Moore	#30; Haas	#7; Money
85	July 15	CWS	#23; Simmons	#15; Cooper	#17; Gantner	#4; Molitor	#19; Yount	#24; Oglivie	#20; Thomas	#16; Edwards	#50; Vuckovich	#13; Howell
86	July 15	CWS	#5; Yost	#15; Cooper	#11; Romero	#4; Molitor	#19; Yount	#24; Oglivie	#20; Thomas	#22; Moore	#48; Caldwell	#13; Howell
87	July 16	CWS	#23; Simmons	#15; Cooper	#17; Gantner	#4; Molitor	#19; Yount	#24; Oglivie	#20; Thomas	#22; Moore	#30; Haas	#7; Money
88	July 17	CWS	#23; Simmons	#15; Cooper	#17; Gantner	#4; Molitor	#19; Yount	#24; Oglivie	#20; Thomas	#22; Moore	#10; McClure	#7; Money
89	July 18	CWS	#23; Simmons	#15; Cooper	#17; Gantner	#4; Molitor	#19; Yount	#24; Oglivie	#20; Thomas	#22; Moore	#35; Lerch	#7; Money
93	July 23	@ KC	#23; Simmons	#15; Cooper	#17; Gantner	#4; Molitor	#19; Yount	#24; Oglivie	#20; Thomas	#22; Moore	#10; McClure	#7; Money
94	July 24	@ KC	#23; Simmons	#15; Cooper	#17; Gantner	#4; Molitor	#19; Yount	#24; Oglivie	#20; Thomas	#22; Moore	#50; Vuckovich	#13; Howell
95	July 25	@ KC	#23; Simmons	#15; Cooper	#17; Gantner	#4; Molitor	#19; Yount	#24; Oglivie	#20; Thomas	#22; Moore	#35; Lerch	#7; Money

August

#	Date	Opponent	C	1B	2B	3B	SS	LF	CF	RF	P	DH
121	August 20	@ SEA									#48; Caldwell	#13; Howell
122	August 21	@ SEA									#33; Medich	#13; Howell
123	August 22	@ SEA									#30; Haas	#7; Money
124	August 23	@ CAL	#23; Simmons	#15; Cooper	#17; Gantner	#4; Molitor	#19; Yount	#24; Oglivie	#20; Thomas	#22; Moore	#10; McClure	#13; Howell
125	August 24	@ CAL	#23; Simmons	#15; Cooper	#17; Gantner	#4; Molitor	#19; Yount	#24; Oglivie	#20; Thomas	#22; Moore	#50; Vuckovich	#13; Howell
130	August 30	SEA									#50; Vuckovich	#13; Howell
131	August 31	SEA									#48; Caldwell	#7; Money

September

#	Date	Opponent	C	1B	2B	3B	SS	LF	CF	RF	P	DH
132	September 1	SEA									#33; Medich	#13; Howell
135	September 3	CAL	#23; Simmons	#15; Cooper	#17; Gantner	#4; Molitor	#19; Yount	#29; Brouhard	#20; Thomas	#22; Moore	#10; McClure	#7; Money
136	September 4	CAL	#23; Simmons	#15; Cooper	#17; Gantner	#4; Molitor	#19; Yount	#16; Edwards	#20; Thomas	#22; Moore	#50; Vuckovich	#13; Howell
137	September 5	CAL	#5; Yost	#15; Cooper	#17; Gantner	#4; Molitor	#19; Yount	#29; Brouhard	#20; Thomas	#22; Moore	#48; Caldwell	#7; Money
138	September 6	DET									#33; Medich	#13; Howell
139	September 7	DET									#21; Sutton	#13; Howell
140	September 8	DET									#10; McClure	#13; Howell
145	September 13	@ DET									#30; Haas	#13; Howell
146	September 14	@ DET									#33; Medich	#7; Money
147	September 15	@ DET									#50; Vuckovich	#13; Howell
151	September 20	BOS	#23; Simmons	#15; Cooper	#17; Gantner	#4; Molitor	#19; Yount	#24; Oglivie	#20; Thomas	#22; Moore	#50; Vuckovich	#13; Howell
152	September 21	BOS	#23; Simmons	#15; Cooper	#17; Gantner	#4; Molitor	#19; Yount	#24; Oglivie	#20; Thomas	#22; Moore	#33; Medich	#13; Howell
153	September 22	BOS	#23; Simmons	#15; Cooper	#17; Gantner	#4; Molitor	#19; Yount	#24; Oglivie	#20; Thomas	#22; Moore	#48; Caldwell	#13; Howell
154	September 24	BAL	#23; Simmons	#15; Cooper	#17; Gantner	#4; Molitor	#19; Yount	#24; Oglivie	#20; Thomas	#22; Moore	#21; Sutton	#7; Money
155	September 25	BAL	#23; Simmons	#15; Cooper	#17; Gantner	#4; Molitor	#19; Yount	#24; Oglivie	#20; Thomas	#22; Moore	#50; Vuckovich	#13; Howell
156	September 26	BAL	#23; Simmons	#15; Cooper	#17; Gantner	#4; Molitor	#19; Yount	#24; Oglivie	#20; Thomas	#22; Moore	#48; Caldwell	#13; Howell
157	September 28	@ BOS	#23; Simmons	#15; Cooper	#17; Gantner	#4; Molitor	#19; Yount	#24; Oglivie	#20; Thomas	#22; Moore	#33; Medich	#13; Howell
158	September 29	@ BOS	#23; Simmons	#15; Cooper	#17; Gantner	#4; Molitor	#19; Yount	#24; Oglivie	#20; Thomas	#22; Moore	#21; Sutton	#7; Money
159	September 30	@ BOS	#23; Simmons	#15; Cooper	#17; Gantner	#4; Molitor	#19; Yount	#24; Oglivie	#20; Thomas	#22; Moore	#41; Slaton	#13; Howell

October

#	Date	Opponent	C	1B	2B	3B	SS	LF	CF	RF	P	DH
160	October 1	@ BAL	#23; Simmons	#15; Cooper	#17; Gantner	#4; Molitor	#19; Yount	#24; Oglivie	#20; Thomas	#22; Moore	#50; Vuckovich	#13; Howell
161	October 1	@ BAL	#5; Yost	#15; Cooper	#17; Gantner	#4; Molitor	#19; Yount	#24; Oglivie	#20; Thomas	#22; Moore	#48; Caldwell	#13; Howell
162	October 2	@ BAL	#23; Simmons	#15; Cooper	#17; Gantner	#4; Molitor	#19; Yount	#24; Oglivie	#20; Thomas	#22; Moore	#33; Medich	#7; Money
163	October 3	@ BAL	#23; Simmons	#15; Cooper	#11; Romero	#4; Molitor	#19; Yount	#24; Oglivie	#20; Thomas	#22; Moore	#21; Sutton	#13; Howell

=== Postseason ===
==== Batting Order ====
1982 Postseason Batting Order game log
American League Championship Series: vs. California Angels

#	Date	Opponent	1st	2nd	3rd	4th	5th	6th	7th	8th	9th
1	October 5	@ CAL	#4; Molitor (3B)	#19; Yount (SS)	#15; Cooper (1B)	#23; Simmons (C)	#20; Thomas (CF)	#24; Oglivie (LF)	#7; Money (DH)	#22; Moore (RF)	#17; Gantner (2B)
2	October 6	@ CAL	#4; Molitor (3B)	#19; Yount (SS)	#15; Cooper (1B)	#23; Simmons (C)	#24; Oglivie (LF)	#20; Thomas (CF)	#13; Howell (DH)	#22; Moore (RF)	#17; Gantner (2B)
3	October 8	CAL	#4; Molitor (3B)	#19; Yount (SS)	#15; Cooper (1B)	#23; Simmons (C)	#20; Thomas (CF)	#24; Oglivie (LF)	#7; Money (DH)	#22; Moore (RF)	#17; Gantner (2B)
4	October 9	CAL	#4; Molitor (3B)	#19; Yount (SS)	#15; Cooper (1B)	#23; Simmons (C)	#20; Thomas (CF)	#7; Money (DH)	#29; Brouhard (LF)	#22; Moore (RF)	#17; Gantner (2B)
5	October 10	CAL	#4; Molitor (3B)	#19; Yount (SS)	#15; Cooper (1B)	#23; Simmons (C)	#20; Thomas (CF)	#24; Oglivie (LF)	#7; Money (DH)	#22; Moore (RF)	#17; Gantner (2B)

World Series: vs. St. Louis Cardinals

#	Date	Opponent	1st	2nd	3rd	4th	5th	6th	7th	8th	9th
1	October 12	@ STL	#4; Molitor (3B)	#19; Yount (SS)	#15; Cooper (1B)	#23; Simmons (C)	#24; Oglivie (LF)	#20; Thomas (CF)	#13; Howell (DH)	#22; Moore (RF)	#17; Gantner (2B)
2	October 13	@ STL	#4; Molitor (3B)	#19; Yount (SS)	#15; Cooper (1B)	#23; Simmons (C)	#24; Oglivie (LF)	#20; Thomas (CF)	#13; Howell (DH)	#22; Moore (RF)	#17; Gantner (2B)
3	October 15	STL	#4; Molitor (3B)	#19; Yount (SS)	#15; Cooper (1B)	#23; Simmons (C)	#24; Oglivie (LF)	#20; Thomas (CF)	#13; Howell (DH)	#22; Moore (RF)	#17; Gantner (2B)
4	October 16	STL	#4; Molitor (3B)	#19; Yount (SS)	#15; Cooper (1B)	#23; Simmons (C)	#24; Oglivie (LF)	#20; Thomas (CF)	#7; Money (DH)	#22; Moore (RF)	#17; Gantner (2B)
5	October 17	STL	#4; Molitor (3B)	#19; Yount (SS)	#15; Cooper (1B)	#23; Simmons (C)	#24; Oglivie (LF)	#20; Thomas (CF)	#7; Money (DH)	#22; Moore (RF)	#17; Gantner (2B)
6	October 19	@ STL	#4; Molitor (3B)	#19; Yount (SS)	#15; Cooper (1B)	#23; Simmons (C)	#24; Oglivie (LF)	#20; Thomas (CF)	#7; Money (DH)	#22; Moore (RF)	#17; Gantner (2B)
7	October 20	@ STL	#4; Molitor (3B)	#19; Yount (SS)	#15; Cooper (1B)	#23; Simmons (C)	#24; Oglivie (LF)	#20; Thomas (CF)	#13; Howell (DH)	#22; Moore (RF)	#17; Gantner (2B)

==== Defensive Lineup ====
1982 Postseason Defensive Lineup game log
American League Championship Series: vs. California Angels

#	Date	Opponent	C	1B	2B	3B	SS	LF	CF	RF	P	DH
1	October 5	@ CAL	#23; Simmons	#15; Cooper	#17; Gantner	#4; Molitor	#19; Yount	#24; Oglivie	#20; Thomas	#22; Moore	#48; Caldwell	#7; Money
2	October 6	@ CAL	#23; Simmons	#15; Cooper	#17; Gantner	#4; Molitor	#19; Yount	#24; Oglivie	#20; Thomas	#22; Moore	#50; Vuckovich	#13; Howell
3	October 8	CAL	#23; Simmons	#15; Cooper	#17; Gantner	#4; Molitor	#19; Yount	#24; Oglivie	#20; Thomas	#22; Moore	#21; Sutton	#7; Money
4	October 9	CAL	#23; Simmons	#15; Cooper	#17; Gantner	#4; Molitor	#19; Yount	#29; Brouhard	#20; Thomas	#22; Moore	#30; Haas	#7; Money
5	October 10	CAL	#23; Simmons	#15; Cooper	#17; Gantner	#4; Molitor	#19; Yount	#24; Oglivie	#20; Thomas	#22; Moore	#50; Vuckovich	#7; Money

World Series: vs. St. Louis Cardinals

#	Date	Opponent	C	1B	2B	3B	SS	LF	CF	RF	P	DH
1	October 12	@ STL	#23; Simmons	#15; Cooper	#17; Gantner	#4; Molitor	#19; Yount	#24; Oglivie	#20; Thomas	#22; Moore	#48; Caldwell	#13; Howell
2	October 13	@ STL	#23; Simmons	#15; Cooper	#17; Gantner	#4; Molitor	#19; Yount	#24; Oglivie	#20; Thomas	#22; Moore	#21; Sutton	#13; Howell
3	October 15	STL	#23; Simmons	#15; Cooper	#17; Gantner	#4; Molitor	#19; Yount	#24; Oglivie	#20; Thomas	#22; Moore	#50; Vuckovich	#13; Howell
4	October 16	STL	#23; Simmons	#15; Cooper	#17; Gantner	#4; Molitor	#19; Yount	#24; Oglivie	#20; Thomas	#22; Moore	#30; Haas	#7; Money
5	October 17	STL	#23; Simmons	#15; Cooper	#17; Gantner	#4; Molitor	#19; Yount	#24; Oglivie	#20; Thomas	#22; Moore	#48; Caldwell	#7; Money
6	October 19	@ STL	#23; Simmons	#15; Cooper	#17; Gantner	#4; Molitor	#19; Yount	#24; Oglivie	#20; Thomas	#22; Moore	#21; Sutton	#7; Money
7	October 20	@ STL	#23; Simmons	#15; Cooper	#17; Gantner	#4; Molitor	#19; Yount	#24; Oglivie	#20; Thomas	#22; Moore	#50; Vuckovich	#13; Howell

== Game Umpires ==
=== Regular Season ===
1982 Regular Season Umpire game log
April

#	Date	Opponent	HP	1B	2B	3B
15	April 27	CWS	#2; Nick Bremigan	#18; Greg Kosc	#14; Steve Palermo	#7; Dave Phillips (crew chief)
16	April 28	CWS	#18; Greg Kosc	#14; Steve Palermo	(none)	#7; Dave Phillips (crew chief)

May

#	Date	Opponent	HP	1B	2B	3B
20	May 3	KC	#9; BIll Kunkel (crew chief)	#12; Terry Cooney	(none)	#32; Dallas Parks
21	May 4	KC	#32; Dallas Parks	#12; Terry Cooney	(none)	#9; BIll Kunkel (crew chief)
22	May 5	KC	#32; Dallas Parks	#27; Rocky Roe	#9; BIll Kunkel (crew chief)	#12; Terry Cooney
27	May 10	@ KC	#19; Rich Garcia	#11; Don Kenkinger (crew chief)	#5; Russ Goetz	#20; Dale Ford
28	May 11	@ KC	#11; Don Kenkinger (crew chief)	#5; Russ Goetz	#20; Dale Ford	#19; Rich Garcia
29	May 12	@ KC	#5; Russ Goetz	#20; Dale Ford	#19; Rich Garcia	#11; Don Kenkinger (crew chief)
30	May 13	@ CWS	#3; Jim Evans (crew chief)	#8; Jim McKean	#24; Al Clark	#35; Ted Hendry
31	May 14	@ CWS	#8; Jim McKean	#24; Al Clark	#35; Ted Hendry	#3; Jim Evans (crew chief)
32	May 15	@ CWS	#24; Al Clark	#35; Ted Hendry	#3; Jim Evans (crew chief)	#8; Jim McKean
33	May 16	@ CWS	#35; Ted Hendry	#3; Jim Evans (crew chief)	#8; Jim McKean	#24; Al Clark
34	May 18	CAL	#28; George Maloney	#21; Ken Kaiser	#6; Jerry Neudecker	#1; Bill Haller (crew chief)
35	May 19	CAL	#21; Ken Kaiser	#6; Jerry Neudecker	#1; Bill Haller (crew chief)	#28; George Maloney
36	May 20	CAL	#6; Jerry Neudecker	#1; Bill Haller (crew chief)	#28; George Maloney	#21; Ken Kaiser
37	May 21	SEA	#35; Ted Hendry	#8; Jim McKean	#3; Jim Evans (crew chief)	#24; Al Clark
38	May 22	SEA	#3; Jim Evans (crew chief)	#24; Al Clark	#8; Jim McKean	#35; Ted Hendry
39	May 23	SEA	#8; Jim McKean	#35; Ted Hendry	#24; Al Clark	#3; Jim Evans (crew chief)
42	May 27	@ CAL	#8; Jim McKean	#24; Al Clark	#3; Jim Evans (crew chief)	#27; Rocky Roe
43	May 28	@ CAL	#24; Al Clark	#3; Jim Evans (crew chief)	#27; Rocky Roe	#8; Jim McKean
44	May 29	@ CAL	#3; Jim Evans (crew chief)	#27; Rocky Roe	#8; Jim McKean	#24; Al Clark
45	May 30	@ CAL	#27; Rocky Roe	#8; Jim McKean	#24; Al Clark	#3; Jim Evans (crew chief)
46	May 31	@ SEA	#14; Steve Palermo	#2; Nick Bremigan	#7; Dave Phillips (crew chief)	#18; Greg Kosc

June

#	Date	Opponent	HP	1B	2B	3B
47	June 1	@ SEA	#7; Dave Phillips (crew chief)	#18; Greg Kosc	#2; Nick Bremigan	#14; Steve Palermo
48	June 2	@ SEA	#2; Nick Bremigan	#14; Steve Palermo	#18; Greg Kosc	#7; Dave Phillips (crew chief)
52	June 7	BAL	#27; Rocky Roe (crew chief)	#34; Dan Morrison	(none)	#36; Tim McClelland
53	June 8	BAL	#33; Durwood Merrill	#31; Mike Reilly	#22; Larry Barnett (crew chief)	#27; Rocky Roe
54	June 9	BAL	#31; Mike Reilly (crew chief)	#34; Dan Morrison	#27; Rocky Roe	#33; Durwood Merrill
55	June 10	BAL	#34; Dan Morrison	#27; Rocky Roe	#33; Durwood Merrill	#31; Mike Reilly (crew chief)
56	June 11	DET	#5; Russ Goetz	#11; Don Kenkinger (crew chief)	(none)	#19; Rich Garcia
57	June 12	DET	#11; Don Kenkinger (crew chief)	#19; Rich Garcia	#25; Mark Johnson	#5; Russ Goetz
58	June 13	DET	#19; Rich Garcia	#25; Mark Johnson	#5; Russ Goetz	#11; Don Kenkinger (crew chief)
59	June 14	@ BAL	#6; Jerry Neudecker	#1; Bill Haller (crew chief)	#28; George Maloney	#21; Ken Kaiser
60	June 15	@ BAL	#1; Bill Haller (crew chief)	#28; George Maloney	#21; Ken Kaiser	#6; Jerry Neudecker
61	June 16	@ BAL	#28; George Maloney	#21; Ken Kaiser	#6; Jerry Neudecker	#1; Bill Haller (crew chief)
62	June 17	@ DET	#21; Ken Kaiser	#6; Jerry Neudecker	#1; Bill Haller (crew chief)	#28; George Maloney
63	June 18	@ DET	#6; Jerry Neudecker	#1; Bill Haller (crew chief)	#28; George Maloney	#21; Ken Kaiser
64	June 19	@ DET	#1; Bill Haller (crew chief)	#28; George Maloney	#21; Ken Kaiser	#6; Jerry Neudecker
65	June 20	@ DET	#28; George Maloney	#21; Ken Kaiser	#6; Jerry Neudecker	#1; Bill Haller (crew chief)
69	June 25	@ BOS	#11; Don Kenkinger (crew chief)	#20; Dale Ford	#5; Russ Goetz	#36; Tim McClelland
70	June 26	@ BOS	#20; Dale Ford	#5; Russ Goetz	#36; Tim McClelland	#11; Don Kenkinger (crew chief)
71	June 27	@ BOS	#5; Russ Goetz	#36; Tim McClelland	#11; Don Kenkinger (crew chief)	#20; Dale Ford
72	June 28	@ BOS	#36; Tim McClelland	#11; Don Kenkinger (crew chief)	#20; Dale Ford	#5; Russ Goetz

July

#	Date	Opponent	HP	1B	2B	3B
76	July 2	BOS	#25; Mark Johnson	#11; Don Kenkinger (crew chief)	#20; Dale Ford	#23; Rick Reed
77	July 3	BOS	#11; Don Kenkinger (crew chief)	#20; Dale Ford	#23; Rick Reed	#25; Mark Johnson
78	July 4	BOS	#20; Dale Ford	#23; Rick Reed	#25; Mark Johnson	#11; Don Kenkinger (crew chief)
79	July 5	@ CWS	#23; Rick Reed	#25; Mark Johnson	#19; Rich Garcia	#11; Don Kenkinger (crew chief)
82	July 9	KC	#37; Drew Coble	#35; Ted Hendry	#10; Larry McCoy	#6; Jerry Neudecker (crew chief)
83	July 10	KC	#35; Ted Hendry	#10; Larry McCoy	#6; Jerry Neudecker (crew chief)	#37; Drew Coble
84	July 11	KC	#10; Larry McCoy	#6; Jerry Neudecker (crew chief)	#37; Drew Coble	#35; Ted Hendry
85	July 15	CWS	#21; Ken Kaiser	#1; Bill Haller (crew chief)	#28; George Maloney	#36; Tim McClelland
86	July 15	CWS	#1; Bill Haller (crew chief)	#28; George Maloney	#36; Tim McClelland	#21; Ken Kaiser
87	July 16	CWS	#28; George Maloney	#36; Tim McClelland	#21; Ken Kaiser	#1; Bill Haller (crew chief)
88	July 17	CWS	#36; Tim McClelland	#21; Ken Kaiser	#1; Bill Haller (crew chief)	#28; George Maloney
89	July 18	CWS	#21; Ken Kaiser	#1; Bill Haller (crew chief)	#28; George Maloney	#36; Tim McClelland
93	July 23	@ KC	#9; BIll Kunkel (crew chief)	#12; Terry Cooney	#26; Vic Voltaggio	#29; John Shulock
94	July 24	@ KC	#26; Vic Voltaggio	#29; John Shulock	#9; BIll Kunkel (crew chief)	#12; Terry Cooney
95	July 25	@ KC	#29; John Shulock	#9; BIll Kunkel (crew chief)	#12; Terry Cooney	#26; Vic Voltaggio

August

#	Date	Opponent	HP	1B	2B	3B
121	August 20	@ SEA	#14; Steve Palermo	#32; Dallas Parks	#18; Greg Kosc	#7; Dave Phillips (crew chief)
122	August 21	@ SEA	#18; Greg Kosc	#7; Dave Phillips (crew chief)	#32; Dallas Parks	#14; Steve Palermo
123	August 22	@ SEA	#32; Dallas Parks	#14; Steve Palermo	#7; Dave Phillips (crew chief)	#18; Greg Kosc
124	August 23	@ CAL	#25; Mark Johnson	#29; John Shulock	#9; BIll Kunkel (crew chief)	#36; Tim McClelland
125	August 24	@ CAL	#29; John Shulock	#9; BIll Kunkel (crew chief)	#36; Tim McClelland	#25; Mark Johnson
130	August 30	SEA	#11; Don Kenkinger (crew chief)	#20; Dale Ford	#19; Rich Garcia	#5; Russ Goetz
131	August 31	SEA	#19; Rich Garcia	#5; Russ Goetz	#20; Dale Ford	#11; Don Kenkinger (crew chief)

September

#	Date	Opponent	HP	1B	2B	3B
132	September 1	SEA	#20; Dale Ford	#11; Don Kenkinger (crew chief)	#5; Russ Goetz	#19; Rich Garcia
135	September 3	CAL	#19; Rich Garcia	#20; Dale Ford	#5; Russ Goetz	#11; Don Kenkinger (crew chief)
136	September 4	CAL	#20; Dale Ford	#5; Russ Goetz	#11; Don Kenkinger (crew chief)	#19; Rich Garcia
137	September 5	CAL	#5; Russ Goetz	#11; Don Kenkinger (crew chief)	#19; Rich Garcia	#20; Dale Ford
138	September 6	DET	#3; Jim Evans (crew chief)	#24; Al Clark	#8; Jim McKean	#35; Ted Hendry
139	September 7	DET	#24; Al Clark	#8; Jim McKean	#35; Ted Hendry	#3; Jim Evans (crew chief)
140	September 8	DET	#8; Jim McKean	#35; Ted Hendry	#3; Jim Evans (crew chief)	#24; Al Clark
145	September 13	@ DET	#27; Rocky Roe	#33; Durwood Merrill	#22; Larry Barnett (crew chief)	#31; Mike Reilly
146	September 14	@ DET	#33; Durwood Merrill	#22; Larry Barnett (crew chief)	#31; Mike Reilly	#27; Rocky Roe
147	September 15	@ DET	#22; Larry Barnett (crew chief)	#31; Mike Reilly	#27; Rocky Roe	#33; Durwood Merrill
151	September 20	BOS	#18; Greg Kosc	#14; Steve Palermo	#7; Dave Phillips (crew chief)	#2; Nick Bremigan
152	September 21	BOS	#14; Steve Palermo	#7; Dave Phillips (crew chief)	#2; Nick Bremigan	#18; Greg Kosc
153	September 22	BOS	#7; Dave Phillips (crew chief)	#2; Nick Bremigan	#18; Greg Kosc	#14; Steve Palermo
154	September 24	BAL	#3; Jim Evans (crew chief)	#24; Al Clark	#8; Jim McKean	#35; Ted Hendry
155	September 25	BAL	#24; Al Clark	#8; Jim McKean	#35; Ted Hendry	#3; Jim Evans (crew chief)
156	September 26	BAL	#8; Jim McKean	#35; Ted Hendry	#3; Jim Evans (crew chief)	#24; Al Clark
157	September 28	@ BOS	#6; Jerry Neudecker	#28; George Maloney	#1; Bill Haller (crew chief)	#21; Ken Kaiser
158	September 29	@ BOS	#28; George Maloney	#1; Bill Haller (crew chief)	#21; Ken Kaiser	#6; Jerry Neudecker
159	September 30	@ BOS	#1; Bill Haller (crew chief)	#21; Ken Kaiser	#6; Jerry Neudecker	#28; George Maloney

October

#	Date	Opponent	HP	1B	2B	3B
160	October 1	@ BAL	#3; Jim Evans	#22; Larry Barnett	#19; Rich Garcia	#11; Don Kenkinger (crew chief)
161	October 1	@ BAL	#22; Larry Barnett	#19; Rich Garcia	#11; Don Kenkinger (crew chief)	#3; Jim Evans
162	October 2	@ BAL	#19; Rich Garcia	#11; Don Kenkinger (crew chief)	#3; Jim Evans	#22; Larry Barnett
163	October 3	@ BAL	#11; Don Kenkinger (crew chief)	#3; Jim Evans	#22; Larry Barnett	#19; Rich Garcia

=== Postseason ===
1982 Postseason Umpire game log
American League Championship Series: vs. California Angels

#	Date	Opponent	HP	1B	2B	3B	LF	RF
1	October 5	@ CAL	#22; Larry Barnett	#9; BIll Kunkell	#19; Rich Garcia	#14; Steve Palermo	#11; Don Kenkinger (crew chief)	#24; Al Clark
2	October 6	@ CAL	#9; BIll Kunkell	#19; Rich Garcia	#14; Steve Palermo	#11; Don Kenkinger (crew chief)	#24; Al Clark	#22; Larry Barnett
3	October 8	CAL	#19; Rich Garcia	#14; Steve Palermo	#11; Don Kenkinger (crew chief)	#24; Al Clark	#22; Larry Barnett	#9; BIll Kunkell
4	October 9	CAL	#14; Steve Palermo	#11; Don Kenkinger (crew chief)	#24; Al Clark	#22; Larry Barnett	#19; Rich Garcia	#9; BIll Kunkell
5	October 10	CAL	#11; Don Kenkinger (crew chief)	#24; Al Clark	#22; Larry Barnett	#9; BIll Kunkell	#19; Rich Garcia	#14; Steve Palermo

World Series: vs. St. Louis Cardinals

#	Date	Opponent	HP	1B	2B	3B	LF	RF
1	October 12	@ STL	#23; Lee Weyer (NL) (crew chief)	#1; Bill Haller (AL)	#9; John Kibler (NL)	#7; Dave Phillips (AL)	#4; Satch Davidson (NL)	#3; Jim Evans (AL)
2	October 13	@ STL	#1; Bill Haller (AL)	#9; John Kibler (NL)	#7; Dave Phillips (AL)	#4; Satch Davidson (NL)	#3; Jim Evans (AL)	#23; Lee Weyer (NL) (crew chief)
3	October 15	STL	#9; John Kibler (NL)	#7; Dave Phillips (AL)	#4; Satch Davidson (NL)	#3; Jim Evans (AL)	#23; Lee Weyer (NL) (crew chief)	#1; Bill Haller (AL)
4	October 16	STL	#7; Dave Phillips (AL)	#4; Satch Davidson (NL)	#3; Jim Evans (AL)	#23; Lee Weyer (NL) (crew chief)	#1; Bill Haller (AL)	#9; John Kibler (NL)
5	October 17	STL	#4; Satch Davidson (NL)	#3; Jim Evans (AL)	#23; Lee Weyer (NL) (crew chief)	#1; Bill Haller (AL)	#9; John Kibler (NL)	#7; Dave Phillips (AL)
6	October 19	@ STL	#3; Jim Evans (AL)	#23; Lee Weyer (NL) (crew chief)	#1; Bill Haller (AL)	#9; John Kibler (NL)	#7; Dave Phillips (AL)	#4; Satch Davidson (NL)
7	October 20	@ STL	#23; Lee Weyer (NL) (crew chief)	#1; Bill Haller (AL)	#9; John Kibler (NL)	#7; Dave Phillips (AL)	#4; Satch Davidson (NL)	#3; Jim Evans (AL)

== Player stats ==
= Indicates team leader

= Indicates league leader

=== Batting ===
==== Starters by position ====
Note: Pos = Position; G = Games played; AB = At bats; H = Hits; Avg. = Batting average; HR = Home runs; RBI = Runs batted in

Pos	Player	G	AB	H	Avg.	HR	RBI
C	Ted Simmons	137	539	145	.269	23	97
1B	Cecil Cooper	155	654	205	.313	32	121
2B	Jim Gantner	132	447	132	.295	4	43
3B	Paul Molitor	160	666	201	.302	19	71
SS	Robin Yount	156	635	210	.331	29	114
LF	Ben Oglivie	159	602	147	.244	34	102
CF	Gorman Thomas	158	567	139	.245	39	112
RF	Charlie Moore	133	456	116	.254	6	45
DH	Roy Howell	98	300	78	.260	4	38

==== Other batters ====
Note: G = Games played; AB = At bats; H = Hits; Avg. = Batting average; HR = Home runs; RBI = Runs batted in

Player	G	AB	H	Avg.	HR	RBI
Don Money	96	275	78	.284	16	55
Marshall Edwards	69	178	44	.247	2	14
Ed Romero	52	144	36	.250	1	7
Mark Brouhard	40	108	29	.269	4	10
Ned Yost	40	98	27	.276	1	8
Larry Hisle	9	31	4	.129	2	5
Rob Picciolo	22	21	6	.286	0	1
Kevin Bass	18	9	0	.000	0	0
Bob Skube	4	3	2	.667	0	0

=== Pitching ===
==== Starting pitchers ====
Note: G = Games pitched; IP = Innings pitched; W = Wins; L = Losses; ERA = Earned run average; SO = Strikeouts

Player	G	IP	W	L	ERA	SO
Mike Caldwell	35	258.0	17	13	3.91	75
Pete Vuckovich	30	223.2	18	6	3.34	105
Moose Haas	32	193.1	11	8	4.47	104
Bob McClure	34	172.2	12	7	4.22	99
Randy Lerch	21	108.2	8	7	4.97	33
Don Sutton	7	54.2	4	1	3.29	36

==== Other pitchers ====
Note: G = Games pitched; IP = Innings pitched; W = Wins; L = Losses; ERA = Earned run average; SO = Strikeouts

Player	G	IP	W	L	ERA	SO
Jim Slaton	39	117.2	10	6	3.29	59
Jerry Augustine	20	62.0	1	3	5.08	22
Doc Medich	10	63.0	5	4	5.00	36

==== Relief pitchers ====
Note: G = Games pitched; W = Wins; L = Losses; SV = Saves; ERA = Earned run average; SO = Strikeouts

Player	G	W	L	SV	ERA	SO
Rollie Fingers	50	5	6	29	2.60	71
Dwight Bernard	47	3	1	6	3.76	45
Jamie Easterly	28	0	2	2	4.70	16
Pete Ladd	16	1	3	3	4.00	12
Doug Jones	4	0	0	0	10.13	1
Chuck Porter	3	0	0	0	4.91	3

== Postseason ==
=== ALCS ===
==== Game 1, October 5 ====
Anaheim Stadium, Anaheim, California

Team	1	2	3	4	5	6	7	8	9	R	H	E
Milwaukee	0	2	1	0	0	0	0	0	0	3	7	2
California	1	0	4	2	1	0	0	0	X	8	10	0
W: Tommy John (1-0) L: Mike Caldwell (0-1) S: None
HR: MIL – Gorman Thomas (1) CAL – Fred Lynn (1)
Pitchers: MIL – Caldwell, Slaton (4), Ladd (7), Bernard (8) CAL – John
Attendance: 64,406

==== Game 2, October 6 ====
Anaheim Stadium, Anaheim, California

Team	1	2	3	4	5	6	7	8	9	R	H	E
Milwaukee	0	0	0	0	2	0	0	0	0	2	5	0
California	0	2	1	1	0	0	0	0	x	4	6	0
W: Bruce Kison (1-0) L: Pete Vuckovich (0-1) S: None
HR: MIL – Paul Molitor (1) CAL – Reggie Jackson (1)
Pitchers: MIL – Vuckovich CAL – Kison
Attendance: 64,179

==== Game 3, October 8 ====
Milwaukee County Stadium, Milwaukee, Wisconsin

Team	1	2	3	4	5	6	7	8	9	R	H	E
California	0	0	0	0	0	0	0	3	0	3	8	0
Milwaukee	0	0	0	3	0	0	2	0	0	5	6	0
W: Don Sutton (1-0) L: Geoff Zahn (0-1) S: Pete Ladd (1)
HR: CAL – Bob Boone (1) MIL – Paul Molitor (2)
Pitchers: CAL – Zahn, Witt (4), Hassler (7) MIL – Sutton, Ladd (8)
Attendance: 50,135

==== Game 4, October 9 ====
Milwaukee County Stadium, Milwaukee, Wisconsin

Team	1	2	3	4	5	6	7	8	9	R	H	E
California	0	0	0	0	0	1	0	4	0	5	5	3
Milwaukee	0	3	0	3	0	1	0	2	0	9	9	2
W: Moose Haas (1-0) L: Tommy John (1-1) S: Jim Slaton (1)
HR: CAL – Don Baylor (1) MIL – Mark Brouhard (1)
Pitchers: CAL – John, Goltz (4), Sanchez (8) MIL – Haas, Slaton (8)
Attendance: 51,003

==== Game 5, October 10 ====
Milwaukee County Stadium, Milwaukee, Wisconsin

Team	1	2	3	4	5	6	7	8	9	R	H	E
California	1	0	1	1	0	0	0	0	0	3	11	1
Milwaukee	1	0	0	1	0	0	2	0	x	4	6	4
W: Bob McClure (1-0) L: Luis Sánchez (0-1) S: Pete Ladd (1)
HR: CAL – None MIL – Ben Oglivie (1)
Pitchers: CAL – Kison, Sanchez (6), Hassler (7) MIL – Vuckovich, McClure (7), Ladd (9)
Attendance: 54,968

Game 5 proved to be the most dramatic of the series. The Angels got a quick 1-0 lead in the first on a double by Brian Downing and a single by Fred Lynn. But Milwaukee tied the game in the bottom of the inning when Paul Molitor doubled and eventually came home on a sacrifice fly by Ted Simmons. The Angels made it 2-1 in the third on an RBI single from Fred Lynn, and stretched the lead to 3-1 in the fourth on a run-scoring single from Bob Boone. Milwaukee cut the lead to 3-2 in the bottom of the fourth on Ben Oglivie's homer. The score remained unchanged until the bottom of the seventh, when disaster struck the Angels. Milwaukee loaded the bases on two singles and a walk. Cecil Cooper then cracked the series-winning hit, a two-run single that put the Brewers ahead 4-3. The Milwaukee bullpen kept the Angels off the board in the final two innings, and the Brewers took home the franchise's first American League pennant.

=== 1982 World Series ===
Though the teams had never met, the cities had an existing commercial rivalry in the beer market, as St. Louis is the home of Anheuser Busch while Milwaukee is the home of Miller Brewing. This led to the Series being nicknamed the "Suds Series".

Paul Molitor set a World Series record with his fifth hit in the 9th inning of Game 1. Robin Yount would set another record in the 7th inning of Game 5 by becoming the first player in Series history to have two four-hit games in one Series.

Cardinals catcher Darrell Porter was given the Series MVP award. Brewers pitcher Mike Caldwell, who won two games, would have been a strong candidate, as well as Molitor. Paul Molitor would eventually win the Series MVP Award 11 years later as a member of the Toronto Blue Jays. As it was, the winning team won the MVP. The only player on the losing team to win the MVP was Bobby Richardson of the 1960 New York Yankees.

Both participants are currently in the NL Central, due to the transfer of the Brewers from the American League to the National League in 1998. This raises the possibility of the Brewers eventually playing a World Series in two different leagues. The Brewers and Cardinals would meet again in the playoffs 29 years later, this time in the 2011 National League Championship Series with the Cardinals winning yet again in 6 games.

==== Game 1 ====
October 12, 1982, at Busch Stadium in St. Louis, Missouri

Team	1	2	3	4	5	6	7	8	9	R	H	E
Milwaukee Brewers	2	0	0	1	1	2	0	0	4	10	17	0
St. Louis Cardinals	0	0	0	0	0	0	0	0	0	0	3	1
W: Mike Caldwell (1-0) L: Bob Forsch (0-1)
HR: MIL Ted Simmons (1)

==== Game 2 ====
October 13, 1982, at Busch Stadium in St. Louis, Missouri

Team	1	2	3	4	5	6	7	8	9	R	H	E
Milwaukee Brewers	0	1	2	0	1	0	0	0	0	4	10	1
St. Louis Cardinals	0	0	2	0	0	2	0	1	X	5	8	0
W: Bruce Sutter (1-0) L: Bob McClure (0-1)
HR: MIL Ted Simmons (2)

==== Game 3 ====
October 15, 1982, at Milwaukee County Stadium in Milwaukee, Wisconsin

Team	1	2	3	4	5	6	7	8	9	R	H	E
St. Louis Cardinals	0	0	0	0	3	0	2	0	1	6	6	1
Milwaukee Brewers	0	0	0	0	0	0	0	2	0	2	5	3
W: Joaquín Andújar (1-0) S: Bruce Sutter (1) L: Pete Vuckovich (0-1)
HR: STL Willie McGee 2, (2) MIL Cecil Cooper (1)

The Brewers bats were initially stymied by Cardinals starter Joaquín Andújar, while rookie Willie McGee shocked everyone with two home runs off Brewers ace Pete Vuckovich, helping give the Cardinals a 5-0 lead. In a scary moment, Andújar was knocked out of the game when Cecil Cooper hit a line drive that hit Andújar in the leg, though the injury turned out to not be very serious. With bullpen ace Bruce Sutter pitching in relief, the Brewers attempted a comeback in the 8th inning. With two out, Cecil Cooper hit a 2-run homer to put Milwaukee on the board. The Brewers then got two base-runners, with Gorman Thomas representing the tying run. Thomas hit a deep fly ball to right-center field, but McGee, becoming the star of the game, made a leaping grab to rob Thomas of a potential game-tying home run. The Cardinals scored an insurance run in the 9th, and Sutter closed out the Brewers for the 6-2 Cardinals win and giving St. Louis a 2-1 Series lead.

==== Game 4 ====
October 16, 1982, at Milwaukee County Stadium in Milwaukee, Wisconsin

Team	1	2	3	4	5	6	7	8	9	R	H	E
St. Louis Cardinals	1	3	0	0	0	1	0	0	0	5	8	1
Milwaukee Brewers	0	0	0	0	1	0	6	0	X	7	10	2
W: Jim Slaton (1-0) S: Bob McClure (1) L: Doug Bair (0-1)

The Cardinals pounced early on Brewers starter Moose Haas, scoring 3 runs in the second and had a 5-1 lead going into the seventh inning. From there, the Brewers bats suddenly came alive. Jim Gantner started the scoring with an RBI double. After a Paul Molitor walk, Robin Yount followed with a bases-loaded 2-run single to put the Brewers within 1 run. Cecil Cooper then scored Molitor with an infield hit to tie the game. 3 batters later, with two outs, Gorman Thomas hit a 2-run double to give the Brewers the lead. Bob McClure then finished the Cardinals off for the save, giving the Brewers a crucial Game 4 win, tying the Series 2-2.

==== Game 5 ====
October 17, 1982, at Milwaukee County Stadium in Milwaukee, Wisconsin

Team	1	2	3	4	5	6	7	8	9	R	H	E
St. Louis Cardinals	0	0	1	0	0	0	1	0	2	4	15	2
Milwaukee Brewers	1	0	1	0	1	0	1	2	X	6	11	1
W: Mike Caldwell (2-0) S: Bob McClure (2) L: Bob Forsch (0-2)
HR: MIL Robin Yount (1)

==== Game 6 ====
October 19, 1982, at Busch Stadium in St. Louis, Missouri

Team	1	2	3	4	5	6	7	8	9	R	H	E
Milwaukee Brewers	0	0	0	0	0	0	0	0	1	1	4	4
St. Louis Cardinals	0	2	0	3	2	6	0	0	X	13	12	1
W: John Stuper (1-0) L: Don Sutton (0-1)
HR: STL Darrell Porter (1) Keith Hernandez (1)

==== Game 7 ====
October 20, 1982, at Busch Stadium in St. Louis, Missouri

Team	1	2	3	4	5	6	7	8	9	R	H	E
Milwaukee Brewers	0	0	0	0	1	2	0	0	0	3	7	0
St. Louis Cardinals	0	0	0	1	0	3	0	2	X	6	15	1
W: Joaquín Andújar (2-0) S: Bruce Sutter (2) L: Bob McClure (0-2)
HR: MIL Ben Oglivie (1)

Joaquín Andújar and Pete Vuckovich opposed each other once again. The game was scoreless until the bottom of the fourth when the Cardinals scored first on a Lonnie Smith RBI single. Ben Oglivie tied it for the Brew Crew in the fifth with a solo homer, and they took a 3-1 lead in the sixth when Jim Gantner scored on an error and Cecil Cooper hit a sacrifice fly.

But, in the bottom of the sixth, Vuckovich began to run into trouble. With one out, Ozzie Smith singled and Lonnie Smith doubled him to third. Brewers manager Harvey Kuenn then pulled Vuckovich in favor of Bob McClure, who intentionally walked pinch-hitter Gene Tenace to load the bases. Keith Hernandez then tied the game with a two-run single. George Hendrick then gave the Cardinals the lead with an RBI single.

The Cardinals punctuated the scoring with two runs in the eighth on RBI singles by Series MVP Darrell Porter and Steve Braun. Andújar pitched seven strong innings and Bruce Sutter pitched the eighth and ninth for his second save.

==== Composite box ====
1982 World Series (4-3): St. Louis Cardinals (N.L.) over Milwaukee Brewers (A.L.)

Team	1	2	3	4	5	6	7	8	9	R	H	E
St. Louis Cardinals	1	5	3	4	5	12	3	3	3	39	67	7
Milwaukee Brewers	3	1	3	1	5	4	7	4	5	33	64	11
Total Attendance: 384,570 Average Attendance: 54,939
Winning Player's Share: – $43,280, Losing Player's Share – $31,935 * Includes Playoffs and World Series

== Awards and honors ==
- Robin Yount, American League Most Valuable Player
- Cecil Cooper, Silver Slugger Award
- Pete Vuckovich, American League Cy Young Award
- Harvey Kuenn, Associated Press AL Manager of the Year

=== League leaders ===
- Paul Molitor – American League leader, At bats (666)
- Paul Molitor – American League leader. Runs (136)
- Robin Yount – American League leader, Hits (210)
- Robin Yount – American League leader, Doubles (46)
- Robin Yount – American League leader, Slugging Percentage (.578)
- Robin Yount – American League leader, Total Bases (367)
- Gorman Thomas – American League leader, Home Runs (39)*

*= Tied with Reggie Jackson

=== All-Stars ===
All-Star Game

Starters

- Robin Yount, SS
- Cecil Cooper, 1B

Reserves

- Ben Oglivie, OF
- Rollie Fingers, P

== Farm system ==
The Brewers' farm system consisted of five minor league affiliates in 1982.

Level	Team	League	Manager
Triple-A	Vancouver Canadians	Pacific Coast League	Dick Phillips
Double-A	El Paso Diablos	Texas League	Tony Muser
Class A	Stockton Ports	California League	Duane Espy
Class A	Beloit Brewers	Midwest League	Terry Bevington
Rookie	Pikeville Brewers	Appalachian League	Tim Nordbrook

== Popular Culture ==
Since 1982, as the only pennant-winning season in franchise history, the season is still held in high regard by Milwaukee Brewers fans, and all of the players continue to be remembered and honored by the franchise and fanbase. In 2007, the Brewers commemorated the 25th anniversary of the 1982 season, having miniature bobblehead giveaways for most of the key players from that season, and a ceremony honoring the team. In addition, MLB Productions produced a documentary about the team, "Harvey's Wallbangers: The 1982 Milwaukee Brewers". The documentary is occasionally aired in the off-season on MLB Network. The DVD release of the documentary includes the television broadcasts of the final inning of the Brewers' AL East division-clinching win, their 1982 postseason home runs, and the complete television broadcast of the pennant-clinching Game 5 of the American League Championship Series.

In 2024, an independent documentary was produced about the team, directed by Sean Hanish, called "Just A Bit Outside: The Story of the 1982 Milwaukee Brewers". The documentary features interviews with only players and staff from the 1982 Brewers, along with archival footage, including some of the last interviews of Brewers broadcaster Bob Uecker, who would pass away on January 16, 2025. The documentary premiered on September 11, 2024, and was shown in local Marcus Theaters, starting on September 13, 2024. The documentary is available for free streaming on Roku and Tubi.
