= Gordon Thomas =

Gordon Thomas may refer to:

- Gordon Thomas (author) (1933–2017), Welsh author
- Gordon Thomas (American football), American college football coach
- Gordon Thomas (outsider musician) (1916–2016), singer/songwriter/jazz trombonist
- Typeface (character), a fictional Marvel Comics antihero
- Gordon Thomas (cyclist) (1921–2013), British Olympic cyclist
- Gordon Thomas (politician) (1914–1997), mayor of East Lansing, Michigan

== See also ==
- Thomas Gordon (disambiguation)
