= Brewer Fever =

Fight song of the Milwaukee Brewers

"Brewer Fever" is the fight song of the Milwaukee Brewers, written in 1979. The song was played extensively at Milwaukee County Stadium during the Brewer's pennant season 1982. The song coincided with the team's advertising slogan during the time, "Brewer Fever- Catch It!", which would stay for much of the 1980s.

It was released locally as a single.
