= Thomas Gordon =

Thomas Gordon may refer to:

- Thomas Gordon (lawyer) (1652–1722), American lawyer and politician of the colonial period
- Thomas Gordon (Royal Scots Navy officer) (c. 1658–1741), Commodore in the Royal Scots Navy and then Admiral and Commander-in-Chief at Kronstadt of the Imperial Russian navy
- Thomas Gordon (writer) (c. 1691–1750), British writer
- Thomas Gordon (philosopher) (1714–1797), Scottish philosopher and antiquarian
- Thomas Gordon (British Army officer) (1788–1841), British army officer and historian
- Thomas Boston Gordon (1816–1891), civil war captain, lawyer and judge from Kentucky
- Thomas Edward Gordon (1832–1914), British traveller, author of a book about 19th-century Kashgaria
- Thomas Gisborne Gordon (1851–1935), Ireland rugby player
- Thomas Gordon (Australian politician) (1882–1949), Australian politician and businessman
- Thomas S. Gordon (1893–1959), U.S. Representative from Illinois
- Thomas C. Gordon (1915–2003), Virginia state supreme court justice
- Thomas Gordon (psychologist) (1918–2002), American clinical psychologist
- Thomas P. Gordon (born 1952), American politician and law enforcement expert
- Thomas Gordon (rugby union) (born 1997), Scottish rugby union player
- Thomas David Gordon (born 1954), professor and theologian
- Tom Gordon (born 1967), American baseball player
- Tom Gordon (priest) (born 1957), Dean of Leighlin
- Tom Gordon (American politician), member of the Arizona House of Representatives
- Tom Gordon (British politician) (elected 2024), MP in the UK House of Commons

== Fictional characters ==
- Thomas Gordon, a character from the Ghost Whisperer

== See also ==
- Gordon Thomas (disambiguation)
