= Mark Johnson (umpire) =

American baseball umpire (1950-2016

- Born: Mark Stephen Johnson; November 18, 1950; Louisville, Kentucky, U.S.
- Died: October 26, 2016 (aged 65); Honolulu, Hawaii, U.S.
- Years active: 1979–1999
- Known for: Umpire

Mark Stephen Johnson (November 18, 1950 – October 26, 2016) was an American professional baseball umpire who worked in the American League from 1979 to 1999, wearing uniform number 25 when the AL adopted them in 1980. Johnson was an umpire in the 1993 World Series and the 1990 and 1999 Major League Baseball All-Star Game. In his career, he umpired 1,979 Major League games.

== Early career ==
Johnson spent several years as a minor league umpire in the Gulf Coast League, Florida State League, Southern League and Pacific Coast League.

== Notable games ==
Johnson left a 1982 Oakland-Toronto game with a broken hand after a pitch from Matt Keough hit Willie Upshaw after which the ball then struck Johnson, who was working home plate. Third base umpire Rich Garcia replaced Johnson behind the plate.

He left a 1985 Yankees-Indians game by stretcher after being struck on the left side of the groin by a fastball from Brian Fisher. Although the ball glanced off the catcher's mitt of Ron Hassey, it still hit Johnson with enough force to injure him.

In 1994, Johnson and his crew received a police escort following a spring training game. In that game, Johnson had a heated confrontation with Gary DiSarcina. DiSarcina was ejected from the game, but claimed Johnson instigated the dispute by insulting DiSarcina's hitting ability. Two players alleged Johnson told DiSarcina, "You're a .220 hitter and I'm going to (get) you all year." The ejection was DiSarcina's first as a professional baseball player.

== Resignation ==
Johnson was one of 22 umpires who lost their jobs amid the 1999 Major League Umpires Association mass resignation. The resignations, which were intended as a bargaining strategy, backfired when Major League Baseball simply accepted them and hired replacements from the minor leagues.

== See also ==
- List of Major League Baseball umpires (disambiguation)
