= Russ Goetz =

American baseball umpire (1930–2017)

- Born: May 31, 1930; McKeesport, Pennsylvania, U.S.
- Died: March 15, 2017 (aged 86); McKeesport, Pennsylvania, U.S.
- Occupation: Umpire
- Years active: 1968-1983
- Employer: American League

Russell Louis Goetz (May 31, 1930 – March 15, 2017) was an American professional baseball umpire who worked in the American League from 1968 to 1983. Goetz umpired 2,384 major league games in his 16-year career. He umpired in two World Series (1973 and 1979), two All-Star Games (1970 and 1975) and four American League Championship Series (1970, 1974, 1977, and 1981).

Goetz wore uniform number 5 when the American League adopted numbers in 1980.

He was one of the last five umpires using the outside chest protector when he retired.

He enlisted in the United States Navy, serving during the Korean War era from October 1950 through November 1954.

Goetz died March 15, 2017, in McKeesport, Pennsylvania.

== See also ==
- List of Major League Baseball umpires (disambiguation)
- List of United States Navy people
