= Charlie Moore (baseball) =

American baseball player (1953–2026)

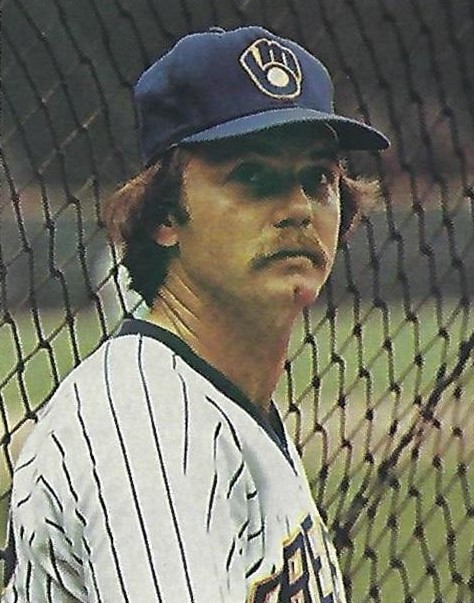
- Catcher, right fielder
- Born: June 21, 1953; Birmingham, Alabama, U.S.
- Died: May 23, 2026 (aged 72)
- Batted: Right Threw: Right

MLB debut
- September 8, 1973, for the Milwaukee Brewers

Last MLB appearance
- October 4, 1987, for the Toronto Blue Jays

MLB statistics
- Batting average: .261
- Home runs: 36
- Runs batted in: 408
- Stats at Baseball Reference

Teams
- Milwaukee Brewers (1973–1986); Toronto Blue Jays (1987)

Career highlights and awards
- Milwaukee Brewers Wall of Honor

Charles William Moore Jr. (June 21, 1953 – May 23, 2026) was an American professional baseball player in Major League Baseball (MLB), primarily as a catcher and outfielder (1973–1987). He played 14 seasons with the Milwaukee Brewers, and one season with the Toronto Blue Jays.

== Early years ==
Moore attended Minor High School in his hometown of Birmingham, Alabama and played quarterback on the football team. He originally planned to attend Auburn University on a football scholarship, but in June 1971 was selected by the Milwaukee Brewers in the fifth round of the 1971 MLB draft and elected to play professional baseball instead. He played in the Brewers' minor league system from 1971 through 1973, with the short season Class A Newark Co-Pilots (1971), Single-A Danville Warriors (1972), Double-A Shreveport Captains (1973), and Triple-A Evansville Triplets (1973).

== Major league career ==
=== Milwaukee Brewers ===
Moore made his major league debut with the Brewers on September 8, 1973, during a 15–1 loss to the New York Yankees. He appeared in a total of eight games late in the 1973 season, batting 5-for-27 (.185) with three RBIs. During the 1974 and 1975 seasons, Moore played 72 games (batting .245) and 73 games (batting .290), respectively. He played defensively at catcher through August 1975, then mostly as a left fielder through May 1976, at which time he returned to catching. During the 1976 season, he appeared in 87 games, batting .191 with three home runs and 16 RBIs. On October 3, 1976, at Milwaukee County Stadium, Moore was the last runner batted in by Hank Aaron, crossing the plate on Aaron's sixth-inning single in the Brewers' 5–2 loss to the Detroit Tigers.

His playing time then increased, as he appeared in 138 games in 1977 (batting .248), 96 games in 1978 (batting .269), and 111 games in both 1979 and 1980 (batting .300 and then .291). Moore hit for the cycle on October 1, 1980, in a Brewers 10–7 win over the California Angels. He also had two stolen bases in the game, becoming the only MLB player to have two steals in a game while also hitting for the cycle.

During the strike-shortened 1981 season, Moore appeared in 48 games, batting a career-high .301. He batted 2-for-9 (.222) in the 1981 ALDS, which the Brewers lost to the Yankees, 3 games to 2. Moore played 133 games in 1982, batting .254 and had 13 outfield assists, in his first year playing predominantly in right field. He hit 6-for-13 (.462) in the 1982 ALCS, and made an important defensive play in the fifth inning of the final game, throwing out Reggie Jackson at third base from right field, as the Brewers defeated the Angels, 3 games to 2. Moore then hit .346 (9-for-26) with three doubles and two RBIs in the 1982 World Series, which the Brewers lost to the St. Louis Cardinals in seven games.

Moore continued to play in right field during the next two seasons; in 1983 he played in a career-high 151 games, batting .284, and in 1984 he played in just 70 games while batting .234. During his final two seasons with Milwaukee, Moore returned to catching, playing in 105 games and batting .232 in 1985, and playing in 80 games and batting .260 in 1986. In November 1986, Moore became a free agent. The Brewers offered him a one-year contract, but with a significant pay cut (20 or 30 percent) as he only would have played in about 40 games; Moore called the offer "disgusting and insulting".

In his 14 seasons with the Brewers, Moore appeared in 1,283 regular season games, batting .262 with 35 home runs and 401 RBIs.

=== Toronto Blue Jays ===
Moore did not get signed by a major league team to start the 1987 season, so he played with the Single-A San Jose Bees through May. Later comments from Moore linked his lack of offers to collusion by owners. In early June, he was signed by the Toronto Blue Jays. Moore appeared in 51 games with the Blue Jays, batting .215 with one home run and seven RBIs. In the offseason, the Blue Jays did not re-sign Moore, bringing his career to a close.

== Post-playing career ==
After his playing career ended, and for more than fifteen years, Moore worked as a sales representative for a fastener company in his hometown of Birmingham.

In 2014, Moore was selected to the All-Time Alabama Baseball Team and to the Milwaukee Brewers Wall of Honor.

Moore was inducted into the Alabama Sports Hall of Fame as part of the 2025 Class.

== Death ==
Moore died on May 23, 2026, at the age of 72.

== See also ==
- List of Major League Baseball players to hit for the cycle

Achievements
Preceded by Gary Ward	Hitting for the cycle October 1, 1980	Succeeded by Frank White
