= Rocky Roe =

American baseball umpire (born 1950)

- Born: August 16, 1950 (age 75); Detroit, Michigan, U.S.
- Occupation: Former MLB umpire
- Years active: 1979–2001

John Andrew "Rocky" Roe (born August 16, 1950) is an American former umpire in Major League Baseball who worked in the American League from 1979 to 1999 and in both leagues in 2000 and 2001. He officiated in the 1990 and 1999 World Series, as well as the 1984 and 1994 All-Star Games. He also worked three American League Championship Series (1986, 1991, 1996) and four Division Series (1995, 1997, 1999, 2000). Roe wore uniform number 27 throughout his career.

== Early life ==
Roe grew up in Southfield, Michigan, and acquired his nickname because he was a fan of the popular major leaguer Rocky Colavito.

Roe played baseball at Eastern Michigan University, where he received his degree in business administration, and was a member of the winning 1970 NAIA national championship team.

Roe was inducted into Eastern Michigan University's Athletic Hall of Fame in 2001.

Roe played semi-pro baseball for the Liberal Bee Jays.

== Career ==
He was promoted to the American League staff on June 7, 1982, hours after Lou DiMuro was struck and killed by a passing motorist on a busy street in Arlington, Texas following a game between the Texas Rangers and Chicago White Sox. Roe's first crew included Larry Barnett, Mike Reilly and Durwood Merrill.

In 1996 he took a leave of absence to enter a weight loss program following the death of fellow umpire John McSherry; he took part in another health program in 2002. Roe submitted his resignation as part of a union strategy in 1999, but quickly reconsidered and withdrew his resignation, saying it was like "drinking Kool-Aid at a Jim Jones picnic"; his decision proved fortunate, as all submitted resignations were eventually accepted by Major League Baseball. He retired in 2002. In May 2026, Roe was on the ballot for the Michigan Sports Hall of Fame election.

=== Notable games ===
Roe was the home plate umpire on June 27, 1987, when Mark McGwire had the first three-home run game of his career, and was the second base umpire on September 14 of the same year when Cal Ripken Jr. ended his record streak of 8,243 consecutive innings played. Roe was behind the plate for the final game at Tiger Stadium.

== See also ==
- List of Major League Baseball umpires (disambiguation)
