= Al Clark (umpire) =

American baseball umpire (born 1948)

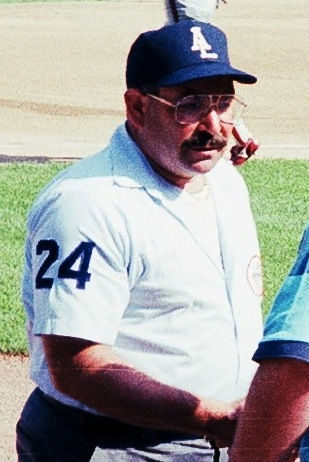
- Clark in 1992
- Born: Alan Marshall Clark; January 9, 1948 (age 78); Trenton, New Jersey, U.S.
- Education: Eastern Kentucky University
- Occupation: Umpire
- Years active: 1976–2001
- Employer(s): American League, Major League Baseball

Alan Marshall Clark (born January 9, 1948) is an American former professional baseball umpire who worked in the American League from 1976 to 1999, and throughout both Major Leagues in 2000 and 2001. He was fired for misuse of a credit card issued for professional expenses. Three years later, pled guilty to mail fraud for his involvement in a collectibles-selling scheme.

== Background ==
Clark is Jewish and his family's surname was originally 'Sklarz' before being anglicized by his grandfather. He grew up wanting to be a rabbi and made his bar mitzvah in an Orthodox synagogue.

Clark's father, Herb, was a sportswriter and the sports editor at The Times in Trenton, New Jersey. Raised in Ewing Township, New Jersey, Clark began umpiring while still a student at Ewing High School. He later graduated from Eastern Kentucky University.

== Career ==
Clark and fellow 1976 rookie Greg Kosc were the first American League umpires who never used the outside chest protector, which had been used since the league's formation in 1901 and was mandated in the 1920s by future Hall of Fame arbiter Tommy Connolly. In 1975, the year before Clark's hiring, the American League ruled umpires could use the outside protector or the National League standard inside protector, invented in the 1910s by another Hall of Fame umpire, Bill Klem. In 1977, the AL ruled all incoming umpires had to use the inside protector, an edict which affected new hires Steve Palermo and Durwood Merrill. Umpires active prior to 1977 using the outside (a.k.a. "balloon") protector could continue to use it until they retired or switched to the inside protector.

He wore uniform number 24 when the American League adopted them for its umpires in 1980, then retained the number when the NL and AL staffs were merged in 2000. Clark umpired 3,392 major league games in his 26-year career. He umpired in two World Series (1983 and 1989), two All-Star Games (1984 and 1995), five American League Championship Series (1979, 1982, 1987, 1992 and 1999), and three American League Division Series (1981, 1996 and 2000). Clark worked second base in the 1978 one-game playoff between the New York Yankees and the Boston Red Sox, which the Yankees won 5–4. He was the home plate umpire in Nolan Ryan's 300th career win on July 31, 1990.

In 1998, Clark was investigated over the sale of baseballs purported to have been used in David Wells' perfect game, in which his signature appeared on certificates of authenticity, even though he had not officiated the game. Clark claimed that his friend, collectibles dealer Richard Graessle, had forged his signature. He was cleared of wrongdoing by the league.

=== Firing ===
In 2001, Clark was fired by Major League Baseball after downgrading his first class airline tickets to economy class, thus either pocketing funds by selling extra tickets or to gain additional airline tickets for unapproved personal travel.

=== Criminal conviction ===
In 2004, Clark was indicted on federal mail fraud charges for his involvement in a scandal in which baseballs were authenticated as having been used in noteworthy games which they were not, thus inflating their value when sold to collectors. He and Graessle sold "hundreds of ordinary baseballs" as ones used in games that Clark had umpired, with certificates of authenticity bearing Clark's signature. In reality, they had never been used in those games, and were rubbed in the same mud that is used on regulation baseballs to make them appear used. He pled guilty to one count of mail fraud and was sentenced to four months in prison, followed by four months under house arrest.

== Personal life ==
As of 2008, Clark and his wife, Cynthia, live at Ford's Colony, a gated community in Williamsburg, Virginia.

In 2014, he released a memoir entitled Called Out but Safe: A Baseball Umpire's Journey.

== See also ==
- List of Major League Baseball umpires (disambiguation)
