= Ted Hendry =

American baseball umpire (born 1940)

- Born: Eugene Hendry; August 31, 1940 (age 85); Oregon City, Oregon, U.S.
- Occupation: Umpire
- Years active: 1977–1999
- Employer: American League

Eugene "Ted" Hendry (born August 31, 1940) is an American former professional baseball umpire who worked in the American League from 1977 to 1999, wearing uniform number 35 when the AL adopted numbers for its umpires in 1980. Hendry umpired 2,906 major league games in his 23-year career. He umpired in the 1990 World Series, two All-Star Games (1983 and 1995), four American League Championship Series (1985, 1988, 1993 and 1998), and the 1996 American League Division Series. Hendry was also the home plate umpire of Bret Saberhagen's no hitter in 1991 and Jim Abbott's no hitter in 1993.

== Major League Baseball Umpires' strike of 1979 ==
During the umpires' strike in 1979, Hendry was one of only two regular umpires (the other being Paul Pryor) to begin the season not on strike. Hendry and Pryor had already signed contracts before the strike began and both umpires joined the strike after giving the MLB the required ten days of notice that they were stepping down as well. The labor dispute was eventually settled in May of the same year.

== See also ==
- List of Major League Baseball umpires (disambiguation)
