= Gordon Thomas (politician) =

American politician

Mayor of East Lansing, Michigan
- In office 1961–1971

Personal details
- Born: December 4, 1914 Orpington, England
- Died: October 15, 1997 (aged 82)
- Party: Democratic
- Spouse: Phyllis Lenzner
- Education: Northwestern University; Michigan State University; Albion College

Gordon L. Thomas (December 4, 1914 – October 15, 1997) was the mayor of East Lansing, Michigan, from 1961 to 1971. He was a Democratic candidate for delegate to a constitutional convention to rewrite the Michigan Constitution during 1961 and 1962 from Ingham County's second district.

His service as mayor of East Lansing in the 1960s was amid college-town student civil rights and anti-war protests. He was president of the Michigan Municipal League and served as a member of the executive board of the National League of Cities.

== Biography ==
Gordon Thomas was born in Orpington, England, in 1914; his forebears included William Bevil Thomas, a Newfoundland merchant, and William Thomas, a member of the Newfoundland Parliament. Young Thomas immigrated to the United States as a boy. He graduated from the Oxford, Michigan, high school and earned a bachelor's degree from Albion College, a master's degree from Michigan State University (MSU) and a Ph.D. from Northwestern University. He married Phyllis Lenzner in 1941 and they had two children, David and Kathleen. He is the grandfather of Marc Thomas, elected Ingham County commissioner representing East Lansing, Michigan, from 2003 to 2009.

He was a Congregationalist.

Dr. Thomas joined the MSU faculty after returning from U.S. Army service in World War II and served as a communications professor until he retired in 1983. In addition to teaching, Thomas served in other roles at MSU, including as associate dean for the College of Communications Arts and Sciences from 1970 to 1973, and as secretary for academic governance from 1973 to 1983.

Thomas was elected to the East Lansing City Council in 1959, and served as the 17th mayor of East Lansing from 1961 to 1971. He was preceded in office by Harold F. Pletz (1959–1961) and succeeded by Wilbur B. Brookover (1971–1975). He was also president of the Michigan Municipal League in 1966 and 1967 and served on the Executive Board of the National League of Cities from 1968 to 1971. "Mayor Gordon L. Thomas of East Lansing, the new President of the Michigan Municipal League, is a well-known authority on parliamentary procedure and a professor of speech, in addition to being active in League affairs."

=== Role during civil-protest years ===
Student protests in the 1960s - from local concerns such as open housing to national policy on the Vietnam War - were common in East Lansing. The Detroit Free Press reported in 1965 about one such event, which culminated in a sit-in at city council chambers: "About 100 sign-toting students from Michigan State University picketed East Lansing City Hall for the second straight day Tuesday, seeking 'more affirmative action' against alleged racial discrimination in off-campus housing ... police spent an hour carrying the limp-bodied youngsters to a rear parking lot ... Midway through Tuesday's demonstration, Mayor Gordon Thomas agreed to meet with student leaders Monday on the MSU campus to discuss the problem."

Time magazine covered the 1971 East Lansing city election – and the effects of the 1971 26th Amendment granting 18-year-olds the right to vote. "Relying on his traditionally heavy support from the off-campus community, Thomas, 56, counted on two or three active volunteers to run his campaign and never appealed to the student vote. Still, the consensus of local political sages was that his election was a sure thing", Time reported. "They were wrong. Mayor Thomas, who admitted he was shocked by the results, was ousted and finished fourth behind Council Incumbent Wilbur Brookover who, near the end of the campaign, switched signals and began speaking and debating on campus."

The East Lansing Towne Courier reported in 1995: "After a 10-year stint as mayor, Thomas said it was difficult to name his greatest achievement while in office. 'I think it would have to be the passing of the open housing ordinance – we had no ordinance prohibiting discrimination in housing,' Thomas said. He recalled the ordinance initially failed with a 2-3 vote, but then passed unanimously a year or two later. 'No one said anything about it – we just passed it.' Also during his term as mayor, many things were built in the city, such as the library, the city garage and the water treatment plant."

In 1983, he received the Albion College Distinguished Alumni Award.

=== Death and legacy ===
Gordon Thomas died in 1997 in East Lansing. Upon his death, a Lansing State Journal editorial included the following insight: "For years, the name Gordon Thomas stood for the steady, stable foundation of East Lansing. From 1961 to 1971, the former mayor guided the city through the turmoil of civil disruption, war protests and rights marches. In later years, he remained a trusted adviser, a connoisseur of the city's rich history. Thomas' death this week diminishes the city. He understood the dynamics of a vibrant college town and helped lay the groundwork for nurturing a diverse community".

His remains were interred at Elkland Township Cemetery (also known as Cass City Cemetery), near Cass City, Tuscola County, Michigan.

== Published works ==
- Thomas, Gordon L. (1959). "Benjamin F. Butler, prosecutor". Quarterly Journal of Speech. 45 (3). Routledge: 288–298. doi:10.1080/00335635909382362. Published on behalf of the National Communication Association 95th Anniversary in 2009.
- Potter, David; Thomas, Gordon L. (1970). The Colonial Idiom. Carbondale, IL: Southern Illinois University Press. pp. 644. ISBN 978-0-8093-0431-8.
- Verburg, Kenneth; Thomas, Gordon L. (1982–1987). Conducting Public Meetings. East Lansing, Michigan: Michigan State University Press), Community Development Programs, Lifelong Education Programs.
