= Marshall Edwards =

American baseball player (1952–2025)

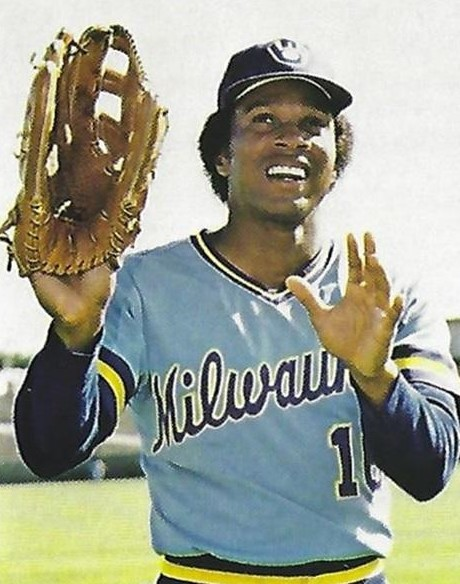
- Outfielder
- Born: August 27, 1952; Fort Lewis, Washington, U.S.
- Died: April 15, 2025 (aged 72); Union City, Georgia, U.S.
- Batted: Left Threw: Left

MLB debut
- April 11, 1981, for the Milwaukee Brewers

Last MLB appearance
- September 11, 1983, for the Milwaukee Brewers

MLB statistics
- Batting average: .267
- Home runs: 2
- Runs batted in: 23
- Stolen bases: 21
- Stats at Baseball Reference

Teams
- Milwaukee Brewers (1981–1983)

Marshall Lynn Edwards (August 27, 1952 – April 15, 2025) was an American professional baseball outfielder. He played three seasons in Major League Baseball (MLB) from 1981 to 1983 for the Milwaukee Brewers. Edwards' two brothers also played in the Major Leagues. His twin, Mike Edwards, played second base for the Pittsburgh Pirates and Oakland Athletics, and his younger brother, Dave Edwards, played outfield for the San Diego Padres and Minnesota Twins.

== Early baseball career ==
Edwards played baseball and ran track for Jefferson High School in Los Angeles. He played college baseball, first for Los Angeles Community College and then UCLA, alongside his brother Mike, from 1973 to 1974. Despite stealing 19 bases his senior year, a then school record, Edwards was not drafted by an MLB club and signed as a free agent with the Baltimore Orioles in 1974.

Edwards spent three seasons in the Orioles' minor league system, leading the Class A Florida State League with 57 stolen bases in 1976 and batting with a .334 average in 1977. In December 1977, the Brewers selected him in the Rule 5 Draft.

== Major League career ==
Edwards spent another three seasons in the minors, hitting 17 triples and stealing 68 bases for Vancouver in the Pacific Coast League in 1980, before making the Brewers opening day roster in 1981. He appeared in 40 games during the regular season, hitting .241 with six stolen bases and made the Brewers postseason roster. In the A.L. Division Series vs. the New York Yankees, Edwards pinch ran twice and had one hitless at-bat.

Edwards began the 1982 season back in Vancouver, but after staring the season with a .380 average, he was recalled by the Brewers. After batting .247 with 10 stolen bases over 69 games, Edwards again made the team's postseason roster. He made appearances as a pinch runner in Games 3 and 4 against the California Angels in the 1982 ALCS, scoring each time on Brewers home runs. Then, in the fifth and final game of the series, Edwards subbed for a limping Gorman Thomas in center field in the 8th inning, and made a spectacular catch at the warning track of a deep fly ball off the bat of Don Baylor, helping preserve Milwaukee's one-run victory over the California Angels and advance the franchise to its first World Series. Edwards only appearance in the Series, which the Brewers lost in seven games to the St. Louis Cardinals, was pinch running for Thomas in Game 6.

Edwards batted .297 in 51 games for the Brewers in 1983, but he was the final cut for Milwaukee in spring training in 1984 and sent his final season in baseball playing again for Vancouver before retiring.

== Personal life and death ==
After baseball, Edwards worked in real estate and construction. He later became a minister at the World Changes International Church in College Park, Georgia.

Edwards died on April 15, 2025, at the age of 72.
