= Mark Brouhard =

American baseball player (born 1956)

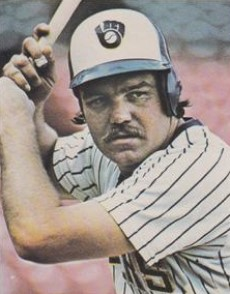
- Outfielder
- Born: May 22, 1956 (age 70); Burbank, California, U.S.
- Batted: Right Threw: Right

Professional debut
- MLB: April 12, 1980, for the Milwaukee Brewers
- NPB: April 4, 1986, for the Yakult Swallows

Last appearance
- MLB: October 6, 1985, for the Milwaukee Brewers
- NPB: April 26, 1987, for the Yakult Swallows

MLB statistics
- Batting average: .259
- Home runs: 25
- Runs batted in: 104

NPB statistics
- Batting average: .265
- Home runs: 23
- Runs batted in: 69
- Stats at Baseball Reference

Teams
- Milwaukee Brewers (1980–1985); Yakult Swallows (1986–1987)

Mark Steven Brouhard (/ˈbroʊhɑːrd/ BROH-hard; born May 22, 1956) is an American former professional baseball outfielder. He played in Major League Baseball (MLB) for six seasons, from 1980 until 1985, for the Milwaukee Brewers. Brouhard played one postseason game in his career, doing so as the starting left fielder in Game 4 of the 1982 American League Championship Series to replace Ben Oglivie, who had bruised ribs. He went 3-for-4 with a double and a home run to drive in three runs in the 9-5 win as the Brewers evened the series to force a decisive Game 5, which they eventually won to reach the World Series; Brouhard did not play in the ensuing run.

In 1986 and 1987, he played in the Nippon Professional Baseball for the Yakult Swallows.

Brouhard retired from baseball and owns a painting business in Camarillo, California.
