= Jim Evans (umpire) =

American baseball umpire (born 1946)

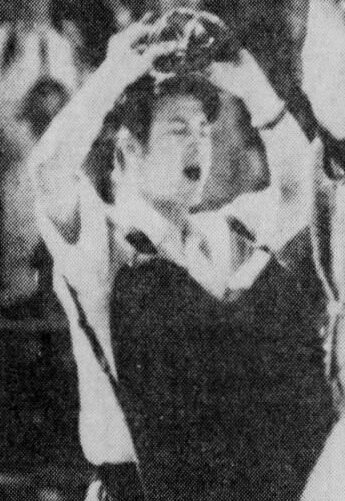
- Evans in 1975
- Born: November 5, 1946 (age 79); Longview, Texas, U.S.

MLB debut
- September 9, 1971

Last MLB appearance
- August 29, 1999

Career highlights and awards
- 3 All-Star Games (1976, 1989, 1999); 3 Division Series (1981, 1995, 1996); 7 League Championship Series (1975, 1979, 1983, 1985, 1990, 1993, 1998); 4 World Series (1977, 1982, 1986, 1996)

James Bremond Evans (born November 5, 1946) is an American former umpire in Major League Baseball (MLB) who worked in the American League (AL) from 1971 to 1999, and ran a professional umpiring school from 1990 through 2012.

== Career ==
Evans began umpiring Little League games at age 14, where his playing experience as a catcher helped in judging balls and strikes. He attended Kilgore College on scholarship before attending the University of Texas at Austin (UT). He umpired high school and college baseball while attending college. He left UT temporarily in his senior year when he was offered a job in the Florida State League, making him the last umpire hired in professional baseball who had not attended an umpire school. Following his first season in pro baseball (1968), Evans returned to UT in the fall and graduated with a Bachelor of Science in education in January 1969. A month after graduating from UT, Evans attended the newly formed MLB Umpire Development Program in February and March 1969 where he graduated first in this inaugural class. After graduation from umpire school, his minor league contract was purchased by Texas League president Bobby Bragan. Evans then worked in the Texas League (1969–70) and American Association (1971).

=== MLB umpire ===
Evans joined the AL staff in late 1971, and became an AL crew chief in 1981. Evans wore uniform number 3 starting in 1980, when the AL adopted uniform numbers.

Evans umpired in four World Series (1977, 1982, 1986 and 1996), and in seven American League Championship Series (1975, 1979, 1983, 1985, 1990, 1993 and 1998). Evans also umpired in the All-Star Game in 1976, 1989, and 1999, serving as the home plate umpire in the last two contests. He worked in the American League Division Series in 1981, 1995 (Games 3–5) and 1996, and also in the single-game playoffs to determine the AL Eastern Division champion in 1978 and the AL Western Division champion in 1995.

Evans is one of few umpires in history who have worked in two perfect games, having been the third base umpire for Mike Witt's perfect game on September 30, 1984, and the second base umpire for David Cone's perfect game on July 18, 1999. Evans was the home plate umpire both for Nolan Ryan's first no-hitter (May 15, 1973) and Don Sutton's 300th career victory (June 18, 1986).

=== Umpiring school ===
Evans operated the "Jim Evans Academy of Professional Umpiring" from 1990 through 2012; many graduates became minor league umpires, and some later became major league umpires. In early 2012, Minor League Baseball (MiLB), who would often hire Evans' graduates as the first step of a professional umpiring career, severed ties with the school. This occurred following investigation of a private bowling party for school employees, where one group selected a team name, and briefly wore costumes, in the style of the Ku Klux Klan. The school administrator was discharged for his role in the incident. Evans apologized for the incident and reached a legal settlement during mediation. Part of the settlement included Evans being hired as a special advisor on umpiring matters to the president of Minor League Baseball.

In addition to instructing in the United States, Evans has trained umpires in Austria, the Czech Republic, France, Japan, Puerto Rico, Switzerland, and the Netherlands. In 2014, he was hired as an umpire advisor by MiLB, acting as a consultant to the MiLB president.

== Personal life ==
Evans served in the Texas Air National Guard for a 6-year enlistment and was later commissioned in the US Army Reserves. He served in the Army Reserves for 8 years and was honorably discharged as a Captain.

== Works ==
- Evans, Jim (1991). Official Baseball Rules Annotated. Jim Evans Academy of Professional Umpiring. ISBN 978-0963062604.
- Luke, Bob (2005). Dean Of Umpires: A Biography Of Bill McGowan, 1896-1954. Jim Evans (foreword). McFarland & Company. ISBN 978-0786421367.

== See also ==
- List of Major League Baseball umpires (disambiguation)
