= Gordon Thomas (American football) =

American football coach

Coaching career (HC unless noted)
- 1913–1914: Tuskegee

Head coaching record
- Overall: 4–2–4

Gordon Thomas was the fourth head football coach at Tuskegee University in Tuskegee, Alabama, and he held that position for two seasons, from 1913 until 1914. His coaching record at Tuskegee was 4–2–4.
