= Randy Lerch =

American baseball player (born 1954)

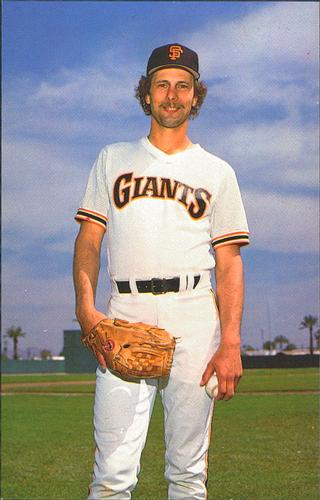
- Pitcher
- Born: October 9, 1954 (age 71); Sacramento, California, U.S.
- Batted: Left Threw: Left

MLB debut
- September 14, 1975, for the Philadelphia Phillies

Last MLB appearance
- June 22, 1986, for the Philadelphia Phillies

MLB statistics
- Win–loss record: 60–64
- Earned run average: 4.53
- Strikeouts: 507
- Stats at Baseball Reference

Teams
- Philadelphia Phillies (1975–1980); Milwaukee Brewers (1981–1982); Montreal Expos (1982–1983); San Francisco Giants (1983–1984); Philadelphia Phillies (1986)

Randy Louis Lerch (born October 9, 1954), is an American former professional baseball pitcher, who played in Major League Baseball (MLB) for the Philadelphia Phillies, Milwaukee Brewers, Montreal Expos, and San Francisco Giants, from 1975 to 1986.

== Early life ==
Lerch was born in Sacramento, California and attended Cordova High School in Rancho Cordova, California.

== Baseball career ==
Lerch was drafted by the Philadelphia Phillies in 1973 and debuted in the major leagues with the Phillies in September 1975. His first full season was 1977, and he was a mainstay in the Phillies' pitching rotation from 1977 until 1980, when he began pitching more in relief.

On September 30, 1978, Lerch hit two home runs in a 10–8 win that clinched the National League (NL) East Division championship for the Phillies.

Lerch was part of the Phillies' 1980 World Series-winning team, although he led the league in losses that season with 14 and never appeared in the World Series. During the season, Lerch fell out of favor with the team's manager, Dallas Green, and voiced an interest in being traded. As a result, Lerch was left off the Phillies' 1980 postseason roster.

Not long after the Phillies won the 1980 World Series, it was enmeshed in a scandal involving amphetamines that had been taken by several members of the team. In 1981, Lerch testified under oath that the Phillies' team physician for its Double-A affiliate in Reading, Pennsylvania had prescribed amphetamines for the organization's major league players, and that Lerch himself had received the pills.

Soon after testifying, Lerch was traded by the Phillies to the Milwaukee Brewers on March 1, 1981, for outfielder Dick Davis.

In August 1982, the Brewers sold Lerch to the Montreal Expos, who released Lerch in July 1983. He then was signed by the San Francisco Giants less than two weeks later. After the 1984 season, Lerch filed for free agency and was signed the following year by the Phillies. He pitched about a year for the Phillies before they released him in June 1986.

Lerch's career win–loss record was 60–64, with 507 strikeouts and a 4.53 earned run average (ERA).

Lerch was a better than average hitting pitcher, posting a .206 batting average (55-for-267) with 27 runs, 4 home runs, 23 RBI and 19 bases on balls. Defensively, he was better than average, recording a .966 fielding percentage which was 13 points higher than the league average at his position.

Lerch was inducted into the Reading Baseball Hall of Fame in Reading, Pennsylvania in 2000.

== Memoir ==
In 2019, Lerch published his 256-page autobiography, "God in the Bullpen," written with retired professional engineer Harold "Hal" Lerch, who despite their shared surname is no relation. The book discusses Randy Lerch's battles with drug and alcohol addiction. Columnist Barry M. Bloom called it "perhaps the greatest tell-all baseball book since the late Jim Bouton wrote Ball Four in 1970."

== Personal life ==
Lerch lives in Shingle Springs, California. He was diagnosed with cirrhosis in 2016, which was caused by alcohol addiction.
