= 1977 New York Yankees season =

Season for the Major League Baseball team the New York Yankees

1977 New York Yankees
- World Series champions American League champions American League East champions
- League: American League
- Division: East
- Ballpark: Yankee Stadium
- City: New York City
- Record: 100-62 (.617)
- Owners: George Steinbrenner
- General managers: Gabe Paul
- Managers: Billy Martin
- Television: WPIX–TV 11 (Phil Rizzuto, Frank Messer, Bill White)
- Radio: WMCA–AM 570 (Frank Messer, Phil Rizzuto, Bill White, Pam Boucher)

The 1977 New York Yankees season was the 75th season for the Yankees. The team finished with a record of 100–62 and won the World Series. The series victory was the 21st title in franchise history and the first under the ownership of George Steinbrenner. New York was managed by Billy Martin and played at Yankee Stadium in The Bronx. The season was brought to life years later in the book and drama-documentary The Bronx is Burning. The Yankees also hosted the 1977 Major League Baseball All-Star Game. To date, this is the most recent time the All-Star Game host team has won the World Series the same year.

== Offseason ==
The Yankees signed Reggie Jackson to a five-year contract, totaling $2.96 million, on November 29, 1976. Upon arriving in New York, Jackson asked for uniform number 9, which he had worn in Oakland and Baltimore. However, that number was being worn by third baseman Graig Nettles. So, noting that then-all-time home run leader Hank Aaron had just retired, Jackson asked for and received number 44, Aaron's number.

=== Notable transactions ===
- November 5, 1976: Jim Mason was drafted from the Yankees by the Toronto Blue Jays as the 30th pick in the 1976 MLB expansion draft.
- January 11, 1977: Willie McGee was drafted by the Yankees in the first round (15th pick) of the 1977 Major League Baseball draft (secondary phase) and he signed on June 6.
- January 20, 1977: Elliott Maddox and Rick Bladt were traded by the Yankees to the Baltimore Orioles for Paul Blair.
- February 17, 1977: Sandy Alomar Sr. was traded by the Yankees to the Texas Rangers for Brian Doyle, Greg Pryor and cash.
- March 26, 1977: Kerry Dineen was traded by the Yankees to the Philadelphia Phillies for Sergio Ferrer.

== Regular season ==
The team finished in first place in the American League East with a record of 100–62 (.617), 2½ games ahead of the Baltimore Orioles to successfully defend their division title. In the best-of-five League Championship Series (ALCS), they beat the Kansas City Royals in five games. In the World Series, New York defeated the Los Angeles Dodgers in six games.

=== Season standings ===
AL East
Team	W	L	Pct.	GB	Home	Road
New York Yankees	100	62	.617	—	55‍–‍26	45‍–‍36
Baltimore Orioles	97	64	.602	2½	54‍–‍27	43‍–‍37
Boston Red Sox	97	64	.602	2½	51‍–‍29	46‍–‍35
Detroit Tigers	74	88	.457	26	39‍–‍42	35‍–‍46
Cleveland Indians	71	90	.441	28½	37‍–‍44	34‍–‍46
Milwaukee Brewers	67	95	.414	33	37‍–‍44	30‍–‍51
Toronto Blue Jays	54	107	.335	45½	25‍–‍55	29‍–‍52

=== Record vs. opponents ===
1977 American League record Sources:
Team	BAL	BOS	CAL	CWS	CLE	DET	KC	MIL	MIN	NYY	OAK	SEA	TEX	TOR
Baltimore	—	6–8	5–6	5–5	11–4	12–3	4–7	11–4	6–4	8–7	8–2	7–3	4–6	10–5
Boston	8–6	—	7–3	3–7	8–7	9–6	5–5	9–6	4–6	8–7	8–3	10–1	6–4	12–3
California	6–5	3–7	—	8–7	6–4	4–6	6–9	5–5	7–8	4–7	5–10	9–6	5–10	6–4
Chicago	5–5	7–3	7–8	—	6–4	4–6	8–7	6–5	10–5	3–7	10–5	10–5	6–9	8–3
Cleveland	4–11	7–8	4–6	4–6	—	8–7	3–7	11–4	2–9	3–12	7–3	7–3	2–9	9–5
Detroit	3–12	6–9	6–4	6–4	7–8	—	3–8	10–5	5–5	6–9	5–5	5–6	2–8	10–5
Kansas City	7–4	5–5	9–6	7–8	7–3	8–3	—	8–2	10–5	5–5	9–6	11–4	8–7	8–2
Milwaukee	4–11	6–9	5–5	5–6	4–11	5–10	2–8	—	3–8	8–7	5–5	7–3	5–5	8–7
Minnesota	4–6	6–4	8–7	5–10	9–2	5–5	5–10	8–3	—	2–8	8–6	7–8	8–7	9–1
New York	7–8	7–8	7–4	7–3	12–3	9–6	5–5	7–8	8–2	—	9–2	6–4	7–3	9–6
Oakland	2–8	3–8	10–5	5–10	3–7	5–5	6–9	5–5	6–8	2–9	—	7–8	2–13	7–3
Seattle	3–7	1–10	6–9	5–10	3–7	6–5	4–11	3–7	8–7	4–6	8–7	—	9–6	4–6
Texas	6–4	4–6	10–5	9–6	9–2	8–2	7–8	5–5	7–8	3–7	13–2	6–9	—	7–4
Toronto	5–10	3–12	4–6	3–8	5–9	5–10	2–8	7–8	1–9	6–9	3–7	6–4	4–7	—

=== Notable transactions ===
- April 5: Oscar Gamble, LaMarr Hoyt, minor leaguer Bob Polinsky, and $200,000 were traded by the Yankees to the Chicago White Sox for Bucky Dent.
- April 27: Dock Ellis, Larry Murray, and Marty Perez were traded by the Yankees to the Oakland Athletics for Mike Torrez.
- August 2: The Yankees acquired Stan Thomas from the Seattle Mariners for future considerations.

==== Draft picks ====
- June 7: 1977 Major League Baseball draft
  - Joe Lefebvre was selected by the Yankees in the third round, and signed on July 6.
  - Chuck Hensley was selected by the Yankees in the tenth round.
  - Chris Welsh was selected by the Yankees in the 21st round.

=== All-Star game ===
Yankee Stadium hosted the All-Star Game on July 19, less than a week after the blackout. Four Yankees were in the game: Willie Randolph and Reggie Jackson were in the starting lineup at second base and right field, while relief pitcher Sparky Lyle and third baseman Graig Nettles were part of the roster as reserves. The National League defeated the American League 7–5.

=== Roster ===
1977 New York Yankees
Roster
Pitchers: 50 Ken Clay; 36 Dock Ellis; 31 Ed Figueroa; 35 Don Gullett; 49 Ron Guidry; 53 Ken Holtzman; 29 Catfish Hunter; 28 Sparky Lyle; 51 Larry McCall; 22 Gil Patterson; 36 Stan Thomas; 19 Dick Tidrow; 48,24 Mike Torrez	Catchers: 40 Fran Healy; 18 Elrod Hendricks; 41 Cliff Johnson; 15 Thurman Munson; Infielders: 10 Chris Chambliss; 20 Bucky Dent; 39 Mickey Klutts; 9 Graig Nettles; 27 Marty Perez; 30 Willie Randolph; 11 Fred Stanley; 25 George Zeber	Outfielders: 27,59 Dell Alston; 54 Dave Bergman; 2 Paul Blair; 44 Reggie Jackson; 46 Gene Locklear; 38 Carlos May; 14 Lou Piniella; 17 Mickey Rivers; 6 Roy White; 24 Jimmy Wynn; Other batters: 48 Dave Kingman	Manager: 1 Billy Martin; Coaches: 8 Yogi Berra; 21 Cloyd Boyer; 33 Bobby Cox; 42 Art Fowler; 32 Elston Howard; 34 Dick Howser

=== Characters ===
==== Reggie Jackson ====
Jackson's first season with the Yankees was a difficult one. Although team owner George Steinbrenner and several players, most notably catcher and team captain Thurman Munson and outfielder Lou Piniella, were excited about his arrival, Martin was not. He had managed the Detroit Tigers in 1972 when Jackson's A's beat them in the league playoffs. Jackson was once quoted as saying of Martin, "I hate him, but if I played for him, I'd probably love him."

The relationship between Jackson and his new teammates was strained due to an interview with SPORT magazine writer Robert Ward. During spring training at the Yankees' camp in Fort Lauderdale, Florida, Jackson and Ward were having drinks at a nearby bar. Jackson's version of the story is that he noted that the Yankees had won the pennant the year before, but lost the World Series to the Reds, and suggested that they needed one thing more to win it all, and pointed out the various ingredients in his drink. Ward suggested that Jackson might be "the straw that stirs the drink." But when the story appeared in the May 1977 issue of SPORT, Ward quoted Jackson as saying, "This team, it all flows from me. I'm the straw that stirs the drink. Maybe I should say me and Munson, but he can only stir it bad."

==== Thurman Munson ====
Thurman Munson was "uncharacteristically happy" about the team getting Jackson in large part because he believed he had received "a verbal agreement from Steinbrenner that, with the exception of Catfish Hunter (who'd signed a five-year, $3.75 million contract with the Yankees before the 1975 season), he [Munson] would always be the highest-paid player on the team." But, Steinbrenner did not follow through and adjust Munson's contract upward. As the baseball book Stars and Strikes: Baseball and America in the Bicentennial Summer of ‘76 puts it, "But the Yankee captain wouldn't be smiling for long, once he realized that Steinbrenner had no intention of making good on their agreement."

An article in The New York Times in January 1977 reported, "Munson, however, has continued to be disturbed with Steinbrenner because of what he said first was the owner's denial of any verbal agreement and secand [second] was Steinbrenner's misleading him on Jackson's salary."

==== Billy Martin ====
Martin feuded publicly with both Yankee owner Steinbrenner and star outfielder Jackson. In one especially infamous incident on Saturday, June 18, in the second game of a three-game sweep by the Boston Red Sox at Fenway Park, Martin pulled Jackson off the field in mid-inning for failing to hustle on a check-swing pop double by Boston's Jim Rice. Replaced in right field by Paul Blair, Jackson confronted Martin when he returned to the dugout, and Martin had to be restrained by his coaches (Elston Howard and Yogi Berra) from fighting with Jackson during the nationally televised Game of the Week.

=== In popular culture ===
Jonathan Mahler wrote a bestselling book entitled Ladies and Gentlemen, The Bronx Is Burning about the turmoil in New York City in 1977, including the Son of Sam, the blackout, and how Yankees season rallied the people of New York. The book was adapted for an ESPN miniseries, The Bronx Is Burning

The 1977 Yankees season provides a backdrop in the Spike Lee film Summer of Sam.

== Game log ==
=== Regular season ===
Legend
	Yankees win
	Yankees loss
	Postponement
	Clinched division
**Bold**	Yankees team member

1977 regular season game log: 100–62 (Home: 55–26; Away: 45–36)
April: 11–9 (Home: 5–4; Away: 6–5)

#	Date	Time (ET)	Opponent	Score	Win	Loss	Save	Time of Game	Attendance	Record	Box/ Streak
4	April 11	8:40 p.m. EST	@ Royals	4–5 (13)	Littell (1–0)	**Tidrow** (0–1)	—	3:34	39,460	1–3	L3
5	April 13	8:30 p.m. EST	@ Royals	5–3	**Guidry** (1–0)	Hassler (1–1)	—	2:58	20,089	2–3	W1
16	April 25	8:40 p.m. EDT	@ Orioles	9–6	**Tidrow** (2–1)	D. Martínez (0–1)	**Lyle** (4)	3:06	17,624	8–8	W6
17	April 26	7:31 p.m. EDT	@ Orioles	2–6	May (2–2)	**Holtzman** (1–1)	—	2:15	12,884	8–9	L1
18	April 27	7:32 p.m. EDT	@ Orioles	4–3	**Lyle** (1–1)	D. Martínez (0–2)	—	2:51	15,647	9–9	W1

May: 15–12 (Home: 8–7; Away: 4–8)

#	Date	Time (ET)	Opponent	Score	Win	Loss	Save	Time of Game	Attendance	Record	Box/ Streak
34	May 19	8:00 p.m. EDT	Orioles	9–1	**Figueroa** (5–2)	Flanagan (1–2)	—	2:09	15,909	20–14	W2
35	May 20	8:00 p.m. EDT	Orioles	5–6	D. Martínez (2–2)	**Tidrow** (2–2)	—	3:01	25,872	20–15	L1
36	May 21	2:00 p.m. EDT	Orioles	3–4 (12)	T. Martinez (1–0)	**Lyle** (2–2)	—	3:12	19,968	20–16	L2
37 (1)	May 22	1:00 p.m. EDT	Orioles	1–5	May (5–4)	**Hunter** (1–3)	—	2:23	—	20–17	L3
38 (2)	May 22	3:48 p.m. EDT	Orioles	8–2	**Guidry** (3–0)	McGregor (1–1)	—	2:19	43,285	21–17	W1
39	May 23		Red Sox								
40	May 24		Red Sox								
41 (1)	May 25	5:30 p.m. EDT	Rangers	**W** 3–2	**Patterson** (1–1)	Blyleven (4–5)	**Lyle** (7)	2:35	—	23–18	W2
42 (2)	May 25	8:30 p.m. EDT	Rangers	L 0–1	Perry (4–4)	**Torrez** (5–3)	—	2:23	19,693	23–19	L1
43	May 27		White Sox								
44	May 28		White Sox								
45	May 29		White Sox								
46	May 30		@ Red Sox								
47	May 31		@ Red Sox								

June: 16–12 (Home: 7–2; Away: 9–10)

#	Date	Time (ET)	Opponent	Score	Win	Loss	Save	Time of Game	Attendance	Record	Box/ Streak
50	June 3		@ White Sox								
51	June 4		@ White Sox								
52	June 5		@ White Sox								
53	June 6	8:40 p.m. EDT	@ Rangers	**W** 9–2	**Hunter** (2–3)	Alexander (6–3)	—	2:24	21,978	30–23	W3
54	June 7	8:35 p.m. EDT	@ Rangers	L 3–7	Lindblad (2–3)	**Figueroa** (7–4)	—	2:40	18,075	30–24	L1
60	June 13	8:00 p.m. EDT	Royals	3–8	Splittorff (5–4)	**Torrez** (7–5)	Mingori (2)	2:25	22,420	34–26	L2
61	June 14	8:00 p.m. EDT	Royals	4–2	**Gullett** (6–2)	Hassler (3–2)	—	2:19	19,559	35–26	W1
62	June 16	8:00 p.m. EDT	Royals	7–0	**Guidry** (5–2)	Leonard (4–7)	—	2:02	26,391	36–26	W2
63	June 17		@ Red Sox								
64	June 18		@ Red Sox								
65	June 19		@ Red Sox								
69	June 24		Red Sox								
70	June 25		Red Sox								
71	June 26		Red Sox								

July: 16–12 (Home: 10–5; Away: 6–7)

#	Date	Time (ET)	Opponent	Score	Win	Loss	Save	Time of Game	Attendance	Record	Box/ Streak
83	July 8	7:37 p.m. EDT	@ Orioles	7–5	**Gullett** (7–3)	May (10–8)	**Lyle** (14)	2:52	33,738	48–35	W4
84	July 9	7:38 p.m. EDT	@ Orioles	5–6	T. Martinez (2–0)	**Lyle** (7–3)	Drago (4)	2:34	44,193	48–36	L1
85	July 10	2:11 p.m. EDT	@ Orioles	0–6	Grimsley (8–4)	**Figueroa** (8–7)	—	2:12	34,299	48–37	L2
86	July 11	8:39 p.m. EDT	@ Orioles	3–4	Flanagan (6–8)	**Torrez** (8–8)	—	2:56	42,603	48–38	L3
90	July 15	8:30 p.m. EDT	@ Royals	4–7	Splittorff (7–5)	**Guidry** (6–5)	Mingori (3)	2:26	36,743	50–40	L1
91	July 16	8:30 p.m. EDT	@ Royals	1–5	Leonard (9–9)	**Torrez** (8–9)	—	2:20	40,054	50–41	L2
92	July 17	2:30 p.m. EDT	@ Royals	4–8	Hassler (6–2)	**Clay** (0–1)	—	2:51	38,699	50–42	L3
ASG	July 19	8:15 p.m. EDT	48th All-Star Game in Bronx, NY; NL @ AL	5–7	–	–	–	2:34	56,683	–	ASG
97	July 24	2:00 p.m. EDT	Royals	3–1	**Gullett** (9–3)	Hassler (6–3)	**Tidrow** (4)	2:30	41,060	53–44	W2
—	July 25	8:00 p.m. EDT	Royals	**Postponed (Rain)** (Makeup date: August 29)							
98	July 26	8:00 p.m. EDT	Orioles	5–4 (10)	**Lyle** (8–3)	McGregor (1–2)	—	2:48	32,097	54–44	W3
99	July 27	8:00 p.m. EDT	Orioles	4–6	Palmer (12–8)	**Hunter** (6–5)	T. Martinez (5)	3:15	47,271	54–45	L1
100	July 28	2:00 p.m. EDT	Orioles	14–2	**Torrez** (9–10)	May (11–9)	—	2:40	40,818	55–45	W1

August: 22–9 (Home: 12–2; Away: 10–7)

#	Date	Time (ET)	Opponent	Score	Win	Loss	Save	Time of Game	Attendance	Record	Box/ Streak
116	August 15		White Sox								
117	August 16		White Sox								
120	August 19	8:35 p.m. EDT	@ Rangers	**W** 8–1	**Torrez** (14–10)	Moret (2–1)	—	2:15	31,159	70–50	W6
121	August 20	8:35 p.m. EDT	@ Rangers	**W** 6–2	**Tidrow** (8–4)	Perry (10–10)	**Lyle** (19)	2:35	34,004	71–50	W7
122	August 21	8:35 p.m. EDT	@ Rangers	**W** 2–1	**Guidry** (10–6)	Alexander (13–8)	**Lyle** (20)	2:26	27,004	72–50	W8
123	August 22		@ White Sox								
124	August 23		@ White Sox								
127	August 26	8:00 p.m. EDT	Rangers	**W** 6–5	**Clay** (2–3)	Moret (2–2)	**Lyle** (21)	2:38	29,000	76–51	W4
128	August 27	2:00 p.m. EDT	Rangers	L 2–8	Blyleven (12–11)	**Torrez** (15–11)	—	2:37	33,179	76–51	L1
129	August 28	2:00 p.m. EDT	Rangers	**W** 1–0	**Guidry** (11–6)	Ellis (7–11)	—	2:37	37,714	77–51	W1
130	August 29	2:00 p.m. EDT	Royals	5–3	**Lyle** (10–4)	Mingori (1–4)	—	2:29	31,269	78–52	W2

September: 19–9 (Home: 7–4; Away: 12–5)

#	Date	Time (ET)	Opponent	Score	Win	Loss	Save	Time of Game	Attendance	Record	Box/ Streak
145	September 13		Red Sox								
146	September 14		Red Sox								
147	September 15		Red Sox								
151	September 19		@ Red Sox								
—	September 20	7:30 p.m. EDT	@ Red Sox	**Postponed (Rain)** (Makeup date: September 21)							
152	September 21		@ Red Sox								

October: 1–1 (Home: 1–1; Away: 0–0)

#	Date	Time (ET)	Opponent	Score	Win	Loss	Save	Time of Game	Attendance	Record	Box/ Streak

=== Detailed records ===
American League
Opponent	Home	Away	Total	Pct.	Runs scored	Runs allowed
AL East
Baltimore Orioles	4–4	3–4	7–8	0.467	79	66
Boston Red Sox	6–2	1–6	7–8	0.467	54	76
**New York Yankees**	—	—	—	—	—	—
Div Total	10–6	4–10	14–16	0.467	133	142
AL West
Chicago White Sox	4–1	3–2	7–3	0.700	66	58
Kansas City Royals	4–1	1–4	5–5	0.500	40	42
Texas Rangers	3–2	4–1	7–3	0.700	40	29
Div Total	11–4	8–7	19–11	0.633	146	129
Season Total	21–10	12–17	33–27	0.550	279	271

Month	Games	Won	Lost	Win %	RS	RA
Total

	Games	Won	Lost	Win %	RS	RA
Home
Away
Total

=== Composite Box ===
1977 New York Yankees Inning–by–Inning Boxscore
Team	1	2	3	4	5	6	7	8	9	10	11	12	13	14	15	R	H	E
Opponents
Yankees

=== Postseason Game log ===
Legend
	Yankees win
	Yankees loss
**Bold**	Yankees team member

1977 Postseason game log: 7–4 (Home: 3–2; Away: 4–2)
AL Championship Series vs. Kansas City Royals 3–2 (Home: 1–1; Away: 2–1)

#	Date	Time (ET)	Opponent	Score	Win	Loss	Save	Time of Game	Attendance	Series	Box/ Streak
1	October 5	3:20 p.m. EDT	Royals	2–7	Splittorff (1–0)	**Gullett** (0–1)	—	2:40	54,930	KC 1–0	L1
2	October 6	8:19 p.m. EDT	Royals	6–2	**Guidry** (1–0)	Hassler (0–1)	—	2:58	56,230	TIE 1–1	W1
3	October 7	8:15 p.m. EDT	@ Royals	2–6	Leonard (1–0)	**Torrez** (0–1)	—	2:19	41,285	KC 2–1	L1
4	October 8	1:15 p.m. EDT	@ Royals	6–4	**Lyle** (1–0)	Gura (0–1)	—	3:08	41,135	TIE 2–2	W1
5	October 9	8:15 p.m. EDT	@ Royals	5–3	**Lyle** (2–0)	Leonard (1–1)	—	3:04	41,133	NYY 3–2	W2

World Series: vs. Los Angeles Dodgers 4–2 (Home: 2–1; Away: 2–1)

#	Date	Time (ET)	Opponent	Score	Win	Loss	Save	Time of Game	Attendance	Series	Box/ Streak
1	October 11	8:15 p.m. EDT	Dodgers	4–3 (12)	**Lyle** (1–0)	Rhoden (0–1)	—	56,668	3:24	NYA 1–0	W1
2	October 12	8:15 p.m. EDT	Dodgers	1–6	Hooton (1–0)	**Hunter** (0–1)	—	56,691	2:27	Tied 1–1	L1
3	October 14	8:15 p.m. EDT	@ Dodgers	5–3	**Torrez** (1–0)	John (0–1)	—	55,992	2:31	NYA 2–1	W1
4	October 15	4:15 p.m. EDT	@ Dodgers	4–2	**Guidry** (1–0)	Rau (0–1)	—	55,995	2:07	NYA 3–1	W2
5	October 16	4:15 p.m. EDT	@ Dodgers	4–10	Sutton (1–0)	**Gullett** (0–1)	—	55,995	2:29	NYA 3–2	L1
6	October 18	8:15 p.m. EDT	Dodgers	8–4	**Torrez** (2–0)	Hooton (1–1)	—	56,407	2:18	NYA 4–2	W1

== Starting Lineups ==
=== Regular Season ===
==== Batting Order ====
1977 Regular Season Batting Order game log
April

#	Date	Opponent	1st	2nd	3rd	4th	5th	6th	7th	8th	9th
4	April 11	@ KC	#17; Rivers (CF)	#6; White (LF)	#15; Munson (C)	#24; Wynn (DH)	#10; Chambliss (1B)	#44; Jackson (RF)	#9; Nettles (3B)	#30; Randolph (2B)	#20; Dent (SS)
5	April 13	@ KC	#17; Rivers (CF)	#15; Munson (C)	#44; Jackson (RF)	#24; Wynn (DH)	#10; Chambliss (1B)	#6; White (LF)	#9; Nettles (3B)	#30; Randolph (2B)	#20; Dent (SS)
16	April 25	@ BAL	#30; Randolph (2B)	#15; Munson (C)	#44; Jackson (RF)	#9; Nettles (3B)	#17; Rivers (CF)	#24; Wynn (DH)	#6; White (LF)	#10; Chambliss (1B)	#20; Dent (SS)
17	April 26	@ BAL									
18	April 27	@ BAL									

May

#	Date	Opponent	1st	2nd	3rd	4th	5th	6th	7th	8th	9th
34	May 19	BAL									
35	May 20	BAL									
36	May 21	BAL									
37	May 22	BAL									
38	May 22	BAL									

June

#	Date	Opponent	1st	2nd	3rd	4th	5th	6th	7th	8th	9th
60	June 13	KC	#30; Randolph (2B)	#17; Rivers (CF)	#15; Munson (C)	#10; Chambliss (1B)	#6; White (LF)	#14; Piniella (DH)	#9; Nettles (3B)	#2; Blair (RF)	#20; Dent (SS)
61	June 14	KC	#30; Randolph (2B)	#17; Rivers (CF)	#15; Munson (C)	#10; Chambliss (1B)	#6; White (LF)	#14; Piniella (DH)	#2; Blair (RF)	#25; Zeber (3B)	#20; Dent (SS)
62	June 16	KC	#17; Rivers (CF)	#30; Randolph (2B)	#15; Munson (C)	#10; Chambliss (1B)	#44; Jackson (RF)	#6; White (LF)	#9; Nettles (3B)	#38; May (DH)	#20; Dent (SS)

July

#	Date	Opponent	1st	2nd	3rd	4th	5th	6th	7th	8th	9th
83	July 8	@ BAL									
84	July 9	@ BAL									
85	July 10	@ BAL									
86	July 11	@ BAL									
90	July 15	@ KC	#17; Rivers (CF)	#6; White (DH)	#15; Munson (C)	#14; Piniella (LF)	#10; Chambliss (1B)	#44; Jackson (RF)	#30; Randolph (2B)	#9; Nettles (3B)	#20; Dent (SS)
91	July 16	@ KC	#17; Rivers (CF)	#6; White (LF)	#15; Munson (C)	#44; Jackson (RF)	#10; Chambliss (1B)	#9; Nettles (3B)	#30; Randolph (2B)	#27; Alston (DH)	#20; Dent (SS)
92	July 17	@ KC	#30; Randolph (2B)	#17; Rivers (CF)	#41; Johnson (DH)	#10; Chambliss (1B)	#14; Piniella (LF)	#44; Jackson (RF)	#9; Nettles (3B)	#40; Healy (C)	#20; Dent (SS)
97	July 24	KC	#30; Randolph (2B)	#6; White (LF)	#15; Munson (C)	#10; Chambliss (1B)	#14; Piniella (RF)	#44; Jackson (DH)	#9; Nettles (3B)	#2; Blair (CF)	#20; Dent (SS)
98	July 26	BAL									
99	July 27	BAL									
100	July 28	BAL									

August

#	Date	Opponent	1st	2nd	3rd	4th	5th	6th	7th	8th	9th
130	August 29	KC	#17; Rivers (CF)	#9; Nettles (3B)	#15; Munson (C)	#44; Jackson (RF)	#14; Piniella (DH)	#41; Johnson (1B)	#6; White (LF)	#30; Randolph (2B)	#20; Dent (SS)

September

#	Date	Opponent	1st	2nd	3rd	4th	5th	6th	7th	8th	9th

October

#	Date	Opponent	1st	2nd	3rd	4th	5th	6th	7th	8th	9th

==== Defensive Lineup ====
1977 Regular Season Defensive Lineup game log
April

#	Date	Opponent	C	1B	2B	3B	SS	LF	CF	RF	P
4	April 11	@ KC	#15; Munson	#10; Chambliss	#30; Randolph	#9; Nettles	#20; Dent	#6; White	#17; Rivers	#44; Jackson	#36; Ellis
5	April 13	@ KC	#15; Munson	#10; Chambliss	#30; Randolph	#9; Nettles	#20; Dent	#6; White	#17; Rivers	#44; Jackson	#31; Figueroa
16	April 25	@ BAL	#15; Munson	#10; Chambliss	#30; Randolph	#9; Nettles	#20; Dent	#6; White	#17; Rivers	#44; Jackson	#35; Gullett
17	April 26	@ BAL									#53; Holtzman
18	April 27	@ BAL									#22; Patterson

May

#	Date	Opponent	C	1B	2B	3B	SS	LF	CF	RF	P
34	May 19	BAL									
35	May 20	BAL									#35; Gullett
36	May 21	BAL									
37	May 22	BAL									
38	May 22	BAL									

June

#	Date	Opponent	C	1B	2B	3B	SS	LF	CF	RF	P
60	June 13	KC	#15; Munson	#10; Chambliss	#30; Randolph	#9; Nettles	#20; Dent	#6; White	#17; Rivers	#2; Blair	#24; Torrez
61	June 14	KC	#15; Munson	#10; Chambliss	#30; Randolph	#25; Zeber	#20; Dent	#6; White	#17; Rivers	#2; Blair	#35; Gullett
62	June 16	KC	#15; Munson	#10; Chambliss	#30; Randolph	#9; Nettles	#20; Dent	#6; White	#17; Rivers	#44; Jackson	#49; Guidry

July

#	Date	Opponent	C	1B	2B	3B	SS	LF	CF	RF	P
83	July 8	@ BAL									#35; Gullett
84	July 9	@ BAL									
85	July 10	@ BAL									
86	July 11	@ BAL									
90	July 15	@ KC	#15; Munson	#10; Chambliss	#30; Randolph	#9; Nettles	#20; Dent	#14; Piniella	#17; Rivers	#44; Jackson	#49; Guidry
91	July 16	@ KC	#15; Munson	#10; Chambliss	#30; Randolph	#9; Nettles	#20; Dent	#6; White	#17; Rivers	#44; Jackson	#24; Torrez
92	July 17	@ KC	#40; Healy	#10; Chambliss	#30; Randolph	#9; Nettles	#20; Dent	#14; Piniella	#17; Rivers	#44; Jackson	#50; Clay
97	July 24	KC	#15; Munson	#10; Chambliss	#30; Randolph	#9; Nettles	#20; Dent	#6; White	#2; Blair	#14; Piniella	#35; Gullett
98	July 26	BAL									
99	July 27	BAL									
100	July 28	BAL									

August

#	Date	Opponent	C	1B	2B	3B	SS	LF	CF	RF	P
130	August 29	KC	#15; Munson	#41; Johnson	#30; Randolph	#9; Nettles	#20; Dent	#6; White	#17; Rivers	#44; Jackson	#29; Hunter

September

#	Date	Opponent	C	1B	2B	3B	SS	LF	CF	RF	P

October

#	Date	Opponent	C	1B	2B	3B	SS	LF	CF	RF	P

=== Postseason ===
==== Batting Order ====
1977 Postseason Batting Order game log
AL Championship Series: vs. Kansas City Royals

#	Date	Opponent	1st	2nd	3rd	4th	5th	6th	7th	8th	9th
1	October 5	KC	#17; Rivers (CF)	#9; Nettles (3B)	#15; Munson (C)	#44; Jackson (RF)	#14; Piniella (LF)	#10; Chambliss (1B)	#41; Johnson (DH)	#30; Randolph (2B)	#20; Dent (SS)
2	October 6	KC	#17; Rivers (CF)	#9; Nettles (3B)	#15; Munson (C)	#44; Jackson (RF)	#14; Piniella (LF)	#41; Johnson (DH)	#10; Chambliss (1B)	#30; Randolph (2B)	#20; Dent (SS)
3	October 7	@ KC	#17; Rivers (CF)	#6; White (LF)	#15; Munson (C)	#44; Jackson (RF)	#10; Chambliss (1B)	#9; Nettles (3B)	#14; Piniella (DH)	#30; Randolph (2B)	#20; Dent (SS)
4	October 8	@ KC	#17; Rivers (CF)	#9; Nettles (3B)	#15; Munson (C)	#44; Jackson (RF)	#14; Piniella (LF)	#41; Johnson (DH)	#10; Chambliss (1B)	#30; Randolph (2B)	#20; Dent (SS)
5	October 9	@ KC	#17; Rivers (CF)	#30; Randolph (2B)	#15; Munson (C)	#14; Piniella (LF)	#41; Johnson (DH)	#9; Nettles (3B)	#10; Chambliss (1B)	#2; Blair (RF)	#20; Dent (SS)

World Series: vs. Los Angeles Dodgers

#	Date	Opponent	1st	2nd	3rd	4th	5th	6th	7th	8th	9th
1	October 11	LA	#17; Rivers (CF)	#30; Randolph (2B)	#15; Munson (C)	#44; Jackson (RF)	#10; Chambliss (1B)	#9; Nettles (3B)	#14; Piniella (LF)	#20; Dent (SS)	#35; Gullett (SP)
2	October 12	LA	#17; Rivers (CF)	#30; Randolph (2B)	#15; Munson (C)	#44; Jackson (RF)	#10; Chambliss (1B)	#9; Nettles (3B)	#14; Piniella (LF)	#20; Dent (SS)	#29; Hunter (SP)
3	October 14	@ LA	#17; Rivers (CF)	#30; Randolph (2B)	#15; Munson (C)	#44; Jackson (RF)	#10; Chambliss (1B)	#9; Nettles (3B)	#14; Piniella (LF)	#20; Dent (SS)	#24; Torrez (SP)
4	October 15	@ LA	#17; Rivers (CF)	#30; Randolph (2B)	#15; Munson (C)	#44; Jackson (RF)	#10; Chambliss (1B)	#9; Nettles (3B)	#14; Piniella (LF)	#20; Dent (SS)	#49; Guidry (SP)
5	October 16	@ LA	#17; Rivers (CF)	#30; Randolph (2B)	#15; Munson (C)	#44; Jackson (RF)	#10; Chambliss (1B)	#9; Nettles (3B)	#14; Piniella (LF)	#20; Dent (SS)	#35; Gullett (SP)
6	October 18	LA	#17; Rivers (CF)	#30; Randolph (2B)	#15; Munson (C)	#44; Jackson (RF)	#10; Chambliss (1B)	#9; Nettles (3B)	#14; Piniella (LF)	#20; Dent (SS)	#24; Torrez (SP)

==== Defensive Lineup ====
1977 Postseason Defensive Lineup game log
AL Championship Series: vs. Kansas City Royals

#	Date	Opponent	C	1B	2B	3B	SS	LF	CF	RF	P
1	October 5	KC	#15; Munson	#10; Chambliss	#30; Randolph	#9; Nettles	#20; Dent	#14; Piniella	#17; Rivers	#44; Jackson	#35; Gullett
2	October 6	KC	#15; Munson	#10; Chambliss	#30; Randolph	#9; Nettles	#20; Dent	#14; Piniella	#17; Rivers	#44; Jackson	#49; Guidry
3	October 7	@ KC	#15; Munson	#10; Chambliss	#30; Randolph	#9; Nettles	#20; Dent	#6; White	#17; Rivers	#44; Jackson	#24; Torrez
4	October 8	@ KC	#15; Munson	#10; Chambliss	#30; Randolph	#9; Nettles	#20; Dent	#14; Piniella	#17; Rivers	#44; Jackson	#31; Figueroa
5	October 9	@ KC	#15; Munson	#10; Chambliss	#30; Randolph	#9; Nettles	#20; Dent	#14; Piniella	#17; Rivers	#2; Blair	#49; Guidry

World Series: vs. Los Angeles Dodgers

#	Date	Opponent	C	1B	2B	3B	SS	LF	CF	RF	P
1	October 11	LA	#15; Munson	#10; Chambliss	#30; Randolph	#9; Nettles	#20; Dent	#14; Piniella	#17; Rivers	#44; Jackson	#35; Gullett
2	October 12	LA	#15; Munson	#10; Chambliss	#30; Randolph	#9; Nettles	#20; Dent	#14; Piniella	#17; Rivers	#44; Jackson	#29; Hunter
3	October 14	@ LA	#15; Munson	#10; Chambliss	#30; Randolph	#9; Nettles	#20; Dent	#14; Piniella	#17; Rivers	#44; Jackson	#24; Torrez
4	October 15	@ LA	#15; Munson	#10; Chambliss	#30; Randolph	#9; Nettles	#20; Dent	#14; Piniella	#17; Rivers	#44; Jackson	#49; Guidry
5	October 16	@ LA	#15; Munson	#10; Chambliss	#30; Randolph	#9; Nettles	#20; Dent	#14; Piniella	#17; Rivers	#44; Jackson	#35; Gullett
6	October 18	LA	#15; Munson	#10; Chambliss	#30; Randolph	#9; Nettles	#20; Dent	#14; Piniella	#17; Rivers	#44; Jackson	#24; Torrez

== Game Umpires ==
=== Regular Season ===
1977 Regular Season Umpire game log
April

#	Date	Opponent	HP	1B	2B	3B
4	April 11	@ KC	Al Clark	Jerry Neudecker (crew chief)	Art Frantz	Nick Bremigan
5	April 13	@ KC	Jerry Neudecker (crew chief)	Art Frantz	Nick Bremigan	Al Clark
16	April 25	@ BAL	Lou DiMuro (crew chief)	Bill Deegan	Jim McKean	Dale Ford
17	April 26	@ BAL	Bill Deegan	Jim McKean	Dale Ford	Lou DiMuro (crew chief)
18	April 27	@ BAL	Jim McKean	Dale Ford	Lou DiMuro (crew chief)	Bill Deegan

May

#	Date	Opponent	HP	1B	2B	3B
34	May 19	BAL	Russ Goetz (crew chief)	George Maloney	Terry Cooney	Greg Kosc
35	May 20	BAL	George Maloney	Terry Cooney	Greg Kosc	Russ Goetz (crew chief)
36	May 21	BAL	Terry Cooney	Greg Kosc	Russ Goetz (crew chief)	George Maloney
37	May 22	BAL	Greg Kosc	Russ Goetz (crew chief)	George Maloney	Terry Cooney
38	May 22	BAL	Russ Goetz (crew chief)	George Maloney	Terry Cooney	Greg Kosc

June

#	Date	Opponent	HP	1B	2B	3B
60	June 13	KC	Bill Haller (crew chief)	Ron Luciano	Bill Kunkel	Ken Kaiser
61	June 14	KC	Ron Luciano	Bill Kunkel	Ken Kaiser	Bill Haller (crew chief)
62	June 16	KC	Bill Kunkel	Ken Kaiser	Bill Haller (crew chief)	Ron Luciano

July

#	Date	Opponent	HP	1B	2B	3B
83	July 8	@ BAL	Russ Goetz (crew chief)	George Maloney	Terry Cooney	Greg Kosc
84	July 9	@ BAL	George Maloney	Terry Cooney	Greg Kosc	Russ Goetz (crew chief)
85	July 10	@ BAL	Terry Cooney	Greg Kosc	Russ Goetz (crew chief)	George Maloney
86	July 11	@ BAL	Greg Kosc	Russ Goetz (crew chief)	George Maloney	Jim McKean
90	July 15	@ KC	Vic Voltaggio	Marty Springstead (crew chief)	Larry Barnett	Jim Evans
91	July 16	@ KC	Marty Springstead (crew chief)	Larry Barnett	Jim Evans	Vic Voltaggio
92	July 17	@ KC	Larry Barnett	Jim Evans	Vic Voltaggio	Marty Springstead (crew chief)
97	July 24	KC	Steve Palermo	Joe Brinkman	Rich Garcia	Nestor Chylak (crew chief)
98	July 26	BAL	Ted Hendry	Jerry Neudecker (crew chief)	Art Frantz	Al Clark
99	July 27	BAL	Jerry Neudecker (crew chief)|	Art Frantz	Al Clark	Ted Hendry
100	July 28	BAL	Art Frantz	Al Clark	Ted Hendry	Jerry Neudecker (crew chief)

August

#	Date	Opponent	HP	1B	2B	3B
130	August 29	KC	Lou DiMuro (crew chief)	Jim McKean	Bill Deegan	Fred Spenn

September

#	Date	Opponent	HP	1B	2B	3B

October

#	Date	Opponent	HP	1B	2B	3B

=== Postseason ===
1977 Postseason Umpire game log
AL Championship Series: vs. Kansas City Royals

#	Date	Opponent	HP	1B	2B	3B	LF	RF
1	October 5	KC	Jerry Neudecker (crew chief)	Russ Goetz	Jim McKean	Marty Springstead	Nick Bremigan	Bill Deegan
2	October 6	KC	Russ Goetz	Jim McKean	Marty Springstead	Nick Bremigan	Bill Deegan	Jerry Neudecker (crew chief)
3	October 7	@ KC	Jim McKean	Marty Springstead	Nick Bremigan	Bill Deegan	Jerry Neudecker (crew chief)	Russ Goetz
4	October 8	@ KC	Marty Springstead	Nick Bremigan	Bill Deegan	Jerry Neudecker (crew chief)	Russ Goetz	Jim McKean
5	October 9	@ KC	Nick Bremigan	Bill Deegan	Jerry Neudecker (crew chief)	Marty Springstead	Russ Goetz	Jim McKean

World Series: vs. Los Angeles Dodgers

#	Date	Opponent	HP	1B	2B	3B	LF	RF
1	October 11	LA	Nestor Chylak (AL) (crew chief)	#16; Ed Sudol (NL)	Larry McCoy (AL)	#2; Jerry Dale (NL)	Jim Evans (AL)	#9; John McSherry (NL)
2	October 12	LA	#16; Ed Sudol (NL)	Larry McCoy (AL)	#2; Jerry Dale (NL)	Jim Evans (AL)	#9; John McSherry (NL)	Nestor Chylak (AL) (crew chief)
3	October 14	@ LA	Larry McCoy (AL)	#2; Jerry Dale (NL)	Jim Evans (AL)	#9; John McSherry (NL)	Nestor Chylak (AL) (crew chief)	#16; Ed Sudol (NL)
4	October 15	@ LA	#2; Jerry Dale (NL)	Jim Evans (AL)	#9; John McSherry (NL)	Nestor Chylak (AL) (crew chief)	#16; Ed Sudol (NL)	Larry McCoy (AL)
5	October 16	@ LA	Jim Evans (AL)	#9; John McSherry (NL)	Nestor Chylak (AL) (crew chief)	#16; Ed Sudol (NL)	Larry McCoy (AL)	#2; Jerry Dale (NL)
6	October 18	LA	#9; John McSherry (NL)	Nestor Chylak (AL) (crew chief)	#16; Ed Sudol (NL)	Larry McCoy (AL)	#2; Jerry Dale (NL)	Jim Evans (AL)

== Player stats ==
= Indicates team leader

=== Batting ===
==== Starters by position ====
Note: Pos = Position; G = Games played; AB = At bats; H = Hits; Avg. = Batting average; HR = Home runs; RBI = Runs batted in

Pos	Player	G	AB	H	Avg.	HR	RBI
C	Thurman Munson	149	595	183	.308	18	100
1B	Chris Chambliss	157	600	172	.287	17	90
2B	Willie Randolph	147	551	151	.274	5	40
3B	Graig Nettles	158	589	150	.255	37	107
SS	Bucky Dent	158	477	118	.247	8	49
LF	Roy White	143	519	139	.268	14	52
CF	Mickey Rivers	138	565	184	.326	12	69
RF	Reggie Jackson	146	525	150	.286	32	110
DH	Carlos May	65	181	41	.227	2	16

==== Other batters ====
Note: G = Games played; AB = At bats; H = Hits; Avg. = Batting average; HR = Home runs; RBI = Runs batted in

Player	G	AB	H	Avg.	HR	RBI
Lou Piniella	103	339	112	.330	12	45
Paul Blair	83	164	43	.262	4	25
Cliff Johnson	56	142	42	.296	12	31
Jimmy Wynn	30	77	11	.143	1	3
Fran Healy	28	67	15	.224	0	7
George Zeber	25	65	21	.323	3	10
Fred Stanley	48	46	12	.261	1	7
Dell Alston	22	40	13	.325	1	4
Dave Kingman	8	24	6	.250	4	7
Mickey Klutts	5	15	4	.267	1	4
Elrod Hendricks	10	11	3	.273	1	5
Gene Locklear	1	5	3	.600	0	2
Dave Bergman	5	4	1	.250	0	1
Marty Perez	1	4	2	.500	0	0

=== Pitching ===
==== Starting pitchers ====
Note: G = Games pitched; IP = Innings pitched; W = Wins; L = Losses; ERA = Earned run average; SO = Strikeouts

Player	G	IP	W	L	ERA	SO
Ed Figueroa	32	239.1	16	11	3.57	104
Mike Torrez	31	217.0	14	12	3.82	90
Ron Guidry	31	210.2	16	7	2.82	176
Don Gullett	22	158.1	14	4	3.58	116
Catfish Hunter	22	143.1	9	9	4.71	52
Dock Ellis	3	19.2	1	1	1.83	5

==== Other pitchers ====
Note: G = Games pitched; IP = Innings pitched; W = Wins; L = Losses; ERA = Earned run average; SO = Strikeouts

Player	G	IP	W	L	ERA	SO
Ken Holtzman	18	71.2	2	3	5.78	14
Gil Patterson	10	33.1	1	2	5.40	29

==== Relief pitchers ====
Note: G = Games pitched; IP = Innings pitched; W = Wins; L = Losses; SV = Saves; ERA = Earned run average; SO = Strikeouts

Player	G	IP	W	L	SV	ERA	SO
Sparky Lyle	72	137.0	13	5	26	2.17	68
Dick Tidrow	49	151.0	11	4	5	3.16	83
Ken Clay	21	55.2	2	3	1	4.37	20
Stan Thomas	3	6.1	1	0	0	7.11	1
Larry McCall	2	6.0	0	1	0	7.50	0

== ALCS ==
=== Game 1 ===
October 5: Yankee Stadium, New York City

Team	1	2	3	4	5	6	7	8	9	R	H	E
Kansas City	2	2	2	0	0	0	0	1	0	7	9	0
New York	0	0	2	0	0	0	0	0	0	2	9	0
W: Paul Splittorff (1–0) L: Don Gullett (0–1)
HRs: KC – Hal McRae (1), John Mayberry (1), Al Cowens (1) NYY – Thurman Munson (1)

=== Game 2 ===
October 6: Yankee Stadium, New York City

Team	1	2	3	4	5	6	7	8	9	R	H	E
Kansas City	0	0	1	0	0	1	0	0	0	2	3	1
New York	0	0	0	0	2	3	0	1	-	6	10	0
W: Ron Guidry (1–0) L: Andy Hassler (0–1)
HRs: KC – none; NYY – Cliff Johnson (1)

=== Game 3 ===
October 7: Royals Stadium, Kansas City, Missouri

Team	1	2	3	4	5	6	7	8	9	R	H	E
New York	0	0	0	0	1	0	0	0	1	2	4	1
Kansas City	0	1	1	0	1	2	0	1	-	6	12	1
W: Dennis Leonard (1–0) L: Mike Torrez (0–1)
HRs: NYY – none; KC – none

=== Game 4 ===
October 8: Royals Stadium, Kansas City, Missouri

Team	1	2	3	4	5	6	7	8	9	R	H	E
New York	1	2	1	1	0	0	0	0	1	6	13	0
Kansas City	0	0	2	2	0	0	0	0	0	4	8	2
W: Sparky Lyle (1–0) L: Larry Gura (0–1)
HRs: Yanks – none; KC – none

=== Game 5 ===
October 9: Royals Stadium, Kansas City, Missouri

Team	1	2	3	4	5	6	7	8	9	R	H	E
New York	0	0	1	0	0	0	0	1	3	5	10	0
Kansas City	2	0	1	0	0	0	0	0	0	3	10	1
W: Sparky Lyle (2–0) L: Dennis Leonard (1–1)
HRs: NYY – none; KC – none

== World Series ==
AL New York Yankees (4) vs. NL Los Angeles Dodgers (2)
Game	Score	Date	Location	Attendance	Time of Game
1	Dodgers – 3, Yankees – 4 (12 inns)	October 11	Yankee Stadium	56,668	3:24
2	Dodgers – 6, Yankees – 1	October 12	Yankee Stadium	56,691	2:27
3	Yankees – 5, Dodgers – 3	October 14	Dodger Stadium	55,992	2:31
4	Yankees – 4, Dodgers – 2	October 15	Dodger Stadium	55,995	2:07
5	Yankees – 4, Dodgers – 10	October 16	Dodger Stadium	55,995	2:29
6	Dodgers – 4, Yankees – 8	October 18	Yankee Stadium	56,407	2:18

== Awards and honors ==
- Reggie Jackson, Babe Ruth Award
- Reggie Jackson, World Series MVP
- Sparky Lyle, Cy Young Award
- Graig Nettles, Gold Glove, third base

=== All-Stars ===
All-Star Game

- Jackson, Lyle, Thurman Munson, Graig Nettles, and Willie Randolph represented the Yankees at All-Star Game at Yankee Stadium.

== Farm system ==
Level	Team	League	Manager
AAA	Syracuse Chiefs	International League	Pete Ward
AA	West Haven Yankees	Eastern League	Mike Ferraro
A	Fort Lauderdale Yankees	Florida State League	Ed Napoleon
A-Short Season	Oneonta Yankees	New York–Penn League	Art Mazmanian

LEAGUE CHAMPIONS: West Haven, Oneonta
