= Mickey Rivers =

American baseball player (born 1948)

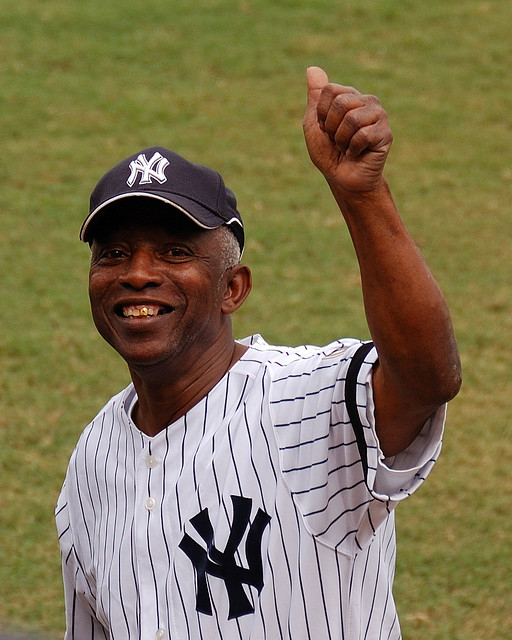
- Rivers in 2010
- Center fielder
- Born: October 30, 1948 (age 78); Miami, Florida, U.S.
- Batted: Left Threw: Left

MLB debut
- August 4, 1970, for the California Angels

Last MLB appearance
- September 30, 1984, for the Texas Rangers

MLB statistics
- Batting average: .295
- Home runs: 61
- Runs batted in: 499
- Stats at Baseball Reference

Teams
- California Angels (1970–1975); New York Yankees (1976–1979); Texas Rangers (1979–1984)

Career highlights and awards
- All-Star (1976); 2× World Series champion (1977, 1978); AL stolen base leader (1975)

John Milton "Mickey" Rivers (born October 30, 1948) is an American former professional baseball player. He played in Major League Baseball from 1970 to 1984 for the California Angels, New York Yankees and Texas Rangers. As a Yankee, he was part of two World Series championship teams, both defeating the Los Angeles Dodgers, in 1977 and 1978. "Mick The Quick" was generally known as a speedy leadoff hitter who made contact and was an excellent center fielder, with a below-average throwing arm.

== Amateur career ==
Rivers graduated from Miami Northwestern Senior High School in 1967. The legend of "Mick the Quick" began during his amateur days at Miami Dade Community College. A fast and athletic outfielder, Rivers emerged as one of the team stars, but once disappeared just moments before the start of a game. His teammates and coaches later discovered Rivers asleep under a nearby tree.

== Professional career ==
=== California Angels ===
Originally signed by the Atlanta Braves, Rivers began his big league career in 1970 with the Angels, playing center field. He stayed with them through the 1975 season. Rivers played part-time in his first few years, until becoming the starter in 1974. He led the American League in triples both years and stole a career-high 70 bases in 1975, tops in the league.

=== New York Yankees ===
Rivers was acquired along with Ed Figueroa by the Yankees from the Angels for Bobby Bonds on December 11, 1975, a trade that immediately paid dividends for the Yankees. Figueroa won 19 games and Rivers enjoyed a career year. Rivers was named to the All-Star team, batted .312, stole 43 bases and posted then-career highs in home runs (8) and runs batted in (67). Rivers placed third in the Most Valuable Player voting behind teammate Thurman Munson and George Brett and was named an outfielder on The Sporting News AL All-Star team.

Rivers posted good numbers in his two other full Yankee seasons, including a .326 batting average in 1977, but was traded in the middle of the 1979 season to Texas.

=== Texas Rangers ===
Now with the Rangers, Rivers set the single-season record for hits by a Ranger with 210 in 1980. He concluded his career in 1984 with a .295 lifetime average, 267 stolen bases and 1,660 hits. Rivers posted a .308 average in his 29 postseason games.

== Legacy ==
While Rivers played for them, the Yankees won the World Series in 1977 and 1978, both times against the Los Angeles Dodgers. They won the 1976 pennant, but lost in the World Series to the Cincinnati Reds. In the 1978 one-game playoff against the Boston Red Sox, Rivers reportedly gave a bat "with a home run in it" to Bucky Dent, who proceeded to hit a home run over the Green Monster in Fenway Park to give the Yankees a 3-2 lead.

In 1983, Rivers got into a fistfight with teammate Mike Richardt on a plane trip home, over what Richardt called a “misunderstanding”.

On September 30, 1984, in Rivers' final major league game, he and the Rangers were the victims of the Angels' Mike Witt's perfect game, Witt winning 1-0.

Bill James ranked Mickey Rivers as the 59th greatest center fielder of all time. His stooped shuffle as he ambled to the plate masked quick speed out of the box on bunts and sustained speed around the bases. He would often twirl his bat after each pitch.

=== Personality ===
Rivers was honored with many of his teammates from the 1977 World Series champion New York Yankees in the Yankee Old Timers Game in 2007.

In The Bronx Is Burning, the ESPN miniseries based on the 1977 Yankees, he was portrayed by Leonard Robinson and depicted as experiencing financial problems.

When Reggie Jackson remarked to a reporter that he had an IQ of 160, Rivers responded, "Out of what, a thousand?". Rivers' tenure in the Bronx produced other classic quotes, such as when he tried to explain the bizarre dynamics of the Yankees, who featured controversial owner George Steinbrenner and contentious manager Billy Martin. "Me and George and Billy," Rivers said, "we’re two of a kind." According to Goose Gossage, when the newly acquired reliever went through a rough stretch of blown saves, Rivers once jumped on top of the bullpen car to prevent Gossage from entering the game.

He was portrayed as the representation of Yankee imperialism by Garrett Morris in the "Bad Red Chinese Ballet" sketch in the November 18, 1978 installment of Saturday Night Live.

== Retirement ==
After baseball, Rivers began training racehorses in his native Florida. His son, Mickey Jr., played minor league baseball in the Rangers organization and his daughter Rhonda is a teacher in the Houston area.

== See also ==
- List of Major League Baseball career stolen bases leaders
- List of Major League Baseball annual stolen base leaders
- List of Major League Baseball annual triples leaders
