= George Zeber =

American baseball player (born 1950)

- Second baseman
- Born: August 29, 1950 (age 76); Ellwood City, Pennsylvania, U.S.
- Batted: Switch Threw: Right

MLB debut
- May 7, 1977, for the New York Yankees

Last MLB appearance
- June 14, 1978, for the New York Yankees

MLB statistics
- Batting average: .296
- Home runs: 3
- Runs batted in: 10
- Stats at Baseball Reference

Teams
- New York Yankees (1977–1978)

Career highlights and awards
- World Series champion (1977)

George William Zeber (/ˈziːbər/ ZEE-bər; born August 29, 1950) is an American former professional baseball player. He played parts of two seasons in Major League Baseball from 1977 to 1978 for the New York Yankees. He was used primarily as a backup to second baseman Willie Randolph.

== Early life ==
Zeber graduated from Loara High School in 1968, and was drafted into the United States Army in 1970 and deployed to Vietnam during the Vietnam War in March 1971. He spent five months in the Quang Tri area and was discharged from the army in September 1971.
