= List of New York Yankees captains =

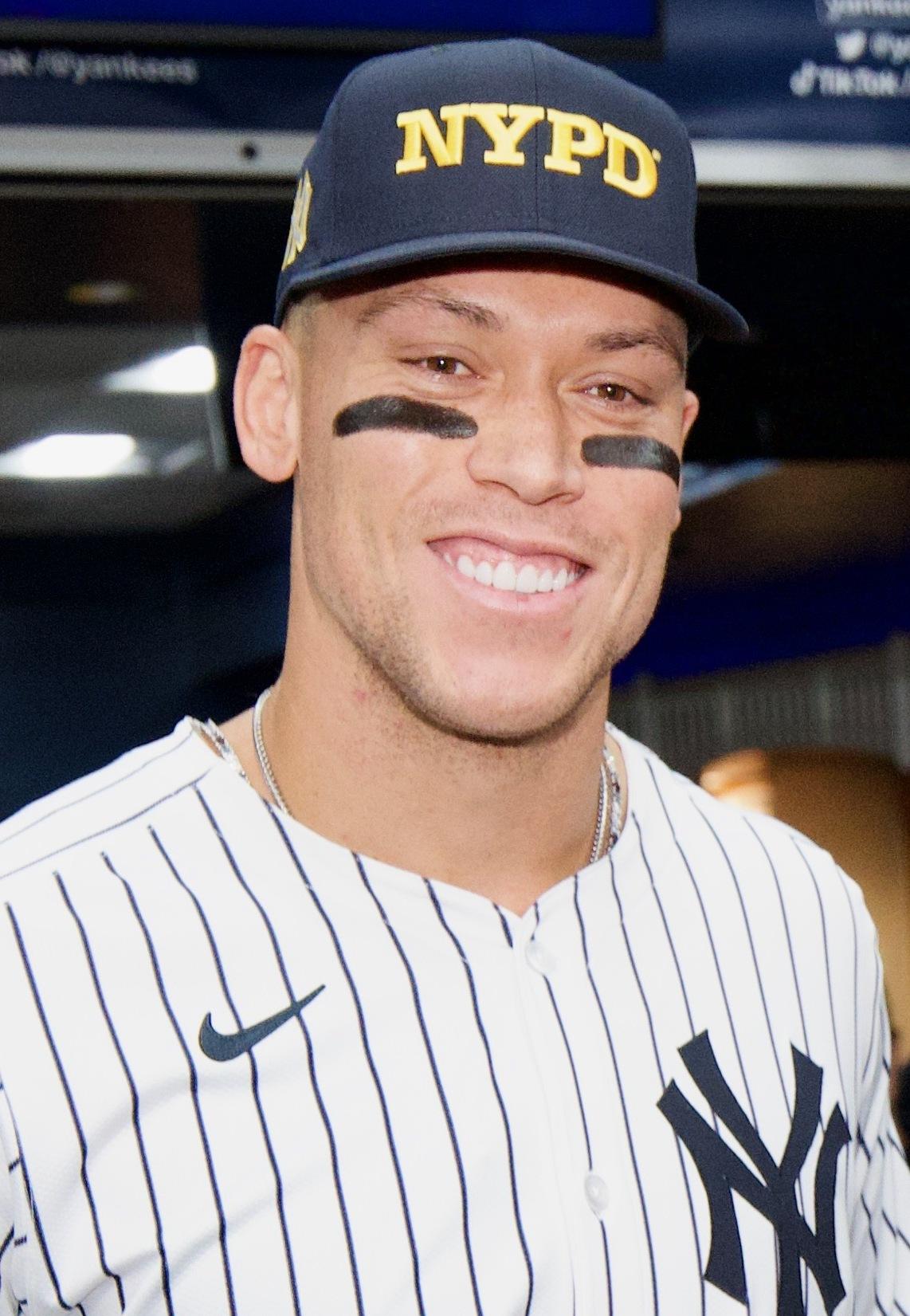
Current Yankees captain Aaron Judge

There have been 16 captains of the New York Yankees of Major League Baseball, an American professional baseball franchise also known previously as the New York Highlanders. The role is currently held by Aaron Judge, who was named the captain on December 21, 2022.

In baseball, the captain formerly served as the on-field leader of the team, while the manager operated the team from the dugout. In the early 20th century, MLB teams were required to name an on-field captain, who was responsible for making pitching changes, positioning fielders, and talking with umpires. Managers were restricted to working with the players in the dugout. By the mid-1910s, managers took on the roles previously assigned to the captain, and the captain role became ceremonial.

Clark Griffith captained the team from their inaugural season in 1903 through 1905. Kid Elberfeld was captain from 1906 to 1907, and was followed by Willie Keeler from 1908 to 1909. Hal Chase served in the role from 1910 through 1912. Frank Chance began the 1913 season as captain. When the team traded for Rollie Zeider, he succeeded Chance in the role. Roger Peckinpaugh served as captain from 1914 through 1922, until he was traded to the Boston Red Sox. He was succeeded by Babe Ruth, who was quickly deposed as captain for climbing into the stands to confront a heckler. Lou Gehrig was named captain in 1935, serving for the remainder of his career. After the death of Gehrig, then manager Joe McCarthy declared that the Yankees would never have another captain.

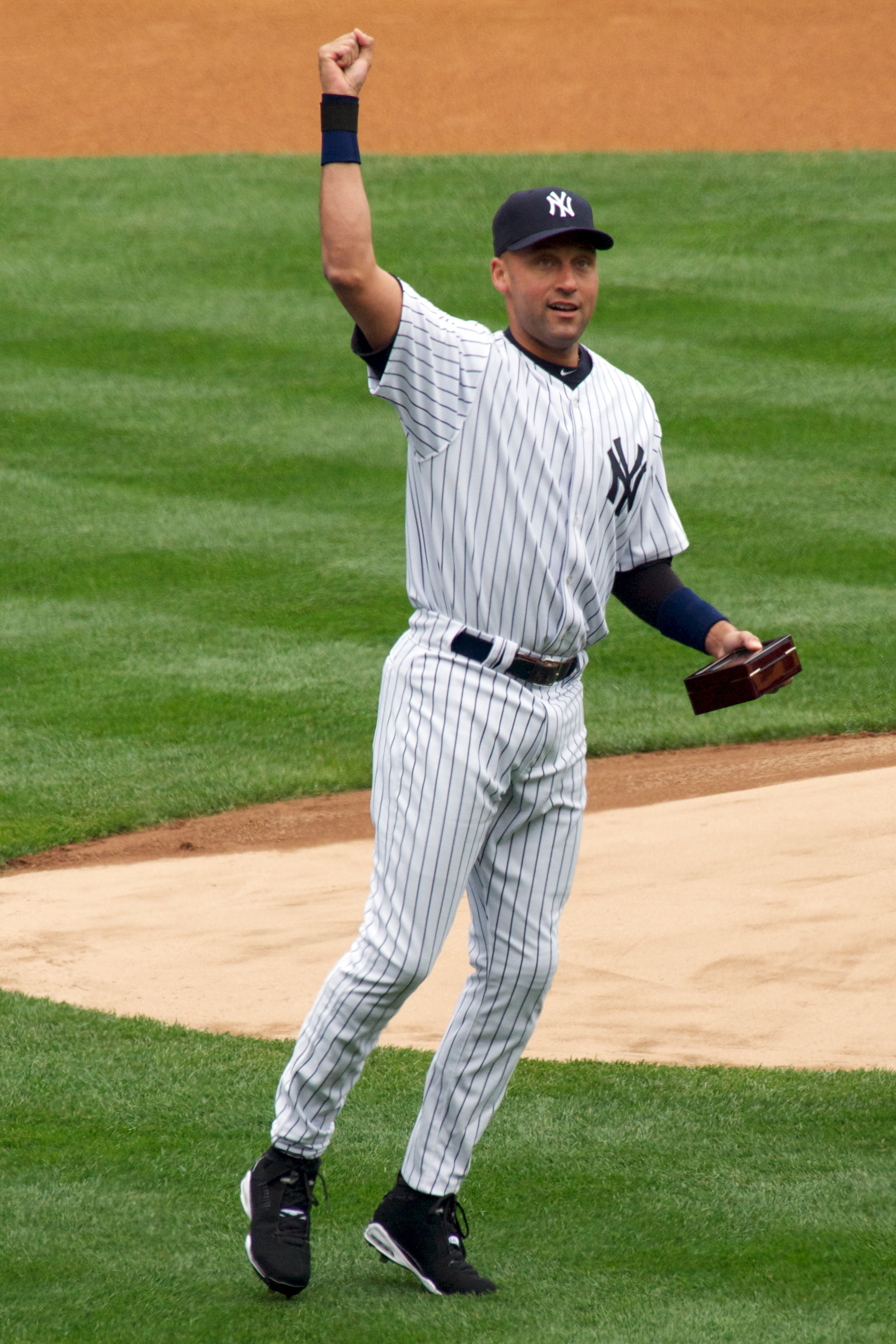
Derek Jeter was the longest-tenured captain in Yankees history

The role remained vacant until team owner George Steinbrenner named Thurman Munson as captain in 1976. Following Munson's death, Graig Nettles served as captain. Willie Randolph and Ron Guidry were named co-captains in 1986. Don Mattingly followed them as captain in 1991, serving until his retirement in 1995. Derek Jeter was named captain of the Yankees in 2003, and he held the post until he retired in 2014. Gehrig, Munson, Guidry, Mattingly and Jeter are the only team captains who spent their entire career with the Yankees (Aaron Judge has spent his entire career with the Yankees, but is still active). Jeter is the longest-tenured captain in franchise history.

When the Yankees named Jeter captain in 2003, the team recognized him as their 11th captain, rather than their 15th. Howard W. Rosenberg, a baseball historian, found that the official count of Yankees captains failed to include Griffith, Elberfeld, and Chance. In addition, right after The New York Times reported Rosenberg's research in 2007, Society for American Baseball Research member Clifford Blau found that Keeler was a team captain, research that Rosenberg confirmed. Though some newspaper articles referred to Everett Scott as captain from 1922 to 1925, the Yankees recognize him as an "acting captain" during the 1922 and 1923 World Series and do not include him on their list.

When Aaron Judge was named captain in 2022, the Yankees and affiliated media outlets, such as their majority-owned regional sports network YES Network, recognized him as the franchise's 16th captain, reflecting the revised historical count that includes Griffith, Elberfeld, Chance, and Keeler.

== Captains ==
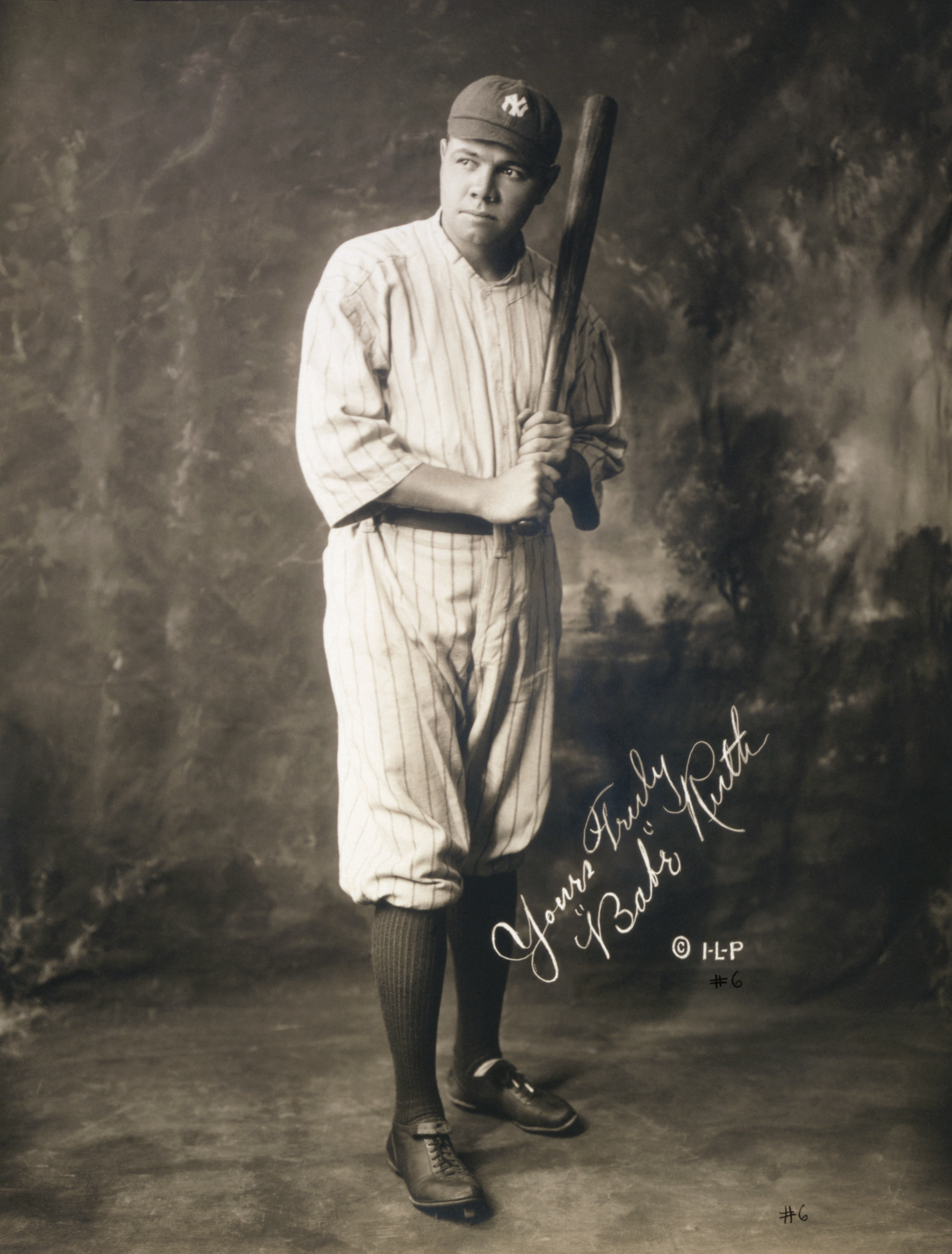
Babe Ruth was captain of the Yankees in 1922.

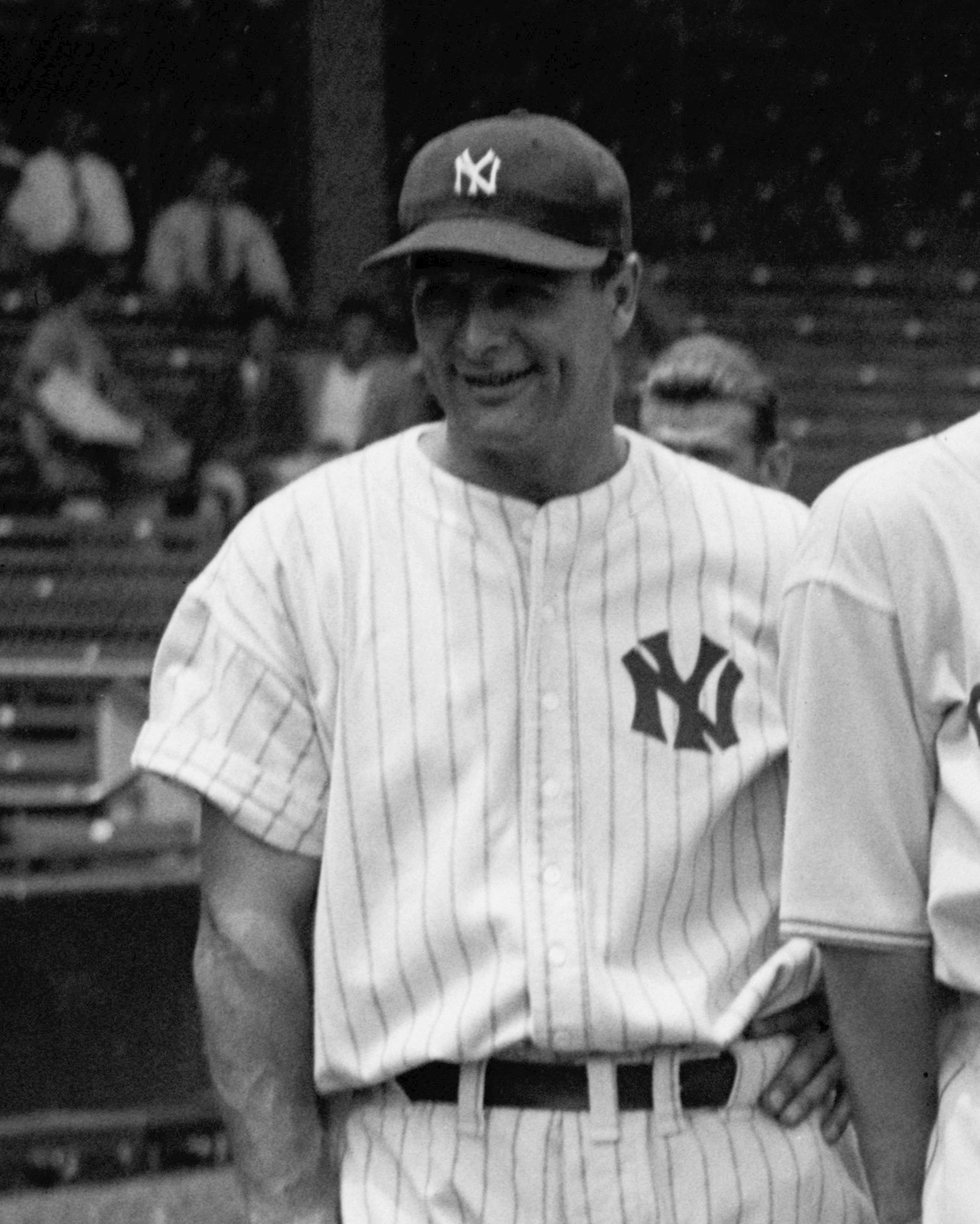
Lou Gehrig served as Yankees captain from 1935 through his retirement in 1939.

Key
Years active	Years of the captain's playing career
Tenure	Tenure as captain
†	Elected to the National Baseball Hall of Fame
‡	Denotes a co-captain

New York Yankees captains
Player	Position	Years active	Tenure	Ref
Clark Griffith^{†}	Pitcher	1891–1914	1903–1905	
Kid Elberfeld	Shortstop	1898–1914	1906–1907	
Willie Keeler^{†}	Outfielder	1892–1910	1908–1909	
Hal Chase	First baseman	1905–1919	1910–1912	
Frank Chance^{†}	First baseman	1898–1914	1913	
Rollie Zeider	Shortstop	1910–1918	1913	
Roger Peckinpaugh	Shortstop	1910–1927	1914–1921	
Babe Ruth^{†}	Outfielder	1914–1935	1922	
Lou Gehrig^{†}	First baseman	1923–1939	1935–1939	
Thurman Munson	Catcher	1969–1979	1976–1979	
Graig Nettles	Third baseman	1967–1988	1982–1984	
Willie Randolph^{‡}	Second baseman	1975–1992	1986–1988	
Ron Guidry^{‡}	Pitcher	1975–1988	1986–1988	
Don Mattingly	First baseman	1982–1995	1991–1995	
Derek Jeter^{†}	Shortstop	1995–2014	2003–2014	
Aaron Judge	Outfielder	2016–present	2023–present	

== See also ==
- New York Yankees all-time roster
- List of New York Yankees coaches
