= The Bronx Is Burning =

2007 television mini-series about the 1977 New York Yankees

- Genre: Drama
- Created by: Jonathan Mahler
- Directed by: Jeremiah Chechik
- Starring: John Turturro; Oliver Platt; Daniel Sunjata
- Country of origin: United States
- No. of episodes: 8

Production
- Executive producers: Mike Tollin; Brian Robbins; Joe Davola
- Running time: 60 minutes

Original release
- Network: ESPN
- Release: July 10 – August 28, 2007

The Bronx Is Burning (stylized as The Bronx is Burning) is an American drama television series that debuted on ESPN on July 10, 2007, after the 2007 MLB Home Run Derby. It is an eight-episode mini-series adapted from Jonathan Mahler's best-selling book, Ladies and Gentlemen, the Bronx Is Burning. The book focuses on baseball's triumph over the turmoil and hysteria of 1977 New York City and how the New York Yankees came to embody the hopes and fears of an unforgettable summer with Billy Martin and Reggie Jackson's warfare under George Steinbrenner's leadership.

The show stars Daniel Sunjata, Oliver Platt, and John Turturro, while executive producers Mike Tollin, Brian Robbins, Joe Davola, writer and executive producer James Solomon, and director Jeremiah Chechik work on the show. The series is produced by ESPN Original Entertainment in conjunction with Tollin/Robbins Productions. Filming began on September 18, 2006, in Connecticut and New York. The 2007 debut of the series marked the 30th anniversary of the 1977 World Series win for the Yankees, the first under Steinbrenner. After airing on ESPN, the episodes were placed on ABC on Demand.

== Summary ==
The central theme of the adaptation is the 1977 New York Yankees against the backdrop of New York City. Yankee superstar Reggie Jackson (Daniel Sunjata) and manager Billy Martin (John Turturro) are locked in a perpetual state of warfare. Jackson was a perfect foil for the scrappy Martin, a popular former Yankee player and reminder of the less complicated past of the team and the city. While owner George Steinbrenner (Oliver Platt) was an autocratic boss, he was also intent on keeping his promise to delivering a World Series title.

The show also features subplots concerning the New York City Police Department's pursuit of the Son of Sam serial killer that year and the blackout and resultant widespread looting in July, all while the city suffered through financial bankruptcy and massive municipal layoffs. Another subplot focused on the 1977 New York City mayoral election featuring incumbent mayor Abraham Beame, former U.S. Representative Bella Abzug, future Governor Mario Cuomo, and Congressman Ed Koch, the eventual winner.

The title refers to an off-the-cuff comment widely thought to have been made by broadcaster Howard Cosell during the ABC telecast of Game Two of the 1977 World Series. In fact, he said nothing of the sort.

Episodes were filmed in New London, Waterford and Norwich in Connecticut as well as in New York City. New London stood in for New York City and Dodd Stadium in Norwich stood in for Yankee Stadium. The series' soundtrack consisted of songs by the Ramones.

== Episodes ==
No. overall	No. in season	Title	Directed by	Written by	Original release date
1	1	"The Straw"	Jeremiah S. Chechik	Harley Peyton and Jonathan Mahler	July 10, 2007
The year is 1977. The New York Yankees are coming off their embarrassing loss to the Cincinnati Reds in the 1976 World Series. The Son of Sam has killed his first victim. Yankees' owner George Steinbrenner and manager Billy Martin discuss which free agent to sign, settling on Reggie Jackson. As spring training begins, Martin and Steinbrenner argue.
2	2	"Team in Turmoil"	Jeremiah S. Chechik	Gordon Greisman, Michael Lucas, and James D. Solomon	July 17, 2007
The 1977 season has begun, but the Yankees struggle. Tensions rise between Thurman Munson and Reggie Jackson. Meanwhile, the NYPD creates the Omega Task Force to capture the ".44 caliber killer". Also, the election for mayor of New York is heating up. Incumbent mayor Abraham Beame is challenged by Representative Ed Koch, New York Secretary of State Mario Cuomo, and feminist activist Bella Abzug for the Democratic nomination.
3	3	"Time for a Change?"	Jeremiah S. Chechik	Kyle Harimoto, Michael Lucas, and James D. Solomon	July 24, 2007
During a nationally televised game, Jackson fails to hustle after a ball, setting up a fight in the dugout with Martin. Steinbrenner decides to fire Martin, but is convinced by his players not to do so. The press continues to investigate the Son of Sam. Abzug takes the lead in the mayoral race.
4	4	"The Seven Commandments"	Jeremiah S. Chechik	Gordon Greisman and James D. Solomon	July 31, 2007
Munson publicizes his discontent with the team in the press. A major blackout covers the city in darkness. Martin and Steinbrenner make a deal regarding Jackson, but he breaks the terms, leading Gabe Paul to ask Dick Howser if he would take over. The NYPD picks up the search as the anniversary of the Son of Sam's first murder approaches.
5	5	"Caught!"	Jeremiah S. Chechik	Gordon Greisman, James D. Solomon, and Jim Sterling	August 1, 2007
With Jackson batting cleanup, the Yankees go on a hot streak. Following a new lead, the Omega Task Force closes in on the Son of Sam, making the arrest.
6	6	"The Game's Not as Easy as It Looks, Fellas"	Jeremiah S. Chechik	Nick Davis and Gordon Greisman	August 8, 2007
Ed Koch wins the Democratic primary in the mayoral election, and the Yankees win the division. This emboldens Martin to ask for a contract extension, a request Steinbrenner declines. The Yankees face the Kansas City Royals in the ALCS. Jackson's struggles lead Martin to bench him.
7	7	"Past Combatants"	Jeremiah S. Chechik	Gordon Greisman, James D. Solomon, and Jonathan Mahler	August 15, 2007
The Yankees and Los Angeles Dodgers face off in the World Series. Steinbrenner makes a decision about Martin's future.
8	8	"Mr. October"	Jeremiah S. Chechik	Michael Lucas and James D. Solomon	August 22, 2007
Jackson makes history in Game 6 of the World Series.

== Cast ==
- John Turturro, Yankees manager Billy Martin
- Daniel Sunjata, Yankees outfielder Reggie Jackson
- Oliver Platt, Yankees owner George Steinbrenner
- Kevin Conway, Yankees president Gabe Paul
- Daryl Blonder, Yankees batboy Ray Negron
- Rob Lavin, Yankees pitcher Ken Holtzman
- Erik Jensen, Yankees catcher Thurman Munson
- Loren Dean, Yankees back-up catcher Fran Healy
- Seth Gilliam, Yankees outfielder Paul Blair
- Joe Grifasi, Yankees bench coach Yogi Berra
- Mather Zickel, Yankees outfielder Lou Piniella
- Alex Cranmer, Yankees third baseman Graig Nettles
- Evan Hart, Yankees shortstop Bucky Dent
- Dock Pollard, Yankees second baseman Willie Randolph
- Lou Provenzano, Yankees pitcher Ron Guidry
- Darby Brown, Yankees designated hitter Cliff Johnson
- Jason Kosow, Yankees pitcher Catfish Hunter
- Max Casella, Yankees third base coach Dick Howser
- Leonard Robinson, Yankees outfielder Mickey Rivers
- Christopher McDonald, Yankees Hall of Famer Joe DiMaggio
- Tom Wiggin, Yankees Hall of Famer Whitey Ford
- Josh Pais, Reporter Phil Pepe
- Dan Lauria, Captain Joseph Borelli
- Nestor Serrano, Detective Kavanaugh
- Stephen Lang, Deputy Inspector Timothy Dowd
- John Mahoney, News Reporter (Background Casting)
- Casey Siemaszko, Detective Welker
- Josiah Schlatter, Clubhouse attendant
- Michael Rispoli, Newspaper columnist Jimmy Breslin
- Seán Martin Hingston, Newspaper reporter Steve Dunleavy
- Paul Marini, David Berkowitz
- Emily Wickersham, Suzy Steinbrenner
- Russell Woron-Simons, Student watching TV
- Jason Giambi, Taxi cab driver

== See also ==
- List of baseball films
