= Ed Figueroa =

Puerto Rican baseball player (born 1948)

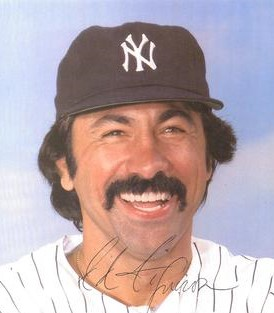
- Pitcher
- Born: October 14, 1948 (age 78); Ciales, Puerto Rico
- Batted: Right Threw: Right

MLB debut
- April 9, 1974, for the California Angels

Last MLB appearance
- September 27, 1981, for the Oakland Athletics

MLB statistics
- Win–loss record: 80–67
- Earned run average: 3.51
- Strikeouts: 571
- Stats at Baseball Reference

Teams
- California Angels (1974–1975); New York Yankees (1976–1980); Texas Rangers (1980); Oakland Athletics (1981)

Career highlights and awards
- 2× World Series champion (1977, 1978)

Eduardo Figueroa Padilla (born October 14, 1948) is a Puerto Rican former professional baseball player. Listed at 6' 1" (1.86 m), 190 lb. (86 k), Figueroa batted and threw right handed. He was born in Ciales, Puerto Rico.

Figueroa is the only pitcher from Puerto Rico to win twenty games in a regular major league season.

== Career ==
=== Early career, service in the Marines ===
Figueroa originally signed with the New York Mets as a seventeen-year-old amateur free agent in 1966. He went 12–5 with a 2.05 earned run average with the Winter Haven Mets in 1967, and seemed well on his way to the majors when was called to take a draft physical in Puerto Rico. After three weeks away from his team, the Raleigh-Durham Mets, he hurt his arm in his first game back. The Mets released him, and Figueroa joined the United States Marine Corps, spending the next year in Vietnam.

Upon his honorable discharge from the Marine Corps in 1970, Figueroa signed with the San Francisco Giants. After three seasons in their organization, he was traded to the California Angels for Bruce Christensen and Don Rose on July 6, 1973.

=== California Angels ===
Figueroa made his major league debut on April 9, 1974. After Nolan Ryan had given up three runs to the Texas Rangers, he was replaced in the second inning with the bases loaded and no outs. Skip Lockwood struck out the first batter he faced, then gave up a grand slam to Jeff Burroughs. The Angels were already behind 10–2 when Figueroa was called into the game in the eighth inning. He gave up one hit in two innings.

On July 6, Figueroa pitched a complete game in which he only gave up one earned run while striking out six with six hits. He received no run support from his team, and his first decision was a 1–0 loss to Cleveland. His next start was also a complete game. This time he received run support, and shut out the Boston Red Sox, 7–0, at Fenway Park. The 1974 Angels were a last place team which lost 94. Figueroa ended up with a 2–8 record despite a solid 3.67 ERA.

After splitting 1974 between starts and relief appearances, Figueroa was added to the starting rotation for 1975. The Angels were again a last place team, yet Figueroa still managed to put up respectable numbers, going 16–13 with a 2.91 ERA.

=== New York Yankees ===
Figueroa was acquired along with Mickey Rivers by the New York Yankees from the Angels for Bobby Bonds on December 11, 1975. He joined a Yankees pitching staff that included Catfish Hunter and Dock Ellis, yet it was Figueroa who turned out to be the staff ace, going 19–10 with a 3.02 ERA to finish fourth in American League Cy Young Award balloting behind Jim Palmer, Mark Fidrych and former California teammate Frank Tanana in 1976.

Figueroa's numbers tailed off slightly in 1977, as he went 16–11 with a 3.57 ERA for the 1977 World Series champions. He was 7–7 with a 3.91 ERA when he took the mound against the Minnesota Twins on July 19, 1978. Figueroa pitched a complete-game shutout, and went 13–2 for the remainder of the season to help lead the charge from fourteen games back to overtake the Boston Red Sox in the American League East.

Figueroa suffered from an arm injury in 1979, and was limited to sixteen starts. On July 20, 1980, Figueroa was tagged by the Kansas City Royals for five earned runs in two innings. His ERA ballooned to 6.98, and he was placed on waivers shortly afterwards. The Texas Rangers purchased his contract just before the July 31 trade deadline.

=== Oakland A's ===
In Texas, Figueroa was 0–7 with a 5.90 ERA for the Rangers in 1980. He re-signed with the Rangers for 1981, but was released after six minor league starts in which he was 2–1 with a 7.83 ERA.

Shortly afterwards, he signed with former Yankees skipper Billy Martin and the Oakland Athletics, and posted a far more respectable 3.34 ERA with their Pacific Coast League affiliate, the Tacoma Tigers. He earned a promotion to the majors, and made his final major league start on September 6 against the Baltimore Orioles. He was leading 4–2 when an injury forced his early departure in the fifth inning.

Figueroa made five minor league starts for the A's in 1982, and was 0–3 with an 18.24 ERA. He was offered a minor league deal by the Milwaukee Brewers for 1982, but chose instead to retire.

In between, Figueroa pitched for the Gold Coast Suns of the Senior Professional Baseball Association in 1989. He also played winter ball with the Lobos de Arecibo, Criollos de Caguas and Cangrejeros de Santurce clubs of the Puerto Rico Baseball League. While pitching for Caguas, he led the league in wins on back-to-back seasons, recording 10-3 twice in the 1973-74 and 1974-75 campaigns.

Major League Baseball pitching statistics

Seasons	W	L	PCT	ERA	G	GS	CG	SHO	SV	IP	H	ER	R	HR	BB	K	WP	HBP
Eight	80	67	.544	3.51	200	179	63	12	1	1309.2	1299	511	571	90	443	571	25	19

Figueroa posted a 0–4 record with a 7.47 ERA in seven post-season starts.

=== Late years ===
Figueroa lives in Guaynabo, Puerto Rico, and owns two restaurants, named Lupis in Old San Juan and near the San Juan airport.

== See also ==
- List of Major League Baseball players from Puerto Rico
