= 1977 World Series =

74th edition of Major League Baseball's championship series

| Team (Wins) | Managers | Season |
|---|---|---|
| New York Yankees (4) | Billy Martin | 100–62 (.617), GA: 2 1/2 |
| Los Angeles Dodgers (2) | Tommy Lasorda | 98–64 (.605), GA: 10 |
- Dates: October 11–18
- Venue(s): Yankee Stadium (New York); Dodger Stadium (Los Angeles)
- MVP: Reggie Jackson (New York)
- Umpires: Nestor Chylak (AL), Ed Sudol (NL), Larry McCoy (AL), Jerry Dale (NL), Jim Evans (AL), John McSherry (NL)
- Hall of Famers: Yankees: Catfish Hunter; Reggie Jackson; Yogi Berra (coach); Bobby Cox (1st base coach); Dodgers: Tommy Lasorda (mgr.); Don Sutton; Umpires: Nestor Chylak

Broadcast
- Television: ABC
- TV announcers: Keith Jackson, Howard Cosell, and Tom Seaver
- Radio: CBS
- Radio announcers: Ross Porter (in New York); Bill White (in Los Angeles); Win Elliot
- ALCS: New York Yankees over Kansas City Royals (3–2)
- NLCS: Los Angeles Dodgers over Philadelphia Phillies (3–1)

The 1977 World Series was the championship series of Major League Baseball's (MLB) 1977 season. The 74th edition of the World Series, it was a best-of-seven playoff played between the American League (AL) champion New York Yankees and the National League (NL) champion Los Angeles Dodgers. The Yankees defeated the Dodgers four games to two to win the franchise's 21st World Series championship, their first since 1962, and the first under the ownership of George Steinbrenner (who assumed ownership of the club in 1973). Played from October 11 to 18, the Series was televised on ABC.

During this Series, Reggie Jackson earned his nickname "Mr. October" for his heroics. Billy Martin won what would be his only World Series title as a manager after guiding the Yankees to a second straight pennant.

This was the first six-game World Series since the Dodgers defeated the Chicago White Sox in 1959. In between, ten World Series went the full seven games, three ended in four-game sweeps, and four lasted five games.

== Route to the series ==
=== New York Yankees ===
The New York Yankees returned to the World Series after being swept by the Cincinnati Reds the previous year. In free agency, the Yankees signed slugging right fielder Reggie Jackson for US$2.96 million ($16,747,368 in current dollar terms) over five years and Cincinnati Reds ace pitcher Don Gullett for $2 million ($11,315,789 in current dollar terms) over six years. Two other key players were acquired by the Yankees through trades. Shortstop Bucky Dent was picked up from the Chicago White Sox for outfielder Oscar Gamble, pitcher LaMarr Hoyt, and $200,000. After only one year with the Oakland Athletics, pitcher Mike Torrez was acquired in exchange for pitcher Dock Ellis and utilitymen Marty Perez and Larry Murray.

New York had a lackluster first half, highlighted by the famous Billy Martin and Reggie Jackson near fight on a nationally televised game against the Boston Red Sox at Fenway Park. Martin was furious over Jackson's lack of hustle on a fly ball by Jim Rice, leading to the heated dugout confrontation. The Yankees finished strong, winning 38 of their last 51 games, edging both the Red Sox and the Baltimore Orioles by 2 1/2 games. Among the star-laden lineup was an emerging superstar, Ron Guidry. Early in the season Guidry was moved from the bullpen into the starting rotation, finishing 16–7 with a 2.82 ERA. The Yankees advanced to the World Series after beating the Kansas City Royals in an exciting fifth and final 1977 American League Championship Series (ALCS) game, winning it with three runs in the top of the ninth on a string of singles and a costly error by George Brett.

=== Los Angeles Dodgers ===
The National League champion Los Angeles Dodgers were managed by Tommy Lasorda, who was in his first full season as manager. The 1977 Dodgers became the first team to have four players hit 30 or more home runs in one season, as Steve Garvey hit 33, Reggie Smith hit 32, Ron Cey hit 30, and Dusty Baker hit 30. The pitching staff, which led the National League in ERA, 3.22, were led by 20-game winner Tommy John and closer Charlie Hough with 22 saves. The Dodgers won 22 of their first 26 games, winning the Western Division by 10 games over the Cincinnati Reds, then eliminated the Philadelphia Phillies in the 1977 National League Championship Series (NLCS) in four games.

=== Series preview ===
The matchup of the Yankees and the Dodgers harkened back to the "Subway Series" matchups between the two teams of the 1940s and 1950s. The two teams had met in eight previous World Series, with the Yankees winning in 1941, 1947, 1949, 1952, 1953, and 1956 and the Dodgers in 1955 and 1963. The 1963 series was their first meeting after the Dodgers had moved from Brooklyn to Los Angeles in 1958. This was the fifth meeting between teams from Los Angeles and New York City for a major professional sports championship, which previously occurred in the 1963 World Series and three NBA Finals (1970, 1972, 1973).

This was the first World Series in which the ceremonial first pitches were from the mound instead of from the Commissioner's box, although this did not become permanent until 1989.

== Summary ==
AL New York Yankees (4) vs. NL Los Angeles Dodgers (2)

| Game | Date | Score | Location | Time | Attendance |
|---|---|---|---|---|---|
| 1 | October 11 | Los Angeles Dodgers – 3, New York Yankees – 4 (12) | Yankee Stadium | 3:24 | 56,668 |
| 2 | October 12 | Los Angeles Dodgers – 6, New York Yankees – 1 | Yankee Stadium | 2:27 | 56,691 |
| 3 | October 14 | New York Yankees – 5, Los Angeles Dodgers – 3 | Dodger Stadium | 2:31 | 55,992 |
| 4 | October 15 | New York Yankees – 4, Los Angeles Dodgers – 2 | Dodger Stadium | 2:07 | 55,995 |
| 5 | October 16 | New York Yankees – 4, Los Angeles Dodgers – 10 | Dodger Stadium | 2:29 | 55,955 |
| 6 | October 18 | Los Angeles Dodgers – 4, New York Yankees – 8 | Yankee Stadium | 2:18 | 56,407 |

== Matchups ==
=== Game 1 ===
October 11, 1977 8:15 pm (ET) at Yankee Stadium in Bronx, New York 57 °F (14 °C), mostly cloudy
| Team | 1 | 2 | 3 | 4 | 5 | 6 | 7 | 8 | 9 | 10 | 11 | 12 | R | H | E |
|---|---|---|---|---|---|---|---|---|---|---|---|---|---|---|---|
| Los Angeles | 2 | 0 | 0 | 0 | 0 | 0 | 0 | 0 | 1 | 0 | 0 | 0 | 3 | 6 | 0 |
| New York | 1 | 0 | 0 | 0 | 0 | 1 | 0 | 1 | 0 | 0 | 0 | 1 | 4 | 11 | 0 |
WP: Sparky Lyle (1–0) LP: Rick Rhoden (0–1); Home runs: LAD: None; NYY: Willie Randolph (1)

The Dodgers scored twice in the top of the first inning, when Davey Lopes walked and scored on a Bill Russell triple off Don Gullett. Ron Cey made it 2–0 on a sacrifice fly. In the bottom of the inning, the Yankees responded with consecutive two-out singles by Thurman Munson, Reggie Jackson, and Chris Chambliss, scoring Munson.

In the top of the sixth inning, Steve Garvey beat out a bunt and, with two out, attempted to score from first on a hit-and-run single to center field by Glenn Burke. Mickey Rivers, who did not possess a strong throwing arm, threw home. Replays showed Garvey clearly beat the tag but he was called out at the plate. The Yankees tied it in their half of the sixth inning when Willie Randolph hit a home run off Don Sutton.

The Yankees took the lead in the eighth inning when Munson doubled home Randolph. Later in the inning, the Yankees loaded the bases with one out, but Dodger reliever Elías Sosa struck out Lou Piniella and retired Bucky Dent on a forceout to end the threat.

The Dodgers tied it at 3–3 in the ninth inning Dusty Baker led off with a single and was almost picked off first when pinch-hitter Manny Mota failed on a bunt attempt. Mota flied out, but Steve Yeager walked and pinch-hitter Lee Lacy drove Baker home with a single.

In extra innings, the Yankees got their leadoff hitters on in both the tenth and eleventh innings but did not score due to failure to lay down sacrifice bunts. Finally, in the 12th, Randolph led off and doubled and Munson was walked intentionally. Yankee manager Billy Martin at first wanted Paul Blair, the next hitter, to try to sacrifice again, but after two failed attempts, Martin had Blair hit away and Blair singled home Randolph with the game-winner.

1977 AL Cy Young award winner Sparky Lyle took the win in Game 1 and, coupled with his wins in Games 4 and 5 of the 1977 ALCS, as of 2019 is the only pitcher to win three consecutive decisions in a single postseason.

=== Game 2 ===
October 12, 1977 8:15 pm (ET) at Yankee Stadium in Bronx, New York 55 °F (13 °C), partly cloudy
| Team | 1 | 2 | 3 | 4 | 5 | 6 | 7 | 8 | 9 | R | H | E |
|---|---|---|---|---|---|---|---|---|---|---|---|---|
| Los Angeles | 2 | 1 | 2 | 0 | 0 | 0 | 0 | 0 | 1 | 6 | 9 | 0 |
| New York | 0 | 0 | 0 | 1 | 0 | 0 | 0 | 0 | 0 | 1 | 5 | 0 |
WP: Burt Hooton (1–0) LP: Catfish Hunter (0–1); Home runs: LAD: Ron Cey (1), Steve Yeager (1), Reggie Smith (1), Steve Garvey (1); NYY: None

With aces Ron Guidry and Mike Torrez having both pitched in Game 5 of the ALCS, Billy Martin was forced to use a sore-shouldered Catfish Hunter in Game 2. The Dodgers hit three homers in the first three innings off Hunter, as Ron Cey hit a two-run home run in the first, Steve Yeager a home run in the second, and Reggie Smith a two-run home run in the third. Steve Garvey hit a home run in the ninth off of Sparky Lyle. Burt Hooton pitched a five-hit complete game, allowing only run one in the fourth on Reggie Jackson's ground ball double play after Willie Randolph and Thurman Munson led off the inning with back-to-back singles. Hooton made amends for his meltdown in Game 3 of the 1977 NLCS.

About an hour before the first pitch, a fire had started in Public School 3, an abandoned elementary school a few blocks east of Yankee Stadium. During the game, ABC cut to a helicopter camera for an overhead view of Yankee Stadium and the surrounding neighborhood, catching the fire.

=== Game 3 ===
October 14, 1977 5:15 pm (PT) at Dodger Stadium in Los Angeles, California 68 °F (20 °C), cloudy
| Team | 1 | 2 | 3 | 4 | 5 | 6 | 7 | 8 | 9 | R | H | E |
|---|---|---|---|---|---|---|---|---|---|---|---|---|
| New York | 3 | 0 | 0 | 1 | 1 | 0 | 0 | 0 | 0 | 5 | 10 | 0 |
| Los Angeles | 0 | 0 | 3 | 0 | 0 | 0 | 0 | 0 | 0 | 3 | 7 | 1 |
WP: Mike Torrez (1–0) LP: Tommy John (0–1); Home runs: NYY: None; LAD: Dusty Baker (1)

The Yankees struck for three runs in the first off Tommy John. Mickey Rivers led off with a bloop double to right (his first hit of the series) and scored on a harder-hit Thurman Munson double to right. Reggie Jackson singled to left to score Munson and went to second when Dodger left fielder Dusty Baker overran the ball. Lou Piniella then scored Jackson on an RBI single up the middle to make it 3–0.

Baker atoned for his first-inning error by hitting a three-run homer in the third off Yankee starter Mike Torrez. The Yankees regained the lead with single runs in the fourth and fifth on an RBI groundout by Rivers, who finished the game with three hits (including two doubles), and an RBI single by Chris Chambliss. Torrez then shut out the Dodgers for the rest of the way. Torrez finished with nine strikeouts in the complete-game win.

Before the game, a moment of silence was held in memory of entertainer and former Pittsburgh Pirates co-owner Bing Crosby, who died earlier that day.

==== National anthem ====
Before the game, Linda Ronstadt sang the national anthem, standing alone in center field wearing jeans and a Dodgers warmup jacket. The attire drew much media attention afterwards. The performance itself was later ranked by the Washington Examiner as the second-best national anthem rendition at a sporting event; according to the magazine, "it was such a hit Ronstadt wore a similar satin jacket — along with short shorts, kneepads and roller skates — on the cover of her 1978 album, Living in the USA."

=== Game 4 ===
October 15, 1977 1:15 pm (PT) at Dodger Stadium in Los Angeles, California 70 °F (21 °C), clear
| Team | 1 | 2 | 3 | 4 | 5 | 6 | 7 | 8 | 9 | R | H | E |
|---|---|---|---|---|---|---|---|---|---|---|---|---|
| New York | 0 | 3 | 0 | 0 | 0 | 1 | 0 | 0 | 0 | 4 | 7 | 0 |
| Los Angeles | 0 | 0 | 2 | 0 | 0 | 0 | 0 | 0 | 0 | 2 | 4 | 0 |
WP: Ron Guidry (1–0) LP: Doug Rau (0–1); Home runs: NYY: Reggie Jackson (1); LAD: Davey Lopes (1)

With Don Sutton needing another day of rest, Dodger manager Tommy Lasorda started left-hander Doug Rau to counter the Yankees' left-handed power. Rau was rusty, having only pitched in relief in one game of the 1977 NLCS. After a relatively easy first inning, Reggie Jackson hit a leadoff double in the second. Lou Piniella singled Jackson home with the first run and was doubled to third by Chris Chambliss. Lasorda then pulled Rau in favor of Rick Rhoden, resulting in a heated argument between Lasorda and Rau on the mound. At that point, Rau had given up four hits, including three to left-handed hitters. The Yankees scored two more runs in the inning on an RBI groundout by Graig Nettles and an RBI single by Bucky Dent.

The Dodgers scored twice in the third. Rhoden, a good hitting pitcher, hit a ground-rule double to left, and Davey Lopes followed with a two-run homer off Yankee starter Ron Guidry. The Dodgers scored nothing else off Guidry, as he pitched a four-hit complete game.

The Dodgers almost tied the game in the fourth when Ron Cey sent a drive to deep left that Lou Piniella leaped up and caught. Jackson ended the scoring with an opposite-field home run off Rhoden in the sixth inning.

=== Game 5 ===
October 16, 1977 1:15 pm (PT) at Dodger Stadium in Los Angeles, California 70 °F (21 °C), mostly clear
| Team | 1 | 2 | 3 | 4 | 5 | 6 | 7 | 8 | 9 | R | H | E |
|---|---|---|---|---|---|---|---|---|---|---|---|---|
| New York | 0 | 0 | 0 | 0 | 0 | 0 | 2 | 2 | 0 | 4 | 9 | 2 |
| Los Angeles | 1 | 0 | 0 | 4 | 3 | 2 | 0 | 0 | X | 10 | 13 | 0 |
WP: Don Sutton (1–0) LP: Don Gullett (0–1); Home runs: NYY: Thurman Munson (1), Reggie Jackson (2); LAD: Steve Yeager (2), Reggie Smith (2)

The Dodgers needed a win to send the Series back to New York. Davey Lopes led off the first with a triple and came home when Bill Russell singled. In the fourth, the Dodgers had an RBI single by Dusty Baker and a three-run homer by Steve Yeager. Baker added another RBI single in the fifth, Lee Lacy singled home a run, and Yeager batted in another run with a sacrifice fly. Reggie Smith completed the scoring with a two-run homer in the sixth inning.

The Yankees scored two runs each in the seventh and eighth; the two runs in the eighth coming on back-to-back homers by Thurman Munson and Reggie Jackson. Nevertheless, Dodger starting pitcher Don Sutton pitched a complete game for the win.

=== Game 6 ===
October 18, 1977 8:15 pm (ET) at Yankee Stadium in Bronx, New York 55 °F (13 °C), mostly cloudy
| Team | 1 | 2 | 3 | 4 | 5 | 6 | 7 | 8 | 9 | R | H | E |
|---|---|---|---|---|---|---|---|---|---|---|---|---|
| Los Angeles | 2 | 0 | 1 | 0 | 0 | 0 | 0 | 0 | 1 | 4 | 9 | 0 |
| New York | 0 | 2 | 0 | 3 | 2 | 0 | 0 | 1 | X | 8 | 8 | 1 |
WP: Mike Torrez (2–0) LP: Burt Hooton (1–1); Home runs: LAD: Reggie Smith (3); NYY: Chris Chambliss (1), Reggie Jackson 3 (5)

Game 6 shifted the series back to New York, where 56,407 filled Yankee Stadium.

After two infield ground outs by Davey Lopes and Bill Russell, Steve Garvey put the Dodgers on the board with a two-run triple down the right field line off Mike Torrez, scoring Reggie Smith and Ron Cey; both runs were unearned after shortstop Bucky Dent booted Smith's ground ball and Cey walked. New York tied it in the second as Chris Chambliss lifted a 2–1 pitch from starter Burt Hooton into the right center seats after Reggie Jackson walked on four pitches, but the next three batters went down in order. After Lopes and Russell grounded out again in the top of the third, Smith put Los Angeles up 3–2 with his third homer of the Series, pounding a 1–1 pitch well into the right center seats. Cey lined an infield hit to third, knocked down by Graig Nettles, but Garvey flew to center to end the threat.

In the fourth, Dusty Baker flew out and Rick Monday singled to left. Catcher Steve Yeager pulled one over third base, but it kicked out to left fielder Lou Piniella, who gunned out Yeager at second, and Torrez struck out Hooton to strand Monday at third. In the bottom half, catcher Thurman Munson led off and singled to left. On the next pitch, Jackson turned on a fastball and put into the right field seats for a one-run Yankees' lead, which chased Hooton. With Elias Sosa pitching, Chambliss lifted a high fly to shallow left between Russell and Baker that fell for a double, then went to third on Nettles' ground out to second. Piniella made it 5–3 with an unchallenged sacrifice fly to left field. Dent walked and Torrez grounded out to shortstop to end the inning.

In the fifth, Lopes flew out to left, Russell walked, and Smith grounded into a 6-4-3 double play. Mickey Rivers led off the bottom half with a single up the middle. Willie Randolph bunted, but Yeager pounced on it and forced out Rivers at second for a fielder's choice, and Munson hit a low fly to center for the second out. After a throw to first to keep Randolph close, Jackson connected on the first pitch off Sosa, a screaming low line drive into the right field seats to make the score 7–3. Los Angeles manager Tommy Lasorda brought in lefthander Doug Rau to face Chambliss, who grounded out to Garvey at first.

Leading off the bottom of the eighth, Jackson strode to the plate, amid the chants of "REG-GIE, REG-GIE, REG-GIE!", and drove the first Charlie Hough knuckleball he saw 475 feet (145 m) into the center field "batter's eye" (empty blackened bleachers) for an 8–3 lead; he became the first to hit three home runs in a World Series game in 49 years, since Babe Ruth (in 1926 and 1928). With his Game 5 first-pitch homer (in the eighth) and his four-pitch walk in the second inning of Game 6, Jackson homered on his last four swings of the bat in the Series, each off a different Dodger pitcher. The last eight pitches delivered to Jackson in the Series were all productive for the Yankees—the four-pitch walk in the second inning allowed him to score on the Chambliss homer.

The Dodgers pushed across a run in the ninth, but Torrez pitched his second complete game win of the Series. It was the first six-game Series since 1959.

== Composite box score ==
1977 World Series (4–2): New York Yankees (A.L.) over Los Angeles Dodgers (N.L.)

| Team | 1 | 2 | 3 | 4 | 5 | 6 | 7 | 8 | 9 | 10 | 11 | 12 | R | H | E |
|---|---|---|---|---|---|---|---|---|---|---|---|---|---|---|---|
| New York Yankees | 4 | 5 | 0 | 5 | 3 | 2 | 2 | 4 | 0 | 0 | 0 | 1 | 26 | 50 | 3 |
| Los Angeles Dodgers | 7 | 1 | 8 | 4 | 3 | 2 | 0 | 0 | 3 | 0 | 0 | 0 | 28 | 48 | 1 |
Total attendance: 337,708 Average attendance: 56,285; Winning player's share: $27,758 Losing player's share: $20,899

This World Series is notable for being a six-game series in which the winning team was outscored. It happened previously in 1918 and 1959 and later in 1992, 1996, and 2003. Seven-game series winners were outscored in 1957, 1960, 1962, 1964, 1971, 1972, 1973, 1975, 1991, 1997, 2002, and 2025; (equaled in 2016 and 2017).

With complete games pitched consecutively in Games 2 through 6 (all for the winning pitcher), as of 2025, this was the last World Series to be completed without a pitcher recording a save.

== Broadcasting ==
The 1977 World Series was the first World Series televised by the ABC network since 1949 and the first since television of the World Series started in 1947 not to be televised, at least in part, by rival network NBC. NBC had been the exclusive television network of the World Series from 1950 to 1976 and had covered that year's Yankees–Royals and Dodgers–Phillies playoff series that year. As was customary at the time, the competing teams' local flagship stations (WPIX in New York and KTTV in Los Angeles) were allowed to air a simulcast of ABC's national broadcast.

It was also the first time that the participating teams' local announcers were not featured during game play on the network telecast, though the Yankees' Bill White and the Dodgers' Ross Porter did pre-game television features, and White handled the post-game celebration in the Yankee clubhouse after they won the title. White and Porter also split the CBS Radio play-by-play for the World Series.

== Impact and aftermath ==
This World Series cemented Jackson's legacy as a postseason performer, giving him the nickname "Mr. October". Ironically, the Dodgers had had two chances to obtain Jackson: a possible trade with Oakland A's in 1975, and an offer of more money than the Yankees during the 1976 off-season.

Twenty-four years later a similar nickname would be given to another Yankee, shortstop Derek Jeter, after a walk-off home run in Game 4 of the 2001 World Series.

Jackson won the World Series Most Valuable Player Award and Babe Ruth Award. Lyle won the AL Cy Young Award. Nettles and Garvey both won Gold Glove Awards.

The Yankees and Dodgers met again in the 1978, 1981 and 2024 World Series.

Los Angeles became the first metropolitan area to host a World Series and a Super Bowl in the same calendar year. Super Bowl XI was played January 9, 1977 at the Rose Bowl in Pasadena.

After the 1977 World Series, Melissa Ludtke, a reporter for Sports Illustrated, sued MLB Commissioner Bowie Kuhn for having been denied access to the Yankees' clubhouse during the series, asserting that her 14th Amendment right was violated. Ludtke won her case.

== In popular culture ==
The 1977 New York Yankees is one of the key plot points, along with the Son of Sam and the New York City Blackout of 1977, in the movie Summer of Sam directed by Spike Lee.

The 1977 Yankees season, including the World Series, is one of the subjects of Jonathan Mahler's 2005 non-fiction book Ladies and Gentlemen, the Bronx Is Burning, which was subsequently adapted into the 2007 ESPN mini-series The Bronx Is Burning.

== See also ==
- 1977 Japan Series
