= 1978 Kansas City Royals season =

1978 Kansas City Royals
- American League West champions
- League: American League
- Division: West
- Ballpark: Royals Stadium
- City: Kansas City, Missouri
- Record: 92–70 (.568)
- Divisional place: 1st
- Owners: Ewing Kauffman
- General managers: Joe Burke
- Managers: Whitey Herzog (third full season)
- Television: KBMA–TV 41 (Denny Matthews, Steve Shannon, Fred White)
- Radio: WIBW–AM 580; KMBZ–AM 980 (Denny Matthews, Fred White)

The 1978 Kansas City Royals season was their tenth in Major League Baseball. The Royals won their third consecutive American League West title with a record of 92–70. For the third postseason in a row, Kansas City lost to the New York Yankees, falling 3–1 in the ALCS.

== Regular season ==
=== Season standings ===
AL West
Team	W	L	Pct.	GB	Home	Road
Kansas City Royals	92	70	.568	—	56‍–‍25	36‍–‍45
Texas Rangers	87	75	.537	5	52‍–‍30	35‍–‍45
California Angels	87	75	.537	5	50‍–‍31	37‍–‍44
Minnesota Twins	73	89	.451	19	38‍–‍43	35‍–‍46
Chicago White Sox	71	90	.441	20½	38‍–‍42	33‍–‍48
Oakland Athletics	69	93	.426	23	38‍–‍42	31‍–‍51
Seattle Mariners	56	104	.350	35	32‍–‍49	24‍–‍55

=== Record vs. opponents ===
1978 American League record Sources:
Team	BAL	BOS	CAL	CWS	CLE	DET	KC	MIL	MIN	NYY	OAK	SEA	TEX	TOR
Baltimore	—	7–8	4–6	8–1	9–6	7–8	2–8	7–8	5–5	6–9	11–0	9–1	7–4	8–7
Boston	8–7	—	9–2	7–3	7–8	12–3	4–6	10–5	9–2	7–9	5–5	7–3	3–7	11–4
California	6–4	2–9	—	8–7	6–4	4–7	9–6	5–5	12–3	5–5	9–6	9–6	5–10	7–3
Chicago	1–8	3–7	7–8	—	8–2	2–9	8–7	4–7	8–7	1–9	7–8	7–8	11–4	4–6
Cleveland	6–9	8–7	4–6	2–8	—	5–10	5–6	5–10	5–5	6–9	4–6	8–1	1–9	10–4
Detroit	8–7	3–12	7–4	9–2	10–5	—	4–6	7–8	4–6	4–11	6–4	8–2	7–3	9–6
Kansas City	8–2	6–4	6–9	7–8	6–5	6–4	—	6–4	7–8	6–5	10–5	12–3	7–8	5–5
Milwaukee	8–7	5–10	5–5	7–4	10–5	8–7	4–6	—	4–7	10–5	9–1	5–5	6–4	12–3
Minnesota	5–5	2–9	3–12	7–8	5–5	6–4	8–7	7–4	—	3–7	9–6	6–9	6–9	6–4
New York	9–6	9–7	5–5	9–1	9–6	11–4	5–6	5–10	7–3	—	8–2	6–5	6–4	11–4
Oakland	0–11	5–5	6–9	8–7	6–4	4–6	5–10	1–9	6–9	2–8	—	13–2	6–9	7–4
Seattle	1–9	3–7	6–9	8–7	1–8	2–8	3–12	5–5	9–6	5–6	2–13	—	3–12	8–2
Texas	4–7	7–3	10–5	4–11	9–1	3–7	8–7	4–6	9–6	4–6	9–6	12–3	—	4–7
Toronto	7–8	4–11	3–7	6–4	4–10	6–9	5–5	3–12	4–6	4–11	4–7	2–8	7–4	—

=== Notable transactions ===
- April 4, 1978: John Mayberry was purchased from the Royals by the Toronto Blue Jays.
- June 5, 1978: The Royals traded a player to be named later to the San Diego Padres for Steve Hamrick (minors). The Royals completed the deal by sending Gary Lance to the Padres on September 29.
- August 3, 1978: Gerry Ako (minors) and cash were traded by the Royals to the Milwaukee Brewers for Jamie Quirk.

==== Draft picks ====
- June 6, 1978: 1978 Major League Baseball draft
  - Jeff Cornell was drafted by the Royals in the 8th round.
  - Frank Viola was drafted by the Royals in the 16th round, but did not sign.

=== Roster ===
1978 Kansas City Royals
Roster
Pitchers: 29 Doug Bird; 40 Steve Busby; 48 Jim Colborn; 16 Steve Foucault; 38 Rich Gale; 37 Larry Gura; 16 Andy Hassler; 39 Al Hrabosky; 22 Dennis Leonard; 28,31 Randy McGilberry; 23 Steve Mingori; 43 Bill Paschall; 33 Marty Pattin; 34 Paul Splittorff; 35 George Throop	Catchers: 37 Jim Gaudet; 21 Art Kusnyer; 15 Darrell Porter; Infielders: 5 George Brett; 31 Dave Cripe; 8 Pete LaCock; 2 Fred Patek; 10 Jamie Quirk; 1 Jerry Terrell; 30 U L Washington; 12 John Wathan; 20 Frank White	Outfielders: 3 Steve Braun; 18 Al Cowens; 9 Clint Hurdle; 10 Joe Lahoud; 11 Hal McRae; 26 Amos Otis; 25 Tom Poquette; 17 Luis Silverio; 6 Willie Wilson; 19 Joe Zdeb; Other batters: 7 Randy Bass	Manager: 24 Whitey Herzog; Coaches: 14 Steve Boros; 36 Galen Cisco; 4 Chuck Hiller; 27 Charley Lau

== Game log ==
=== Regular season ===
1978 regular season game log: 92–70 (Home: 55–26; Away: 47–34)
April: 14–5 (Home: 8–2; Away: 6–3)

#	Date	Time (CT)	Opponent	Score	Win	Loss	Save	Time of Game	Attendance	Record	Box/ Streak

May: 11–14 (Home: 6–5; Away: 5–9)

#	Date	Time (CT)	Opponent	Score	Win	Loss	Save	Time of Game	Attendance	Record	Box/ Streak

June: 13–17 (Home: 9–7; Away: 4–10)

#	Date	Time (CT)	Opponent	Score	Win	Loss	Save	Time of Game	Attendance	Record	Box/ Streak

July: 20–8 (Home: 13–3; Away: 7–5)

#	Date	Time (CT)	Opponent	Score	Win	Loss	Save	Time of Game	Attendance	Record	Box/ Streak
—	July 11	7:30 p.m. CDT	49th All-Star Game in San Diego, CA								

August: 13–16 (Home: 7–4; Away: 6–12)

#	Date	Time (CT)	Opponent	Score	Win	Loss	Save	Time of Game	Attendance	Record	Box/ Streak

September: 20–10 (Home: 12–5; Away: 8–5)

#	Date	Time (CT)	Opponent	Score	Win	Loss	Save	Time of Game	Attendance	Record	Box/ Streak

October: 1–0 (Home: 1–0; Away: 0–0)

#	Date	Time (CT)	Opponent	Score	Win	Loss	Save	Time of Game	Attendance	Record	Box/ Streak

Legend: = Royals win = Royals loss = Game postponed = Clinched division
Bold = Royals team member

=== Postseason Game log ===
1978 Postseason game log: 1–3 (Home: 1–1; Away: 0–2)
AL Championship Series: vs. New York Yankees 1–3 (Home: 1–1; Away: 0–2)

#	Date	Time (CT)	Opponent	Score	Win	Loss	Save	Time of Game	Attendance	Series	Box/ Streak
1	October 3	7:30 p.m. CDT	Yankees	L 1–7	Beattie (1–0)	**Leonard** (0–1)	Clay (1)	2:57	41,143	NYY 1–0	L1
2	October 4	2:30 p.m. CDT	Yankees	**W** 10–4	**Gura** (1–0)	Figueroa (0–1)	—	2:42	41,158	Tied 1–1	W1
3	October 6	2:30 p.m. CDT	@ Yankees	L 5–6	Gossage (1–0)	**Bird** (0–1)	—	2:13	55,445	NYY 2–1	L1
4	October 7	7:30 p.m. CDT	@ Yankees	L 1–2	Guidry (1–0)	**Leonard** (0–2)	Gossage (1)	2:20	56,356	NYY 3–1	L2

Legend: = Win = Loss
Bold = Royals team member

== Player stats ==
=== Batting ===
==== Starters by position ====
Note: Pos = Position; G = Games played; AB = At bats; H = Hits; Avg. = Batting average; HR = Home runs; RBI = Runs batted in

Pos	Player	G	AB	H	Avg.	HR	RBI
C	Darrell Porter	150	520	138	.265	18	78
1B	Pete LaCock	118	322	95	.295	5	48
2B	Frank White	143	461	127	.275	7	50
3B	George Brett	128	510	150	.294	9	62
SS	Freddie Patek	138	440	109	.248	2	46
LF	Willie Wilson	127	198	43	.217	0	16
CF	Amos Otis	141	486	145	.298	22	96
RF	Al Cowens	132	485	133	.274	5	63
DH	Hal McRae	156	623	170	.273	16	72

==== Other batters ====
Note: G = Games played; AB = At bats; H = Hits; Avg. = Batting average; HR = Home runs; RBI = Runs batted in

Player	G	AB	H	Avg.	HR	RBI
Clint Hurdle	133	417	110	.264	7	56
Tom Poquette	80	204	44	.216	4	30
John Wathan	67	190	57	.300	2	28
Steve Braun	64	137	36	.263	0	14
Jerry Terrell	73	133	27	.203	0	8
U L Washington	69	129	34	.264	0	9
Joe Zdeb	60	127	32	.252	0	11
Jamie Quirk	17	29	6	.207	0	2
Joe Lahoud	13	16	2	.125	0	0
Art Kusnyer	9	13	3	.231	1	2
Dave Cripe	7	13	2	.154	0	1
Luis Silverio	8	11	6	.545	0	3
Jim Gaudet	3	8	0	.000	0	0
Randy Bass	2	2	0	.000	0	0

=== Pitching ===
==== Starting pitchers ====
Note: G = Games pitched; IP = Innings pitched; W = Wins; L = Losses; ERA = Earned run average; SO = Strikeouts

Player	G	IP	W	L	ERA	SO
Dennis Leonard	40	294.2	21	17	3.33	183
Paul Splittorff	39	262.0	19	13	3.40	76
Larry Gura	35	221.2	16	4	2.72	81
Rich Gale	31	192.1	14	8	3.09	88
Andy Hassler	11	58.1	1	4	4.32	26

==== Other pitchers ====
Note: G = Games pitched; IP = Innings pitched; W = Wins; L = Losses; ERA = Earned run average; SO = Strikeouts

Player	G	IP	W	L	ERA	SO
Doug Bird	40	98.2	6	6	5.29	48
Marty Pattin	32	78.2	3	3	3.32	30
Andy Hassler	11	58.1	1	4	4.32	26
Jim Colborn	8	28.1	1	2	4.76	8
Steve Busby	7	21.1	1	0	7.59	10

==== Relief pitchers ====
Note: G = Games pitched; W = Wins; L = Losses; SV = Saves; ERA = Earned run average; SO = Strikeouts

Player	G	W	L	SV	ERA	SO
Al Hrabosky	58	8	7	20	2.88	60
Steve Mingori	45	1	4	7	2.74	28
Randy McGilberry	18	0	1	0	4.21	12
Steve Foucault	3	0	0	0	3.86	0
Bill Paschall	2	0	1	1	3.38	5
George Throop	1	1	0	0	0.00	2

== ALCS ==
=== Game 1 ===
October 3: Royals Stadium

Team	1	2	3	4	5	6	7	8	9	R	H	E
New York	0	1	1	0	2	0	0	3	0	7	16	0
Kansas City	0	0	0	0	0	1	0	0	0	1	2	2
W: Jim Beattie (1–0) L: Dennis Leonard (0–1) S: Ken Clay (1)
HRs: NYY – Reggie Jackson (1)

=== Game 2 ===
October 4: Royals Stadium

Team	1	2	3	4	5	6	7	8	9	R	H	E
New York	0	0	0	0	0	0	2	2	0	4	12	1
Kansas City	1	4	0	0	0	0	3	2	X	10	16	1
W: Larry Gura (1–0) L: Ed Figueroa (0–1)
HRs: KCR – Freddie Patek (1)

=== Game 3 ===
October 6: Yankee Stadium

Team	1	2	3	4	5	6	7	8	9	R	H	E
Kansas City	1	0	1	0	1	0	0	2	0	5	10	1
New York	0	1	0	2	0	1	0	2	X	6	10	0
W: Goose Gossage (1–0) L: Doug Bird (0–1)
HRs: KCR – George Brett 3 (3) NYY – Reggie Jackson (2) Thurman Munson (1)

=== Game 4 ===
October 7: Yankee Stadium

Team	1	2	3	4	5	6	7	8	9	R	H	E
Kansas City	1	0	0	0	0	0	0	0	0	1	7	0
New York	0	1	0	0	0	1	0	0	X	2	4	0
W: Ron Guidry (1–0) L: Dennis Leonard (0–2) S: Goose Gossage (1)
HRs: NYY – Graig Nettles (1) Roy White (1)

== Farm system ==
Level	Team	League	Manager
AAA	Omaha Royals	American Association	John Sullivan
AA	Jacksonville Suns	Southern League	Gordon Mackenzie
A	Fort Myers Royals	Florida State League	Gene Lamont
Rookie	GCL Royals	Gulf Coast League	José Martínez

LEAGUE CHAMPIONS: Omaha
