= 1977 Kansas City Royals season =

1977 Kansas City Royals
- American League West champions
- League: American League
- Division: West
- Ballpark: Royals Stadium
- City: Kansas City, Missouri
- Record: 102–60 (.630)
- Divisional place: 1st
- Owners: Ewing Kauffman
- General managers: Joe Burke
- Managers: Whitey Herzog (second full season)
- Television: KBMA–TV 41 (Denny Matthews, Fred White)
- Radio: WIBW–AM 580; KMBZ–AM 980 (Denny Matthews, Fred White)

The 1977 Kansas City Royals season was their ninth in Major League Baseball. The Royals' franchise-best 102–60 record led the majors and Kansas City won its second consecutive American League West title. Once again, the Royals lost to the New York Yankees in the postseason, falling 3–2 in the ALCS. Hal McRae led the American League in doubles, with 54. Al Cowens set a franchise single-season record with 112 runs batted in.

== Offseason ==
- November 5, 1976: Ruppert Jones was drafted from the Royals by the Seattle Mariners with the first pick in the 1976 Major League Baseball expansion draft.
- December 6, 1976: Jamie Quirk, Jim Wohlford and a player to be named later were traded by the Kansas City Royals to the Milwaukee Brewers for Jim Colborn and Darrell Porter. The Kansas City Royals completed the trade by sending Bob McClure to the Brewers on March 15, 1977.
- December 7, 1976: Frank Ortenzio was traded by the Royals to the Montreal Expos for Rudy Kinard (minors).

== Regular season ==
=== Season standings ===
AL West
Team	W	L	Pct.	GB	Home	Road
Kansas City Royals	102	60	.630	—	55‍–‍26	47‍–‍34
Texas Rangers	94	68	.580	8	44‍–‍37	50‍–‍31
Chicago White Sox	90	72	.556	12	48‍–‍33	42‍–‍39
Minnesota Twins	84	77	.522	17½	48‍–‍32	36‍–‍45
California Angels	74	88	.457	28	39‍–‍42	35‍–‍46
Seattle Mariners	64	98	.395	38	29‍–‍52	35‍–‍46
Oakland Athletics	63	98	.391	38½	35‍–‍46	28‍–‍52

=== Record vs. opponents ===
1977 American League record Sources:
Team	BAL	BOS	CAL	CWS	CLE	DET	KC	MIL	MIN	NYY	OAK	SEA	TEX	TOR
Baltimore	—	6–8	5–6	5–5	11–4	12–3	4–7	11–4	6–4	8–7	8–2	7–3	4–6	10–5
Boston	8–6	—	7–3	3–7	8–7	9–6	5–5	9–6	4–6	8–7	8–3	10–1	6–4	12–3
California	6–5	3–7	—	8–7	6–4	4–6	6–9	5–5	7–8	4–7	5–10	9–6	5–10	6–4
Chicago	5–5	7–3	7–8	—	6–4	4–6	8–7	6–5	10–5	3–7	10–5	10–5	6–9	8–3
Cleveland	4–11	7–8	4–6	4–6	—	8–7	3–7	11–4	2–9	3–12	7–3	7–3	2–9	9–5
Detroit	3–12	6–9	6–4	6–4	7–8	—	3–8	10–5	5–5	6–9	5–5	5–6	2–8	10–5
Kansas City	7–4	5–5	9–6	7–8	7–3	8–3	—	8–2	10–5	5–5	9–6	11–4	8–7	8–2
Milwaukee	4–11	6–9	5–5	5–6	4–11	5–10	2–8	—	3–8	8–7	5–5	7–3	5–5	8–7
Minnesota	4–6	6–4	8–7	5–10	9–2	5–5	5–10	8–3	—	2–8	8–6	7–8	8–7	9–1
New York	7–8	7–8	7–4	7–3	12–3	9–6	5–5	7–8	8–2	—	9–2	6–4	7–3	9–6
Oakland	2–8	3–8	10–5	5–10	3–7	5–5	6–9	5–5	6–8	2–9	—	7–8	2–13	7–3
Seattle	3–7	1–10	6–9	5–10	3–7	6–5	4–11	3–7	8–7	4–6	8–7	—	9–6	4–6
Texas	6–4	4–6	10–5	9–6	9–2	8–2	7–8	5–5	7–8	3–7	13–2	6–9	—	7–4
Toronto	5–10	3–12	4–6	3–8	5–9	5–10	2–8	7–8	1–9	6–9	3–7	6–4	4–7	—

=== Opening Day starters ===
- George Brett
- Al Cowens
- Pete LaCock
- John Mayberry
- Hal McRae
- Amos Otis
- Freddie Patek
- Darrell Porter
- Paul Splittorff
- Frank White

=== Notable transactions ===
- May 27, 1977: Tim Ireland was signed as a free agent by the Royals.

=== Roster ===
1977 Kansas City Royals
Roster
Pitchers: 29 Doug Bird; 48 Jim Colborn; 37 Larry Gura; 42 Tom Hall; 16 Andy Hassler; 39 Gary Lance; 22 Dennis Leonard; 17 Mark Littell; 31 Randy McGilberry; 23 Steve Mingori; 33 Marty Pattin; 34 Paul Splittorff; 35 George Throop	Catchers: 21 Buck Martinez; 15 Darrell Porter; 12 John Wathan; Infielders: 5 George Brett; 6 Bob Heise; 8 Pete LaCock; 7 John Mayberry; 3 Dave Nelson; 2 Freddie Patek; 1 Cookie Rojas; 30 U L Washington; 20 Frank White	Outfielders: 18 Al Cowens; 9 Clint Hurdle; 10 Joe Lahoud; 11 Hal McRae; 26 Amos Otis; 25 Tom Poquette; 32 Willie Wilson; 19 Joe Zdeb	Manager: 24 Whitey Herzog; Coaches: 14 Steve Boros; 36 Galen Cisco; 4 Chuck Hiller; 27 Charley Lau

== Game log ==
=== Regular season ===
1977 regular season game log: 102–60 (Home: 55–26; Away: 47–34)
April: 11–9 (Home: 5–7; Away: 6–2)

#	Date	Time (CT)	Opponent	Score	Win	Loss	Save	Time of Game	Attendance	Record	Box/ Streak
4	April 11	7:40 p.m. CST	Yankees	5–4 (13)	**Littell** (1–0)	Tidrow (0–1)	—	3:34	39,460	4–0	W4
5	April 13	7:30 p.m. CST	Yankees	3–5	Guidry (1–0)	**Hassler** (0–1)	—	2:58	20,089	4–1	L1

May: 10–15 (Home: 6–8; Away: 4–7)

#	Date	Time (CT)	Opponent	Score	Win	Loss	Save	Time of Game	Attendance	Record	Box/ Streak
39 (1)	May 25	4:34 p.m. CDT	@ Orioles	4–1	**Splittorff** (3–4)	Grimsley (4–3)	**Gura** (4)	2:23	—	19–20	W1
40 (2)	May 25	7:25 p.m. CDT	@ Orioles	2–7	D. Martínez (3–2)	**Colburn** (5–5)	—	2:56	11,388	19–21	L1

June: 17–12 (Home: 8–5; Away: 9–7)

#	Date	Time (CT)	Opponent	Score	Win	Loss	Save	Time of Game	Attendance	Record	Box/ Streak
46	June 3	7:30 p.m. CDT	Orioles	6–7	Grimsley (6–3)	**Bird** (2–1)	T. Martinez (1)	3:00	21,878	22–24	L1
47 (1)	June 4	5:00 p.m. CDT	Orioles	4–5	D. Martínez (4–2)	**Colburn** (6–6)	—	2:21	—	22–25	L2
48 (2)	June 4	7:56 p.m. CDT	Orioles	14–13 (10)	**Gura** (3–1)	Flanagan (1–5)	—	3:36	36,931	23–25	W1
49	June 5	1:30 p.m. CDT	Orioles	4–3	**Hassler** (2–1)	Palmer (7–5)	**Gura** (5)	2:32	16,559	24–25	W2
57	June 13	7:00 p.m. CDT	@ Yankees	8–3	**Splittorff** (5–4)	Torrez (7–5)	**Mingori** (2)	2:25	22,420	28–29	W1
58	June 14	7:00 p.m. CDT	@ Yankees	2–4	Gullett (6–2)	**Hassler** (3–2)	—	2:19	19,559	28–30	L1
59	June 16	7:00 p.m. CDT	@ Yankees	0–7	Guidry (5–2)	**Leonard** (4–7)	—	2:02	26,391	28–31	L2

July: 18–8 (Home: 10–1; Away: 8–7)

#	Date	Time (CT)	Opponent	Score	Win	Loss	Save	Time of Game	Attendance	Record	Box/ Streak
87	July 15	7:30 p.m. CDT	Yankees	7–4	**Splittorff** (7–5)	Guidry (6–5)	**Mingori** (3)	2:26	36,743	49–38	W4
88	July 16	7:30 p.m. CDT	Yankees	5–1	**Leonard** (9–9)	Torrez (8–9)	—	2:26	40,059	50–38	W5
89	July 17	1:30 p.m. CDT	Yankees	8–4	**Hassler** (6–2)	Clay (0–3)	—	2:26	38,699	51–38	W6
—	July 19	7:15 p.m. CDT	48th All-Star Game in Bronx, NY								
93	July 24	1:00 p.m. CDT	@ Yankees	1–3	Gullett (9–3)	**Hassler** (6–3)	Tidrow (4)	2:30	41,060	53–40	L2
—	July 25	7:00 p.m. CDT	@ Yankees	Postponed (rain); Makeup: August 29							

August: 20–11 (Home: 11–3; Away: 9–8)

#	Date	Time (CT)	Opponent	Score	Win	Loss	Save	Time of Game	Attendance	Record	Box/ Streak
121	August 22	7:30 p.m. CDT	Orioles	8–7	**Mingori** (1–3)	T. Martinez (4–1)	—	2:49	36,328	70–51	W6
122	August 23	7:30 p.m. CDT	Orioles	5–2	**Colburn** (14–12)	Flanagan (9–10)	**Gura** (9)	2:36	27,602	71–51	W7
125	August 26	6:38 p.m. CDT	@ Orioles	3–2	**Leonard** (14–10)	Palmer (13–11)	—	2:15	21,511	74–51	W10
126	August 27	6:33 p.m. CDT	@ Orioles	2–4	Flanagan (10–10)	**Colburn** (14–13)	D. Martínez (4)	2:16	17,074	74–52	L1
127	August 28	1:08 p.m. CDT	@ Orioles	5–0	**Hassler** (7–5)	Grimsley (12–7)	**Bird** (8)	2:19	15,764	75–52	W1
128	August 29	1:00 p.m. CDT	@ Yankees	3–5	Lyle (10–4)	**Mingori** (1–4)	—	2:29	31,269	75–53	L1

September: 25–5 (Home: 12–1; Away: 13–4)

#	Date	Time (CT)	Opponent	Score	Win	Loss	Save	Time of Game	Attendance	Record	Box/ Streak

October: 1–1 (Home: 1–1; Away: 0–0)

#	Date	Time (CT)	Opponent	Score	Win	Loss	Save	Time of Game	Attendance	Record	Box/ Streak

Legend: = Royals win = Royals loss = Game postponed = Clinched division
Bold = Royals team member

=== Detailed records ===
American League
Opponent	Home	Away	Total	Pct.	Runs scored	Runs allowed
AL East
Baltimore Orioles	4–2	3–2	7–4	0.636	57	51
New York Yankees	4–1	1–4	5–5	0.500	42	40
Div Total	8–3	4–6	12–9	0.571	99	91
AL West
**Kansas City Royals**	—	—	—	—	—	—
Div Total	0–0	0–0	0–0	–	0	0
Season Total	8–3	4–6	12–9	0.571	99	91

Month	Games	Won	Lost	Win %	RS	RA
Total

	Games	Won	Lost	Win %	RS	RA
Home
Away
Total

=== Postseason Game log ===
1977 Postseason game log: 2–3 (Home: 1–2; Away: 1–1)
AL Championship Series: vs. New York Yankees 2–3 (Home: 1–2; Away: 1–1)

#	Date	Time (CT)	Opponent	Score	Win	Loss	Save	Time of Game	Attendance	Series	Box/ Streak
1	October 5	2:15 p.m. CDT	@ Yankees	7–2	**Splittorff** (1–0)	Gullett (0–1)	—	2:40	54,930	KCA 1–0	W1
2	October 6	7:15 p.m. CDT	@ Yankees	2–6	Guidry (1–0)	**Hassler** (0–1)	—	2:58	56,230	TIE 1–1	L1
3	October 7	7:15 p.m. CDT	Yankees	6–2	**Leonard** (1–0)	Torrez (0–1)	—	2:19	41,285	KCA 2–1	W1
4	October 8	12:15 p.m. CDT	Yankees	4–6	Lyle (1–0)	**Gura** (0–1)	—	3:08	41,135	TIE 2–2	L1
5	October 9	7:15 p.m. CDT	Yankees	3–5	Lyle (2–0)	**Leonard** (1–1)	—	3:04	41,133	NYA 3–2	L2

Legend: = Win = Loss
Bold = Royals team member

== Starting Lineups ==
=== Regular Season ===
==== Batting Order ====
1977 Regular Season Batting Order game log
April

#	Date	Opponent	1st	2nd	3rd	4th	5th	6th	7th	8th	9th
4	April 11	NYY	#5; Brett (3B)	#11; McRae (DH)	#7; Mayberry (1B)	#26; Otis (CF)	#15; Porter (C)	#18; Cowens (RF)	#8; LaCock (LF)	#2; Patek (SS)	#20; White (2B)
5	April 13	NYY	#5; Brett (3B)	#11; McRae (DH)	#7; Mayberry (1B)	#26; Otis (CF)	#15; Porter (C)	#18; Cowens (RF)	#8; LaCock (LF)	#2; Patek (SS)	#20; White (2B)

May

#	Date	Opponent	1st	2nd	3rd	4th	5th	6th	7th	8th	9th
39	May 25	@ BAL									
40	May 25	@ BAL									

June

#	Date	Opponent	1st	2nd	3rd	4th	5th	6th	7th	8th	9th
46	June 3	BAL									
47	June 4	BAL									
48	June 4	BAL									
49	June 5	BAL									
57	June 13	@ NYY	#25; Poquette (RF)	#11; McRae (LF)	#5; Brett (3B)	#7; Mayberry (1B)	#18; Cowens (CF)	#8; LaCock (DH)	#15; Porter (C)	#2; Patek (SS)	#20; White (2B)
58	June 14	@ NYY	#2; Patek (SS)	#5; Brett (3B)	#11; McRae (DH)	#7; Mayberry (1B)	#18; Cowens (RF)	#26; Otis (CF)	#19; Zdeb (LF)	#15; Porter (C)	#6; Heise (2B)
59	June 16	@ NYY	#2; Patek (SS)	#5; Brett (3B)	#11; McRae (DH)	#18; Cowens (RF)	#7; Mayberry (1B)	#26; Otis (CF)	#1; Rojas (2B)	#15; Porter (C)	#19; Zdeb (LF)

July

#	Date	Opponent	1st	2nd	3rd	4th	5th	6th	7th	8th	9th
87	July 15	NYY	#5; Brett (3B)	#11; McRae (DH)	#26; Otis (CF)	#18; Cowens (RF)	#7; Mayberry (1B)	#19; Zdeb (LF)	#15; Porter (C)	#2; Patek (SS)	#20; White (2B)
88	July 16	NYY	#5; Brett (3B)	#11; McRae (LF)	#8; LaCock (DH)	#18; Cowens (CF)	#7; Mayberry (1B)	#25; Poquette (RF)	#15; Porter (C)	#2; Patek (SS)	#20; White (2B)
89	July 17	NYY	#5; Brett (3B)	#11; McRae (DH)	#8; LaCock (1B)	#18; Cowens (RF)	#10; Lahoud (LF)	#26; Otis (CF)	#15; Porter (C)	#2; Patek (SS)	#20; White (2B)
93	July 24	@ NYY	#5; Brett (3B)	#11; McRae (DH)	#26; Otis (CF)	#18; Cowens (RF)	#7; Mayberry (1B)	#19; Zdeb (LF)	#15; Porter (C)	#2; Patek (SS)	#20; White (2B)

August

#	Date	Opponent	1st	2nd	3rd	4th	5th	6th	7th	8th	9th
121	August 22	BAL									
122	August 23	BAL									
125	August 26	@ BAL									
126	August 27	@ BAL									
127	August 28	@ BAL									
128	August 29	@ NYY	#25; Poquette (LF)	#22; Leonard (DH)	#5; Brett (3B)	#48; Coburn (RF)	#16; Hassler (1B)	#15; Porter (C)	#26; Otis (CF)	#2; Patek (SS)	#20; White (2B)

September

#	Date	Opponent	1st	2nd	3rd	4th	5th	6th	7th	8th	9th

October

#	Date	Opponent	1st	2nd	3rd	4th	5th	6th	7th	8th	9th

==== Defensive Lineup ====
1977 Regular Season Defensive Lineup game log
April

#	Date	Opponent	C	1B	2B	3B	SS	LF	CF	RF	P
4	April 11	NYY	#15; Porter	#7; Mayberry	#20; White	#5; Brett	#2; Patek	#8; LaCock	#26; Otis	#18; Cowens	#34; Splittorff
5	April 13	NYY	#15; Porter	#7; Mayberry	#20; White	#5; Brett	#2; Patek	#8; LaCock	#26; Otis	#18; Cowens	#16; Hassler

May

#	Date	Opponent	C	1B	2B	3B	SS	LF	CF	RF	P
39	May 25	@ BAL									
40	May 25	@ BAL									

June

#	Date	Opponent	C	1B	2B	3B	SS	LF	CF	RF	P
46	June 3	BAL									
47	June 4	BAL									
48	June 4	BAL									
49	June 5	BAL									
57	June 13	@ NYY	#15; Porter	#7; Mayberry	#20; White	#5; Brett	#2; Patek	#11; McRae	#18; Cowens	#25; Poquette	#34; Splittorff
58	June 14	@ NYY	#15; Porter	#7; Mayberry	#6; Heise	#5; Brett	#2; Patek	#19; Zdeb	#26; Otis	#18; Cowens	#16; Hassler
59	June 16	@ NYY	#15; Porter	#7; Mayberry	#1; Rojas	#5; Brett	#2; Patek	#19; Zdeb	#26; Otis	#18; Cowens	#22; Leonard

July

#	Date	Opponent	C	1B	2B	3B	SS	LF	CF	RF	P
87	July 15	NYY	#15; Porter	#7; Mayberry	#20; White	#5; Brett	#2; Patek	#19; Zdeb	#26; Otis	#18; Cowens	#34; Splittorff
88	July 16	NYY	#15; Porter	#7; Mayberry	#20; White	#5; Brett	#2; Patek	#11; McRae	#18; Cowens	#25; Poquette	#22; Leonard
89	July 17	NYY	#15; Porter	#8; LaCock	#20; White	#5; Brett	#2; Patek	#10; Lahoud	#26; Otis	#18; Cowens	#16; Hassler
93	July 24	@ NYY	#15; Porter	#7; Mayberry	#20; White	#5; Brett	#2; Patek	#19; Zdeb	#26; Otis	#18; Cowens	#16; Hassler

August

#	Date	Opponent	C	1B	2B	3B	SS	LF	CF	RF	P
121	August 22	BAL									
122	August 23	BAL									
125	August 26	@ BAL									
126	August 27	@ BAL									
127	August 28	@ BAL									
128	August 29	@ NYY	#15; Porter	#16; Hassler	#20; White	#5; Brett	#2; Patek	#25; Poquette	#26; Otis	#48; Colburn	#34; Splittorff

September

#	Date	Opponent	C	1B	2B	3B	SS	LF	CF	RF	P

October

#	Date	Opponent	C	1B	2B	3B	SS	LF	CF	RF	P

=== Postseason ===
==== Batting Order ====
1977 Postseason Batting Order game log
AL Championship Series: vs. New York Yankees

#	Date	Opponent	1st	2nd	3rd	4th	5th	6th	7th	8th	9th
1	October 5	@ NYY	#2; Patek (SS)	#11; McRae (DH)	#5; Brett (3B)	#18; Cowens (RF)	#26; Otis (CF)	#7; Mayberry (1B)	#19; Zdeb (LF)	#15; Porter (C)	#20; White (2B)
2	October 6	@ NYY	#2; Patek (SS)	#11; McRae (DH)	#5; Brett (3B)	#18; Cowens (RF)	#26; Otis (CF)	#7; Mayberry (1B)	#19; Zdeb (LF)	#15; Porter (C)	#20; White (2B)
3	October 7	NYY	#25; Poquette (RF)	#11; McRae (LF)	#5; Brett (3B)	#18; Cowens (CF)	#7; Mayberry (1B)	#10; Lahoud (DH)	#15; Porter (C)	#2; Patek (SS)	#20; White (2B)
4	October 8	NYY	#25; Poquette (LF)	#11; McRae (DH)	#5; Brett (3B)	#18; Cowens (RF)	#7; Mayberry (1B)	#15; Porter (C)	#26; Otis (CF)	#2; Patek (SS)	#20; White (2B)
5	October 9	NYY	#2; Patek (SS)	#11; McRae (LF)	#5; Brett (3B)	#18; Cowens (RF)	#26; Otis (CF)	#12; Wathan (1B)	#1; Rojas (DH)	#15; Porter (C)	#20; White (2B)

==== Defensive Lineup ====
1977 Postseason Defensive Lineup game log
AL Championship Series: vs. New York Yankees

#	Date	Opponent	C	1B	2B	3B	SS	LF	CF	RF	P
1	October 5	@ NYY	#15; Porter	#7; Mayberry	#20; White	#5; Brett	#2; Patek	#19; Zdeb	#26; Otis	#18; Cowens	#34; Splittorff
2	October 6	@ NYY	#15; Porter	#7; Mayberry	#20; White	#5; Brett	#2; Patek	#19; Zdeb	#26; Otis	#18; Cowens	#16; Hassler
3	October 7	NYY	#15; Porter	#7; Mayberry	#20; White	#5; Brett	#2; Patek	#11; McRae	#18; Cowens	#25; Poquette	#22; Leonard
4	October 8	NYY	#15; Porter	#7; Mayberry	#20; White	#5; Brett	#2; Patek	#25; Poquette	#26; Otis	#18; Cowens	#37; Gura
5	October 9	NYY	#15; Porter	#12; Wathan	#20; White	#5; Brett	#2; Patek	#11; McRae	#26; Otis	#18; Cowens	#34; Splittorff

== Game Umpires ==
=== Regular Season ===
1977 Regular Season Umpire game log
April

#	Date	Opponent	HP	1B	2B	3B
4	April 11	NYY	Al Clark	Jerry Neudecker (crew chief)	Art Frantz	Nick Bremigan
5	April 13	NYY	Jerry Neudecker (crew chief)	Art Frantz	Nick Bremigan	Al Clark

May

#	Date	Opponent	HP	1B	2B	3B
39	May 25	@ BAL	Nestor Chylak (crew chief)	Steve Palermo	Joe Brinkman	Rich Garcia
40	May 25	@ BAL	Steve Palermo	Joe Brinkman	Rich Garcia	Nestor Chylak (crew chief)

June

#	Date	Opponent	HP	1B	2B	3B
46	June 3	BAL	Dale Ford	Lou DiMuro (crew chief)	Bill Deegan	Jim McKean
47	June 4	BAL	Lou DiMuro (crew chief)	Bill Deegan	Jim McKean	Dale Ford
48	June 4	BAL	Bill Deegan	Jim McKean	Dale Ford	Lou DiMuro (crew chief)
49	June 5	BAL	Jim McKean|	Dale Ford	Lou DiMuro (crew chief)	Bill Deegan
57	June 13	@ NYY	Bill Haller (crew chief)	Ron Luciano	Bill Kunkel	Ken Kaiser
58	June 14	@ NYY	Ron Luciano	Bill Kunkel	Ken Kaiser	Bill Haller (crew chief)
59	June 16	@ NYY	Bill Kunkel	Ken Kaiser	Bill Haller (crew chief)	Ron Luciano

July

#	Date	Opponent	HP	1B	2B	3B
87	July 15	NYY	Vic Voltaggio	Marty Springstead (crew chief)	Larry Barnett	Jim Evans
88	July 16	NYY	Marty Springstead (crew chief)	Larry Barnett	Jim Evans	Vic Voltaggio
89	July 17	NYY	Larry Barnett	Jim Evans	Vic Voltaggio	Marty Springstead (crew chief)
93	July 24	@ NYY	Steve Palermo	Joe Brinkman	Rich Garcia	Nestor Chylak (crew chief)

August

#	Date	Opponent	HP	1B	2B	3B
121	August 22	BAL	Ron Luciano	Bill Haller (crew chief)	Mike Reilly	Bill Kunkel
122	August 23	BAL	Bill Haller (crew chief)	Mike Reilly	Bill Kunkel	Ron Luciano
125	August 26	@ BAL	George Maloney	Ken Kaiser	Greg Kosc	Russ Goetz (crew chief)
126	August 27	@ BAL	Ken Kaiser	Greg Kosc	Russ Goetz (crew chief)	George Maloney
127	August 28	@ BAL	Greg Kosc	Russ Goetz (crew chief)	George Maloney	Ken Kaiser
128	August 29	@ NYY	Lou DiMuro (crew chief)	Jim McKean	Bill Deegan	Fred Spenn

September

#	Date	Opponent	HP	1B	2B	3B

October

#	Date	Opponent	HP	1B	2B	3B

=== Postseason ===
1977 Postseason Umpire game log
AL Championship Series: vs. New York Yankees

#	Date	Opponent	HP	1B	2B	3B	LF	RF
1	October 5	@ NYY	Jerry Neudecker (crew chief)	Russ Goetz	Jim McKean	Marty Springstead	Nick Bremigan	Bill Deegan
2	October 6	@ NYY	Russ Goetz	Jim McKean	Marty Springstead	Nick Bremigan	Bill Deegan	Jerry Neudecker (crew chief)
3	October 7	NYY	Jim McKean	Marty Springstead	Nick Bremigan	Bill Deegan	Jerry Neudecker (crew chief)	Russ Goetz
4	October 8	NYY	Marty Springstead	Nick Bremigan	Bill Deegan	Jerry Neudecker (crew chief)	Russ Goetz	Jim McKean
5	October 9	NYY	Nick Bremigan	Bill Deegan	Jerry Neudecker (crew chief)	Marty Springstead	Russ Goetz	Jim McKean

== Player stats ==
= Indicates team leader

=== Batting ===
==== Starters by position ====
Note: Pos = Position; G = Games played; AB = At bats; H = Hits; Avg. = Batting average; HR = Home runs; RBI = Runs batted in

Pos	Player	G	AB	H	Avg.	HR	RBI
C	Darrell Porter	130	425	117	.275	16	60
1B	John Mayberry	153	543	125	.230	23	82
2B	Frank White	152	474	116	.245	5	50
3B	George Brett	139	564	176	.312	22	88
SS	Freddie Patek	154	497	130	.262	5	60
LF	Tom Poquette	106	342	100	.292	2	33
CF	Amos Otis	142	478	120	.251	17	78
RF	Al Cowens	162	606	189	.312	23	112
DH	Hal McRae	162	641	191	.298	21	92

==== Other batters ====
Note: G = Games played; AB = At bats; H = Hits; Avg. = Batting average; HR = Home runs; RBI = Runs batted in

Player	G	AB	H	Avg.	HR	RBI
Pete LaCock	88	218	66	.303	3	29
Joe Zdeb	105	195	58	.297	2	23
Cookie Rojas	64	156	39	.250	0	10
John Wathan	55	119	39	.328	2	21
Buck Martinez	29	80	18	.225	1	9
Joe Lahoud	34	65	17	.262	2	8
Bob Heise	54	62	16	.258	0	5
Dave Nelson	27	48	9	.188	0	4
Willie Wilson	13	34	11	.324	0	1
U L Washington	10	20	4	.200	0	1
Clint Hurdle	9	26	8	.308	2	7

=== Pitching ===
==== Starting pitchers ====
Note: G = Games pitched; IP = Innings pitched; W = Wins; L = Losses; ERA = Earned run average; SO = Strikeouts

Player	G	IP	W	L	ERA	SO
Dennis Leonard	38	292.2	20	12	3.04	244
Jim Colborn	36	239.0	18	14	3.62	103
Paul Splittorff	37	229.0	16	6	3.69	99
Andy Hassler	29	156.1	9	6	4.20	83

==== Other pitchers ====
Note: G = Games pitched; IP = Innings pitched; W = Wins; L = Losses; ERA = Earned run average; SO = Strikeouts

Player	G	IP	W	L	ERA	SO
Marty Pattin	31	128.1	10	13	3.58	55

==== Relief pitchers ====
Note: G = Games pitched; W = Wins; L = Losses; SV = Saves; ERA = Earned run average; SO = Strikeouts

Player	G	W	L	SV	ERA	SO
Doug Bird	53	11	4	14	3.88	83
Larry Gura	52	8	5	10	3.13	46
Mark Littell	48	8	4	12	3.58	55
Steve Mingori	43	2	4	4	3.09	19
Tom Hall	6	0	0	0	3.52	10
George Throop	4	0	0	1	3.38	1
Randy McGilberry	3	0	1	0	5.14	1
Gary Lance	1	0	1	0	4.50	0

== Other events ==
Before they were to play a game on June 12 against the Milwaukee Brewers at Milwaukee County Stadium, thieves stole gloves and uniforms belonging to Royals players. Due to this, all but seven Kansas City Royals players had to wear Milwaukee road uniforms for the game played that day.

== ALCS ==
=== Game 1 ===
October 5: Yankee Stadium, New York City

Team	1	2	3	4	5	6	7	8	9	R	H	E
Kansas City	2	2	2	0	0	0	0	1	0	7	9	0
New York	0	0	2	0	0	0	0	0	0	2	9	0
W: Paul Splittorff (1–0) L: Don Gullett (0–1)
HRs: KC – Hal McRae (1), John Mayberry (1), Al Cowens (1) NYY – Thurman Munson (1)

=== Game 2 ===
October 6: Yankee Stadium, New York City

Team	1	2	3	4	5	6	7	8	9	R	H	E
Kansas City	0	0	1	0	0	1	0	0	0	2	3	1
New York	0	0	0	0	2	3	0	1	X	6	10	0
W: Ron Guidry (1–0) L: Andy Hassler (0–1)
HRs: KC – none; NYY – Cliff Johnson (1)

=== Game 3 ===
October 7: Royals Stadium, Kansas City, Missouri

Team	1	2	3	4	5	6	7	8	9	R	H	E
New York	0	0	0	0	1	0	0	0	1	2	4	1
Kansas City	0	1	1	0	1	2	0	1	X	6	12	1
W: Dennis Leonard (1–0) L: Mike Torrez (0–1)
HRs: NYY – none; KC – none

=== Game 4 ===
October 8: Royals Stadium, Kansas City, Missouri

Team	1	2	3	4	5	6	7	8	9	R	H	E
New York	1	2	1	1	0	0	0	0	1	6	13	0
Kansas City	0	0	2	2	0	0	0	0	0	4	8	2
W: Sparky Lyle (1–0) L: Larry Gura (0–1)
HRs: NYY – none; KC – none

=== Game 5 ===
October 9: Royals Stadium, Kansas City, Missouri

Team	1	2	3	4	5	6	7	8	9	R	H	E
New York	0	0	1	0	0	0	0	1	3	5	10	0
Kansas City	2	0	1	0	0	0	0	0	0	3	10	1
W: Sparky Lyle (2–0) L: Dennis Leonard (1–1)
HRs: NYY – none; KC – none

== Farm system ==
Level	Team	League	Manager
AAA	Omaha Royals	American Association	John Sullivan
AA	Jacksonville Suns	Southern League	Gordon Mackenzie
A	Daytona Beach Islanders	Florida State League	José Martínez
Rookie	GCL Royals	Gulf Coast League	Bill Scripture
