= Whitey Herzog =

American baseball player and manager (1931–2024)

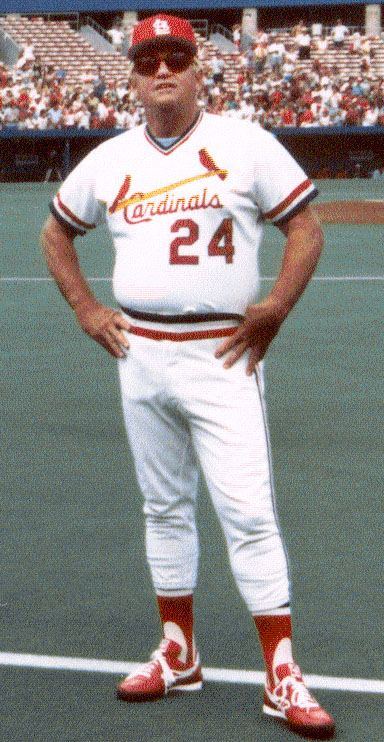
- Herzog as manager of the Cardinals in 1987
- Outfielder / Manager
- Born: November 9, 1931; New Athens, Illinois, U.S.
- Died: April 15, 2024 (aged 92); St. Louis, Missouri, U.S.
- Batted: Left Threw: Left

MLB debut
- April 17, 1956, for the Washington Senators

Last MLB appearance
- September 28, 1963, for the Detroit Tigers

MLB statistics
- Batting average: .257
- Home runs: 25
- Runs batted in: 172
- Managerial record: 1,281–1,125–3
- Winning %: .532
- Stats at Baseball Reference
- Managerial record at Baseball Reference

Teams
- As player: Washington Senators (1956–1958); Kansas City Athletics (1958–1960); Baltimore Orioles (1961–1962); Detroit Tigers (1963); As manager: Texas Rangers (1973); California Angels (1974); Kansas City Royals (1975–1979); St. Louis Cardinals (1980, 1981–1990)

Career highlights and awards
- World Series champion (1982); NL Manager of the Year (1985); St. Louis Cardinals No. 24 retired; Kansas City Royals Hall of Fame; St. Louis Cardinals Hall of Fame

Member of the National

Baseball Hall of Fame
- Induction: 2010
- Vote: 87.5%
- Election method: Veterans Committee

Dorrel Norman Elvert "Whitey" Herzog (/ˈhɜːrzɒɡ/; November 9, 1931 – April 15, 2024) was an American professional baseball outfielder and manager, remembered for his Major League Baseball (MLB) managerial career.

Herzog made his major league debut as a player in 1956 with the Washington Senators. After his playing career ended in 1963, Herzog went on to perform a variety of roles in Major League Baseball, including scout, manager, coach, general manager, and farm system director.

As a scout and farm system director, Herzog helped the New York Mets win the 1969 World Series. As a big-league manager, he led the Kansas City Royals to three consecutive playoff appearances from 1976 to 1978. Hired by Gussie Busch in 1980 to helm the St. Louis Cardinals, the team made three World Series appearances, winning the 1982 World Series over the Milwaukee Brewers and falling in 1985 and 1987.

Herzog was inducted into the Baseball Hall of Fame on July 25, 2010, and was inducted into the St. Louis Cardinals Hall of Fame Museum on August 16, 2014.

== Early life ==
Herzog was born on November 9, 1931, in New Athens, Illinois, to Edgar and Lietta Herzog. His father worked at a brewery and his mother at a shoe factory. Whitey attended New Athens High School where he played basketball and baseball. He drew interest from the college basketball programs at Saint Louis University and Illinois. As a youth, Herzog delivered newspapers, sold baked goods from a truck, dug graves, and worked at the brewery with his father. He was known as "Relly" — a diminutive of Dorrel, his given first name.

His older brother Therron played a year of minor league baseball in 1954 in the Cotton States League.

== Baseball career ==
=== Playing career ===
Herzog both batted and threw left-handed. He was originally signed by the New York Yankees by scout Lou Maguolo. While playing for the McAlester Rockets in the Sooner State League in 1949 and 1950, a sportscaster gave Herzog the nickname "Whitey" due to his light blonde hair and resemblance to blonde Yankees pitcher Bob "The White Rat" Kuzava, (rather than the light blonde Yankee starter and future Hall of Famer Whitey Ford, then on the way to a 9–1 rookie season). In 1953, during the Korean War, Herzog served the U.S. Army Corps of Engineers, during which time he was stationed at Fort Leonard Wood in Missouri and managed the camp's baseball team.

While he was still a minor league prospect, the Yankees traded Herzog to the Washington Senators on April 2, 1956, to complete a February trade in which the Yankees had sent Lou Berberet, Bob Wiesler, Dick Tettelbach, and Herb Plews to Washington for Mickey McDermott. He made his major league debut with the Senators in 1956 and played for them until May 15, 1958, when he was sold to the Kansas City Athletics. Before the 1961 season, the Athletics traded Herzog and Russ Snyder to the Baltimore Orioles for Wayne Causey, Jim Archer, Bob Boyd, Clint Courtney, and Al Pilarcik. After the 1962 season, the Orioles traded Herzog and Gus Triandos to the Detroit Tigers for Dick Brown. Herzog ended his playing career after the 1963 season. In 634 games spread over eight years, Herzog batted .257 with 25 home runs, 172 runs batted in, 213 runs scored, 60 doubles, 20 triples, and 13 stolen bases. In reference to his relative success as a player versus being a manager, Herzog said, "Baseball has been good to me since I quit trying to play it."

=== Player development ===
After his playing career ended, Herzog rejoined the Athletics for two seasons, as a scout in 1964 and a coach in 1965.

His next seven years were spent with the New York Mets, the first, in 1966, as the third-base coach for manager Wes Westrum. Beginning in 1967 Herzog then made his mark with the club during his six-year tenure as its director of player development. On his watch, the Mets produced young talent that either appeared on one or both of its 1969 and 1973 World Series teams or were dealt and had successful major league careers elsewhere. Among this crop of players was Gary Gentry, Wayne Garrett, Jon Matlack, John Milner, Amos Otis, and Ken Singleton. Herzog was a candidate to become the Mets' manager after the death of Gil Hodges prior to the 1972 season, but was passed over in favor of first-base coach Yogi Berra, a future Yankee Hall of Fame catcher and brief ex-Met player, by chairman of the board M. Donald Grant. He had been ordered to not attend Hodges' funeral by Grant's associates to avoid speculation.

== Managerial career ==
=== Rangers and Angels ===
Perceiving Grant's actions as a snub, Herzog left the Mets to accept the first managerial assignment of his career. On November 2, 1972, he signed a two-year contract to lead the Texas Rangers, the only major league team to have 100 losses in 1972. Hired based on recommendations from general manager Joe Burke to owner Bob Short, he'd been given the understanding that he was to help develop the team's young prospects. He immediately abandoned the platoon system used heavily by his predecessor Ted Williams.

Herzog debuted with a 3–1 Rangers loss to the Chicago White Sox at Arlington Stadium on April 7, 1973. His first victory was a 4–0 triumph over the Kansas City Royals five nights later on April 12 at Royals Stadium.

He never got the chance to finish the 1973 season. With the team at 47–91, he was fired on September 7, three days after a 14–0 loss to the White Sox at Comiskey Park. Coach Del Wilber replaced him for one game, followed by Billy Martin, who had been fired by the Detroit Tigers on August 30. Short defended the change by telling reporters, "If my mother were managing the Rangers and I had the opportunity to hire Billy Martin, I'd fire my mother."

Herzog joined the California Angels as their third-base coach in 1974. He was named the team's interim manager on June 27, 1974, the same day that his predecessor Bobby Winkles was fired and also Hall of Fame bound successor Dick Williams was hired. The first game he managed was a 5–0 win for the Angels, who split a four-game weekend series against the Rangers at Anaheim Stadium during his brief 4-game stint.

=== Kansas City Royals ===
Herzog succeeded Jack McKeon as manager of the Kansas City Royals on July 24, 1975, and managed the team from 1975 to 1979. At the time he took over in 1975, the team was in second place in the American League West but trailed the defending and eventual division champion Oakland Athletics by 11 games. The Royals went on to win three straight American League Western division titles from 1976 to 1978. However, each of those seasons ended with losses to the New York Yankees in the American League Championship Series, with each one having their own particular brand of sting. In the 1976 American League Championship Series, the two teams traded wins to see an even series by the time of the decisive Game 5 in New York. The Royals trailed by three runs in the eighth before rallying to tie the game. On the first pitch of the bottom of the ninth, Chris Chambliss hit a series-ending walk off home run off closer Mark Littell. In the 1977 series, the teams traded wins again in the first four, but the Royals had a chance to clinch it at home. Game 5 saw them lead 3–1 going into the eighth inning, but the Yankees narrowed it to a run with a pinch-hit RBI. Now going with Dennis Leonard (who had pitched a complete game two days earlier), it all sputtered. He allowed a hit and a walk before being pulled, but the Yankees continued to hit the ball and scored three runs in the inning before Kansas City went down in the bottom half as the Yankees went to the World Series again. In the 1978 series, the Royals won Game 2 and played competitive in Game 3, but Herzog's decision to go with Doug Bird in the eighth inning to face Thurman Munson resulted in him belting a go-ahead two-run shot as the Yankees won 6-5. The Royals scored a run in first inning of Game 4 but the Yankees led by the end of the 5th and never looked back in a 2-1 victory.

Herzog and general manager Joe Burke clashed during the 1979 season over personnel moves, and he openly chafed at being offered one-year contracts by owner Ewing Kauffman, who in turn did not like the treatment given to first baseman John Mayberry, whose lackadaisical play in Game 4 of the 1977 series had led to Herzog benching him for Game 5 before blaming him for the series loss and then demanding Mayberry be traded. After the 1979 season saw the team finish second to the California Angels, Herzog was fired. Herzog actually expressed criticism of Burke for not doing it sooner, in order to try and give the team a spark during the season.

=== St. Louis Cardinals ===
On June 8, 1980, Herzog was hired by St. Louis Cardinals (under general manager John Claiborne) to manage the team, replacing Ken Boyer. Herzog quickly made his presence known, stating "I'm going to take this dang team and run it like I think it should be run. I don't think I've ever had trouble with players hustling. I understand that's been a problem here. I think you'll see the Cardinals running out groundballs." He won the 1982 World Series, as well as the National League pennant in both 1985 and 1987, and was named The Sporting News Sportsman of the Year in 1982.

Herzog's style of play, based on the strategy of attrition, was nicknamed "Whiteyball" and concentrated on pitching, speed, and defense to win games rather than on home runs. Herzog's lineups generally consisted of one or more base-stealing threats at the top of the lineup, with a power threat such as George Brett or Jack Clark hitting third or fourth, protected by one or two productive hitters, followed by more base stealers. This tactic kept payrolls low, while allowing Herzog to win consistently in stadiums with deep fences and artificial turf, both of which were characteristics of Royals Stadium (now Kauffman Stadium) and Busch Memorial Stadium during his managerial career.

A less noticed (at the time) aspect of Herzog's offensive philosophy was his preference for patient hitters with high on-base percentages: Such players included Royals Brett, Hal McRae, and Amos Otis, and Cardinals Clark, Keith Hernandez, José Oquendo, and Ozzie Smith, as well as Darrell Porter, who played for Herzog in both Kansas City and St. Louis. However, in St. Louis, Herzog also employed free-swinging hitters who were less patient, but were speedy runners and fielders, such as six-time NL stolen base champion Vince Coleman and 1985 NL MVP Willie McGee.

Herzog's final season with the Cardinals, and in his managerial career, was the 1990 season; he resigned on July 6 of that year with the team at 33–47 and in last place in the NL East. He jokingly stated, "I came here in last place and I leave here in last place. I left them right where I started." His overall Cardinals record was 822 wins and 728 losses.

== General managing career ==
With his extensive background in player development, Herzog also was a major league general manager with both the Cardinals (1980–82) and the California Angels (1993–94).

Herzog succeeded interim manager Jack Krol as manager of the Cardinals on June 9, 1980, managed for 73 games, then moved into the club's front office as general manager on August 26, turning the team over to Red Schoendienst. During the off-season, Herzog reclaimed the manager job, then held both the general and field manager posts with St. Louis for almost two full seasons, during which he acquired or promoted many players who would star on the Cardinals' three World Series teams of the 1980s. In a 1983 poll of major league players by The New York Times, Herzog was voted best manager in baseball.

Herzog served as general manager of the California Angels from 1993 to 1994. During his tenure, the Angels went 118–159, missing the 1993 postseason (with the 1994 playoffs cancelled due to a players' strike).

Herzog's tenure was overshadowed by a feud with owner Jackie Autry over the team's budget constraints, a power struggle with team Vice-President Dave O'Brien, and the loss of key free agents like Dave Winfield and Wally Joyner.

== Later years ==
Herzog expressed an interest in becoming President of the National League when that job opened in 1986. The role eventually went to Yale University President A. Bartlett Giamatti, who was promoted to be the Commissioner of baseball in 1989. In a nationally televised interview on NBC, after Giamatti accepted the job of NL President, Marv Albert jokingly asked Herzog if he would be interested in the job opening for president of Yale University. Herzog replied, "Well, you're trying to be funny now, Marv. I don't think that's funny at all."

Both Herzog and Jim Leyland were candidates to become manager of the Boston Red Sox following the 1996 season. Both rejected offers from the Red Sox, so the team hired Jimy Williams instead.

== Managerial record and legacy ==
Whitey Herzog's number 24 was retired by the St. Louis Cardinals in 2010.

Herzog was elected to the Baseball Hall of Fame by the Veterans' Committee on December 7, 2009, receiving 14 of a possible 16 votes. The Cardinals retired the jersey number 24, which he wore during his managerial tenure with the club, following his induction. Rick Ankiel was the last Cardinal to wear number 24.

In total, Herzog led six division winners, three pennant winners, and one World Series winner in compiling a 1,281–1,125 (.532) career record.

Team	Year	Regular season					Postseason			
Team	Year	Games	Won	Lost	Win %	Finish	Won	Lost	Win %	Result
TEX	1973	138	47	91	.341	Fired	–	–	–	
CAL	1974	4	2	2	.562	interim	–	–	–	
KC	1975	66	41	25	.621	2nd in AL West	–	–	–	
KC	1976	162	90	72	.556	1st in AL West	2	3	.400	Lost ALCS (NYY)
KC	1977	162	102	60	.630	1st in AL West	2	3	.400	Lost ALCS (NYY)
KC	1978	162	92	70	.568	1st in AL West	1	3	.250	Lost ALCS (NYY)
KC	1979	162	85	77	.525	2nd in AL West	–	–	–	
KC total		714	410	304	.574		5	9	.357	
STL	1980	73	38	35	.521	4th in NL East	-	-	-	
STL	1981	51	30	20	.600	2nd in NL East	–	–	–	
STL	1981	52	29	23	.558	2nd in NL East	–	–	–	
STL	1982	162	92	70	.568	1st in NL East	7	3	.700	Won World Series (MIL)
STL	1983	162	79	83	.488	4th in NL East	-	-	-	
STL	1984	162	84	78	.519	3rd in NL East	-	-	-	
STL	1985	162	101	61	.623	1st in NL East	7	6	.538	Lost World Series (KC)
STL	1986	161	79	82	.491	3rd in NL East	-	-	-	
STL	1987	162	95	67	.586	1st in NL East	7	7	.500	Lost World Series (MIN)
STL	1988	162	76	86	.469	5th in NL East	-	-	-	
STL	1989	164	86	76	.531	3rd in NL East	-	-	-	
STL	1990	80	33	47	.413	Resigned	-	-	-	
STL total		1,553	822	728	.530		21	16	.568	
Total		2,409 (Note: Herzog also managed in three games that ended in ties - one in 1981 and two in 1989)	1,281	1,125	.532		26	25	.510	

== Personal life ==
Herzog married his high school sweetheart, Mary Lou (née Sinn), in 1953. They had three children.

Herzog resided in St. Louis, Missouri. His younger brother, Codell ("Butz") died on February 20, 2010, at 76. He made out Whitey's first lineup with the Cardinals in 1980. His grandson John Urick was a minor league first baseman and outfielder from 2003 until 2010 who played for managers and former Herzog-era Cardinals Garry Templeton and Hal Lanier.

In January 2014, the Cardinals announced Herzog among 22 former players and personnel to be inducted into the St. Louis Cardinals Hall of Fame Museum for the inaugural class of 2014.

Herzog died in St. Louis on April 15, 2024, at the age of 92. Upon his death, Commissioner Rob Manfred released a statement:

Whitey Herzog was one of the most accomplished managers of his generation and a consistent winner with both 'I-70' franchises. He made a significant impact on the St. Louis Cardinals as both a manager and a general manager, with the Kansas City Royals as a manager and with the New York Mets in player development. Whitey's Cardinals' teams reached the World Series three times in the 1980s, winning the championship in 1982, by leaning on an identity of speed and defense that resonated with baseball fans across the world. On behalf of Major League Baseball, I extend my deepest condolences to Whitey's family, his friends across the game and the fans of the Cardinals and the Royals.

== See also ==
- List of Major League Baseball managers with most career wins

Sporting positions
Preceded by John Claiborne	St. Louis Cardinals General Manager; 1980–1982	Succeeded by Joe McDonald
Preceded by Dan O'Brien Sr.	California Angels General Manager; 1993–1994	Succeeded by Bill Bavasi
