= List of Kansas City Royals seasons =

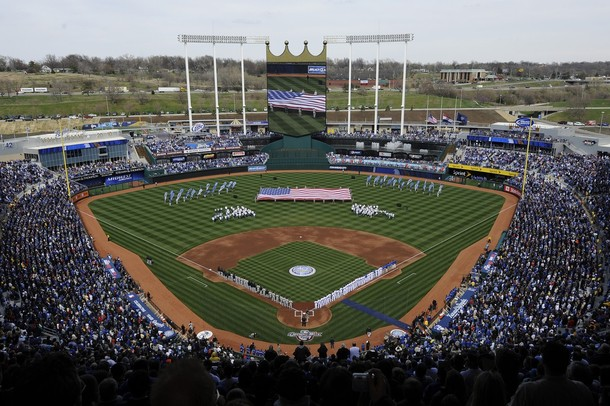
Kauffman Stadium, home stadium for the Royals since 1973.

This is a list of seasons completed by the Kansas City Royals, a professional baseball franchise based in Kansas City, Missouri. They formerly played in the American League West until the 1994 realignment, where they now compete in the American League Central Division.

The team was formed by pharmaceutical executive Ewing Kauffman as a result of the move of the Athletics to Oakland, and began play in 1969. They quickly became competitive, achieving a winning record in their third season with an 85–76 win–loss record. By 1976, the young team was becoming the dominant force in the American League West, winning 90 or more games in four consecutive seasons from 1975 to 1978.

Despite two lapses to below 80 wins in the 1980s, the Royals continued to be a strong force, reaching the 1980 World Series (before being defeated by the Philadelphia Phillies), and winning in 1985 against cross-state rivals the St. Louis Cardinals. During that postseason, they became the first team to ever rally from a three games to one deficit twice to win the World Series. The 2016 Chicago Cubs accomplished the same feat, by defeating the Cleveland Indians in a seven-game series.

The team remained competitive throughout the mid-1990s before entering a long period of failure. From 1995 through 2013, the team had only two winning seasons in 2003 and 2013. For 28 consecutive seasons, between the 1985 World Series championship and 2014, the Royals did not qualify to play in the Major League Baseball postseason, one of the longest postseason droughts during baseball's expanded wild-card era. The worst years during this era were from 2002 to 2006, when the Royals had four 100-loss seasons out of five.

The team broke its postseason drought by securing the franchise's first ever wild card berth in 2014. They advanced to the 2014 World Series, where they were defeated by the San Francisco Giants in seven games. The next season, the team would go 95–67, the best record in the American League, securing the franchise's first divisional title since 1985, and the first Central division title ever. The team would eventually advance to the 2015 World Series, where they defeated the New York Mets in five games.

== Table Key ==
| ALWC | American League Wild Card |
| ALDS | American League Division Series |
| ALCS | American League Championship Series |
| MVP | Most Valuable Player Award |
| CYA | Cy Young Award |
| ROY | Rookie of the Year Award |
| MOY | Manager of the Year Award |
| WS MVP | World Series Most Valuable Player Award |

== Regular season results ==
| World Series champions † | AL champions * | Division champions ^ | Wild card berth (1995–present) ¤ |

| Season | Level | League | Division | Finish | Wins | Losses | Win% | GB | Postseason | Awards |
|---|---|---|---|---|---|---|---|---|---|---|
| 1969 | MLB | AL | West | 4th | 69 | 93 | .426 | 28 | | Lou Piniella (ROY) |
| 1970 | MLB | AL | West | T–4th | 65 | 97 | .401 | 33 | | |
| 1971 | MLB | AL | West | 2nd | 85 | 76 | .528 | 16 | | |
| 1972 | MLB | AL | West | 4th | 76 | 78 | .494 | 16½ | | |
| 1973 | MLB | AL | West | 2nd | 88 | 74 | .543 | 6 | | |
| 1974 | MLB | AL | West | 5th | 77 | 85 | .475 | 13 | | |
| 1975 | MLB | AL | West | 2nd | 91 | 71 | .562 | 7 | | |
| 1976 | MLB | AL | West ^ | 1st | 90 | 72 | .556 | – | Lost ALCS (Yankees) 3–2 | |
| 1977 | MLB | AL | West ^ | 1st | 102 | 60 | .630 | – | Lost ALCS (Yankees) 3–2 | |
| 1978 | MLB | AL | West ^ | 1st | 92 | 70 | .568 | – | Lost ALCS (Yankees) 3–1 | |
| 1979 | MLB | AL | West | 2nd | 85 | 77 | .525 | 3 | | |
| 1980 | MLB | AL * | West ^ | 1st | 97 | 65 | .599 | – | Won ALCS (Yankees) 3–0; Lost World Series (Phillies) 4–2 * | George Brett (MVP) |
| 1981 | MLB | AL | West | 5th | 20 | 30 | .400 | 12 | Lost ALDS (Athletics) 3–0 | |
| 1981 | MLB | AL | West | 1st ^ | 30 | 23 | .566 | – | Lost ALDS (Athletics) 3–0 | |
| 1982 | MLB | AL | West | 2nd | 90 | 72 | .556 | 3 | | |
| 1983 | MLB | AL | West | 2nd | 79 | 83 | .488 | 20 | | |
| 1984 | MLB | AL | West ^ | 1st | 84 | 78 | .519 | – | Lost ALCS (Tigers) 3–0 | |
| 1985 | MLB † | AL * | West ^ | 1st | 91 | 71 | .562 | – | Won ALCS (Blue Jays) 4–3; Won World Series (Cardinals) 4–3 † | Bret Saberhagen (CYA, WS MVP) |
| 1986 | MLB | AL | West | T–3rd | 76 | 86 | .469 | 16 | | |
| 1987 | MLB | AL | West | 2nd | 83 | 79 | .512 | 2 | | |
| 1988 | MLB | AL | West | 3rd | 84 | 77 | .522 | 19½ | | |
| 1989 | MLB | AL | West | 2nd | 92 | 70 | .568 | 7 | | Bret Saberhagen (CYA) |
| 1990 | MLB | AL | West | 6th | 75 | 86 | .466 | 27½ | | |
| 1991 | MLB | AL | West | 6th | 82 | 80 | .506 | 13 | | |
| 1992 | MLB | AL | West | T–5th | 72 | 90 | .444 | 24 | | |
| 1993 | MLB | AL | West | 3rd | 84 | 78 | .519 | 10 | | |
| 1994 | MLB | AL | Central | 3rd | 64 | 51 | .557 | 4 | Playoffs canceled | Bob Hamelin (ROY); David Cone (CYA) |
| 1995 | MLB | AL | Central | 2nd | 70 | 74 | .486 | 30 | | |
| 1996 | MLB | AL | Central | 5th | 75 | 86 | .466 | 24 | | |
| 1997 | MLB | AL | Central | 5th | 67 | 94 | .416 | 19½ | | |
| 1998 | MLB | AL | Central | 3rd | 72 | 89 | .447 | 16½ | | |
| 1999 | MLB | AL | Central | 4th | 64 | 97 | .398 | 32½ | | Carlos Beltrán (ROY) |
| 2000 | MLB | AL | Central | 4th | 77 | 85 | .475 | 18 | | |
| 2001 | MLB | AL | Central | 5th | 65 | 97 | .401 | 26 | | |
| 2002 | MLB | AL | Central | 4th | 62 | 100 | .383 | 32½ | | |
| 2003 | MLB | AL | Central | 3rd | 83 | 79 | .512 | 7 | | Ángel Berroa (ROY); Tony Peña (MOY) |
| 2004 | MLB | AL | Central | 5th | 58 | 104 | .358 | 34 | | |
| 2005 | MLB | AL | Central | 5th | 56 | 106 | .346 | 43 | | |
| 2006 | MLB | AL | Central | 5th | 62 | 100 | .383 | 34 | | |
| 2007 | MLB | AL | Central | 5th | 69 | 93 | .426 | 27 | | |
| 2008 | MLB | AL | Central | 4th | 75 | 87 | .463 | 13½ | | |
| 2009 | MLB | AL | Central | T–4th | 65 | 97 | .401 | 21½ | | Zack Greinke (CYA) |
| 2010 | MLB | AL | Central | 5th | 67 | 95 | .414 | 27 | | |
| 2011 | MLB | AL | Central | 4th | 71 | 91 | .438 | 24 | | |
| 2012 | MLB | AL | Central | 3rd | 72 | 90 | .444 | 16 | | |
| 2013 | MLB | AL | Central | 3rd | 86 | 76 | .531 | 7 | | |
| 2014 | MLB | AL * | Central | 2nd ¤ | 89 | 73 | .549 | 1 | Won ALWC (Athletics); Won ALDS (Angels) 3–0; Won ALCS (Orioles) 4–0; Lost World Series (Giants) 4–3 * | |
| 2015 | MLB † | AL * | Central ^ | 1st | 95 | 67 | .586 | — | Won ALDS (Astros) 3–2; Won ALCS (Blue Jays) 4–2; Won World Series (Mets) 4–1 † | Salvador Pérez (WS MVP) |
| 2016 | MLB | AL | Central | 3rd | 81 | 81 | .500 | 13½ | | |
| 2017 | MLB | AL | Central | 3rd | 80 | 82 | .494 | 22 | | |
| 2018 | MLB | AL | Central | 5th | 58 | 104 | .358 | 33 | | |
| 2019 | MLB | AL | Central | 4th | 59 | 103 | .364 | 42 | | |
| 2020 | MLB | AL | Central | 4th | 26 | 34 | .433 | 10 | | |
| 2021 | MLB | AL | Central | 4th | 74 | 88 | .457 | 19 | | |
| 2022 | MLB | AL | Central | 5th | 65 | 97 | .401 | 27 | | |
| 2023 | MLB | AL | Central | 5th | 56 | 106 | .346 | 31 | | |
| 2024 | MLB | AL | Central | 2nd ¤ | 86 | 76 | .531 | 6½ | Won ALWC (Orioles) 2–0; Lost ALDS (Yankees) 3–1 | |
| 2025 | MLB | AL | Central | 3rd | 82 | 80 | .506 | 6 | | |
| 2026 | MLB | AL | Central | 5th | 69 | 93 | .426 | 16 | | |
| Totals | | | | | Wins | Losses | Win% | | | |
| Totals | | | | | 4,359 | 4,796 | .476 | All-time regular season record (1969–2026) | | |
| Totals | | | | | 43 | 37 | .538 | All-time postseason record | | |
| Totals | | | | | 4,402 | 4,833 | .477 | All-time regular and postseason record | | |

== Record by decade ==
The following table describes the Royals' MLB win–loss record by decade.

| Decade | Wins | Losses | Pct |
|---|---|---|---|
| 1960s | 69 | 93 | .426 |
| 1970s | 851 | 760 | .528 |
| 1980s | 826 | 734 | .529 |
| 1990s | 725 | 825 | .468 |
| 2000s | 672 | 948 | .415 |
| 2010s | 758 | 862 | .468 |
| 2020s | 458 | 574 | .444 |
| All-time | 4359 | 4796 | .476 |

These statistics are from Baseball-Reference.com's Kansas City Royals History & Encyclopedia.

== Postseason appearances ==
| Year | Wild Card Game/Series | | LDS | | LCS | | World Series | |
|---|---|---|---|---|---|---|---|---|
| 1976 | None (Won AL West) | | | | New York Yankees | L (2–3) | | |
| 1977 | None (Won AL West) | | | | New York Yankees | L (2–3) | | |
| 1978 | None (Won AL West) | | | | New York Yankees | L (1–3) | | |
| 1980 | None (Won AL West) | | | | New York Yankees | W (3–0) | Philadelphia Phillies | L (2–4) |
| 1981 | None (Won AL West) | | Oakland Athletics | L (0–3) | | | | |
| 1984 | None (Won AL West) | | | | Detroit Tigers | L (0–3) | | |
| 1985 | None (Won AL West) | | | | Toronto Blue Jays | W (4–3) | St. Louis Cardinals | W (4–3) |
| 2014 | Oakland Athletics W | | Los Angeles Angels of Anaheim | W (3–0) | Baltimore Orioles | W (4–0) | San Francisco Giants | L (3–4) |
| 2015 | None (Won AL Central) | | Houston Astros | W (3–2) | Toronto Blue Jays | W (4–2) | New York Mets | W (4–1) |
| 2024 | Baltimore Orioles | W (2–0) | New York Yankees | L (1–3) | | | | |

== Postseason record by year ==
The Royals have made the postseason ten times, with the first one being in the 1976 season and the most recent being in 2024.

| Year | Finish | Round | Opponent | Result | | |
|---|---|---|---|---|---|---|
| 1976 | AL West Champions | ALCS | New York Yankees | Lost | 2 | 3 |
| 1977 | AL West Champions | ALCS | New York Yankees | Lost | 2 | 3 |
| 1978 | AL West Champions | ALCS | New York Yankees | Lost | 1 | 3 |
| 1980 | American League Champions | ALCS | New York Yankees | Won | 3 | 0 |
| 1980 | American League Champions | World Series | Philadelphia Phillies | Lost | 2 | 4 |
| 1981 | AL West Champions (second half) | ALDS | Oakland Athletics | Lost | 0 | 3 |
| 1984 | AL West Champions | ALCS | Detroit Tigers | Lost | 0 | 3 |
| 1985 | World Series Champions | ALCS | Toronto Blue Jays | Won | 4 | 3 |
| 1985 | World Series Champions | World Series | St. Louis Cardinals | Won | 4 | 3 |
| 2014 | American League Champions | Wild Card Game | Oakland Athletics | Won | 1 | 0 |
| 2014 | American League Champions | ALDS | Anaheim Angels | Won | 3 | 0 |
| 2014 | American League Champions | ALCS | Baltimore Orioles | Won | 4 | 0 |
| 2014 | American League Champions | World Series | San Francisco Giants | Lost | 3 | 4 |
| 2015 | World Series Champions | ALDS | Houston Astros | Won | 3 | 2 |
| 2015 | World Series Champions | ALCS | Toronto Blue Jays | Won | 4 | 2 |
| 2015 | World Series Champions | World Series | New York Mets | Won | 4 | 1 |
| 2024 | American League Wild Card | Wild Card Series | Baltimore Orioles | Won | 2 | 0 |
| 2024 | American League Wild Card | ALDS | New York Yankees | Lost | 1 | 3 |
| 10 | Totals | | | 10–8 | 43 | 37 |
