= 1977 American League Championship Series =

9th edition of Major League Baseball's American League Championship Series

Team (Wins)	Managers	Season
New York Yankees (3)	Billy Martin	100–62, .617, GA: 2½
Kansas City Royals (2)	Whitey Herzog	102–60, .630, GA: 8
- Dates: October 5–9
- Umpires: Jerry Neudecker; Russ Goetz; Jim McKean; Marty Springstead; Nick Bremigan; Bill Deegan

Broadcast
- Television: NBC; WPIX (NYY); KBMA-TV (KC)
- TV announcers: NBC: Jim Simpson and Maury Wills (Game 1); Dick Enberg and Don Drysdale (Game 2); Joe Garagiola and Tony Kubek (in Kansas City); WPIX: Phil Rizzuto, Frank Messer and Bill White; KBMA-TV: Denny Matthews and Fred White
- Radio: CBS; WMCA (NYY); WIBW (KC)
- Radio announcers: CBS: Ernie Harwell and Ned Martin; WMCA: Phil Rizzuto, Frank Messer and Bill White; WIBW: Denny Matthews and Fred White

The 1977 American League Championship Series was a five-game series in Major League Baseball's 1977 postseason played between October 5 and 9, 1977, between the Eastern division champion New York Yankees and the Western division champion Kansas City Royals.

The games were played at Yankee Stadium (Games 1–2), and Royals Stadium (3–5). The Yankees took the series 3–2, and defeated the Los Angeles Dodgers in the 1977 World Series to take the title. Kansas City was given home-field advantage as it rotated back to the Western division; the Royals held a 102–60 record to the Yankees' 100–62 record.

== History ==
This was the second straight year in which the Royals and the Yankees squared off in the ALCS. The year before in the 1976 ALCS, the Yankees took the series in five games on a Chris Chambliss home run in the ninth inning of Game 5.

This series, they would again win it in their last at bat.

== Overview ==
Each game of the series was dominated by, mostly, hitting. However, the pitchers of each team held their own and it made for some exciting games.

The first game's matchup was Paul Splittorff (16–6) versus Don Gullett (14–4). Although the matchup seemed to not exactly be the classic Game 1 pitcher's duel, these two pitchers were the best of their profession for that season, although Gullett's was plagued with some shoulder injuries.

== Summary ==
=== Kansas City Royals vs. New York Yankees ===
New York won the series, 3–2.

Game	Date	Score	Location	Time	Attendance
1	October 5	Kansas City Royals – 7, New York Yankees – 2	Yankee Stadium	2:40	54,930
2	October 6	Kansas City Royals – 2, New York Yankees – 6	Yankee Stadium	2:58	56,230
3	October 7	New York Yankees – 2, Kansas City Royals – 6	Royals Stadium	2:19	41,285
4	October 8	New York Yankees – 6, Kansas City Royals – 4	Royals Stadium	3:08	41,135
5	October 9	New York Yankees – 5, Kansas City Royals – 3	Royals Stadium	3:04	41,133

== Game summaries ==
=== Game 1 ===
October 5, 1977 3:15 pm (ET) at Yankee Stadium in Bronx, New York 66 °F (19 °C) mostly sunny
Team	1	2	3	4	5	6	7	8	9	R	H	E
Kansas City	2	2	2	0	0	0	0	1	0	7	9	0
New York	0	0	2	0	0	0	0	0	0	2	9	0
WP: Paul Splittorff (1–0) LP: Don Gullett (0–1); Home runs: KC: Hal McRae (1), John Mayberry (1), Al Cowens (1); NYY: Thurman Munson (1)

The visiting Royals jumped on the sore-shouldered Don Gullett early and never looked back. Hal McRae hit a two-run home run in the first and Freddie Patek had a two-run double in the second. John Mayberry hit a two-run home run off Dick Tidrow in the third. Thurman Munson provided the Yankee runs in the third with a two-run home run of his own, but that was the only blemish on a pitching gem by Paul Splittorff. Splittorff went eight strong innings and Doug Bird closed it in the ninth. Al Cowens added a home run for the Royals in the eighth off Tidrow.

=== Game 2 ===
October 6, 1977 8:15 pm (ET) at Yankee Stadium in Bronx, New York 58 °F (14 °C) clear
Team	1	2	3	4	5	6	7	8	9	R	H	E
Kansas City	0	0	1	0	0	1	0	0	0	2	3	1
New York	0	0	0	0	2	3	0	1	X	6	10	1
WP: Ron Guidry (1–0) LP: Andy Hassler (0–1); Home runs: KC: None; NYY: Cliff Johnson (1)

The Royals had hopes of putting the Yankees down 2–0 going back to KC, and for a while that appeared possible. Beating new-found Yankees' ace Ron Guidry would be a tough task. The Royals scraped a run in the third when Freddie Patek drove in Darrell Porter with a sacrifice fly.

Royals' starter Andy Hassler had a shutout going for four innings, but Cliff Johnson broke the drought with a home run in the fifth. The Yankees took a 2–1 lead in the same inning when Willie Randolph singled, Hassler balked him to second, and Bucky Dent drove him home with a single.

Hard base-running helped the Royals tie it in the sixth inning. Patek led off with a double and Hal McRae walked. The next batter, George Brett, grounded to Graig Nettles, who threw to Randolph at second to force McRae. McRae, however, barreled into Randolph with a body-block, breaking up the double play attempt and enabling Patek to score the tying run.

McRae's aggressive ploy seemed to ignite the Yankees in their half of the sixth. Thurman Munson singled with one out off Hassler, then Lou Piniella singled with two outs off Mark Littell. Johnson doubled in a run and after an intentional walk, an error by Brett on a Randolph grounder allowed two more runs to score to make it 5–2. Randolph also had an RBI single in the eighth off Little.

Meanwhile, Guidry stymied the Royals, pitching a complete game and allowing the Royals only three hits and the two runs.

=== Game 3 ===
October 7, 1977 7:15 pm (CT) at Royals Stadium in Kansas City, Missouri 54 °F (12 °C) partly cloudy
Team	1	2	3	4	5	6	7	8	9	R	H	E
New York	0	0	0	0	1	0	0	0	1	2	4	1
Kansas City	0	1	1	0	1	2	1	0	X	6	12	1
WP: Dennis Leonard (1–0) LP: Mike Torrez (0–1)

At Kauffman Stadium, Dennis Leonard pitched a four-hit complete game to give the Royals a 2–1 series lead. After a one-out walk and single, Freddie Patek's RBI single off Mike Torrez in the second put the Royals up 1–0. Next inning, Al Cowens' groundout with runners on second and third and no outs made it 2–0 Royals. The Yankees got on the board in the fifth when Graig Nettles singled with two outs and scored on Lou Pinella's double, but the Royals got that run back in the bottom of the inning when Hal McRae hit a leadoff double, moved to third on a groundout, and scored on Cowens' groundout. Next inning, Torrez allowed a leadoff walk and single, then got two outs before being relieved by Sparky Lyle, who allowed a two-run double to Amos Otis. Next inning, George Brett hit a leadoff single and scored on John Mayberry's RBI double. The Yankees got a run in the ninth when Roy White doubled with one out and scored on first baseman Mayberry's error on Reggie Jackson's ground ball before Chris Chambliss grounded out to end the game.

=== Game 4 ===
October 8, 1977 12:15 pm (CT) at Royals Stadium in Kansas City, Missouri 53 °F (12 °C) overcast
Team	1	2	3	4	5	6	7	8	9	R	H	E
New York	1	2	1	1	0	0	0	0	1	6	13	0
Kansas City	0	0	2	2	0	0	0	0	0	4	8	2
WP: Sparky Lyle (1–0) LP: Larry Gura (0–1)

This game was a barn-burner early on, with the Yankees precariously clinging to the upper hand. New York jumped out to an early 4–0 lead after 2 1/2 innings on RBIs by Thurman Munson, Bucky Dent, Mickey Rivers, and Lou Piniella. The Royals clawed back in the home half of the third when Freddie Patek, having a fine series for himself, tripled and scored on a short fly ball hit by Frank White, barely beating Reggie Jackson's throw to the plate. George Brett tripled in a run in the same inning.

After Graig Nettles singled in a run in the fourth to make it 5–2, the Royals got two more in their half. With two outs, Patek doubled in a run, chasing Yankee starter Ed Figueroa. White doubled in Patek and Hal McRae drew a walk off reliever Dick Tidrow. At this point, Yankee manager Billy Martin made a gutsy move, bringing in his ace closer and AL Cy Young Award winner, Sparky Lyle. Lyle was rarely used this early in a game, but Martin figured he was fresh, having only pitched one inning the whole series and, in Martin's own words, "I wanted my best pitcher out there."

But the move paid off as Lyle got George Brett to fly out to Lou Piniella in left to end the 4th inning, then shut the Royals down by allowing only two hits and no runners past second base over the last 5 innings. The Yankees added insurance in the ninth on a Munson sacrifice fly.

=== Game 5 ===
October 9, 1977 7:15 pm (CT) at Royals Stadium in Kansas City, Missouri 61 °F (16 °C) mostly cloudy
Team	1	2	3	4	5	6	7	8	9	R	H	E
New York	0	0	1	0	0	0	0	1	3	5	10	0
Kansas City	2	0	1	0	0	0	0	0	0	3	10	1
WP: Sparky Lyle (2–0) LP: Dennis Leonard (1–1)

In order for the Yankees to advance to their second straight World Series, they would have to win again at the Royals' home park. To do that, they would have to beat their Game 1 nemesis, Paul Splittorff. Given that, Yankee manager Billy Martin decided to sit out Reggie Jackson on the grounds that he was 1-for-15 so far in the series and, in his own words, "can't hit Splittorff." Paul Blair started in right field and batted eighth.

The Royals struck for a pair in the first when Hal McRae singled and George Brett tripled him in. Brett slid hard into Graig Nettles at third and Nettles responded by kicking Brett, which started a bench-clearing brawl. Yankees' starting pitcher Ron Guidry rushed in to defend Nettles. After order was restored, Al Cowens drove in Brett with a groundout.

The Yankees crept back in the third on a Thurman Munson RBI single, but the Royals matched that in the bottom half on a double by McRae and RBI single by Cowens with one out. Martin then pulled Guidry, who had gotten hurt in the first-inning brawl. Mike Torrez came in and pitched shutout ball over the next 5 1/3 innings.

The Yankees began to claw back in the eighth. Right-hander Doug Bird relieved Splittorff after Willie Randolph led off the inning with a single. With one out, Piniella singled Randolph to third. With the "unhittable" Splittorff out of the game, Martin decided to send Jackson to the plate to hit for Cliff Johnson. Jackson put aside all frustrations over not starting the game and came through with a pinch-hit RBI single to cut the Royal lead to 3–2.

The Royals mounted a threat in their half of the eighth. Torrez walked both Amos Otis and Pete LaCock with two outs, but relief ace Sparky Lyle came in and struck out Cookie Rojas, the Royals' DH playing in what would be his last major-league game.

With apparently very little confidence in regular closer Mark Littell, who struggled in 1977, Royals manager Whitey Herzog sent Game 3 stopper Dennis Leonard out to preserve the lead in the ninth. Leonard, unaccustomed to short relief, yielded a bloop single to Paul Blair and walked Roy White (pinch hitting for Bucky Dent) with no outs. Herzog, going with percentages, replaced Leonard with another normal starter, left-hander Larry Gura. The strategy backfired as Gura gave up a game-tying RBI single to Mickey Rivers, with White reaching third. Herzog then brought in Littell, who retired Willie Randolph on a deep drive to center as White tagged and scored the go-ahead run. Munson was retired, but Piniella hit a grounder to third that Brett threw away at first, scoring Rivers with the final run.

Lyle then retired the Royals in the ninth, the final outs coming when Freddie Patek hit into a double play. As the Yankees celebrated, Patek sat in the dugout, dejected, for several minutes. (Coincidentally, it was Patek's 33rd birthday that day.) Tony Kubek, commentating for NBC, summed up: "The Yankees know how to win."

== Composite box ==
1977 ALCS (3–2): New York Yankees over Kansas City Royals

Team	1	2	3	4	5	6	7	8	9	R	H	E
New York Yankees	1	2	4	1	3	3	0	2	5	21	46	2
Kansas City Royals	4	3	7	2	1	3	1	1	0	22	42	5
Total attendance: 234,713 Average attendance: 46,943
