= Willie Wilson (baseball) =

American baseball player (born 1955)

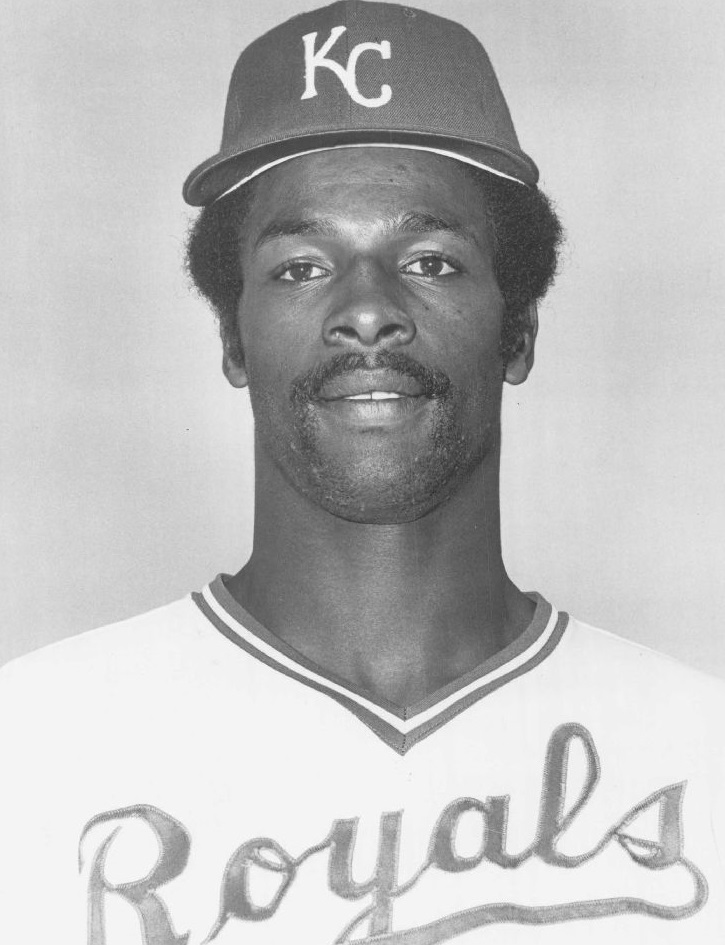
- Wilson in 1978
- Outfielder
- Born: July 9, 1955 (age 70); Montgomery, Alabama, U.S.
- Batted: Switch Threw: Right

MLB debut
- September 4, 1976, for the Kansas City Royals

Last MLB appearance
- May 16, 1994, for the Chicago Cubs

MLB statistics
- Batting average: .285
- Hits: 2,207
- Home runs: 41
- Runs batted in: 585
- Stolen bases: 668
- Stats at Baseball Reference

Teams
- Kansas City Royals (1976–1990); Oakland Athletics (1991–1992); Chicago Cubs (1993–1994)

Career highlights and awards
- 2× All-Star (1982, 1983); World Series champion (1985); Gold Glove Award (1980); 2× Silver Slugger Award (1980, 1982); AL batting champion (1982); AL stolen base leader (1979); Kansas City Royals Hall of Fame

Willie James Wilson (born July 9, 1955) is an American former professional baseball player. He played 19 seasons in Major League Baseball for the Kansas City Royals, Oakland Athletics, and Chicago Cubs. He was an outfielder known for his speed and ability as an effective leadoff hitter. Wilson's career total of 668 stolen bases currently ranks him in 12th place all-time among major leaguers.

== Early life ==
Wilson was born in Montgomery, Alabama, but moved to Summit, New Jersey, at seven years old. He was a highly regarded high school baseball, football, and basketball player at Summit High School. In his senior year, he hit .436 and stole 28 bases in 28 attempts.

== Professional career ==
=== Early years ===
Wilson was drafted out of high school after signing a letter of intent to play college football at Maryland. The Kansas City Royals picked him in the first round (18th overall) of the 1974 Major League Baseball draft. He started his professional career with the Gulf Coast Royals, batting .252 with a home run, 14 RBI and 24 stolen bases in 47 games. He moved up to Single-A in 1975 for the Waterloo Royals, leading the 1975 Midwest League champions in both RBI (73) and stolen bases (76). In 1976, Wilson played for the Double-A Jacksonville Suns, batting .253 with a home run, 35 RBI and 37 stolen bases in 107 games. He earned a September call-up in 1976, playing in 12 games. He was mostly used as a pinch runner or defensive replacement, but did start one game on the penultimate day of the season. He had just six at bats, getting one hit and stealing two bases.

Wilson began the 1977 season with the Triple-A Omaha Royals. In what turned out to be his last minor league action (not counting a stunt appearance in 2009), he batted .281 with four home runs, 47 RBI and 74 stolen bases in 132 games. He was again called up in September, this time receiving more substantial playing time, batting .324 in 34 at bats with six stolen bases.

1978 was Wilson's first full season in the majors. He split the left field job with Tom Poquette, Clint Hurdle and Joe Zdeb, getting the most playing time at the position among the four, while also backing up Amos Otis in center field. Overall, he played in 127 games, but had just 198 at bats while batting .217 with 16 RBI. Despite his limited playing time, he finished fifth in the American League with 46 stolen bases. He also appeared in three games in the 1978 American League Championship Series against the New York Yankees, going 1-for-4 (.250) in the series. He also earned a start in left field in Game 4, finishing the game 1-for-3.

=== Getting established ===
==== 1979 ====
Wilson started the 1979 season as the Royals' fourth outfielder, but by mid-May he had established himself as the team's starting left fielder. In 154 games, he batted .315 with six home runs and 49 RBI. Wilson led the league in stolen bases (83) and singles (148) while also finishing seventh in hits (185) and third in triples (13). On defense, he led the league in range factor and putouts and finished second in assists among left fielders.

==== 1980 ====
In 1980, Wilson started the year as the starting center fielder when Amos Otis opened the season on the disabled list, and acquitted himself well, posting an above-average range factor and making just one error in 195 total chances for the year in center. He moved back to left when Otis returned in late May, and wound up leading the league in several categories. Wilson finished with a .326 average, three home runs, 49 RBI and 79 stolen bases (in 89 attempts) in 161 games. His 705 official at bats were a major league record until it was surpassed by Jimmy Rollins in 2007. He also led the league in hits (230), runs scored (133), triples (15), and singles (184). Wilson finished second in stolen bases, and had at least 100 hits from both sides of the plate. He won both the Gold Glove and Silver Slugger Awards, and was fourth in the AL MVP voting, his best finish.

During Game 2 of the 1980 ALCS, the Yankees' Willie Randolph was on second base in the top of the eighth with two outs and the Royals up by just one run. Bob Watson hit a ball to the left field corner of Royals Stadium. The ball bounced right to Wilson, but Yankee third base coach Mike Ferraro waved Randolph home. Wilson overthrew U L Washington, the cut-off man, but George Brett was in position behind him to catch the ball, then throw to Darrell Porter, who tagged out Randolph in a slide. TV cameras captured Yankee owner George Steinbrenner fuming immediately after the play. The Royals won 3–2. Wilson batted .308 and tied George Brett for the team lead in runs batted in with four during the series as the Royals swept the Yankees in three straight games. In the 1980 World Series, Wilson batted just .154 and struck out against Tug McGraw for the final out of the Royals' Game 6 loss to the Philadelphia Phillies. This strikeout was Wilson's 12th of the Series, breaking the record of 11 held jointly by Eddie Mathews and Wayne Garrett in the 1958 and 1973 World Series, respectively. Ryan Howard would break Wilson's record by striking out 13 times in the 2009 World Series.

==== 1981–83 ====
Wilson's batting average slipped to .303 in the strike-shortened 1981 season, and most of his other numbers were off from the previous two seasons as well. In the 1981 American League Division Series against the Oakland A's, he batted .308, but failed to score a run, steal a base, or get an extra-base hit in the three-game sweep.

In 1982, Wilson bounced back to bat .332 with three home runs and 46 RBI in 136 games. He won the AL batting title, the first switch hitter to do so since Mickey Mantle in 1956. Although the Royals missed the playoffs for the first time since 1979, Wilson made his first American League All-Star team that year and winning his second Silver Slugger Award. He led the league in singles (157) for the fourth year in a row and in triples (15) for the second time in three seasons.

In 1983, Wilson moved to center field in June when the club decided to shuffle their outfield, moving long-time center fielder Otis to right field, and moving Pat Sheridan and Leon Roberts, who had been sharing right field, over to left. In the midst of the shuffle, Wilson had his worst season at the plate to date, batting .276 with two home runs and 33 RBI in 137 games. Although he still finished third in the league with 59 stolen bases and made the All-Star Team for the second time, his on-base percentage and slugging percentage also hit what were to that point career lows at .316 and .352 respectively. However, Wilson's problems in 1983 were not limited to on-field issues.

==== 1984: Drug scandal ====
After the end of the 1983 season, Wilson found himself in a drug scandal along with teammates Willie Aikens, Vida Blue, and Jerry Martin. All four pleaded guilty to misdemeanor drug charges (attempting to purchase cocaine) on November 17. They became the first active major leaguers to serve jail time, serving 81 days at the Fort Worth, Texas, Federal Correctional Institution. He was suspended by commissioner Bowie Kuhn for the entire 1984 season, but the suspension was reduced on appeal and he was able to return on May 15. The Royals traded or released the other three, with only Wilson returning to the Royals. He hit .301 with two home runs and 44 RBI in 128 games, and stole 47 bases in 52 attempts.

=== Remaining Royals career ===
In 1985, Wilson batted .278 with four home runs, 43 RBI and 43 stolen bases in 141 games. He led the league in triples for the third time with a career-high 21. Wilson also gained a measure of redemption from his 1980 World Series performance, hitting .310 (9-for-29) against Toronto in the 1985 ALCS and .367 (11-for-30) against the St. Louis Cardinals in the 1985 World Series. Likely his most notable hit was in Game 5, where he hit a two-out triple to give Kansas City a 4-1 lead in an eventual 6-1 victory in the first of three games the Royals won on their way to their first World Championship.

Wilson remained a fixture in the outfield for the Royals over the next five seasons. Although his hitting was not what it once was, he still hit a career-high nine home runs in 1986, led the league twice more in triples (1987-88) and continued to finish in the top ten in steals, a run of 11 seasons that lasted until 1988, and may have continued had he not missed chunks of the 1989 and 1990 seasons to injuries. He also continued to play well defensively, leading the league in fielding percentage among center fielders in 1987, and among all outfielders in 1990, when he finished the year without a single error.

=== Oakland Athletics ===
Wilson left the Royals following the 1990 season as a free agent, and he was signed by the Oakland Athletics on December 3, 1990. He replaced Félix José, who had been traded late in 1990, as the fourth outfielder behind Rickey Henderson, Dave Henderson and Jose Canseco. He played 113 games, including at least 19 at all three outfield positions, and batted .238 with 28 RBI and 20 stolen bases.

In 1992, Dave Henderson missed most of the season with a hamstring injury, leaving Wilson as the starting center fielder. He played in 132 games, his most since 1988, and batted .270 with 37 RBI and 28 stolen bases. In his first playoff action since the 1985 World Series, he stole seven bases in the 1992 ALCS against the Toronto Blue Jays, tying Lou Brock's record for steals in one post-season (Brock stole seven bases each in the 1967 and 1968 World Series). He batted just .227, however, and the A's lost the series in six games.

=== Chicago Cubs ===
Wilson became a free agent again after the 1992 season, and he signed a two-year contract with the Chicago Cubs on December 18, 1992. He started 1993 in a center field platoon with Dwight Smith, later splitting time with Sammy Sosa when the latter wasn't playing in right field. He batted .258 with one home run and 11 RBI in 105 games, but managed just seven stolen bases—a career-low for a full season. Wilson began the 1994 season on the bench behind Tuffy Rhodes. After playing just 17 games that year and recording a .238 batting average, he was released on May 16, ending his major league career.

Wilson retired with a .285 career batting average and 668 stolen bases, which ranks 12th all-time. For his career, Wilson hit 13 inside-the-park home runs, the most of any major league player playing after 1950. He topped a .300 batting average five times and also led the league in triples five times, being one of only four players to accomplish the feat. Wilson posted a .987 fielding percentage as an outfielder in the majors.

== Post-playing career and honors ==
Wilson coached in the Toronto Blue Jays system in 1995 and 1997. He was elected to the Royals Hall of Fame in 2000. In 2003, Wilson was named manager of the London Monarchs of the fledgling Canadian Baseball League, but the league folded halfway through the season. Wilson also came out of retirement in 2009, signing a one-day contract with the Kansas City T-Bones, a team playing in the independent Northern League. He currently runs the Willie Wilson Baseball Foundation in Kansas City, Missouri.

== See also ==
- List of Major League Baseball stolen base records
- List of Major League Baseball career hits leaders
- List of Major League Baseball career triples leaders
- List of Major League Baseball career runs scored leaders
- List of Major League Baseball batting champions
- List of Major League Baseball career stolen bases leaders
- List of Major League Baseball annual runs scored leaders
- List of Major League Baseball annual stolen base leaders
- List of Major League Baseball annual triples leaders
