= Joe Zdeb =

American baseball player (born 1953)

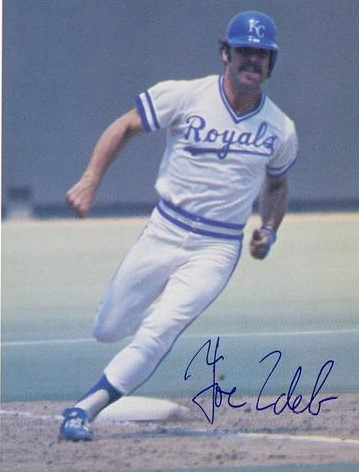
- Left fielder
- Born: June 27, 1953 (age 73); Compton, Illinois, U.S.
- Batted: Right Threw: Right

MLB debut
- April 7, 1977, for the Kansas City Royals

Last MLB appearance
- May 29, 1979, for the Kansas City Royals

MLB statistics
- Batting average: .272
- Home runs: 2
- Runs batted in: 34
- Stats at Baseball Reference

Teams
- Kansas City Royals (1977–1979)

Joseph Edmund Zdeb (/zɛb/ ZEB; born June 27, 1953) is an American former professional baseball outfielder. He played all or part of three seasons in Major League Baseball with the Kansas City Royals from 1977 to 1979, primarily as a left fielder.

== Early life ==
Zdeb attended Maine South High School in Park Ridge, Illinois, where he played both baseball and football. A fullback, he signed a letter of intent to play football at the University of Missouri, with a promise that he would also be allowed to play baseball. However, when he was made the 4th round pick of the Kansas City Royals in the 1971 amateur draft, he chose to join the Royals organization instead.

== Playing career ==
=== Early career ===
In his first season of professional baseball, Zdeb was assigned to the rookie league Billings Mustangs, where he batted.184. He also spent 1972 in rookie ball with the Kingsport Royals, where he improved to a.319 batting average with 12 home runs. In 1973, he began the year at Waterloo in the Midwest League, where he hit.355, earning him a promotion to the high-A San Jose Bees, where he struggled, hitting.195.

In 1974, Zdeb returned to San Jose. In his first full season there, he batted.295. Over the next two seasons, he continued to move up the ladder, playing at Double-A Jacksonville in 1975 and AAA Omaha in 1976.

==== "Long hair" confrontation ====
At some point, during minor league spring training, he showed up to camp with long hair, which was against team policy. Manager Joe Gordon refused to give him a uniform, so he approached general manager Lou Gorman, asking "Mr. Gorman, if I cut my hair, will I become a better ballplayer?" Gorman said he needed to cut it to properly represent the organization, and after initially refusing, he did so a couple days later.

=== Major leagues ===
==== Rookie season: 1977 ====
After the 1976 season, the Royals traded their primary backup outfielder, Jim Wohlford, to the Milwaukee Brewers, opening up a spot for Zdeb. With the left-handed Dave Roberts on the mound for the Detroit Tigers on Opening Day, the right-handed hitting Zdeb wound up starting in left field in place of the left-handed hitting Tom Poquette. Zdeb went 1-for-4 with a run scored in his major league debut.

Zdeb and Poquette platooned over the rest of the season, and the rookie finished with what turned out to be a career high.297 batting average in 105 games. He also had career bests with 2 home runs and 23 RBI. In the 1977 American League Championship Series against the New York Yankees, Zdeb appeared in four of the five games, but failed to get a hit in nine at bats, although he did steal a base.

==== Remaining Royals career ====
In 1978, Zdeb saw his playing time reduced with the arrival of Willie Wilson, and even wound up back in the minors briefly. With three players sharing left field, Zdeb wound up appearing in just 60 games. His batting average fell to .252, without a home run and with just 11 RBI.

With Wilson named the full-time starter in left field for the 1979 season, Zdeb found himself in strictly a reserve role to start the season. After 15 games in which he batted just .174, Zdeb was sent down to the minor leagues. However, he also struggled in Omaha, batting just .224, and was not given a September call-up.

=== Career ending ===
On January 15, 1980, Zdeb was traded to the Chicago White Sox for pitcher Eddie Bane. He finished his professional career that year, splitting the season between the White Sox Iowa Oaks affiliate and the Tidewater Tides in the New York Mets organization. His struggles at the plate continued, as he hit a combined .194, and after the season he was out of professional baseball.

In between, Zdeb played winter ball with the Tigres de Aragua club of the Venezuelan Professional Baseball League in the 1976-77 and 1977-78 seasons.

== Later life and family ==
Zdeb and his wife, Diane, have three children: Rachael, Joey and Josh. Rachael Zdeb attended Mississippi State University, where she was an outfielder for the school's softball team from 2011-2014.
