= Randy McGilberry =

American baseball player (born 1953)

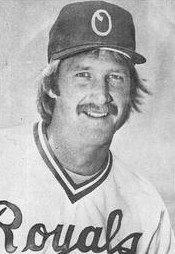
- McGilberry in 1980
- Pitcher
- Born: October 29, 1953 (age 72); Mobile, Alabama, U.S.
- Batted: Both Threw: Right

MLB debut
- September 6, 1977, for the Kansas City Royals

Last MLB appearance
- October 1, 1978, for the Kansas City Royals

MLB statistics
- Win–loss record: 0–2
- Earned run average: 4.41
- Strikeouts: 13
- Stats at Baseball Reference

Teams
- Kansas City Royals (1977–1978)

Randall Kent McGilberry (born October 29, 1953) is a former Major League Baseball pitcher who played for two seasons. He pitched in three games for the Kansas City Royals during the 1977 Kansas City Royals season and 18 games during the 1978 Kansas City Royals season. He attended and played baseball for Satsuma High School and played college baseball at Louisiana Tech University.
