= John Mayberry =

American baseball player (born 1949)

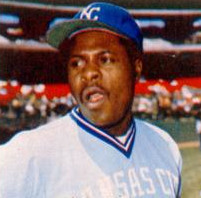
- First baseman
- Born: February 18, 1949 (age 77); Detroit, Michigan, U.S.
- Batted: Left Threw: Left

MLB debut
- September 10, 1968, for the Houston Astros

Last MLB appearance
- September 28, 1982, for the New York Yankees

MLB statistics
- Batting average: .253
- Home runs: 255
- Runs batted in: 879
- Stats at Baseball Reference

Teams
- Houston Astros (1968–1971); Kansas City Royals (1972–1977); Toronto Blue Jays (1978–1982); New York Yankees (1982)

Career highlights and awards
- 2× All-Star (1973, 1974); Kansas City Royals Hall of Fame

John Claiborn Mayberry Sr. (born February 18, 1949) is an American former Major League Baseball player who was active from 1968 to 1982 for the Houston Astros, Kansas City Royals, Toronto Blue Jays and New York Yankees. He was a two-time All Star.

== High school and minor leagues ==
Mayberry attended Northwestern High School, graduating in 1967. He was a gifted high school athlete, playing baseball, football, and basketball at Northwestern; John was twice named to the Detroit News All-State Basketball Team. After graduation, Mayberry was selected by the Houston Astros in the first round (sixth overall) of the 1967 Major League Baseball draft. He was the second first baseman taken in the draft, Ron Blomberg having been selected number one overall by the New York Yankees.

As an 18-year-old, Mayberry was assigned to the Covington Astros of the Appalachian League. While there, he batted .252 in the 1967 season, hitting 4 home runs in 155 at-bats. He continued to develop the following season, making appearances at three different levels of minor league baseball. His batting average for the 1968 season was a robust .320, with a high of .338 in 195 at-bats for the Cocoa Astros of the Florida State League. Between three levels, Mayberry hit 23 home runs and slugged .552. He made his major league debut that season, appearing in four games, although amassed no hits. During his four-game call-up, Mayberry recalled the first time he met Hank Aaron, who was playing for the Atlanta Braves:

"'I just stood there looking at him,' Mayberry said. 'I said to myself, "so this is the Hammer, this is Henry Aaron."'"

At 20 years old, Mayberry played 123 games for the Oklahoma City 89ers of the AAA-level American Association. With 21 home runs, a .303 batting average, and a .522 slugging percentage, his power began to resemble the man he met the year before in the majors. He batted in 78 runs and scored 95, walking more times than he struck out (62/42). Mayberry's second short stint in the majors did not result in his first hit, though he did make it on base with one walk in five plate appearances. That would not come until the following year; after playing 70 games at Oklahoma City and batting .273 with 13 home runs, Mayberry was called up to the Houston Astros.

== Major league career ==
=== Houston Astros ===
Mayberry played in 50 games during his first extended stint in "the Show", with his first career hit coming in April 1970 before he was sent back down to AAA. It came against the San Francisco Giants in a 7–4 loss; he hit a single to right field off Giants right-hander Frank Reberger. The 1971 season was yet another year split between the minor leagues and the major leagues. While he hit .324 with 13 home runs in 64 games in the minors that year, Mayberry could only muster a .182 batting average in 46 games with Houston, hitting seven home runs and striking out 32 times. The Astros tried to turn Mayberry into a slap hitter rather than utilizing his natural power:

"'They wanted me to cut down on my strikeouts,' he said, 'but all long ball hitters seem to strike out a lot, don't they? What happened was that I not only wasn't cutting down on my strikeouts, but I wasn't hitting the long ball any more either.'"

Mayberry was traded along with minor league infielder Dave Grangaard from the Astros to the Kansas City Royals for Jim York and Lance Clemons at the Winter Meetings on December 2, 1971. The trade turned out to be very one-sided in favor of the Royals.

=== Kansas City Royals ===
Mayberry was a classic slugging first baseman who batted left-handed. In his first season with the Royals, he hit 25 home runs and drove in 100 runs. His 78 walks were slightly more than his 74 strikeouts, and his .298 batting average came with the re-discovery of his power stroke. The 1973 season produced nearly identical statistics, but yielded better production. Mayberry led the league in walks (122) and on-base percentage (.417) while still batting .278, hitting 26 home runs, and driving in 100 for the second consecutive season. Mayberry's pure statistics, though, were even more remarkable in light of the fact the Royals had no other power hitters in the lineup to protect him. Other than center fielder Amos Otis, who equaled Mayberry's 1973 home run total, no other Royals batter achieved double-digits in home runs.

Mayberry's best season in Kansas City was in 1975. He set career marks in doubles, home runs, runs scored, and RBI. His 34 home runs in a season were a Royals team record when he retired after the 1982 season. He was named the American League Player of the Month in July 1975 for hitting 12 home runs and posting a .365 batting average, and hit three home runs in a game against future Hall of Famer Ferguson Jenkins. He also had an eight-game stretch during which he hit eight home runs. Mayberry finished second in American League MVP voting, behind Fred Lynn of the Boston Red Sox.

Mayberry's statistics declined drastically in 1976 and 1977. He slumped badly in 1976 with a .232 batting average and only 13 home runs. Mayberry's home run production rebounded in 1977; he hit 23 home runs, earning him a tie for the Royals team lead (with right fielder Al Cowens) in that department. But his batting average remained low at .230, and his RBI total declined from 95 in 1976 to 82 in 1977.

On August 5, 1977, Mayberry went 4-for-5 against the Chicago White Sox, hitting a single off Chris Knapp, a home run and a triple off Bart Johnson, and a double off Don Kirkwood to complete the cycle; the Royals won the game, 12–2.

During the 1977 American League Championship Series against the New York Yankees, Mayberry arrived late for the fourth game, which was played in the afternoon, after a late-night outing. Mayberry played very poorly on both offense (striking out twice in two plate appearances) and defense (dropping a foul pop and a routine infield throw). Mayberry's ragged play prompted manager Whitey Herzog to bench him midway through Game Four and to leave him out of the starting lineup for the decisive fifth game.

Herzog later blamed Mayberry for the Royals' failure to defeat the Yankees in the ALCS and demanded Mayberry's dismissal from the team, even though he also said he had "always loved the way John played". Consequently, before the start of the 1978 season, the Royals sold Mayberry to the Toronto Blue Jays, who were beginning their second season of play in the American League.

=== Toronto Blue Jays ===
Mayberry was with Toronto for the 1978 through 1981 seasons, and part of the 1982 season. With Toronto, hit above .250 only in 1979, and had highs of 30 home runs and 82 RBIs in 1980; his production never returned to his 1975 level. In his last three seasons, Mayberry began to strike out more than walk, a trend that differed from his early career. During his time with the Blue Jays, he played in a total of 549 games, batting .256 with 92 home runs and 272 RBIs. In May 1982, Toronto traded Mayberry to the New York Yankees.

=== New York Yankees ===
Mayberry appeared in 69 games for the Yankees with a .209 average; his playing time was reduced during August and September. Overall for the 1982 season, Mayberry batted .218 with 10 home runs and 30 RBIs. After finishing the season with the Yankees, he retired.

=== Career notes ===
Mayberry was an All-Star twice in his career (1973–1974). In 15 seasons, he compiled a .253 batting average with 255 home runs and 879 RBI. He had 1,379 career hits in 5,447 at bats. He shares the record for most home runs in a season without hitting a double, with 7 in 1971. Upon his retirement, he held both the Royals (34 in 1975) and Blue Jays franchise records for home runs in a single season. Mayberry had a sharp eye at the plate as evidenced by his leading the American League in walks (bases on balls) twice in 1973 and 1975 and leading the American League with Intentional walks (bases on balls) with 17 in 1973. Mayberry still holds several Royals single season records including most walks in a season with 122 (1973), and most home runs on the road with 23 (1975). Defensively, he was very good, recording a .994 fielding percentage playing every inning of his major league career at first base.

== Post-playing career ==
After his retirement, Mayberry spent five years as a coach for the Blue Jays' farm system, two years as a coach for the Royals, and worked for the Royals' Community Affairs Department. He was inducted into the Royals Hall of Fame in 1996.

=== Personal ===
Mayberry's son, John Jr., was an outfielder in major league baseball from 2009 through 2015, mostly with the Philadelphia Phillies. When watching his son's first game at Yankee Stadium, the Fox telecast incorrectly identified Mayberry Sr. in the stands. When told of the incident, John Jr. said, "I got a kick out of that". John Jr. hit his first two career home runs in 2009 against his father's last two teams.

== See also ==
- List of Major League Baseball players to hit for the cycle
- List of Major League Baseball career home run leaders
- List of second-generation Major League Baseball players

Achievements
Preceded by Bob Watson	Hitting for the cycle August 5, 1977	Succeeded by Jack Brohamer
