= Fred White (sportscaster) =

American sportscaster (1936–2013)

Fred White circa 1970s

Fred White (May 29, 1936 – May 15, 2013) was an American sportscaster.

White called Kansas City Royals games for 25 years, from 1974 to 1998, mainly as the number-two announcer alongside Denny Matthews. In addition, he was the voice of the Kansas State Wildcats for many years, as well as being the sports anchor at WIBW-TV in Topeka, Kansas. He also called events for ESPN, CBS, NBC, and TBS.

White was born and raised in Homer, Illinois, and graduated from Eastern Illinois University. On May 14, 2013, The Kansas City Royals announced White was retiring after 40 years with the organization. He died the following day, on May 15, 2013, at the age of 76, due to complications from melanoma.
