= Tom Poquette =

American baseball player (born 1951)

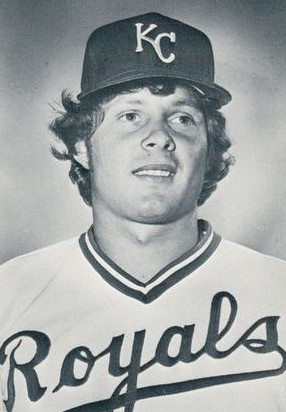
- Outfielder
- Born: October 30, 1951 (age 74); Eau Claire, Wisconsin, U.S.
- Batted: Left Threw: Right

MLB debut
- September 1, 1973, for the Kansas City Royals

Last MLB appearance
- July 9, 1982, for the Kansas City Royals

MLB statistics
- Batting average: .268
- Home runs: 10
- Runs batted in: 136
- Stats at Baseball Reference

Teams
- Kansas City Royals (1973, 1976–1979); Boston Red Sox (1979, 1981); Texas Rangers (1981); Kansas City Royals (1982)

Thomas Arthur Poquette (/poʊˈkɛt/ poh-KET; born October 30, 1951) is an American former outfielder who spent seven seasons in Major League Baseball (MLB) with the Kansas City Royals (1973, 1976–79, 1982), Boston Red Sox (1979, 1981) and Texas Rangers (1981).

== Biography ==
Poquette is a 1970 graduate of Memorial High School in his hometown of Eau Claire, Wisconsin. Playing on the varsity team in three sports, he was a starter in both baseball and football for three years and basketball for two. He was a member of the Wisconsin Interscholastic Athletic Association baseball champions during his sophomore year in 1968. He was honored as one of 25 charter inductees into the school's athletic hall of fame, in 2005. He was also among the second induction class into the Eau Claire Baseball Hall of Fame in 2009.

He was selected in the fourth round (80th overall) by the Royals in the 1970 MLB draft. He was a platoon starter on the Royals' American League (AL) West title teams in 1976, 1977 and 1978 and appeared in the League Championship Series in each of those three years.

Poquette was most noted for an injury he sustained on an inside-the-park grand slam hit by Kevin Bell in the third inning of a 14–8 loss to the Chicago White Sox at Royals Stadium on June 22, 1976. In pursuit of a deep line drive to left field, Poquette was unable to stop because his spikes got caught in the AstroTurf playing surface, and he violently crashed face-first into the outfield wall. He was knocked unconscious and fractured his left cheekbone in four places. After being placed on the disabled list, he was activated by the Royals less than a month later. The stadium's outfield wall was consequently lined with protective cushions to reduce the chances of such an occurrence.

Poquette spent several seasons as a minor league baseball manager in the Royals organization, most recently with the Spokane Indians in 2002.

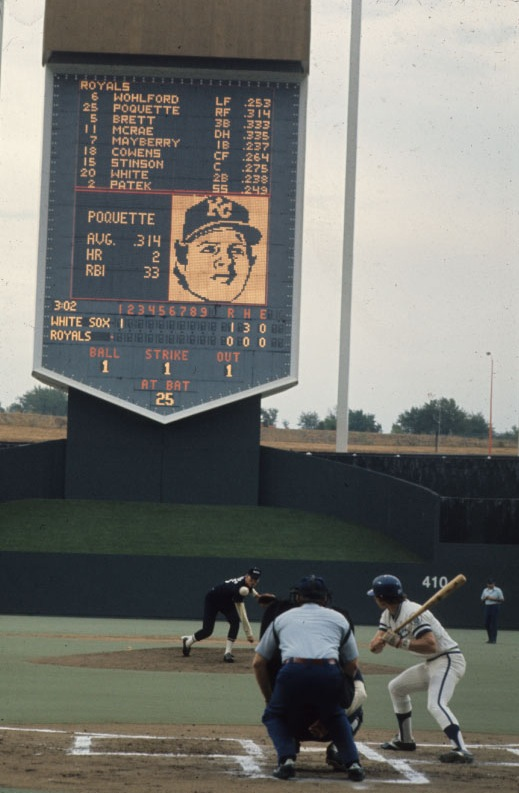
Chris Knapp pitching to Poquette at Royals Stadium on September 19, 1976
