= Doug Bird =

American baseball player (1950–2024)

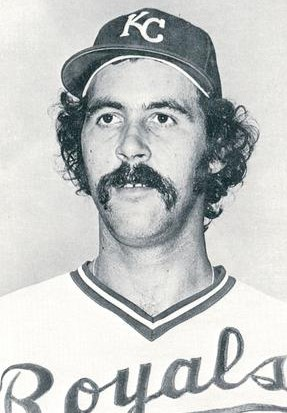
- Bird in 1976
- Pitcher
- Born: March 5, 1950; Corona, California, U.S.
- Died: September 24, 2024 (aged 74); Asheville, North Carolina, U.S.
- Batted: Right Threw: Right

MLB debut
- April 29, 1973, for the Kansas City Royals

Last MLB appearance
- September 10, 1983, for the Boston Red Sox

MLB statistics
- Win–loss record: 73–60
- Earned run average: 3.99
- Strikeouts: 680
- Saves: 60
- Stats at Baseball Reference

Teams
- Kansas City Royals (1973–1978); Philadelphia Phillies (1979); New York Yankees (1980–1981); Chicago Cubs (1981–1982); Boston Red Sox (1983)

James Douglas Bird (March 5, 1950 – September 24, 2024) was an American Major League Baseball pitcher. He played from 1973 to 1983. Bird was drafted by the Kansas City Royals in the third round of the 1969 amateur draft's secondary phase.

== Biography ==
During his career, Bird was used in a variety of pitching roles, frequently shifting from the bullpen to the starting rotation and back. Bird appeared in six postseason games from 1976 through 1978, all with the Royals, and each time against the New York Yankees, posting a 2.35 ERA in 7.2 innings pitched. After good work in the 1976 and 1977 playoffs, Bird surrendered a two-run home run to Thurman Munson in the eighth inning of Game Three during the 1978 American League Championship Series.

Bird died in Asheville, North Carolina on September 24, 2024, at the age of 74.
