= Andy Hassler =

American baseball player (1951–2019)

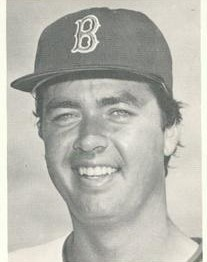
- Pitcher
- Born: October 18, 1951; Texas City, Texas, U.S.
- Died: December 25, 2019 (aged 68); Wickenburg, Arizona, U.S.
- Batted: Left Threw: Left

MLB debut
- May 30, 1971, for the California Angels

Last MLB appearance
- May 7, 1985, for the St. Louis Cardinals

MLB statistics
- Win–loss record: 44–71
- Earned run average: 3.83
- Strikeouts: 630
- Stats at Baseball Reference

Teams
- California Angels (1971, 1973–1976); Kansas City Royals (1976–1978); Boston Red Sox (1978–1979); New York Mets (1979); Pittsburgh Pirates (1980); California Angels (1980–1983); St. Louis Cardinals (1984–1985)

Andrew Earl Hassler (October 18, 1951 – December 25, 2019) was an American Major League Baseball pitcher. He played for the California Angels (1971, 1973–1976 and 1980–1983), Kansas City Royals (1976–1978), Boston Red Sox (1978–1979), New York Mets (1979), Pittsburgh Pirates (1980) and St. Louis Cardinals (1984–1985).

== Career ==
Hassler was drafted in the 25th round of the 1969 amateur draft by the California Angels and made his Major League debut on May 30, 1971, pitching four innings in a 7–4 loss to the New York Yankees.

Hassler was a member of the Royals' American League Western Division winning team in 1976–1977, the Angels team who won the same division in 1982, and he helped the Cardinals win the 1985 National League Pennant. He lost 17 straight games (as a starter and in relief) between 1975 and 1976. Hassler's final Major League appearance was on May 7, 1985, against the San Diego Padres.

In 14 seasons, Hassler had a 44–71 win–loss record and a 3.83 career ERA. Though he played for six teams (including two separate stints with the Angels) during his Major League career, Hassler was never involved in a trade. His contract was purchased several times and he signed as a free agent twice.

Hassler died on December 25, 2019, at his home in Wickenburg, Arizona.
