= Darrell Porter =

American baseball player (1952–2002)

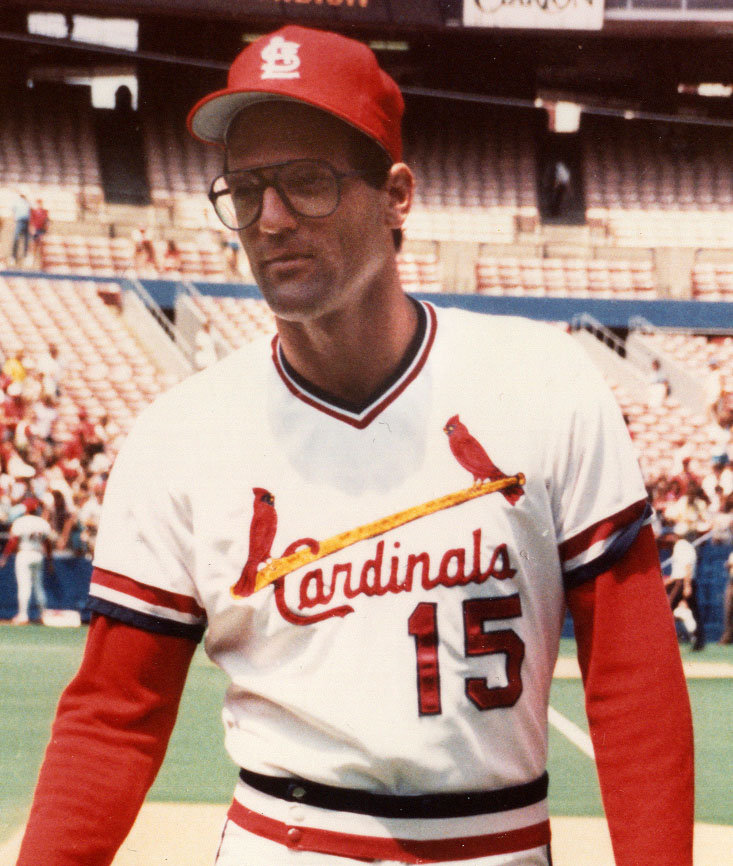
- Porter with the St. Louis Cardinals in 1983
- Catcher
- Born: January 17, 1952; Joplin, Missouri, U.S.
- Died: August 5, 2002 (aged 50); Sugar Creek, Missouri, U.S.
- Batted: Left Threw: Right

MLB debut
- September 2, 1971, for the Milwaukee Brewers

Last MLB appearance
- October 4, 1987, for the Texas Rangers

MLB statistics
- Batting average: .247
- Home runs: 188
- Runs batted in: 826
- Stats at Baseball Reference

Teams
- Milwaukee Brewers (1971–1976); Kansas City Royals (1977–1980); St. Louis Cardinals (1981–1985); Texas Rangers (1986–1987)

Career highlights and awards
- 4× All-Star (1974, 1978–1980); World Series champion (1982); World Series MVP (1982); NLCS MVP (1982); Milwaukee Brewers Wall of Honor

Darrell Ray Porter (January 17, 1952 – August 5, 2002) was an American professional baseball catcher. He played in Major League Baseball (MLB) from 1971 to 1987 for the Milwaukee Brewers, Kansas City Royals, St. Louis Cardinals, and Texas Rangers. The four-time All-Star was known for his excellent defensive skills and power hitting ability. He struggled with, but was never able to overcome, a substance abuse problem. Yet even while a functioning drug addict he went on to become the most valuable player of the 1982 World Series with the St. Louis Cardinals. Porter died from accidental drug toxicity in 2002 at the age of 50.

== Biography ==
=== Playing career ===
1973 photo of Porter for Milwaukee Brewers

Born in Joplin, Missouri, Porter was drafted by the Milwaukee Brewers in the first round (4th overall) of the 1970 Major League Baseball draft out of Southeast High School in Oklahoma City, Oklahoma. He made his major league debut on September 2, 1971, with the Brewers at age 19. He finished third in the 1973 Rookie of the Year voting. Porter was selected to the American League All-Star team in 1974. On December 6, 1976, the Milwaukee Brewers traded Porter along with Jim Colborn to the Kansas City Royals for Jamie Quirk, Jim Wohlford and Bob McClure.

Porter replaced Buck Martinez as the Royals starting catcher. He had the best season of his career in 1979, when he posted a .291 batting average along with 20 home runs, 112 runs batted in, and a league-leading 121 walks. He became only the sixth catcher in Major League history to score 100 runs and have 100 runs batted in. The feat had previously been accomplished by Mickey Cochrane, Yogi Berra, Roy Campanella, Johnny Bench, and Carlton Fisk—all in the Baseball Hall of Fame. Only Porter and Cochrane had 100 walks, 100 runs, and 100 RBI in a single season. He ended the 1979 season ranked third in Wins Above Replacement behind Fred Lynn and his Royals teammate George Brett. With the Royals, he was selected to three consecutive American League All-Star teams.

==== Drug problems ====
Porter told the Associated Press that during the winter of 1979–1980, he became paranoid, and he was convinced by teammates that baseball commissioner Bowie Kuhn—who was known to be tough on drug use—knew about his drug abuse. Porter said he believed that Kuhn was trying to sneak into his house and planned to ban him from baseball for life. Porter found himself sitting up at night in the dark watching out of the front window, waiting for Kuhn to approach while clutching billiard balls and a shotgun.

During spring training in 1980, former Brooklyn Dodgers great, and Los Angeles Dodgers front office advisor - pitcher Don Newcombe paid a visit to the Kansas City clubhouse. He asked the players ten questions, the point of which being if a player answered three or more of the questions with an affirmation, the player might have a problem with drugs or alcohol. Porter affirmed all ten questions and checked himself into a rehabilitation center, admitting he had abused alcohol, cocaine, heroin, LSD, Quaaludes, mescaline, peyote, valium, hashish and marijuana.

==== Later career ====
After checking into the rehab center, Porter became a born-again Christian, married, and became a spokesman for the Fellowship of Christian Athletes. His production on the field declined after rehab, and he never again approached his 1979 levels. He went on to play in three World Series—in 1980 with the Royals and in 1982 and 1985 with the St. Louis Cardinals. Porter won both the 1982 National League Championship Series Most Valuable Player Award and the 1982 World Series MVP Award. At the time, Porter was only the second player in baseball history to win both awards in a single postseason; Willie Stargell of the Pittsburgh Pirates won both awards in 1979. After the 1985 season, the Cardinals released Porter, and he wound up his career with two seasons with the Texas Rangers as a catcher and designated hitter. In 1986 Porter led Major League Baseball with a home run every 12.9 at bats, the best ratio that season for any player with 10 or more home runs. He also broke his ankle during the 1986 season and was on the injured list for eight weeks. He appeared in his final major league game on October 4, 1987, and retired at the age of 35.

=== Personal life ===
Porter was married twice. His first marriage, in 1972 to the former Teri Brown, ended in divorce in 1976. On November 29, 1980, Porter married Deanne Gaulter, who survived him in death. The couple had three children: Lindsey, Jeffrey, and Ryan.

In 1984, Porter wrote an autobiography titled Snap Me Perfect!, in which he detailed his life in baseball and his struggles with substance abuse.

=== Later life and death ===
In 2000, Porter was inducted into the Missouri Sports Hall of Fame.

On August 5, 2002, Porter left his home in Lee's Summit, Missouri, saying he was going to buy a newspaper and go to the park. That afternoon at 5:26 p.m. CDT, he was found dead outside his vehicle in Sugar Creek, Missouri, a suburb of Kansas City. Police found a partially empty cocaine bullet and a used crack pipe in his car. An autopsy found he had died of "toxic effects of cocaine." The autopsy indicated that the level of cocaine in Porter's system—consistent with recreational use—induced a condition called excited delirium (a diagnosis that is now rejected by the medical community) that caused his heart to stop. Police theorized that Porter's car went off a road and got caught on a tree stump in La Benite Park in Sugar Creek. Police say Porter got out of the car, walked to the nearby Missouri River, and then walked back to his car. Authorities had initially speculated that he overheated while trying to push the car off the stump in high heat and humidity, but there was no evidence to indicate that he tried to move the car. The exact details surrounding his death remain unknown.

== Career statistics ==
In a 17-year major league career, Porter played in 1,782 games, accumulating 1,369 hits in 5,539 at bats for a .247 career batting average along with 188 home runs, 826 runs batted in and a .354 on-base percentage. He ended his career with a .982 fielding percentage. As of the 2009 season, he ranked 21st on the all-time list for home runs by a catcher and 20th all-time for RBI by a catcher. Porter caught two no-hitters during his career—Jim Colborn in 1977 and Bob Forsch's second career no-hitter in 1983. Porter was also notable for being one of the few Major League catchers of his time to wear eyeglasses behind the plate at a time when most players needing vision correction were using contact lenses.

== Bibliography ==
- Snap Me Perfect!: The Darrell Porter Story, T. Nelson, 1984. ISBN 0-8407-5367-5. (With William Deerfield.)
