= Hal McRae =

American baseball player and manager (born 1945)

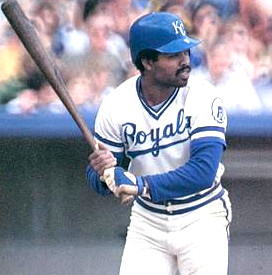
- McRae with the Kansas City Royals in 1980
- Designated hitter / Outfielder / Manager
- Born: July 10, 1945 (age 80); Avon Park, Florida, U.S.
- Batted: Right Threw: Right

MLB debut
- July 11, 1968, for the Cincinnati Reds

Last MLB appearance
- July 17, 1987, for the Kansas City Royals

MLB statistics
- Batting average: .290
- Hits: 2,091
- Home runs: 191
- Runs batted in: 1,097
- Managerial record: 399–473
- Winning %: .458
- Stats at Baseball Reference

Teams
- As player: Cincinnati Reds (1968, 1970–1972); Kansas City Royals (1973–1987); As manager: Kansas City Royals (1991–1994); Tampa Bay Devil Rays (2001–2002); As coach: Kansas City Royals (1987); Montreal Expos (1990–1991); Cincinnati Reds (1995–1996); Philadelphia Phillies (1997–2000); Tampa Bay Rays (2001); St. Louis Cardinals (2005–2009)

Career highlights and awards
- 3× All-Star (1975, 1976, 1982); 2× World Series champion (1985, 2006); Silver Slugger Award (1982); AL RBI leader (1982); Kansas City Royals Hall of Fame

Harold Abraham McRae (/məˈkreɪ/; born July 10, 1945) is an American former designated hitter, outfielder, manager, and coach in Major League Baseball (MLB) who played for the Cincinnati Reds (1968, 1970–72) and Kansas City Royals (1973–87).

Following his 1987 stint on the Royals' coaching staff as a player-coach, McRae managed the team from 1991 to 1994 and later led the Tampa Bay Devil Rays from 2001 to 2002. He also served in various coaching roles between 1990 and 2009 for the Montreal Expos, Cincinnati Reds, Philadelphia Phillies, and St. Louis Cardinals. McRae batted and threw right-handed and is the father of former MLB outfielder Brian McRae.

== Biography ==
=== Playing career ===
McRae was selected by the Cincinnati Reds in the 6th round of the 1965 draft with the 117th overall pick. In the pre-1969 offseason, playing winter ball in Puerto Rico, McRae suffered a multiple leg fracture sliding on the basepaths. In the words of Bill James in The Bill James Historical Baseball Abstract, "Before the accident, McRae was a burner, a center fielder who could fly...after the accident, his speed was major league average." He was considered a below-average outfielder with the Reds.

In spring training 1969, McRae came to the Reds' camp with his leg still in a cast from the fracture. The same offseason, St. Louis Cardinals announcer Harry Caray had suffered multiple fractures being struck by a car while on foot. During a Reds–Cardinals preseason game where Caray was interviewing ballplayers on the field while still on crutches, Reds Manager Dave Bristol pointed in Caray's direction and said to McRae, "Look at that. There's an old man. Broke two legs. Broke his shoulder. Broke his everything. And here he is walking around doing his job, doing anything he wants. Here you are, all you did was break your leg sliding into second base, and you can't get your leg out of your goddam cast! You ought to be ashamed of yourself."

McRae later mentioned to Caray that it was "one of the best motivational speeches he'd ever heard. He learned that he had to want to recover before he'd really be able to." Later in his career, his Kansas City Royals teammate Dan Quisenberry recalled that whenever a Royals player took time off because of injury, "McRae gets dressed like a commando, hides in a trash can in the clubhouse, and then jumps out and 'shoots' the guy...McRae believes that if a guy is hurt and can't play, he's dead to the club, so McRae shoots him and kills him."

McRae was traded along with Wayne Simpson to the Royals for Roger Nelson and Richie Scheinblum on December 1, 1972. McRae developed as a consistent designated hitter in the American League (AL). His playing career spanned 23 years, including 14 seasons with Kansas City. He was selected to the All-Star Game three times, had a batting average over .300 for six seasons with the Royals, and received the Outstanding Designated Hitter Award three times.

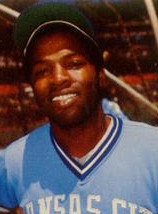
McRae, c. 1977

McRae led the AL batting title race entering the final game of the 1976 regular season which was a 5–3 loss to the Minnesota Twins at Royals Stadium on October 3. He lost out to teammate George Brett .3333 to .3326, with the race decided in the ninth inning when he grounded out to the shortstop immediately after Brett hit an inside-the-park home run to left field. He confronted Twins manager Gene Mauch on the field, with both being restrained by players and umpires. McRae accused Mauch of racism for allegedly ordering left fielder Steve Brye to let Brett's fly ball drop in front of him. His claim was declared unsubstantiated by a post-season league investigation. Oddly, the other two of the top four finishers that season, the Minnesota Twins' Rod Carew and Lyman Bostock, played in that same game. McRae did end up leading the AL with a .407 on-base percentage. The following season, he led the majors with 54 doubles.

After his recovery from the leg fracture, McRae became known as "the most aggressive baserunner of the 1970s," as quoted by James, "a man who left home plate thinking 'double' every time he hit the ball...he taught the younger players and reminded the veterans to take nothing for granted, and to take no prisoners on the bases." In game four of the 1980 World Series, McRae twice turned a seemingly routine single to center field into a two-base hit. McRae played hard—so hard, in fact, that the rule requiring a runner to slide into second base when breaking up a double play is still referred to as the Hal McRae Rule in honor of the man whose cross-body blocks into second base broke up a lot of double plays and second basemen at the same time.

In 1982, McRae had another outstanding year as he led the majors with 46 doubles and 133 runs batted in (RBIs). He finished fourth in AL MVP voting.

In a 19-year major league career, McRae posted a .290 batting average (2091-for-7218) with 191 home runs, 1097 RBIs, 484 doubles, 65 triples and 109 stolen bases in 2084 games played. He added a .351 on-base percentage and a .454 slugging average for a combined .805 OPS.

=== Managerial career ===
Following his playing retirement, McRae managed the Royals (1991–94) and Tampa Bay Devil Rays (2001–02). He also served as hitting coach for the Cincinnati Reds, Philadelphia Phillies, and St. Louis Cardinals. McRae, who won a World Series ring playing for Kansas City against the Cardinals in 1985, won a ring as a coach for the Cardinals when they defeated the Detroit Tigers in the 2006 World Series, four games to one.

McRae is perhaps well known for a profanity-laced tirade he went on as Royals' manager early in the 1993 season while being interviewed by reporters after a Royals loss. The tantrum included throwing numerous objects around his office, including a cup of Coke and his office phone, and one reporter left McRae's office with a bloodied face. The tirade was captured on video and widely disseminated at the time. A video of the meltdown was later uploaded to YouTube and has 1.5 million views as of July 2024. McRae managed the Royals for one more season before he was fired after the 1994 season.

== Managerial records ==
Team	Year	Regular season					Postseason			
Team	Year	Games	Won	Lost	Win %	Finish	Won	Lost	Win %	Result
KC	1991	124	66	58	.532	6th in AL West	–	–	–	–
KC	1992	162	72	90	.444	5th in AL West	–	–	–	–
KC	1993	162	84	78	.519	3rd in AL West	–	–	–	–
KC	1994	115	64	51	.557	3rd in AL Central	–	–	–	–
KC total		563	286	277	.508		0	0	–	
TB	2001	148	58	90	.392	5th in AL East	–	–	–	–
TB	2002	161	55	106	.342	5th in AL East	–	–	–	–
TB total		309	113	196	.366		0	0	–	
Total		872	399	473	.458		0	0	–	

== See also ==
- List of Major League Baseball annual doubles leaders
- List of St. Louis Cardinals coaches
- Holy Cow! - Harry Caray with Bob Verdi. Publisher: Villard Books, 1989. Format: Hardcover, 252 pp. Language: English. ISBN 0-394-55103-6
- The ESPN Baseball Encyclopedia – Gary Gillette, Peter Gammons, Pete Palmer. Publisher: Sterling Publishing, 2005. Format: Paperback, 1824pp. Language: English. ISBN 1-4027-4771-3
- The New Bill James Historical Baseball Abstract - Bill James. Publisher: Free Press, 2001. Format: Paperback, 1014 pp. Language: English. ISBN 0-7432-2722-0
- Baseball Confidential - Bruce Nash and Allan Zullo. Publisher: Pocket Books, 1988. Format: Paperback, 224 pp. Language: English. ISBN 0-671-65832-8

Sporting positions
Preceded by Bill Russell	Tampa Bay Devil Rays Bench Coach; 2001	Succeeded by Billy Hatcher
