= Amos Otis =

American baseball player (born 1947)

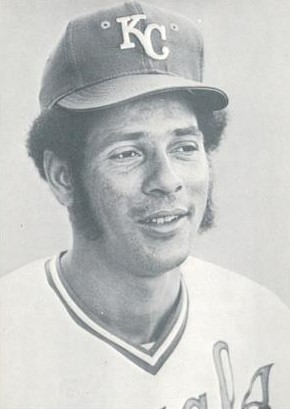
- Center fielder
- Born: April 26, 1947 (age 79); Mobile, Alabama, U.S.
- Batted: Right Threw: Right

MLB debut
- September 6, 1967, for the New York Mets

Last MLB appearance
- August 5, 1984, for the Pittsburgh Pirates

MLB statistics
- Batting average: .277
- Hits: 2,020
- Home runs: 193
- Runs batted in: 1,007
- Stats at Baseball Reference

Teams
- New York Mets (1967, 1969); Kansas City Royals (1970–1983); Pittsburgh Pirates (1984)

Career highlights and awards
- 5× All-Star (1970–1973, 1976); 3× Gold Glove Award (1971, 1973, 1974); AL stolen base leader (1971); Kansas City Royals Hall of Fame

Amos Joseph Otis (born April 26, 1947) is an American former professional baseball player and coach. He played in Major League Baseball as a center fielder from 1967 to 1984, most prominently as an integral member of the Kansas City Royals team that won the franchise's first American League Western Division championship in 1976, and their first American League pennant in 1980. Although the Royals lost the 1980 World Series in six games to the Philadelphia Phillies, Otis produced a.478 batting average with three home runs in what would be his only World Series appearance.

A five-time All-Star, Otis twice led the American League in doubles and once led the league in stolen bases. He was considered one of the best center fielders of his era, using his speed to earn three Gold Glove Awards. He ranks tenth among center fielders in Major League Baseball history in career putouts. He was named Royals Player of the Year three times and, finished among the Royals all-time leaders in hits (1,977), home runs (193), runs scored (1,074), stolen bases (340) and games played (1,891).

Otis also played for the New York Mets and the Pittsburgh Pirates. After his playing career, he continued to work as a hitting instructor. Otis was inducted into the Kansas City Royals Hall of Fame in 1986.

== Professional baseball career ==
Otis was initially drafted by the Boston Red Sox in the fifth round of the 1965 Major League Baseball draft as a shortstop. However, he spent time in the outfield, third base, and first base while playing in the minors. In November 1966, the Mets drafted him and he jumped all the way to Triple-A in 1967. He saw some time with the Mets late in the 1967 season, but he spent 1968 at Triple-A again before making the major league roster in 1969. He was part of a trade package along with Ed Kranepool and Bob Heise when the Mets attempted to acquire the Braves' Joe Torre, who was later traded to the St. Louis Cardinals for Orlando Cepeda instead.

Otis immediately clashed with Mets manager Gil Hodges, who tried to make him a third baseman. After four games, Otis was sent back to the minors for a month. On December 3, 1969, Royals general manager Cedric Tallis sent third baseman Joe Foy to the Mets in exchange for the young Otis and pitcher Bob Johnson. The trade proved to be heavily lopsided in the Royals' favor. Foy was bogged down by drug problems and was out of baseball by 1971. Meanwhile, the Royals immediately made Otis the starting center fielder, and he stayed there for most of the 1970s.

Otis made the American League All-Star team in each of his first four years with the team and won three Gold Gloves. His speed worked well with the Royals' team philosophy of speed and defense. On September 7, 1971, he became the first player since 1927 to steal five bases in one game. He led the American League with 52 stolen bases that year. Otis scored the final run ever at Kansas City's Municipal Stadium in the fifth inning on October 4, 1972.

Otis hit as many as 26 homers in a season, recorded 90 RBI or more three times, twice led the AL in doubles and once in stolen bases with 52. He compiled a career total of 341 steals, while being caught stealing 93 times. Otis was a clutch performer, and he consistently produced for the Royals as the team became a perennial contender.

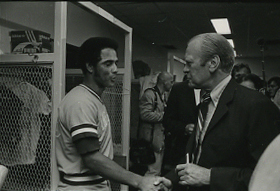
Otis (left) with Gerald Ford in 1976

On September 12, 1977, Otis helped eight youths who were stranded after a Royals game had been rained out when flooding prevented the boys' parents picking them up. He brought them out to eat, then to his house to spend the night. The following day he brought each one home. "If it was my kids", Otis said, "I would have wanted someone to do something for them, too."

Otis hit.478 with three home runs and 7 RBI in six games during the 1980 World Series. He set a record for putouts in a game by an outfielder in Game 3, a contest in which he also homered. He is one of two players (along with Alex Bregman in 2017) to drive in a run in each of his first five World Series games.

Later in his career, Otis' offense began to decline, in part due to a hand injury. By the late 1970s and early 1980s, his fielding skills had diminished, and he lost his center field job to Willie Wilson near the end of his long run with the Royals. In 1983, he left the team before the season ended when told he was not in the Royals' future plans.

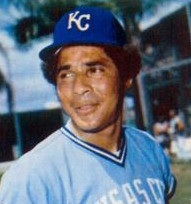
Otis, circa 1977

On December 19, 1983, Otis signed a one-year contract with the Pittsburgh Pirates. He played in 40 games with Pittsburgh, batting just.165 with 10 RBI. On August 5, 1984, Otis was released by the Pirates.

In a 17-season career, Otis posted a.277 batting average, with 193 home runs and 1,007 RBI in 1,998 games while stealing 341 bases. Defensively, he recorded a.991 fielding percentage and 126 assists, primarily as a center fielder.

Otis worked for the San Diego Padres and Colorado Rockies as a hitting instructor, later retiring to Las Vegas. Otis still attends Royals reunions, and dons a uniform to play in alumni games.

In the early 1990s, Otis admitted that he used a corked bat during his entire time with Royals. He noted that it was a widespread practice in the major leagues.

== See also ==
- List of Major League Baseball career hits leaders
- List of Major League Baseball career runs scored leaders
- List of Major League Baseball career runs batted in leaders
- List of Major League Baseball career stolen bases leaders
- List of Major League Baseball annual stolen base leaders
- List of Major League Baseball annual doubles leaders
