= List of New York Yankees broadcasters =

As one of the most successful clubs in Major League Baseball, the New York Yankees are also one of its oldest teams. Part of that success derives to its radio and television broadcasts that have been running beginning in 1939 when the first radio transmissions were broadcast from the old stadium, and from 1947 when television broadcasts began. They have been one of the pioneer superstation broadcasts when WPIX became a national superstation in 1978 and were the first American League team to broadcast their games on cable, both first in 1978 and later on in 1979, when Sportschannel NY (now MSG Plus) began broadcasting Yankees games to cable subscribers. Today, the team can be heard and/or seen in its gameday broadcasts during the baseball season on:

- TV: YES Network, or Amazon Prime Video in New York
- Radio: WFAN (660 AM) and WFAN-FM (101.9 FM) in New York; New York Yankees Radio Network; WADO (1280 AM) (Spanish) (Cadena Radio Yankees)

Longest serving Yankee broadcasters (all-time with 10+ years)

Phil Rizzuto (40 yrs), John Sterling (36 yrs), Michael Kay (34 yrs), Suzyn Waldman (31 yrs), Mel Allen (30 yrs), Ken Singleton (25 yrs), Paul O'Neill (24 yrs), Bobby Murcer (22 yrs), Frank Messer (18 yrs), Bill White (18 yrs), John Flaherty (20 yrs), David Cone (18 yrs), Red Barber (13 yrs), Jim Kaat (13 yrs), Al Trautwig (12 yrs)

== Broadcast announcers ==
Broadcasters assigned from the Yankees to cover World Series appearances nationally (1947–1978)

- 1947 – Mel Allen (radio via Mutual)
- 1949 – Mel Allen (radio via Mutual)
- 1950 – Mel Allen (radio via Mutual)
- 1951 – Mel Allen (radio via Mutual)
- 1952 – Mel Allen (TV via NBC)
- 1953 – Mel Allen (TV via NBC)
- 1955 – Mel Allen (TV via NBC)
- 1956 – Mel Allen (TV via NBC)
- 1957 – Mel Allen (TV via NBC)
- 1958 – Mel Allen (TV via NBC)
- 1960 – Mel Allen (TV via NBC)
- 1961 – Mel Allen (TV via NBC)
- 1962 – Mel Allen (TV via NBC)
- 1963 – Mel Allen (TV via NBC)
- 1964 – Phil Rizzuto (TV and radio via NBC)
- 1976 – Phil Rizzuto (TV via NBC); Bill White (radio via CBS)
- 1977 – Bill White (radio via CBS)
- 1978 – Bill White (radio via CBS)

=== Television Broadcasters by Year ===
New York Yankees television broadcasters and outlets, 1947–present
Year	TV	Play-by-play	Commentators	Cable	Play-by-play	Commentators
1947	WABD	Mel Allen; Russ Hodges				
1948	WABD	Mel Allen; Russ Hodges; Bill Slater				
1949	WABD	Mel Allen; Curt Gowdy				
1950	WABD	Mel Allen; Curt Gowdy	Dizzy Dean			
1951	WABD; WPIX	Mel Allen; Bill Crowley; Art Gleeson	Dizzy Dean			
1952	WPIX	Mel Allen; Bill Crowley; Art Gleeson	Joe DiMaggio			
1953	WPIX	Mel Allen; Jim Woods; Joe E. Brown				
1954	WPIX	Mel Allen; Red Barber; Jim Woods				
1955	WPIX	Mel Allen; Red Barber; Jim Woods				
1956	WPIX	Mel Allen; Red Barber; Jim Woods				
1957	WPIX	Mel Allen; Red Barber; Phil Rizzuto				
1958	WPIX	Mel Allen; Red Barber; Phil Rizzuto				
1959	WPIX	Mel Allen; Red Barber; Phil Rizzuto				
1960	WPIX	Mel Allen; Red Barber; Phil Rizzuto				
1961	WPIX	Mel Allen; Red Barber; Phil Rizzuto				
1962	WPIX	Mel Allen; Red Barber; Phil Rizzuto				
1963	WPIX	Mel Allen; Red Barber; Phil Rizzuto; Jerry Coleman				
1964	WPIX	Mel Allen; Red Barber; Phil Rizzuto; Jerry Coleman				
1965	WPIX	Red Barber; Phil Rizzuto; Jerry Coleman; Joe Garagiola				
1966	WPIX	Red Barber; Phil Rizzuto; Jerry Coleman; Joe Garagiola				
1967	WPIX	Phil Rizzuto; Jerry Coleman; Joe Garagiola				
1968	WPIX	Phil Rizzuto; Jerry Coleman; Frank Messer				
1969	WPIX	Phil Rizzuto; Jerry Coleman; Frank Messer	Whitey Ford			
1970	WPIX	Phil Rizzuto; Frank Messer; Bob Gamere	Whitey Ford			
1971	WPIX	Phil Rizzuto; Frank Messer; Bill White	Whitey Ford			
1972	WPIX	Phil Rizzuto; Frank Messer; Bill White				
1973	WPIX	Phil Rizzuto; Frank Messer; Bill White				
1974	WPIX	Phil Rizzuto; Frank Messer; Bill White				
1975	WPIX	Phil Rizzuto; Frank Messer; Bill White				
1976	WPIX	Phil Rizzuto; Frank Messer; Bill White				
1977	WPIX	Phil Rizzuto; Frank Messer; Bill White				
1978	WPIX	Phil Rizzuto; Frank Messer; Bill White				
1979	WPIX	Phil Rizzuto; Frank Messer; Bill White		SportsChannel NY	Phil Rizzuto; Frank Messer; Bill White	
1980	WPIX	Phil Rizzuto; Frank Messer; Bill White		SportsChannel NY	Phil Rizzuto; Frank Messer; Bill White	
1981	WPIX	Phil Rizzuto; Frank Messer; Bill White		SportsChannel NY	Phil Rizzuto; Frank Messer; Bill White	
1982	WPIX	Phil Rizzuto; Frank Messer; Bill White		SportsChannel NY	Mel Allen; Phil Rizzuto; Frank Messer; Fran Healy; Bill White	
1983	WPIX	Phil Rizzuto; Frank Messer; Bill White	Bobby Murcer	SportsChannel NY	Mel Allen; Phil Rizzuto; Frank Messer; Fran Healy; Bill White	Bobby Murcer
1984	WPIX	Phil Rizzuto; Frank Messer; Bill White	Bobby Murcer	SportsChannel NY	Mel Allen; Phil Rizzuto; Bill White	Bobby Murcer
1985	WPIX	Phil Rizzuto; Spencer Ross; Bill White		SportsChannel NY	Mel Allen; Phil Rizzuto; Bill White	Mickey Mantle
1986	WPIX	Phil Rizzuto; Bill White; Jim Kaat	Billy Martin	SportsChannel NY	Mel Allen; Phil Rizzuto; Bill White	Mickey Mantle
1987	WPIX	Phil Rizzuto; Bill White	Billy Martin	SportsChannel NY	Spencer Ross; Ken Harrelson	Mickey Mantle
1988	WPIX	Phil Rizzuto; Bill White		SportsChannel NY	Ken Harrelson; Bobby Murcer	Mickey Mantle
1989	WPIX	Phil Rizzuto; George Grande; Tom Seaver		MSG Network	Bobby Murcer; Tommy Hutton	Lou Piniella
1990	WPIX	Phil Rizzuto; George Grande; Tom Seaver		MSG Network	Dewayne Staats; Tony Kubek; Al Trautwig	
1991	WPIX	Phil Rizzuto; Bobby Murcer; Tom Seaver		MSG Network	Dewayne Staats; Tony Kubek; Al Trautwig	
1992	WPIX	Phil Rizzuto; Bobby Murcer; Tom Seaver		MSG Network	Dewayne Staats; Tony Kubek; Al Trautwig	
1993	WPIX	Phil Rizzuto; Bobby Murcer; Tom Seaver		MSG Network	Dewayne Staats; Tony Kubek; Al Trautwig	
1994	WPIX	Phil Rizzuto; Bobby Murcer; Paul Olden		MSG Network	Dewayne Staats; Tony Kubek; Al Trautwig	
1995	WPIX	Phil Rizzuto; Bobby Murcer; Paul Olden		MSG Network	Dave Cohen; Jim Kaat; Al Trautwig	
1996	WPIX	Phil Rizzuto; Bobby Murcer; Rick Cerone		MSG Network	Dave Cohen; Jim Kaat; Al Trautwig	
1997	WPIX	Bobby Murcer; Ken Singleton	Rick Cerone	MSG Network	Jim Kaat; Ken Singleton; Al Trautwig	Suzyn Waldman
1998	WPIX	Bobby Murcer; Ken Singleton	Tommy John	MSG Network	Jim Kaat; Ken Singleton; Al Trautwig	Suzyn Waldman
1999	WNYW	Bobby Murcer	Tim McCarver	MSG Network	Jim Kaat; Ken Singleton; Al Trautwig	Suzyn Waldman
2000	WNYW	Bobby Murcer	Tim McCarver	MSG Network	Jim Kaat; Ken Singleton; Al Trautwig	Suzyn Waldman
2001	WNYW	Bobby Murcer	Tim McCarver	MSG Network	Jim Kaat; Ken Singleton; Al Trautwig	Suzyn Waldman
2002	WCBS-TV	Michael Kay; Ken Singleton; Bobby Murcer	Jim Kaat; David Cone; Paul O'Neill	YES Network	Michael Kay; Ken Singleton; Bobby Murcer	Jim Kaat; David Cone; Paul O'Neill
2003	WCBS-TV	Michael Kay; Ken Singleton; Bobby Murcer	Jim Kaat; Paul O'Neill	YES Network	Michael Kay; Ken Singleton; Bobby Murcer	Jim Kaat; Paul O'Neill
2004	WWOR-TV	Michael Kay; Ken Singleton; Bobby Murcer	Jim Kaat; Paul O'Neill; Joe Girardi	YES Network	Michael Kay; Ken Singleton; Bobby Murcer	Jim Kaat; Paul O'Neill; Joe Girardi
2005	WWOR-TV	Michael Kay; Ken Singleton; Bobby Murcer	Jim Kaat; Paul O'Neill; David Justice	YES Network	Michael Kay; Ken Singleton; Bobby Murcer	Jim Kaat; Paul O'Neill; David Justice
2006	WWOR-TV	Michael Kay; Ken Singleton; Bobby Murcer	Jim Kaat; Paul O'Neill; David Justice; Al Leiter; John Flaherty	YES Network	Michael Kay; Ken Singleton; Bobby Murcer	Jim Kaat; Paul O'Neill; David Justice; Al Leiter; John Flaherty
2007	WWOR-TV	Michael Kay; Ken Singleton; Bobby Murcer	Paul O'Neill; David Justice; Al Leiter; John Flaherty; Joe Girardi	YES Network	Michael Kay; Ken Singleton; Bobby Murcer	Paul O'Neill; David Justice; Al Leiter; John Flaherty; Joe Girardi
2008	WWOR-TV	Michael Kay; Ken Singleton; Bobby Murcer	Paul O'Neill; Al Leiter; John Flaherty; David Cone	YES Network	Michael Kay; Ken Singleton; Bobby Murcer	Paul O'Neill; Al Leiter; John Flaherty; David Cone
2009	WWOR-TV	Michael Kay; Ken Singleton	Paul O'Neill; Al Leiter; John Flaherty; David Cone	YES Network	Michael Kay; Ken Singleton	Paul O'Neill; Al Leiter; John Flaherty; David Cone
2010	WWOR-TV	Michael Kay; Ken Singleton; Bob Lorenz	Paul O'Neill; Al Leiter; John Flaherty; David Cone	YES Network	Michael Kay; Ken Singleton; Bob Lorenz	Paul O'Neill; Al Leiter; John Flaherty; David Cone
2011	WWOR-TV	Michael Kay; Ken Singleton; Bob Lorenz	Paul O'Neill; Al Leiter; John Flaherty; David Cone	YES Network	Michael Kay; Ken Singleton; Bob Lorenz	Paul O'Neill; Al Leiter; John Flaherty; David Cone
2012	WWOR-TV	Michael Kay; Ken Singleton; Bob Lorenz	Paul O'Neill; Al Leiter; John Flaherty; David Cone; Lou Piniella	YES Network	Michael Kay; Ken Singleton; Bob Lorenz	Paul O'Neill; Al Leiter; John Flaherty; David Cone; Lou Piniella
2013	WWOR-TV	Michael Kay; Ken Singleton; Bob Lorenz	Paul O'Neill; Al Leiter; John Flaherty; David Cone; Lou Piniella	YES Network	Michael Kay; Ken Singleton; Bob Lorenz	Paul O'Neill; Al Leiter; John Flaherty; David Cone; Lou Piniella
2014	WWOR-TV	Michael Kay; Ken Singleton; Bob Lorenz	Paul O'Neill; Al Leiter; John Flaherty; David Cone	YES Network	Michael Kay; Ken Singleton; Bob Lorenz	Paul O'Neill; Al Leiter; John Flaherty; David Cone
2015	WPIX	Michael Kay; Ken Singleton; Ryan Ruocco; Bob Lorenz	Paul O'Neill; Al Leiter; John Flaherty; David Cone	YES Network	Michael Kay; Ken Singleton; Ryan Ruocco; Bob Lorenz	Paul O'Neill; Al Leiter; John Flaherty; David Cone
2016	WPIX	Michael Kay; Ken Singleton; Ryan Ruocco	Paul O'Neill; Al Leiter; John Flaherty; David Cone	YES Network	Michael Kay; Ken Singleton; Ryan Ruocco	Paul O'Neill; Al Leiter; John Flaherty; David Cone
2017	WPIX	Michael Kay; Ken Singleton; Ryan Ruocco	Paul O'Neill; Al Leiter; John Flaherty; David Cone	YES Network	Michael Kay; Ken Singleton; Ryan Ruocco	Paul O'Neill; Al Leiter; John Flaherty; David Cone
2018	WPIX	Michael Kay; Ken Singleton; Ryan Ruocco	Paul O'Neill; Al Leiter; John Flaherty; David Cone	YES Network	Michael Kay; Ken Singleton; Ryan Ruocco	Paul O'Neill; Al Leiter; John Flaherty; David Cone
2019	WPIX	Michael Kay; Ryan Ruocco; Ken Singleton; John Flaherty	Paul O'Neill; David Cone; Jeff Nelson	YES Network	Michael Kay; Ryan Ruocco; Ken Singleton; John Flaherty	Paul O'Neill; David Cone; Jeff Nelson
2020				YES Network	Michael Kay; Ryan Ruocco; Ken Singleton	Ken Singleton; Paul O'Neill; John Flaherty; David Cone; Jeff Nelson
2021	WPIX; Amazon Prime	Michael Kay; Ryan Ruocco; Ken Singleton	Paul O'Neill; John Flaherty; David Cone	YES Network	Michael Kay; Ryan Ruocco; Ken Singleton	Paul O'Neill; John Flaherty; David Cone
2022	Amazon Prime	Michael Kay; Ryan Ruocco	Paul O'Neill; John Flaherty; David Cone; Carlos Beltrán; Cameron Maybin; Jeff Nelson	YES Network	Michael Kay; Ryan Ruocco	Paul O'Neill; John Flaherty; David Cone; Carlos Beltrán; Cameron Maybin; Jeff Nelson
2023	Amazon Prime	Michael Kay; Ryan Ruocco	David Cone; Paul O'Neill; John Flaherty; Jeff Nelson	YES Network	Michael Kay; Ryan Ruocco	David Cone; Paul O'Neill; John Flaherty; Jeff Nelson
2024	Amazon Prime	Michael Kay; Ryan Ruocco	David Cone; Paul O'Neill; John Flaherty; Jeff Nelson	YES Network	Michael Kay; Ryan Ruocco	David Cone; Paul O'Neill; John Flaherty; Jeff Nelson
2025	Amazon Prime	Michael Kay; Ryan Ruocco; Justin Shackil	David Cone; Paul O'Neill; Joe Girardi; John Flaherty; Jeff Nelson	YES Network	Michael Kay; Ryan Ruocco; Justin Shackil	David Cone; Paul O'Neill; Joe Girardi; John Flaherty; Jeff Nelson

=== Television Play-by-Play ===
- Mel Allen β, 1939–1940, 1942, 1946–1964 (WPIX), 1979–1986 (SportsChannel)
- Russ Hodges β, 1946–1948 (WPIX)
- Curt Gowdy β, 1949–1950 (WPIX)
- Jim Woods, 1953–1956 (WPIX)
- Red Barber β, 1954–1966 (WPIX)
- Phil Rizzuto, 1957–1996 (WPIX)
- Jerry Coleman β, 1963–1969 (WPIX)
- Joe Garagiola β, 1965–1967 (WPIX)
- Frank Messer, 1968–1984 (WPIX)
- Bob Gamere, 1970 (WPIX)
- Bill White, 1971–1988 (WPIX)
- Bobby Murcer, 1983–1984, 1991–1998 (WPIX), 1988 (SportsChannel), 1989 (MSG), 1999–2001 (FOX5), 2002–2008 (YES)
- Spencer Ross, 1985 (WPIX), 1987 (SportsChannel)
- George Grande, 1989–1990 (WPIX)
- Greg Gumbel, 1989 (MSG)
- Tommy Hutton, 1989 (MSG)
- Dewayne Staats, 1990–1994 (MSG)
- Al Trautwig, 1990–2001 (MSG)
- Paul Olden, 1994–1995 (WPIX)
- Dave Cohen, 1995–1996 (MSG)
- Ken Singleton, 1997–2001 (MSG), 2002–2021 (YES)
- Michael Kay, 2002–present (YES)
- Bob Lorenz, 2010–present (YES)
- Ryan Ruocco, 2015–present (YES)

=== Television analyst ===
- Dizzy Dean, 1950–1951 (WPIX)
- Joe DiMaggio, 1952 (WPIX)
- Joe Garagiola β, 1965–1967 (WPIX)
- Jerry Coleman β, 1963–1969 (WPIX)
- Whitey Ford, 1969–1971 (WPIX)
- Fran Healy, 1979–1983 (SportsChannel)
- Billy Martin, 1986–1987 (WPIX)
- Ken Harrelson, 1987–1988 (SportsChannel)
- Mickey Mantle, 1985–1988 (SportsChannel)
- Bill White, 1971–1988 (WPIX)
- Tom Seaver, 1989–1993 (WPIX)
- Tony Kubek β, 1990–1994 (MSG)
- Phil Rizzuto, 1957–1996 (WPIX)
- Rick Cerone, 1996–1997 (WPIX)
- Tommy John, 1998 (WPIX)
- Tim McCarver β, 1999–2001 (WNYW)
- Jim Kaat, 1986 (WPIX), 1995–2001 (MSG), 2002–2006 (YES)
- Joe Girardi, 2004, 2007 (YES)
- David Justice, 2005–2007 (YES)
- Bobby Murcer, 1983–1984, 1991–1998 (WPIX), 1997–2001 (MSG), 2002–2008 (YES)
- Tino Martinez, 2010 (YES)
- Lou Piniella, 1989 (MSG), 2012–2013 (YES)
- Al Leiter, 2006–2018 (YES)
- Ken Singleton, 1997–2001 (MSG), 2002–2021 (YES)
- David Cone, 2002, 2008–2009, 2011–present (YES)
- John Flaherty, 2006–present (YES)
- Paul O'Neill, 2002–present (YES)
- Carlos Beltrán, 2022 (YES)
- Cameron Maybin, 2022 (YES)

β - indicates Ford C. Frick Award winner

=== Radio ===
Longest serving Yankee radio broadcasters (all-time with 10+ years)

John Sterling (36 yrs), Phil Rizzuto (30 yrs), Mel Allen (22 yrs), Suzyn Waldman (20 yrs), Frank Messer (18 yrs), Beto Villa (16 yrs), Bill White (16 yrs), Red Barber (13 yrs), Michael Kay (10 yrs)

New York Yankees radio broadcasters and outlets, 1939–present
Year	Radio	Commentators
1939	WABC (Note: Renamed WCBS in 1946. Not to be confused with the current WABC, which adopted its callsign in 1953.)	Arch McDonald; Garnett Marks; Mel Allen
1940	WABC	Mel Allen; Jay C. Flippen
1942	WOR	Mel Allen; Connie Desmond
1944	WINS	Don Dunphy; Bill Slater
1945	WINS	Al Helfer; Bill Slater
1946	WINS	Mel Allen; Russ Hodges
1947	WINS	Mel Allen; Russ Hodges
1948	WINS	Mel Allen; Russ Hodges
1949	WINS	Mel Allen; Curt Gowdy
1950	WINS	Mel Allen; Curt Gowdy
1951	WINS	Mel Allen; Bill Crowley; Art Gleeson; Dizzy Dean
1952	WINS	Mel Allen; Bill Crowley; Art Gleeson
1953	WINS	Mel Allen; Joe E. Brown; Jim Woods
1954	WINS	Mel Allen; Red Barber; Jim Woods
1955	WINS	Mel Allen; Red Barber; Jim Woods
1956	WINS	Mel Allen; Red Barber; Jim Woods
1957	WINS	Mel Allen; Red Barber; Phil Rizzuto
1958	WMGM	Mel Allen; Red Barber; Phil Rizzuto
1959	WMGM	Mel Allen; Red Barber; Phil Rizzuto
1960	WMGM	Mel Allen; Red Barber; Phil Rizzuto
1961	WCBS	Mel Allen; Red Barber; Phil Rizzuto
1962	WCBS	Mel Allen; Red Barber; Phil Rizzuto
1963	WCBS	Mel Allen; Red Barber; Phil Rizzuto; Jerry Coleman
1964	WCBS	Mel Allen; Red Barber; Phil Rizzuto; Jerry Coleman
1965	WCBS	Red Barber; Phil Rizzuto; Jerry Coleman; Joe Garagiola
1966	WCBS	Red Barber; Phil Rizzuto; Jerry Coleman; Joe Garagiola
1967	WHN	Phil Rizzuto; Jerry Coleman; Joe Garagiola
1968	WHN	Phil Rizzuto; Frank Messer; Jerry Coleman
1969	WHN	Phil Rizzuto; Frank Messer; Jerry Coleman
1970	WHN	Phil Rizzuto; Frank Messer; Bob Gamere
1971	WMCA	Phil Rizzuto; Frank Messer; Bill White
1972	WMCA	Phil Rizzuto; Frank Messer; Bill White
1973	WMCA	Phil Rizzuto; Frank Messer; Bill White
1974	WMCA	Phil Rizzuto; Frank Messer; Bill White
1975	WMCA	Phil Rizzuto; Frank Messer; Bill White; Dom Valentino
1976	WMCA	Phil Rizzuto; Frank Messer; Bill White
1977	WMCA	Phil Rizzuto; Frank Messer; Bill White
1978	WINS	Phil Rizzuto; Frank Messer; Bill White; Fran Healy
1979	WINS	Phil Rizzuto; Frank Messer; Bill White; Fran Healy
1980	WINS	Phil Rizzuto; Frank Messer; Bill White; Fran Healy
1981	WABC	Phil Rizzuto; Frank Messer; Bill White; Fran Healy
1982	WABC	Phil Rizzuto; Frank Messer; Bill White; John Gordon
1983	WABC	Phil Rizzuto; Frank Messer; Bill White; John Gordon
1984	WABC	Phil Rizzuto; Frank Messer; Bill White; Bobby Murcer; John Gordon
1985	WABC	Frank Messer; John Gordon; Phil Rizzuto; Bill White
1986	WABC	Spencer Ross; Bobby Murcer; Phil Rizzuto; Bill White
1987	WABC	Hank Greenwald; Tommy Hutton
1988	WABC	Hank Greenwald; Tommy Hutton
1989	WABC	John Sterling; Jay Johnstone
1990	WABC	John Sterling; Jay Johnstone
1991	WABC	John Sterling; Joe Angel
1992	WABC	John Sterling; Michael Kay
1993	WABC	John Sterling; Michael Kay
1994	WABC	John Sterling; Michael Kay
1995	WABC	John Sterling; Michael Kay
1996	WABC	John Sterling; Michael Kay
1997	WABC	John Sterling; Michael Kay
1998	WABC	John Sterling; Michael Kay
1999	WABC	John Sterling; Michael Kay
2000	WABC	John Sterling; Michael Kay
2001	WABC	John Sterling; Michael Kay
2002	WCBS	John Sterling; Charley Steiner
2003	WCBS	John Sterling; Charley Steiner
2004	WCBS	John Sterling; Charley Steiner
2005	WCBS	John Sterling; Suzyn Waldman
2006	WCBS	John Sterling; Suzyn Waldman
2007	WCBS	John Sterling; Suzyn Waldman
2008	WCBS	John Sterling; Suzyn Waldman
2009	WCBS	John Sterling; Suzyn Waldman
2010	WCBS	John Sterling; Suzyn Waldman
2011	WCBS	John Sterling; Suzyn Waldman
2012	WCBS	John Sterling; Suzyn Waldman
2013	WCBS	John Sterling; Suzyn Waldman
2014	WFAN; WFAN-FM	John Sterling; Suzyn Waldman
2015	WFAN; WFAN-FM	John Sterling; Suzyn Waldman
2016	WFAN; WFAN-FM	John Sterling; Suzyn Waldman
2017	WFAN; WFAN-FM	John Sterling; Suzyn Waldman
2018	WFAN; WFAN-FM	John Sterling; Suzyn Waldman
2019	WFAN; WFAN-FM	John Sterling; Ryan Ruocco; Suzyn Waldman
2020	WFAN; WFAN-FM	John Sterling; Suzyn Waldman
2021	WFAN; WFAN-FM	John Sterling; Suzyn Waldman
2022	WFAN; WFAN-FM	John Sterling; Suzyn Waldman
2023	WFAN; WFAN-FM	John Sterling; Ryan Ruocco; Justin Shackil; Brendan Burke; Rickie Ricardo; Suzyn Waldman
2024	WFAN; WFAN-FM	John Sterling; Justin Shackil; Suzyn Waldman; Jeff Nelson
2025	WFAN; WFAN-FM	Dave Sims; Emmanuel Berbari; Suzyn Waldman

=== Radio play-by-play and color commentators ===
- Garnett Marks, 1939
- Arch McDonald β, 1939
- Mel Allen β, 1939–1940, 1942, 1946–1964
- J.C. Flippen, 1940
- Connie Desmond, 1942
- Don Dunphy, 1944
- Bill Slater, 1944–1945
- Al Helfer β, 1945
- Russ Hodges β, 1946–1948
- Curt Gowdy β, 1949–1950
- Art Gleeson, 1951–1952
- Bill Crowley, 1951–1952
- Joe E. Brown, 1953
- Jim Woods, 1953–1956
- Red Barber β, 1954–1966
- Phil Rizzuto, 1957–1986
- Jerry Coleman β, 1963–1969
- Joe Garagiola β, 1965–1967
- Frank Messer, 1968–1985
- Bob Gamere, 1970
- Bill White, 1971–1986
- Dom Valentino, 1975
- Fran Healy, 1978–1981
- John Gordon, 1982–1985 (Pre and postgame only, 1986)
- Bobby Murcer, 1986
- Spencer Ross, 1986
- Hank Greenwald, 1987–1988
- Tommy Hutton, 1987–1988
- John Sterling, 1989–2024
- Jay Johnstone, 1989–1990
- Joe Angel, 1991
- Michael Kay, 1992–2001
- Charley Steiner, 2002–2004
- Suzyn Waldman, 2005–present
- Beto Villa, 1997–2013 en Español
- Francisco Rivera, 2005–present en Español
- Felix DeJesus, 2006–present en Español
- Rickie Ricardo, 2014–present en Español, 2020–present (acting, relief PBP presenter for Stering)
- Ryan Ruocco, 2019 (acting, relief PBP presenter for Sterling)
- Chris Carrino, 2019 (acting, relief PBP presenter for Sterling)

β - indicates Ford C. Frick Award winner

== Broadcast outlets ==
=== Radio stations ===
- WABC/WCBS: 1939–1940, 1961–1966, 2002–2013
- WOR: 1941-1942
- WINS: 1944–1957, 1978–1980
- WMGM/WHN: 1958–1960, 1967–1970
- WMCA: 1971–1977
- WABC: 1981–2001
- WFAN–WFAN-FM: 2014–present
- WADO: 2010–present (Spanish)

=== Television stations ===
The Yankees' New York City flagship station has been:

- WABD/WNYW: 1947–1951; 1999–2001
- WCBS-TV: 2002–2004
- WWOR-TV: 2005–2014
- WPIX: 1951–1998; 2015–2021

Outside of New York City, over-the-air television broadcasts can often be seen on:

- WCTX "My TV 9" New Haven/Hartford
- WCWN "The CW 15" Albany (2013–)
- WNYO-TV "My TV" Buffalo
- WHAM-TV, WHAM-DT2 (The CW Rochester) Rochester
- WSTM-DT2 "CW6", WSTM-TV "NBC 3" Syracuse
- WQMY Williamsport/Scranton/Wilkes Barre
- WPNY-LD Utica

=== Cable television ===
- SportsChannel New York 1979–1988
- MSG Network 1989–2001
- YES Network 2002–current

=== Streaming television ===
- Amazon Prime Video 2020–present

=== Radio Network ===
WFAN and WFAN-FM are flagships for a 52 station radio network spanning 14 states.

== See also ==
- List of current Major League Baseball announcers
