= 1970 New York Yankees season =

Season for the Major League Baseball team the New York Yankees

1970 New York Yankees
- League: American League
- Division: East
- Ballpark: Yankee Stadium
- City: New York City
- Record: 93-69 (.574)
- Owners: CBS
- General managers: Lee MacPhail
- Managers: Ralph Houk
- Television: WPIX (Phil Rizzuto, Frank Messer, Bob Gamere, Whitey Ford)
- Radio: WHN (Frank Messer, Phil Rizzuto, Bob Gamere)

The 1970 New York Yankees season was the 68th season for the franchise. The team finished in second place in the American League East with a record of 93–69, 15 games behind the Baltimore Orioles. The 93 wins were the most for the Yankees since 1964. New York was managed by Ralph Houk. The Yankees played their home games at Yankee Stadium.

== Offseason ==
- December 1, 1969: Tom Shopay was drafted from the Yankees by the Baltimore Orioles in the 1969 rule 5 draft.
- December 4, 1969: Joe Pepitone was traded by the Yankees to the Houston Astros for Curt Blefary.
- December 5, 1969: Al Downing and Frank Fernández were traded by the Yankees to the Oakland Athletics for Danny Cater and Ossie Chavarria.
- December 18, 1969: Mickey Scott and cash were traded by the Yankees to the Chicago White Sox for Pete Ward.

== Regular season ==
The Yankees went from a record of 80 wins and 81 losses in 1969 to a record of 93 wins and 69 losses.

=== Season standings ===
AL East
Team	W	L	Pct.	GB	Home	Road
Baltimore Orioles	108	54	.667	—	59‍–‍22	49‍–‍32
New York Yankees	93	69	.574	15	53‍–‍28	40‍–‍41
Boston Red Sox	87	75	.537	21	52‍–‍29	35‍–‍46
Detroit Tigers	79	83	.488	29	42‍–‍39	37‍–‍44
Cleveland Indians	76	86	.469	32	43‍–‍38	33‍–‍48
Washington Senators	70	92	.432	38	40‍–‍41	30‍–‍51

=== Record vs. opponents ===
1970 American League record Sources:
Team	BAL	BOS	CAL	CWS	CLE	DET	KC	MIL	MIN	NYY	OAK	WAS
Baltimore	—	13–5	7–5	9–3	14–4	11–7	12–0	7–5	5–7	11–7	7–5	12–6
Boston	5–13	—	5–7	8–4	12–6	9–9	7–5	5–7	7–5	10–8	7–5	12–6
California	5–7	7–5	—	12–6	6–6	6–6	10–8	12–6	8–10	5–7	8–10	7–5
Chicago	3–9	4–8	6–12	—	6–6	6–6	7–11	7–11	6–12	5–7	2–16	4–8
Cleveland	4–14	6–12	6–6	6–6	—	7–11	8–4	7–5	6–6	8–10	7–5	11–7
Detroit	7–11	9–9	6–6	6–6	11–7	—	6–6	8–4	4–8	7–11	6–6	9–9
Kansas City	0–12	5–7	8–10	11–7	4–8	6–6	—	12–6	5–13	1–11	7–11	6–6
Milwaukee	5–7	7–5	6–12	11–7	5–7	4–8	6–12	—	5–13	3–9–1	8–10	5–7
Minnesota	7–5	5–7	10–8	12–6	6–6	8–4	13–5	13–5	—	5–7	13–5	6–6
New York	7–11	8–10	7–5	7–5	10–8	11–7	11–1	9–3–1	7–5	—	6–6	10–8
Oakland	5–7	5–7	10–8	16–2	5–7	6–6	11–7	10–8	5–13	6–6	—	10–2
Washington	6–12	6–12	5–7	8–4	7–11	9–9	6–6	7–5	6–6	8–10	2–10	—

=== Opening Day lineup ===
- Horace Clarke 2B
- Thurman Munson C
- Roy White LF
- John Ellis 1B
- Danny Cater 3B
- Bobby Murcer CF
- Curt Blefary RF
- Gene Michael SS
- Mel Stottlemyre P

=== Notable transactions ===
- September 22, 1970: Bobby Cox was released by the Yankees.

=== Roster ===
1970 New York Yankees
Roster
Pitchers: 22 Jack Aker; 45 Stan Bahnsen; 50 Bill Burbach; 49 Loyd Colson; 56 John Cumberland; 43 Rob Gardner; 39 Steve Hamilton; 39 Gary Jones; 18 Mike Kekich; 24 Ron Klimkowski; 38,42 Steve Kline; 29 Mike McCormick; 40 Lindy McDaniel; 19 Fritz Peterson; 30 Mel Stottlemyre; 52 Joe Verbanic; 54 Gary Waslewski	Catchers: 41 Jake Gibbs; 15 Thurman Munson; Infielders: 26 Frank Baker; 10 Danny Cater; 20 Horace Clarke; 23 John Ellis; 28 Ron Hansen; 2 Jerry Kenney; 17 Gene Michael; 21 Frank Tepedino; 25 Pete Ward	Outfielders: 13 Curt Blefary; 27 Jim Lyttle; 46 Bobby Mitchell; 1 Bobby Murcer; 6 Roy White; 9 Ron Woods	Manager: 35 Ralph Houk; Coaches: 44 Jim Hegan; 32 Elston Howard; 34 Dick Howser; 7 Mickey Mantle; 31 Jim Turner

== Player stats ==
= Indicates team leader

=== Batting ===
==== Starters by position ====
Note: Pos = Position; G = Games played; AB = At bats; R = Runs scored; H = Hits; Avg. = Batting average; HR = Home runs; RBI = Runs batted in; SB = Stolen bases

Pos	Player	G	AB	R	H	Avg.	HR	RBI	SB
C	Thurman Munson	132	453	59	137	.302	6	53	5
1B	Danny Cater	155	582	64	175	.301	6	76	4
2B	Horace Clarke	158	686	81	172	.251	4	46	23
3B	Jerry Kenney	140	404	46	78	.193	4	35	20
SS	Gene Michael	134	435	42	93	.214	2	38	3
LF	Roy White	162	609	109	180	.296	22	94	24
CF	Bobby Murcer	159	581	95	146	.251	23	78	15
RF	Curt Blefary	99	269	34	57	.212	9	37	1

==== Other batters ====
Note: G = Games played; AB = At bats; R = Runs scored; H = Hits; Avg. = Batting average; HR = Home runs; RBI = Runs batted in; SB = Stolen bases

Player	G	AB	R	H	Avg.	HR	RBI	SB
John Ellis	78	226	24	56	.248	7	29	0
Ron Woods	95	225	30	51	.227	8	27	4
Jake Gibbs	49	153	23	46	.301	8	26	2
Jim Lyttle	87	126	20	39	.310	3	14	3
Frank Baker	35	117	6	27	.231	0	11	1
Ron Hansen	59	91	13	27	.297	4	14	0
Pete Ward	66	77	5	20	.260	1	18	0
Bobby Mitchell	10	22	1	5	.227	0	4	0
Frank Tepedino	16	19	2	6	.316	0	2	0

=== Pitching ===
==== Starting pitchers ====
Note: G = Games pitched; IP = Innings pitched; W = Wins; L = Losses; ERA = Earned run average; SO = Strikeouts

Player	G	IP	W	L	ERA	SO
Mel Stottlemyre	37	271.0	15	13	3.09	126
Fritz Peterson	39	260.1	20	11	2.90	127
Stan Bahnsen	36	232.2	14	11	3.33	116
Bill Burbach	4	16.2	0	2	10.26	10
Rob Gardner	1	7.1	1	0	4.91	6

==== Other pitchers ====
Note: G = Games pitched; IP = Innings pitched; W = Wins; L = Losses; ERA = Earned run average; SO = Strikeouts

Player	G	IP	W	L	ERA	SO
Mike Kekich	26	98.2	6	3	4.83	63
John Cumberland	15	64.0	3	4	3.94	38
Gary Waslewski	26	55.0	2	2	3.11	27
Mike McCormick	9	20.2	2	0	6.10	12

==== Relief pitchers ====
Note: G = Games pitched; W = Wins; L = Losses; SV = Saves; ERA = Earned run average; SO = Strikeouts

Player	G	W	L	SV	ERA	SO
Lindy McDaniel	62	9	5	29	2.01	81
Ron Klimkowski	45	6	7	1	2.65	40
Jack Aker	41	4	2	16	2.06	36
Steve Hamilton	35	4	3	3	2.78	33
Joe Verbanic	7	1	0	0	4.60	8
Gary Jones	2	0	0	0	0.00	2
Loyd Colson	1	0	0	0	4.50	3

== Awards and honors ==
- Ralph Houk, Associated Press AL Manager of the Year
- Thurman Munson, AL Rookie of the Year
- 1970 MLB All-Star Game
  - Fritz Peterson, reserve
  - Mel Stottlemyre, reserve
  - Roy White, reserve

== Farm system ==
Level	Team	League	Manager
AAA	Syracuse Chiefs	International League	Frank Verdi
AA	Manchester Yankees	Eastern League	Gene Hassell
A	Kinston Eagles	Carolina League	Alex Cosmidis
A	Fort Lauderdale Yankees	Florida State League	Lamar North
A-Short Season	Oneonta Yankees	New York–Penn League	George Case
Rookie	Johnson City Yankees	Appalachian League	Jerry Walker

LEAGUE CHAMPIONS: Syracuse
