= 1981 New York Yankees season =

Season for the Major League Baseball team the New York Yankees

1981 New York Yankees
- American League champions American League East champions
- League: American League
- Division: East
- Ballpark: Yankee Stadium
- City: New York City
- Record: 1st half: 34–22 (.607); 2nd half: 25–26 (.490); Overall: 59–48 (.551)
- Divisional place: 1st half: 1st; 2nd half: 5th (tied; 5 GB)
- Owners: George Steinbrenner
- General managers: Gene Michael
- Managers: Gene Michael, Bob Lemon
- Television: WPIX; SportsChannel NY (Phil Rizzuto, Frank Messer, Bill White)
- Radio: WABC (AM) (Frank Messer, Phil Rizzuto, Bill White, Fran Healy)

The 1981 New York Yankees season was the franchise's 79th season. Games were suspended for 50 days due to the 1981 Major League Baseball strike, causing a split season. The Yankees competed as members of the American League East, finishing first in the first half of the season, and tying for fifth in the second half of the season; overall, they won 59 games while losing 48. The team advanced to the postseason due to their first-half first-place finish, where they defeated the Milwaukee Brewers in the American League Division Series and the Oakland Athletics in the American League Championship Series, capturing the Yankees' only pennant of the 1980s. The Yankees then lost the World Series in six games to the Los Angeles Dodgers. The Yankees played their home games at Yankee Stadium and were managed by Gene Michael until September 5, and by Bob Lemon thereafter.

== Offseason ==
- November 18, 1980: Brad Gulden was traded by the New York Yankees with $150,000 to the Seattle Mariners for a player to be named later and Larry Milbourne. The Seattle Mariners sent back Brad Gulden (May 18, 1981) to the New York Yankees to complete the trade. In effect, Brad Gulden was traded for himself.
- December 8, 1980: Brian Doyle was drafted from the Yankees by the Oakland Athletics in the 1980 rule 5 draft.
- December 15, 1980: Dave Winfield was signed as a free agent with the New York Yankees.
- February 16, 1981: Rafael Santana was traded by the Yankees to the St. Louis Cardinals for a player to be named later. The Cardinals completed the deal by sending George Frazier to the Yankees on June 7.
- March 31, 1981: Chris Welsh, Ruppert Jones, Joe Lefebvre, and Tim Lollar were traded by the Yankees to the San Diego Padres for Jerry Mumphrey and John Pacella.

== Regular season ==
The team finished in first place in the American League East for the first half of the season with a 34–22 record but finished fifth in the second half with a 25–26 record, for an overall record of 59–48. The season was suspended for 50 days due to the infamous 1981 players strike and the league chose as its playoff teams, the division winners from the first and second halves of the season, respectively.

=== Notable transactions ===
- April 6, 1981: Johnny Oates was signed as a free agent by the Yankees.
- May 20, 1981: Jim Spencer and Tom Underwood were traded by the Yankees to the Oakland Athletics for Dave Revering, Mike Patterson, and Chuck Dougherty (minors).
- June 12, 1981: Doug Bird, a player to be named later, and $400,000 were traded by the Yankees to the Chicago Cubs for Rick Reuschel. The Yankees completed the deal by sending Mike Griffin to the Cubs on August 5.
- August 19, 1981: Pat Tabler was traded by the Yankees to the Chicago Cubs for players to be named later. The Cubs completed the deal by sending Bill Caudill to the Yankees on April 1, 1982, and Jay Howell to the Yankees on August 2.

==== Draft picks ====
- June 8, 1981: 1981 Major League Baseball draft
  - John Elway was drafted by the Yankees in the 2nd round.
  - Phil Lombardi was drafted by the Yankees in the 3rd round.
  - Eric Plunk was drafted by the Yankees in the 4th round. Player signed June 15, 1981.
  - Fred McGriff was drafted by the Yankees in the 9th round. McGriff signed on June 11, 1981.

=== Season standings ===
AL East
Team	W	L	Pct.	GB	Home	Road
Milwaukee Brewers	62	47	.569	—	28‍–‍21	34‍–‍26
Baltimore Orioles	59	46	.562	1	33‍–‍22	26‍–‍24
New York Yankees	59	48	.551	2	32‍–‍19	27‍–‍29
Detroit Tigers	60	49	.550	2	32‍–‍23	28‍–‍26
Boston Red Sox	59	49	.546	2½	30‍–‍23	29‍–‍26
Cleveland Indians	52	51	.505	7	25‍–‍29	27‍–‍22
Toronto Blue Jays	37	69	.349	23½	17‍–‍36	20‍–‍33

AL East First Half Standings	W	L	Pct.	GB
New York Yankees	34	22	.607	—
Baltimore Orioles	31	23	.574	2
Milwaukee Brewers	31	25	.554	3
Detroit Tigers	31	26	.544	3 1/2
Boston Red Sox	30	26	.536	4
Cleveland Indians	26	24	.520	5
Toronto Blue Jays	16	42	.276	19

AL East Second Half Standings	W	L	Pct.	GB
Milwaukee Brewers	31	22	.585	—
Boston Red Sox	29	23	.558	1 1/2
Detroit Tigers	29	23	.558	1 1/2
Baltimore Orioles	28	23	.549	2
Cleveland Indians	26	27	.491	5
New York Yankees	25	26	.490	5
Toronto Blue Jays	21	27	.438	7 1/2

=== Record vs. opponents ===
1981 American League record Sources:
Team	BAL	BOS	CAL	CWS	CLE	DET	KC	MIL	MIN	NYY	OAK	SEA	TEX	TOR
Baltimore	—	2–2	6–6	3–6	4–2	6–7	5–3	2–4	6–0	7–6	7–5	4–2	2–1	5–2
Boston	2–2	—	2–4	5–4	7–6	6–1	3–3	6–7	2–5	3–3	7–5	9–3	3–6	4–0
California	6–6	4–2	—	6–7	7–5	3–3	0–6	4–3	3–3	2–2	2–8	6–4	2–4	6–6
Chicago	6–3	4–5	7–6	—	2–5	3–3	2–0	4–1	2–4	5–7	7–6	3–3	2–4	7–5
Cleveland	2–4	6–7	5–7	5–2	—	1–5	4–4	3–6	2–1	7–5	3–2	8–4	2–2	4–2
Detroit	7–6	1–6	3–3	3–3	5–1	—	3–2	5–8	9–3	3–7	1–2	5–1	9–3	6–4
Kansas City	3–5	3–3	6–0	0–2	4–4	2–3	—	4–5	9–4	2–10	3–3	6–7	3–4	5–3
Milwaukee	4–2	7–6	3–4	1–4	6–3	8–5	5–4	—	9–3	3–3	4–2	2–2	4–5	6–4
Minnesota	0–6	5–2	3–3	4–2	1–2	3–9	4–9	3–9	—	3–3	2–8	3–6–1	5–8	5–1
New York	6–7	3–3	2–2	7–5	5–7	7–3	10–2	3–3	3–3	—	4–3	2–3	5–4	2–3
Oakland	5–7	5–7	8–2	6–7	2–3	2–1	3–3	2–4	8–2	3–4	—	6–1	4–2	10–2
Seattle	2–4	3–9	4–6	3–3	4–8	1–5	7–6	2–2	6–3–1	3–2	1–6	—	5–8	3–3
Texas	1–2	6–3	4–2	4–2	2–2	3–9	4–3	5–4	8–5	4–5	2–4	8–5	—	6–2
Toronto	2–5	0–4	6–6	5–7	2–4	4–6	3–5	4–6	1–5	3–2	2–10	3–3	2–6	—

=== Roster ===
1981 New York Yankees
Roster
Pitchers: 43 Doug Bird; 35,56 Bill Castro; 39 Ron Davis; 43 George Frazier; 54 Goose Gossage; 52 Mike Griffin; 49 Ron Guidry; 25 Tommy John; 34 Dave LaRoche; 45 Rudy May; 58 Andy McGaffigan; 46,55 Gene Nelson; 36 Rick Reuschel; 19 Dave Righetti; 38 Tom Underwood; 58 Dave Wehrmeister	Catchers: 10 Rick Cerone; 23 Barry Foote; 26 Johnny Oates; Infielders: 57 Tucker Ashford; 66 Steve Balboni; 20 Bucky Dent; 18 Larry Milbourne; 9 Graig Nettles; 30 Willie Randolph; 12 Dave Revering; 55 Andre Robertson; 27 Aurelio Rodríguez; 12 Jim Spencer; 28 Bob Watson; 24 Dennis Werth	Outfielders: 13 Bobby Brown; 17 Oscar Gamble; 44 Reggie Jackson; 22 Jerry Mumphrey; 56 Mike Patterson; 14 Lou Piniella; 31 Dave Winfield; Other batters: 2 Bobby Murcer	Manager: 21 Bob Lemon; 11 Gene Michael; Coaches: 48 Joe Altobelli; 8 Yogi Berra; 33 Mike Ferraro; -- Clyde King; 40 Charley Lau; 41 Jeff Torborg; -- Jerry Walker; 42 Stan Williams

== Game log ==
=== Regular season ===
==== First half ====
1981 regular season game log: 34–22 (Home: 19–7; Away: 15–15)
April: 11–6 (Home: 6–3; Away: 5–3)

#	Date	Time (ET)	Opponent	Score	Win	Loss	Save	Time of Game	Attendance	Record	Box/ Streak	GB

May: 14–14 (Home: 7–4; Away: 7–10)

#	Date	Time (ET)	Opponent	Score	Win	Loss	Save	Time of Game	Attendance	Record	Box/ Streak	GB

June: 9–2 (Home: 6–0; Away: 3–2)

#	Date	Time (ET)	Opponent	Score	Win	Loss	Save	Time of Game	Attendance	Record	Box/ Streak	GB

Legend: = Win = Loss = Postponement
Bold = Yankees team member

==== Second half ====
1981 regular season game log: 25–26 (Home: 13–12; Away: 12–14)
August: 11–10 (Home: 6–6; Away: 5–4)

#	Date	Time (ET)	Opponent	Score	Win	Loss	Save	Time of Game	Attendance	Record	Box/ Streak	GB
–	August 9		**1981 Major League Baseball All-Star Game** at Cleveland Stadium in Cleveland									

September: 13–14 (Home: 7–6; Away: 6–8)

#	Date	Time (ET)	Opponent	Score	Win	Loss	Save	Time of Game	Attendance	Record	Box/ Streak	GB

October: 1–2 (Home: 0–0; Away: 1–2)

#	Date	Time (ET)	Opponent	Score	Win	Loss	Save	Time of Game	Attendance	Record	Box/ Streak	GB

Legend: = Win = Loss = Postponement
Bold = Yankees team member

=== Postseason Game log ===
1981 Postseason game log: 8–6 (Home: 5–3; Away: 3–3)
AL Division Series: vs. Milwaukee Brewers 3–2 (Home: 1–2; Away: 2–0)

#	Date	Time (ET)	Opponent	Score	Win	Loss	Save	Time of Game	Attendance	Record	Box/ Streak

AL Championship Series: vs. Oakland Athletics 3–0 (Home: 2–0; Away: 1–0)

#	Date	Time (ET)	Opponent	Score	Win	Loss	Save	Time of Game	Attendance	Record	Box/ Streak

World Series: vs. Los Angeles Dodgers 2–4 (Home: 2–1; Away: 1–3)

#	Date	Time (ET)	Opponent	Score	Win	Loss	Save	Time of Game	Attendance	Record	Box/ Streak

Legend: = Win = Loss = Postponement
Bold = Yankees team member

== Player stats ==
= Indicates team leader

=== Batting ===
==== Starters by position ====
Note: Pos = Position; G = Games played; AB = At bats; H = Hits; Avg. = Batting average; HR = Home runs; RBI = Runs batted in

Pos	Player	G	AB	R	H	Avg.	HR	RBI	SB
C	Rick Cerone	71	234	23	57	.244	2	21	0
1B	Bob Watson	59	156	15	33	.212	6	12	0
2B	Willie Randolph	93	357	59	83	.232	2	24	14
SS	Bucky Dent	73	227	20	54	.238	7	27	0
3B	Graig Nettles	103	349	46	85	.244	15	46	0
LF	Dave Winfield	105	388	52	114	.294	13	68	11
CF	Jerry Mumphrey	80	319	44	98	.307	6	32	14
RF	Reggie Jackson	94	334	33	79	.237	15	54	0
DH	Bobby Murcer	50	117	14	31	.265	6	24	0

==== Other batters ====
Note: G = Games played; AB = At bats; H = Hits; Avg. = Batting average; HR = Home runs; RBI = Runs batted in

Player	G	AB	H	Avg.	HR	RBI
Oscar Gamble	80	189	45	.238	10	27
Larry Milbourne	61	163	51	.313	1	12
Lou Piniella	60	159	44	.277	5	18
Barry Foote	40	125	26	.208	6	10
Dave Revering	45	119	28	.235	2	7
Jim Spencer	25	63	9	.143	2	4
Bobby Brown	31	62	14	.226	0	6
Dennis Werth	34	55	6	.109	0	1
Aurelio Rodriguez	27	52	18	.346	2	8
Johnny Oates	10	26	5	.192	0	0
Andre Robertson	10	19	5	.263	0	0
Mike Patterson	4	9	2	.222	0	0
Steve Balboni	4	7	2	.286	0	2
Tucker Ashford	3	0	0	----	0	0

=== Pitching ===
= Indicates league leader

==== Starting pitchers ====
Note: G = Games pitched; IP = Innings pitched; W = Wins; L = Losses; ERA = Earned run average; SO = Strikeouts

Player	G	IP	W	L	ERA	SO
Rudy May	27	147.2	6	11	4.14	79
Tommy John	20	140.1	9	8	2.63	50
Ron Guidry	23	127.0	11	5	2.76	104
Dave Righetti	15	105.1	8	4	2.05	89
Rick Reuschel	12	70.2	4	4	2.67	22
Gene Nelson	8	39.1	3	1	4.81	16

==== Other pitchers ====
Note: G = Games pitched; IP = Innings pitched; W = Wins; L = Losses; ERA = Earned run average; SO = Strikeouts

Player	G	IP	W	L	ERA	SO
Doug Bird	17	53.1	5	1	2.70	28
Tom Underwood	9	32.2	1	4	4.41	29

==== Relief pitchers ====
Note: G = Games pitched; W = Wins; L = Losses; SV = Saves; ERA = Earned run average; SO = Strikeouts

Player	G	W	L	SV	ERA	SO
Rich Gossage	32	3	2	20	0.77	48
Ron Davis	43	4	5	6	2.71	83
Dave LaRoche	26	4	1	0	2.49	24
George Frazier	16	0	1	3	1.63	17
Bill Castro	11	1	1	0	3.79	4
Dave Wehrmeister	5	0	0	0	5.14	7
Andy McGaffigan	2	0	0	0	2.57	2
Mike Griffin	2	0	0	0	2.08	4

== Postseason ==
=== ALDS ===
New York wins series, 3–2.

Game	Score	Date
1	New York 5, Milwaukee 3	October 7
2	New York 3, Milwaukee 0	October 8
3	Milwaukee 5, New York 3	October 9
4	Milwaukee 2, New York 1	October 10
5	New York 7, Milwaukee 3	October 11

=== ALCS ===
New York Yankees win the Series over the Oakland Athletics, 3–0

Game	Score	Date	Location	Attendance
1	Oakland – 1, New York – 3	October 13	Yankee Stadium	55,740
2	Oakland – 3, New York – 13	October 14	Yankee Stadium	48,497
3	New York – 4, Oakland – 0	October 15	Oakland Coliseum	47,302

=== World Series ===
NL Los Angeles Dodgers (4) vs. AL New York Yankees (2)
Game	Score	Date	Location	Attendance	Time of Game
1	Dodgers – 3, Yankees – 5	October 20	Yankee Stadium (New York)	56,470	2:32
2	Dodgers – 0, Yankees – 3	October 21	Yankee Stadium (New York)	56,505	2:29
3	Yankees – 4, Dodgers – 5	October 23	Dodger Stadium (Los Angeles)	56,236	3:04
4	Yankees – 7, Dodgers – 8	October 24	Dodger Stadium (Los Angeles)	56,242	3:32
5	Yankees – 1, Dodgers – 2	October 25	Dodger Stadium (Los Angeles)	56,115	2:19
6	Dodgers – 9, Yankees – 2	October 28	Yankee Stadium (New York)	56,513	3:09

== Awards and honors ==
- Tommy John, Lou Gehrig Memorial Award
- Dave Righetti was honored as the AL Rookie of the Year.
- Graig Nettles, Most Valuable Player in the AL Championship Series.

All-Star Game

- Willie Randolph
- Bucky Dent
- Reggie Jackson
- Dave Winfield
- Ron Davis
- Rich Gossage

== Farm system ==
Level	Team	League	Manager
AAA	Columbus Clippers	International League	Frank Verdi
AA	Nashville Sounds	Southern League	Stump Merrill
A	Fort Lauderdale Yankees	Florida State League	Doug Holmquist
A	Greensboro Hornets	South Atlantic League	Bob Schaefer
A-Short Season	Oneonta Yankees	New York–Penn League	Art Mazmanian
Rookie	Paintsville Yankees	Appalachian League	Mike Easom
Rookie	GCL Yankees	Gulf Coast League	Carlos Tosca

LEAGUE CHAMPIONS: Columbus, Greensboro, Oneonta, Paintsville
