= Dom Valentino =

US TV sports presenter

Dominick Valentino (December 21, 1928 – April 17, 2012) was an American sportscaster.

== Personal life ==
Born in Brooklyn, New York, Valentino grew up in Hingham, Massachusetts. He earned a bachelor's degree in broadcast journalism from Boston University, and served in the United States Air Force during the Korean War.

== Professional career ==
Valentino began his broadcasting career in New England, calling Boston College football, basketball, and hockey as well as the Boston Bruins of the National Hockey League and the Boston Patriots of the American Football League. He went on to call games for the Cincinnati Royals, Kansas City-Omaha Kings, and New Orleans Jazz of the National Basketball Association in the 1960s and early '70s.

In 1975, Valentino worked with the New York Yankees radio team, alongside Phil Rizzuto, Frank Messer and Bill White. He also announced for the New York Nets basketball team and New York Islanders hockey team that year. He teamed with Red Rush and Ted Robinson on Oakland Athletics radio broadcasts on KDIA for one season in 1980. He also worked at the minor league baseball level, calling games for the New Orleans Pelicans and Las Vegas Stars.
