= Loyd Colson =

American baseball player (born 1947)

- Pitcher
- Born: November 4, 1947 (age 78); Wellington, Texas, U.S.
- Batted: Right Threw: Right

MLB debut
- September 25, 1970, for the New York Yankees

Last MLB appearance
- September 25, 1970, for the New York Yankees

MLB statistics
- Win–loss record: 0–0
- Earned run average: 4.50
- Strikeouts: 3
- Stats at Baseball Reference

Teams
- New York Yankees (1970)

Loyd Albert Colson (born November 4, 1947) is an American former Major League Baseball pitcher who batted and threw right-handed. Colson pitched the last two innings for the New York Yankees in one game, on September 25, 1970, against the Detroit Tigers at Yankee Stadium. In his only career appearance, he gave up three hits, one earned run and struck out three batters. He finished with a 0–0 record with a 4.50 earned run average.

Colton attended high school in Gould, Oklahoma, then attended Bacone College and was drafted by the Yankees in the 28th round of the 1967 amateur draft.
