= Rick Cerone =

American baseball player (born 1954)

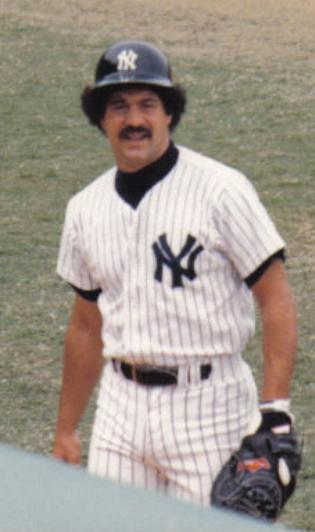
- Catcher
- Born: May 19, 1954 (age 72); Newark, New Jersey, U.S.
- Batted: Right Threw: Right

MLB debut
- August 17, 1975, for the Cleveland Indians

Last MLB appearance
- July 10, 1992, for the Montreal Expos

MLB statistics
- Batting average: .245
- Home runs: 59
- Runs batted in: 436
- Stats at Baseball Reference

Teams
- Cleveland Indians (1975–1976); Toronto Blue Jays (1977–1979); New York Yankees (1980–1984); Atlanta Braves (1985); Milwaukee Brewers (1986); New York Yankees (1987); Boston Red Sox (1988–1989); New York Yankees (1990); New York Mets (1991); Montreal Expos (1992)
Medals
Men's baseball
Representing United States
Baseball World Cup
Gold medal – first place	1974 St. Petersburg	Team

Richard Aldo Cerone (born May 19, 1954) is an American former professional baseball player, television sports color commentator and minor league baseball team owner. He played in Major League Baseball as a catcher from 1975 to 1992 with the Cleveland Indians, Toronto Blue Jays, New York Yankees, Atlanta Braves, Milwaukee Brewers, Boston Red Sox, New York Mets, and Montreal Expos.

== Amateur career ==
Cerone played high school baseball and football at Essex Catholic High School in Newark, New Jersey.

Cerone then attended Seton Hall University, where he played college baseball for the Seton Hall Pirates under head coach Mike Sheppard.

== Major league career ==
=== 1970s ===
==== Cleveland Indians (1975-76) ====
Cerone was drafted by the Cleveland Indians with the seventh overall pick in the first round of the 1975 MLB draft. He made his MLB debut on August 17, 1975, pinch hitting for first baseman Boog Powell in the top of the ninth inning in a 14–5 win over the Minnesota Twins, as he lined out. Cerone then replaced catcher Alan Ashby in the bottom of the ninth. On August 22, Cerone collected his first career hit, a single off Paul Splittorff of the Kansas City Royals. Overall, he finished the season playing in seven games with the Indians, batting .250.

Cerone saw little action again with the Indians in 1976, hitting .125 with an RBI in seven games with the club. On December 6, the Indians traded Cerone and John Lowenstein to the Toronto Blue Jays for Rico Carty.

==== Toronto Blue Jays (1977-79) ====
Cerone joined the Toronto Blue Jays for their expansion season in 1977, and was the starting catcher for their first game on April 7, in which he had two hits in their 9-5 victory over the Chicago White Sox. On August 17, Cerone hit his first career home run off Nelson Briles of the Texas Rangers. Overall, Cerone played in 31 games with Toronto, hitting .200 with a home run and ten RBI.

He saw more playing time with the Blue Jays in 1978, playing in 88 games, hitting .223 with three home runs and 23 RBI, as he split his playing time with Alan Ashby. The Blue Jays traded Ashby after the season, and named Cerone as their primary catcher for the 1979 season.

Cerone appeared in 136 games with Toronto in the 1979 season, hitting .239 with seven home runs. His 61 RBI represented the fourth highest total on the club. After the season, the Blue Jays and the New York Yankees completed a trade which sent Cerone, Tom Underwood and Ted Wilborn to the Yankees for Damaso Garcia, Chris Chambliss and Paul Mirabella.

=== 1980s ===
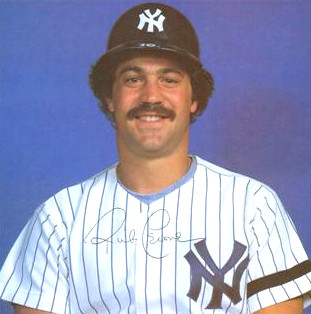
Cerone in 1981

==== New York Yankees (1980-84) ====
Cerone joined the New York Yankees for the 1980 season, following the death of catcher Thurman Munson the year before. In his first season with the Yankees, Cerone batted .277 with 14 home runs and 85 RBI in 147 games, and finished seventh in American League MVP voting, as he helped New York win the American League East division and qualify for the playoffs. Defensively, Cerone led the American League as he threw out 57 attempted stolen base attempts, which was a league best 51.8%. In his first playoffs, Cerone hit .333 with a home run and two RBI, however, the Yankees were swept by the Kansas City Royals in three games.

Cerone's production dipped in the 1981 season, as he hit .244 with two home runs and 21 RBI in 71 games. He told the Associated Press in October he had been getting threatening telegrams and phone calls for over a month, forcing him to change his phone number. However, the Yankees reached the post-season once again. After a tough loss in Game 3 of the American League Divisional Series (ALDS) against the Milwaukee Brewers, Yankee owner George Steinbrenner accused the team of showing him up and not playing well. Cerone swore at Steinbrenner, who responded, "You're gone next year. Nobody talks to me that way." Cerone left the room, returned, and shouted, "What do you know about it? You never played this game!" Steinbrenner's only response was a glare. In the playoffs, Cerone hit .333 with a home run and five RBI in the Yankees victory over the Brewers in the ALDS. In the American League Championship Series against the Oakland Athletics, Cerone struggled with a .100 batting average, however, the Yankees won the series and reached the 1981 World Series. In the World Series against the Los Angeles Dodgers, Cerone hit .190 with a home run and three RBI, as the Yankees lost to Los Angeles in six games.

Despite Steinbrenner's threat, Cerone remained with the Yankees in 1982. He split his playing time with Butch Wynegar, as he appeared in 89 games, hitting .227 with five home runs and 28 RBI, as the Yankees failed to make the playoffs. Cerone's production continued to drop in 1983, as he hit .220 with two homers and 22 RBI in 80 games. In 1984, Cerone became the backup catcher to Wynegar, appearing in only 38 games, batting .208 with two home runs and 13 RBI. On November 5, the Yankees traded Cerone to the Atlanta Braves for Brian Fisher.

==== Atlanta Braves (1985) ====
Cerone spent the 1985 season with the Atlanta Braves, splitting time with Bruce Benedict as the Braves catcher, as Cerone appeared in 96 games, hitting .216 with three homers and 25 RBI. On March 5, 1986, the Braves traded Cerone with two minor leaguers to the Milwaukee Brewers for Ted Simmons.

==== Milwaukee Brewers (1986) ====
Cerone played the 1986 season with the Milwaukee Brewers, as he and Charlie Moore shared the catching duties for the club. In 69 games, Cerone hit .259 with four home runs and 18 RBI. On November 12, Cerone was granted free agency.

==== New York Yankees (1987) ====
On February 13, 1987, Cerone rejoined the New York Yankees. Cerone played 113 games, his highest total since appearing in 147 games in the 1980 season, hitting .243 with four home runs and 23 RBI. In 1988, the Yankees designated Joel Skinner as their starting catcher and released Cerone on April 4, before the season, in favor of Don Slaught, who was expected to provide more offense as a backup.

==== Boston Red Sox (1988-89) ====
Not initially getting much interest from teams, Cerone was considering other jobs after his release by the Yankees, even interviewing with WABC for an advertising sales position. However, he signed with the Boston Red Sox on April 15, 1988, and in 84 games with the Red Sox, Cerone had a .269 batting average with three homers and 27 RBI, as he and Rich Gedman shared the catching duties. The Red Sox won the American League East division. Cerone, however, did not appear in any playoff games.

He returned to the Red Sox for the 1989 season, as Cerone hit .243 with four home runs and 48 RBI in 102 games with Boston, however, the Red Sox fell short in making the post-season. On December 19, Boston released Cerone.

=== 1990s ===
==== New York Yankees (1990) ====
On December 20, 1989, one day after being released by the Boston Red Sox, Cerone rejoined the Yankees for a third time, as he signed a two-year contract with the club as a free agent. Cerone backed up Yankees starting catcher Bob Geren, as he appeared in only 49 games, hitting .302 with two homers and 11 RBI in limited action. On January 13, 1991, the Yankees released Cerone.

==== New York Mets (1991) ====
On January 21, 1991, Cerone signed a contract with the New York Mets, where he split playing time with Charlie O'Brien. In 90 games with the Mets, Cerone hit .273 with two home runs and 16 RBI. On October 7, he was granted free agency.

==== Montreal Expos (1992) ====
On February 12, 1992, Cerone signed as a free agent with the Montreal Expos, hitting .270 with a home run and seven RBI in 33 games as backup to Gary Carter. With the emergence of Darrin Fletcher, however, the Expos released Cerone on July 16.

=== Career (1975-1992) ===
Cerone finished his career with a .245 batting average, 998 career hits, 59 HR and 436 RBI in 1329 games. In 17 career playoff games, Cerone hit .246 with three home runs and ten RBI.

== Post-playing career ==
Cerone served as a color analyst on Yankees telecasts on WPIX during the 1996 and 1997 seasons, and for Baltimore Orioles telecasts on HTS in 1998. During the 1996 postseason, he worked as a radio analyst on the broadcasts CBS Radio of the ALDS, teaming with Ernie Harwell. During the ALCS and World Series, he teamed with Gary Thorne on the television broadcasts of MLB International.

In 1998, Cerone founded the Newark Bears, a minor league ball club in the independent Atlantic League. He sold the team in 2003.

Cerone lived in Cresskill, New Jersey, in the 1990s. and later in Teaneck, New Jersey, Montclair, New Jersey, and Woodland Park, New Jersey. He has three daughters: Jessica, Carly and Nikki, and commutes between homes in Woodland Park, Long Branch, New Jersey, and West Palm Beach, Florida, to be with his daughters.

== "A Long Run Home" ==
In 1981, Cerone recorded "A Long Run Home," a song released as a 7" single on the Reel Dreams label. The song, written by Carl Henry and Bill Hudak and recorded in Newington, Connecticut, is sung from the point of view of a Newark baseball player visiting a New York Stadium during a snowstorm. The record sleeve notes that "Rick Cerone's royalties will be donated to the Italian earthquake Victims Fund." The single failed to chart in the US.
