= Dave Cohen (sportscaster) =

American sportscaster

David J. Cohen (born 1951), also known as "Coney Island Dave Cohen", is an actor and sportscaster.

== Education ==
He attended Stuyvesant High School and Syracuse University, graduating in 1972.

== Career ==
=== Actor ===
He has appeared in HBO's Eastbound and Down series; films like Glory Road; Trouble with the Curve; Ruffian; and Amy & Isabelle. He also appeared as a sportscaster in an episode of One Tree Hill.

=== TV Sportscaster ===
He was also a TV and Radio sportscaster, most notably with the New York Yankees on MSG Network and for three decades as an ESPN freelance play-by-play talent. Debuting in 1979 on ESPN he announced men's and women's college basketball; college football; lacrosse; soccer; boxing; wrestling; track and field; college baseball; softball and crew racing. He was the creator and original host of Mets Extra in 1986 and 87; an ABC Radio Network sports anchor; producer and announcer on Costas Coast-to-Coast as well as Jim McKay's Thoroughbred Connection. His TV anchoring includes WSYR and WIXT; WABC-TV and Fox Sports South in Atlanta where he also did Atlanta Braves hosting and play-by-play.

=== Radio ===
At WSB radio he was the Braves pre and post-game host as well as a sportstalk host. Dave Cohen was also a topical promo voice of CNN; an image voice for NASCAR; and an NBA TV play-by-play voice of the Washington Bullets. His voice has appeared on hundreds of commercials and infomercials.

== Awards ==
He won an Emmy Award in 1996 for his commentary on Dwight Gooden's no-hitter.

== Personal life ==
Cohen is married to Kathleen. He currently lives in Atlanta, Georgia.
