= Bobby Murcer =

American baseball player and broadcaster (1946–2008)

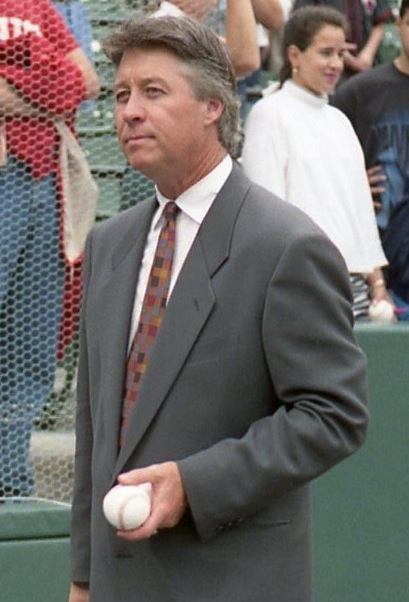
- Murcer at Camden Yards in 1993
- Outfielder
- Born: May 20, 1946; Oklahoma City, Oklahoma, U.S.
- Died: July 12, 2008 (aged 62); Oklahoma City, Oklahoma, U.S.
- Batted: Left Threw: Right

MLB debut
- September 8, 1965, for the New York Yankees

Last MLB appearance
- June 11, 1983, for the New York Yankees

MLB statistics
- Batting average: .277
- Home runs: 252
- Runs batted in: 1,043
- Stats at Baseball Reference

Teams
- New York Yankees (1965–1966, 1969–1974); San Francisco Giants (1975–1976); Chicago Cubs (1977–1979); New York Yankees (1979–1983)

Career highlights and awards
- 5× All-Star (1971–1975); Gold Glove Award (1972)

Bobby Ray Murcer (May 20, 1946 – July 12, 2008) was an American professional baseball outfielder who played 17 seasons in Major League Baseball (MLB) between 1965 and 1983. He played the majority of his career for the New York Yankees, whom he later rejoined as a longtime broadcaster. A Gold Glove winner and five-time All-Star, and was voted to the Associated Press's American League 1970s All-Decade team. Murcer led the American League in on-base percentage in 1971, and in runs and total bases in 1972.

== Early life ==
Murcer played on the football, baseball, and basketball teams as a sophomore at Southeast High School in Oklahoma City, Oklahoma. In his junior year, he made the All-district football team. He also helped Southeast High to the conference championship in baseball. As a senior, Murcer showed his athletic abilities by making All-State in both football (the state leading scorer) and baseball and was All-City (led the city in scoring) in basketball and baseball. As a senior Murcer hit .458 and struck out only once. Later, in the winter of 1964, he signed a letter of intent to play for the Oklahoma Sooners, but in the spring of 1965 he signed a $20,000 ($204,329 today) bonus contract with the Yankees.

== Minor league career (1964–68) ==
Murcer signed a contract with Yankees' scout Tom Greenwade, the same scout who signed fellow Oklahoman Mickey Mantle (Murcer's baseball hero). Murcer signed for a $10,000 bonus in June 1964. He began with the Johnson City, rookie-level Appalachian League club in 1964 and hit .365 in 126 at bats.

The following season, 1965, he was the Carolina League MVP with the Greensboro (N.C.) Yankees, a Single-A affiliate). Murcer hit .322, homered 16 times, drove in 90 runs, and stole 18 bases, playing in his league's All-Star game that season. In 1966, he began the season with the Yankees, but was sent down to Toledo of the International League. There he was in the All-Star game once again. He hit .266 with 15 home runs and had 63 RBIs to go along with 16 steals.

While on leave from the United States Army in 1968, Murcer played seven games in the Fall Instructional League. After his discharge, he played third base for Caguas in the Puerto Rico League, where he drove in 18 runs in 22 games.

When Major League Baseball expanded from 20 to 24 teams prior to the 1969 season, the Yankees allegedly protected Murcer and Jerry Kenney from the 1968 MLB expansion draft by making a last-minute appeal to other owners to allow players that were fulfilling their military obligation to be exempt from the expansion draft, which allowed the Yankees to protect 17 players instead of 15. The Yankees devised this strategy specifically to protect Murcer, who spent 1967 and 1968 in the Army.

Playing in the minor leagues from 1964 to 1966, Murcer hit .302 which does not include his 1–12 stint with the Ft. Lauderdale Yankees in 1985 when he was attempting a comeback to the Yankees or his time with the Instructional League and the Puerto Rico League in 1968.

== Major league career ==
=== New York Yankees (1965–66, 1969–74) ===
A shortstop in the minor leagues, Murcer was slated to play the position for the Yankees but ended up being a center fielder, following in the footsteps of Mickey Mantle and Joe DiMaggio, and there were strong expectations that he would be "the next Mantle". Murcer became one of the team's most popular players of the era.

His first hit in the major leagues, in 1965, was a game-winning home run. He also played on "Mickey Mantle Day" on September 18 of that year. Murcer said playing alongside Mantle in that game was the "greatest thrill of his career". He began the 1966 season with the major league club but was sent down to Triple-A. Murcer then spent 1967–68 in the United States Army as a result of the escalation of the Vietnam War.

After returning from the Army, Murcer began the 1969 season hitting .321, with 11 homers and a league-leading 43 runs-batted-in, when he jammed his heel in Kansas City. Murcer recalled, "I laid out seven days, and I lost my groove and my momentum". He ended the season batting .259 with 26 homers and playing center field, his third defensive position, after beginning the season at third base and then switching to right field. On August 10, 1969, he was part of a feat that was perhaps the highlight of the 1969 season for Yankees' fans. Murcer, Thurman Munson, and Gene Michael hit consecutive home runs in the sixth inning against Oakland. Murcer led off the inning with a shot into the right-field bleachers. Munson, playing in only his second major league game, hit a pitch into the left-field seats, bringing up Michael, who hit a ball into the right-field seats. This was the third time Yankees hit three successive home runs. Bobby Richardson, Mickey Mantle, and Joe Pepitone did it in 1966. In 1947 Charlie Keller, Joe DiMaggio, and Johnny Lindell initially accomplished the feat.

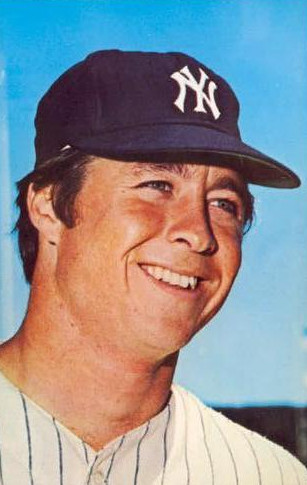
Murcer in 1970

Murcer tied for the American League (AL) lead in outfield assists in 1970 with 15, while committing only 3 errors in center field. In June 1970, Murcer hit home runs in four consecutive at-bats in a doubleheader against the Cleveland Indians, tying an American League record and joining Lou Gehrig, Johnny Blanchard, and Mickey Mantle as the only Yankees to hit home runs in four consecutive at-bats. Murcer's reported salary for both 1969 and 1970 was $27,500.

In 1971, Murcer earned a raise to $35,000 and he ended the 1971 season with a career-high .331 batting average, good for second in the AL. He led the American League in on-base percentage (.427) and times on base (266), and came in second in slugging percentage (.543) and runs (94), fourth in RBIs (94) and walks (91), fifth in intentional walks (13), and tenth in home runs (25). Murcer was seventh in MVP voting and was voted to the Sporting News All-Star team. Additionally, Murcer was Second-team All-MLB by both the Associated Press and the Newspaper Enterprise Association. On July 25, Murcer hit a pinch-hit grand slam in a win against the Milwaukee Brewers, the first of his seven career grand slams.

In 1972, with a new $65,000 salary, Murcer recorded a career-high 30 doubles (third in the AL), 7 triples (fourth), 33 home runs (second), and 96 RBIs (third). He also led the AL in runs scored (102), extra-base hits (70), and total bases (314), was third in slugging percentage (.537) and hits (171), and 10th in batting (.292). He came in fifth in the AL MVP voting and won a Gold Glove for his fielding. Murcer was fourth in the AL in fielding percentage (.992) led the league in putouts (382), and was third in outfield assists with eleven. On August 29, Murcer hit for the cycle. On June 3, Murcer's five runs scored in a game marked the 11th time it had been done in Yankees history. He was named to the Sporting News All-Star team again and Murcer's 33 home runs were the most by a Yankees centerfielder since Mickey Mantle hit 35 in 1964. No Yankee center fielder topped that mark until 2011 when Curtis Granderson hit 41. Again he was named to The Sporting News AL All-Star team and was Second-team All-MLB by both the AP and NEA.

On March 6, 1973, Murcer asked for and received a $100,000 salary for the upcoming season, making him only the third Yankee to make six figures. For that season Murcer was third in the league in hits (187), fourth in batting (.301), and seventh in RBIs (95). He was ninth in the MVP voting. He also led the American League in assists for the second time in four years, with 14. He made the Sporting News All-Star team for the third time in his career and for the third time in three seasons he was Second-team All-MLB by both the AP and NEA. He narrowly missed his second Gold Glove, finishing fourth in the voting among American League outfielders. He finished with 17 game-winning hits, second to AL MVP Reggie Jackson's 18. On July 13, Murcer hit three home runs for the second time in his career and drove in all five runs in a 5–0 win over the Kansas City Royals.

On June 30, 1973, baseball Commissioner Bowie Kuhn fined Murcer $250 for saying that Kuhn didn't have the "guts" to stop Hall of Fame pitcher Gaylord Perry from throwing the spitball. That night, Murcer hit a two-run homer off Perry that put the Yankees ahead in a 7–2 victory over the Cleveland Indians. Murcer had made his original comment about Kuhn after Perry beat New York the previous week, which ended the Yankees' eight-game winning streak. Kuhn said Murcer apologized in their meeting but Murcer refused to tell newsmen that he had, and he "didn't sound too contrite". Murcer, who flung his right hand into the air when he rounded first after hitting the homer, said to reporters "I hit a hanging spitter."

For his career, Murcer hit Perry at a .232 clip with two home runs in 69 at-bats. However, much of that low batting average was due to the 2 for 20 performance in the 1972 season, which caused Murcer's ire in the first place. Aside from the abysmal 1972 summer, he had against Perry, who won the A.L. Cy Young Award that year, Murcer hit .286 against him.

Murcer also had some fun with Perry; he once caught a fly for the last out of an inning and spit on the ball before tossing it to him. Another time he sent Perry a gallon of lard. Perry retaliated by having a mutual acquaintance cover his hand with grease before shaking hands with Murcer and saying "Gaylord says hello."

In early 1974, Murcer and Mickey Mantle flew to Washington, D.C. to visit with Senator Ted Kennedy's son, Teddy, whose right leg had recently been amputated due to cancer. Murcer and Mantle traveled at Senator Kennedy's request and George Steinbrenner's expense.

Murcer, who had hit 25 homers with regularity, found it hard to hit home runs at Shea Stadium, where the Yankees played in 1974 and 1975 while Yankee Stadium was renovated. In the 1974 season, Murcer hit only two home runs at Shea, on consecutive days, (September 21 and 22, 1974).

In 1974 Murcer led all major league outfielders in assists by throwing out 21 baserunners. He was second in the AL in sacrifice flies (12), seventh in RBIs (88), and ninth in intentional walks (10), and was an American League All-Star for the fourth consecutive season and was the highest-paid player in Yankee history, earning $120,000.

=== San Francisco Giants (1975–76) ===
After the 1974 season, the Yankees traded Murcer to the San Francisco Giants for Bobby Bonds. Early on October 22, Gabe Paul called Murcer to say he had been traded straight up to San Francisco for Bobby Bonds. "The trade came", he remembered, "just after I had told Gabe I could finally accept right field if I knew I would be a Yankee the rest of my career. He said there was no way the Yankees could trade me. Three days later, I was gone."

In 1975, wearing uniform #20, Murcer led the National League in sacrifice flies with 12 and was 5th in walks with 91 drove in 91 runs, and batted .298. He also led the Giants in game-winning hits with 13. Additionally, he was fourth among NL right fielders in fielding percentage with .981. On May 24, 1975, Murcer went 2 for 3 with a triple and a home run and had a career-high 6 RBIs in a win over the Cubs. That week he won the first of two National League Player of the Week awards. (He won the second two weeks later when he hit .483 for the week, including one home run and seven RBI). He played in his fifth All-Star game and was Second-team All-National League by United Press International.

However, despite a fine offensive season, he hit only 11 home runs, eliciting this quote from Murcer, "Patty Hearst could be hiding in Candlestick's upper deck and nobody would ever find her", referring to how tough it was to hit long balls at the park where the Giants played their home games. Author Zander Hollander noted that season that "only Murcer's dwindling power keeps him from superstar status" since other than the lack of home runs Murcer had a fine year in his first season as a Giant.

On April 6, 1976, the Associated Press reported that Murcer signed for a reported $175,000, making him the highest-paid player in Giants history and gave him about a $25,000 raise over his 1975 salary. That season Murcer regained his power swing and was 6th in the NL with 23 home runs, and 7th in RBIs (90). He walked 84 times which was sixth in the NL. He was also voted the Giants MVP after leading the Giants in home runs and tied for the team lead in steals with 12 and was second on the club with 10 game-winning RBI. His two consecutive seasons with 90 or more RBIs was not duplicated by a San Francisco Giant until Will Clark did it in 1987–88.

On May 26, 1976, Murcer hit a grand slam against the Astros and on September 22, 1976, he stole home in a 3–1 victory against the rival Dodgers and a week later, on September 29, 1976, he gloved the final out in John Montefusco's no-hitter.

=== Chicago Cubs (1977–79) ===
The Giants traded Murcer, Steve Ontiveros, and minor-league right-handed pitcher Andy Muhlstock to the Chicago Cubs for Bill Madlock and Rob Sperring on February 11, 1977. On March 6, 1977, Murcer signed his first-ever multi-year deal, calling for $1.6 million over five seasons. The contract made him the highest-paid Cub player in history. In the span of four years, Murcer held that distinction for three franchises, the Yankees, Giants and Cubs. As a tribute to Mantle, Murcer wore #7 with the Cubs.

That year he led the league with ten sacrifice flies and was eighth in intentional walks (13) while hitting 27 home runs and driving in 89 runs which led the team. Murcer also tied for the team lead (with Bill Buckner) in game-winning hits with nine. His 16 steals were second on the club and he drew 80 bases on balls, good for 9th in the NL. Also, Murcer was third among all NL right-fielders in assists. He was voted to the UPI All-National League team making it six times in seven seasons he received some kind of post-season honor by a national press organization. On June 29, 1977, in his return to Candlestick Park, Murcer drove in 6 runs (matching his career-high) in a 10–9 win over the Giants. On September 26, 1977, Murcer hit the 200th home run of his career, off future broadcast partner Jim Kaat.

On August 8, 1977, Murcer promised to try to hit a home run and a double for terminally ill fan Scott Crull whom he had spoken to by phone. That night, against the Pittsburgh Pirates, Murcer hit two home runs. Broadcasting the game nationally on ABC, Keith Jackson told the country how Murcer had fulfilled the dying boy's last wish. However, no one had told the young man he was dying. Murcer, however, denied he made an outright promise to Crull, as ABC had reported during the game.

Scott's mother told the AP, "It's wonderful that he got to talk to one of the players, and by Murcer hitting the home runs...he was thrilled." The AP later reported comments from Kenneth Crull, the young boy's uncle, that "Bobby Murcer did a wonderful thing for Scotty . . . it was the highlight of his whole life." Linda Crull, the boy's aunt, added, "What Bobby Murcer did was great. But what happened afterward we'd just as soon forget about." ABC's Jackson had relayed the story that had been told to him by a Chicago Cub official Buck Peden and alerted the boy to his own medical condition. Three weeks later, on August 22, Crull died. Ten hours later the Cubs beat the Giants 3–2 at Wrigley Field and Murcer hit his 24th home run. At that point, the Cubs' record was 70–53, and they were 7 1/2 games out, in second place. The Cubs slumped and finished at .500 with an 81–81 record. The homer in the August 22, 1977, "Scott Crull" game was one of 5 game-winning home runs Murcer had in 1977.

In 1978 he was eighth in the league with 15 intentional walks and walked a total of 80 times, which was ninth in the NL for the second time in a row. He also had one stretch of eight straight hits, a feat not duplicated by a Cubs player until Andre Dawson did it in 1989. Previously only Billy Williams, in 1972, was the only Chicago Cubs player to perform that feat. Murcer is one of seven Cubs to have three multiple intentional-walk games since 1960, joining Ernie Banks, Sammy Sosa, Billy Williams, Don Kessinger, Derek Lee, and Andre Dawson. Murcer, on April 25, 1978, hit a grand slam off Steve Carlton in a 4–2 win versus the Philadelphia Phillies. On September 10, 1978, Murcer went 5 for 5, the only 5-hit game of his career.

During 4 1/2 seasons in the National League, Murcer was particularly rough on the Los Angeles Dodgers. In 63 games against them Murcer hit .347 with 11 homers and had a slugging percentage of .538.

=== New York Yankees (1979–83) ===
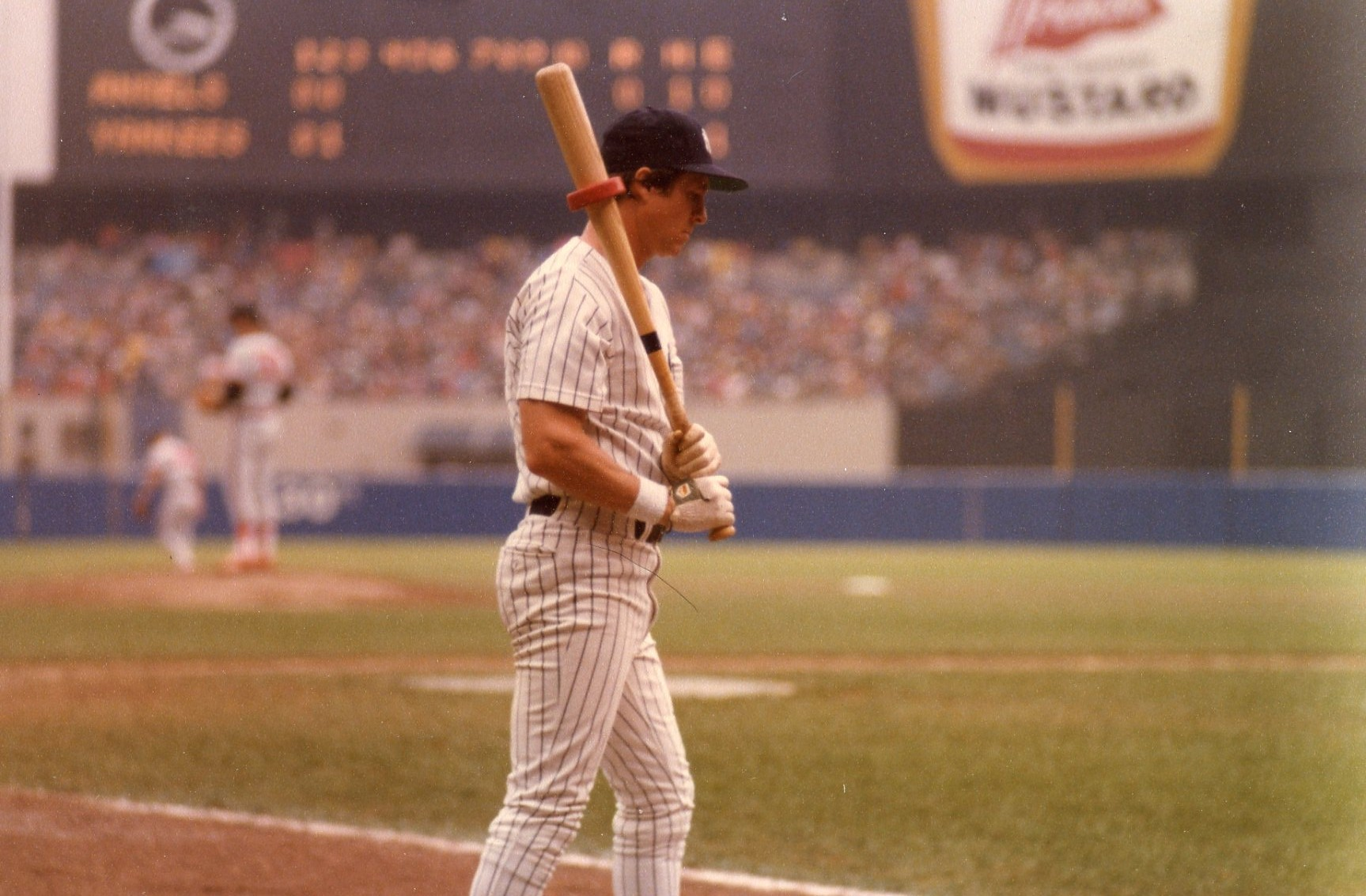
Murcer on deck at Yankee Stadium, 1979.

On June 26, 1979, Murcer returned to the Yankees in a trade for Paul Semall and cash. After wearing uniform #1 from 1969 through 1974, Murcer donned jersey #2, when manager Billy Martin re-adopted the #1.

On August 2, 1979, Yankees catcher/captain Thurman Munson died in a plane crash. Murcer gave one of the eulogies at his funeral on August 6 in Canton, Ohio, in which he quoted the poet and philosopher Angelo Patri: "The life of a soul on earth lasts longer than his departure. He lives on in your life and the life of all others who knew him." Afterward, the team flew home to play the first-place Baltimore Orioles in a game which was broadcast nationally on ABC-TV. Yankee manager Billy Martin wanted to give Murcer the day off, but Murcer insisted on playing. He practically won the game single-handedly, bringing the Yankees back from a 4–0 deficit with a three-run homer in the seventh inning, then hitting a walk-off three-run single down the left-field line in the bottom of the ninth, causing Howard Cosell to exclaim what a heroic performance Murcer had put on. Murcer never used the bat from the game again and gave it to Munson's widow, Diana.

On July 2, 2004, the Seattle Times reported that Diana Munson put the bat, along with other items of Munson's, up for auction. Mrs. Munson said she wanted to use the proceeds to open trust funds for her grandchildren. "You reach an age when you think about the future", she said. In August 2007, the YES Network replayed the game for a new generation of Yankee fans due to a switch of the copyright of the game from ABC to Major League Baseball. About the game, Murcer says that he was playing on "shock adrenaline" and that the game has become "part of my legacy".

After the murder of NFL player Sean Taylor, The Washington Post asked Murcer about how an organization deals with such a tragedy, "You can't forget the moment, because it's so emotional", said Murcer, "It's a very moving experience ... that next game, we got to remember him as an individual and as a team. But it's not only us that's hurting. It's the fans. It's as much for them as it is for you as an individual. It reminds you that the fans who follow the team, it's as big a part of their lives as it is for you."

Murcer was fifth in the league in 1980 with nine sacrifice flies. Murcer cracked a two-out, two-run homer in the ninth inning on June 14, 1980, rallying the Yankees to a win over the Oakland A's. On July 4, 1980, Murcer hit a grand slam in an 11–5 rout of the Cleveland Indians. He was also credited with 13 game-winning RBIs in his first full season back from the National League. For the remaining years with the Yankees, he was a part time player and less of a star.

In the winter between the 1980 and 1981 season, Murcer traveled to Japan with an American League "All-Star" team to play a series of exhibition games against a National League team to promote American baseball.

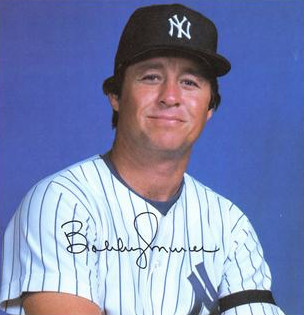
Murcer in 1981

On Opening Day in 1981 vs Texas, Murcer hit a pinch-hit grand slam at Yankee Stadium. Alfonso Soriano and Russ Derry are the only other two Yankees to achieve that feat. On September 26, 1981, he hit a three-run pinch-hit homer in the ninth inning in a 6–4 Yankee win over Baltimore. In 1981, he led the pinch hitters of the American League with three home runs and 12 RBIs. He also led the club in slugging percentage (.470). He finished the season by batting as designated hitter in the 1981 World Series.

Prior to the 1982 season, Murcer signed a three-year, $1.12 million contract with the Yankees. On July 28, 1982, Murcer hit a three-run pinch-hit home run to defeat the Detroit Tigers.

On June 1, 1983, Murcer hit his 100th home run at Yankee Stadium, which was the 252nd and final home run of his career. His retirement on June 20, 1983, was hastened by the Yankees wanting to bring up rookie first baseman/outfielder Don Mattingly. Murcer was the last active player to have been a playing teammate of Mickey Mantle. His final game came on June 11, and on August 7, 1983, the Yankees honored him with "Bobby Murcer Day". Since baseball's contracts are guaranteed, Murcer collected the remainder of his contract (estimated at $360,000 a year) through 1984. A 1985 comeback attempt ended after four minor league games in which Murcer went 1 for 12 before suffering a shoulder injury.

Once while playing with the Yankees, he and two other teammates got caught in a bizarre 2–5–3–1 triple play. During his second tenure with the Yankees, he also served as the team's player union representative. He was, at various points in his career, the highest-paid Yankee, Giant, and Cub up to that point, and in his 17 years in the Major Leagues Murcer earned just shy of $3 million, including the signing bonus he received in the 1960s, meaning his career average was around $173,000.

== Player profile ==
A left-handed hitter, Murcer had a career .277 batting average, finishing with 252 home runs and 1,043 RBIs. He hit .301 with runners on third base. He was only the third New York Yankee (after Joe DiMaggio and Mickey Mantle) to earn $100,000 per season, and at 26 years of age was the youngest American League player to earn a six-figure salary. Murcer made the All-Star teams from 1971 through 1974 in the American League, and in 1975 in the National League. He also won a Gold Glove in 1972.

He was noted for excelling at the delayed steal in which, as the catcher catches the ball or is about to throw the ball back to the pitcher, the runner on first base breaks for second base. The thought is that the second baseman and shortstop will be back on their heels and slow to cover the bag. After working with Mickey Mantle, he was also known as an excellent drag bunter.

At his retirement, Murcer's 252 career home runs were tied for 72nd place on the all-time home run list, and his 175 home runs as a Yankee put him 11th on the club's career list. At his death, Murcer was tied for 183rd on the all-time list.

In the 1970s, Murcer drove in 840 runs, the 9th most in the major leagues during that span. Murcer's 119 outfield assists led all major league outfielders for that decade, ahead of Bobby Bonds (106), Rusty Staub (97), Amos Otis (93), Reggie Smith (86), José Cardenal (85), Del Unser (82), and Reggie Jackson (81). His 198 homers tied for 17th in the major leagues for the 1970s, and his .282 batting average was 20th among all players who had 5,000 or more plate appearances. During the 1970s, he led his club in home runs six times (1970, 71, 72, 73, 76, 77).

In MLB history only 32 players hit above .275 while also hitting 250 or more home runs, driving in more than 1,000 runs, and stealing more than 125 bases and totaling 45 or more triples. Among that elite group only Murcer, George Brett, Vladimir Guerrero, and Rogers Hornsby struck out fewer than 1,000 times.

== Honors ==
- 1963 Battlefield League Most Improved Player
- 1965 Carolina League Most Valuable Player
- 1969 Voted "Most Popular Yankee" by the Catholic Youth Organization in NYC.
- 1971 AL All-Star team; TSN AL All-Star; Second-team All-MLB (AP, NEA)
- 1972 AL All-Star team; TSN AL All-Star; Second-team All-MLB (AP, NEA); Gold Glove
- 1973 AL All-Star team; TSN AL All-Star; Second-team All-MLB (AP, NEA)
- 1974 AL All-Star team
- 1975 NL All-Star team; Second-team All-NL (UPI)
- 1977 Second-team All-NL (UPI)
- 1993 inducted into the Oklahoma Sports Hall of Fame
- 1990s The Oklahoma Sports Museum's Bill Teegins Award winner.
- 2000 Named as one of the top 100 athletes in Oklahoma history
- 2004 Inducted Oklahoma Hall of Fame.
- 2005 Received the Legend Award for his "lone and meritorious service to baseball" by the Association for the Help of Retarded Children
- 2007 honored by Oklahoma City University with the Abe Lemons/Paul Hansen Award for Sports Excellence. The Abe Lemons/Paul Hansen Award recognizes an individual who significantly contributes to the growth of sports in the state.
- 2007 featured as one of "100 Leaders for the Next 100 Years" by Oklahoma Sports Heritage Museum.

== Post-playing career ==
Murcer was also involved in the team as management and part-time coach as well. He was an assistant Yankee general manager in 1985, and individually worked with Rickey Henderson's rehab efforts when Henderson was brought to the Yankees. In 1987, George Steinbrenner hired Murcer to coach left-handed hitters. In 1989, he became partial owner of the Class AAA baseball team in Oklahoma, the Oklahoma City 89ers. He was also a regular at the annual Yankees Old Timer's Game, playing his last game in 2007.

=== Broadcasting ===
After his retirement, Murcer turned to a career in broadcasting. He was a sportscaster for the Yankees—on broadcast TV, radio, and the YES Network—for most of the two decades. He and colleague Frank Messer were behind the WPIX microphones as the infamous pine tar incident unfolded at Yankee Stadium on July 24, 1983. Murcer also worked games for NBC, teaming with Ted Robinson.

Murcer continued to call games on WPIX until 1998, when the station lost the rights to broadcast the Yankees (they picked up the broadcast rights to the New York Mets instead). He then moved to WNYW, where he and Tim McCarver (and later Suzyn Waldman) shared play-by-play roles. He remained there until 2001 (calling, among other games, David Cone's 1999 perfect game), and then moved to the YES Network to call the games there and on its broadcast partners (originally WCBS, now WWOR-TV), with a reduced workload. Murcer won three Emmy Awards for live sports coverage as the voice of the Yankees.

In November 2007, Murcer was nominated for the Ford C. Frick Award, presented annually to a broadcaster for "major contributions to baseball" by the Baseball Hall of Fame. The 2008 award, as announced three months later, went to longtime Seattle broadcaster Dave Niehaus.

=== Anti-tobacco activism ===
Murcer was a tobacco user for most of his life. In the late 1990s, he conceded what he thought was the error of his ways. After having a family member that suffered from cancer, Murcer became an anti-tobacco activist, according to the AP. The Senate of the State of Oklahoma passed Senate Bill 619 that purported to "beef up local regulation of tobacco sales to minors". The bill was passed by the lower chamber and signed into law.

=== Opinions on the Mitchell Report ===
Murcer defended Yankee pitchers Roger Clemens and Andy Pettitte, who were accused of using performance-enhancing drugs in the Mitchell Report, which was released in December 2007. Murcer was quoted in the Daily Oklahoman as saying, "Roger or Andy, either one, have never been accused of taking illegal drugs", Murcer said. "I mean, they never tested positive for any of that." He further added, "I can't convict somebody on allegations" and "with all the testing that's going on today, and Andy and Roger never testing positive for anything, I can't assume somebody's guilty based on the testimony of a disgruntled trainer."

=== Autobiography ===
In May 2008, Murcer's autobiography, Yankee for Life: My 40-Year Journey in Pinstripes, was published by HarperCollins. The book received widespread critical acclaim. The book was a retrospective on Murcer's baseball career and also his personal struggles with illness. It covers the pressure of being the "next Mickey Mantle", his disappointment at being traded away from the Yankees, his "feud" with Gaylord Perry, and lists his "1965–2007 Yankee All-Star team".

== In the media ==
Aside from his broadcasting, Murcer was active in the media. He had guest appearances on Beat the Clock, Hee Haw, What's My Line? (as a mystery guest), Let's Make a Deal, appeared in national television ads in the late 1970s along with Carlton Fisk endorsing the dipping tobacco Skoal, and was a guest VJ on MTV with Billy Martin in July 1986. In 1988 Murcer entered and finished the New York City Marathon.

He recorded two country songs, "Skoal Dippin' Man" and "Bad Whiskey" in 1982, both released by Columbia Records, and appeared in two films as himself, including The Scout. He was also part of a four-player biography in 1973, "At Bat!: Aaron-Murcer-Bench-Jackson", by Bill Gutman, published by Tempo Books.

== Personal life ==
Murcer married his high school sweetheart, Diana Kay Rhodes (known as "Kay"), in 1966. They were married for 42 years until his death, and had two children, Tori and Todd.

In July 2006, Aduddell Industries of Oklahoma City named Murcer as corporate spokesperson.

During his career, he invested in jewelry stores, an oil drilling company, a hair cutting establishment franchise called Yankee Cuts, and racehorses.

Murcer was involved with many charities, including serving as the chairman of the board of the Baseball Assistance Team (B.A.T.), which grants money to former players and other baseball figures who are in need, and holding an annual golf tournament which has raised more than $1 million for the American Cancer Society since 1990. In 1995, he joined with fellow Oklahoman Mickey Mantle to raise money for the victims of the Alfred P. Murrah Federal Building bombing. B.A.T. presents an annual "Bobby Murcer Award" to the two major league teams (one AL and one NL) whose players commit the most resources to the organization.

Murcer also appeared in celebrity rodeos for various charitable organizations showing his skills in riding horses and roping.

== Illness and death ==
According to the New York Daily News, Murcer had been suffering from headaches and a lack of energy. He was diagnosed with a brain tumor (glioblastoma multiforme) on Christmas Eve, 2006, and underwent surgery four days later at The University of Texas M. D. Anderson Cancer Center in Houston. On January 10, 2007, it was announced that the tumor was malignant.

Murcer made his first post-operative appearance on fellow Yankee broadcaster Michael Kay's radio show on WEPN on January 23, 2007. He was interviewed by Kay and took phone calls from listeners. Murcer concluded the interview by saying, "I want to thank you very much for giving me the forum to do this because I wanted you to know that even though this looks bad, I'm doing great. I really am. I'm in a great place. God has given me peace and the overwhelming love has been insurmountable for me to even deal with. I can feel the fans. I can feel their thoughts and their prayers and I wanted to tell them how much I love them."

Murcer returned to Yankee Stadium for Opening Day of the 2007 season. He called an inning with the YES Network crew, and once his presence was pointed out on the video scoreboard, he received a standing ovation from the crowd, with the Yankees coming out of the dugout to applaud him. He returned to work as an announcer in the booth on May 1, 2007.

The Tug McGraw Foundation, which supports research to improve quality of life for brain tumor patients and their families, honored Murcer as their "Good Guy of 2007". The award was given at the "Denim & Diamonds: An Evening with Tim McGraw and Friends" on November 2, 2007, St. Louis.

In January 2008, he was honored by the New York Chapter of the BBWA as the winner of the "You Gotta Have Heart" award for his battle against cancer.

In late February 2008, an MRI scan led Murcer's doctors to perform a biopsy, and, optimistically, the biopsy revealed scar tissue, rather than a recurrence of brain cancer. Murcer stated he planned to rest until spring training where he planned to call Yankee games and work in the YES Network studio. He released his autobiography Yankee For Life, co-authored with Glen Waggoner, on May 20; he appeared in the broadcast booth for the last time two weeks earlier to promote it. The book dealt with his forty years in Major League Baseball and his battle with brain cancer. His last public appearance was May 27, in New York while promoting his book, signing autographs for 2,000 fans despite being frail and physically weak. In addition, he had planned to work 60 Yankee home games for the 2008 season.

On June 30, Murcer's family released a statement that he had suffered a relapse:

Bobby Murcer continues to recover from the effects of cancer and shingles, which caused him to cut short his broadcasting work and his book tour earlier this month. He has been under medical care in Oklahoma City.

The cancer treatment over the last 18 months has been intensive and has, as a side effect, somewhat compromised his immune system and made the fight all the more challenging. While he has shown some measured improvement in recent days, this is clearly a major battle, as all who have been through it understand.

Bobby remains hopeful that he will be able to resume his broadcasting work down the road, but for now, is appreciative of the thoughts and prayers of his fans, and wants them to know that he is aware that he is in their hearts, as they are in his.

Two weeks later, on July 12, Nancy Newman of the Yankees' YES Network reported that Murcer had died due to complications related to brain cancer. He was reportedly surrounded by family in his deathbed at Mercy Hospital in his hometown of Oklahoma City. Yankees owner George Steinbrenner issued a statement following his death: "Bobby Murcer was a born Yankee, a great guy, very well-liked and a true friend of mine. I extend my deepest sympathies to his wife Kay, their children and grandchildren. I will really miss the guy." Baseball commissioner Bud Selig eulogized, "All of Major League Baseball is saddened today by the passing of Bobby Murcer, particularly on the eve of this historic All-Star game at Yankee Stadium, a place he called home for so many years. Bobby was a gentleman, a great ambassador for baseball, and a true leader both on and off the field. He was a man of great heart and compassion."

The memorial service for Murcer was held in Oklahoma City on August 6, 2008, at the Memorial Road Church of Christ. Among the 2,000 attending the service were Reggie Jackson, Derek Jeter, Andy Pettitte and Joe Girardi. Also in attendance was Diana Munson, the widow of Yankee captain Thurman Munson. The August 6 date was 29 years to the day since Murcer gave the eulogy at Thurman Munson's funeral and is also the 25th anniversary of Bobby Murcer Day at Yankee Stadium. The uniform worn by Murcer at his final Yankee Stadium Old Timer's Day appearance in 2007 was presented to his spouse Kay. His tomb is located at the Rose Hill Mausoleum in Oklahoma City, on the left side of the building.

== See also ==
- List of Major League Baseball career home run leaders
- List of Major League Baseball career runs batted in leaders
- List of Major League Baseball players to hit for the cycle
- List of Major League Baseball annual runs scored leaders

== Notes ==
Achievements
Preceded by César Cedeño	Hitting for the cycle August 29, 1972	Succeeded by César Tovar
