= Bob Gamere =

American former sportscaster (born 1939)

- Born: November 1, 1939 (age 86); Worcester, Massachusetts, U.S.
- Occupation: Sportscaster
- Television: Candlepins for Cash
- Criminal charge: Possessing child pornography
- Criminal penalty: Five years in prison
- Criminal status: Sentence served

Robert Charles Gamere (born November 1, 1939) is an American former sportscaster. He primarily worked in the Boston area and hosted a local candlepin bowling show during the 1970s named Candlepins for Cash.

== Career ==
Gamere started his broadcasting career calling Holy Cross football and basketball games for WTAG. In 1970 he was hired to succeed Jerry Coleman on the New York Yankees broadcast team. He was chosen out of over 500 applicants for the job. His audition tape was of a basketball game, as he had never called a baseball game before. He was criticized for his overuse of the catch phrase "Here it comes, there it goes" to describe a pitch thrown to home plate and batted anywhere. He was replaced after one season by Bill White.

Gamere's career then moved to Boston. From 1973 to 1980 he hosted Candlepins for Cash on WNAC, as well as calling ECAC Hockey with John Carlson. Carlson called the first and third period with Gamere on color. During the second period, Gamere would be on play by play with Carlson on color. After his dismissal, he moved to WMRE as host of their nightly sports call-in show. In 1984, Gamere began a five-year stint as a sports anchor at WLVI-TV. He was fired in 1989 after charges of assault and sexual harassment were brought against him by a Malden man. The charges were eventually dropped, but he was not rehired by Channel 56. That year, he began hosting a weekend midnight to 5:00 a.m. sports talk show on WRCA and a nightly sports show on Channel 25. In 1990, he began a career in sports betting calling himself "The Great Gamere", hosting an NFL pay-per-view betting show, handicapping, and running a sports book. From 1994 to 1996, he worked for WNDS, calling UMass Lowell hockey games and horse races from Rockingham Park.

From 1982 to 1989, he was the play by play man for Harvard football on WMRE, WDLW, and WTAG. Gamere had been sports director at WTAG in the late 1960s and hosted an issue-oriented talk show called "Talk of Town" from 6:30 to 8:00 p.m. on weeknights.

== Legal issues ==
=== Fenway attack ===
On June 15, 1988, Gamere was stabbed four times while walking in the Fenway section of Boston.

=== Sexual harassment allegation ===
Gamere was fired by television station WLVI-TV in 1989 after charges of assault and sexual harassment were brought against him by a man from Malden, Massachusetts. The charges were later dropped.

=== Child pornography conviction ===
On October 23, 2008, Gamere was arrested and arraigned on charges of transporting and possessing child pornography. According to court documents, the FBI had been investigating Gamere as far back as 2005 when they alleged he e-mailed videos of children having sex with each other and adults. Gamere pleaded not guilty in US District Court in Boston.

The Boston Herald reported on September 5, 2009, that Gamere was expected to plead guilty to child pornography charges. The BostonChannel.com reported on January 19, 2010, that Gamere had been sentenced to five years in prison on child pornography charges. He was released on May 27, 2014.
