= Frank Messer =

American sportscaster (1925–2001)

- Frank Messer
- Born: Wallace Frank Messer; August 8, 1925; Asheville, North Carolina, U.S.
- Died: November 13, 2001 (aged 76); Deerfield Beach, Florida, U.S.
- Occupation: Sportscaster

Wallace Frank Messer (August 8, 1925 – November 13, 2001) was an American sportscaster who was best known for his 18 seasons announcing New York Yankees baseball games, and as the recognizable emcee voice of various Yankee Stadium festivities during a three decade span.

== Background ==
An Asheville, North Carolina native, Messer was a member of the Marines during World War II in the South Pacific. After the war, he worked as a broadcaster in minor league baseball including the Richmond Virginians of the International League from 1954 to 1963. He got his major-league break when he joined the Baltimore Orioles and worked alongside their noted longtime voice, Chuck Thompson.

In 1966, Bill O'Donnell also joined the broadcast crew, the O's won their first world championship. Messer also called Baltimore Colts football during the 1960s including the 1964 NFL Championship Game with John Steadman.

Messer's next major-league break came after the 1967 season, when Joe Garagiola left the Yankees broadcast crew to concentrate on the network jobs he also had at NBC Sports and NBC News. Messer took Garagiola's place for 1968, working with ex-Yankees Jerry Coleman and Phil Rizzuto. The Yankees' longtime public-relations director Bob Fishel had urged team management to approve a traditional play-by-play sportscaster, which the Yanks had not had since the firing of Red Barber after the 1966 season.

Messer was eventually given the gig of emceeing the Old-Timer's Day ceremonies by 1970 – an event in which he participated until the year before his death – and special events, beginning with the retirement of Mickey Mantle's Number 7 jersey in June 1969. Messer's steadiness and dry wit blended well with Rizzuto's enthusiasm.

The Yankee broadcast crew gained its best known incarnation in 1971, when Messer and Rizzuto were joined by former St. Louis Cardinals first baseman Bill White, a replacement for Bob Gamere (who'd been brought in when Coleman moved to the West Coast after the 1969 season). Messer, White and Rizzuto called Yankee games together until the end of the 1985 season. While Messer was relegated to radio for his final year, the trio still provided the third-longest three-man combination in New York sports history, (behind the original New York Mets crew of Lindsey Nelson, Ralph Kiner and Bob Murphy, and their current crew of Gary Cohen, Ron Darling and Keith Hernandez). During that stretch, the trio was also joined by Dom Valentino on radio for the 1975 season, Fran Healy on radio and cable TV from 1978 to 1983, John Gordon on radio from 1982 to 1985, Bobby Murcer on WPIX in 1983 and 1984, and by the ultimate Voice of the Yankees, Mel Allen, on cable from 1979 to 1985.

Messer was acclaimed by critics and fans both for his straight-shooting play calling on radio and TV, and by the club for his effectiveness promoting team events. Messer had a mellow play-by-play style, similar to Curt Gowdy. Neither of the two announcers typically raised his voice very high when a dramatic or memorable play took place. "We call Frank 'Old Reliable' up here, because we know when we're in trouble, he is here", Rizzuto said on the final 1973 Yankee broadcast before the renovation of the original Yankee Stadium. One of Messer's signature phrases at the end of his last inning before switching booths from radio to TV (or vice versa) was "(Announcer) will carry you along the rest of the way. It's been a pleasure." Another was his radio call of a home run from 1981 onward, when the Yankees' radio home was WABC: "A-B-C you later!"

Besides Mickey Mantle Day, Messer's notable Yankee moments included his 1978 call of Bucky Dent's dramatic three-run homer in the American League East Championship Game against the host Boston Red Sox; and his 1980 call of Reggie Jackson's 400th home run ("There she goes! Might be upper deck!"), both on WINS radio. The usual Rizzuto-Messer-White broadcast trifecta of the Yankees carried the ALCS on radio and TV in 1976, 1977, 1978, 1980, and 1981 (plus a 1981 Division Series), providing New York City metropolitan area fans a local alternative to the national broadcasts. Messer handled the post-game clubhouse celebration after the Chris Chambliss home run that won the 1976 ALCS.

== A Star-Spangled Fourth ==
Messer's most famous call may have been his description on WABC of the final out of Dave Righetti's no-hitter at Yankee Stadium against the Red Sox, on July 4, 1983: As Righetti got Wade Boggs to swing at strike three, Messer intoned:

The kick, and the pitch...he STRUCK HIM OUT! Righetti has pitched a no-hitter! Dave Righetti has pitched a no-hitter! He strikes out Boggs for the final out of the ball game, and the Yankees POUR onto the field to congratulate Dave Righetti!

According to the book Sports on New York Radio by Westwood One, media executive and former sportscaster David J. Halberstam, the call should have been made by partner White, who was to call that half-inning as part of the in-game rotation of announcers between radio and SportsChannel TV (now MSG Plus). While White did the whole game bouncing between WABC and SportsChannel, Messer and Rizzuto rotated between TV, radio and the Fan Appreciation Day giveaways on the field between innings.

But according to Messer, after White saw him return to the WABC radio booth (he helped White call the last half of the eighth inning), White insisted that Messer, the senior of the two, should call the ninth.

== A Tar-Spangled Sunday ==
Another Messer moment came less than three weeks later, on July 24, 1983. The Kansas City Royals were playing the Yankees at Yankee Stadium. In the top of the ninth inning, George Brett came to bat against Rich (Goose) Gossage, his old rival. Brett hit a two-run homer, putting the Royals ahead 5–4. After Brett rounded the bases, Yankees manager Billy Martin (at the suggestion of his protégé, third baseman Graig Nettles) came out of the dugout and urged home-plate umpire Tim McClelland to measure the amount of pine tar on Brett's bat, citing an obscure rule that stated the pine tar on a bat could extend no further than 18 inches. Brett's pine tar extended about 24 inches.

"I've never seen this", said sportscaster and ex-Yankee Bobby Murcer on WPIX as he watched McClelland measure the bat across the plate. "I never have either", said Messer. A few moments later, McClelland signalled Brett out.

The normally mild-mannered Brett charged out of the dugout, enraged, and was immediately ejected. An incredulous Messer:

He's out! Look at this!...He is out, and having to be forcibly restrained from hitting plate umpire Tim McClelland. And the Yankees have won the ball game 4 to 3!

The Royals protested the game, and their protest was upheld by American League President (and former Yankees chief executive) Lee MacPhail, who ruled that the bat was not "altered to improve the distance factor", and that the rules only provided for removal of the bat from the game, and not calling the batter out.

The game was resumed, starting after Brett's homer. Martin, appealing the play before, said the umpires had no way of knowing Brett had touched all the bases. The umpires produced affidavits saying he had. The game had virtually no effect on 1983's pennant race, but was in many ways the closing chapter on a heated rivalry.

== Later years ==
Messer's final Yankee broadcast was the last game of the 1985 regular season when he called the play-by-play of Phil Niekro's 300th win. In the off-season, he was abruptly dismissed after 18 years and offered a reassignment to the front office. "After all the years I had been here, I would have thought that somebody in management, a George Steinbrenner or Clyde King, would have told me they were removing me from the booth. They left it up to Art Adler, who is in charge of Yankees radio. That disturbed me." He was allowed to leave outright when he received an offer to do Chicago White Sox games, which he did with Don Drysdale in 1986 and 1987. Messer also did baseball for CBS Radio in 1991.

Messer continued to emcee Old-Timer's Day ceremonies for the Yankees from 1988 through 1997. One of his most poignant jobs was introducing Mickey Mantle at the 1994 event, just after Mantle had completed treatment for alcoholism. Even after John Sterling and Michael Kay took over the introduction of players in the late 1990s, Messer was still the event "host" through 2000, greeting the Stadium fans before turning over the rest of the show to his successors.

Messer died at his Deerfield Beach, Florida home on November 13, 2001, aged 76, from complications of heart problems and lupus.
