= Gene Michael =

American baseball player, executive and manager (1938–2017)

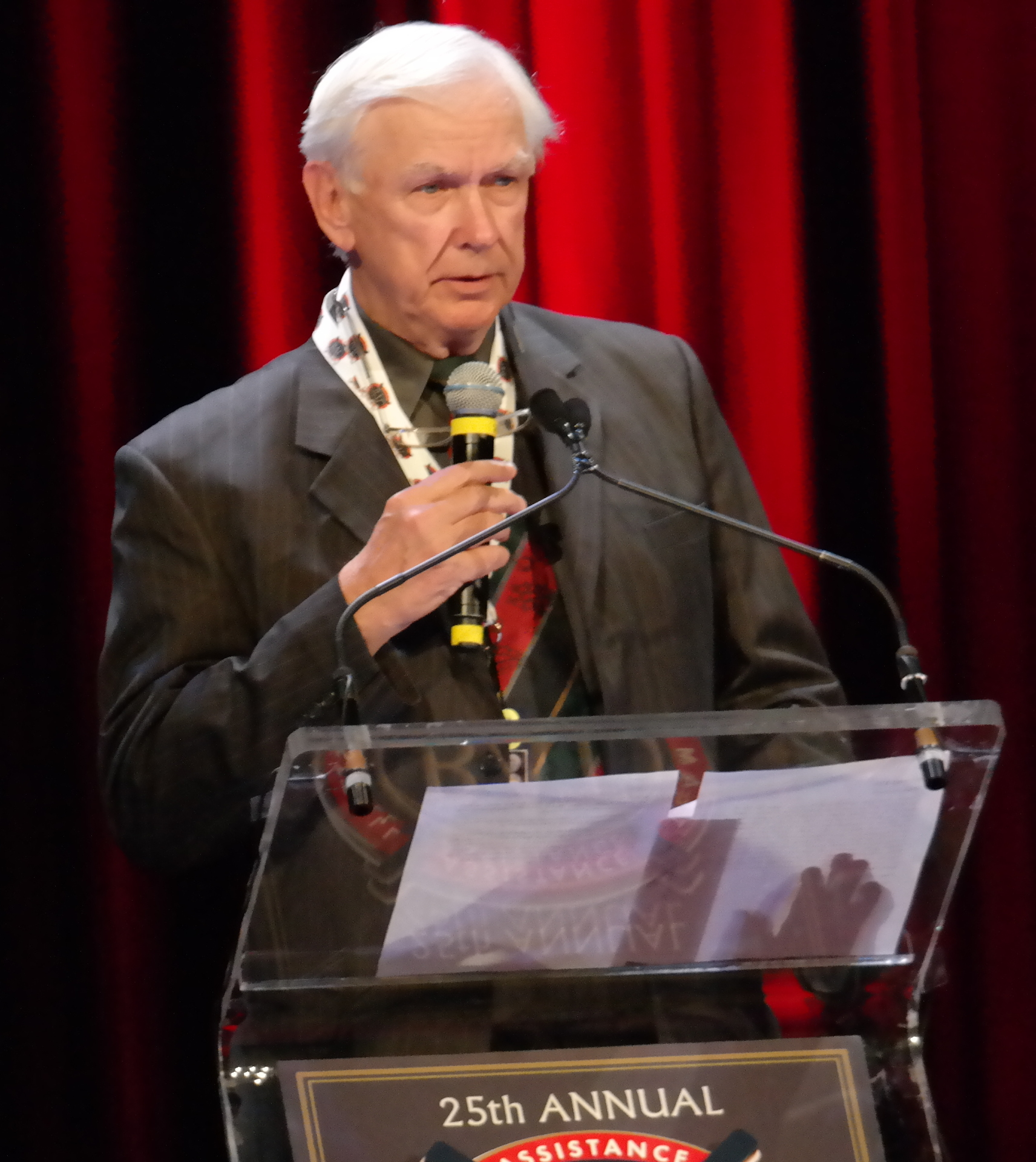
- Michael in 2014
- Shortstop / Manager
- Born: June 2, 1938; Kent, Ohio, U.S.
- Died: September 7, 2017 (aged 79); Oldsmar, Florida, U.S.
- Batted: Switch Threw: Right

MLB debut
- July 15, 1966, for the Pittsburgh Pirates

Last MLB appearance
- September 9, 1975, for the Detroit Tigers

MLB statistics
- Batting average: .229
- Home runs: 15
- Runs batted in: 226
- Managerial record: 206–200
- Winning %: .507
- Stats at Baseball Reference
- Managerial record at Baseball Reference

Teams
- As player: Pittsburgh Pirates (1966); Los Angeles Dodgers (1967); New York Yankees (1968–1974); Detroit Tigers (1975); As manager: New York Yankees (1981–1982); Chicago Cubs (1986–1987); As general manager: New York Yankees (1980–1981, 1991–1995)

Career highlights and awards
- World Series champion (1978)

Eugene Richard Michael (June 2, 1938 – September 7, 2017), known as Stick, was an American professional baseball player, coach, scout, and team executive. He appeared in 973 games in Major League Baseball, primarily as a shortstop, between 1966 and 1975, most prominently as a member of the New York Yankees, for whom he anchored their infield for seven seasons. He also played for the Pittsburgh Pirates, Los Angeles Dodgers and Detroit Tigers. He was a light hitter but also a quick and smooth defensive player.

After his playing career, Michael managed the Yankees and Chicago Cubs and served as the Yankees' general manager. As an executive, Michael is credited with rebuilding the Yankees team that became a dynasty in the late 1990s.

== Early life and education ==
Michael was born on June 2, 1938, in Kent, Ohio. After graduating from Akron East High School in Akron, Ohio, he attended Kent State University. where he played college baseball and college basketball for the Kent State Golden Flashes.

He spent one season (1966–1967) playing professional basketball for the Columbus Comets of the North American Basketball League.

== Playing career ==
Although he was listed as 6 feet 3 inches (1.91 m) tall and 183 pounds (83 kg), Michael was given the nickname "Stick" because of his slender frame. After signing with the Pittsburgh Pirates in 1959, the switch-hitter made his major league debut with the Pirates in 1966 as a backup shortstop to Gene Alley.

That December, the Pirates traded Michael to the Los Angeles Dodgers with third baseman Bob Bailey for Maury Wills. He spent one season in Los Angeles and was then purchased by the New York Yankees. He played for the Yankees from 1968 through 1974. Michael appeared in over 100 games five times over seven seasons with the Yanks, and batted a career-high .272 with 112 hits in 1969.

Upon being unconditionally released in January 1975 at age 36, he signed with the Detroit Tigers, where he spent the 1975 campaign, reunited with his longtime Yankee manager, Ralph Houk. Released again in February 1976, Michael joined the Boston Red Sox, spending spring training with them and making their early season roster as a utility infielder. However, he did not play in any regular season games for Boston, and was released in May.

He retired with a .229 batting average, 15 home runs and 226 runs batted in in 973 games played. Michael was a master of the hidden-ball trick, which he executed five times in his career.

== Post-playing career ==
Weeks after his release from Boston, Michael became a coach with the Yankees. Reggie Jackson credited Michael's scouting reports for helping him hit three home runs in Game 6 of the 1977 World Series. Michael served as manager of the Yankees' Triple-A team in 1979 and as general manager of the Yankees in 1980. In 1981, Michael became the Yankees' manager. He had managed well in Triple-A, but some veteran players believed that he had been selected because he would be more likely to follow Yankee owner George Steinbrenner's orders than had predecessor Dick Howser. At one point in the 1981 season, annoyed by Steinbrenner's constant interference, he challenged Steinbrenner to fire him, and he was fired in September. He was hired again in 1982 but was fired in August after publicly criticizing Steinbrenner's interference. As a manager, he and his coaches would keep extensive data in notebooks that they studied to help make decisions. Michael finished with a record of 92 wins and 76 losses over both stints as Yankees manager. He returned to the Yankees' front office in 1983 and again served as a coach starting in 1984. He next managed the Chicago Cubs in 1986 and 1987. His managerial record with the Cubs was 114 wins and 124 losses.

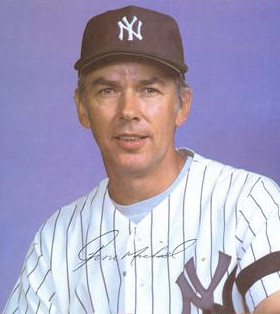
Michael in 1981

In 1990, the Yankees hired Michael for his second term as general manager. With Steinbrenner suspended from baseball operations by commissioner Fay Vincent, Michael took advantage of his managerial flexibility by rebuilding the Yankees' farm system, developing young talent rather than trading it away as the team had done in the 1980s with little success. During Michael's tenure as general manager, the Yankees signed notable players such as Mariano Rivera, Andy Pettitte, Derek Jeter and Jorge Posada (collectively known as the Core Four) and traded for Paul O'Neill. Michael also demonstrated patience with Bernie Williams, whom Steinbrenner had wanted to trade when Williams struggled early in his career.

This foundation fueled Yankees championships in 1996 and from 1998–2000. However, Michael was fired in 1995 before the Yankees dynasty began to win World Series as a result of fallout from the 1994 strike, which had ended the Yankees' chance to complete the season with the best record in the American League. It was the second time that the Yankees had fired Michael as a result of a strike, as he had been fired after the team slumped following the 1981 strike.

From 1996 until 2002, Michael served as vice president of major-league scouting for the Yankees. In 2002, the Red Sox tried to approach Michael about their general manager position, but the Yankees did not grant permission. In 2003, Michael was promoted to vice-president and senior advisor, a position that he held until his death.

During his time as vice president, Michael was a regular attendee at the annual Old-Timers' Day festivities, serving as the manager for both the Bombers and the Clippers teams in the exhibition game.

== Managerial record ==
Team	Year	Regular season					Postseason			
Team	Year	Games	Won	Lost	Win %	Finish	Won	Lost	Win %	Result
NYY	1981	56	34	22	.607	1st in AL East	–	–	–	–
NYY	1981	26	14	12	.538	fired	–	–	–	–
NYY	1982	86	44	42	.512	fired	–	–	–	–
NYY total		168	92	76	.548		0	0	–	
CHC	1986	102	46	56	.451	5th in NL East	–	–	–	–
CHC	1987	136	68	68	.500	resigned	–	–	–	–
CHC total		238	114	124	.479		0	0	–	
Total		406	206	200	.507		0	0	–	

== Personal life ==
During his tenure with the Yankees, Michael had been a resident of Norwood, New Jersey and had four children. He married twice, with his first marriage to Rae Reuter ending in divorce.

Michael died following a heart attack on September 7, 2017 in Oldsmar, Florida at age 79. His survivors included his second wife and four children. To honor Michael, the Yankees wore black armbands on their uniforms for the remainder of the 2017 season.
