= Bill White (first baseman) =

American baseball player (born 1934)

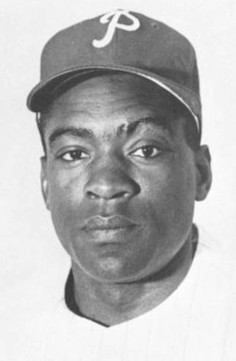
- First baseman
- Born: January 28, 1934 (age 92); Lakewood, Florida, U.S.
- Batted: Left Threw: Left

MLB debut
- May 7, 1956, for the New York Giants

Last MLB appearance
- September 24, 1969, for the St. Louis Cardinals

MLB statistics
- Batting average: .286
- Home runs: 202
- Runs batted in: 870
- Stats at Baseball Reference

Teams
- New York / San Francisco Giants (1956, 1958); St. Louis Cardinals (1959–1965); Philadelphia Phillies (1966–1968); St. Louis Cardinals (1969)

Career highlights and awards
- 8× All-Star (1959–1961², 1963, 1964); World Series champion (1964); 7× Gold Glove Award (1960–1966); St. Louis Cardinals Hall of Fame

William DeKova White (born January 28, 1934) is an American former professional baseball first baseman. He played 13 seasons in Major League Baseball (MLB) for the New York / San Francisco Giants, St. Louis Cardinals, and Philadelphia Phillies. He was an eight-time All-Star and seven-time Gold Glove winner who earned a championship as a top contributor in the 1964 World Series.

White became a full-time sportscaster after his playing career ended in 1969 and was the play-by-play man and color analyst for New York Yankees television and radio broadcasts for 18 years.

In 1989, White was elected President of the National League to replace Bart Giamatti, who succeeded Peter Ueberroth as Commissioner. White served as NL president until he retired in 1994.

== Early life and education ==
White was born on January 28, 1934, in Lakewood, Florida. When White was 3, his mother and grandmother moved to Warren, Ohio, where they lived in a segregated housing project. White's mother worked to support the family, and he was raised by his grandmother.

White graduated from Warren G. Harding High School in Warren, Ohio in 1952, and was both president and salutatorian of his class. Because White was African American, Harding's principal ended the school tradition of the class president dancing with the prom queen (who was white that year).

He then stayed in-state to attend Hiram College from 1953 to 1955. He chose the school because of its pre-med program. In both high school and college, White lettered in baseball, basketball, and football.

== Playing career ==
White was scouted by the New York Giants while playing in a tournament for Hiram College. He tried out for Giants manager Leo Durocher. The Giants offered White $1,000 to sign with them. He wanted more so he could pay for college. After the Giants raised the offer to $2,500 he signed with the Giants, on the condition that he could complete college. He put his plans for becoming a doctor on hold while he pursued baseball, to see if he could make it into major league baseball in 3–4 years. While he returned to college each year after playing minor league baseball, in 1955 his focus turned completely to baseball, and White did not finish college.

=== Minor league ===
In 1953, at age 19, White was assigned to the Danville Leafs (Virginia) of the Class B Carolina League. As a minor-leaguer, White was the second black American to play for a Carolina League team, and was the only black player on his team. Percy Miller Jr. broke the color barrier for that league in 1951. White had an excellent year, with a .298 batting average, 20 home runs, 99 runs scored, 84 runs batted in (RBI), and 21 stolen bases. However, the league's fans subjected White to a level of racial abuse and invective than he had never experienced before, and he called it the worst year of his life. On one occasion, his teammates had to protect him "behind a shield of bats" from a rock-throwing crowd in Burlington, North Carolina.

White played Single-A ball in 1954, batting .319, with 30 home runs, 120 runs scored, 92 RBIs, 40 stolen bases, and a .967 on base plus slugging percentage (OPS). At Double-A in 1955, for the Dallas Eagles of the Texas League, he hit .295, with 22 home runs, 88 runs scored, 93 RBIs, 18 stolen bases, and a .862 OPS. In 1956, he played 20 games for the Minneapolis Millers of the Triple-A American Association, when he was called up to the Giants.

=== Major league ===
In his 13-season major league career, White batted .286 with 202 home runs and 870 RBIs in 1,673 games.

==== New York Giants/San Francisco Giants ====
In White's first game with the Giants on May 7, 1956, he hit a home run in his first major league at bat in the second inning. White played 138 games that year as the Giants first baseman, hitting .256 with 22 home runs. He did not play in 1957, due to military service. White rejoined the team in July 1958, after the Giants had moved to San Francisco, playing in only 26 games. If he stayed with the Giants, White would have to compete for the first base job with future Hall of Fame player Orlando Cepeda, the 1958 Rookie of the Year, and up and coming future Hall of Fame first baseman Willie McCovey. On March 25, 1959, White was traded with Ray Jablonski to St. Louis Cardinals for Sam Jones and Don Choate.

==== St. Louis Cardinals ====
1969 photocard of White for St. Louis Cardinals

White played for the Cardinals from 1959 through 1965, never hitting below .283, and surpassing .300 four times. He made the National League (NL) All-Star team every one of those years except 1962. However, in 1962, he had his highest career batting average (.324), his career-high OPS (.868), along with 93 runs scored, and 102 RBIs. He also won a Gold Glove at first base that year, and was 13th in NL Most Valuable Player (MVP) voting.

His best statistical year came in 1963 when he posted career highs with 200 hits, 106 runs scored, 27 home runs, and 109 RBIs. White was a consistent performer, particularly during the 1962-64 seasons. During those three seasons, he had highly productive and notably consistent numbers for hits (199, 200, 191), runs (93, 106, 92), home runs (20, 27, 21), runs batted in (102, 109, 102), and average (.324, .304, .303). During the 1964 Cardinals championship season, White placed third in the league MVP voting for his overall seasonal performance. He had a subpar postseason, batting only .111 (3–27 with 2 RBIs) in the World Series.

A capable baserunner, White stole 12 or more bases four times. He was also one of the top defensive first basemen of his time, winning seven straight Gold Glove Awards (1960–66). White hit for the cycle on August 14, 1960, and once hit three home runs in a game, on July 5, 1961 against the Dodgers at Dodger Stadium. Also in July 1961, White tied Ty Cobb's 49-year Major League record by collecting 14 hits in consecutive doubleheaders, both against the Chicago Cubs at Sportsman's Park, going 4-for-5 in both games on July 17 and 3-for-4 in both games the very next day. Coincidentally, the first doubleheader was played on the same day Cobb died and 49 years to the day after Cobb collected eight hits to begin his feat.

==== Philadelphia Phillies ====
On October 27, 1965, the Cardinals traded White, Dick Groat and Bob Uecker to Philadelphia Phillies for Pat Corrales, Art Mahaffey and Alex Johnson. In 1966, White hit .276, with 22 home runs, 85 runs scored and 103 RBIs in 159 games, and was 23rd in MVP voting. Those numbers steadily declined in the following two seasons, after tearing his Achilles Tendon in the 1966 off-season. The Phillies traded White back to the Cardinals for Jim Hutto and Jerry Buchek in April 1969, his final season. He played sparingly in only 49 games.

== Broadcasting career ==
White earned a sports program on KMOX radio in St. Louis while he was still playing for the Cardinals, after being chided by Harry Caray, then the Cardinals' lead announcer, to try out. Following his trade to the Phillies in 1966, a meeting with executive producer Lew Klein of WFIL-TV (now WPVI-TV) led to White hosting a pre-game show for the station's broadcasts of Phillies games. During the off-season, White appeared on the station's newscasts as a sports reporter. After retiring, White joined WFIL-TV's news department full-time as it first sports director and anchor. While in Philadelphia, White became the first African-American to broadcast NHL games when he called several games of the Philadelphia Flyers.

In 1971, White joined the New York Yankees' broadcast team. He called Yankee games from 1971 to 1988, most often teamed with Phil Rizzuto and Frank Messer. White did the team's broadcasts on both radio and television during most of that stretch. White was the first regular black play-by-play announcer for a major-league sports team.

On New York City radio, White was featured on WMCA from 1971 to 1977, after which the Yankees switched over to WINS. In 1981, the Yankee broadcast team moved over to WABC. The five Championship Series and one Division Series that the Yankees played in during that time were broadcast on the Yankee radio network in addition to the national broadcast.

Nationally, White helped call several World Series for CBS Radio (1976, 1977, 1978, 1987, and 1988) and did sports reports for the network. In the 1988 World Series, working on CBS radio alongside Jack Buck, White participated in Buck's historic call of the game-winning home run hit by Kirk Gibson in Game 1. After Buck's exclamation of "Is this really happening, Bill?", White responded with "It is happening! And they've got to help him home!" White worked as a Monday Night Baseball announcer for ABC television in the late 1970s. He also did pre-game reports for ABC's coverage of the Yankee Stadium games in the 1977 World Series, and handled the post-game trophy presentation for the network after the Yankees clinched the world title in the sixth game.

In addition to regular-season broadcasts, WPIX produced local broadcasts of the American League Championship Series in 1976, 1977, 1978, 1980 and 1981, as well as the 1978 American League East tie-breaker game and the 1981 American League Division Series. White did the play-by-play for Bucky Dent's three-run home run during the 1978 one-game playoff between the Yankees and Boston Red Sox in 1978 for WPIX.

Outside of baseball, White was also part of the coverage of the Winter Olympic Games in 1980 and 1984. He also broadcast college basketball games of the Philadelphia Big 5 in the mid to late 1970's.

== National League president and Hall of Fame ==
White was elected to replace Giamatti as National League president in 1989 in a unanimous vote, becoming the first black executive to hold such a high position in sports. He served as NL president through 1994. In his autobiography, he later expressed the concern that he had about having been more of a figurehead while NL president, but he also said that he managed to accomplish some of the goals that he originally had when he took the job.

For several years, beginning just after his retirement from the NL, White was a member of the Veterans Committee of the Baseball Hall of Fame. White was important in the selection of former Yankees' shortstop Phil Rizzuto to the Hall of Fame. White, along with fellow newcomers to the committee Yogi Berra (a longtime Rizzuto teammate), and Rizzuto's top rival and stand-out shortstop for the perennial pennant-winning NL Brooklyn Dodgers, Pee Wee Reese, were noted for having helped swing the vote in favor of the Yankee shortstop's candidacy during their first year on the committee. White remained a member of the Veterans Committee through 2001.

== Honors ==
The New York Yankees organization showed their appreciation following his years in the broadcast booth when they selected White to receive their Pride of the Yankees Award in 1990.

On May 22, 2020, White was elected to the St. Louis Cardinals Hall of Fame along with Tom Herr and John Tudor.

On March 9, 2026, White was announced as the recipient of the 2026 Buck O'Neil Lifetime Achievement Award from the National Baseball Hall of Fame. The award recognizes White "for extraordinary efforts to enhance baseball’s positive impact on society". He formally accepted the award on July 25, 2026.

== Personal life ==
Before White was inducted into the US Army, he married his high school sweetheart, Mildred Hightower, on November 20, 1956. They would have five children before they divorced in the 1980s. White currently resides in Upper Black Eddy, Pennsylvania.

In 2011, White released his autobiography entitled Uppity: My Untold Story About the Games People Play.

== See also ==
- List of Major League Baseball players with a home run in their first major league at bat
- List of Major League Baseball players to hit for the cycle

Achievements
Preceded by Brooks Robinson	Hitting for the cycle August 14, 1960	Succeeded by Ken Boyer
Media offices
Preceded by Sparky Anderson	World Series national radio color commentator 1987–1988	Succeeded by Johnny Bench
