= 1976 New York Yankees season =

Season for the Major League Baseball team the New York Yankees

1976 New York Yankees
- American League Champion; American League East Division Champion
- League: American League
- Division: East
- Ballpark: Yankee Stadium
- City: New York City
- Record: 97–62 (.610)
- Owners: George Steinbrenner
- General managers: Gabe Paul
- Managers: Billy Martin
- Television: WPIX (Phil Rizzuto, Frank Messer, Bill White)
- Radio: WMCA (Frank Messer, Phil Rizzuto, Bill White and Spencer Ross)

The 1976 New York Yankees season was the 74th season for the franchise. The team posted a 97–62 (.610) record in the regular season, 10½ games ahead of the runner-up Baltimore Orioles, to win their first American League East Division title.

In the ALCS, the Yankees defeated the Kansas City Royals in 5 games. Chris Chambliss's walk-off home run in Game 5 clinched the pennant for the Yankees, their first in a dozen years.

In the World Series, they were defeated in a four-game sweep by the defending champion Cincinnati Reds, marking only the second time that the Yankees were swept in a World Series (1963).

New York was managed by Billy Martin; after two seasons sharing Shea Stadium in Queens with the Mets, they returned to the newly renovated Yankee Stadium in The Bronx.

== Offseason ==
The Yankees returned to their home stadium in The Bronx after a two-year absence. The team had played home games at Shea Stadium in Queens, the home of the New York Mets, while renovations to Yankee Stadium were completed.

The 1975 club had finished in third place in the AL East with a record of 83–77, finishing 12 games behind the division winning Boston Red Sox. The club was beginning their first full season under manager Billy Martin, who had been hired following the mid-season firing of Bill Virdon.

Owner George Steinbrenner made three off-season moves to try to help the club. First, they brought in power-hitting outfielder/DH Oscar Gamble, who would find the 'short porch' in right field very inviting for his power swing. Then the club made two deals on the same day: they sent Doc Medich to Pittsburgh for three players, primarily seeking the services of pitcher Dock Ellis; and shipping outfielder Bobby Bonds to California for leadoff man Mickey Rivers and starter Ed Figueroa. The Pirates trade had the longest lasting impact, as then-unheralded minor leaguer Willie Randolph was included in the deal, and was a major catalyst on championship teams for years to come.

=== Notable transactions ===
- November 22, 1975: Pat Dobson was traded by the Yankees to the Cleveland Indians for Oscar Gamble.
- December 11, 1975: Doc Medich was traded by the Yankees to the Pittsburgh Pirates for Dock Ellis, Ken Brett and Willie Randolph.
- December 11, 1975: Bobby Bonds was traded by the Yankees to the California Angels for Mickey Rivers and Ed Figueroa.
- January 27, 1976: Walt Williams was released by the Yankees.
- March 29, 1976: Ed Brinkman was released by the Yankees.

== Regular season ==
=== Season standings ===
AL East
Team	W	L	Pct.	GB	Home	Road
New York Yankees	97	62	.610	—	45‍–‍35	52‍–‍27
Baltimore Orioles	88	74	.543	10½	42‍–‍39	46‍–‍35
Boston Red Sox	83	79	.512	15½	46‍–‍35	37‍–‍44
Cleveland Indians	81	78	.509	16	44‍–‍35	37‍–‍43
Detroit Tigers	74	87	.460	24	36‍–‍44	38‍–‍43
Milwaukee Brewers	66	95	.410	32	36‍–‍45	30‍–‍50

=== Record vs. opponents ===
1976 American League record Sources:
Team	BAL	BOS	CAL	CWS	CLE	DET	KC	MIL	MIN	NYY	OAK	TEX
Baltimore	—	7–11	8–4	8–4	7–11	12–6	6–6	11–7	4–8	13–5	4–8	8–4
Boston	11–7	—	7–5	6–6	9–9	14–4	3–9	12–6	7–5	7–11	4–8	3–9
California	4–8	5–7	—	11–7	7–5	6–6	8–10	4–8	8–10	5–7	6–12	12–6
Chicago	4–8	6–6	7–11	—	3–9	6–6	8–10	7–5	7–11	1–11	8–9	7–11
Cleveland	11–7	9–9	5–7	9–3	—	6–12	6–6	11–6	9–3	4–12	4–8	7–5
Detroit	6–12	4–14	6–6	6–6	12–6	—	4–8	12–6	4–8	9–8	6–6	5–7
Kansas City	6–6	9–3	10–8	10–8	6–6	8–4	—	8–4	10–8	7–5	9–9	7–11
Milwaukee	7–11	6–12	8–4	5–7	6–11	6–12	4–8	—	4–8	5–13	5–7	10–2
Minnesota	8–4	5–7	10–8	11–7	3–9	8–4	8–10	8–4	—	2–10	11–7	11–7
New York	5–13	11–7	7–5	11–1	12–4	8–9	5–7	13–5	10–2	—	6–6	9–3
Oakland	8–4	8–4	12–6	9–8	8–4	6–6	9–9	7–5	7–11	6–6	—	7–11
Texas	4–8	9–3	6–12	11–7	5–7	7–5	11–7	2–10	7–11	3–9	11–7	—

=== Season summary ===
The Yankees won 97 games in 1976 and captured the Eastern Division title of the American League, marking their first postseason appearance since 1964. Two monumental things happened as the season opened. First, the club returned to Yankee Stadium to play home games, with a special pre-game ceremony for the April 15 home opener that included Joe DiMaggio, Mickey Mantle, Whitey Ford, Don Larsen, and the widows of Babe Ruth and Lou Gehrig. Eighty-five-year-old Bob Shawkey, who had pitched in the stadium in its opening season of 1923, threw out the first pitch, and the Bronx Bombers defeated Minnesota 11–4. Second, the team announced that Thurman Munson would serve in the role of team captain. This was significant because no Yankee player had been captain since the death of Gehrig in 1941.

The team started fast with a 10–3 record in April, including a 5–1 West Coast swing through California and Oakland. On May 20, they authored another memorable chapter in their on-going rivalry with the Boston Red Sox. Lou Piniella collided with Carlton Fisk at home plate, igniting a huge bench-clearing brawl during which Graig Nettles injured Bill Lee's pitching arm.

By mid-June, the club had built a 7-game lead. On the June 15 trading deadline, they made two significant moves to secure post-season success. First, they completed a 10-player deal with Baltimore, upgrading the pitching staff by acquiring starters Ken Holtzman and Doyle Alexander. Second, they were sold the rights to all-star pitcher Vida Blue from Oakland for $1.5 million. However, Commissioner Bowie Kuhn, invoking the "best interests in baseball clause", invalidated the sale of Blue, returning him to Oakland.

In July, six players represented the team in the All-Star Game in Philadelphia: Thurman Munson, who was elected to start by the fans; Chris Chambliss; Catfish Hunter; Willie Randolph; Mickey Rivers; and Sparky Lyle. By the end of the month, their lead in the division ballooned to 14½ games. In August, they continued to cruise towards the division title, and took part in a marathon 19-inning affair with Minnesota. By September, the club was poised to secure the spot in the American League Championship Series, and did so on September 25 by defeating the Detroit Tigers 10–6 to clinch the division title.

=== Monument Park ===
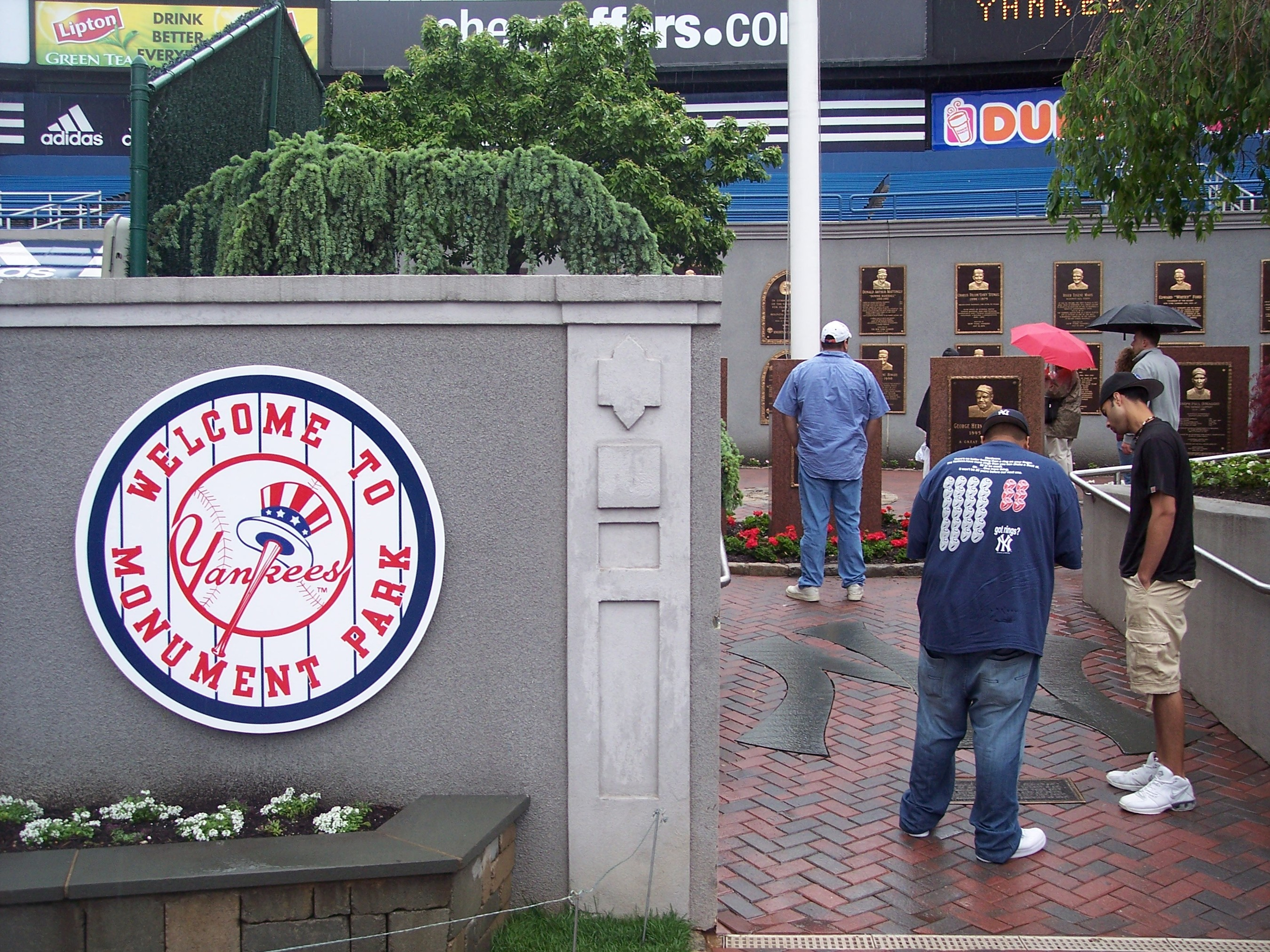
The entrance to the monuments and plaques, at the end of the retired numbers display.

The Yankees opened "Monument Park" at the stadium in 1976. The origin of Monument Park is dated back to May 30, 1932, when the Yankees dedicated a monument to former manager Miller Huggins. The monument was placed it in front of the flagpole in center field at Yankee Stadium. Huggins was the first of many Yankees players granted this honor.

=== Postseason ===
The Yankees ended the season with a 97–62 record, best in the American League and third best overall in all of major league baseball. In the ALCS, they beat the Kansas City Royals in 5 games. In Game 5, Chris Chambliss hit a memorable walk off home run to clinch the pennant for the Yankees, sending them to the World Series for the first time since 1964. The most memorable moment about the home run was the fans coming onto the field and mobbing Chambliss, and in the process, stealing bases to keep as souvenirs. A rule was later put into place to prevent fans from coming onto the field of play during a home run, dubbed the Chris Chambliss rule. Like their arch-rivals the Red Sox did in the 1975 World Series, the Yankees lost the World Series to the dominant Cincinnati Reds. However, this World Series was much more lopsided than the previous one, as the Yankees were swept, 4 games to 0, by the Reds and were outscored 22–8 in the process.

=== Aftermath ===
The 1976 Yankees saw the team restore the franchise to glory following the mismanaged years when CBS owned the club and failed to finish in the top half of the league or division from 1965 through 1972. Owner George Steinbrenner delivered on his promise to return the Yankees to greatness, and the fans responded as attendance reached over 2 million for the first time since 1950. Munson won the American League MVP, hitting .302 with 105 RBI. Munson became the first, and until Aaron Judge in 2022, only Yankee player ever to win the MVP and the Rookie of the Year award while wearing the Yankees uniform.

However, the loss to Cincinnati in the World Series only consumed Steinbrenner to try to further improve the ball club. Thanks to the Seitz decision which made the reserve clause obsolete, Steinbrenner took advantage of the new era of free agency. In an era where other owners such as Charlie Finley were unwilling to spend money to keep players, and other clubs were still run by families not ready for the 'balance sheet' era of sports ownership, Steinbrenner ushered in the big salary era of sports by signing Reggie Jackson to a five-year contract worth just under $3 million. The idea of bringing in Jackson for 1977 would be to try to put the Yankees over the top.

Still, the 1976 version of the Yankees marked a return of prominence to the organization. It marked the first of three consecutive American League titles, and a stretch of six seasons where the club won five division titles, four league championships, and two World Series titles.

=== Notable transactions ===
- May 16, 1976: Larry Gura was traded by the Yankees to the Kansas City Royals for Fran Healy.
- May 18, 1976: Ken Brett and Rich Coggins were traded by the Yankees to the Chicago White Sox for Carlos May.
- June 8, 1976: Pat Tabler was drafted by the New York Yankees in the 1st round (16th pick) of the 1976 Major League Baseball draft.
- June 15, 1976: Rudy May, Tippy Martinez, Dave Pagan, Scott McGregor, and Rick Dempsey were traded by the Yankees to the Baltimore Orioles for Ken Holtzman, Doyle Alexander, Grant Jackson, Ellie Hendricks, and Jimmy Freeman.
- July 10, 1976: The Yankees obtained Gene Locklear from the San Diego Padres for a player to be named later. The Yankees completed the deal by sending Rick Sawyer to the Padres on July 31.
- August 1, 1976: Jim York was released by the Yankees.
- August 31, 1976: Rafael Santana was signed as an amateur free agent by the Yankees.
- September 1, 1976: César Tovar was signed as a free agent by the Yankees.

=== Roster ===
1976 New York Yankees
Roster
Pitchers: 52 Doyle Alexander; 38 Ken Brett; 36 Dock Ellis; 31 Ed Figueroa; 49 Ron Guidry; 53 Ken Holtzman; 29 Catfish Hunter; 25 Grant Jackson; 28 Sparky Lyle; 18,40 Tippy Martinez; 43 Rudy May; 53 Dave Pagan; 19 Dick Tidrow; 43 Jim York	Catchers: 46 Rick Dempsey; 40 Fran Healy; 18 Elrod Hendricks; 15 Thurman Munson; Infielders: 2 Sandy Alomar Sr.; 10 Chris Chambliss; 20 Mickey Klutts; 22 Jim Mason; 9 Graig Nettles; 30 Willie Randolph; 11 Fred Stanley; 26 César Tovar	Outfielders: 26 Juan Bernhardt; 26 Rich Coggins; 47 Kerry Dineen; 23 Oscar Gamble; 46 Gene Locklear; 27 Elliott Maddox; 38 Carlos May; 47 Larry Murray; 14 Lou Piniella; 17 Mickey Rivers; 24 Otto Vélez; 6 Roy White; 44 Terry Whitfield; Other batters: 12 Ron Blomberg	Manager: 1 Billy Martin; Coaches: 8 Yogi Berra; 32 Elston Howard; 34 Dick Howser; 21 Bob Lemon; 39 Gene Michael

== Player stats ==
= Indicates team leader

= Indicates league leader

=== Batting ===
==== Starters by position ====
Note: Pos = Position; G = Games played; AB = At bats; H = Hits; Avg. = Batting average; HR = Home runs; RBI = Runs batted in

Pos	Player	G	AB	H	Avg.	HR	RBI
C	Thurman Munson	152	616	186	.302	17	105
1B	Chris Chambliss	156	641	188	.293	17	96
2B	Willie Randolph	125	430	115	.267	1	40
3B	Graig Nettles	158	583	148	.254	32	93
SS	Fred Stanley	110	260	62	.238	1	20
LF	Roy White	156	626	179	.286	14	65
CF	Mickey Rivers	137	590	184	.312	8	67
RF	Oscar Gamble	110	340	79	.232	17	57
DH	Carlos May	87	288	80	.278	3	40

==== Other batters ====
Note: G = Games played; AB = At bats; H = Hits; Avg. = Batting average; HR = Home runs; RBI = Runs batted in

Player	G	AB	H	Avg.	HR	RBI
Lou Piniella	100	327	92	.281	3	38
Jim Mason	93	217	39	.180	1	14
Sandy Alomar Sr.	67	163	39	.239	1	10
Fran Healy	46	120	32	.267	0	9
Otto Vélez	49	94	25	.266	2	10
Elrod Hendricks	26	53	12	.226	3	5
Elliott Maddox	18	46	10	.217	0	3
Rick Dempsey	21	42	5	.119	0	2
César Tovar	13	39	6	.154	0	2
Gene Locklear	13	32	7	.219	0	1
Juan Bernhardt	10	21	4	.190	0	1
Larry Murray	8	10	1	.100	0	2
Kerry Dineen	4	7	2	.286	0	1
Rich Coggins	7	4	1	.250	0	1
Mickey Klutts	2	3	0	.000	0	0
Ron Blomberg	1	2	0	.000	0	0
Terry Whitfield	1	0	0	----	0	0

=== Pitching ===
==== Starting pitchers ====
Note: G = Games pitched; IP = Innings pitched; W = Wins; L = Losses; ERA = Earned run average; SO = Strikeouts

Player	G	IP	W	L	ERA	SO
Catfish Hunter	36	298.2	17	15	3.53	173
Ed Figueroa	34	256.2	19	10	3.02	119
Dock Ellis	32	211.2	17	8	3.19	65
Ken Holtzman	21	149.0	9	7	4.17	41
Doyle Alexander	19	136.2	10	5	3.29	41
Rudy May	11	68.0	4	3	3.57	38

==== Other pitchers ====
Note: G = Games pitched; IP = Innings pitched; W = Wins; L = Losses; ERA = Earned run average; SO = Strikeouts

Player	G	IP	W	L	ERA	SO
Dave Pagan	7	23.2	1	1	2.28	13

==== Relief pitchers ====
Note: G = Games pitched; IP = Innings pitched; W = Wins; L = Losses; SV = Saves; ERA = Earned run average; SO = Strikeouts

Player	G	IP	W	L	SV	ERA	SO
Sparky Lyle	64	103.2	7	8	23	2.26	61
Dick Tidrow	47	92.1	4	5	10	2.63	65
Grant Jackson	21	58.2	6	0	1	1.69	25
Tippy Martinez	11	28.0	2	0	2	1.93	14
Ron Guidry	7	16.0	0	0	0	5.63	12
Jim York	3	9.2	1	0	1	5.59	6
Ken Brett	2	2.1	0	0	1	0.00	1

== Postseason ==
=== ALCS ===
After splitting the first two games with the Western Division champion Royals in Kansas City, the Yankees returned home to try to capture the pennant. The two clubs split the next two games as well, setting up a deciding Game Five showdown. The Yankees had a 6–3 lead after seven innings, but the Royals rallied for 3 runs in the top of the 8th to tie the game at 6–6. Then in the bottom of the ninth, Chris Chambliss hit the first pitch thrown by Mark Littell over the right field wall for the game-winning walk-off home run. Of course, it was anything but a walk-off, as fans stormed the field with delight, making it nearly impossible for Chambliss to round the bases. The win put the Bombers into the World Series for the first time since 1964.

=== Game 1 ===
October 9, 1976, at Royals Stadium

Team	1	2	3	4	5	6	7	8	9	R	H	E
New York	2	0	0	0	0	0	0	0	2	4	12	0
Kansas City	0	0	0	0	0	0	0	1	0	1	5	2
W: Catfish Hunter (1–0) L: Larry Gura (0–1)
HR: None

=== Game 2 ===
October 10, 1976, at Royals Stadium

Team	1	2	3	4	5	6	7	8	9	R	H	E
New York	0	1	2	0	0	0	0	0	0	3	12	5
Kansas City	2	0	0	0	0	2	0	3	0	7	9	0
W: Paul Splittorff (1–0) L: Ed Figueroa (0–1)
HR: None

=== Game 3 ===
October 12, 1976, at Yankee Stadium

Team	1	2	3	4	5	6	7	8	9	R	H	E
Kansas City	3	0	0	0	0	0	0	0	0	3	6	0
New York	0	0	0	2	0	3	0	0	X	5	9	0
W: Dock Ellis (1–0) L: Andy Hassler (0–1) S: Sparky Lyle (1)
HR: NYY: – Chris Chambliss (1)

=== Game 4 ===
October 13, 1976, at Yankee Stadium

Team	1	2	3	4	5	6	7	8	9	R	H	E
Kansas City	0	3	0	2	0	1	0	1	0	7	9	1
New York	0	2	0	0	0	0	1	0	1	4	11	0
W: Doug Bird (1–0) L: Catfish Hunter (1–1) S: Steve Mingori (1)
HR: NYY: – Graig Nettles 2 (2)

=== Game 5 ===
October 14, 1976, at Yankee Stadium

Team	1	2	3	4	5	6	7	8	9	R	H	E
Kansas City	2	1	0	0	0	0	0	3	0	6	11	1
New York	2	0	2	0	0	2	0	0	1	7	11	1
W: Dick Tidrow (1–0) L: Mark Littell (0–1)
HR: KCR: – John Mayberry (1), George Brett (1) NYY: – Chris Chambliss (2)

=== World Series ===
The Yankees were confident heading into the Fall Classic, but proved to be little match for their opponents. The Cincinnati Reds were the defending world champions, and were making their fourth World Series appearance over a seven-year span. The Big Red Machine dominated the series, sweeping the Yankees in four straight games.

NL Cincinnati Reds (4) vs. AL New York Yankees (0)
Game	Road	Home	Score	Date	Location	Attendance	Time of Game
1	Yankees	Reds	5–1	October 16	Riverfront Stadium	54,826	2:10
2	Yankees	Reds	4–3	October 17	Riverfront Stadium	54,816	2:33
3	Reds	Yankees	6–2	October 19	Yankee Stadium	56,667	2:40
4	Reds	Yankees	7–2	October 21	Yankee Stadium	56,700	2:36

== Awards and honors ==
Team captain Thurman Munson won the AL MVP.

Graig Nettles was the AL home run champion with 32 home runs in the season.

Munson, Chris Chambliss, Catfish Hunter, Sparky Lyle, Willie Randolph and Mickey Rivers all represented the Yankees at the 1976 Major League Baseball All-Star Game.

- Billy Martin, Associated Press AL Manager of the Year

== Farm system ==
Level	Team	League	Manager
AAA	Syracuse Chiefs	International League	Bobby Cox
AA	West Haven Yankees	Eastern League	Pete Ward
A	Fort Lauderdale Yankees	Florida State League	Mike Ferraro
A-Short Season	Oneonta Yankees	New York–Penn League	Ed Napoleon

LEAGUE CHAMPIONS: Syracuse, West Haven
