= 1976 Kansas City Royals season =

1976 Kansas City Royals
- American League West champions
- League: American League
- Division: West
- Ballpark: Royals Stadium
- City: Kansas City, Missouri
- Record: 90–72 (.556)
- Divisional place: 1st
- Owners: Ewing Kauffman
- General managers: Joe Burke
- Managers: Whitey Herzog (first full season)
- Television: KBMA–TV 41 (Denny Matthews, Fred White)
- Radio: WIBW–AM 580; KMBZ–AM 980 (Denny Matthews, Fred White)

The 1976 Kansas City Royals season was their eighth in Major League Baseball. The Royals won their first division title, taking the American League West with a record of 90–72 in the first full season as manager for Whitey Herzog. Kansas City was defeated 3–2 by the New York Yankees in the ALCS. George Brett (.333) became the first Royals player to win a league batting title.

== Offseason ==
- September 29, 1975: Harmon Killebrew was released by the Royals.
- November 12, 1975: Nelson Briles was traded by the Royals to the Texas Rangers for Dave Nelson.
- March 3, 1976: Roger Nelson was signed by the Royals as a free agent.

== Regular season ==
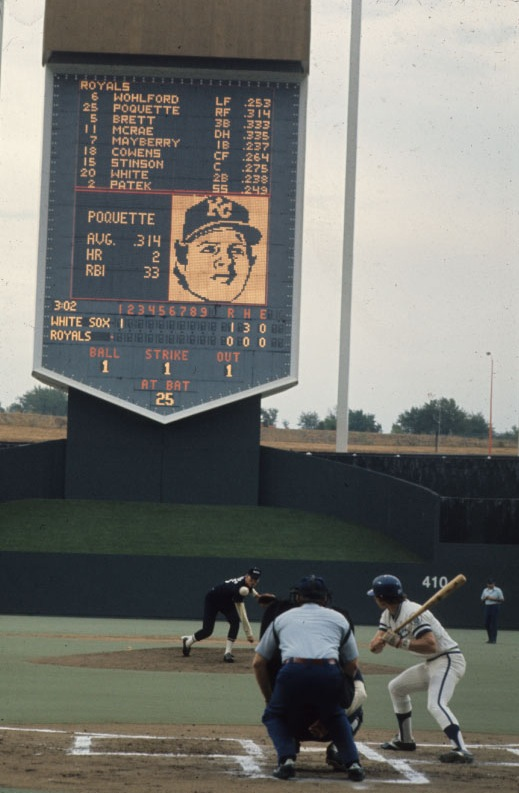
A game at Royals Stadium on Sunday, September 19, 1976. The pitcher is Chris Knapp and the batter is Tom Poquette. The Royals would beat the White Sox 6 to 5.

=== Season standings ===
AL West
Team	W	L	Pct.	GB	Home	Road
Kansas City Royals	90	72	.556	—	49‍–‍32	41‍–‍40
Oakland Athletics	87	74	.540	2½	51‍–‍30	36‍–‍44
Minnesota Twins	85	77	.525	5	44‍–‍37	41‍–‍40
Texas Rangers	76	86	.469	14	39‍–‍42	37‍–‍44
California Angels	76	86	.469	14	38‍–‍43	38‍–‍43
Chicago White Sox	64	97	.398	25½	35‍–‍45	29‍–‍52

=== Record vs. opponents ===
1976 American League record Sources:
Team	BAL	BOS	CAL	CWS	CLE	DET	KC	MIL	MIN	NYY	OAK	TEX
Baltimore	—	7–11	8–4	8–4	7–11	12–6	6–6	11–7	4–8	13–5	4–8	8–4
Boston	11–7	—	7–5	6–6	9–9	14–4	3–9	12–6	7–5	7–11	4–8	3–9
California	4–8	5–7	—	11–7	7–5	6–6	8–10	4–8	8–10	5–7	6–12	12–6
Chicago	4–8	6–6	7–11	—	3–9	6–6	8–10	7–5	7–11	1–11	8–9	7–11
Cleveland	11–7	9–9	5–7	9–3	—	6–12	6–6	11–6	9–3	4–12	4–8	7–5
Detroit	6–12	4–14	6–6	6–6	12–6	—	4–8	12–6	4–8	9–8	6–6	5–7
Kansas City	6–6	9–3	10–8	10–8	6–6	8–4	—	8–4	10–8	7–5	9–9	7–11
Milwaukee	7–11	6–12	8–4	5–7	6–11	6–12	4–8	—	4–8	5–13	5–7	10–2
Minnesota	8–4	5–7	10–8	11–7	3–9	8–4	8–10	8–4	—	2–10	11–7	11–7
New York	5–13	11–7	7–5	11–1	12–4	8–9	5–7	13–5	10–2	—	6–6	9–3
Oakland	8–4	8–4	12–6	9–8	8–4	6–6	9–9	7–5	7–11	6–6	—	7–11
Texas	4–8	9–3	6–12	11–7	5–7	7–5	11–7	2–10	7–11	3–9	11–7	—

=== Opening Day lineup ===
- Dave Nelson, DH
- Amos Otis, CF
- George Brett, 3B
- John Mayberry, 1B
- Hal McRae, LF
- Al Cowens, RF
- Fran Healy, C
- Freddie Patek, SS
- Frank White, 2B

=== Notable transactions ===
- May 16, 1976: Fran Healy is traded by the Royals to the New York Yankees for Larry Gura.
- June 8, 1976: 1976 Major League Baseball draft
  - Bill Paschall was drafted by the Royals in the 3rd round.
  - Ken Phelps was drafted by the Royals in the 15th round.

=== Roster ===
1976 Kansas City Royals
Roster
Pitchers: 29 Doug Bird; 35 Tom Bruno; 40 Steve Busby; 46,49 Jerry Cram; 39 Al Fitzmorris; 37 Larry Gura; 42 Tom Hall; 16 Andy Hassler; 22 Dennis Leonard; 17 Mark Littell; 32 Bob McClure; 23 Steve Mingori; 35 Roger Nelson; 33 Marty Pattin; 37 Ray Sadecki; 28 Ken Sanders; 34 Paul Splittorff	Catchers: 16 Fran Healy; 21 Buck Martinez; 15 Bob Stinson; 12 John Wathan; Infielders: 5 George Brett; 7 John Mayberry; 3 Dave Nelson; 2 Freddie Patek; 9 Jamie Quirk; 1 Cookie Rojas; 8 Tony Solaita; 20 Frank White	Outfielders: 18 Al Cowens; 30 Ruppert Jones; 11 Hal McRae; 26 Amos Otis; 25 Tom Poquette; 19 Willie Wilson; 6 Jim Wohlford; Other batters: 29 Tommy Davis	Manager: 24 Whitey Herzog; Coaches: 14 Steve Boros; 36 Galen Cisco; 4 Chuck Hiller; 27 Charley Lau

== Game log ==
=== Regular season ===
1976 regular season game log: 90–72 (Home: 49-32; Away: 41–40)
April: 5–7 (Home: 3–4; Away: 2–3)

#	Date	Time (CT)	Opponent	Score	Win	Loss	Save	Time of Game	Attendance	Record	Box/ Streak
1	April 9	1:15 p.m. CST	@ White Sox	L 0–4	Wood (1–0)	**Splittorff** (0–1)	–	2:25	40,318	0–1	L1
—	April 11		@ White Sox	**Postponed (Cold)** (Makeup date: August 6)							
—	April 11		@ White Sox	**Postponed (Cold)** (Makeup date: September 13)							
2	April 13	7:30 p.m. CST	Angels	**W** 7–4	**Fitzmorris** (1–0)	Hassler (0–1)	**Pattin** (1)	3:05	25,516	1–1	W1
3	April 14	7:30 p.m. CST	Angels	L 6–7	Monge (1–0)	**Pattin** (0–1)	Brewer (1)	3:16	9,043	1–2	L1
4	April 15	7:30 p.m. CST	Angels	L 1–5	Ryan (1–1)	**Splittorff** (0–2)	–	2:13	7,657	1–3	L2
5	April 16	7:30 p.m. CST	Indians	**W** 5–3	**Mingori** (1–0)	Peterson (0–1)	**Pattin** (2)	2:21	12,219	2–3	W1
6	April 17	7:30 p.m. CST	Indians	**W** 5–3 (5)	**Fitzmorris** (2–0)	Eckersley (0–2)	–	1:32	9,799	3–3	W2
7	April 18	1:30 p.m. CST	Indians	L 0–6	Dobson (1–1)	**Busby** (0–1)	–	2:41	10,466	3–4	L1
8	April 20	6:30 p.m. CST	@ Brewers	L 4–5	Broberg (1–0)	**Leonard** (0–1)	Rodríguez (3)	2:46	4,902	3–5	L2
—	April 21		@ Brewers	**Postponed (Rain)** (Makeup date: April 21)							
9	April 22	6:30 p.m. CST	@ Brewers	**W** 2–1	**Bird** (1–0)	Colborn (1–1)	–	2:36	5,196	4–5	W1
10	April 23	7:00 p.m. CST	@ Yankees	**W** 3–2	**Splittorff** (1–2)	Hunter (1–3)	**Mingori** (1)	2:32	35,116	5–5	W2
11	April 24	1:15 p.m. CST	@ Yankees	L 8–9 (11)	Lyle (2–0)	**Pattin** (0–2)	—	3:53	16,034	5–6	L1
—	April 25		@ Yankees	**Postponed (Rain)** (Makeup date: July 6)							
—	April 27		Red Sox	**Postponed (Rain)** (Makeup date: July 15)							
—	April 28		Red Sox	**Postponed (Rain)** (Makeup date: July 16)							
12	April 30	7:30 p.m. CDT	Yankees	L 3–5	Hunter (2–3)	**Splittorff** (1–3)	—	2:11	11,368	5–7	L2

May: 20–10 (Home: 11–2; Away: 9–8)

#	Date	Time (CT)	Opponent	Score	Win	Loss	Save	Time of Game	Attendance	Record	Box/ Streak
13	May 1	7:30 p.m. CDT	Yankees	**W** 4–1	**Busby** (1–1)	Figueroa (1–1)	—	2:25	18,703	6–7	W1
14	May 2	1:30 p.m. CDT	Yankees	**W** 2–1 (11)	**Bird** (2–0)	Lyle (1–1)	—	3:23	13,404	7–7	W2
15	May 4	6:30 p.m. CDT	@ Red Sox	**W** 7–5	**Fitzmorris** (3–0)	Lee (0–3)	**Bird** (1)	2:47	16,274	8–7	W3
16	May 5	6:30 p.m. CDT	@ Red Sox	**W** 8–4	**Splittorff** (2–3)	Jenkins (1–4)	**Littell** (1)	2:52	17,596	9–7	W4
17	May 7	6:30 p.m. CDT	@ Orioles	L 3–4	Garland (2–0)	**Pattin** (0–3)	—	2:35	7,310	9–8	L1
18	May 8	6:30 p.m. CDT	@ Orioles	**W** 6–3	**Leonard** (1–1)	Holtzman (2–2)	**Bird** (2)	2:33	51,195	10–8	W1
19	May 9	1:00 p.m. CDT	@ Orioles	**W** 7–4	**Littell** (1–0)	Palmer (4–4)	—	2:47	7,590	11–8	W2
20	May 10	7:30 p.m. CDT	Twins	L 4–5 (10)	Burgmeier (2–0)	**Pattin** (0–4)	Luebber (2)	3:26	12,526	11–9	L1
21	May 11	7:30 p.m. CDT	Twins	**W** 6–3	**Bird** (3–0)	Luebber (0–1)	**Littell** (2)	2:33	9,652	12–9	W1
22	May 12	7:30 p.m. CDT	Twins	**W** 17–5	**Pattin** (1–4)	Decker (2–3)	—	3:04	9,601	13–9	W2
23	May 13	7:30 p.m. CDT	White Sox	**W** 13–2	**Leonard** (2–1)	B. Johnson (1–4)	–	2:39	13,657	14–9	W3
24	May 14	7:30 p.m. CDT	White Sox	**W** 7–1	**Fitzmorris** (4–0)	Vuckovich (0–1)	–	2:09	12,990	15–9	W4
25	May 15	7:30 p.m. CDT	White Sox	**W** 2–1 (12)	**Littell** (2–0)	Gossage (1–3)	–	3:00	14,693	16–9	W5
26	May 16	1:30 p.m. CDT	White Sox	L 3–4	Carroll (1–1)	**Bird** (3–1)	Hamilton (1)	2:49	28,413	16–10	L1
27	May 17	7:30 p.m. CDT	Rangers	**W** 8–7 (12)	**Hall** (1–0)	Foucault (3–1)	–	3:57	18,936	17–10	W1
28	May 18	7:30 p.m. CDT	Rangers	**W** 3–1	**Fitzmorris** (5–0)	Umbarger (3–3)	–	2:07	14,116	18–10	W2
29	May 19	7:30 p.m. CDT	Athletics	**W** 5–2	**Splittorff** (3–3)	Torrez (4–4)	**Pattin** (3)	2:49	22,483	19–10	W3
30	May 20	7:30 p.m. CDT	Athletics	**W** 8–4	**Bird** (4–1)	P. Mitchell (1–2)	**Littell** (3)	2:46	25,682	20–10	W4
31	May 21	8:00 p.m. CDT	@ Twins	**W** 5–1	**Leonard** (3–1)	Hughes (0–4)	—	2:37	8,619	21–10	W5
32	May 22	1:15 p.m. CDT	@ Twins	L 3–5	Goltz (3–2)	**Fitzmorris** (5–1)	—	2:00	6,812	21–11	L1
33	May 23	1:15 p.m. CDT	@ Twins	L 1–3	Blyleven (4–3)	**Splittorff** (3–4)	Campbell (4)	2:10	24,716	21–12	L2
34	May 24	7:30 p.m. CDT	@ Rangers	**W** 14–11	**Mingori** (1–0)	Barr (1–3)	–	3:10	12,751	22–12	W1
—	May 25		@ Rangers	**Postponed (Rain)** (Makeup date: May 26)							
35 (1)	May 26	5:00 p.m. CDT	@ Rangers	**W** 14–2	**Leonard** (4–1)	Perry (4–4)	–	2:54	–	23–12	W2
36 (2)	May 26	8:29 p.m. CDT	@ Rangers	L 4–5 (10)	Foucault (4–1)	**Pattin** (1–5)	–	3:07	16,510	23–13	L1
37	May 27	7:30 p.m. CDT	@ Rangers	L 4–6	Singer (4–1)	**Splittorff** (3–5)	Hoerner (3)	2:44	14,755	23–14	L2
38	May 28	9:30 p.m. CDT	@ Angels	**W** 3–0	**Bird** (5–1)	Ryan (3–6)	–	2:07	15,777	24–14	W1
39 (1)	May 29	7:00 p.m. CDT	@ Angels	L 2–3	Monge (2–1)	**Littell** (2–1)	–	2:26	–	24–15	L1
40 (2)	May 29	10:01 p.m. CDT	@ Angels	L 2–7	Ross (2–6)	**Fitzmorris** (5–2)	–	2:43	28,415	24–16	L2
41	May 30	3:00 p.m. CDT	@ Angels	**W** 3–2 (14)	**Mingori** (3–0)	Drago (1–4)	–	4:43	14,193	25–16	W1
42	May 31	10:00 p.m. CDT	@ Athletics	L 1–10	Torrez (6–5)	**Splittorff** (3–6)	—	2:32	31,842	25–17	L1

June: 19–10 (Home: 12–4; Away: 7–6)

#	Date	Time (CT)	Opponent	Score	Win	Loss	Save	Time of Game	Attendance	Record	Box/ Streak
43	June 1	10:00 p.m. CDT	@ Athletics	**W** 5–2	**Bird** (6–1)	Bahnsen (2–2)	**Pattin** (4)	2:29	3,860	26–17	W1
44	June 2	10:00 p.m. CDT	@ Athletics	**W** 4–3 (12)	**Littell** (3–1)	Fingers (2–5)	**Mingori** (2)	3:57	2,628	27–17	W2
45	June 4	7:30 p.m. CDT	Brewers	**W** 4–3 (10)	**Leonard** (5–1)	Slaton (7–2)	–	2:34	16,899	28–17	W3
46 (1)	June 5	5:00 p.m. CDT	Brewers	**W** 5–4	**Fitzmorris** (6–2)	Broberg (1–5)	**Littell** (4)	–	2:51	29–17	W4
47 (2)	June 5	8:26 p.m. CDT	Brewers	**W** 7–2	**Splittorff** (4–6)	Champion (0–1)	–	2:26	35,817	30–17	W5
48	June 6	1:30 p.m. CDT	Brewers	L 3–4 (14)	Augustine (1–1)	**Pattin** (1–6)	–	3:53	15,508	30–18	L1
52	June 10	7:30 p.m. CDT	Orioles	**W** 7–0	**Splittorff** (5–6)	Palmer (6–7)	—	2:28	12,210	33–19	W2
53	June 11	7:30 p.m. CDT	Orioles	**W** 4–0	**Bird** (7–1)	Cuellar (2–7)	**Littell** (6)	2:00	25,883	34–19	W3
54	June 12	1:15 p.m. CDT	Orioles	**W** 7–6	**Busby** (3–1)	Alexander (3–4)	**Pattin** (5)	2:39	19,693	35–19	W4
55	June 13	1:30 p.m. CDT	Orioles	**W** 8–4	**Leonard** (6–2)	Flanagan (0–2)	—	2:34	23,751	36–19	W5
59	June 18	6:30 p.m. CDT	@ Indians	**W** 5–3	**Leonard** (7–2)	Thomas (0–1)	–	2:42	14,170	39–20	W1
60	June 19	6:30 p.m. CDT	@ Indians	L 0–3	Dobson (8–5)	**Fitzmorris** (8–3)	Kern (3)	2:20	17,389	39–21	L1
61	June 20	1:00 p.m. CDT	@ Indians	L 8–11	Bibby (3–2)	**Littell** (3–2)	Thomas (3)	2:55	13,295	39–22	L2
62	June 21	7:30 p.m. CDT	White Sox	L 1–2 (11)	Hamilton (3–3)	**Hall** (1–1)	–	3:00	28,918	39–23	L3
63	June 22	7:30 p.m. CDT	White Sox	L 8–14	Jefferson (2–2)	**Busby** (3–2)	–	2:44	18,125	39–24	L4
64	June 23	7:30 p.m. CDT	@ Rangers	L 5–7	Foucault (6–3)	**Leonard** (7–3)	–	2:52	21,336	39–25	L5
65	June 24	7:30 p.m. CDT	@ Rangers	L 2–5	Hargan (2–2)	**Fitzmorris** (8–4)	Hoerner (5)	2:56	14,455	39–26	L6
66	June 25	7:30 p.m. CDT	Angels	**W** 6–3	**Splittorff** (7–6)	Ross (5–9)	**Littell** (7)	2:14	25,522	40–26	W1
67	June 26	7:30 p.m. CDT	Angels	**W** 3–0	**Pattin** (2–7)	Ryan (6–8)	**Mingori** (4)	2:28	30,125	41–26	W2
68	June 27	1:30 p.m. CDT	Angels	**W** 5–4 (11)	**Bird** (8–1)	Drago (1–6)	–	3:22	37,960	42–26	W3
69	June 28	8:00 p.m. CDT	@ Twins	L 3–4	Campbell (8–2)	**Littell** (3–3)	—	2:47	6,170	42–27	L1
70	June 29	8:00 p.m. CDT	@ Twins	**W** 1–0 (10)	**Fitzmorris** (9–4)	Goltz (7–6)	—	2:40	6,201	43–27	W1
71	June 30	8:00 p.m. CDT	@ Twins	**W** 4–2	**Splittorff** (8–6)	Bane (0–1)	—	2:40	7,471	44–27	W2

July: 17–12 (Home: 8–7; Away: 9–5)

#	Date	Time (CT)	Opponent	Score	Win	Loss	Save	Time of Game	Attendance	Record	Box/ Streak
72	July 1	7:30 p.m. CDT	Athletics	L 2–5	Fingers (4–5)	**Pattin** (2–8)	—	2:46	23,175	44–28	L1
73	July 2	7:30 p.m. CDT	Athletics	**W** 8–5	**Littell** (4–3)	Blue (6–7)	—	3:05	25,723	45–28	W1
74	July 3	7:30 p.m. CDT	Athletics	**W** 7–5	**Leonard** (8–3)	Todd (6–7)	**Mingori** (5)	3:03	33,586	46–28	W2
75	July 4	1:30 p.m. CDT	Athletics	L 0–6	Norris (2–2)	**Fitzmorris** (9–5)	—	2:42	24,647	46–29	L1
76	July 5	1:00 p.m. CDT	@ Yankees	**W** 2–1	**Splittorff** (9–6)	Alexander (4–5)	**Mingori** (6)	2:50	28,041	47–29	W1
77	July 6 (1)	4:30 p.m. CDT	@ Yankees	**W** 3–1	**Bird** (9–1)	Figueroa (9–6)	**Mingori** (7)	2:17	—	48–29	W2
78	July 6 (2)	7:22 p.m. CDT	@ Yankees	L 4–7	Lyle (6–5)	**Busby** (3–3)	—	2:25	35,370	48–30	L1
79	July 7	7:00 p.m. CDT	@ Yankees	**W** 2–1	**Littell** (5–3)	Hunter (10–8)	**Mingori** (8)	2:22	23,172	49–30	W1
—	July 13	7:15 p.m. CDT	47th All-Star Game in Philadelphia, PA								
83	July 15 (1)	5:00 p.m. CDT	Red Sox	**W** 12–5	**Leonard** (10–3)	Pole (4–5)	—	2:32	—	52–31	W1
84	July 15 (2)	8:07 p.m. CDT	Red Sox	L 1–2	Jones (3–0)	**Bird** (9–2)	Willoughby (4)	2:12	24,720	52–32	L1
85	July 16 (1)	5:00 p.m. CDT	Red Sox	**W** 5–1	**Splittorff** (10–6)	Murphy (2–4)	—	2:04	—	53–32	W1
86	July 16 (2)	7:39 p.m. CDT	Red Sox	**W** 2–1	**Fitzmorris** (11–5)	Wise (7–7)	—	2:25	35,600	54–32	W2
87	July 17	2:15 p.m. CDT	Red Sox	**W** 2–1	**Littell** (6–3)	Tiant (10–7)	—	2:39	24,411	55–32	W3
88	July 18	1:30 p.m. CDT	Red Sox	**W** 6–3	**Pattin** (3–8)	Cleveland (4–5)	—	2:34	29,267	56–32	W4
89	July 19	7:30 p.m. CDT	Orioles	L 3–4	Palmer (13–8)	**Leonard** (10–4)	Martinez (6)	2:30	39,355	56–33	L1
90	July 20	7:30 p.m. CDT	Orioles	L 3–10	Garland (12–1)	**Bird** (9–3)	—	2:29	16,145	56–34	L2
91	July 21	7:30 p.m. CDT	Brewers	L 0–5	Travers (11–7)	**Fitzmorris** (11–6)	Frisella (5)	2:24	15,445	56–35	L3
92	July 22	7:30 p.m. CDT	Brewers	**W** 3–1	**Splittorff** (11–6)	Colborn (6–11)	**Littell** (9)	2:20	16,133	57–35	W1
93	July 23	10:00 p.m. CDT	@ Athletics	L 0–2	Blue (8–9)	**Pattin** (3–9)	—	2:25	9,173	57–36	L1
94	July 24	3:30 p.m. CDT	@ Athletics	**W** 6–5	**Leonard** (11–4)	Todd (6–8)	**Mingori** (9)	3:14	42,592	58–36	W1
95	July 25	3:30 p.m. CDT	@ Athletics	L 2–9	Abbott (2–2)	**Bird** (9–4)	—	2:23	10,237	58–37	L1
96	July 26	9:30 p.m. CDT	@ Angels	**W** 4–0	**Fitzmorris** (12–6)	Ryan (7–13)	–	2:32	18,753	59–37	W1
97	July 27	9:30 p.m. CDT	@ Angels	L 1–2	Tanana (12–7)	**Splittorff** (11–7)	–	2:02	8,342	59–38	L1
98	July 28	9:30 p.m. CDT	@ Angels	**W** 3–2 (15)	**Gura** (1–0)	Kirkwood (4–8)	–	4:04	9,947	60–38	W1
99	July 30	7:30 p.m. CDT	Rangers	**W** 2–1	**Leonard** (11–5)	Briles (7–7)	**Littell** (10)	2:48	28,411	61–38	W2
100	July 31	7:30 p.m. CDT	Rangers	L 2–4	Blyleven (8–12)	**Fitzmorris** (12–7)	–	2:41	35,786	61–39	L1

August: 17–14 (Home: 8–5; Away: 9–9)

#	Date	Time (CT)	Opponent	Score	Win	Loss	Save	Time of Game	Attendance	Record	Box/ Streak
101	August 1	7:30 p.m. CDT	Rangers	L 4–8	Perry (10–8)	**Hassler** (0–7)	–	3:15	24,732	61–40	L2
102	August 3	7:30 p.m. CDT	Twins	**W** 7–1	**Pattin** (4–9)	Bane (4–3)	—	2:28	16,939	62–40	W1
103	August 4	7:30 p.m. CDT	Twins	**W** 4–2	**Fitzmorris** (13–7)	Goltz (9–10)	**Littell** (11)	2:32	15,932	63–40	W2
104	August 5	7:30 p.m. CDT	Twins	**W** 6–4	**Leonard** (12–4)	Singer (8–8)	**Mingori** (10)	2:44	14,544	64–40	W3
105 (1)	August 6	5:30 p.m. CDT	@ White Sox	**W** 9–2	**Hassler** (1–7)	B. Johnson (9–10)	–	2:29	–	65–40	W4
106 (2)	August 6	8:34 p.m. CDT	@ White Sox	**W** 8–3	**Bird** (10–4)	Gossage (6–11)	–	2:00	13,824	66–40	W5
107	August 7	7:00 p.m. CDT	@ White Sox	L 3–5	Barrios (3–4)	**Mingori** (3–2)	–	2:16	30,382	66–41	L1
108 (1)	August 8	12:30 p.m. CDT	@ White Sox	L 2–5	Forster (2–8)	**Pattin** (4–10)	Gossage (1)	2:55	–	66–42	L2
109 (2)	August 8	4:00 p.m. CDT	@ White Sox	**W** 7–1	**Fitzmorris** (14–7)	Jefferson (2–5)	–	2:31	15,997	67–42	W1
110	August 9	7:30 p.m. CDT	Yankees	**W** 8–2	**Leonard** (13–4)	Holtzman (9–8)	—	2:10	40,435	68–42	W2
111	August 10	7:30 p.m. CDT	Yankees	L 1–2 (11)	Ellis (12–6)	**Mingori** (3–3)	Lyle (19)	2:46	25,173	68–43	L1
112	August 11	7:30 p.m. CDT	Yankees	L 3–5	Alexander (7–8)	**Bird** (10–5)	Lyle (20)	2:19	23,394	68–44	L2
116	August 16	7:30 p.m. CDT	Indians	**W** 6–1	**Pattin** (5–10)	Brown (7–8)	–	2:08	18,797	71–45	W3
117	August 17	7:30 p.m. CDT	Indians	**W** 4–3 (10)	**Littell** (7–3)	LaRoche (1–4)	–	3:09	14,836	72–45	W4
118	August 18	7:30 p.m. CDT	Indians	L 1–4	Eckersley (8–10)	**Fitzmorris** (14–9)	Kern (11)	2:44	15,095	72–46	L1
119	August 19	7:30 p.m. CDT	@ Brewers	L 4–6	Augustine (6–8)	**Leonard** (15–5)	Frisella (8)	2:39	10,554	72–47	L2
120	August 20	7:30 p.m. CDT	@ Brewers	**W** 3–0	**Hassler** (3–7)	Travers (14–10)	–	2:19	15,043	73–47	W1
121	August 21	1:30 p.m. CDT	@ Brewers	**W** 6–2	**Pattin** (6–10)	Colborn (7–13)	**Littell** (12)	2:50	17,725	74–47	W2
122	August 22	1:20 p.m. CDT	@ Brewers	**W** 7–4	**Bird** (11–5)	Frisella (4–2)	**Littell** (13)	2:30	16,596	75–47	W3
123	August 23	6:30 p.m. CDT	@ Indians	L 3–4	Eckersley (9–10)	**Mingori** (3–4)	–	2:35	9,581	75–48	L1
124	August 24	6:30 p.m. CDT	@ Indians	L 1–2	Rick Waits (6–5)	**Leonard** (15–6)	–	2:10	6,615	75–49	L2
125	August 25	6:30 p.m. CDT	@ Indians	**W** 2–1	**Hassler** (4–7)	Kern (8–7)	**Littell** (14)	2:55	7,113	76–49	W1
126	August 26	6:30 p.m. CDT	@ Red Sox	**W** 7–6 (15)	**Bruno** (1–0)	Willoughby (2–11)	—	4:46	24,199	77–49	W2
127	August 27	6:30 p.m. CDT	@ Red Sox	L 4–9	Jenkins (12–11)	**Bird** (11–6)	—	2:33	24,940	77–50	L1
128	August 28	1:00 p.m. CDT	@ Red Sox	**W** 8–3	**Fitzmorris** (15–9)	Lee (2–5)	**Littell** (15)	3:16	27,058	78–50	W1
129	August 29	1:00 p.m. CDT	@ Red Sox	L 6–15	Wise (10–10)	**Leonard** (15–7)	—	2:50	26,747	78–51	L1
130	August 30	6:30 p.m. CDT	@ Orioles	L 2–3	May (11–9)	**Hassler** (5–7)	—	2:29	6,249	78–52	L2
131	August 31	6:30 p.m. CDT	@ Orioles	L 3–4	Palmer (19–11)	**Pattin** (6–11)	Miller (6)	2:49	8,661	78–53	L3

September: 12–16 (Home: 6–7; Away: 6–9)

#	Date	Time (CT)	Opponent	Score	Win	Loss	Save	Time of Game	Attendance	Record	Box/ Streak
132	September 1	6:30 p.m. CDT	@ Orioles	L 1–7	Flanagan (1–4)	**Bird** (11–7)	—	2:30	8,007	78–54	L4
133	September 3	7:30 p.m. CDT	Rangers	L 1–4	Boggs (1–4)	**Fitzmorris** (15–10)	–	2:54	17,748	78–55	L5
134	September 4	7:30 p.m. CDT	Rangers	**W** 7–0	**Leonard** (16–7)	Umbarger (9–11)	–	2:18	31,541	79–55	W1
135	September 5	1:30 p.m. CDT	Rangers	L 1–3	Blyleven (11–15)	**Hassler** (5–8)	–	2:36	22,025	79–56	L1
136	September 6	7:30 p.m. CDT	Rangers	L 4–5	Hargan (6–6)	**Bird** (11–8)	Hoerner (7)	2:41	27,008	79–57	L2
137	September 7	7:30 p.m. CDT	Angels	L 1–2	Kirkwood (6–10)	**Pattin** (6–12)	–	2:26	9,225	79–58	L3
138	September 8	7:30 p.m. CDT	Angels	L 0–2	Drago (6–7)	**Fitzmorris** (15–11)	–	3:07	11,939	79–59	L4
139	September 9	7:30 p.m. CDT	Angels	**W** 6–5 (10)	**Mingori** (4–4)	Overy (0–2)	–	3:03	10,897	80–59	W1
140	September 10	8:00 p.m. CDT	@ Twins	L 3–18	Hughes (8–12)	**Hassler** (4–10)	—	3:37	8,912	80–60	L1
141	September 11	1:15 p.m. CDT	@ Twins	**W** 8–6	**Littell** (8–3)	Campbell (15–5)	—	2:29	8,955	81–60	W!
142	September 12	1:15 p.m. CDT	@ Twins	**W** 16–6	**Pattin** (7–12)	Redfern (5–8)	—	2:51	8,101	82–60	W2
143 (1)	September 13	5:30 p.m. CDT	@ White Sox	L 3–4	Knapp (3–1)	**Leonard** (16–8)	Hamilton (10)	2:33	–	82–61	L1
144 (2)	September 13	8:38 p.m. CDT	@ White Sox	L 4–5	Brett (10–9)	**Mingori** (4–5)	–	2:31	5,327	82–62	L2
145	September 14	7:30 p.m. CDT	@ White Sox	**W** 2–1	**Hassler** (5–10)	Forster (2–11)	–	2:08	2,762	83–62	W1
146	September 15	9:30 p.m. CDT	@ Angels	L 1–2	Ryan (14–17)	**Bird** (11–9)	–	2:22	6,350	83–63	L1
147	September 16	9:30 p.m. CDT	@ Angels	**W** 2–0	**Pattin** (8–12)	Tanana (16–10)	–	2:25	7,440	84–63	W1
148	September 17	7:30 p.m. CDT	White Sox	**W** 3–2	**Leonard** (17–8)	Gossage (9–15)	–	2:38	15,087	85–63	W2
149	September 18	7:30 p.m. CDT	White Sox	**W** 6–5	**Gura** (2–0)	Brett (10–10)	–	2:35	24,955	86–63	W3
150	September 19	1:30 p.m. CDT	White Sox	**W** 6–5	**Mingori** (5–5)	Forster (2–12)	–	2:43	39,797	87–63	W4
151	September 21	7:30 p.m. CDT	Athletics	**W** 3–1	**Bird** (12–9)	Bahnsen (8–7)	—	2:30	28,869	88–63	W1
152	September 22	7:30 p.m. CDT	Athletics	L 1–11	Blue (17–12)	**Pattin** (8–13)	—	2:21	36,064	88–64	L1
153	September 23	7:30 p.m. CDT	Athletics	L 1–8	Torrez (15–11)	**Leonard** (17–9)	—	3:01	34,077	88–65	L2
154	September 24	7:30 p.m. CDT	@ Rangers	**W** 2–1 (14)	**Gura** (3–0)	Foucault (8–8)	**Littell** (16)	4:35	6,949	89–65	W1
155	September 25	7:30 p.m. CDT	@ Rangers	L 0–1	Blyleven (13–16)	**Hassler** (5–11)	–	2:12	9,001	89–66	L1
156	September 26	2:00 p.m. CDT	@ Rangers	L 1–3	Briles (11–9)	**Bird** (12–10)	Hargan (1)	2:53	4,650	89–67	L2
157	September 27	10:00 p.m. CDT	@ Athletics	L 3–8	Blue (18–12)	**Leonard** (17–10)	—	3:08	37,914	89–68	L3
158	September 28	10:00 p.m. CDT	@ Athletics	L 0–1	Torrez (16–11)	**Pattin** (8–14)	—	2:05	9,464	89–69	L4
159	September 29	10:00 p.m. CDT	@ Athletics	**W** 4–0	**Gura** (4–9)	Mitchell (9–7)	—	2:15	19,631	90–69	W1

October: 0–3 (Home: 0–3; Away: 0–0)

#	Date	Time (CT)	Opponent	Score	Win	Loss	Save	Time of Game	Attendance	Record	Box/ Streak
160	October 1	7:30 p.m. CDT	Twins	L 3–4	Campbell (17–5)	**Littell** (8–4)	—	2:46	38,482	90–70	L1
161	October 2	1:30 p.m. CDT	Twins	L 2–3	Singer (13–10)	**Hassler** (5–12)	Campbell (20)	2:06	14,087	90–71	L2
162	October 3	1:30 p.m. CDT	Twins	L 3–5	Hughes (9–14)	**Splittorff** (11–8)	—	2:15	15,665	90–72	L3

Legend: = Royals win = Royals loss = Game postponed = Clinched division
Bold = Royals team member

=== Postseason Game log ===
1976 Postseason game log: 2–3 (Home: 1–1; Away: 1–2)
AL Championship Series: vs. New York Yankees 2–3 (Home: 1–1; Away: 1–2)

#	Date	Time (CT)	Opponent	Score	Win	Loss	Save	Time of Game	Attendance	Series	Box/ Streak
1	October 9	12 Noon CDT	Yankees	L 1–4	Hunter (1–0)	**Gura** (0–1)	—	2:09	41,077	NYY 1–0	L1
2	October 10	7:15 p.m. CDT	Yankees	**W** 7–3	**Splittorff** (1–0)	Figueroa (0–1)	—	2:45	41,091	Tied 1–1	W1
3	October 12	7:15 p.m. CDT	@ Yankees	L 3–5	Ellis (1–0)	**Hassler** (0–1)	Lyle (1)	3:00	56,808	NYY 2–1	L1
4	October 13	2:15 p.m. CDT	@ Yankees	**W** 7–4	**Bird** (1–0)	Hunter (1–1)	**Mingori** (1)	2:50	56,355	Tied 2–2	W1
5	October 14	7:15 p.m. CDT	@ Yankees	L 6–7	Tidrow (1–0)	**Littell** (0–1)	—	3:13	56,821	NYY 3–2	L1

Legend: = Win = Loss = Postponement
Bold = Royals team member

== Player stats ==
= Indicates team leader

= Indicates league leader

=== Batting ===
==== Starters by position ====
Note: Pos = Position; G = Games played; AB = At bats; H = Hits; Avg. = Batting average; HR = Home runs; RBI = Runs batted in

Pos	Player	G	AB	H	Avg.	HR	RBI
C	Buck Martinez	95	267	61	.228	5	34
1B	John Mayberry	161*	594	138	.232	13	95
2B	Frank White	152	446	102	.229	2	46
3B	George Brett	159	645	215	.333	7	67
SS	Freddie Patek	144	432	104	.241	1	43
LF	Tom Poquette	104	344	104	.302	2	34
CF	Amos Otis	153	592	165	.279	18	86
RF	Al Cowens	152	581	154	.265	3	59
DH	Hal McRae	149	527	175	.332	8	73

- Tied with Rusty Staub (Detroit) and Robin Yount (Milwaukee) for league lead

==== Other batters ====
Note: G = Games played; AB = At bats; H = Hits; Avg. = Batting average; HR = Home runs; RBI = Runs batted in

Player	G	AB	H	Avg.	HR	RBI
Jim Wohlford	107	293	73	.249	1	24
Bob Stinson	79	209	55	.263	2	25
Dave Nelson	78	153	36	.235	1	17
Cookie Rojas	63	132	32	.242	0	16
Jamie Quirk	64	114	28	.246	1	15
Tony Solaita	31	68	16	.235	0	9
Ruppert Jones	28	51	11	.216	1	7
John Wathan	27	42	12	.286	0	5
Fran Healy	8	24	3	.125	0	1
Tommy Davis	8	19	5	.263	0	0
Willie Wilson	12	6	1	.167	0	0

=== Pitching ===
==== Starting pitchers ====
Note: G = Games pitched; IP = Innings pitched; W = Wins; L = Losses; ERA = Earned run average; SO = Strikeouts

Player	G	IP	W	L	ERA	SO
Dennis Leonard	35	259.0	17	10	3.51	150
Al Fitzmorris	35	220.1	15	11	3.06	80
Paul Splittorff	26	158.2	11	8	3.97	59
Andy Hassler	19	99.2	5	6	2.89	45
Steve Busby	13	71.2	3	3	4.40	29

==== Other pitchers ====
Note: G = Games pitched; IP = Innings pitched; W = Wins; L = Losses; ERA = Earned run average; SO = Strikeouts

Player	G	IP	W	L	ERA	SO
Doug Bird	39	197.2	12	10	3.37	107
Marty Pattin	44	141.0	8	14	2.49	65

==== Relief pitchers ====
Note: G = Games pitched; W = Wins; L = Losses; SV = Saves; ERA = Earned run average; SO = Strikeouts

Player	G	W	L	SV	ERA	SO
Mark Littell	60	8	4	16	2.08	92
Steve Mingori	55	5	5	10	2.32	38
Tom Hall	31	1	1	1	4.45	25
Larry Gura	20	4	0	1	2.30	22
Tom Bruno	12	1	0	0	6.75	11
Bob McClure	8	0	0	0	9.00	3
Jerry Cram	4	0	0	0	6.23	2
Roger Nelson	3	0	0	0	2.08	4
Ray Sadecki	3	0	0	0	0.00	1
Ken Sanders	3	0	0	0	0.00	2

== ALCS ==
=== Game 1 ===
October 9, 1976, at Royals Stadium

Team	1	2	3	4	5	6	7	8	9	R	H	E
New York	2	0	0	0	0	0	0	0	2	4	12	0
Kansas City	0	0	0	0	0	0	0	1	0	1	5	2
W: Catfish Hunter (1–0) L: Larry Gura (0–1)
HR: None

=== Game 2 ===
October 10, 1976, at Royals Stadium

Team	1	2	3	4	5	6	7	8	9	R	H	E
New York	0	1	2	0	0	0	0	0	0	3	12	5
Kansas City	2	0	0	0	0	2	0	3	0	7	9	0
W: Paul Splittorff (1–0) L: Ed Figueroa (0–1)
HR: None

=== Game 3 ===
October 12, 1976, at Yankee Stadium

Team	1	2	3	4	5	6	7	8	9	R	H	E
Kansas City	3	0	0	0	0	0	0	0	0	3	6	0
New York	0	0	0	2	0	3	0	0	X	5	9	0
W: Dock Ellis (1–0) L: Andy Hassler (0–1) S: Sparky Lyle (1)
HR: NYY: – Chris Chambliss (1)

=== Game 4 ===
October 13, 1976, at Yankee Stadium

Team	1	2	3	4	5	6	7	8	9	R	H	E
Kansas City	0	3	0	2	0	1	0	1	0	7	9	1
New York	0	2	0	0	0	0	1	0	1	4	11	0
W: Doug Bird (1–0) L: Catfish Hunter (1–1) S: Steve Mingori (1)
HR: NYY: – Graig Nettles 2 (2)

=== Game 5 ===
October 14, 1976, at Yankee Stadium

Team	1	2	3	4	5	6	7	8	9	R	H	E
Kansas City	2	1	0	0	0	0	0	3	0	6	11	1
New York	2	0	2	0	0	2	0	0	1	7	11	1
W: Dick Tidrow (1–0) L: Mark Littell (0–1)
HR: KCR: – John Mayberry (1), George Brett (1) NYY: – Chris Chambliss (2)

== Farm system ==
Level	Team	League	Manager
AAA	Omaha Royals	American Association	Billy Gardner
AA	Jacksonville Suns	Southern League	Bill Scripture
A	Waterloo Royals	Midwest League	John Sullivan
Rookie	GCL Royals	Gulf Coast League	José Martínez

LEAGUE CHAMPIONS: Waterloo
