= 1975 Kansas City Royals season =

1975 Kansas City Royals
- League: American League
- Division: West
- Ballpark: Royals Stadium
- City: Kansas City, Missouri
- Record: 91–71 (.562)
- Divisional place: 2nd
- Owners: Ewing Kauffman
- General managers: Joe Burke
- Managers: Jack McKeon (50–46, .521); Whitey Herzog (41–25, .621)
- Television: KBMA (Buddy Blattner, Denny Matthews)
- Radio: WIBW (AM) (Buddy Blattner, Denny Matthews, Fred White)

The 1975 Kansas City Royals season was their seventh in Major League Baseball. The Royals' 91–71 record was the best in franchise history and Kansas City finished second in the American League West, six games behind the Oakland Athletics. Manager Jack McKeon was fired on July 24 and was replaced by Whitey Herzog. John Mayberry became the first Royals player to hit at least 30 home runs in a season (34) and also set a franchise single-season record with 106 runs batted in.

== Offseason ==
- January 24, 1975: Harmon Killebrew was signed as a free agent by the Royals.

== Regular season ==
=== Season standings ===
AL West
Team	W	L	Pct.	GB	Home	Road
Oakland Athletics	98	64	.605	—	54‍–‍27	44‍–‍37
Kansas City Royals	91	71	.562	7	51‍–‍30	40‍–‍41
Texas Rangers	79	83	.488	19	39‍–‍41	40‍–‍42
Minnesota Twins	76	83	.478	20½	39‍–‍43	37‍–‍40
Chicago White Sox	75	86	.466	22½	42‍–‍39	33‍–‍47
California Angels	72	89	.447	25½	35‍–‍46	37‍–‍43

=== Record vs. opponents ===
1975 American League record Sources:
Team	BAL	BOS	CAL	CWS	CLE	DET	KC	MIL	MIN	NYY	OAK	TEX
Baltimore	—	9–9	6–6	7–4	10–8	12–4	7–5	14–4	6–6	8–10	4–8	7–5
Boston	9–9	—	6–6	8–4	7–11	13–5	7–5	10–8	10–2	11–5	6–6	8–4
California	6–6	6–6	—	9–9	3–9	6–5	4–14	7–5	8–10	7–5	7–11	9–9
Chicago	4–7	4–8	9–9	—	7–5	5–7	9–9	8–4	9–9	6–6	9–9	5–13
Cleveland	8–10	11–7	9–3	5–7	—	12–6	6–6	9–9	3–6	9–9	2–10	5–7
Detroit	4–12	5–13	5–6	7–5	6–12	—	6–6	7–11	4–8	6–12	6–6	1–11
Kansas City	5–7	5–7	14–4	9–9	6–6	6–6	—	7–5	11–7	7–5	11–7	14–4
Milwaukee	4–14	8–10	5–7	4–8	9–9	11–7	5–7	—	2–10	9–9	5–7	6–6
Minnesota	6–6	2–10	10–8	9–9	6–3	8–4	7–11	10–2	—	4–8	6–12	8–10
New York	10–8	5–11	5–7	6–6	9–9	12–6	5–7	9–9	8–4	—	6–6	8–4
Oakland	8–4	6–6	11–7	9–9	10–2	6–6	11–7	7–5	12–6	6–6	—	12–6
Texas	5–7	4–8	9–9	13–5	7–5	11–1	4–14	6–6	10–8	4–8	6–12	—

=== Notable transactions ===
- April 10, 1975: Doug Corbett was released by the Royals.
- June 3, 1975: 1975 Major League Baseball draft
  - Clint Hurdle was drafted by the Royals in the 1st round (9th pick).
  - Ron Hassey was drafted by the Royals in the 22nd round, but did not sign.
- September 15, 1975: Mark Williams was traded by the Royals to the Oakland Athletics for Rick Ingalls (minors).

=== Roster ===
1975 Kansas City Royals
Roster
Pitchers: 29 Doug Bird; 19 Nelson Briles; 40 Steve Busby; 43 Bruce Dal Canton; 39 Al Fitzmorris; 22 Dennis Leonard; 17 Mark Littell; 10 Bob McClure; 41 Lindy McDaniel; 23 Steve Mingori; 33 Marty Pattin; 43 Ray Sadecki; 34 Paul Splittorff; 35 George Throop	Catchers: 16 Fran Healy; 21 Buck Martinez; 15 Bob Stinson; Infielders: 5 George Brett; 3 Harmon Killebrew; 7 John Mayberry; 2 Freddie Patek; 1 Cookie Rojas; 25,44 Rodney Scott; 8 Tony Solaita; 20 Frank White	Outfielders: 18 Al Cowens; 12 Gary Martz; 11 Hal McRae; 26 Amos Otis; 28 Vada Pinson; 9 Jamie Quirk; 6 Jim Wohlford	Manager: 24 Whitey Herzog; 31 Jack McKeon; Coaches: 14 Steve Boros; 36 Galen Cisco; 4 Harry Dunlop; 27 Charley Lau

== Player stats ==
= Indicates team leader

=== Batting ===
==== Starters by position ====
Note: Pos = Position; G = Games played; AB = At bats; H = Hits; Avg. = Batting average; HR = Home runs; RBI = Runs batted in

Pos	Player	G	AB	H	Avg.	HR	RBI
C	Buck Martinez	80	226	51	.226	3	23
1B	John Mayberry	156	554	161	.291	34	106
2B	Cookie Rojas	120	406	103	.254	2	37
SS	Freddie Patek	136	483	110	.228	5	45
3B	George Brett	159	634	195	.308	11	89
LF	Hal McRae	126	480	147	.306	5	71
CF	Amos Otis	132	470	116	.247	9	46
RF	Jim Wohlford	116	353	90	.255	0	30
DH	Harmon Killebrew	106	312	62	.199	14	44

==== Other batters ====
Note: G = Games played; AB = At bats; H = Hits; Avg. = Batting average; HR = Home runs; RBI = Runs batted in

Player	G	AB	H	Avg.	HR	RBI
Al Cowens	120	328	91	.277	4	42
Vada Pinson	103	319	71	.223	4	21
Frank White	111	304	76	.250	7	36
Tony Solaita	93	231	60	.260	16	44
Fran Healy	56	188	48	.255	2	18
Bob Stinson	63	147	39	.265	1	9
Jamie Quirk	14	39	10	.256	1	5
Rodney Scott	48	15	1	.067	0	0
Gary Martz	1	1	0	.000	0	0

=== Pitching ===
==== Starting pitchers ====
Note: G = Games pitched; IP = Innings pitched; W = Wins; L = Losses; ERA = Earned run average; SO = Strikeouts

Player	G	IP	W	L	ERA	SO
Steve Busby	34	260.1	18	12	3.08	160
Al Fitzmorris	35	242.0	16	12	3.57	78
Dennis Leonard	32	212.1	15	7	3.77	146

==== Other pitchers ====
Note: G = Games pitched; IP = Innings pitched; W = Wins; L = Losses; ERA = Earned run average; SO = Strikeouts

Player	G	IP	W	L	ERA	SO
Marty Pattin	44	177.0	10	10	3.25	89
Paul Splittorff	35	159.0	9	10	3.17	76
Nelson Briles	24	112.0	6	6	4.26	73
Mark Littell	7	24.1	1	2	3.70	19
Bruce Dal Canton	4	8.2	0	2	15.58	5

==== Relief pitchers ====
Note: G = Games pitched; W = Wins; L = Losses; SV = Saves; ERA = Earned run average; SO = Strikeouts

Player	G	W	L	SV	ERA	SO
Doug Bird	51	9	6	11	3.25	81
Lindy McDaniel	40	5	1	1	4.15	40
Steve Mingori	36	0	3	2	2.50	25
Bob McClure	12	1	0	1	0.00	15
George Throop	7	0	0	2	4.00	8
Ray Sadecki	5	1	0	0	3.00	0

== Awards and honors ==
All-Star Game

- Steve Busby, Pitcher, Reserve
- Hal McRae, Outfield, Reserve

== Farm system ==
Level	Team	League	Manager
AAA	Omaha Royals	American Association	Billy Gardner
AA	Jacksonville Suns	Southern League	Bill Scripture
A	Waterloo Royals	Midwest League	John Sullivan
Rookie	GCL Royals	Gulf Coast League	Gary Blaylock

LEAGUE CHAMPIONS: Waterloo
