= Art Frantz =

American baseball umpire (1921–2008)

Frantz

Arthur Frank Frantz (March 1, 1921 – January 24, 2008) was an American umpire in Major League Baseball who worked in the American League from 1969 to 1977. He was crew chief for the 1975 World Series, and also officiated in the American League Championship Series in 1972 and 1976 as well as the 1974 All-Star Game.

== Biography ==
Born in Chicago, Frantz was city champion in ice skating, roller skating, horseshoes and table tennis. He was a pitcher and shortstop in the minor leagues from 1940 to 1950, interrupted by service in the Army Air Forces during World War II. Playing in the St. Louis Cardinals' system, he briefly rose as high as the American Association with the Columbus Red Birds in 1944 and the International League with the Rochester Red Wings in 1945. He also played semi-pro football for four years in Rochester and Watertown, New York. He became an umpire in the New York–Penn League from 1958 to 1962 and the Pacific Coast League from 1963 to 1968 before moving up to the AL. In addition to his postseason and All-Star work, he was behind the plate on July 30, 1973, when Jim Bibby pitched the first no-hitter in Texas Rangers history, a 6–0 victory over the defending World Series champion Oakland Athletics.

Frantz was the home plate umpire for Game 5 of the 1976 American League Championship Series, which ended when the New York Yankees' Chris Chambliss hit a walk-off home run off Kansas City Royals pitcher Mark Littell on the first pitch of the bottom of the ninth inning, sending the Yankees to their first World Series in 12 years. After the ball cleared the fence, Chambliss was mobbed by fans (who tore out second base) on the basepaths and did not make an attempt to touch home plate, instead running straight toward the dugout and the safety of the Yankee clubhouse. Frantz waited for Chambliss to return and touch the area of home plate, since the actual home plate had been dug up. Chambliss, who was grilled by teammate Graig Nettles as to whether or not he touched the plate, was escorted back to the field once he was notified Frantz was waiting for him. Had Kansas City manager Whitey Herzog appealed the play, the game likely would have been ordered to be continued (likely at a later date due to the unplayability of the field at that point), since rules state a runner must touch all the bases on a home run. However, given the chaos following Chambliss' blast and the magnitude of the championship game, Herzog did not protest on a technicality. After this incident, the rules were changed to allow the umpire to award any base a runner or the batter cannot reach due to fans rushing the field.

Frantz and his wife Marge had two sons and two daughters. He died at age 86 in Niles, Illinois, from congestive heart failure.

== See also ==
- List of Major League Baseball umpires (disambiguation)
