= 1976 American League Championship Series =

8th edition of Major League Baseball's American League Championship Series

Team (Wins)	Managers	Season
New York Yankees (3)	Billy Martin	97–62, .610, GA: 10½
Kansas City Royals (2)	Whitey Herzog	90–72, .556, GA: 2½
- Dates: October 9–14
- Umpires: Joe Brinkman; Larry Barnett; George Maloney; Bill Haller (crew chief); Art Frantz; Larry McCoy

Broadcast
- Television: ABC; WPIX (NYY); KBMA-TV (KC)
- TV announcers: ABC: Bob Uecker (Game 1); Keith Jackson (Games 2–5); Howard Cosell and Reggie Jackson; WPIX: Phil Rizzuto, Frank Messer, and Bill White; KBMA-TV: Denny Matthews and Fred White
- Radio: CBS; WMCA (NYY); WIBW (KC)
- Radio announcers: CBS: Ernie Harwell and Ned Martin; WMCA: Phil Rizzuto, Frank Messer, and Bill White; WIBW: Denny Matthews and Fred White

The 1976 American League Championship Series was a best-of-five playoff in Major League Baseball's 1976 postseason which pitted the New York Yankees against the Kansas City Royals for the American League pennant and the right to represent the American League in the 1976 World Series. The Yankees defeated the Royals in five games to advance to win their first pennant in twelve years.

Chris Chambliss would cap a memorable series with the first walk-off home run to end a League Championship Series, a feat not matched again for 27 years.

== Summary ==
=== New York Yankees vs. Kansas City Royals ===
New York won the series, 3–2.

Game	Date	Score	Location	Time	Attendance
1	October 9	New York Yankees – 4, Kansas City Royals – 1	Royals Stadium	2:09	41,077
2	October 10	New York Yankees – 3, Kansas City Royals – 7	Royals Stadium	2:45	41,091
3	October 12	Kansas City Royals – 3, New York Yankees – 5	Yankee Stadium	3:00	56,808
4	October 13	Kansas City Royals – 7, New York Yankees – 4	Yankee Stadium	2:50	56,355
5	October 14	Kansas City Royals – 6, New York Yankees – 7	Yankee Stadium	3:13	56,821

== Game summaries ==
=== Game 1 ===
October 9, 1976 12:00 pm (CT) at Royals Stadium in Kansas City, Missouri 72 °F (22 °C) light rain
Team	1	2	3	4	5	6	7	8	9	R	H	E
New York	2	0	0	0	0	0	0	0	2	4	12	0
Kansas City	0	0	0	0	0	0	0	1	0	1	5	2
WP: Catfish Hunter (1–0) LP: Larry Gura (0–1)

The opener was played on a bright Saturday afternoon at Royals Stadium and pitted Yankee ace Jim "Catfish" Hunter against left-hander and ex-Yankee Larry Gura. The Yankees got off to a quick start, scoring two in the first aided by a pair of George Brett throwing errors. Hunter was in top form and went the distance, not going to a three-ball count the entire game. While the Royals were able to halve that margin going into the ninth, Roy White's two-run double in the top of the frame gave the Yanks two insurance runs that were the final scoring in a tidy 4–1 win.

=== Game 2 ===
October 10, 1976 7:15 pm (CT) at Royals Stadium in Kansas City, Missouri 55 °F (13 °C) clear
Team	1	2	3	4	5	6	7	8	9	R	H	E
New York	0	1	2	0	0	0	0	0	0	3	12	5
Kansas City	2	0	0	0	0	2	0	3	X	7	9	0
WP: Paul Splittorff (1–0) LP: Ed Figueroa (0–1)

Five Yankee errors helped key the Royals series-tying win. Lefty Paul Splittorff was solid with 5 2/3 innings of work in relief of Brooklyn native Dennis Leonard, while Yankee reliever Dick Tidrow was ineffective and permitted three more Kansas City runs to score in the eighth after relieving starter Ed Figueroa with one out in the sixth. The series, now tied at one, moved to New York and newly remodelled Yankee Stadium for the remaining three games.

=== Game 3 ===
October 12, 1976 8:15 pm (ET) at Yankee Stadium in Bronx, New York 55 °F (13 °C) clear
Team	1	2	3	4	5	6	7	8	9	R	H	E
Kansas City	3	0	0	0	0	0	0	0	0	3	6	0
New York	0	0	0	2	0	3	0	0	X	5	9	0
WP: Dock Ellis (1–0) LP: Andy Hassler (0–1) Sv: Sparky Lyle (1); Home runs: KC: None; NYY: Chris Chambliss (1)

The first Yankee post-season home game since 1964 started ominously for the Bombers, as the Royals tagged righty Dock Ellis for three runs in the first. He settled down immediately after though and went eight solid innings, aided by several double plays and two base runners caught stealing. The Yankees narrowed the margin to one in the fourth on a Chris Chambliss two-run homer off Andy Hassler and then tacked on three more in the sixth, as Kansas City manager Whitey Herzog carted in four relievers in that inning alone. Sparky Lyle got the save by pitching a scoreless ninth inning, as the Bronx Bombers took a two games to one lead.

=== Game 4 ===
October 13, 1976 3:15 pm (ET) at Yankee Stadium in Bronx, New York 68 °F (20 °C) mostly cloudy
Team	1	2	3	4	5	6	7	8	9	R	H	E
Kansas City	0	3	0	2	0	1	0	1	0	7	9	1
New York	0	2	0	0	0	0	1	0	1	4	11	0
WP: Doug Bird (1–0) LP: Catfish Hunter (1–1) Sv: Steve Mingori (1); Home runs: KC: None; NYY: Graig Nettles 2 (2)

Hoping to wrap up the series in four games, Yankee manager Billy Martin brought back Catfish Hunter on three days' rest while the Royals did the same, bringing back Larry Gura. Neither fared well, as Gura gave up six hits and two runs in two innings, while Hunter lasted three and surrendered five runs on five hits. Though the Yankees' bullpen was able to hold Kansas City to only two runs over six innings, winning pitcher Doug Bird only gave up one in 4 2/3, while lefty Steve Mingori pitched 2 1/3 and allowed only one tally, picking up the save. The Yankee offense was highlighted by Graig Nettles' two homers and three RBI. The series was then knotted at two, with a deciding Game 5 to be played the next night.

=== Game 5 ===
October 14, 1976 8:15 pm (ET) at Yankee Stadium in Bronx, New York 55 °F (13 °C) partly cloudy
Team	1	2	3	4	5	6	7	8	9	R	H	E
Kansas City	2	1	0	0	0	0	0	3	0	6	11	1
New York	2	0	2	0	0	2	0	0	1	7	11	1
WP: Dick Tidrow (1–0) LP: Mark Littell (0–1); Home runs: KC: John Mayberry (1), George Brett (1); NYY: Chris Chambliss (2)

The deciding game was a fitting ending to a thrilling series, as both teams fought tooth and nail to bring home the AL flag. It culminated in a moment of sheer, unbridled joy for the winners and stunned disbelief for the losers. The Yankees started Ed Figueroa on three days rest, as the Royals did likewise, starting Dennis Leonard. The Royals jumped out on top in the first, as Brett doubled and scored on John Mayberry's two-run homer. The Yankees quickly countered in their half, with Mickey Rivers tripling and scoring on Roy White's infield single. White went to third after Thurman Munson singled. Herzog removed Leonard and brought in Game 2 winner Paul Splittorff, who limited the damage by allowing only Chambliss' sacrifice fly.

The Royals countered with one in the second, but the Yanks jumped ahead in the third, as they tacked on two; one on a Munson single and the other on a Chambliss' ground out. The Yanks added on in the sixth, scoring twice; once on a Munson single and a second time on a Brett throwing error.

Figueroa held that lead going into the eighth. After Al Cowens led off with a single, Billy Martin brought in lefty Grant Jackson. He allowed a single to pinch hitter Jim Wohlford. Brett then stunned the sell-out crowd of 56,821 by planting Jackson's second pitch just over the short right-field wall, tying the game at six.

In the top of the ninth, Buck Martinez singled with two outs off Dick Tidrow. Al Cowens followed with a walk. Wohlford batted for a second time and hit a slow bouncer that Graig Nettles fielded and threw to second to force out Cowens, but ABC's cameras and replays showed Cowens was clearly safe.

All this was a prelude to the bottom of the ninth inning, when, at 11:43 pm, Chris Chambliss turned on Kansas City reliever Mark Littell's first pitch and sent it over the right center field wall. Thousands of fans vaulted over the dugouts and walls and celebrated the Yankees' first pennant in 12 years. Chambliss reached second, then dodged hordes of spectators in trying to reach third. He then proceeded to make a beeline towards the safety of the clubhouse, as the area around home plate and much of the field was covered with celebrating fans. Some time later, Chambliss was escorted back out onto the field to touch home, but the plate had been stolen. He touched the area where the plate had been. He was later informed by the umpires that given the circumstances of the situation, they would have counted the run regardless.

== Composite box ==
1976 ALCS (3–2): New York Yankees over Kansas City Royals

Team	1	2	3	4	5	6	7	8	9	R	H	E
New York Yankees	4	3	4	2	0	5	1	0	4	23	55	6
Kansas City Royals	7	4	0	2	0	3	0	8	0	24	40	4
Total attendance: 252,152 Average attendance: 50,430

== Aftermath ==
Chris Chambliss was later cornered in the Yankee locker room by Graig Nettles, who asked him if he had touched home. Chambliss responded that he had not, because there were too many people in the way. Nettles then told him that home plate umpire Art Frantz was waiting for him out on the field for him to touch home so that the home run could be ruled official. Chambliss was then escorted out to the field and touched the area where home had been.

Kansas City manager Whitey Herzog did not attempt to contest the home run, although major league rules state that a player must touch all the bases on any hit or when running the bases. In this case, the mayhem on the field made that task impossible, and, as mentioned above, the umpires had already decided that the run counted.

As a result, MLB amended rule 4.09 calling it "The Chris Chambliss Rule" The exception states: Rule 4.09(b) Comment: An exception will be if fans rush onto the field and physically prevent the runner from touching home plate or the batter from touching first base. In such cases, the umpires shall award the runner the base because of the obstruction by the fans. This had the effect of codifying the decision the umpires made in Game 5.

George Brett's home run was the first of nine that he hit in ALCS competition. Six of those came against the Yankees: one in 1976, three in 1978, and two in 1980. His other three ALCS home runs, which came in the 1985 ALCS, were all against one pitcher, Doyle Alexander of the Blue Jays. Alexander was a Yankee in 1976. He warmed up in the bullpen during Game 5, and started the first game of the World Series for them against the Cincinnati Reds.

The series also contained some interesting side stories. Kansas City pitcher Larry Gura publicly criticized Yankee manager Billy Martin prior to the series, saying that Martin treated him shabbily in the short time Martin was his manager in New York. Gura was on the Yankees' roster from spring training till the time he was traded to Kansas City on May 16. He did not appear in any games for the Yankees in that time. Martin responded by saying that if he had him there with the Yankees at that moment, he'd get rid of him again. George Brett also had harsh words for Martin, as he claimed that Martin had lied to his brother, pitcher Ken Brett, when Ken spent the first two months of 1976 with the Yanks. George's brother appeared in two games for the Yankees over two months, and was then traded to the Chicago White Sox.

This was the first of three consecutive ALCS between the two teams. They also went head to head in 1977 and 1978, with the Yankees coming out on top again. The Royals, however, exacted a big measure of revenge when they met again in the 1980 ALCS and swept the Yankees in three straight. Reggie Jackson, who was doing broadcast commentary for the 1976 ALCS, signed with the Yankees on November 29, 1976.

27 years later, the Yankees would clinch a pennant via home run again when Aaron Boone hit an extra-inning solo home run against the Red Sox in 2003.
