= Jim Mason (baseball) =

American baseball player (born 1950)

- Shortstop
- Born: August 14, 1950 (age 75); Mobile, Alabama, U.S.
- Batted: Left Threw: Right

MLB debut
- September 26, 1971, for the Washington Senators

Last MLB appearance
- September 24, 1979, for the Montreal Expos

MLB statistics
- Batting average: .203
- Home runs: 12
- Runs batted in: 114
- Stats at Baseball Reference

Teams
- Washington Senators / Texas Rangers (1971–1973); New York Yankees (1974–1976); Toronto Blue Jays (1977); Texas Rangers (1977–1978); Montreal Expos (1979)

James Percy Mason (born August 14, 1950) is an American former professional baseball player. He played in Major League Baseball as a shortstop from 1971 to 1979 for the Washington Senators / Texas Rangers, New York Yankees, Toronto Blue Jays, and Montreal Expos. Mason was a member of the 1976 American League pennant-winning New York Yankees team.

== Career ==
Mason was born in Mobile, Alabama, where he attended Murphy High School. He was drafted by the Washington Senators in the 2nd round of the 1968 Major League Baseball draft. He made his major league debut with the Senators on September 26, 1971 at the age of 21. The 1971 season would be the Senator's final season in Washington D.C. before moving to Texas and changing their name to the Texas Rangers.

Mason's contract was sold by the Rangers to the Yankees at the Winter Meetings on December 6, 1973. He was a member of the Yankees during the 1976 World Series against the Cincinnati Reds. Although he did not play in the 1976 American League Championship Series, he played three games in the World Series. In his only plate appearance of the series, Mason hit a home run off Pat Zachry. This turned out to be Mason's only postseason plate appearance, and the Yankees' only home run of their four-game series loss. It was also the 500th home run in the history of the World Series.

Because of Mason's low batting average, which hovered just over .200, his name, along with that of catcher Leo Dixon, was proposed for inclusion in a new term for poor hitting called the Mason Dixon Line (.204), which is closer to .200 than the Mendoza Line of Mario Mendoza (.215).

Mason is one of a handful of players to hit four doubles in one game, doing so while with the Yankees against his former team, the Rangers, at Arlington Stadium on July 8, 1974.
