= Gary Martz =

American baseball player (1951–2020)

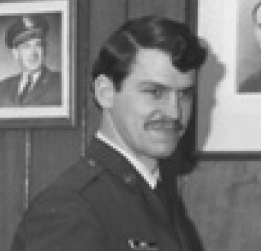
- Martz with the Washington Air National Guard
- Outfielder
- Born: January 10, 1951 (age 75); Spokane, Washington
- Batted: Right Threw: Right

MLB debut
- July 8, 1975, for the Kansas City Royals

Last MLB appearance
- July 8, 1975, for the Kansas City Royals

MLB statistics
- At-bats: 1
- Batting average: .000
- Putouts: 1
- Stats at Baseball Reference

Teams
- Kansas City Royals (1975)

Gary Arthur Martz (born January 10, 1951) is a former Major League Baseball outfielder who played for one season. He played in one game for the Kansas City Royals on July 8 during the 1975 Kansas City Royals season.

Martz attended West Valley High School in Spokane, Washington and received scholarship offers to play college baseball at Washington State and college football as a quarterback at Idaho. He instead chose to sign with the Seattle Pilots after being drafted in the fifth round of the 1969 MLB draft.

During the Vietnam War, in order to avoid the draft, Martz joined a reserve component of the United States Armed Forces. According to author Jacob Kornhauser, Martz was a member of the United States Army Reserve. However, according to the Washington Air National Guard, Martz was an airman in the 141st Air Refueling Wing who reached the rank of Airman first class at least.

On March 29, 1975, the Kansas City Royals purchased his contract from the Milwaukee Brewers. His only Major League appearance came on July 8, 1975, at Royals Stadium against the Brewers. Martz pinch hit for John Mayberry in the eighth inning. He swung at the first pitch from Rick Austin, grounding the ball to Don Money at third base, which resulted in his only career R.B.I., driving in future Hall of Famer George Brett and forcing Hal McRae out at second base. The next two batters, future Hall of Famer Harmon Killebrew and Rodney Scott also grounded out to Money. In the following inning, Martz replaced McRae in left field and caught a fly ball from Bill Sharp for the first out of the ninth inning. Future Hall of Famers Hank Aaron and Robin Yount also played in the game.

Martz was demoted the following week and replaced on the roster by Amos Otis. Before the 1978 season, Martz was traded to the Pittsburgh Pirates who would release him before the season began. Two weeks later, his wife filed for divorce.

During his playing career, Martz had been completing college courses using a stipend provided by the Pilots. He would eventually earn a bachelor's degree in math and spend the next 30 years working in computer analysis and data processing for companies such as Intel.
