= 1976 World Series =

1976 Major League Baseball championship series

Team (Wins)	Managers	Season
Cincinnati Reds (4)	Sparky Anderson	102–60, .630, GA: 10
New York Yankees (0)	Billy Martin	97–62, .610, GA: 10 1/2
- Dates: October 16–21
- Venue(s): Riverfront Stadium (Cincinnati); Yankee Stadium (New York)
- MVP: Johnny Bench (Cincinnati)
- Umpires: Lee Weyer (NL), Lou DiMuro (AL), Billy Williams (NL), Bill Deegan (AL), Bruce Froemming (NL), Dave Phillips (AL)
- Hall of Famers: Reds: Sparky Anderson (mgr.); Johnny Bench; Joe Morgan; Tony Pérez; Yankees: Catfish Hunter

Broadcast
- Television: NBC
- TV announcers: Joe Garagiola; Marty Brennaman (in Cincinnati); Phil Rizzuto (in New York); Tony Kubek
- Radio: CBS
- Radio announcers: Bill White (in Cincinnati); Marty Brennaman (in New York); Win Elliot
- ALCS: New York Yankees over Kansas City Royals (3–2)
- NLCS: Cincinnati Reds over Philadelphia Phillies (3–0)

The 1976 World Series was the championship series of Major League Baseball's (MLB) 1976 season. The 73rd edition of the World Series, it was a best-of-seven playoff played between the National League (NL) champion Cincinnati Reds and the American League (AL) champion New York Yankees. The Reds swept the Series in four games to repeat as champions, avenging their 1939 and 1961 World Series losses to the Yankees. The 1976 Reds became, and remain, the only team to sweep an entire multi-tier postseason, one of the crowning achievements of the franchise's Big Red Machine era. They also became the third NL team (following the Chicago Cubs in 1907–08 and the New York Giants in 1921–22) to win consecutive World Series, and were the last to do so until the Los Angeles Dodgers in 2024–25.

This was also the second time that the Yankees were swept in a World Series in four straight games, the Los Angeles Dodgers having previously done so in 1963. (The New York Giants "swept" them in five games in 1922, with Game 2 ending in a tie due to being called on account of darkness.) It was also the first World Series sweep in ten years, and the first for the Reds; their next came against the Oakland Athletics in 1990.

This World Series was the first in which the designated hitter rule, which had been introduced in the AL three years prior, was in effect; it was used for all games (for the first ten years, the use of the DH alternated; in even-numbered years, it was used in all games, in odd-numbered years, it was not used; starting in 1986, the DH was used only in games played at the AL representative's park). The use of the DH wound up benefiting the Reds, who were able to get utility infielder Dan Driessen's bat in the lineup. Driessen hit .357 with a home run. Elliott Maddox, Carlos May, and Lou Piniella shared the role for the Yankees, but were less productive. Game 1, played at Cincinnati's Riverfront Stadium, marked the first time the DH was used in a NL ballpark. Game 2, also at Riverfront Stadium, was the first World Series weekend game to be scheduled at night.

Reds catcher Johnny Bench was named the World Series MVP. Bench batted .533 with 8 hits, 6 RBIs and two home runs and also scored 4 runs.

== Background ==
This was the third World Series matchup between the Reds and Yankees (1939, 1961). The Yankees won the previous two meetings.

=== New York Yankees ===
After spending the last two years sharing home field with the New York Mets at Shea Stadium, the 1976 New York Yankees returned home to a massively renovated and modified Yankee Stadium. George Steinbrenner had now owned the team for four years, since 1973, with Billy Martin serving the first of his five stints as manager since 1975. General Manager Gabe Paul made numerous trades getting Mickey Rivers and Ed Figueroa from the Angels for Bobby Bonds; Willie Randolph and Dock Ellis from the Pirates for Doc Medich; and Doyle Alexander, Ken Holtzman, and Grant Jackson from the Orioles for Rudy May, Tippy Martinez, Scott McGregor, and Rick Dempsey.

The heart of the team was Yankee captain, Thurman Munson, whose grit and determination were factors in his winning the 1976 American League MVP award. Third baseman, Graig Nettles, and first baseman, Chris Chambliss were the key run producers, while speedy outfielders Roy White and Rivers set the table for the power hitters. Super free agent Catfish Hunter headed the staff while reliever Sparky Lyle led the A.L. in saves with 23. The Yankees won the AL East by 10 1/2 games over the Baltimore Orioles to clinch their first postseason appearance in twelve years. They defeated the Kansas City Royals in the deciding fifth game of the ALCS to win their first pennant in twelve years.

=== Cincinnati Reds ===
The defending champion Cincinnati Reds were piloted by Sparky Anderson who had a star-studded lineup led by second baseman Joe Morgan. Catcher Johnny Bench, first baseman Tony Perez, and outfielder George Foster provided enough power to drive in sparkplugs Pete Rose, Ken Griffey, and Morgan, who combined power (27 homers, 111 RBI) and speed (67 stolen bases) from the third-spot in the batting order. Morgan went on to win his second-straight National League Most Valuable Player award, outdistancing runner-up teammate Foster. Foster would go on to win the 1977 MVP award, giving the Reds six MVPs in an eight-year stretch. Bench won MVP honors in 1970 and 1972 while Rose took home the hardware in '73.

The Reds led the NL in every significant offensive category including runs scored, batting average, slugging percentage, on-base percentage, doubles, triples, home runs, RBI, and stolen bases.

The Reds won the NL West division by ten games over the Los Angeles Dodgers. In the postseason, they swept the Philadelphia Phillies in the NLCS after losing seven of twelve to them during the regular season.

== Summary ==
NL Cincinnati Reds (4) vs. AL New York Yankees (0)

Game	Date	Score	Location	Time	Attendance
1	October 16	New York Yankees – 1, Cincinnati Reds – 5	Riverfront Stadium	2:10	54,826
2	October 17	New York Yankees – 3, Cincinnati Reds – 4	Riverfront Stadium	2:33	54,816
3	October 19	Cincinnati Reds – 6, New York Yankees – 2	Yankee Stadium	2:40	56,667
4	October 21†	Cincinnati Reds – 7, New York Yankees – 2	Yankee Stadium	2:36	56,700

†: postponed from October 20 due to rain

== Matchups ==
=== Game 1 ===
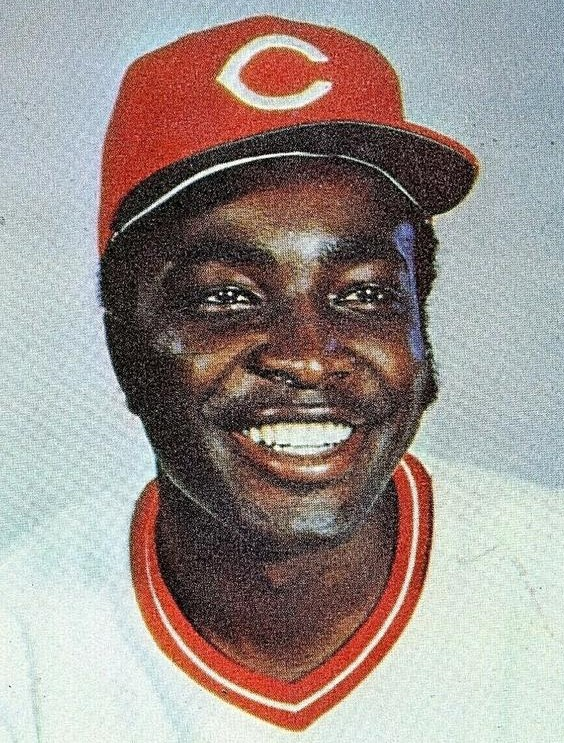
Joe Morgan

October 16, 1976 1:00 pm (ET) at Riverfront Stadium in Cincinnati, Ohio 51 °F (11 °C), cloudy
Team	1	2	3	4	5	6	7	8	9	R	H	E
New York	0	1	0	0	0	0	0	0	0	1	5	1
Cincinnati	1	0	1	0	0	1	2	0	X	5	10	1
WP: Don Gullett (1–0) LP: Doyle Alexander (0–1); Home runs: NYY: None; CIN: Joe Morgan (1)

Joe Morgan got the Reds off to a booming start with a home run in the first off of Doyle Alexander, who had to start because Catfish Hunter had a sore arm and needed another day of rest. The Yankees tied the game in the second when Lou Piniella hit a leadoff double, moved to third on a groundout and scored on Graig Nettles's sacrifice fly. In the third, Dave Concepcion tripled with one out and scored on Pete Rose's sacrifice fly to put the Reds up 2–1. Tony Pérez's RBI single in the sixth extended their lead to 3–1. In the seventh, George Foster hit a leadoff single and scored on a Johnny Bench RBI triple. Bench then scored on a Sparky Lyle wild pitch. The only bad news for the Reds was an injury to starting pitcher Don Gullett, who pulled a calf muscle in the eighth and would be unavailable for the remainder of the Series. It turned out to be Gullett's last appearance in a Reds uniform. Pedro Borbon pitched 1 2/3 shutout innings to close the game.

=== Game 2 ===
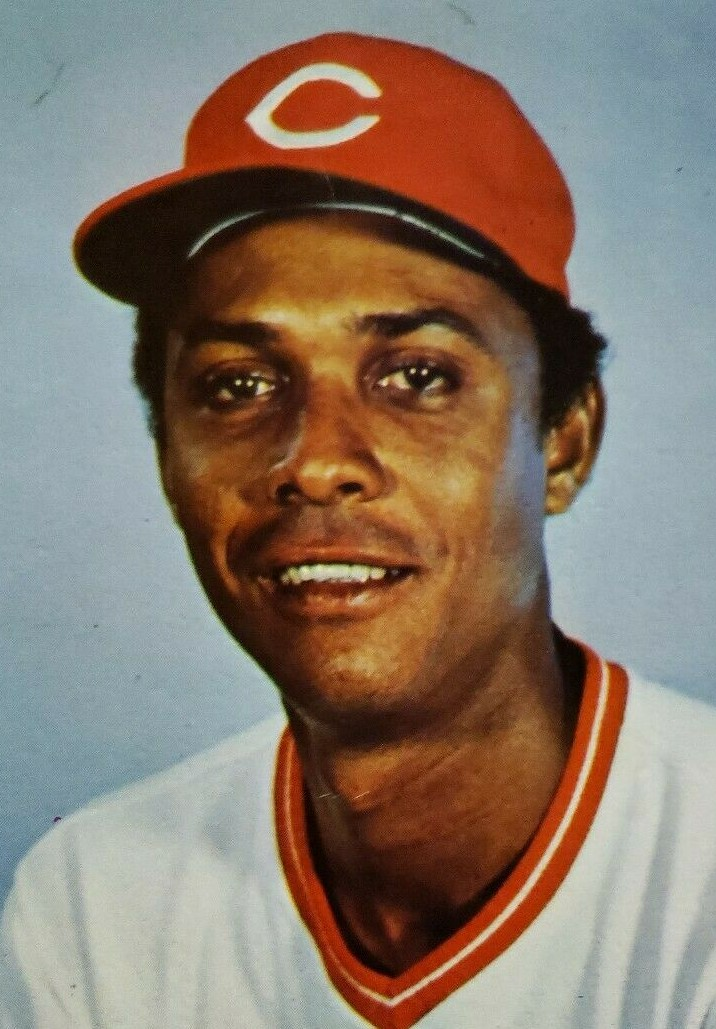
Tony Perez

October 17, 1976 8:30 pm (ET) at Riverfront Stadium in Cincinnati, Ohio 43 °F (6 °C), partly cloudy
Team	1	2	3	4	5	6	7	8	9	R	H	E
New York	0	0	0	1	0	0	2	0	0	3	9	1
Cincinnati	0	3	0	0	0	0	0	0	1	4	10	0
WP: Jack Billingham (1–0) LP: Catfish Hunter (0–1)

The Reds scored three runs in the second off Catfish Hunter. After a leadoff double by Dan Driessen, George Foster's RBI single put the Reds up 1–0. Foster was caught stealing second, but after a double and walk, Dave Concepción's RBI single made it 2–0 Reds. A walk loaded the bases before a sacrifice fly by Ken Griffey made it 3–0 Reds. The Yankees got on the board on an RBI single by Graig Nettles in the fourth. In the seventh, the Yankees tied things up on an RBI double by Fred Stanley off starter Fred Norman and an RBI groundout by Thurman Munson off Jack Billingham. Meanwhile, Hunter settled into a groove, pitching a complete game and shutting out the Reds until the ninth. With two outs, Ken Griffey reached second when Stanley threw wildly past first after fielding his slow bouncer. Joe Morgan was walked intentionally and Tony Pérez ended the game by driving in Griffey with a single.

The Sunday night contest, the first weekend World Series game to begin after dark, was played under temperatures that started at 43 °F (6 °C) and dipped into the 30s as the game progressed. Major League Baseball commissioner Bowie Kuhn responded to criticism of the scheduling, which was done to accommodate NBC television, by attending the game without wearing an overcoat in spite of the cold nighttime weather.

=== Game 3 ===
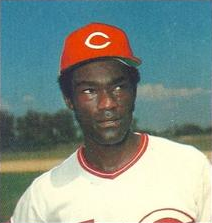
George Foster

October 19, 1976 8:30 pm (ET) at Yankee Stadium in Bronx, New York 48 °F (9 °C), overcast
Team	1	2	3	4	5	6	7	8	9	R	H	E
Cincinnati	0	3	0	1	0	0	0	2	0	6	13	2
New York	0	0	0	1	0	0	1	0	0	2	8	0
WP: Pat Zachry (1–0) LP: Dock Ellis (0–1) Sv: Will McEnaney (1); Home runs: CIN: Dan Driessen (1); NYY: Jim Mason (1)

In the first World Series game at the newly renovated Yankee Stadium, the Reds struck first with three runs off starter Dock Ellis. Dan Driessen hit a leadoff single, stole second and scored on an RBI double by George Foster, After Johnny Bench singled, an RBI force-out by César Gerónimo made it 2–0 Reds. Geronimo stole second and scored on an RBI single by Dave Concepción to cap the inning's scoring. Dan Driessen smacked a home run in the fourth. In the bottom of the inning, the Yankees got on the board on Oscar Gamble's single off of Pat Zachry. A seventh inning home run by Jim Mason—the 500th home run in the history of the World Series—cut the Reds' lead to 4–2. Mason became the first of two players to hit a home run in his only World Series at-bat, the second being Geoff Blum in 2005 for the Chicago White Sox. The Reds got both runs back in the eighth on Joe Morgan's RBI double off Grant Jackson after two leadoff singles and Foster's RBI single off Dick Tidrow.

This game featured a slick defensive play by Grant Jackson in the top of the seventh. Johnny Bench hit a hard grounder up the middle which appeared to be a sure base hit, but Jackson speared the ball with his glove behind his back and retired Bench.

This was the first World Series game at Yankee Stadium to open with opera star Robert Merrill's famous rendition of the National Anthem.

=== Game 4 ===
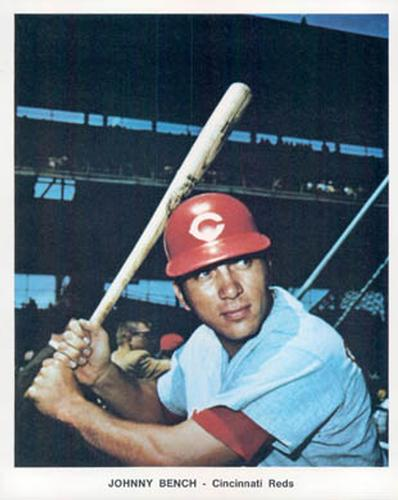
Johnny Bench

October 21, 1976 8:30 pm (ET) at Yankee Stadium in Bronx, New York 49 °F (9 °C), partly cloudy
Team	1	2	3	4	5	6	7	8	9	R	H	E
Cincinnati	0	0	0	3	0	0	0	0	4	7	9	2
New York	1	0	0	0	1	0	0	0	0	2	8	0
WP: Gary Nolan (1–0) LP: Ed Figueroa (0–1) Sv: Will McEnaney (2); Home runs: CIN: Johnny Bench 2 (2); NYY: None

The Yankees got on the board in the first (which would be their only lead in this Series) on a two-out Thurman Munson single and a Chris Chambliss double off of Gary Nolan. Munson would collect four hits in the game. In the fourth, Joe Morgan walked off of Ed Figueroa, stole second, and came home on a George Foster single. Johnny Bench followed with his first home run to give the Reds a 3–1 lead. The Yankees cut the lead to 3–2 in the fifth inning when Mickey Rivers hit a leadoff single, stole second and scored on Munson's single, but the Reds padded that lead in the ninth. Figueroa walked two before being relieved by Dick Tidrow, who allowed a one-out three-run home run to Bench to extend the Reds' lead to 6–2. César Gerónimo and Dave Concepción followed with consecutive doubles to make 7–2 Reds. Will McEnaney pitched 2 1/3 shutout innings to end the series. It was the Reds' second-straight World Series victory and the second-straight time McEnaney would be on the mound for the Series' final out. It also, to date, is the only perfect playoff season since the LCS was created in 1969. This was Tony Perez's final game in a Reds uniform until 1984. With the win, the Reds became the first visiting team since the 1957 Milwaukee Braves to win the World Series at Yankee Stadium.

== Composite line score ==
1976 World Series (4–0): Cincinnati Reds (N.L.) beat New York Yankees (A.L.).

Team	1	2	3	4	5	6	7	8	9	R	H	E
Cincinnati Reds	1	6	1	4	0	1	2	2	5	22	42	5
New York Yankees	1	1	0	2	1	0	3	0	0	8	30	2
Total attendance: 223,009 Average attendance: 55,752; Winning player's share: $26,367 Losing player's share: $19,935

== Broadcasting ==
This was the last of 30 consecutive World Series telecasts by NBC, which had aired the event since 1947; under Major League Baseball's new television contract, World Series coverage would now alternate between NBC (in even-numbered years) and rival network ABC (in odd-numbered years) each year; this arrangement would end after the 1989 World Series, and CBS would hold exclusive rights to MLB games for the next four years. (A similar setup occurred between 1996 and 2000, when World Series telecasts would alternate between NBC and Fox.) It was also the last time that local announcers for the participating teams (the Reds' Marty Brennaman and the Yankees' Phil Rizzuto, in this case) would be regularly featured on the network telecast.

This was the first of 21 consecutive World Series to be broadcast by CBS Radio.

== See also ==
- 1976 Japan Series
- List of World Series sweeps
