= Carlos May =

American baseball player (born 1948)

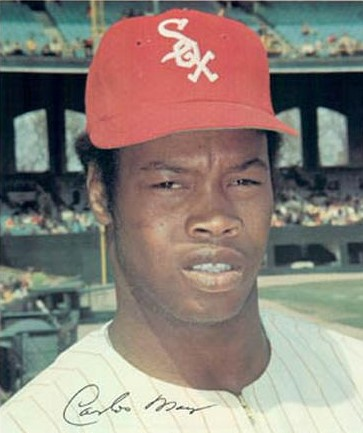
- Left fielder / Designated hitter / First baseman
- Born: May 17, 1948 (age 78); Birmingham, Alabama, U.S.
- Batted: Left Threw: Right

Professional debut
- MLB: September 6, 1968, for the Chicago White Sox
- NPB: 1978, for the Nankai Hawks

Last appearance
- MLB: October 2, 1977, for the California Angels
- NPB: 1981, for the Nankai Hawks

MLB statistics
- Batting average: .274
- Home runs: 90
- Runs batted in: 536

NPB statistics
- Batting average: .309
- Home runs: 70
- Runs batted in: 252
- Stats at Baseball Reference

Teams
- Chicago White Sox (1968–1976); New York Yankees (1976–1977); California Angels (1977); Nankai Hawks (1978–1981)

Career highlights and awards
- 2× All-Star (1969, 1972)

Carlos May (born May 17, 1948) is an American former professional baseball player. He played in Major League Baseball as an outfielder, first baseman and designated hitter from 1968 to 1977, most prominently for the Chicago White Sox where he was a two-time American League All-Star player. He also played for the New York Yankees and the California Angels. After his major league career, he played in the Nippon Professional Baseball league for the Nankai Hawks from 1978 to 1981. May is the younger brother of former professional baseball player, Lee May.

== Early years ==
May was born in Birmingham, Alabama on May 17, 1948. He attended A. H. Parker High School, playing outfield on the baseball team. In high school May had one season where his batting average was .735 on the baseball team, and he was an All-State fullback in football. May was a switch hitter and had a .352 batting average, before becoming a professional. He was selected by the Chicago White Sox in the first round of the 1966 major league draft (18th overall). His older brother Lee May also attended Parker and became a major league baseball player.

== Minor league career ==
May played in the White Sox minor league system from 1966-68. In 1967, playing Single-A baseball for the Appleton Foxes, May had a .338 batting average. The following year, again playing Single-A ball, this time for the Lynchburg White Sox, May hit .330 in 113 games, with 13 home runs, 74 runs batted in (RBI), 62 runs scored, and 68 bases on balls. He had the highest batting average in the Carolina League for anyone with over 300 at bats, and led the league in on-base percentage (.435).

== Major league career ==
=== Chicago White Sox ===
He began his major league career on September 6, 1968, starting in left field against the Baltimore Orioles. He played in a total of 17 games for the White Sox in 1968. In 1969, he played in 100 games, batting .281, with 18 home runs, 62 RBIs, 62 runs, 58 bases on balls, and an .873 on-base plus slugging (OPS). He was selected to the American League All-Star Team as a rookie, where he made a pinch-hitting appearance. His brother Lee was on the National League All Star Team in that game.

==== Military injury ====
May was in the U.S. Marine Reserves. On August 11, 1969, while serving at Camp Pendleton, he was asked to clean a mortar that still had a shell in it. The mortar fired, causing a partial amputation of May's right thumb. His season ended, and he was in medical care and physical therapy from August to January 1970. During his time recuperating in California, he also received considerable support through White Sox fans writing to him. May ultimately returned to play again, but the injury led May to change his entire hitting style. He never recovered the same home run power, but he may have become a better hitter in some ways.

May still won the 1969 Sporting News Rookie of the Year Award, but lost to Lou Piniella for the Major League Baseball Rookie of the Year Award (3rd in the voting). Playing in 135 games for Kansas City Royals, Piniella hit .282, with 11 home runs, 68 RBIs, 43 runs, 33 bases on balls, and a .741 OPS.

In 1970, as the White Sox' full-time left fielder, May hit .285 with 12 home runs and 68 RBIs in 150 games. However, the White Sox had a miserable year, finishing 50 games under .500 and in last place in the American League, 42 games out of first place. In 1971, he batted .294 with 70 RBIs while playing regularly at first base for the only time in his career. He moved back to the outfield after an offseason trade brought superstar and future Hall of Fame player Dick Allen to the White Sox in exchange for Tommy John and Steve Huntz.

Throughout the early 1970s, May continued to help the White Sox improve as a solid everyday starter for them. In 1972, he hit .308 and had 28 stolen bases, which would both end up his career-highs in the respective categories. That year, Chicago finished in 2nd place in the AL, behind only the Oakland Athletics. He was selected to the AL All-Star Team for a second time; and brother Lee May was selected for the NLteam again as well, as its starting first baseman.

In 1973 he collected 20 home runs and 96 RBIs, which would end up his career highs in those categories. In 1974, his batting average declined to .249, the lowest of his career as a full-time player; with only eight home runs and 58 RBIs. His raised his average to .271 the following year, but again only had eight home runs, with 53 RBIs.

=== New York Yankees ===
May did get a crack at postseason play, but not with the White Sox. On May 18, 1976, he was traded to the Yankees for pitcher Ken Brett and fellow outfielder Rich Coggins. The deal was made while the Yankees were in a heated pennant race (3.5 games ahead of the Orioles in first place); though they would win the Eastern Division by 10.5 games over the Orioles. That year, he hit .278 as a designated hitter for the Yankees, and the Yankees went to the World Series. During the ALCS, May went 2-for-10 with a double and a walk. In the World Series against the Cincinnati Reds, he did not get a hit in 9 at bats and ended up with a .105 batting average in the postseason; the Reds sweeping the Yankees, 4–0.

=== Legacy ===
He was an All-Star in 1969 and 1972, and made the top 10 in batting average and stolen bases twice. May is the younger brother of Lee May, who played in the major leagues for eighteen seasons. In 1969, they were the first brothers to play against each other in the All Star Game, with Carlos representing the American League (AL) and Lee representing the National League (NL).

While playing for the White Sox he had the rare distinction of wearing his birthday on the back of his uniform, including his surname: "MAY 17." He is the only player in MLB history to wear his birthday on the back of his jersey by wearing No.17, which including the name reads as "May 17", when he began his Major League career in the White Sox.

In a 10-year career, he hit .274 with 90 home runs and 536 RBIs in 1165 games. He had 85 career stolen bases and 545 runs scored. In 4120 at bats, he had 1127 career hits.

=== Japanese Pacific League ===
From 1978-81, May played four years of professional baseball in the Japan Pacific League, for the Nankai Hawks. Over that time, he had a .309 batting average, hitting 27 home runs in 1980 and 26 in 1979. His teammates included former major league player Bobby Tolan, who had played with Lee May on the Reds. He was claimed by the White Sox in 1978, but he did not want to return.

=== Coaching ===
In 2012, May joined the coaching staff of the Schaumburg Boomers baseball team, in the Frontier League.

== Personal life ==
May worked for the United States Postal Service for 20 years as a mail carrier and clerk after playing baseball. He is currently a community relations representative for the White Sox.
