= Maryanne Ellison Simmons =

Maryanne Ellison Simmons (born July 16, 1949, in Ann Arbor, Michigan) is an artist, writer, and the wife of baseball player Ted Simmons. She studied fine art and received her bachelor's degree from the University of Michigan in 1971 and her master's degree from Washington University in St. Louis in 1992. In May 1982 she started the quarterly magazine The Waiting Room intended for the wives of professional baseball players. She was an instructor in printmaking at Washington University from 1992 to 1996. In 1996 she founded Wildwood Press. From 1996 to 2002 she was the co-director of Island Press.
