= Paul Splittorff =

American baseball player (1946–2011)

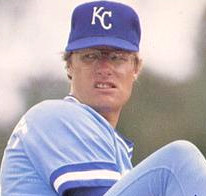
- Splittorff in 1980
- Pitcher
- Born: October 8, 1946; Evansville, Indiana, U.S.
- Died: May 25, 2011 (aged 64); Blue Springs, Missouri, U.S.
- Batted: Left Threw: Left

MLB debut
- September 23, 1970, for the Kansas City Royals

Last MLB appearance
- June 26, 1984, for the Kansas City Royals

MLB statistics
- Win–loss record: 166–143
- Earned run average: 3.81
- Strikeouts: 1,057
- Stats at Baseball Reference

Teams
- Kansas City Royals (1970–1984)

Career highlights and awards
- Kansas City Royals Hall of Fame
Medals
Men's baseball
Representing United States
Pan American Games
Gold medal – first place	1967 Winnipeg	Team

Paul William Splittorff Jr. (/ˈsplɪtɔːrf/ SPLIT-orf; October 8, 1946 – May 25, 2011) was an American professional baseball player and television sports commentator. He played his entire career in Major League Baseball as a left-handed pitcher for the Kansas City Royals from 1970 to 1984. After his playing career, Splittorff became a television color commentator for the Royals. He was inducted into the Royals Hall of Fame in 1987.

== Early years ==
Splittorff was born in Evansville, Indiana and grew up mostly in Arlington Heights, Illinois. Arlington High School produced several major league baseball players, including Fritz Peterson, Dick Bokelmann, and George Vukovich.

Peterson and Splittorff pitched against each other twice during their careers, with Peterson winning both matchups. On August 17, 1971, the Yankees beat the Kansas City Royals 2–0 at Yankee Stadium (in the days before the designated hitter, both pitchers went 0–2 at the plate), and on August 22, 1975, at the old Royals Stadium, the Indians beat the Royals, 9–5.

He was drafted by the Royals in the 25th round of the 1968 Major League Baseball draft out of Morningside College in Sioux City, Iowa, where he was a member of Delta Sigma Phi fraternity and also played basketball. He pitched for the Corning Royals in 1968 (a year before the major league club existed), and has the distinction of throwing the first pitch in Royals organization history. He went 28–27 with a 4.01 earned run average in three seasons in the Royals' farm system before receiving his first call to the majors in September 1970. He took the loss in his major league debut, pitching seven innings and giving up three earned runs against the Chicago White Sox.

== Kansas City Royals ==
Splittorff began the 1971 season with the Omaha Royals, but after going 5–2 with a 1.48 ERA in eight starts for Omaha, he earned a second promotion to the majors. He stayed with Kansas City for the rest of the season, going 8–9 with a 2.68 ERA.

From there, he became a fixture in the Kansas City rotation. He enjoyed his only 20-win season in 1973, when he went 20–11 with a 3.98 ERA. Splittorff was the starting pitcher in the inaugural game at Kauffman Stadium (known at the time as Royals Stadium) on April 10, 1973; Splittorff earned the victory that evening in a 12–1 rout of the Texas Rangers. After finishing second to the Oakland Athletics three of his first five seasons in the majors, Splittorff and the Royals emerged as American League West champions in 1976.

Kansas City faced the New York Yankees in every American League Championship Series from 1976 to 1978, with the Yankees emerging victorious in all three. For his part, Splittorff was 2–0 with a 2.84 ERA against the Yankees in the five appearances he made against them in the ALCS. After both teams missed the playoffs in 1979, the Royals and Yankees resumed their postseason rivalry in the 1980 American League Championship Series. Kansas City swept the series, with Splittorff starting the third and deciding game, and receiving a no-decision. The Royals lost the World Series in six games to the Philadelphia Phillies with Splittorff making his only appearance in game six.

Never an All-Star and usually overshadowed by teammates Steve Busby, Dennis Leonard and Larry Gura, Splittorff's consistency and longevity resulted in his winning more games than any of them. Splittorff accumulated 166 career victories over a 15-year career with the Royals. Primarily a starter, Splittorff did pick up one save during his career. On July 22, 1975, in the first game of a doubleheader, he saved a 3–2 Royals victory over the Brewers. Splittorff pitched 1 2/3 scoreless innings to hold down the victory for Steve Busby.

Splittorff retired when his effectiveness faded. At the same time, the Royals had numerous young pitchers coming through the ranks. His final game was on June 26, 1984.

== Personal life ==
After his retirement, Splittorff became a television color commentator for the Royals. He was inducted into the Royals Hall of Fame in 1987. He also worked as an analyst for Big Eight and Big 12 college basketball telecasts.

On May 16, 2011, Splittorff's battle with oral cancer and melanoma became public. Nine days later, on the morning of May 25, he died in his Blue Springs, Missouri, home at the age of 64.

== See also ==
- List of Major League Baseball players who spent their entire career with one franchise
