= Mark Littell =

American baseball player (1953–2022)

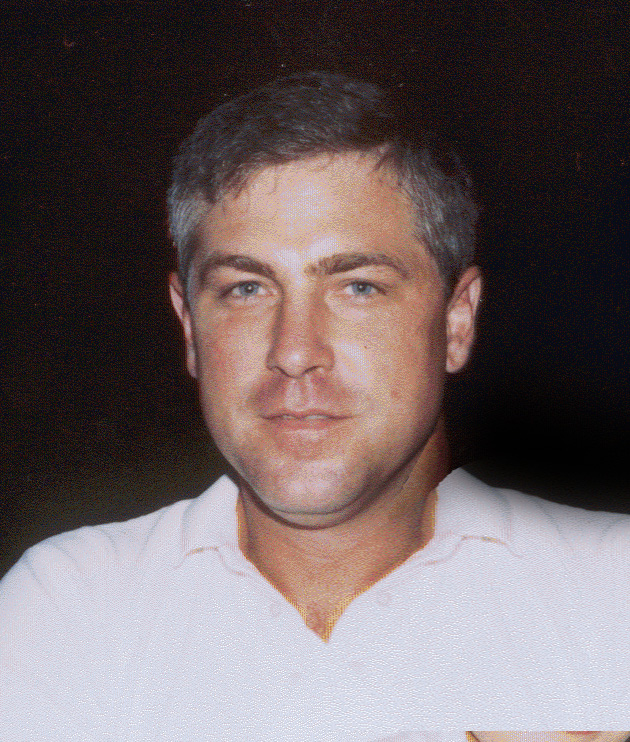
- Pitcher
- Born: January 17, 1953; Cape Girardeau, Missouri, U.S.
- Died: September 5, 2022 (aged 69); St. Louis, Missouri, U.S.
- Batted: Left Threw: Right

MLB debut
- June 14, 1973, for the Kansas City Royals

Last MLB appearance
- June 24, 1982, for the St. Louis Cardinals

MLB statistics
- Win–loss record: 32–31
- Earned run average: 3.32
- Strikeouts: 466
- Saves: 56
- Stats at Baseball Reference

Teams
- Kansas City Royals (1973, 1975–1977); St. Louis Cardinals (1978–1982)

Mark Alan Littell (/lɪˈtɛl/ lih-TEL; January 17, 1953 – September 5, 2022), nicknamed "Country" and "Ramrod", was an American relief pitcher in Major League Baseball in 1973 and from 1975 to 1982 for the Kansas City Royals and St. Louis Cardinals. He was a member of the Royals' division champions in 1976 and 1977, leading the 1976 team with 16 saves. Littell had a career earned run average (ERA) of 3.32 and saved 56 games from 1976 to 1981. Bone spurs in his elbow cut his career short, forcing him to retire midway through the 1982 season at the age of 29, before the Cardinals went on to win the World Series. After his playing career, he coached in the minor leagues and in college baseball.

== Early life and career ==
Littell was raised on an 800-acre (320 ha) farm that grew cotton and soybean near Wardell, Missouri. He attended Gideon High School in Gideon, Missouri, and played for the school's baseball team as a pitcher. He threw three no-hitters in his senior year. He had a 7–3 win–loss record, a 0.97 ERA, and 127 strikeouts in 69 2/3 innings pitched in his senior year. He graduated with a 0.98 ERA in his high school career. After he graduated, Littell played American Legion Baseball, representing Blytheville, Arkansas, and recorded 24 strikeouts in his first American Legion game.

== Professional career ==
The Kansas City Royals selected Littell in the 12th round of the 1971 MLB draft. Though he had committed to play college baseball for the University of Missouri, he signed with the Royals instead. Littell pitched for the Billings Mustangs of the Rookie-level Pioneer League in 1971 after he signed and for the Waterloo Royals of the Class A Midwest League in 1972. He opened the 1973 season with the Omaha Royals of the American Association, and made his major league debut as a starting pitcher on June 14, 1973. Spending much of the season with Omaha, he was named the league's pitcher of the year in 1973.

Littell spent the 1974 season in the minor leagues before returning to the major leagues in 1975. In May 1976, Royals manager Whitey Herzog named Littell his closer. That year, he had a 2.08 ERA with 16 saves, as the Royals won the American League West division. Littell allowed a walk-off home run to New York Yankees first baseman Chris Chambliss to end the 1976 American League Championship Series. He had only allowed one home run during the regular season. Littell had 12 saves in 1977, and also was a starting pitcher for five games, as the Royals again won the division and lost the AL Championship Series to the Yankees.

Littell was traded along with Buck Martinez to the St. Louis Cardinals for Al Hrabosky during the Winter Meetings on December 8, 1977. He saved 13 games in 1979 and had a 2.53 ERA in his first two seasons as a Cardinal, but suffered an arm injury that limited his effectiveness afterwards. He began the 1980 and 1981 seasons on the disabled list as he required surgery during both seasons to remove bone spurs from his elbow. On August 10, 1981, Pete Rose recorded his 3,631st hit off Littell to become the National League's all-time hits leader. Littell was a member of the Cardinals during their 1982 championship season; however, the club designated Littell for assignment in June. He accepted an assignment to the Louisville Bats. In July, Littell went on the disabled list with an elbow injury.

Littell retired after the 1982 season with a 32–31 win–loss record, a 3.32 ERA, and 56 saves.

== Coaching career ==
Littell served as a coach in the minor leagues after his playing career. He became the pitching coach the Waterloo Diamonds, a Baltimore Orioles affiliate in the Midwest League in 1989. He joined the San Diego Padres organization and served as the pitching coach for the Charleston Rainbows of the Class A South Atlantic League for the 1990 season and the High Desert Mavericks of the Class A-Advanced California League in 1991. The Padres fired Littell in September 1991.

After the 1991 season, the Milwaukee Brewers hired Littell as the pitching coach of the Stockton Ports of the California League. He coached for Stockton through the 1994 season. In the 1993–94 Australian Baseball League season, he coached for the Brisbane Bandits. With Stockton in August 1994, the team had three games go into extra innings in a week, and Littell was activated to help the overworked pitching staff, pitching an inning in a game 12 years after his retirement as a player. He was the pitching coach for the New Orleans Zephyrs in 1996 and for the Tucson Toros in 1997. He coached the Ogden Raptors in 2001 and 2002 and coached for the Helena Brewers from 2003 to 2006. He was an assistant coach for the college baseball team of Dickinson State University in 2012.

== Later life ==
Littell attended Union University and the University of Tampa. He wrote three books centered on his professional career in baseball as a player and coach; On the 8th day, God Made Baseball, What's Up Ramrod, and Country Boy: Conveniently Wild. He also invented his own version of the athletic cup, which was anatomically correct. Called the "Nutty Buddy", Littell posted a video on YouTube of himself testing the cup by wearing it while getting hit in the groin by a pitching machine. He was inducted into the Missouri Sports Hall of Fame in 2016.

Littell married Marsha (née Carver) in December 1975. In 1982, Marsha co-authored a 28-page magazine with Maryanne Simmons, the wife of Ted Simmons, called The Waiting Room, about being the partner of a professional athlete.

On September 5, 2022, Mark Littell died as the result of complications after heart surgery.

== Books ==
- Littell, Mark (2017). On the 8th day, God Made Baseball. Seattle: CreateSpace. ISBN 9781544187259. OCLC 1321925595.
- ——; Jerry Caulder (2018). What's Up Ramrod. Phoenix, AZ: Mark Littell. ISBN 9781981249657. OCLC 1042169439.
- Flannigan, Charlie; —— (2021). Country Boy: Conveniently Wild. Book Marketeers. ISBN 9798415967971. OCLC 1340975240.
