= Jim Wohlford =

American baseball player (born 1951)

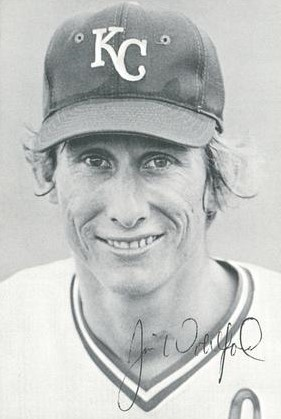
- Outfielder
- Born: February 28, 1951 (age 75); Visalia, California, U.S.
- Batted: Right Threw: Right

MLB debut
- September 1, 1972, for the Kansas City Royals

Last MLB appearance
- October 5, 1986, for the Montreal Expos

MLB statistics
- Batting average: .260
- Home runs: 21
- Runs batted in: 305
- Stats at Baseball Reference

Teams
- Kansas City Royals (1972–1976); Milwaukee Brewers (1977–1979); San Francisco Giants (1980–1982); Montreal Expos (1983–1986)

James Eugene Wohlford (born February 28, 1951) is an American former professional baseball player. He played in Major League Baseball (MLB) as an outfielder from 1972 to 1986 for the Kansas City Royals, Milwaukee Brewers, San Francisco Giants, and the Montreal Expos.

== Baseball career ==
Wohlford spent most of his career as a reserve outfielder, typically in left field. He was often used as a defensive replacement due to his fielding skills. With the 1974 Kansas City Royals, he had a batting average of .271. 1974 was the only year Wohlford ever had more than 500 at bats. He had a .260 career batting average.

He signed a five-year free agent contract with the San Francisco Giants on December 12, 1979.

During his Major League career, he became notable for saying the line, "Ninety percent of this game is half-mental."

== Post-playing career ==
After his playing career ended, Wohlford has worked as a financial planner in Visalia, California.

== Sources ==
- Career statistics from Baseball Reference · Baseball Reference (Minors) · Retrosheet · Baseball Almanac
