= Steve Mingori =

American baseball player (1944–2008)

- Pitcher
- Born: February 29, 1944; Kansas City, Missouri, U.S.
- Died: July 10, 2008 (aged 64); Liberty, Missouri, U.S.
- Batted: Left Threw: Left

MLB debut
- August 5, 1970, for the Cleveland Indians

Last MLB appearance
- September 2, 1979, for the Kansas City Royals

MLB statistics
- Win–loss record: 18–33
- Earned run average: 3.03
- Strikeouts: 329
- Stats at Baseball Reference

Teams
- Cleveland Indians (1970–1973); Kansas City Royals (1973–1979)

Steven Bernard Mingori (/mɪnˈɡɔːri/ min-GOR-ee; February 29, 1944 – July 10, 2008) was an American left-handed relief pitcher in Major League Baseball who played for the Cleveland Indians (1970–1973) and Kansas City Royals (1973–1979).

He was born in Kansas City, Missouri, and went to Rockhurst High School. He played college baseball at University of Missouri–Kansas City and Pittsburg State University. Mingori was signed by the Cincinnati Reds in 1965, and spent the next five years in the Reds' minor league system. Before the 1970 season began, the Reds traded Mingori to the Cleveland Indians for Jay Ward.

Mingori made his major league debut on August 5, 1970, and finished the season with a 1–0 win–loss record and a 2.66 earned run average (ERA) in 21 games. The following season, Mingori pitched in 47 games until he suffered a broken jaw in an early August game, causing him to miss nearly the rest of the season. He ended the year with a 1–2 record and a 1.43 ERA in 54 appearances. He spent another season and a half with the Indians, then was traded to the Kansas City Royals on June 8, 1973, for Mike Jackson; the Royals had been particularly interested in acquiring Mingori since he was a Kansas City native. Mingori had 36 appearances in both 1974 and 1975, and had ERAs of 2.81 and 2.50. He followed that up with a 5–5 record and 2.32 ERA in 55 appearances in 1976. He played in at least 30 games for his final three seasons. After his final game on September 2, 1979, he was released by the Royals and retired after the season.

In a ten-season career, Mingori posted a won-loss record of 18–33 with a 3.03 earned run average and 42 saves in 385 games pitched, all but two of which came as a reliever. Mingori died on July 10, 2008, in his hometown of Liberty, Missouri, of natural causes.
