= Larry Gura =

American baseball player (born 1947)

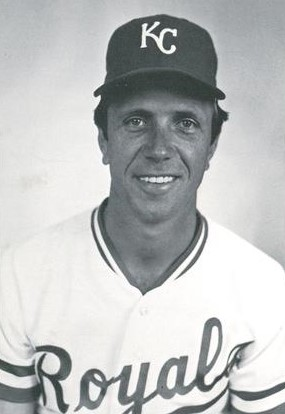
- Pitcher
- Born: November 26, 1947 (age 77); Joliet, Illinois, U.S.
- Batted: Switch Threw: Left

MLB debut
- April 30, 1970, for the Chicago Cubs

Last MLB appearance
- July 27, 1985, for the Chicago Cubs

MLB statistics
- Win–loss record: 126–97
- Earned run average: 3.76
- Strikeouts: 801

Teams
- Chicago Cubs (1970–1973); New York Yankees (1974–1975); Kansas City Royals (1976–1985); Chicago Cubs (1985)

Career highlights and awards
- All-Star (1980); Kansas City Royals Hall of Fame
Medals
International Amateur Tournament
Gold medal – first place	1968 Mexico City	Team

Lawrence Cyril Gura (/ˈɡʌrə/; born November 26, 1947) is an American former left-handed pitcher in Major League Baseball from 1970 to 1985. He won a national championship at Arizona State University and spent 16 years in the Major Leagues. He played for the Chicago Cubs (1970–1973, 1985) of the National League, and the New York Yankees (1974–1975) and Kansas City Royals (1976–1985), both of the American League. He attended Joliet East High School and was inducted into the inaugural Joliet Hall of Fame in Joliet, Illinois.

He was elected to the American League All-Star team in 1980 when he had his finest season, finishing with an 18–10 record and a 2.95 ERA. Gura won in double figures for seven consecutive seasons for the Royals (1978–1984) compiling 99 wins over that span. He particularly pestered his former team, the Yankees, against whom he went 11–6 in the regular season as a Royal. Gura was 3–0 against them in both 1979 and 1980, with five complete games, and tossed another complete-game victory against the Yankees in the 1980 American League Championship Series.

Gura was named Royals pitcher of the year two times.

Gura was the Royals' starting pitcher for Games 2 and 5 of the 1980 World Series.

He finished with a 126–97 career record, 14 saves, 16 shutouts, and an earned run average of 3.76. Gura was also an exceptional fielding pitcher, committing only 7 errors in 483 total chances for a career .986 fielding percentage.

He won 18 games in a season twice including the 1980 season. He ranks in the Royals all-time top 10 in games started (219), innings pitched (1,701.1) and though not a dominant strikeout artist, he still struck out 633 batters in a Royal uniform.

== Highlights ==
- led the American Association with a .733 winning percentage while playing for the Wichita Aeros in 1972
- led the International League with a 2.14 ERA while playing for the Syracuse Chiefs in 1974
- led the American League in batters faced (1,175) in 1980
- Was named AL Pitcher of the Month for the months of July 1980 and September 1981.
