= 1981 Oakland Athletics season =

1981 Oakland Athletics
- American League West champions
- League: American League
- Division: West
- Ballpark: Oakland–Alameda County Coliseum
- City: Oakland, California
- Record: 64–45 (.587)
- Divisional place: 1st
- Owners: Walter A. Haas, Jr.
- General managers: Billy Martin
- Managers: Billy Martin
- Television: KPIX-TV (Bill King, Harmon Killebrew)
- Radio: KSFO (Bill King, Lon Simmons, Wayne Hagin); KIQI (Amaury Pi-Gonzalez, Julio Gonzalez)

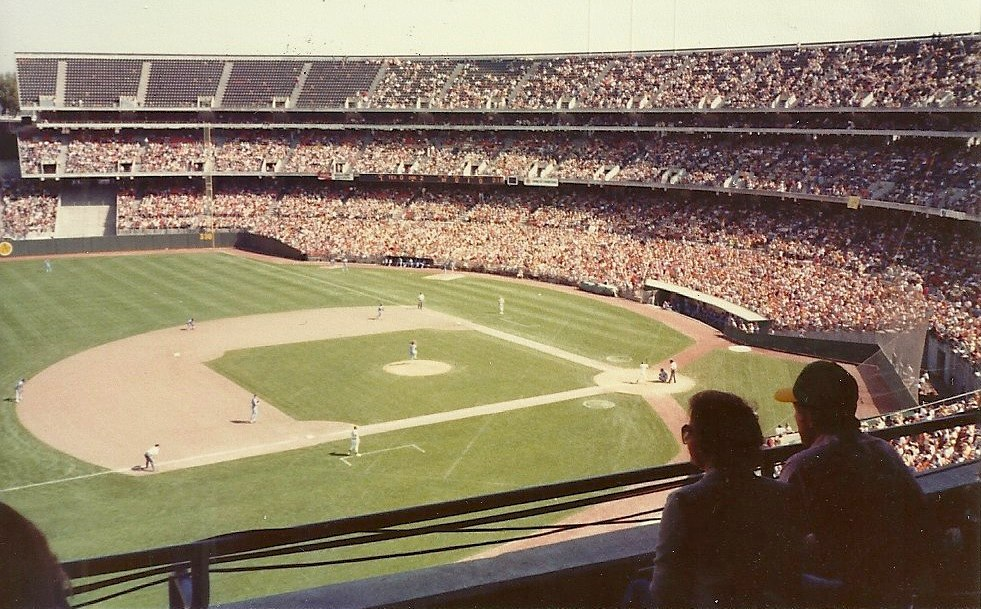
The Oakland Athletics playing host to the Texas Rangers at the Oakland–Alameda County Coliseum during a 1981 home game.

The 1981 Oakland Athletics season was the 81st season for the Oakland Athletics franchise, all as members of the American League, and their 14th season in Oakland. The Athletics finished with an overall record of 64 wins and 45 losses. They finished the season with the best record in the American League (and second best in all of baseball; the Cincinnati Reds had the best record in the majors that year going 66-42 but missed the playoffs). Due to the infamous 1981 players strike, the league resorted to a split-season format; this new format saw the winners of both halves of the season playing in the first divisional playoff in MLB history. The A's qualified by posting the American League West's best record in the first half of the season. While they swept the Kansas City Royals in the ALDS, they were themselves swept by the New York Yankees in the ALCS.

The Athletics' 1981 season ranks among the organization's most interesting. The A's, only two years removed from a disastrous 54–108 finish, won their first AL West crown since 1975 under second-year manager Billy Martin. The "Billyball" A's began the season with a then-AL record 11 consecutive wins (this record was later broken by the 1987 Milwaukee Brewers, who raced out to a 13–0 start). The squad followed its first loss of the season, a tough 3–2 loss to the Seattle Mariners, with six more victories. Their 17-1 start (through 18 games) remains unmatched. The A's starting rotation (consisting of Rick Langford, Matt Keough, Steve McCatty, Mike Norris, and Brian Kingman) received national attention during the torrid start; the unit was collectively featured on the cover of Sports Illustrated's April 27, 1981, edition. The periodic heroics of Tony Armas and Rickey Henderson also drew notice.

The Athletics, however, slumped badly following the 17–1 start. While they regained some of their swagger during the season's second half, they ultimately played .500 baseball for the rest of the season. Even still, the A's won the AL West's first half with a 37–23 mark; they also led the division in total wins despite losing the second half to the Royals. The A's swept the Royals in the ALDS 3–0. The A's themselves were humbled in the ALCS, as the Yankees outscored Oakland 20–4 in a humiliating three-game rout. The 1981 ALCS is perhaps best remembered as the purported birthplace of "the wave"; while the phenomenon's origin is disputed, it is most commonly attributed to Krazy George Henderson, who introduced it to the Athletics' crowd during the series' final game.

Despite high expectations, the A's collapsed in 1982. A rash of injuries, among other factors, saw the team plummet to an abysmal 68-94 record. The firing of Billy Martin at seasons' end brought a swift and unceremonious end to the "Billyball" era. All told, the A's would have to wait until 1988 for their next postseason appearance. Only one member of the 1981 team (Rich Bordi) also played on the 1988 team.

== Offseason ==
- October 23, 1980: Randy Elliott was released by the Athletics.
- December 8, 1980: Brian Doyle was drafted by the Athletics from the New York Yankees in the 1980 rule 5 draft.
- December 9, 1980: DeWayne Buice was drafted by the Oakland Athletics from the San Francisco Giants in the 1980 minor league draft.
- December 11, 1980: Michael King (minors) was traded by the Athletics to the Chicago Cubs for Cliff Johnson and Keith Drumright.
- January 13, 1981: Steve Kiefer was drafted by the Athletics in the 1st round of the 1981 Major League Baseball draft.
- February 10, 1981: The Athletics traded a player to be named later to the Houston Astros for Jimmy Sexton. The Athletics completed the trade by sending Rick Lysander to the Astros on October 20.
- March 27, 1981: Bob Lacey and Roy Moretti (minors) were traded by the Athletics to the San Diego Padres for Kevin Bell, Tony Phillips and Eric Mustad (minors).
- March 30, 1981: Alan Wirth was released by the Athletics.

=== Ownership ===
Athletics owner Charlie O. Finley's wife sought a divorce and would not accept part of a baseball team in a property settlement. With most of his money tied up in the A's or his insurance empire, Finley had to sell the team. Though Finley found a buyer in businessman Marvin Davis, who would have moved the Athletics to Denver, the tentative deal hit a snag when the Raiders announced their move to Los Angeles. Oakland and Alameda County officials, not wanting to be held responsible for losing Oakland's status as a big-league city in its own right, refused to let Finley break the lease with the Coliseum. Finley then looked to local buyers, selling the A's to San Francisco clothing manufacturer Walter A. Haas, Jr., president of Levi Strauss & Co. prior to the 1981 season.

Haas restored the official name of the club to "Athletics" in 1981, but retained the nickname "A's" for marketing purposes. At first, the word "Athletics" was restored only to the club's logo, underneath the much larger stylized-"A" that had come to represent the team since the early days. Former owner Charlie Finley banned the word "Athletics" from the club's name because he felt that name was too closely associated with former Philadelphia Athletics owner Connie Mack.

During the Finley era, average home attendance from 1968–1980 was 777,000 per season, with 1,075,518 in 1975 being the highest attendance for a Finley-owned team. In marked contrast, during the first year of Haas' ownership, the Athletics drew 1,304,052—in a season shortened by a player strike. Were it not for the strike, the A's were on a pace to draw over 2.2 million in 1981. The A's finished with the second-best overall record in baseball, and the best record in the American League.

== Spring training ==
The Oakland Athletics held spring training at Rendezvous Park in Mesa, Arizona.

== Regular season ==
- April 19, 1981: In the first game of a doubleheader with the Seattle Mariners, the A's won 6-1 to win their then-record 11th consecutive game to start a season.
- April 25, 1981: Prior to a game against the Seattle Mariners, Seattle manager Maury Wills advised the Kingdome groundskeepers to enlarge the batter's box by a foot. A's manager Billy Martin noticed. Martin showed umpire Bill Kunkel that the batter's box was seven feet long instead of six feet. Martin felt that batters being able to move up a foot in the box could cut at pitches before a curveball broke. Wills was suspended for two games and fined $500.

=== Game log ===
==== First half ====
1981 Regular Season Game Log First Half (37–23) (Home: 22–11; Road: 15–12)
April (18–3) (Home: 7–3; Road: 11–0)

#	Date	Opponent	Score	Win	Loss	Save	Attendance	Record	Report
1	April 9	@ Twins							
2	April 10	@ Twins							
3	April 11	@ Twins							
4	April 12	@ Twins							
5	April 13	@ Angels							
6	April 14	@ Angels							
7	April 15	@ Angels							
8	April 16	@ Angels							
9	April 17	Mariners							
10	April 18	Mariners							
11	April 19	Mariners							
12	April 19	Mariners							
13	April 20	Twins							
14	April 21	Twins							
15	April 22	Twins							
16	April 24	@ Mariners							
17	April 25	@ Mariners							
18	April 26	@ Mariners							
19	April 27	Angels							
20	April 28	Angels							
21	April 29	Angels							

May (13–17) (Home: 11–6; Road: 2–11)

#	Date	Opponent	Score	Win	Loss	Save	Attendance	Record	Report
22	May 1	Yankees							
23	May 2	Yankees							
24	May 3	Yankees							
25	May 3	Yankees							
26	May 5	Tigers							
27	May 6	Tigers							
28	May 7	Tigers							
29	May 8	Brewers							
30	May 9	Brewers							
31	May 10	Brewers							
32	May 12	@ Yankees							
33	May 13	@ Yankees							
34	May 14	@ Yankees							
35	May 15	@ Brewers							
36	May 16	@ Brewers							
37	May 17	@ Brewers							
38	May 18	@ Orioles							
39	May 19	@ Orioles							
40	May 20	@ Red Sox							
41	May 21	@ Red Sox							
42	May 22	Blue Jays							
43	May 23	Blue Jays							
44	May 24	Blue Jays							
45	May 24	Blue Jays							
46	May 25	White Sox							
47	May 26	White Sox							
48	May 27	White Sox							
49	May 29	@ Blue Jays							
50	May 30	@ Blue Jays							
51	May 31	@ Blue Jays							

June (6–3) (Home: 4–2; Road: 2–1)

#	Date	Opponent	Score	Win	Loss	Save	Attendance	Record	Report
52	June 2	@ White Sox							
53	June 3	@ White Sox							
54	June 4	@ White Sox							
55	June 5	Red Sox							
56	June 6	Red Sox							
57	June 7	Red Sox							
58	June 9	Orioles							
59	June 9	Orioles							
60	June 10	Orioles							

==== Second half ====
1981 Regular Season Game Log Second Half (27–22) (Home: 12–11; Road: 15–12)
August (10–9) (Home: 7–4; Road: 3–5)

#	Date	Opponent	Score	Win	Loss	Save	Attendance	Record	Report
All-Star Break: NL def. AL at Cleveland Stadium, 5–4
61	August 10	@ Twins							
62	August 11	@ Twins							
63	August 12	@ Twins							
64	August 14	Angels							
65	August 15	Angels							
66	August 16	Angels							
67	August 18	Red Sox							
68	August 19	Red Sox							
69	August 20	Red Sox							
70	August 21	Orioles							
71	August 22	Orioles							
72	August 23	Orioles							
73	August 24	Indians							
74	August 25	Indians							
75	August 27	@ Red Sox							
76	August 28	@ Red Sox							
77	August 29	@ Red Sox							
78	August 30	@ Red Sox							
79	August 31	@ Indians							

September (15–12) (Home: 5–6; Road: 10–6)

#	Date	Opponent	Score	Win	Loss	Save	Attendance	Record	Report
80	September 2	@ Indians							
81	September 2	@ Indians							
82	September 3	@ Orioles							
83	September 4	@ Orioles							
84	September 5	@ Orioles							
85	September 6	@ Orioles							
86	September 7	Rangers							
87	September 8	Rangers							
88	September 9	Rangers							
89	September 11	Royals							
90	September 12	Royals							
91	September 13	Royals							
92	September 14	@ Rangers							
93	September 15	@ Rangers							
94	September 16	@ Rangers							
95	September 18	@ White Sox							
96	September 19	@ White Sox							
97	September 20	@ White Sox							
98	September 22	@ Blue Jays							
99	September 22	@ Blue Jays							
100	September 23	@ Blue Jays							
101	September 25	White Sox							
102	September 26	White Sox							
103	September 27	White Sox							
104	September 27	White Sox							
105	September 29	Blue Jays							
106	September 30	Blue Jays							

October (2–1) (Road: 2–1)

#	Date	Opponent	Score	Win	Loss	Save	Attendance	Record	Report
107	October 2	@ Royals							
108	October 3	@ Royals							
109	October 4	@ Royals							

Legend
Athletics win	Athletics loss	All-Star Game	Game postponed

=== Season standings ===
AL West
Team	W	L	Pct.	GB	Home	Road
Oakland Athletics	64	45	.587	—	35‍–‍21	29‍–‍24
Texas Rangers	57	48	.543	5	32‍–‍24	25‍–‍24
Chicago White Sox	54	52	.509	8½	25‍–‍24	29‍–‍28
Kansas City Royals	50	53	.485	11	19‍–‍28	31‍–‍25
California Angels	51	59	.464	13½	26‍–‍28	25‍–‍31
Seattle Mariners	44	65	.404	20	20‍–‍37	24‍–‍28
Minnesota Twins	41	68	.376	23	24‍–‍36	17‍–‍32

AL West First Half Standings	W	L	Pct.	GB
Oakland Athletics	37	23	.617	—
Texas Rangers	33	22	.600	1 1/2
Chicago White Sox	31	22	.585	2 1/2
California Angels	31	29	.517	6
Kansas City Royals	20	30	.400	12
Seattle Mariners	21	36	.368	14 1/2
Minnesota Twins	17	39	.304	18

AL West Second Half Standings	W	L	Pct.	GB
Kansas City Royals	30	23	.566	—
Oakland Athletics	27	22	.551	1
Texas Rangers	24	26	.480	4 1/2
Minnesota Twins	24	29	.453	6
Seattle Mariners	23	29	.442	6 1/2
Chicago White Sox	23	30	.434	7
California Angels	20	30	.400	8 1/2

=== Record vs. opponents ===
1981 American League record Sources:
Team	BAL	BOS	CAL	CWS	CLE	DET	KC	MIL	MIN	NYY	OAK	SEA	TEX	TOR
Baltimore	—	2–2	6–6	3–6	4–2	6–7	5–3	2–4	6–0	7–6	7–5	4–2	2–1	5–2
Boston	2–2	—	2–4	5–4	7–6	6–1	3–3	6–7	2–5	3–3	7–5	9–3	3–6	4–0
California	6–6	4–2	—	6–7	7–5	3–3	0–6	4–3	3–3	2–2	2–8	6–4	2–4	6–6
Chicago	6–3	4–5	7–6	—	2–5	3–3	2–0	4–1	2–4	5–7	7–6	3–3	2–4	7–5
Cleveland	2–4	6–7	5–7	5–2	—	1–5	4–4	3–6	2–1	7–5	3–2	8–4	2–2	4–2
Detroit	7–6	1–6	3–3	3–3	5–1	—	3–2	5–8	9–3	3–7	1–2	5–1	9–3	6–4
Kansas City	3–5	3–3	6–0	0–2	4–4	2–3	—	4–5	9–4	2–10	3–3	6–7	3–4	5–3
Milwaukee	4–2	7–6	3–4	1–4	6–3	8–5	5–4	—	9–3	3–3	4–2	2–2	4–5	6–4
Minnesota	0–6	5–2	3–3	4–2	1–2	3–9	4–9	3–9	—	3–3	2–8	3–6–1	5–8	5–1
New York	6–7	3–3	2–2	7–5	5–7	7–3	10–2	3–3	3–3	—	4–3	2–3	5–4	2–3
Oakland	5–7	5–7	8–2	6–7	2–3	2–1	3–3	2–4	8–2	3–4	—	6–1	4–2	10–2
Seattle	2–4	3–9	4–6	3–3	4–8	1–5	7–6	2–2	6–3–1	3–2	1–6	—	5–8	3–3
Texas	1–2	6–3	4–2	4–2	2–2	3–9	4–3	5–4	8–5	4–5	2–4	8–5	—	6–2
Toronto	2–5	0–4	6–6	5–7	2–4	4–6	3–5	4–6	1–5	3–2	2–10	3–3	2–6	—

=== Notable transactions ===
- April 6, 1981: The Athletics traded a player to be named later and cash to the Pittsburgh Pirates for Bob Owchinko. The Athletics completed the trade by sending Ernie Camacho to the Pirates on April 10.
- April 9, 1981: Dave Heaverlo was signed as a free agent by the Athletics.
- April 10, 1981: Gorman Heimueller was signed as a free agent by the Athletics.
- April 14, 1981: Chris Codiroli was signed as a free agent by the Athletics.
- April 22, 1981: Chuck Hensley was signed as a free agent with the Oakland Athletics.
- May 20, 1981: Dave Revering, Mike Patterson and Chuck Dougherty (minors) were traded by the Athletics to the New York Yankees for Jim Spencer and Tom Underwood.
- June 10, 1981: Rick Bosetti was purchased by the Athletics from the Toronto Blue Jays.
- August 27, 1981: Tim Hosley was released by the Athletics.

==== Draft picks ====
- June 8, 1981: 1981 Major League Baseball draft
  - Mike Gallego was drafted by the Athletics in the 2nd round (33rd pick). Player signed June 12, 1981.
  - Rick Rodriguez was drafted by the Athletics in the 2nd round (41st pick).
  - Mickey Tettleton was drafted by the Athletics in the 5th round.

=== Billyball, year two ===
Following the team's surprising success in 1980, manager Billy Martin was given the additional title of general manager in 1981. The team won the division title for the first time since 1975, winning the first half of the split season, then defeating the Royals in the divisional playoffs before losing to the Yankees in the ALCS.

While the team was successful, it came at a high price, both for the team and for the pitching staff. Following a season in which the team led the league in complete games with 94—an astonishing number for the time—the Athletics again led the league with 60 complete games out of 109 total games in the strike-shortened season. For the second time, the pitching staff completed more than half their total number of games and more than double the number of the team with the second-highest total (The Indians and Tigers each had 33). The workload of the pitchers over the two seasons was blamed by the team's ownership for the team's fall to fifth place in 1982, which led to Martin's firing from both positions. Many of the pitchers suffered injuries, and none of the four main starting pitchers (Rick Langford, Steve McCatty, Mike Norris, Matt Keough) ever duplicated their success of 1980–81.

=== Roster ===
1981 Oakland Athletics
Roster
Pitchers: 55 Dave Beard; 28 Rich Bordi; 23 Ed Figueroa; 60 Dave Heaverlo; 38 Jeff Jones; 27 Matt Keough; 50 Brian Kingman; 22 Rick Langford; 54 Steve McCatty; 34 Bo McLaughlin; 32 Craig Minetto; 17 Mike Norris; 51 Bob Owchinko; 31 Tom Underwood	Catchers: 2 Mike Heath; 32 Bob Kearney; 5 Jeff Newman; Infielders: 3 Shooty Babitt; 48,49 Jeff Cox; 18 Brian Doyle; 14 Keith Drumright; 10 Wayne Gross; 25 Tim Hosley; 9 Mickey Klutts; 26 Kelvin Moore; 8 Rob Picciolo; 13 Dave Revering; 15 Jimmy Sexton; 12 Jim Spencer; 11 Fred Stanley	Outfielders: 20 Tony Armas; 7 Rick Bosetti; 16 Mike Davis; 35 Rickey Henderson; 21 Dwayne Murphy; 29 Jim Nettles; 47 Mike Patterson; Other batters: 13,15 Mark Budaska; 44 Cliff Johnson; 6 Mitchell Page	Manager: 1 Billy Martin; Coaches: 41 Clete Boyer; 42 Art Fowler; 40 George Mitterwald; 45 Jackie Moore; 43 Lee Walls

== Player stats ==
=== Batting ===
= Indicates team leader

= Indicates league leader

==== Starters by position ====
Note: Pos = Position; G = Games played; AB = At bats; H = Hits; Avg. = Batting average; HR = Home runs; RBI = Runs batted in

Pos.	Player	G	AB	R	H	Avg.	HR	RBI	SB
C	Mike Heath	84	301	26	71	.236	8	30	3
1B	Jim Spencer	54	171	14	35	.205	2	9	1
2B	Shooty Babitt	54	156	10	40	.256	0	14	5
3B	Wayne Gross	82	243	29	50	.206	10	31	2
SS	Rob Picciolo	82	179	23	48	.268	4	13	0
LF	Rickey Henderson	108	423	89	135	.319	6	35	56
CF	Dwayne Murphy	107	390	58	98	.251	15	60	10
RF	Tony Armas	109	440	51	115	.261	22*	76	5
DH	Cliff Johnson	84	273	40	71	.260	17	59	5

- Tied with Dwight Evans (Boston), Bobby Grich (California) and Eddie Murray (Baltimore)

==== Other batters ====
Note: G = Games played; AB = At bats; H = Hits; Avg. = Batting average; HR = Home runs; RBI = Runs batted in

Player	G	AB	H	Avg.	HR	RBI
Dave McKay	79	224	59	.263	4	21
Jeff Newman	68	216	50	.231	3	15
Fred Stanley	66	145	28	.193	0	7
Mitchell Page	34	92	13	.141	4	13
Dave Revering	31	87	20	.230	2	10
Keith Drumright	31	86	25	.291	0	11
Kelvin Moore	14	47	12	.255	1	3
Mickey Klutts	15	46	17	.370	5	11
Brian Doyle	17	40	5	.125	0	3
Mark Budaska	9	32	5	.156	0	2
Mike Patterson	12	23	8	.348	0	1
Tim Hosley	18	21	2	.095	1	5
Mike Davis	17	20	1	.050	0	0
Rick Bosetti	9	19	2	.105	0	1
Jimmy Sexton	7	3	0	.000	0	0
Jeff Cox	2	0	0	----	0	0
Bob Kearney	1	0	0	----	0	0
Jim Nettles	1	0	0	----	0	0

=== Pitching ===
==== Starting pitchers ====
Note: G = Games played; IP = Innings pitched; W = Wins; L = Losses; ERA = Earned run average; SO = Strikeouts

Player	G	IP	W	L	ERA	SO
Rick Langford	24	195.1	12	10	2.99	84
Mike Norris	23	172.2	12	9	3.75	78
Steve McCatty	22	185.2	14	7	2.33	91
Matt Keough	19	140.1	10	6	3.40	60
Brian Kingman	18	100.1	3	6	3.95	52

==== Other pitchers ====
Note: G = Games pitched; IP = Innings pitched; W = Wins; L = Losses; ERA = Earned run average; SO = Strikeouts

Player	G	IP	W	L	ERA	SO
Tom Underwood	16	51.0	3	2	3.18	46
Ed Figueroa	2	8.1	0	0	5.40	1

==== Relief pitchers ====
Note: G = Games pitched; W = Wins; L = Losses; SV = Saves; ERA = Earned run average; SO = Strikeouts

Player	G	W	L	SV	ERA	SO
Jeff Jones	33	4	1	3	3.39	43
Bob Owchinko	29	4	3	2	3.20	26
Bo McLaughlin	11	0	0	1	11.57	3
Dave Beard	8	1	1	3	2.77	15
Craig Minetto	8	0	0	0	2.70	4
Dave Heaverlo	6	1	0	0	1.59	2
Rich Bordi	2	0	0	0	0.00	0

== Postseason ==
=== ALDS ===
Oakland wins series, 3-0.

Game	Score	Date	Location	Attendance
1	Oakland 4, Kansas City 0	October 6	Royals Stadium	40,592
2	Oakland 2, Kansas City 1	October 7	Royals Stadium	40,274
3	Oakland 4, Kansas City 1	October 9	Oakland Coliseum	40,002

=== ALCS ===
Yankees win the Series, 3-0

Game	Score	Date	Location	Attendance
1	Oakland – 1, New York – 3	October 13	Yankee Stadium	55,740
2	Oakland – 3, New York – 13	October 14	Yankee Stadium	48,497
3	New York – 4, Oakland – 0	October 15	Oakland Coliseum	47,302

=== Game log ===
1981 Playoff Game Log
1981 American League Western Division Series vs. Kansas City Royals – Oakland wins series 3–0

#	Date	Opponent	Score	Win	Loss	Save	Attendance	Series	Report
Game 1	October 6	@ Royals							
Game 2	October 7	@ Royals							
Game 3	October 9	Royals							

1981 American League Championship Series vs. New York Yankees – New York Yankees wins series 3–0

#	Date	Opponent	Score	Win	Loss	Save	Attendance	Series	Report
Game 1	October 13	@ Yankees							
Game 2	October 14	@ Yankees							
Game 3	October 15	Yankees							

Legend
Athletics win	Athletics loss

== Awards and honors ==
- Rickey Henderson, American League leader, Hits
- Billy Martin, Associated Press AL Manager of the Year

== Farm system ==
Level	Team	League	Manager
AAA	Tacoma Tigers	Pacific Coast League	Ed Nottle
AA	West Haven A's	Eastern League	Bob Didier
A	Modesto A's	California League	Keith Lieppman
A-Short Season	Medford A's	Northwest League	Brad Fischer

LEAGUE CHAMPIONS: Medford
