= 1982 Oakland Athletics season =

1982 Oakland Athletics
- League: American League
- Division: West
- Ballpark: Oakland–Alameda County Coliseum
- City: Oakland, California
- Record: 68–94 (.420)
- Divisional place: 5th
- Owners: Walter A. Haas, Jr.
- General managers: Billy Martin
- Managers: Billy Martin
- Television: KBHK-TV (Bill King, Harmon Killebrew, Lon Simmons)
- Radio: KSFO (Bill King, Lon Simmons, Wayne Hagin)

The 1982 Oakland Athletics season was the 82nd season for the Oakland Athletics franchise, all as members of the American League, and their 15th season in Oakland. The Athletics finished fifth in the American League West with a record of 68 wins and 94 losses.

The 1982 Athletics are remembered mainly for the exploits of star left fielder Rickey Henderson. Henderson, in his fourth major league season, stole an MLB-record 130 bases over the course of the year. Henderson broke the record, previously held by Lou Brock, by swiping his 119th base of the season on August 27 against the Milwaukee Brewers. Henderson's record has not been approached since.

The season also marked the end of manager Billy Martin's tenure with the Athletics. Martin was unceremoniously fired at season's end, despite having led the A's to the ALCS only one season prior. He was replaced by Steve Boros.

== Offseason ==
- December 4, 1981: Joe Rudi was signed as a free agent by the Athletics.
- December 9, 1981: Rich Bordi was traded by the Athletics to the Seattle Mariners for Dan Meyer.
- February 7, 1982: Dennis Kinney was signed as a free agent by the Athletics.
- February 24, 1982: Craig Minetto was traded by the Athletics to the Baltimore Orioles for Allen Edwards (minors).

== Regular season ==
- In the first fifty games of the season, Rickey Henderson had stolen 49 bases. By the All-Star break, Henderson had 84 steals.
- October 3, 1982: Joe Rudi hit a home run in the last at-bat of his career.

=== Season standings ===
AL West
Team	W	L	Pct.	GB	Home	Road
California Angels	93	69	.574	—	52‍–‍29	41‍–‍40
Kansas City Royals	90	72	.556	3	56‍–‍25	34‍–‍47
Chicago White Sox	87	75	.537	6	49‍–‍31	38‍–‍44
Seattle Mariners	76	86	.469	17	42‍–‍39	34‍–‍47
Oakland Athletics	68	94	.420	25	36‍–‍45	32‍–‍49
Texas Rangers	64	98	.395	29	38‍–‍43	26‍–‍55
Minnesota Twins	60	102	.370	33	37‍–‍44	23‍–‍58

=== Record vs. opponents ===
1982 American League record Sources:
Team	BAL	BOS	CAL	CWS	CLE	DET	KC	MIL	MIN	NYY	OAK	SEA	TEX	TOR
Baltimore	—	4–9	7–5	5–7	6–7	7–6	4–8	9–4–1	8–4	11–2	7–5	7–5	9–3	10–3
Boston	9–4	—	7–5	4–8	6–7	8–5	6–6	4–9	6–6	7–6	8–4	7–5	10–2	7–6
California	5–7	5–7	—	8–5	8–4	5–7	7–6	6–6	7–6	7–5	9–4	10–3	8–5	8–4
Chicago	7–5	8–4	5–8	—	6–6	9–3	3–10	3–9	7–6	8–4	9–4	6–7	8–5	8–4
Cleveland	7–6	7–6	4–8	6–6	—	6–7	2–10	7–6	8–4	4–9	4–8	9–3	7–5	7–6
Detroit	6–7	5–8	7–5	3–9	7–6	—	6–6	3–10	9–3	8–5	9–3	6–6	8–4	6–7
Kansas City	8–4	6–6	6–7	10–3	10–2	6–6	—	7–5	7–6	5–7	7–6	7–6	7–6	4–8
Milwaukee	4–9–1	9–4	6–6	9–3	6–7	10–3	5–7	—	7–5	8–5	7–5	8–4	7–5	9–4
Minnesota	4–8	6–6	6–7	6–7	4–8	3–9	6–7	5–7	—	2–10	3–10	5–8	5–8	5–7
New York	2–11	6–7	5–7	4–8	9–4	5–8	7–5	5–8	10–2	—	7–5	6–6	7–5	6–7
Oakland	5–7	4–8	4–9	4–9	8–4	3–9	6–7	5–7	10–3	5–7	—	6–7	5–8	3–9
Seattle	5–7	5–7	3–10	7–6	3–9	6–6	6–7	4–8	8–5	6–6	7–6	—	9–4	7–5
Texas	3–9	2–10	5–8	5–8	5–7	4–8	6–7	5–7	8–5	5–7	8–5	4–9	—	4–8
Toronto	3–10	6–7	4–8	4–8	6–7	7–6	8–4	4–9	7–5	7–6	9–3	5–7	8–4	—

=== Notable transactions ===
- May 14, 1982: Rob Picciolo was traded by the Athletics to the Milwaukee Brewers for Mike Warren and John Evans (minors).
- June 7, 1982: 1982 Major League Baseball draft
  - Phil Stephenson was drafted by the Athletics in the 3rd round.
  - Charlie O'Brien was drafted by the Athletics in the 5th round.
  - Jeff Kaiser was drafted by the Athletics in the 10th round.
  - Jim Eppard was drafted by the Athletics in the 13th round.
  - José Canseco was drafted by the Athletics in the 15th round. Canseco signed on June 17, 1982.
- June 28, 1982: Jim Spencer was released by the Oakland Athletics.
- July 15, 1982: Preston Hanna was signed as a free agent by the Athletics.
- September 6, 1982: Rick Bosetti was released by the Athletics.

=== Roster ===
1982 Oakland Athletics
Roster
Pitchers: 32 Fernando Arroyo; 36 Steve Baker; 33 Dave Beard; 23 Chris Codiroli; 37 Tim Conroy; 32 John D'Acquisto; 49 Preston Hanna; 38 Jeff Jones; 27 Matt Keough; 29,50 Brian Kingman; 47 Dennis Kinney; 22 Rick Langford; 54 Steve McCatty; 34 Bo McLaughlin; 17 Mike Norris; 51 Bob Owchinko; 31 Tom Underwood	Catchers: 2 Mike Heath; 32 Bob Kearney; 5 Jeff Newman; Infielders: 8 Kevin Bell; 10 Wayne Gross; 9 Mickey Klutts; 15 Davey Lopes; 39 Dave McKay; 4 Dan Meyer; 25 Kelvin Moore; 18 Tony Phillips; 8 Rob Picciolo; 26 Joe Rudi; 19 Jimmy Sexton; 12 Jim Spencer; 11 Fred Stanley	Outfielders: 20 Tony Armas; 7 Rick Bosetti; 13 Darrell Brown; 16 Mike Davis; 35 Rickey Henderson; 21 Dwayne Murphy; Other batters: 3 Jeff Burroughs; 28 Danny Goodwin; 44 Cliff Johnson; 6 Mitchell Page	Manager: 1 Billy Martin; Coaches: 41 Clete Boyer; 42 Art Fowler; 43 Charlie Metro; 40 George Mitterwald; 45 Jackie Moore

== Player stats ==
=== Batting ===
==== Starters by position ====
Note: Pos = Position; G = Games played; AB = At bats; H = Hits; Avg. = Batting average; HR = Home runs; RBI = Runs batted in

Pos	Player	G	AB	H	Avg.	HR	RBI
C	Mike Heath	101	318	77	.242	3	39
1B	Dan Meyer	120	383	92	.240	8	59
2B	Davey Lopes	128	450	109	.242	11	42
3B	Wayne Gross	129	386	97	.251	9	41
SS	Fred Stanley	101	228	44	.193	2	17
LF	Rickey Henderson	149	536	143	.267	10	51
CF	Dwayne Murphy	151	543	129	.238	27	94
RF	Tony Armas	138	536	125	.233	28	89
DH	Jeff Burroughs	113	285	79	.277	16	48

==== Other batters ====
Note: G = Games played; AB = At bats; H = Hits; Avg. = Batting average; HR = Home runs; RBI = Runs batted in

Player	G	AB	H	Avg.	HR	RBI
Jeff Newman	72	251	50	.199	6	30
Cliff Johnson	73	214	51	.238	7	31
Dave McKay	78	212	42	.198	4	17
Joe Rudi	71	193	41	.212	5	18
Mickey Klutts	55	157	28	.178	0	14
Jimmy Sexton	69	139	34	.245	2	14
Jim Spencer	33	101	17	.168	2	5
Tony Phillips	40	81	17	.210	0	8
Mitchell Page	31	78	20	.256	4	7
Mike Davis	23	75	30	.400	1	10
Bob Kearney	22	71	12	.169	0	5
Kelvin Moore	21	67	15	.224	2	6
Danny Goodwin	17	52	11	.212	2	8
Rob Picciolo	18	49	11	.224	0	3
Darrell Brown	8	18	6	.333	0	3
Rick Bosetti	6	15	3	.200	0	0
Kevin Bell	4	9	3	.333	0	0

=== Pitching ===
==== Starting pitchers ====
Note: G = Games pitched; IP = Innings pitched; W = Wins; L = Losses; ERA = Earned run average; SO = Strikeouts

Player	G	IP	W	L	ERA	SO
Rick Langford	32	237.1	11	16	4.21	79
Matt Keough	34	209.1	11	18	5.72	75
Mike Norris	28	166.1	7	11	4.76	83
Steve McCatty	21	128.2	6	3	3.99	66
Brian Kingman	23	122.2	4	12	4.48	46
Tim Conroy	5	25.1	2	2	3.55	17
Chris Codiroli	3	16.2	1	2	4.32	5

==== Other pitchers ====
Note: G = Games pitched; IP = Innings pitched; W = Wins; L = Losses; ERA = Earned run average; SO = Strikeouts

Player	G	IP	W	L	ERA	SO
Tom Underwood	56	153.0	10	6	3.29	79
Steve Baker	5	25.2	1	1	4.56	14

==== Relief pitchers ====
Note: G = Games pitched; W = Wins; L = Losses; SV = Saves; ERA = Earned run average; SO = Strikeouts

Player	G	W	L	SV	ERA	SO
Dave Beard	54	10	9	11	3.44	73
Bob Owchinko	54	2	4	3	5.21	67
Preston Hanna	23	0	4	0	5.59	32
Bo McLaughlin	21	0	4	0	4.84	27
Jeff Jones	18	3	1	0	5.11	18
John D'Acquisto	11	0	1	0	5.29	7
Fernando Arroyo	10	0	0	0	5.24	9
Dennis Kinney	3	0	0	0	8.31	0

== Farm system ==
Level	Team	League	Manager
AAA	Tacoma Tigers	Pacific Coast League	Ed Nottle
AA	West Haven A's	Eastern League	Bob Didier
A	Modesto A's	California League	Pete Whisenant
A	Madison Muskies	Midwest League	Brad Fischer
A-Short Season	Medford A's	Northwest League	Dennis Rogers
Rookie	Idaho Falls A's	Pioneer League	Keith Lieppman

LEAGUE CHAMPIONS: West Haven, Modesto
