= 1981 Milwaukee Brewers season =

1981 Milwaukee Brewers
- League: American League
- Division: East
- Ballpark: Milwaukee County Stadium
- City: Milwaukee, Wisconsin
- Record: 1st half: 31–25 (.554); 2nd half: 31–22 (.585); Overall: 62–47 (.569)
- Divisional place: 1st half: 3rd (3 GB); 2nd half: 1st
- Owners: Bud Selig
- General managers: Harry Dalton
- Managers: Buck Rodgers
- Television: WVTV (Kent Derdivanis, Mike Hegan, Steve Shannon); SelecTV (Joe Castiglione, Tom Collins)
- Radio: WISN (AM) (Lorn Brown, Bob Uecker)

The 1981 Milwaukee Brewers season was the franchise's 13th overall season and 12th season based in Milwaukee. The Brewers finished first in American League East during the second half of the split season (caused by the 1981 Major League Baseball strike) and compiled an overall record of 62 wins and 47 losses. The team advanced to the postseason for the first time in franchise history due to their second-half first-place finish, but lost to the New York Yankees in the ALDS. Rollie Fingers became the first relief pitcher in the history of the American League to win the MVP Award.

== Offseason ==
- December 12, 1980: Sixto Lezcano, David Green, Lary Sorensen and Dave LaPoint were traded by the Brewers to the St. Louis Cardinals for Ted Simmons, Rollie Fingers and Pete Vuckovich.
- January 13, 1981: Ernest Riles was drafted by the Brewers in the 3rd round of the 1981 Major League Baseball draft (Secondary phase).
- February 21, 1981: Paul Hartzell was signed as a free agent by the Brewers.
- March 20, 1981: Bob Galasso was released by the Brewers.

== Regular season ==
=== Season standings ===
AL East
Team	W	L	Pct.	GB	Home	Road
Milwaukee Brewers	62	47	.569	—	28‍–‍21	34‍–‍26
Baltimore Orioles	59	46	.562	1	33‍–‍22	26‍–‍24
New York Yankees	59	48	.551	2	32‍–‍19	27‍–‍29
Detroit Tigers	60	49	.550	2	32‍–‍23	28‍–‍26
Boston Red Sox	59	49	.546	2½	30‍–‍23	29‍–‍26
Cleveland Indians	52	51	.505	7	25‍–‍29	27‍–‍22
Toronto Blue Jays	37	69	.349	23½	17‍–‍36	20‍–‍33

AL East First Half Standings	W	L	Pct.	GB
New York Yankees	34	22	.607	—
Baltimore Orioles	31	23	.574	2
Milwaukee Brewers	31	25	.554	3
Detroit Tigers	31	26	.544	3 1/2
Boston Red Sox	30	26	.536	4
Cleveland Indians	26	24	.520	5
Toronto Blue Jays	16	42	.276	19

AL East Second Half Standings	W	L	Pct.	GB
Milwaukee Brewers	31	22	.585	—
Boston Red Sox	29	23	.558	1 1/2
Detroit Tigers	29	23	.558	1 1/2
Baltimore Orioles	28	23	.549	2
Cleveland Indians	26	27	.491	5
New York Yankees	25	26	.490	5
Toronto Blue Jays	21	27	.438	7 1/2

=== Record vs. opponents ===
1981 American League record Sources:
Team	BAL	BOS	CAL	CWS	CLE	DET	KC	MIL	MIN	NYY	OAK	SEA	TEX	TOR
Baltimore	—	2–2	6–6	3–6	4–2	6–7	5–3	2–4	6–0	7–6	7–5	4–2	2–1	5–2
Boston	2–2	—	2–4	5–4	7–6	6–1	3–3	6–7	2–5	3–3	7–5	9–3	3–6	4–0
California	6–6	4–2	—	6–7	7–5	3–3	0–6	4–3	3–3	2–2	2–8	6–4	2–4	6–6
Chicago	6–3	4–5	7–6	—	2–5	3–3	2–0	4–1	2–4	5–7	7–6	3–3	2–4	7–5
Cleveland	2–4	6–7	5–7	5–2	—	1–5	4–4	3–6	2–1	7–5	3–2	8–4	2–2	4–2
Detroit	7–6	1–6	3–3	3–3	5–1	—	3–2	5–8	9–3	3–7	1–2	5–1	9–3	6–4
Kansas City	3–5	3–3	6–0	0–2	4–4	2–3	—	4–5	9–4	2–10	3–3	6–7	3–4	5–3
Milwaukee	4–2	7–6	3–4	1–4	6–3	8–5	5–4	—	9–3	3–3	4–2	2–2	4–5	6–4
Minnesota	0–6	5–2	3–3	4–2	1–2	3–9	4–9	3–9	—	3–3	2–8	3–6–1	5–8	5–1
New York	6–7	3–3	2–2	7–5	5–7	7–3	10–2	3–3	3–3	—	4–3	2–3	5–4	2–3
Oakland	5–7	5–7	8–2	6–7	2–3	2–1	3–3	2–4	8–2	3–4	—	6–1	4–2	10–2
Seattle	2–4	3–9	4–6	3–3	4–8	1–5	7–6	2–2	6–3–1	3–2	1–6	—	5–8	3–3
Texas	1–2	6–3	4–2	4–2	2–2	3–9	4–3	5–4	8–5	4–5	2–4	8–5	—	6–2
Toronto	2–5	0–4	6–6	5–7	2–4	4–6	3–5	4–6	1–5	3–2	2–10	3–3	2–6	—

=== Notable transactions ===
- April 1, 1981: John Poff was traded by the Brewers to the Chicago White Sox for Thad Bosley.
- April 4, 1981: Bill Lyons was released by the Brewers.
- April 5, 1981: Dan Boitano was purchased from the Brewers by the New York Mets from the Milwaukee Brewers.
- June 8, 1981: Bryan Clutterbuck was drafted by the Milwaukee Brewers in the 7th round of the 1981 amateur draft.
- July 8, 1981: Paul Hartzell was released by the Brewers.

=== Roster ===
1981 Milwaukee Brewers roster
Roster
Pitchers: 46 Jerry Augustine; 47 Dwight Bernard; 48 Mike Caldwell; 25 Reggie Cleveland; 49 Frank DiPino; 28 Jamie Easterly; 34 Rollie Fingers; 30 Moose Haas; 45 Rickey Keeton; 35 Randy Lerch; 10 Bob McClure; 26 Donnie Moore; 51 Willie Mueller; 43 Chuck Porter; 41 Jim Slaton; 50 Pete Vuckovich	Catchers: 22 Charlie Moore; 23 Ted Simmons; 5 Ned Yost; Infielders: 6 Sal Bando; 15 Cecil Cooper; 17 Jim Gantner; 13 Roy Howell; 7 Don Money; 11 Ed Romero; 19 Robin Yount	Outfielders: 27 Thad Bosley; 29 Mark Brouhard; 16 Marshall Edwards; 4 Paul Molitor; 24 Ben Oglivie; 20 Gorman Thomas; Other batters: 9 Larry Hisle	Manager: 37 Buck Rodgers; Coaches: 12 Larry Haney (Bullpen); 18 Ron Hansen (First Base); 32 Harvey Kuenn (Hitting); 38 Cal McLish (Pitching); 36 Harry Warner (Third Base)

== Game log ==
=== Regular season ===
Legend
	Brewers win
	Brewers loss
	Postponement
	Clinched playoff spot
**Bold**	Brewers team member

1981 regular season game log: 62–47 (Home: 28–21; Away: 34–26)
April: 9–7 (Home: 3–5; Away: 6–2)

#	Date	Time (CT)	Opponent	Score	Loss	Win	Save	Time of Game	Attendance	Record	Box/ Streak

May: 18–12 (Home: 11–6; Away: 7–6)

#	Date	Time (CT)	Opponent	Score	Loss	Win	Save	Time of Game	Attendance	Record	Box/ Streak

June: 4–6 (Home: 1–1; Away: 3–5)

#	Date	Time (CT)	Opponent	Score	Loss	Win	Save	Time of Game	Attendance	Record	Box/ Streak

July: 0–0 (Home: 0–0; Away: 0–0)

#	Date	Time (CT)	Opponent	Score	Loss	Win	Save	Time of Game	Attendance	Record	Box/ Streak

August: 13–9 (Home: 5–4; Away: 8–5)

#	Date	Time (CT)	Opponent	Score	Loss	Win	Save	Time of Game	Attendance	Record	Box/ Streak
ASG	August 9	7:35 p.m. CDT	NL @ AL	5–4	Blue (1–0)	Fingers (0–1)	Sutter (1)	2:59	72,086	—	ASG

September: 16–12 (Home: 6–4; Away: 10–8)

#	Date	Time (CT)	Opponent	Score	Loss	Win	Save	Time of Game	Attendance	Record	Box/ Streak

October: 2–1 (Home: 2–1; Away: 0–0)

#	Date	Time (CT)	Opponent	Score	Loss	Win	Save	Time of Game	Attendance	Record	Box/ Streak

=== Postseason Game log ===
Legend
	Brewers win
	Brewers loss
**Bold**	Brewers team member

1981 Postseason game log: 2–3 (Home: 0–2; Away: 2–1)
AL Eastern Division Series: vs. New York Yankees 2–3 (Home: 0–2; Away: 2–1)

#	Date	Time (CT)	Opponent	Score	Win	Loss	Save	Time of Game	Attendance	Series	Box/ Streak
1	October 7	7:10 p.m. CDT	Yankees	3–5	Davis (1–0)	**Haas** (0–1)	Gossage (1)	2:57	35,064	NYA 1–0	L1
2	October 8	2:10 p.m. CDT	Yankees	0–3	Righetti (1–0)	**Caldwell** (0–1)	Gossage (2)	2:20	26,395	NYA 2–0	L2
3	October 9	7:10 p.m. CDT	@ Yankees	5–3	**Fingers** (1–0)	John (0–1)	—	2:39	56,411	NYA 2–1	W1
4	October 10	3:10 p.m. CDT	@ Yankees	2–1	**Vuckovich** (1–0)	Reuschel (0–1)	**Fingers** (1)	2:34	52,077	TIE 2–2	W2
5	October 11	6:10 p.m. CDT	@ Yankees	3–7	Righetti (2–0)	**Haas** (0–2)	Gossage (3)	2:47	47,505	NYA 3–2	L1

== Player stats ==
=== Batting ===
==== Starters by position ====
Note: Pos = Position; G = Games played; AB = At bats; H = Hits; Avg. = Batting average; HR = Home runs; RBI = Runs batted in

Pos	Player	G	AB	H	Avg.	HR	RBI
C	Ted Simmons	100	380	82	.216	14	61
1B	Cecil Cooper	106	416	133	.320	12	60
2B	Jim Gantner	107	352	94	.267	2	33
SS	Robin Yount	96	377	103	.273	10	49
3B	Don Money	60	185	40	.216	2	14
LF	Ben Oglivie	107	400	97	.243	14	72
CF	Gorman Thomas	103	363	94	.259	21	65
RF	Mark Brouhard	60	186	51	.274	2	20
DH	Larry Hisle	27	87	20	.230	4	11

==== Other batters ====
Note: G = Games played; AB = At bats; H = Hits; Avg. = Batting average; HR = Home runs; RBI = Runs batted in

Player	G	AB	H	Avg.	HR	RBI
Paul Molitor	64	251	67	.267	2	19
Roy Howell	76	244	58	.238	6	33
Charlie Moore	48	156	47	.301	1	9
Thad Bosley	42	105	24	.229	0	3
Ed Romero	44	91	18	.198	1	10
Sal Bando	32	65	13	.200	2	9
Marshall Edwards	40	58	14	.241	0	4
Ned Yost	18	27	6	.222	3	3

=== Pitching ===
==== Starting pitchers ====
Note: G = Games pitched; IP = Innings pitched; W = Wins; L = Losses; ERA = Earned run average; SO = Strikeouts

Player	G	IP	W	L	ERA	SO
Pete Vuckovich	24	149.2	14	4	3.55	84
Mike Caldwell	24	144.1	11	9	3.93	41
Moose Haas	24	137.1	11	7	4.46	64
Jim Slaton	24	117.1	5	7	4.37	47
Randy Lerch	23	110.2	7	9	4.31	53

==== Relief pitchers ====
Note: G = Games pitched; W = Wins; L = Losses; SV = Saves; ERA = Earned run average; SO = Strikeouts

Player	G	W	L	SV	ERA	SO
Rollie Fingers	47	6	3	28	1.04	61
Jamie Easterly	44	3	3	4	3.19	31
Reggie Cleveland	35	2	3	1	5.15	18
Jerry Augustine	27	2	2	2	4.26	26
Rickey Keeton	17	1	0	0	5.09	9
Dwight Bernard	6	0	0	0	3.60	1
Bob McClure	4	0	0	0	3.52	6
Chuck Porter	3	0	0	0	4.15	1
Donnie Moore	3	0	0	0	6.75	2
Frank DiPino	2	0	0	0	0.00	3
Willie Mueller	1	0	0	0	4.50	1

== ALDS ==
New York wins series, 3–2.

Game	Score	Date
1	New York 5, Milwaukee 3	October 7
2	New York 3, Milwaukee 0	October 8
3	Milwaukee 5, New York 3	October 9
4	Milwaukee 2, New York 1	October 10
5	New York 7, Milwaukee 3	October 11

== Awards and honors ==
- Cecil Cooper, Silver Slugger Award
- Rollie Fingers, American League Cy Young Award
- Rollie Fingers, American League MVP

== Farm system ==
The Brewers' farm system consisted of five minor league affiliates in 1981. The Butte Copper Kings won the Pioneer League championship.

Level	Team	League	Manager
Triple-A	Vancouver Canadians	Pacific Coast League	Lee Sigman
Double-A	El Paso Diablos	Texas League	Tony Muser
Class A	Stockton Ports	California League	Duane Espy
Class A	Burlington Bees	Midwest League	Terry Bevington
Rookie	Butte Copper Kings	Pioneer League	Ken Richardson
