= Tom Underwood =

American baseball player (1953–2010)

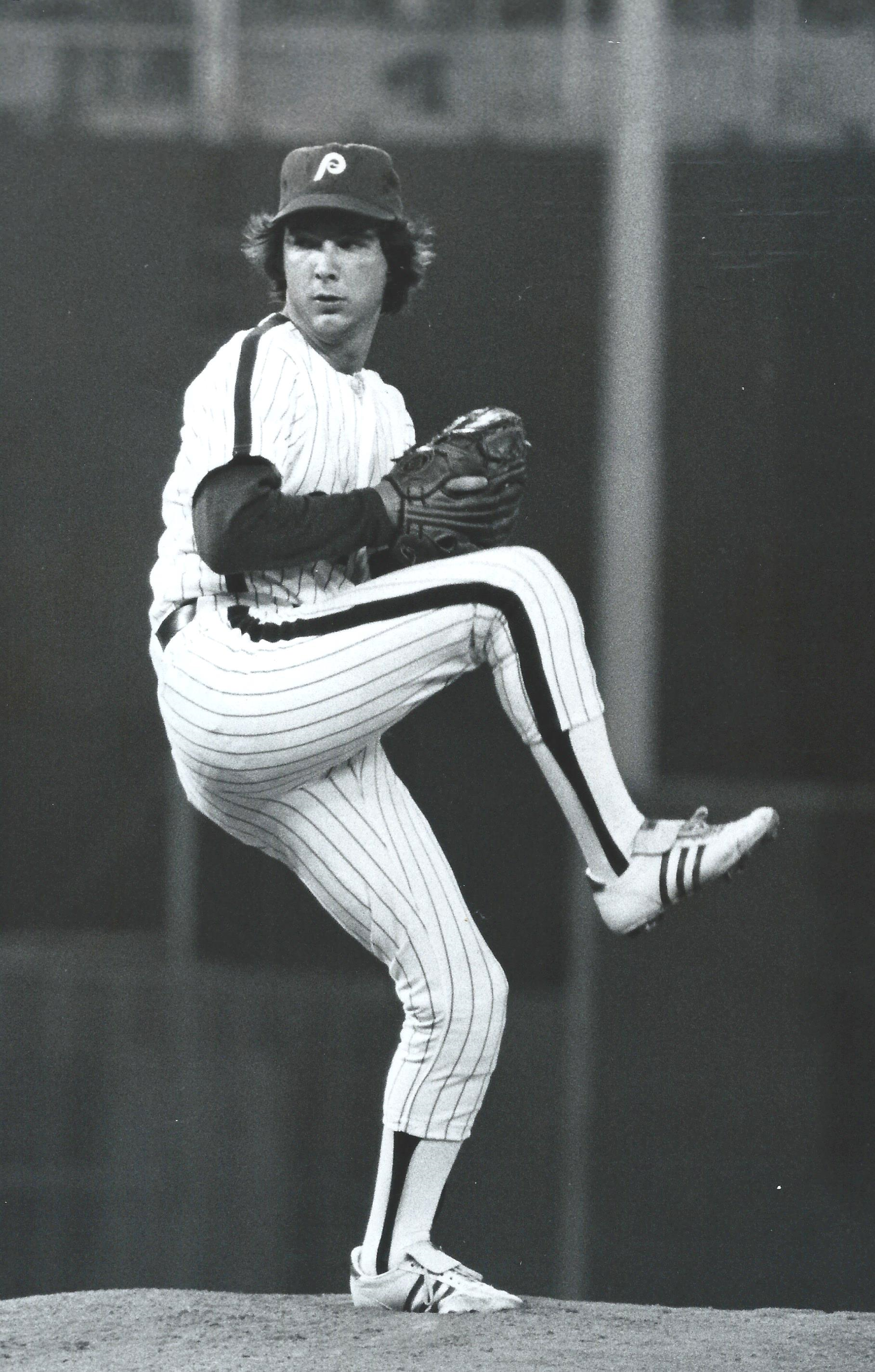
- Underwood with the Philadelphia Phillies
- Pitcher
- Born: December 22, 1953; Kokomo, Indiana, U.S.
- Died: November 22, 2010 (aged 56); West Palm Beach, Florida, U.S.
- Batted: Right Threw: Left

MLB debut
- August 19, 1974, for the Philadelphia Phillies

Last MLB appearance
- September 23, 1984, for the Baltimore Orioles

MLB statistics
- Win–loss record: 86–87
- Earned run average: 3.89
- Strikeouts: 948
- Stats at Baseball Reference

Teams
- Philadelphia Phillies (1974–1977); St. Louis Cardinals (1977); Toronto Blue Jays (1978–1979); New York Yankees (1980–1981); Oakland Athletics (1981–1983); Baltimore Orioles (1984)

Thomas Gerald Underwood (December 22, 1953 – November 22, 2010) was an American Major League Baseball pitcher. His younger brother, Pat was also a pitcher, and made his major league debut against Tom. It was the first time in major league history this had occurred.

== Kokomo High School ==
Underwood was also quarterback for Kokomo High School's football team on top of playing baseball. In baseball, his junior and senior years, he went 17–3 with a 0.40 earned run average. Simultaneously, he compiled a 25–1 record playing American Legion Baseball, helping Post 6 win the 1972 Indiana state championship.

He signed a letter of intent to play college baseball at Western Michigan University before being selected in the second-round pick of the 1972 Major League Baseball draft by the Philadelphia Phillies.

== Philadelphia Phillies ==
=== Topps All-Star Rookie ===
In his first season of professional baseball with the Spartanburg Phillies, Underwood went 13–6 record with a Western Carolinas League leading 2.10 ERA and 187 strikeouts. He went 14–5 with a 2.51 in 1974 for the double A Toledo Mud Hens to earn a call up to the majors at just twenty years old.

Underwood faced the "Big Red Machine" in his major league debut. After striking out the first batter he faced (Dan Driessen), Cesar Geronimo followed with a single and Dave Concepción followed with a double. He intentionally walked George Foster to load the bases for opposing pitcher Don Gullett. Gullett singled, scoring two. Pete Rose walked, reloading the bases. Joe Morgan unloaded them with a grand slam home run. He exited the game at that point with a 162.00 ERA.

In 12.2 innings pitched after that, Underwood allowed one earned run. He earned his first major league win on September 25 against the New York Mets.

Phillies manager Danny Ozark added Underwood to the starting rotation for the 1975 season. Making his first start against the St. Louis Cardinals, Underwood escaped a bases loaded, one out jam in the fifth, highlighted by a force out at home on a ground ball back to the mound by opposing pitcher Bob Forsch. From there, Underwood allowed just two base runners in recording his first career shutout. On May 13, facing the Cincinnati Reds for the first time since his major league debut, Underwood pitched his second career shutout. For the season, Underwood went 14–13 with a 4.14 ERA and 123 strikeouts to be named the left-handed pitcher on the Topps All-Star Rookie Team.

=== First postseason since 1950 ===
Underwood split the beginning of the 1976 season between starts and relief appearances. On May 19, he earned a save against the Mets. He was 5–1 with a 3.41 ERA at the All-Star break to secure himself a spot in the starting rotation for the rest of the year.

The 1976 Phillies made it to the post season. The Reds beat the Phillies in the first two games, but the Phillies were holding onto a 6–4 lead when the Reds came to bat in the bottom of the ninth. Foster and Johnny Bench led off the inning with back-to-back home runs to tie the game. Concepción singled, bringing Underwood into the game. Underwood walked the first batter he faced, Geronimo; Ed Armbrister successfully bunted the runners over. Underwood intentionally walked Rose to face Ken Griffey with the bases loaded. He singled to send the Reds to the 1976 World Series.

For the 1977 season, Underwood and Wayne Twitchell switched roles, with Underwood heading to the bullpen and Twitchell starting. He was 3–2 with a save and a 5.13 ERA when the Phillies traded him and outfielders Rick Bosetti and Dane Iorg to the Cardinals for All-Star outfielder Bake McBride and minor league pitcher Steve Waterbury.

== St. Louis Cardinals ==
In his first start as a Cardinal against the Los Angeles Dodgers, he was trailing 2–1 when he exited the game in the fourth with the bases loaded. Clay Carroll allowed all three inherited runners to score, giving Underwood five earned runs in 3.1 innings pitched. He ended his time in St. Louis at 6–9 with a 4.95 ERA. After the season, he and minor league pitcher Víctor Cruz were traded to the Toronto Blue Jays for pitcher Pete Vuckovich and a player to be named later.

== Toronto Blue Jays ==
Underwood experienced some déjà vu in his first start with his new franchise. After being saved by a double play in the first inning, he was unable to record an out in the second. He exited with the bases loaded, and two runs already across. Once again, the reliever allowed all three inherited runners to score.

He pitched well after that, but suffered from a lack of run support. On May 2, he pitched a complete game, but lost 2–1 to the Oakland Athletics. In his next start, he earned his first American League win by shutting out the A's. For the season, he pitched seven complete games, winning only the shutout.

The 1978 Jays went 59–102. Only one pitcher, Jim Clancy, had double digit wins (10). Underwood went 6–14 with a 4.10 ERA and led the staff with 139 strikeouts. Manager Roy Hartsfield made the unusual decision to move the staff's de facto ace, Jesse Jefferson, into the bullpen for 1979. By default, Underwood became the "ace," and was given the opening day assignment against the reigning American League West champion Kansas City Royals.

=== 1979 Opening day starter ===
After a 1-2-3 first inning, things fell apart for Underwood and the Jays as a whole in the second inning. After walking clean-up hitter Al Cowens, Underwood induced a double play ball from the next batter Hal McRae. Instead, third baseman Roy Howell committed an error, and both runners were safe. Underwood then walked the bases loaded for John Wathan. Wathan hit a bases clearing triple. He recorded his first out of the inning against future Hall of Famer George Brett, but also walked two batters and allowed a base hit to bring the score to 4–0 with Amos Otis coming to the plate. For the second time in the inning, Underwood induced a double play ball, and for the second time in the inning, the infielder committed an error (second baseman Dave McKay). Cowens came to bat for the second time in the inning, and flew out to center. McRae followed with a double that scored the seventh run of the inning, and ending Underwood's day. Two more runs would score before the inning came to a merciful end.

Underwood got off to an 0–3 start, but was in line to win his first game against the Milwaukee Brewers on May 3. Over eight innings, Underwood had walked three and allowed five hits as he stepped to the mound in the ninth with the Jays holding onto a 4–3 lead. After retiring the first batter, he gave up back-to-back singles to the next two. He hit the next batter with a pitch to load the bases.

Though Underwood was clearly gassed, Hartsfield stuck with him. Paul Molitor hit a ground ball back to Underwood, who threw it home for the force out at the plate. With two outs and the bases loaded, Underwood walked the next two batters for the loss.

=== Big league brothers ===
On May 31, 1979, Underwood made a start against the Detroit Tigers. The opposing pitcher was his brother, Pat, making his major league debut.

Tom found the whole thing stupid, but the brothers brought their best. Pat did not give up a hit until the fifth inning. Tom allowed four hits and struck out four in keeping the Tigers scoreless through seven. Then, Tigers center fielder Jerry Morales led off the eighth with a home run. Pat pitched into the ninth before handing the game over to the bullpen to close it out. For Tom, it was another complete game loss.

=== 0–9, 4.98 ERA ===
Underwood lost his next start, bringing him to 0–8 on the season, and 1–10 in complete games since joining the Jays. He would fall to 0–9 before finally winning his first game on June 15 by shutting out the A's. In his nine losses, the Jays scored fifteen runs.

His next start was another complete game loss, in which the Jays were only able to score one run, however, he managed to turn his season around from there. Over the remainder of the season, Underwood went 8–6 with a 3.22 ERA. Overall, he led his team with nine wins, a 3.69 ERA, 127 strikeouts and 227 innings pitched. He had eleven losses in which the Jays score two runs or fewer.

== New York Yankees ==
On November 1, 1979, the New York Yankees traded post season hero Chris Chambliss and young prospects Dámaso García and Paul Mirabella to the Jays for Underwood, catcher Rick Cerone and minor league outfielder Ted Wilborn. Underwood was happy to join a contender, and signed a four-year deal with his new club upon arrival.

He began his Yankee career in the bullpen, going 1–2 with a save and a 3.10 ERA before becoming one of four left handers in the starting rotation. His pattern of bad first starts in which he can't escape the second inning continued against the Baltimore Orioles on April 30, however, he followed that up with six victories in a row. He lost four of his next five, including the worst start of his career against the Texas Rangers (5 batters faced, no outs recorded, 5 earned runs).

The 1980 Yankees went 103–59 to return to the post season after a one-year hiatus. Underwood went 13–9 with a 3.66 ERA, two saves and two shutouts. He returned to the bullpen for the post season.

In game one of the 1980 American League Championship Series against the Royals, Underwood pitched what should have been a 1-2-3 eighth inning. Instead, Yankees first baseman Bob Watson made a two out error. This opened the door to the Royals scoring two more runs in their 7–2 game one victory. Underwood pitched again in game three; the Yankees were down 2–0 in the series, and 4–2 in game three when Underwood was handed the ball. Underwood pitched two scoreless innings, but so did Royals closer Dan Quisenberry, to complete the three-game sweep.

== Oakland A's ==
Underwood had a 1–4 record with a 4.41 ERA when he was traded along with Jim Spencer from the Yankees to the Oakland Athletics for Dave Revering, Mike Patterson and minor-league left-handed pitcher Chuck Dougherty on May 20, 1981. He made three starts upon joining his new team (no decisions) before the players strike interrupted the season. When play resumed, manager Billy Martin moved Underwood into the bullpen. He went 2–2 with a 3.48 ERA and a save. He also made two starts down the stretch. One of which was a four hit 5–1 victory over the Blue Jays in which he struck out a career high ten, including the last four batters he faced.

The A's won the first half of the split season format instituted for the 1981 season. Underwood faced just one batter in the 1981 American League Division Series with the Royals, striking out Willie Aikens. The A's swept the Royals in the ALDS to face Underwood's former team, the Yankees, in the 1981 American League Championship Series. The Yankees swept the series, with Underwood pitching in games one and three.

Underwood preferred starting, but was far more successful as a reliever in Oakland. He split the next two seasons pretty evenly between starting and relieving. In 1982, he was 5–3 with a 4.06 ERA in 64.1 innings pitched as a starter. As a reliever, his record was also 5–3, but with a 2.74 ERA and a career best seven saves (second on the A's to Dave Beard) in 88.2 innings pitched.

In 1983 he had a 5.54 ERA in 76.1 innings as a starter, almost double the 2.37 ERA he had as a reliever. The 68.1 innings he pitched out of the bullpen was tied for second on the team, and he had four of the bullpen's 33 saves.

== Baltimore Orioles ==
A free agent after going 9–7 with four saves in 1983, Underwood signed a one-year contract with the Baltimore Orioles on February 6, 1984. He had also received a three-year offer from the Cleveland Indians but sacrificed security for an opportunity to play with the defending World Series champions. He made one start (May 12, 3 innings against the A's), but was otherwise exclusively a long reliever. He was 1–0 with one save and a 3.52 ERA on the season. The Orioles elected not to renew the option year on his contract on September 28, 1984. He returned to the Yankees in 1985, and went 1–3 with a 5.17 ERA in 28 minor league games before retiring.

== Career stats ==
W	L	Pct	ERA	G	GS	CG	SHO	SV	IP	H	ER	R	HR	BB	K	WP	HBP	BAA	Fld%	Avg.
86	87	.497	3.89	379	203	35	6	18	1586	1554	685	772	130	662	948	62	28	.259	.898	.117

Underwood reached the post season three times in his career. All three times, his team was swept in the championship series, and all three times he was his team's final pitcher, but he was never the losing pitcher. In 1999, the Kokomo Tribune named Underwood Howard County, Indiana’s "Greatest Athlete of the 20th Century." He was inducted into the Indiana Baseball Hall of Fame in 1997.

== Private life ==
After retiring, Underwood became a financial adviser. He met Christine Morra, an LPGA pro, at a golf tournament. They married, and had two children, a daughter Dani and a son John. Underwood died from pancreatic cancer on November 22, 2010.

His son, known as J.D., was drafted by the Dodgers in the fifth round of the 2013 Major League Baseball draft.
