= Dave Revering =

American baseball player (born 1953)

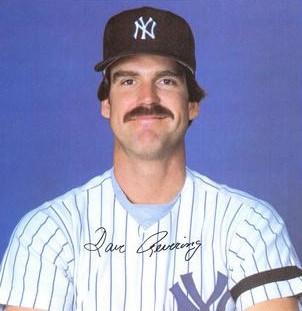
- Revering in 1981
- First baseman
- Born: February 12, 1953 (age 73); Roseville, California, U.S.
- Batted: Left Threw: Right

MLB debut
- April 8, 1978, for the Oakland A's

Last MLB appearance
- October 1, 1982, for the Seattle Mariners

MLB statistics
- Batting average: .265
- Home runs: 62
- Runs batted in: 234
- Stats at Baseball Reference

Teams
- Oakland Athletics (1978–1981); New York Yankees (1981–1982); Toronto Blue Jays (1982); Seattle Mariners (1982)

David Alvin Revering (born February 12, 1953) is an American former professional baseball player. He appeared in 557 games as a first baseman, designated hitter and pinch hitter in Major League Baseball from 1978 to 1982 for four American League teams. He batted left-handed and threw right handed, and was listed as 6 feet 4 inches (1.93 m) tall and 210 pounds (95 kg).

== Early career ==
Born in Roseville, California, Revering graduated from Bella Vista High School. He was drafted by the Cincinnati Reds in the seventh round of the 1971 Major League Baseball draft. Revering developed into a top prospect for the Reds, hitting as many as 29 home runs and driving in 110 runs for Indianapolis Indians in 1977. The Reds announced a trade in which they would acquire disgruntled Cy Young Award winning pitcher Vida Blue from the Oakland Athletics in exchange for Revering and $1.75 million at the Winter Meetings on December 9, 1977. Commissioner Bowie Kuhn vetoed the transaction on January 30, 1978. A new deal was struck one month later on February 25 when the Reds sent Revering and cash to Oakland for Doug Bair.

== Oakland A's ==
Upon his acquisition, Revering immediately assumed first base duties for the A's, batting .271 with sixteen home runs and 46 runs batted in his rookie season. The A's lost 108 games in 1979, however, Revering emerged as something of a star for the lowly club, hitting nineteen home runs and driving in 77 (both career highs) while batting .288. For his career in Oakland, he batted .279 with 52 home runs and 195 RBIs.

== New York Yankees ==
Revering was traded along with Mike Patterson and minor-league left-handed pitcher Chuck Dougherty from the Athletics to the New York Yankees for Jim Spencer and Tom Underwood on May 20, 1981.

He assumed Spencer's job of backing up Bob Watson at first base. He batted .235 with two home runs and seven RBIs seeing limited action during the strike shortened season, however, he did make the post-season for the only time in his career. He made two appearances in the 1981 American League Division Series as a late inning defensive replacement, but did not have an at-bat. He logged two at-bats in the 1981 American League Championship Series against the A's, collecting a single in the Yankees' 13-3 game two victory. Though the Yankees reached the 1981 World Series, Revering did not make an appearance.

== 1982-83 ==
A month into the 1982 season, the Yankees dealt Revering to the Toronto Blue Jays, with minor leaguers Tom Dodd and Jeff Reynolds for John Mayberry. In August, the Blue Jays offered Revering the choice of accepting a demotion to the minor leagues or his release; Revering picked the latter on August 2. Shortly afterwards, he signed with the Seattle Mariners; however, he was released at the end of the season. Revering joined the Detroit Tigers for spring training 1983, but did not make the club. He was offered a minor league assignment, but chose to retire instead.
