= Jeff Newman (baseball) =

American baseball player and manager (born 1948)

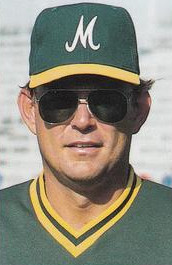
- Newman in 1988
- Catcher / First baseman / Coach
- Born: September 11, 1948 (age 77); Fort Worth, Texas, U.S.
- Batted: Right Threw: Right

MLB debut
- June 30, 1976, for the Oakland A's

Last MLB appearance
- September 7, 1984, for the Boston Red Sox

MLB statistics
- Batting average: .224
- Home runs: 63
- Runs batted in: 233
- Stats at Baseball Reference
- Managerial record at Baseball Reference

Teams
- As player: Oakland Athletics (1976–1982); Boston Red Sox (1983–1984); As manager: Oakland Athletics (1986); As coach: Oakland Athletics (1986); Cleveland Indians (1992–1999); Baltimore Orioles (2000); Seattle Mariners (2005)

Career highlights and awards
- All-Star (1979)

Jeffrey Lynn Newman (born September 11, 1948) is an American former professional baseball catcher and first baseman. Newman was drafted by the Cleveland Indians in the 26th round of the 1970 Major League Baseball draft. He made his Major League Baseball (MLB) debut in 1976 and was an All-Star in 1979. He later served as the interim manager of the Oakland Athletics in 1986.

== Early and personal life ==
Newman was born in Fort Worth, Texas, and is Jewish. He attended Paschal High School, where he played baseball and basketball. He later lived in Danville, California.

Newman is a convert to Judaism, having in 1970 converted in an Orthodox ceremony. His son, Ryan, was an infielder for three years in the Pittsburgh Pirates' organization before becoming a coach for the 2005 Gulf Coast League Pirates.

== College ==
Newman was a History major at Texas Christian University, where he earned a B.S. in Education and also earned All-America honors as a third baseman in 1968. In his sophomore year after batting .350 he was All-Southwest Conference First Team and All NCAA All-District First Team as well as NCAA All American Third Team, and in 1969 as a junior he batted .345, set university records in RBIs (44) and hits (57), and was All-Conference and All-District First Team.

== Minor leagues ==
Newman was drafted by the Cleveland Indians in the 26th round of the 1970 Major League Baseball draft. Originally, Newman played first, third and the outfield. He played for the GCL Indians of the Gulf Coast League in 1970 (batting .313, leading the league in RBIs with 55, and tying for the league lead in home runs with six, while playing primarily first base), for the Reno Silver Sox of the California League in 1971 (hitting 16 home runs in 234 at bats, while playing primarily outfield) and 1972 (hitting 20 home runs and 84 RBIs), and for the San Antonio Brewers of the Texas League in 1972. In 1974 he played for the Oklahoma City 89ers of the American Association and the Salt Lake City Angels of the Pacific Coast League (batting .303), in 1975 he played for Salt Lake City and for the Toledo Mud Hens of the International League, and in 1975 he again played for Toledo.

He didn't begin catching until 1972 with the Reno Silver Sox. He spent six seasons in the Indians' farm system, batting .259 with 73 home runs and 333 runs batted in when the Oakland A's purchased his contract in October 1975.

== Major leagues ==
=== Oakland Athletics ===
Newman was called up to the majors in June 1976, when he was 27 years old, and spent the rest of the season backing up Gene Tenace behind the plate. He backed up Manny Sanguillén in 1977, a season in which he threw out 51.8% of attempted base-stealers, third-best of all catchers in the American League. He then moved into a platoon with Jim Essian from 1978 through 1980, while also backing up Dave Revering at first base.

He was batting .229 with 16 home runs and 52 RBIs when he was selected by AL manager Bob Lemon as Oakland's sole representative at the 1979 Major League Baseball All-Star Game. For the season, he hit 22 home runs and drove in 71 runs, both career highs. He also threw out 46.8% of attempted base-stealers, fourth-best of all catchers in the American League.

Newman was involved in the first of two bench-clearing brawls with Lenny Randle and the Seattle Mariners on April 19, 1981. The A's won the first half of the strike shortened season with a 37–23 record to return to the postseason for the first time since 1975. In 1981 he also threw out 46.4% of attempted base-stealers, fifth-best of all catchers in the American League. In his only career trip to the postseason, Newman went hitless in nine plate appearances in the American League West division series and ALCS.

At the start of the December 1982 Winter Meetings, the A's sent Newman and outfielder Tony Armas to the Boston Red Sox for Carney Lansford, Garry Hancock, and minor leaguer Jerry King.

=== Boston Red Sox ===
When the Red Sox originally acquired Newman in 1982, it was with the intent that he would be the back-up to Rich Gedman behind the plate. However, he soon fell to third in the depth chart behind Gary Allenson. He was released during spring training in April 1985.

=== Career stats ===
Newman had perhaps his greatest hitting success against Wayne Garland, against whom he was 13–18 (.722) with two home runs, six doubles and a walk. He made his only appearance on the mound on September 14, 1977. He pitched one scoreless inning, though he hit the first batter he faced (Hal McRae) with a pitch.

Seasons	Games	PA	AB	Runs	Hits	2B	3B	HR	RBI	SB	BB	SO	Avg.	Slg.	OBP	OPS	Fld%	CS%
9	735	2290	2123	189	475	85	4	63	233	7	116	369	.224	.357	.264	.620	.981	39%

== Coaching and managerial career ==
As soon as his playing days ended, Newman returned to the Oakland A's as manager Jackie Moore's bullpen coach. When Moore was fired as A's manager on June 28, 1986, Newman was named interim manager prior to the hiring of Tony La Russa. The A's went 2–8 under Newman. Through 2018, he was one of eight Jewish managers in MLB history. The others were Gabe Kapler, Bob Melvin, Brad Ausmus, Norm Sherry, Harold “Lefty” Phillips, Lou Boudreau, and Lipman Pike. He remained a coach and manager with the A's at the minor league level through 1991, being named the Southern League's Manager of the Year in 1989 while managing the Huntsville Stars to a win–loss percentage of .573.

He was Mike Hargrove's third base coach with the Cleveland Indians from 1992–1999, and served as the Baltimore Orioles' bench coach in 2000. He began wearing a tie for the first time in his career in 2002, serving as a field assistant for the Commissioner's Office of Major League Baseball until joining the Seattle Mariners as third base coach in 2005. An August 2005 Achilles injury requiring surgery prematurely ended his coaching career in Seattle.

== See also ==
- List of Jewish Major League Baseball players
