= 1981 American League Division Series =

Teams
Team (Wins)		Manager	Season
Oakland Athletics (3)		Billy Martin	37–23, .617, GA: 1½ (1st half); 27–22, .551, GB: 1 (2nd half)
Kansas City Royals (0)		Dick Howser	20–30, .400, GB: 12 (1st half); 30–23, .566, GA: 1 (2nd half)
- Dates: October 6 – 9
- Television: ABC; KPIX-TV (OAK); WDAF-TV (KC)
- TV announcers: ABC: Al Michaels and Jim Palmer; KPIX: Bill King and Harmon Killebrew; WDAF: Al Wisk and Denny Trease
- Radio: CBS; KSFO (OAK); WIBW (KC)
- Radio announcers: CBS: Ned Martin and Bill White; KSFO: Bill King, Lon Simmons and Wayne Hagin; WIBW: Denny Matthews and Fred White
- Umpires: George Maloney, Joe Brinkman, Steve Palermo, Don Denkinger, Jim Evans, Jim McKean

Teams
Team (Wins)		Manager	Season
New York Yankees (3)		Bob Lemon	34–22, .607, GA: 2 (1st half); 25–26, .490, GB: 5 (2nd half)
Milwaukee Brewers (2)		Buck Rodgers	31–25, .554, GB: 3 (1st half); 31–22, .585, GA: 1½ (2nd half)
- Dates: October 7 – 11
- Television: ABC; WPIX (NYY); WVTV (MIL)
- TV announcers: ABC: Keith Jackson, Don Drysdale and Howard Cosell (Games 1–3, 5); Don Drysdale and Howard Cosell (Game 4); WPIX: Phil Rizzuto and Frank Messer (Games 1–3); Phil Rizzuto, Frank Messer and Bill White (Games 4–5); WVTV: Kent Derdivanis, Mike Hegan and Steve Shannon
- Radio: CBS; WABC (NYY); WISN (MIL)
- Radio announcers: CBS: Ernie Harwell and Curt Gowdy; WABC: Phil Rizzuto, Frank Messer, and Fran Healy (Games 1–3); Phil Rizzuto, Frank Messer, Bill White and Fran Healy (Games 4–5); WISN: Lorn Brown and Bob Uecker
- Umpires: Larry McCoy, Dale Ford, Ken Kaiser, Dave Phillips, Al Clark, Mike Reilly

The 1981 American League Division Series (ALDS), the opening round of the American League side of the 1981 MLB Postseason, began on Tuesday, October 6, and ended on Sunday, October 11. The Division Series were approved by team owners on August 6 in response to the 1981 Major League Baseball strike, which caused the cancellation of roughly one-third of the regular season between June 12 and August 9; by the time play was resumed, it was decided that the best approach was to have the first-half leaders automatically qualify for postseason play, and allow all the teams to begin the second half with a clean slate.

== Overview ==
The first half and second-half champions in both the American League East and American League West divisions would meet in best-of-five series, with the winners advancing to the AL Championship Series (ALCS). If the same team won both halves, a wild card team—the second-place team, based on overall record, in the division—would qualify for the postseason, but this proved unnecessary in both leagues. There were no plans to continue the format in later seasons, although the Division Series returned in 1995 on a permanent basis after MLB realigned to three divisions in each league. The teams in the 1981 ALDS were:

- East Division: New York Yankees (first-half champion, 34–22) vs. Milwaukee Brewers (second-half champion, 31–22): Yankees win series, 3–2.
- West Division: Oakland Athletics (first-half champion, 37–23) vs. Kansas City Royals (second-half champion, 30–23): Athletics win series, 3–0.

The second-half champions played the first two games at home, with the first-half champions hosting all remaining games; this was predetermined in August, independent of team records. Had a team won both halves of the season, they would have hosted all games of the series other than the first game, which the wild card team would host.

The Royals became the first team to reach the MLB postseason with a .500 or worse record, and would be the only team until the 2020 Astros and Brewers reached the 2020 postseason with records of 29–31 (.483). Following a 20–30 first half, Kansas City recovered to win the second half in the AL West, giving them a 50–53 (.485) overall mark. The Royals made a managerial change during the season as well; the team started at 30–40 (.429) under Jim Frey, then went 20–13 (.606) under Dick Howser.

The Yankees and Athletics went on to meet in the AL Championship Series. The Yankees became the American League champion, and lost to the National League champion Los Angeles Dodgers in the 1981 World Series.

== Matchups ==
=== Oakland Athletics vs. Kansas City Royals ===
Oakland won the series, 3–0.

Game	Date	Score	Location	Time	Attendance
1	October 6	Oakland Athletics – 4, Kansas City Royals – 0	Royals Stadium	2:35	40,592
2	October 7	Oakland Athletics – 2, Kansas City Royals – 1	Royals Stadium	2:50	40,274
3	October 9	Kansas City Royals – 1, Oakland Athletics – 4	Oakland–Alameda County Coliseum	2:59	40,002

=== New York Yankees vs. Milwaukee Brewers ===
New York won the series, 3–2.

Game	Date	Score	Location	Time	Attendance
1	October 7	New York Yankees – 5, Milwaukee Brewers – 3	County Stadium	2:57	35,064
2	October 8	New York Yankees – 3, Milwaukee Brewers – 0	County Stadium	2:20	26,395
3	October 9	Milwaukee Brewers – 5, New York Yankees – 3	Yankee Stadium	2:39	56,411
4	October 10	Milwaukee Brewers – 2, New York Yankees – 1	Yankee Stadium	2:34	52,077
5	October 11	Milwaukee Brewers – 3, New York Yankees – 7	Yankee Stadium	2:47	47,505

== Oakland vs. Kansas City ==
=== Game 1 ===
Tuesday, October 6, 1981 2:10 pm (CT) at Royals Stadium in Kansas City, Missouri 64 °F (18 °C), Clear
Team	1	2	3	4	5	6	7	8	9	R	H	E
Oakland	0	0	0	3	0	0	0	1	0	4	8	2
Kansas City	0	0	0	0	0	0	0	0	0	0	4	1
WP: Mike Norris (1–0) LP: Dennis Leonard (0–1); Home runs: OAK: Wayne Gross (1), Dwayne Murphy (1); KC: None; Attendance: 40,592; Boxscore

Mike Norris faced Dennis Leonard and the defending AL Champions in Game 1. Both pitchers were on their game and the game was scoreless through three innings. But in the top of the fourth, the A's got a boost on a three-run home run by Wayne Gross. Then Dwayne Murphy's homer in the eighth put the game away as Norris went on to pitch a four-hit complete game shutout.

=== Game 2 ===
Wednesday, October 7, 1981 2:10 pm (CT) at Royals Stadium in Kansas City, Missouri 60 °F (16 °C), Mostly Cloudy
Team	1	2	3	4	5	6	7	8	9	R	H	E
Oakland	1	0	0	0	0	0	0	1	0	2	10	1
Kansas City	0	0	0	0	1	0	0	0	0	1	6	0
WP: Steve McCatty (1–0) LP: Mike Jones (0–1); Home runs: OAK: none KC: none Attendance: 40,274; Boxscore

Steve McCatty and Mike Jones dueled in Game 2. After giving up an RBI double to Tony Armas in the first, Jones settled into a groove and kept the A's from scoring for the next six innings. McCatty would give up a run in the bottom of the fifth on Willie Wilson's RBI hit. In the eighth, Armas again delivered the game-winning RBI double to make it 2–1 A's. McCatty went on to pitch a complete game masterpiece.

=== Game 3 ===
Friday, October 9, 1981 5:10 pm (PT) at Oakland–Alameda County Coliseum in Oakland, California 66 °F (19 °C), Mostly Clear
Team	1	2	3	4	5	6	7	8	9	R	H	E
Kansas City	0	0	0	1	0	0	0	0	0	1	10	3
Oakland	1	0	1	2	0	0	0	0	X	4	7	0
WP: Rick Langford (1–0) LP: Larry Gura (0–1) Sv: Dave Beard (1); Home runs: KC: None; OAK: Dave McKay (1); Attendance: 40,002; Boxscore

Game 3 pitted Larry Gura against Rick Langford. With their backs to the wall, the Royals and Gura ran into trouble in the first. Tony Armas would come through once again with another RBI hit that scored Rickey Henderson. Then an error by Frank White in the third allowed another run to score to make it 2–0 A's. The Royals would scratch out a run in the fourth on Amos Otis's forceout. But in the bottom of fourth the A's scored two runs on a Dave McKay homer and an RBI double by Dwayne Murphy. Langford would allow only one run in 7 1/3 innings despite giving up ten hits. Dave Beard would close out the series with a save in the ninth.

=== Composite box ===
1981 ALDS (3–0): Oakland Athletics over Kansas City Royals

Team	1	2	3	4	5	6	7	8	9	R	H	E
Oakland Athletics	2	0	1	5	0	0	0	2	0	10	25	3
Kansas City Royals	0	0	0	1	1	0	0	0	0	2	20	4
Total attendance: 120,868 Average attendance: 40,289

== New York vs. Milwaukee ==
=== Game 1 ===
Wednesday, October 7, 1981 7:10 pm (CT) at County Stadium in Milwaukee, Wisconsin 43 °F (6 °C), Clear
Team	1	2	3	4	5	6	7	8	9	R	H	E
New York	0	0	0	4	0	0	0	0	1	5	13	1
Milwaukee	0	1	1	0	1	0	0	0	0	3	8	3
WP: Ron Davis (1–0) LP: Moose Haas (0–1) Sv: Goose Gossage (1); Home runs: NYY: Oscar Gamble (1); MIL: None; Attendance: 35,064; Boxscore

Milwaukee (then Braves) and New York faced off in their first October meeting since the 1958 World Series.

In Game 1, Ron Guidry faced Moose Haas. In the bottom of the second, the Brewers struck first on Charlie Moore's RBI single. Then Robin Yount's sac fly made it 2–0 in the third. But the Yankees would break through and take the lead for good in the fourth. Designated hitter Oscar Gamble tied the game with a two-run homer. Then the Yanks would take the lead on a two-run double by Rick Cerone. But the Brewers would cut the lead in half with an RBI single by Ted Simmons. In the ninth, the Yankees managed to score a pivotal run off Rollie Fingers. The run scored due to an error by Yount. Goose Gossage shut the door in the ninth.

=== Game 2 ===
Thursday, October 8, 1981 2:10 pm (CT) at County Stadium in Milwaukee, Wisconsin 51 °F (11 °C), Clear
Team	1	2	3	4	5	6	7	8	9	R	H	E
New York	0	0	0	1	0	0	0	0	2	3	7	0
Milwaukee	0	0	0	0	0	0	0	0	0	0	7	0
WP: Dave Righetti (1–0) LP: Mike Caldwell (0–1) Sv: Goose Gossage (2); Home runs: NYY: Lou Piniella (1), Reggie Jackson (1); MIL: None; Attendance: 26,395; Boxscore

Dave Righetti faced Mike Caldwell in Game 2. The Brewers needed to win this game to stay in contention and it certainly looked good with Caldwell having allowed only run in the fourth on Lou Piniella's homer. But the decision to allow Caldwell pitch the ninth proved costly as he surrendered a two-run homer to Reggie Jackson. Dave Winfield collected three hits while Righetti pitched a dominant four-hit shutout for six innings and Goose Gossage got his second consecutive save.

=== Game 3 ===
Friday, October 9, 1981 8:10 pm (ET) at Yankee Stadium in Bronx, New York 54 °F (12 °C), Overcast
Team	1	2	3	4	5	6	7	8	9	R	H	E
Milwaukee	0	0	0	0	0	0	3	2	0	5	9	0
New York	0	0	0	1	0	0	2	0	0	3	8	2
WP: Rollie Fingers (1–0) LP: Tommy John (0–1); Home runs: MIL: Ted Simmons (1), Paul Molitor (1); NYY: None; Attendance: 56,411; Boxscore

Randy Lerch faced Tommy John, who was looking to end the series with a sweep. Both pitchers were on their game and John got a run in the fourth thanks to Bob Watson's RBI hit. The Yankees were closing in on a sweep in the seventh when the Brewers came back. Ted Simmons gave the Brewers the lead thanks to his two-run homer. Then Sal Bando's RBI hit made it 3–1. The Yankees would waste little time in responding as back-to-back RBI singles tied the game in the bottom of the seventh. But Paul Molitor's leadoff homer in the eighth seemed to turn the tide as John then allowed a single to Robin Yount. His night was done but Simmons came through once again with an RBI double to make it 5–3 Brewers. Rollie Fingers won in relief and slammed the door on the Yankees in the ninth. The Brewers' win in Game 3 was their first ever postseason win.

=== Game 4 ===
Saturday, October 10, 1981 4:10 pm (ET) at Yankee Stadium in Bronx, New York 58 °F (14 °C), Partly Cloudy
Team	1	2	3	4	5	6	7	8	9	R	H	E
Milwaukee	0	0	0	2	0	0	0	0	0	2	4	2
New York	0	0	0	0	0	1	0	0	0	1	5	0
WP: Pete Vuckovich (1–0) LP: Rick Reuschel (0–1) Sv: Rollie Fingers (1); Home runs: MIL: none NYY: none Attendance: 52,077; Boxscore

Having taken Game 3, the Brewers looked to Pete Vuckovich to take Game 4. Opposing him would be Rick Reuschel. In the top of the fourth, the Brewers jumped in front 2–0 on a sac fly by Cecil Cooper and an RBI double by Ben Oglivie. The Yankees would get a run in the sixth on a fielder's choice by Lou Piniella. The Yankees would get chances in the seventh and ninth to win the series but Rollie Fingers escaped with the save and evened the series at two games apiece.

=== Game 5 ===
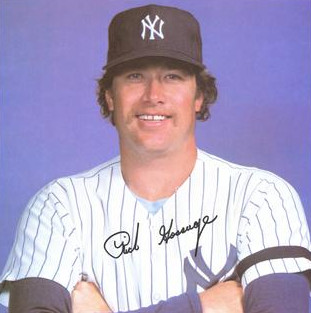
Goose Gossage earned his third save of the series in Game 5.

Sunday, October 11, 1981 7:10 pm (ET) at Yankee Stadium in Bronx, New York 57 °F (14 °C), Partly Cloudy
Team	1	2	3	4	5	6	7	8	9	R	H	E
Milwaukee	0	1	1	0	0	0	1	0	0	3	8	0
New York	0	0	0	4	0	0	1	2	X	7	13	0
WP: Dave Righetti (2–0) LP: Moose Haas (0–2) Sv: Goose Gossage (3); Home runs: MIL: Gorman Thomas (1); NYY: Reggie Jackson (2), Oscar Gamble (2), Rick Cerone (1); Attendance: 47,505; Boxscore

No team had ever come back down two games to none with their first two losses on the road. The Yankees started Ron Guidry while the Brewers went with Moose Haas. Guidry allowed single runs in the 2nd and 3rd on Gorman Thomas' homer and Cecil Cooper's sacrifice fly, respectively. The Yankees looked helpless until the bottom of the fourth. Reggie Jackson's titanic two-run home run in the fourth tied the game. Oscar Gamble followed Jackson's homer with a homer to give the Yankees a 3–2 lead. A forceout later in the inning scored Graig Nettles to make it 4–2. Dave Righetti relieved Guidry after the 4th and held the Brewers in check. Milwaukee would strike in the seventh on Cooper's second RBI of the game to close the gap. That was as close as they would get. Rick Cerone's homer in the seventh made it 5–3. The Brewers mounted a threat in the eighth. After recording two quick outs Goose Gossage walked Bando and Howell before getting Don Money to fly out to deep left. A double and a sacrifice fly put the series away as the Yankees took a commanding 7–3 lead to the ninth. Gossage shut the Brewers out in the ninth for his third save of the series and to keep a historic collapse from happening.

=== Composite box ===
1981 ALDS (3–2): New York Yankees over Milwaukee Brewers

Team	1	2	3	4	5	6	7	8	9	R	H	E
New York Yankees	0	0	0	10	0	1	3	2	3	19	46	3
Milwaukee Brewers	0	2	2	2	1	0	4	2	0	13	36	5
Total attendance: 217,452 Average attendance: 43,490
