= Mike Patterson (baseball) =

American baseball player (born 1958)

- Outfielder
- Born: January 26, 1958 (age 68); Santa Monica, California, U.S.
- Batted: Left Threw: Right

Professional debut
- MLB: April 15, 1981, for the Oakland Athletics
- NPB: April 6, 1985, for the Nippon-Ham Fighters

Last appearance
- MLB: October 3, 1982, for the New York Yankees
- NPB: October 7, 1985, for the Nippon-Ham Fighters

MLB statistics
- Batting average: .271
- Home runs: 1
- Runs batted in: 2

NPB statistics
- Batting average: .225
- Home runs: 16
- Runs batted in: 44
- Stats at Baseball Reference

Teams
- Oakland Athletics (1981); New York Yankees (1981–1982); Nippon-Ham Fighters (1985)

Michael Lee Patterson (born January 26, 1958) is an American former Major League Baseball outfielder. Patterson played for the Oakland Athletics and the New York Yankees in 1981 and 1982. He batted left and threw right-handed.

He was signed by the Athletics as an amateur free agent in 1975. He was traded along with Dave Revering and minor-league left-handed pitcher Chuck Dougherty from the Athletics to the Yankees for Jim Spencer and Tom Underwood on May 20, 1981.

Patterson attended Dorsey High School in Los Angeles, California.
