= Shooty Babitt =

American baseball player

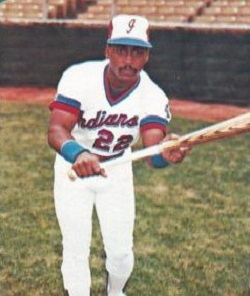
- Babitt in 1984
- Second baseman
- Born: March 9, 1959 (age 67); Oakland, California, U.S.
- Batted: Right Threw: Right

MLB debut
- April 9, 1981, for the Oakland Athletics

Last MLB appearance
- September 4, 1981, for the Oakland Athletics

MLB statistics
- Batting average: .256
- Home runs: 0
- Runs batted in: 14
- Stats at Baseball Reference

Teams
- Oakland Athletics (1981)

Mack Neal "Shooty" Babitt (born March 9, 1959) is an American former second baseman who played for the Oakland Athletics during the 1981 Major League Baseball (MLB) season. After retiring as a player, Babitt became a baseball scout, and later worked as a television analyst.

Per his 1982 Donruss baseball card, his nickname "Shooty" came from his father hearing a local DJ use the name.

== Career ==
Babitt was drafted by the Oakland Athletics in the 25th round of the 1977 Major League Baseball draft. He began his career with a seven-game hitting streak, the second longest such streak in Oakland A's history. For his career, Babitt played in 54 major league games in 1981, hitting .256 in 156 at bats. Oakland manager Billy Martin later commented, "If you ever see Shooty Babitt play second base for me again, I want you to Shooty me."

Babitt was a long-time advance scout for the Arizona Diamondbacks, and since 2008, he has been a scout for the New York Mets. Additionally, since 2008, he has worked as a television color analyst on the pre- and post-game shows for Oakland A's home games on NBC Sports California. Beginning in 2014, he has also substituted for game analyst Ray Fosse on 20 A's games per season.

His son, Zach Babitt was selected by the Los Angeles Dodgers in the 10th round of the 2012 Major League Baseball draft.
