= 1981 American League Championship Series =

13th edition of Major League Baseball's American League Championship Series

Team (Wins)	Managers	Season
New York Yankees (3)	Bob Lemon	34–22, .607, GA: 2 (1st half); 25–26, .490, GB: 5 (2nd half)
Oakland Athletics (0)	Billy Martin	37–23, .617, GA: 1½ (1st half); 27–22, .551, GB: 1 (2nd half)
- Dates: October 13–15
- MVP: Graig Nettles (New York)
- Umpires: Nick Bremigan; Russ Goetz; Jerry Neudecker; Marty Springstead; Durwood Merrill; Vic Voltaggio

Broadcast
- Television: NBC; KPIX (OAK); WPIX (NYY)
- TV announcers: NBC: Joe Garagiola and Tony Kubek; KPIX: Bill King and Wayne Walker; WPIX: Frank Messer, Phil Rizzuto and Bill White
- Radio: CBS
- Radio announcers: Ernie Harwell and Curt Gowdy
- ALDS: Oakland Athletics over Kansas City Royals (3–0); New York Yankees over Milwaukee Brewers (3–2)

The 1981 American League Championship Series was a best-of-five playoff baseball series in Major League Baseball's 1981 postseason played between the American League East champion New York Yankees and the American League West champion Oakland Athletics from October 13–15 to determine the American League champion for the 1981 Major League Baseball season. The Yankees swept the Athletics three games to none to win their 33rd American League pennant in franchise history. New York advanced to face the Los Angeles Dodgers in the World Series, but lost in six games.

== Background ==
The 1981 Major League Baseball season had been interrupted by a players' strike from June 12 to August 10, forcing the cancellation of 713 regular-season games, or 38 percent of the schedule. As a result of this unique situation, the MLB team owners met at the O'Hare Hilton in Chicago on August 6 and decided to split the season into two halves. The teams that finished in first place in their respective divisions in each half of the season would face each other in the American League Division Series (ALDS) and National League Division Series (NLDS) to determine the champions of each of the four MLB divisions – the American League East, American League West, National League East, and National League West. If the same team finished first in a division in both halves of a season, the first-half winner would play the team with the second-best overall record. The winners of these series would meet in the American League Championship Series (ALCS) and National League Championship Series (NLCS) to determine the league champions, who would play each other in the World Series.

The Yankees had finished in first place in the American League East in the first half of the season with a 59-48 record, while the Milwaukee Brewers finished first in the AL East in the second half with a 62-47 mark. In the American League West, the Athletics clinched the first-half title with a record of 64-45, and the Kansas City Royals claimed the second-half crown with a 50-53 record. This meant that the Yankees would play the Brewers in one ALDS, while the Athletics would face the Royals in the other ALDS.

The Yankees almost blew a 2-0 series lead to Milwaukee in their ALDS, but prevailed in the deciding Game 5 at home. In the other ALDS, Oakland's superb pitching staff of Mike Norris, Steve McCatty, and Rick Langford allowed the Royals only two runs total as they swept aside Kansas City in three straight games. This set the stage for an ALCS clash between the East champion Yankees and the West champion Athletics.

A major storyline heading into the series was the former Yankee player and manager, and current Athletics manager, Billy Martin, coaching against the team that had fired him in 1979.

== Summary ==
=== Oakland Athletics vs. New York Yankees ===
New York won the series, 3–0.

Game	Date	Score	Location	Time	Attendance
1	October 13	Oakland Athletics – 1, New York Yankees – 3	Yankee Stadium (I)	2:52	55,740
2	October 14	Oakland Athletics – 3, New York Yankees – 13	Yankee Stadium (I)	3:08	48,497
3	October 15	New York Yankees – 4, Oakland Athletics – 0	Oakland-Alameda County Coliseum	3:19	47,302

== Game summaries ==
=== Game 1 ===
October 13, 1981 8:00 pm (ET) at Yankee Stadium in Bronx, New York 53 °F (12 °C), clear
Team	1	2	3	4	5	6	7	8	9	R	H	E
Oakland	0	0	0	0	1	0	0	0	0	1	6	1
New York	3	0	0	0	0	0	0	0	X	3	7	1
WP: Tommy John (1–0) LP: Mike Norris (0–1) Sv: Goose Gossage (1)

In Billy Martin's return to Yankee Stadium (for the first time since the Yankees fired him in 1979), the Yankees drew first blood in front of their old skipper. Graig Nettles' three-run bases-loaded double in the first inning was all the run support that Tommy John needed.

John gave way to Ron Davis after six innings. Davis had an easy seventh, but the A's mounted a threat in the eighth where Martin tried some of his "Billyball" tactics. After Dwayne Murphy walked with one out, Davis ran up a 1–2 count on the next batter, Cliff Johnson. During the at-bat, Johnson stepped in and out of the batter's box (on Martin's orders) on each pitch to break Davis' rhythm. After fouling off a pitch, Johnson showed his bat to plate umpire Nick Bremigan and asked to get a new one. Johnson walked slowly to and from the A's dugout, taking his time getting a new bat, and Bremigan ordered him to get back to the plate more quickly. Once at the plate, Johnson stepped out one more time, and Bremigan ordered him back in, prompting an argument from Johnson. Yankee manager Bob Lemon came out of the dugout as well. Bremigan then ordered Johnson into the batter's box, but also ordered Davis to resume pitching immediately. This, in turn, infuriated Davis, who was angry that Johnson had delayed the game so long. Both Graig Nettles and Lemon tried to calm Davis down, and Bremigan exacerbated the situation by charging Lemon with a mound visit. A clearly rattled Davis threw two pitches well out of the strike zone, after which Yankee catcher Rick Cerone came out to talk to Davis. Davis then threw ball four to walk Johnson and called Cerone out again to talk (presumably to give closer Goose Gossage time to warm up). Martin then stormed out of the dugout to protest Davis' actions. Lemon then returned from the dugout to the mound and removed Davis (as MLB rules require on a second mound visit in an inning) and brought in Gossage earlier than expected to face Tony Armas. Armas, the A's leading home run and RBI man in 1981, was now at bat with the tying runs on base with less than 2 outs. Gossage retired Armas and Wayne Gross to end the inning and closed out the win the rest of the way.

=== Game 2 ===
October 14, 1981 2:00 pm (ET) at Yankee Stadium in Bronx, New York 63 °F (17 °C) sunny
Team	1	2	3	4	5	6	7	8	9	R	H	E
Oakland	0	0	1	2	0	0	0	0	0	3	11	1
New York	1	0	0	7	0	1	4	0	X	13	19	0
WP: George Frazier (1–0) LP: Steve McCatty (0–1); Home runs: OAK: None; NYY: Lou Piniella (1), Graig Nettles (1)

The Yankees struck first in Game 2 on Reggie Jackson's RBI groundout in the bottom of the first with runners on first and second off of American League ERA leader Steve McCatty, but Oakland tied the score in the third when Rick Bosetti hit a leadoff double and scored on Rickey Henderson's one-out triple. Next inning, three consecutive one-out singles put Oakland up 2–1 and knock Yankees' starter Rudy May out of the game. George Frazier intentionally walked Keith Drumright before Fred Stanley's RBI single made it 3–1 Oakland, who were poised to tie the series going home. It could have been worse, but Dave Winfield made a leaping catch in the second to rob Tony Armas of a homer.

But, Graig Nettles led off the bottom of the fourth with a single and Rick Cerone was hit by a McCatty pitch with one out. After Willie Randolph singled in Nettles, Jerry Mumphrey walked. Dave Beard came on in relief and proceeded to give up an RBI single to Larry Milbourne, a two-run double to Winfield, and a three-run homer to Lou Piniella. Beard gave up two more hits and loaded the bases after that, but Cerone flied out to end the disastrous inning. The Yankees now led 8–3.

In the sixth, the Yankees added another run on an RBI single by Bob Watson off of Jeff Jones after a walk and hit-by-pitch. Next inning, they loaded the bases on three singles with one out off of Brian Kingman. Oscar Gamble's sacrifice fly scored a run off of Bob Owchinko before Graig Nettles capped the scoring with a three-run home run to make it 13–3 Yankees. Frazier pitched 5 2/3 innings in relief to earn the win as the Yankees took a 2–0 series lead.

=== Game 3 ===
October 15, 1981 5:00 pm (PT) at Oakland-Alameda County Coliseum in Oakland, California 66 °F (19 °C) clear
Team	1	2	3	4	5	6	7	8	9	R	H	E
New York	0	0	0	0	0	1	0	0	3	4	10	0
Oakland	0	0	0	0	0	0	0	0	0	0	5	2
WP: Dave Righetti (1–0) LP: Matt Keough (0–1); Home runs: NYY: Willie Randolph (1); OAK: None

Prior to the game, Bob Lemon inexplicably dropped Willie Randolph from the leadoff spot in the batting order to ninth. Randolph kept any ill feelings to himself and broke a scoreless pitching duel between Dave Righetti and Matt Keough with a homer in the sixth. That run would be all Righetti would need through six innings. Series MVP Graig Nettles plated three more runs in the ninth with a bases-loaded double resulting when A's center fielder Rick Bosetti turned the wrong way on his fly ball.

Dave Righetti pitched six shutout innings and Ron Davis pitched two scoreless innings before giving way to Goose Gossage, who retired the side in the ninth to clinch the pennant.

The most widely accepted debut of "the wave" at a major League baseball game occurred during Game 3, led by Krazy George Henderson.

== Composite box ==
1981 ALCS (3–0): New York Yankees over Oakland Athletics

Team	1	2	3	4	5	6	7	8	9	R	H	E
New York Yankees	4	0	0	7	0	2	4	0	3	20	36	1
Oakland Athletics	0	0	1	2	1	0	0	0	0	4	22	4
Total attendance: 151,539 Average attendance: 50,513
