= Jim Spencer =

American baseball player (1947–2002)

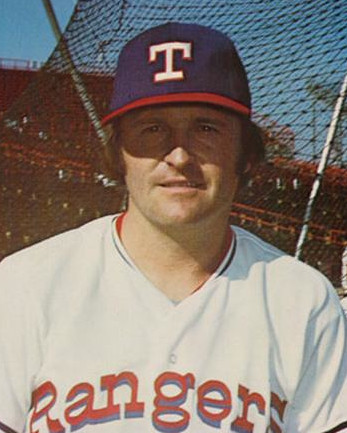
- First baseman
- Born: July 30, 1947; Hanover, Pennsylvania, U.S.
- Died: February 10, 2002 (aged 54); Fort Lauderdale, Florida, U.S.
- Batted: Left Threw: Left

MLB debut
- September 7, 1968, for the California Angels

Last MLB appearance
- June 20, 1982, for the Oakland Athletics

MLB statistics
- Batting average: .250
- Home runs: 146
- Runs batted in: 599
- Stats at Baseball Reference

Teams
- California Angels (1968–1973); Texas Rangers (1973–1975); Chicago White Sox (1976–1977); New York Yankees (1978–1981); Oakland Athletics (1981–1982)

Career highlights and awards
- All-Star (1973); World Series champion (1978); 2× Gold Glove Award (1970, 1977)

James Lloyd Spencer (July 30, 1947 – February 10, 2002) was an American Major League Baseball first baseman. Born in Hanover, Pennsylvania, the left-handed Spencer was recognized for his excellent fielding ability, but also served in later years as a designated hitter.

== Early years ==
Spencer was drafted by the California Angels in the first round (11th overall) of the 1965 Major League Baseball draft upon graduation from Andover High School in Linthicum, Maryland. After batting .292 with 28 home runs and 96 runs batted in for the El Paso Sun Kings in 1968, Spencer earned a September call-up to the Angels. In nineteen games, he batted .191 with no home runs and five RBIs.

== California Angels ==
Spencer began the 1969 season assigned to the Hawaii Islanders, but with former All-Star Dick Stuart not panning out at first base, he was back with the Angels by May. In just his second start of the season, he went four-for-five against the Baltimore Orioles. For the season, he batted .254 with ten home runs and 31 RBIs.

While Spencer's offensive numbers improved in 1970, his fielding improved more-so, as he led the American League with 1,212 putouts at first and a .995 fielding percentage to win the Gold Glove award.

Injuries limited Spencer to 82 games in 1972.

== Texas Rangers ==
Spencer was dealt along with Lloyd Allen from the Angels to the Texas Rangers for Mike Epstein, Rich Hand and Rick Stelmaszek on May 20, 1973. He was batting .300 for the Rangers when he was named to the AL All-Star team. He had one at-bat in the game, and flew out to left field. Despite the fact that Spencer committed just one error in 1973 and one in 1974, he began seeing more time at DH with Mike Hargrove assuming most of the first base duties. He regained the first base job in 1975 with Hargrove shifting to left field. By the start of the following season, Hargrove was shifted back to his natural position.

== Chicago White Sox ==
Spencer was traded twice in as many days at the 1975 Winter Meetings. He returned to the Angels along with $100,000 in exchange for Bill Singer on December 10. The reunion lasted only a day as he was sent with Morris Nettles to the Chicago White Sox for Bill Melton and Steve Dunning on December 11. In 1976, Spencer had career highs in hits (131), RBIs (70) and stolen bases (6). He played 143 games, and only had 2 errors throughout the season, turning 116 double plays, good for a .998 fielding percentage.

On May 14, 1977, Spencer enjoyed a two home run, eight RBI game against the Cleveland Indians. He followed that up with a second two home run, eight RBI game on July 2 against the Minnesota Twins. For the season, he batted .247 with eighteen home runs and 69 RBIs, and won his second career Gold Glove.

== New York Yankees ==
Spencer was acquired along with Tommy Cruz by the New York Yankees from the White Sox for Stan Thomas and cash on December 12, 1977. The transaction also included an exchange of minor-league right‐handed pitcher with Ed Ricks going to the White Sox and Bob Polinsky to the Yankees. While backing up Chris Chambliss at first base, he saw most of his playing time at DH in New York. He reached the post-season for the first time in his career in 1978. Spencer did not appear in the 1978 American League Championship Series against the Kansas City Royals; however, he appeared in four of the six games of the World Series, and had two hits in twelve at-bats.

Spencer's career high in home runs (23) came in 1979 with the Yankees, in a year that he only got 295 at-bats. He only had 85 hits on the season, 41 of which were for extra bases, giving him a .593 slugging percentage. Perhaps his most memorable at-bat of the season took place on July 13 against Nolan Ryan. Ryan had a no-hitter going when Spencer hit a drive to center field in the eighth inning. Centerfielder Rick Miller made a diving attempt at the ball, but could not handle it. The official scorer ruled it an error. Reggie Jackson officially ended Ryan's no-hit bid in the ninth.

During spring training 1981, Spencer was dealt to the Pittsburgh Pirates for Jason Thompson, however the trade was nixed by Commissioner Bowie Kuhn.

Spencer was traded along with Tom Underwood from the Yankees to the Oakland Athletics for Dave Revering, Mike Patterson and minor-league left-handed pitcher Chuck Dougherty on May 20, 1981. He batted only .191 while in Oakland, and was released early in the 1982 season.

== Career stats ==
Seasons	Games	AB	Runs	Hits	2B	3B	HR	RBI	SB	BB	SO	Avg.	Slg.	Fld%
15	1553	4908	541	1227	179	27	146	599	11	407	582	.250	.387	.995

In 1973, Spencer had a .999 fielding percentage, with one error in the 125 games he played at first base. The next year, he had one error in 60 games at first base for a .998 fielding percentage.

== Death ==
On February 10, 2002, Spencer died of a heart attack in Fort Lauderdale, Florida, at the age of 54. The night before his death, Spencer played first base in a charity baseball game benefiting the Joe DiMaggio Children's Hospital in Hollywood, Florida. He was buried at the Mount Pleasant United Methodist Church Cemetery in Taneytown, Maryland.
