= Rickey Keeton =

American baseball player (born 1957)

- Pitcher
- Born: March 18, 1957 (age 69); Cincinnati, Ohio, U.S.
- Batted: Right Threw: Right

MLB debut
- May 27, 1980, for the Milwaukee Brewers

Last MLB appearance
- August 25, 1981, for the Milwaukee Brewers

MLB statistics
- Win–loss record: 3–2
- Earned run average: 4.95
- Strikeouts: 17
- Stats at Baseball Reference

Teams
- Milwaukee Brewers (1980–1981)

Rickey Keeton (born March 18, 1957) is an American former professional baseball right-handed pitcher. Keeton attended Western Hills High School in Cincinnati and Southern Illinois University in Carbondale, Illinois. He was picked in the third round of the 1978 amateur draft and pitched parts of two seasons in Major League Baseball (MLB) for the Milwaukee Brewers.

== Sources ==
- Career statistics from Baseball Reference · Baseball Reference (Minors) · Retrosheet · Baseball Almanac, or Retrosheet
