= Kelvin Moore (baseball) =

American baseball player (1957–2014)

- First baseman
- Born: September 26, 1957; Leroy, Alabama, U.S.
- Died: November 9, 2014 (aged 57); Covington, Georgia, U.S.
- Batted: Right Threw: Left

MLB debut
- August 28, 1981, for the Oakland Athletics

Last MLB appearance
- June 2, 1983, for the Oakland Athletics

MLB statistics
- Batting average: .223
- Home runs: 8
- Runs batted in: 25
- Stats at Baseball Reference

Teams
- Oakland Athletics (1981–1983)

Kelvin Orlando Moore (September 26, 1957 – November 9, 2014) was an American Major League Baseball (MLB) first baseman. He played parts of three seasons in the major leagues, from 1981 until 1983, for the Oakland Athletics. He attended Leroy High School and Jackson State University, where he was drafted in the sixth round of the 1978 MLB draft. He died on November 9, 2014.
