= 1981 Major League Baseball All-Star Game =

1981 American baseball competition

	1	2	3	4	5	6	7	8	9	R	H	E
National League	0	0	0	0	1	1	1	2	0	5	9	1
American League	0	1	0	0	0	3	0	0	0	4	11	1
- Date: August 9, 1981
- Venue: Cleveland Stadium
- City: Cleveland, Ohio
- Managers: Dallas Green (PHI); Jim Frey (KC)
- MVP: Gary Carter (MON)
- Attendance: 72,086
- Ceremonial first pitch: Vice President George H. W. Bush
- Television: NBC
- TV announcers: Joe Garagiola, Tony Kubek and Bryant Gumbel
- Radio: CBS
- Radio announcers: Vin Scully, Win Elliot and Herb Score

The 1981 Major League Baseball All-Star Game was the 52nd playing of the midsummer classic between the all-stars of the American League (AL) and National League (NL), the two leagues comprising Major League Baseball. The game was held on Sunday, August 9, 1981, at Cleveland Stadium in Cleveland, Ohio, the home of the Cleveland Indians of the American League. As of 2024, it is the only MLB All-Star Game that was played on a Sunday.

This was one of only two All-Star Games to be played outside the month of July (the other being the second 1959 game). The game was originally to be played on Tuesday, July 14, but was cancelled due to the players' strike lasting from June 12 to July 31. It was then brought back as a prelude to the second half of the season, which began the following day. At 72,086 people in attendance, it broke the stadium's own record of 69,751 set in 1954, setting the still-standing record for the highest attendance in an All Star Game.

Cleveland Stadium set a new All-Star Game record by hosting its fourth (and ultimately, final) Midsummer Classic. By the time Indians played host to the All-Star Game for the fifth time in 1997, they had moved to Progressive Field (then known as Jacobs Field), where they also hosted the 2019 game. Cleveland Stadium's record still stands, though the original Yankee Stadium would host its fourth and final All-Star Game in 2008, while Wrigley Field will host its fourth All-Star Game in 2027.

== Rosters ==
Players in italics have since been inducted into the National Baseball Hall of Fame.

=== National League ===
Starters
Position	Player	Team	All-Star Games
P	Fernando Valenzuela	Dodgers	1
C	Gary Carter	Expos	4
1B	Pete Rose	Phillies	15
2B	Davey Lopes	Dodgers	4
3B	Mike Schmidt	Phillies	6
SS	Dave Concepción	Reds	8
OF	Andre Dawson	Expos	1
OF	George Foster	Reds	5
OF	Dave Parker	Pirates	4

Pitchers
Position	Player	Team	All-Star Games
P	Vida Blue	Giants	6
P	Steve Carlton	Phillies	9
P	Burt Hooton	Dodgers	1
P	Bob Knepper	Astros	1
P	Dick Ruthven	Phillies	2
P	Nolan Ryan	Astros	6
P	Tom Seaver	Reds	12
P	Bruce Sutter	Cardinals	5

Reserves
Position	Player	Team	All-Star Games
C	Bruce Benedict	Braves	1
C	Terry Kennedy	Padres	1
1B	Bill Buckner	Cubs	1
1B	Steve Garvey	Dodgers	8
2B	Phil Garner	Pirates	3
2B	Manny Trillo	Phillies	2
3B	Bill Madlock	Pirates	2
SS	Ozzie Smith	Padres	1
OF	Dusty Baker	Dodgers	1
OF	Mike Easler	Pirates	1
OF	Pedro Guerrero	Dodgers	1
OF	Tim Raines	Expos	1
OF	Joel Youngblood	Mets	1

=== American League ===
Starters
Position	Player	Team	All-Star Games
P	Jack Morris	Tigers	1
C	Carlton Fisk	White Sox	8
1B	Rod Carew	Angels	15
2B	Willie Randolph	Yankees	4
3B	George Brett	Royals	6
SS	Bucky Dent	Yankees	3
OF	Reggie Jackson	Yankees	11
OF	Ken Singleton	Orioles	3
OF	Dave Winfield	Yankees	5

Pitchers
Position	Player	Team	All-Star Games
P	Len Barker	Indians	1
P	Britt Burns	White Sox	1
P	Doug Corbett	Twins	1
P	Ron Davis	Yankees	1
P	Rollie Fingers	Brewers	6
P	Ken Forsch	Angels	2
P	Rich Gossage	Yankees	6
P	Scott McGregor	Orioles	1
P	Mike Norris	Athletics	1
P	Dave Stieb	Blue Jays	2

Reserves
Position	Player	Team	All-Star Games
C	Bo Díaz	Indians	1
C	Ted Simmons	Brewers	7
1B	Eddie Murray	Orioles	2
1B	Al Oliver	Rangers	5
2B	Frank White	Royals	3
3B	Buddy Bell	Rangers	3
SS	Rick Burleson	Angels	4
OF	Tony Armas	Athletics	1
OF	Dwight Evans	Red Sox	2
OF	Fred Lynn	Angels	7
OF	Tom Paciorek	Mariners	1
OF	Gorman Thomas	Brewers	1

== Game ==
=== Umpires ===
Home plate	Bill Haller (AL)
First base	Ed Vargo (NL)
Second base	Lou DiMuro (AL)
Third base	Bob Engel (NL)
Left field	Greg Kosc (AL)
Right field	Jim Quick (NL)

=== Starting lineups ===
National League				American League			
Order	Player	Team	Position	Order	Player	Team	Position
1	Pete Rose	Phillies	1B	1	Rod Carew	Angels	1B
2	Dave Concepción	Reds	SS	2	Willie Randolph	Yankees	2B
3	Dave Parker	Pirates	RF	3	George Brett	Royals	3B
4	Mike Schmidt	Phillies	3B	4	Dave Winfield	Yankees	CF
5	George Foster	Reds	LF	5	Ken Singleton	Orioles	LF
6	Andre Dawson	Expos	CF	6	Reggie Jackson	Yankees	RF
7	Gary Carter	Expos	C	7	Carlton Fisk	White Sox	C
8	Davey Lopes	Dodgers	2B	8	Bucky Dent	Yankees	SS
9	Fernando Valenzuela	Dodgers	P	9	Jack Morris	Tigers	P

=== Game summary ===
Sunday, August 9, 1981 8:25 pm (ET) at Cleveland Stadium in Cleveland, Ohio
Team	1	2	3	4	5	6	7	8	9	R	H	E
National League	0	0	0	0	1	1	1	2	0	5	9	1
American League	0	1	0	0	0	3	0	0	0	4	11	1
WP: Vida Blue (1-0) LP: Rollie Fingers (0-1) Sv: Bruce Sutter (1); Home runs: NL: Gary Carter 2 (1, 2), Dave Parker (1), Mike Schmidt (1); AL: Ken Singleton (1)

The American League started with four shutout innings, two apiece by starter Jack Morris and Len Barker. Meanwhile, Fernando Valenzuela, only the second rookie pitcher to start an All-Star Game, pitched a scoreless first with two strikeouts. The AL got on the board in the second when Ken Singleton homered off Tom Seaver.

Gary Carter broke the scoring drought for the NL and tied the game with a shot off Ken Forsch in the fifth. Dave Parker gave the senior circuit the lead with a homer in the sixth off Mike Norris.

Burt Hooton came in for the NL in the AL-half of the sixth and promptly loaded the bases on three successive singles by Singleton, Dwight Evans, and Carlton Fisk. Fred Lynn lined another single, but only Singleton came home to tie it at 2-2. Buddy Bell followed with a sacrifice fly to give the AL a 3-2 lead. Eddie Murray then bounced what looked to be a double-play grounder to Steve Garvey at first, but Garvey's low throw combined with a great play by Ozzie Smith at second and a rolling slide by Lynn resulted in only a force at second. Fisk went to third and Ted Simmons singled him in to make it 4-2. Al Oliver then lifted a bloop fly ball to left that looked like it would drop, but Dusty Baker hustled in and made a sliding catch for the third out, saving a run and possibly more.

In the seventh, Carter got one of the runs back with his second homer, this one off Ron Davis. Then, in the eighth, Rollie Fingers walked Ozzie Smith. Smith stole second and attempted to take third when Bo Díaz' throw went into center field. Dave Winfield hustled the ball back to the infield and Smith was caught in a rundown and tagged out by Fingers. Mike Easler walked and Mike Schmidt homered off Fingers to give the National League their winning runs.
