= Jimmy Sexton (baseball) =

American baseball player (born 1951)

- Infielder
- Born: December 15, 1951 (age 74); Mobile, Alabama, U.S.
- Batted: Right Threw: Right

MLB debut
- September 2, 1977, for the Seattle Mariners

Last MLB appearance
- October 2, 1983, for the St. Louis Cardinals

MLB statistics
- Batting average: .218
- Home runs: 5
- Runs batted in: 24
- Stolen bases: 36
- Stats at Baseball Reference

Teams
- Seattle Mariners (1977); Houston Astros (1978–1979); Oakland Athletics (1981–1982); St. Louis Cardinals (1983)

Jimmy Dale Sexton (born December 15, 1951) is an American former professional baseball infielder. He played in Major League Baseball (MLB) for the Seattle Mariners, Houston Astros, Oakland Athletics, and St. Louis Cardinals. Sexton signed his first professional contract with the Pittsburgh Pirates in 1970. In his minor league career, Sexton batted .282 with 951 hits in 3,373 at-bats, and 137 doubles, 36 triples, and 30 home runs. In his major league career, Sexton batted .218 with 81 hits in 372 at-bats, with 9 doubles, 3 triples, 5 home runs, 24 RBIs, and 36 stolen bases.

== Professional career ==
=== Pittsburgh Pirates ===
Sexton began his professional career within the Pittsburgh Pirates organization, playing for the rookie-level GCL Pirates of the Gulf Coast League in 1970. He batted .283 with 2 doubles in 33 games. The next season, Sexton continued to play for the GCL Pirates. He batted .244 with 2 doubles, and 1 triple in 35 games. In 1972, Sexton was promoted to the short-season Niagara Falls Pirates of the New York–Penn League. That season, Sexton batted .288 with 2 doubles, and 3 triples in 69 games. Sexton was promoted again to start the 1973 season, this time playing for the Class-A Salem Pirates of the Carolina League. In 124 games, Sexton batted .269 with 17 doubles, 3 triples, and 3 home runs with Salem. The next season, he was promoted to the Double-A Thetford Mines Pirates of the Eastern League. Sexton batted .249 with 14 doubles, 1 triples, 3 home runs, 32 RBIs, and 31 stolen bases. Sexton was fifth in the Eastern League in stolen bases. Sexton stayed at the Double-A level in 1975, this time playing for the Shreveport Captains in the Texas League. He batted .274 with 23 doubles, 5 triples, 3 home runs, 28 RBIs, and 48 stolen bases. That season, Sexton led the Texas League in stolen bases. In 1976, Sexton split the season between the Double-A Shreveport Captains, and the Triple-A Charleston Charlies of the International League. In 59 games at the Double-A level, Sexton batted .324 with 14 doubles, 2 triples, 4 home runs, 30 RBIs, and 11 stolen bases in 207 at-bats. After his promotion to the Triple-A level that season, Sexton batted .273 with 8 doubles, 1 triple, 3 home runs, 12 RBIs, and 13 stolen bases in 49 games.

=== Seattle Mariners ===
On December 7, 1976, the Pirates traded Sexton along with shortstop Craig Reynolds for left-handed pitcher Grant Jackson. Despite making the major league roster in the beginning of the season, Sexton was assigned to the Triple-A San Jose Missions of the Pacific Coast League on April 8, 1977. With the Missions, he batted .256 with 13 doubles, 5 triples, 2 home runs, 23 RBIs, and 52 stolen bases. Sexton was third in the Pacific Coast League in stolen bases that season. As a member of the Mariners' inaugural season, Sexton batted .216 with 1 double, 1 triple, 1 home run, 3 RBIs, and 1 stolen bases in 14 games. Sexton made his major league debut on September 2, against the Toronto Blue Jays and in 4 at-bats, Sexton went without a hit. Sexton's first hit was a single to left field on September 4, against Toronto Blue Jays' pitcher Jerry Garvin. Sexton also hit his first major league home run that game in the 7–2 Mariners' win.

=== Houston Astros ===
Sexton was traded to the Houston Astros for Leon Roberts on December 6, 1977. In his first season with the Astros, 1978, Sexton batted .206 with 3 doubles, 2 triples, 2 home runs, 6 RBIs, and 16 stolen bases. Sexton played shortstop, second base, and third base for the Astros that season. The next season, Sexton again spent the entire season on the major league roster. In 52 games with Houston, Sexton batted .209 with 8 runs, 1 RBIs, 1 stolen bases, and 7 walks in 43 at-bats. In 1980, Sexton was assigned to the Triple-A Tucson Toros of the Pacific Coast League. During his stint with the Toros, Sexton batted .296 with 18 doubles, 6 triples, 1 home runs, 33 RBIs, and 55 stolen bases. He was third in the Pacific Coast League in stolen bases that season, behind Marshall Edwards who had 68 stolen bases, and Kim Allen who had 84 stolen bases.

=== Oakland Athletics ===
The Houston Astros traded Sexton to the Oakland Athletics on February 13, 1981, for a player to be named later or cash considerations. That season, Sexton played for both the Athletics at the major league level and the Triple-A Tacoma Tigers of the Pacific Coast League. He began the season with the Tigers and batted .319 with 16 doubles, 8 triples, 4 home runs, 35 RBIs, and 56 stolen bases. Sexton was tied with Rudy Law for second in the Pacific Coast League in stolen bases, behind Alan Wiggins who had 73 stolen bases. Sexton made his A's debut on September 8, in a game where he replaced Wayne Gross as a pinch runner, and scored a run. After 7 games with the Athletics in 1981, Sexton went hitless and stole 2 bases. In 1982, Sexton again split the season between the Triple-A Tacoma Tigers, and the major league Athletics. With the Tigers, Sexton batted .310 with 4 doubles, 2 home runs, 6 RBIs, and 9 stolen bases. Sexton played his first major league game of the season on April 8. With Oakland, Sexton batted .245 with 4 doubles, 2 home runs, 14 RBIs, and 16 stolen bases. On June 6, 1983, Sexton was designated for assignment, and was later released by the Athletics.

=== Chicago White Sox ===
On June 23, 1983, Sexton was signed by the Chicago White Sox. He played for the Denver Bears, the Triple-A affiliate of the White Sox. On August 10, Sexton was released by the White Sox.

=== St. Louis Cardinals ===
Sexton signed with the St. Louis Cardinals on August 15, 1983, and played for both the Triple-A Louisville Redbirds of the American Association, and the major league Cardinals. Between the Redbirds and the Bears in 1983, Sexton batted .300 with 4 doubles, 1 triple, and 5 home runs. With the Cardinals, Sexton batted .111 in 6 games. The next season, Sexton played with the Triple-A Louisville Redbirds, and batted .217 in 9 games. That season, 1984, would prove to be Sexton's last season in professional baseball.
