= Kent Derdivanis =

American sportscaster

Kent Derdivanis is an American sportscaster.

Derdivanis's career began as a play-by-play announcer for University of Arizona Wildcats football and basketball games. In 1981, Derdivanis was the voice of the Milwaukee Brewers on WVTV. In 1984 he was NESN's first play-by-play announcer for Boston Red Sox games. During his time in Boston he used the name Kent Der Divanis at the insistence of NESN president and general manager Peter Affee. After NESN's inaugural season, the network was able to convince WSBK-TV's broadcast team of Ned Martin and Bob Montgomery to call NESN's games as well, which led to the dismissal of Derdivanis and color commentator Mike Andrews. After being unable to find work in Boston, Derdivanis worked at KMPC, calling UCLA football and basketball. He then returned to Arizona, where he called Wildcats football and basketball and Phoenix Firebirds baseball. Derdivanis left the Wildcats to become a TV and radio broadcaster for the Pittsburgh Pirates. He was let go after the 1993 season and returned to Arizona. Since returning to Arizona he has called games for the Arizona Rattlers, Arizona Cardinals, and Northern Arizona University.
