= Fred Stanley (baseball) =

American baseball player (born 1947)

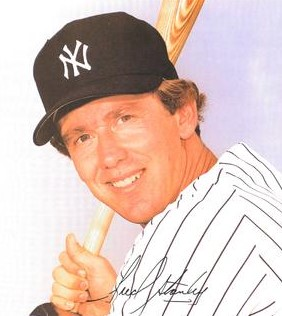
- Shortstop
- Born: August 13, 1947 (age 79); Farnhamville, Iowa, U.S.
- Batted: Right Threw: Right

MLB debut
- September 11, 1969, for the Seattle Pilots

Last MLB appearance
- October 1, 1982, for the Oakland Athletics

MLB statistics
- Batting average: .216
- Home runs: 10
- Runs batted in: 120
- Stats at Baseball Reference

Teams
- Seattle Pilots / Milwaukee Brewers (1969–1970); Cleveland Indians (1971–1972); San Diego Padres (1972); New York Yankees (1973–1980); Oakland Athletics (1981–1982)

Career highlights and awards
- 2× World Series champion (1977, 1978)

Frederick Blair Stanley (born August 13, 1947) is an American former professional baseball shortstop, who played in Major League Baseball (MLB) from 1969 to 1982 for the Seattle Pilots / Milwaukee Brewers, Cleveland Indians, San Diego Padres, New York Yankees, and Oakland Athletics. While with the Yankees, he won two World Series championships, back to back in 1977 and 1978, both over the Los Angeles Dodgers. Stanley currently serves as the director of player development for the San Francisco Giants.

== Career ==
Nicknamed "Chicken", Stanley was a key backup to Bucky Dent of the Yankees teams in the late 1970s and was a part of the Yankees championship teams in both 1977 and 1978. Stanley was a favorite player of Phil Rizzuto, who did the color analysis for the Yankees during this timeframe. On September 8, 1973, Stanley hit the last grand slam at the original Yankee Stadium.

Since 1960, no other non-pitcher has had as many seasons (nine) with at least 30 at-bats and five or fewer extra base hits.

On October 12, 2007, Stanley was appointed as the Giants' Director of Player Development. Prior to that, he held several positions in the Giants' organization, including spending 2000–2004 as a minor league manager. In 2001, Stanley managed the Salem-Keizer Volcanoes to the league championship of the Northwest League.

Stanley was the last active player in the major leagues to have played for the short-lived Seattle Pilots franchise.
