= Steve McCatty =

American baseball player and coach (born 1954)

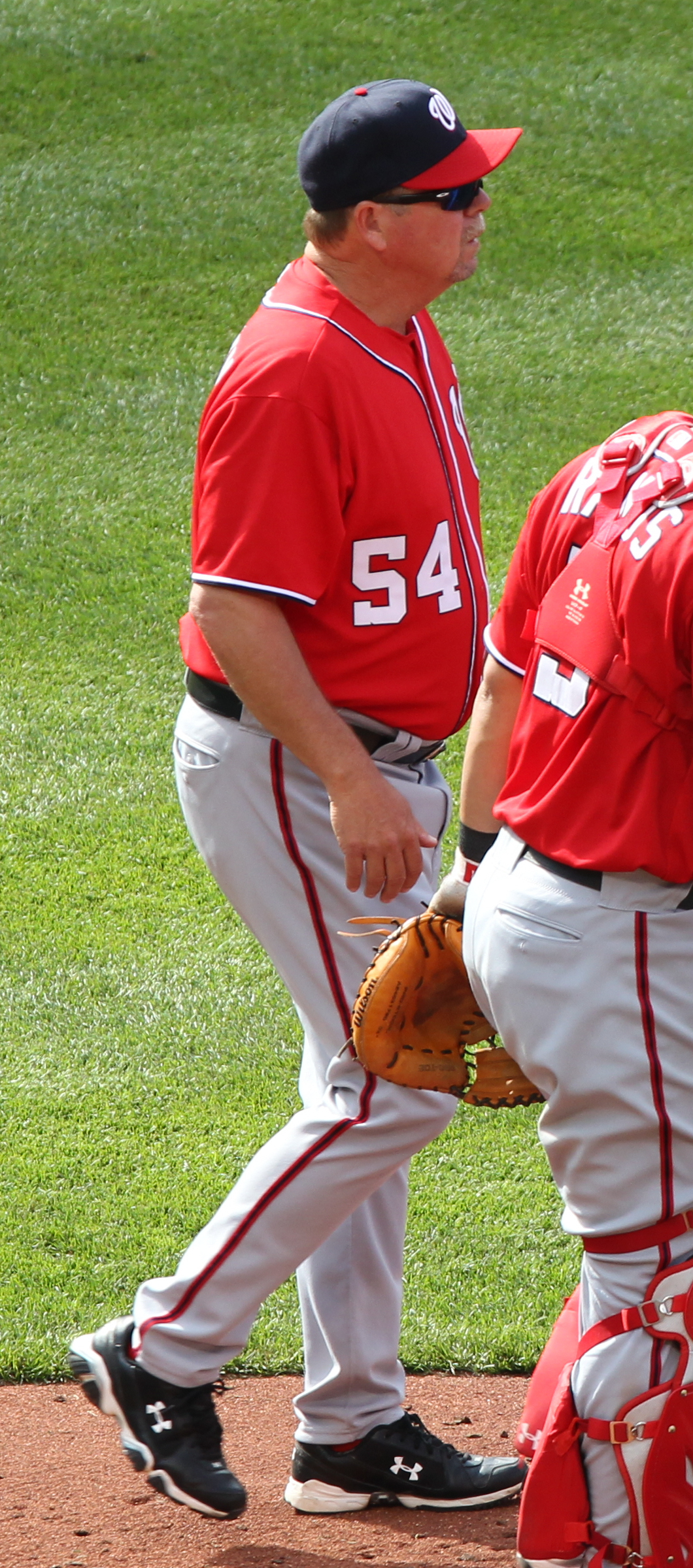
- McCatty as pitching coach for the Washington Nationals
- Pitcher
- Born: March 20, 1954 (age 71); Detroit, Michigan, U.S.
- Batted: Right Threw: Right

MLB debut
- September 17, 1977, for the Oakland Athletics

Last MLB appearance
- September 25, 1985, for the Oakland Athletics

MLB statistics
- Win–loss record: 63–63
- Earned run average: 3.99
- Strikeouts: 541
- Stats at Baseball Reference

Teams
- As player: Oakland Athletics (1977–1985); As coach: Washington Nationals (2009–2015)

Career highlights and awards
- AL wins leader (1981)

Steven Earl McCatty (born March 20, 1954) is an American former professional baseball pitcher who played for the Oakland Athletics of Major League Baseball (MLB) from 1977 to 1985. He graduated from Troy High School in Troy, Michigan, in 1972. He coached the Washington Nationals from 2009 through 2015.

== Baseball career ==
=== Playing career ===
On August 10, 1980, McCatty pitched a 14-inning game against the Seattle Mariners, only to lose 2–1.

During the 1981 strike-shortened season, McCatty finished the season with a league leading 2.33 ERA, second in the American League to Sammy Stewart's 2.32 mark and was tied with three others for most wins with 14, including a league leading four shutouts, the last two of which were consecutive starts for McCatty. He also finished second for the Cy Young Award, behind Rollie Fingers.

However, McCatty would never even approach his 1981 form again. A number of baseball historians and statisticians blame this on manager Billy Martin overworking McCatty and the other members of the 1981 staff. In 2006, Rob Neyer estimated that McCatty threw 131 pitches per complete game in 1981, a heavy workload for a young pitcher even then. However, McCatty never blamed Martin for his post-1981 decline.

During a 1982 exhibition game against the San Diego Padres, McCatty stepped to the plate wielding a toy 15-inch bat but umpire Jim Quick would not allow him to hit. McCatty did this on orders from Martin, who was furious that the designated hitter rule was not allowed in National League ballparks, to use the toy bat as a protest.

=== Coaching career ===
After retiring as a player in 1986, McCatty remained in professional baseball working in radio and TV for the Oakland A's and with ESPN Major League Baseball. McCatty later moved on to coach several minor league baseball clubs, and was hired as pitching coach by the Detroit Tigers for the 2002 season. He subsequently coached for the Ottawa Lynx when it was the AAA affiliate of the Baltimore Orioles. During the offseason, McCatty works with youngsters of all ages to teach pitching mechanics at Jason Thompson Baseball in Auburn Hills, Michigan.

In 2009, McCatty became the second pitching coach in Washington Nationals franchise history, replacing Randy St. Claire, who was fired, and McCatty was called upon to replace him after working at the Nationals' AAA affiliate. The Nationals fired McCatty and the entire coaching staff after the 2015 season.

Preceded by Randy St. Claire	Washington Nationals pitching coach 2009-2015	Succeeded by Mike Maddux
