= Dave McKay (baseball) =

Canadian baseball player and coach (born 1950)

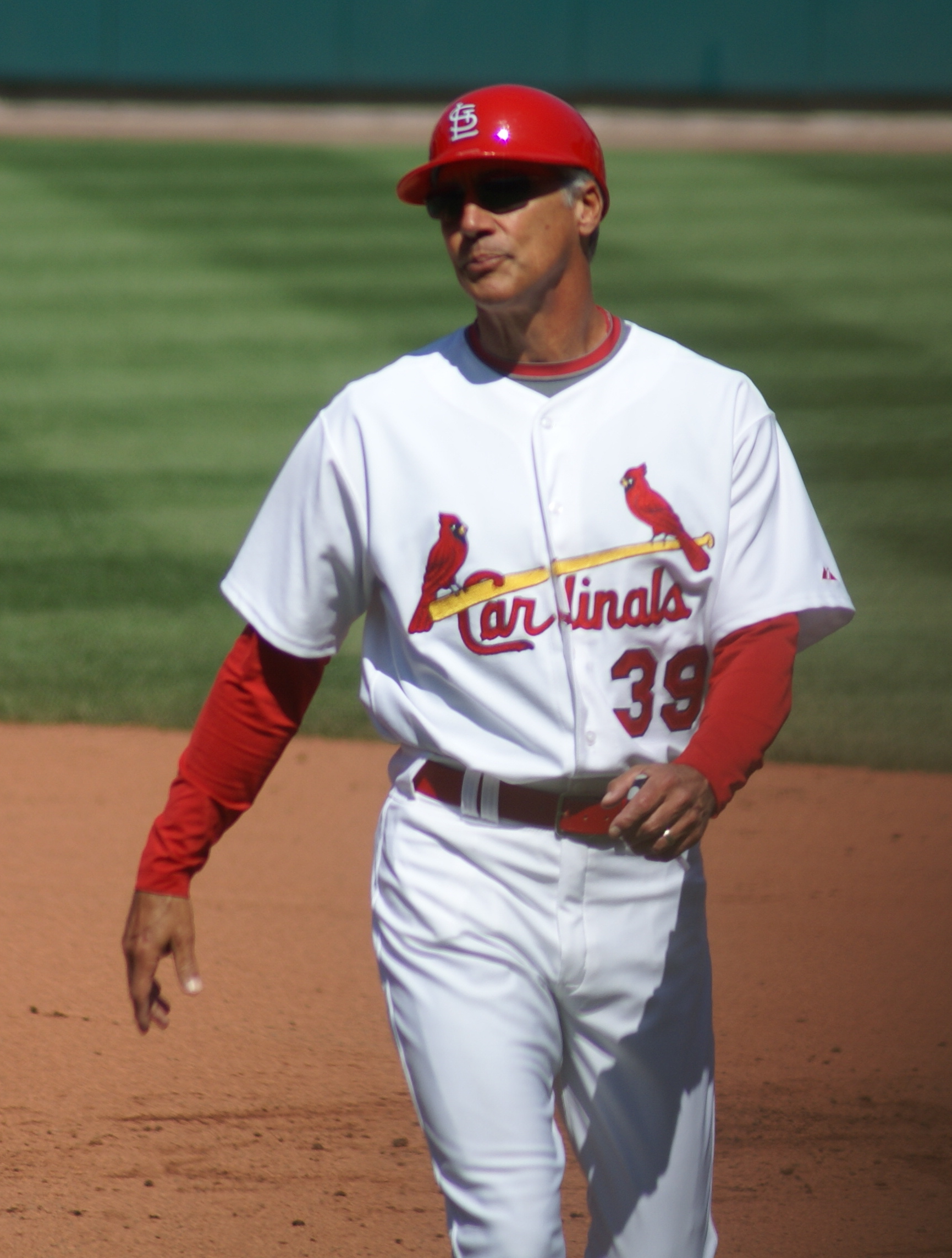
- McKay with the St. Louis Cardinals in 2008

Arizona Diamondbacks – No. 36
- Second baseman / Third baseman / First base coach
- Born: March 14, 1950 (age 75); Vancouver, British Columbia, Canada
- Batted: Both Threw: Right

MLB debut
- August 22, 1975, for the Minnesota Twins

Last MLB appearance
- October 3, 1982, for the Oakland Athletics

MLB statistics
- Batting average: .229
- Home runs: 21
- Runs batted in: 170
- Stats at Baseball Reference

Teams
- As player: Minnesota Twins (1975–1976); Toronto Blue Jays (1977–1979); Oakland Athletics (1980–1982); As coach: Oakland Athletics (1984–1995); St. Louis Cardinals (1996–2011); Chicago Cubs (2012–2013); Arizona Diamondbacks (2014–present)

Career highlights and awards
- 3× World Series champion (1989, 2006, 2011)

Member of the Canadian

Baseball Hall of Fame
- Induction: 2001

David Lawrence McKay (born March 14, 1950) is a Canadian professional baseball coach and former second baseman and third baseman who is the first base coach for the Arizona Diamondbacks of Major League Baseball (MLB). He played in MLB for the Minnesota Twins, Toronto Blue Jays, and Oakland Athletics, and has previously coached for the Athletics, St. Louis Cardinals, and Chicago Cubs. He is the father of former catcher Cody McKay.

He is a member of the Canadian Baseball Hall of Fame, elected in the Class of 2001. He was inducted into the Columbia Basin College Hall of Fame in January 2012.

== Playing career ==
=== Minnesota Twins (1975–76) ===
McKay signed as an amateur free agent with the Minnesota Twins on June 20, 1971, and worked his way through the Twins minor league organization, making his Major League debut on August 22, 1975, hitting a home run in his first at-bat against Vern Ruhle of the Detroit Tigers in an 8–4 victory. McKay appeared in 35 games with the Twins, hitting .256 with two home runs and 16 runs batted in.

He spent the majority of the 1976 season in the minor leagues, though did appear in 45 games with Minnesota, batting .203 with no homers and eight RBI. On November 5, the Twins left McKay unprotected at the 1976 MLB expansion draft where he was selected by the Toronto Blue Jays.

=== Toronto Blue Jays (1977–79) ===
McKay was the Blue Jays' starting third baseman for their first game on April 7, as the Canadian-born player had two hits in Toronto's 9–5 victory over the Chicago White Sox at Exhibition Stadium in Toronto. In 95 games with the Blue Jays, McKay hit .197 with three home runs and 22 RBI, splitting time between second base, third base and shortstop.

McKay became the Blue Jays' starting second baseman in 1978, playing in a career high 145 games, batting .238 with seven homers and 45 RBI. He finished sixth in the American League with six triples, and fifth with a .984 fielding percentage at second base.

McKay struggled in 1979, losing his starting job and spending time with the Blue Jays' Triple-A affiliate, the Syracuse Chiefs, for a majority of the season. With Toronto, McKay hit .218 with 0 HR and 12 RBI in 47 games. On November 5, the Blue Jays released McKay.

=== Oakland Athletics (1980–82) ===
McKay signed with the Oakland Athletics on April 4, 1980, and in 129 games with the Athletics, McKay hit .244 with one homer and 29 RBI as a utility infielder.

He improved offensively in 1981, hitting .263 with four home runs and 21 RBI in 79 games, helping Oakland reach the playoffs. In the 1981 American League Divisional Series, McKay hit .273 with a home run and an RBI as the Athletics defeated the Kansas City Royals to advance to the American League Championship Series. In the ALCS, McKay again hit .273, with an RBI, as Oakland lost to the New York Yankees.

McKay struggled during the 1982 season, hitting only .198 with four home runs and 17 RBI in 78 games.

He spent the 1983 season with Oakland's A and AAA teams before retiring as a player; he joined the Oakland coaching staff under manager Jackie Moore the following season.

McKay appeared in 645 games during his career, recording 441 hits and had a .229 batting average with 21 home runs and 170 RBI. In six career playoff games, McKay hit .273 with one home run and two RBI.

== Coaching career ==
The 2024 season marked McKay's 40th consecutive campaign as a Major League coach, and his eleventh with the Diamondbacks. The previous three decades were spent with three teams: the Athletics (1984–1995), St. Louis Cardinals (1996–2011) and Chicago Cubs (2012–2013). Although almost every year of his coaching career (including his current post) has been spent as a first-base coach, however he spent 1988 as the strength and conditioning coach of the A's. He and José Canseco co-authored a book on proper weight training techniques for baseball players.

McKay began a long-term professional association with both manager Tony La Russa and pitching coach Dave Duncan from the midpoint of the 1986, when LaRussa and Duncan took over their respective positions with Oakland, through 2011 with the Cardinals. The three were on staff for six pennant-winning and three world championship teams—the 1989 Athletics and the 2006 and 2011 Cardinals.

A close friend of LaRussa's, McKay had intended to retire from baseball when LaRussa did. When LaRussa announced his retirement in 2011, McKay realized he was not ready. He was offered the opportunity to remain with the Cardinals in another capacity, and did not blame the organization for not welcoming him back to his former job as first base coach, as the Cardinals' front office was under the impression he planned on retiring with LaRussa.

He joined the Cubs for the 2012 season. After two years with the Cubs, working under Dale Sveum, McKay was named to the Diamondbacks' 2014 coaching staff by manager Kirk Gibson, replacing Steve Sax. McKay is responsible for coaching the team's outfielders as well as for his work at first base.

During a spring training game on March 8, 2021, against the San Francisco Giants, McKay fell against a metal railing in the dugout, breaking a rib and lacerating his spleen.

== See also ==
- List of St. Louis Cardinals coaches

Sporting positions
Preceded by Ed Nottle	Oakland Athletics bullpen coach 1984–1985	Succeeded by Jeff Newman
Preceded by Bob Didier	Oakland Athletics first base coach 1986	Succeeded by Rene Lachemann
Preceded by Jeff Newman	Oakland Athletics bullpen coach 1986–1987	Succeeded by Mike Paul
Preceded by Position created	Oakland Athletics strength & conditioning coach 1988	Succeeded by Position eliminated
Preceded by Rene Lachemann	Oakland Athletics first base coach 1989–1995	Succeeded by Ron Washington
Preceded by José Cardenal	St. Louis Cardinals first base coach 1996–2011	Succeeded by Chris Maloney
Preceded by Bob Dernier	Chicago Cubs first base coach 2012–2013	Succeeded by Eric Hinske
Preceded by Steve Sax	Arizona Diamondbacks first base coach 2014–present	Succeeded by Incumbent
