= 1981 Major League Baseball strike =

1981 worker's strike

- Date: June 12, 1981 – August 9, 1981 (1 month and 4 weeks)
- Location: United States; Canada
- Caused by: Dispute over an unresolved issue related to free agent compensation
- Result: Agreement reached to end strike on July 31, 1981: 712 games canceled during the 1981 season; All-Star Game postponed from July 14 to August 9; Postseason expanded to eight teams under a split-season format

Parties
Major League Baseball Players' Association (MLBPA)	Major League Baseball (MLB)

Lead figures
Marvin Miller (executive director)	Bowie Kuhn (commissioner)

The 1981 Major League Baseball strike was the first work stoppage in Major League Baseball since the 1972 Major League Baseball strike that caused regular season games to be cancelled. It was the fourth work stoppage since 1972, but actions in 1973, 1976, and 1980 cancelled no regular-season games. The strike began on June 12 and forced the cancellation of 712 games—nearly 34 percent of the Major League schedule—in the middle of the season. The two sides reached an agreement on July 31. Play resumed on August 9 with the All-Star Game; regular-season games resumed the following day.

An estimated US$146 million was lost in player salaries, ticket sales, broadcast revenues, and concession revenues. The players lost $4 million a week in salaries while the 30 owners lost a total of $72 million.

== The strike deadline ==
The executive board of the Major League Baseball Players Association (MLBPA) voted unanimously to strike on May 29 due to the unresolved issue of free agent compensation. The deadline was extended briefly, however, after the MLBPA's unfair labor complaint was heard by the National Labor Relations Board (NLRB).

=== Reasons for the strike ===
The strike was called in response to the owners wanting to win back some aspects of control over the players. The owners had already lost at the bargaining table and in the courts on the issue of the free agency draft. At issue during the seven-week-long negotiations was the owners demanding compensation for losing a free agent player to another team. The compensation in question was a player who was selected from the signing team's roster (not including 12 "protected" players). The players maintained that any form of compensation would undermine the value of free agency.

=== Reaction ===
Although the strike was called by the players, many sportswriters and even fans placed most of the blame on the owners. Sports Illustrated reflected this particular opinion with the cover headline "Strike! The Walkout the Owners Provoked." One of the reasons the owners doled out such hefty contracts from 1978 to 1981 (43 players each negotiated contracts worth over $1 million during this period) was that they were afraid of losing disgruntled stars in the free agency reentry draft. The owners paid their players the so-called new going rate in order to keep them from going elsewhere.

Jim Palmer observed the impact of arbitrators on the strike. "They [the owners] wanted an end to binding arbitration where the player picks a salary number (a high one) and the owners pick a number (yes, a low one) and the arbitrator has to choose one number or the other and nothing in between. So, since the owners kept paying more and more to mediocre players, the averages kept going up and the arbitrators looked at the averages and usually went with the player's number, which raised the average some more." He cited as an example of this trend Ed Farmer, an "okay player" who got his salary raised from $70,000 in 1980 to $495,000 in 1981 after an arbitrator sided with him. "The averages keep climbing."

Palmer also noted the owners' desire to save money. "They said they just didn't have any more money...fast-forward thirteen years and the highest paid players in the game, guys like Cal Ripken Jr. and Kirby Puckett, are now making $6 million a year. Ten times what I made. Where do you suppose the owners who didn't have any more money got that extra $5 million? Lotto?" He faulted both sides for the strike. "The players said it was about freedom. The owners said it was about fairness. The bottom line was it was about the bottom line."

Reporters used Strat-O-Matic to simulate the delayed 1981 All-Star game inside Cleveland Stadium, with the scoreboard displaying the game's progress; the Strat-O-Matic set went to the Baseball Hall of Fame. Some newspapers used Strat-O-Matic to simulate other canceled games during the strike.

== The strike ends ==
On July 31, 1981, a compromise was reached. In the settlement, teams that lost a "premium" free agent could be compensated by drawing from a pool of players left unprotected from all of the clubs rather than just the signing club. Players agreed to restricting free agency to players with six or more years of major league service. The settlement gave the owners a limited victory on the compensation issue.

Reportedly, the negotiations were so bitter that when a settlement was finally reached, MLBPA representative Marvin Miller and the owners' negotiator, Ray Grebey, refused to pose with each other for the traditional "peace ceremony" photograph.

=== The All-Star Game ===
Major League Baseball resumed on August 9 with the All-Star Game at Cleveland Municipal Stadium. The game, which was originally scheduled to be held on July 14, now served as a prelude to play resuming on August 10. The National League beat the American League, 5–4. When regular-season play resumed, attendance dropped in 17 of 24 cities and television ratings slumped sharply. Despite the disgruntled fans, the All-Star Game, which was played on a Sunday instead of the usual Tuesday, had its largest attendance (72,086), due to the large seating capacity of Municipal Stadium.

== The split-season format ==
Due to the two-month strike, the owners tried to create an equitable solution. So on August 6, the owners decided to split the 1981 season into two halves, with the first-place teams from each half in each division (or a wild card team if the same club won both halves) meeting in a best-of-five divisional playoff series (this playoff round, known as the Division Series was only used this season; it was not until 13 years later in 1994 that the round became permanent in MLB [it was first played in 1995, as the 1994 season ended prematurely because of another strike], when the league introduced the three-division format). The four survivors then played in the best-of-five League Championship Series. It was the first time that Major League Baseball used a split-season format since 1892.

=== Flaws ===
The split-season idea as put into practice (although garnering the league more playoff revenue) seemed to cheapen the results of the regular season. As first proposed, if a team won its division in both halves of the season, then it would play the team with the second best record overall (first and second half). An Orioles fan, J. Thomas Codd, pointed out, the arrangement would give a team with a good overall record an incentive to lose games against the first-half winner to help a division rival win both halves. On August 20, Major League Baseball revised the rules so that if a team won both halves of the season, it would face the second season runner-up instead.

Facing a playoff no matter their finish in the second half, the first-half winners lacked incentive (as opposed to the minor leagues, where if the same team did win both halves it was given a bye into the next round) to repeat, and finished the second half of the season with a composite record of only three games above .500. Tommy John of the AL East–winning Yankees stated, "With the first-half divisional 'title' wrapped up, we lost our intensity." To make matters worse, the Cincinnati Reds (National League West) and St. Louis Cardinals (National League East) each failed to make the playoffs, even though they had the two best full-season records in the National League that season—and thus would have won their divisions under normal circumstances. The Cardinals received some vindication the following year when they won the World Series; the Reds did not make the postseason again until 1990, when they won the franchise's most recent World Series title.

In contrast to the Reds' and Cardinals' bad luck, the defending American League champion Kansas City Royals made the postseason despite owning the fourth-best full-season record in their division and posting a losing record overall (50–53). Notably, the format allowed the second-half National League East champion Montreal Expos to make the playoffs, the only time the Expos franchise made the postseason in its 36-year stay in Montreal and its only postseason appearance of any kind until 2012, long after the team became the Washington Nationals. Ironically, the next time there was a significant players' strike, 13 years later in 1994, the Expos were the team most hurt by the season's abrupt end.

The Cardinals, Royals, Pittsburgh Pirates and Cleveland Indians ended up playing the fewest games of any team at 103. Meanwhile, the San Francisco Giants played the most at 111, with six others playing 110. Most teams finished with 106 to 109 games played.

Palmer summed it up thusly: "The strike of 1981 lasted fifty-one days. It hurt the owners, it hurt the players, but mostly it hurt the game. Eventually, the game recovered. But it's like a player. Every time he's injured, it's harder to come back."

== See also ==
- 1981 Major League Baseball season
