= 1981 Toronto Blue Jays season =

1981 Toronto Blue Jays
- League: American League
- Division: East
- Ballpark: Exhibition Stadium
- City: Toronto
- Record: 1st half: 16–42 (.276); 2nd half: 21–27 (.438); Overall: 37–69 (.349)
- Divisional place: 1st half: 7th (19 GB); 2nd half: 7th (7 1/2 GB)
- Owners: Labatt Breweries, Imperial Trust, Canadian Imperial Bank of Commerce
- General managers: Pat Gillick
- Managers: Bobby Mattick
- Television: CTV Television Network (Don Chevrier, Tony Kubek, Fergie Olver)
- Radio: CKFH (Jerry Howarth, Early Wynn, Tom Cheek)

The 1981 Toronto Blue Jays season was the franchise's fifth season competing in Major League Baseball. Games were suspended for 50 days due to the 1981 Major League Baseball strike, causing a split season. The Blue Jays finished both halves of the season in seventh place in the seven-team American League East. Managed by Bobby Mattick, the Blue Jays played their home games at Exhibition Stadium and had an overall record of 37 wins and 69 losses.

== Offseason ==
=== Transactions ===
Transactions by the Toronto Blue Jays during the off-season before the 1981 season.

==== October 1980 ====
October 23	Roy Howell granted free agency.

==== November 1980 ====
November 5	Steve Braun granted free agency.

==== December 1980 ====
December 8	Drafted George Bell from the Philadelphia Phillies in the 1980 MLB Rule 5 draft. Drafted Dan Whitmer from the California Angels in the 1980 MLB Rule 5 draft.
December 12	Acquired Roy Lee Jackson from the New York Mets for Bob Bailor.
December 17	Released Bob Davis.

==== January 1981 ====
January 15	Purchased Ken Macha from the Montreal Expos.
January 20	Signed free agent Dale Murray from the Montreal Expos to a contract.

==== February 1981 ====
February 3	Signed free agent Bruce Boisclair from the New York Mets to a contract. Signed free agent Leroy Stanton from the Hanshin Tigers (NPB) to a contract. Signed amateur free agent Oswaldo Peraza.
February 6	Acquired Gil Kubski from the California Angels for Don Pisker.
February 17	Signed free agent Dave Tomlin from the Cincinnati Reds to a contract.

==== March 1981 ====
March 2	Signed free agent John Montague from the California Angels to a contract.

==== April 1981 ====
April 6	Acquired Mark Bomback from the New York Mets for a player to be named later (Charlie Puleo on April 14, 1981). Released John Montague. Released Leroy Stanton.

== Regular season ==
The Blue Jays were one of the worst teams in the majors in the first half of the split season, as the Blue Jays had a record of 16 wins and 42 losses, a percentage of .276. Although the Blue Jays had future stars Jesse Barfield, George Bell, and Lloyd Moseby in the lineup, the team continued to struggle.

On May 15, 1981, Len Barker of the Cleveland Indians pitched a perfect game against the Blue Jays. It was the tenth perfect game ever pitched, is one of only seventeen in the history of the major leagues, and remains the last no-hitter thrown by an Indian.

The result of the season was one of the more controversial times in franchise history. The President of the Blue Jays, Peter Bavasi, went to see the team in Anaheim against the California Angels. Bavasi's father, Buzzie Bavasi was the president of the Angels, and his team had gotten off to a lackluster start. Buzzie wanted to fire Angels manager Jim Fregosi, and Peter Bavasi had the idea to fire his manager, Bobby Mattick. Both thought it would be big news if father and son fired their manager on the same night. One of the Blue Jays executives advised the Jays Vice-Chairman of the Board, Peter Hardy. After a brief conversation, Hardy made it clear to Peter Bavasi that Mattick would not be fired in this way.

After the strike was resolved, the Blue Jays started the second half of the season with a close to .500 winning percentage. Peter Bavasi was heard to muse aloud the requirement to print World Series tickets. The Jays would finish the second half with 21 wins and 27 losses, seven and a half games out of first place. Despite the attempted Bavasi firing, Mattick would resign as manager at the end of the season. On November 22, 1981, Hardy forced Bavasi to resign from the Blue Jays.

=== Season standings ===
AL East
Team	W	L	Pct.	GB	Home	Road
Milwaukee Brewers	62	47	.569	—	28‍–‍21	34‍–‍26
Baltimore Orioles	59	46	.562	1	33‍–‍22	26‍–‍24
New York Yankees	59	48	.551	2	32‍–‍19	27‍–‍29
Detroit Tigers	60	49	.550	2	32‍–‍23	28‍–‍26
Boston Red Sox	59	49	.546	2½	30‍–‍23	29‍–‍26
Cleveland Indians	52	51	.505	7	25‍–‍29	27‍–‍22
Toronto Blue Jays	37	69	.349	23½	17‍–‍36	20‍–‍33

AL East First Half Standings	W	L	Pct.	GB
New York Yankees	34	22	.607	—
Baltimore Orioles	31	23	.574	2
Milwaukee Brewers	31	25	.554	3
Detroit Tigers	31	26	.544	3 1/2
Boston Red Sox	30	26	.536	4
Cleveland Indians	26	24	.520	5
Toronto Blue Jays	16	42	.276	19

AL East Second Half Standings	W	L	Pct.	GB
Milwaukee Brewers	31	22	.585	—
Boston Red Sox	29	23	.558	1 1/2
Detroit Tigers	29	23	.558	1 1/2
Baltimore Orioles	28	23	.549	2
Cleveland Indians	26	27	.491	5
New York Yankees	25	26	.490	5
Toronto Blue Jays	21	27	.438	7 1/2

=== Record vs. opponents ===
1981 American League record Sources:
Team	BAL	BOS	CAL	CWS	CLE	DET	KC	MIL	MIN	NYY	OAK	SEA	TEX	TOR
Baltimore	—	2–2	6–6	3–6	4–2	6–7	5–3	2–4	6–0	7–6	7–5	4–2	2–1	5–2
Boston	2–2	—	2–4	5–4	7–6	6–1	3–3	6–7	2–5	3–3	7–5	9–3	3–6	4–0
California	6–6	4–2	—	6–7	7–5	3–3	0–6	4–3	3–3	2–2	2–8	6–4	2–4	6–6
Chicago	6–3	4–5	7–6	—	2–5	3–3	2–0	4–1	2–4	5–7	7–6	3–3	2–4	7–5
Cleveland	2–4	6–7	5–7	5–2	—	1–5	4–4	3–6	2–1	7–5	3–2	8–4	2–2	4–2
Detroit	7–6	1–6	3–3	3–3	5–1	—	3–2	5–8	9–3	3–7	1–2	5–1	9–3	6–4
Kansas City	3–5	3–3	6–0	0–2	4–4	2–3	—	4–5	9–4	2–10	3–3	6–7	3–4	5–3
Milwaukee	4–2	7–6	3–4	1–4	6–3	8–5	5–4	—	9–3	3–3	4–2	2–2	4–5	6–4
Minnesota	0–6	5–2	3–3	4–2	1–2	3–9	4–9	3–9	—	3–3	2–8	3–6–1	5–8	5–1
New York	6–7	3–3	2–2	7–5	5–7	7–3	10–2	3–3	3–3	—	4–3	2–3	5–4	2–3
Oakland	5–7	5–7	8–2	6–7	2–3	2–1	3–3	2–4	8–2	3–4	—	6–1	4–2	10–2
Seattle	2–4	3–9	4–6	3–3	4–8	1–5	7–6	2–2	6–3–1	3–2	1–6	—	5–8	3–3
Texas	1–2	6–3	4–2	4–2	2–2	3–9	4–3	5–4	8–5	4–5	2–4	8–5	—	6–2
Toronto	2–5	0–4	6–6	5–7	2–4	4–6	3–5	4–6	1–5	3–2	2–10	3–3	2–6	—

=== Opening Day starters ===
- Danny Ainge
- Barry Bonnell
- Jim Clancy
- Dámaso García
- Alfredo Griffin
- John Mayberry
- Lloyd Moseby
- Otto Vélez
- Ernie Whitt
- Al Woods

=== Transactions ===
Transactions for the Toronto Blue Jays during the 1981 regular season.

==== May 1981 ====
May 10	Acquired Buck Martinez from the Milwaukee Brewers for Gil Kubski.

==== June 1981 ====
June 10	Player rights of Rick Bosetti sold to the Oakland Athletics.
June 15	Signed amateur free agent Luis Aquino.

==== August 1981 ====
August 8	Purchased Juan Berenguer from the Kansas City Royals.

==== September 1981 ====
September 3	Signed free agent Ted Cox from the Seattle Mariners to a contract.
September 10	Signed free agent Nino Espinosa from the Philadelphia Phillies to a contract.

=== Roster ===
1981 Toronto Blue Jays roster
Roster
Pitchers: 46 Mike Barlow; 30 Juan Berenguer; 45 Mark Bomback; 18 Jim Clancy; 38 Nino Espinosa; 36 Jerry Garvin; 25 Roy Lee Jackson; 48 Luis Leal; 50 Joey McLaughlin; 42 Paul Mirabella; 33 Dale Murray; 37 Dave Stieb; 40 Jackson Todd; 23 Mike Willis	Catchers: 13 Buck Martinez; 6 Dan Whitmer; 12 Ernie Whitt; Infielders: 2 Danny Ainge; 34 Ted Cox; 7 Dámaso García; 4 Alfredo Griffin; 16 Garth Iorg; 8 Ken Macha; 2 Fred Manrique; 10 John Mayberry; 43 Greg Wells	Outfielders: 29 Jesse Barfield; 11 George Bell; 9 Barry Bonnell; 22 Rick Bosetti; 20 Al Woods; Other batters: 32 Charlie Beamon; 26 Willie Upshaw; 19 Otto Vélez	Manager: 3 Bobby Mattick; Coaches: 31 Bobby Doerr (Hitting); 28 John Felske (Bullpen); 14 Denis Menke (First Base); 41 Al Widmar (Pitching); 24 Jimy Williams (Third Base)

=== Game log ===
1981 Game Log 37–69 (Home 17–36, Away 20–33)
April: 7–12 (Home 2–7, Away 5–5)

#	Date	Opponent	Score	Win	Loss	Save	Attendance	Record
1	April 9	@ Tigers	2–6	Morris (1–0)	McLaughlin (0–1)		51,452	0–1
2	April 11	@ Tigers	2–6	Wilcox (1–0)	Stieb (0–1)		13,617	0–2
3	April 12	@ Tigers	6–2	Leal (1–0)	Bailey (0–1)		9,950	1–2
4	April 13	Yankees	5–1	Clancy (1–0)	John (1–1)	Jackson (1)	25,112	2–2
5	April 15	Yankees	3–6	May (2–0)	Todd (0–1)	Gossage (1)	16,280	2–3
6	April 16	Tigers	0–2	Wilcox (2–0)	Stieb (0–2)	López (1)	11,058	2–4
7	April 17	Tigers	5–8	Bailey (1–1)	Leal (1–1)	Saucier (1)	15,196	2–5
8	April 18	Tigers	3–4	Schatzeder (1–0)	Clancy (1–1)	López (2)	16,294	2–6
9	April 19	Tigers	9–1	Bomback (1–0)	Morris (1–1)		12,274	3–6
10	April 20	Brewers	4–5 (12)	Lerch (1–0)	Willis (0–1)		12,298	3–7
11	April 21	Brewers	2–6	Haas (1–0)	Stieb (0–3)		11,083	3–8
12	April 22	Brewers	1–8	Caldwell (2–1)	Leal (1–2)		11,792	3–9
–	April 23	@ Yankees	Postponed (rain) Not rescheduled					
13	April 24	@ Yankees	2–4	John (2–1)	Bomback (1–1)	Gossage (4)	20,863	3–10
14	April 25	@ Yankees	7–2	Todd (1–1)	May (3–1)		17,319	4–10
15	April 26	@ Yankees	2–1	Stieb (1–3)	Underwood (0–2)		37,306	5–10
16	April 27	@ Brewers	3–4 (12)	Cleveland (1–0)	Garvin (0–1)		6,692	5–11
17	April 28	@ Brewers	6–2	Bomback (2–1)	Caldwell (2–2)		6,433	6–11
18	April 29	@ Brewers	5–0 (14)	Leal (2–2)	Easterly (0–1)		7,320	7–11
19	April 30	@ Orioles	0–4	Flanagan (2–2)	Todd (1–2)		7,726	7–12

May: 9–20 (Home 5–10, Away 4–10)

#	Date	Opponent	Score	Win	Loss	Save	Attendance	Record
–	May 1	@ Orioles	Postponed (rain) Rescheduled for May 2					
20	May 2	@ Orioles	3–4	Palmer (1–0)	Willis (0–2)			7–13
21	May 2	@ Orioles	3–8	McGregor (2–1)	Leal (2–3)		16,402	7–14
22	May 3	@ Orioles	4–2	Bomback (3–1)	Stone (1–3)	McLaughlin (1)	23,898	8–14
–	May 5	Indians	Postponed (rain) Rescheduled for July 19					
23	May 6	Indians	1–4	Blyleven (3–1)	Todd (1–3)		11,469	8–15
24	May 7	Indians	6–2	Stieb (2–3)	Waits (3–1)		11,328	9–15
25	May 8	Red Sox	2–4	Torrez (2–2)	Bomback (3–2)	Burgmeier (3)	15,106	9–16
26	May 9	Red Sox	3–10	Stanley (3–1)	Clancy (1–2)		16,040	9–17
27	May 10	Red Sox	5–9 (10)	Burgmeier (2–0)	Jackson (0–1)		17,411	9–18
28	May 11	Red Sox	6–7	Clear (2–0)	Willis (0–3)		11,315	9–19
29	May 12	Orioles	5–2	Stieb (3–3)	Palmer (1–1)		11,354	10–19
30	May 13	Orioles	0–4	McGregor (3–1)	Bomback (3–3)		12,568	10–20
31	May 14	Orioles	0–10	Flanagan (4–3)	Clancy (1–3)		11,509	10–21
32	May 15	@ Indians	0–3	Barker (3–1)	Leal (2–4)		7,290	10–22
33	May 16	@ Indians	4–1	Todd (2–3)	Garland (2–3)		24,964	11–22
34	May 17	@ Indians	0–1	Waits (4–2)	Stieb (3–4)	Monge (1)		11–23
35	May 17	@ Indians	1–2 (10)	Blyleven (5–1)	Jackson (0–2)		46,168	11–24
36	May 18	White Sox	2–7	Trout (3–1)	Bomback (3–4)		18,652	11–25
37	May 19	White Sox	9–5	Clancy (2–3)	Hoyt (3–1)	Leal (1)	11,604	12–25
38	May 20	White Sox	5–6	Farmer (1–2)	McLaughlin (0–2)	Hoyt (5)	12,536	12–26
39	May 22	@ Athletics	2–6	Langford (5–4)	Stieb (3–5)		13,426	12–27
40	May 23	@ Athletics	2–3 (15)	Jones (3–1)	Leal (2–5)		27,147	12–28
41	May 24	@ Athletics	5–6 (12)	Owchinko (2–1)	McLaughlin (0–3)			12–29
42	May 24	@ Athletics	0–5	Norris (7–2)	Garvin (0–2)		32,985	12–30
43	May 25	@ Angels	1–2	Witt (3–4)	Todd (2–4)	Hassler (3)	22,171	12–31
44	May 26	@ Angels	8–4	Jackson (1–2)	Rau (1–2)	McLaughlin (2)	21,222	13–31
45	May 27	@ Angels	3–1	Stieb (4–5)	Forsch (6–3)		21,167	14–31
46	May 29	Athletics	6–3	Clancy (3–3)	Keough (6–2)	Jackson (2)	16,509	15–31
47	May 30	Athletics	6–5	Leal (3–5)	Norris (7–3)	McLaughlin (3)	21,046	16–31
48	May 31	Athletics	5–6	Owchinko (3–1)	McLaughlin (0–4)		24,079	16–32

June: 0–10 (Home 0–5, Away 0–5)

#	Date	Opponent	Score	Win	Loss	Save	Attendance	Record
49	June 1	Angels	0–3	Forsch (7–3)	Stieb (4–6)		12,268	16–33
50	June 2	Angels	0–3	Frost (1–0)	Leal (3–6)	Hassler (4)	12,617	16–34
51	June 3	Angels	6–17	Zahn (6–6)	Clancy (3–4)		12,401	16–35
52	June 5	@ Rangers	4–5 (12)	Comer (4–1)	Leal (3–7)		11,495	16–36
53	June 6	@ Rangers	1–4	Jenkins (4–4)	Stieb (4–7)		24,312	16–37
54	June 7	@ Rangers	0–9	Darwin (7–4)	Todd (2–5)		14,857	16–38
55	June 8	@ White Sox	2–6	Lamp (2–1)	Clancy (3–5)	Hickey (1)	8,301	16–39
56	June 9	@ White Sox	0–3	Dotson (7–3)	Leal (3–8)		8,534	16–40
57	June 10	Royals	4–7	Leonard (6–7)	Bomback (3–5)		19,098	16–41
58	June 11	Royals	5–10	Martin (2–3)	Willis (0–4)	Quisenberry (9)	16,498	16–42

August: 9–10 (Home 4–8, Away 5–2)

#	Date	Opponent	Score	Win	Loss	Save	Attendance	Record
59	August 10	@ Tigers	3–4	Saucier (1–0)	McLaughlin (0–5)		15,187	16–43
60	August 11	@ Tigers	6–4	Berenguer (1–4)	Schatzeder (3–5)	Jackson (3)	10,526	17–43
61	August 12	@ Tigers	4–3	Stieb (5–7)	Morris (9–4)	Jackson (4)	8,775	18–43
62	August 14	Brewers	5–4	Garvin (1–2)	Easterly (2–2)	Jackson (5)	15,114	19–43
63	August 15	Brewers	4–3	Bomback (4–5)	Cleveland (2–2)	McLaughlin (4)	12,467	20–43
64	August 16	Brewers	2–6	Caldwell (8–5)	Stieb (5–8)	Fingers (14)		20–44
65	August 16	Brewers	0–2	Lerch (4–6)	Todd (2–6)	Fingers (15)	24,472	20–45
66	August 17	@ Royals	3–5	Gale (5–5)	Clancy (3–6)	Quisenberry (11)	31,958	20–46
67	August 18	@ Royals	5–3	Leal (4–8)	Jones (1–1)	Jackson (6)	26,952	21–46
68	August 19	@ Royals	9–4	Berenguer (2–4)	Leonard (7–8)		28,174	22–46
69	August 21	White Sox	5–4	Stieb (6–8)	Farmer (2–3)		14,161	23–46
70	August 22	White Sox	0–8	Burns (8–2)	Clancy (3–7)		19,080	23–47
71	August 23	White Sox	2–13	Trout (7–4)	Leal (4–9)		16,486	23–48
72	August 24	Rangers	0–3	Medich (7–3)	Berenguer (2–5)		12,735	23–49
73	August 25	Rangers	1–6	Jenkins (5–6)	Stieb (6–9)		13,729	23–50
74	August 27	Royals	5–11	Martin (3–5)	Clancy (3–8)		14,704	23–51
75	August 28	Royals	4–3	McLaughlin (1–5)	Brett (1–1)		13,230	24–51
76	August 29	Royals	0–2	Jones (2–1)	Berenguer (2–6)	Quisenberry (13)	19,055	24–52
–	August 30	Royals	Postponed (rain) Not rescheduled					
77	August 31	@ Rangers	3–0	Stieb (7–9)	Jenkins (5–7)		8,034	25–52

September: 11–15 (Home 6–6, Away 5–9)

#	Date	Opponent	Score	Win	Loss	Save	Attendance	Record
78	September 1	@ Rangers	9–3	Clancy (4–8)	Darwin (8–7)		8,358	26–52
79	September 2	@ Rangers	1–4	Honeycutt (9–3)	Leal (4–10)		6,851	26–53
80	September 3	@ White Sox	3–4	Hoyt (6–3)	Berenguer (2–7)		6,669	26–54
81	September 4	@ White Sox	6–2	Stieb (8–9)	Lamp (5–3)		18,317	27–54
82	September 5	@ White Sox	3–1	Clancy (5–8)	Baumgarten (5–8)	McLaughlin (5)	14,628	28–54
83	September 6	@ White Sox	3–2	Leal (5–10)	Burns (8–3)	Jackson (7)	11,250	29–54
84	September 7	@ Twins	0–4	Jackson (3–2)	Berenguer (2–8)	Corbett (9)	5,024	29–55
85	September 8	@ Twins	0–1	Havens (2–4)	Stieb (8–10)		2,839	29–56
86	September 9	@ Twins	1–3	Arroyo (6–7)	Clancy (5–9)	Corbett (10)	3,381	29–57
87	September 10	Mariners	2–0	Leal (6–10)	Clay (0–6)	McLaughlin (6)	11,685	30–57
88	September 11	Mariners	1–8	Abbott (3–6)	Berenguer (2–9)		12,023	30–58
89	September 12	Mariners	3–0	Stieb (9–10)	Beattie (2–2)		14,048	31–58
90	September 14	Twins	3–6	Havens (3–4)	Clancy (5–10)	Corbett (13)	11,402	31–59
91	September 15	Twins	4–2	Leal (7–10)	Arroyo (6–8)	McLaughlin (7)	12,037	32–59
92	September 16	Twins	2–5	Williams (5–8)	Berenguer (2–10)		11,733	32–60
93	September 18	Angels	5–1	Murray (1–0)	Witt (5–9)		13,478	33–60
94	September 19	Angels	6–4	Clancy (6–10)	Frost (1–7)		16,418	34–60
95	September 20	Angels	6–3	Bomback (5–5)	Zahn (9–11)	McLaughlin (8)	20,575	35–60
–	September 21	Athletics	Postponed (rain) Rescheduled for September 22					
96	September 22	Athletics	2–3 (13)	Beard (1–1)	Leal (7–11)			35–61
97	September 22	Athletics	2–4	McCatty (13–6)	Berenguer (2–11)		15,542	35–62
98	September 23	Athletics	0–6	Langford (11–9)	Clancy (6–11)		14,114	35–63
99	September 25	@ Angels	5–11	Zahn (10–11)	Leal (7–12)		19,890	35–64
100	September 26	@ Angels	3–6	Renko (8–4)	Berenguer (2–12)	Hassler (5)	18,886	35–65
101	September 27	@ Angels	4–3	Stieb (10–10)	Moreno (1–2)	McLaughlin (9)	24,903	36–65
102	September 29	@ Athletics	1–5	Underwood (4–6)	Clancy (6–12)		10,998	36–66
103	September 30	@ Athletics	0–3	Norris (12–9)	Leal (7–13)		11,144	36–67

October: 1–2 (Home 0–0, Away 1–2)

#	Date	Opponent	Score	Win	Loss	Save	Attendance	Record
104	October 2	@ Mariners	3–8	Clay (2–7)	Berenguer (2–13)		5,148	36–68
105	October 3	@ Mariners	4–3	Stieb (11–10)	Abbott (4–9)	McLaughlin (10)	8,653	37–68
106	October 4	@ Mariners	0–2	Bannister (9–9)	Todd (2–7)	Rawley (8)	4,885	37–69

*An MLB Players strike forced the cancellation of all regular season games between June 12 and August 9. A split-season format was adopted.

== Player stats ==
= Indicates team leader

=== Batting ===
==== Starters by position ====
Note: Pos = Position; G = Games played; AB = At bats; R = Runs scored; H = Hits; 2B = Doubles; 3B = Triples; Avg. = Batting average; HR = Home runs; RBI = Runs batted in; SB = Stolen bases

Pos	Player	G	AB	R	H	2B	3B	Avg.	HR	RBI	SB
C	Ernie Whitt	74	195	16	46	9	0	.236	1	16	5
1B	John Mayberry	94	290	34	72	6	1	.248	17	43	1
2B	Dámaso García	64	250	24	63	8	1	.252	1	13	13
3B	Danny Ainge	86	246	20	46	6	2	.187	0	14	8
SS	Alfredo Griffin	101	388	30	81	19	6	.209	0	21	8
LF	Alvis Woods	85	288	20	71	15	0	.247	1	21	3
CF	Lloyd Moseby	100	378	36	88	16	2	.233	9	43	11
RF	Barry Bonnell	66	227	21	50	7	4	.220	4	28	4
DH	Otto Vélez	80	240	32	51	9	2	.213	11	28	0

==== Other batters ====
Note: G = Games played; AB = At bats; R = Runs scored; H = Hits; 2B = Doubles; 3B = Triples; Avg. = Batting average; HR = Home runs; RBI = Runs batted in; SB = Stolen bases

Player	G	AB	R	H	2B	3B	Avg.	HR	RBI	SB
Garth Iorg	70	215	17	52	11	0	.242	0	10	2
George Bell	60	163	19	38	2	1	.233	5	12	3
Buck Martinez	45	128	13	29	8	1	.227	4	21	1
Willie Upshaw	61	111	15	19	3	1	.171	4	10	2
Jesse Barfield	25	95	7	22	3	2	.232	2	9	4
Ken Macha	37	85	4	17	2	0	.200	0	6	1
Greg Wells	32	73	7	18	5	0	.247	0	5	0
Ted Cox	16	50	6	15	4	0	.300	0	1	0
Rick Bosetti	25	47	5	11	2	0	.234	0	4	0
Fred Manrique	14	28	1	4	0	0	.143	0	1	0
Charlie Beamon	8	15	1	3	1	0	.200	0	0	0
Dan Whitmer	7	9	0	1	1	0	.111	0	0	0

=== Pitching ===
= Indicates league leader

==== Starting pitchers ====
Note: G = Games pitched; GS = Games started; IP = Innings pitched; W = Wins; L = Losses; ERA = Earned run average; R = Runs allowed; ER = Earned runs allowed; BB = Walks allowed; K = Strikeouts

Player	G	GS	IP	W	L	ERA	R	ER	BB	K
Dave Stieb	25	25	183.2	11	10	3.19	70	65	61	89
Jim Clancy	22	22	125.0	6	12	4.90	77	68	64	56
Juan Berenguer	12	11	71.0	2	9	4.31	41	34	35	29

==== Other pitchers ====
Note: G = Games pitched; GS = Games started; IP = Innings pitched; W = Wins; L = Losses; SV = Saves; ERA = Earned run average; R = Runs allowed; ER = Earned runs allowed; BB = Walks allowed; K = Strikeouts

Player	G	GS	IP	W	L	SV	ERA	R	ER	BB	K
Luis Leal	29	19	129.2	7	13	1	3.68	63	53	44	71
Jackson Todd	21	13	97.2	2	7	0	3.96	51	43	31	41
Mark Bomback	20	11	90.1	5	5	0	3.89	42	39	35	33

==== Relief pitchers ====
Note: G = Games pitched; IP = Innings pitched; W = Wins; L = Losses; SV = Saves; ERA = Earned run average; R = Runs allowed; ER = Earned runs allowed; BB = Walks allowed; K = Strikeouts

Player	G	IP	W	L	SV	ERA	R	ER	BB	K
Joey McLaughlin	40	60.0	1	5	10	2.85	24	19	21	38
Roy Lee Jackson	39	62.0	1	2	7	2.61	23	18	25	27
Jerry Garvin	35	53.0	1	2	0	3.40	20	20	23	25
Mike Willis	20	35.0	0	4	0	5.91	25	23	20	16
Mike Barlow	12	15.0	0	0	0	4.20	11	7	6	5
Dale Murray	11	15.1	1	0	0	1.17	2	2	5	12
Paul Mirabella	8	14.2	0	0	0	7.36	16	12	7	9
Nino Espinosa	1	1.0	0	0	0	9.00	1	1	0	0

== Award winners ==
All-Star Game

- Dave Stieb, Pitcher

== Farm system ==
Level	Team	League	Manager
AAA	Syracuse Chiefs	International League	Bob Humphreys
AA	Knoxville Blue Jays	Southern League	Duane Larson and Larry Hardy
A	Kinston Eagles	Carolina League	John McLaren
A	Florence Blue Jays	South Atlantic League	Dennis Holmberg
Rookie	GCL Blue Jays	Gulf Coast League	Rich Hacker
Rookie	Medicine Hat Blue Jays	Pioneer League	Wayne Graham
