= 1981 California Angels season =

Major League Baseball season

1981 California Angels
- League: American League
- Division: West
- Ballpark: Anaheim Stadium
- City: Anaheim, California
- Record: 51–59 (.464)
- Divisional place: 5th
- Owner: Gene Autry
- General manager: Buzzie Bavasi
- Managers: Jim Fregosi, Gene Mauch
- Television: KTLA
- Radio: KMPC (Don Drysdale, Ron Fairly, Bob Starr)
- Stats: ESPN.com; Baseball Reference

The 1981 California Angels season was the 21st season of the California Angels franchise in the American League, the 16th in Anaheim, and their 16th season playing their home games at Anaheim Stadium. The Angels finished with the fifth best overall record in the American League West with 51 wins and 59 losses. The season was suspended for 50 days due to the infamous 1981 players' strike and the league chose as its playoff teams the division winners from the first and second halves of the season.

== Offseason ==
- December 2, 1980: Geoff Zahn was signed as a free agent by the Angels.
- December 8, 1980: Dan Whitmer was drafted from the Angels by the Toronto Blue Jays in the 1980 rule 5 draft.
- January 13, 1981: Ron Romanick was drafted by the California Angels in the 1st round (4th pick) of the 1981 amateur draft (secondary phase).
- January 23, 1981: Joe Rudi, Frank Tanana and Jim Dorsey were traded by the Angels to the Boston Red Sox for Fred Lynn and Steve Renko.
- February 2, 1981: Dave Rader was signed as a free agent by the Angels.
- February 2, 1981: Dave Skaggs was released by the Angels.

== Regular season ==
=== Season standings ===
AL West
Team	W	L	Pct.	GB	Home	Road
Oakland Athletics	64	45	.587	—	35‍–‍21	29‍–‍24
Texas Rangers	57	48	.543	5	32‍–‍24	25‍–‍24
Chicago White Sox	54	52	.509	8½	25‍–‍24	29‍–‍28
Kansas City Royals	50	53	.485	11	19‍–‍28	31‍–‍25
California Angels	51	59	.464	13½	26‍–‍28	25‍–‍31
Seattle Mariners	44	65	.404	20	20‍–‍37	24‍–‍28
Minnesota Twins	41	68	.376	23	24‍–‍36	17‍–‍32

AL West First Half Standings	W	L	Pct.	GB
Oakland Athletics	37	23	.617	—
Texas Rangers	33	22	.600	1 1/2
Chicago White Sox	31	22	.585	2 1/2
California Angels	31	29	.517	6
Kansas City Royals	20	30	.400	12
Seattle Mariners	21	36	.368	14 1/2
Minnesota Twins	17	39	.304	18

AL West Second Half Standings	W	L	Pct.	GB
Kansas City Royals	30	23	.566	—
Oakland Athletics	27	22	.551	1
Texas Rangers	24	26	.480	4 1/2
Minnesota Twins	24	29	.453	6
Seattle Mariners	23	29	.442	6 1/2
Chicago White Sox	23	30	.434	7
California Angels	20	30	.400	8 1/2

=== Record vs. opponents ===
1981 American League record Sources:
Team	BAL	BOS	CAL	CWS	CLE	DET	KC	MIL	MIN	NYY	OAK	SEA	TEX	TOR
Baltimore	—	2–2	6–6	3–6	4–2	6–7	5–3	2–4	6–0	7–6	7–5	4–2	2–1	5–2
Boston	2–2	—	2–4	5–4	7–6	6–1	3–3	6–7	2–5	3–3	7–5	9–3	3–6	4–0
California	6–6	4–2	—	6–7	7–5	3–3	0–6	4–3	3–3	2–2	2–8	6–4	2–4	6–6
Chicago	6–3	4–5	7–6	—	2–5	3–3	2–0	4–1	2–4	5–7	7–6	3–3	2–4	7–5
Cleveland	2–4	6–7	5–7	5–2	—	1–5	4–4	3–6	2–1	7–5	3–2	8–4	2–2	4–2
Detroit	7–6	1–6	3–3	3–3	5–1	—	3–2	5–8	9–3	3–7	1–2	5–1	9–3	6–4
Kansas City	3–5	3–3	6–0	0–2	4–4	2–3	—	4–5	9–4	2–10	3–3	6–7	3–4	5–3
Milwaukee	4–2	7–6	3–4	1–4	6–3	8–5	5–4	—	9–3	3–3	4–2	2–2	4–5	6–4
Minnesota	0–6	5–2	3–3	4–2	1–2	3–9	4–9	3–9	—	3–3	2–8	3–6–1	5–8	5–1
New York	6–7	3–3	2–2	7–5	5–7	7–3	10–2	3–3	3–3	—	4–3	2–3	5–4	2–3
Oakland	5–7	5–7	8–2	6–7	2–3	2–1	3–3	2–4	8–2	3–4	—	6–1	4–2	10–2
Seattle	2–4	3–9	4–6	3–3	4–8	1–5	7–6	2–2	6–3–1	3–2	1–6	—	5–8	3–3
Texas	1–2	6–3	4–2	4–2	2–2	3–9	4–3	5–4	8–5	4–5	2–4	8–5	—	6–2
Toronto	2–5	0–4	6–6	5–7	2–4	4–6	3–5	4–6	1–5	3–2	2–10	3–3	2–6	—

=== Notable transactions ===
- April 20, 1981: Dave Rader was released by the Angels.
- June 8, 1981: 1981 Major League Baseball draft
  - Dick Schofield was drafted by the Angels in the 1st round (3rd pick).
  - Devon White was drafted by the Angels in the 6th round. Player signed June 13, 1981.

=== Roster ===
1981 California Angels
Roster
Pitchers: 46 Don Aase; 28 John D'Acquisto; 43 Ken Forsch; 37 Dave Frost; 41 Andy Hassler; 34 Jesse Jefferson; 24 Bruce Kison; 22 Mickey Mahler; 27 Alfredo Martínez; 21 Ángel Moreno; 31 Doug Rau; 45 Steve Renko; 40 Luis Sánchez; 26 Bill Travers; 39 Mike Witt; 38 Geoff Zahn	Catchers: 16 Bob Davis; 11 Joe Ferguson; 14 Ed Ott; Infielders: 7 Rick Burleson; 19 Bert Campaneris; 29 Rod Carew; 4 Bobby Grich; 13 John Harris; 10 Butch Hobson; 23 Steve Lubratich; 2 Freddie Patek; 6 Daryl Sconiers	Outfielders: 12 Juan Beníquez; 3,30 Tom Brunansky; 32 Bobby Clark; 9 Brian Downing; 15 Dan Ford; 20 Larry Harlow; 9 Brian Harper; 8 Fred Lynn; Other batters: 25 Don Baylor	Manager: 11 Jim Fregosi; 44 Gene Mauch; Coaches: 49 Bob Clear; 51 Preston Gómez; 1 Bobby Knoop; 47 Tom Morgan; 50 Jimmie Reese; 14 Merv Rettenmund

== Player stats ==
= Indicates team leader

= Indicates league leader

=== Batting ===
==== Starters by position ====
Note: Pos = Position; G = Games played; AB = At bats; H = Hits; Avg. = Batting average; HR = Home runs; RBI = Runs batted in

Pos	Player	G	AB	H	Avg.	HR	RBI
C	Ed Ott	75	258	56	.217	2	22
1B	Rod Carew	93	364	111	.305	2	21
2B	Bobby Grich	100	352	107	.304	22*	61
SS	Rick Burleson	109	430	126	.293	5	33
3B	Butch Hobson	85	268	63	.235	4	36
LF	Brian Downing	93	317	79	.249	9	41
CF	Fred Lynn	76	256	56	.219	5	31
RF	Dan Ford	97	375	104	.277	15	48
DH	Don Baylor	103	377	90	.239	17	66

- Tied with Tony Armas (Oakland), Dwight Evans (Boston) and Eddie Murray (Baltimore)

==== Other batters ====
Note: G = Games played; AB = At bats; H = Hits; Avg. = Batting average; HR = Home runs; RBI = Runs batted in

Player	G	AB	H	Avg.	HR	RBI
Juan Beníquez	58	166	30	.181	3	13
Bobby Clark	34	88	22	.250	4	19
Larry Harlow	43	82	17	.207	0	4
Bert Campaneris	55	82	21	.256	1	10
John Harris	36	77	19	.247	3	9
Daryl Sconiers	15	52	14	.269	1	7
Freddie Patek	27	47	11	.234	0	5
Tom Brunansky	11	33	5	.152	3	6
Joe Ferguson	12	30	7	.233	1	5
Steve Lubratich	7	21	3	.143	0	1
Brian Harper	4	11	3	.273	0	1
Bob Davis	1	2	0	.000	0	0

=== Pitching ===
==== Starting pitchers ====
Note: G = Games pitched; IP = Innings pitched; W = Wins; L = Losses; ERA = Earned run average; SO = Strikeouts

Player	G	IP	W	L	ERA	SO
Geoff Zahn	25	161.1	10	11	4.41	52
Ken Forsch	20	153.0	11	7	2.88	55
Mike Witt	22	129.0	8	9	3.28	75
Steve Renko	22	102.0	8	4	3.44	50
Dave Frost	12	47.1	1	8	5.51	16
Doug Rau	3	10.1	1	2	8.71	3
Bill Travers	4	9.2	0	1	8.38	5

==== Other pitchers ====
Note: G = Games pitched; IP = Innings pitched; W = Wins; L = Losses; ERA = Earned run average; SO = Strikeouts

Player	G	IP	W	L	ERA	SO
Jesse Jefferson	26	77.0	2	4	3.62	27
Bruce Kison	11	44.0	1	1	3.48	19
Ángel Moreno	8	31.1	1	3	2.87	12

==== Relief pitchers ====
Note: G = Games pitched; W = Wins; L = Losses; SV = Saves; ERA = Earned run average; SO = Strikeouts

Player	G	W	L	SV	ERA	SO
Don Aase	39	4	4	11	2.34	38
Andy Hassler	42	4	3	5	3.21	44
Luis Sánchez	17	0	2	2	2.94	13
John D'Acquisto	6	0	0	0	10.71	8
Mickey Mahler	6	0	0	0	0.00	5
Alfredo Martínez	2	0	0	0	3.00	4

== Farm system ==
Level	Team	League	Manager
AAA	Salt Lake City Gulls	Pacific Coast League	Moose Stubing
AA	Holyoke Millers	Eastern League	Jim Saul
A	Redwood Pioneers	California League	Chris Cannizzaro
A-Short Season	Salem Senators	Northwest League	Rick Ingalls
Rookie	Idaho Falls Angels	Pioneer League	Joe Maddon

Records
Preceded by 1980	California Angels seasons 1981	Succeeded by 1982
