= 1981 Boston Red Sox season =

Major League Baseball season

1981 Boston Red Sox
- League: American League
- Division: East
- Ballpark: Fenway Park
- City: Boston, Massachusetts
- Record: 1st half: 30–26 (.536); 2nd half: 29–23 (.558); Overall: 59–49 (.546)
- Divisional place: 1st half: 5th; 2nd half: 2nd
- Owners: Buddy LeRoux, Haywood Sullivan, Jean Yawkey
- President: Jean Yawkey
- General manager: Haywood Sullivan
- Manager: Ralph Houk
- Television: WSBK-TV, Ch. 38 (Ned Martin, Ken Harrelson)
- Radio: WITS-AM 1510 (Ken Coleman, Jon Miller)
- Stats: ESPN.com; Baseball Reference

The 1981 Boston Red Sox season was the 81st season in the franchise's Major League Baseball history. Due to the 1981 Major League Baseball strike, play during the regular season was suspended for 50 days, and the season was split into two halves, with playoff teams determined by records from each half of the season. In the first half of the season, the Red Sox finished fifth in the American League East with a record of 30 wins and 26 losses, four games behind the New York Yankees. In the second half of the season, the Red Sox finished tied for second in the division with a record of 29 wins and 23 losses, 1 1/2 games behind the Milwaukee Brewers. The Red Sox' overall record for the season was 59–49.

== Offseason ==
- October 27, 1980: the Red Sox lured Ralph Houk out of retirement to become the 35th manager in Red Sox history.
- December 10, 1980: The Red Sox traded shortstop Rick Burleson and third baseman Butch Hobson to the California Angels in exchange for Carney Lansford, former Red Sox player Rick Miller, and Mark Clear. Burleson was unhappy with his contract negotiations with the Red Sox and hinted at leaving via free agency.
- January 23, 1981: Fred Lynn and Steve Renko were traded by the Red Sox to the California Angels for Joe Rudi, Jim Dorsey and Frank Tanana.

== Regular season ==
Record by month
Month	Record		Cumulative		AL East		Ref.
Month	Won	Lost	Won	Lost	Position	GB	Ref.
April	7	9	7	9	5th	3 1/2	
May	18	12	25	21	5th	4	
June	5	5	30	26	5th	4	
	Second half						
August	11	9	11	9	3rd (tie)	1 1/2	
September	16	13	27	22	3rd	1 1/2	
October	2	1	29	23	2nd (tie)	1 1/2	

=== Season standings ===
AL East
Team	W	L	Pct.	GB	Home	Road
Milwaukee Brewers	62	47	.569	—	28‍–‍21	34‍–‍26
Baltimore Orioles	59	46	.562	1	33‍–‍22	26‍–‍24
New York Yankees	59	48	.551	2	32‍–‍19	27‍–‍29
Detroit Tigers	60	49	.550	2	32‍–‍23	28‍–‍26
Boston Red Sox	59	49	.546	2½	30‍–‍23	29‍–‍26
Cleveland Indians	52	51	.505	7	25‍–‍29	27‍–‍22
Toronto Blue Jays	37	69	.349	23½	17‍–‍36	20‍–‍33

AL East First Half Standings	W	L	Pct.	GB
New York Yankees	34	22	.607	—
Baltimore Orioles	31	23	.574	2
Milwaukee Brewers	31	25	.554	3
Detroit Tigers	31	26	.544	3 1/2
Boston Red Sox	30	26	.536	4
Cleveland Indians	26	24	.520	5
Toronto Blue Jays	16	42	.276	19

AL East Second Half Standings	W	L	Pct.	GB
Milwaukee Brewers	31	22	.585	—
Boston Red Sox	29	23	.558	1 1/2
Detroit Tigers	29	23	.558	1 1/2
Baltimore Orioles	28	23	.549	2
Cleveland Indians	26	27	.491	5
New York Yankees	25	26	.490	5
Toronto Blue Jays	21	27	.438	7 1/2

=== Record vs. opponents ===
1981 American League record Sources:
Team	BAL	BOS	CAL	CWS	CLE	DET	KC	MIL	MIN	NYY	OAK	SEA	TEX	TOR
Baltimore	—	2–2	6–6	3–6	4–2	6–7	5–3	2–4	6–0	7–6	7–5	4–2	2–1	5–2
Boston	2–2	—	2–4	5–4	7–6	6–1	3–3	6–7	2–5	3–3	7–5	9–3	3–6	4–0
California	6–6	4–2	—	6–7	7–5	3–3	0–6	4–3	3–3	2–2	2–8	6–4	2–4	6–6
Chicago	6–3	4–5	7–6	—	2–5	3–3	2–0	4–1	2–4	5–7	7–6	3–3	2–4	7–5
Cleveland	2–4	6–7	5–7	5–2	—	1–5	4–4	3–6	2–1	7–5	3–2	8–4	2–2	4–2
Detroit	7–6	1–6	3–3	3–3	5–1	—	3–2	5–8	9–3	3–7	1–2	5–1	9–3	6–4
Kansas City	3–5	3–3	6–0	0–2	4–4	2–3	—	4–5	9–4	2–10	3–3	6–7	3–4	5–3
Milwaukee	4–2	7–6	3–4	1–4	6–3	8–5	5–4	—	9–3	3–3	4–2	2–2	4–5	6–4
Minnesota	0–6	5–2	3–3	4–2	1–2	3–9	4–9	3–9	—	3–3	2–8	3–6–1	5–8	5–1
New York	6–7	3–3	2–2	7–5	5–7	7–3	10–2	3–3	3–3	—	4–3	2–3	5–4	2–3
Oakland	5–7	5–7	8–2	6–7	2–3	2–1	3–3	2–4	8–2	3–4	—	6–1	4–2	10–2
Seattle	2–4	3–9	4–6	3–3	4–8	1–5	7–6	2–2	6–3–1	3–2	1–6	—	5–8	3–3
Texas	1–2	6–3	4–2	4–2	2–2	3–9	4–3	5–4	8–5	4–5	2–4	8–5	—	6–2
Toronto	2–5	0–4	6–6	5–7	2–4	4–6	3–5	4–6	1–5	3–2	2–10	3–3	2–6	—

=== Notable transactions ===
- April 8, 1981: Dick Drago was traded by the Red Sox to the Seattle Mariners for Manny Sarmiento.
- June 8, 1981: Steve Lyons was drafted by the Red Sox in the 1st round (19th pick) of the 1981 Major League Baseball draft.

=== Opening Day lineup ===
24	Dwight Evans	RF
11	Dave Stapleton	2B
26	Joe Rudi	DH
14	Jim Rice	LF
5	Tony Pérez	1B
4	Carney Lansford	3B
18	Glenn Hoffman	SS
39	Gary Allenson	C
3	Rick Miller	CF
43	Dennis Eckersley	P

The Chicago White Sox defeated the Red Sox on Opening Day, 5–3. It was the first game that Carlton Fisk played for the White Sox, after 11 seasons with the Red Sox; Fisk hit a three-run home run in the eighth inning.

=== Roster ===
1981 Boston Red Sox
Roster
Pitchers: 45 Luis Aponte; 16 Tom Burgmeier; 22 Bill Campbell; 25 Mark Clear; 28 Steve Crawford; 43 Dennis Eckersley; 47 Bruce Hurst; 19 Bob Ojeda; 42 Chuck Rainey; 46 Bob Stanley; 40 Frank Tanana; 21 Mike Torrez; 30 John Tudor	Catchers: 39 Gary Allenson; 10 Rich Gedman; 29 John Lickert; 50 Dave Schmidt; Infielders: 18 Glenn Hoffman; 4 Carney Lansford; 5 Tony Pérez; 2 Jerry Remy; 11 Dave Stapleton; 12 Julio Valdez; 1 Chico Walker	Outfielders: 24 Dwight Evans; 37 Garry Hancock; 3 Rick Miller; 51 Reid Nichols; 17 Tom Poquette; 14 Jim Rice; Designated hitters: 26 Joe Rudi; 8 Carl Yastrzemski	Manager: 35 Ralph Houk; Coaches: 32 Tommy Harper (First base); 33 Walt Hriniak (Bullpen); 6 Johnny Pesky (Hitting); 34 Lee Stange (Pitching); 36 Eddie Yost (Third base)

== Player stats ==
= Indicates team leader

= Indicates league leader

=== Batting ===
Note: G = Games played; AB = At bats; R = Runs; H = Hits; 2B = Doubles; 3B = Triples; HR = Home runs; RBI = Runs batted in; SB = Stolen bases; BB = Walks; AVG = Batting average; SLG = Slugging average

Player	G	AB	R	H	2B	3B	HR	RBI	SB	BB	AVG	SLG
Jim Rice	108	451	51	128	18	1	17	62	2	34	.284	.441
Dwight Evans	108	412	84	122	19	4	22*	71	3	85	.296	.522
Carney Lansford	102	399	61	134	23	3	4	52	15	34	.336	.439
Jerry Remy	88	358	55	110	9	1	0	31	9	36	.307	.338
Dave Stapleton	93	355	45	101	17	1	10	42	0	21	.285	.423
Carl Yastrzemski	91	338	36	83	14	1	7	53	0	49	.246	.355
Rick Miller	97	316	38	92	17	2	2	33	3	28	.291	.377
Tony Pérez	84	306	35	77	11	3	9	39	0	27	.252	.395
Glenn Hoffman	78	242	28	56	10	0	1	20	0	12	.231	.285
Rich Gedman	62	205	22	59	15	0	5	26	0	9	.288	.434
Gary Allenson	47	139	23	31	8	0	5	25	0	23	.223	.388
Joe Rudi	49	122	14	22	3	0	6	24	0	8	.180	.352
Reid Nichols	39	48	13	9	0	1	0	3	0	2	.188	.229
Garry Hancock	26	45	4	7	3	0	0	3	0	2	.156	.222
Dave Schmidt	15	42	6	10	1	0	2	3	0	7	.238	.405
Julio Valdez	17	23	1	5	0	0	0	3	0	0	.217	.217
Chico Walker	6	17	3	6	0	0	0	2	0	1	.353	.353
Tom Poquette	3	2	0	0	0	0	0	0	0	0	.000	.000
John Lickert	1	0	0	0	0	0	0	0	0	0	.---	.---
Team totals	108	3820	519	1052	168	17	90	492	32	378	.275	.399

- Tied with Tony Armas (Oakland), Bobby Grich (California) and Eddie Murray (Baltimore) for league lead.

=== Pitching ===
Note: W = Wins; L = Losses; ERA = Earned run average; G = Games pitched; GS = Games started; SV = Saves; IP = Innings pitched; H = Hits allowed; R = Runs allowed; ER = Earned runs allowed; BB = Walks allowed; SO = Strikeouts

Player	W	L	ERA	G	GS	SV	IP	H	R	ER	BB	SO
Dennis Eckersley	9	8	4.27	23	23	0	154.0	160	82	73	35	79
Frank Tanana	4	10	4.01	24	23	0	141.1	142	70	63	43	78
Mike Torrez	10	3	3.68	22	22	0	127.1	130	61	52	51	54
Bob Stanley	10	8	3.83	35	1	0	98.2	110	46	42	38	28
John Tudor	4	3	4.58	18	11	1	78.2	74	44	40	28	44
Mark Clear	8	3	4.11	34	0	9	76.2	69	36	35	51	82
Bob Ojeda	6	2	3.12	10	10	0	66.1	50	25	23	25	28
Tom Burgmeier	4	5	2.87	32	0	6	59.2	61	23	19	17	35
Steve Crawford	0	5	4.99	14	11	0	57.2	69	38	32	18	29
Bill Campbell	1	1	3.17	30	0	7	48.1	45	23	17	20	37
Chuck Rainey	0	1	2.70	11	2	0	40.0	39	21	12	13	20
Bruce Hurst	2	0	4.30	5	5	0	23.0	23	11	11	12	11
Luis Aponte	1	0	0.57	7	0	1	15.2	11	1	1	3	11
Team totals	59	49	3.81	108	108	24	987.1	983	481	418	354	536

== Statistical leaders ==
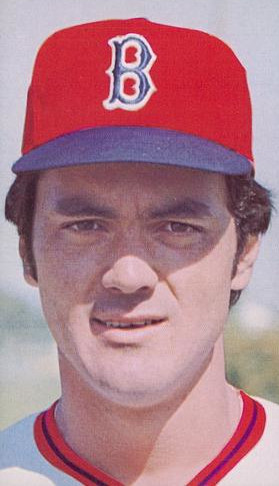
Dwight Evans

Category	Player	Statistic
Youngest player	Rich Gedman; John Lickert	21
Oldest player	Carl Yastrzemski	41
Wins Above Replacement	Dwight Evans	6.7

=== Batting ===
Abbr.	Category	Player	Statistic
G	Games played	Dwight Evans	108
G	Games played	Jim Rice	108
PA	Plate appearances	Dwight Evans	504
AB	At bats	Jim Rice	451
R	Runs scored	Dwight Evans	84
H	Hits	Carney Lansford	134
2B	Doubles	Carney Lansford	23
3B	Triples	Dwight Evans	4
HR	Home runs	Dwight Evans	22
RBI	Runs batted in	Dwight Evans	71
SB	Stolen bases	Carney Lansford	15
CS	Caught stealing	Carney Lansford	10
BB	Base on balls	Dwight Evans	85
SO	Strikeouts	Dwight Evans	85
BA	Batting average	Carney Lansford	.336
OBP	On-base percentage	Dwight Evans	.415
SLG	Slugging percentage	Dwight Evans	.522
OPS	On-base plus slugging	Dwight Evans	.937
OPS+	Adjusted OPS	Dwight Evans	163
TB	Total bases	Dwight Evans	215
GIDP	Grounded into double play	Jim Rice	14
HBP	Hit by pitch	Jim Rice	3
SH	Sacrifice hits	Jerry Remy	13
SF	Sacrifice flies	Jim Rice	7
IBB	Intentional base on balls	Carl Yastrzemski	4

=== Pitching ===
Abbr.	Category	Player	Statistic
W	Wins	Bob Stanley	10
W	Wins	Mike Torrez	10
L	Losses	Frank Tanana	10
W-L %	Winning percentage	Mike Torrez	.769 (10–3)
ERA	Earned run average	Mike Torrez	3.68
G	Games pitched	Bob Stanley	35
GS	Games started	Dennis Eckersley	23
GS	Games started	Frank Tanana	23
GF	Games finished	Bill Campbell	23
CG	Complete games	Dennis Eckersley	8
SHO	Shutouts	Dennis Eckersley	2
SHO	Shutouts	Frank Tanana	2
SV	Saves	Mark Clear	9
IP	Innings pitched	Dennis Eckersley	154
SO	Strikeouts	Mark Clear	82
WHIP	Walks plus hits per inning pitched	Dennis Eckersley	1.266

== Awards and honors ==
- Mark Clear – AL Pitcher of the Month (May)
- Dwight Evans – Silver Slugger Award (OF), Gold Glove Award (OF), AL Player of the Month (May)
- Carney Lansford – Silver Slugger Award (3B)

All-Star Game

- Dwight Evans, reserve OF

== Farm system ==
Level	Team	League	Manager
AAA	Pawtucket Red Sox	International League	Joe Morgan
AA	Bristol Red Sox	Eastern League	Tony Torchia
A	Winston-Salem Red Sox	Carolina League	Buddy Hunter
A	Winter Haven Red Sox	Florida State League	Rac Slider
A-Short Season	Elmira Suns	New York–Penn League	Dick Berardino

LEAGUE CHAMPIONS: Bristol
