= 1981 Baltimore Orioles season =

Major League Baseball season

1981 Baltimore Orioles
- League: American League
- Division: East
- Ballpark: Memorial Stadium
- City: Baltimore, Maryland
- Record: 1st half: 31–23 (.574); 2nd half: 28–23 (.549); Overall: 59–46 (.562)
- Divisional place: 1st half: 2nd (2 GB); 2nd half: 4th (2 GB)
- Owners: Edward Bennett Williams
- General managers: Hank Peters
- Managers: Earl Weaver
- Television: WMAR-TV
- Radio: WFBR (Chuck Thompson, Bill O'Donnell, Tom Marr)

The 1981 Baltimore Orioles season was the franchise's 28th season based in Baltimore and 81st overall season as a member of the American League. Games were suspended for 50 days due to the 1981 Major League Baseball strike, causing a split season. The Orioles competed as members of the American League East, finishing second in the first half of the season and fourth in the second half of the season; their overall record was 59 wins and 46 losses. The Orioles hit five grand slams, the most in MLB in 1981.

== Offseason ==
- December 15, 1980: Paul Hartzell was released by the Orioles.
- January 22, 1981: Joe Kerrigan and John Buffamoyer (minors) were traded by the Orioles to the Cincinnati Reds for Mike Grace and John Hale.

== Regular season ==
- August 10, 1981: Cal Ripken Jr. made his major league debut in a game against the Kansas City Royals.

=== Notable transactions ===
- April 1, 1981: Kiko Garcia was traded by the Orioles to the Houston Astros for Chris Bourjos and cash.
- June 8, 1981: 1981 Major League Baseball draft
  - Jeff Schaefer was drafted by the Orioles in the 12th round.
  - Cecil Fielder was drafted by the Orioles in the 31st round, but did not sign.

=== Season standings ===
AL East
Team	W	L	Pct.	GB	Home	Road
Milwaukee Brewers	62	47	.569	—	28‍–‍21	34‍–‍26
Baltimore Orioles	59	46	.562	1	33‍–‍22	26‍–‍24
New York Yankees	59	48	.551	2	32‍–‍19	27‍–‍29
Detroit Tigers	60	49	.550	2	32‍–‍23	28‍–‍26
Boston Red Sox	59	49	.546	2½	30‍–‍23	29‍–‍26
Cleveland Indians	52	51	.505	7	25‍–‍29	27‍–‍22
Toronto Blue Jays	37	69	.349	23½	17‍–‍36	20‍–‍33

AL East First Half Standings	W	L	Pct.	GB
New York Yankees	34	22	.607	—
Baltimore Orioles	31	23	.574	2
Milwaukee Brewers	31	25	.554	3
Detroit Tigers	31	26	.544	3 1/2
Boston Red Sox	30	26	.536	4
Cleveland Indians	26	24	.520	5
Toronto Blue Jays	16	42	.276	19

AL East Second Half Standings	W	L	Pct.	GB
Milwaukee Brewers	31	22	.585	—
Boston Red Sox	29	23	.558	1 1/2
Detroit Tigers	29	23	.558	1 1/2
Baltimore Orioles	28	23	.549	2
Cleveland Indians	26	27	.491	5
New York Yankees	25	26	.490	5
Toronto Blue Jays	21	27	.438	7 1/2

=== Record vs. opponents ===
1981 American League record Sources:
Team	BAL	BOS	CAL	CWS	CLE	DET	KC	MIL	MIN	NYY	OAK	SEA	TEX	TOR
Baltimore	—	2–2	6–6	3–6	4–2	6–7	5–3	2–4	6–0	7–6	7–5	4–2	2–1	5–2
Boston	2–2	—	2–4	5–4	7–6	6–1	3–3	6–7	2–5	3–3	7–5	9–3	3–6	4–0
California	6–6	4–2	—	6–7	7–5	3–3	0–6	4–3	3–3	2–2	2–8	6–4	2–4	6–6
Chicago	6–3	4–5	7–6	—	2–5	3–3	2–0	4–1	2–4	5–7	7–6	3–3	2–4	7–5
Cleveland	2–4	6–7	5–7	5–2	—	1–5	4–4	3–6	2–1	7–5	3–2	8–4	2–2	4–2
Detroit	7–6	1–6	3–3	3–3	5–1	—	3–2	5–8	9–3	3–7	1–2	5–1	9–3	6–4
Kansas City	3–5	3–3	6–0	0–2	4–4	2–3	—	4–5	9–4	2–10	3–3	6–7	3–4	5–3
Milwaukee	4–2	7–6	3–4	1–4	6–3	8–5	5–4	—	9–3	3–3	4–2	2–2	4–5	6–4
Minnesota	0–6	5–2	3–3	4–2	1–2	3–9	4–9	3–9	—	3–3	2–8	3–6–1	5–8	5–1
New York	6–7	3–3	2–2	7–5	5–7	7–3	10–2	3–3	3–3	—	4–3	2–3	5–4	2–3
Oakland	5–7	5–7	8–2	6–7	2–3	2–1	3–3	2–4	8–2	3–4	—	6–1	4–2	10–2
Seattle	2–4	3–9	4–6	3–3	4–8	1–5	7–6	2–2	6–3–1	3–2	1–6	—	5–8	3–3
Texas	1–2	6–3	4–2	4–2	2–2	3–9	4–3	5–4	8–5	4–5	2–4	8–5	—	6–2
Toronto	2–5	0–4	6–6	5–7	2–4	4–6	3–5	4–6	1–5	3–2	2–10	3–3	2–6	—

== Roster ==
1981 Baltimore Orioles roster
Roster
Pitchers: 52 Mike Boddicker; 46 Mike Flanagan; 21 Dave Ford; 36 Steve Luebber; 30 Dennis Martínez; 23 Tippy Martinez; 16 Scott McGregor; 22 Jim Palmer; 57 Jeff Schneider; 53 Sammy Stewart; 49 Tim Stoddard; 32 Steve Stone	Catchers: 24 Rick Dempsey; 37,41 Dan Graham; 59 Willie Royster; Infielders: 7 Mark Belanger; 2 Bobby Bonner; 25 Rich Dauer; 11 Doug DeCinces; 6 Wayne Krenchicki; 33 Eddie Murray; 8 Cal Ripken Jr.; 12 Lenn Sakata	Outfielders: 1 Al Bumbry; 15 Mark Corey; 28 Jim Dwyer; 38 John Lowenstein; 35 Gary Roenicke; 37 John Shelby; 29 Ken Singleton; 39 Dallas Williams; Other batters: 27 Benny Ayala; 10 Terry Crowley; 34 José Morales	Manager: 4 Earl Weaver; Coaches: 44 Elrod Hendricks; 31 Ray Miller; 47 Cal Ripken, Sr.; 54 Ralph Rowe; 40 Jimmy Williams

== Player stats ==
= Indicates team leader

= Indicates league leader

=== Batting ===
==== Starters by position ====
Note: Pos = Position; G = Games played; AB = At bats; H = Hits; Avg. = Batting average; HR = Home runs; RBI = Runs batted in

Pos	Player	G	AB	H	Avg.	HR	RBI
C	Rick Dempsey	92	251	54	.215	6	15
1B	Eddie Murray	99	378	111	.294	22*	78
2B	Rich Dauer	96	369	97	.263	4	38
3B	Doug DeCinces	100	346	91	.263	13	55
SS	Mark Belanger	64	139	23	.165	1	10
LF	John Lowenstein	83	189	47	.249	6	20
CF	Al Bumbry	101	392	107	.273	1	27
RF	Ken Singleton	103	363	101	.278	13	49
DH	Terry Crowley	68	134	33	.246	4	25

- Tied with Tony Armas (Oakland), Dwight Evans (Boston) and Bobby Grich (California) for league lead.

==== Other batters ====
Note: G = Games played; AB = At bats; H = Hits; Avg. = Batting average; HR = Home runs; RBI = Runs batted in

Player	G	AB	H	Avg.	HR	RBI
Gary Roenicke	85	219	59	.269	3	20
Lenn Sakata	61	150	34	.227	5	15
Dan Graham	55	142	25	.176	2	11
Jim Dwyer	68	134	30	.224	3	10
Benny Ayala	44	86	24	.279	3	13
José Morales	38	86	21	.244	2	14
Wayne Krenchicki	33	56	12	.214	0	6
Cal Ripken Jr.	23	39	5	.128	0	0
Bobby Bonner	10	27	8	.296	0	2
Mark Corey	10	8	0	.000	0	0
Willie Royster	4	4	0	.000	0	0
Dallas Williams	2	2	1	.500	0	0
John Shelby	7	2	0	.000	0	0

=== Pitching ===
==== Starting pitchers ====
Note: G = Games pitched; IP = Innings pitched; W = Wins; L = Losses; ERA = Earned run average; SO = Strikeouts

Player	G	IP	W	L	ERA	SO
Dennis Martínez	25	179.0	14*	5	3.32	88
Scott McGregor	24	160.0	13	5	3.26	82
Jim Palmer	22	127.1	7	8	3.75	35
Mike Flanagan	20	116.0	9	6	4.19	72
Steve Stone	15	62.2	4	7	4.60	30

- Tied with Steve McCatty (Oakland), Jack Morris (Detroit) and Pete Vuckovich (Milwaukee) for league lead.

==== Other pitchers ====
Note: G = Games pitched; IP = Innings pitched; W = Wins; L = Losses; ERA = Earned run average; SO = Strikeouts

Player	G	IP	W	L	ERA	SO
Sammy Stewart	29	112.1	4	8	2.32	57
Dave Ford	15	40.0	1	2	6.53	12

==== Relief pitchers ====
Note: G = Games pitched; W = Wins; L = Losses; SV = Saves; ERA = Earned run average; SO = Strikeouts

Player	G	W	L	SV	ERA	SO
Tippy Martinez	37	3	3	11	2.90	50
Tim Stoddard	31	4	2	7	3.86	32
Jeff Schneider	11	0	0	1	4.88	17
Steve Luebber	7	0	0	0	7.56	12
Mike Boddicker	2	0	0	0	4.76	2

== Awards and honors ==
- Dennis Martínez, American League Leader Victories (14)

All-Star Game

== Farm system ==
Level	Team	League	Manager
AAA	Rochester Red Wings	International League	Doc Edwards
AA	Charlotte O's	Southern League	Mark Wiley
A	Hagerstown Suns	Carolina League	Grady Little
A	Miami Orioles	Florida State League	Minnie Mendoza
Rookie	Bluefield Orioles	Appalachian League	Lance Nichols

LEAGUE CHAMPIONS: Hagerstown
