= 1981 Detroit Tigers season =

Major League Baseball season

1981 Detroit Tigers
- League: American League
- Division: East
- Ballpark: Tiger Stadium
- City: Detroit, Michigan
- Record: 1st half: 31–26 (.544); 2nd half: 29–23 (.558); Overall: 60–49 (.550)
- Divisional place: 1st half: 4th (3 1/2 GB); 2nd half: 2nd (tied; 1 1/2 GB)
- Owners: John Fetzer
- General managers: Jim Campbell
- Managers: Sparky Anderson
- Television: WDIV-TV (George Kell, Al Kaline); ONTV (Larry Adderley, Hank Aguirre, Norm Cash)
- Radio: WJR (Ernie Harwell, Paul Carey)

The 1981 Detroit Tigers season was the team's 81st season as a member of the American League. Games were suspended for 50 days due to the 1981 Major League Baseball strike, causing a split season. The Tigers finished the first half of the season in fourth place in the American League East, and the second half of the season tied for second place. Their overall record was 60 wins and 49 losses, and they outscored their opponents 427 to 404. The Tigers drew 1,149,144 fans to their home games at Tiger Stadium, ranking fifth of the 14 teams in the American League.

== Offseason ==
- December 12, 1980: Dave Stegman was traded by the Tigers to the San Diego Padres for Dennis Kinney.
- January 13, 1981: Mike Sharperson was drafted by the Tigers in the 4th round of the 1981 Major League Baseball draft, but did not sign.
- March 29, 1981: Jim Lentine was released by the Tigers.

== Regular season ==
=== Season standings ===
AL East
Team	W	L	Pct.	GB	Home	Road
Milwaukee Brewers	62	47	.569	—	28‍–‍21	34‍–‍26
Baltimore Orioles	59	46	.562	1	33‍–‍22	26‍–‍24
New York Yankees	59	48	.551	2	32‍–‍19	27‍–‍29
Detroit Tigers	60	49	.550	2	32‍–‍23	28‍–‍26
Boston Red Sox	59	49	.546	2½	30‍–‍23	29‍–‍26
Cleveland Indians	52	51	.505	7	25‍–‍29	27‍–‍22
Toronto Blue Jays	37	69	.349	23½	17‍–‍36	20‍–‍33

AL East First Half Standings	W	L	Pct.	GB
New York Yankees	34	22	.607	—
Baltimore Orioles	31	23	.574	2
Milwaukee Brewers	31	25	.554	3
Detroit Tigers	31	26	.544	3 1/2
Boston Red Sox	30	26	.536	4
Cleveland Indians	26	24	.520	5
Toronto Blue Jays	16	42	.276	19

AL East Second Half Standings	W	L	Pct.	GB
Milwaukee Brewers	31	22	.585	—
Boston Red Sox	29	23	.558	1 1/2
Detroit Tigers	29	23	.558	1 1/2
Baltimore Orioles	28	23	.549	2
Cleveland Indians	26	27	.491	5
New York Yankees	25	26	.490	5
Toronto Blue Jays	21	27	.438	7 1/2

=== Record vs. opponents ===
1981 American League record Sources:
Team	BAL	BOS	CAL	CWS	CLE	DET	KC	MIL	MIN	NYY	OAK	SEA	TEX	TOR
Baltimore	—	2–2	6–6	3–6	4–2	6–7	5–3	2–4	6–0	7–6	7–5	4–2	2–1	5–2
Boston	2–2	—	2–4	5–4	7–6	6–1	3–3	6–7	2–5	3–3	7–5	9–3	3–6	4–0
California	6–6	4–2	—	6–7	7–5	3–3	0–6	4–3	3–3	2–2	2–8	6–4	2–4	6–6
Chicago	6–3	4–5	7–6	—	2–5	3–3	2–0	4–1	2–4	5–7	7–6	3–3	2–4	7–5
Cleveland	2–4	6–7	5–7	5–2	—	1–5	4–4	3–6	2–1	7–5	3–2	8–4	2–2	4–2
Detroit	7–6	1–6	3–3	3–3	5–1	—	3–2	5–8	9–3	3–7	1–2	5–1	9–3	6–4
Kansas City	3–5	3–3	6–0	0–2	4–4	2–3	—	4–5	9–4	2–10	3–3	6–7	3–4	5–3
Milwaukee	4–2	7–6	3–4	1–4	6–3	8–5	5–4	—	9–3	3–3	4–2	2–2	4–5	6–4
Minnesota	0–6	5–2	3–3	4–2	1–2	3–9	4–9	3–9	—	3–3	2–8	3–6–1	5–8	5–1
New York	6–7	3–3	2–2	7–5	5–7	7–3	10–2	3–3	3–3	—	4–3	2–3	5–4	2–3
Oakland	5–7	5–7	8–2	6–7	2–3	2–1	3–3	2–4	8–2	3–4	—	6–1	4–2	10–2
Seattle	2–4	3–9	4–6	3–3	4–8	1–5	7–6	2–2	6–3–1	3–2	1–6	—	5–8	3–3
Texas	1–2	6–3	4–2	4–2	2–2	3–9	4–3	5–4	8–5	4–5	2–4	8–5	—	6–2
Toronto	2–5	0–4	6–6	5–7	2–4	4–6	3–5	4–6	1–5	3–2	2–10	3–3	2–6	—

=== Notable transactions ===
- April 3, 1981: Chris Codiroli was released by the Tigers.
- April 3, 1981: Chuck Hensley was released by the Tigers.
- August 23, 1981: The Tigers traded a player to be named later to the Minnesota Twins for Ron Jackson. The Tigers completed the deal by sending Tim Corcoran to the Twins on September 4.

=== Roster ===
1981 Detroit Tigers roster
Roster
Pitchers: 60 Howard Bailey; 41 George Cappuzzello; 29 Aurelio López; 47 Jack Morris; 46 Dan Petry; 42 Larry Rothschild; 19 Dave Rozema; 49 Dave Rucker; 31 Kevin Saucier; 36 Dan Schatzeder; 45 Dave Tobik; 28 Jerry Ujdur; 39 Milt Wilcox	Catchers: 15 Duffy Dyer; 17 Bill Fahey; 13 Lance Parrish; Infielders: 16 Tom Brookens; 12 Marty Castillo; 2 Richie Hebner; 15 Ron Jackson; 18 Mick Kelleher; 7 Rick Leach; 9 Stan Papi; 3 Alan Trammell; 1 Lou Whitaker	Outfielders: 34 Darrell Brown; 10 Al Cowens; 23 Kirk Gibson; 35 Lynn Jones; 33 Steve Kemp; 32 Rick Peters; Other batters: 24 Champ Summers; 14 John Wockenfuss	Manager: 11 Sparky Anderson; Coaches: 26 Gates Brown; 50 Billy Consolo; 38 Roger Craig; 51 Alex Grammas; 53 Dick Tracewski

== Player stats ==
= Indicates team leader

=== Batting ===
==== Starters by position ====
Note: Pos = Position; G = Games played; AB = At bats; H = Hits; Avg. = Batting average; HR = Home runs; RBI = Runs batted in

Pos	Player	G	AB	H	Avg.	HR	RBI
C	Lance Parrish	96	348	85	.244	10	46
1B	Richie Hebner	78	226	51	.226	5	28
2B	Lou Whitaker	109	335	88	.263	5	36
3B	Tom Brookens	71	239	58	.243	4	25
SS	Alan Trammell	105	392	101	.258	2	31
LF	Steve Kemp	105	372	103	.277	9	49
CF	Al Cowens	85	253	66	.261	1	18
RF	Kirk Gibson	83	290	95	.328	9	40
DH	John Wockenfuss	70	172	37	.215	9	25

==== Other batters ====
Note: G = Games played; AB = At bats; H = Hits; Avg. = Batting average; HR = Home runs; RBI = Runs batted in

Player	G	AB	H	Avg.	HR	RBI
Kirk Gibson	83	290	95	.328	9	40
Rick Peters	63	207	53	.256	0	15
Lynn Jones	71	174	45	.259	2	19
Champ Summers	64	165	42	.255	3	21
Ron Jackson	31	95	27	.284	1	12
Stan Papi	40	93	19	.204	3	12
Rick Leach	54	83	16	.193	1	11
Mick Kelleher	61	77	17	.221	0	6
Bill Fahey	27	67	17	.254	1	9
Darrell Brown	16	4	1	.250	0	0
Duffy Dyer	2	0	0	----	0	0

Note: pitchers' batting statistics not included

=== Pitching ===
==== Starting pitchers ====
Note: G = Games pitched; IP = Innings pitched; W = Wins; L = Losses; ERA = Earned run average; SO = Strikeouts

Player	G	IP	W	L	ERA	SO
Jack Morris	25	198.0	14	7	3.05	97
Milt Wilcox	24	166.1	12	9	3.03	79
Dan Petry	23	141.0	10	9	3.00	79
Dan Schatzeder	17	71.1	6	8	6.06	20
Jerry Ujdur	4	14.0	0	0	6.43	5

==== Other pitchers ====
Note: G = Games pitched; IP = Innings pitched; W = Wins; L = Losses; ERA = Earned run average; SO = Strikeouts

Player	G	IP	W	L	ERA	SO
Dave Rozema	28	104.0	5	5	3.63	46
Howard Bailey	9	36.2	1	4	7.36	17
George Cappuzzello	18	33.2	1	1	3.48	19

==== Relief pitchers ====
Note: G = Games pitched; W= Wins; L= Losses; SV = Saves; GF = Games finished; ERA = Earned run average; SO = Strikeouts

Player	G	W	L	SV	GF	ERA	SO
Kevin Saucier	38	4	2	13	23	1.65	23
Aurelio López	29	5	2	3	19	3.64	53
Dave Tobik	27	2	2	1	9	2.69	32
Dennis Kinney	6	0	0	0	0	9.82	3
Larry Rothschild	5	0	0	1	2	1.59	1
Dave Rucker	2	0	0	0	2	6.75	2

== Awards and honors ==
- Kirk Gibson, Tiger of the Year Award, from Detroit baseball writers
- Alan Trammell, AL Gold Glove Award, shortstop

1981 Major League Baseball All-Star Game

- Jack Morris, starter, pitcher

=== League top ten finishers ===
Kirk Gibson

- #3 in AL in batting average (.328)
- #4 in AL in Power/Speed Number (11.8)

Steve Kemp

- #4 in AL in on-base percentage (.389)
- #3 in AL in bases on balls (70)
- #3 in AL in times on base (174)

Jack Morris

- MLB leader in wins (14) (tied with four others)
- MLB leader in bases on balls allowed (78)
- #2 in MLB in innings pitched (198)
- #2 in MLB in games started (25)
- #3 in AL in hits allowed per 9 innings pitched (6.95)
- #3 in MLB in complete games (15)
- #3 in MLB in batters faced (798)
- #6 in AL in home runs allowed (14)
- #9 in AL in earned runs allowed (67)

Lance Parrish

- #3 in AL in times grounded into double plays (16)

Kevin Saucier

- #5 in AL in saves (13)

Alan Trammell

- AL leader in sacrifice hits (16)

Lou Whitaker

- AL leader in games played (109)
- AL leader in games at second base (108)
- AL leader in innings at second base (918-1/3)
- AL leader in assists by a second baseman (354)

Milt Wilcox

- #5 in AL in games started (24)
- #5 in AL in hit batsmen (6)

=== Players ranking among top 100 all time at position ===
The following members of the 1981 Detroit Tigers are among the Top 100 of all time at their position, as ranked by The Bill James Historical Baseball Abstract:

- Lance Parrish: 19th best catcher of all time
- Lou Whitaker: 13th best second baseman of all time
- Alan Trammell: 9th best shortstop of all time
- Kirk Gibson: 36th best left fielder of all time

== Farm system ==
Level	Team	League	Manager
AAA	Evansville Triplets	American Association	Jim Leyland
AA	Birmingham Barons	Southern League	Roy Majtyka
A	Lakeland Tigers	Florida State League	Ted Brazell
A	Macon Peaches	South Atlantic League	Tom Kotchman
Rookie	Bristol Tigers	Appalachian League	Joe Lewis
