= 1981 Cleveland Indians season =

1981 Cleveland Indians
- League: American League
- Division: East
- Ballpark: Cleveland Municipal Stadium
- City: Cleveland, Ohio
- Record: 1st half: 26–24 (.520); 2nd half: 26–27 (.491); Overall: 52–51 (.505)
- Divisional place: 1st half: 6th (5 GB); 2nd half: 5nd (tied; 5 GB)
- Owners: Steve O'Neill
- General managers: Phil Seghi
- Managers: Dave Garcia
- Television: WUAB
- Radio: WWWE

The 1981 Cleveland Indians season was the franchise's 81st season as a member of the American League. Games were suspended for 50 days due to the 1981 Major League Baseball strike, causing a split season. The Indians finished the first half of the season in sixth place in the American League East, and the second half of the season tied for fifth place. Managed by Dave Garcia, the Indians played their home games at Cleveland Stadium and had an overall record of 52 wins and 51 losses.

== Offseason ==
- December 8, 1980: Dan Spillner was signed as a free agent by the Indians.
- December 9, 1980: Gary Alexander, Víctor Cruz, Rafael Vásquez, and Bob Owchinko were traded by the Indians to the Pittsburgh Pirates for Bert Blyleven and Manny Sanguillén.

== Regular season ==
- May 15, 1981: Len Barker pitched a perfect game against the Toronto Blue Jays. It was the 10th perfect game in MLB history, and remains the most recent no-hitter thrown by an Indian. Barker was later selected to the All-Star Game.

=== Season standings ===
AL East
Team	W	L	Pct.	GB	Home	Road
Milwaukee Brewers	62	47	.569	—	28‍–‍21	34‍–‍26
Baltimore Orioles	59	46	.562	1	33‍–‍22	26‍–‍24
New York Yankees	59	48	.551	2	32‍–‍19	27‍–‍29
Detroit Tigers	60	49	.550	2	32‍–‍23	28‍–‍26
Boston Red Sox	59	49	.546	2½	30‍–‍23	29‍–‍26
Cleveland Indians	52	51	.505	7	25‍–‍29	27‍–‍22
Toronto Blue Jays	37	69	.349	23½	17‍–‍36	20‍–‍33

AL East First Half Standings	W	L	Pct.	GB
New York Yankees	34	22	.607	—
Baltimore Orioles	31	23	.574	2
Milwaukee Brewers	31	25	.554	3
Detroit Tigers	31	26	.544	3 1/2
Boston Red Sox	30	26	.536	4
Cleveland Indians	26	24	.520	5
Toronto Blue Jays	16	42	.276	19

AL East Second Half Standings	W	L	Pct.	GB
Milwaukee Brewers	31	22	.585	—
Boston Red Sox	29	23	.558	1 1/2
Detroit Tigers	29	23	.558	1 1/2
Baltimore Orioles	28	23	.549	2
Cleveland Indians	26	27	.491	5
New York Yankees	25	26	.490	5
Toronto Blue Jays	21	27	.438	7 1/2

=== Record vs. opponents ===
1981 American League record Sources:
Team	BAL	BOS	CAL	CWS	CLE	DET	KC	MIL	MIN	NYY	OAK	SEA	TEX	TOR
Baltimore	—	2–2	6–6	3–6	4–2	6–7	5–3	2–4	6–0	7–6	7–5	4–2	2–1	5–2
Boston	2–2	—	2–4	5–4	7–6	6–1	3–3	6–7	2–5	3–3	7–5	9–3	3–6	4–0
California	6–6	4–2	—	6–7	7–5	3–3	0–6	4–3	3–3	2–2	2–8	6–4	2–4	6–6
Chicago	6–3	4–5	7–6	—	2–5	3–3	2–0	4–1	2–4	5–7	7–6	3–3	2–4	7–5
Cleveland	2–4	6–7	5–7	5–2	—	1–5	4–4	3–6	2–1	7–5	3–2	8–4	2–2	4–2
Detroit	7–6	1–6	3–3	3–3	5–1	—	3–2	5–8	9–3	3–7	1–2	5–1	9–3	6–4
Kansas City	3–5	3–3	6–0	0–2	4–4	2–3	—	4–5	9–4	2–10	3–3	6–7	3–4	5–3
Milwaukee	4–2	7–6	3–4	1–4	6–3	8–5	5–4	—	9–3	3–3	4–2	2–2	4–5	6–4
Minnesota	0–6	5–2	3–3	4–2	1–2	3–9	4–9	3–9	—	3–3	2–8	3–6–1	5–8	5–1
New York	6–7	3–3	2–2	7–5	5–7	7–3	10–2	3–3	3–3	—	4–3	2–3	5–4	2–3
Oakland	5–7	5–7	8–2	6–7	2–3	2–1	3–3	2–4	8–2	3–4	—	6–1	4–2	10–2
Seattle	2–4	3–9	4–6	3–3	4–8	1–5	7–6	2–2	6–3–1	3–2	1–6	—	5–8	3–3
Texas	1–2	6–3	4–2	4–2	2–2	3–9	4–3	5–4	8–5	4–5	2–4	8–5	—	6–2
Toronto	2–5	0–4	6–6	5–7	2–4	4–6	3–5	4–6	1–5	3–2	2–10	3–3	2–6	—

=== Opening Day Lineup ===
Opening Day Starters
#	Name	Position
27	Miguel Diloné	DH
20	Rick Manning	CF
21	Mike Hargrove	1B
34	Joe Charboneau	LF
11	Toby Harrah	3B
6	Jorge Orta	RF
16	Bo Díaz	C
7	Alan Bannister	2B
15	Tom Veryzer	SS
28	Bert Blyleven	P

=== Roster ===
1981 Cleveland Indians roster
Roster
Pitchers: 39 Len Barker; 28 Bert Blyleven; 45 Tom Brennan; 40 John Denny; 17 Wayne Garland; 44 Ed Glynn; 35 Bob Lacey; 41 Dennis Lewallyn; 43 Sid Monge; 37 Dan Spillner; 46 Mike Stanton; 36 Rick Waits	Catchers: 23 Chris Bando; 16 Bo Díaz; 9 Ron Hassey; Infielders: 10 Jerry Dybzinski; 22 Mike Fischlin; 21 Mike Hargrove; 11 Toby Harrah; 18 Duane Kuiper; 30 Karl Pagel; 12 Dave Rosello; 15 Tom Veryzer	Outfielders: 7 Alan Bannister; 34 Joe Charboneau; 27 Miguel Diloné; 32 Larry Littleton; 20 Rick Manning; 6 Jorge Orta; 13 Ron Pruitt; Other batters: 8 Von Hayes; 25 Pat Kelly; 29 Andre Thornton	Manager: 1 Dave Garcia; Coaches: 4 Dave Duncan (Pitching); 14 Tommy McCraw (Hitting/First Base); 24 Joe Nossek (Third Base); 2 Dennis Sommers (Bullpen)

== Player stats ==
= Indicates team leader

=== Batting ===
Note: G = Games played; AB = At bats; R = Runs scored; H = Hits; 2B = Doubles; 3B = Triples; HR = Home runs; RBI = Runs batted in; AVG = Batting average; SB = Stolen bases

Player	G	AB	R	H	2B	3B	HR	RBI	AVG	SB
Chris Bando	21	47	3	10	3	0	0	6	.213	0
Alan Bannister	68	232	36	61	11	1	1	17	.263	16
Joe Charboneau	48	138	14	29	7	1	4	18	.210	1
Bo Díaz	63	182	25	57	19	0	7	38	.313	2
Miguel Dilone	72	269	33	78	5	5	0	19	.290	29
Jerry Dybzinski	48	57	10	17	0	0	0	6	.298	7
Mike Fischlin	22	43	3	10	1	0	0	5	.233	3
Mike Hargrove	94	322	43	102	21	0	2	49	.317	5
Toby Harrah	103	361	64	105	12	4	5	44	.291	12
Ron Hassey	61	190	8	44	4	0	1	25	.232	0
Von Hayes	43	109	21	28	8	2	1	17	.257	8
Pat Kelly	48	75	8	16	4	0	1	16	.213	2
Duane Kuiper	72	206	15	53	6	0	0	14	.257	1
Larry Littleton	26	23	2	0	0	0	0	1	.000	0
Rick Manning	103	360	47	88	15	3	4	33	.244	25
Jorge Orta	88	338	50	92	14	3	5	34	.272	4
Karl Pagel	14	15	3	4	0	2	1	4	.267	0
Ron Pruitt	5	9	0	0	0	0	0	0	.000	0
Dave Rosello	43	84	11	20	4	0	1	7	.238	0
Andre Thornton	69	226	22	54	12	0	6	30	.239	3
Tom Veryzer	75	221	13	54	4	0	0	14	.244	1
Team totals	103	3507	431	922	150	21	39	397	.263	119

=== Pitching ===
= Indicates league leader

Note: W = Wins; L = Losses; ERA = Earned run average; G = Games pitched; GS = Games started; SV = Saves; IP = Innings pitched; H = Hits allowed; R = Runs allowed; ER = Earned runs allowed; BB = Walks allowed; K = Strikeouts

Player	W	L	ERA	G	GS	SV	IP	H	R	ER	BB	K
Len Barker	8	7	3.91	22	22	0	154.1	150	72	67	46	127
Bert Blyleven	11	7	2.88	20	20	0	159.1	145	52	51	40	107
Tom Brennan	2	2	3.17	7	6	0	48.1	49	20	17	14	15
John Denny	10	6	3.15	19	19	0	145.2	139	62	51	66	94
Wayne Garland	3	7	5.79	12	10	0	56.0	89	40	36	14	15
Ed Glynn	0	0	1.17	4	0	0	7.2	5	1	1	4	4
Bob Lacey	0	0	7.59	14	0	0	21.1	36	20	18	3	11
Dennis Lewallyn	0	0	5.40	7	0	0	13.1	16	8	8	2	11
Sid Monge	3	5	4.34	31	0	4	58.0	58	31	28	21	41
Dan Spillner	4	4	3.14	32	5	7	97.1	86	41	34	39	59
Mike Stanton	3	3	4.36	24	0	2	43.1	43	21	21	18	34
Rick Waits	8	10	4.92	22	21	0	126.1	173	74	69	44	51
Team totals	52	51	3.88	103	103	13	931.0	989	442	401	311	569

== Awards and honors ==
All-Star Game

- Len Barker, Reserve
- Bo Diaz, Catcher, Reserve

== Farm system ==
Level	Team	League	Manager
AAA	Charleston Charlies	International League	Cal Emery and Frank Lucchesi
AA	Chattanooga Lookouts	Southern League	Woody Smith
A	Waterloo Indians	Midwest League	Gomer Hodge
A-Short Season	Batavia Trojans	New York–Penn League	Dave Oliver
