= Jeff Schattinger =

American baseball player (born 1955)

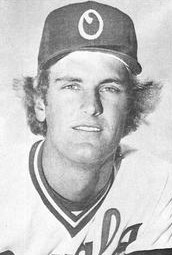
- Schattinger in 1980
- Pitcher
- Born: October 25, 1955 (age 70); Fresno, California, U.S.
- Batted: Left Threw: Right

MLB debut
- September 21, 1981, for the Kansas City Royals

Last MLB appearance
- September 21, 1981, for the Kansas City Royals

MLB statistics
- Innings pitched: 3.0
- Earned run average: 0.00
- Strikeouts: 1
- Stats at Baseball Reference

Teams
- Kansas City Royals (1981)

Jeffrey Charles Schattinger (born October 25, 1955) is an American former professional baseball pitcher. He played in one game for the Kansas City Royals of the Major League Baseball (MLB) on September 21 during the 1981 season.
