= 1981 Chicago White Sox season =

1981 Chicago White Sox
- League: American League
- Division: West
- Ballpark: Comiskey Park
- City: Chicago
- Owners: Jerry Reinsdorf
- General managers: Roland Hemond
- Managers: Tony La Russa
- Television: WGN-TV (Harry Caray, Jimmy Piersall, Lou Brock)
- Radio: WBBM (AM) (Harry Caray, Joe McConnell, Rich King)

The 1981 Chicago White Sox season was the White Sox's 81st season in the major leagues, and their 82nd season overall. They finished with a record of 54–52, good enough for third place in the American League West, 8.5 games behind the first place Oakland Athletics. However, due to a player's strike, the Athletics would play the 50-53 Kansas City Royals, who had finished behind the White Sox.

Owner Bill Veeck attempted to sell the club to Ed DeBartolo, but the offer was turned down by the other owners. Veeck was then forced to sell to a different investment group headed by Jerry Reinsdorf and Eddie Einhorn.

== Offseason ==
- October 6, 1980: Minnie Miñoso was released by the White Sox.
- November 26, 1980: Ron LeFlore was signed as a free agent by the White Sox.
- March 18, 1981: Carlton Fisk was signed as a free agent by the White Sox.
- March 28, 1981: Ken Kravec was traded by the White Sox to the Chicago Cubs for Dennis Lamp.
- March 30, 1981: Greg Luzinski purchased from Philadelphia Phillies.

== Regular season ==
=== Season standings ===
AL West
Team	W	L	Pct.	GB	Home	Road
Oakland Athletics	64	45	.587	—	35‍–‍21	29‍–‍24
Texas Rangers	57	48	.543	5	32‍–‍24	25‍–‍24
Chicago White Sox	54	52	.509	8½	25‍–‍24	29‍–‍28
Kansas City Royals	50	53	.485	11	19‍–‍28	31‍–‍25
California Angels	51	59	.464	13½	26‍–‍28	25‍–‍31
Seattle Mariners	44	65	.404	20	20‍–‍37	24‍–‍28
Minnesota Twins	41	68	.376	23	24‍–‍36	17‍–‍32

AL West First Half Standings	W	L	Pct.	GB
Oakland Athletics	37	23	.617	—
Texas Rangers	33	22	.600	1 1/2
Chicago White Sox	31	22	.585	2 1/2
California Angels	31	29	.517	6
Kansas City Royals	20	30	.400	12
Seattle Mariners	21	36	.368	14 1/2
Minnesota Twins	17	39	.304	18

AL West Second Half Standings	W	L	Pct.	GB
Kansas City Royals	30	23	.566	—
Oakland Athletics	27	22	.551	1
Texas Rangers	24	26	.480	4 1/2
Minnesota Twins	24	29	.453	6
Seattle Mariners	23	29	.442	6 1/2
Chicago White Sox	23	30	.434	7
California Angels	20	30	.400	8 1/2

=== Record vs. opponents ===
1981 American League record Sources:
Team	BAL	BOS	CAL	CWS	CLE	DET	KC	MIL	MIN	NYY	OAK	SEA	TEX	TOR
Baltimore	—	2–2	6–6	3–6	4–2	6–7	5–3	2–4	6–0	7–6	7–5	4–2	2–1	5–2
Boston	2–2	—	2–4	5–4	7–6	6–1	3–3	6–7	2–5	3–3	7–5	9–3	3–6	4–0
California	6–6	4–2	—	6–7	7–5	3–3	0–6	4–3	3–3	2–2	2–8	6–4	2–4	6–6
Chicago	6–3	4–5	7–6	—	2–5	3–3	2–0	4–1	2–4	5–7	7–6	3–3	2–4	7–5
Cleveland	2–4	6–7	5–7	5–2	—	1–5	4–4	3–6	2–1	7–5	3–2	8–4	2–2	4–2
Detroit	7–6	1–6	3–3	3–3	5–1	—	3–2	5–8	9–3	3–7	1–2	5–1	9–3	6–4
Kansas City	3–5	3–3	6–0	0–2	4–4	2–3	—	4–5	9–4	2–10	3–3	6–7	3–4	5–3
Milwaukee	4–2	7–6	3–4	1–4	6–3	8–5	5–4	—	9–3	3–3	4–2	2–2	4–5	6–4
Minnesota	0–6	5–2	3–3	4–2	1–2	3–9	4–9	3–9	—	3–3	2–8	3–6–1	5–8	5–1
New York	6–7	3–3	2–2	7–5	5–7	7–3	10–2	3–3	3–3	—	4–3	2–3	5–4	2–3
Oakland	5–7	5–7	8–2	6–7	2–3	2–1	3–3	2–4	8–2	3–4	—	6–1	4–2	10–2
Seattle	2–4	3–9	4–6	3–3	4–8	1–5	7–6	2–2	6–3–1	3–2	1–6	—	5–8	3–3
Texas	1–2	6–3	4–2	4–2	2–2	3–9	4–3	5–4	8–5	4–5	2–4	8–5	—	6–2
Toronto	2–5	0–4	6–6	5–7	2–4	4–6	3–5	4–6	1–5	3–2	2–10	3–3	2–6	—

=== Opening Day lineup ===
- Ron LeFlore, LF
- Mike Squires, 1B
- Carlton Fisk, C
- Greg Luzinski, DH
- Chet Lemon, CF
- Harold Baines, RF
- Jim Morrison, 3B
- Tony Bernazard, 2B
- Bill Almon, SS
- Britt Burns, P

=== Notable transactions ===
- April 1, 1981: Thad Bosley was traded by the White Sox to the Milwaukee Brewers for John Poff.
- July 18, 1981: George Riley was signed as a free agent by the White Sox.
- August 30, 1981: Ivan Mesa (minors), Ronnie Perry (minors), a player to be named later, and cash were traded by the White Sox to the Minnesota Twins for Jerry Koosman. The White Sox completed the deal by sending Randy Johnson to the Twins on September 2.

=== Roster ===
1981 Chicago White Sox
Roster
Pitchers: 50 Juan Agosto; 46 Francisco Barrios; 30 Ross Baumgarten; 40 Britt Burns; 49 Richard Dotson; 22 Ed Farmer; 45 Kevin Hickey; 31 LaMarr Hoyt; 36 Jerry Koosman; 53 Dennis Lamp; 27 Lynn McGlothen; 51 Reggie Patterson; 35 Dewey Robinson; 33 Steve Trout	Catchers: 16 Jim Essian; 72 Carlton Fisk; 7 Marc Hill; Infielders: 34 Bill Almon; 14 Tony Bernazard; 23 Lamar Johnson; 32 Jay Loviglio; 12 Jim Morrison; 11 Greg Pryor; 25 Mike Squires	Outfielders: 3 Harold Baines; 17 Jerry Hairston; 47 Rusty Kuntz; 8 Ron LeFlore; 44 Chet Lemon; 5 Bob Molinaro; 20 Wayne Nordhagen; 48 Leo Sutherland; 24 Jerry Turner; Other batters: 19 Greg Luzinski	Manager: 10 Tony La Russa; Coaches: 42 Loren Babe; 15 Art Kusnyer; 9 Minnie Miñoso; -- Dave Nelson; 28 Vada Pinson; 37 Ron Schueler; 1 Bobby Winkles

== Player stats ==
= Indicates team leader

=== Batting ===
Note: G = Games played; AB = At bats; R = Runs scored; H = Hits; 2B = Doubles; 3B = Triples; HR = Home runs; RBI = Runs batted in; BB = Base on balls; SO = Strikeouts; AVG = Batting average; SB = Stolen bases

Player	G	AB	R	H	2B	3B	HR	RBI	BB	SO	AVG	SB
Bill Almon, SS	103	349	46	105	10	2	4	41	21	60	.301	16
Harold Baines, RF	82	280	42	80	11	7	10	41	12	41	.286	6
Tony Bernazard, 2B	106	384	53	106	14	4	6	34	54	66	.276	4
Jim Essian, C	27	52	6	16	3	0	0	5	4	5	.308	0
Carlton Fisk, C	96	338	44	89	12	0	7	45	38	37	.263	3
Jerry Hairston, OF	9	25	5	7	1	0	1	6	2	4	.280	0
Marc Hill, C	16	6	0	0	0	0	0	0	0	1	.000	0
Lamar Johnson, 1B, DH	41	134	10	37	7	0	1	15	5	14	.276	0
Rusty Kuntz, OF, DH	67	55	15	14	2	0	0	4	6	8	.255	1
Ron LeFlore, LF, CF	82	337	46	83	10	4	0	24	28	70	.246	36
Chet Lemon, CF	94	328	50	99	23	6	9	50	33	48	.302	5
Jay Loviglio, 3B, 2B	14	15	5	4	0	0	0	2	1	1	.267	2
Greg Luzinski, DH	104	378	55	100	15	1	21	62	58	80	.265	0
Bob Molinaro, OF, DH	47	42	7	11	1	1	1	9	8	1	.262	1
Jim Morrison, 3B	90	290	27	68	8	1	10	34	10	29	.234	3
Wayne Nordhagen, OF	65	208	19	64	8	1	6	33	10	25	.308	0
Greg Pryor, 3B, SS, 2B	47	76	4	17	1	0	0	6	6	8	.281	0
Mike Squires, 1B	92	294	35	78	9	0	0	25	22	17	.265	7
Leo Sutherland, OF	11	12	6	2	0	0	0	0	3	1	.167	2
Jerry Turner, RF	10	12	1	2	0	0	0	2	1	2	.167	0
Team totals	106	3615	476	982	135	27	76	438	322	518	.272	86

=== Pitching ===
Note: W = Wins; L = Losses; ERA = Earned run average; G = Games pitched; GS = Games started; SV = Saves; IP = Innings pitched; H = Hits allowed; R = Runs allowed; ER = Earned runs allowed; HR = Home runs allowed; BB = Walks allowed; K = Strikeouts

Player	W	L	ERA	G	GS	SV	IP	H	R	ER	HR	BB	K
Juan Agosto	0	0	4.76	2	0	0	5.2	5	3	3	1	0	3
Francisco Barrios	1	3	3.96	8	7	0	36.1	45	23	16	3	15	12
Ross Baumgarten	5	9	4.07	19	19	0	101.2	101	56	46	9	43	52
Britt Burns	10	6	2.64	24	23	0	156.2	139	52	46	14	50	108
Richard Dotson	9	8	3.77	24	24	0	141.0	145	67	59	13	49	73
Ed Farmer	3	3	4.61	42	0	10	52.2	53	33	27	5	35	42
Kevin Hickey	0	2	3.65	41	0	3	44.1	38	22	18	3	23	17
LaMarr Hoyt	9	3	3.57	43	1	10	90.2	80	40	36	10	29	60
Jerry Koosman	1	4	3.33	8	3	0	27.0	27	10	10	2	7	21
Dennis Lamp	7	6	2.41	27	10	0	127.0	103	41	34	4	44	71
Lynn McGlothen	0	0	4.15	11	0	0	21.2	14	10	10	0	10	12
Reggie Patterson	0	1	13.50	6	1	0	7.1	14	11	11	1	6	2
Dewey Robinson	1	0	4.50	4	0	0	4.0	5	2	2	1	4	2
Steve Trout	8	7	3.47	20	18	0	124.2	122	53	48	7	38	54
Team totals	54	52	3.47	106	106	23	940.2	891	423	363	73	353	529

== Farm system ==
Level	Team	League	Manager
AAA	Edmonton Trappers	Pacific Coast League	Gordon Lund
AA	Glens Falls White Sox	Eastern League	Jim Mahoney
A	Appleton Foxes	Midwest League	Sam Ewing
Rookie	GCL White Sox	Gulf Coast League	John Boles
