= 1981 Kansas City Royals season =

1981 Kansas City Royals
- League: American League
- Division: West
- Ballpark: Royals Stadium
- City: Kansas City, Missouri
- Record: 50–53 (.485)
- Divisional place: 4th
- Owners: Ewing Kauffman
- General managers: Joe Burke
- Managers: Jim Frey and Dick Howser
- Television: WDAF-TV 4 (Al Wisk, Denny Trease)
- Radio: WIBW–AM 580; KMBZ–AM 980 (Denny Matthews, Fred White)

The 1981 Kansas City Royals season was their 13th in Major League Baseball. The 1981 season was interrupted by a players strike from June 12 to July 31, and resumed on August 10. Major League Baseball officials decided to split the season, and the division winners of both halves would advance to the playoffs. The Royals were 20–30 and in fifth place in the American League West when the strike began, but won the second half with a 30–23 mark. Dick Howser replaced Jim Frey as manager on August 31. Kansas City's overall 50–53 record made the Royals the first team in MLB history to reach the postseason with a losing mark. Kansas City lost to the first half American League West winner Oakland Athletics 3–0 in the ALDS.

== Offseason ==
- January 6, 1981: Derek Botelho was signed as a free agent with the Kansas City Royals.

== Regular season ==
- August 10, 1981: Cal Ripken Jr. made his major league debut for the Baltimore Orioles in a game against the Royals.

=== Season standings ===
AL West
Team	W	L	Pct.	GB	Home	Road
Oakland Athletics	64	45	.587	—	35‍–‍21	29‍–‍24
Texas Rangers	57	48	.543	5	32‍–‍24	25‍–‍24
Chicago White Sox	54	52	.509	8½	25‍–‍24	29‍–‍28
Kansas City Royals	50	53	.485	11	19‍–‍28	31‍–‍25
California Angels	51	59	.464	13½	26‍–‍28	25‍–‍31
Seattle Mariners	44	65	.404	20	20‍–‍37	24‍–‍28
Minnesota Twins	41	68	.376	23	24‍–‍36	17‍–‍32

AL West First Half Standings	W	L	Pct.	GB
Oakland Athletics	37	23	.617	—
Texas Rangers	33	22	.600	1 1/2
Chicago White Sox	31	22	.585	2 1/2
California Angels	31	29	.517	6
Kansas City Royals	20	30	.400	12
Seattle Mariners	21	36	.368	14 1/2
Minnesota Twins	17	39	.304	18

AL West Second Half Standings	W	L	Pct.	GB
Kansas City Royals	30	23	.566	—
Oakland Athletics	27	22	.551	1
Texas Rangers	24	26	.480	4 1/2
Minnesota Twins	24	29	.453	6
Seattle Mariners	23	29	.442	6 1/2
Chicago White Sox	23	30	.434	7
California Angels	20	30	.400	8 1/2

=== Record vs. opponents ===
1981 American League record Sources:
Team	BAL	BOS	CAL	CWS	CLE	DET	KC	MIL	MIN	NYY	OAK	SEA	TEX	TOR
Baltimore	—	2–2	6–6	3–6	4–2	6–7	5–3	2–4	6–0	7–6	7–5	4–2	2–1	5–2
Boston	2–2	—	2–4	5–4	7–6	6–1	3–3	6–7	2–5	3–3	7–5	9–3	3–6	4–0
California	6–6	4–2	—	6–7	7–5	3–3	0–6	4–3	3–3	2–2	2–8	6–4	2–4	6–6
Chicago	6–3	4–5	7–6	—	2–5	3–3	2–0	4–1	2–4	5–7	7–6	3–3	2–4	7–5
Cleveland	2–4	6–7	5–7	5–2	—	1–5	4–4	3–6	2–1	7–5	3–2	8–4	2–2	4–2
Detroit	7–6	1–6	3–3	3–3	5–1	—	3–2	5–8	9–3	3–7	1–2	5–1	9–3	6–4
Kansas City	3–5	3–3	6–0	0–2	4–4	2–3	—	4–5	9–4	2–10	3–3	6–7	3–4	5–3
Milwaukee	4–2	7–6	3–4	1–4	6–3	8–5	5–4	—	9–3	3–3	4–2	2–2	4–5	6–4
Minnesota	0–6	5–2	3–3	4–2	1–2	3–9	4–9	3–9	—	3–3	2–8	3–6–1	5–8	5–1
New York	6–7	3–3	2–2	7–5	5–7	7–3	10–2	3–3	3–3	—	4–3	2–3	5–4	2–3
Oakland	5–7	5–7	8–2	6–7	2–3	2–1	3–3	2–4	8–2	3–4	—	6–1	4–2	10–2
Seattle	2–4	3–9	4–6	3–3	4–8	1–5	7–6	2–2	6–3–1	3–2	1–6	—	5–8	3–3
Texas	1–2	6–3	4–2	4–2	2–2	3–9	4–3	5–4	8–5	4–5	2–4	8–5	—	6–2
Toronto	2–5	0–4	6–6	5–7	2–4	4–6	3–5	4–6	1–5	3–2	2–10	3–3	2–6	—

=== Notable transactions ===
- April 3, 1981: Bombo Rivera was signed as a free agent by the Royals.
- June 8, 1981: 1981 Major League Baseball draft
  - Dave Leeper was drafted by the Royals in the 1st round (23rd pick). Player signed June 10, 1981.
  - David Cone was drafted by the Royals in the 3rd round. Player signed June 10, 1981.

=== Roster ===
1981 Kansas City Royals roster
Roster
Pitchers: 37 Juan Berenguer; 25 Ken Brett; 38 Rich Gale; 32 Larry Gura; 33 Atlee Hammaker; 40 Mike Jones; 22 Dennis Leonard; 27 Renie Martin; 28 Bill Paschall; 29 Dan Quisenberry; 31 Jeff Schattinger; 34 Paul Splittorff; 21 Jim Wright	Catchers: 15 Jerry Grote; 39 Greg Keatley; 9 Jamie Quirk; 12 John Wathan; Infielders: 24 Willie Aikens; 5 George Brett; 7 Dave Chalk; 2 Onix Concepción; 17 Tim Ireland; 14 Lee May; 18 Rance Mulliniks; 16,52 Ken Phelps; 30 U L Washington; 20 Frank White	Outfielders: 45 Danny Garcia; 23 César Gerónimo; 10 Clint Hurdle; 4 Darryl Motley; 26 Amos Otis; 37 Pat Sheridan; 6 Willie Wilson; Other batters: 11 Hal McRae	Manager: 41 Jim Frey; 21 Dick Howser; Coaches: 36 Billy Connors; 43 Gordon Mackenzie; 42 José Martínez; 46 Rick Renick; 44 Jimmie Schaffer

== Player stats ==
= Indicates team leader

=== Batting ===
==== Starters by position ====
Note: Pos = Position; G = Games played; AB = At bats; H = Hits; Avg. = Batting average; HR = Home runs; RBI = Runs batted in

Pos	Player	G	AB	H	Avg.	HR	RBI
C	John Wathan	89	301	76	.252	1	19
1B	Willie Aikens	101	349	93	.266	17	53
2B	Frank White	94	364	91	.250	9	38
SS	U L Washington	98	339	77	.227	2	29
3B	George Brett	89	347	109	.314	6	43
LF	Willie Wilson	102	439	133	.303	1	32
CF	Amos Otis	99	372	100	.269	9	57
RF	Darryl Motley	42	125	29	.232	2	8
DH	Hal McRae	101	389	106	.272	7	36

==== Other batters ====
Note: G = Games played; AB = At bats; H = Hits; Avg. = Batting average; HR = Home runs; RBI = Runs batted in

Player	G	AB	H	Avg.	HR	RBI
César Gerónimo	59	118	29	.246	2	13
Jamie Quirk	46	100	25	.250	0	10
Clint Hurdle	28	76	25	.329	4	15
Jerry Grote	22	56	17	.304	1	9
Lee May	26	55	16	.291	0	8
Dave Chalk	27	49	11	.224	0	5
Rance Mulliniks	24	44	10	.227	0	5
Ken Phelps	21	22	3	.136	0	1
Danny Garcia	12	14	2	.143	0	0
Pat Sheridan	3	1	0	.000	0	0
Tim Ireland	4	0	0	----	0	0
Onix Concepción	2	0	0	----	0	0
Greg Keatley	2	0	0	----	0	0

=== Pitching ===
==== Starting pitchers ====
Note: G = Games pitched; IP = Innings pitched; W = Wins; L = Losses; ERA = Earned run average; SO = Strikeouts

Player	G	IP	W	L	ERA	SO
Dennis Leonard	26	201.2	13	11	2.99	107
Larry Gura	23	172.1	11	8	2.72	61
Rich Gale	19	101.2	6	6	5.40	47
Paul Splittorff	21	99.0	5	5	4.36	48
Mike Jones	12	75.2	6	3	3.21	29

==== Other pitchers ====
Note: G = Games pitched; IP = Innings pitched; W = Wins; L = Losses; ERA = Earned run average; SO = Strikeouts

Player	G	IP	W	L	ERA	SO
Jim Wright	17	52.0	2	3	3.46	27
Atlee Hammaker	10	39.0	1	3	5.54	11
Juan Berenguer	8	19.2	0	4	8.69	20

==== Relief pitchers ====
Note: G = Games pitched; W = Wins; L = Losses; SV = Saves; ERA = Earned run average; SO = Strikeouts

Player	G	W	L	SV	ERA	SO
Dan Quisenberry	40	1	4	18	1.73	20
Renie Martin	29	4	5	4	2.77	25
Ken Brett	22	1	1	2	4.18	7
Bill Paschall	2	0	0	0	4.50	1
Jeff Schattinger	1	0	0	0	0.00	1

== ALDS ==
Oakland wins series, 3–0.

Game	Score	Date
1	Oakland 4, Kansas City 0	October 6
2	Oakland 2, Kansas City 1	October 7
3	Oakland 4, Kansas City 1	October 9

== Farm system ==
Level	Team	League	Manager
AAA	Omaha Royals	American Association	Joe Sparks
AA	Jacksonville Suns	Southern League	Gene Lamont
A	Fort Myers Royals	Florida State League	Brian Murphy
A	Charleston Royals	South Atlantic League	Rick Mathews
Rookie	GCL Royals Blue	Gulf Coast League	Joe Jones
Rookie	GCL Royals Gold	Gulf Coast League	Roy Tanner

LEAGUE CHAMPIONS: GCL Royals Gold
