= Len Barker =

American baseball player (born 1955)

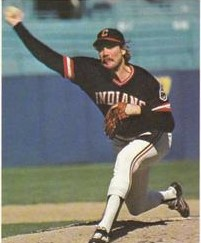
- Pitcher
- Born: July 7, 1955 (age 70); Fort Knox, Kentucky, U.S.
- Batted: Right Threw: Right

MLB debut
- September 14, 1976, for the Texas Rangers

Last MLB appearance
- September 26, 1987, for the Milwaukee Brewers

MLB statistics
- Win–loss record: 74–76
- Earned run average: 4.34
- Strikeouts: 975
- Stats at Baseball Reference

Teams
- Texas Rangers (1976–1978); Cleveland Indians (1979–1983); Atlanta Braves (1983–1985); Milwaukee Brewers (1987)

Career highlights and awards
- All-Star (1981); 2× AL strikeout leader (1980, 1981); Pitched a perfect game on May 15, 1981

Leonard Harold Barker III (born July 7, 1955) is an American former Major League Baseball right-handed starting pitcher. He pitched the tenth perfect game in baseball history. Barker pitched with the Texas Rangers (1976–78), Cleveland Indians (1979–83), Atlanta Braves (1983–85) and Milwaukee Brewers (1987). During an 11-year baseball career, Barker compiled 74 wins, 975 strikeouts, and a 4.34 earned run average.

== Playing career ==
=== Early career ===
Barker was a hard thrower, who early in his career struggled with his control. On April 16, 1978, at Fenway Park, Barker (then with the Texas Rangers) threw a pitch that sailed upward onto the screen above and behind the backstop. Partly due to this, he did not make the major leagues for good until 1979.

Barker was traded, along with Bobby Bonds, from the Rangers to the Indians for Jim Kern and Larvell Blanks on October 3, 1978. His best season statistically was 1980, when he enjoyed career-highs in wins (19) and strikeouts (181, best in the American League).

=== 1981 perfect game ===
Barker's most notable accomplishment occurred on May 15, 1981, as a member of the Cleveland Indians. On a cold, damp night in Cleveland, Barker pitched the tenth official perfect game in baseball history, defeating the Toronto Blue Jays, 3–0 (the game was originally reported as the ninth perfect game in major league baseball history until the league later changed the criteria for recognizing a perfect game). The final out of the game was a fly ball caught by Rick Manning in short center field. Barker's pitching was so consistent on that night that he never reached ball three against any Blue Jay hitter, and only eight Blue Jays pushed him as far as ball two. They were particularly flummoxed by Barker's curveball.

Barker's perfect outing, one of only twenty four in the history of Major League Baseball, is also the most recent no-hitter thrown by an Indians pitcher. "I run into people almost every day who want to talk about it", Barker said in 2006. "Everyone says, 'You're probably tired of talking about it.' I say, 'No, it's something to be proud of.' It's a special thing."

Barker was selected for the 1981 Major League Baseball All-Star Game, held in Cleveland on August 9. It was the first game played after a lengthy players' strike, and Barker pitched two scoreless innings before 72,086 fans in his home stadium.

=== Later career ===
During the 1983 season, Barker was traded to the Atlanta Braves for Brett Butler, Brook Jacoby, Rick Behenna and $150,000 cash. The trade was initiated by the Braves, who were in a tight race for first in the National League West Division with the Los Angeles Dodgers. Barker pitched reasonably well down the stretch, notching a 3.82 ERA despite only going 1–3 in his six starts after the trade. After the season, the Braves signed Barker to one of the richest contracts for a pitcher in baseball history to that time, $4 million over five years.

Barker did not pitch as well after the new contract was signed. In 1984, he went 7–8 with a 3.85 ERA before missing the last two months of the season with an elbow injury. The next year, Barker's ERA ballooned to 6.35, and he only managed a 2–9 record. He was released at the end of 1986 spring training with three years remaining on his contract. He signed with the Montreal Expos a few weeks later and spent the season with their top affiliate, the Indianapolis Indians. The Expos released him during 1987 spring training, and he finished his career with the Milwaukee Brewers. Meanwhile, Butler and Jacoby went on to become All-Stars.

== Post-playing ==
After his playing career, Barker returned to the Cleveland area and founded a construction company with a business partner. He and his wife Eva are the parents of Jared, Blake, and Jacob. He also has three children, Carly, Troy and Lyle with his previous wife, Bonnie. The Barker family currently resides in Geauga County, east of Cleveland. Barker served as the head coach for Division II Notre Dame College in South Euclid until the school's closure in 2024.

== See also ==
- List of Major League Baseball perfect games
- List of Major League Baseball annual strikeout leaders

Awards and achievements
| Preceded by Catfish Hunter | Perfect game pitcher May 15, 1981 | Succeeded by Mike Witt |
| Preceded by Charlie Lea | No-hitter pitcher May 15, 1981 | Succeeded by Nolan Ryan |
