= 1981 Minnesota Twins season =

1981 Minnesota Twins
- League: American League
- Division: West
- Ballpark: Metropolitan Stadium
- City: Bloomington, Minnesota
- Record: 41–68 (.376)
- Divisional place: 7th
- Owners: Calvin Griffith (majority owner, with Thelma Griffith Haynes)
- General managers: Calvin Griffith
- Managers: Johnny Goryl, Billy Gardner
- Television: KMSP-TV (Bob Kurtz, Larry Osterman)
- Radio: 830 WCCO AM (Herb Carneal, Frank Quilici)

The 1981 Minnesota Twins season was the 21st season for the Minnesota Twins franchise in the Twin Cities of Minnesota, the 81st overall in the American League and the 21st and final season at Metropolitan Stadium, as the team moved to the Metrodome the next season.

The Twins finished with a 41–68 record, seventh in the American League West. In the strike split season, the Twins were 17–39, seventh place in the first half and 24–29, fourth place in the second half. 469,090 fans attended Twins games, the lowest total in the American League. The franchise would not play another outdoor home game until 2010, when Target Field opened.

== Offseason ==
- December 8, 1980: Dave Edwards was traded by the Twins to the San Diego Padres for Chuck Baker.
- December 8, 1980: Jack O'Connor was drafted by the Twins from the Montreal Expos in the rule 5 draft.
- December 12, 1980: Willie Norwood was traded by the Twins to the Seattle Mariners for Byron McLaughlin.
- March 27, 1981: Bombo Rivera was released by the Twins.
- March 30, 1981: Ken Landreaux was traded by the Twins to the Los Angeles Dodgers for Mickey Hatcher, Kelly Snider (minors), and Matt Reeves (minors).

== Regular season ==
Only one Twins player made the All-Star Game: relief pitcher Doug Corbett.

On August 24, first baseman Kent Hrbek made his major league debut, in a Yankee Stadium game. His twelfth-inning home run beat the Yankees 3–2. Later that week, Hrbek was topped by catcher Tim Laudner, who debuted on August 28 and hit home runs in his first two games.

On September 20, Gary Gaetti made his major league debut and started at third base for the Twins. In his first at bat in the second inning, he homered off Texas Rangers pitcher Charlie Hough to become the third Twin to homer in his first-ever at bat. Gaetti joined Rick Renick (1968) and Dave McKay (1975). Later, Andre David (1984) and Eddie Rosario (2015) will join the trio in Twins history.

The Twins played their final game at Metropolitan Stadium on September 30, losing 5–2 to the Kansas City Royals. The club played their last outdoor home game for the next twenty-eight seasons in 56-degree temperature in front of 15,900 fans. "The Met" had been the Twins' home since their Minnesota opener on April 21, 1961 (also a loss). Gary Ward had the final Twins hit in the Met, a single in the ninth inning. Pete Mackanin homered in the second for the final Twins Met Stadium home run.

=== Offense ===
John Castino batted .268 with 6 HR and 36 RBI. Shortstop Roy Smalley had 7 HR and collected 22 RBI.

Team Leaders
Statistic	Player	Quantity
HR	Roy Smalley	7
RBI	Mickey Hatcher	37
BA	John Castino	.268
Runs	Gary Ward	42

=== Pitching ===
Reliever Doug Corbett was the Twins' only bright spot on the mound, racking up 17 saves.

Team Leaders
Statistic	Player	Quantity
ERA	Fernando Arroyo	3.93
Wins	Pete Redfern	9
Saves	Doug Corbett	17
Strikeouts	Pete Redfern	77

=== Season standings ===
AL West
Team	W	L	Pct.	GB	Home	Road
Oakland Athletics	64	45	.587	—	35‍–‍21	29‍–‍24
Texas Rangers	57	48	.543	5	32‍–‍24	25‍–‍24
Chicago White Sox	54	52	.509	8½	25‍–‍24	29‍–‍28
Kansas City Royals	50	53	.485	11	19‍–‍28	31‍–‍25
California Angels	51	59	.464	13½	26‍–‍28	25‍–‍31
Seattle Mariners	44	65	.404	20	20‍–‍37	24‍–‍28
Minnesota Twins	41	68	.376	23	24‍–‍36	17‍–‍32

AL West First Half Standings	W	L	Pct.	GB
Oakland Athletics	37	23	.617	—
Texas Rangers	33	22	.600	1 1/2
Chicago White Sox	31	22	.585	2 1/2
California Angels	31	29	.517	6
Kansas City Royals	20	30	.400	12
Seattle Mariners	21	36	.368	14 1/2
Minnesota Twins	17	39	.304	18

AL West Second Half Standings	W	L	Pct.	GB
Kansas City Royals	30	23	.566	—
Oakland Athletics	27	22	.551	1
Texas Rangers	24	26	.480	4 1/2
Minnesota Twins	24	29	.453	6
Seattle Mariners	23	29	.442	6 1/2
Chicago White Sox	23	30	.434	7
California Angels	20	30	.400	8 1/2

=== Record vs. opponents ===
1981 American League record Sources:
Team	BAL	BOS	CAL	CWS	CLE	DET	KC	MIL	MIN	NYY	OAK	SEA	TEX	TOR
Baltimore	—	2–2	6–6	3–6	4–2	6–7	5–3	2–4	6–0	7–6	7–5	4–2	2–1	5–2
Boston	2–2	—	2–4	5–4	7–6	6–1	3–3	6–7	2–5	3–3	7–5	9–3	3–6	4–0
California	6–6	4–2	—	6–7	7–5	3–3	0–6	4–3	3–3	2–2	2–8	6–4	2–4	6–6
Chicago	6–3	4–5	7–6	—	2–5	3–3	2–0	4–1	2–4	5–7	7–6	3–3	2–4	7–5
Cleveland	2–4	6–7	5–7	5–2	—	1–5	4–4	3–6	2–1	7–5	3–2	8–4	2–2	4–2
Detroit	7–6	1–6	3–3	3–3	5–1	—	3–2	5–8	9–3	3–7	1–2	5–1	9–3	6–4
Kansas City	3–5	3–3	6–0	0–2	4–4	2–3	—	4–5	9–4	2–10	3–3	6–7	3–4	5–3
Milwaukee	4–2	7–6	3–4	1–4	6–3	8–5	5–4	—	9–3	3–3	4–2	2–2	4–5	6–4
Minnesota	0–6	5–2	3–3	4–2	1–2	3–9	4–9	3–9	—	3–3	2–8	3–6–1	5–8	5–1
New York	6–7	3–3	2–2	7–5	5–7	7–3	10–2	3–3	3–3	—	4–3	2–3	5–4	2–3
Oakland	5–7	5–7	8–2	6–7	2–3	2–1	3–3	2–4	8–2	3–4	—	6–1	4–2	10–2
Seattle	2–4	3–9	4–6	3–3	4–8	1–5	7–6	2–2	6–3–1	3–2	1–6	—	5–8	3–3
Texas	1–2	6–3	4–2	4–2	2–2	3–9	4–3	5–4	8–5	4–5	2–4	8–5	—	6–2
Toronto	2–5	0–4	6–6	5–7	2–4	4–6	3–5	4–6	1–5	3–2	2–10	3–3	2–6	—

=== Notable transactions ===
- June 8, 1981: Frank Viola was drafted by the Twins in the 2nd round of the 1981 Major League Baseball draft.
- August 23, 1981: Ron Jackson was traded by the Twins to the Detroit Tigers for a player to be named later. The Tigers completed the deal by sending Tim Corcoran to the Twins on September 4.
- August 30, 1981: Jerry Koosman was traded by the Twins to the Chicago White Sox for Ivan Mesa (minors), Ronnie Perry (minors), a player to be named later, and cash. The White Sox completed the trade by sending Randy Johnson to the Twins on September 2.

=== Roster ===
1981 Minnesota Twins
Roster
Pitchers: 30 Fernando Arroyo; 34 Don Cooper; 23 Doug Corbett; 19 Roger Erickson; 21 Terry Felton; 39,27 Brad Havens; 40 John Hobbs; 15,31 Darrell Jackson; 36 Jerry Koosman; 33 Jack O'Connor; 17 Pete Redfern; 22 John Verhoeven; 35 Bob Veselic; 28 Albert Williams	Catchers: 11 Sal Butera; 15 Tim Laudner; 18 Ray Smith; 16 Butch Wynegar; Infielders: 24 Chuck Baker; 2 John Castino; 1 Tim Corcoran; 12,21 Lenny Faedo; 39 Gary Gaetti; 25 Danny Goodwin; 26 Kent Hrbek; 15 Ron Jackson; 14 Pete Mackanin; 5 Roy Smalley; 38 Ron Washington; 7 Rob Wilfong	Outfielders: 51,20 Dave Engle; 4 Mark Funderburk; 44,9 Mickey Hatcher; 21 Greg Johnston; 10 Hosken Powell; 12 Rick Sofield; 32 Gary Ward; Other batters: 8 Glenn Adams	Manager: 42 Billy Gardner; 45 Johnny Goryl; Coaches: 42 Billy Gardner (First Base); 41 Karl Kuehl (Third Base); 44 Jim Lemon (Bullpen Catcher); 46 Johnny Podres (Pitching); 43 Rick Stelmaszek (Bullpen)

== Player stats ==
= Indicates team leader

=== Batting ===
==== Starters by position ====
Note: Pos = Position; G = Games played; AB = At bats; H = Hits; Avg. = Batting average; HR = Home runs; RBI = Runs batted in

Pos	Player	G	AB	H	Avg.	HR	RBI
C	Sal Butera	62	167	40	.240	0	18
1B	Danny Goodwin	59	151	34	.225	2	17
2B	Rob Wilfong	93	305	75	.246	3	19
3B	John Castino	101	381	102	.268	6	36
SS	Roy Smalley	56	167	44	.263	7	22
LF	Gary Ward	85	295	78	.264	3	29
CF	Mickey Hatcher	99	377	96	.255	3	37
RF	Dave Engle	82	248	64	.258	5	32
DH	Glenn Adams	72	220	46	.209	2	24

==== Other batters ====
Note: G = Games played; AB = At bats; H = Hits; Avg. = Batting average; HR = Home runs; RBI = Runs batted in

Player	G	AB	H	Avg.	HR	RBI
Hosken Powell	80	264	63	.239	2	25
Pete Mackanin	77	225	52	.231	4	18
Ron Jackson	54	175	46	.263	4	28
Butch Wynegar	47	150	37	.247	0	10
Rick Sofield	41	102	18	.176	0	5
Ron Washington	28	84	19	.226	0	5
Kent Hrbek	24	67	16	.239	1	7
Chuck Baker	40	66	12	.182	0	6
Tim Corcoran	22	51	9	.176	0	4
Tim Laudner	14	43	7	.163	2	5
Lenny Faedo	12	41	8	.195	0	6
Ray Smith	15	40	8	.200	1	1
Gary Gaetti	9	26	5	.192	2	3
Greg Johnston	7	16	2	.125	0	0
Mark Funderburk	8	15	3	.200	0	2

=== Pitching ===
= Indicates league leader

==== Starting pitchers ====
Note: G = Games pitched; IP = Innings pitched; W = Wins; L = Losses; ERA = Earned run average; SO = Strikeouts

Player	G	IP	W	L	ERA	SO
Albert Williams	23	150.0	6	10	4.08	76
Pete Redfern	24	141.2	9	8	4.07	77
Fernando Arroyo	23	128.1	7	10	3.93	39
Jerry Koosman	19	94.1	3	9	4.20	55
Roger Erickson	14	91.1	3	8	3.84	44
Brad Havens	14	78.0	3	6	3.58	43

==== Other pitchers ====
Note: G = Games pitched; IP = Innings pitched; W = Wins; L = Losses; ERA = Earned run average; SO = Strikeouts

Player	G	IP	W	L	ERA	SO
Darrell Jackson	14	32.2	3	3	4.41	26

==== Relief pitchers ====
Note: G = Games pitched; W = Wins; L = Losses; SV = Saves; ERA = Earned run average; SO = Strikeouts

Player	G	W	L	SV	ERA	SO
Doug Corbett	54	2	6	17	2.57	60
Jack O'Connor	28	3	2	0	5.86	16
Don Cooper	27	1	5	0	4.30	33
John Verhoeven	25	0	0	0	3.98	16
Bob Veselic	5	1	1	0	3.18	13
John Hobbs	4	0	0	0	3.18	1
Terry Felton	1	0	0	0	40.50	1

== Farm system ==
Level	Team	League	Manager
AAA	Toledo Mud Hens	International League	Cal Ermer
AA	Orlando Twins	Southern League	Tom Kelly
A	Visalia Oaks	California League	Dick Phillips
A	Wisconsin Rapids Twins	Midwest League	Ken Staples
Rookie	Elizabethton Twins	Appalachian League	Fred Waters

LEAGUE CHAMPIONS: Orlando
