= 1981 Seattle Mariners season =

1981 Seattle Mariners
- League: American League
- Division: West
- Ballpark: Kingdome
- City: Seattle, Washington
- Owner: George Argyros
- General manager: Dan O'Brien Sr.
- Managers: Maury Wills - (6–18); Rene Lachemann - (38–47)
- Television: KING-TV
- Radio: KVI 570 AM (Dave Niehaus, Ken Wilson, Don Poier)

The 1981 Seattle Mariners season was their fifth since the franchise creation, and were sixth in the American League West at 44–65 (.404). Due to the 1981 player's strike, the season was split in half, with pre-strike and post-strike results. The Mariners were sixth in the division in the first half at 21–36 (.368), and fifth in the second half at 23–29 (.442). The strike began on June 12 and regular season play resumed on August 10.

Manager Maury Wills was fired on May 6 with a 6–18 (.250) record, the M's worst start yet; he was succeeded by 36-year-old Rene Lachemann, the manager at Triple-A Spokane.

== Offseason ==
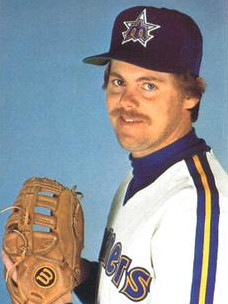
Ken Clay was traded to the Mariners during the off-season

- November 18, 1980: Brad Gulden was traded by the New York Yankees with $150,000 to the Mariners for a player to be named later and Larry Milbourne; the Mariners sent back Gulden to the Yankees on May 18, 1981 to complete the trade. In effect, Gulden was traded for himself.
- December 8: Gary Gray was selected by the Mariners from the Cleveland Indians in the Rule 5 draft.
- December 12: Byron McLaughlin was traded by the Mariners to the Minnesota Twins for Willie Norwood.
- December 12: Willie Horton, Larry Cox, Rick Honeycutt, Mario Mendoza, and Leon Roberts were traded by the Mariners to the Texas Rangers for Richie Zisk, Rick Auerbach, Ken Clay, Jerry Don Gleaton, Brian Allard, and Steve Finch.
- March 7, 1981: Traded Carlos Diaz to the Atlanta Braves for Jeff Burroughs.
- March 26: Norwood and Dave Heaverlo were released.

== Regular season ==
=== Season standings ===
AL West
Team	W	L	Pct.	GB	Home	Road
Oakland Athletics	64	45	.587	—	35‍–‍21	29‍–‍24
Texas Rangers	57	48	.543	5	32‍–‍24	25‍–‍24
Chicago White Sox	54	52	.509	8½	25‍–‍24	29‍–‍28
Kansas City Royals	50	53	.485	11	19‍–‍28	31‍–‍25
California Angels	51	59	.464	13½	26‍–‍28	25‍–‍31
Seattle Mariners	44	65	.404	20	20‍–‍37	24‍–‍28
Minnesota Twins	41	68	.376	23	24‍–‍36	17‍–‍32

AL West First Half Standings	W	L	Pct.	GB
Oakland Athletics	37	23	.617	—
Texas Rangers	33	22	.600	1 1/2
Chicago White Sox	31	22	.585	2 1/2
California Angels	31	29	.517	6
Kansas City Royals	20	30	.400	12
Seattle Mariners	21	36	.368	14 1/2
Minnesota Twins	17	39	.304	18

AL West Second Half Standings	W	L	Pct.	GB
Kansas City Royals	30	23	.566	—
Oakland Athletics	27	22	.551	1
Texas Rangers	24	26	.480	4 1/2
Minnesota Twins	24	29	.453	6
Seattle Mariners	23	29	.442	6 1/2
Chicago White Sox	23	30	.434	7
California Angels	20	30	.400	8 1/2

==== Record vs. opponents ====
1981 American League record Sources:
Team	BAL	BOS	CAL	CWS	CLE	DET	KC	MIL	MIN	NYY	OAK	SEA	TEX	TOR
Baltimore	—	2–2	6–6	3–6	4–2	6–7	5–3	2–4	6–0	7–6	7–5	4–2	2–1	5–2
Boston	2–2	—	2–4	5–4	7–6	6–1	3–3	6–7	2–5	3–3	7–5	9–3	3–6	4–0
California	6–6	4–2	—	6–7	7–5	3–3	0–6	4–3	3–3	2–2	2–8	6–4	2–4	6–6
Chicago	6–3	4–5	7–6	—	2–5	3–3	2–0	4–1	2–4	5–7	7–6	3–3	2–4	7–5
Cleveland	2–4	6–7	5–7	5–2	—	1–5	4–4	3–6	2–1	7–5	3–2	8–4	2–2	4–2
Detroit	7–6	1–6	3–3	3–3	5–1	—	3–2	5–8	9–3	3–7	1–2	5–1	9–3	6–4
Kansas City	3–5	3–3	6–0	0–2	4–4	2–3	—	4–5	9–4	2–10	3–3	6–7	3–4	5–3
Milwaukee	4–2	7–6	3–4	1–4	6–3	8–5	5–4	—	9–3	3–3	4–2	2–2	4–5	6–4
Minnesota	0–6	5–2	3–3	4–2	1–2	3–9	4–9	3–9	—	3–3	2–8	3–6–1	5–8	5–1
New York	6–7	3–3	2–2	7–5	5–7	7–3	10–2	3–3	3–3	—	4–3	2–3	5–4	2–3
Oakland	5–7	5–7	8–2	6–7	2–3	2–1	3–3	2–4	8–2	3–4	—	6–1	4–2	10–2
Seattle	2–4	3–9	4–6	3–3	4–8	1–5	7–6	2–2	6–3–1	3–2	1–6	—	5–8	3–3
Texas	1–2	6–3	4–2	4–2	2–2	3–9	4–3	5–4	8–5	4–5	2–4	8–5	—	6–2
Toronto	2–5	0–4	6–6	5–7	2–4	4–6	3–5	4–6	1–5	3–2	2–10	3–3	2–6	—

=== Season summary ===
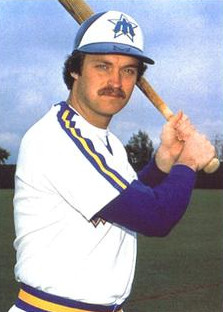
Jerry Narron caught 65 games for the Mariners.

On January 14, 1981, the Mariners' were sold to George Argyros, a California real estate developer, for an estimated $12.5 million. The sale of the team, which needed the approval of 10 of 14 owners of American League teams, received a unanimous vote of consent on January 29.

On April 25, Mariners' manager Maury Wills advised the Kingdome groundskeepers to enlarge the batter's box by a foot (0.3 m), and A's manager Billy Martin noticed. He showed umpire Bill Kunkel that the batter's box was seven feet (2.1 m) in length (instead of six). Martin felt that batters being able to move up a foot in the box could cut at pitches before a curveball broke. Wills was suspended for two games and fined $500; he was fired on May 6.

While in Arlington in late May to play the Texas Rangers, the Mariners' uniforms were stolen. For the May 30 game against the Rangers, Seattle wore their batting practice jerseys, Milwaukee Brewers' caps, and Rangers' batting helmets. The Mariners purchased the Brewers caps at the Rangers' souvenir-stand; the Rangers did not offer Seattle caps for sale.

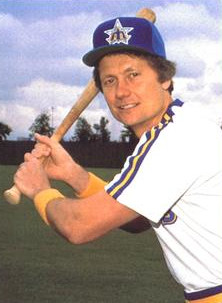
Tom Paciorek hit .326 and then was traded after the season

Journeyman Tom Paciorek put together a career season with the M's in 1981. Playing full-time for the only time in his career at age 34, he batted .326, second in the American League, and was fourth in the AL in slugging percentage. Paciorek earned his only appearance to an All-Star team and was tenth in the AL MVP race. After a request for increased compensation and a three-year contract, the Mariners traded him in December 1981 to the Chicago White Sox for three players, Rod Allen, Todd Cruz, and Jim Essian, none of whom made an impact with Seattle. Paciorek hit over .300 his first two years with the Sox and was part of Chicago's division championship team in 1983.

Seattle drafted three future All-Stars in the 1981 MLB draft, selecting Mike Moore with the first overall pick, as well as Mark Langston and Phil Bradley.

==== Notable transactions ====
- April 6, 1981: Lenny Randle signed as a free agent.
- April 8: Manny Sarmiento was traded by the Mariners to the Boston Red Sox for Dick Drago.
- April 8: Bob Galasso signed as a free agent with the Mariners.
- June 8: 1981 Major League Baseball draft:
  - Mike Moore was selected with the first overall pick in the first round. He received a $100,000 signing bonus.
  - Mark Langston was selected in the second round.
  - Phil Bradley was selected in the third round.
  - Lee Guetterman was selected in the fourth round.
  - Charlie O'Brien was selected in the 21st round but did not sign.

== 1981 roster ==
1981 Seattle Mariners roster
Roster
Pitchers: 17 Glenn Abbott; 31 Brian Allard; 39 Larry Andersen; 19 Floyd Bannister; 45 Jim Beattie; 36 Bud Black; 48 Bryan Clark; 21 Ken Clay; 40 Dick Drago; 43 Bob Galasso; 28 Jerry Don Gleaton; 20 Mike Parrott; 41 Shane Rawley; 26 Randy Stein; 34 Bob Stoddard	Catchers: 9 Bud Bulling; 44 Dan Firova; 27 Brad Gulden; 3 Jerry Narron; Infielders: 2 Kim Allen; 4 Jim Anderson; 16 Rick Auerbach; 23 Bruce Bochte; 6 Julio Cruz; 24 Dave Edler; 29 Gary Gray; 11 Jim Maler; 8 Vance McHenry; 7 Dan Meyer; 1 Lenny Randle; 38 Paul Serna	Outfielders: 5 Jeff Burroughs; 42 Dave Henderson; 14 Tom Paciorek; 27 Casey Parsons; 18 Joe Simpson; 33 Reggie Walton	Manager: 15 Rene Lachemann; 30 Maury Wills; Coaches: 12 Tommy Davis (Hitting); 35 Frank Funk (Pitching); 10 Cananea Reyes (First Base); 32 Wes Stock (Pitching)

=== Player stats ===
= Indicates team leader

==== Batting ====
===== Starters by position =====
Note: Pos = Position; G = Games played; AB = At bats; H = Hits; Avg. = Batting average; HR = Home runs; RBI = Runs batted in

Pos	Player	G	AB	H	Avg.	HR	RBI
C	Jerry Narron	76	203	45	.222	3	17
1B	Bruce Bochte	99	335	87	.260	6	30
2B	Julio Cruz	94	352	90	.256	2	24
SS	Jim Anderson	70	162	33	.204	2	19
3B	Dan Meyer	83	252	66	.262	3	22
LF	Tom Paciorek	104	405	132	.326	14	66
CF	Joe Simpson	91	288	64	.222	2	30
RF	Jeff Burroughs	89	319	81	.254	10	41
DH	Richie Zisk	94	357	111	.311	16	43

===== Other batters =====
Note: G = Games played; AB = At bats; H = Hits; Avg. = Batting average; HR = Home runs; RBI = Runs batted in

Player	G	AB	H	Avg.	HR	RBI
Lenny Randle	82	273	63	.231	4	25
Gary Gray	69	208	51	.245	13	31
Bud Bulling	62	154	38	.247	2	15
Dave Henderson	59	126	21	.167	6	13
Paul Serna	30	94	24	.255	4	9
Rick Auerbach	38	84	13	.155	1	6
Dave Edler	29	78	11	.141	0	5
Jim Maler	12	23	8	.348	0	2
Casey Parsons	36	22	5	.227	1	5
Vance McHenry	15	18	4	.222	0	2
Brad Gulden	8	16	3	.188	0	1
Reggie Walton	12	6	0	.000	0	0
Kim Allen	19	3	0	.000	0	0
Dan Firova	13	2	0	.000	0	0

==== Pitching ====
===== Starting pitchers =====
Note: G = Games pitched; IP = Innings pitched; W = Wins; L = Losses; ERA = Earned run average; SO = Strikeouts

Player	G	IP	W	L	ERA	SO
Glenn Abbott	22	130.1	4	9	3.94	35
Floyd Bannister	21	121.1	9	9	4.45	85
Jim Beattie	13	66.2	3	2	2.97	36
Brian Allard	7	48	3	2	3.75	20
Bob Stoddard	5	34.2	2	1	2.60	22

===== Other pitchers =====
Note: G = Games pitched; IP = Innings pitched; W = Wins; L = Losses; ERA = Earned run average; SO = Strikeouts

Player	G	IP	W	L	ERA	SO
Ken Clay	22	101	2	7	4.63	32
Bryan Clark	29	93.1	2	5	4.34	52
Jerry Don Gleaton	20	85.1	4	7	4.75	31
Mike Parrott	24	85.0	3	6	5.08	43

===== Relief pitchers =====
Note: G = Games pitched; W = Wins; L = Losses; SV = Saves; ERA = Earned run average; SO = Strikeouts

Player	G	W	L	SV	ERA	SO
Shane Rawley	46	4	6	8	3.95	35
Larry Andersen	41	3	3	5	2.66	40
Dick Drago	39	4	6	5	5.53	27
Bob Galasso	13	1	1	1	4.83	14
Randy Stein	6	0	1	0	10.61	6
Bud Black	2	0	0	0	0.00	0

== Awards and records ==
- Julio Cruz set an American League (AL) record and tied an MLB record with 18 fielding chances without an error in a nine-inning game on June 7
- Designated hitter Richie Zisk won the Sporting News AL Comeback Player of the Year Award.

== Farm system ==
Level	Team	League	Manager
AAA	Spokane Indians	Pacific Coast League	Rene Lachemann and Ken Pape
AA	Lynn Sailors	Eastern League	Bobby Floyd
A	Wausau Timbers	Midwest League	Bill Plummer
A-Short Season	Bellingham Mariners	Northwest League	Jeff Scott

League champions: Wausau
