= Gil Kubski =

American baseball player (born 1954)

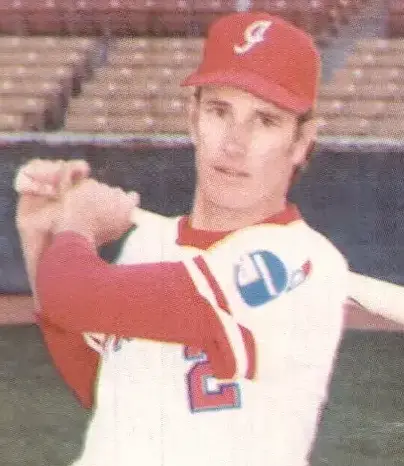
- Kubski with the Indianapolis Indians c. 1982
- Outfielder
- Born: October 12, 1954 (age 71); Longview, Texas, U.S.
- Batted: Left Threw: Right

MLB debut
- September 2, 1980, for the California Angels

Last MLB appearance
- October 5, 1980, for the California Angels

MLB statistics
- Batting average: .254
- Home runs: 0
- Runs batted in: 6
- Stats at Baseball Reference

Teams
- California Angels (1980)

Gilbert Thomas Kubski (born October 12, 1954) is an American former professional baseball player who appeared in 22 games as an outfielder in Major League Baseball (MLB) for the 1980 California Angels.

== Career ==
The son of Al Kubski, a former minor league player and manager and longtime MLB scout, Gil was born in Longview, Texas, graduated from high school in Granada Hills, California, and was selected by the Angels in the first round of the 1975 January Major League Baseball draft after playing at California State University, Northridge. He threw right-handed, batted left-handed, and was listed as 6 feet 3 inches (1.91 m) tall and 185 pounds (84 kg).

Kubski's playing career lasted for eight pro seasons, with his 22-game MLB trial occurring during his sixth season in organized baseball in 1980. He started 15 games and appeared as a defensive replacement or pinch hitter in seven more. His 16 MLB hits included three doubles. He retired as an active player in 1982 after 859 games in pro ball.

He has remained in baseball, however, as a scout for the Chicago Cubs, San Francisco Giants, Baltimore Orioles, the Major League Baseball Scouting Bureau and the Arizona Diamondbacks.
