= Jackson Todd =

American baseball player (born 1951)

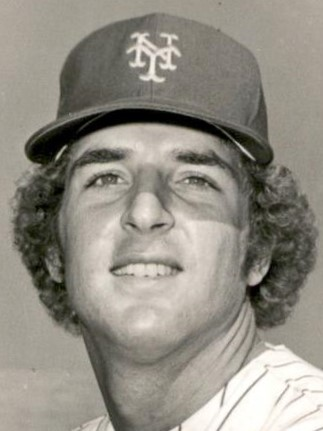
- Pitcher
- Born: November 20, 1951 (age 73); Tulsa, Oklahoma, U.S.
- Batted: Right Threw: Right

MLB debut
- May 5, 1977, for the New York Mets

Last MLB appearance
- October 4, 1981, for the Toronto Blue Jays

MLB statistics
- Win–loss record: 10–16
- Earned run average: 4.40
- Strikeouts: 138
- Stats at Baseball Reference

Teams
- New York Mets (1977); Toronto Blue Jays (1979–1981)
Medals
Men's baseball
Representing United States
Pan American Games
Silver medal – second place	1971 Cali	Team

Jackson A. Todd (born November 20, 1951) is a former Major League Baseball pitcher. He represented the United States at the 1971 Pan American Games, where he won a silver medal.

== College career ==
Todd was originally drafted by the Chicago Cubs in the eleventh round of the 1970 Major League Baseball draft out of Will Rogers High School, but did not sign with the team. Instead, he opted to play college baseball at the University of Oklahoma. During his time as a member of the Oklahoma Sooners baseball team of the now defunct Big Eight Conference, he was named to the All-Conference second team as a freshman (1971), and the All-Conference first team his sophomore and junior years. In 1972 & 1973, Todd was also a third team All-American. Todd pitched thirteen complete games during the 1973 season, a university record which still stands today. During the 1972 College World Series, Todd pitched fourteen innings in two games without allowing an earned run. After three seasons at Oklahoma, Todd was selected in the second round of the 1973 Major League Baseball draft by the New York Mets, and decided to forgo a senior season at Oklahoma.

== New York Mets ==
After two seasons in the Mets' farm system, Todd was diagnosed with cancer. The tumor and lymph nodes were removed from his lower stomach, followed by chemotherapy, which caused him to lose his hair, and his weight dropped from 195 lbs. to 168. Against all odds, Todd recovered in time to join the double A Jackson Mets midway through the 1975 season, and went 3–4 with a 3.17 earned run average.

In 1976, Todd played for the Tidewater Tides of the International League and pitched in 26 games, going 13–9 with a 2.91 ERA. He played part of the 1977 season in Tidewater, and made his major league debut on May 5, 1977 against the Los Angeles Dodgers, pitching an inning of relief for Tom Seaver and allowing one hit and no runs. He earned his first win in his first start on May 19 against the San Francisco Giants. With two outs in the eighth inning, Todd lost a shutout (it would have been his only career shutout). He also collected his only career hit in seventeen career at bats against Ed Halicki. For the season, he went 3–6 with a 4.77 ERA in nineteen appearances, ten starts.

== Toronto Blue Jays ==
During Spring training 1978, Todd was traded to the Philadelphia Phillies for minor league infielder Ed Cuervo. He spent the season playing for his home town minor league team, Oklahoma City 89ers, where he went 3–4 with a 4.61 ERA. He was released by the Phillies at the start of the 1979 season, and signed on with the Toronto Blue Jays shortly afterward.

Todd spent the first half of the 1979 season with the Syracuse Chiefs, where he went 9–4 with a 3.34 ERA. An injury to starting pitcher Jim Clancy opened a door for Todd to receive a call to the majors in August. Despite getting hit hard by the Kansas City Royals in his first appearance, he made his only start of the season five days later in the first game of a doubleheader with the Chicago White Sox. He allowed five earned runs in seven plus innings to take the loss. From there, Todd was relegated to "mop up duty," making ten more appearances, all in losses.

Todd's 1980 season mirrored his 1979 season in that he began the season in Syracuse, and joined the Blue Jays in August, but the similarities end there. He was immediately inserted into the starting rotation. He ended up with a no decision in both of his first two starts, despite handing the game over to the bullpen with a lead in both cases. In his third start, he earned a complete game victory over the Minnesota Twins. For the season, he made twelve starts, and went 5–2 with a career best 3.96 ERA. Despite this moderate success, he was demoted to Syracuse, where he spent the 1982 season.

== Career stats ==
Seasons	W	L	PCT	ERA	G	GS	CG	SHO	SV	IP	BF	H	ER	R	HR	BAA	K	BB	BB/9	WP	HBP	Fld%
4	10	16	.385	4.40	64	36	7	0	0	286.2	1232	302	140	158	39	.270	138	88	2.8	11	9	.952

Todd played for the Houston Astros' Pacific Coast League affiliate, the Tucson Toros in 1983. After taking the 1984 season off, he split the 1985 season between the Chicago White Sox's and Baltimore Orioles' farm system, but did not see any more major league action. Shortly afterwards, Todd had started his coaching career, as pitching coach with the triple A Denver Zephyrs. In 1991, he moved over to the Texas Rangers organization. After a year with the Class A Gastonia Rangers, he went up to the double A Tulsa Drillers in 1992. After also spending time with the Milwaukee Brewers and San Diego Padres organizations, Todd went back to the University of Oklahoma in 1996 as their pitching coach.
