= John Lickert =

American baseball player (born 1960)

- Catcher
- Born: April 4, 1960 (age 66); Pittsburgh, Pennsylvania, U.S.
- Batted: Right Threw: Right

MLB debut
- September 19, 1981, for the Boston Red Sox

Last MLB appearance
- September 19, 1981, for the Boston Red Sox

MLB statistics
- Games played: 1
- Stats at Baseball Reference

Teams
- Boston Red Sox (1981)

John Wilbur Lickert (born April 4, 1960) is an American former catcher in Major League Baseball. He played one game with the Boston Red Sox in 1981, and was credited with one putout and no official at bats.

== Sources ==
- Career statistics from Baseball Reference · Baseball Reference (Minors) · Retrosheet · Baseball Almanac
