= Dan Whitmer =

American baseball player (born 1955)

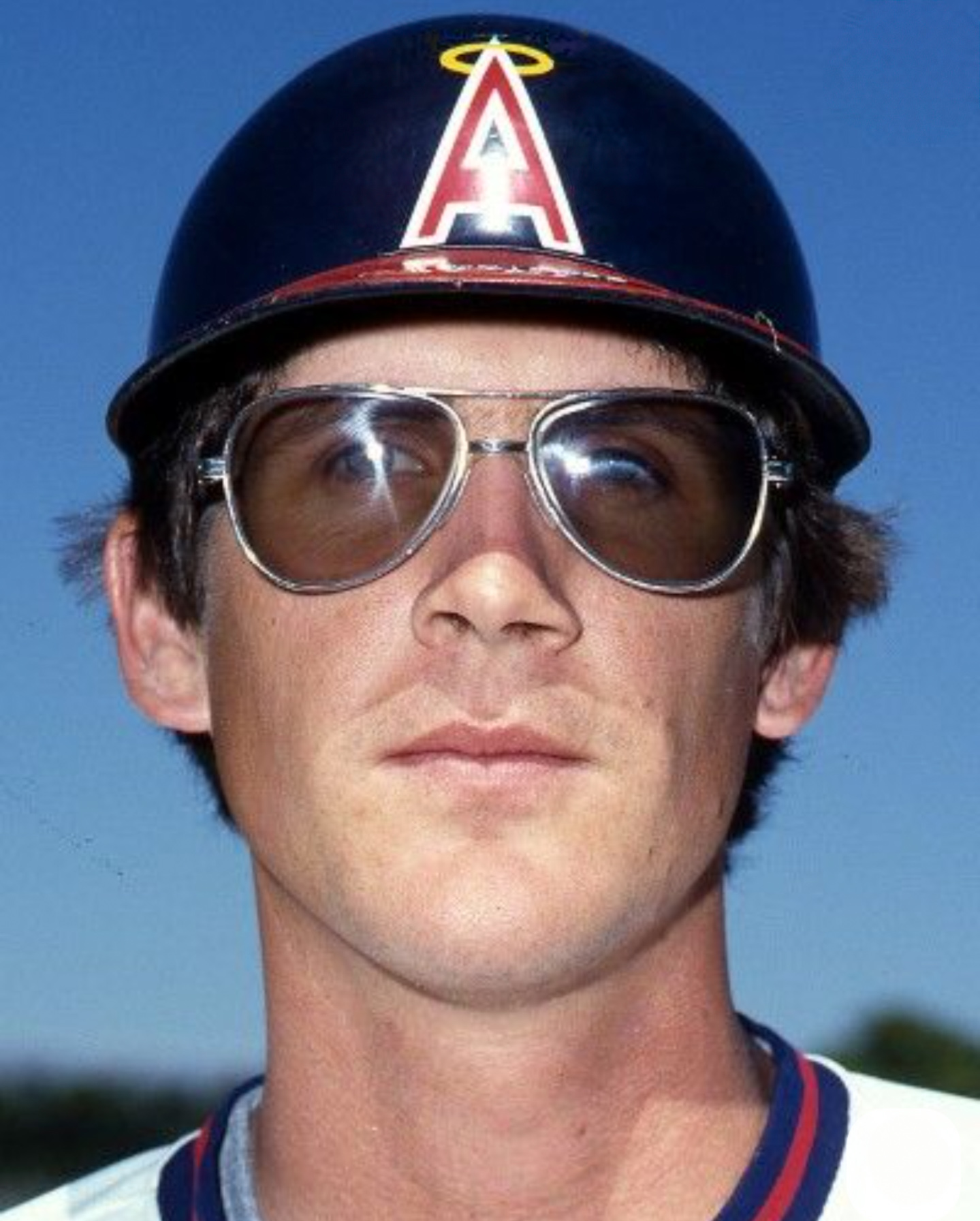
- Whitmer in 1980
- Catcher
- Born: November 23, 1955 (age 70); Redlands, California, U.S.
- Batted: Right Threw: Right

MLB debut
- July 20, 1980, for the California Angels

Last MLB appearance
- May 10, 1981, for the Toronto Blue Jays

MLB statistics
- Batting average: .229
- Home runs: 0
- Runs batted in: 7
- Stats at Baseball Reference

Teams
- California Angels (1980); Toronto Blue Jays (1981)

Daniel Charles Whitmer (born November 23, 1955) is a baseball coach and former professional baseball player. He played parts of two seasons in Major League Baseball, 1980 for the California Angels and 1981 for the Toronto Blue Jays, primarily as a catcher.

After his baseball playing career, Whitmer worked in the Detroit Tigers organization. After starting the 1984 season playing for the Tigers' Double-A farm team, the Birmingham Barons, he was named the bullpen catcher for the eventual 1984 World Series champions on June 15. He was also the team's bullpen coach from 1992 to 1994.

== Sources ==
- Career statistics from Baseball Reference · Baseball Reference (Minors) · Retrosheet · Baseball Almanac
