= Jim Dorsey =

American baseball player (born 1955)

- Starting pitcher
- Born: August 2, 1955 (age 71); Oak Park, Illinois, U.S.
- Batted: Right Threw: Right

MLB debut
- September 2, 1980, for the California Angels

Last MLB appearance
- July 7, 1985, for the Boston Red Sox

MLB statistics
- Win–loss record: 1–3
- Earned run average: 11.79
- Strikeouts: 14
- Stats at Baseball Reference

Teams
- California Angels (1980); Boston Red Sox (1984–1985)

James Edward Dorsey (born August 2, 1955) is an American former professional baseball player who played three seasons for the California Angels and Boston Red Sox of Major League Baseball.
