= 1954 in baseball =

The following are the baseball events of the year 1954 throughout the world.

== Champions ==
=== Major League Baseball ===
- World Series: New York Giants over Cleveland Indians (4–0)
- All-Star Game, July 13 at Cleveland Stadium: American League, 11–9

=== Other champions ===
- All-American Girls Professional Baseball League: Kalamazoo Lassies
- College World Series: Missouri
- Japan Series: Chunichi Dragons over Nishitetsu Lions (4–3)
- Little League World Series: National, Schenectady, New York

Winter Leagues

- 1954 Caribbean Series: Criollos de Caguas
- Cuban League: Alacranes del Almendares
- Dominican Republic League: Estrellas Orientales
- Mexican Pacific League: Venados de Mazatlán
- Panamanian League: Carta Vieja Yankees
- Puerto Rican League: Criollos de Caguas
- Venezuelan League: Pastora de Occidente

== Awards and honors ==
- Baseball Hall of Fame
  - Rabbit Maranville
  - Bill Dickey
  - Bill Terry
- MLB Most Valuable Player Award
  - Willie Mays (NYG, National)
  - Yogi Berra (NYY, American)
- MLB Rookie of the Year Award
  - Wally Moon (STL, National)
  - Bob Grim (NYY, American)
- The Sporting News Player of the Year Award
  - Willie Mays (NYG)
- The Sporting News Pitcher of the Year Award
  - Johnny Antonelli (NYG, National)
  - Bob Lemon (CLE, American)
- The Sporting News Rookie of the Year Award
  - Wally Moon (STL, National)
  - Bob Grim (NYY, American)
- The Sporting News Manager of the Year Award
  - Leo Durocher (NYG)

== Statistical leaders ==
	American League		National League	
Stat	Player	Total	Player	Total
AVG	Bobby Ávila (CLE)	.341	Willie Mays (NYG)	.345
HR	Larry Doby (CLE)	32	Ted Kluszewski (CIN)	49
RBI	Larry Doby (CLE)	126	Ted Kluszewski (CIN)	141
W	Bob Lemon (CLE); Early Wynn (CLE)	23	Robin Roberts (PHI)	23
ERA	Mike Garcia (CLE)	2.64	Johnny Antonelli (NYG)	2.30
K	Bob Turley (BAL)	185	Robin Roberts (PHI)	185

== Major league baseball final standings ==
=== American League final standings ===
American League
Team	W	L	Pct.	GB	Home	Road
Cleveland Indians	111	43	.721	—	59‍–‍18	52‍–‍25
New York Yankees	103	51	.669	8	54‍–‍23	49‍–‍28
Chicago White Sox	94	60	.610	17	45‍–‍32	49‍–‍28
Boston Red Sox	69	85	.448	42	38‍–‍39	31‍–‍46
Detroit Tigers	68	86	.442	43	35‍–‍42	33‍–‍44
Washington Senators	66	88	.429	45	37‍–‍41	29‍–‍47
Baltimore Orioles	54	100	.351	57	32‍–‍45	22‍–‍55
Philadelphia Athletics	51	103	.331	60	29‍–‍47	22‍–‍56

Locations of teams for the 1954 American League season
American League

=== National League final standings ===
National League
Team	W	L	Pct.	GB	Home	Road
New York Giants	97	57	.630	—	53‍–‍23	44‍–‍34
Brooklyn Dodgers	92	62	.597	5	45‍–‍32	47‍–‍30
Milwaukee Braves	89	65	.578	8	43‍–‍34	46‍–‍31
Philadelphia Phillies	75	79	.487	22	39‍–‍39	36‍–‍40
Cincinnati Redlegs	74	80	.481	23	41‍–‍36	33‍–‍44
St. Louis Cardinals	72	82	.468	25	33‍–‍44	39‍–‍38
Chicago Cubs	64	90	.416	33	40‍–‍37	24‍–‍53
Pittsburgh Pirates	53	101	.344	44	31‍–‍46	22‍–‍55

Locations of teams for the 1953–1957 National League seasons
National League

== All-American Girls Professional Baseball League final standings ==
Rank	Team	W	L	Pct.	GB
1	Fort Wayne Daisies	54	40	.574	—
2	South Bend Blue Sox	48	44	.522	5
3	Grand Rapids Chicks	46	45	.505	6½
4	Kalamazoo Lassies	48	48	.500	7
5	Rockford Peaches	37	55	.402	16

== Nippon Professional Baseball final standings ==
=== Central League final standings ===
Central League	G	W	L	T	Pct.	GB
Chunichi Dragons	130	86	40	4	.683	—
Yomiuri Giants	130	82	47	1	.636	5.5
Osaka Tigers	130	71	57	2	.555	16.0
Hiroshima Carp	130	56	69	5	.448	29.5
Kokutetsu Swallows	130	55	73	2	.430	32.0
Yosho Robins	130	32	96	2	.250	55.0

=== Pacific League final standings ===
Pacific League	G	W	L	T	Pct.	GB
Nishitetsu Lions	140	90	47	3	.657	—
Nankai Hawks	140	91	49	0	.650	0.5
Mainichi Orions	140	79	57	4	.581	10.5
Kintetsu Pearls	140	74	63	3	.540	16.0
Hankyu Braves	140	66	70	4	.485	23.5
Takahashi Unions	140	53	84	3	.387	37.0
Toei Flyers	140	52	86	2	.377	38.5
Daiei Stars	140	43	92	5	.319	46.0

== Events ==
=== January ===
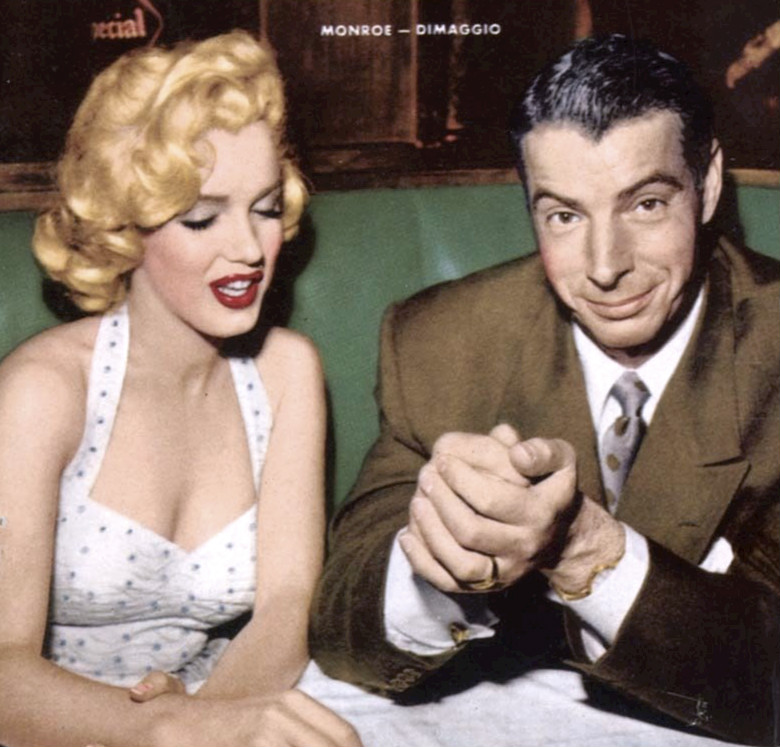
Marilyn Monroe and Joe DiMaggio in 1954

- January 12 – The International League makes two franchise shifts, as the Triple-A Baltimore Orioles team is transferred 150 miles (240 km) south to become the Richmond Virginians, while the Springfield Cubs move to Cuba's capital, becoming the Havana Sugar Kings. The Springfield/Havana franchise is the successor of the Newark Bears, who played from 1912–1919 and 1921–1949 in the International circuit.
- January 13 – The Philadelphia Phillies acquire veteran right-handed pitcher Murry Dickson from the Pittsburgh Pirates for pitcher Andy Hansen, infielder Jack Lohrke and $70,000.
- January 14 – Former New York Yankees great Joe DiMaggio marries actress Marilyn Monroe in San Francisco.
- January 20 – The Cleveland Indians and Washington Senators trade veteran catchers, with Joe Tipton going to Washington in exchange for Mickey Grasso.
- January 26 – The St. Louis Cardinals acquire first baseman Tom Alston from San Diego of the Open-Classification Pacific Coast League for pitcher Eddie Erautt, first baseman/outfielder Dick Sisler and $100,000. Alston, 27, will break the Cardinals' color line by becoming the club's first black player on April 13, 1954.

=== February ===
- February 1 – A major trade shakes up the National League. The New York Giants obtain southpaw pitchers Johnny Antonelli and Don Liddle, backup catcher Ebba St. Claire, infielder Billy Klaus and $50,000 from the Milwaukee Braves for outfielder Bobby Thomson—a Polo Grounds hero famous for authoring the Giants' pennant-winning three-run home run in 1951, known as the Shot Heard 'Round the World—and backup catcher Sam Calderone. The deal has a massive, immediate impact when Antonelli goes 21–7 and tops the NL in earned run average (2.30) to help lead the 1954 Giants to the NL championship, then he and Liddle start and win games in New York's four-game sweep of the Cleveland Indians in the 1954 World Series.
- February 2 – The newly relocated Baltimore Orioles unconditionally release all-time great hurler Satchel Paige, who went 3–9 (3.53 ERA) with 11 saves in 57 games at age 47 for the 1953 St. Louis Browns. The release does not end Paige's remarkable career, however: in 1965, at 59, he will return to the majors for the Kansas City Athletics and throw three shutout innings against the Boston Red Sox.
- February 5 – The Orioles continue to shed members of the 1953 Browns, sending infielder Johnny Lipon and outfielder Johnny Groth to the Chicago White Sox for infielder Neil Berry and outfielder Sam Mele.
- February 10 – The Milwaukee Braves trade former All-Star and no-hit pitcher Vern Bickford to the Baltimore Orioles for rookie catcher Charlie White and $10,000.
- February 13 – The Chicago White Sox trade left-handed pitcher Gene Bearden to the Seattle Rainiers of the Pacific Coast League for shortstop Alex Garbowski and minor-league hurler Art DelDuca. The trade signals the end of Bearden's MLB career; as a rookie, he had pitched the 1948 Cleveland Indians to a pennant and World Series championship.
- February 18 – The Washington Senators obtain future American League All-Star first baseman Roy Sievers from the Baltimore Orioles in exchange for left fielder Gil Coan.
- February 19
  - The Brooklyn Dodgers sign 19-year-old Puerto Rican amateur free agent Roberto Clemente to a contract worth $5,000, plus a $10,000 signing bonus. In so doing, they beat out a number of other clubs in the Clemente sweepstakes, outspending their cross-river rivals New York Giants and New York Yankees, as well as the Milwaukee Braves. The Dodgers assign Clemente immediately to the Triple-A Montreal Royals. There, the future Hall of Fame right fielder will put up decent numbers in 1954, posting a .257/.286/.372 batting line with ten extra base hits and one stolen base in 155 plate appearances. But, unfortunately for the Dodgers, Clemente will never play a game for their big-league team: Brooklyn leaves him exposed to the 1954 Rule 5 draft, where he will be selected by the Pittsburgh Pirates.
  - The Cleveland Indians obtain veteran outfielder Dave Philley from the Philadelphia Athletics for two rookie pitchers, Lee Wheat and Bill Upton, and $15,000.
- February 22 – Puerto Rico clinches its second straight Caribbean Series when its champions, the Criollos de Caguas, win their fourth game in five outings, and Panama tops Cuba.
- February 23 – The New York Yankees part company with "The Springfield Rifle," right-handed pitcher Vic Raschi, selling his contract to the St. Louis Cardinals for $85,000. Raschi, almost 35, spent all or part of eight seasons with the Bombers, going 120–50 (a winning percentage of .706) with a 3.47 earned run average in 218 American League games; he won 20 or more games for three straight seasons (1949–1951), made four All-Star teams, and led AL hurlers in strikeouts (1951). A six-time World Series champion, Raschi went 5–3 (2.24 ERA) in 11 Fall Classic games, eight of them starting assignments.

=== March ===
- March 13 – Milwaukee Braves outfielder Bobby Thomson breaks his ankle while sliding into a base during a spring training game. Thomson will be out of the Braves' lineup until July 14. In between, he is immediately replaced by a promising prospect named Hank Aaron.
- March 16 – The Philadelphia Phillies sell the contract of veteran Eddie Waitkus to the Baltimore Orioles for $40,000. Waitkus, 34, will essentially split first-base duties with Dick Kryhoski during the "modern" Orioles' maiden season in Baltimore.
- March 20 – The Milwaukee Braves obtain shortstop Roy Smalley from the Chicago Cubs for pitcher Dave Cole.
- March 28 – The Brooklyn Dodgers trade infielder and formerly highly touted prospect Bobby Morgan to the Philadelphia Phillies for $50,000 and Dick Young—not the influential New York sportswriter, but a 26-year-old second baseman.
- March 29 – Chicago Cubs player–manager Phil Cavarretta gives team owner Philip K. Wrigley an honest (and negative) assessment of the Cubs' chances for the upcoming season, then is dismissed for his defeatist attitude. He becomes the first manager ever to be given the gate during spring training. Stan Hack replaces him, even though Cavarretta is right: the Cubs will finish in seventh place this year. He spends 1954 with the crosstown Chicago White Sox and bats .316 in 77 appearances as a pinch-hitter and part-time outfielder/first baseman.

=== April ===
- April 9–10 – Nat Peeples, a 27-year-old outfielder, appears in the Double-A Atlanta Crackers' first two regular-season games and goes hitless in four at bats against the home-standing Mobile Bears before he's demoted to the Class A Jacksonville Braves. In doing so, Peeples becomes the first, and only, African-American player in the Southern Association, founded in 1901 and the highest-level minor league in America's Deep South. With Jim Crow laws still in force, the Association reverts to its all-white status and remains racially segregated until it disbands after the 1961 season.
- April 11 – To make room for promising rookie outfielder Wally Moon, the St. Louis Cardinals trade longtime great Enos Slaughter to the New York Yankees in exchange for three minor leaguers, including future (1955) National League Rookie of the Year Bill Virdon.
- April 12 – The Cleveland Indians sign future Hall-of-Famer Hal Newhouser, 32, who had been released by the Detroit Tigers on July 22, 1953. The four-time 20-game-winner will become the 1954 Tribe's lefthanded relief ace, going 7–2 (2.51 ERA) with seven saves.

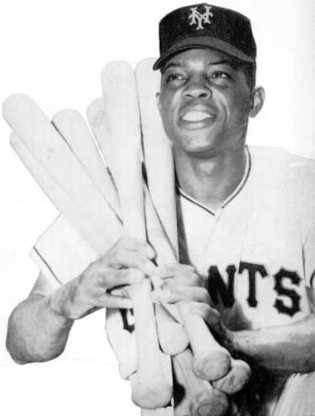
Willie Mays in 1954

- April 13
  - After performing military service, Willie Mays of the New York Giants, 22, appears in his first MLB game since May 28, 1952. Since coming to the Giants in late May of 1951, Mays' team has gone 107–48 (.690) with him on the roster, and 153–157 (.494) with him in a U.S. Army uniform. In the bottom of the sixth inning of Opening Day at the Polo Grounds, Mays hits a solo home run off Carl Erskine to break a three-all tie and secure a 4–3 victory over the arch-rival Brooklyn Dodgers—a harbinger of Mays' and the Giants' remarkable 1954 season to come.
  - The brand-new Baltimore Orioles (formerly the St. Louis Browns) open in Detroit and lose to the host Tigers, 3–0. Don Larsen takes the loss against Steve Gromek. The Tigers start fast and will win 12 of their first 18 games.
  - First baseman Tom Alston becomes the first black player in St. Louis Cardinals history.
  - Second baseman Curt Roberts becomes the first black player in Pittsburgh Pirates history.
  - At Comiskey Park, the Cleveland Indians defeat the Chicago White Sox 8–2 behind a complete game from Early Wynn and home runs from Wally Westlake and George Strickland. It's the first of 111 victories for the 1954 Indians, an American League record that will last for 44 years.
- April 15 – Baltimore hosts its first AL home opener since 1902. Following a 90-minute parade, the Orioles draw an opening-day record of 46,354 in a 3–1 afternoon win over the Chicago White Sox. The Orioles' Clint Courtney hits the first MLB home run in Baltimore's Memorial Stadium. Bob Turley strikes out nine in besting Virgil Trucks. Vern Stephens also homers for Baltimore.
- April 16 – Roy Hamey, 51, formerly George Weiss' top lieutenant in the New York Yankees' front office, succeeds owner R. R. M. Carpenter Jr. as general manager of the Philadelphia Phillies.
- April 17 – Pinch hitter Nino Escalera of the Cincinnati Redlegs becomes the first black player in the venerable franchise's history. Hitting for veteran catcher Andy Seminick in the seventh inning, Escalera singles off Lew Burdette. Cincinnati falls to the Milwaukee Braves, 5–1 at County Stadium.
- April 23 – At Sportsman's Park, now called "Busch Stadium," Hank Aaron of the Milwaukee Braves hits his first major league home run, off St. Louis Cardinals pitcher Vic Raschi. His first major league hit, a double, had also been hit off Raschi, eight days earlier. Aaron will go on to break Babe Ruth's record of 714 career home runs in 1974 and retire with 755, a record that will stand until Barry Bonds breaks it in 2007.

=== May ===
- May 2
  - Stan Musial of the St. Louis Cardinals slams five home runs in a doubleheader against the visiting New York Giants. He hits three in the first game, won by the Cardinals 10–6, and adds two in the nightcap, won by the Giants 9–7. Nate Colbert of the San Diego Padres will tie Musial's record by hitting five home runs in a 1972 doubleheader; coincidentally, an eight-year-old Colbert is in attendance today to watch Musial's feat.
  - Right-hander Don Johnson blanks the Philadelphia Athletics on two hits, 4–0, at Connie Mack Stadium in the first game of a doubleheader. It's the third straight shutout for Johnson's Chicago White Sox. The scoreless skein is broken in the nightcap, with Philadelphia's Marion Fricano getting a 2–1 victory. The doubleheader split gives Chicago (11–6) a half-game lead over the Detroit Tigers (9–5) in the American League.
- May 9 – Two ties are recorded in the American League, both caused by Sunday darkness curfews in the second games of doubleheaders. At Comiskey Park, left-handers Billy Pierce of the White Sox and Billy Hoeft of the Tigers battle to a ten-inning, scoreless tie. In The Bronx, the New York Yankees and Philadelphia Athletics play to a nine-inning, 1–1 deadlock. Per AL rules, individual statistics will count but each game will be replayed in full later in the season.
- May 12 – The Washington Senators purchase the contract of 26-year-old outfielder Jim Lemon from the Cleveland Indians. Lemon has batted only .175 over 28 games with Cleveland, but in 1956 he'll win the Senators' right field job and average 28 homers and 87 runs batted in for the next five seasons.
- May 16
  - Playing in only his third game of 1954 after breaking his collarbone in spring training, Ted Williams goes five-for-five, with two home runs, a double, and five RBI. But his Boston Red Sox drop the nightcap of a doubleheader to the Detroit Tigers, 9–8, in 14 innings at Briggs Stadium. The Red Sox are now 6–15 and last in the American League.
  - In the midst of an 11-game winning streak, the Cleveland Indians sweep the visiting Philadelphia Athletics, 12–7 and 6–0, and move into a first-place tie with the Chicago White Sox.
- May 23 – The White Sox obtain future Hall-of-Famer George Kell from the Boston Red Sox for fellow third baseman Grady Hatton and $100,000.
- May 29 – Making yet another deal, the White Sox trade catcher Red Wilson to the Detroit Tigers for another receiver, Matt Batts.

=== June ===
- June 1 – The Cleveland Indians acquire outfielder/first baseman Vic Wertz from the Baltimore Orioles for pitcher Bob Chakales. In the upcoming 1954 World Series, Wertz will make one of the most famous outs in Series history.
- June 3 – The New York Giants slug five home runs—three from third baseman Hank Thompson and two from centerfielder Willie Mays—and defeat the St. Louis Cardinals 13–8 at Busch Stadium. Thompson, with eight, and Mays (five) account for all of New York's 13 runs batted in. The win allows the Giants to move within one game of the Brooklyn Dodgers in a tight National League pennant race.

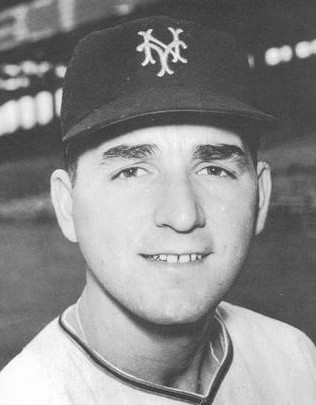
Johnny Antonelli

- June 9 – Recently acquired Johnny Antonelli of the New York Giants fires his second straight complete game shutout and improves his season mark to 8–2 (2.41 ERA) to humble his former team, the Milwaukee Braves, 4–0. Giants shortstop Alvin Dark goes four-for-four and scores two runs. The win lifts New York into a first-place tie with the Brooklyn Dodgers.
- June 11 – With his Chicago White Sox holding a slim 1½-game lead in the Junior Circuit, general manager Frank "Trader" Lane swings into action, making two deals. In the first, he acquires pitcher Sonny Dixon from the Washington Senators for fellow hurler Gus Keriazakos; then Lane deals Dixon, pitcher Al Sima, outfielder Bill Wilson and $15,000 to the Philadelphia Athletics for pitcher Morrie Martin and outfielder Ed McGhee.
- June 12
  - At Milwaukee County Stadium, Jim Wilson of the Milwaukee Braves no-hits the Philadelphia Phillies 2–0, besting Robin Roberts in the one-hour, 43-minute contest. The Braves score both runs on solo home runs: in the first inning by Johnny Logan and the fifth by Wilson's catcher, Del Crandall. The no-hitter is the first in the Braves' Milwaukee history; the franchise had moved from Boston after the 1952 season.
  - In the American League, the Cleveland Indians take a half-game lead in the pennant race, defeating the Boston Red Sox 4–3 behind Bob Feller and Don Mossi. It's the Tribe's second victory in what will be a five-game sweep of the stumbling Bosox at Fenway Park, and the second in a nine-game winning streak overall. By June 20, Cleveland's AL lead will be four full games over the Chicago White Sox.
- June 14 – The Detroit Tigers deal veteran infielder Johnny Pesky to the Washington Senators for infielder Mel Hoderlein.
- June 19 – Although not known for lavish spending on "bonus babies", the Washington Senators sign Idaho schoolboy strongman Harmon Killebrew to a $50,000 bonus contract out of Payette High School. Herman Welker, Idaho's United States Senator, recommends the youngster to Clark Griffith's team, and Welker's tip pays off when Killebrew slugs 559 homers over 21 seasons with the franchise and earns a berth in the Baseball Hall of Fame.
- June 23
  - Harvey Haddix of the St. Louis Cardinals wins his tenth straight decision and extends his consecutive scoreless-innings-pitched streak to 372/3, tops in 1954, defeating the Pittsburgh Pirates at Forbes Field, 7–1. Haddix' record is now 12–3 (2.85). His scoreless streak, which began June 4, ends in the sixth frame today.
  - In a 17-inning marathon between the two worst teams in the American League, the last-place Baltimore Orioles (23–42) defeat the seventh-place Boston Red Sox (22–39) at Memorial Stadium, 8–7. The game lasts four hours and 58 minutes, longest in AL history.
- June 29 – At the Polo Grounds, the New York Giants go 13 innings to defeat their hated rivals, the Brooklyn Dodgers, 4–3. Pinch hitter Lamar "Dusty" Rhodes' single drives home the tying and winning runs to erase a 3–2 Brooklyn lead. The Giants and Dodgers have been going head-to-head in the National League race since early June; after sweeping the Dodgers in this three-game series, the Giants will hold a four-game lead in the Senior Circuit on July 1.

=== July ===
- July 4
  - Ray Narleski throws 52/3 innings of hitless relief, Early Wynn gets the save, and Larry Doby homers and drives in two runs as the Cleveland Indians win their seventh straight game by beating the visiting Chicago White Sox, 2–1. At the season's traditional halfway point, Cleveland (52–22) leads the second-place New York Yankees (49–28) by 41/2 games in the American League.
  - In the National League, the New York Giants (50–25) split a double-header with the Pittsburgh Pirates at Forbes Field, enabling the second-place Brooklyn Dodgers (46–28) to shave a half-game off their lead; it now stands at 31/2 lengths.
- July 11 – At the Polo Grounds, the Giants' Don Mueller hits for the cycle in the opening game of a doubleheader, a 13–7 New York triumph over the Pirates in which nine different players (six of them Giants) slam home runs. The 1954 MLB season's only "cycle" marks a banner season for Mueller, 27, who will lead the NL in hits (212) and bat .342, second only to teammate Willie Mays.
- July 13 – The American League makes an eighth-inning comeback at Cleveland Municipal Stadium to win the All–Star Game, 11–9. Washington Senators rookie left-hander Dean Stone is the winning pitcher without officially facing a batter, as he throws out Red Schoendienst trying to steal home in the top of the 8th, ending that half of the inning.
- July 15 – When the All-Star break ends, the 40–37 Philadelphia Phillies have a new manager in their dugout: former St. Louis Cardinals standout centerfielder Terry Moore, 42, who takes over for 63-year-old veteran Steve O'Neill. Moore has never managed before, while O'Neill has reached the end of a 14-year career as a pilot of four MLB teams, highlighted by his leadership of the 1945 World Series champion Detroit Tigers. The change doesn't light a fire under the Phils, however: they will go only 35–42 under Moore in his half-season as their skipper.
- July 19
  - At Crosley Field, Harry Perkowski of the Cincinnati Redlegs throws an 11-inning, three-hit, complete-game shutout against the league-leading New York Giants. His battery mate, catcher Hobie Landrith, smacks a solo, walk-off home run in the home half of the 11th to secure the victory. The setback leaves the 60–30 Giants six games ahead of second-place Brooklyn.
  - Meanwhile, in the American League, both the first-place Cleveland Indians (61–28) and the runner-up New York Yankees (61–29) win. The two teams have kept in lockstep, with Cleveland a half-game in front of the Bombers, for nine straight days—since before the All-Star break.
  - Mickey Owen of the Boston Red Sox bashes a two-out, walk-off grand slam off Mike Blyzka to cap a five-run ninth inning and beat the Baltimore Orioles, 9–7, in the first game of a doubleheader at Fenway Park. The Red Sox also win the night game 8–5.
- July 22 – The Yankees sign veteran free-agent pitcher Ralph Branca, 28, the former Brooklyn Dodger who had been released by the Detroit Tigers on July 11.
- July 25
  - Jack Harshman of the Chicago White Sox sets a team record by striking out 16 in a 5–2 complete game victory over the Boston Red Sox. The previous White Sox mark (15) was shared by Eddie Cicotte, Ed Walsh and Jim Scott. Harshman's 16 Ks are the most strikeouts in Fenway Park history and the record will stand for 32 years until April 29, 1986, when Roger Clemens becomes the first MLB pitcher to strike out 20 players in a nine-inning game.
  - At Connie Mack Stadium, Bob Turley of the Baltimore Orioles walks 12 Philadelphia Athletics hitters in only 62/3 innings pitched. Shockingly, he allows only two runs and leaves the contest with a 4–2 lead. Turley, 23, will lead the American League with 181 bases on balls allowed in 2471/3 innings pitched in 1954; today's game is one of five in which he walks nine or more men. But, his career will turn around when he's dealt to the New York Yankees in a massive, 17-player trade on November 17.

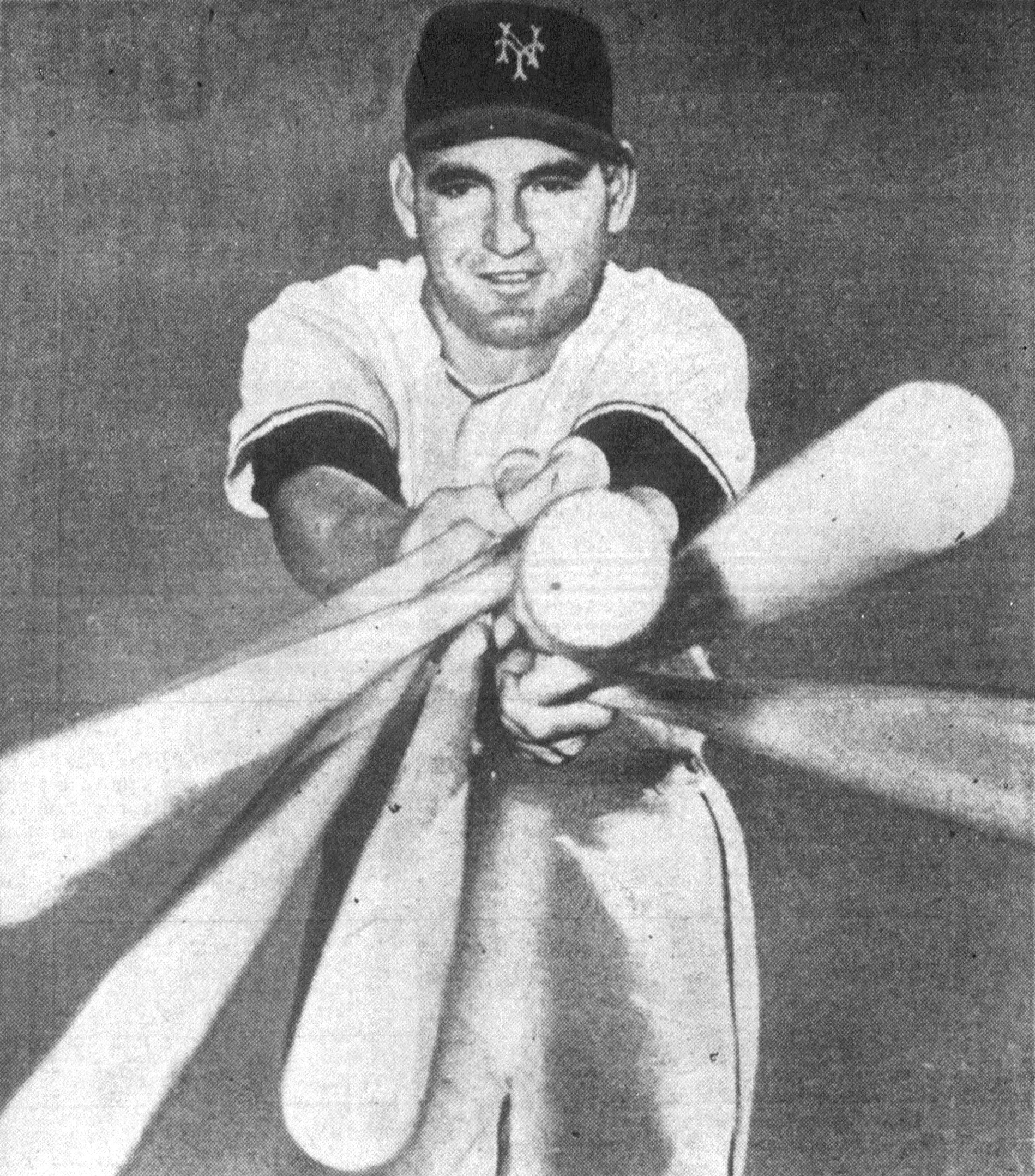
Dusty Rhodes

- July 28 – Dusty Rhodes of the New York Giants goes three-for-three (all home runs), scores four times, and drives in four runs in support of Johnny Antonelli, as the Giants shut out the St. Louis Cardinals at the Polo Grounds, 10–0. Antonelli improves to 15–2 on the season, and backup outfielder and pinch hitter Rhodes improves his season-long batting average to an astronomical .474 (27 for 57 in 42 games played). Rhodes' remarkable regular season (.341, 15 homers and 1.105 OPS in 186 plate appearances) will continue with his clutch hitting (.667, 2, 2.381 in 7 PA) in the 1954 World Series.
- July 31 – Joe Adcock of the Milwaukee Braves belts four home runs in today's game, becoming the seventh player to do so in major league history. En route, he victimizes four different pitchers. Adcock also adds a double to go five-for-five, with five runs scored, 18 total bases, and seven runs batted in. The Braves beat the Brooklyn Dodgers, 15–7, at Ebbets Field.

=== August ===
- August 4 – Earle Mack, one of three co-owners of the Philadelphia Athletics, reveals that Chicago-based businessman Arnold Johnson's reported $4.5 million bid for the team is the only offer the nearly destitute franchise has received. If his bid succeeds, Johnson plans to move the Athletics to Kansas City, Missouri, where voters have approved a $2 million bond issue for renovation and expansion of Blues Stadium, which Johnson owns and operates. Says Mack: "There isn't a chance at keeping the team in Philadelphia as far as finances are concerned."
- August 13 – Jack Harshman throws a 16-inning, nine-hit, complete-game shutout and Minnie Miñoso's RBI triple scores Nellie Fox with the game's only run, as the Chicago White Sox down the Detroit Tigers 1–0 at Comiskey Park. Detroit's Al Aber, who goes 151/3 innings, is the hard-luck loser. The win allows the third-place ChiSox to stay 71/2 games behind the first-place Cleveland Indians.
- August 15 – At Ebbets Field, the visiting New York Giants out-homer the Brooklyn Dodgers, four to two, but all four blasts come with the bases empty and the Dodgers claim a 9–4 victory. Billy Loes (8–3) is the winning pitcher, as Brooklyn creeps to within a half-game of the league-leading Giants.
- August 22 – Sitting 41/2 games out of first, the New York Yankees acquire veteran relief pitcher Jim Konstanty on waivers from the Philadelphia Phillies. Konstanty, 37, was the 1950 NL Most Valuable Player as the relief ace of the "Whiz Kids" Phillies. Although he's extremely effective as a Yankee (0.98 earned run average, one win and two saves) in nine games down the stretch, it's not enough to enable New York to catch the front-running Cleveland Indians.

=== September ===
- September 1 – The last full month of the major-league season begins with the New York Giants (82–47) holding a 31/2-game lead over the Brooklyn Dodgers (79–51) in the National League, and the Cleveland Indians (95–36) in front of the New York Yankees (89–41) by 51/2 contests in the American League.
- September 5 – During what turns out to be the All-American Girls Professional Baseball League's final game, Kalamazoo Lassies' June Peppas pitches a complete game and drives in four runs in an 8–5 victory against the Fort Wayne Daisies, to clinch the championship title. The league folds after twelve years of uninterrupted activities.
- September 6 – Cuban outfielder Carlos Paula becomes the first black player in Washington Senators history.
- September 8 – The first-place New York Giants beef up their catching corps for the stretch drive by claiming Joe Garagiola on waivers from the Chicago Cubs. Garagiola, 28, is wrapping up a nine-year MLB playing career before moving to the broadcast booth, where he will become a Ford C. Frick Award winner.
- September 12 – Behind future Baseball Hall of Famers Bob Lemon (22–6) and Early Wynn (21–11), the Cleveland Indians sweep a doubleheader from the visiting New York Yankees to increase their American League lead to 81/2 games.
- September 14 – Paul Richards resigns as skipper of the Chicago White Sox to become both field manager and general manager of the Baltimore Orioles. As their pilot, Richards, 45, has led the ChiSox' renaissance on the field, going 342–265 (.607) since the opening of the 1951 season. In Baltimore, he will be entrusted with building the lowly Orioles into a winner. Although his front office duties begin immediately, Richards allows incumbent Orioles' skipper Jimmy Dykes to finish the 1954 season before he will take over in the O's dugout. Meanwhile, in Chicago, coach and former St. Louis Cardinals star shortstop Marty Marion becomes the White Sox' new manager.
- September 18 – The Cleveland Indians clinch the 1954 American League pennant by defeating the Detroit Tigers 3–2 in a rain-soaked contest at Briggs Stadium. Early Wynn wins his 23rd game. It's Cleveland's third AL flag overall, and their first since 1948.
- September 19 – Only 1,915 fans are on hand at Connie Mack Stadium to witness the New York Yankees defeat the Philadelphia Athletics in what proves to be the last home game played in the franchise's 54-year tenure in Philadelphia.
- September 20 – Sal Maglie allows only five hits and Hank Thompson drives in the deciding run, leading the New York Giants to a pennant-clinching 7–1 victory over the Brooklyn Dodgers at Ebbets Field. It's the Giants' 17th National League championship dating to 1888—and it will be their last representing New York City.
- September 25 – In their penultimate regular-season game, the Indians thrash the Detroit Tigers 11–1 at Cleveland Stadium to set a new American League record of 111 victories in a 154-game season. The previous AL mark of 110 wins was set by the 1927 "Murderers' Row" New York Yankees, often ranked as one of the greatest all-time teams.
- September 26 – The end of the American League's regular season schedule reveals a stark imbalance between the top three teams—Cleveland (111–43), New York (103–51) and Chicago (94–60)—and the rest of the loop. Fourth-place Boston (69–85), though nominally in the "first division," finishes 42 games out of first place, which is the weakest record of any fourth-place club since the modern era began in 1901. The AL's lopsided standings spur an unprecedented turnover in its managerial ranks, in which six of the eight league clubs change field leaders between September 14 and the start of the 1955 campaign. Only Al López of Cleveland and Casey Stengel of New York survive.

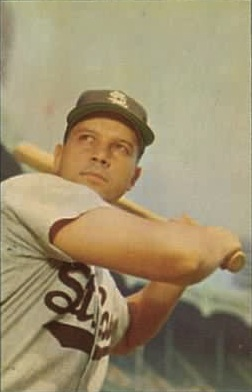
Vic Wertz in 1953

- September 29 – In Game 1 of the 1954 World Series, with the score tied 2–2 and two base runners in the eighth inning, New York Giants center fielder Willie Mays makes one of the greatest catches in history when he races back in the Polo Grounds to make an over-the-head catch of Vic Wertz' 462-foot drive. Wertz, who had driven in the Cleveland Indians' two runs in the first inning, will finish the day 4-for-5, including a double and a triple. The Giants go on to win the game in extra innings, 5–2, thanks to a pinch-hit three-run home run by Dusty Rhodes off Bob Lemon in the bottom of the 11th inning. Since then, The Catch is a term used to refer to the memorable defensive play executed by Mays.

=== October ===
- October 1 – The Cincinnati Redlegs trade pitcher Harry Perkowski and outfielders Jim Bolger and Ted Tappe to the Chicago Cubs for pitchers Johnny Klippstein and Jim Willis.
- October 2 – The New York Giants defeat the Cleveland Indians, 7–4, in Game 4 of the 1954 World Series to win their fifth World Series championship, four games to none. After finishing the regular schedule with an American League-record 111 wins, Cleveland fails to win a Series game. This is the Giants' fifth Fall Classic title, and their first in 21 years. They will not win another World Series until 2010, more than 50 years after they moved to San Francisco.
- October 8 – The Baltimore Orioles acquire pitcher Ray Moore from the Brooklyn Dodgers for infielder Vinicio "Chico" García.
- October 12 – After a daylong meeting in Chicago, American League magnates unanimously—but provisionally—approve the transfer of the Philadelphia Athletics to Kansas City. The provision demands that Roy Mack, one of the club's three co-owners, convince his legendary father, Connie, and his brother Earle to approve the team's sale to Arnold Johnson and its shift to Missouri. Meanwhile, four other bids for the club, including two local groups who want to keep the Athletics in Philadelphia, emerge. However, according to AL president Will Harridge, only the Johnson offer is considered "really sound."
- October 14–15 – Teams from Philadelphia and Kansas City remain in the news—but neither are the Athletics—when the National League's Philadelphia Phillies hire Mayo Smith, 39, as their manager for 1955. The Phils then purchase the contracts of first baseman Pancho Herrera and pitcher Hank Mason from the Kansas City Monarchs of the Negro American League.
- October 19 – The St. Louis Cardinals release veteran left-hander Al Brazle on his 41st birthday. Brazle had led the National League in saves in both 1952 and 1953 and has won 97 games in a Cardinal uniform since joining them in 1943.
- October 28 – Defying reports that three American League owners—Clark Griffith, Tom Yawkey and Spike Briggs—have formed a bloc devoted to keeping the moribund Athletics franchise in Philadelphia under new ownership, AL moguls vote down the club's possible sale to a group of businessmen based in that city. It's known that owners Dan Topping and Del Webb of the New York Yankees strongly favor Arnold Johnson's bid to buy the team and move it to Kansas City. The following day, on October 29, patriarch and Baseball Hall of Famer Connie Mack charges that the American League is forcing a move to Kansas City and publicly reprimands his eldest son, Roy, for supporting the sale to Johnson.

=== November ===
- November 5 – The fate of the Philadelphia Athletics is finally sealed when, after a bitter family squabble, Connie Mack and son Earle capitulate to Earle's brother Roy's desire to sell the team to Chicago businessman Arnold Johnson for $3.5 million. Connie Mack, 91, signs the sale agreement from his sickbed. The club will immediately abandon Philadelphia and move to Kansas City for 1955.
- November 8 – R. R. M. Carpenter Jr., owner of Philadelphia's lone surviving MLB team, the Phillies, tells the press he will reluctantly purchase Connie Mack Stadium from Arnold Johnson, new owner of the soon-to-be-called Kansas City Athletics. The Phillies have shared the ballpark, built in 1909, as tenants of the Athletics since 1938, and have no other suitable place to play until a modern stadium can be built.
- November 16 – Future Hall-of-Fame slugger Ralph Kiner becomes a "player to be named later" in an earlier (September 30) transaction when the Chicago Cubs ship him to the Cleveland Indians as part-payment for pitcher Sam "Toothpick" Jones. The trade will conclude on November 30 when the Cubs receive outfielder Gale Wade (also a "PTBNL") and $60,000 from Cleveland.
- November 18 – The newly relocated Kansas City Athletics hire Lou Boudreau, 37, as their manager for 1955. Boudreau is a future Baseball Hall of Fame shortstop who, as player–manager, led the 1948 Cleveland Indians to the World Series championship. His hiring highlights the managerial turmoil in the American League that sees six of the eight AL teams change pilots beginning on September 14. On that day, Marty Marion became skipper of the Chicago White Sox when Paul Richards quit the third-place club to join the Baltimore Orioles as both general manager and field manager. Since the end of the 1954 season:
  - Fourth-place Boston fires Boudreau and replaces him with Pinky Higgins, skipper of American Association and Junior World Series champion Louisville.
  - Fifth-place Detroit refuses Fred Hutchinson's request for a multi-year contract and replaces him with veteran Bucky Harris.
  - Sixth-place Washington hires Chuck Dressen as its manager to fill Harris's slot when Bucky joins the Tigers.
  - Seventh-place Baltimore allows incumbent skipper Jimmy Dykes to finish the regular season before Richards takes on his field management role in spring training of 1955.
  - The eighth-place Athletics, in transition from Philadelphia to their new home in Kansas City, hire Boudreau to replace player–manager Eddie Joost.
- November 22 – In the Rule 5 draft, the Pittsburgh Pirates select 20-year-old outfielder Roberto Clemente from the roster of the Montreal Royals, Triple-A affiliate of the Brooklyn Dodgers. Although Clemente—in his first pro season—hit only .257 in 155 at bats for Montreal, he will become a Hall of Famer with the Pirates, for whom he will play the remainder of his brilliant, 18-year MLB career and never again appear in a minor-league game.

=== December ===
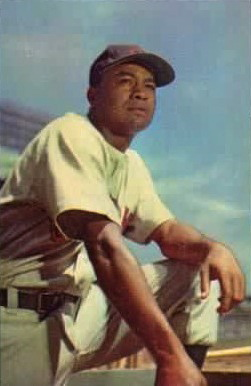
1954 AL MVP runner-up Larry Doby

- December 1 – The New York Yankees and Baltimore Orioles complete a 17-player trade, the largest trade in major league history. The first phase of the transaction began November 18 and will conclude today after the major league draft. Baltimore send pitchers Mike Blyzka, Don Larsen and Bob Turley; catcher Darrell Johnson; infielders Billy Hunter and Dick Kryhoski; and outfielder Jim Fridley to the Yankees, in exchange for pitchers Harry Byrd, Jim McDonald and Bill Miller; catchers Hal Smith and Gus Triandos; infielders Don Leppert, Willy Miranda and Kal Segrist; and outfielders Gene Woodling and Ted Del Guercio.
- December 6 – The wheeler-dealer general manager of the Chicago White Sox, "Frantic Frank" Lane, makes three trades involving 13 players:
  - He begins by purchasing the contract of diminutive southpaw Don Ferrarese from the Oakland Oaks of the Pacific Coast League.
  - Lane then trades pitchers Ferrarese and Don Johnson, catcher Matt Batts and infielder Fred Marsh to the Baltimore Orioles for pitcher Bob Chakales, catcher Clint Courtney and infielder Jim Brideweser.
  - Finally, Lane's White Sox deal pitcher Leo Cristante and two first basemen, two-time former batting champion Ferris Fain and Jack Phillips, to the Detroit Tigers for left-hander Ted Gray, first baseman Walt Dropo and outfielder Bob Nieman.
- December 8 – The St. Louis Cardinals deal veteran starting pitcher Gerry Staley and third baseman and 1954 All-Star Ray Jablonski to the Cincinnati Redlegs for relief pitcher Frank Smith, who finished second in the National League with 20 saves during 1954.
- December 9 – Yogi Berra, Hall-of-Fame catcher of the New York Yankees, wins the 1954 American League Most Valuable Player Award, the second MVP trophy of his career. Larry Doby, centerfielder for the AL champion Cleveland Indians, is the runner-up.
- December 13 – The Baltimore Orioles acquire two aging stars of the 1950s Brooklyn Dodgers, left-handed pitcher Preacher Roe and third baseman Billy Cox, for two minor-leaguers and $50,000. Roe, 38, retires rather than report to Baltimore, while an injured Cox, 35, appears in 53 games until he's traded in June 1955, then also retires.
- December 14 – The Brooklyn Dodgers sign 18-year-old left-hander Sandy Koufax to a $30,000 "bonus baby" contract. Koufax, then a sophomore at the University of Cincinnati, is a Brooklyn native who has electrified Dodger scouts during an earlier tryout at Ebbets Field.
- December 15 – Willie Mays, brilliant 23-year-old centerfielder of the world champion New York Giants, wins the National League Most Valuable Player Award. In 1954, Mays led the NL in batting (.345), slugging percentage (.667) and OPS (1.078), and finished third in home runs (41). His iconic defensive play in Game 1 of the World Series came after the MVP voting period had ended.
- December 19 – St. Louis Cardinals centerfielder Wally Moon, 24, wins the 1954 National League Rookie of the Year Award. Two days later, New York Yankees 20-game-winner Bob Grim, also 24, takes home "ROTY" honors in the American League.

== Births ==
=== January ===
- January 5 – John Littlefield
- January 8 – Yasushi Tao
- January 13 – Steve Comer
- January 14 – Danny Boone
- January 15 – George Cappuzzello
- January 16 – Dave Stapleton
- January 17 – Jerry Turner
- January 18 – Scott McGregor
- January 19 – Rich Gale
- January 23 – Garry Hancock
- January 24 – Timothy Jones
- January 26
  - Blake Doyle
  - Brian Doyle
- January 30
  - Joe Kerrigan
  - Dave Stegman

=== February ===
- February 1 – Mark Souza
- February 2
  - Puchy Delgado
  - Rob Dressler
  - John Tudor
- February 4 – Al Javier
- February 8 – Joe Maddon
- February 10 – Larry McWilliams
- February 13 – Donnie Moore
- February 17 – Mike Macha
- February 24 – Dave Edwards
- February 25 – Bob Brenly
- February 26 – Jeff Yurak
- February 28 – John Poloni

=== March ===
- March 4 – Mark Wagner
- March 7
  - Mike Armstrong
  - Nyls Nyman
- March 8 – Win Remmerswaal
- March 12 – Larry Rothschild
- March 13
  - Randy Bass
  - Terry Leach
- March 16 – Dan Duran
- March 20
  - Steve McCatty
  - Paul Mirabella
- March 29
  - Mike Ramsey
  - Tom Tellmann

=== April ===
- April 3 – Larry Littleton
- April 6 – Ken Clay
- April 8 – Gary Carter
- April 11 – Willie Royster
- April 14
  - Craig Mitchell
  - Casey Parsons
- April 16 – Bruce Robinson
- April 17 – Denny Walling
- April 20
  - Doug Clarey
  - Mike O'Berry
- April 22
  - Dan O'Brien
  - Bill Paschall
- April 25
  - Craig Minetto
  - Greg Wells
- April 29 – Danny Garcia
- April 30 – Joe Strain

=== May ===
- May 1 – Roy Lee Jackson
- May 2
  - Keith Moreland
  - Steve Rippley
- May 6 – Albert Williams
- May 9
  - Tom Chism
  - George Enright
- May 19 – Rick Cerone
- May 22 – Mark Mercer
- May 24 – Bobby Brown
- May 25 – Bob Knepper
- May 26 – Kevin Kennedy
- May 31 – Greg Erardi

=== June ===
- June 5 – Dennis Blair
- June 8 – Lenn Sakata
- June 19 – Johnnie LeMaster
- June 20 – Tony Chévez
- June 25 – Bob Shirley
- June 29 – Rick Honeycutt

=== July ===
- July 4
  - Jim Beattie
  - Dan Larson
- July 6
  - Willie Randolph
  - Jason Thompson
- July 10 – Andre Dawson
- July 14 – Chuck Rainey
- July 16 – Jim Lentine
- July 18 – Harry Spilman
- July 19 – Dan Graham
- July 20 – Gary Woods
- July 27 – Brian Kingman
- July 30 – Ellis Valentine

=== August ===
- August 1 – Roger Miller
- August 6 – Ken Phelps
- August 7
  - Steve Kemp
  - Yasuyuki Nakai
- August 8 – Mark Ross
- August 11 – Gary Holle
- August 14 – Mark Fidrych
- August 19
  - Reggie Baldwin
  - Ned Yost
- August 21 – Bruce Berenyi
- August 24 – Chris Batton
- August 25 – Pete Redfern
- August 31
  - Jack Perconte
  - Claudell Washington

=== September ===
- September 2
  - John Flinn
  - Rick Manning
- September 6 – Steve Macko
- September 7
  - Craig Eaton
  - John Hirschbeck
- September 8
  - Don Aase
  - Jim Smith
- September 10
  - Craig Cacek
  - Preston Hanna
- September 13
  - John Harris
  - Billy Smith
- September 16 – Dave Koza
- September 17 – Wayne Krenchicki
- September 20
  - Bob Detherage
  - Mickey Klutts
- September 21 – Frank MacCormack
- September 22 – Hal Dues
- September 27 – Len Matuszek

=== October ===
- October 3
  - Dennis Eckersley
  - Joe Gates
  - Bert Roberge
- October 4
  - Bill Atkinson
  - Dennis Littlejohn
- October 6 – Roger Weaver
- October 9 – Randy Lerch
- October 12
  - Garth Iorg
  - Gil Kubski
- October 13 – George Frazier
- October 14 – Willie Aikens
- October 15 – Glenn Gulliver
- October 16
  - Chris Bourjos
  - Mike Dimmel
- October 21 – Keith Drumright
- October 22 – Jamie Quirk
- October 23 – John Castino
- October 25 – Tito Landrum
- October 28
  - Gary Rajsich
  - Sammy Stewart
- October 29 – Kip Young

=== November ===
- November 1 – Miguel Diloné
- November 8 – Gary Lucas
- November 9 – Al Greene
- November 10 – Bob Stanley
- November 11
  - Bob Long
  - Ron Musselman
- November 14 – Willie Hernández
- November 18 – Craig Stimac
- November 21
  - Alan Hargesheimer
  - Gary Wilson
- November 23
  - Glenn Brummer
  - Broderick Perkins
  - Ken Schrom
- November 30 – Juan Berenguer

=== December ===
- December 1 – Dan Schatzeder
- December 2 – Julio Cruz
- December 4 – Tucker Ashford
- December 5 – Gary Roenicke
- December 6 – Mike Parrott
- December 11 – Bob Sykes
- December 22 – Sheldon Burnside
- December 22 – Ken Landreaux
- December 25 – Jeff Little
- December 26 – Ozzie Smith

== Deaths ==
=== January ===
- January 5 – Rabbit Maranville, 62, Hall of Fame shortstop and second baseman for five National League clubs over 23 years between 1912 and 1935, a diminutive and rambunctious character who had the range to top middle infielders in putouts (six times), assists (four), double plays (five), and fielding average (three), as well as the cleanup hitter of the 1914 Boston Braves Miracle Team, who after being in last place on the Fourth of July, rallied and posted a 68–19 record to win the National League pennant and then, as heavy underdogs, swept the heavily favored Philadelphia Athletics in four straight games to clinch the 1914 World Series.
- January 7
  - C. Joseph Maney, 69, construction executive who in 1944 became co-owner of Boston Braves as one of the "Three Little Steam Shovels" before selling his share to partner Louis R. Perini in 1952.
  - Red Schillings, 53, relief pitcher in four games for the 1922 Philadelphia Athletics.
- January 9 – Skeeter Shelton, 65, outfielder who played the New York Yankees in the 1915 season, and later served as a baseball coach in West Virginia University from 1918 to 1920 and at Marshall University from 1922 to 1923.
- January 11 – Sumner Bowman, 86, pitcher who played from 1890 to 1891 for the Philadelphia Phillies, Pittsburgh Alleghenys and Philadelphia Athletics.
- January 16
  - Clay Perry, 72, third baseman for the Detroit Tigers in their 1908 season.
  - Fred Payne, 73, catcher who played from 1906 through 1911 for the Detroit Tigers and Chicago White Sox.
- January 20 – Bunny Madden, 71, catcher for the Boston Red Sox and Philadelphia Phillies between 1909 and 1911.

=== February ===
- February 1 – Norman Plitt, 60, pitcher who played with the Brooklyn Robins and New York Giants in part of two seasons spanning 1918–1927.
- February 4 – Ollie Smith, 88, outfielder who played for the Louisville Colonels in the 1894 season.
- February 5 – Ed Warner, 64, pitcher for the 1912 Pittsburgh Pirates.
- February 10 – Heinie Berger, 72, one of the many German baseball players in the early part of the 20th century, who pitched from 1905 through 1910 for the Cleveland Naps of the American League.
- February 13 – Walter Ancker, 60, pitcher who played briefly for the Philadelphia Athletics in the 1915 season.
- February 15
  - John Callahan, 79, pitcher for the St. Louis Browns of the National League in the 1898 season.
  - John Gillespie, 53, pitcher who appeared in 31 games for the Cincinnati Reds during the 1922 season.
- February 16 – Red Parnell, 48, All-Star left fielder and manager in the Negro leagues, most notably for the Philadelphia Stars club from 1936 to 1943.
- February 20 – Sadie McMahon, 86, 19th century pitcher who played for the Philadelphia Athletics, Baltimore Orioles and Brooklyn Bridegrooms in a span of nine seasons from 1889 through 1897, sporting a 173-127 record and a 3.51 ERA in 351 games, while leading the American Association in wins (36), strikeouts (291), games pitched (60) and innings (509) during the 1890 season.
- February 22 – Chief Wilson, 70, outfielder best known for setting the single-season record for triples in 1912 with 36, a record that still stands, who played for the Pittsburgh Pirates and St. Louis Cardinals during nine seasons from 1908 to 1916, and was also a member of the 1909 World Series Champion Pirates.

=== March ===
- March 1 – Marv Gudat, 50, utility first baseman and outfielder in 69 games for the Cincinnati Reds in the 1929 season and the Chicago Cubs in 1932.
- March 10 – George Textor, 67, catcher who played for the Indianapolis Hoosiers and Newark Peppers of the outlaw Federal League over parts of two seasons from 1914 to 1915.
- March 11 – Bill Bradley, 76, third baseman for the Cleveland Bluebirds in the inaugural game of the American League in 1901, who was recognized as one of the best third basemen in baseball prior to 1950, along with Jimmy Collins and Pie Traynor, while leading during the first seven years of the league in fielding average four times, three times in double plays, twice in putouts, and once in assists, setting a league record of seven putouts in one game in both 1901 and 1909, also batting .300 or better three consecutive years and becoming the first player to hit one home run in four straight games in 1902, a record not matched until Babe Ruth did it in the 1918 season.
- March 12 – J. A. Robert Quinn, 84, executive; principal owner of the Boston Red Sox from 1923 to 1933 and the Boston Braves from 1936 to 1945; also served as business manager of St. Louis Browns and general manager of Brooklyn Dodgers; patriarch of a four-generation baseball family.
- March 16 – George Grantham, 53, second baseman for the Chicago Cubs, Pittsburgh Pirates, Cincinnati Reds and New York Giants in a span of 13 seasons from 1922 to 1934, who hit over .300 every season from 1924 to 1931, and also was a member of the Pirates teams that won the World Series in 1925 and the National League pennant in 1927.
- March 19
  - Charlie Babb, 81, shortstop who played from 1903 through 1905 for the New York Giants and Brooklyn Superbas, managing later in the Minor Leagues from 1906 to 1913.
  - Frank Fahey, 58, left fielder and pitcher for the 1918 Philadelphia Athletics.
- March 22 – Harry LaRoss, 66, outfielder who played for the Cincinnati Reds in 1914.
- March 24 – Chubby Snyder, 63, Danish and German American catcher who appeared in just one game in 1914 with the Buffalo Buffeds of the Federal League.

=== April ===
- April 15 – Chick Holmes, 58, pitcher for the Philadelphia Athletics during the 1918 season.
- April 19 – Red Gunkel, 60, pitcher who played in 1916 for the Cleveland Indians.

=== May ===
- May 4 – Otto McIvor, 69, outfielder for the 1911 St. Louis Cardinals.
- May 7 – Les Channell, 68, backup outfielder who played with the New York Highlanders in the 1910 season and for the New York Yankees in 1914.
- May 10 – Eddie Files, 70, pitcher who played with the Philadelphia Athletics during the 1908 season.
- May 11 – Dorsey Riddlemoser, 78, pitcher for the 1899 Washington Senators.
- May 17
  - Roy Parker, 58, pitcher who played briefly for the St. Louis Cardinals in the 1919 season, just after serving in the United States Navy during World War I.
  - Earl Tyree, 64, catcher for the 1914 Chicago Cubs.
- May 22 – Chief Bender, 70, Hall of Fame Native American pitcher who won 212 games and hurled a no-hitter, while starring for three Philadelphia Athletics World Series Champion teams, being also the first pitcher in a World Series of six games to throw three complete games.
- May 23 – Bill Davidson, 70, outfielder who played with the Chicago Cubs in 1909, and for the Brooklyn Superbas and Dodgers teams from 1910 to 1911.
- May 24 – Charlie Biggs, 47, pitcher who played for the Chicago White Sox in 1932.

=== June ===
- June 1
  - George Caithamer, 43, catcher for the 1934 Chicago White Sox.
  - Vern Duncan, 64, center fielder who played with the Philadelphia Phillies in 1913 and for the Baltimore Terrapins from 1914 to 1915.
- June 3 – Zaza Harvey, 75, outfielder who played from 1900 through 1902 for the Chicago Orphans, Chicago White Sox and Cleveland Bronchos.
- June 8 – Tom O'Hara, 73, outfielder for the St. Louis Cardinals in the 1906 and 1907 seasons.
- June 15 – Lew Carr, 81, utility infielder for the 1901 Pittsburgh Pirates.
- June 23 – Red Massey, 63, outfielder who played with the Boston Braves in the 1918 season.
- June 26 – Charlie Pick, 66, infielder who played with four different teams in part of six seasons spanning 1914–1920, most notably for the 1918 National League champion Chicago Cubs.

=== July ===
- July 8 – Wiley Taylor, 66, pitcher who played from 1911 through 1914 for the Detroit Tigers, Chicago White Sox and St. Louis Browns.
- July 13
  - Ed Porray, 65, pitcher for the 1914 Buffalo Buffeds, who is best known as being the only Major League player born at sea.
  - Grantland Rice, 73, "The Dean of American Sportswriters"; though famed for his football reportage, his baseball coverage made him a posthumous recipient of the 1966 J. G. Taylor Spink Award.
- July 15 – Chris Mahoney, 69, pitcher and outfielder for the 1910 Boston Red Sox.
- July 16 – Jack Bracken, 73, pitcher who played for the Cleveland Blues in 1901.
- July 28 – Jim Bagby, 64, Cleveland Indians star pitcher who led the American League with 31 victories in 1920, defeating the Detroit Tigers, 10–1, in a clinching game for the pennant, then defeating the Brooklyn Robins in the 1920 World Series, 8–1, while hitting the first home run by a pitcher in World Series history, en route to a world championship for the Indians.
- July 29 – Babe Borton, 65, first baseman who played for the Chicago White Sox, New York Yankees, St. Louis Terriers and St. Louis Browns in part of four seasons between 1912 and 1916.

=== August ===
- August 3 – Art Hoelskoetter, 71, utility man who played all nine positions in his four seasons for the St. Louis Cardinals from 1905 to 1908, though he played at least 15 games at all the positions, except only one game in left field.
- August 14 – Fabian Kowalik, 46, who pitched with four teams in a span of three seasons from 1932 to 1936, notably as a member of the 1935 NL Champion Chicago Cubs.
- August 29 – Jack Ferry, 67, pitcher for the Pittsburgh Pirates from 1910 to 1913.

=== September ===
- September 1 – Wimpy Quinn, 36, pitcher for the Chicago Cubs in 1941, who later played and managed in the Minor Leagues with the Bakersfield Indians.
- September 2 – Fred Osborn, 70, center fielder for the Philadelphia Phillies over parts of three seasons from 1907 to 1909.
- September 5 – Maurice Archdeacon, 55, center fielder who played from 1923 through 1925 for the Chicago White Sox; as a minor-leaguer, scored 166, 151 and 162 runs in successive International League seasons (1921–1923).
- September 13 – Roy Grimes, 61, infielder who played briefly for the New York Giants in 1920; twin brother of first baseman Ray Grimes
- September 21 – Herbie Moran, 70, right fielder who played with four clubs in a span of seven seasons from 1908 to 1915, most prominently for the 1914 Boston Braves Miracle Team, who, as heavy underdogs, won the National League pennant and later swept the heavily favored Philadelphia Athletics in four straight games to clinch the 1914 World Series.
- September 23 – John Wilson, 64, who pitched in three games for the Washington Senators during its 1913 season.

=== October ===
- October 5 – Oscar Charleston, 57, Hall of Fame Negro leagues outfielder and manager, a powerful hitter who could hit to all fields and bunt, steal a hundred bases a year, hit over .300 consistently, and cover center field as well as anyone.
- October 6 – Josh Devore, 66, outfielder for the Cincinnati Reds, Philadelphia Phillies, New York Giants and Boston Braves during seven season from 1908 to 1914, who arrived in time for the Miracle Braves stretch run which saw them win the National League pennant and the 1914 World Series.
- October 12 – Walter Holke, 61, first baseman for the New York Giants, Boston Braves, Philadelphia Phillies and Cincinnati Reds in part of 11 seasons spanning 1914–1925, who holds the record for the most fielding chances by a player in a game with 43, 42 put-outs and one assist during a 26-inning, 1–1 tie game between the Boston Braves and the Brooklyn Robins on May 1, 1920.
- October 14 – Bill Swanson, 66, backup infielder for the 1914 Boston Red Sox.
- October 19 – Dave Davenport, 64, pitcher for the Cincinnati Reds, St. Louis Terriers and St. Louis Browns from 1914 through 1919, who posted a 22-18 record and 2.20 ERA while playing for the Terriers of the Federal League in 1915, leading also the league in games (55), starts (46), complete games (30), shutouts (10), strikeouts (229) and innings (392 2/3).
- October 19 – Hugh Duffy, 87, Hall of Fame center fielder who posted an all-time record .438 batting average in 1894, one of the top hitters of the 1890s that recorded more hits, home runs and runs batted in than any other player in the game, while also teaming with fellow Hall of Famer Tommy McCarthy to form the called Heavenly Twins outfield tandem for the Boston Beaneaters, which captured two National League pennants and a pre-modern World Series Championship in 1892 and 1893.
- October 21 – Art Gardiner, 54, pitcher who appeared in just one game with the Philadelphia Phillies in the 1923 season.
- October 22 – Earl Whitehill, 55, dominant left-handed pitcher with four teams from 1923 to 1939, while helping the Washington Senators win the American League pennant in 1933, whose 218 career wins ranks him 79th in Major League history.

=== November ===
- November 7
  - Art Bues, 66, third baseman who played with the Boston Braves in the 1913 season and for the Chicago Cubs in 1914.
  - Charlie Frisbee, 80, backup outfielder for the Boston Beaneaters and New York Giants between 1899 and 1900.
- November 20 – Hod Fenner, 57, pitcher who played for the Chicago White Sox in the 1921 season.
- November 21 – Uel Eubanks, 51, pitcher for the 1922 Chicago Cubs.
- November 22 – Charlie Gibson, 75, catcher who played in 1905 for the Philadelphia Athletics.
- November 26 – Bill Doak, 63, pitcher for three different clubs in a span of sixteen seasons from 1912 to 1929, eleven of them with the St. Louis Cardinals, who won 20 games in 1920 and twice led the National League in ERA in 1914 and 1921.
- November 27 – Nick Maddox, 68, pitcher who posted a 43-20 record and 2.29 earned run average from 1907 to 1910 for the Pittsburgh Pirates, who threw a two-hit, 14-strikeout 4–0 shutout in his debut against the St. Louis Cardinals, and later in the season hurled a 2–1 no-hitter against the Brooklyn Superbas, becoming the youngest pitcher ever to throw a no-hitter in Major League history at the age of 20 years and ten months, which was also the first no-hit game ever thrown by a Pittsburgh Pirates pitcher.
- November 29 – Al Lawson, 85, pitcher for the Boston Beaneaters and Pittsburgh Alleghenys during the 1890 season, who later went on to play a pioneering role in the U.S. aircraft industry.

=== December ===
- December 1 – Kid O'Hara, 78, outfielder for the Boston Beaneaters in the 1904 season.
- December 4 – Tony Madigan, 86, pitcher for the 1886 Washington Nationals of the National League.
- December 5 – Russ Christopher, 37, pitcher who played from 1942 through 1948 with the Philadelphia Athletics and Cleveland Indians, including the 1948 World Champion Indians.
- December 9 – Bill McGowan, 58, Hall of Fame American League umpire who officiated in 4,425 league games (April 14, 1925 to July 27, 1954), and worked in eight World Series and four All-Star games; did not miss a single inning over 2,541 consecutive games umpired between 1925 and 1942.
- December 11 – Harry Courtney, 56, who pitched from 1919 to 1922 for the Washington Senators and Chicago White Sox.
- December 17 – Red Proctor, 54, pitcher who saw action in two games with the Chicago White Sox in 1923.
- December 19 – Big Jeff Pfeffer, 72, National League pitcher for the Chicago Cubs and the Boston Beaneaters/Doves/Rustlers teams, who pitched his way into baseball history by throwing a no-hitter against the Cincinnati Reds on May 8, 1907.
- December 31 – Tom Raftery, 73, outfielder who appeared in eight games for the Cleveland Naps in the 1909 season.
