= 1981 Texas Rangers season =

1981 Texas Rangers
- League: American League
- Division: West
- Ballpark: Arlington Stadium
- City: Arlington, Texas
- Record: 57–48 (.543)
- Divisional place: 2nd
- Owner: Eddie Chiles
- General managers: Eddie Robinson
- Managers: Don Zimmer
- Television: KXAS-TV (Eric Nadel, Mel Proctor); Vue-Pay (Mark Holtz, Norm Hitzges)
- Radio: WBAP (Eric Nadel, Bill Merrill, Mel Proctor)

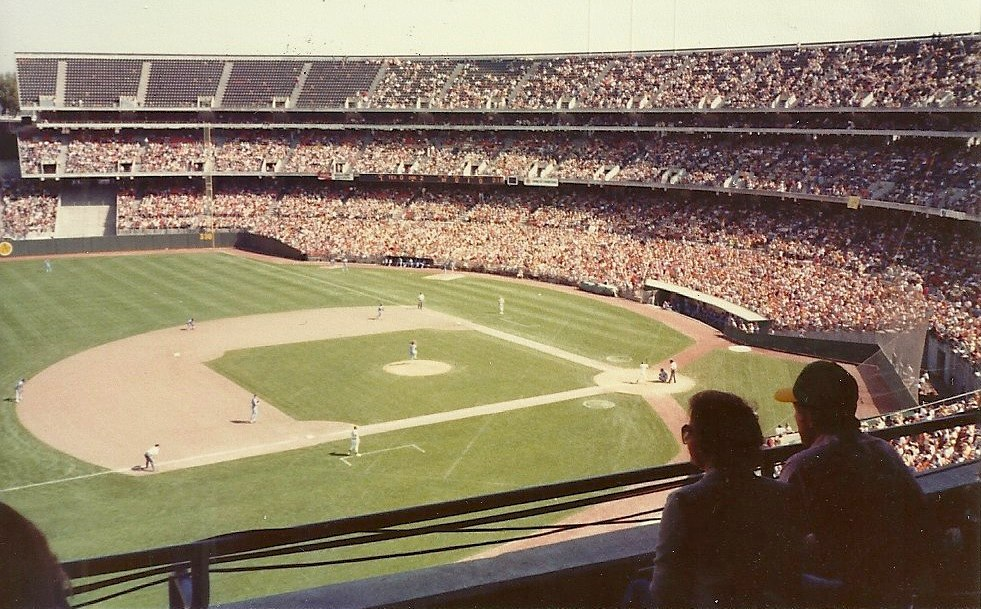
The Rangers playing against the Oakland Athletics during a 1981 away game at Oakland–Alameda County Coliseum.

The 1981 Texas Rangers season was the 21st of the Texas Rangers franchise overall, their 10th in Arlington as the Rangers, and the 10th season at Arlington Stadium. The Rangers finished second in the American League West with a record of 57 wins and 48 losses. The season was suspended for 50 days due to the infamous 1981 players strike and the league chose as its playoff teams, the division winners from the first and second halves of the season, respectively.

== Offseason ==
- December 12, 1980: Richie Zisk, Rick Auerbach, Ken Clay, Jerry Don Gleaton, Brian Allard, and Steve Finch (minors) were traded by the Rangers to the Seattle Mariners for Willie Horton, Larry Cox, Rick Honeycutt, Mario Mendoza, and Leon Roberts.
- December 18, 1980: Bob Jones was signed as a free agent by the Rangers.

== Regular season ==
=== Season standings ===
AL West
Team	W	L	Pct.	GB	Home	Road
Oakland Athletics	64	45	.587	—	35‍–‍21	29‍–‍24
Texas Rangers	57	48	.543	5	32‍–‍24	25‍–‍24
Chicago White Sox	54	52	.509	8½	25‍–‍24	29‍–‍28
Kansas City Royals	50	53	.485	11	19‍–‍28	31‍–‍25
California Angels	51	59	.464	13½	26‍–‍28	25‍–‍31
Seattle Mariners	44	65	.404	20	20‍–‍37	24‍–‍28
Minnesota Twins	41	68	.376	23	24‍–‍36	17‍–‍32

AL West First Half Standings	W	L	Pct.	GB
Oakland Athletics	37	23	.617	—
Texas Rangers	33	22	.600	1 1/2
Chicago White Sox	31	22	.585	2 1/2
California Angels	31	29	.517	6
Kansas City Royals	20	30	.400	12
Seattle Mariners	21	36	.368	14 1/2
Minnesota Twins	17	39	.304	18

AL West Second Half Standings	W	L	Pct.	GB
Kansas City Royals	30	23	.566	—
Oakland Athletics	27	22	.551	1
Texas Rangers	24	26	.480	4 1/2
Minnesota Twins	24	29	.453	6
Seattle Mariners	23	29	.442	6 1/2
Chicago White Sox	23	30	.434	7
California Angels	20	30	.400	8 1/2

=== Record vs. opponents ===
1981 American League record Sources:
Team	BAL	BOS	CAL	CWS	CLE	DET	KC	MIL	MIN	NYY	OAK	SEA	TEX	TOR
Baltimore	—	2–2	6–6	3–6	4–2	6–7	5–3	2–4	6–0	7–6	7–5	4–2	2–1	5–2
Boston	2–2	—	2–4	5–4	7–6	6–1	3–3	6–7	2–5	3–3	7–5	9–3	3–6	4–0
California	6–6	4–2	—	6–7	7–5	3–3	0–6	4–3	3–3	2–2	2–8	6–4	2–4	6–6
Chicago	6–3	4–5	7–6	—	2–5	3–3	2–0	4–1	2–4	5–7	7–6	3–3	2–4	7–5
Cleveland	2–4	6–7	5–7	5–2	—	1–5	4–4	3–6	2–1	7–5	3–2	8–4	2–2	4–2
Detroit	7–6	1–6	3–3	3–3	5–1	—	3–2	5–8	9–3	3–7	1–2	5–1	9–3	6–4
Kansas City	3–5	3–3	6–0	0–2	4–4	2–3	—	4–5	9–4	2–10	3–3	6–7	3–4	5–3
Milwaukee	4–2	7–6	3–4	1–4	6–3	8–5	5–4	—	9–3	3–3	4–2	2–2	4–5	6–4
Minnesota	0–6	5–2	3–3	4–2	1–2	3–9	4–9	3–9	—	3–3	2–8	3–6–1	5–8	5–1
New York	6–7	3–3	2–2	7–5	5–7	7–3	10–2	3–3	3–3	—	4–3	2–3	5–4	2–3
Oakland	5–7	5–7	8–2	6–7	2–3	2–1	3–3	2–4	8–2	3–4	—	6–1	4–2	10–2
Seattle	2–4	3–9	4–6	3–3	4–8	1–5	7–6	2–2	6–3–1	3–2	1–6	—	5–8	3–3
Texas	1–2	6–3	4–2	4–2	2–2	3–9	4–3	5–4	8–5	4–5	2–4	8–5	—	6–2
Toronto	2–5	0–4	6–6	5–7	2–4	4–6	3–5	4–6	1–5	3–2	2–10	3–3	2–6	—

=== Notable transactions ===
- April 1, 1981: Willie Horton was released by the Rangers.
- June 8, 1981: Ron Darling was drafted by the Rangers in the 1st round (9th pick) of the 1981 Major League Baseball draft.

=== Roster ===
1981 Texas Rangers roster
Roster
Pitchers: 46 Bob Babcock; 29 John Butcher; 11 Steve Comer; 44 Danny Darwin; 40 Rick Honeycutt; 49 Charlie Hough; 31 Ferguson Jenkins; 38 John Henry Johnson; 34 Jim Kern; 35 Bob Lacey; 32 Jon Matlack; 33 Doc Medich; 53 Mark Mercer; 24 Dave Schmidt; 12 Len Whitehouse	Catchers: 20 Larry Cox; 8 Bob Johnson; 10 Jim Sundberg; Infielders: 25 Buddy Bell; 9 John Ellis; 14 Mario Mendoza; 4 Nelson Norman; 18 Pat Putnam; 13 Bill Stein; 3 Wayne Tolleson; 30 Mark Wagner; 1 Bump Wills	Outfielders: 21 Dan Duran; 6 Johnny Grubb; 27 Bobby Jones; 15 Rick Lisi; 16 Tom Poquette; 17 Mickey Rivers; 7,16 Leon Roberts; 5 Billy Sample; Other batters: 0 Al Oliver; 20 Don Werner	Manager: 23 Don Zimmer; Coaches: 41 Jackie Brown; 37 Tommy Helms; 22 Darrell Johnson; 47 Fred Koenig; 42 Wayne Terwilliger

== Player stats ==
= Indicates team leader

=== Batting ===
==== Starters by position ====
Note: Pos = Position; G = Games played; AB = At bats; H = Hits; Avg. = Batting average; HR = Home runs; RBI = Runs batted in

Pos	Player	G	AB	H	Avg.	HR	RBI
C	Jim Sundberg	102	339	94	.277	3	28
1B	Pat Putnam	95	297	79	.266	8	35
2B	Bump Wills	102	410	103	.251	2	41
SS	Mario Mendoza	88	229	53	.231	0	22
3B	Buddy Bell	97	360	106	.294	10	64
LF	Billy Sample	66	230	65	.283	3	25
CF	Mickey Rivers	99	399	114	.286	3	26
RF	Johnny Grubb	67	199	46	.231	3	26
DH	Al Oliver	102	421	130	.309	4	55

==== Other batters ====
Note: G = Games played; AB = At bats; H = Hits; Avg. = Batting average; HR = Home runs; RBI = Runs batted in

Player	G	AB	H	Avg.	HR	RBI
Leon Roberts	72	233	65	.279	4	31
Bill Stein	53	115	38	.330	2	22
Mark Wagner	50	85	22	.259	1	14
Tom Poquette	30	64	10	.156	0	7
John Ellis	23	58	8	.138	1	7
Bobby Jones	10	34	9	.265	3	7
Wayne Tolleson	14	24	4	.167	0	1
Bob Johnson	6	18	5	.278	2	4
Rick Lisi	9	16	5	.313	0	1
Dan Duran	13	16	4	.250	0	0
Larry Cox	5	13	3	.231	0	1
Nelson Norman	7	13	3	.231	0	2
Don Werner	2	8	2	.250	0	0

=== Pitching ===
==== Starting pitchers ====
Note: G = Games pitched; IP = Innings pitched; W = Wins; L = Losses; ERA = Earned run average; SO = Strikeouts

Player	G	IP	W	L	ERA	SO
Danny Darwin	22	146.0	9	9	3.64	98
Doc Medich	20	143.1	10	6	3.08	65
Rick Honeycutt	20	127.2	11	6	3.31	40
Fergie Jenkins	19	106.0	5	8	4.50	63
Jon Matlack	17	104.1	4	7	4.14	43

==== Other pitchers ====
Note: G = Games pitched; IP = Innings pitched; W = Wins; L = Losses; ERA = Earned run average; SO = Strikeouts

Player	G	IP	W	L	ERA	SO
Charlie Hough	21	82.0	4	1	2.96	69
John Butcher	5	27.2	1	2	1.63	19
Len Whitehouse	2	3.1	0	1	16.20	2

==== Relief pitchers ====
Note: G = Games pitched; W = Wins; L = Losses; SV = Saves; ERA = Earned run average; SO = Strikeouts

Player	G	W	L	SV	ERA	SO
Steve Comer	36	8	2	6	2.56	22
John Henry Johnson	24	3	1	2	2.66	8
Jim Kern	23	1	2	6	2.70	20
Bob Babcock	16	1	1	0	2.20	18
Dave Scmiidt	14	0	1	1	3.13	13
Mark Mercer	7	0	1	2	4.70	8
Bob Lacey	1	0	0	0	9.00	0

== Awards and honors ==
- Buddy Bell, 3B, Gold Glove 1981
- Al Oliver, Silver Slugger Award, 1981
- Jim Sundberg, C, Gold Glove, 1981

All-Star Game

== Farm system ==
Level	Team	League	Manager
AAA	Wichita Aeros	American Association	Rich Donnelly
AA	Tulsa Drillers	Texas League	Tom Burgess
A	Asheville Tourists	South Atlantic League	Tom Robson
Rookie	GCL Rangers	Gulf Coast League	Andy Hancock
