= Dan Duran =

Dan Duran may refer to:

- Dan Duran (baseball) (born 1954), American baseball player
- Dan Duran (broadcaster), Canadian broadcaster and actor
- Dan Duran (filmmaker) (born 1990), American documentary filmmaker and producer
