= Bergholz, Ohio =

- Village
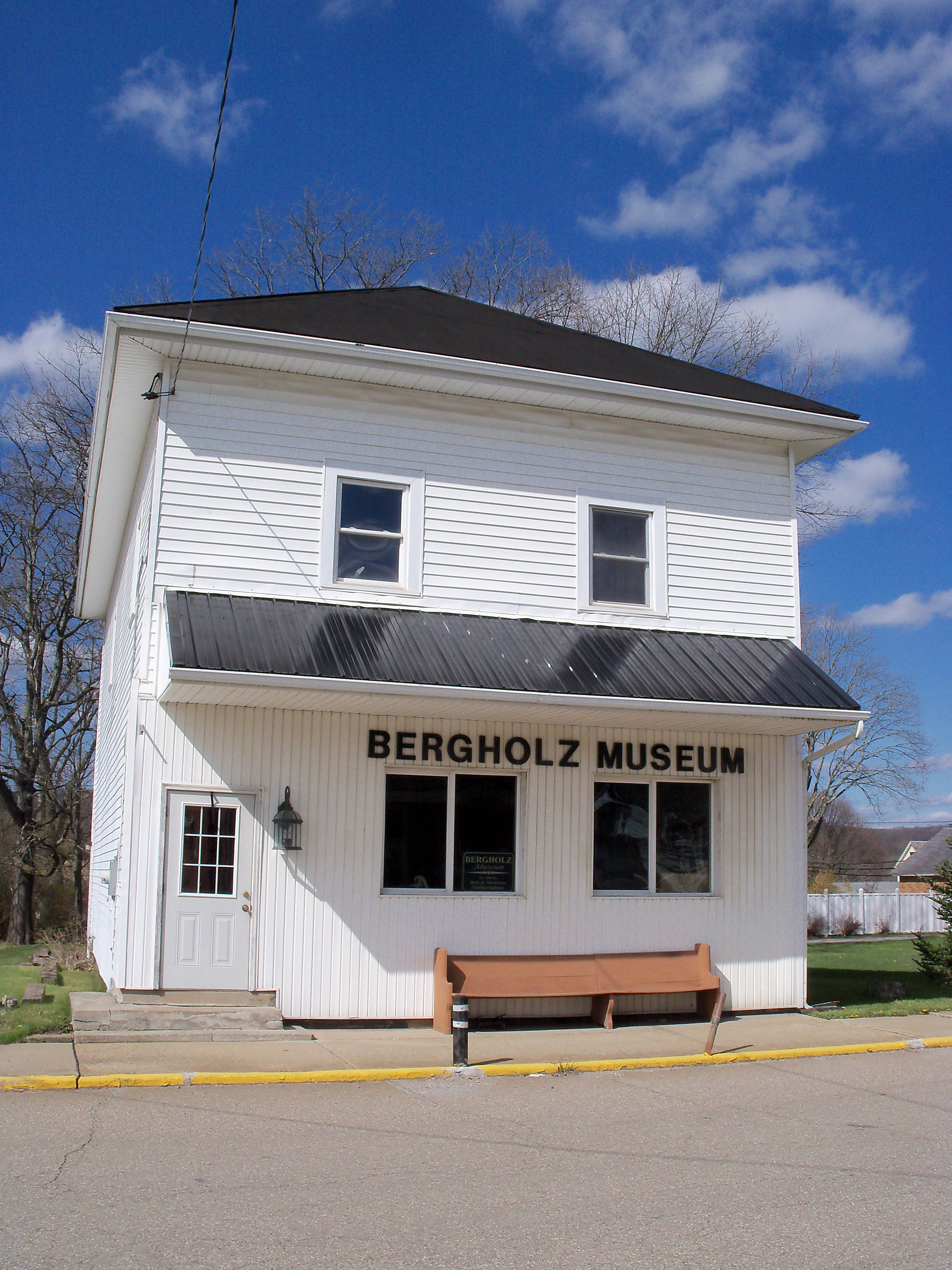
- Bergholz Museum

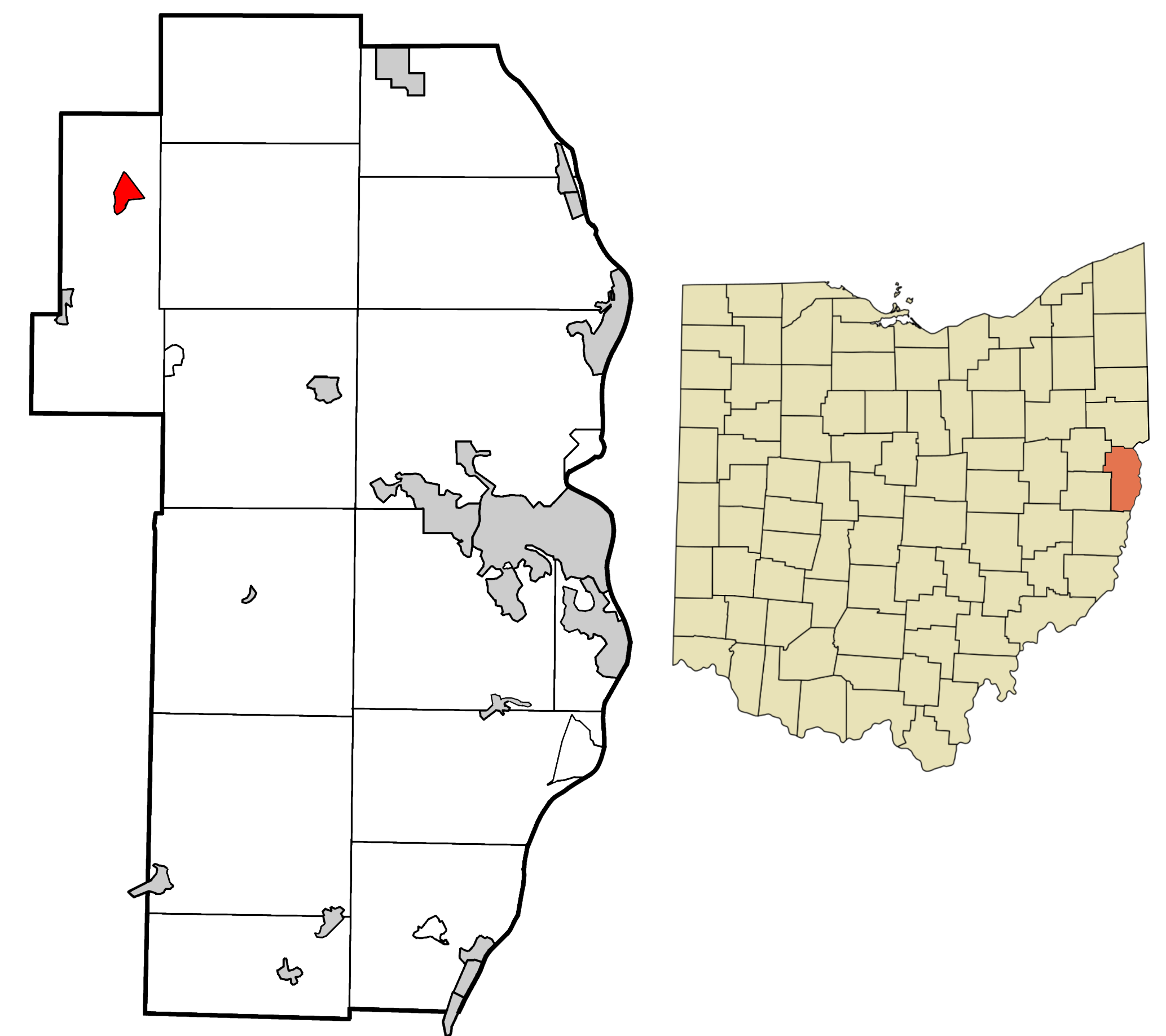
- Location of Bergholz in Jefferson County, Ohio

- Location within Ohio Location within the United States
- Coordinates: 40°31′11″N 80°52′50″W
- Country: United States
- State: Ohio
- County: Jefferson
- Township: Springfield

Area
  - Total: 0.56 sq mi (1.46 km^{2})
  - Land: 0.56 sq mi (1.46 km^{2})
  - Water: 0 sq mi (0.00 km^{2})
- Elevation: 909 ft (277 m)

Population (2020)
  - Total: 544
  - Estimate (2023): 529
  - Density: 965.5/sq mi (372.77/km^{2})
- Time zone: UTC-5 (Eastern (EST))
  - Summer (DST): UTC-4 (EDT)
- ZIP code: 43908
- Area code: 740
- FIPS code: 39-05718
- GNIS feature ID: 2398100

Bergholz (/ˈbɜːrɡhoʊlz/ BURG-holes) is a village in Jefferson County, Ohio, United States. The population was 544 at the 2020 census. The village's name is German and translates to "mountain timber". It is part of the Weirton–Steubenville metropolitan area.

== History ==
Initially, the Bergholz area was a settlement called Nebo. Modern Bergholz had its start in 1883 when the railroad was built through that territory in order to access a mine. The settlement was named Bergholz in honor of one of the mine owners. It was incorporated as a village in 1906.

Confederate general John Hunt Morgan traveled through Bergholz during the 1863 Morgan's Raid on his way to defeat at the Battle of Salineville in the American Civil War.

In September 2012, a group of 16 Amish men and women from the Bergholz Community were convicted of federal hate-crime and conspiracy charges after five hair- and beard-cutting incidents. Samuel Mullet Sr., who did not participate in the five hair- and beard-cutting attacks, was tried as the leader of the campaign. Initially Samuel Mullet Sr. was sentenced to 15 years in prison on February 8, 2013, with fifteen others receiving lighter sentences ranging from one year and one day to seven years; after these convictions were overturned in August 2014 by the United States Court of Appeals for the Sixth Circuit, these sentences were reduced in March 2015.

Due to the cloistered nature of Amish lifestyle, they are often reluctant to bring complaints to local police who describe the attacks as "very rare".

== Geography ==
According to the United States Census Bureau, the village has a total area of 0.56 square miles (1.45 km^{2}), all land.

== Demographics ==
Historical population
Census	Pop.	Note	%±
1910	1,011		—
1920	1,215		20.2%
1930	918		−24.4%
1940	1,122		22.2%
1950	1,035		−7.8%
1960	955		−7.7%
1970	914		−4.3%
1980	914		0.0%
1990	713		−22.0%
2000	769		7.9%
2010	664		−13.7%
2020	544		−18.1%
2023 (est.)	529	▼	−2.8%
U.S. Decennial Census

=== 2010 census ===
As of the census of 2010, there were 664 people, 266 households, and 174 families living in the village. The population density was 1,185.7 inhabitants per square mile (457.8/km^{2}). There were 319 housing units at an average density of 569.6 per square mile (219.9/km^{2}). The racial makeup of the village was 98.2% White, 0.8% African American, 0.3% Native American, 0.2% Asian, and 0.6% from two or more races. Hispanic or Latino of any race were 0.2% of the population.

There were 266 households, of which 34.2% had children under the age of 18 living with them, 45.5% were married couples living together, 12.4% had a female householder with no husband present, 7.5% had a male householder with no wife present, and 34.6% were non-families. 30.1% of all households were made up of individuals, and 15.8% had someone living alone who was 65 years of age or older. The average household size was 2.50 and the average family size was 2.99.

The median age in the village was 38.3 years. 24.2% of residents were under the age of 18; 9.1% were between the ages of 18 and 24; 27.7% were from 25 to 44; 24.9% were from 45 to 64; and 14% were 65 years of age or older. The gender makeup of the village was 47.7% male and 52.3% female.

=== 2000 census ===
As of the census of 2000, there were 769 people, 293 households, and 201 families living in the village. The population density was 1,383.7 inhabitants per square mile (534.2/km^{2}). There were 317 housing units at an average density of 570.4 per square mile (220.2/km^{2}). The racial makeup of the village was 98.44% White, 0.52% African American, 0.65% Native American, 0.13% Asian, 0.13% Pacific Islander, and 0.13% from two or more races. Hispanic or Latino of any race were 0.13% of the population.

There were 293 households, out of which 34.8% had children under the age of 18 living with them, 49.8% were married couples living together, 12.6% had a female householder with no husband present, and 31.1% were non-families. 25.6% of all households were made up of individuals, and 14.7% had someone living alone who was 65 years of age or older. The average household size was 2.55 and the average family size was 3.04.

In the village, the population was spread out, with 24.7% under the age of 18, 9.2% from 18 to 24, 27.6% from 25 to 44, 20.9% from 45 to 64, and 17.6% who were 65 years of age or older. The median age was 37 years. For every 100 females there were 92.7 males. For every 100 females age 18 and over, there were 88.0 males.

The median income for a household in the village was $33,438, and the median income for a family was $43,542. Males had a median income of $36,938 versus $17,708 for females. The per capita income for the village was $14,986. About 9.5% of families and 16.2% of the population were below the poverty line, including 24.0% of those under age 18 and 12.1% of those age 65 or over.

== Education ==
Public education in the village of Bergholz is provided by the Edison Local School District. Campuses serving the village include:

- John Gregg Elementary School – grades K-6
- Edison High School – grades 7-12

== Notable people ==
- Ray Grimes, Major League Baseball first baseman who played for the Boston Red Sox, Chicago Cubs, and Philadelphia Phillies
- Roy Grimes, Major League Baseball second baseman who played for the New York Giants

== See also ==
- Bergholz Community
