= Billy Klaus =

American baseball player (1928–2006)

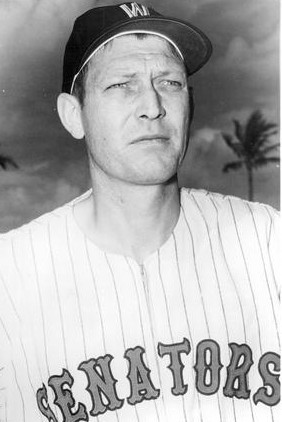
- Shortstop / Third baseman
- Born: December 9, 1928; Spring Grove, Illinois, U.S.
- Died: December 3, 2006 (aged 77); Sarasota, Florida, U.S.
- Batted: Left Threw: Right

MLB debut
- April 16, 1952, for the Boston Braves

Last MLB appearance
- May 12, 1963, for the Philadelphia Phillies

MLB statistics
- Batting average: .249
- Home runs: 40
- Runs batted in: 250

NPB statistics
- Batting average: .257
- Home runs: 3
- Runs batted in: 22
- Stats at Baseball Reference

Teams
- Boston / Milwaukee Braves (1952–1953); Boston Red Sox (1955–1958); Baltimore Orioles (1959–1960); Washington Senators (1961); Philadelphia Phillies (1962–1963); Chunichi Dragons (1963)

William Joseph Klaus (December 9, 1928 – December 3, 2006) was an American professional baseball shortstop and third baseman, who played in Major League Baseball (MLB) with the Boston / Milwaukee Braves (1952–1953), Boston Red Sox (1955–1958), Baltimore Orioles (1959–1960), Washington Senators (1961), and Philadelphia Phillies (1962–1963). He played the end of the 1963 season playing for the Chunichi Dragons of Nippon Professional Baseball (NPB). Klaus batted left-handed and threw right-handed, and was listed as 5 feet 9 inches (1.75 m) tall and 160 pounds (73 kg), during his playing days.

Born in Spring Grove, Illinois, Klaus attended Grant Community High School in Fox Lake, Illinois. One of four children, his family lived on a dairy farm and at one point he had to leave high school in order to help on the farm while his father was ill. Klaus was the older brother of MLB infielder Bobby Klaus, who played for the Cincinnati Reds and New York Mets in 1964–1965.

After nine games played and seven at bats without a hit during brief trials for the 1952–53 Braves, Klaus was included in one of the most important trades of the early 1950s, when Milwaukee sent him to the New York Giants on February 1, 1954, with pitchers Johnny Antonelli and Don Liddle and catcher Ebba St. Claire (plus US$50,000) for erstwhile Giants' hero Bobby Thomson and catcher Sam Calderone. The deal came out heavily in the Giants' favor, with Antonelli pitching them to the 1954 National League (NL) pennant and world championship. Thomson, meanwhile, broke his ankle and was able to play in only 43 games that season. Klaus never appeared in a Giants' uniform; he was the all-star shortstop in the Triple-A American Association (as a Minneapolis Miller), hitting 21 home runs (HR), and was acquired by the Red Sox during the 1954–55 offseason.

In his 1955 rookie season with the BoSox, Klaus had a career-high .283 batting average, with seven HR, and 60 runs batted in (RBI) (another career-high), and finished second place in American League Rookie of the Year voting behind Herb Score. "On February 2, 1956, Klaus was awarded the first annual Harry Agganis Memorial Award by the Boston baseball writers as the Red Sox Rookie of the Year. ... Ted Williams sent a telegram from his home in Florida, congratulating Klaus and articulating his value to the team as only Ted could put it: “Billy Klaus was one of the greatest little competitors I ever played with.”" A year later, he posted almost identical numbers (.271/7/59), and in 1957 he belted a high-career 10 homers.

In an 11-season MLB career, Klaus was a .249 lifetime hitter, with 40 HR, and 250 RBI, in 821 games played. He totaled 626 hits.

After his active career, Klaus managed Minor League Baseball (MiLB) affiliates of the Senators and Oakland Athletics. When he finally left baseball completely, he worked as a painter and lived in both Sarasota Florida and North Carolina.

Klaus was inducted into the Lake County High School Sports Hall of Fame in 2001.
