= Bergholz Community =

Former radical Amish group

The Bergholz Community, also called Bergholz Clan or Bergholz Amish, is a religious group of former Amish under the leadership of Sam Mullet, formed in 1995 and located at Bergholz, Ohio, that became known for a series of "beard cutting" attacks on members of an Amish community in 2011.

== History ==
In 1995, a new Amish settlement was founded in Bergholz, Ohio, on the initiative of Sam Mullet, who wanted to create a settlement more conservative than the very conservative Amish settlement he was residing in at the time. In 1997, Mullet was ordained minister for the new settlement and in 2001, he was ordained bishop in an unusual form. Amish tradition requires that at least three bishops take part in the ordination ceremony of a new bishop, but in Mullet's case, there was only one other bishop present. In early 2006, Mullet excommunicated the deacon of the community and soon after, nine families (more than a third of the Bergholz Amish population) left the settlement. These families were subsequently excommunicated by Mullet. This excommunication meant that the families were no longer allowed to join other conservative settlements as many conservative affiliations of the Amish practice "strict shunning" (German: strenge Meidung), which requires that the person who is excommunicated must return to their former bishop and confess their sins to be able to join another strict shunning community. As such, many of the families that were driven out by Mullet felt that the ban was not just.

At a June 2006 meeting in Pennsylvania, many Amish bishops also expressed that they felt that the ban of so many families from Bergholz should not be applied according to tradition. A committee of five bishops was formed to examine the case and look for a solution, but no agreement could be found with Mullet. A second impartial committee of seven bishops was also unsuccessful. In the end, three hundred Amish ministers at a September 2006 meeting in Ulysses, Pennsylvania, decided that, in the case of Sam Mullet, the traditional rule could not be applied and the excommunicated members were free to join other "strict shunning" Amish groups.

== Beard cutting attacks ==
There were altogether five beard cutting attacks committed by members of the Bergholz Community. The first took place on September 6, 2011, and the last on November 9, 2011. The victims were mostly Amish relatives of the people from Bergholz, who had either left the Bergholz community or openly opposed it. Raymond Hershberger, a bishop who was not related to the Bergholz Community but opposed them, was also victim of a beard cutting attack.

=== The trial ===
In September 2012, a group of 16 Amish men and women from Bergholz, Ohio, were convicted on federal hate crime and conspiracy charges, including Samuel Mullet, who did not participate in the five hair- and beard-cutting attacks but was tried as the leader of the campaign. Initially Samuel Mullet was sentenced to 15 years in prison on February 8, 2013, with fifteen others receiving lighter sentences ranging from one year and one day to seven years; after these convictions were overturned in August 2014 by the United States Court of Appeals for the Sixth Circuit, the sentences were reduced in March 2015.

Due to the cloistered nature of Amish lifestyle, they are often reluctant to bring complaints to local police who describe the attacks as "very rare".

== Irregular practices ==
On the question if the Bergholz Community is Amish, Donald A. Kraybill reports that some of the members consider themselves Amish while others do not. Kraybill also states that there are 25 practices in the Bergholz Community that are irregular compared to general Old Order Amish practice, including:

- Rejecting Christian identity
- Terminating Sunday worship services
- Rejecting the core Amish values of humility, nonviolence, forgiveness
- Using the Old Testament as a primary source of authority
- Rejecting fellowship with Amish affiliations
- Accepting sexual misconduct
- Permitting ordained officials to speak on television

== Literature ==
- Donald A. Kraybill: Renegade Amish: Beard Cutting, Hate Crimes, and the Trial of the Bergholz Barbers. Johns Hopkins University Press. Baltimore 2014
