= Sam Calderone =

American baseball player

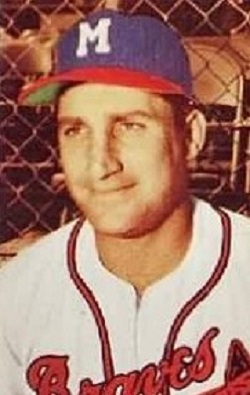
- Catcher
- Born: February 6, 1926; Beverly, New Jersey, U.S.
- Died: November 28, 2006 (aged 80); Mount Holly, New Jersey, U.S.
- Batted: Right Threw: Right

MLB debut
- April 19, 1950, for the New York Giants

Last MLB appearance
- September 26, 1954, for the Milwaukee Braves

MLB statistics
- Batting average: .291
- Home runs: 1
- Runs batted in: 25
- Stats at Baseball Reference

Teams
- New York Giants (1950; 1953); Milwaukee Braves (1954)

Samuel Francis Calderone (February 6, 1926 – November 28, 2006) was an American professional baseball catcher who spent three seasons (1950; 1953–1954) in Major League Baseball as a member of the New York Giants and Milwaukee Braves. Calderone threw and batted right-handed, stood 5 feet 10 inches (1.78 m) tall and weighed 185 pounds (84 kg).

Born in Beverly, New Jersey, Calderone played baseball, football and golf at Burlington City High School.

Calderone first signed with the Giants' archrivals, the Brooklyn Dodgers, in 1945 but could not make the Major League team, despite batting .317, .293 and .316 in successive minor league seasons. He was selected by New York in the 1949 Rule 5 draft and spent the 1950 season as the backup to regular Giant catcher Wes Westrum, batting .299 in 34 games and 67 at bats. He served in the United States Army during the Korean War and lost the 1951–1952 seasons to military service. One of his teammates on the 1951 Fort Myer, Virginia, Army team was Boston Braves southpaw pitcher Johnny Antonelli, and a year after Calderone returned to baseball, he and Antonelli would figure in a major trade between the Giants and the Milwaukee Braves prior to the 1954 season. In the deal, the Giants' 1951 hero Bobby Thomson and Calderone were swapped to Milwaukee for Antonelli, pitcher Don Liddle, catcher Ebba St. Claire, infielder Billy Klaus and $50,000. Antonelli would help lead the 1954 Giants to the world championship, going 21–7, leading the National League in earned run average, and picking up a win and a save against the Cleveland Indians in the Giants' World Series sweep.

Calderone, meanwhile, served as the Braves' third-string receiver that season and batted only 29 times, although he rang up 11 hits for a .379 average. He was sent to the Pacific Coast League for 1955 and finished his playing career in Triple-A in 1958. He managed in the Giants' minor league system briefly before leaving baseball. All told, Calderone appeared in 91 Major League games, batting 141 times with 41 hits.

Sam Calderone died at age 80 in Mount Holly, New Jersey.
