= List of Major League Baseball individual streaks =

The following is a list of notable individual player streaks achieved in Major League Baseball.

== Hitting ==
=== Consecutive game records ===
Consecutive games with a hit

- 56 – Joe DiMaggio, New York Yankees – May 15 through July 16, 1941

Consecutive games with a home run

- 8 (3 tied)
  - Dale Long, Pittsburgh Pirates – May 19 through May 28, 1956
  - Don Mattingly, New York Yankees – July 8 through July 18, 1987
  - Ken Griffey Jr., Seattle Mariners – July 20 through July 28, 1993

Consecutive games reaching base

- 84 – Ted Williams, Boston Red Sox – July 1 through September 27, 1949

Consecutive games without a strikeout

- 115 – Joe Sewell, Cleveland Indians – May 17 through September 19, 1929

Consecutive games with a strikeout

- 37 – Aaron Judge, New York Yankees – July 8 through August 21, 2017

Consecutive games with two or more hits

- 15 – Count Campau, St. Louis Browns – July 5 through July 23, 1890

Consecutive games with three or more hits

- 6 (3 tied)
  - Sam Thompson, Philadelphia Phillies – June 11 through 21, 1895
  - Jimmy Johnston, Brooklyn Dodgers – June 24 through June 30, 1923
  - George Brett, Kansas City Royals – May 8 through 13, 1976

Consecutive games with an RBI

- 17 – Ray Grimes, Chicago Cubs – June 27 through July 23, 1922

Consecutive games scoring one or more runs

- 24 – Billy Hamilton, Philadelphia Phillies – July 6 through August 2, 1894

Consecutive games with a walk

- 22 – Roy Cullenbine, Detroit Tigers – July 2 through July 22, 1947

Consecutive games with a double

- 9 – Bo Bichette, Toronto Blue Jays – July 31 through August 8, 2019

Consecutive games with a triple

- 5 (2 tied)
  - Harry Davis, Pittsburgh Pirates – July 29 through August 3, 1897
  - Chief Wilson, Pittsburgh Pirates – June 17 through July 20, 1912

Consecutive pinch-hit appearances with a home run

- 3 (2 tied)
  - Lee Lacy, Los Angeles Dodgers – May 2, 6, and 17, 1978
  - Del Unser, Philadelphia Phillies – June 30, July 5 and 10, 1979

=== Consecutive plate appearance records ===
Consecutive plate appearances reaching base (unofficial) (includes all possible ways of reaching base: base hit, walk, hit-by-pitch, error, fielder's choice, dropped third strike, catcher's interference and fielder's obstruction)

- 17 – Earl Averill Jr., Los Angeles Angels – June 3 through June 10 (first game), 1962 (7 hits, 8 walks, 1 error, 1 fielder's choice)

Consecutive plate appearances reaching base (official) (includes all possible ways of reaching base which raise a batter's OBP: base hit, walk, hit-by-pitch)

- 17 – Piggy Ward, Baltimore Orioles/Cincinnati Reds – June 16 through June 19, 1893 (8 hits, 8 walks, 1 hit-by-pitch)

Consecutive plate appearances with a hit

- 12 (4 tied)
  - Johnny Kling, Chicago Cubs – August 24 through 28, 1902
  - Walt Dropo, Detroit Tigers – July 14 and 15, 1952
  - José Miranda, Minnesota Twins – July 3 through 6, 2024
  - Tyler Tolbert, Kansas City Royals - July 4, 6, and 7, 2026

Consecutive plate appearances with a walk

- 7 (5 tied)
  - Billy Rogell, Detroit Tigers – August 17 through 19, 1938
  - Mel Ott, New York Giants – June 16 through 18, 1943
  - Eddie Stanky, New York Giants – August 29 and 30, 1950
  - José Canseco, Oakland Athletics – August 4 and 5, 1992
  - Barry Bonds, San Francisco Giants – September 24 through 26, 2004

=== Consecutive season records ===
Consecutive seasons hitting .300 or better (50 or more games)

- 23 – Ty Cobb, Detroit Tigers – 1906–1928

Consecutive seasons, 100 or more RBI

- 13 (3 tied)
  - Lou Gehrig, New York Yankees – 1926–1938
  - Jimmie Foxx, Philadelphia A's and Boston Red Sox – 1929–1941
  - Alex Rodriguez, Seattle Mariners, Texas Rangers and New York Yankees – 1998–2010

Consecutive seasons with 200 or more hits

- 10 – Ichiro Suzuki, Seattle Mariners – 2001–2010

Consecutive seasons with 150 or more hits

- 17 (2 tied)
  - Hank Aaron, Milwaukee and Atlanta Braves – 1955–1971
  - Derek Jeter, New York Yankees – 1996–2012

Consecutive seasons with 100 or more runs scored

- 13 (3 tied)
  - Lou Gehrig, New York Yankees – 1926–1938
  - Hank Aaron, Milwaukee and Atlanta Braves – 1955–1967
  - Alex Rodriguez, Seattle Mariners, Texas Rangers and New York Yankees – 1996–2008

Consecutive seasons with 50 or more home runs

- 4 - Mark McGwire, Oakland Athletics and St. Louis Cardinals - 1996–1999
- 4 - Sammy Sosa, Chicago Cubs - 1998–2001

Consecutive seasons with 40 or more home runs

- 7 – Babe Ruth, New York Yankees – 1926–1932

Consecutive seasons with 30 or more home runs

- 13 (2 tied)
  - Barry Bonds, Pittsburgh Pirates and San Francisco Giants – 1992–2004
  - Alex Rodriguez, Seattle Mariners, Texas Rangers and New York Yankees – 1998–2010

Consecutive seasons with 40 or more doubles

- 7 – Joe Medwick, St. Louis Cardinals – 1933–1939

Consecutive seasons with 20 or more triples

- 3 – Sam Crawford, Detroit Tigers - 1912–1914

Consecutive seasons with 100 or more walks

- 8 (2 tied)
  - Frank Thomas, Chicago White Sox – 1991 through 1998
  - Bobby Abreu, Philadelphia Phillies and New York Yankees – 1999–2006

Consecutive seasons with 600 or more at-bats

- 13 – Pete Rose, Cincinnati Reds and Philadelphia Phillies – 1968–1980

Consecutive seasons, .400 on-base percentage or better

- 17 – Ted Williams, Boston Red Sox – 1939–1958

Consecutive seasons, .600 slugging percentage or better (50 or more games)

- 7 – Barry Bonds, San Francisco Giants – 1998–2004
- 7 – Babe Ruth, New York Yankees – 1926–1932

== Baserunning ==
Consecutive stolen bases without being caught stealing

- 50 – Vince Coleman, St. Louis Cardinals – September 18, 1988 – July 26, 1989

Consecutive games with a stolen base

- 12 – Bert Campaneris, Oakland Athletics – June 10, 1969 – June 21, 1969

Consecutive seasons, 100 or more stolen bases

- 3 – Vince Coleman, St. Louis Cardinals – 1985–1987

Consecutive seasons, 50 or more stolen bases

- 12 – Lou Brock, St. Louis Cardinals – 1965–1976

Consecutive seasons, 40 or more stolen bases

- 14 – Rickey Henderson, Oakland Athletics, New York Yankees, and Toronto Blue Jays – 1980–1993

== Pitching ==
=== Consecutive game records ===
Consecutive games won

- 24 – Carl Hubbell, New York Giants – July 18, 1936 – May 27, 1937 (record set over two seasons)

Consecutive games won within a single season

- 19 (2 tied)
  - Tim Keefe, New York Giants – June 23 – August 10, 1888
  - Rube Marquard, New York Giants – April 11 – July 3, 1912 (streak began on Opening Day)

Consecutive complete games (since 1900)

- 39 – Jack Taylor, St. Louis Cardinals – April 15 – October 6, 1904

Consecutive games without being relieved

- 202 – Jack Taylor, Chicago Cubs and St. Louis Cardinals – June 20, 1901 – August 13, 1906 (187 starts, all complete games, and 15 relief appearances)

Consecutive shutouts

- 6 – Don Drysdale, Los Angeles Dodgers – May 14 – June 4, 1968

Consecutive no-hit games

- 2 – Johnny Vander Meer, Cincinnati Reds – June 11 and 15, 1938

Consecutive quality starts (six or more innings and three or fewer earned runs) (since 1920)

- 26 – Bob Gibson, St. Louis Cardinals – September 12, 1967 – July 30, 1968
- 26 - Jacob deGrom, New York Mets - May 18, 2018 - April 3, 2019

Consecutive quality starts within a single season (since 1920)

- 25 - Framber Valdez, Houston Astros – April 25 – September 18, 2022

Consecutive games with 10 or more strikeouts

- 11 – Gerrit Cole, Houston Astros – August 7 – October 10, 2019

Consecutive saves converted

- 84 – Éric Gagné, Los Angeles Dodgers – August 28, 2002 – July 5, 2004 (record set over three seasons)

Consecutive team games with a save

- 6 (3 tied)
  - Éric Gagné, Los Angeles Dodgers – May 16–22, 2003
  - Rod Beck, Chicago Cubs – August 30 through September 5, 1998
  - Addison Reed, Chicago White Sox – August 16–22, 2013

Consecutive team games with a relief appearance

- 13 (2 tied)
  - Mike Marshall, Los Angeles Dodgers – June 18 through July 3, 1974
  - Dale Mohorcic, Texas Rangers – August 6–20, 1986

Consecutive relief appearances with one or more strikeouts

- 49 – Aroldis Chapman, Cincinnati Reds – August 21, 2013 through August 13, 2014 (record set over two seasons)

Consecutive relief appearances to start a season with one or more strikeouts

- 45 – Corey Knebel, Milwaukee Brewers – April 3, 2017 through July 15, 2017

Consecutive relief appearances without allowing an earned run

- 43 - Zach Britton, Baltimore Orioles - May 1, 2016 through August 24, 2016

=== Consecutive innings records ===
Consecutive scoreless innings pitched

- 59 – Orel Hershiser, Los Angeles Dodgers – August 30, 1988 through September 28, 1988. (does not include 8 scoreless innings pitched in Game 1 of the 1988 NLCS or 2/3 scoreless innings pitched on April 5, 1989 to open the next season)

Consecutive hitless innings pitched

- 25.1 – Cy Young, Boston Americans – April 25 through May 11, 1904 (included one perfect game)

Consecutive perfect innings pitched

- 15.1 – Yusmeiro Petit, San Francisco Giants – July 22 through August 28, 2014 (as starting and relief pitcher over 8 games, 1st and 8th games as starting pitcher and 2nd through 7th games as a relief pitcher)
- 15.0 – Mark Buehrle, Chicago White Sox – July 18–28, 2009 (as starting pitcher, included one perfect game)

Consecutive innings pitched with a strikeout

- 73 – Gerrit Cole, Houston Astros – August 7 through October 10, 2019

Consecutive innings pitched without allowing a walk

- 84.1 – Bill Fischer, Kansas City Athletics – August 3 through September 30, 1962

Consecutive innings pitched without allowing a home run (modern era)

- 269.1 – Greg Minton, San Francisco Giants – June 1, 1979 through May 1, 1982

Consecutive innings pitched without allowing a home run (dead-ball era)

- 1001 – Ed Killian, Cleveland Indians and Detroit Tigers – September 19, 1903, through August 7, 1907

Consecutive batters faced with a strikeout

- 10 (4 tied)
  - Tom Seaver, New York Mets – April 22, 1970 (as a starting pitcher)
  - Éric Gagné, Los Angeles Dodgers – May 17–21, 2003 (as a relief pitcher)
  - Aaron Nola, Philadelphia Phillies – June 25, 2021
  - Corbin Burnes, Milwaukee Brewers – August 11, 2021

Consecutive strikes thrown (since pitch-by-pitch record keeping was introduced in 1988; includes foul balls and balls-in-play)

- 38 – Bartolo Colón, Oakland Athletics – April 18, 2012

Consecutive strikes thrown to start a game (since 1988)

- 24 – George Kirby, Seattle Mariners – August 24, 2022

Consecutive scoreless innings pitched to start a major league career

- 39 – Brad Ziegler, Oakland Athletics – May 31 through August 14, 2008

=== Consecutive season records ===
Consecutive seasons, 30 or more wins

- 6 – Tim Keefe, New York Metropolitans (American Association) and New York Giants 1883–1888

Consecutive seasons, 20 or more wins

- 12 – Christy Mathewson, New York Giants – 1903–1914

Consecutive seasons, 10 or more wins

- 20 – Greg Maddux, Chicago Cubs, Atlanta Braves, Los Angeles Dodgers, and San Diego Padres – 1988–2007 (includes a streak of 17 seasons with 15 or more wins, also a record)

Consecutive seasons, 300 or more strikeouts

- 5 – Randy Johnson, Seattle Mariners, Houston Astros, and Arizona Diamondbacks – 1998–2002

Consecutive seasons, 200 or more strikeouts

- 9 – Tom Seaver, New York Mets – 1968–1976

Consecutive seasons winning Triple Crown (lowest ERA, most wins, and most strikeouts in league - starting pitchers only)

- 2 - (4 tied)
  - - Grover Cleveland Alexander, Philadelphia Phillies (National League) - 1915–1916
  - - Lefty Grove, Philadelphia Athletics (American League) - 1930–1931 (led both leagues in both seasons)
  - - Sandy Koufax, Los Angeles Dodgers (National League) - 1965–1966 (led both leagues in both seasons)
  - - Roger Clemens, Toronto Blue Jays (American League) - 1997–1998

Consecutive Opening Day starts

- 14 – Jack Morris, Detroit Tigers, Minnesota Twins, and Toronto Blue Jays – 1980–1993

Consecutive seasons, 50 or more saves

- 2 (2 tied)
  - Éric Gagné, Los Angeles Dodgers - 2002–2003
  - Jim Johnson, Baltimore Orioles - 2012–2013

Consecutive seasons, 40 or more saves

- 4 – (3 tied)
  - Trevor Hoffman (twice), San Diego Padres – 1998–2001 and 2004–2007
  - Francisco Rodríguez, Los Angeles Angels of Anaheim – 2005–2008
  - Craig Kimbrel, Atlanta Braves – 2011–2014

Consecutive seasons, 30 or more saves

- 9 – Mariano Rivera, New York Yankees – 2003–2011

== Fielding ==
The nature and demands of each position differ significantly, thus the records are separated by position. The streaks listed below are only relative to a player's fielding chances while playing the listed position. Errors made at other positions would not disrupt the streak listed.

Consecutive fielding chances at each position without an error

- First base – 2,379 – Casey Kotchman, Los Angeles Angels of Anaheim / Atlanta Braves / Boston Red Sox / Seattle Mariners – June 20, 2008, through August 21, 2010
- Second base – 911 – Plácido Polanco, Detroit Tigers / Philadelphia Phillies – July 1, 2006, through April 7, 2008
- Shortstop – 544 – Mike Bordick, Baltimore Orioles / Toronto Blue Jays – April 10, 2002, through April 2, 2003
- Third base – 272 – Vinny Castilla, Colorado Rockies / Washington Nationals – July 4, 2004, through April 22, 2005
- Outfield – 938 – Darren Lewis, Oakland Athletics / San Francisco Giants – August 21 – October 3, 1990 / July 13, 1991, through June 29, 1994
- Catcher – 1,565 – Mike Matheny, St. Louis Cardinals – August 1, 2002, through August 4, 2004 (does not include passed balls)
- Pitcher – 273 – Claude Passeau, Chicago Cubs – September 21, 1941, through May 20, 1946

Source for figures through 2007: The Elias Book of Baseball Records, 2008.

== Games played ==
Consecutive games played

- 2,632 – Cal Ripken Jr., Baltimore Orioles – May 30, 1982 through September 19, 1998

Consecutive innings played (non-pitcher)

- 8,243 – Cal Ripken Jr., Baltimore Orioles – June 5, 1982 through September 14, 1987 (record set over 903 games)

Consecutive seasons played

- 27 – Cap Anson, Rockford Forest Citys, Philadelphia Athletics, Chicago White Stockings, and Chicago Colts – 1871–1897 (1871–1875 seasons were played in the National Association, a professional league which preceded Major League Baseball).
- 26 – Nolan Ryan, New York Mets, California Angels, Houston Astros, and Texas Rangers – 1968–1993 (all seasons played in Major League Baseball)

Consecutive seasons played with one team

- 23 (2 tied)
  - Brooks Robinson, Baltimore Orioles – 1955–1977
  - Carl Yastrzemski, Boston Red Sox – 1961–1983

Consecutive seasons played with different or multiple teams (includes off-season and mid-season changes)

- 12 – Terry Mulholland, Philadelphia Phillies, New York Yankees, San Francisco Giants, Seattle Mariners, Chicago Cubs, Atlanta Braves, Pittsburgh Pirates, Los Angeles Dodgers, Cleveland Indians, and Minnesota Twins – 1993–2004

Consecutive seasons with a playoff appearance

- 13 – Mariano Rivera, New York Yankees – 1995–2007

== Awards ==
Consecutive MVP Awards

- 4 – Barry Bonds, San Francisco Giants – 2001–2004

Consecutive Cy Young Awards

- 4 (2 tied)
  - Greg Maddux, Chicago Cubs and Atlanta Braves – 1992–1995
  - Randy Johnson, Arizona Diamondbacks – 1999–2002

Consecutive Gold Glove Awards

- 16 (2 tied)
  - Brooks Robinson, Baltimore Orioles – 1960–1975
  - Jim Kaat, Minnesota Twins, Chicago White Sox, and Philadelphia Phillies – 1962–1977

Consecutive Silver Slugger Awards (award first attributed in 1980)

- 10 – Mike Piazza, Los Angeles Dodgers and New York Mets – 1993–2002

Consecutive Hank Aaron Awards (award first attributed in 1999; fan voting first included in 2003)

- 3 – Alex Rodriguez, Texas Rangers – 2001–2003

Consecutive Edgar Martínez Awards (award first attributed in 1973, originally called the Outstanding Designated Hitter Award)

- 5 – David Ortiz, Boston Red Sox – 2003–2007

Consecutive Rolaids Relief Man of the Year Awards (award first attributed in 1976, discontinued after 2012)

- 4 – Dan Quisenberry, Kansas City Royals – 1982–1985

Consecutive MLB Player of the Month Awards (award first attributed in 1958)

- 3 – Mark McGwire, St. Louis Cardinals – September, 1997 through May, 1998

Consecutive MLB Pitcher of the Month Awards (award first attributed in 1975)

- 3 (3 tied)
  - Pedro Martínez, Boston Red Sox – April–June, 1999
  - Johan Santana, Minnesota Twins – July–September, 2004
  - Jake Arrieta, Chicago Cubs - August, 2015 through April, 2016

Consecutive MLB Rookie of the Month Awards (award first attributed in 2001)

- 4 – Mike Trout, Los Angeles Angels of Anaheim – May–August, 2012

Consecutive All-Star Game appearances

- 25 – Hank Aaron, Milwaukee / Atlanta Braves, Milwaukee Brewers – 1955–1975 (two games were played from 1959–1962)
