= Len Whitehouse =

American baseball player (born 1957)

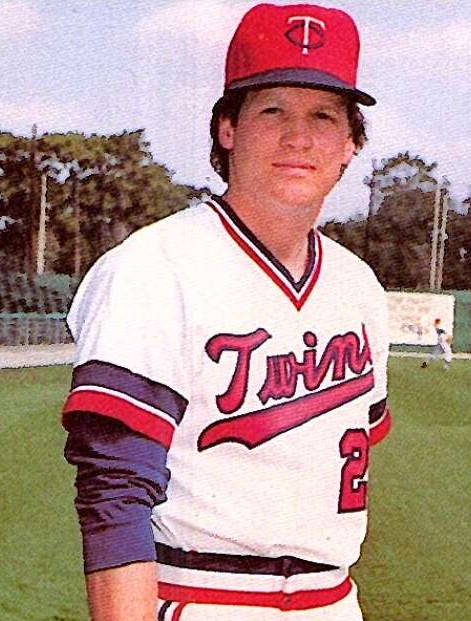
- Whitehouse with the Minnesota Twins c. 1985
- Pitcher
- Born: September 10, 1957 (age 68); Burlington, Vermont, U.S.
- Batted: Left Threw: Left

MLB debut
- September 1, 1981, for the Texas Rangers

Last MLB appearance
- June 24, 1985, for the Minnesota Twins

MLB statistics
- Win–loss record: 9–4
- Earned run average: 4.67
- Strikeouts: 68
- Stats at Baseball Reference

Teams
- Texas Rangers (1981); Minnesota Twins (1983–1985)

Leonard Joseph Whitehouse (born September 10, 1957) is a retired Major League Baseball player who pitched in relief for the Texas Rangers in 1981 and for the Minnesota Twins from 1983 to 1985.

Whitehouse played two seasons of high school baseball at Burlington High School in his native Burlington, Vermont. After attending a tryout for the Pittsburgh Pirates in Maine, he was invited to participate in the Florida Instructional League in 1976. He signed a contract with the Texas Rangers on Christmas afternoon 1976 at Burlington International Airport.

He finished his career with a 9-4 record with four saves and a 4.24 ERA in 97 appearances. Since 1967, Whitehouse is one of only two Vermont high school baseball players to make it into the Major Leagues. He was the pitcher when Reggie Jackson struck out for the 2,000th time in his career.

After his playing career, Whitehouse's endeavors included serving as baseball coach for several Vermont high schools and assistant baseball coach at Saint Michael's College in Colchester, Vermont.
