= Rick Lisi =

Canadian baseball player (born 1956)

- Outfielder
- Born: March 17, 1956 (age 70); Halifax, Nova Scotia, Canada
- Batted: Right Threw: Right

MLB debut
- May 9, 1981, for the Texas Rangers

Last MLB appearance
- May 29, 1981, for the Texas Rangers

MLB statistics
- Batting average: .313
- Home runs: 0
- Runs batted in: 1
- Stats at Baseball Reference

Teams
- Texas Rangers (1981)

Riccardo Patrick Emilio Lisi (born March 17, 1956) is a Canadian former Major League Baseball (MLB) outfielder. He was drafted by the Texas Rangers in the 13th round of the 1974 amateur draft, and played for the Rangers in 1981. The 25-year-old rookie stood 6'0" and weighed 175 lbs.

Lisi spent about three weeks with Texas, playing in his first game May 9, 1981, and his last on May 29. He made his major league debut as a pinch runner for catcher Jim Sundberg against the Baltimore Orioles at Arlington Stadium. He appeared in 9 games and hit .312 (5-for-16) with 1 run batted in and 6 runs scored. He drew 4 walks which pushed his on-base percentage up to .450. In eight outfield appearances he handled 9 chances without an error.

On February 19, 1982, Lisi was traded to the Baltimore Orioles, and never again reached the big league level. He continued to play minor league baseball until 1985, spending his final professional season with the Maine Guides in the Cleveland Indians farm system.
