= Roy Grimes =

American baseball player

- Second baseman
- Born: September 11, 1893; Bergholz, Ohio, U.S.
- Died: September 13, 1954 (aged 61); Hanoverton, Ohio, U.S.
- Batted: Right Threw: Right

MLB debut
- July 5, 1920, for the New York Giants

Last MLB appearance
- October 3, 1920, for the New York Giants

Career statistics
- Batting average: .158
- Home runs: 0
- Runs batted in: 3
- Stats at Baseball Reference

Teams
- New York Giants (1920)

Austin Roy Grimes (September 11, 1893 – September 13, 1954) was an American second baseman in Major League Baseball who played briefly for the New York Giants in 1920. Grimes batted and threw right-handed. He was born in Bergholz, Ohio.

In a one-season career, Grimes posted a .158 batting average (9-for-57) and three runs batted in with no home runs in 26 games played. Grimes played 20 years in the minor leagues, from 1913 to 1932. In the five seasons from 1923 through 1927, Grimes batted .335 for the Columbus Senators and Toledo Mud Hens of the American Association, a league on the top rung of the minors.

Grimes died in Hanoverton, Ohio on September 13, 1954, two days after his 61st birthday. After his baseball career, Grimes and his brother Ray had worked at a contracting firm together. Roy would then operate a fishing camp and boat livery service in Columbiana County.

== Family ==
Grimes was the twin brother of first baseman Ray Grimes and uncle of infielder Oscar Grimes, also with major league experience. A third brother, Kenneth Grimes, was a teammate of Roy and Ray in the minor leagues.
