= John Callahan (pitcher) =

American baseball player (1874–1954)

- Pitcher
- Born: October 3, 1874; Freeport, Illinois, U.S.
- Died: February 15, 1954 (aged 79); Oklahoma City, Oklahoma, U.S.

MLB debut
- September 3, 1898, for the St. Louis Browns

Last MLB appearance
- September 4, 1898, for the St. Louis Browns

MLB statistics
- Win–loss record: 0-2
- Strikeouts: 2
- Earned run average: 16.20
- Stats at Baseball Reference

Teams
- St. Louis Browns (1898)

John William Callahan (October 3, 1874 – February 15, 1954) was an American Major League Baseball pitcher. He played for the St. Louis Browns during the 1898 season.
