= Ebba St. Claire =

American baseball player (1921-1982)

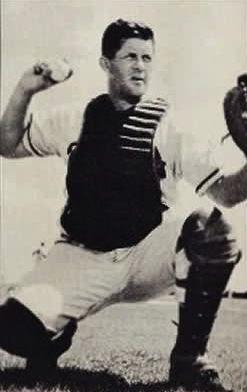
- Catcher
- Born: August 5, 1921; Whitehall, New York, U.S.
- Died: August 22, 1982 (aged 61); Whitehall, New York, U.S.
- Batted: Switch Threw: Right

MLB debut
- April 17, 1951, for the Boston Braves

Last MLB appearance
- May 18, 1954, for the New York Giants

MLB statistics
- Batting average: .249
- Home runs: 7
- Runs batted in: 40
- Stats at Baseball Reference

Teams
- Boston / Milwaukee Braves (1951–1953); New York Giants (1954)

Edward Joseph "Ebba" St. Claire (August 5, 1921 – August 22, 1982) was an American catcher in Major League Baseball. St. Claire stood 6 ft 1 in (1.85 m) tall and weighed 219 pounds. He was a switch hitter and threw right-handed. He can best be described as a prototypical defensive-minded backup catcher.

He was born in Whitehall, New York, and was a standout catcher on the Whitehall Central High School baseball team. After his high school career ended, St. Claire attended Colgate University, where he was a star player.

As there was no amateur entry baseball draft at the time, St. Claire began his professional career on January 1, 1942, when he was signed as an amateur free agent by the Pittsburgh Pirates.

After a long minor league career, St. Claire was traded by Pittsburgh to the Boston Braves as part of a minor league working agreement so that he could tutor young pitchers in the Braves organization. He made his major league debut with Boston on April 17, 1951. He played with Boston again in 1952 and continued to play with the Braves franchise in 1953 when they relocated and became the Milwaukee Braves. On February 1, 1954, St. Claire was traded by Milwaukee with Johnny Antonelli, Billy Klaus, Don Liddle, and $50,000 to the New York Giants for Bobby Thomson and Sam Calderone. After spending much of this season in the minor leagues, St. Claire was released from his contract and never played professional baseball again.

Ebba St. Claire died in Whitehall at the age of 61. His son Randy St. Claire played for five Major League clubs between 1984 and 1994, and later became a pitching coach.
