= Ray Grimes =

American baseball player (1893–1953)

- Grimes with his son Oscar Ray Jr., before a Cubs game circa 1921.
- First baseman
- Born: September 11, 1893; Bergholz, Ohio, U.S.
- Died: May 25, 1953 (aged 59); Minerva, Ohio, U.S.
- Batted: Switch Threw: Right

MLB debut
- September 24, 1920, for the Boston Red Sox

Last MLB appearance
- August 12, 1926, for the Philadelphia Phillies

MLB statistics
- Batting average: .329
- Home runs: 27
- Runs batted in: 263
- Stats at Baseball Reference

Teams
- Boston Red Sox (1920); Chicago Cubs (1921–1924); Philadelphia Phillies (1926)

Career highlights and awards
- MLB record 17-game RBI streak

Oscar Ray Grimes Sr. (September 11, 1893 – May 25, 1953) was an American first baseman in Major League Baseball who played for the Boston Red Sox (1920), Chicago Cubs (1921–1924) and Philadelphia Phillies (1926). Grimes batted and threw right-handed.

== Early life, family and education ==
Grimes was born in Bergholz, Ohio to parents Thomas and Alnette. He was the twin brother of second baseman Roy Grimes, who was also a professional baseball player, as a member of the New York Giants in 1920.

== Playing career ==
Grimes emerged as one of the first Chicago Cubs heroes of the early 1920s. He appeared in a game with the Boston Red Sox in 1920 before being traded to the Cubs in 1921. That season he hit .321 with 79 runs batted in, 38 doubles, and 91 runs in a career-high 149 games.

=== Record season (1922) ===
In 1922, while with the Cubs, Grimes set a major-league mark with at least one RBI over 17 consecutive games (from June 27 to July 23), a record which still stands. As noted by baseball historian Clifton Blue Parker, "It is a little-known record, but perhaps one of the most enduring and challenging ones." During the streak, Grimes drove in 27 runs and had 29 hits in 67 at-bats for a .433 batting average, including seven doubles, three triples and three home runs. He finished the 1922 season with 99 RBI, 99 runs, 45 doubles, 12 triples, 14 home runs, and hit .354, ending second in the National League batting race behind Rogers Hornsby (.401).

His career declined after suffering a slipped disc in 1923. He appeared in only 115 games with the Cubs during 1923 and 1924, and played 32 games with the Philadelphia Phillies in 1926, his last major league season. In a six-season career, Grimes was a .329 hitter with 27 home runs and 263 RBI in 433 games.

== Post-athletic career ==
After retiring from baseball, Grimes settled in Minerva, Ohio, where he raised his family. He worked at the Cronin China Company.

== Personal life and demise ==
Ray Grimes was the father of Oscar Grimes, an infielder who played with the Cleveland Indians, New York Yankees, and Philadelphia Athletics between 1938 and 1946.

Grimes died of a heart ailment at age 59 while at work at the Cronin China Company.

== See also ==
- List of second-generation Major League Baseball players
- List of Major League Baseball individual streaks
