= Yasuyuki Nakai =

Japanese baseball player (1954–2014)

- Pitcher
- Born: August 7, 1954; Kyoto, Japan
- Died: August 9, 2014 (aged 60)

MLB debut
- 1979, for the Yomiuri Giants

Last MLB appearance
- 1984, for the Yomiuri Giants

Teams
- Yomiuri Giants (1979–1984)

Yasuyuki Nakai (中井康之^{?}; August 7, 1954 – August 9, 2014) was a Japanese baseball player.
