= Mark Mercer =

American baseball player (born 1954)

- Pitcher
- Born: May 22, 1954 (age 72); Fort Bragg, North Carolina, U.S.
- Batted: left Threw: left

MLB debut
- September 1, 1981, for the Texas Rangers

Last MLB appearance
- September 28, 1981, for the Texas Rangers

MLB statistics
- Win–loss record: 0–1
- Earned run average: 4.70
- Strikeouts: 8
- Stats at Baseball Reference

Teams
- Texas Rangers (1981)

Mark Kenneth Mercer (born May 22, 1954) is an American former professional baseball pitcher from Fort Bragg, North Carolina. He appeared in seven games in Major League Baseball for the 1981 Texas Rangers.

Mercer was drafted by the Pittsburgh Pirates in the 1st round of the secondary phase of the 1973 amateur draft out of Hill College. He was released by the Pirates during spring training in 1976. He left professional baseball for two full seasons before signing with the Rangers prior to the 1978 season.
