= Steve Comer (baseball) =

American baseball player (born 1954)

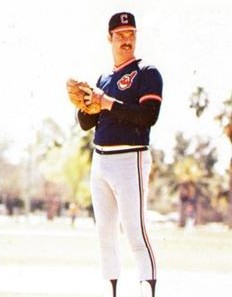
- Pitcher
- Born: January 13, 1954 (age 72); Minneapolis, Minnesota, U.S.
- Batted: Both Threw: Right

MLB debut
- April 15, 1978, for the Texas Rangers

Last MLB appearance
- September 15, 1984, for the Cleveland Indians

MLB statistics
- Win–loss record: 44–37
- Earned run average: 4.13
- Strikeouts: 245
- Stats at Baseball Reference

Teams
- Texas Rangers (1978–1982); Philadelphia Phillies (1983); Cleveland Indians (1984)

Steven Michael Comer (born January 13, 1954) is an American former professional baseball pitcher, who player in Major League Baseball (MLB) for the Texas Rangers, Philadelphia Phillies, and Cleveland Indians in all or parts of seven seasons.

== Early life ==
Comer was born January 13, 1954, in Minneapolis, the son of Kenneth Donald Comer (1928-2009) and Joyce Emily Nelson Comer (1928–2010). His father served as a sergeant in the United States Army during the Korean War. He had two older brothers, Kenneth Donald Comer Jr. and John Nelson Comer, and a younger sister, Laurie Gail Comer, who died before turning a month old in 1960.

Comer attended the University of Minnesota. In 1974, he played collegiate summer baseball with the Cotuit Kettleers of the Cape Cod Baseball League. He was not drafted by an MLB club, instead working in construction before being signed by the Texas Rangers in 1976.

== Major League Career ==
Comer played for the Texas Rangers (1978–1982), Philadelphia Phillies (1983), and Cleveland Indians (1984).

His first year in the Major Leagues had Comer both starting and relieving, going 11-5 with an ERA of 2.30 in 30 games, 11 of them starts. He completed three games, threw two shutouts, finished 14 games and had one save.

His best season came in 1979 when he won a career-high 17 games for the Rangers and set personal bests for innings pitched, complete games, and strikeouts. He also led the team in wins, with one more than Hall of Fame pitcher Fergie Jenkins, and was second to Jenkins in games started (36) and complete games (6) for the team.

In 1980, Comer came into the season in the rotation, but he started the year on a negative note, losing three of his first four decisions with an ERA around 10.00 when he was sidelined due to a shoulder injury. He wouldn't recover fully that year, finishing at 2-4 with a 7.99 ERA.

In 1981, his shoulder was healed, and Comer was a vital part of the Rangers bullpen, pitching in 36 games, finishing 22 of them, and earning 6 saves, tying him with Charlie Hough for the team lead. He also went 8-2 with a 2.56 ERA.

1982 was more of a trying year for Comer, as he pitched in one more game than the previous year (37), and nailed down six more saves, but ultimately he struggled, going 1-6 with an ERA of 5.10. He was released by the Rangers after the season.

Prior to the 1983 season, Comer was signed by the New York Yankees, but released before Opening Day; he then signed with the Seattle Mariners, who released him in June. Picked up by the Phillies, Comer appeared in only three games for them that season, going 1-0 with a 5.19 ERA in three games, one of those a start. Philadelphia would lose the World Series that year, though Comer was a non-factor in the postseason, not appearing on their roster.

Comer would wrap up his Major League career in 1984 with the Indians, for whom he went 4-8 with an ERA of 5.68 in 22 games, 20 of them starts. He was one of seven pitchers that year to start double digit games for Cleveland.

== Personal life ==
On November 3, 1979 in Hennepin County, Minnesota, Steve married Kathy Lynn Gatz (b. January 10, 1955). Together they have three daughters: Margaret Anne Comer Hansel (b. July 2, 1985); Lauren Elizabeth Comer Schlangen (b. November 10, 1987) and Stephanie Lynn Comer (b. November 6, 1990).

Comer is a descendant of the Newkirk family, an early Dutch settler family to Ulster County, New York, as well as the Hay family, being a second cousin, four times removed of United States Secretary of State John Hay. A second cousin is actor Dash Mihok, as his grandfather Kenneth Newkirk Comer is the older brother of Mihok's grandmother, Zoe Comer Cloak.
