= Dan Duran (baseball) =

American baseball player (born 1954)

- Left fielder
- Born: March 16, 1954 (age 72); Palo Alto, California, U.S.
- Batted: Left Threw: Left

MLB debut
- April 17, 1981, for the Texas Rangers

Last MLB appearance
- June 10, 1981, for the Texas Rangers

MLB statistics
- Batting average: .250
- At bats: 16
- Hits: 4
- Stats at Baseball Reference

Teams
- Texas Rangers (1981)

Daniel James Duran (born March 16, 1954) is an American former professional baseball left fielder. Duran played in Major League Baseball (MLB) for the Texas Rangers during the 1981 season. In 13 games, Duran had four hits in 16 at-bats, with one run scored. He batted and threw left-handed.

Duran is of Indigenous Mexican descent. He attended Sunnyvale High School in California where he played baseball and football. He was recruited but not offered a scholarship to play college football at Stanford and offered a scholarship to play college baseball at UC Davis. He ultimately chose to attend Foothill College. During his offseasons in the minors, he worked in construction.

He was drafted by the Rangers in the 30th round of the 1973 amateur draft.
