= 1979 Caribbean Series =

Twenty-second edition of baseball tournament; held in San Juan, Puerto Rico

The twenty-second edition of the Caribbean Series (Serie del Caribe) was played in 1979. It was held from February 4 through February 9 with the champions teams from Dominican Republic (Aguilas Cibaeñas), Mexico (Mayos de Navojoa), Puerto Rico (Criollos de Caguas) and Venezuela (Navegantes del Magallanes). The format consisted of 12 games, each team facing the other teams twice. The games were played at Hiram Bithorn Stadium in San Juan, Puerto Rico, which boosted capacity to 18.000 seats.

== Summary ==
Navegantes de Magallanes of Venezuela clinched its second team Caribbean Series title and second as a country with a 5-1 record. Guided by manager/DH Willie Horton (.261 BA, .414 OBP) and Series Most Valuable Player Mitchell Page (.417 BA, two home runs, 11 RBI, six runs, .875 SLG), the Venezuelan club took the top spot despite a 1–0 defeat to Dominican Republic in Game 1. The rest of the way, the team won the next five games outscoring their rivals 38-13. Center fielder Jerry White, who was the only player in the series with at least one hit in each game, led the hitters with a .522 BA and a .607 OBP, including five runs, four RBI, a .783 SLG and 1.370 OPS. Other contributions came from outfielder Oswaldo Olivares (.435 BA, .536 OBP, seven RBI), infielder Dave Coleman (four runs, six RBI, .357 OBP), catcher Bo Díaz (.273 BA, four RBI, .429 OBP) and second baseman Rodney Scott (.308, eight runs). The strong pitching staff was led by Mike Norris, who posted a 2-0 record with a 0.00 ERA and 13 strikeouts (including a one-hit shutout and three innings of relief), while reliever Manny Sarmiento went 2-0 with a 2.16 in 8 1/3 of work and Ben Wiltbank won his only start in 8.0 scoreless innings. Larry Rothschild, Jim Umbarger and Alan Wirth also bolstered the staff.

Aguilas Cibaeñas represented the Dominican Republic and finished second with a 4-2 record. Managed by Johnny Lipon, the team got wins from reliever George Frazier (2-0) and starters Nino Espinosa (a four-hit shutout) and Ken Kravec, but with no help from a shaky defense, which committed nine errors for a series high, and lacking a clutch hitter in crucial situations. Other players in the roster included Joaquín Andújar (SP), Bob Beall (RP), Bill Castro (RP), Ted Cox (IF), Miguel Diloné (OF), Al Holland (RP), Juan Jiménez (RP), Silvio Martínez (SP), Omar Moreno (OF), Nelson Norman (IF) and Rennie Stennett (IF), among others.

The Criollos de Caguas of Puerto Rico, managed by Félix Millán, wasted home field advantage, ending in third place with a 2-4 mark. The team was first in fielding percentage (.970, five errors), but posted poor numbers in pitching (5.65 ERA) and hitting (.249). DH Tony Pérez (.333) paced the offense, while Jackson Todd and Sheldon Burnside collected the two wins. A high point in the series was the presence of José Cruz and his brothers Tommy and Héctor in the roster. The team also featured pitchers Larry Anderson, Dennis Martínez, Tim Stoddard and John Verhoeven; catchers Ellie Rodríguez and Don Werner; infielders Tony Bernazard, Iván de Jesús, Luis Rosado, Dave Rosello and Jim Spencer, and outfielders Jim Dwyer, Tony Scott and Rusty Torres.

The Mayos de Navojoa of Mexico, managed by Chuck Goggin, finished last at 1-5. Pitcher Arturo González had their lone win, against Puerto Rico, while Antonio Pollorena dropped two decisions. Among others, the roster included players as Mike Easler (DH), Garry Hancock (OF), Jeffrey Leonard (OF), Mario Mendoza (IF), Randy Niemann (P), Dave Rajsich (P), Enrique Romo (P) Alex Treviño (C), Bobby Treviño (OF), and 20-year-old rookie outfielder Rickey Henderson, a future Hall of Fame member.

Final standings
Country	Club	W	L	W/L %	GB
Venezuela	Navegantes del Magallanes	5	1	.833	–
Dominican Republic	Aguilas Cibaeñas	4	2	.667	1.0
Puerto Rico	Criollos de Caguas	2	4	.333	3.0
Mexico	Mayos de Navojoa	1	5	.167	4.0

Individual leaders
Player	Statistic
Jerry White (VEN)	Batting average	.522
Mitchell Page (VEN)	Home runs	2
Mitchell Page (VEN)	RBI	11
Rodney Scott (VEN)	Runs	8
Jerry White (VEN)	Hits	12
Jerry White (VEN)	Doubles	4
Bo Díaz (VEN); Mitchell Page (VEN); Jerry White (VEN)	Triples	1
Eight tied	Stolen bases	1
Jerry White (VEN)	OBP	.607
Mitchell Page (VEN)	SLG	.875
Jerry White (VEN)	OPS	1.370
George Frazier (DOM); Mike Norris (VEN); Manny Sarmiento (VEN)	Wins	2
Mike Norris (VEN)	Strikeouts	13
Mike Norris (VEN)	ERA	0.00
Nino Espinosa (DOM)	Innings pitched	15.0
Juan Jiménez (DOM)	Saves	1
Seven tied	Games pitched	3
Awards
Mitchell Page (VEN)	Most Valuable Player
Willie Horton (VEN)	Manager

All-Star Team
Name	Position
Bo Díaz (VEN)	catcher
Mitchell Page (VEN)	first baseman
Rodney Scott (VEN)	second baseman
Dave Coleman (VEN)	third baseman
Nelson Norman (DOM)	shortstop
Rickey Henderson (MEX)	left fielder
Jerry White (VEN)	center fielder
Oswaldo Olivares (VEN)	right fielder
Tony Pérez (PRI)	designated hitter
Mike Norris (VEN)	RH pitcher
Sheldon Burnside (PRI)	LH pitcher
Manny Sarmiento (VEN)	relief pitcher
Willie Horton (VEN)	manager

== Scoreboards ==
=== Game 1, February 4 ===
Team	1	2	3	4	5	6	7	8	9	R	H	E
Venezuela	0	0	0	0	0	0	0	0	0	0	4	1
Dominican Republic	0	0	0	0	0	1	0	0	X	1	3	2
WP: Nino Espinosa (1-0) LP: Alan Wirth (0-1)

=== Game 2, February 4 ===
Team	1	2	3	4	5	6	7	8	9	R	H	E
Mexico	2	0	0	0	0	0	0	0	0	2	7	1
Puerto Rico	0	3	5	0	0	0	0	0	X	8	11	0
WP: Jackson Todd (1-0) LP: Randy Niemann (0-1); Home runs: MEX: None; PRI: Luis Rosado (1)

=== Game 3, February 5 ===
Team	1	2	3	4	5	6	7	8	9	R	H	E
Dominican Republic	1	0	0	0	1	1	0	0	2	5	7	2
Mexico	0	0	1	0	1	0	0	1	1	4	11	3
WP: George Frazier (1-0) LP: Dave Rajsich (0-1)

=== Game 4, February 5 ===
Team	1	2	3	4	5	6	7	8	9	R	H	E
Puerto Rico	0	0	0	0	0	0	0	0	0	0	0	1
Venezuela	0	0	4	0	5	0	2	0	X	11	15	2
WP: Mike Norris (1-0) LP: Dennis Martínez (0-1)

=== Game 5, February 6 ===
Team	1	2	3	4	5	6	7	8	9	R	H	E
Mexico	0	0	0	0	0	0	0	0	0	0	5	2
Venezuela	0	0	6	0	0	1	0	1	X	8	13	1
WP: Ben Wilbank (1-0) LP: Antonio Pollorena (0-1)

=== Game 6, February 6 ===
Team	1	2	3	4	5	6	7	8	9	R	H	E
Dominican Republic	0	0	0	0	0	0	0	0	0	0	9	0
Puerto Rico	1	0	0	0	0	1	1	0	X	3	8	0
WP: Sheldon Burnside (1-0) LP: Silvio Martínez (0-1)

=== Game 7, February 7 ===
Team	1	2	3	4	5	6	7	8	9	10	R	H	E
Mexico	0	0	0	0	0	2	2	0	0	0	4	7	2
Dominican Republic	0	0	0	0	0	1	1	0	2	1	5	13	2
WP: George Frazier (2-0) LP: Antonio Pollorena (0-2)

=== Game 8, February 7 ===
Team	1	2	3	4	5	6	7	8	9	R	H	E
Venezuela	2	0	0	0	2	0	1	0	3	8	12	1
Puerto Rico	3	0	0	0	0	2	0	0	0	5	10	1
WP: Manny Sarmiento (1-0) LP: Randy Scarbery (0-1); Home runs: VEN: Mitchell Page (1); PRI: None

=== Game 9, February 8 ===
Team	1	2	3	4	5	6	7	8	9	10	R	H	E
Dominican Republic	0	1	0	0	0	0	0	0	0	0	1	7	3
Venezuela	1	0	0	0	0	0	0	0	0	1	2	10	1
WP: Mike Norris (2-0) LP: Bill Castro (0-1)

=== Game 10, February 8 ===
Team	1	2	3	4	5	6	7	8	9	R	H	E
Puerto Rico	1	0	0	0	0	4	0	0	0	5	7	3
Mexico	1	0	0	0	2	0	2	3	X	8	12	0
WP: Arturo González (1-0) LP: Tim Stoddard (0-1); Home runs: PRI: Héctor Cruz (1); MEX: Jim Obradovich (1)

=== Game 11, February 9 ===
Team	1	2	3	4	5	6	7	8	9	R	H	E
Venezuela	0	1	1	0	2	0	2	0	3	9	14	3
Mexico	0	0	3	0	1	2	0	0	0	6	10	3
WP: Manny Sarmiento (2-0) LP: Ramón Guzmán (0-1); Home runs: VEN: Rodney Scott (1), Mitchell Page (2); MEX: None

=== Game 12, February 9 ===
Team	1	2	3	4	5	6	7	8	9	R	H	E
Puerto Rico	0	0	0	0	1	0	0	0	0	1	6	0
Dominican Republic	2	0	0	1	0	0	0	0	X	3	5	0
WP: Ken Kravec (1-0) LP: Randy Scarbery (0-2) Sv: Juan Jiménez (1); Home runs: PRI: None; DOM: Tom Silverio (1)

== See also ==
- Ballplayers who have appeared in the Series

== Sources ==
- Antero Núñez, José. Series del Caribe. Impresos Urbina, Caracas, Venezuela.
- Araujo Bojórquez, Alfonso. Series del Caribe: Narraciones y estadísticas, 1949-2001. Colegio de Bachilleres del Estado de Sinaloa, Mexico.
- Figueredo, Jorge S. Cuban Baseball: A Statistical History, 1878 - 1961. Macfarland & Co., United States.
- González Echevarría, Roberto. The Pride of Havana. Oxford University Express.
- Gutiérrez, Daniel. Enciclopedia del Béisbol en Venezuela, Caracas, Venezuela.
