= 1982 Cleveland Indians season =

1982 Cleveland Indians
- League: American League
- Division: East
- Ballpark: Cleveland Municipal Stadium
- City: Cleveland, Ohio
- Owners: Steve O'Neill
- General managers: Phil Seghi
- Managers: Dave Garcia
- Television: WUAB
- Radio: WWWE

The Cleveland Indians' 1982 season was the 82nd for the franchise. The team finished with a 78–84 record (.481), placing them in sixth place (tied with Toronto) in the American League East, 17 games behind the eventual AL champion Milwaukee Brewers.

== Offseason ==
- November 14, 1981: Duane Kuiper was traded by the Indians to the San Francisco Giants for Ed Whitson.
- November 20, 1981: Bo Diaz was traded by the Indians to the Philadelphia Phillies as part of a three-team trade. The Phillies sent a player to be named later to the Indians. The St. Louis Cardinals sent Lary Sorensen and Silvio Martinez to the Indians. The Phillies sent Lonnie Smith to the Cardinals.
- December 9, 1981: the Philadelphia Phillies sent Scott Munninghoff (minors) to complete the November 20, 1981 trade.
- January 15, 1982: Rick Waits was signed as a free agent by the Indians.
- February 13, 1982: Mike Stanton was released by the Indians.
- February 16, 1982: Sid Monge was traded by the Indians to the Philadelphia Phillies for Bake McBride.
- March 26, 1982: Dave Rosello was released by the Indians.

== Regular season ==
=== Season standings ===
AL East
Team	W	L	Pct.	GB	Home	Road
Milwaukee Brewers	95	67	.586	—	48‍–‍34	47‍–‍33
Baltimore Orioles	94	68	.580	1	53‍–‍28	41‍–‍40
Boston Red Sox	89	73	.549	6	49‍–‍32	40‍–‍41
Detroit Tigers	83	79	.512	12	47‍–‍34	36‍–‍45
New York Yankees	79	83	.488	16	42‍–‍39	37‍–‍44
Cleveland Indians	78	84	.481	17	41‍–‍40	37‍–‍44
Toronto Blue Jays	78	84	.481	17	44‍–‍37	34‍–‍47

=== Record vs. opponents ===
1982 American League record Sources:
Team	BAL	BOS	CAL	CWS	CLE	DET	KC	MIL	MIN	NYY	OAK	SEA	TEX	TOR
Baltimore	—	4–9	7–5	5–7	6–7	7–6	4–8	9–4–1	8–4	11–2	7–5	7–5	9–3	10–3
Boston	9–4	—	7–5	4–8	6–7	8–5	6–6	4–9	6–6	7–6	8–4	7–5	10–2	7–6
California	5–7	5–7	—	8–5	8–4	5–7	7–6	6–6	7–6	7–5	9–4	10–3	8–5	8–4
Chicago	7–5	8–4	5–8	—	6–6	9–3	3–10	3–9	7–6	8–4	9–4	6–7	8–5	8–4
Cleveland	7–6	7–6	4–8	6–6	—	6–7	2–10	7–6	8–4	4–9	4–8	9–3	7–5	7–6
Detroit	6–7	5–8	7–5	3–9	7–6	—	6–6	3–10	9–3	8–5	9–3	6–6	8–4	6–7
Kansas City	8–4	6–6	6–7	10–3	10–2	6–6	—	7–5	7–6	5–7	7–6	7–6	7–6	4–8
Milwaukee	4–9–1	9–4	6–6	9–3	6–7	10–3	5–7	—	7–5	8–5	7–5	8–4	7–5	9–4
Minnesota	4–8	6–6	6–7	6–7	4–8	3–9	6–7	5–7	—	2–10	3–10	5–8	5–8	5–7
New York	2–11	6–7	5–7	4–8	9–4	5–8	7–5	5–8	10–2	—	7–5	6–6	7–5	6–7
Oakland	5–7	4–8	4–9	4–9	8–4	3–9	6–7	5–7	10–3	5–7	—	6–7	5–8	3–9
Seattle	5–7	5–7	3–10	7–6	3–9	6–6	6–7	4–8	8–5	6–6	7–6	—	9–4	7–5
Texas	3–9	2–10	5–8	5–8	5–7	4–8	6–7	5–7	8–5	5–7	8–5	4–9	—	4–8
Toronto	3–10	6–7	4–8	4–8	6–7	7–6	8–4	4–9	7–5	7–6	9–3	5–7	8–4	—

=== Notable transactions ===
- September 12, 1982: John Denny was traded by the Indians to the Philadelphia Phillies for Jerry Reed, Wil Culmer, and Roy Smith.

=== Opening Day Lineup ===
Opening Day Starters
#	Name	Position
27	Miguel Diloné	LF
11	Toby Harrah	3B
21	Mike Hargrove	1B
29	Andre Thornton	DH
26	Bake McBride	RF
9	Ron Hassey	C
20	Rick Manning	CF
16	Jack Perconte	2B
10	Jerry Dybzinski	SS
36	Rick Waits	P

=== Roster ===
1982 Cleveland Indians
Roster
Pitchers: 51 Bud Anderson; 39 Len Barker; 28 Bert Blyleven; 31 John Bohnet; 45 Tom Brennan; 40 John Denny; 48 Ed Glynn; 44 Neal Heaton; 41 Dennis Lewallyn; 31 Jerry Reed; 38 Lary Sorensen; 37 Dan Spillner; 43 Rick Sutcliffe; 36 Rick Waits; 32 Ed Whitson; 25 Sandy Wihtol	Catchers: 23 Chris Bando; 9 Ron Hassey; 15 Bill Nahorodny; Infielders: 10 Jerry Dybzinski; 22 Mike Fischlin; 21 Mike Hargrove; 11 Toby Harrah; 17 Larry Milbourne; 30 Karl Pagel; 16 Jack Perconte	Outfielders: 7 Alan Bannister; 52 Carmen Castillo; 34 Joe Charboneau; 56,24 Rod Craig; 27 Miguel Diloné; 8 Von Hayes; 20 Rick Manning; 26 Bake McBride; 54 Kevin Rhomberg; Other batters: 29 Andre Thornton	Manager: 1 Dave Garcia; Coaches: 4 Johnny Goryl (Third Base); 14 Tom McCraw (Hitting); 6 Mel Queen (Pitching); 2 Dennis Sommers (First Base)

== Game log ==
=== Regular season ===
1982 regular season game log: 78–84 (Home: 41–40; Away: 37–44)
April: 8–10 (Home: 6–6; Away: 2–4)

#	Date	Time (ET)	Opponent	Score	Win	Loss	Save	Time of Game	Attendance	Record	Box/ Streak

May: 15–13 (Home: 6–5; Away: 9–8)

#	Date	Time (ET)	Opponent	Score	Win	Loss	Save	Time of Game	Attendance	Record	Box/ Streak

June: 13–13 (Home: 7–4; Away: 6–9)

#	Date	Time (ET)	Opponent	Score	Win	Loss	Save	Time of Game	Attendance	Record	Box/ Streak

July: 13–14 (Home: 6–10; Away: 7–4)

#	Date	Time (ET)	Opponent	Score	Win	Loss	Save	Time of Game	Attendance	Record	Box/ Streak

August: 12–17 (Home: 8–5; Away: 4–12)

#	Date	Time (ET)	Opponent	Score	Win	Loss	Save	Time of Game	Attendance	Record	Box/ Streak

September: 15–14 (Home: 6–7; Away: 9–7)

#	Date	Time (ET)	Opponent	Score	Win	Loss	Save	Time of Game	Attendance	Record	Box/ Streak

October: 2–3 (Home: 2–3; Away: 0–0)

#	Date	Time (ET)	Opponent	Score	Win	Loss	Save	Time of Game	Attendance	Record	Box/ Streak

== Player stats ==
=== Batting ===
Note: G = Games played; AB = At bats; R = Runs scored; H = Hits; 2B = Doubles; 3B = Triples; HR = Home runs; RBI = Runs batted in; AVG = Batting average; SB = Stolen bases

Player	G	AB	R	H	2B	3B	HR	RBI	AVG	SB
Chris Bando	66	184	13	39	6	1	3	16	.212	0
Alan Bannister	101	348	40	93	16	1	4	41	.267	18
Carmelo Castillo	47	120	11	25	4	0	2	11	.208	0
Joe Charbonneau	22	56	7	12	2	1	2	9	.214	0
Rod Craig	49	65	7	15	2	0	0	1	.231	3
Miguel Dilone	104	379	50	89	12	3	3	25	.235	33
Jerry Dybzinski	80	212	19	49	6	2	0	22	.231	3
Mike Fischlin	112	276	34	74	12	1	0	21	.268	9
Mike Hargrove	160	591	67	160	26	1	4	65	.271	2
Toby Harrah	162	602	100	183	29	4	25	78	.304	17
Ron Hassey	113	323	33	81	18	0	5	34	.251	3
Von Hayes	150	527	65	132	25	3	14	82	.250	32
Rick Manning	152	562	71	152	18	2	8	44	.270	12
Bake McBride	27	85	8	31	3	3	0	13	.365	2
Larry Milbourne	82	291	29	80	11	4	2	25	.275	2
Bill Nahorodny	39	94	6	21	5	1	4	18	.223	0
Karl Pagel	23	18	3	3	0	0	0	2	.167	0
Jack Perconte	93	219	27	52	4	4	0	15	.237	9
Kevin Rhomberg	16	18	3	6	0	0	1	1	.333	0
Andre Thornton	161	589	90	161	26	1	32	116	.273	6
Team totals	162	5559	683	1458	225	32	109	639	.262	151

=== Pitching ===
= Indicates league leader

Note: W = Wins; L = Losses; ERA = Earned run average; G = Games pitched; GS = Games started; SV = Saves; IP = Innings pitched; H = Hits allowed; R = Runs allowed; ER = Earned runs allowed; BB = Walks allowed; K = Strikeouts

Player	W	L	ERA	G	GS	SV	IP	H	R	ER	BB	K
Bud Anderson	3	4	3.35	25	5	0	80.2	84	37	30	30	44
Len Barker	15	11	3.90	33	33	0	244.2	211	117	106	88	187
Bert Blyleven	2	2	4.87	4	4	0	20.1	16	14	11	11	19
John Bohnet	0	0	6.94	3	3	0	11.2	11	9	9	7	4
Tom Brennan	4	2	4.27	30	4	2	92.2	112	51	44	10	46
John Denny	6	11	5.01	21	21	0	138.1	126	80	77	73	94
Ed Glynn	5	2	4.17	47	0	4	49.2	43	27	23	30	54
Neal Heaton	0	2	5.23	8	4	0	31.0	32	21	18	16	14
Dennis Lewallyn	0	1	6.97	4	0	0	10.1	13	8	8	1	3
Jerry Reed	1	1	3.45	6	1	0	15.2	15	6	6	3	10
Lary Sorensen	10	15	5.61	32	30	0	189.1	251	130	118	55	62
Dan Spillner	12	10	2.49	65	0	21	133.2	117	44	37	45	90
Rick Sutcliffe	14	8	2.96	34	27	1	216.0	174	81	71	98	142
Rick Waits	2	13	5.40	25	21	0	115.0	128	74	69	57	44
Ed Whitson	4	2	3.26	40	9	2	107.2	91	43	39	58	61
Sandy Wihtol	0	0	4.63	6	0	0	11.2	9	6	6	7	8
Team totals	78	84	4.11	162	162	30	1468.1	1433	748	670	589	882

== Awards and honors ==
- Andre Thornton, Hutch Award

All-Star Game

== Farm system ==
Level	Team	League	Manager
AAA	Charleston Charlies	International League	Doc Edwards
AA	Chattanooga Lookouts	Southern League	Al Gallagher
A	Waterloo Indians	Midwest League	Gomer Hodge
A-Short Season	Batavia Trojans	New York–Penn League	Dave Oliver
