= 1977 Caribbean Series =

1977 baseball tournament

The twentieth edition of the Caribbean Series (Serie del Caribe) was played in 1977. It was held from February 4 through February 9 with the champions teams from the Dominican Republic, Tigres del Licey; Mexico, Venados de Mazatlán; Puerto Rico, Criollos de Caguas and Venezuela, Navegantes del Magallanes. The format consisted of 12 games, each team facing the other teams twice, and the games were played at UCV Stadium in Caracas, Venezuela.

== Summary ==
The Dominican team was represented by the Tigres del Licey and finished with a perfect record of 6–0. Managed by Buck Rodgers, the team received strong support from Series MVP Rico Carty, who led the hitters in runs (8) and RBI (10), while setting a new Series record with five home runs. Starters Ed Halicki and Odell Jones both earned two wins apiece, and Stan Wall led a bullpen that included Pedro Borbón, Rob Dressler and Ike Hampton. Other players included C Freddie Velázquez, IFs Bob Beall, Mario Guerrero, Ted Martínez and Rennie Stennett, as well as OFs Jesús Alou, Jim Dwyer, Rafael Landestoy, Manny Mota and Sam Mejías.

The Navegantes del Magallanes of Venezuela were managed by Don Leppert and finished second with a 3–3 record. LF Félix Rodríguez won the batting title (.522) and led the team in RBI (6), while receiving help from RF Mitchell Page (.381, two HRs, five RBI), DH Dave Parker (.346, one HR, three RBI) and 1B Cito Gaston (.300, four RBI). Other than SP Paul Reuschel (2–0, 0.50 ERA, two complete games) and RP Manny Sarmiento (1–0, 3.00 ERA), the pitching staff had an undistinguished performance. Also in the roster were Chris Batton (P), Bo Díaz (C), Jamie Easterly (P), Wayne Granger (P), Gus Gil (IF), Remy Hermoso (DH), Mike Kekich (P), Ken Macha (3B), Oswaldo Olivares (OF), Jimmy Sexton (SS), and Manny Trillo (2B).

Managed by Alfredo Ortiz, the Venados de Mazatlán represented Mexico and went 2–4 to end in third place. The most significant contribution came from LHP George Brunet, who was credited with the two victories of Mexico, a team that batted a paltry .218, including homers by 1B Héctor Espino and OF Jeffrey Leonard, while committing a Series-leading 14 errors. Other members of the roster were Mike Dimmel (OF), Rex Hudson (P), Max León (P), Bobby Treviño (DH) and Ron Washington (SS), among others.

The Criollos de Caguas of Puerto Rico finished last with a 1–5 record. Managed by Doc Edwards, the team batted a collective .253 average with five home runs and was outscored by their opponents 33–19, even though the roster was filled with Ps Mike Cuellar, Joe Henderson, Willie Hernández, Eduardo Rodríguez, Mike Krukow, Dennis Martínez and Ed Whitson; IFs Kurt Bevacqua, Julio González, Félix Millán and Eddie Murray; OFs José Cruz, Sixto Lezcano and Jerry Morales; C John Wockenfuss, and utilities Iván de Jesús, José Morales and Tony Scott.

Final standings
Club	W	L	W/L %	GB	Managers
Dominican Republic	6	0	1.000	–	Buck Rodgers
Venezuela	3	3	.500	3.0	Don Leppert
Mexico	2	4	.333	4.0	Alfredo Ortiz
Puerto Rico	1	5	.167	5.0	Doc Edwards

Individual leaders
Player/Club	Statistic
Félix Rodríguez / VEN	Batting average	.522
Félix Rodríguez / VEN	Hits	12
Four tied	Doubles	2
Three tied	Triples	1
Rico Carty / DOM	Home runs	5
Rico Carty / DOM	Runs	8
Rico Carty / DOM	RBI	10
Five tied	Stolen bases	1
George Brunet / MEX; Ed Halicki / DOM; Odell Jones / DOM; Rick Reuschel / VEN	Wins	2
Rick Reuschel / VEN	Strikeouts	8
Rick Reuschel / VEN	ERA	0.50
Fernando López / MEX	Saves	2
Rick Reuschel / VEN	Innings pitched	18.0
Awards
Rico Carty / DOM	Most Valuable Player
Buck Rodgers / DOM	Manager

All-Star Team
Name/Club	Position
John Wockenfuss / PUR	catcher
Cito Gaston / VEN	first baseman
Félix Millán / PUR	second baseman
Ted Martínez / DOM	third baseman
Mario Guerrero / DOM	shortstop
Félix Rodríguez / VEN	left fielder
Albino Diaz / MEX	center fielder
Rico Carty / DOM	right fielder
Rico Carty / DOM	designated hitter
Ed Halicki / DOM	RH pitcher
Stan Wall / DOM	LH pitcher
Buck Rodgers / DOM	manager

=== Scoreboards ===
==== Game 1, February 4 ====
Team	1	2	3	4	5	6	7	8	9	R	H	E
Puerto Rico	1	0	0	0	0	0	0	0	1	2	8	1
Dominican Republic	3	0	1	2	0	0	0	0	x	6	6	1
WP: Ed Halicki (1-0) LP: Eduardo Rodríguez (0-1); Home runs: PUR: None; DOM: Rico Carty (1), Manny Mota (1)

==== Game 2, February 4 ====
Team	1	2	3	4	5	6	7	8	9	R	H	E
Mexico	0	0	0	0	0	0	0	0	0	0	3	2
Venezuela	1	0	1	1	0	0	1	0	x	4	9	2
WP: Paul Reuschel (1-0) LP: Max León (0-1); Home runs: MEX: None; VEN: Mitchell Page (1); Notes: Reuschel pitched a complete game shutout.

==== Game 3, February 5 ====
Team	1	2	3	4	5	6	7	8	9	R	H	E
Mexico	0	0	0	0	0	0	0	0	0	0	7	2
Dominican Republic	4	3	0	0	0	0	3	0	x	10	16	2
WP: Odell Jones (1-0) LP: Rex Hudson (0-1); Home runs: MEX: None; DOM: Rico Carty (2)

==== Game 4, February 5 ====
Team	1	2	3	4	5	6	7	8	9	10	R	H	E
Puerto Rico	0	1	0	0	1	1	4	1	0	1	9	14	2
Venezuela	2	0	2	2	1	0	0	0	1	0	8	16	2
WP: Joe Henderson (1-0) LP: Wayne Granger (0-1); Home runs: PUR: José Cruz (1), Kurt Bevacqua (1); VEN: Dave Parker (1)

==== Game 5, February 6 ====
Team	1	2	3	4	5	6	7	8	9	R	H	E
Puerto Rico	0	0	0	0	0	1	0	0	o	1	8	2
Mexico	0	0	1	0	0	0	0	1	x	2	5	1
WP: George Brunet (1-0) LP: Ed Whitson (0-1) Sv: Fernando López (1); Home runs: PUR: Jerry Morales (1); MEX: None

==== Game 6, February 6 ====
Team	1	2	3	4	5	6	7	8	9	R	H	E
Dominican Republic	2	0	0	1	0	0	0	0	0	3	5	1
Venezuela	0	0	0	0	0	0	0	0	0	0	5	1
WP: Pedro Borbón (1-0) LP: Chris Batton (0-1) Sv: Stan Wall (1); Home runs: DOM: Rico Carty (3); VEN: None; Notes: Borbón (5 H, 5 K, 1 W, 6.1 IP) and Wall (0 H, 5 K, 0 W, 2.2 IP) pitched a combined shutout.

==== Game 7, February 7 ====
Team	1	2	3	4	5	6	7	8	9	R	H	E
Dominican Republic	2	0	0	0	0	0	1	0	0	3	7	0
Puerto Rico	0	1	1	0	0	0	0	0	0	2	7	0
WP: Rob Dressler (1-0) LP: Mike Krukow (0-1) Sv: Stan Wall (2); Home runs: DOM: Rico Carty (4); PUR: None

==== Game 8, February 7 ====
Team	1	2	3	4	5	6	7	8	9	R	H	E
Venezuela	2	0	3	0	2	1	0	1	0	9	10	3
Mexico	0	1	1	2	0	1	0	0	0	5	12	3
WP: Manny Sarmiento (1-0) LP: René Chávez (0-1); Home runs: VEN: None; MEX: Jeffrey Leonard (1)

==== Game 9, February 8 ====
Team	1	2	3	4	5	6	7	8	9	R	H	E
Dominican Republic	0	1	6	4	5	0	0	1	1	18	23	3
Mexico	0	0	0	0	0	0	2	0	2	4	13	5
WP: Ed Halicki (2-0) LP: Fernando López (0-1); Home runs: DOM: Bob Beall (1); MEX: Héctor Espino (1)

==== Game 10, February 8 ====
Team	1	2	3	4	5	6	7	8	9	R	H	E
Venezuela	0	3	0	5	0	0	1	0	0	9	13	3
Puerto Rico	0	0	0	0	0	0	1	0	0	1	4	4
WP: Paul Reuschel (2-0) LP: Eduardo Rodríguez (0-2); Home runs: VEN: Mitchell Page (2); PUR: Sixto Lezcano (1); Notes: Reuschel pitched his second complete game.

==== Game 11, February 9 ====
Team	1	2	3	4	5	6	7	8	9	R	H	E
Mexico	0	0	0	0	0	1	4	0	0	5	8	1
Puerto Rico	0	0	1	0	0	3	0	0	0	4	4	1
WP: George Brunet (2-0) LP: Dennis Martínez (0-1) Sv: Fernando López (2); Home runs: MEX: None; PUR: Sixto Lezcano (2)

==== Game 12, February 9 ====
Team	1	2	3	4	5	6	7	8	9	R	H	E
Venezuela	0	0	0	0	0	0	0	0	1	1	7	1
Dominican Republic	0	2	0	0	0	1	0	2	x	5	11	1
WP: Odell Jones (2-0) LP: Mike Kekich (0-1); Home runs: VEN: None; DOM: Rico Carty (5), Jesús Alou (1); Notes: With his fifth home run, Carty surpassed the record of four homers in the Series set by Willard Brown in the 1953 edition.

== See also ==
- Ballplayers who have played in the Series

== Sources ==
- Antero Núñez, José. Series del Caribe. Impresos Urbina, Caracas, Venezuela.
- Araujo Bojórquez, Alfonso. Series del Caribe: Narraciones y estadísticas, 1949-2001. Colegio de Bachilleres del Estado de Sinaloa, Mexico.
- Figueredo, Jorge S. Cuban Baseball: A Statistical History, 1878–1961. Macfarland & Co., United States.
- González Echevarría, Roberto. The Pride of Havana. Oxford University Express.
- Gutiérrez, Daniel. Enciclopedia del Béisbol en Venezuela, Caracas, Venezuela.
