= 1980 Caribbean Series =

1980 baseball tournament

The twenty-third edition of the Caribbean Series (Serie del Caribe) was played in 1980. It was held from February 2 through February 7 with the champions teams from Dominican Republic (Tigres del Licey), Mexico (Naranjeros de Hermosillo), Puerto Rico (Vaqueros de Bayamón) and Venezuela (Leones del Caracas). The format consisted of 12 games, each team facing the other teams twice. The games were played at Estadio Quisqueya in Santo Domingo, D.R., which boosted capacity to 14.000 seats, and the first pitch was thrown by Antonio Guzmán, by then the President of Dominican Republic.

== Summary ==
Dominican Republic won the tournament with a 4–2 record. The Licey club was guided by manager Del Crandall and led by center fielder and Series MVP Rudy Law, who was joined by fellows Leon Durham (1B), Jerry Dybzinski (SS), Dámaso García (2B), Dennis Lewallyn (P) and Teodoro Martínez (3B) on the Series All-Star team. The victories came from starters Dennis Lewallyn (1–0, five-hit, 10-inning shutout), Joaquín Andújar (1–0, 1.29 ERA, seven strikeouts in 7.0 innings), Gerry Hannahs (1–0, 0.00 in seven innings) and reliever Chuck Fore (1–0, 0.00 in four innings). In addition to pitchers Carlos Pérez and Mario Soto, also were in the roster RF Mickey Hatcher, C Mike Scioscia, and utilities Jesús Alou, Rico Carty, Miguel Diloné, César Gerónimo, Pedro Guerrero and Tony Peña. It was the fourth title both for the Dominican Republic and the Licey club.

Puerto Rico, piloted by Art Howe, posted a 3–3 record to tie the second place with Venezuela. RF Héctor Cruz won the batting title with a .444 average (8-for-18) and the pitching staff was led by Dave Smith (2–0, 14 SO, 3.37 ERA). The Bayamón team also featured Luis Aguayo (IF), Dave Bergman (1B), Tony Bernazard (IF), Doug Corbett (P), Frank LaCorte (P), Eliseo Rodríguez (C) José Morales (DH), Dickie Thon (IF) and Denny Walling (OF).

Venezuela, with Felipe Alou at the helm, was anchored by leadoff hitter Oswaldo Olivares (.348 BA, eight runs, .478 SLG), RF Dwayne Murphy (.333 BA, .476 SLG, three stolen bases), SS Dave Concepción (.318, four RBI) and rookie OF Tony Armas, who hit a grand slam and led his team with five RBI. The pitching staff included starters Diego Seguí (1–0, 0.00 in seven innings), Pablo Torrealba (1–0, 2.34 in 7 2/3 innings), Luis Leal (0–1, 1.86 in 9 2/3 innings), and reliever Luis Peñalver (1–0, 0.77 in 11 2/3 innings). Other players for Caracas club included Ángel Bravo (OF), Víctor Davalillo (DH), Baudilio Díaz (C), Andrés Galarraga (OF), Ubaldo Heredia (P), Leonardo Hernández (IF), Ken Phelps (1B), Jerry Manuel (3B), Craig Skok (RP), Mike Stanton (SP), Ralph Treuel (SP), Manny Trillo (2B) and Sandy Wihtol (RP).

Mexico finished in last place with a 2–4 record and was managed by Cananea Reyes. The pitching staff was clearly led by Roberto Castillo, who recorded a nine-inning, one-run victory and a four-inning save for a 0.69 ERA, while Vicente Romo got the other win with a two-run, five-inning effort. The Hermosillo team also featured veteran slugger Héctor Espino, C Sergio Robles, C/3B Alex Treviño, 2B Bump Wills, RF Jim Tracy, as well as pitchers Aurelio López, Randy Niemann and Dave Stewart, among others.

Final standings
Club	W	L	W/L %	GB
Dominican Republic	4	2	.667	–
Puerto Rico	3	3	.500	1.0
Venezuela	3	3	.500	1.0
Mexico	2	4	.333	2.0

Individual leaders
Player/Club	Statistic
Héctor Cruz / PRI	Batting average	.444
Tony Armas / VEN; Leon Durham / DOM; Héctor Espino / MEX; Ken Phelps / VEN; Bump Wills / MEX	Home runs	one each
Oswaldo Olivares / VEN	Runs	6
José Morales / PRI; Oswaldo Olivares / VEN	Hits	8
Dwayne Murphy / VEN	Doubles	3
Six tied	Triples	1
Dwayne Murphy / VEN	Stolen bases	3
Dave Smith / PRI	Wins	2
Dave Smith / PRI	Strikeouts	14
Dennis Lewallyn / DOM	Earned run average	0.00
Roberto Castillo / MEX	Saves	1
Roberto Castillo / MEX	Innings pitched	13.0
Awards
Rudy Law / DOM	Most Valuable Player
Del Crandall / DOM	Manager

All-Star Team
Name/Club	Position
Eliseo Rodríguez / PRI	catcher
Leon Durham / DOM	first baseman
Dámaso García / DOM	second baseman
Teodoro Martínez / DOM	third baseman
Jerry Dybzinski / DOM / CUB	shortstop
Oswaldo Olivares / VEN	left fielder
Rudy Law / DOM	center fielder
Héctor Cruz / PRI	right fielder
José Morales / PRI	designated hitter
Dennis Lewallyn / DOM	RH pitcher
Pablo Torrealba / VEN	LH pitcher
Del Crandall / DOM	manager

== Scoreboards ==
=== Game 1, February 2 ===
Team	1	2	3	4	5	6	7	8	9	R	H	E
Venezuela	0	0	0	0	0	0	2	0	0	2	9	2
Puerto Rico	0	0	2	0	0	1	1	2	X	6	11	0
WP: Dave Smith (1–0) LP: Mike Stanton (0–1)

=== Game 2, February 2 ===
Team	1	2	3	4	5	6	7	8	9	R	H	E
Mexico	0	0	0	0	0	0	0	0	0	0	3	2
Dominican Republic	2	0	1	0	1	2	0	0	X	6	11	1
WP: Gerry Hannahs (1–0) LP: Randy Niemann (0–1); Home runs: MEX: None; DOM: Leon Durham (1)

=== Game 3, February 3 ===
Team	1	2	3	4	5	6	7	8	9	R	H	E
Puerto Rico	1	0	0	0	0	0	0	0	0	1	5	4
Mexico	1	0	0	4	0	0	0	0	X	5	7	1
WP: Roberto Castillo (1–0) LP: Dennis Kinney (0–1); Home runs: PRI: None; MEX: Bump Wills (1)

=== Game 4, February 3 ===
Team	1	2	3	4	5	6	7	8	9	R	H	E
Dominican Republic	0	1	0	0	0	0	0	2	0	3	9	0
Venezuela	0	0	0	0	0	0	1	0	0	1	6	2
WP: Joaquín Andújar (1–0) LP: Luis Leal (0–1)

=== Game 5, February 4 ===
Team	1	2	3	4	5	6	7	8	9	R	H	E
Venezuela	0	0	0	1	2	0	2	1	1	7	10	2
Mexico	0	1	2	0	0	0	0	0	0	3	10	1
WP: Luis Peñalver (1–0) LP: Aurelio López (0–1); Home runs: VEN: Ken Phelps (1); MEX: Héctor Espino (1)

=== Game 6, February 4 ===
Team	1	2	3	4	5	6	7	8	9	10	R	H	E
Puerto Rico	0	0	0	0	0	0	0	0	0		0	5	2
Dominican Republic	0	0	0	0	0	0	0	0	0	1	1	10	0
WP: Dennis Lewallyn (1–0) LP: Doug Corbett (0–1)

=== Game 7, February 5 ===
Team	1	2	3	4	5	6	7	8	9	R	H	E
Puerto Rico	1	0	0	0	0	0	0	2	0	3	12	
Venezuela	1	0	1	3	0	0	0	0	X	5	5	1
WP: Diego Seguí (1–0) LP: Frank LaCorte (0–1)

=== Game 8, February 5 ===
Team	1	2	3	4	5	6	7	8	9	R	H	E
Dominican Republic	3	0	4	1	3	0	0	0	0	11	18	1
Mexico	0	0	3	0	0	0	0	0	0	3	8	3
WP: Chuck Fore (1–0) LP: Dave Stewart (0–1)

=== Game 9, February 6 ===
Team	1	2	3	4	5	6	7	8	9	R	H	E
Mexico	0	0	3	0	0	0	0	0	0	3	6	0
Puerto Rico	0	1	2	1	0	0	6	0	X	10	16	0
WP: Dennis Kinney (1–1) LP: Randy Niemann (0–2)

=== Game 10, February 6 ===
Team	1	2	3	4	5	6	7	8	9	R	H	E
Venezuela	0	0	0	0	0	0	4	0	0	4	8	0
Dominican Republic	0	0	2	0	0	0	0	0	X	2	7	0
WP: Pablo Torrealba (1–0) LP: Mario Soto (0–1); Home runs: VEN: Tony Armas (1); DOM: None

=== Game 11, February 7 ===
Team	1	2	3	4	5	6	7	8	9	R	H	E
Mexico	0	0	4	0	0	0	0	0	0	4	9	0
Venezuela	1	0	0	0	0	1	0	0	0	2	8	1
WP: Vicente Romo (1–0) LP: Mike Stanton (0–2) Sv: Roberto Castillo (1)

=== Game 12, February 7 ===
Team	1	2	3	4	5	6	7	8	9	R	H	E
Dominican Republic	0	1	0	0	2	0	0	0	0	3	7	2
Puerto Rico	3	3	0	2	0	1	0	0	X	9	12	2
WP: Dave Smith (2–0) LP: Bill Swiacki (0–1)

== See also ==
- Ballplayers who have played in the Series

== Sources ==
- Antero Núñez, José. Series del Caribe. Jefferson, Caracas, Venezuela: Impresos Urbina, C.A., 1987.
- Gutiérrez, Daniel. Enciclopedia del Béisbol en Venezuela – 1895–2006 . Caracas, Venezuela: Impresión Arte, C.A., 2007.
