= Jerry White (baseball) =

American baseball player (born 1952)

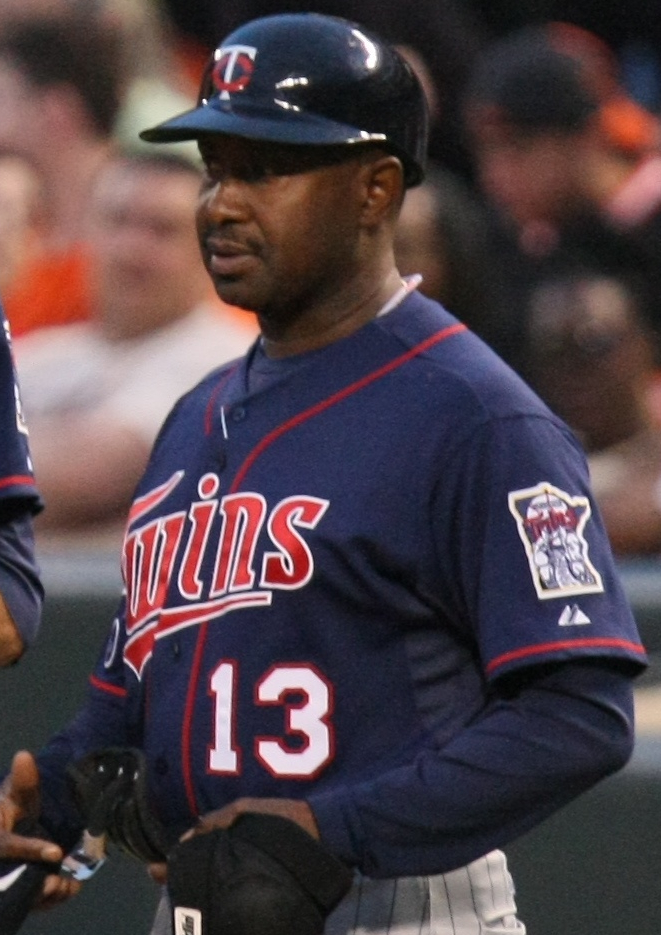
- White as Twins first base coach in 2009
- Outfielder
- Born: August 23, 1952 (age 74); Shirley, Massachusetts, U.S.
- Batted: Both Threw: Right

Professional debut
- MLB: September 16, 1974, for the Montreal Expos
- NPB: 1984, for the Seibu Lions

Last appearance
- NPB: 1985, for the Yokohama Taiyo Whales
- MLB: June 9, 1986, for the St. Louis Cardinals

MLB statistics
- Batting average: .253
- Home runs: 21
- Runs batted in: 109

NPB statistics
- Batting average: .251
- Home runs: 37
- Runs batted in: 113
- Stats at Baseball Reference

Teams
- Montreal Expos (1974–1978); Chicago Cubs (1978); Montreal Expos (1979–1983); Seibu Lions (1984); Yokohama Taiyo Whales (1985); St. Louis Cardinals (1986)

Member of the Caribbean

Baseball Hall of Fame
- Induction: 2006

Jerome Cardell White (born August 23, 1952) is an American former professional baseball outfielder and coach. Born in Shirley, Massachusetts, White was listed at 5' 10", 164 lb., White was a switch hitter and threw right handed. He spent 11 seasons in Major League Baseball (MLB), including stints with the Montreal Expos, Chicago Cubs, and St. Louis Cardinals. Additionally, White played two seasons in Nippon Professional Baseball (NPB) with the Seibu Lions and Yokohama Taiyo Whales. He later worked as the bench coach in the 1995 season then as the first base coach of the Minnesota Twins in a span of 14 seasons from 1998–2012.

== Professional career ==
=== Player ===
White was selected by the Montreal Expos in the 14th round (322nd overall) of the 1970 Major League Baseball draft out of San Francisco's Washington High School. He made his major league debut on September 16, 1974 at Montreal's Jarry Park, starting in center field and going 0-for-2 in a 3–2 Expos' loss to the New York Mets.

White's first full major league season came in 1976, as he hit .245 with two home runs and 21 RBI in 114 games with the Expos. On June 23, 1978, he was traded to the Chicago Cubs to complete an earlier deal made on June 9, 1978, in which the Expos acquired pitcher Woodie Fryman as the player to be named later.

White spent only 59 games in a Cubs' uniform, batting .272 with a home run and 10 RBI. On December 14, 1978, he was traded back to the Expos along with second baseman Rodney Scott in exchange for outfielder Sam Mejías.

In December 1985, White signed as a free agent with the St. Louis Cardinals. He made his final major league appearance on June 9, 1986, ironically against the Montreal Expos, the team he spent the majority of his professional career with.

In 646 games over 11 seasons, White posted a .253 batting average (303-for-1,196) with 155 runs, 21 home runs, 109 RBI, 57 stolen bases and 148 bases on balls. He finished his career with a .974 fielding percentage playing at all three outfield positions. In the 1981 postseason, he hit .235 (8-for-34) with five runs, a home run, 4 RBI, four stolen bases and five walks.

=== Winter Leagues ===
In between, White played winter ball with the Navegantes del Magallanes and Águilas del Zulia clubs of the Venezuelan League in the 1978–79 and 1983-84 seasons, respectively. A career highlight came in the 1979 Caribbean Series with the Venezuelan champion Magallanes, when White was the only player in the tournament with at least one hit in each game, leading the hitters with a .522 average, 12 hits, five runs, 4 RBI, a .607 on-base percentage, a .783 slugging percentage, and a 1.370 OPS.

=== Coaching ===
Following his playing career, White was hired as the first base coach of the Minnesota Twins in 1998. In October 2012, after two consecutive seasons of 90+ losses, the Twins' front office decided to shake things up by releasing or reassigning six of seven coaches, including White.

== Honors ==
In February 2006, White was enshrined into the Caribbean Baseball Hall of Fame along with Dave Concepción (Venezuela), Pedro Formental (Cuba) and Celerino Sánchez (México), for their notable contributions to the Caribbean Series. During the ceremony, Chico Carrasquel and Emilio Cueche (both from Venezuela) also were honored.

== Personal ==
White has two sons, Justin and Jerome, and a daughter, Noell.

== Sources ==
Sporting positions
Preceded by Wayne Terwilliger	Minnesota Twins first base coach 1995	Succeeded by Ron Gardenhire
Preceded by Ron Gardenhire	Minnesota Twins first base coach 1999–2012	Succeeded by Scott Ullger
