= Oswaldo Olivares =

Venezuelan baseball player (born 1953)

- Outfielder
- Born: September 15, 1953 (age 72); Caracas, Venezuela
- Bats: Left Throws: Left

Career highlights and awards
- Carolina League batting champion (1977); Carolina League All-Star (1977); Venezuelan League Rookie of the Year (1975-76); Venezuelan League batting champion (1984-85); Mexican League batting champion (1985); Caribbean Series champion (1979); Caribbean Series All-Star (1979); Caribbean Baseball Hall of Fame (2007)

Member of the Venezuelan

Baseball Hall of Fame
- Induction: 2009

Oswaldo Alberto Olivares [o-lee-var'-res] (born September 15, 1953) is a Venezuelan former professional outfielder. Listed at 5' 11" (1.82 m), 154 lb. (70 k.), Olivares batted and threw left handed. He was born in Caracas.

A member of two Halls of Fame, Olivares spent 20 years in baseball and was a reliable player whom managers could use as a leadoff hitter for his ability to get on base, hit for average and run the bases aggressively, which he combined with his speed, strong arm and steady defense at three outfield positions. Although he never reached Major League Baseball as a player, Olivares was a fixture at Minor League level, the summer Mexican League and winter ball in Venezuela, amassing over 2,500 career hits and walking off with one batting crown in each place.

== Minor leagues ==
The New York Mets signed 18-year Olivares as an amateur free agent before the 1973 season. He posted a slash line of .319/.385/.511 with seven runs and nine RBI over 47 at-bats in just 18 games for Rookie class Marion Mets. He had a 3-1 record with a 4.06 ERA as a part-time pitcher as well. But after being used sparingly during four years, the Mets dealt Olivares to the Pittsburgh Pirates in early 1977, which was his breakthrough season.

Assigned to Class-A Salem Pirates, Olivares led the Carolina League with a .370 batting average, 208 hits, 14 triples and 46 stolen bases in 138 games. He also topped the league in outfield putouts (254) and was second in outfield assists (18), earning the Carolina League Most Valuable Player Award as well as being named to the postseason All-Star Team. Notably, his .370 average was the highest in the Pirates entire system and the 12th best in all of minor league baseball in the 1977 season. Besides, he topped the Pirates minor leaguers in runs (122), hits and triples, ending second in steals and fourth in RBI (80). In addition, he set Salem franchise all-time season records in average, hits and total bases (280), which currently remains intact. He then finished the season hitting .400 (6-for-15) in four games at Triple-A Columbus Clippers.

Olivares spent four more years in the Pittsburgh Minor League system, jumping between Double-A and Triple-A levels, battling to reach the Major Leagues. But at the time, the organization had an outfield composed of Bill Robinson, Omar Moreno and Dave Parker, members of the 1979 Pirates world champion team, as well as Miguel Diloné and Mike Easler in the list of top prospects. As a result, the Pirates had so many outfielders in their system that Olivares got no playing time, so he asked to be released.

In a seven-season minor-league career, Olivares hit a .301/.380/.765 line in 1,884 at bats, collecting 567 hits, 62 doubles, 29 triples, 13 homers and 115 steals over 520 game appearances.

== Winter baseball ==
Olivares started his career in the Venezuelan Professional Baseball League in the 1973-74 season, following his brief stint in the Mets Minor League system during the summer. He debuted with the Navegantes del Magallanes, playing for them eight seasons before joining the Tigres de Aragua from 1981-82 through 1988-89. He then returned to Magallanes from 1989-90 to 1991-92, and finished his career with the Petroleros de Cabimas in the 1992-93 season.

Olivares saw little action during his first two seasons in the Venezuelan league, but won Rookie of the Year honors in the 1975-76 campaign. Overall, he hit an average of .300 or more in six seasons, with a career-high .352 in 1984-85 to earn the batting title, defeating Ozzie Guillén (.333), as well as Luis Salazar and Ron Shepherd (.313 apiece). Olivares also led the league with 77 hits, one ahead of Joe Orsulak, and tied Shepperd for third with 35 runs scored.

In a 20-season career, Olivares posted a .289 average and slugged .353 in 981 games, scoring 514 runs with 281 RBI, while collecting 98 doubles, 57 triples, one home run and 113 stolen bases. So as for the records, he holds the most career triples in VPBL history, ranks fourth in runs, fifth in games, eighth in hits, and is tied for sixth with Luis Salazar in stolen bases.

In addition, Olivares played in four consecutives Caribbean Series, appearing with the VPBL champion Magallanes 1977 and 1979, winning the Series Championship in 1979. In that Series, he hit .432 with seven RBI, made the All-Star team and had four outfield assists, including two throw outs at home plate in a decisive 2–1, 10-inning victory over the eventual runner-up Águilas Cibaeñas. In between, he was signed as a reinforcement prior to the 1978 and 1980 editions to be the regular left fielder for the VPBL title-winning Leones del Caracas. In 19 Series games, Olivares hit .371 (23-for-62) with a pair of triples and three stolen bases, driving in 11 runs while scoring 14 times.

== Mexican league ==
A short time after his appearance the 1980 Caribbean Series, Olivares signed a contract to play for the Plataneros de Tabasco club in the Mexican League, hitting for them .369 (7-for-19) with two runs scored in just five games. Afterwards, he would collect a batting average of .300 or more in seven of his next eight seasons in the league. He was slated to platoon early and registered averages of .328 (1981) and .317 (1982) in a part-time outfield role, before improving to .366 (1983) and .349 (1984) while playing on a regular basis.

His most productive season came in 1985 while playing for the Rieleros de Aguascalientes and Alacranes de Campeche, when he hit a career-high .397 average in 110 games, to claim his second batting crown in under 12 months and his third overall title, as was aforementioned. Additionally, he posted a .462 OBP, slugged .526, and also led the league in hits (175) and triples (14). Furthermore, his .397 season average was the best in all Organized baseball.

The next three seasons Olivares continued his solid performance, hitting .333 and .365 in 1986 and 1987, respectively. He returned to his former Tabasco team in 1988, a perfect fit for his last season in the league, hitting .298 in 114 games before returning to his native Venezuela for three more winter seasons.

In a 10-season Mexican League career, Olivares hit a .345/.432/.459 line with 613 runs scored and 318 RBI in 830 games, including 1,061 hits, 132 doubles, 72 triples, 25 homers and 154 steals.

In addition to Aguascalientes, Campeche and Tabasco, Olivares also played for the Azules de Coatzacoalcos, Bravos de León, Cafeteros de Córdoba, Indios de Ciudad Juárez, Leones de Yucatán, Saraperos de Saltillo and Tigres del México. A disciplined line-drive hitter that considered every ball and strike count while at bat, he received more walks (464) than strikeouts (227) in 3,073 at-bats, for a solid 2.044 walk-to-strikeout ratio in his Mexican stint.

== After baseball ==
After his retirement from baseball, Olivares succeed as an entrepreneur in the world of business, founding a clothing company and a sporting apparel shop.

In 2007, Olivares received a great honor when he was enshrined into the Caribbean Baseball Hall of Fame along with baseball legends Nelson Barrera, Héctor Cruz and Edgar Martínez. He later gained induction in the Venezuelan Baseball Hall of Fame and Museum as part of its 2009 class.
