= Black Aces =

Group of black Major League Baseball pitchers

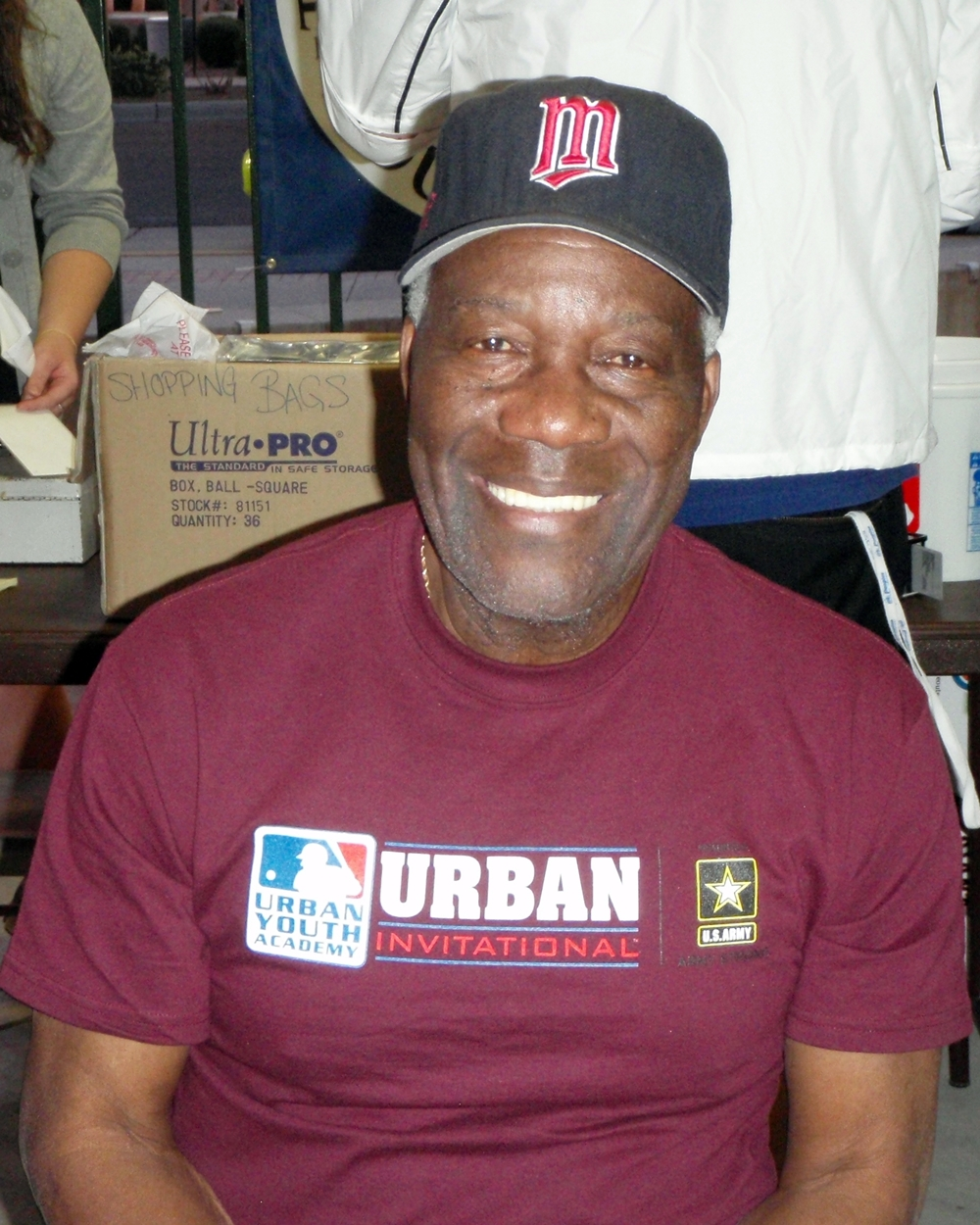
Mudcat Grant in 2011

The Black Aces are a group of African-American and African-Canadian pitchers who have won at least 20 games during a single Major League Baseball (MLB) season. The term comes from the title of a 2007 book by MLB pitcher Mudcat Grant (1935–2021), one of the members of the group. Through the 2024 MLB season, 14 different African-American and 1 African-Canadian pitcher have accomplished the feat.

== Background ==
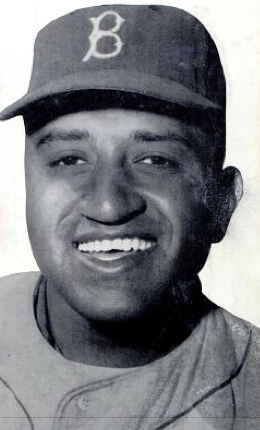
Don Newcombe, the first Black Ace

Following the desegregation of MLB in the late 1940s, and continuing through the establishment of the MLB draft in 1965, it was common for major-league teams to convert African-American pitchers into position players rather than allowing them to continue pitching. Through the 1950s, only two African-American pitchers were 20-game winners—Don Newcombe and Sam Jones. In 1965, they were joined by Bob Gibson and Mudcat Grant; the latter being the first African-American 20-game winner in American League history. One African-Canadian pitcher, Ferguson Jenkins and one African-American Earl Wilson, also accomplished the feat during the 1960s. Since then, there have been several additions to the list of such pitchers—referred to as Black Aces—three in the 1970s, three in the 1980s, one in the 2000s, and two in the 2010s.

In the mid-2000s, surviving members of the group organized to promote their successes and encourage the development of future black players. In 2007, The Black Aces: Baseball's Only African-American Twenty-Game Winners was published, authored by Grant. Some black pitchers from Latin America, notably Cuban-born Luis Tiant (a 20-win pitcher four times in his career), have expressed disappointment that they were not included. Meanwhile, Canadian-born Ferguson Jenkins is included as a Black Ace (Jenkins traces his ancestry on his mother's side to escaped U.S. slaves).

In February 2007, during an event to honor Black History Month, President George W. Bush honored book author Grant and three of his fellow Black Aces (Jenkins, Mike Norris, and Dontrelle Willis) at the White House. During the 2007 MLB season, the Negro Leagues Baseball Museum had a traveling exhibit honoring the Black Aces. The Black Aces were celebrated at Oakland's McAfee Coliseum during that season.

Three members of the Black Aces, Gibson, Jenkins and Sabathia, are members of the National Baseball Hall of Fame.

== List of Black Aces ==
Grant's book, published in 2007, listed 13 pitchers as Black Aces. Subsequently, two African-American pitchers have also won 20 or more games in a single MLB season. Thus, there are currently 15 pitchers considered Black Aces, as listed in the following table.

Key
Pitcher	Name of the person who accomplished the feat
#	Number of seasons the pitcher won 20 or more games
Season and record	Season(s) in which the pitcher won 20 or more games, and their win–loss record in each such season
Team	Team(s) the pitcher played for when he won 20 or more games
†	Pitcher is an inductee to the Baseball Hall of Fame
‡	Pitcher accomplished the feat after the book was published in 2007

Black Aces
Pitcher	#	Season and record	Team
Vida Blue	3	1971 (24–8), 1973 (20–9), 1975 (22–11)	Oakland Athletics
Al Downing	1	1971 (20–9)	Los Angeles Dodgers
Bob Gibson †	5	1965 (20–12), 1966 (21–12), 1968 (22–9), 1969 (20–13), 1970 (23–7)	St. Louis Cardinals
Dwight Gooden	1	1985 (24–4)	New York Mets
Mudcat Grant	1	1965 (21–7)	Minnesota Twins
Ferguson Jenkins †	7	1967 (20–13), 1968 (20–15), 1969 (21–15), 1970 (22–16), 1971 (24–13), 1972 (20–12); 1974 (25–12)	Chicago Cubs; Texas Rangers
Sam Jones	1	1959 (21–15)	San Francisco Giants
Don Newcombe	3	1951 (20–9), 1955 (20–5), 1956 (27–7)	Brooklyn Dodgers
Mike Norris	1	1980 (22–9)	Oakland Athletics
David Price ‡	1	2012 (20–5)	Tampa Bay Rays
J. R. Richard	1	1976 (20–15)	Houston Astros
CC Sabathia † ‡	1	2010 (21–7)	New York Yankees
Dave Stewart	4	1987 (20–13), 1988 (21–12), 1989 (21–9), 1990 (22–11)	Oakland Athletics
Dontrelle Willis	1	2005 (22–10)	Florida Marlins
Earl Wilson	1	1967 (22–11)	Detroit Tigers
