= Dontrelle Willis =

American baseball player (born 1982)

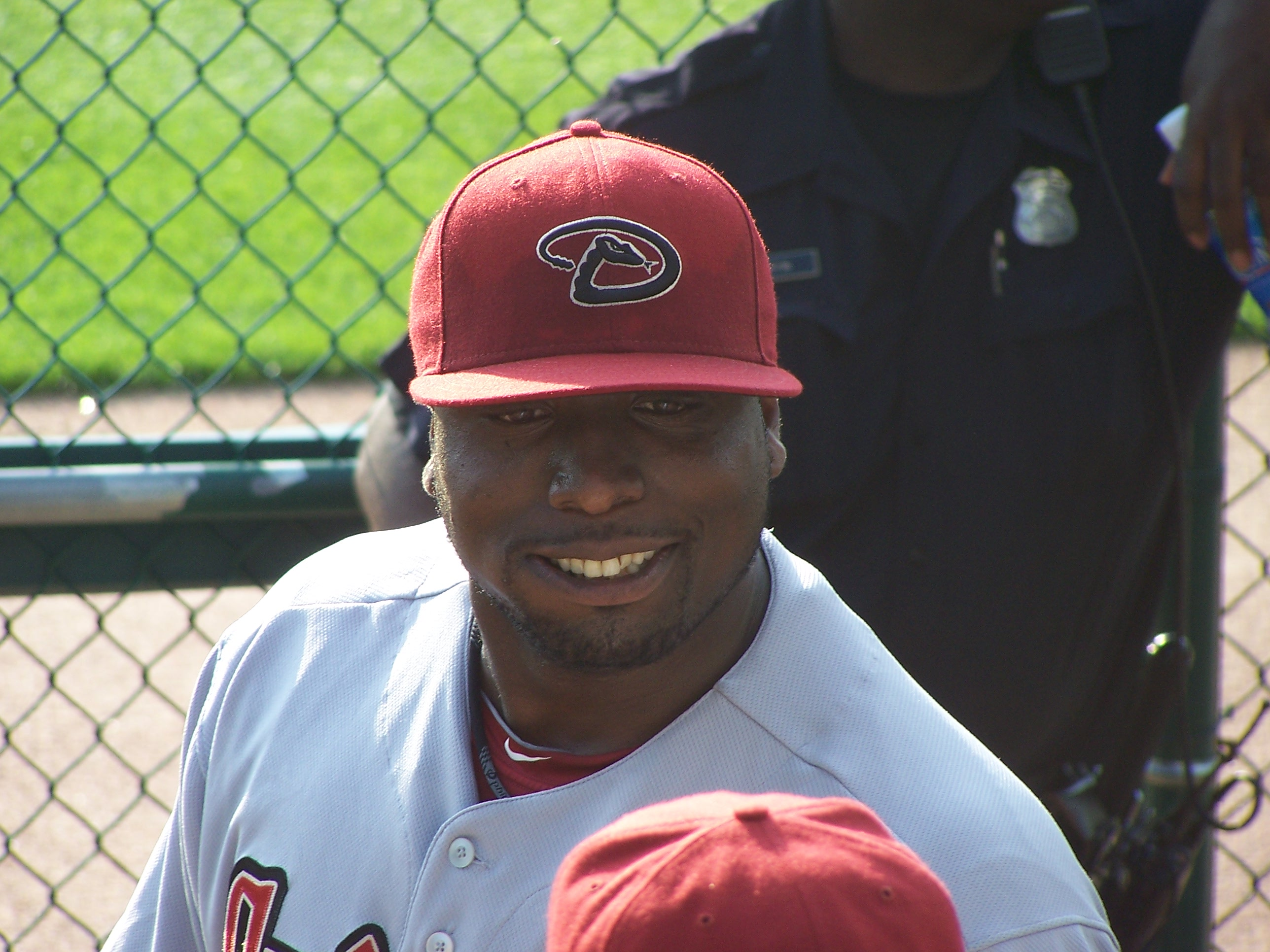
- Willis with the Arizona Diamondbacks in 2010
- Pitcher
- Born: January 12, 1982 (age 44); Oakland, California, U.S.
- Batted: Left Threw: Left

MLB debut
- May 9, 2003, for the Florida Marlins

Last MLB appearance
- September 27, 2011, for the Cincinnati Reds

MLB statistics
- Win–loss record: 72–69
- Earned run average: 4.17
- Strikeouts: 896
- Stats at Baseball Reference

Teams
- Florida Marlins (2003–2007); Detroit Tigers (2008–2010); Arizona Diamondbacks (2010); Cincinnati Reds (2011)

Career highlights and awards
- 2× All-Star (2003, 2005); World Series champion (2003); NL Rookie of the Year (2003); NL wins leader (2005); Marlins Legends Hall of Fame

Dontrelle Wayne Willis (born January 12, 1982), nicknamed "the D-Train", is an American former professional baseball pitcher. A left-hander, he played in Major League Baseball for the Florida Marlins, Detroit Tigers, Arizona Diamondbacks, and Cincinnati Reds. Willis was notable for his success during his first few years in the major leagues and for his unconventional pitching style, which included a high leg kick and exaggerated twisting away from the batter. He was named the 2003 National League Rookie of the Year and won the World Series in the same year.

Willis joined the television broadcast team of the Los Angeles Dodgers in May 2022. He is also a regular studio and game analyst for Fox Sports and AppleTV+.

== Early life ==
Willis was raised by his mother, Joyce, a retired member of Ironworkers Local 378, in Alameda, California. She played in elite-level softball leagues when Willis was a child. Willis never knew his father, Clinton Ostah, who was a minor league player in the 1970s. Growing up, Willis rooted for the Oakland Athletics as a child. Willis' favorite player was former Oakland Athletics' pitcher Dave Stewart.

== Career ==
=== Early career ===
Willis attended Encinal High School in Alameda, where he played baseball for four years. In Willis' senior year in 2000, he had a 0.70 earned run average (ERA) with 111 strikeouts in 70 innings pitched and was named California Player of the Year. He initially committed to play college baseball at Arizona State. He was drafted by the Chicago Cubs in the eighth round of the 2000 Major League Baseball draft.

In 2001, Willis was promoted to the Boise Hawks of the Northwest League. He finished with eight wins and a 2.98 ERA. Opposing hitters only batted .217 against Willis. In a Baseball America poll, several Northwest managers said that Willis was Boise's best player.

=== Florida Marlins ===
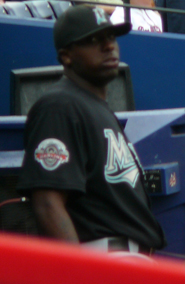
Willis with the Florida Marlins in 2007

On March 27, 2002, the Cubs traded Willis, fellow pitchers Julián Tavárez and José Cueto, and catcher Ryan Jorgensen to the Florida Marlins, in exchange for pitchers Matt Clement and Antonio Alfonseca.

After being traded, Willis struggled early on. However, Willis started to get better as he got to low Class A ball. By the end of the season, he had a 10–2 win–loss record and finished the season with the Class-A Jupiter Hammerheads. In five starts, he went 2–0 with a 1.83 ERA, leading the Midwest League in ERA. For his performance, he was named the Marlins' Minor League Pitcher of the Year.

In the 2003 spring training, Willis reported to Jupiter. The plan was to start him with the Class-AA Carolina Mudcats. The hope was that he would make the leap to AAA, and potentially be available for a spot start in Florida or a back-of-the-bullpen job late in the season. The Marlins then sent Willis down to Carolina to work on consistency and control. Willis went 4–0 with a 1.49 ERA for Carolina.

==== 2003 season ====
On May 9, 2003, Willis made his major league debut for the Florida Marlins against the Colorado Rockies. He pitched six innings, allowed seven hits and three earned runs, and got a no decision. On May 14, in a start against the Padres, Willis went five innings, allowed five hits, three earned runs, and four walks, and received his first Major League win. On June 16, Willis pitched nine innings and allowed no runs in a 1–0 victory over the Mets in his first career shutout. Willis' opponent in that game was Tom Glavine, one of his childhood heroes.

Willis was named the National League Rookie of the Month for June 2003, becoming the first Marlins pitcher to be named Pitcher of the Month. He became the first rookie pitcher to win Pitcher of the Month since Hideo Nomo in 1995 and he became the first rookie pitcher to win seven straight starts since Jason Isringhausen, also in 1995. In five starts, Willis went 5–0 with a 1.04 ERA. Heading into the All-Star Break in mid-July, Willis was 9–1 with a 2.08 ERA in 13 starts. He made the National League All-Star team as injury replacement for Los Angeles Dodgers pitcher Kevin Brown. He became the second Marlins rookie to make the All-Star team; Alex González did it in 1999.

After coming out of the bullpen in game 1 of the 2003 National League Division Series against the Giants, Willis started game 4 of the series. In 5 1/3 innings pitched, Willis allowed five hits, two walks, and struck out three batters, but allowed five earned runs. Despite struggling with his pitching, Willis batted 3-for-3 with a triple and scoring a run during that game, which the Marlins won 7–6 to advance to the NL Championship Series against the Cubs, the team that drafted Willis. In game 4, Willis again struggled with his command. In 2 1/3 innings pitched, he allowed three hits and five walks, and Willis took the loss. His only other appearance in the series was in game 6, when he allowed a run in one inning of relief. Despite his limited contributions, the Marlins went on to defeat the Cubs in seven games. The Marlins then defeated the New York Yankees in the 2003 World Series.

After the 2003 season, Willis was named the National League Rookie of the Year. He went 14–6 with a 3.30 ERA in 27 starts for the year.

==== 2004 season ====
In 2004, Willis started the year 3–0, and did not allow an earned run in his first three starts. In his first two starts, Willis batted 6-for-6 with a home run. His seven consecutive hits in the regular season was one short of the club record held by Gary Sheffield and Preston Wilson. In his next start against the Phillies, Willis struck out in his first at bat, snapping his streak of 10 consecutive hits dating back to previous year's postseason. Willis finished the 2004 season with a record of 10–11 and an ERA of 4.02.

==== 2005 season ====
In 2005, Willis started the 2005 season by pitching two shutouts against the Washington Nationals and the Philadelphia Phillies. During the month of April, Willis went 5–0 in five starts and allowed five earned runs in 35 innings pitched for a 1.29 ERA. He was named NL Pitcher of the Month.

On May 6, Willis became the league's first six-game winner when he went seven innings and allowed no runs against the Rockies. On June 8, Willis became the major league's first 10-game winner when he pitched the Marlins to a 5–4 victory over the Seattle Mariners, allowing four runs. Willis became only the third pitcher in Marlins history to record 10 wins before the All-Star break. On June 23, Willis became the NL's first 12-game winner when he pitched a shutout against the Braves.

Going into the All-Star break, Willis was 13–4 with a 2.39 ERA and a 1.14 walks plus hits per inning pitched. Willis was named to the All-Star team but did not pitch in the game. After the All-Star break, Willis went 9–6 and posted a 2.91 ERA and a 1.13 walks plus hits per innings pitched the rest of the season.

During his last start before the All-Star break, Willis struggled against the Cubs. In 4 1/3 innings, he allowed eight runs, all earned. He struggled in each of his first two starts after the break, failing to make it past the sixth inning in games against the Philadelphia Phillies and San Francisco Giants. Willis matched his highest win total on July 28 against the Pirates when he went seven innings, allowed three hits, no earned runs, and picked up his 14th victory of the season, which tied his career high for most wins in a season. Willis won his career-high 15th victory on August 7 against the Reds. He went eight innings, allowed four hits, and no earned runs. On August 17, Willis held the Padres scoreless by shutting the Padres out in nine innings, earning him his 16th win of the season, second most in baseball. The win put Florida one-and-a-half games behind Houston and Philadelphia in the wild card standings.

Willis won his 19th game of the season against the Mets on September 2, breaking Carl Pavano's franchise record for most wins in a season. Pavano held the Marlins' mark for most victories in a season by a Marlins' pitcher for a year. On September 7 against the Washington Nationals, Willis pitched six innings and allowed one earned run, which gave him his 20th win of the season. He became the first African-American pitcher to win 20 games in a season since Dave Stewart did it in 1990, and in the process, he became the first pitcher to win 20 games and have 20 hits as a batter since Mike Hampton did it in 1999 for the Astros. On September 22, Willis became the first pitcher to bat seventh or higher since Montreal's Steve Renko batted seventh on August 26, 1973. Willis went 1-for-4 against the New York Mets. He posted a 22–10 record with a 2.63 ERA and 1.13 walks plus hits per innings pitched. His 22 wins was the most in baseball. He also pitched seven complete games and five shutouts, also the most in baseball. Willis is still the only pitcher in Marlins history to win 20 games in a season.

Willis finished 2nd in the N.L. Cy Young Award voting behind Chris Carpenter of the St. Louis Cardinals. He won the Warren Spahn Award, given to the best left-handed pitcher in each league.

==== 2006 season ====
In the 2006 season, Willis' numbers were down from his great 2005 season. Willis started the season by going 1–6 with a 4.93 ERA and did not get his second victory of the season until June 2. He still posted decent numbers for the year and went 12–12 with a 3.87 ERA, including 11–6 with a 3.39 ERA from June to September. His 12 wins were tied for the most on the Marlins. Willis also led the Marlins in complete games (4), innings pitched (223 1/3), walks (83), and hit by pitch (19).

On June 20, Willis earned his 50th career win in a start against the Baltimore Orioles.

On July 7, Willis hit a grand slam off of Mets pitcher José Lima, becoming the first pitcher to hit a grand slam since Robert Person did it in 2002. It was his fourth career home run. On September 20, 2006, he hit two home runs, off of Óliver Pérez and Roberto Hernández. He became the first pitcher since Randy Wolf in 2004 to hit two home runs in a game.

==== 2007 season ====
On January 15, 2007, Willis signed a one-year contract with the Marlins for $6.45 million, avoiding salary arbitration.

In the 2007 season, Willis went 10–15 with a 5.17 ERA and a 1.60 walks plus hits per innings pitched. Up to that point, it was his worst season of his career. Willis led the National League in earned runs allowed with 118.

During his career with the Marlins, Willis went 68–54 with a 3.78 ERA. He won at least 10 games each season during all five of his years with the Marlins from 2003 to 2007. In 2026, Willis was announced for induction into the Marlins Legends Hall of Fame, with the ceremony to occur on September 13, 2026.

=== Detroit Tigers ===
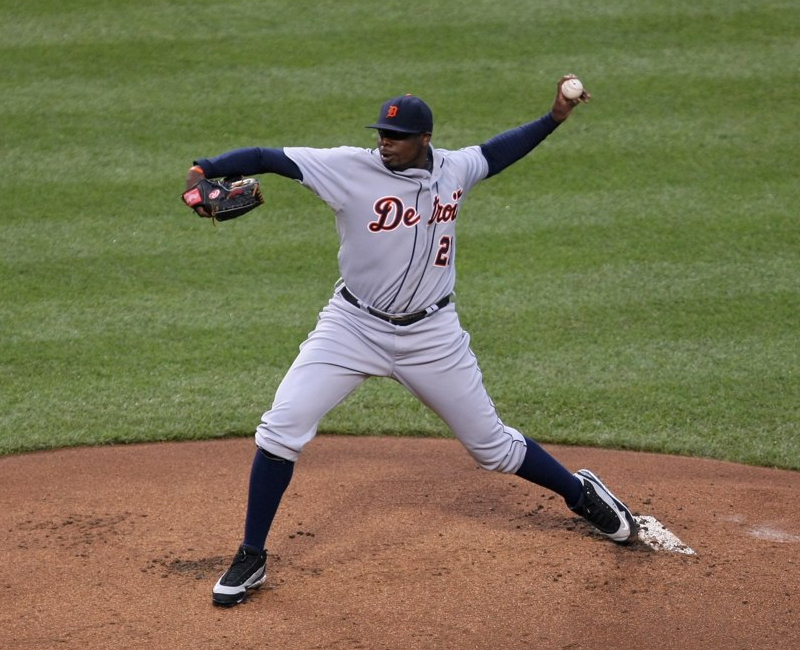
Willis pitching for the Tigers in 2009

On December 5, 2007, the Marlins traded Willis along with fellow All-Star Miguel Cabrera to the Detroit Tigers for Andrew Miller, Cameron Maybin, Mike Rabelo, Eulogio de la Cruz, Dallas Trahern, and Burke Badenhop. Willis signed a three-year, $29 million contract extension two weeks later. In his debut with the Tigers, Willis pitched five innings, gave up one hit, and three earned runs against the Chicago White Sox.

In his next start, also against the White Sox, Willis injured his left knee and departed the game before even recording an out. Placed on the disabled list the next day, Willis had walked nine batters while striking out none in his first two outings. Command of his pitches became a trouble spot, and later in the season, Tiger manager Jim Leyland pitched him in relief for the first time, with little success. He was placed back into the rotation on June 3, 2008, to start in a loss against the Oakland Athletics.

On June 10, 2008, Willis was demoted to the Single-A Lakeland Tigers, a day after a start in which he gave up eight earned runs and five walks in 1 1/3 innings pitched against the Cleveland Indians. Though Willis had enough service time in the major leagues to require his consent prior to the send-down, he agreed, saying he needed to work on his control. Willis was called back to the Tigers in time for the roster expansion on September 1, 2008. He made three starts, recording a loss and two no-decisions. Willis finished with a 0–2 record and a 9.17 ERA. In 24 innings pitched, Willis struggled with his control and walked 35 batters.

Willis was placed on the 15-day disabled list in March 2009 for an anxiety disorder after a blood test showed something of concern; he began a treatment regimen aimed at addressing the condition. Willis was taken off the disabled list and placed on the active roster May 13, 2009, when he made his first start of the 2009 season. Willis made seven starts after returning, with poor results, before being returned to the disabled list on June 19 with the same anxiety issue. In Willis' last start of the season, he allowed six earned runs allowed and eight walks. Willis finished the season with a 1–4 record and a 7.49 ERA.

In Spring training 2010, Willis made the Tigers starting rotation. On April 8, 2010, Willis started against the Kansas City Royals, giving the Tigers six innings and recording a no-decision. He gave up two earned runs, walking two and striking out four.

On May 30, 2010, Willis was designated for assignment by the Tigers. In his career with the Tigers, Willis played in 24 games (22 starts). His record was 2–8 and had a 6.86 ERA in 101 innings pitched.

=== Arizona Diamondbacks ===
On June 1, 2010, Willis was traded to the Arizona Diamondbacks for starting pitcher Billy Buckner. He changed back to his former uniform number 35, which he wore for the Marlins. In his Diamondback debut, he pitched six scoreless innings with four walks and three strikeouts. He got his first win as a member of the Diamondbacks. Willis pitched four innings, giving up two runs and three hits, walking six batters on June 10. During the second inning, he cracked a finger nail and after the fourth inning, he was removed from the game due to the pain on the fingernail.

In six games (five starts) with the Diamondbacks, Willis went 1–1 with a 6.85 ERA in 24 1/3 innings pitched. On July 4, 2010, Willis was designated for assignment and subsequently released.

=== San Francisco Giants ===
On July 15, 2010, Willis was signed to a minor league contract by San Francisco and began pitching for the Fresno Grizzlies of the Pacific Coast League. On November 6, 2010, Willis was granted free agency.

=== Cincinnati Reds ===
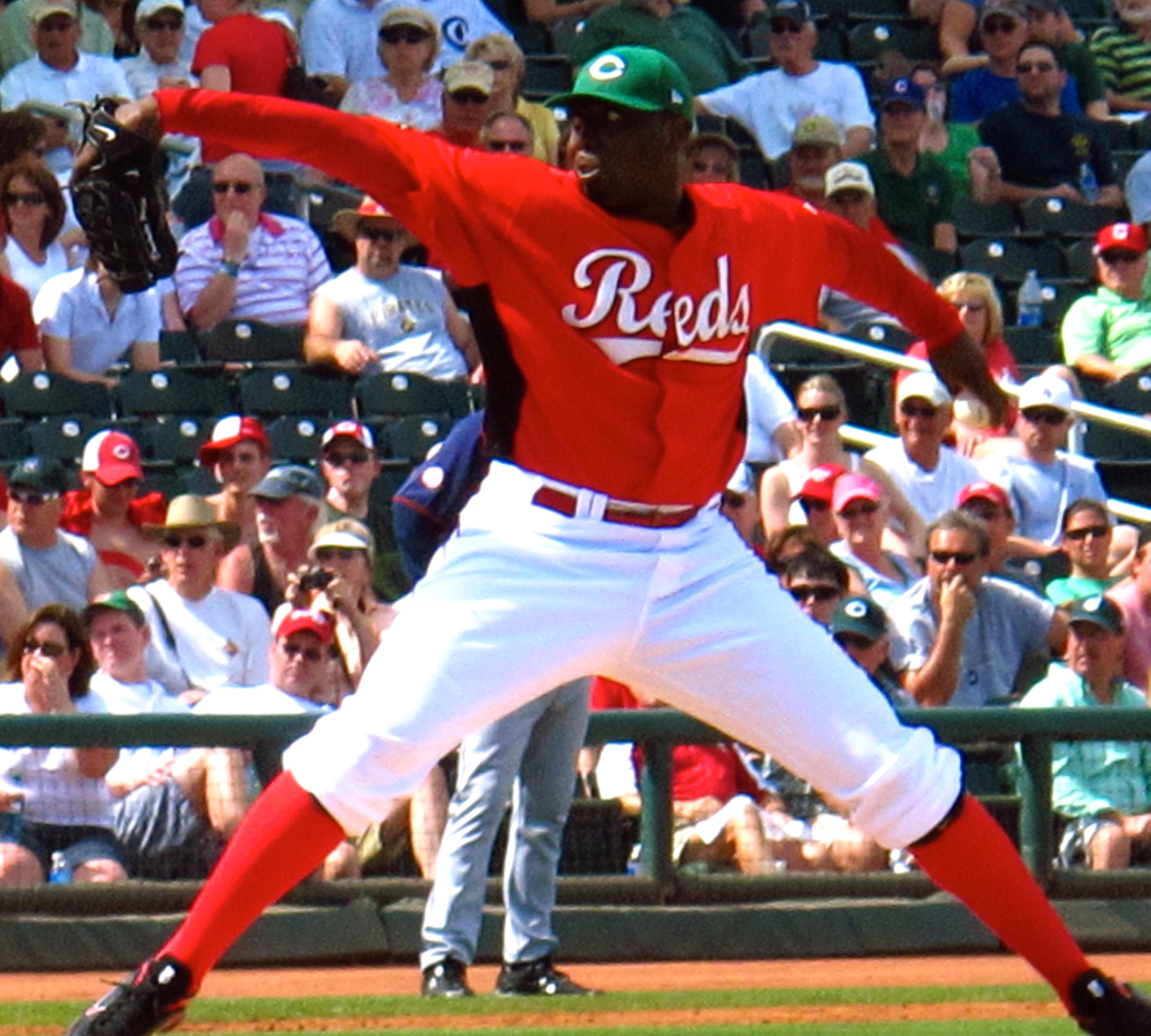
Willis with the Cincinnati Reds in 2011.

Willis signed a minor league contract with the Cincinnati Reds for the 2011 season. He was invited to spring training, for a chance at starter or bullpen. Willis was reassigned to the Louisville Bats as of March 27, 2011. Willis was called up on July 10 and made his Reds debut against Milwaukee at Miller Park. Willis pitched six innings, giving up two runs while striking out four and walking four. He also contributed on offense, going 1-for-2 with a double. Willis made his second start for Cincinnati on July 18, 2011, at PNC Park against the Pittsburgh Pirates. On August 3, Willis started, going six innings and hitting a solo home run but was charged with a no-decision.

On August 9, Willis pitched eight innings, struck out 10 batters, and allowed three earned runs against the Rockies but was charged with the loss. His 10 strikeouts was the most he had got in a start since he struck out 11 against the Diamondbacks on August 14, 2007. His eight innings pitched was the most innings he pitched since his last start with the Florida Marlins, where he pitched eight innings against the Cubs on September 25, 2007. On August 14, Willis pitched 2 2/3 innings and allowed four earned runs against the San Diego Padres. Prior to the start, Willis said that his forearm was still a little tight after he had warmed up in the bullpen earlier.

=== Later career ===
On December 15, 2011, Willis agreed to a one-year deal worth $1 million with the Philadelphia Phillies, and was expected to pitch out of the bullpen. He was released on March 16, 2012, after just three Grapefruit League appearances. Willis signed a minor league contract with the Baltimore Orioles on March 20. A left forearm strain suffered on April 12 led to a dispute with the organization which wanted him to be a relief pitcher. Desiring to be a starter again, he placed the blame for the injury on working out of the bullpen. In his only start after the problem was resolved, he surrendered four runs and six hits in 2 2/3 innings pitched. He made four appearances with the Norfolk Tides, going 0–3 with an 8.53 ERA while allowing eight runs and ten hits in 6 1/3 innings. He announced his retirement as an active player on July 2, 2012.

On January 3, 2013, Willis signed a minor league contract with the Chicago Cubs. He left his first game in spring training after seven pitches, and came out of the game with a shoulder injury. The Cubs released Willis on March 30, 2013.

On April 5, 2013, Willis signed a contract with the Long Island Ducks of the Atlantic League. He compiled the best ERA in the Atlantic League, posting a 2.56 ERA through 14 starts. Willis pitched to a 5–4 record and struck out 52 batters in 87 2/3 innings. By August 3, he was tied for second in the league in complete games with three. His efforts earned him an Atlantic League All-Star selection, and he was chosen as the starting pitcher for the Liberty Division, tossing a perfect inning. On August 8, 2013, the Angels signed Willis to a minor-league contract and assigned him to their AAA affiliate, the Salt Lake Bees.

Willis signed a minor league deal with the San Francisco Giants on January 10, 2014, and was later released on April 16, 2014. On July 5, 2014, the Bridgeport Bluefish of the Atlantic League, reported they had agreed to verbal contract terms with Willis. He made his first start with the Bluefish on July 18, 2014.

On January 21, 2015, Willis signed a minor league contract with the Milwaukee Brewers. However, on March 13, 2015, he announced his retirement.

== Accomplishments ==
- On September 27, 2006, named the Florida Marlins Hometown Hero
- National League Rookie of the Year, 2003
- National League All-Star, 2003 and 2005
- Runner-Up, National League Cy Young Award 2005 (Won by Chris Carpenter)
- On September 3, 2005, beat the New York Mets to earn his 19th win of the season. With that win, Willis passed Carl Pavano's franchise record for wins in a season, established the previous year, when Pavano won 18 games.
- On September 8, 2005, became the first Marlin to win 20 games in a season, with a 12–1 victory over the Washington Nationals; and became one of the Black Aces, African-American major-league pitchers with a 20-win season (the first since Dave Stewart in 1990).
- In 2005, became the third player in modern baseball history to win 20 games and collect 20 hits in the same season.
- On September 22, 2005, batted seventh in the Marlins' lineup. No other pitcher had batted seventh since the Montreal Expos' Steve Renko did against the San Diego Padres on August 26, 1973.
- Warren Spahn Award, 2005 (presented to the best left-handed starting pitcher in the league)
- Named a starter for the U.S. in the inaugural World Baseball Classic. However, both of Willis' starts in the WBC were considered subpar as the U.S. exited the tournament in the 2nd-group stage.
- First pitcher to hit a grand slam since Robert Person in 2002 when he hit one off José Lima of the New York Mets on July 7, 2006.
- Hit two home runs in one game against Mets' pitchers Óliver Pérez and Roberto Hernández on September 20, 2006.

== Personal life ==
Willis married Natalee Vitagliano on December 6, 2006. The couple has four daughters.

In December 2006, Willis was arrested and charged with driving under the influence after he double parked his Bentley in Miami Beach in order to urinate in the street. In April 2008, Willis pleaded guilty to the lesser charge of reckless driving and was ordered to pay $761 in fines and fees, perform 50 hours of community service and serve six months of probation.

In 2006, he was featured in Nike's exclusive Collection Royale, which included two color ways of Nike Dunk shoes with his likeness.

== See also ==
- DHL Hometown Heroes
- List of Major League Baseball annual shutout leaders
- List of Major League Baseball annual wins leaders
- List of Miami Marlins team records
- Miami Marlins award winners and league leaders
