= Santa Fe Catholic High School =

Location
- 3110 US 92 East; Lakeland, (Polk County), Florida 33801; United States; 28°2′56″N 81°53′57″W

Information
- Type: Private, Coeducational
- Motto: Ad Fidem Per Scientiam (To Faith Through Knowledge)
- Religious affiliation: Roman Catholic
- Established: 1961
- NCES School ID: 00258129
- President: Matt Franzino
- Principal: Camille Jowanna
- Faculty: 25.9 (on an FTE basis)
- Grades: 9–12
- Gender: Coed
- Student to teacher ratio: 13.7
- Hours in school day: 7
- Colors: Crimson and Gray
- Slogan: Developing Each Student Fully as a Child of God
- Mascot: Hawk
- Team name: Crimson Hawks
- Accreditation: Southern Association of Colleges and Schools
- Endowment: Santa Fe Catholic Endowment & Charitable Trust
- Website: www.santafecatholic.org

Santa Fe Catholic High School is a private, Roman Catholic high school in Lakeland, Florida, United States. It is located in the Roman Catholic Diocese of Orlando. There are 310 students.

== History ==
Santa Fe Catholic High School, a coeducational institution of the Diocese of Orlando, was founded in 1960 and officially opened on September 5, 1961, as Central Catholic High School. Classes were held for 50 students in grades nine and ten in the administration building at Lodwick Airport, known now as Tigertown. In 1962, St. Augustine Bishop Joseph P. Hurley dedicated the school. Classes were held for the first time in the present administration building. A few months later, the name was changed to Santa Fe Catholic High School. In 1964, Santa Fe had its first graduating class, the organization of a football team and the formation of the National Honor Society.

Faced with increasing enrollment, the administration organized a building fund in 1969 to raise money for additions to Santa Fe. The McDonald Building was dedicated in 1969. In 1970, the school broke ground for the new gymnasium. In 1972, Monsignor Martin Power, Pastor of Saint Joseph's in Lakeland, died, and Reverend Patrick Sheedy, the new Pastor, raised money for the Martin Power Center. The new center was started in January 1973.

== Administration ==
The Southern Association of Colleges and Schools has accredited the school since 1972.

== Academics ==
In 2018–2019, there were 16 Advanced Placement courses, 22 Honors classes.

== Athletics ==
There are 14 sports. (Baseball, Basketball, Cheerleading, Crimsonettes Dance Team, Cross Country, Drumline, Football, Golf, Soccer, Softball, Swimming, Tennis, Track and Field, Volleyball)

== Clubs ==
There are 18 clubs and organizations.

== Student body ==
SAT mean scores were 1,087 (Florida mean score was 990). ACT mean score was 22.6 (Florida mean score was under 20). 98% of graduates were accepted into college. 78% percent receive Florida Bright Futures Scholarships.

In 2010, there were 15 international students from five countries who were being hosted by American families for the school year.

61% of the students were taking honors/AP courses. There are four honor societies.

In 2010, there were 16 students in special-needs programs.

== Notable alumni ==
- Matt Diaz, Atlanta Braves baseball player
- Joe Nemechek, NASCAR driver,
- Michael Happoldt, co-founder of Skunk Records
- Mike Stanton, Former professional baseball player (Houston Astros, Cleveland Indians, Seattle Mariners, Chicago White Sox)
