= John Bohnet =

American baseball player (born 1961)

- Pitcher
- Born: January 18, 1961 (age 65); Pasadena, California, U.S.
- Batted: Both Threw: Left

MLB debut
- May 10, 1982, for the Cleveland Indians

Last MLB appearance
- May 21, 1982, for the Cleveland Indians

MLB statistics
- Win–loss record: 0–0
- Earned run average: 6.94
- Strikeouts: 4
- Stats at Baseball Reference

Teams
- Cleveland Indians (1982)

John Kelly Bohnet (born January 18, 1961) is an American former Major League Baseball pitcher who played for one season. He played for the Cleveland Indians. He was drafted in the first round of the 1979 Major League Baseball draft.
