= Mike Norris (baseball) =

American baseball player (born 1955)

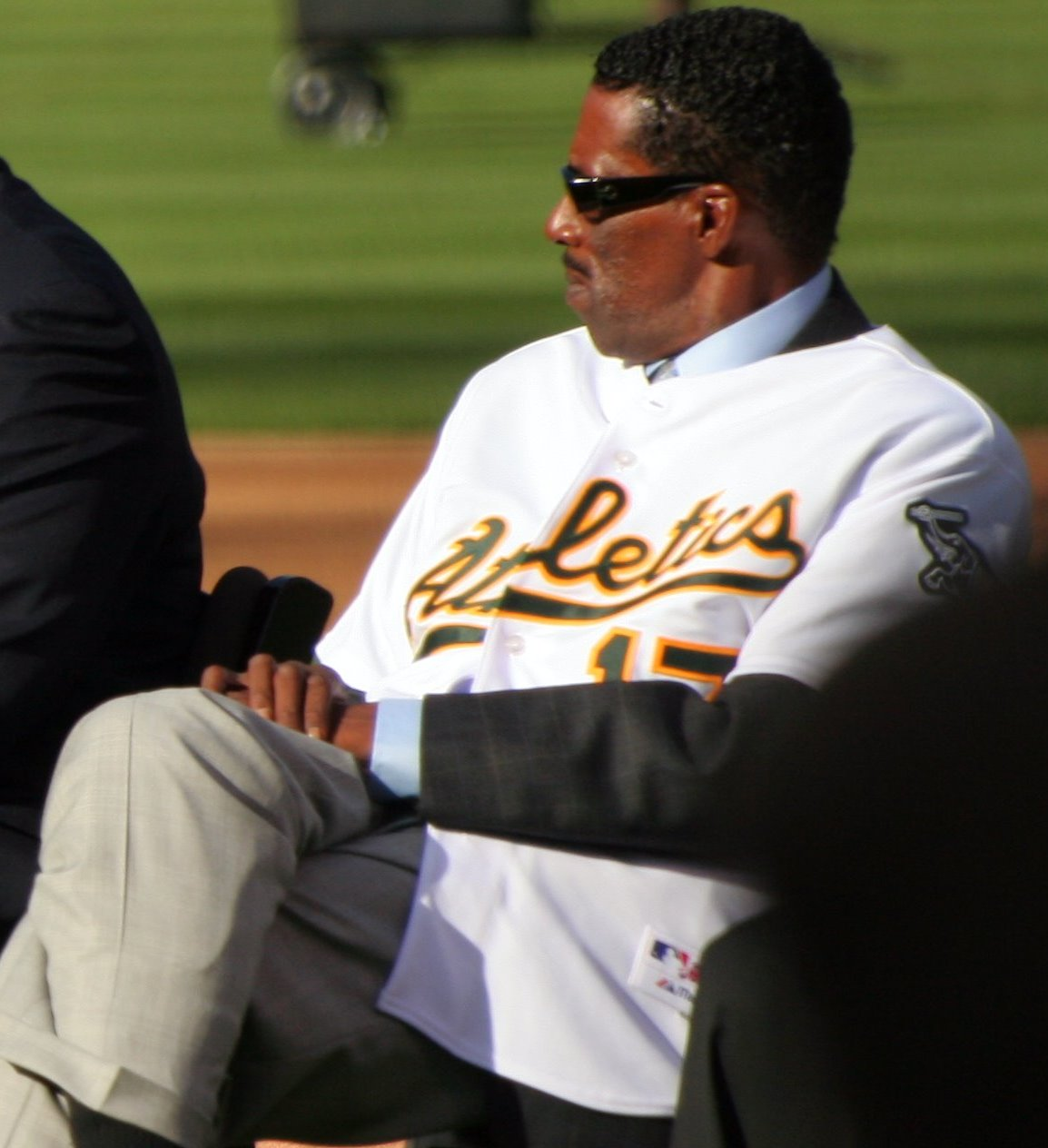
- Norris in 2009
- Pitcher
- Born: March 19, 1955 (age 70); San Francisco, California, U.S.
- Batted: Right Threw: Right

MLB debut
- April 10, 1975, for the Oakland Athletics

Last MLB appearance
- July 4, 1990, for the Oakland Athletics

MLB statistics
- Win–loss record: 58–59
- Earned run average: 3.89
- Strikeouts: 636
- Stats at Baseball Reference

Teams
- Oakland Athletics (1975–1983, 1990)

Career highlights and awards
- All-Star (1981); 2× Gold Glove Award (1980, 1981)

Michael Kelvin Norris (born March 19, 1955) is an American former professional baseball pitcher. He played in Major League Baseball for the Oakland Athletics from 1975 to 1983 and in 1990. Norris is a two-time Gold Glove Award winner and he was an MLB All-Star in 1981.

== Career ==
Norris attended Balboa High School in San Francisco and was drafted by the Oakland Athletics in the first round (24th overall) In January 1973. He made his major league debut in 1975. He struggled mightily during his first five major league seasons, recording a 4.67 ERA and a 12–25 record.

Norris had a breakout season in 1980, going 22–9 with 24 complete games, a 2.53 earned run average and an AL-low .209 batting average against, while also earning his first Gold Glove Award. However, he was not awarded the American League Cy Young Award; Steve Stone of the Baltimore Orioles, who had a record of 25–7, was given the honor. Norris pitched more innings, gave up fewer hits, walks, home runs, and runs, and had a much lower ERA than Stone, but at the time, wins were a primary focus of voters. Norris placed 15th in the MVP voting.

In 1981, Norris posted a modest 12–9 record, earning his second Gold Glove Award and also earning an All-Star berth. Norris spun a complete-game shutout in the first round of the playoffs against the Kansas City Royals and pitched well in the AL Championship Series against the New York Yankees despite getting hit with a loss there.

However, Norris never even approached his 1981 form again. A number of baseball historians and statisticians have blamed this on manager Billy Martin overworking him and the other members of the 1981 staff. In 2006, baseball writer Rob Neyer estimated that Norris threw 131 pitches per complete game in 1981–a heavy workload for a young pitcher even then. He was sent to the minors during the 1983 season. After spending parts of the next five years in the minors, he made a brief comeback as a relief pitcher in 1990, posting an ERA of 3.00 in 27 innings. He is the only player to win at least one game with Oakland in three different decades, as well as the only player with at least a 10-year career to spend his entire career with the Athletics during their tenure in Oakland.

== Later life ==
In 1999 he was diagnosed with cervical myelopathy, and he had surgery in January 2000 at the California Pacific Medical Center. After recovering, Norris took up golf as a hobby. In 2007, he appeared with Dave Stewart, Mudcat Grant, and Vida Blue in a pre-game ceremony before a regular season game between the Texas Rangers and the Oakland Athletics.

Norris was well known for his distinctive green fielding glove.

== See also ==
- Black Aces, African-American pitchers with a 20-win MLB season
- List of Major League Baseball players who spent their entire career with one franchise
