= Jerry Dybzinski =

American baseball player (born 1955)

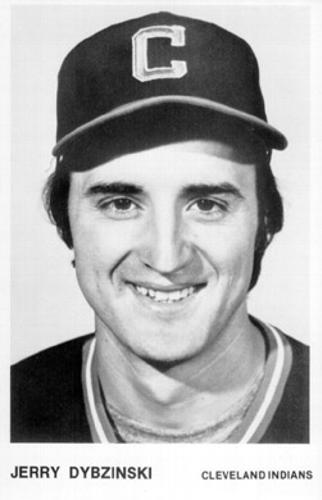
- Shortstop
- Born: July 7, 1955 (age 70); Cleveland, Ohio, U.S.
- Batted: Right Threw: Right

MLB debut
- April 11, 1980, for the Cleveland Indians

Last MLB appearance
- May 1, 1985, for the Pittsburgh Pirates

MLB statistics
- Batting average: .234
- Home runs: 3
- Runs batted in: 93
- Stats at Baseball Reference

Teams
- Cleveland Indians (1980–1982); Chicago White Sox (1983–1984); Pittsburgh Pirates (1985)

Jerome Matthew Dybzinski (born July 7, 1955) is an American former professional baseball shortstop. He played in Major League Baseball (MLB) for the Cleveland Indians, Chicago White Sox, and Pittsburgh Pirates. In 468 career games, Dybzinski recorded a batting average of .234 and accumulated three home runs and 93 runs batted in (RBI).

Born in Cleveland, Dybzinski played college baseball at Cleveland State University and was drafted by the Cleveland Indians in 1977. He spent the next four years in the minor leagues before making the major league roster in 1980. After three seasons with the Indians, he was traded to the Chicago White Sox in 1983, where he was part of the team's playoff run. Dybzinski spent two seasons with the White Sox before being released. He spent the next two seasons with the Pittsburgh Pirates and Seattle Mariners organizations before retiring from professional baseball in 1986.

== Early life ==
Dybzinski was born and raised in Cleveland as one of ten children. He attended Cathedral Latin High School for one year before transferring to Collinwood High School, pitching for the school's baseball team during his final two years of school. He attended Cleveland State University from 1974 to 1977, becoming the first of four Cleveland State alumni to play in the major leagues. In his senior season with the team, he had 33 runs, 25 walks, and six home runs, all of which were school records at the time. He graduated in 1977 with a degree in education and was drafted by the Cleveland Indians in the 15th round of the 1977 Major League Baseball draft.

== Career ==
After signing with the Indians, Dybzinski spent the rest of 1977 with the Batavia Muckdogs of the New York-Penn League. He played in 58 games for the team, finishing the season with a .219 batting average and 18 stolen bases. He played for the Waterloo Indians of the Midwest League in 1978. In 134 games, Dybzinski had a .284 batting average and 25 stolen bases. As a result of his play, he was not only promoted to the Tacoma Tugs of the Pacific Coast League for the 1979 season, but it led to the team trading shortstop Alfredo Griffin to the Toronto Blue Jays, opening up a potential major league spot for Dybzinski. He played in 132 games for Tacoma, finishing the season with a .254 batting average, 25 stolen bases, and a .958 fielding percentage. He then played winter baseball with the Tigres del Licey in the Dominican Professional Baseball League, and helped lead the team to the 1980 Caribbean Series title.

Dybzinski entered spring training in a position battle with Tom Veryzer over who would be the starting shortstop to begin the season. Veryzer won the position battle, but Dybzinski did make the major league roster as a utility infielder. He spent the 1980 Cleveland Indians season mostly at shortstop, serving as Veryzer's backup, but also spent some time at second base after a season-ending injury to Duane Kuiper. Despite struggling on offense, the Indians kept him on the roster throughout the season thanks to his good defensive play. In the 114 games he played during the season, Dybzinski had a .230 batting average, 11 doubles, and 14 sacrifice hits, which was fifth in the American League (AL).

Dybzinski spent the 1981 Cleveland Indians season primarily as the backup shortstop. Unlike the previous season, due partially to a contract extension signed by Veryzer, Dybzinski spent the first half of the season mostly on the bench. When Veryzer was injured, Dybzinski gained more playing time in the second half of the season (the season was split due to the 1981 Major League Baseball strike), but a sprained ankle caused him to miss most of September. He played only 48 games for the Indians that season, finishing the year with a .298 batting average and seven stolen bases. Dybzinski spent the offseason playing winter baseball with the Tigres del Licey.

On January 8, 1982, Veryzer was traded to the New York Mets for Ray Searage. This resulted in Dybzinski winning the starting shortstop job, but he struggled throughout the first half of the season. He had 10 errors through the first month of the season, and in May went hitless in 34 straight at-bats. Mike Fischlin took over for Dybzinski after he was injured in June, and played well enough that the Indians decided to demote Dybzinski to the AAA Charleston Charlies. Dybzinski refused to report to the team, and was suspended without pay until he joined the team. He eventually reported to Charleston and played in 30 games, and after the minor league season ended at the beginning of September, he returned to the Indians roster for the rest of the season. Dybzinski played in 80 games for the Indians in 1982, finishing the season with a .231 batting average. After the Indians traded to acquire Julio Franco, Dybzinski was competing with Franco and Fischlin for both the starting and backup shortstop positions. Franco won the position battle, and on April 1, 1983, Dybzinski was traded to the Chicago White Sox for Pat Tabler.

The 1983 Chicago White Sox season was the most productive season statistically for Dybzinski. He played 127 games as the primary starting shortstop, and had a .230 batting average, 11 stolen bases, and 11 sacrifice hits, which was fifth in the AL. He was part of the White Sox playoff roster, but he made two critical mistakes that thwarted a potential White Sox scoring rally in the seventh inning of the deciding Game 4 of the American League Championship Series. With the game scoreless and Greg Walker and Vance Law at second and first base respectively after each had singled, Dybzinski's unsuccessful sacrifice bunt resulted in Baltimore Orioles catcher Rick Dempsey throwing to third to force out Walker. When the next batter Julio Cruz singled, Dybzinski overran second, realized that Law stopped at third because Todd Cruz had cut off Gary Roenicke's throw from left field and got caught in a rundown. Instead of tagging Dybzinski, second baseman Rich Dauer threw out Law who attempted to score during the rundown. "I felt like a beached whale," Dybzinski said about his baserunning gaffe.

Dybzinski entered the 1984 Chicago White Sox season as the backup to everyday shortstop Scott Fletcher, though manager Tony La Russa had expressed in interest in having Dybzinski spend time at second and third base as well. He spent the full season on the major league roster, but saw less playing time than in previous seasons. He had 132 at-bats in 94 games played, and finished the year with a .235 batting average. The White Sox traded for Ozzie Guillen before the 1985 season, and with their starting and backup shortstops set for the upcoming season, the White Sox released Dybzinski on April 1. He signed with the Pittsburgh Pirates on April 11, and played in five games for them on the major league roster, going hitless in four at-bats before being released from the major league roster a month later. He then spent the rest of the season with the Pirates' minor league affiliate, the Hawaii Islanders. He played in 55 games for the team, finishing the season with a .199 batting average, and was released at the end of the season.

== Later life and career ==
Dybzinski signed as a free agent with the Seattle Mariners in January 1986, but failed to make the major league roster after spring training. He spent 1986 with the AAA Calgary Cannons in the Mariners organization, playing in 115 games for the team and finishing the year with a .252 batting average and 12 doubles. He was not called up to the major league roster in September after the minor league season ended, and retired from professional baseball.

After retiring from professional baseball, Dybzinski moved to Colorado. He is married and has three children.
