= Stan Wall =

American baseball player (born 1951)

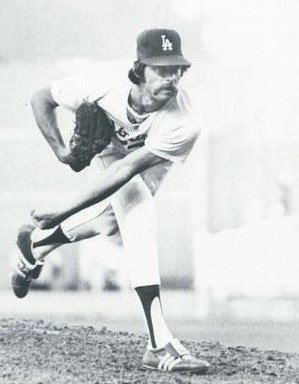
- Pitcher
- Born: June 16, 1951 (age 75); Butler, Missouri, U.S.
- Batted: Left Threw: Left

MLB debut
- July 19, 1975, for the Los Angeles Dodgers

Last MLB appearance
- July 3, 1977, for the Los Angeles Dodgers

MLB statistics
- Win–loss record: 4–6
- Earned run average: 3.86
- Strikeouts: 55
- Stats at Baseball Reference

Teams
- Los Angeles Dodgers (1975–1977)

Stanley Arthur Wall (born June 16, 1951) is an American former pitcher in Major League Baseball. He pitched in 66 games for the Los Angeles Dodgers from 1975 to 1977.
