= Sheldon Burnside =

American baseball player (born 1954)

- Pitcher
- Born: December 22, 1954 (age 71); South Bend, Indiana, U.S.
- Batted: Right Threw: Left

MLB debut
- September 4, 1978, for the Detroit Tigers

Last MLB appearance
- September 16, 1980, for the Cincinnati Reds

MLB statistics
- Win–loss record: 2–1
- Earned run average: 6.00
- Strikeouts: 18
- Stats at Baseball Reference

Teams
- Detroit Tigers (1978–1979); Cincinnati Reds (1980)

Sheldon John Burnside (born December 22, 1954) is an American former Major League Baseball player who pitched for the Detroit Tigers and the Cincinnati Reds.

Burnside was born in South Bend, Indiana but moved to the Greater Toronto Area at about five months old when his father, Bernard, went into business there. At about 12 years old, he began living in Etobicoke, Ontario. Burnside attended Michael Power High School in Etobicoke, which did not have a baseball team, but played for a local semi-professional team. His performance with that team earned him a tryout with the Detroit Tigers who subsequently signed him.

He debuted on September 4, 1978, with the Tigers against the New York Yankees. His debut was rough as he pitched 1/3 of an inning while giving up three hits, two base on balls and four earned runs. On October 25, 1979, he was traded by the Tigers to the Reds for Champ Summers. His last appearance was in 1980 for Cincinnati.
