= Bobby Treviño =

Mexican baseball player (1945-2018)

- Outfielder
- Born: August 15, 1945; Monterrey, Nuevo León, Mexico
- Died: December 5, 2018 (aged 73); Monterrey, Nuevo León, Mexico
- Batted: Right Threw: Right

MLB debut
- May 22, 1968, for the California Angels

Last MLB appearance
- July 6, 1968, for the California Angels

MLB statistics
- Batting average: .225
- Home runs: 0
- Runs batted in: 1
- Stats at Baseball Reference

Teams
- California Angels (1968)

Carlos "Bobby" Treviño Castro ([treh-vee-nyo]; August 15, 1945 – December 5, 2018) was a Mexican professional baseball outfielder. He played in Major League Baseball (MLB) during 1968, for the California Angels, and played 13 seasons in the Mexican League, between 1964 and 1979. During his playing career, he was listed at 6 feet 2 inches (1.88 m) and 185 pounds (84 kg). His younger brother, Alex Treviño, also played in MLB.

== Career ==
Treviño was born in Monterrey, Nuevo León, Mexico. He was on the Mexican team that won the 1958 Little League World Series title. Treviño started his professional baseball career in 1964, at the age of 20. He played in both the Mexican Center League and the Mexican League that season.

In 1966, Treviño (known as "Bobby" in the United States) had his contract purchased by the California Angels. He hit .268 for the El Paso Sun Kings in the Texas League in 1967 and then went to the Pacific Coast League's Seattle Angels. He hit poorly at Seattle and then returned to El Paso. On May 22, 1968, the Angels called Treviño up to their major league roster to replace an injured Jay Johnstone. Treviño played 17 games for the Angels, getting 9 hits in 40 at bats, with 1 run scored, 1 run batted in, and 1 extra base hit (a double). Those games were Treviño's only appearances in MLB.

In 1969, Treviño made history at El Paso. He started off the season hot at the plate and had a base hit in each of his first 37 games. The 37-game hitting streak set a Texas League record that still stands. It was probably Treviño's best year in professional baseball, as he set career-highs in batting average (.314), home runs (6), and RBI (92). However, before the 1970 season, the California Angels organization sent him back to the Mexican League.

Treviño did not play in organized baseball after 1979. He later managed in Mexico for three seasons in the 1970s and 1980s. He died at his home on December 5, 2018.
