= Mike Stanton (right-handed pitcher) =

American baseball player (born 1952)

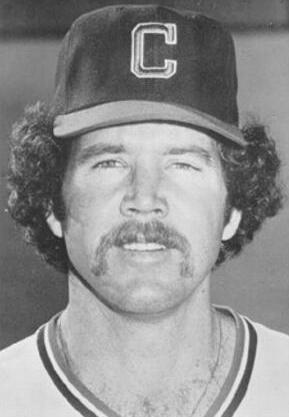

Stanton with the Cleveland Indians c. 1980
- Pitcher
- Born: September 25, 1952 (age 74); St. Louis, Missouri, U.S.
- Batted: Switch Threw: Right

MLB debut
- July 9, 1975, for the Houston Astros

Last MLB appearance
- August 8, 1985, for the Chicago White Sox

MLB statistics
- Win–loss record: 13–22
- Earned run average: 4.61
- Strikeouts: 304
- Stats at Baseball Reference

Teams
- Houston Astros (1975); Cleveland Indians (1980–1981); Seattle Mariners (1982–1985); Chicago White Sox (1985)

Michael Thomas Stanton (born September 25, 1952) is an American former professional baseball pitcher. He pitched in all or parts of seven seasons in Major League Baseball (MLB) between 1975 and 1985.

== Playing career ==
Stanton attended Santa Fe Catholic High School in Lakeland, Florida. He learned to throw a slider from Denny McLain, who coached Stanton on an American Legion team while suspended from MLB. Stanton then attended then Miami Dade College, leading Florida junior college pitchers in strikeouts. He set school records for strikeouts in a game and a season.

Stanton was drafted three times, by the Atlanta Braves, Kansas City Royals, and Texas Rangers before signing with the Houston Astros in 1973. He led the Southern League with 146 strikeouts and 27 starts in 1974. He made his MLB debut with the Astros in 1975, pitching in seven games, including two starts. Due in part to poor control, he then bounced around the minors for the next four years, including a stint in the short-lived Inter-American League in 1979. When that league folded, he followed the advice of his manager, Pat Dobson, to sign with the Cleveland Indians. He returned to the majors with Cleveland in 1980, working primarily as a relief pitcher. He was limited by a sore elbow in 1981. Cleveland released him in February 1982.

Stanton signed with the Seattle Mariners that April, and he had his longest and most productive tenure with the club. He ranked tenth in the American League with 56 games pitched in 1982. He became a more trusted relief option following the trade of Bill Caudill. Stanton had seven saves in his first two seasons with Seattle before leading the team with eight saves in 1984, though shoulder tendonitis ended his final full season with Seattle.

The Mariners released Stanton in 1985, and he finished his MLB career that year with the Chicago White Sox.

== Personal life ==
Stanton is married. During his playing career, he also was a landscape and wildlife artist.
