= Manny Sarmiento =

Venezuelan baseball pitcher (born 1956)

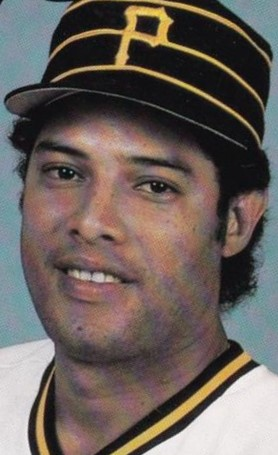
- Pitcher
- Born: February 2, 1956 (age 70); Cagua, Venezuela
- Batted: Right Threw: Right

MLB debut
- July 30, 1976, for the Cincinnati Reds

Last MLB appearance
- October 1, 1983, for the Pittsburgh Pirates

MLB statistics
- Win–loss record: 26–22
- Earned run average: 3.49
- Strikeouts: 283
- Stats at Baseball Reference

Teams
- Cincinnati Reds (1976–1979); Seattle Mariners (1980); Pittsburgh Pirates (1982–1983)

Career highlights and awards
- World Series champion (1976)

Manuel Eduardo Sarmiento Aponte (born February 2, 1956) is a Venezuelan former professional baseball pitcher who played with the Cincinnati Reds (1976–79), Seattle Mariners (1980) and Pittsburgh Pirates (1982–83) in Major League Baseball.

== Career ==
Sarmiento played for four years with Cincinnati's "Big Red Machine". While with the Reds, he posted a 14–8 record with 138 strikeouts, six saves, and a 4.12 earned run average (ERA) in 132 appearances, including five as a starting pitcher. He pitched one inning in the 1976 National League Championship Series, allowing two runs, as the Reds went on to win the World Series.

In 1980, Sarmiento was injured while with Seattle, requiring season-ending surgery. He was traded in April 1981 to the Boston Red Sox, then played the entire season at their Triple-A affiliate, the Pawtucket Red Sox. He was purchased by Pittsburgh after the season. For part of 1982, he switched from the bullpen in an emergency move and had a 9–4 record with 81 strikeouts and 3.39 ERA record before returning to relief duties in the 1983 season. He underwent arm surgery in 1984. He pitched in Triple-A in 1985 and the Mexican Baseball League in 1986.

In a seven-season MLB career, Sarmiento had a 26–22 record with 283 strikeouts and a 3.49 ERA in 513 innings pitched.

Former Pirates teammate Dave Parker testifies during the Pittsburgh drug trials in 1985 that he used cocaine with Sarmiento. In 1987, baseball commissioner Peter Ueberroth later listed Sarmiento among players who would be subject to drug testing, but Sarmiento was no longer playing in the United States.

== Trades and transactions ==
- March 25, 1972 - Signed as a non-drafted free agent by Cincinnati Reds
- August 3, 1976 - Recalled by Cincinnati Reds
- April 2, 1980 - Released by Cincinnati Reds
- April 14, 1980 - Signed by Seattle Mariners
- April 8, 1981 - Traded by Seattle Mariners to Boston Red Sox in exchange for Dick Drago; waived by Boston, assigned to Pawtucket Red Sox (IL)
- October 23, 1981 - Sold by Boston Red Sox to Pittsburgh Pirates
- April 4, 1982 - Outrighted by Pirates to minor league camp
- February 7, 1984 - Signed by Pirates to a two-year contract
- April 7, 1985 - Assigned to Hawaii Islanders (PCL) by Pittsburgh
- 1986 - Signed by the Cordoba Cafeteros (MX) as a free agent.

== Quote ==
"Sarmiento was a fine fielder with a lively split-finger fastball and a singing voice good enough to once sing the National Anthem before a game. As a 20-year-old rookie in 1976, the slender Venezuelan helped the Reds to a World Championship with five relief wins". - Ed Walton, at Baseball Library.

== See also ==
- List of players from Venezuela in Major League Baseball
