= Rodney Scott (baseball) =

American baseball player (born 1953)

- Second baseman / Shortstop
- Born: October 16, 1953 (age 72); Indianapolis, Indiana, U.S.
- Batted: Right Threw: Right

MLB debut
- April 11, 1975, for the Kansas City Royals

Last MLB appearance
- August 21, 1982, for the New York Yankees

MLB statistics
- Batting average: .236
- Home runs: 3
- Runs batted in: 150
- Stats at Baseball Reference

Teams
- Kansas City Royals (1975); Montreal Expos (1976); Oakland Athletics (1977); Chicago Cubs (1978); Montreal Expos (1979–1982); New York Yankees (1982)

Rodney Darrell Scott (born October 16, 1953), nicknamed "Cool Breeze", is an American former infielder in Major League Baseball. Primarily used as a second baseman and shortstop, Scott also played third base, designated hitter and outfield during his eight-year career.

In 1980, Scott led the National League with 13 triples, and was third in the National League with 63 stolen bases. He had 205 career stolen bases.

Scott was involved in five trades during his career.

Scott finished his career with the Expos, although he never played any games for them after they signed him as a free agent for the 1983 season.

== See also ==
- List of Major League Baseball annual triples leaders
- List of Major League Baseball career stolen bases leaders
