= Dennis Lewallyn =

American baseball player & coach (born 1953)

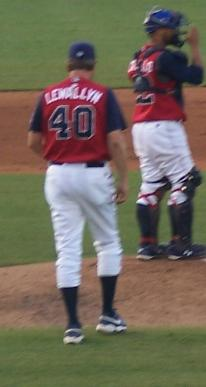
- Pitcher
- Born: August 11, 1953 (age 73); Pensacola, Florida, U.S.
- Batted: Right Threw: Right

MLB debut
- September 21, 1975, for the Los Angeles Dodgers

Last MLB appearance
- April 27, 1982, for the Cleveland Indians

MLB statistics
- Win–loss record: 4–4
- Earned run average: 4.48
- Strikeouts: 28
- Stats at Baseball Reference

Teams
- Los Angeles Dodgers (1975–1979); Texas Rangers (1980); Cleveland Indians (1981–1982)

Dennis Dale Lewallyn (born August 11, 1953) is an American former pitcher in Major League Baseball and was the Pitching coach for the AA Mississippi Braves. He played for the Los Angeles Dodgers, Texas Rangers and Cleveland Indians from 1975-1982. Lewallyn's best season was arguably 1977, where he picked up 3 of his 4 career wins. He posted a respectable 4.24 ERA that season and notched his one and only major league save on September 28, 1977. On that day, Lewallyn pitched 4 innings to hold down a 2-1 Dodgers victory over their arch rival Giants. He saved the game that day for starter Charlie Hough.

Lewallyn was named as the pitching coach for the AA Mississippi Braves in the Braves organization for the 2018 season.
