= Bob Beall =

American baseball player (born 1948)

- First baseman
- Born: April 24, 1948 (age 76); Portland, Oregon, U.S.
- Batted: Both Threw: Left

MLB debut
- May 12, 1975, for the Atlanta Braves

Last MLB appearance
- September 23, 1980, for the Pittsburgh Pirates

MLB statistics
- Batting average: .231
- Home runs: 1
- Runs batted in: 18
- Stats at Baseball Reference

Teams
- Atlanta Braves (1975, 1978–1979); Pittsburgh Pirates (1980)

Robert Brooks Beall (born April 24, 1948) is an American former professional baseball player who played Major League Baseball for the Atlanta Braves (1975, 1978–1979) and the Pittsburgh Pirates in (1980). He played in a total of 148 games in his four-year Major League career, finishing with a .231 batting average.

== Early years ==
Beall graduated from Hillsboro High School in 1966, where he won a state championship his senior year. During his high school career he played for coach Ad Rutschman, and participated in the first game at Hare Field in 1965. After his senior year he was named player of the year in Oregon and was offered scholarships to the University of Oregon and Oregon State University.

He choose Oregon State in Corvallis where he would serve as captain of the baseball team and was selected to the Pacific-8 (now Pac-12 Conference) all-conference team as the first baseman. Additionally, Beall became the first left-handed third baseman in the history of the conference.

His two brothers Jim and Gene also graduated from Hillsboro High, with Jim also playing baseball at OSU before moving to politics.

Beall was drafted in the 28th round of the 1970 amateur draft after graduating with a bachelor's degree in mathematics.

== Professional baseball ==
After leaving Oregon State, the 5-10 first baseman spent several years in the minor leagues. He had signed with the Philadelphia Phillies of the National League and sent to their Walla Walla, Washington, farm team. There he hit for a .389 average for Walla Walla, followed by .314 in the Carolina League. He then spent the next few years moving up through the Phillies farm system. After a year in triple A ball for the Eugene Emeralds, Beall was traded to the Atlanta Braves and played with their triple A team in Richmond, Virginia. Other stops included Reading, Pennsylvania, the Dominican Republic, and Mexico over a 12-year period playing professional baseball.

On May 12, 1975, Beall made his major league debut playing first base for the Atlanta Braves. During the 1975 season he played eight games and hit for a .226 batting average with one run batted in. After spending the next few years in the minor leagues, he returned to Atlanta for the 1978 season. That season he hit one home run, drove in 16 runs, while batting .243 over 108 games. The next season was his last for the Braves, and he played in 17 games and hit .133. 1980 was his last year in the Major Leagues, where he played in three games without a single hit for the Pittsburgh Pirates. In his 148-game career he hit .231 in 234 at-bats with one home run, 18 RBIs, and a .987 fielding average. After leaving the Pirates, he spent some time with the Portland Beavers minor league team in Portland, Oregon. With the Beavers he was a player-coach at a time when the team was the triple A affiliate for the Pirates. He then retired in 1981 and returned to Hillsboro and began working for sportswear company Nike.
