= Miguel Diloné =

Dominican baseball player (born 1954)

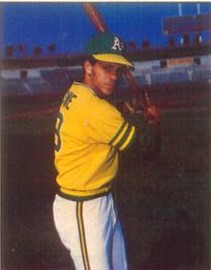
- Outfielder
- Born: November 1, 1954 (age 71); Santiago, Dominican Republic
- Batted: Both Threw: Right

MLB debut
- September 2, 1974, for the Pittsburgh Pirates

Last MLB appearance
- October 6, 1985, for the San Diego Padres

MLB statistics
- Batting average: .265
- Home runs: 6
- Runs batted in: 129
- Stolen bases: 267
- Stats at Baseball Reference

Teams
- Pittsburgh Pirates (1974–1977); Oakland Athletics (1978–1979); Chicago Cubs (1979); Cleveland Indians (1980–1983); Chicago White Sox (1983); Pittsburgh Pirates (1983); Montreal Expos (1984–1985); San Diego Padres (1985)

Miguel Ángel Diloné Reyes (/diːloʊˈneɪ/ dee-loh-NAY; born November 1, 1954) is a Dominican former Major League Baseball switch hitting outfielder. He played 12 seasons with the Pittsburgh Pirates, Oakland Athletics, Chicago Cubs, Cleveland Indians, Chicago White Sox, Montreal Expos and San Diego Padres.

Diloné represented the Dominican Republic at the 1971 Pan American Games.

Diloné began his career as a September call-up in 1974 at the age of 19. Used primarily as a pinch runner with the Pirates, he had 21 stolen bases in four seasons with the Pirates. In 1978 he was traded to the A's along with Elias Sosa and Mike Edwards for Manny Sanguillen. He stole 56 bases during his 2 years in Oakland. After splitting his 1979 season between the Oakland Athletics and Chicago Cubs, Miguel landed in with the Cleveland Indians in 1980 where he had the best years of his career. 1980 was his career season. Batting .341, he had 180 hits, 30 doubles, 9 triples and 61 stolen bases. During his 4 years with the Indians, he stole 128 bases, hitting .289. Toward the end of the 1983 season, the Indians traded him to the Chicago White Sox for Rich Barnes, who 7 days later traded him back to the Pittsburgh Pirates for Randy Niemann. After finishing the 1983 season with the Pirates, Miguel signed with the Montreal Expos as a free agent. Miguel played the 1984 season and part of 1985 with the Expos before being released and signing with the San Diego Padres to finish up the 1985 season and his major league career.

Diloné finished his career with 267 stolen bases, getting caught stealing 78 times, with a batting average of .265 and an OPS of .648. In exactly 2,000 career at bats, Miguel had 530 hits, 67 doubles, 25 triples, 6 HRs and 129 RBIs. He finished in the top 10 in stolen bases 4 times during his career.

In 2009, Diloné lost an eye when a baseball struck him in the face. At the time he was coaching his son and a 15-year-old prospect.

== See also ==
- List of Major League Baseball career stolen bases leaders
