= Monument Park (Yankee Stadium) =

Open-air museum in Yankee Stadium

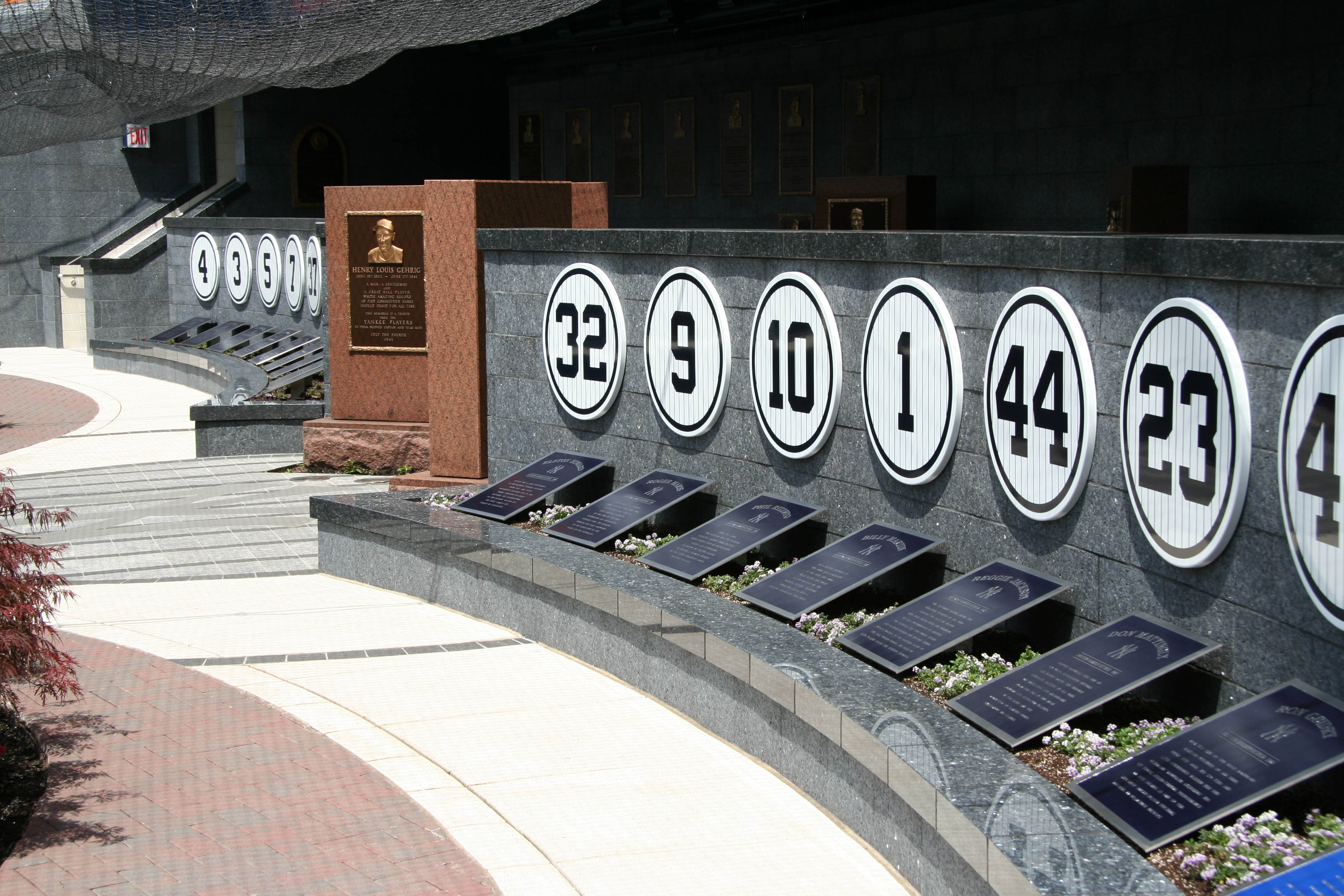
- Monument Park at Yankee Stadium
- Location: 1 East 161st Street; Yankee Stadium; The Bronx, New York
- Coordinates: 40°49′47.22″N 73°55′31.7″W
- Founder: New York Yankees

Monument Park is an open-air museum located in Yankee Stadium in the Bronx, New York City. It contains a collection of monuments, plaques, and retired numbers honoring distinguished members of the New York Yankees of Major League Baseball.

The history of the original Monument Park can be traced to the original Yankee Stadium in 1932, when the team posthumously dedicated an on-field monument to manager Miller Huggins in center field. Additional team members were honored with monuments and plaques in the area over the years. During the stadium's renovation in the mid-1970s, the center field fence was moved in 44 feet (13 m), enclosing prior monuments, plaques, and the flag pole outside the field of play. Over time, additional plaques were added; in 1985, the park was opened for public access. When the Yankees moved to their new ballpark in 2009, Monument Park was built beyond the center-field fences and the contents of the old one transported over.

Thirty-seven members of the Yankee organization have been honored in Monument Park, while 22 have had their uniform numbers retired. An additional honor, a monument mounted on a large red granite block, has only been awarded to six Yankees: manager Miller Huggins, players Lou Gehrig, Babe Ruth, Mickey Mantle, and Joe DiMaggio, and owner George Steinbrenner.

== History ==
=== Precursor ===
The original Yankee Stadium was built in 1923. As with many other jewel box ballparks of the era, the flag pole was placed in play. With a 500-foot (150 m) distance to straightaway center field, the flag pole rarely interfered in play. Yankees manager Miller Huggins died suddenly in 1929, and the team erected a free-standing monument in front of the flag pole in his honor on May 30, 1932, between games of a Memorial Day doubleheader. The monument consisted of a bronze plaque mounted on an upright block of red granite resembling a headstone. This, in turn, led many Yankee fans over the years, particularly children, to believe that the players honored were also buried there upon their death.

Yankee Stadium in the 1950s, with the monuments and flag pole in center field, still within the field of play

In 1936, the center field fence was moved in from 490 feet (150 m) to 461 feet (141 m) from home plate, but the flagpole and the Huggins monument remained in play. The Yankees dedicated a plaque on the center field fence for Jacob Ruppert in 1940 and similar monuments for Lou Gehrig in 1941 and Babe Ruth in 1949, following their deaths. A plaque was dedicated to Ed Barrow in 1954. In 1969, Mickey Mantle and Joe DiMaggio were honored with plaques in the same ceremony; Mantle suggested that DiMaggio's plaque should be hung a little bit higher than his. During Old-Timers' Day on July 22, 1972, the Yankees retired No. 8 for Yogi Berra and Bill Dickey.

Despite the distance, a batted ball still sometimes made it to the monuments. In the 1992 book The Gospel According to Casey, by Ira Berkow and Jim Kaplan, it is reported that on one occasion a Yankees outfielder had let the ball get by him and was fumbling for it among the monuments. Manager Casey Stengel hollered to the field, "Ruth, Gehrig, Huggins, somebody get that ball back to the infield!"

=== Monument Park I ===
When Yankee Stadium was remodeled from 1974 to 1975, the center field fence was moved in to 417 feet (127 m). The flag pole and monuments were relocated from center field to an enclosed area, formerly occupied by bleachers, beyond left-center. As this fenced-in area between the two bullpens gathered additional plaques on its wall, it began to be referred to as "Monument Park". It was inaccessible to fans. With the formalization of the area as an official Monument Park as the stadium reopened in 1976, new plaques were announced for managers Joe McCarthy and Casey Stengel, as well as a plaque memorializing Pope Paul VI's 1965 visit to Yankee Stadium.

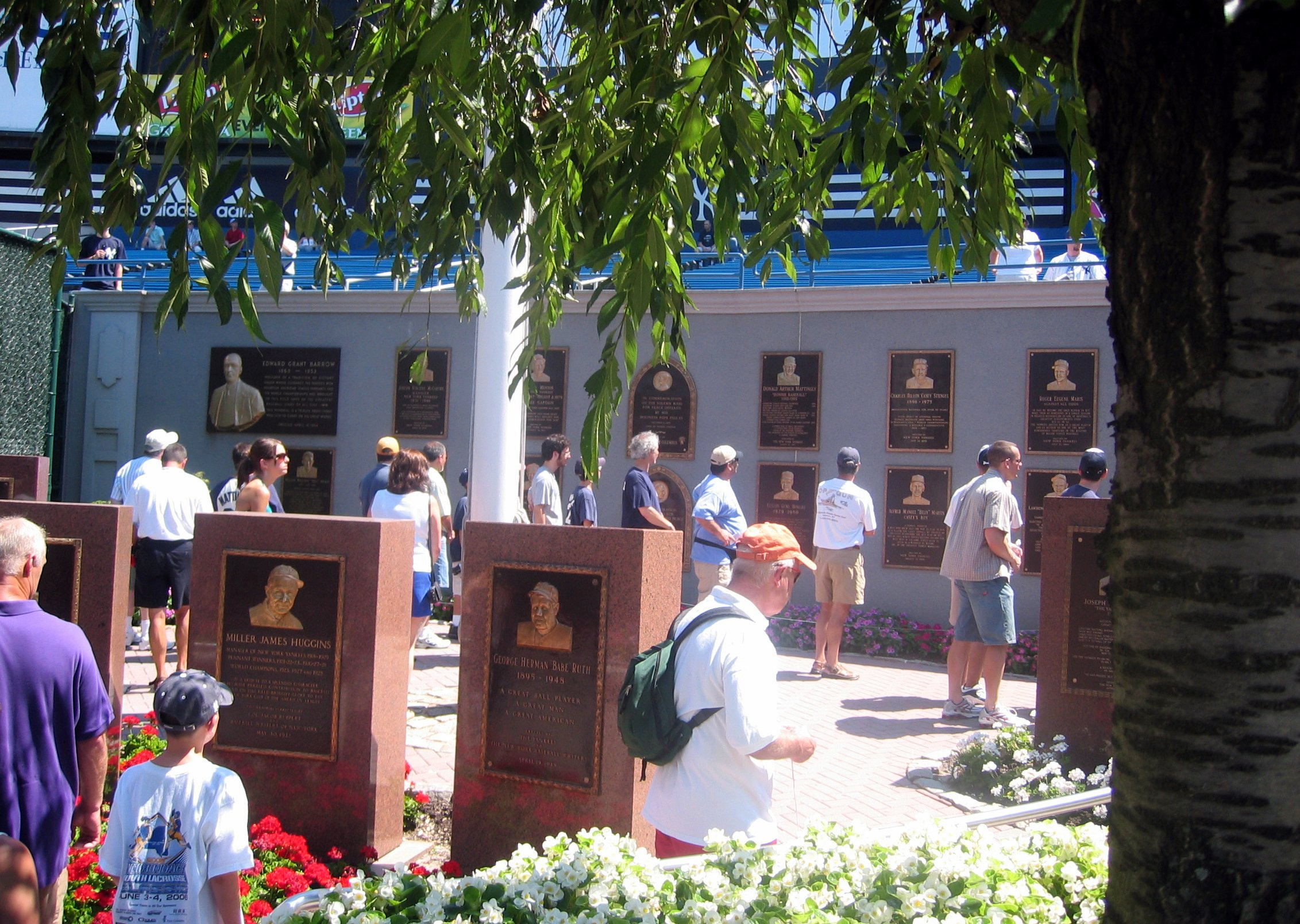
The original Monument Park consisted of a row of monuments with plaques lining the wall behind them

Yankees catcher Thurman Munson died in a plane crash on August 2, 1979; the Yankees retired his No. 15 on August 4 and dedicated a plaque to him in a pregame ceremony on September 20, 1980. On July 21, 1984, which was Old-Timers' Day, the Yankees retired No. 9 for Roger Maris and No. 32 for Elston Howard while also dedicating plaques to both.

The Yankees moved the center field fence in to 410 feet (120 m), so that the Yankees could make Monument Park accessible to fans prior to most games at Yankee Stadium. Monument Park was also part of the public tour of the venue. The Yankees retired No. 10 for Phil Rizzuto in August 1985 and No. 1 for Billy Martin in August 1986, while dedicating plaques for both. The Yankees dedicated plaques to Ford and Lefty Gomez on August 1, 1987. The Mantle and DiMaggio plaques were removed from the wall upon their deaths in 1995 and 1999, respectively, and mounted on red granite blocks matching the original three of Huggins, Gehrig, and Ruth.

In honor of Jackie Robinson, his No. 42 was retired throughout baseball on April 15, 1997, the 50th anniversary of his major league debut. The Yankees erected a plaque for Robinson. Players active at the time of the number's retirement in 1997 were granted a special exemption permitting them to continue wearing the number for the remainder of their careers; the last such active player to wear No. 42 was Yankee relief pitcher Mariano Rivera.

When Roger Clemens pitched for the Yankees from 1999 to 2003, he made a routine of going from the bullpen to Monument Park before each game that he started and rubbing the head of Ruth on his plaque for luck before going to the pitcher's mound.

When Red Ruffing's plaque was dedicated in 2004, his son called it "the second-greatest honor you can have in baseball, in my opinion" trailing only induction into the National Baseball Hall of Fame.

In addition to baseball related recognitions, the Knights of Columbus donated plaques in honor of the Masses celebrated at Yankee Stadium by Pope Paul VI on October 4, 1965, Pope John Paul II on October 2, 1979, and Pope Benedict XVI on April 20, 2008. The Yankees also dedicated a monument to the victims and rescue workers of the September 11 attacks on September 11, 2002, the first anniversary of the attacks.

=== Monument Park II ===
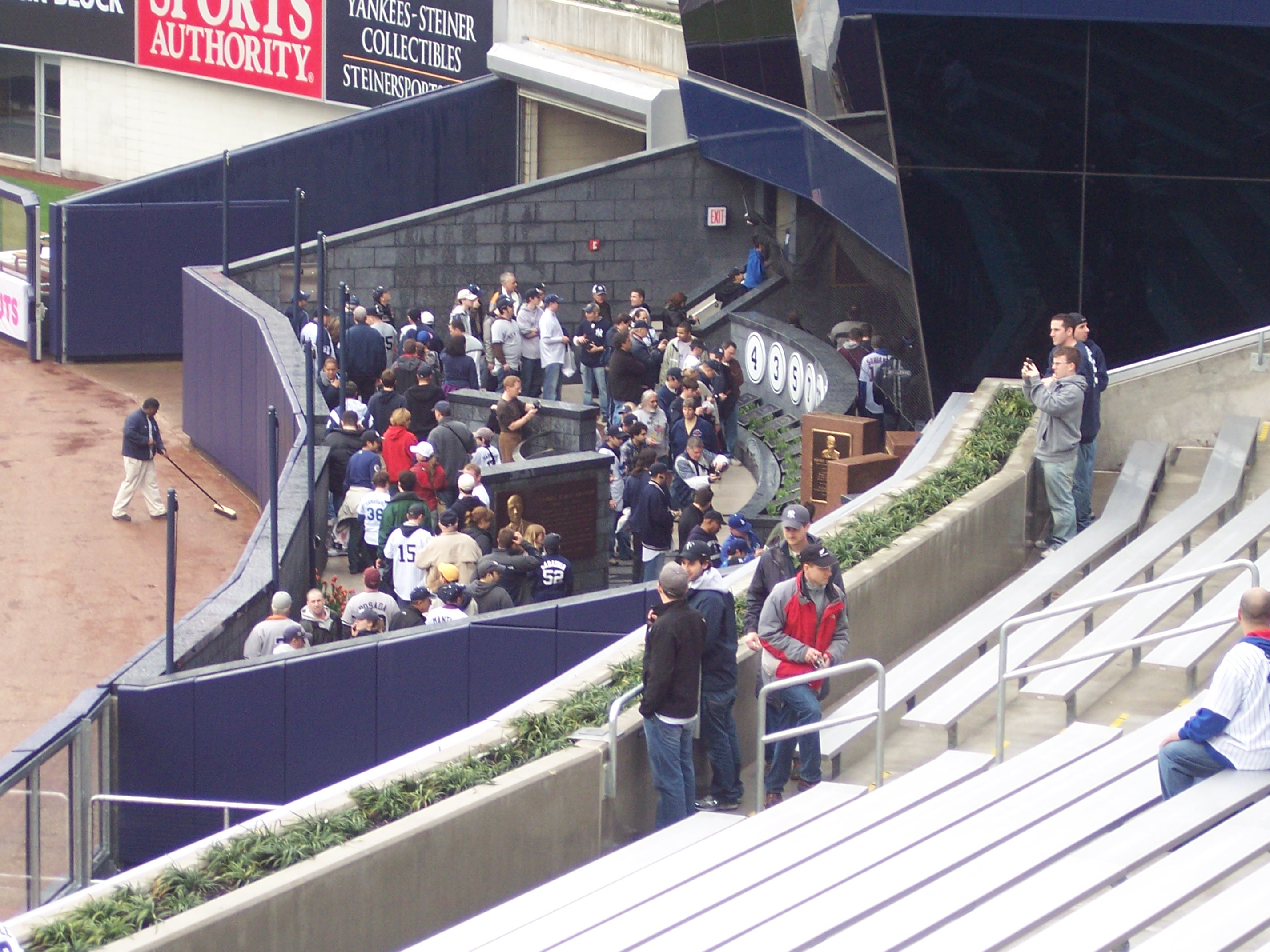
The second Monument Park

When the Yankees moved into the new Yankee Stadium after the 2008 season, the Yankees established a new Monument Park behind the fence in straightaway center field, below the Center Field Sports Bar that serves as the batter's eye. Built of pearl blue granite from Finland, this new monument park features the five Yankee monuments in a central area around a black marble Yankees logo. This is flanked by two short stone walls which hold the retired numbers. The plaques are mounted on the back wall and the September 11 monument is on one end of the park.

In contrast to the old stadium, the new Monument Park is not readily visible from the field, and its relatively drab appearance and inconspicuous placement have led some to derisively nickname it "Monument Cave". Spectators can visit Monument Park prior to the beginning of each game. It closes 45 minutes before first pitch.

The Yankees honored Rivera by retiring his uniform number on September 22, 2013, during his final season, making him the first active player to be enshrined in Monument Park. Mantle wore his No. 7 when he coached the Yankees in 1970, even though it was retired the previous year, while Berra wore his No. 8 while he coached the Yankees from 1976 through 1985, though it was retired in 1972. Similarly, when Martin returned to manage the Yankees in 1988, he wore his No. 1, which had been retired in his honor in 1986.

In 2014, the Yankees dedicated plaques in Monument Park for Joe Torre, Paul O'Neill, Tino Martinez, and Goose Gossage, and retired No. 6 in honor of Torre. In 2015, the team dedicated plaques for Jorge Posada, Andy Pettitte, Bernie Williams, Mel Stottlemyre, and Willie Randolph, and retired the numbers of Pettitte (No. 46), Posada (No. 20), and Williams (No. 51). The Yankees dedicated a plaque to Rivera on August 14, 2016, and retired Derek Jeter's No. 2 and dedicated a plaque for him on May 14, 2017. They retired No. 21 for O'Neill on August 21, 2022 and No 52 for CC Sabathia on September 25, 2026.

The Yankees dedicated a plaque to Nelson Mandela on April 16, 2014, to commemorate his life and 1990 visit to Yankee Stadium. (Note: The ceremony was scheduled for April 15, which is Jackie Robinson Day, but it was delayed by rain.) On June 25, 2019, the Yankees dedicated a plaque commemorating the 50th anniversary of the Stonewall Inn Uprising, which sparked the modern day movement for LGBT rights in the United States.

== Baseball honorees ==
The following players and other Yankees personnel are honored with monuments or plaques in Monument Park. Monuments are considered a greater honor than plaques, and have only been awarded posthumously.

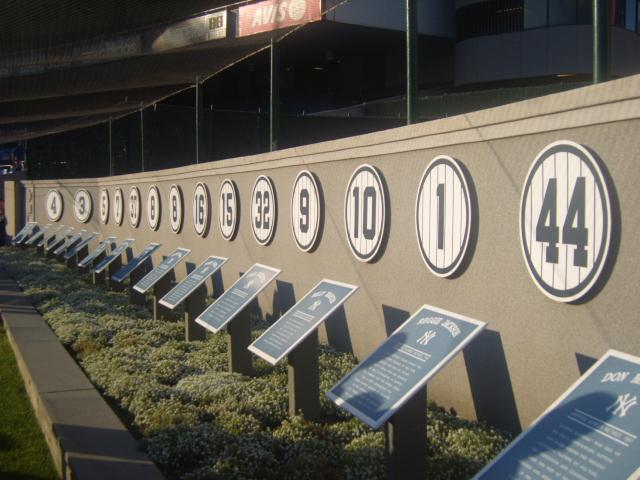
Retired numbers lined the rear wall of the original Monument Park

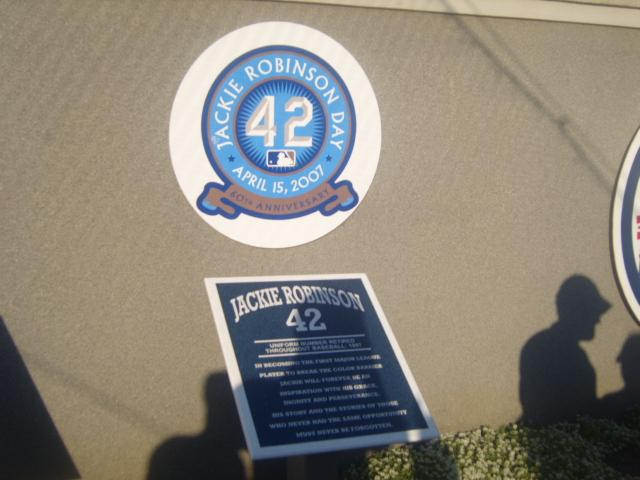
Retired number for Jackie Robinson in the original Monument Park

Key
| Honoree | Name of the honoree |
| Position(s) | Fielding position(s) or role in the organization |
| Number retired (x) | Date number retired (and number), if applicable |
| Plaque | Date plaque dedicated, if applicable |
| Monument | Date monument dedicated, if applicable |
| † | Elected to the Baseball Hall of Fame |
| ‡ | Recipient of the Hall of Fame's Ford C. Frick Award |

Honorees
| Honoree | Position(s) | Number retired | Plaque | Monument | Career w/ Yankees | Ref |
|---|---|---|---|---|---|---|
| Miller Huggins^{†} | Manager | — | May 30, 1932 | May 30, 1932 | 1918–1929 | |
| Lou Gehrig^{†} | First baseman | July 4, 1939 (No. 4) | July 6, 1941 | July 6, 1941 | 1923–1939 | |
| Jacob Ruppert^{†} | Owner | — | April 19, 1940 | — | 1915–1939 | |
| Babe Ruth^{†} | Outfielder | June 13, 1948 (No. 3) | April 19, 1949 | April 19, 1949 | 1920–1934 | |
| Ed Barrow^{†} | General manager | — | April 15, 1954 | — | 1921–1945 | |
| Joe DiMaggio^{†} | Outfielder | April 18, 1952 (No. 5) | June 8, 1969 | April 25, 1999 | 1936–1942, 1946–1951 | |
| Mickey Mantle^{†} | Outfielder | June 8, 1969 (No. 7) | June 8, 1969 | August 25, 1996 | 1951–1968 | |
| Joe McCarthy^{†} | Manager | — (Note: Although the Yankees adopted uniform numbers in 1929, McCarthy never wore a number with the Yankees.) | April 29, 1976 | — | 1931–1946 | |
| Casey Stengel^{†} | Manager | August 8, 1970 (No. 37) | July 30, 1976 | — | 1949–1960 | |
| Thurman Munson | Catcher | August 2, 1979 (No. 15) | September 20, 1980 | — | 1969–1979 | |
| Elston Howard | Catcher / Outfielder | July 21, 1984 (No. 32) | July 21, 1984 | — | 1955–1967 | |
| Roger Maris | Outfielder | July 21, 1984 (No. 9) | July 21, 1984 | — | 1960–1966 | |
| Phil Rizzuto^{†} | Shortstop / Broadcaster | August 4, 1985 (No. 10) | August 4, 1985 | — | 1941–1942, 1946–1956 (as player); 1957–1996 (as broadcaster) | |
| Billy Martin | Second baseman / Manager | August 10, 1986 (No. 1) | August 10, 1986 | — | 1950–1957 (as player); 1975–1979, 1983, 1985, 1988 (as manager) | |
| Lefty Gomez^{†} | Pitcher | — | August 1, 1987 | — | 1930–1942 | |
| Whitey Ford^{†} | Pitcher | August 3, 1974 (No. 16) | August 1, 1987 | — | 1950, 1953–1967 | |
| Bill Dickey^{†} | Catcher | July 22, 1972 (No. 8) | August 21, 1988 | — | 1928–1943, 1946 | |
| Yogi Berra^{†} | Catcher / Outfielder | July 22, 1972 (No. 8) | August 21, 1988 | — | 1946–1963 | |
| Allie Reynolds | Pitcher | — | August 27, 1989 | — | 1947–1954 | |
| Don Mattingly | First baseman | August 31, 1997 (No. 23) | August 31, 1997 | — | 1982–1995 | |
| Mel Allen^{‡} | Broadcaster | — | July 25, 1998 | — | 1939–1964, 1976–1990 | |
| Bob Sheppard | Public address announcer | — | May 7, 2000 | — | 1951–2007 | |
| Reggie Jackson^{†} | Outfielder | August 14, 1993 (No. 44) | July 6, 2002 | — | 1977–1981 | |
| Ron Guidry | Pitcher | August 23, 2003 (No. 49) | August 23, 2003 | — | 1975–1988 | |
| Red Ruffing^{†} | Pitcher | — | July 10, 2004 | — | 1930–1942, 1945–1946 | |
| Jackie Robinson^{†} | Second baseman | April 15, 1997 (No. 42) | April 17, 2007 (Note: The Yankees unveiled a new plaque for Robinson as part of the ceremony retiring No. 42 for Rivera on September 22, 2013.) | — | 1947–1956 (Brooklyn Dodgers) | |
| George Steinbrenner | Owner | — | September 20, 2010 | September 20, 2010 | 1973–2010 | |
| Mariano Rivera^{†} | Pitcher | September 22, 2013 (No. 42) | August 14, 2016 | — | 1995–2013 | |
| Tino Martinez | First baseman | — | June 21, 2014 | — | 1996–2001, 2005 | |
| Goose Gossage^{†} | Pitcher | — | June 22, 2014 | — | 1978–1983, 1989 | |
| Paul O'Neill | Outfielder | August 21, 2022 (No. 21) | August 9, 2014 | — | 1993–2001 | |
| Joe Torre^{†} | Manager | August 23, 2014 (No. 6) | August 23, 2014 | — | 1996–2007 | |
| Bernie Williams | Outfielder | May 24, 2015 (No. 51) | May 24, 2015 | — | 1991–2006 | |
| Willie Randolph | Second baseman / Coach | — | June 20, 2015 | — | 1976–1988 | |
| Mel Stottlemyre | Pitcher / Coach | — | June 20, 2015 | — | 1964–1974 | |
| Jorge Posada | Catcher | August 22, 2015 (No. 20) | August 22, 2015 | — | 1995–2011 | |
| Andy Pettitte | Pitcher | August 23, 2015 (No. 46) | August 23, 2015 | — | 1995–2003, 2007–2010, 2012–2013 | |
| Derek Jeter^{†} | Shortstop | May 14, 2017 (No. 2) | May 14, 2017 | — | 1995–2014 | |
| CC Sabathia^{†} | Pitcher | September 25, 2026 (No. 52) | September 25, 2026 | — | 2009–2019 | |

== Image gallery ==
Monument Park I

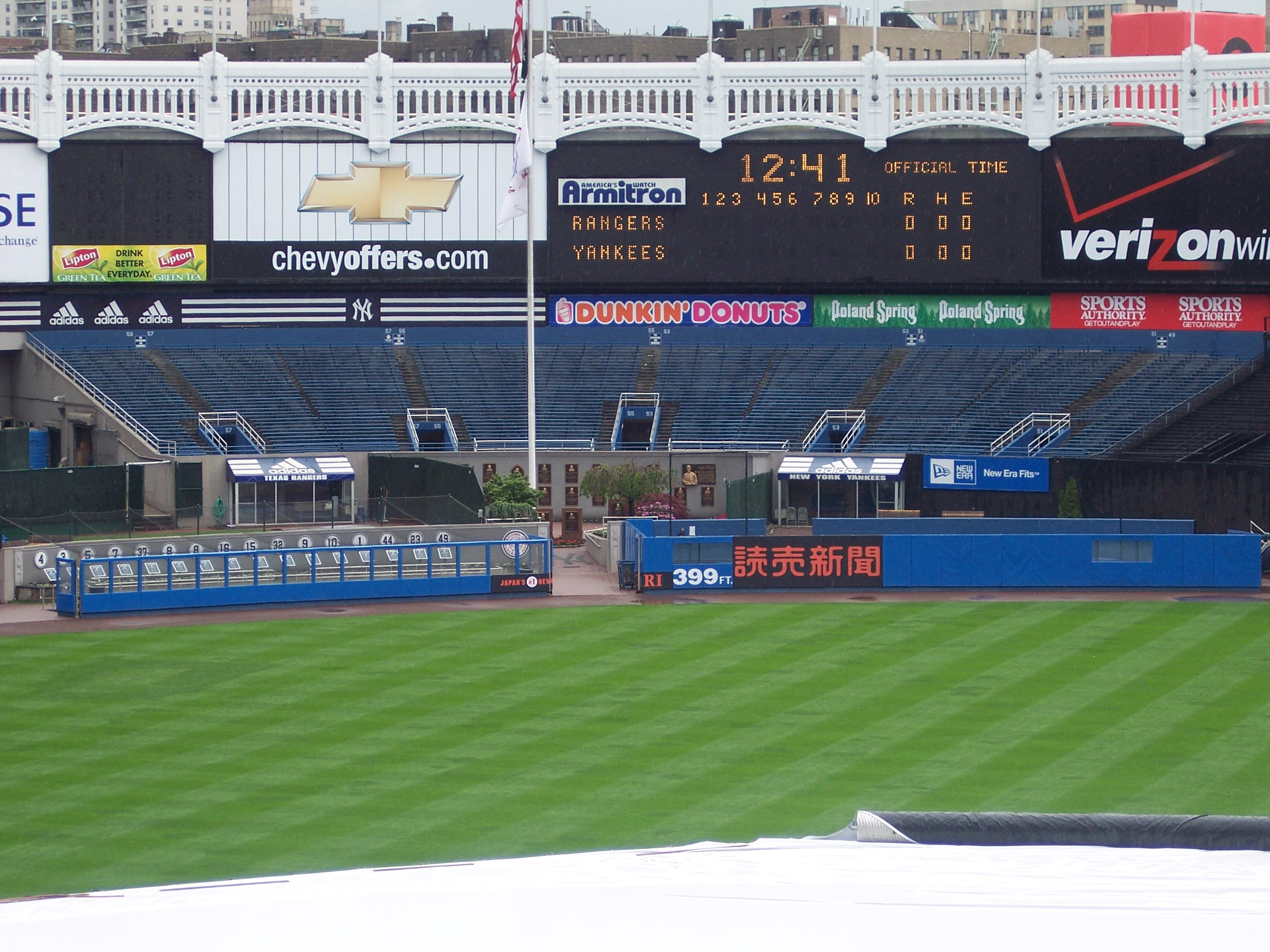
Monument Park from the stadium's pressbox

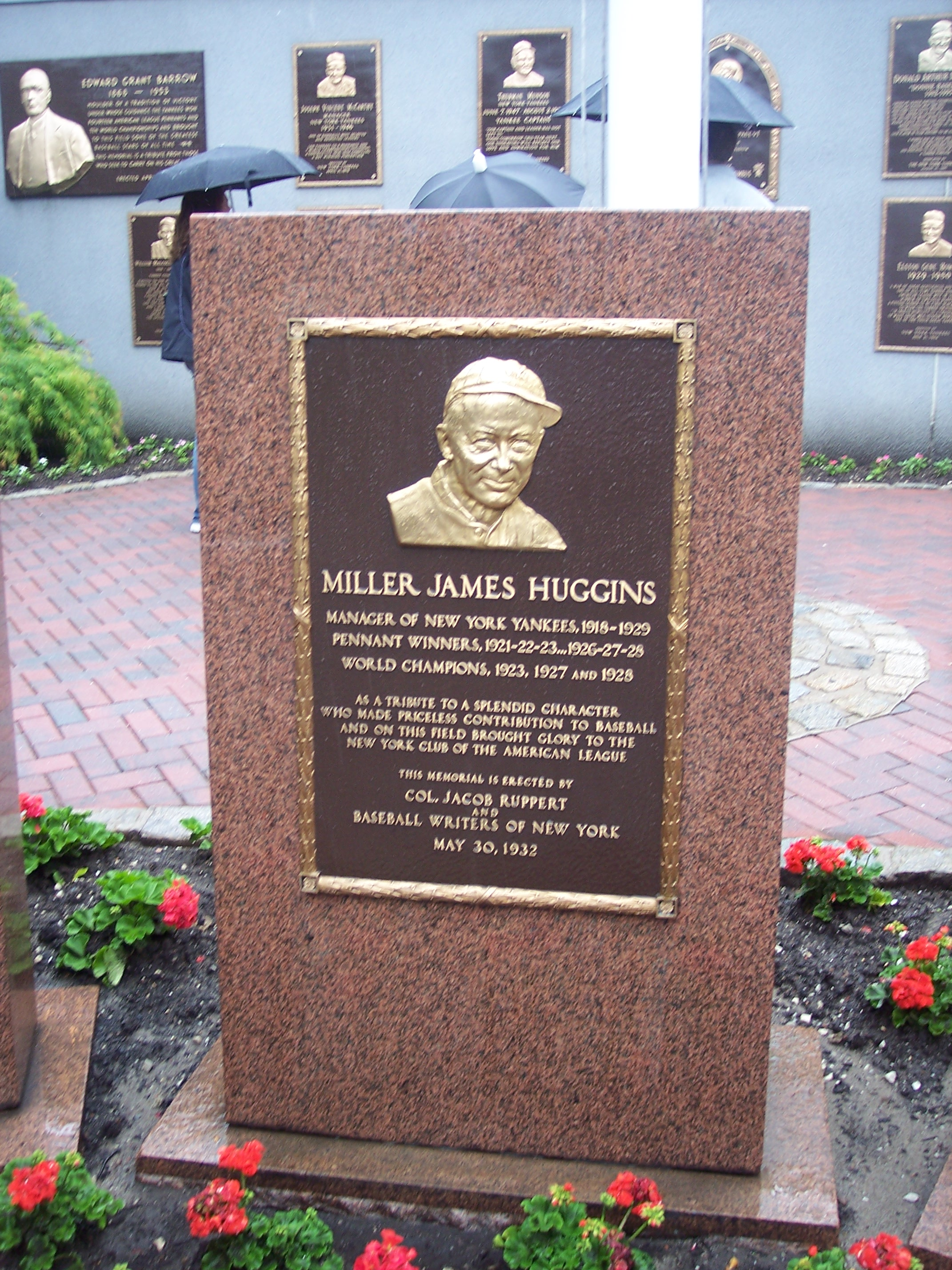
Miller Huggins's monument

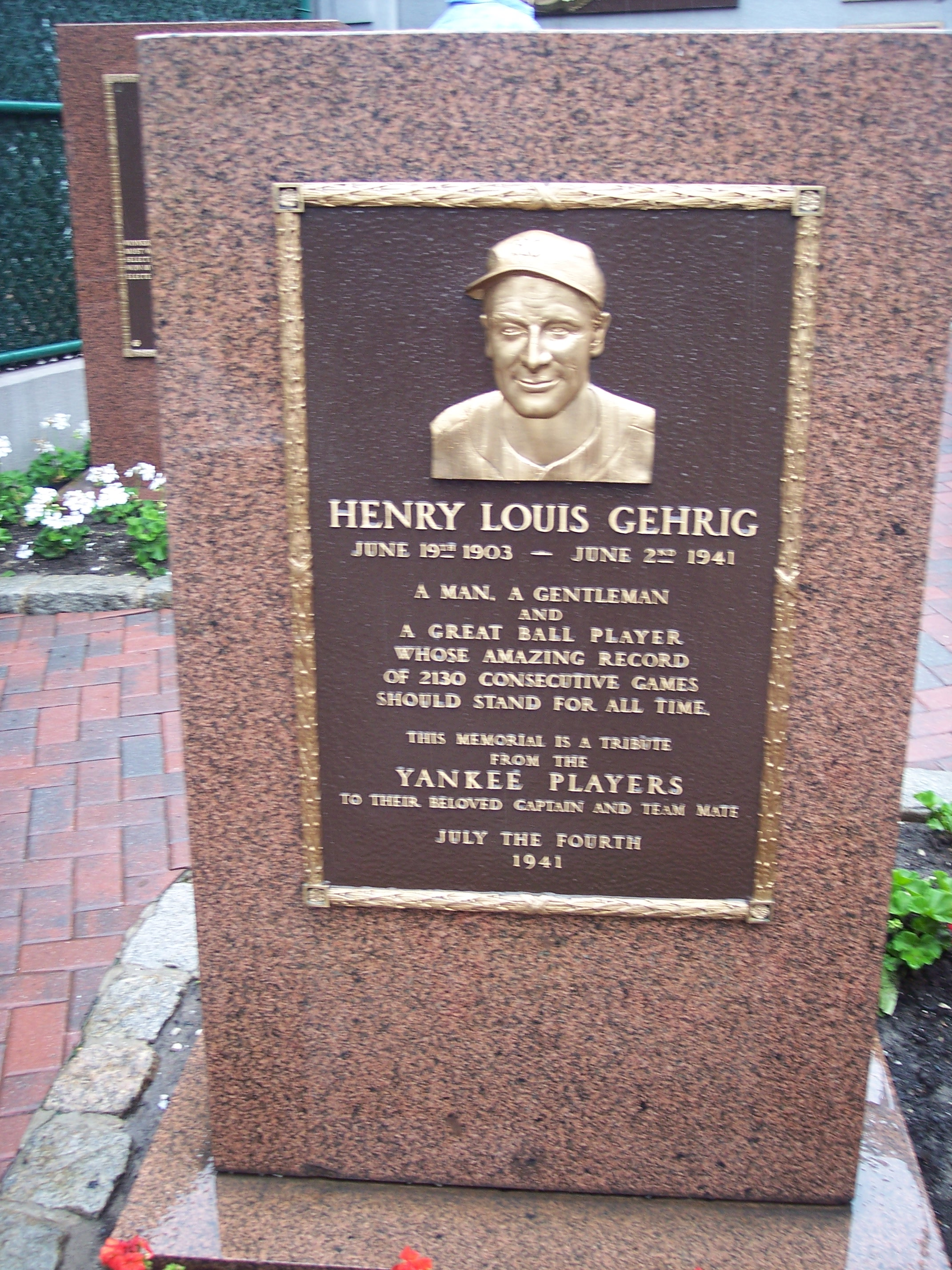
Lou Gehrig's monument

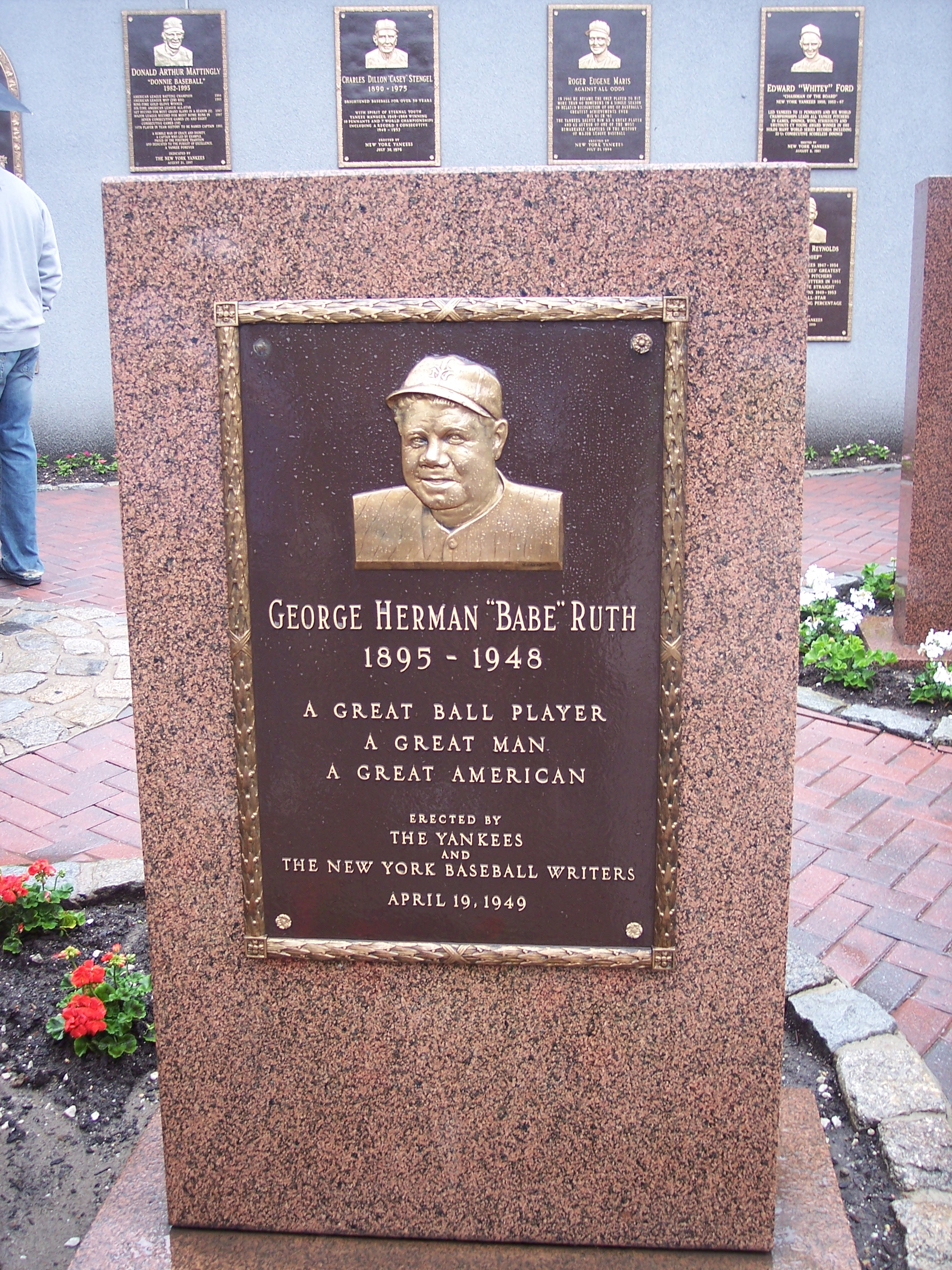
Babe Ruth's monument

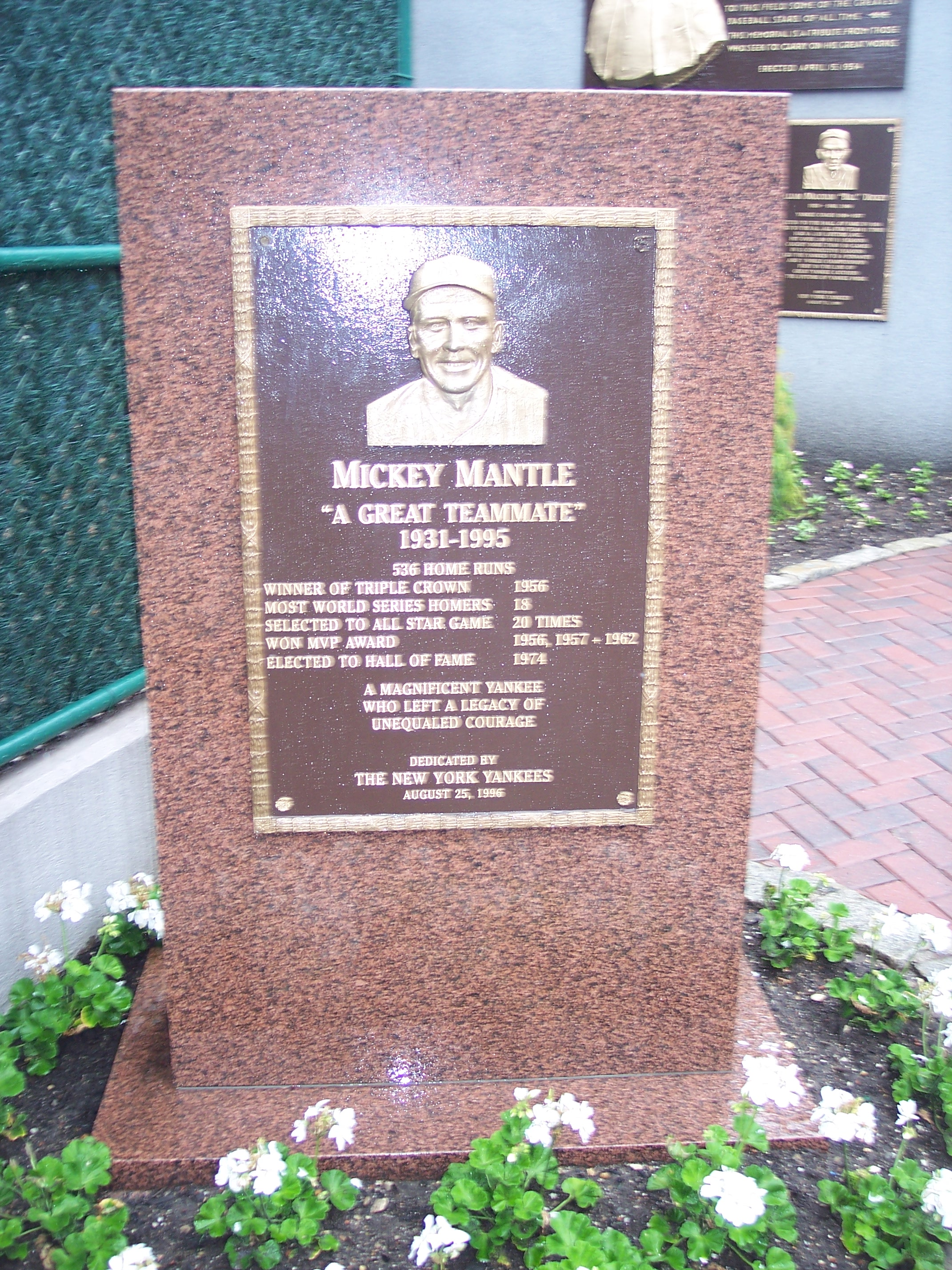
Mickey Mantle's monument

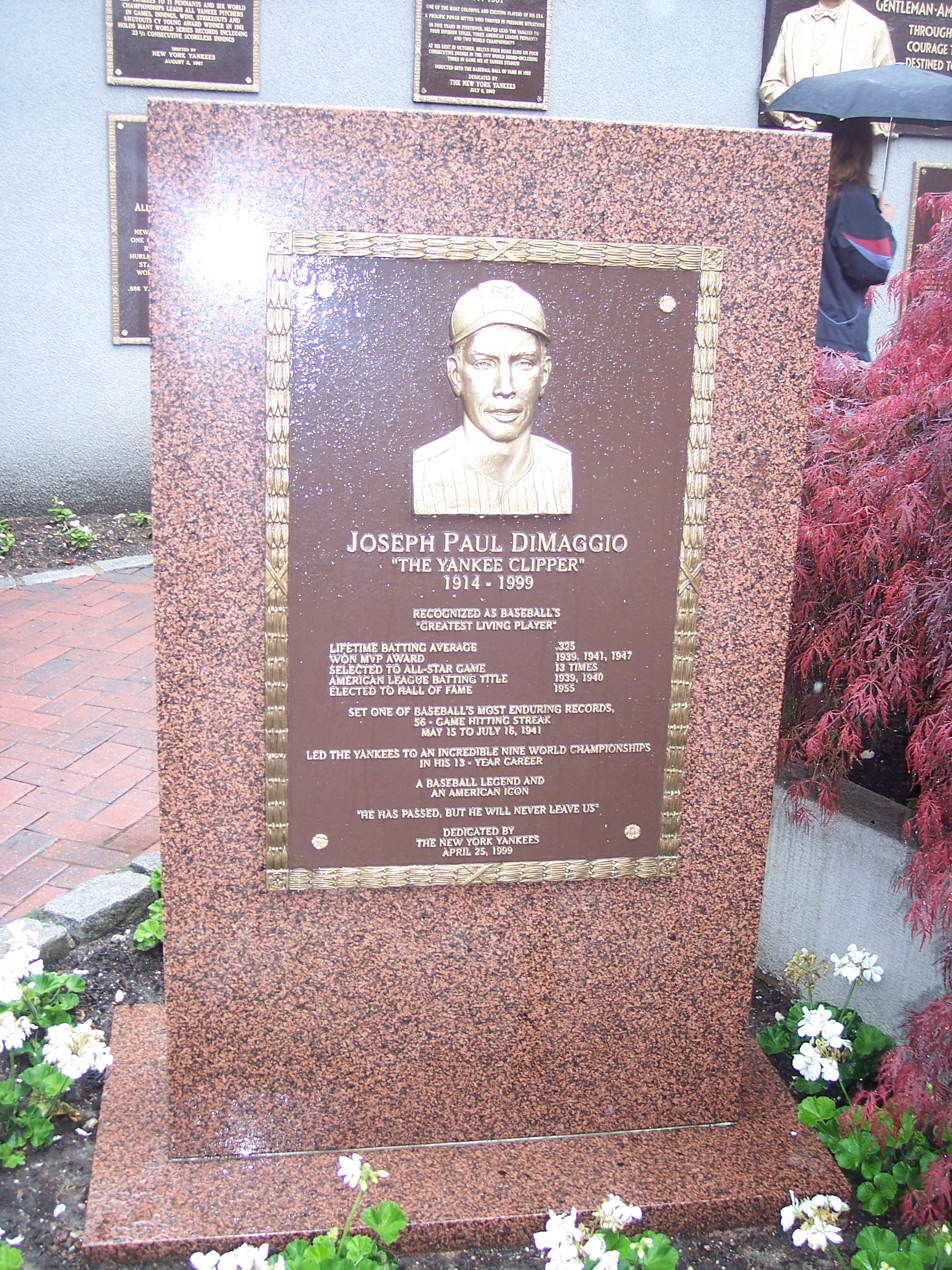
Joe DiMaggio's monument

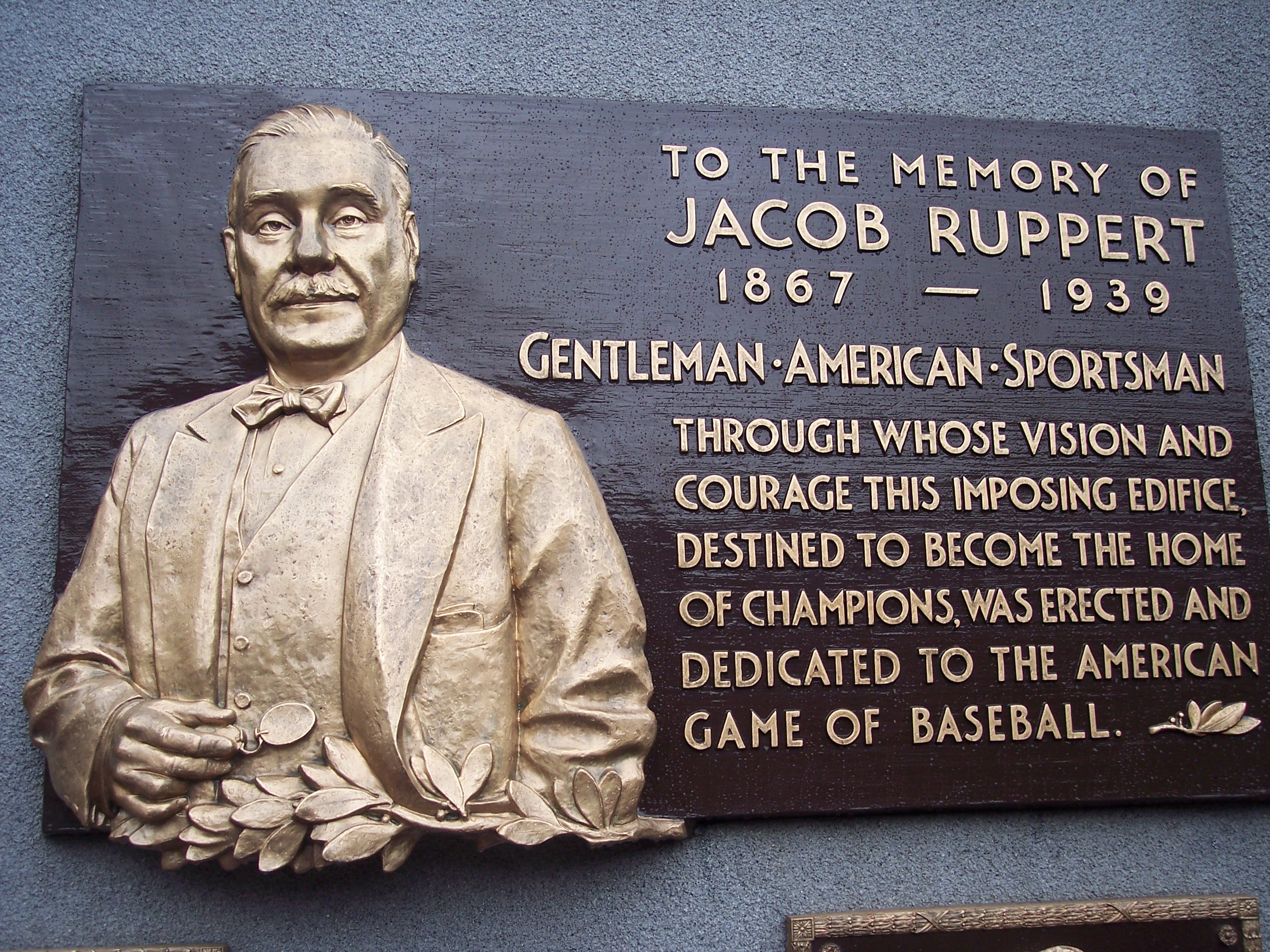
Jacob Ruppert's plaque
Monument Park II

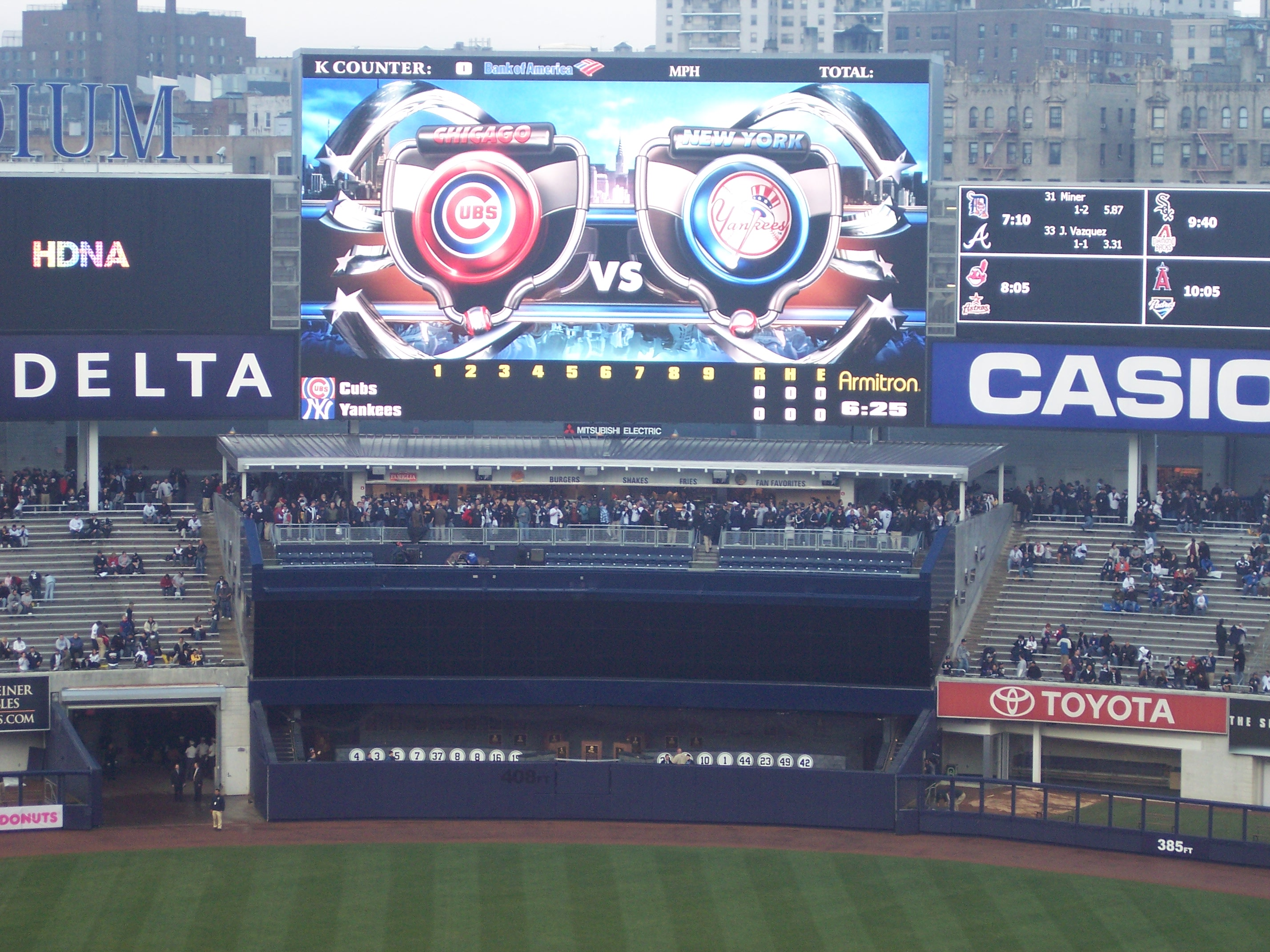
Monument Park and surrounding area

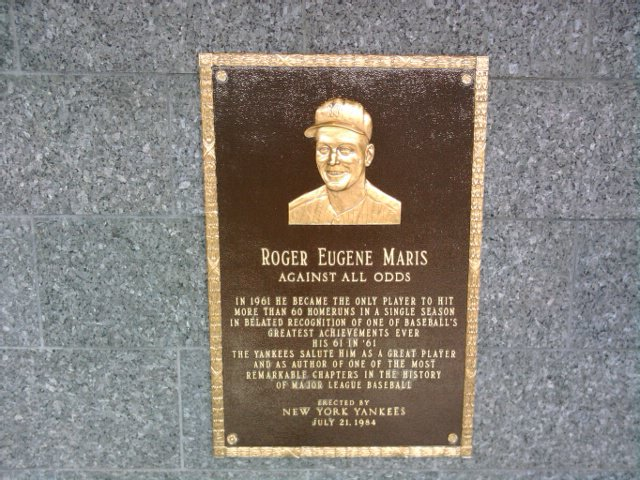
Roger Maris's plaque

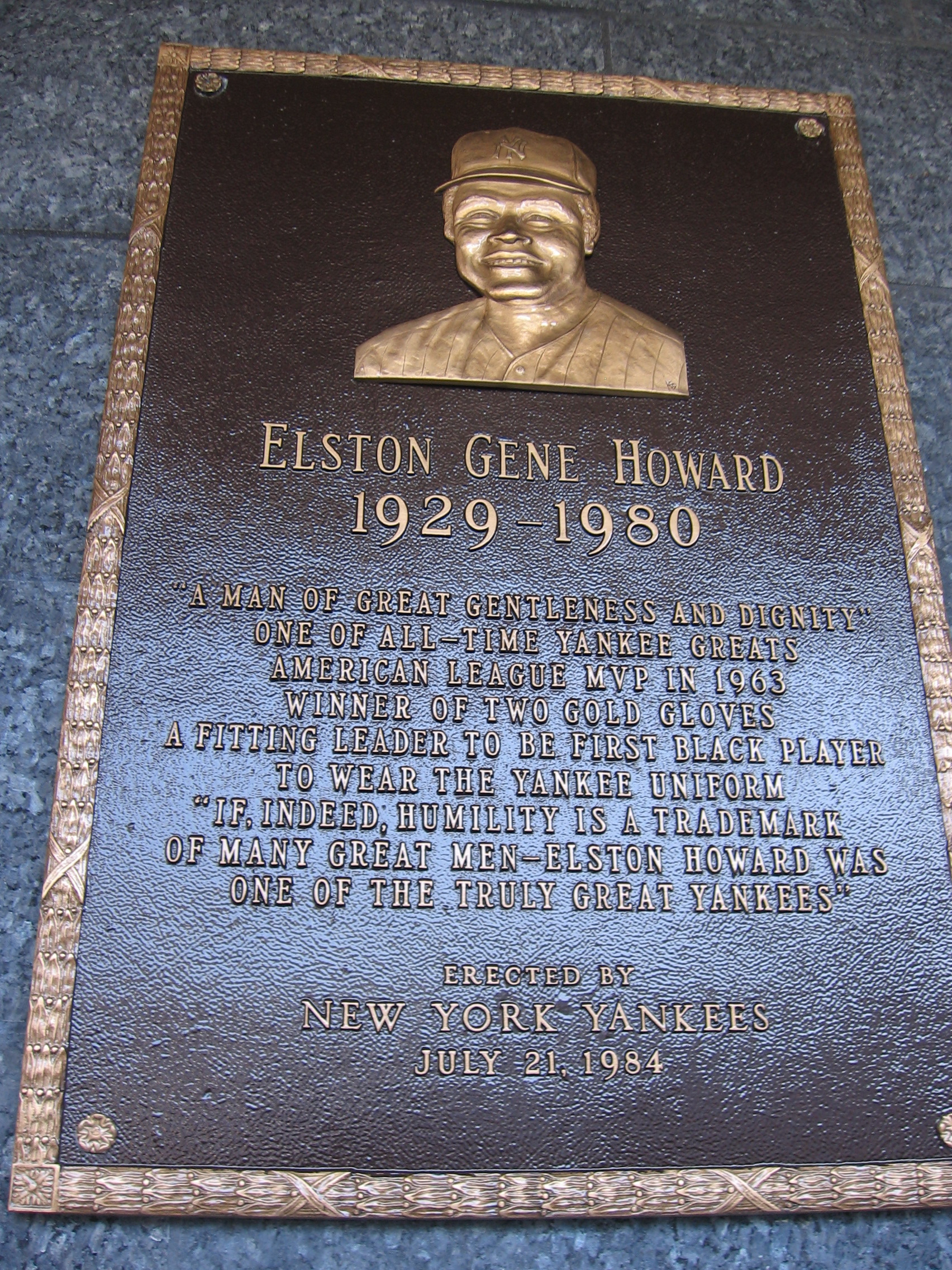
Elston Howard's plaque

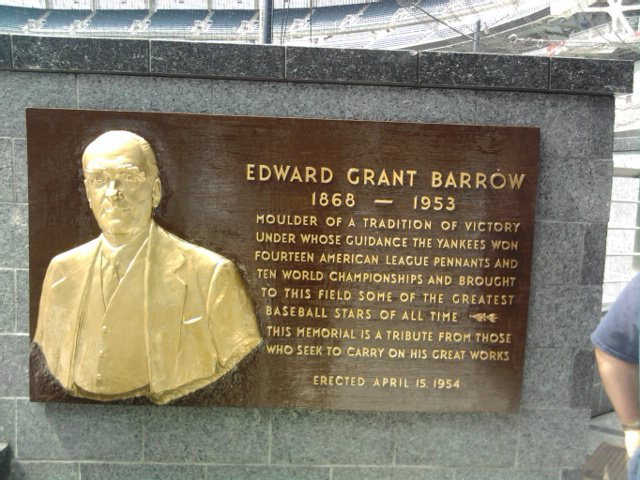
Ed Barrow's plaque

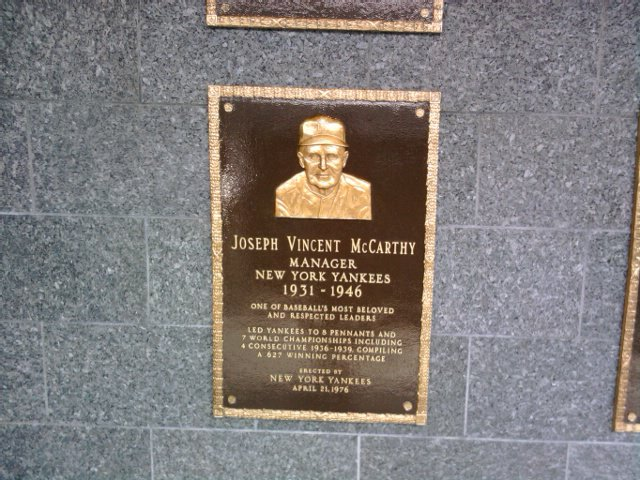
Joe McCarthy's plaque

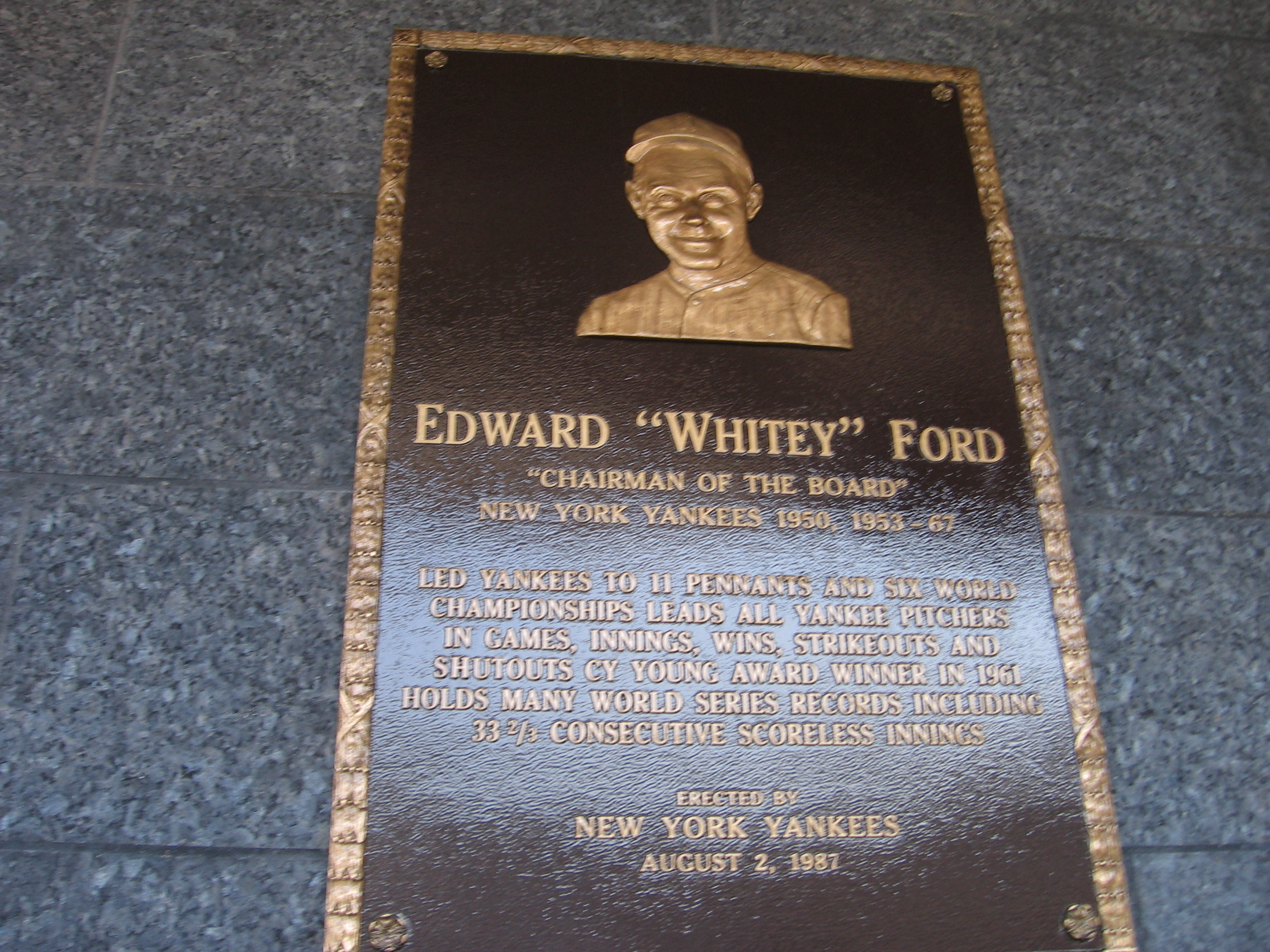
Whitey Ford's plaque

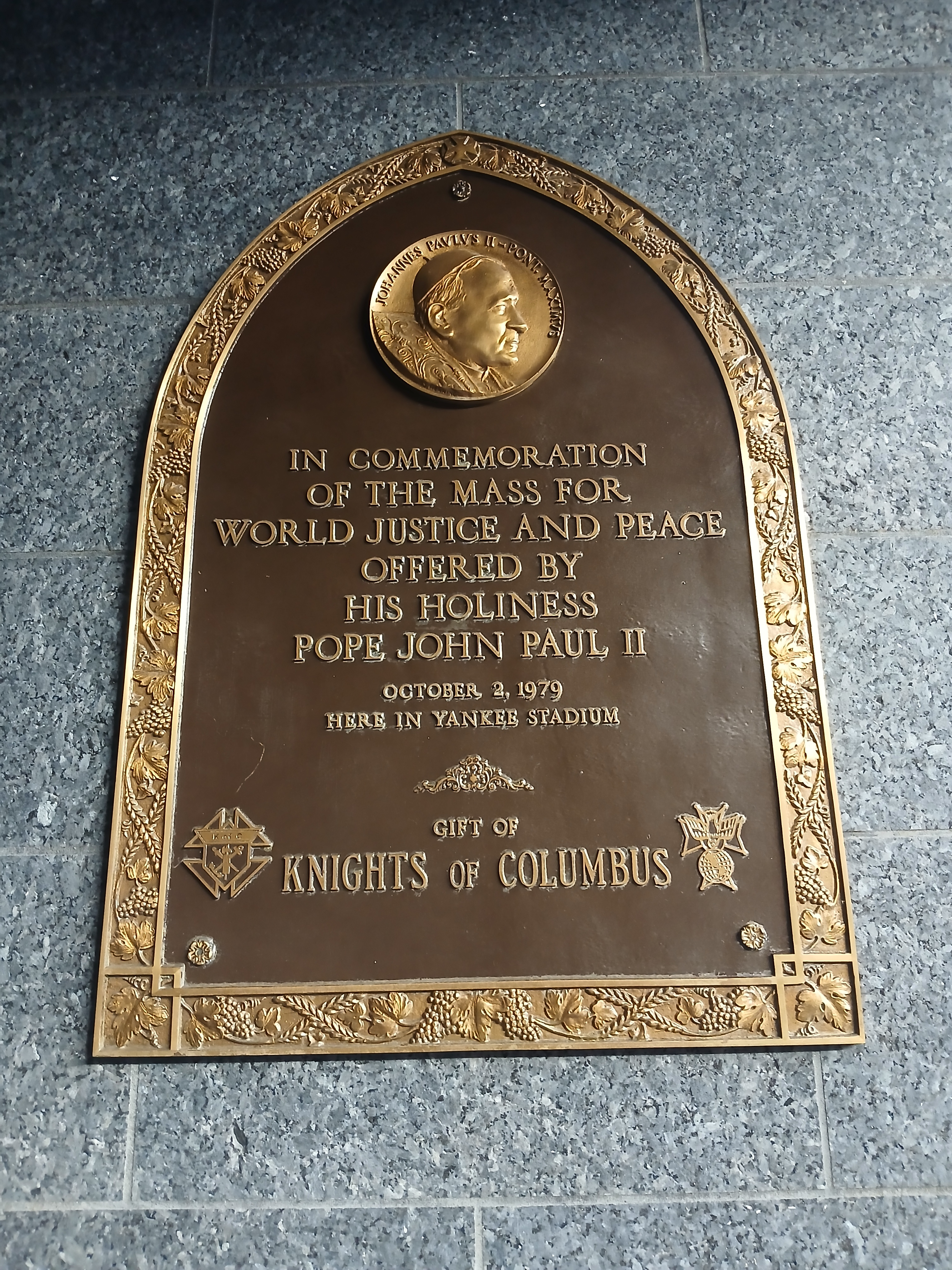
Plaque for Pope John Paul II

== See also ==
- List of New York Yankees in the Baseball Hall of Fame
- New York Yankees Museum
- New York Yankees award winners and league leaders
