= New York Yankees award winners and league leaders =

Lists of baseball players

This is a list of award winners and league leaders for the New York Yankees of Major League Baseball.

== Baseball Hall of Famers ==
Elected mainly for Yankee service

- Ed Barrow, General Manager, 1921–46
- Yogi Berra, C-LF, 1946–63; MGR, 1964, 1984–85
- Jack Chesbro, P, 1903–09
- Earle Combs, CF, 1924–35
- Bill Dickey, C, 1928–43, 1946; MGR, 1946
- Joe DiMaggio, CF, 1936–42, 1946–51
- Whitey Ford, P, 1950, 1953–67
- Lou Gehrig, 1B, 1923–39
- Lefty Gomez, P, 1930–42
- Joe Gordon, 2B 1938-1943, 1946
- Rich "Goose" Gossage, P, 1978–1983, 1989
- Waite Hoyt, P, 1921–30
- Miller Huggins, MGR, 1918–29
- Derek Jeter, SS, 1995-2014
- Willie Keeler, RF, 1903–09
- Tony Lazzeri, 2B, 1926–37
- Mickey Mantle, CF, 1951–68
- Joe McCarthy, MGR, 1931–46
- Herb Pennock, P, 1923–33
- Mariano Rivera, P, 1995-2013
- Phil Rizzuto, SS, 1941–42, 1946–56
- Red Ruffing, P, 1930–42, 1945–46
- Babe Ruth, RF, 1920–34
- CC Sabathia, P, 2009-2019
- Casey Stengel, MGR, 1949–60
- George Weiss, General Manager, 1947–60
- Dave Winfield, LF-RF, 1981–88, 1990

Elected for service with other teams, as well as the Yankees

- Frank Baker, 3B, 1916–19, 1921–22
- Carlos Beltrán, RF, 2014–16
- Wade Boggs, 3B, 1993–97
- Roger Bresnahan, C, 1901–02
- Frank Chance, 1B-MGR, 1913–14
- Stan Coveleski, P, 1928
- Leo Durocher, MGR (2B-SS, 1925, 1928–29)
- Clark Griffith, P-MGR, 1903–07
- Burleigh Grimes, P, 1934
- Bucky Harris, MGR, 1947–48
- Rickey Henderson, LF, 1985–89
- Catfish Hunter, P, 1975–79
- Reggie Jackson, RF, 1977–81*
- Andruw Jones, LF, 2011–12
- Joe Kelley, CF, 1902 (Baltimore)
- Bob Lemon, MGR, 1978–79, 1981–82
- Joe McGinnity, P 1901–02 (Baltimore)
- John McGraw, MGR (3B-MGR, 1901–02)
- Johnny Mize, 1B, 1949–53
- Phil Niekro, P, 1984–85
- Gaylord Perry, P, 1980
- Tim Raines, LF, 1996–98
- Iván Rodríguez, C, 2008
- Wilbert Robinson, C, 1901–02; MGR, 1902 (Baltimore)
- Joe Sewell, 3B, 1931–33
- Enos Slaughter, LF, 1954–55, 1956–59
- Ichiro Suzuki, RF, 2012–14
- Dazzy Vance, P, 1915, 1918
- Paul Waner, RF, 1944–45

(Affiliation according to National Baseball Hall of Fame; Reggie Jackson is affiliated with the Athletics, but wears a New York Yankees cap )

== Major League Baseball awards ==
=== Most Valuable Player ===
- 1923 – Babe Ruth
- 1927 – Lou Gehrig
- 1936 – Lou Gehrig (2)
- 1939 – Joe DiMaggio
- 1941 – Joe DiMaggio (2)
- 1942 – Joe Gordon
- 1943 – Spud Chandler
- 1947 – Joe DiMaggio (3)
- 1950 – Phil Rizzuto
- 1951 – Yogi Berra
- 1954 – Yogi Berra (2)
- 1955 – Yogi Berra (3)
- 1956 – Mickey Mantle
- 1957 – Mickey Mantle (2)
- 1960 – Roger Maris
- 1961 – Roger Maris (2)
- 1962 – Mickey Mantle (3)
- 1963 – Elston Howard
- 1976 – Thurman Munson
- 1985 – Don Mattingly
- 2005 – Alex Rodriguez (2)
- 2007 – Alex Rodriguez (3)
- 2022 – Aaron Judge
- 2024 – Aaron Judge (2)
- 2025 – Aaron Judge (3)

=== Cy Young ===
- 1958 – Bob Turley (MLB)
- 1961 – Whitey Ford (MLB)
- 1977 – Sparky Lyle (AL)
- 1978 – Ron Guidry (AL)
- 2001 – Roger Clemens (AL)
- 2023 – Gerrit Cole (AL)
- 2026 – Cam Schlittler (AL)

=== Rookie of the Year ===
- 1951 – Gil McDougald
- 1954 – Bob Grim
- 1957 – Tony Kubek
- 1962 – Tom Tresh
- 1968 – Stan Bahnsen
- 1970 – Thurman Munson
- 1981 – Dave Righetti
- 1996 – Derek Jeter
- 2017 – Aaron Judge
- 2024 – Luis Gil

=== Manager of the Year ===
See footnote

- Buck Showalter (1994)
- Joe Torre (twice; 1996, tied with Johnny Oates, Texas; 1998)

=== Gold Glove Award ===
Key
†	Elected to the Baseball Hall of Fame

Player	Position	Times Won	Years
Ron Guidry	P	5	1982–86
Bobby Shantz	P	4	1957–60
Mike Mussina^{†}	P	3	2001, 2003, 2008
Max Fried	P	1	2025
Thurman Munson	C	3	1973–75
Elston Howard	C	2	1963–64
Don Mattingly	1B	9	1985–89, 1991–94
Joe Pepitone	1B	3	1965–66, 1969
Mark Teixeira	1B	3	2009–10, 2012
Chris Chambliss	1B	1	1978
Bobby Richardson	2B	5	1961–65
Robinson Canó	2B	2	2010, 2012
Wade Boggs^{†}	3B	2	1994–95
Graig Nettles	3B	2	1977–78
Scott Brosius	3B	1	1999
Derek Jeter^{†}	SS	5	2004–06, 2009–10
Anthony Volpe	SS	1	2023
Bernie Williams	OF	4	1997–2000
Dave Winfield^{†}	OF	5	1982–85, 1987
Cody Bellinger	OF	1	2026
Brett Gardner	OF	1	2016
Mickey Mantle^{†}	OF	1	1962
Roger Maris	OF	1	1960
Bobby Murcer	OF	1	1972
Norm Siebern	OF	1	1958
Tom Tresh	OF	1	1965
Jose Trevino	C	1	2022
DJ LeMahieu	UTIL	1	2022

=== Platinum Glove Award ===
Awarded to the best defensive player in each league, as selected by fans from the year's Gold Glove winners.

- Jose Trevino (2022)
- Cody Bellinger (2026)

=== Wilson Defensive Player of the Year Award ===
Note: In its first two years, the award was given to a player on each MLB team; one awardee was then named the Overall Defensive Player of the Year for the American League and another for the National League. Starting in 2014, the award is now given to one player at each position for all of Major League Baseball; one of the nine awardees is then named the Overall Defensive Player of the Year for all of Major League Baseball.
Team (all positions)

- Robinson Canó (2012, 2013)

Left fielder (in MLB)

- Brett Gardner (2016)

=== Silver Slugger Award ===
Player	Position	Times Won	Years
Don Baylor	DH	2	1983, 1985
Reggie Jackson^{†}	DH	1	1980
Jorge Posada	C	5	2000–03, 2007
Mike Stanley	C	1	1993
Gary Sánchez	C	1	2017
Don Mattingly	1B	3	1985–87
Jason Giambi	1B	1	2002
Tino Martinez	1B	1	1997
Mark Teixeira	1B	1	2009
Robinson Canó	2B	5	2006, 2010–13
Willie Randolph	2B	1	1980
Alfonso Soriano	2B	1	2002
DJ LeMahieu	2B	2	2019–2020
Jazz Chisholm Jr.	2B	1	2025
Alex Rodriguez	3B	3	2005, 2007–2008
Wade Boggs^{†}	3B	2	1993–94
Derek Jeter^{†}	SS	5	2006–2009, 2012
Dave Winfield^{†}	OF	5	1981–85
Gary Sheffield	OF	2	2004–05
Rickey Henderson^{†}	OF	1	1985
Bernie Williams	OF	1	2002
Curtis Granderson	OF	1	2011
Aaron Judge	OF	5	2017, 2021–2022, 2024–2025
Juan Soto	OF	1	2024

=== Comeback Player of the Year Award ===
- 2005 – Jason Giambi
- 2013 – Mariano Rivera

=== Hank Aaron Award (top hitter) ===
- Derek Jeter (2) (2006, 2009)
- Alex Rodriguez (2007)
- Aaron Judge (3) (2022, 2024, 2025)

=== Edgar Martínez Award ===
- Don Baylor (1985)

=== All-MLB Team ===
Player	Position	Times Won	Years
DJ LeMahieu	2B	2	2019 (1st), 2020 (1st)
Cody Bellinger	OF	1	2025 (2nd)
Aaron Judge	OF	5	2021 (1st), 2022 (1st), 2023 (2nd), 2024 (1st), 2025 (1st)
Juan Soto	OF	1	2024 (1st)
Ben Rice	DH	1	2026 (2nd)
Gerrit Cole	SP	3	2020 (2nd), 2021 (1st), 2023 (1st)
Max Fried	SP	1	2025 (1st)
Cam Schlittler	SP	1	2026 (1st)
Aroldis Chapman	RP	1	2019 (2nd)

=== MLB All-Century Team (1999) ===
- Pitcher
  - Roger Clemens
- Catcher
  - Yogi Berra
- First Base
  - Lou Gehrig
- Outfield
  - Joe DiMaggio
  - Mickey Mantle
  - Babe Ruth

=== DHL Hometown Heroes (2006) ===
- Babe Ruth — voted by MLB fans as the most outstanding player in the history of the franchise, based on on-field performance, leadership quality and character value

=== MLB All-Time Team (1997; Baseball Writers' Association of America) ===
- First base
  - Lou Gehrig
- Right field
  - Babe Ruth
- Manager
  - Casey Stengel

=== Sporting News All-Decade Team ===
See: Sporting News#Major-league baseball awards

- Alex Rodriguez, 3B (2009) (also played with Seattle and Texas (2000-2003))
- Derek Jeter, SS (2009)
- Randy Johnson, SP (2009) (Played with the Yankees from 2005–2006. Also played with Arizona (1999–2004; 2007–2008) and San Francisco (2009))
- Mariano Rivera, CP (2009)
- Joe Torre, Manager (2009) (Managed the Yankees from 1996–2007. Also managed the Los Angeles Dodgers (2008-2009))

=== Sports Illustrated MLB All-Decade Team ===
- Alex Rodriguez, 3B (2009) (also played with Seattle and Texas (2000-2003))
- Derek Jeter, SS (2009)
- Randy Johnson, SP (2009) (Played with the Yankees from 2005–2006. Also played with Arizona (1999–2004; 2007–2008) and San Francisco (2009))
- Mariano Rivera, CP (2009)
- Joe Torre, Manager (2009) (Managed the Yankees from 1996–2007. Also managed the Los Angeles Dodgers (2008-2009))

=== USA Today Cy Young ===
- 2005 – Mariano Rivera
- 2010 – CC Sabathia

=== Baseball America All-Rookie Team ===
See: Baseball America#Baseball America All-Rookie Team

- 2011 – Iván Nova (SP; one of five)

=== Topps All-Star Rookie teams ===
- Pitchers
  - Stan Bahnsen (1968)
  - Brian Fisher (1985)
  - Dellin Betances & Masahiro Tanaka (2014)
  - Jordan Montgomery (2017)
- Catchers
  - Thurman Munson (1970)
  - Bob Geren (1989)
  - Gary Sánchez (2016)
- First basemen
  - John Ellis (1970)
  - Nick Johnson (2002)
- Second basemen
  - Willie Randolph (1976)
  - Alfonso Soriano (2001)
  - Gleyber Torres (2018)
- Third basemen
  - Bobby Cox (1968)
  - Miguel Andújar (2018)
- Shortstops
  - Tom Tresh (1962)
  - Derek Jeter (1996)
- Outfielders
  - Melky Cabrera (2006)
  - Aaron Judge (2017)

=== World Series Most Valuable Player Award ===
- Don Larsen (1956)
- Bob Turley (1958)
- Bobby Richardson (1960)
- Whitey Ford (1961)
- Ralph Terry (1962)
- Reggie Jackson (1977)
- Bucky Dent (1978)
- John Wetteland (1996)
- Scott Brosius (1998)
- Mariano Rivera (1999)
- Derek Jeter (2000)
- Hideki Matsui (2009)

=== American League Championship Series Most Valuable Player Award ===
- Graig Nettles (1981)
- Bernie Williams (1996)
- David Wells (1998)
- Orlando Hernández (1999)
- David Justice (2000)
- Andy Pettitte (2001)
- Mariano Rivera (2003)
- CC Sabathia (2009)
- Giancarlo Stanton (2024)

=== Babe Ruth Award (postseason MVP) ===
Note: Before 2007, the award was exclusively for performances in the World Series.

- Joe Page (1949)
- Jerry Coleman (1950)
- Phil Rizzuto (1951)
- Johnny Mize (1952)
- Billy Martin (1953)
- Don Larsen (1956)
- Elston Howard (1958)
- Whitey Ford (1961)
- Ralph Terry (1962)
- Reggie Jackson (1977)
- Bucky Dent (1978)
- Cecil Fielder (1996)
- Scott Brosius (1998)
- Mariano Rivera (1999, 2003)
- Derek Jeter (2000)
- Alex Rodriguez (2009)

=== MLB Insiders Club Magazine All-Postseason Team ===
- 2011 – Robinson Canó (2B)

=== Lou Gehrig Memorial Award ===
- Gil McDougald (1958)
- Bobby Richardson (1963)
- Tommy John (1981)
- Don Mattingly (1993)
- Derek Jeter (2010)

=== MLB All-Time Manager ===
See: Major League Baseball All-Time Team (1997; BBWAA)

- Casey Stengel

=== Sporting News Manager of the Decade ===
See: Sporting News § Major League Baseball

- Joe Torre (2009) (also managed the Los Angeles Dodgers, 2008-09)

=== Sports Illustrated MLB Manager of the Decade ===
- Joe Torre (2009) (also managed the Los Angeles Dodgers, 2008-09)

=== The Sporting News Manager of the Year ===
Note: Established in 1936, this award was given annually to one manager in Major League Baseball. In 1986 it was expanded to honor one manager from each league.
See footnote

- 1936 – Joe McCarthy
- 1938 – Joe McCarthy
- 1943 – Joe McCarthy
- 1947 – Bucky Harris
- 1949 – Casey Stengel
- 1953 – Casey Stengel
- 1958 – Casey Stengel
- 1961 – Ralph Houk
- 1974 – Bill Virdon
- 1994 – Buck Showalter
- 1998 – Joe Torre

=== Associated Press Manager of the Year Award ===
See: Associated Press#AP sports awards
Note: Discontinued in 2001. From 1959 to 1983, the award was given annually to one manager in each league. From 1984 to 2000, the award was given to one manager in all of Major League Baseball.
See footnote

- 1963 – Ralph Houk
- 1970 – Ralph Houk
- 1976 – Billy Martin
- 1978 – Bob Lemon (Also managed the Chicago White Sox in 1978)
- 1998 – Joe Torre

=== Ford C. Frick Award recipients (broadcasters) ===
See "Ford C. Frick Award recipients" at New York Yankees § Hall of Famers

== Team awards ==
=== Team championships and recognitions ===
- 1976 – William Harridge Trophy (American League champion)
- 1977 – World Series Trophy
- 1978 – World Series Trophy
- 1981 – William Harridge Trophy (American League champion)
- 1996 – Commissioner's Trophy (World Series)
- 1997 (1996 New York Yankees) – Outstanding Team ESPY Award
- 1998 – Commissioner's Trophy (World Series)
- 1998 – Baseball America Organization of the Year
- 1999 – Commissioner's Trophy (World Series)
- 1999 (1998 New York Yankees) – Outstanding Team ESPY Award
- 1999 – Sporting News Sportsman of the Year
- 1999 (1927 Yankees) – "ESPN" Number 1 greatest sports team (in 20th century, of the 4 major North American sports leagues)
- 1999 (1939 Yankees) – "ESPN" Number 6 greatest sports team (in 20th century, of the 4 major North American sports leagues)
- 2000 – Commissioner's Trophy (World Series)
- 2001 (2000 New York Yankees) – Outstanding Team ESPY Award
- 2001 – William Harridge Trophy (American League champion)
- 2003 – William Harridge Trophy (American League champion)
- 2009 – Commissioner's Trophy (World Series)
- 2009 – Sports Illustrated MLB Top Single-Season Team of the Decade (2009 Yankees)
- 2009 – Sports Illustrated Best MLB Franchise of the Decade

== Other achievements ==
=== Retired numbers ===
See New York Yankees#Retired numbers

=== James P. Dawson Award ===
The James P. Dawson Award is given at the end of spring training to the best rookie.

- 1956 – Norm Siebern, OF
- 1957 – Tony Kubek, SS
- 1958 – Johnny Blanchard, C
- 1959 – Gordie Windhorn, OF
- 1960 – Johnny James, P
- 1961 – Rollie Sheldon, P
- 1962 – Tom Tresh, SS
- 1963 – Pedro González, 2B
- 1964 – Pete Mikkelsen, P
- 1965 – Arturo López, OF
- 1966 – Roy White, OF
- 1967 – Bill Robinson, OF
- 1968 – Mike Ferraro, 3B
- 1969 – Jerry Kenney, OF, and Bill Burbach, P
- 1970 – John Ellis, 1B / C
- 1971 – None selected
- 1972 – Rusty Torres, OF
- 1973 – Otto Vélez, OF
- 1974 – Tom Buskey, P
- 1975 – Tippy Martinez, P
- 1976 – Willie Randolph, 2B
- 1977 – George Zeber, IF
- 1978 – Jim Beattie, P
- 1979 – Paul Mirabella, P
- 1980 – Mike Griffin, P
- 1981 – Gene Nelson, P
- 1982 – Andre Robertson, SS
- 1983 – Don Mattingly, 1B / OF
- 1984 – José Rijo, P
- 1985 – Scott Bradley, C
- 1986 – Bob Tewksbury, P
- 1987 – Keith Hughes, OF
- 1988 – Al Leiter, P
- 1989 – None selected
- 1990 – Alan Mills, P
- 1991 – Hensley Meulens, OF
- 1992 – Gerald Williams, OF
- 1993 – Mike Humphreys, OF
- 1994 – Sterling Hitchcock, P
- 1995 – None selected
- 1996 – Mark Hutton, P
- 1997 – Jorge Posada, C
- 1998 – Homer Bush, IF
- 1999 – None selected
- 2000 – None selected
- 2001 – Alfonso Soriano, 2B
- 2002 – Nick Johnson, 1B
- 2003 – Hideki Matsui, OF
- 2004 – Bubba Crosby, OF
- 2005 – Andy Phillips, IF
- 2006 – Eric Duncan, IF
- 2007 – Kei Igawa, P
- 2008 – Shelley Duncan, IF / OF
- 2009 – Brett Gardner, OF
- 2010 – Jon Weber, OF
- 2011 – Manny Bañuelos, P
- 2012 – David Phelps, P
- 2013 – Vidal Nuño, P
- 2014 – Masahiro Tanaka, P
- 2015 – Slade Heathcott, OF
- 2016 – Johnny Barbato, P
- 2017 – Gleyber Torres, IF
- 2018 – Miguel Andújar, 3B
- 2019 – Stephen Tarpley, P
- 2020 – Clarke Schmidt, P
- 2021 – Deivi García, P
- 2022 – Clarke Schmidt, P
- 2023 – Anthony Volpe, SS
- 2024 – Spencer Jones, OF
- 2025 – J. C. Escarra, C
- 2026 – Carlos Lagrange, P

=== New York BBWAA chapter awards ===
See: New York BBWAA chapter awards

==== Sid Mercer–Dick Young Player of the Year Award ====
- 1931: Lou Gehrig
- 1936: Joe DiMaggio
- 1937: Tony Lazzeri
- 1941: Joe DiMaggio
- 1943: Bill Dickey
- 1949: Phil Rizzuto
- 1951: Allie Reynolds
- 1956: Mickey Mantle
- 1958: Bob Turley
- 1961: Roger Maris, Mickey Mantle
- 1978: Ron Guidry
- 1984: Don Mattingly
- 1985: Don Mattingly
- 1986: Don Mattingly
- 2005: Alex Rodriguez
- 2007: Alex Rodriguez
- 2014: Dellin Betances

==== Joan Payson Award ====
Note: The award is for excellence in community service.

==== Casey Stengel "You Can Look It Up" Award ====
Note: The award is to honor career achievement for those who went home empty-handed at previous dinners.

==== Joe DiMaggio "Toast of the Town" Award ====
The awards is for a player who has become a New York favorite.

- 1983: Lou Pinella, Bobby Murcer
- 1985: Yogi Berra
- 2022: Aaron Judge
- 2025: Aaron Judge

==== William J. Slocum–Jack Lang Award ====
Note: The award is for long and meritorious service.

==== Ben Epstein–Dan Castellano "Good Guy" Award ====
Note: The award is for candor and accessibility to writers.

==== Willie, Mickey and the Duke Award ====
Note: The award is given to a group of players forever linked in baseball history.

=== World Baseball Classic MVP ===
- 2013 – Robinson Canó (2B) (2013 World Baseball Classic § All-WBC team)

=== Associated Press Athlete of the Year ===
- 1941 – Joe DiMaggio
- 1956 – Mickey Mantle
- 1961 – Roger Maris
- 1978 – Ron Guidry

=== Hickok Belt ===
Note: The Hickok Belt trophy was originally awarded to the top professional athlete of the year in the U.S., from 1950 to 1976. It was then revived and has been awarded since 2012.

- 1950 – Phil Rizzuto
- 1951 – Allie Reynolds
- 1956 – Mickey Mantle
- 1958 – Bob Turley
- 1961 – Roger Maris

=== Sporting News Sportsman of the Year ===
See: Sporting News#Sportsman of the Year

- 1978 – Ron Guidry
- 1996 – Joe Torre
- 1999 – New York Yankees

=== Sporting News Pro Athlete of the Year ===
See: Sporting News#Pro Athlete of the Year

- 2009 – Mariano Rivera

=== Sports Illustrated Sportsman of the Year ===
- 2009 – Derek Jeter

=== Sports Illustrated Top 20 Male Athletes of the Decade ===
See: List of 2009 all-decade Sports Illustrated awards and honors#Top 20 Male Athletes of the Decade

- 2009 – Mariano Rivera (#11)
- 2009 – Derek Jeter (#18)
- 2009 – Alex Rodriguez (#20)

=== Sports Illustrated Top 10 Coaches/Managers of the Decade (2009) ===
See: List of 2009 all-decade Sports Illustrated awards and honors#Top 10 Coaches/Managers of the Decade

- No. 3 – Joe Torre, Yankees–Dodgers (the list's only other MLB manager was Boston's Terry Francona, No. 4)

=== Best Coach/Manager ESPY Award ===
- Joe Torre (1997, 1999, 2000, 2001)

== Minor-league system ==
=== Baseball America Minor League Player of the Year Award ===
- Derek Jeter, 1994

=== MiLB George M. Trautman Award / Topps Player of the Year ===
- 2009 – Shelley Duncan (International League; Scranton/Wilkes-Barre; OF) & Austin Romine (Florida State League; Tampa; C)

=== Kevin Lawn Awards ===
The Kevin Lawn Awards are given annually to the best minor league baseball player and pitcher in the Yankees' organization.

Player of the Year
Year	Player	Position	Team(s)
1980	Steve Balboni	1B	Nashville Sounds
1981	Don Mattingly	1B	Nashville Sounds
1982	Matt Winters	OF	Greensboro Bats/Nashville Sounds
1983	Brian Dayett	OF	Columbus Clippers
1984	Scott Bradley	C/OF	Columbus Clippers
1985	Dan Pasqua	OF	Columbus Clippers
1986	Chris Alvarez	3B	Fort Lauderdale Yankees
1987	Darren Reed	OF	Columbus Clippers
1988	Kevin Maas	1B	Prince William Yankees/Albany-Colonie Yankees
1989	Hal Morris	1B	Columbus Clippers
1990	Hensley Meulens	OF	Columbus Clippers
1991	Kiki Hernandez	C	Greensboro Bats/Prince William Cannons
1991	Dave Silvestri	SS	Albany-Colonie Yankees
1992	J. T. Snow	1B	Columbus Clippers
1993	Billy Masse	OF	Columbus Clippers
1994	Derek Jeter	SS	Tampa Yankees/Albany-Colonie Yankees/Columbus Clippers
1995	Derek Jeter	SS	Columbus Clippers
1996	Ricky Ledee	OF	Columbus Clippers/Norwich Navigators
1997	Mike Lowell	3B	Columbus Clippers/Norwich Navigators
1998	Nick Johnson	1B	Tampa Yankees
1999	Nick Johnson	1B	Norwich Navigators
1999	D'Angelo Jiménez	2B	Columbus Clippers
2000	Scott Seabol	3B	Norwich Navigators
2001	Juan Rivera	OF	Columbus Clippers/Norwich Navigators
2001	Marcus Thames	OF	Norwich Navigators
2002	Andy Phillips	2B	Columbus Clippers/Norwich Navigators
2003	Dioner Navarro	C	Tampa Yankees/Trenton Thunder
2004	Andy Phillips	1B	Columbus Clippers/Trenton Thunder
2005	Kevin Thompson	OF	Columbus Clippers/Trenton Thunder
2006	Cody Ehlers	1B	Tampa Yankees
2007	Austin Jackson	OF	Charleston RiverDogs/Tampa Yankees/Scranton/Wilkes-Barre Yankees
2008	Brett Gardner	OF	Scranton/Wilkes-Barre Yankees
2009	Austin Romine	C	Tampa Yankees
2010	Eduardo Núñez	SS	Scranton/Wilkes-Barre Yankees
2011	Austin Romine	C	Trenton Thunder/Scranton/Wilkes-Barre Yankees
2012	Tyler Austin	OF	Gulf Coast Yankees/Charleston RiverDogs/Tampa Yankees/Trenton Thunder
2013	Greg Bird	1B	Charleston RiverDogs
2014	Rob Refsnyder	2B	Trenton Thunder/Scranton/Wilkes-Barre RailRiders
2015	Gary Sánchez	C	Trenton Thunder/Scranton/Wilkes-Barre RailRiders
2016	Aaron Judge	OF	Scranton/Wilkes-Barre RailRiders
2017	Miguel Andújar	3B	Scranton/Wilkes-Barre RailRiders
2018	Brandon Wagner	INF	Tampa Tarpons/Trenton Thunder
2019	Chris Gittens	1B	Trenton Thunder
2020	Season cancelled due to COVID-19		
2021	Anthony Volpe	SS	Tampa Tarpons/Hudson Valley Renegades

Pitcher of the Year
Year	Pitcher	Handedness	Team(s)
1980	Gene Nelson	RHP	Fort Lauderdale Yankees
1981	Pete Filson	LHP	Fort Lauderdale Yankees/Nashville Sounds
1982	Bob Tewksbury	RHP	Fort Lauderdale Yankees
1983	José Rijo	RHP	Fort Lauderdale Yankees/Nashville Sounds
1984	Jim Deshaies	LHP	Nashville Sounds/Columbus Clippers
1985	Brad Arnsberg	RHP	Albany-Colonie Yankees
1986	Logan Easley	RHP	Albany-Colonie Yankees
1987	Dana Ridenour	RHP	Fort Lauderdale Yankees
1988	Todd Malone	RHP	Gulf Coast Yankees
1989	Steve Adkins	LHP	Fort Lauderdale Yankees/Albany-Colonie Yankees
1990	Dave Eiland	RHP	Columbus Clippers
1991	Ed Martel	RHP	Albany-Colonie Yankees/Columbus Clippers
1991	Sam Militello	RHP	Prince William Cannons/Albany-Colonie Yankees
1992	Sam Militello	RHP	Columbus Clippers
1993	Ryan Karp	LHP	Albany-Colonie Yankees/Prince William Yankees/Greensboro Bats
1994	Andy Pettitte	LHP	Columbus Clippers/Albany-Colonie Yankees
1995	Matt Drews	RHP	Tampa Yankees
1996	Jay Tessmer	RHP	Tampa Yankees
1997	Eric Milton	LHP	Norwich Navigators/Tampa Yankees
1998	Ryan Bradley	RHP	Tampa Yankees/Norwich Navigators/Columbus Clippers
1999	Ed Yarnall	RHP	Columbus Clippers
2000	Randy Keisler	RHP	Columbus Clippers
2001	Brandon Claussen	LHP	Norwich Navigators/Tampa Yankees
2002	Jorge DePaula	RHP	Norwich Navigators
2002	Danny Borrell	LHP	Norwich Navigators/Tampa Yankees
2003	Jorge DePaula	RHP	Columbus Clippers
2004	Chien-Ming Wang	RHP	Trenton Thunder/Columbus Clippers
2005	Matt DeSalvo	RHP	Trenton Thunder
2006	Phil Hughes	RHP	Trenton Thunder
2007	Ian Kennedy	RHP	Tampa Yankees/Trenton Thunder/Scranton/Wilkes-Barre Yankees
2008	Phil Coke	LHP	Trenton Thunder/Scranton/Wilkes-Barre Yankees
2009	Zach McAllister	RHP	Trenton Thunder
2010	David Phelps	RHP	Trenton Thunder/Scranton/Wilkes-Barre Yankees
2011	D. J. Mitchell	RHP	Scranton/Wilkes-Barre Yankees
2012	Mark Montgomery	RHP	Tampa Yankees/Trenton Thunder
2013	Shane Greene	RHP	Tampa Yankees/Trenton Thunder
2014	Luis Severino	RHP	Charleston RiverDogs/Tampa Yankees/Trenton Thunder
2015	Luis Severino	RHP	Trenton Thunder/Scranton/Wilkes-Barre RailRiders
2016	Chance Adams	RHP	Tampa Yankees/Trenton Thunder
2017	Domingo Acevedo	RHP	Tampa Yankees/Trenton Thunder/Scranton/Wilkes-Barre RailRiders
2018	Michael King	RHP	Tampa Tarpons/Trenton Thunder/Scranton/Wilkes-Barre RailRiders
2019	Deivi García	RHP	Tampa Tarpons/Trenton Thunder/Scranton/Wilkes-Barre RailRiders
2020	Season cancelled due to COVID-19		
2021	Hayden Wesneski	RHP	Hudson Valley Renegades/Somerset Patriots/Scranton/Wilkes-Barre RailRiders

== League leaders ==
=== Hitting ===
==== Batting champions ====
- 1924 – Babe Ruth (.378)
- 1934 – Lou Gehrig (.363)
- 1939 – Joe DiMaggio (.381)
- 1940 – Joe DiMaggio (.352)
- 1945 – Snuffy Stirnweiss (.309)
- 1956 – Mickey Mantle (.353)
- 1984 – Don Mattingly (.343)
- 1994 – Paul O'Neill (.359)
- 1998 – Bernie Williams (.339)
- 2020 – DJ LeMahieu (.364)
- 2025 – Aaron Judge (.331)

==== Doubles ====
- 1927 – Lou Gehrig (52)
- 1928 – Lou Gehrig (47)
- 1939 – Red Rolfe (46)
- 1984 – Don Mattingly (44)
- 1985 – Don Mattingly (48)
- 1986 – Don Mattingly (53)

==== Triples ====
- 1924 – Wally Pipp (19)
- 1926 – Lou Gehrig (20)
- 1927 – Earle Combs (23)
- 1928 – Lou Gehrig (21)
- 1930 – Earle Combs (22)
- 1934 – Ben Chapman (13)
- 1936 – Joe DiMaggio & Red Rolfe (15)
- 1943 – Johnny Lindell (12)
- 1944 – Johnny Lindell & Snuffy Stirnweiss (16)
- 1945 – Snuffy Stirnweiss (22)
- 1947 – Tommy Henrich (13)
- 1948 – Tommy Henrich (14)
- 1955 – Andy Carey & Mickey Mantle (11)
- 1957 – Hank Bauer & Gil McDougald (9)
- 2013 – Brett Gardner (10)

==== Home runs ====
- 1916 – Wally Pipp (12)
- 1917 – Wally Pipp (9)
- 1920 – Babe Ruth (54)
- 1921 – Babe Ruth (59)
- 1923 – Babe Ruth (41)
- 1924 – Babe Ruth (46)
- 1925 – Bob Meusel (33)
- 1926 – Babe Ruth (47)
- 1927 – Babe Ruth (60)
- 1928 – Babe Ruth (54)
- 1929 – Babe Ruth (46)
- 1930 – Babe Ruth (49)
- 1931 – Babe Ruth & Lou Gehrig (46)
- 1934 – Lou Gehrig (49)
- 1936 – Lou Gehrig (49)
- 1937 – Joe DiMaggio (46)
- 1944 – Nick Etten (22)
- 1948 – Joe DiMaggio (39)
- 1955 – Mickey Mantle (37)
- 1956 – Mickey Mantle (52)
- 1958 – Mickey Mantle (42)
- 1960 – Mickey Mantle (40)
- 1961 – Roger Maris (61)
- 1976 – Graig Nettles (32)
- 1980 – Reggie Jackson (41)
- 2005 – Alex Rodriguez (48)
- 2007 – Alex Rodriguez (54)
- 2009 – Mark Teixeira (39)
- 2017 – Aaron Judge (52)
- 2020 – Luke Voit (22)
- 2022 – Aaron Judge (62)
- 2024 – Aaron Judge (58)

==== Runs batted in ====
- 1920 – Babe Ruth (135)
- 1921 – Babe Ruth (168)
- 1923 – Babe Ruth (130)
- 1925 – Bob Meusel (138)
- 1926 – Babe Ruth (153)
- 1927 – Lou Gehrig (173)
- 1930 – Lou Gehrig (173)
- 1931 – Lou Gehrig (185)
- 1934 – Lou Gehrig (165)
- 1941 – Joe DiMaggio (125)
- 1945 – Nick Etten (111)
- 1948 – Joe DiMaggio (155)
- 1956 – Mickey Mantle (130)
- 1960 – Roger Maris (112)
- 1961 – Roger Maris (141)
- 1985 – Don Mattingly (145)
- 2007 – Alex Rodriguez (156)
- 2009 – Mark Teixeira (122)
- 2011 – Curtis Granderson (119)
- 2022 – Aaron Judge (131)
- 2024 – Aaron Judge (144)

==== Stolen bases ====
- 1914 – Fritz Maisel (74)
- 1931 – Ben Chapman (61)
- 1932 – Ben Chapman (38)
- 1933 – Ben Chapman (27)
- 1938 – Frankie Crosetti (27)
- 1944 – Snuffy Stirnweiss (55)
- 1945 – Snuffy Stirnweiss (33)
- 1985 – Rickey Henderson (80)
- 1986 – Rickey Henderson (87)
- 1988 – Rickey Henderson (93)
- 1989 – Rickey Henderson (77)
- 2002 – Alfonso Soriano (41)
- 2011 – Brett Gardner (49)

=== Pitching ===
==== Wins ====
- 1904 – Jack Chesbro (41)
- 1906 – Al Orth (27)
- 1921 – Carl Mays (27)
- 1927 – Waite Hoyt (22)
- 1928 – George Pipgras (24)
- 1934 – Lefty Gomez (26)
- 1937 – Lefty Gomez (21)
- 1938 – Red Ruffing (21)
- 1943 – Spud Chandler (20)
- 1955 – Whitey Ford (18)
- 1958 – Bob Turley (21)
- 1961 – Whitey Ford (25)
- 1962 – Ralph Terry (23)
- 1963 – Whitey Ford (24)
- 1975 – Catfish Hunter (23)
- 1978 – Ron Guidry (25)
- 1985 – Ron Guidry (22)
- 1994 – Jimmy Key (17)
- 1996 – Andy Pettitte (21)
- 1998 – David Cone (20)
- 2009 – CC Sabathia (19)
- 2010 – CC Sabathia (21)
- 2021 – Gerrit Cole (16)
- 2025 – Max Fried (19)

==== Saves ====
- 1916 – Bob Shawkey (8)
- 1918 – George Mogridge (7)
- 1919 – Bob Shawkey (5)
- 1921 – Carl Mays (7)
- 1922 – Sad Sam Jones (8)
- 1927 – Wilcy Moore (13)
- 1928 – Waite Hoyt (8)
- 1936 – Pat Malone (9)
- 1938 – Johnny Murphy (11)
- 1939 – Johnny Murphy (19)
- 1941 – Johnny Murphy (15)
- 1942 – Johnny Murphy (11)
- 1945 – Jim Turner (10)
- 1947 – Joe Page (17)
- 1949 – Joe Page (27)
- 1954 – Johnny Sain (22)
- 1957 – Bob Grim (19)
- 1958 – Ryne Duren (20)
- 1961 – Luis Arroyo (29)
- 1972 – Sparky Lyle (35)
- 1976 – Sparky Lyle (23)
- 1978 – Goose Gossage (27)
- 1980 – Goose Gossage (33)
- 1986 – Dave Righetti (46)
- 1996 – John Wetteland (43)
- 1999 – Mariano Rivera (45)
- 2001 – Mariano Rivera (50)
- 2004 – Mariano Rivera (53)

==== Earned run average ====
- 1920 – Bob Shawkey (2.45)
- 1927 – Wilcy Moore (2.28)
- 1934 – Lefty Gomez (2.33)
- 1937 – Lefty Gomez (2.33)
- 1943 – Spud Chandler (1.64)
- 1952 – Allie Reynolds (2.06)
- 1953 – Eddie Lopat (2.42)
- 1956 – Whitey Ford (2.47)
- 1957 – Bobby Shantz (2.45)
- 1958 – Whitey Ford (2.01)
- 1978 – Ron Guidry (1.74)
- 1979 – Ron Guidry (2.78)
- 1980 – Rudy May (2.46)
- 2023 – Gerrit Cole (2.63)

==== Strikeouts ====
- 1932 – Red Ruffing (190)
- 1933 – Lefty Gomez (163)
- 1934 – Lefty Gomez (158)
- 1937 – Lefty Gomez (194)
- 1951 – Vic Raschi (164)
- 1952 – Allie Reynolds (160)
- 1964 – Al Downing (217)
- 2022 – Gerrit Cole (257)

== See also ==
- New York Yankees Museum
- Baseball awards
- List of MLB awards
