= New York Yankees Museum =

Baseball museum in The Bronx, Located in Yankee Stadium.

Coordinates: 40°49′42.65″N 73°55′34.7″W

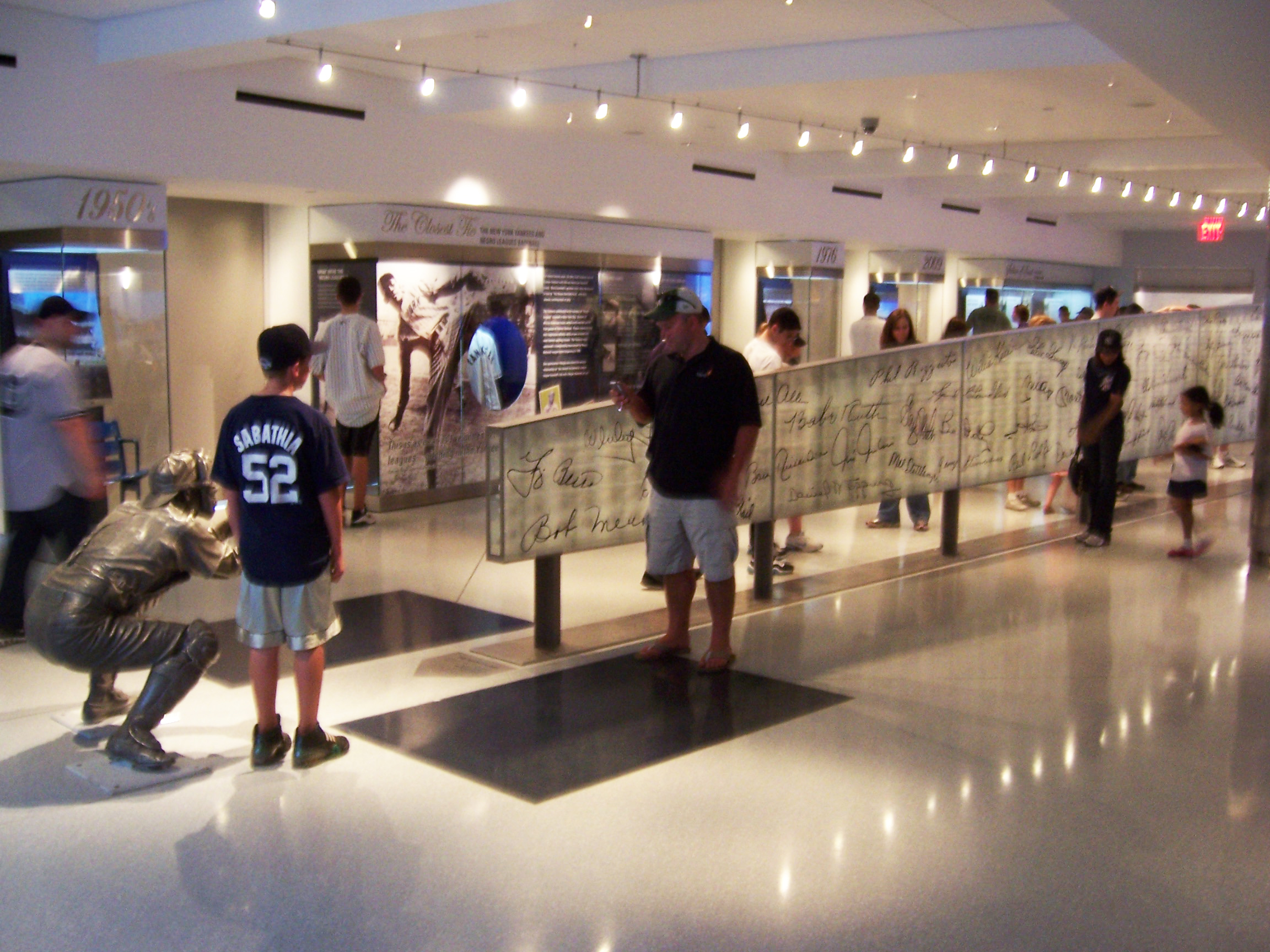
The centerpiece of the New York Yankees Museum is the "Ball Wall", a collection of autographs of current and former Yankees players.

The New York Yankees Museum is a sports museum located at Yankee Stadium on the main level at Gate 6. It is sponsored and presented by Bank of America and is dedicated to baseball memorabilia for the New York Yankees. It is a key attraction at the stadium, which opened in 2009.

== Development ==
When the Yankees developed the new stadium, the museum was in its plans. Bronx Borough President Adolfo Carrión, Jr. called for the museum to function as a "Cooperstown South".

== Features ==
A "Ball Wall" features hundreds of balls autographed by past and present Yankees, and there are plans to eventually add autographs for every living player who has played for the Yankees. The Yankees Ball Finder, a touch-screen computer in the museum, allows the viewer to look for Yankees alphabetically to find the location of their ball on the "Ball Wall".

The centerpiece of the museum is a tribute to Don Larsen's perfect game in the 1956 World Series, with a commemorative home plate in the floor and statues of Larsen pitching to Yogi Berra. Along with a facsimile of a current locker from the Yankees' clubhouse, fans can view the locker of Thurman Munson, which sat unoccupied in the previous stadium's Yankee clubhouse in honor of Munson.

The final pitcher's plate and home plate used at the old stadium was the first at the new stadium; following its use, it was moved to the museum.

For the 2011 season, the Yankees added a showcase of World Series rings. During the season, they opened an exhibit to honor George Steinbrenner, who died the year before. The baseball uniform that Derek Jeter wore during the game he achieved his 3,000th hit is in the Yankees Museum. The museum also has three of the eight authenticated Babe Ruth game-worn uniforms, including the uniform from his called shot, game-used baseball bats, and his 1927 World Series ring.

== See also ==
- Monument Park (Yankee Stadium)
- New York Yankees award winners and league leaders
- Yogi Berra Museum and Learning Center
