= Willie Randolph =

American baseball player and coach (born 1954)

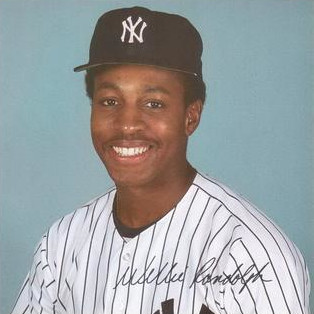
- Randolph with the New York Yankees in 1984
- Second baseman / Manager
- Born: July 6, 1954 (age 72); Holly Hill, South Carolina, U.S.
- Batted: Right Threw: Right

MLB debut
- July 29, 1975, for the Pittsburgh Pirates

Last MLB appearance
- October 4, 1992, for the New York Mets

MLB statistics
- Batting average: .276
- Hits: 2,210
- Home runs: 54
- Runs batted in: 687
- Managerial record: 302–253
- Winning %: .544
- Stats at Baseball Reference
- Managerial record at Baseball Reference

Teams
- As player: Pittsburgh Pirates (1975); New York Yankees (1976–1988); Los Angeles Dodgers (1989–1990); Oakland Athletics (1990); Milwaukee Brewers (1991); New York Mets (1992); As manager: New York Mets (2005–2008); As coach: New York Yankees (1994–2004); Milwaukee Brewers (2009–2010); Baltimore Orioles (2011)

Career highlights and awards
- 6× All-Star (1976, 1977, 1980, 1981, 1987, 1989); 5× World Series champion (1977, 1996, 1998–2000); Silver Slugger Award (1980); Monument Park honoree
Medals
Men's baseball
Representing United States
World Baseball Classic
Gold medal – first place	2017 Los Angeles	Team

William Larry Randolph (born July 6, 1954) is an American former professional baseball second baseman, coach, and manager. During an 18-year career in Major League Baseball (MLB), he played from 1975 to 1992 for six different teams, most notably the New York Yankees with whom he won back-to-back world titles against the Los Angeles Dodgers. He has joined ESPN as a post-season baseball analyst, beginning in September 2013. Mainly, he appeared on Baseball Tonight and provided updates during Monday and Wednesday night September network telecasts.

At the end of his playing career, he ranked fifth in major league history in games at second base (2,152), ninth in putouts (4,859), seventh in assists (6,336), eighth in total chances (11,429), and third in double plays (1,547). Upon retiring as a player, he joined the Yankees as a coach for 11 years. He later served as manager of the New York Mets from 2005 to June 2008, leading the Mets to a league-best record and the National League Championship Series in 2006.

== Playing career ==
Randolph grew up in Brooklyn, New York, and graduated from Samuel J. Tilden High School, where he was a star athlete and was drafted by the Pittsburgh Pirates in the 7th round of the 1972 draft. He made his major league debut in 1975, and was, at age 21, the sixth-youngest player in the National League.

He was traded with Dock Ellis and Ken Brett from the Pirates to the Yankees for Doc Medich on December 11, 1975.

Randolph spent 13 of his 18 seasons as a player with the Yankees and was co-captain of the Yankees with Ron Guidry from 1986 to 1988. He later played for the Los Angeles Dodgers (1989–90), Oakland Athletics (1990), and Milwaukee Brewers (1991), finishing his career with the New York Mets in 1992. He was selected to six All-Star teams over his career. As a career number 2 hitter in the order, he made use of his skills as bunter and a patient hitter who drew more than 80 walks seven times.

Randolph was also an outstanding defensive player, known especially for his ability to turn the double play. However, he never received the Gold Glove Award, which was perennially awarded to his equally sure-handed and more acrobatic and wide-ranging contemporaries: Frank White of the Kansas City Royals and Lou Whitaker of the Detroit Tigers. He was the Yankees' starting second baseman on the 1977 and 1978 World Series Championship teams (though he did not play in the 1978 series due to injury).

In 1980 Randolph led the league in walks (119) and was second in the AL in on-base percentage (.427), eighth in stolen bases (30) and ninth in runs (99), and won the Silver Slugger Award at second base in the AL. He also batted .332 leading off the inning, and .340 with men in scoring position.

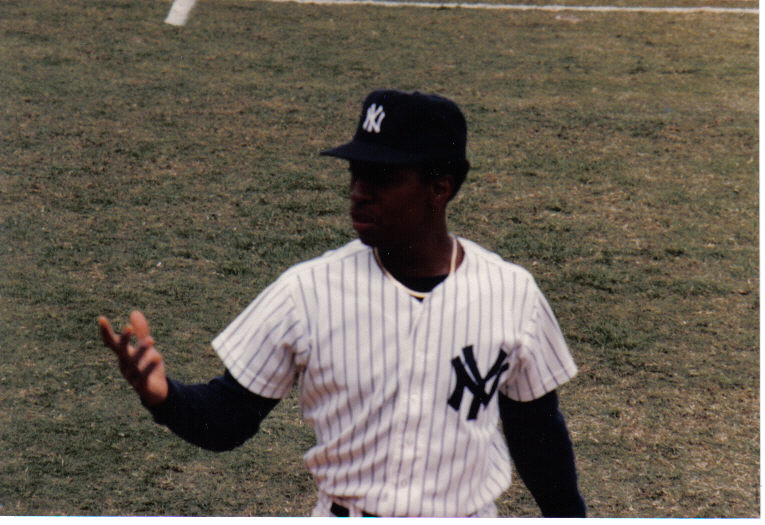
Randolph with the Yankees in 1983

Randolph was involved in a controversial play during Game 2 of the 1980 American League Championship Series. He was on second base in the top of the eighth with two outs and the Yankees down by a run. Bob Watson hit a ball to the left field corner of Royals Stadium. Though the ball bounced to Willie Wilson, third base coach Mike Ferraro waved Randolph home. Wilson overthrew U L Washington, the cut-off man, but George Brett was in position behind him to catch the ball, then throw to Darrell Porter, who tagged out Randolph in a slide. TV cameras captured a furious George Steinbrenner fuming, hollering and swearing immediately after the play resulting in him being restrained by police when he tried to gain access to the field. The Yankees lost the game 3–2, then lost the series in three games.

In 1987 he batted .305 with a career-high 67 RBIs and led the league in at bats per strikeout (18.0), and was fourth in the AL in OBP (.411) and ninth in walks (82). He also batted .366 in tie games, and .345 in games that were late and close.

In December 1988 he signed as a free agent with the Los Angeles Dodgers. Randolph led the Dodgers in batting average and hits in 1989, making his sixth All-Star team. In May 1990 he was traded by the Dodgers to the defending-world champion Oakland Athletics for Stan Javier. Later that year, Randolph and the A's won the American League pennant, but were swept by the NL-champion Cincinnati Reds in the World Series.

In April 1991 he signed as a free agent with the Milwaukee Brewers. That year, Randolph was second in the AL on-base percentage (.424) and third in batting average (.327). He batted .373 with runners in scoring position.

In December 1991 he signed as a free agent with the New York Mets. In 1992, at 37 years old he was the eighth-oldest player in the NL. In his last career game with the Mets, the team's second baseman of the future Jeff Kent moved to make his start at shortstop to allow Randolph to play his final game at second base.

Tommy John, Randolph's teammate with the Yankees, called him the "stabilizing influence" and "the club's quiet leader". "You couldn't believe how good Willie was until you were on the same team and saw him play every day," John said.

== Coaching and managing career ==
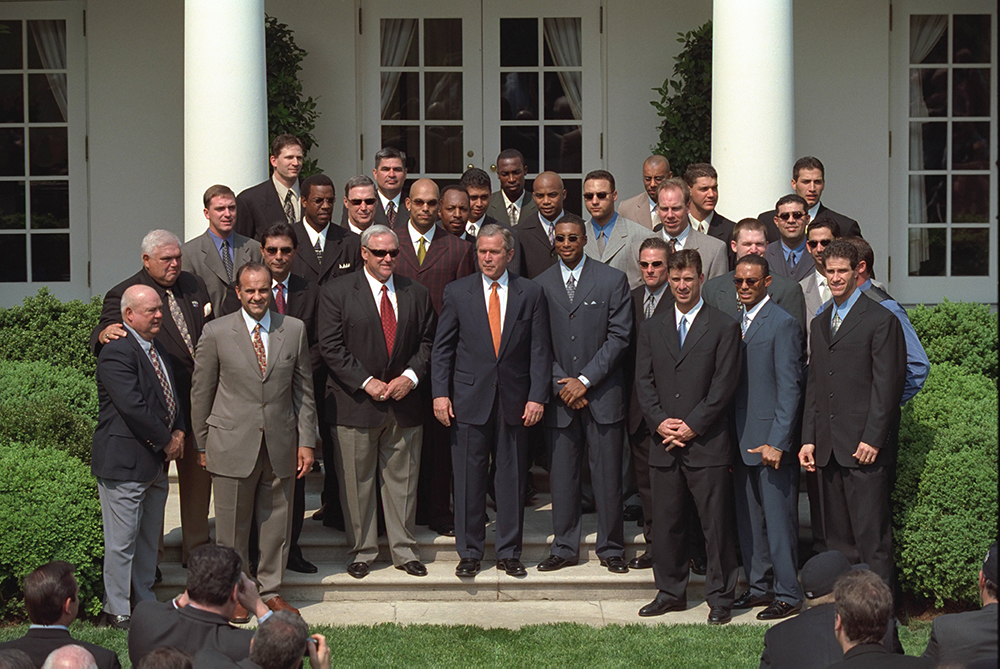
Randolf (center left) with President George W. Bush at the White House during a Yankees 2000 World Series celebration ceremony in the Rose Garden on May 4, 2001

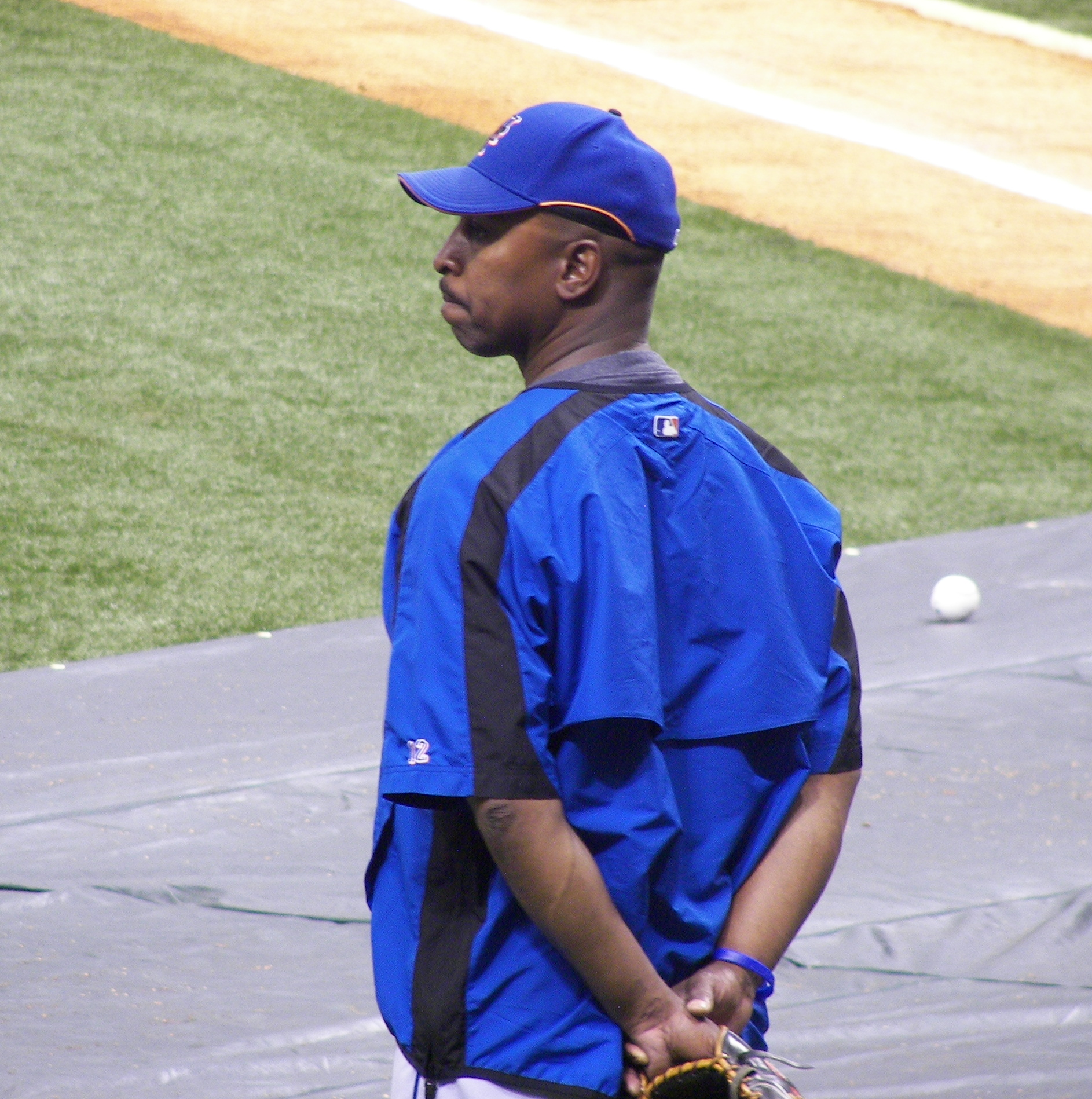
Randolph with the Mets in 2007

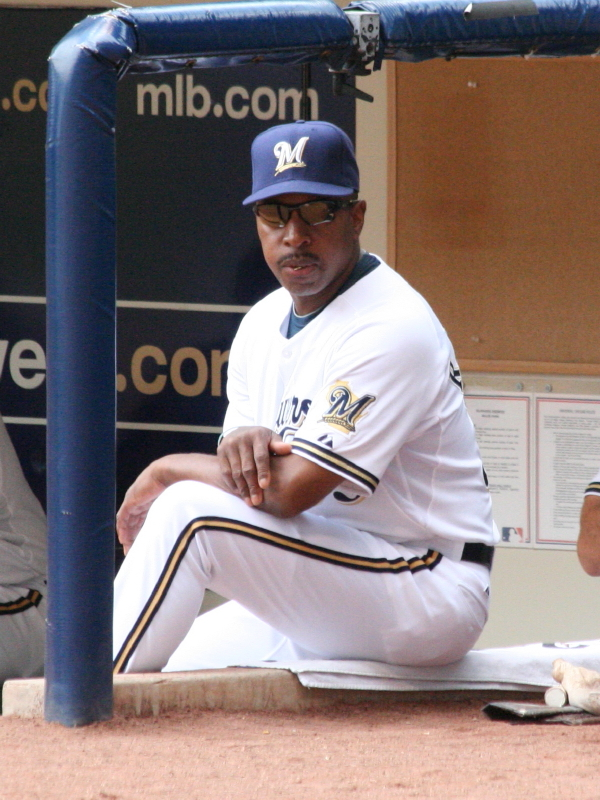
Randolph as the bench coach with the Brewers in 2009

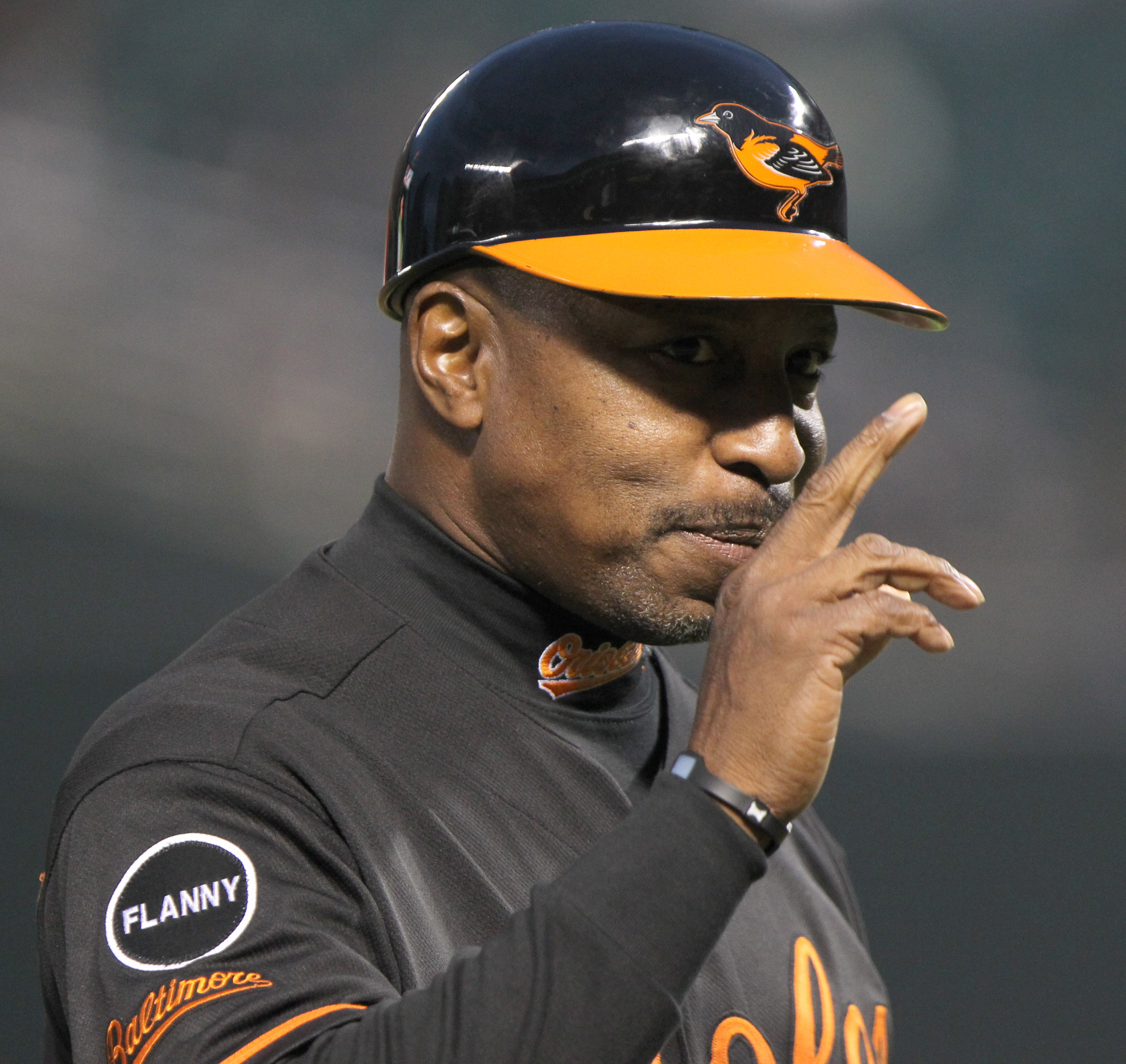
Randolph as the bench coach with the Orioles in 2011

Randolph was a Yankees base and bench coach for 11 seasons, interviewing intermittently for managing jobs with other teams. In 2004, Randolph was named Mets manager for the 2005 season. He became the eighth person to play for and later manage the Mets joining Gil Hodges, Yogi Berra, Joe Torre, Bud Harrelson, Roy McMillan, Dallas Green, and Bobby Valentine (as well as interim manager Mike Cubbage). The win halted a five-game losing streak to start the 2005 season. He then guided the Mets to five straight additional victories, giving the Mets their first six-game winning streak since August 2003.

Randolph ended his first season as manager of the 2005 Mets with an 83–79 record, the first time the franchise had finished above .500 since 2001, and 12 games better than the prior season. That record got them a tie for third place in the National League East.

In 2006, Randolph managed the Mets to a league-best 97–65 record (which also tied for the best record in the majors with the crosstown Yankees) and the NL East Division title (the team's first division championship since 1988). The Mets came within one game of reaching the World Series, losing the seventh game of the NL Championship Series to the eventual world champion St. Louis Cardinals. Randolph was the first manager in major league history to have his team's record improve by at least 12 games in each of his first two seasons (excluding seasons following strike-shortened seasons). He came in second place in the 2006 NL Manager of the Year voting, losing to Florida Marlins manager Joe Girardi. On January 24, 2007, Randolph signed a three-year, $5.65 million contract extension with the Mets. He had a club option for 2010 worth an additional $2.5 million.

In 2007, Randolph was managing the Mets when they had one of the worst collapses in major league history. Holding a seven-game first-place lead in the NL East with only 17 games to play, the Mets finished 5–12 and lost the division to the Philadelphia Phillies, who went 13–4 in the same timespan.

In 2008, Randolph's job security steadily decreased after a disappointing start to the season and inconsistent performance through mid-June. On June 17, 2008, less than two hours after the Mets' 9–6 road victory over the Los Angeles Angels of Anaheim, Randolph was fired, along with pitching coach Rick Peterson and first base coach Tom Nieto. He and his coaches were replaced by interim manager Jerry Manuel and coaches Ken Oberkfell, Dan Warthen, and Luis Aguayo. The team's record at the time of the firing was 34–35, which was 6½ games behind the Phillies in the National League East. After 2008, the Mets did not have another winning season until 2015.

After the 2008 season, Randolph was interviewed by the Milwaukee Brewers for their managerial position. Although he was one of the three finalists, the job went to Ken Macha, and Randolph was given the bench coach position, which he held until November 2010. According to Brewers GM Doug Melvin, Randolph was asked to be Macha's bench coach because Randolph had experience managing against National League teams, versus Macha's American League experience.

On November 23, 2010, Randolph was named as the final piece to Buck Showalter's coaching staff for the 2011 Baltimore Orioles. Randolph assumed the position of bench coach replacing Jeff Datz. In June 2011, Randolph switched places with John Russell, becoming Baltimore's third-base coach. Randolph and the Orioles parted ways after the 2011 season.

On November 26, 2012, it was announced Randolph would be the third base coach in the World Baseball Classic for Team USA.

On February 16, 2015, the Yankees announced that they would honor Randolph with a plaque in Monument Park on June 20, 2015.

On October 21, 2015, Randolph was named as the manager of Team USA for the inaugural 2015 WBSC Premier12.

In August 2019, he became a United States national baseball team coach for the 2019 WBSC Premier12 tournament. The team finished fourth in the tournament, and failed to qualify for the 2020 Olympics as it finished behind Mexico, but will have another opportunity to qualify.

=== Managerial record ===
As of games played on October 7, 2008.

Team	From	To	Regular season record			Post–season record		
Team	From	To	W	L	Win %	W	L	Win %
New York Mets	2005	2008	302	253	.544	6	4	.600
Total			302	253	.544	6	4	.600

== Personal life ==
As of 2008, Randolph resided in Franklin Lakes, New Jersey with his wife Gretchen. He has four children named Taniesha, Chantre, Andre, and Ciara. Tommy John has called him "a devoted family man, a man interested in the community."

Randolph delivered the commencement address to Fordham University's 2007 graduating class, of which his daughter Ciara was a member. That same day, he managed the second game in a three-game series against the Yankees.

== See also ==
- List of Major League Baseball career hits leaders
- List of Major League Baseball career runs scored leaders
- List of Major League Baseball career stolen bases leaders

Sporting positions
Preceded by Graig Nettles	New York Yankees team captain (with Ron Guidry until July 12, 1989); March 4, 1986 to October 2, 1989	Succeeded by Don Mattingly
Preceded by Clete Boyer	New York Yankees third base coach	Succeeded by Luis Sojo
Preceded by Don Zimmer	New York Yankees bench coach 2004	Succeeded by Joe Girardi
Preceded by Robin Yount	Milwaukee Brewers bench coach 2009–2010	Succeeded by Jerry Narron
