= Ron Guidry =

American baseball player and coach (born 1950)

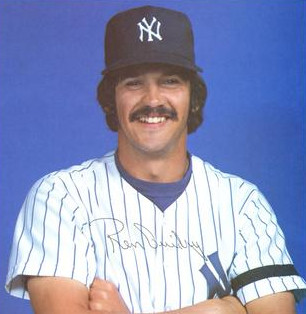
- Guidry in 1981
- Pitcher
- Born: August 28, 1950 (age 76); Lafayette, Louisiana, U.S.
- Batted: Left Threw: Left

MLB debut
- July 27, 1975, for the New York Yankees

Last MLB appearance
- September 27, 1988, for the New York Yankees

MLB statistics
- Win–loss record: 170–91
- Earned run average: 3.29
- Strikeouts: 1,778
- Stats at Baseball Reference

Teams
- As player: New York Yankees (1975–1988); As coach: New York Yankees (2006–2007)

Career highlights and awards
- 4× All-Star (1978, 1979, 1982, 1983); 2× World Series champion (1977, 1978); AL Cy Young Award (1978); 5× Gold Glove Award (1982–1986); Roberto Clemente Award (1984); 2× AL wins leader (1978, 1985); 2× AL ERA leader (1978, 1979); New York Yankees No. 49 retired; Monument Park honoree

Ronald Ames Guidry (/ˈɡɪdri/; born August 28, 1950), nicknamed "Louisiana Lightning" and "Gator", is an American former professional baseball pitcher who played 14 seasons in Major League Baseball (MLB) for the New York Yankees. Guidry was also the pitching coach of the Yankees from 2006 to 2007.

Guidry's major league career began in 1975. He was a member of World Series-winning Yankees teams in 1977 and 1978, both over the Los Angeles Dodgers. He won the American League Cy Young Award in 1978, winning 25 games and losing only 3. He also won five Gold Glove Awards and appeared in four All-Star games. Guidry served as captain of the Yankees beginning in 1986; he retired from baseball in 1989. In 2003, the Yankees retired Guidry's uniform number (49) and dedicated a plaque to him in Monument Park.

== Early life ==
Guidry was born on August 28, 1950, in Lafayette, Louisiana, to Roland and Mary Grace Guidry. Guidry is of Cajun heritage.

== College career ==
Guidry attended and pitched for the University of Southwestern Louisiana. He was a combined 12–5 with a 2.03 earned run average (ERA) and 137 strikeouts as a two-year letterman with the Ragin' Cajuns baseball team in 1969 and 1970.

== Professional career ==
=== Draft and minor leagues ===
The New York Yankees of Major League Baseball (MLB) selected Guidry in the third round, with the 67th overall pick, in the 1971 MLB draft.

=== New York Yankees (1975–1988) ===
After four seasons in the minor leagues with the Cardinals in Johnson City, Tennessee, Guidry pitched briefly in the Major Leagues in the 1975 and 1976 seasons. He was nearly sent to the Baltimore Orioles as part of a trade deadline blockbuster on June 15, 1976, but the Yankees did not want to give up any more left-handed pitchers beyond the three (Scott McGregor, Tippy Martinez and Rudy May) that they had already included in the deal. The following year he was to have been dealt to Toronto for Bill Singer in a transaction that was approved by the Yankees but was vetoed by Blue Jays president Peter Bavasi.

In 1977, Guidry began the season as a relief pitcher but was moved into the Yankees' starting rotation. On April 30, he was called on to make an emergency start in replace of Mike Torrez, recently acquired in a trade from the Athletics, who had not joined the team in time for what was supposed to be his first start. In the longest outing Guidry could remember since his Eastern League days of 1974, he helped the Yankees beat the Seattle Mariners 3–0. Guidry finished the season with a 16–7 record. His emergence as a starter after his previous seasons in the bullpen made him one of the Yankees' biggest surprises in 1977. He helped lead the Yankees to a World Series championship.

In 1978, Guidry posted a career year that has been described as the all-time best season by a Yankees pitcher. Against the California Angels on June 17, he struck out a Yankee-record 18 batters. This is the game that Anthony Losco started what is known today as the two-strike clap. Guidry's 18-strikeout performance is usually cited as the launching pad of the Yankee Stadium tradition of fans standing and clapping for a strikeout with two strikes on the opposing batter. For the season, Guidry went 25–3, setting the all-time mark for winning percentage by a pitcher with at least twenty wins. He led the league with a 1.74 ERA, an .893 winning percentage, nine shutouts, and 248 strikeouts. Guidry's success in 1978 was due in large part to his mastery of the slider. His 248 strikeouts set a Yankees' franchise record for most strikeouts by a pitcher in a single season, breaking Jack Chesbro's 1904 record of 239, that subsequently stood for 44 years, until 2022 when Gerrit Cole recorded 257 strikeouts.

Guidry's 25th win of the 1978 regular season was his most significant, as it came in the Yankees' 5–4 win over the Boston Red Sox in a one-game playoff at Fenway Park in Boston to determine the American League East division winner. The game is best known for Bucky Dent's seventh-inning, three-run home run that gave the Yankees a 3–2 lead. Later that month, the Yankees again won the World Series over the Los Angeles Dodgers. Guidry won the 1978 American League Cy Young Award unanimously. He also finished second in the American League Most Valuable Player voting to Boston Red Sox slugger Jim Rice. In addition, Guidry was named The Sporting News Sportsman, AL Pitcher, and Major League Player of the Year. He was also named the Associated Press Athlete of the Year. Had he not taken the loss in Toronto on September 20, when his record at the time was 22–2, he would have become the first (and to date, only), pitcher ever with at least a .900 winning percentage, and at least 20 wins in a season.

Guidry was named to the American League All-Star Team in 1978, 1979, 1982, and 1983. Known as an excellent fielder, Guidry won a Gold Glove each year from 1982 through 1986. In 1984, Guidry won the Roberto Clemente Award, given annually to the Major Leaguer who "'best exemplifies the game of baseball, sportsmanship, community involvement and the individual’s contribution to his team.'"

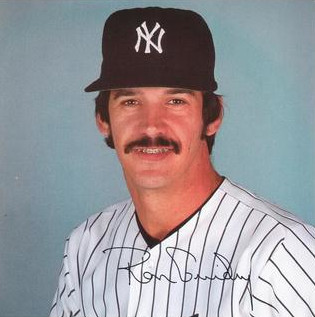
Guidry circa 1984

On August 7, 1984, Guidry struck out three batters (Carlton Fisk, Tom Paciorek and Greg Luzinski) on nine pitches in the ninth inning of a 7–0 win over the Chicago White Sox. Guidry became the eighth American League pitcher and the 27th pitcher in major-league history to accomplish an immaculate inning. In 1985, he led the American League with 22 wins. Guidry and Willie Randolph were named co-captains of the Yankees on March 4, 1986.

The latter years of Guidry's 14-year major league career were hindered by shoulder and elbow injuries. He retired from baseball on July 12, 1989.

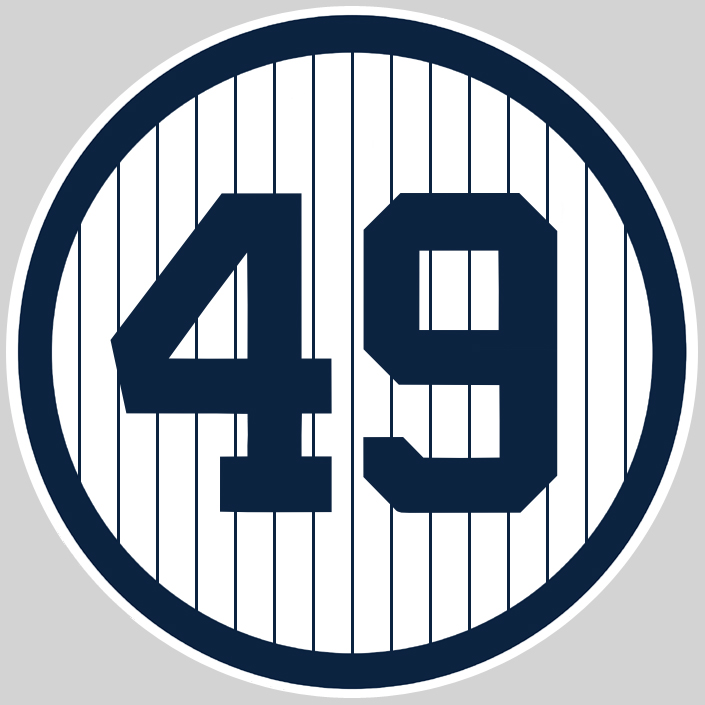
Ron Guidry's number 49 was retired by the New York Yankees in 2003.

Guidry's number 49 was retired on August 23, 2003. The Yankees also dedicated a plaque to Guidry in Monument Park at Yankee Stadium. The plaque calls Guidry "a dominating pitcher", a "respected leader", and "a true Yankee." Each living Yankee previously honored with a plaque in Monument Park was on hand for the ceremony: Phil Rizzuto, Yogi Berra, Whitey Ford, Reggie Jackson and Don Mattingly.

== Coaching career ==
=== New York Yankees (2006–2007) ===
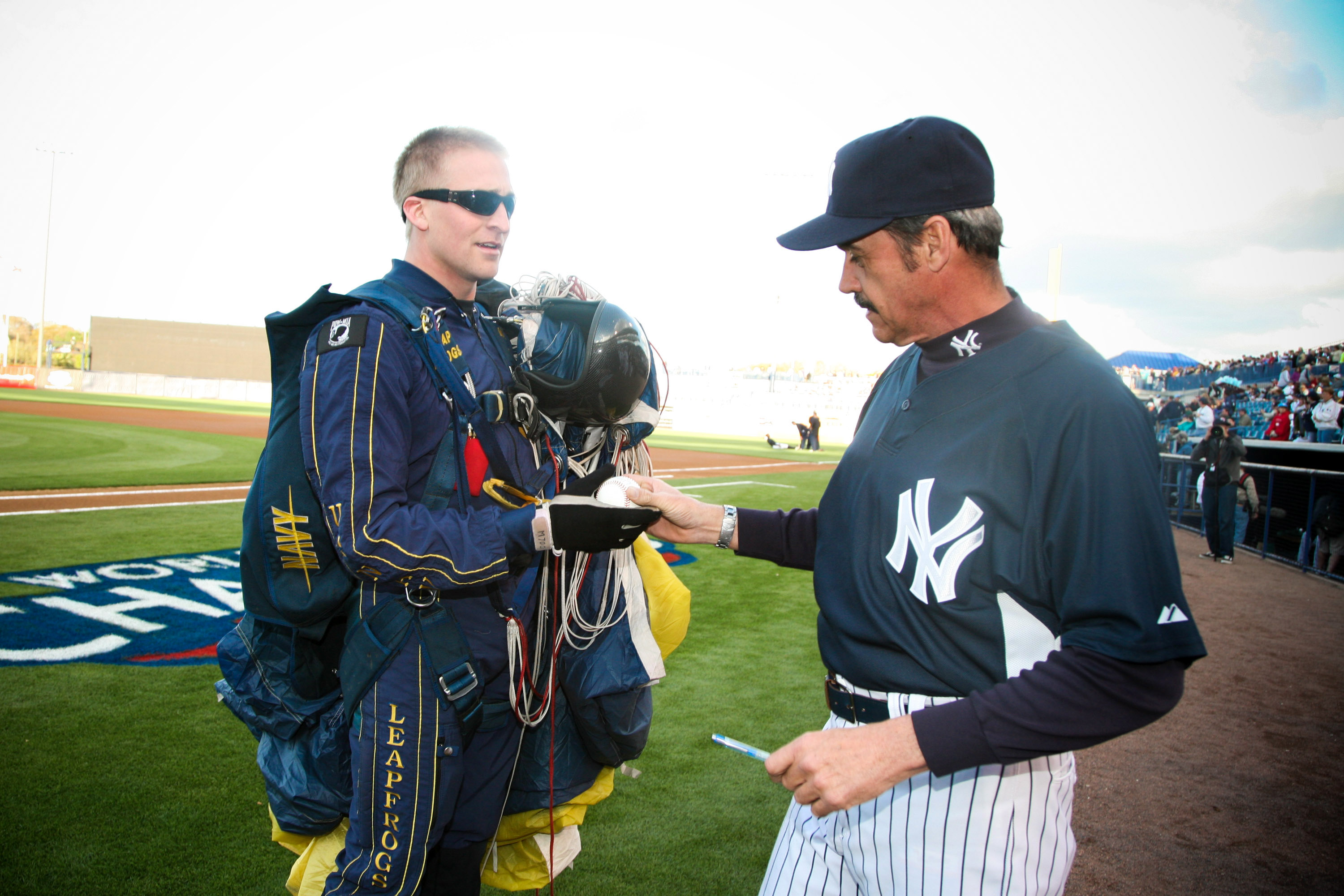
Guidry during spring training in 2010

Guidry joined Yankees manager Joe Torre's coaching staff as pitching coach in the 2006 season, replacing Mel Stottlemyre. Guidry was criticized in 2007 because the Yankees' highly acclaimed pitching staff was underachieving. In 2007, Yankees pitchers walked the sixth-most batters overall in the Major Leagues; this was the most walks in a season for a Yankees pitching staff since 2000. Torre's departure from the Yankees following the 2007 season ended Guidry's tenure as pitching coach. Though he was interested in returning to the Yankees for the 2008 season, he was not offered a position on new manager Joe Girardi's coaching staff. He has returned to the Yankees as a spring training instructor.

Former New York Times writer Harvey Araton wrote a book called Driving Mr. Yogi: Yogi Berra, Ron Guidry, and Baseball's Greatest Gift that profiles the friendship Guidry had with Yankees' Hall of Fame catcher (and Guidry's former coach and manager) Yogi Berra.

== Personal life ==
Guidry and his wife married on September 23, 1972. They have three children.

Guidry is a member of the Knights of Columbus.

== See also ==
- List of Major League Baseball annual ERA leaders
- List of Major League Baseball annual wins leaders
- List of Major League Baseball single-game strikeout leaders
- List of Major League Baseball players who spent their entire career with one franchise

== Sources ==
| Preceded by Mel Stottlemyre | New York Yankees pitching coach 2006–2007 | Succeeded by Dave Eiland |
