= Visions Federal Credit Union =

Credit union in Endwell, New York

- Type: Credit union
- Industry: Financial services
- Founded: May 6, 1965; 61 years ago
- Headquarters: Endwell, New York, United States
- Number of locations: 60
- Key people: Tyrone Muse (President & CEO); Christopher H. Marion (Chairman)
- Products: Checking; consumer loans; mortgages; credit cards; investments; online banking; certificates of deposit (CDs); money marketing account;
- Total assets: $5.226 Billion USD (December 2025)
- Members: 251,872 (January 2026)
- Website: www.visionsfcu.org

Visions Federal Credit Union (or Visions FCU) is a federally chartered credit union headquartered in Endwell, New York, chartered and regulated under the authority of the National Credit Union Administration (NCUA). As of the last quarter of 2025, it reported 251,872 members, total assets of $5.286 billion, 60 branches, and over 900 employees.

== History ==
Visions FCU was originally chartered on 6 May 1966 as the IBM Endicott Employees Federal Credit Union. Only employees of the Endicott, New York IBM plant and their families were eligible to join. On 30 January 1981, it merged with the IBM Owego Employees Federal Credit Union in Owego, New York to become the IBM Endicott\Owego Employees Federal Credit Union. By the end of the 1980s, the credit union serviced over 15,000 IBM employees.

On 1 July 1994, the credit union officially changed its name to Visions Federal Credit Union, following changes and expansions to its field of membership beyond IBM employees.

== Charitable contributions ==
Visions FCU's charitable-giving program, branded as "Visions Cares," has given a reported $15,607,012.51 to community organizations, as of April 2026. Their employees volunteer 3,000+ hours and raise over $195,000 annually.

== Community partnerships ==
In 2020, Visions FCU secured naming rights to the Broome County Veterans Memorial Arena in Binghamton, New York. Under a 10-year agreement beginning January 1, 2021, the facility was renamed the Visions Veterans Memorial Arena.

On August 13, 2026, Ithaca College and SUNY Cortland announced a four-year partnership with Visions Federal Credit Union to serve as the Presenting Sponsor of the Cortaca Jug, their annual NCAA Division III football rivalry game. It began with the 2026 game at Yankee Stadium on November 14, 2026, and continues through the 2029 game. Under the agreement, the game will be known as "Cortaca Jug presented by Visions Federal Credit Union."
