= Cortaca Jug =

American college football trophy

- Cortland Red Dragons Ithaca Bombers
- Sport: Football
- First meeting: 1930; Cortland 12, Ithaca 0
- Latest meeting: November 14, 2026; Cortland 30, Ithaca 23
- Next meeting: November 2027
- Trophy: Cortaca Jug

Statistics
- Total meetings: 84
- All-time series: Ithaca leads, 44–37–3
- Trophy series: Ithaca leads, 39–28
- Largest victory: Ithaca, 42–0 (1981)
- Longest win streak: Ithaca, 9 (1973–1981)
- Current win streak: Cortland, 1 (2026–present)
- Locations in New York

Locations of Ithaca College and SUNY Cortland

The Cortaca Jug is the trophy given to the annual college football game played between the Red Dragons of the State University of New York College at Cortland and the Bombers of Ithaca College. The match-up is one of the most prominent in NCAA Division III football. The Cortaca game typically sells out, with thousands of fans packed into the stadium.

In 2019, the game set a Division III attendance record when it was held at MetLife Stadium. The 2022 matchup was played at Yankee Stadium and was the second all-time attendance record of Division III football.

== History of the game ==
The name is a portmanteau of the names of the two schools, the "cort" coming from SUNY Cortland and the "aca" part coming from Ithaca College. The schools are located 21 miles apart in the eastern end of the Finger Lakes region of New York. The schools have rich football histories. Ithaca has won three national NCAA Division III Football Championships and Cortland has one national championship and 15 bowl game appearances since 1988.

The night before the Jug, it is customary for the staff of Cortland's radio station WSUC to play the staff of Ithaca's radio station 92 WICB in a game called "The Cortaca Mic" which takes place at Cortland.

Since 2006, Ithaca College students and alumni residing in Los Angeles have gathered to watch the game in an event dubbed CortaCal. The event originally began in an apartment in Sherman Oaks, California. It was held from 2008 to 2010 at The Casting Office in Studio City, California, and since 2011 has been held at its current home, 33 Taps (formerly Dillon's Irish Pub) in Hollywood, California. Between 300 and 400 Ithaca College alumni attend every year.

Ithaca College alumni in New York City have begun watching the game at their own annual event, NYCortaca. The event was started in 2009 by Ithaca alumni living in NYC and was first held at George Keeley Pub on the Upper West Side. In 2010, it was held at Berry Park in Williamsburg, Brooklyn, and in 2011 it took place at Irving Plaza in Union Square. NYCortaca 2012 was held at Brooklyn Bowl in Williamsburg, and in 2013 NYCortaca returned to Irving Plaza. NYCortaca 2013 was attended by over 800 Cortaca fans and was the biggest off-campus alumni gathering in Ithaca College history.

More localized Cortland and Ithaca graduates come together to attend the game, or showings of it at the Lynne Parks Hoffmann Alumni House, in Cortland, NY. Examples include an annual gathering from Slabtown, NY.

In 2019, the game was held at MetLife Stadium in the New York City area, as part of commemorations of the 150th anniversary of college football. The game had an attendance of 45,161, the highest in NCAA Division III history.

On November 12, 2022 and November 14, 2026, the game was played at Yankee Stadium in The Bronx.

In the leadup to the 2025 Cortaca Jug Game, it was announced that the 2026 edition would once again take place at Yankee Stadium on November 14, 2026.

On August 13, 2026, SUNY Cortland and Ithaca College announced a four-year partnership with Visions Federal Credit Union. The partnership is the first naming sponsorship in the Cortaca Jug’s history, beginning with the 2026 season, including the game at Yankee Stadium on November 14, 2026, and continues through the 2029 game.

Under the agreement, the game will be known as “Cortaca Jug presented by Visions Federal Credit Union.” A co-branded logo will be developed for each year of the partnership.

== History of the trophy ==
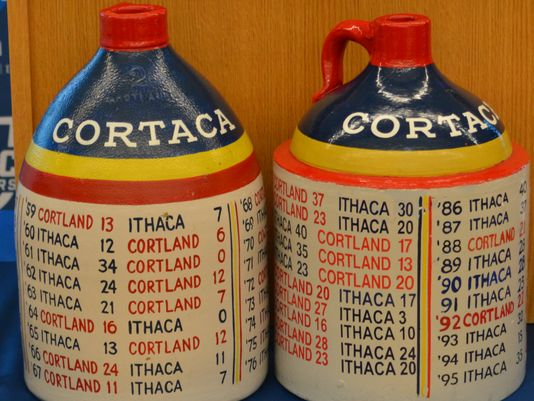
The original Cortaca Jug trophy (left) along with the new trophy (right).

The Cortaca Jug was introduced to the already competitive rivalry in 1959 by the captains of the two teams. While driving in nearby Homer in 1959, Cortland football captain Tom Decker stopped at a yard sale and purchased a $2 jug from a local farmer, named Freddy Testa, that he thought could be used as a trophy during the annual game between the two teams. After meeting up with friend and Ithaca football captain Dick Carmean, the two painted the jug blue, gold, red, and white in honor of both schools’ colors. The first Jug ran out of room for scores in the mid-1980s, necessitating a second Jug that sports the most recent results. After 2015, Jug II was also full.

== 2013 riot ==
The Cortaca Jug is usually associated with an assortment of pre- and post-game parties and drinking. Following their 2013 win, SUNY Cortland revelers rioted on the streets of Cortland, throwing beer and other items, flipping cars, and committing other destructive acts that resulted in the arrests of around 30 people. New York State police assisted the crowd control, and a "command post" was set up at the local fire station. SUNY Cortland President Erik J. Bitterbaum issued a formal apology for the students' behavior.

In 2014, Students in SUNY Cortland's Student Government Association started a campaign to "Take Cortaca Back", partnering with Mayor Brian Tobin and local authorities to change the outlook on the college after the riot. Their campaign centered around community service initiatives before and after the game.

== Game results ==
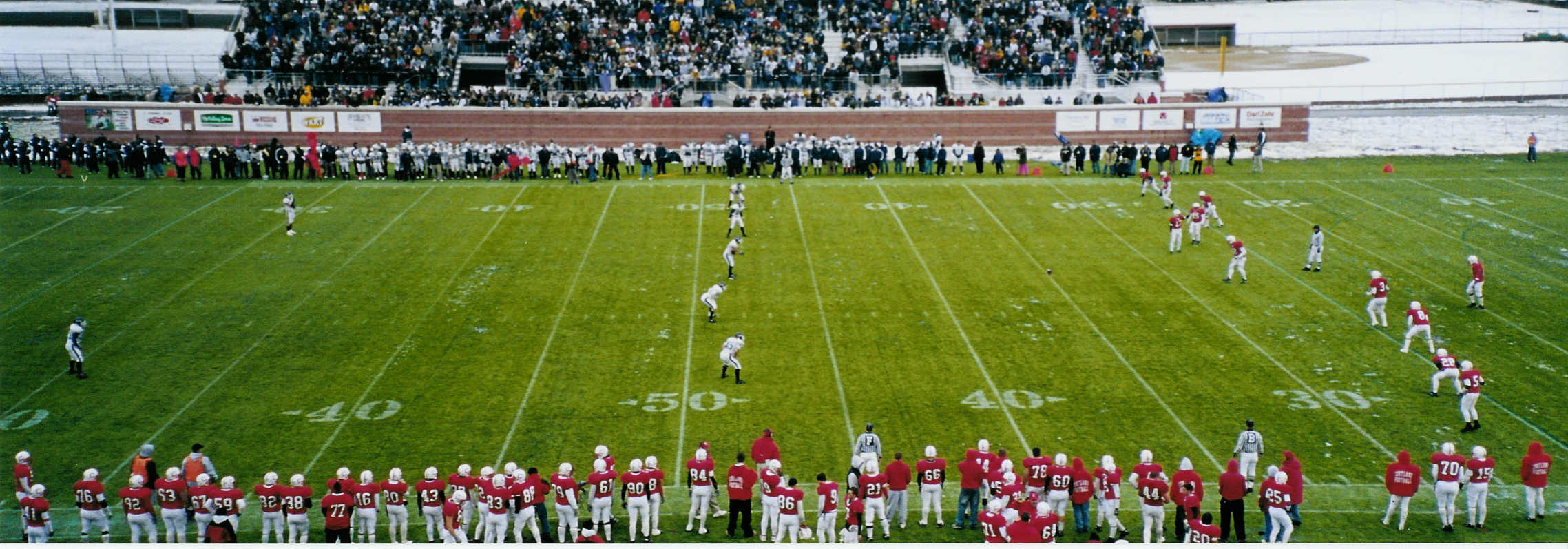
2002 Cortaca Jug, the first at the new Cortland Athletic Complex – image courtesy of Jamie Malarkey

Ithaca leads the overall series 44–37–3 and the Cortaca Jug series 39–28.

Cortland victories	Ithaca victories	Tie games

No.	Date	Location	Winner	Score
1	1930	Cortland	Cortland	12–0
2	1931	Ithaca	Ithaca	12–6
3	1932	Ithaca	Tie	0–0
4	1933	Cortland	Tie	6–6
5	1934	Ithaca	Ithaca	7–0
6	1948	Cortland	Cortland	19–0
7	1949	Ithaca	Cortland	32–7
8	1950	Cortland	Ithaca	7–6
9	1951	Ithaca	Ithaca	13–6
10	1952	Cortland	Cortland	39–6
11	1953	Ithaca	Cortland	32–0
12	1954	Cortland	Tie	13–13
13	1955	Ithaca	Cortland	28–0
14	1956	Cortland	Cortland	37–0
15	1957	Ithaca	Cortland	32–13
16	1958	Cortland	Cortland	16–6
17	1959	Ithaca	Cortland	13–7
18	1960	Cortland	Ithaca	12–6
19	1961	Ithaca	Ithaca	34–0
20	1962	Cortland	Ithaca	24–12
21	1963	Ithaca	Ithaca	22–7
22	1964	Cortland	Cortland	16–0
23	1965	Ithaca	Ithaca	13–12
24	1966	Cortland	Cortland	24–11
25	1967	Ithaca	Cortland	11–7
26	1968	Cortland	Cortland	34–13
27	1969	Ithaca	Ithaca	36–28
28	1970	Cortland	Cortland	7–0
29	1971	Ithaca	Ithaca	21–13
30	1972	Cortland	Cortland	21–16
31	1973	Ithaca	Ithaca	41–33
32	1974	Cortland	Ithaca	34–33
33	1975	Ithaca	Ithaca	21–6
34	1976	Cortland	Ithaca	28–12
35	1977	Ithaca	Ithaca	38–17
36	1978	Cortland	Ithaca	27–13
37	1979	Ithaca	Ithaca	42–7
38	1980	Cortland	Ithaca	24–7
39	1981	Ithaca	Ithaca	42–0
40	1982	Cortland	Cortland	21–17
41	1983	Ithaca	Ithaca	49–26
42	1984	Cortland	Ithaca	42–6
43	1985	Ithaca	Ithaca	41–0

No.	Date	Location	Winner	Score
44	1986	Cortland	Ithaca	40–12
45	1987	Ithaca	Ithaca	37–15
46	1988	Cortland	Cortland	21–20
47	1988^{#}	Ithaca	Ithaca	24–17
48	1989	Ithaca	Ithaca	28–0
49	1990	Cortland	Ithaca	28–14
50	1991	Ithaca	Ithaca	23–14
51	1992	Cortland	Cortland	22–20
52	1993	Ithaca	Ithaca	32–14
53	1994	Cortland	Ithaca	15–13
54	1995	Ithaca	Ithaca	35–19
55	1996	Cortland	Cortland	41–13
56	1997	Ithaca	Cortland	33–28
57	1998	Cortland	Ithaca	37–29
58	1999	Ithaca	Cortland	26–21
59	2000	Cortland	Ithaca	19–14
60	2001	Ithaca	Ithaca	21–14
61	2002	Cortland	Cortland	16–12
62	2003	Ithaca	Cortland	16–15
63	2004	Cortland	Ithaca	47–22
64	2005	Ithaca	Cortland	37–30^{OT}
65	2006	Cortland	Cortland	23–20^{OT}
66	2007	Ithaca	Ithaca	40–17
67	2008	Cortland	Ithaca	35–13
68	2009	Ithaca	Ithaca	23–20
69	2010	Cortland	Cortland	20–17
70	2011	Ithaca	Cortland	27–3
71	2012	Cortland	Cortland	16–10
72	2013	Ithaca	Cortland	28–24
73	2014	Cortland	Cortland	23–20
74	2015	Ithaca	Cortland	11–8
75	2016	Cortland	Cortland	28–16
76	2017	Ithaca	Ithaca	48–20
77	2018	Cortland	Ithaca	24–21
78	2019	East Rutherford	Ithaca	32–20
79	2021	Cortland	Cortland	28–27
80	2022	The Bronx	Ithaca	34–17
81	2023	Ithaca	Cortland	38–28
82	2024	Cortland	Cortland	28–17
83	2025	Ithaca	Ithaca	26–21
84	2026	The Bronx	Cortland	30–23
Series: Ithaca leads 44–37–3

^{#}Quarterfinal playoff game. Does not count in Cortaca Jug game count.

== See also ==
- List of NCAA college football rivalry games
