= Yankee Stadium =

Baseball stadium in the Bronx, New York City

- The Stadium; The House That Jeter Built; The House That George Built

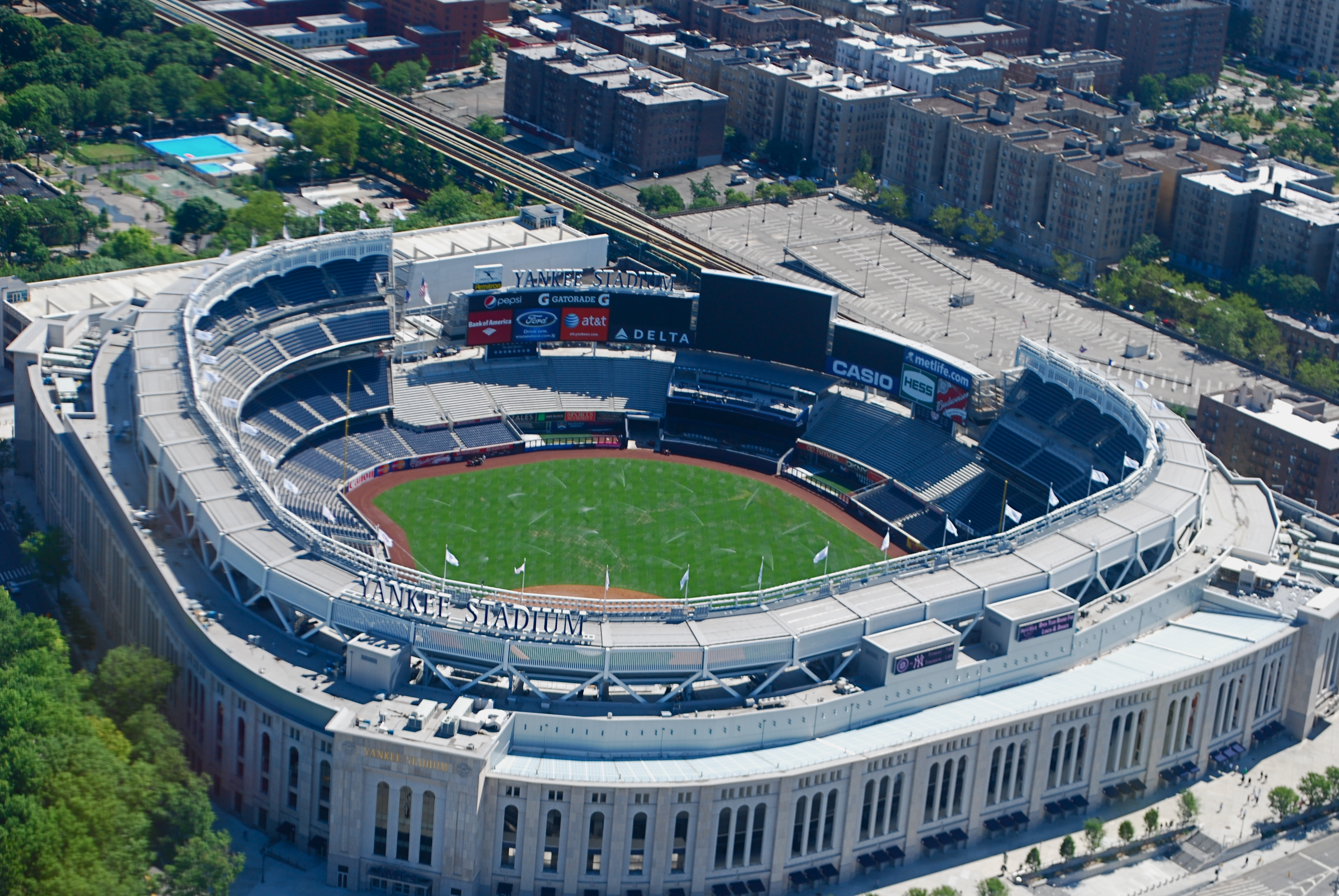
- Yankee Stadium in 2010

- Location in New York City Location in New York State Location in the United States
- Interactive map of Yankee Stadium
- Address: 1 East 161st Street
- Location: The Bronx, New York City, U.S.
- Coordinates: 40°49′45″N 73°55′35″W
- Owner: City of New York
- Operator: Yankee Stadium LLC
- Capacity: List: Baseball: 46,537 (2020–present); 47,309 (2018–2019); 47,422 (2017); 49,469 (2016); 49,638 (2015); 49,642 (2014); 50,291 (2011–2013); 50,287 (2009–2010); Soccer: 28,743 (Expandable to 47,309); Football: 54,251
- Surface: Kentucky Bluegrass
- Field size: List: Baseball: Left field – 318 ft (97 m); Left center – 399 ft (122 m); Center field – 408 ft (124 m); Right center – 385 ft (117 m); Right field – 314 ft (96 m); Backstop – 52 ft 4 in (15.95 m); Soccer: 110 yd (100 m) x 70 yd (64 m)
- Public transit: Metro-North Railroad: Hudson Line Harlem Line (game days only) New Haven Line (game days only) at Yankees – East 153rd Street; New York City Subway: at 161st Street – Yankee Stadium; New York City Bus: Bx1, Bx2, Bx6, Bx6 SBS, Bx13

Construction
- Groundbreaking: August 19, 2006
- Opened: April 2, 2009 (workout day); April 3, 2009 (exhibition game); April 16, 2009 (regular season)
- Cost: US$2.3 billion
- Architect: Populous (formerly HOK Sport)
- Project managers: Tishman Speyer/International Facilities Group, LLC.
- Structural engineer: Thornton Tomasetti
- Services engineers: M-E Engineers, Inc.
- General contractor: Turner Construction

Tenants
- New York Yankees (MLB) (2009–present); Pinstripe Bowl (NCAA) (2010–present); New York City FC (MLS) (2015–present)

Website
- mlb.com/yankees/ballpark

Yankee Stadium (also referred to as New Yankee Stadium to distinguish it from the original) is a baseball stadium located in the Bronx, New York City. It is the home field of the New York Yankees of Major League Baseball.

The stadium opened in April 2009, replacing the original Yankee Stadium that operated from 1923 to 2008; it is situated in the Concourse neighborhood of the Bronx on the 24-acre (9.7 ha) former site of Macombs Dam Park, one block north of the original stadium's site. The new Yankee Stadium replicates design elements of the original Yankee Stadium, including its exterior and trademark frieze, while incorporating larger spaces and modern amenities. It has the fifth-largest seating capacity among the 30 stadiums of Major League Baseball.

Construction on the stadium began in August 2006, and the project spanned many years and faced many controversies, including the high public cost and the loss of public park land. The $2.3 billion stadium was built with $1.2 billion in public subsidies and is one of the most expensive stadiums ever built.

Yankee Stadium hosted the 2009 and 2024 World Series. Yankee Stadium became the home field of MLS expansion team New York City FC in 2015, which is owned by City Football Group and the Yankees. It will be an interim venue for the club until Etihad Park is constructed in Willets Point and opens in 2027. It has also occasionally hosted college football games, including the annual Pinstripe Bowl, concerts, and other athletic and entertainment events.

== History ==
=== Planning ===
New York Yankees owner George Steinbrenner began campaigning for a new stadium in the early 1980s, just a few years after the remodeled Yankee Stadium opened. Steinbrenner at the time was reportedly considering a move to the Meadowlands Sports Complex in New Jersey. New Jersey governor Thomas Kean in 1984 authorized the use of land for a new baseball stadium in the Meadowlands, but the state legislature did not provide financing for the stadium. In a statewide referendum in 1987, New Jersey taxpayers rejected $185 million in public financing for a baseball stadium for the Yankees. Despite the rejection from New Jersey, Steinbrenner frequently threatened to move as leverage in negotiations with New York City.

In 1988, Mayor Ed Koch agreed to have city taxpayers spend $90 million on a second renovation of Yankee Stadium that included luxury boxes and restaurants inside the stadium and parking garages and traffic improvements outside. Steinbrenner agreed in principle, but then backed out of the deal. In 1993, Mayor David Dinkins expanded on Koch's proposal by offering his Bronx Center vision for the neighborhood, including new housing, a new courthouse, and relocating the Police Academy nearby.

In 1993, New York governor Mario Cuomo proposed using the West Side Yard, a 30-acre (12 ha) rail yard along the West Side of Manhattan and owned by the Metropolitan Transportation Authority, as the location for a new stadium for the Yankees but would unexpectedly lose to George Pataki in the 1994 New York gubernatorial election, effectively killing that proposal. By 1995, Steinbrenner had rejected 13 proposals to keep the Yankees in the Bronx.

In 1998, Bronx borough president Fernando Ferrer proposed spending $600 million in public money to add dozens of luxury boxes to the stadium, to improve highway and public transportation access, and to create a Yankee Village, with shops, restaurants, and a museum. Steinbrenner rejected this as well. That same year, Mayor Rudy Giuliani unveiled a plan to relocate the Yankees to the West Side Yard for a $1 billion stadium. However, with most of the funding coming from taxpayers, Giuliani tabled the proposal, fearing rejection in a citywide referendum. The West Side Stadium plan resurfaced in December 2001, and by January 2002, four months after the September 11 attacks, Giuliani announced "tentative agreements" for both the New York Yankees and New York Mets to build new stadiums before departing the mayor's office at the stroke of midnight on January 1, 2002. He estimated that both stadiums would cost $2 billion, with city and state taxpayers contributing $1.2 billion.

Michael Bloomberg, who succeeded Giuliani, called the former mayor's agreements "corporate welfare" and exercised the escape clause in the agreements to back out of both deals, saying that the city could not afford to build new stadiums for the Yankees and Mets. Bloomberg said that Giuliani had inserted a clause in this deal that loosened the teams' leases with the city and would allow the Yankees and Mets to leave the city on 60 days' notice to find a new home elsewhere if the city backed out of the agreement. At the time, Bloomberg said that publicly funded stadiums were a poor investment. Bloomberg's blueprint for the stadium was unveiled in 2004, at the same time as the plan for the Mets' new stadium, Citi Field. The final cost for the two stadiums was more than $3.1 billion; taxpayer subsidies accounted for $1.8 billion.

=== Construction ===
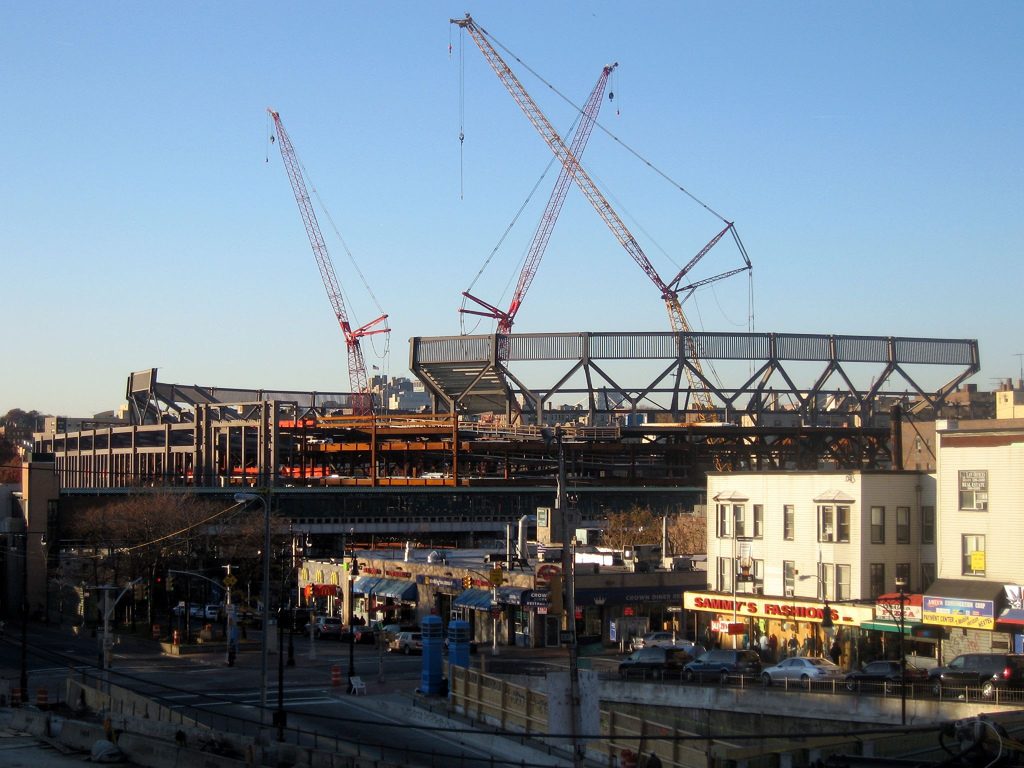
The stadium under construction in 2007

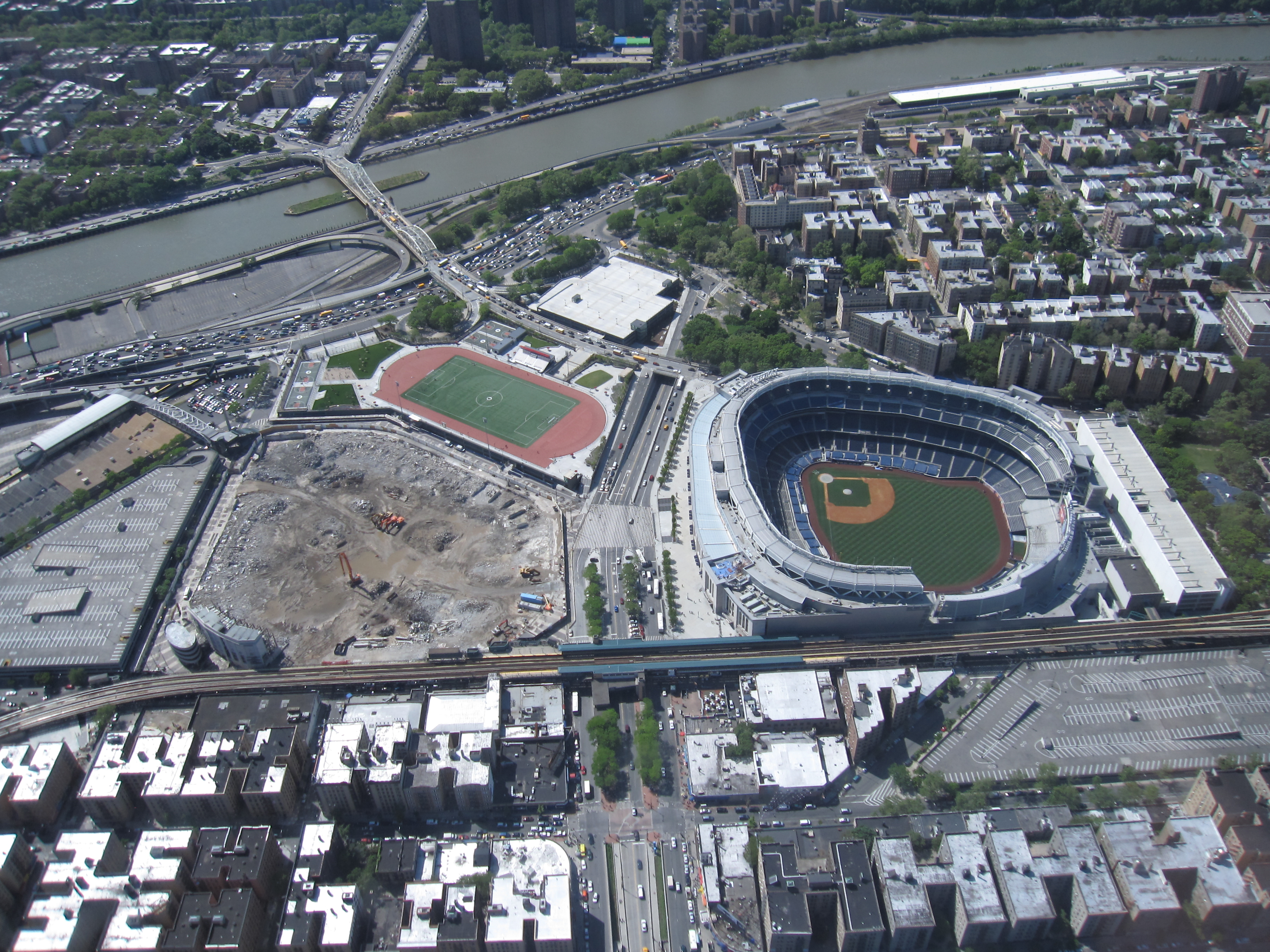
The completed venue next to the remains of the former facility in 2010

Groundbreaking ceremonies for the stadium took place on August 16, 2006, the 58th anniversary of Babe Ruth's death, with Steinbrenner, Bloomberg, and then-governor of New York George Pataki among the notables donning Yankees hard hats and wielding ceremonial shovels to mark the occasion. The Yankees continued to play in the previous Yankee Stadium during the 2007 and 2008 seasons while their new home stadium was built across the street. The community was left without parkland for five years.

During construction of the new stadium, a construction worker and avid Boston Red Sox fan buried a replica jersey of Red Sox player David Ortiz underneath the visitors' dugout with the objective of placing a "hex" on the Yankees, much like the "Curse of the Bambino" that had allegedly plagued the Red Sox long after trading Ruth to the Yankees. After the worker was exposed by co-workers, he was forced to help exhume the jersey. The Yankees organization then donated the retrieved jersey to the Jimmy Fund, a charity started in 1948 by the Red Sox' National League rivals, the Boston Braves, but long championed by the Red Sox and particularly associated with Ted Williams. The worker has since claimed to have buried a 2004 American League Championship Series program/scorecard, but has not said where he placed it. These attempts did not have much effect upon the home team, though: the Yankees went on to win the 2009 World Series at the end of their first MLB season in the new stadium, though the original Yankee Stadium was still partially standing at the time.

== Features ==
The new stadium is meant to evoke elements of the original Yankee Stadium, both in its original 1923 state and its post-renovation state in 1976. The exterior resembles the original look of the 1923 Yankee Stadium. The interior, a modern ballpark with greater space and increased amenities, features a playing field that closely mimics the 1988–2008 dimensions of the old stadium. The current stadium features 4,300 club seats and 68 luxury suites.

=== Design and layout ===
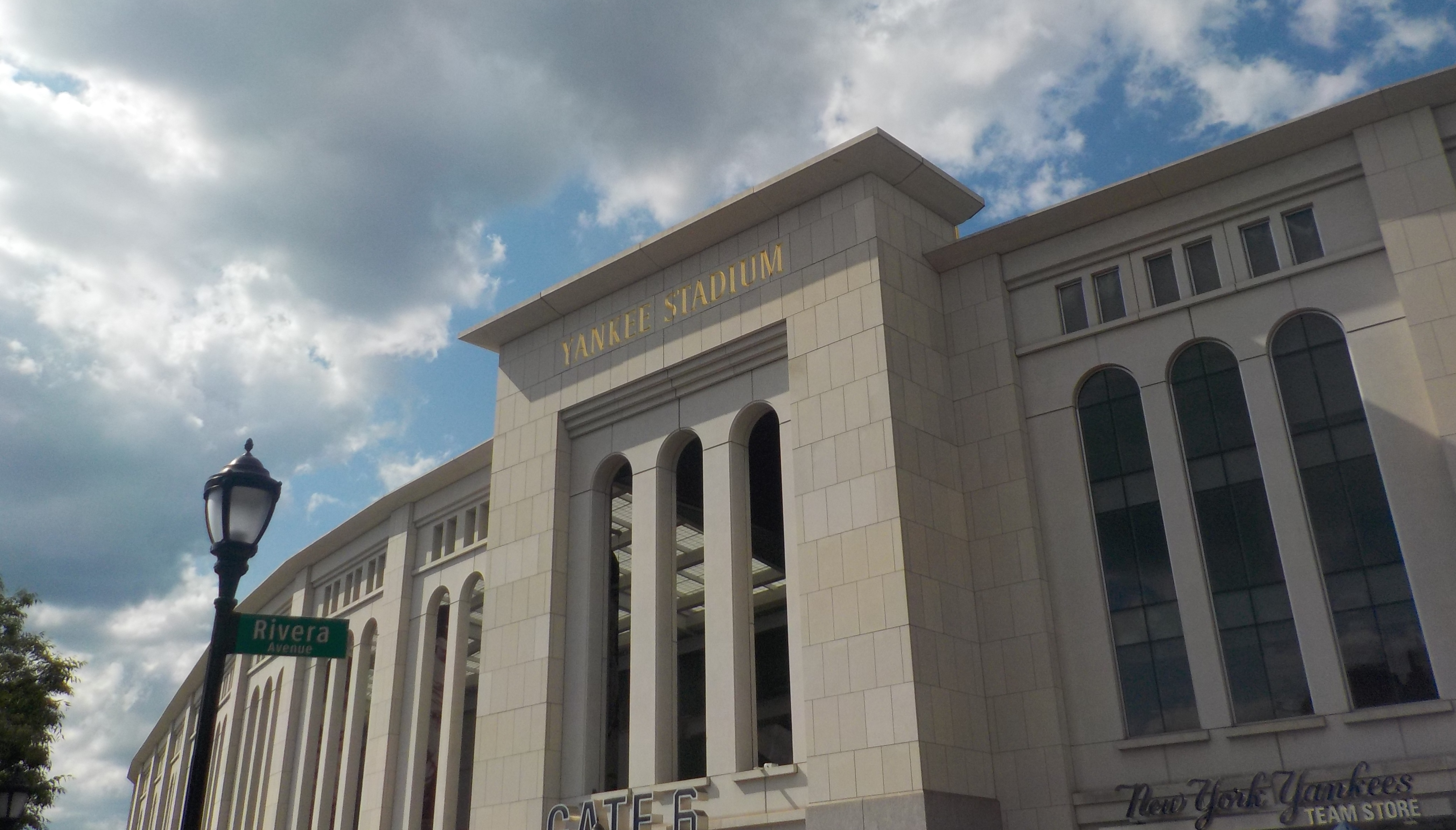

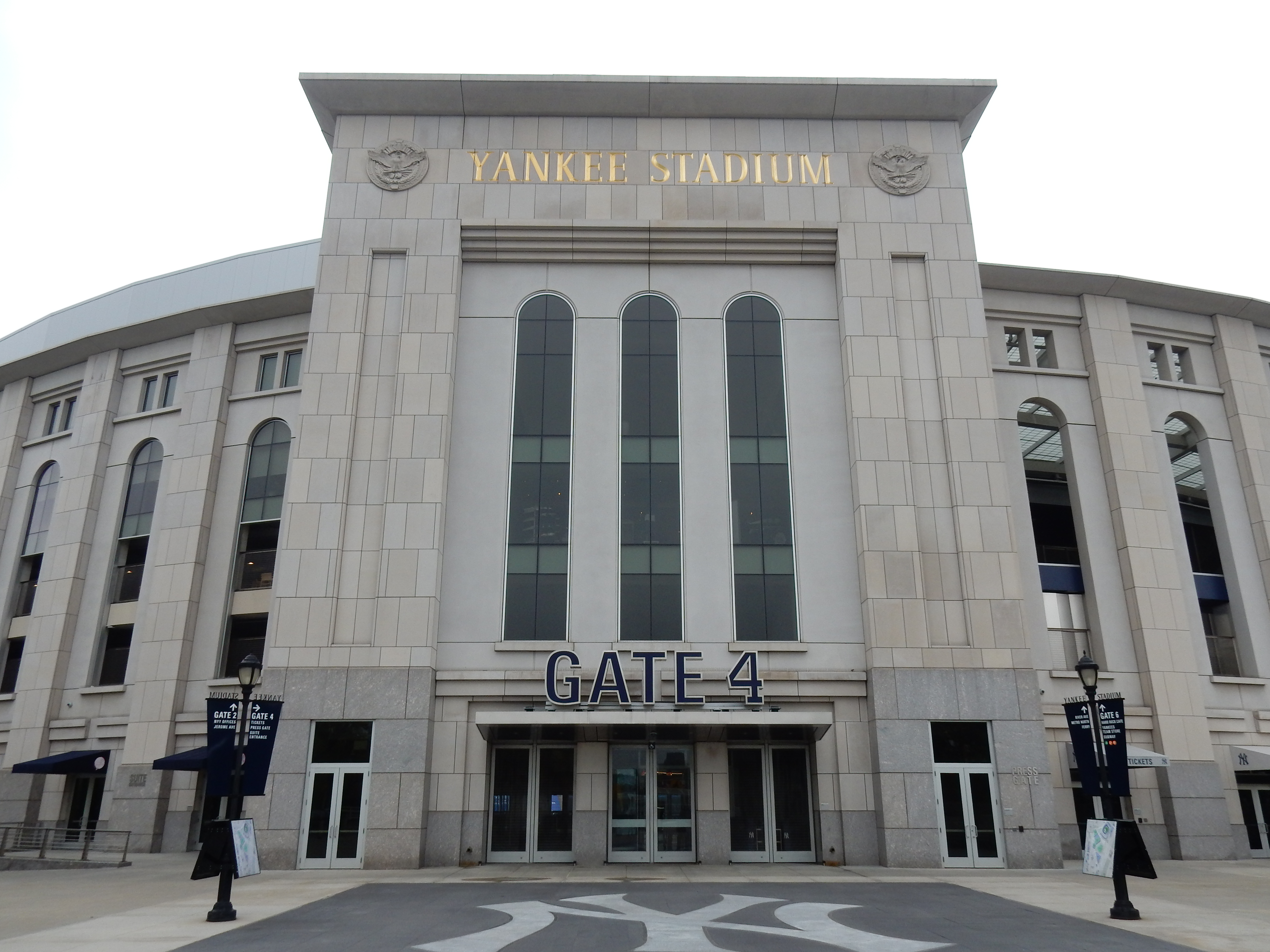
The Indiana limestone exterior, shown in both pictures, at Gate 6 and 4, mirrors that used on the original Yankee Stadium in 1923.

The stadium was designed by the architectural firm Populous. The exterior was made from 11,000 pieces of Indiana limestone, along with granite and pre-cast concrete. The limestone is from the same quarry that produced the limestone for the Empire State Building. It features the building's name V-cut and gold-leaf lettered above each gate. The interior of the stadium is adorned with hundreds of photographs capturing the history of the Yankees. The New York Daily News newspaper partnered with the Yankees for the exhibition "The Glory of the Yankees Photo Collection", which was selected from the Daily News' collection of over 2,000 photographs. Sports & The Arts was hired by the Yankees to curate the nearly 1,300 photographs that adorn the building from sources including the Daily News, Getty Images, the Baseball Hall of Fame and Major League Baseball.

The seats are laid out similar to the original Yankee Stadium's stands, with grandstand seating that stretches beyond the foul poles, as well as bleacher seats beyond the outfield fences. The Field Level and Main Level constitute the lower bowl, with suites on the H&R Block Level, and the Upper Level and Grandstand Level constituting the upper bowl. Approximately 2/3 of the stadium's seating is in the lower bowl, the inverse from the original Yankee Stadium. 46,537 fans can be seated, with a standing room capacity of 52,325 for baseball games. The new stadium's seating is spaced outward in a bowl, unlike the stacked-tiers design at the old stadium. This design places most fans farther back but lower to the field, by about an average of 30 feet (9.1 m). Over 56 suites are located within the ballpark, triple the amount from the previous stadium. Seats are 19–24 inches (48–61 cm) wide, up from the previous stadium's 18–22-inch (46–56 cm) wide seats, while there is 33–39 inches (84–99 cm) of leg room, up from 29.5 inches (75 cm) of leg room in the previous stadium. Many lower-level seats are cushioned, while all seats are equipped with cupholders. To allow for the extra seating space, the stadium's capacity is reduced by more than 4,000 seats in comparison to the previous stadium.

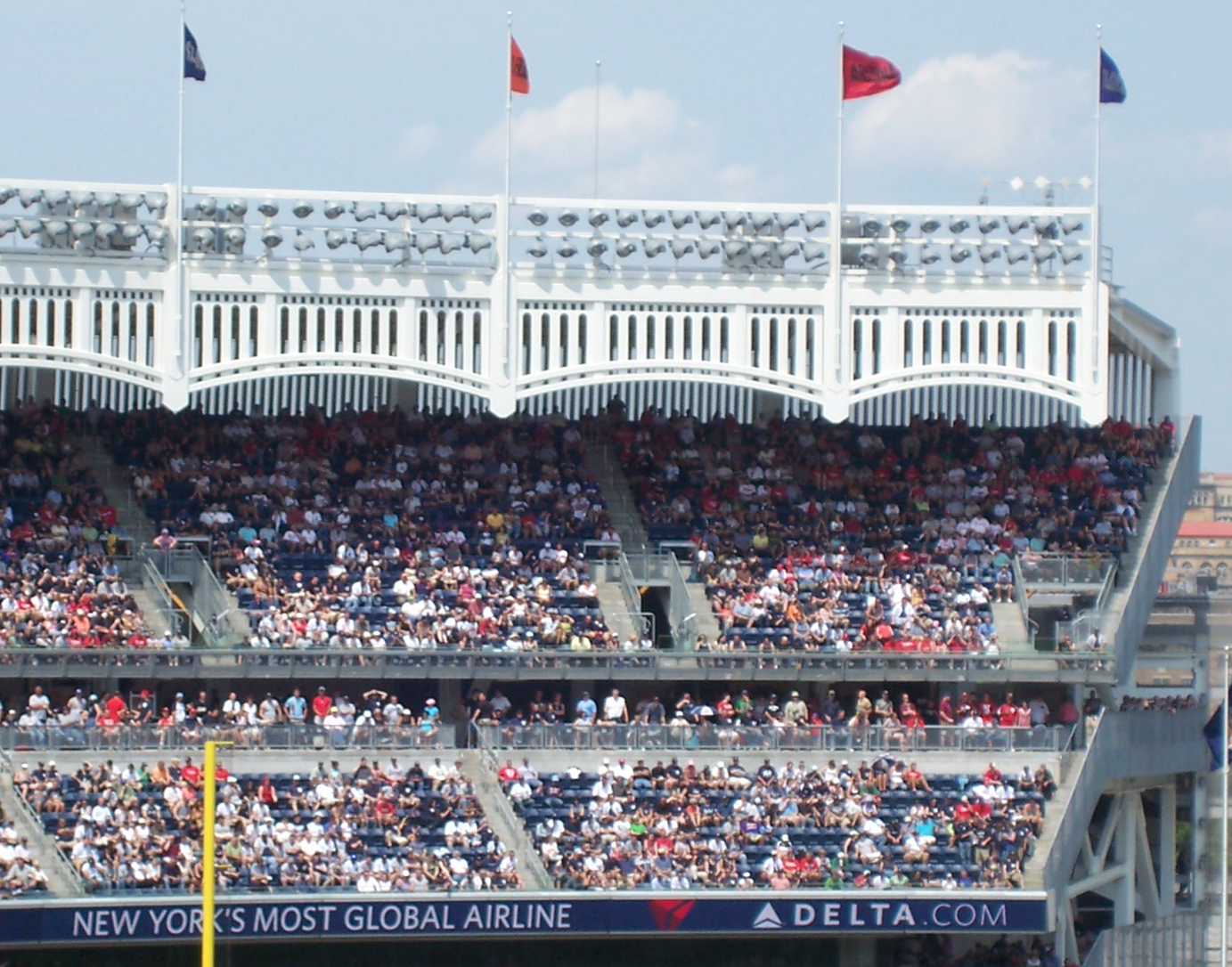
The iconic frieze that lined the roof of the original Yankee Stadium from 1923 to 1973 is replicated on the current stadium's roof.

Many design elements of the ballpark's interior are inspired by the original Yankee Stadium. The roof of the new facility features a replica of the frieze that was a trademark of the previous ballpark. In the original Yankee Stadium, a copper frieze originally lined the roof of the upper deck stands, but it was torn down during the 1974–75 renovations and replicated atop the wall beyond the bleachers. The new stadium replicates the frieze in its original location along the upper deck stands. Made of steel coated with zinc for rust protection, it is part of the support system for the cantilevers holding up the top deck and the lighting on the roof. The wall beyond the bleacher seats is "cut out" to reveal the 4 subway trains as they pass by, like they were in the original facility. A manually operated auxiliary scoreboard was built into the left and right field fences, in the same locations it existed in the pre-renovation iteration of the original Yankee Stadium. They were removed in favor of digital advertising signage prior to the 2022 season.

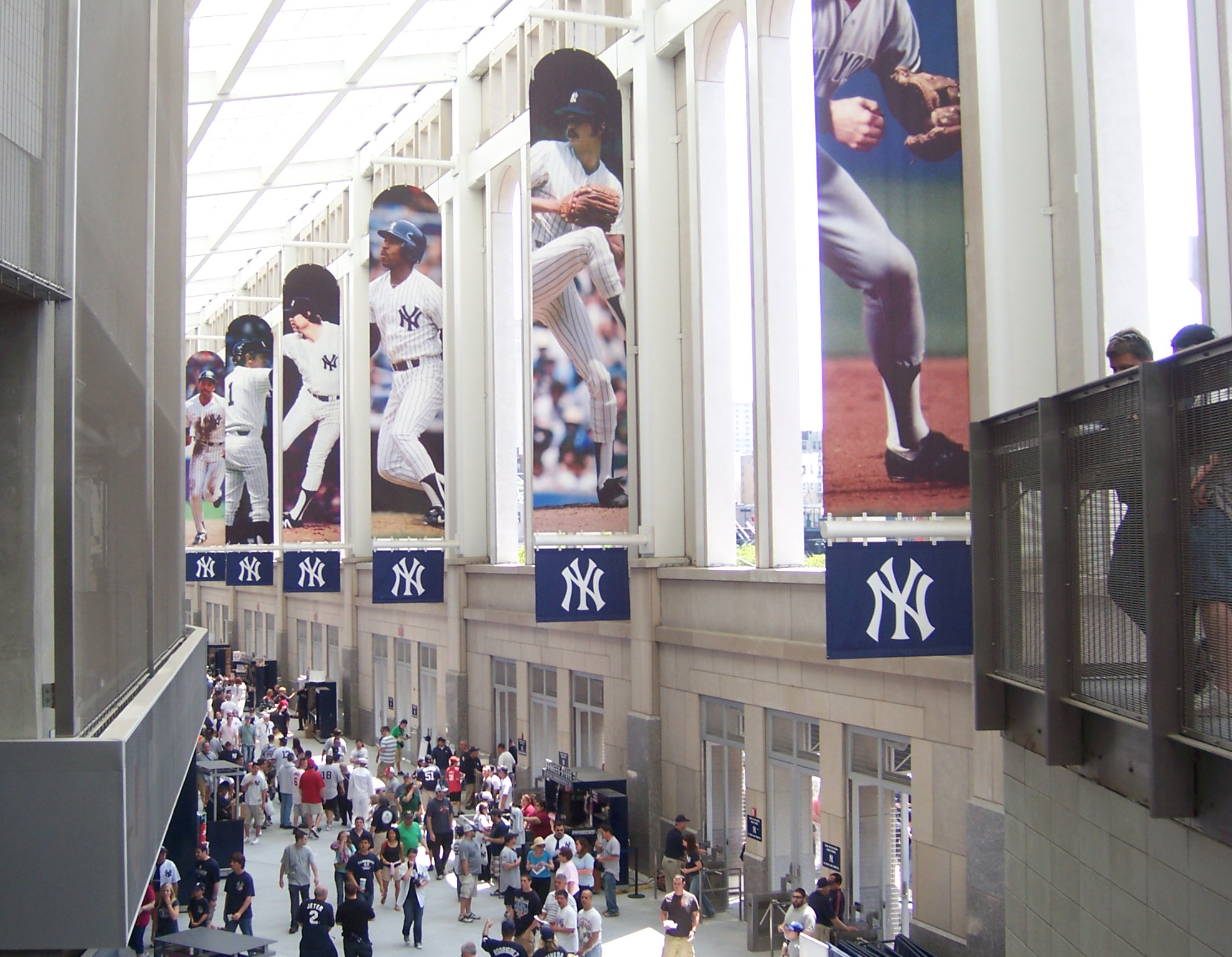
The Great Hall is situated along the southern front of the stadium.

Between the exterior perimeter wall and interior of the stadium is the "Great Hall", a large open air concourse that runs between Gates 4 and 6. With seven-story ceilings, the Great Hall is the largest open air public entry way at any sports venue in the world and features more than 31,000 square feet (2,900 m^{2}) of retail space and is lined with 20 banners of past and present Yankees superstars. The Great Hall features a 5-by-383-foot (1.5 by 116.7 m) LED (light-emitting diode) ribbon display as well as a 25-by-36-foot (7.6 by 11.0 m) LED video display above the entrance.

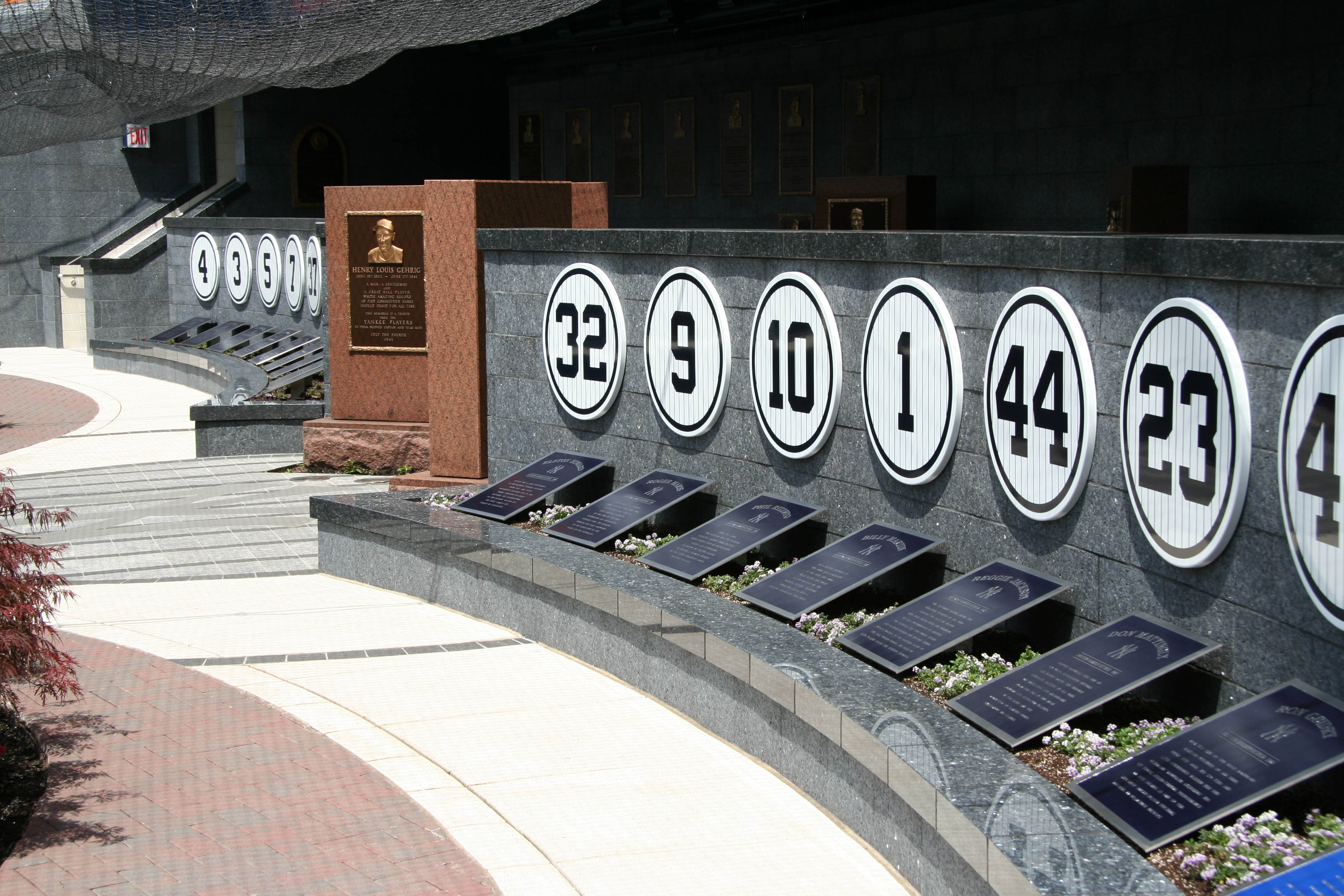
Monument Park, located beyond the center field fence

Monument Park, which features the Yankees' retired numbers, as well as monuments and plaques dedicated to distinguished Yankees, has been moved from its location beyond the left field fences in the original Yankee Stadium to its new location beyond the center field fences at the new facility. Monument Park is now situated under the sports bar; black shades cover the monuments on the back wall during games to prevent interference with the vision of the batter. The new location of the monuments is meant to mirror their original placement in center field at the original pre-renovation Yankee Stadium, albeit when they were on the playing field. The transfer of Monument Park from the old stadium to the new stadium began on November 10, 2008. The first monuments were put in place on February 23, 2009. Yankees pitcher Mariano Rivera requested that the Yankees reposition the team's bullpen, as well as add a door to connect the Yankees' bullpen to Monument Park, in order to allow access to it by Yankee relievers. The organization complied with his request.

=== Field dimensions and playing surface ===
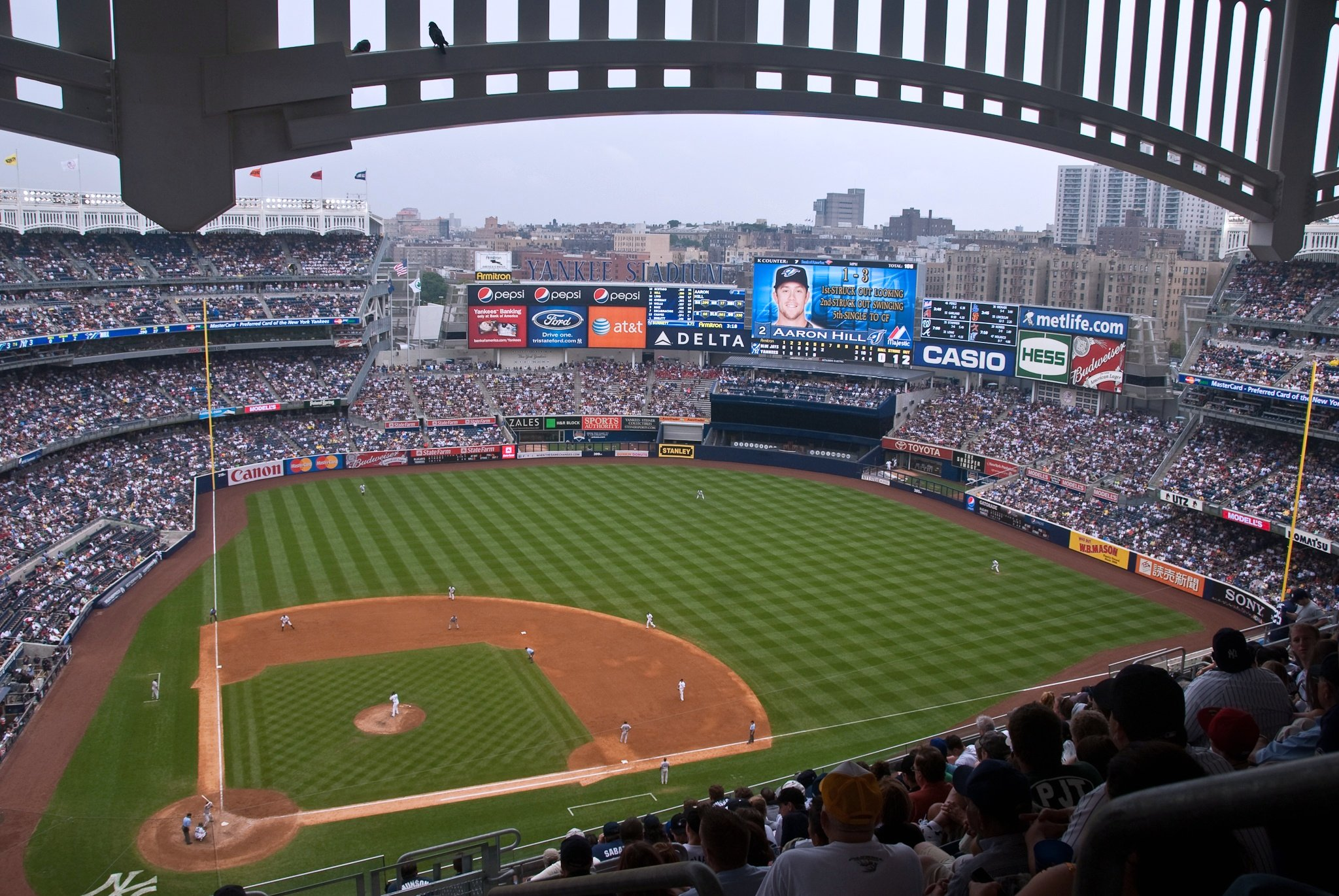
The view from the Grandstand Level (400 Level) August 12, 2009

The field dimensions for the large outfield fences have the same distance markers as the original facility prior to closing yet the dimensions are not identical. Due to the design of the right-field stands and the inclusion of an embedded manual scoreboard, the right-field wall is an average of 5 feet (1.5 m) closer to home plate. Overall, the fences measure 318 feet (97 m) to left field, 399 feet (122 m) to left-center field, 408 feet (124 m) to center field, 385 feet (117 m) to right-center field, and 314 feet (96 m) to right field. At the old Yankee Stadium, the right field wall curved from the right-field corner to straightaway center, while at the new ballpark the fence takes a sharp, almost entirely straight angle. This results in a difference at certain points between the right field markers of as much as 9 feet (2.7 m). The dimensions in left field are substantially the same despite the presence of an embedded auxiliary scoreboard there as well. All these differences make the current Yankee Stadium more hitter-friendly to right field than the original one post-renovation.

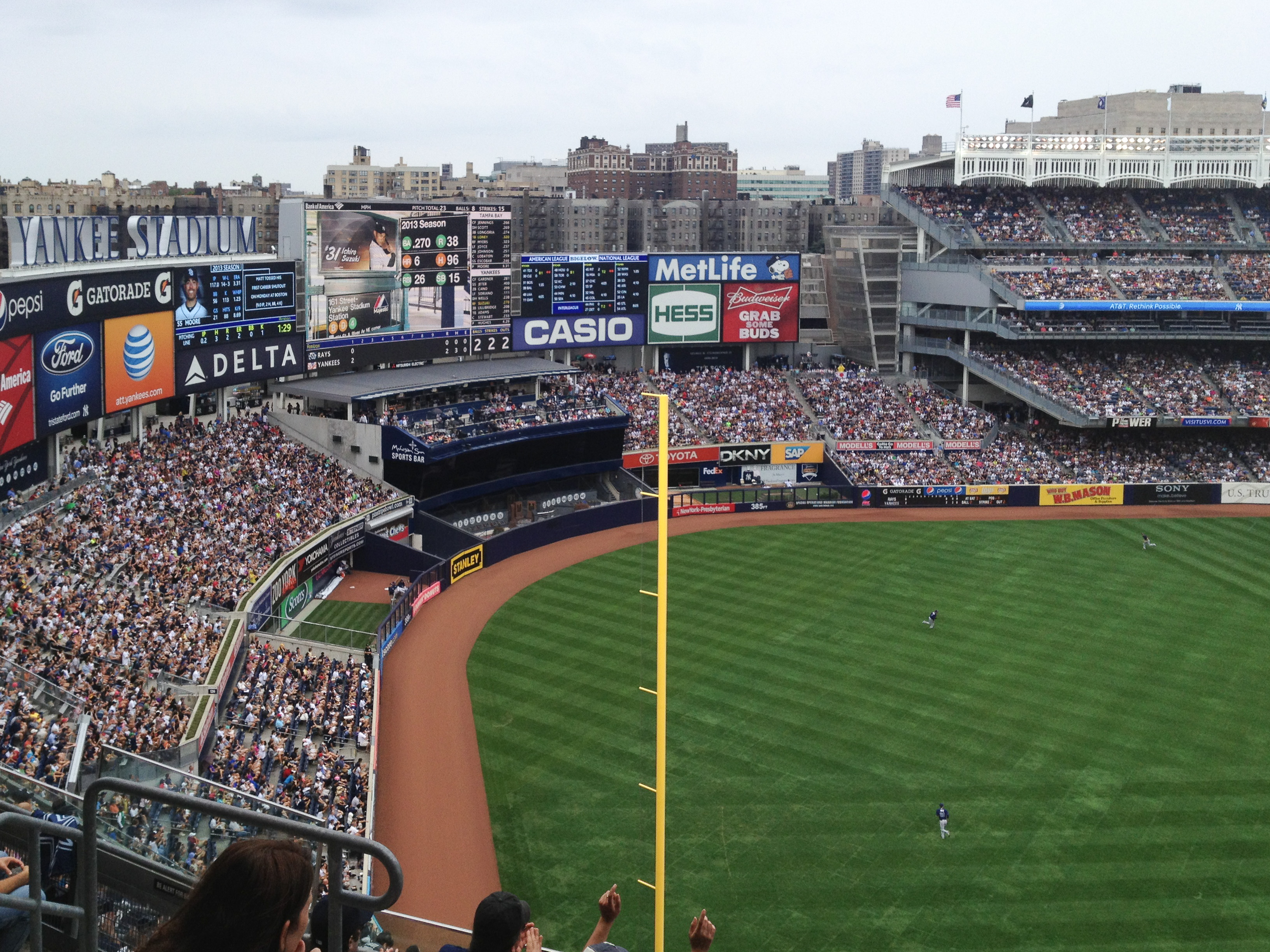
A view of the curvature of the outfield fences

The outfield fences measure 8 feet 5 inches (2.57 m) high from the left-field foul pole until the Yankees' bullpen, when the fences begin to gradually descend in height until the right field foul pole, where they are 8 feet (2.4 m) tall. This also marks a decrease from the previous Yankee Stadium, where the right field wall stood at a height of approximately 10 feet (3.0 m). The distance from home plate to the backstop is 52 feet 4 inches (15.95 m), a reduction of 20 feet (6.1 m) from the previous facility. The field is made up of Kentucky bluegrass, the same surface as the previous stadium, which is grown on a 1,300-acre (530 ha) farm in Bridgeton, New Jersey. The grass is equipped with a drainage system (featuring over 14,000 feet (4,300 m) of pipe) that makes the field playable an hour after taking 2 inches (51 mm) of rain.

==== Comparison with the 1923 stadium ====
Characteristics		Old stadium (in 2008)	New stadium
Opening day		April 18, 1923	April 16, 2009
Capacity		56,886	50,287
Seat width		18 inches (46 cm)–22 inches (56 cm)	19 inches (48 cm)–24 inches (61 cm)
Seat length		29.5 inches (75 cm)	33 inches (84 cm)–39 inches (99 cm)
Concourse width (average)		17 feet (5.2 m)	32 feet (9.8 m)
Cup holders		Select Field Level Seating	For every seat in General Seating
Luxury suites		19	56
Club seats		—	4,300
Team stores		6,800 square feet (630 m^{2})	11,560 square feet (1,074 m^{2})
Restroom fixture ratio		1 per 89 fans	1 per 60 fans
Public elevators (passenger lifts)		3 (Otis Traction)	16 (KONE Traction)
Video scoreboard		25 feet (7.6 m) by 33 feet (10 m) (SD LED)	59 feet (18 m) by 101 feet (31 m) (HD LED)
Distance from Home Plate to:	Backstop	72 feet 4 inches (22 m)	52 feet 4 inches (16 m)
Distance from Home Plate to:	Left field	318 feet (97 m)	
Distance from Home Plate to:	Left center	399 feet (120 m)	
Distance from Home Plate to:	Center field	408 feet (124 m)	
Distance from Home Plate to:	Right center	385 feet (120 m)	
Distance from Home Plate to:	Right field	314 feet (96 m)	

Source: New York Yankees

=== Amenities and facilities ===
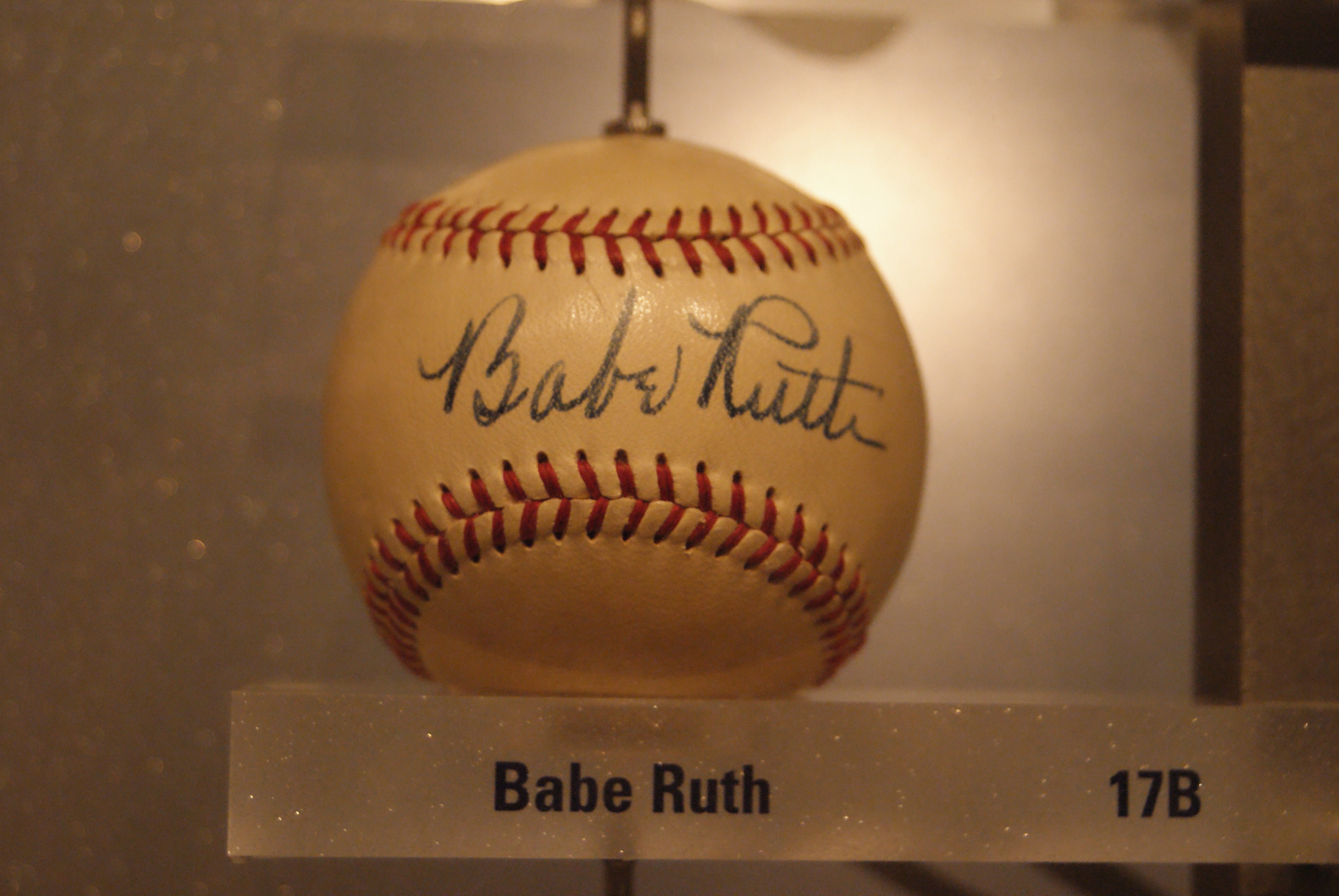

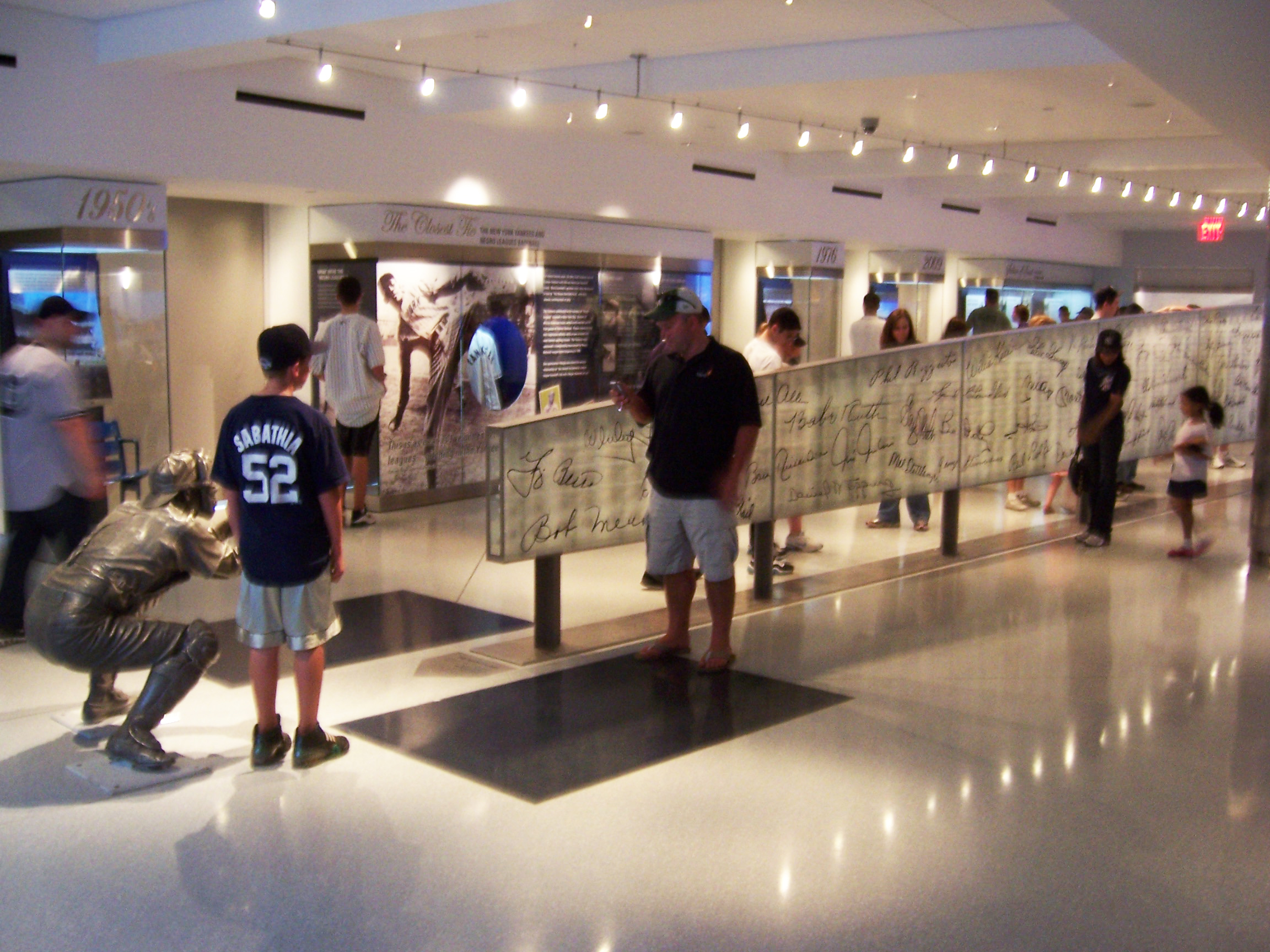
A signature by Babe Ruth is one of many autographs in the "ball wall", the centerpiece of the Yankee Museum.

Yankee Stadium features a wide array of amenities. It contains 63% more space, 500,000 square feet (46,000 m^{2}) more in total, than the previous stadium, with wider concourses and open sight lines on concourses. Along with 227 miles (365 km) of wired Ethernet cable, the building has sufficient fiber-optic cable wiring that Cisco Vice President and Treasurer David Holland calls the building "future proof". Over 1,100 HD video monitors are placed within the stadium and approximately $10 million worth of baseball merchandise is housed within the ballpark.

The center field scoreboard, manufactured by Mitsubishi Diamond Vision, measures 59 x 101 feet (31 m) and offers 5,925 square feet (550.5 m^{2}) of viewing area. It was the third-largest HD scoreboard in the world when it opened (behind the 8,736-square-foot (811.6 m^{2}) board at newly renovated Kauffman Stadium and the new 8,066-square-foot (749.4 m^{2}) board at the renovated Tokyo Racecourse). Since then, it has also been surpassed by what was the world's largest scoreboard at AT&T Stadium and the new scoreboard at the Philadelphia Phillies' Citizens Bank Park. Displaying 5,925 sq ft (550.5 m^{2}) of video, the scoreboard can display four 1080p HD images simultaneously. In 2026, Daktronics installed a new LED center field scoreboard and two flanking boards upgraded with 8-millimeter pixel spacing to deliver higher resolution imagery with wider angle visibility. The LED ribbon displays mounted to the seating fascia along the 200 and 300 Levels were also upgraded.

The Yankees clubhouse features 30,000 square feet (2,880 m^{2}) of space, over 2.5 times the space of the clubhouse from the previous facility. The dressing area alone features 3,344 sq ft (310.7 m^{2}) of space, with each locker equipped with a safety deposit box and touch-screen computer. The Yankees clubhouse features a weight room, training room, video room, and lounge area, while both teams' clubhouses have their own indoor batting cages. The Yankees' therapy room features a hydrotherapy pool with an underwater treadmill. The Yankees are believed to be the first team to chemically treat their uniforms, as well as the showering surfaces with an anti-bacterial agent that reduces the risk of infection.

The New York Yankees Museum, located on the lower level at Gate 6, displays a wide range of Yankees' memorabilia. A "Ball Wall" features hundreds of balls autographed by past and present Yankees, and there are plans to eventually add autographs for every living player who has played for the Yankees. The centerpiece of the museum is a tribute to Don Larsen's perfect game in the 1956 World Series, with a commemorative home plate in the floor and statues of Larsen pitching to Yogi Berra. Along with a facsimile of a current locker from the Yankees' clubhouse, fans can view the locker of the late Thurman Munson, which sat unoccupied in the previous stadium's Yankee clubhouse in honor of Munson.

== Food at the stadium ==
The ballpark offers a wide choice of restaurants. There are 25 fixed concessions stands, along with 112 movable ones. A Hard Rock Cafe is located within the ballpark, but it is open to anyone at the 161st St. and River Ave. entrance year round. The Hard Rock Cafe at Yankee Stadium officially opened on March 30, 2009, and an opening ceremony took place on April 2, 2009. A steakhouse called NYY Steak is located beyond right field. Celebrity chefs will occasionally make appearances at the ballpark's restaurants and help prepare food for fans in premium seating over the course of the season. Above Monument Park is the Center Field Sports Bar, whose tinted black glass acts as the ballpark's batter's eye. The MasterCard Batters Eye Deck, which is located above centerfield, serves as a large space that can hold 250 guests. Food operations are managed by Legends Hospitality, which is operated by the executive chef Robert Flowers.

== Public opinion ==
=== Opening and public perception ===
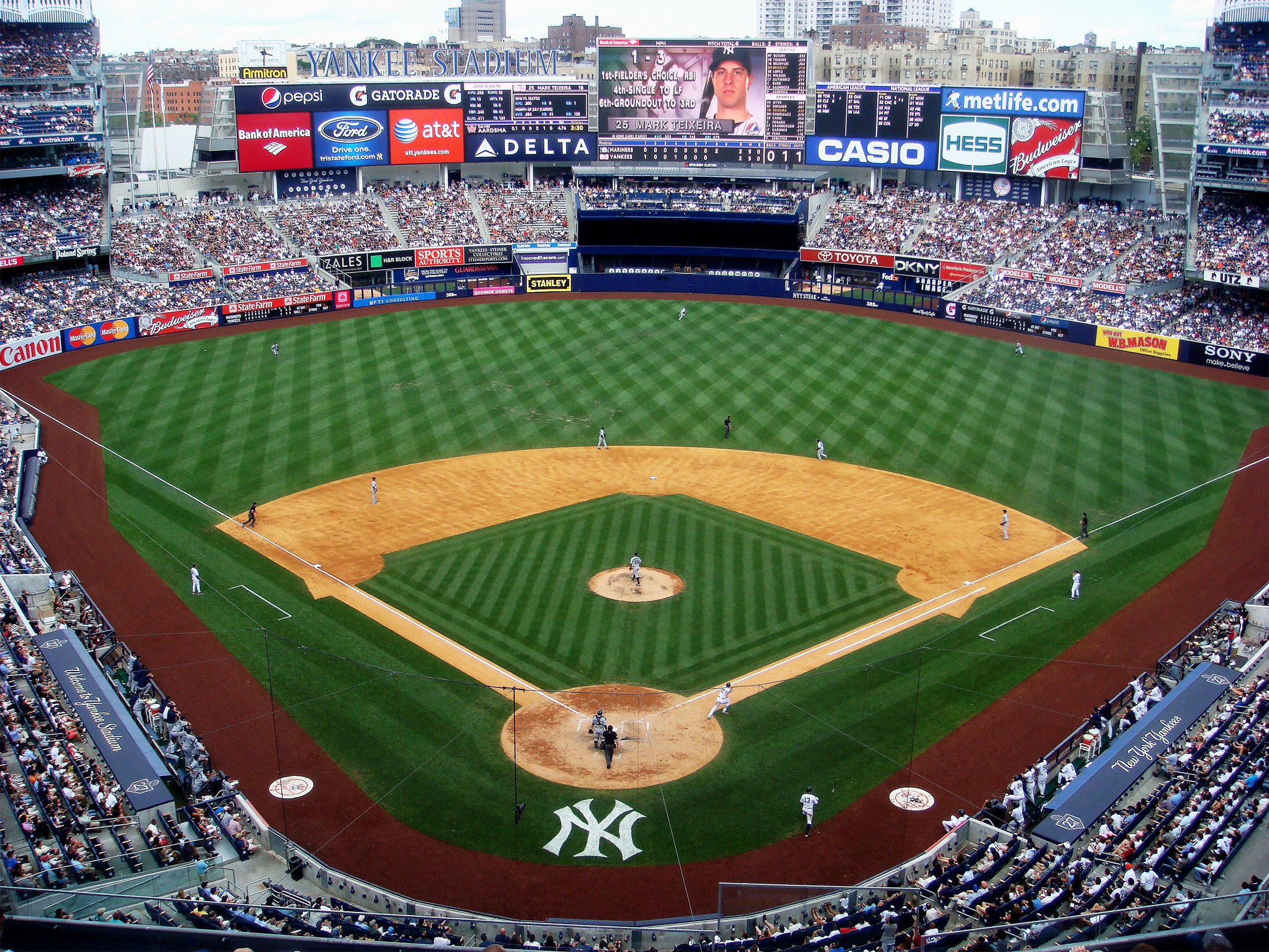
The stadium, as seen from the upper deck in 2010

Although Yankee Stadium has been praised for its amenities, it also has been widely criticized for high ticket prices. Seats within the first eight rows in the lower bowl, called the "Legends Suite", are among the highest-priced tickets in professional sports. Tickets cost $510 on average; the most expensive tickets cost $2,600 each. Legends Suite Seats have been regularly empty, with many ticket holders in this section having given up their tickets, and others remaining unsold, despite most other seats in the ballpark selling out. This has created an embarrassing image on television of the seats behind home plate being almost completely vacant. Consequently, a surplus of tickets for Legends Seats have emerged in the secondary market, and with supply exceeding demand, resale prices have dropped. Empty seats in the Legends Suite could even be seen during the 2009 playoffs, including World Series games. Even though all playoff games were sellouts, Legends Suite ticket holders were in the lounges and the restaurant underneath instead of their seats. Overall, the average ticket price is $63, the highest in baseball.

Legends Suite seats are also separate from the other lower bowl seating and are vigorously patrolled by stadium security, with the divider being described as a "concrete moat." Fans who do not have tickets within this premium section in the front rows are not allowed in the section. This includes standing behind the dugouts during batting practice and to seek autographs. The least expensive seats, the bleachers, initially left many fans disappointed, as the indoor club seating area in center field obstructed the views from bleacher seats on both sides in sections 201 and 239. These severely obstructed sections would ultimately be removed during the 2016–2017 off-season in favor of outdoor bars and patio called Franks Red Hot Terrace in left center and Toyota Terrace in right center. These new areas are complete with standing terraces accessible to all ticket holders, in addition to replacing the seating on top of the center field club with standing terraces, drastically reducing the number of obstructed views from center field in the process.

The Yankee Stadium staff was also criticized for an incident during a May 4, 2009 game, which was interrupted by a rain delay. Fans were told by some staff members that the game was unlikely to resume and consequently, many fans exited the stadium, only for the game to eventually resume play. The fans that left the ballpark were not permitted to re-enter, per the stadium's re-entry policy, and many subsequently got into arguments with stadium personnel. In response to the backlash the Yankees received for the incident, the staff members were required to sign a gag order preventing them from speaking to media, but they did indicate that communication for rain delays would be improved.

Late in the stadium's first season, cracks were seen on the concrete ramps of the Stadium. The Yankees are trying to determine whether there was something wrong with the concrete, or the ramps' installation or design. The company involved in inspecting the concrete was indicted on charges that its employees either faked or failed to perform some required tests and falsified the results of others.

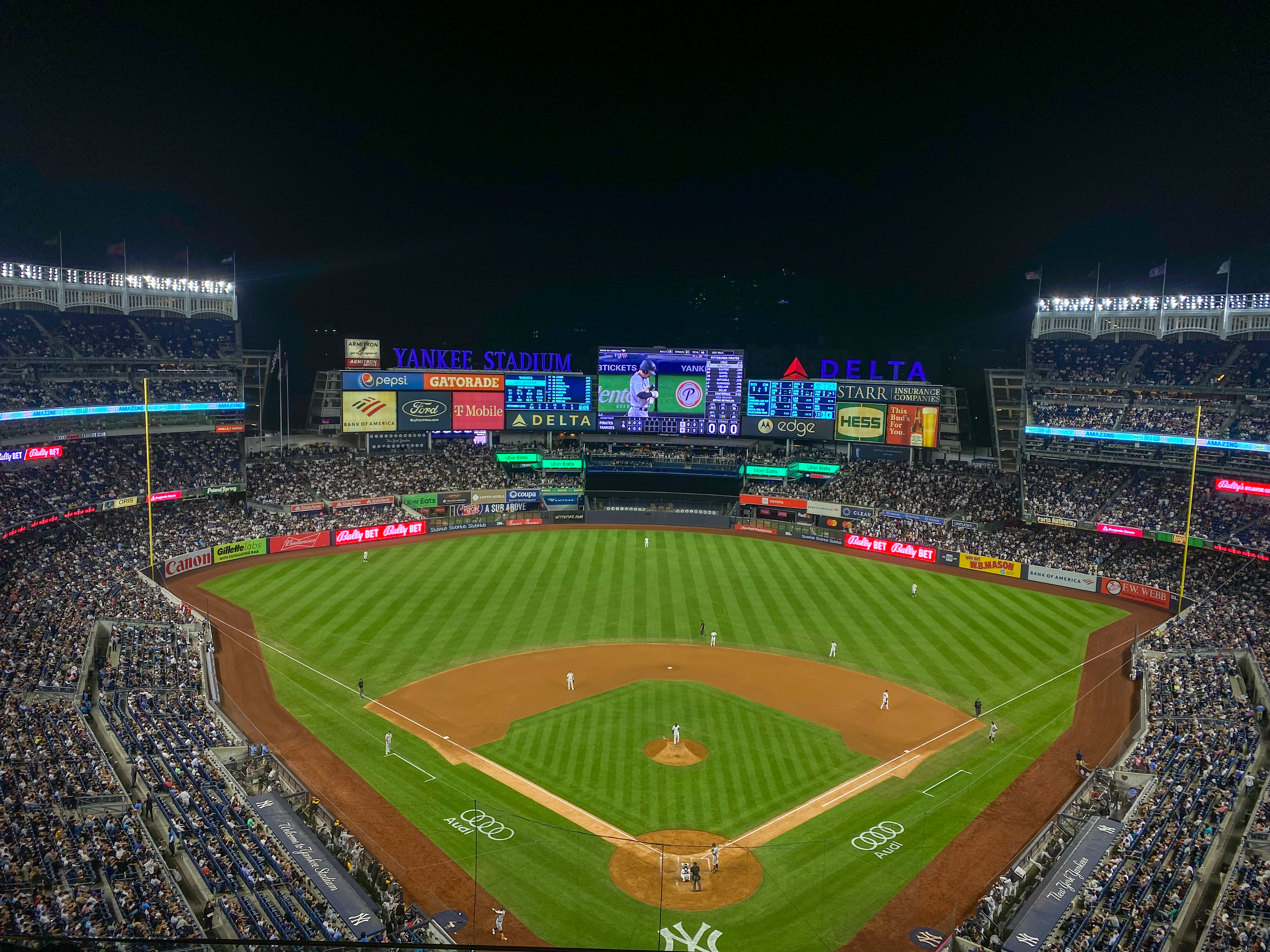
A nighttime view of a game in September 2022

The stadium has also been criticized for its lack of fan noise. During a Sunday Night Baseball telecast in 2012, commentator and former Red Sox manager Terry Francona spoke about the different atmospheres in the old and new stadiums saying that "As a visiting team, especially for the Red Sox, by the time the (national) anthem was over, you couldn't wait to get back in the dugout. Now (there is) a little different (kind) of fan sitting around down there by the dugout." Games at the new stadium do not feature the same deafening crowd moments and often sound eerily silent. The lack of fan noise was noticeable in the 2012 playoffs as well, with thousands of unsold seats for Game 5 of the ALDS and Games 1 and 2 of the ALCS. "This is a very easy place to play now," said Quintin Berry of the Detroit Tigers, the Yankees' ALCS opponents. "Coming from Oakland, the fans there were so rowdy. It was easier to come here." In his autobiography The Closer, the Yankees' longtime relief pitcher Mariano Rivera wrote about the new stadium's atmosphere: "It doesn't hold noise, or home-team fervor, anywhere near the way the old place did. The old Stadium was our 10th man—a loud and frenzied cauldron of pinstriped passion, with a lot of lifers in the stands. Maybe I'm wrong, but it's hard to see that the new place can ever quite duplicate that." Derek Jeter echoed this sentiment in a September 2014 article in New York magazine, in which he said he missed the original Yankee Stadium: "It was a different feel. The new stadium, its second to none—all the amenities. For the players, it really doesn't get any better. The old stadium, if you were at the stadium, in the stands, the only place you could see the game was in your seat. Now there's so many suites and places people can go. So a lot of times it looks like it's empty, but it's really not. The old stadium, it was more intimidating. The fans were right on top of you."

Starting in 2017, the new stadium began to sound like the old stadium especially during the 2017 American League Championship Series against the Houston Astros. In Game 4 specifically, the stadium was raucous and loud where the Yankees rallied and won 6–4. The crowd noise and atmosphere may have even caused an Astros miscue in the eighth inning. After the game, several Yankees commented on the crowd noise and the atmosphere it created. In a New York Times article following the game, CC Sabathia said "It felt like the old stadium tonight" and "This is as loud as I’ve ever heard it". Aaron Judge said "Deafening, just deafening." He went on to say "You try to talk to the person next to you, but you can’t hear a thing. It was crazy." Todd Frazier said "We still felt confident, and the crowd played a huge part in it." and Brett Gardner, a Yankee since 2008, said "Tonight was about as loud as it gets."

=== Early propensity for home runs ===
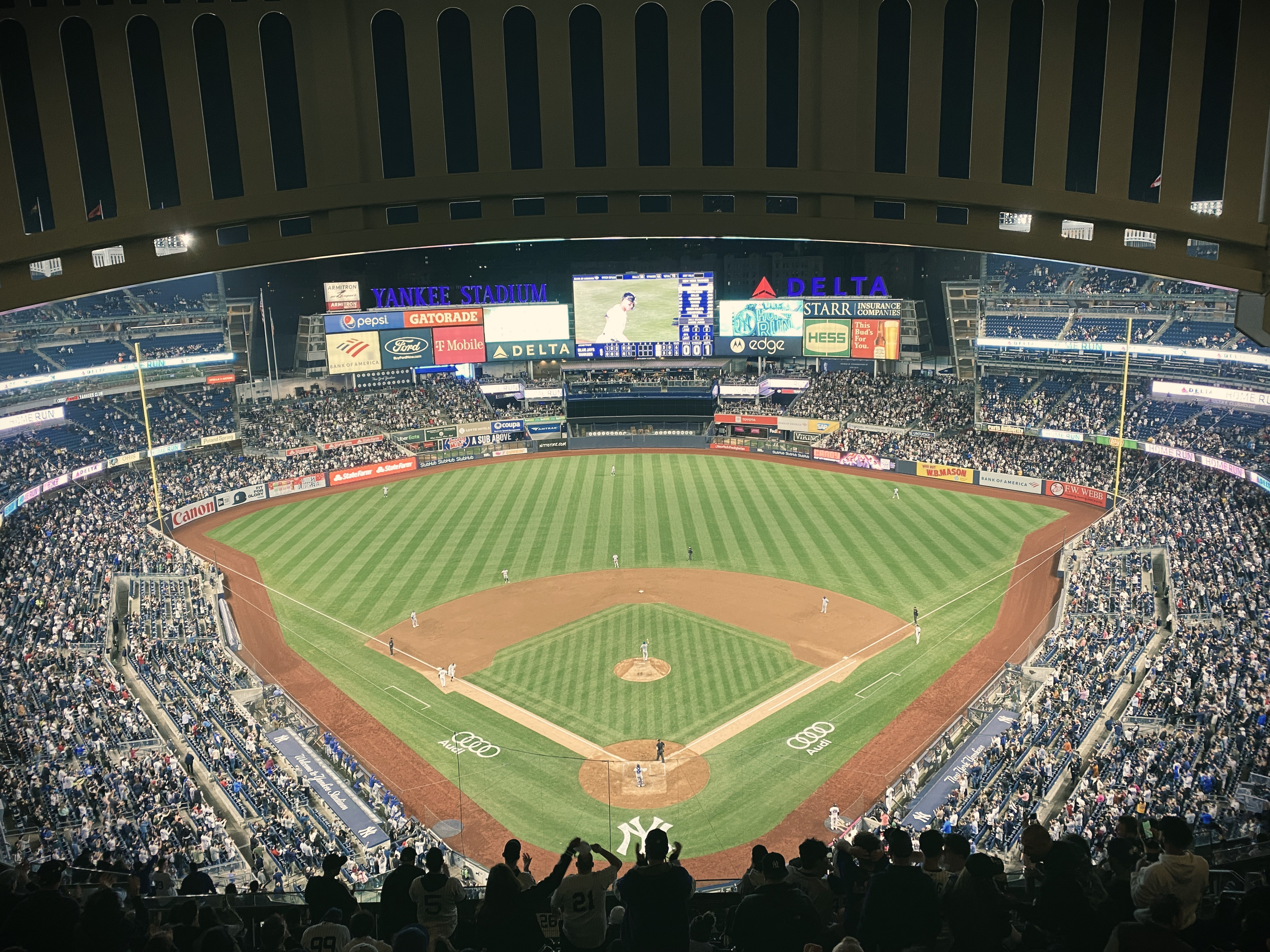
Aaron Judge circles the bases after hitting his first home run of the 2022 season against the Toronto Blue Jays

In its first season, Yankee Stadium quickly acquired a reputation as a "bandbox" and a "launching pad" because of the high number of home runs hit at the new ballpark. Through its first 23 games, 87 home runs were hit at the venue, easily besting Enron Field's (now called Daikin Park) previous record set in 2000. Early in the season, Yankee Stadium was on pace to break Coors Field's 1999 single-season record of 303 home runs allowed, and the hometown Daily News (using the back-page headline "HOMERS ODYSSEY") started publishing a daily graphic comparing each stadium's home run totals through a similar number of games.

ESPN commentator Peter Gammons denounced the new facility as "one of the biggest jokes in baseball" during an appearance on Mike and Mike in the Morning, and concluded that "[it] was not a very well-planned ballpark". Likewise, Gammons' ESPN colleague Buster Olney described the stadium as "a veritable wind tunnel" and likened it to his childhood Wiffle-ball park. Newsday columnist Wallace Matthews joined in the criticism, labeling the stadium "ridiculous" and accused "the franchise that took ownership of the home run" of cheapening it. He suggested that Babe Ruth could have potentially hit 120 or more homers if he played in the new Stadium. For his column, Matthews interviewed former Yankee Reggie Jackson, who termed the park "too small" to contain current player Alex Rodriguez. Jackson estimated that the park might enable the third baseman to hit 75 home runs in a season.

A variety of theories have been posited to account for the dramatic increase in home runs at the new Yankee Stadium over the original stadium, foremost among these the sharper angles of the outfield walls and the speculated presence of a wind tunnel. During construction of the new ballpark, engineers commissioned a wind study, the results of which indicated there would be no noticeable difference between the two stadiums. The franchise planned a second study, but Major League rules prohibit a team from making any changes to the playing field until the off-season.

An independent study by the weather service provider AccuWeather in June 2009 concluded that the shape and height of the right field wall, rather than the wind, is responsible for the proliferation of home runs at the stadium. AccuWeather's analysis found that roughly 20% of the home runs hit at the new ballpark would not have been home runs at the old ballpark due to the gentle curve of its right field corner, and its 10-foot (3.0 m) wall height. Nothing was observed in wind speeds and patterns that would account for the increase.

The number of home runs hit at the new stadium slowed significantly as the season progressed, but a new single-season record for most home runs hit at a Yankee home ballpark was nonetheless set in the Yankees' 73rd home game of 2009 when Vladimir Guerrero of the Los Angeles Angels of Anaheim hit the 216th home run of the season at the venue, surpassing the previous record of 215 set at the original Yankee Stadium in 2005. However, the Yankees offense, as in previous years, had employed many home run hitters in 2009. The Yankees hit 108 home runs while playing on the road, the second most in baseball behind the Philadelphia Phillies.

In 2010, the early rate of home runs were markedly less through May 15, 2010, with 35 home runs hit in 14 games for 2.5 per game (a projection of 205—in 2009, the stadium finished at 2.93 per game for a total of 237). Even though the stadium's home run rate decreased slightly for the 2010 season to 2.73 per game, it was still the highest figure in the majors. However, the prolific home run rate of April and May 2009 that drew criticism has not sustained itself over any season thus far, and while through the first two months of the 2011 season the Yankees hit far more homers than any other team in the majors, Yankee Stadium was not the top home run park.

== Stadium firsts ==
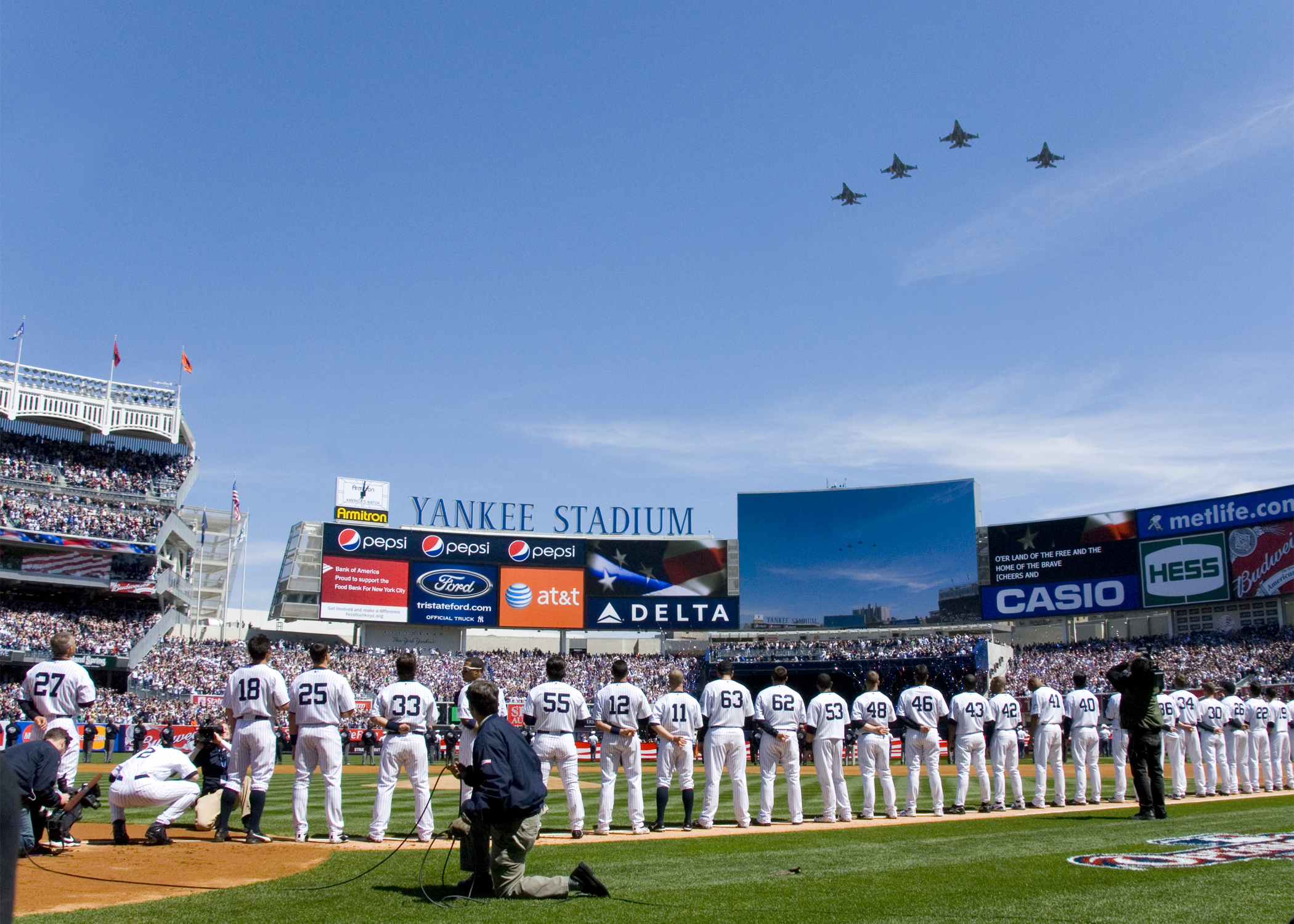
Four F-16C Fighting Falcons from the 174th Fighter Wing fly over the "New" Yankee Stadium on Opening Day

Before the official Opening Day against the Cleveland Indians on April 16, 2009, the Yankees hosted a two-game exhibition series at the stadium in early April against the Chicago Cubs. The Yankees lost the stadium's first regular-season game to the Indians and 2008 Cy Young Award winner Cliff Lee by a score of 10–2. Before the Yankees went to bat for the first time, the bat that Babe Ruth used to hit his first home run at the old Yankee Stadium in 1923 was placed momentarily on home plate. In the bottom of the fifth inning of the same game, Jorge Posada hit the first Yankee home run in the new ballpark off of Lee, which also served as New York's first run at the new venue. Later in that game, Grady Sizemore of the Indians hit the first grand slam at the stadium, doing so off of Yankee relief pitcher Dámaso Marte in the top of the seventh inning. On July 2, 2009, Russell Branyan of the Seattle Mariners became the first player to hit a home run off of the Mohegan Sun Restaurant in center field.

Like its predecessor, the new Yankee Stadium hosted the World Series in its very first season. The first World Series game at the venue was a 6–1 loss to the Philadelphia Phillies on October 28, 2009; coincidentally, Phillies starter Cliff Lee, who won the first regular season game at the venue with the Indians prior to being traded to Philadelphia, was the winning pitcher in Game 1. The Yankees, however, rallied to win four of the next five, defeating the Phillies four games to two to win their 27th World Series championship. With the series-clinching 7–3 New York victory in Game 6 on November 4, 2009, Yankee Stadium also became the latest stadium to host a World Series-clinching victory by its home team in the venue's first season (after the St. Louis Cardinals won the World Series at Busch Stadium in 2006). The Yankees also became the only team to inaugurate two stadiums with World Series wins and also appeared in the 1976 World Series following the refurbishment of the original Yankee Stadium, losing to the Big Red Machine in a four-game sweep. On October 6, 2011, the Detroit Tigers defeated the Yankees 3–2 in Game 5 of the ALDS to become the first team to eliminate the Yankees at the new stadium in the postseason. On October 30, 2024, the Los Angeles Dodgers became the first visiting team to win a World Series at the venue when they erased a 5–0 deficit to defeat the Yankees 7–6 in Game 5 of the 2024 World Series.

Statistic	Exhibition	Regular season	Postseason
First game	April 3, 2009; Yankees 7, Cubs 4	April 16, 2009; Indians 10, Yankees 2	October 7, 2009; Yankees 7, Twins 2
Ceremonial First Pitch	Reggie Jackson	Yogi Berra	Eric T. Olson
First pitch	Chien-Ming Wang	CC Sabathia	CC Sabathia
First batter	Aaron Miles (Cubs)	Grady Sizemore (Indians)	Denard Span (Twins)
First hit	Aaron Miles (Cubs)	Johnny Damon	Denard Span (Twins)
First Yankees hit	Derek Jeter	Johnny Damon	Derek Jeter
First home run	Robinson Canó	Jorge Posada	Derek Jeter
First win	Chien-Ming Wang	Cliff Lee (Indians)	CC Sabathia
First save	Jonathan Albaladejo	Mariano Rivera (April 17)	Mariano Rivera

Many historic milestones and records have been achieved at Yankee Stadium. In 2009, Derek Jeter became the Yankees all-time hits leader with his 2,722nd hit, surpassing Lou Gehrig's 72-year record. The following season, Alex Rodriguez hit his 600th home run at the Stadium, becoming the youngest player to accomplish the feat. In 2011, three significant milestones were achieved at the stadium. In July, Jeter became the first Yankee to join the 3,000 hit club and collect all 3,000 hits with the franchise. The following month, the Yankees became the first team in history to hit three grand slams in a single game. As the regular season drew to a close, Mariano Rivera became the all-time leader in regular season saves, when he earned his 602nd save.

On April 20, 2016, the Oakland Athletics' Kendall Graveman became the first starting pitcher to bat at Yankee Stadium.

Due to the lack of games scheduled for teams not in the own league, San Diego Padres in the NL West was the final team to visit the Yankee Stadium in its new configuration on May 27, 2019. Yankees amassed a record of 24–5 for homes games against every opposing teams' first games visiting the current Yankee Stadium.

On June 25, 2022, new Yankee Stadium witnessed its first no-hitter when three Houston Astros pitchers (Cristian Javier, Héctor Neris, and Ryan Pressly) combine to no-hit the Yankees in a 3–0 win. The Astros were also the last team to no-hit the Yankees at the original Yankee Stadium in 2003.

== Accessibility and transportation ==
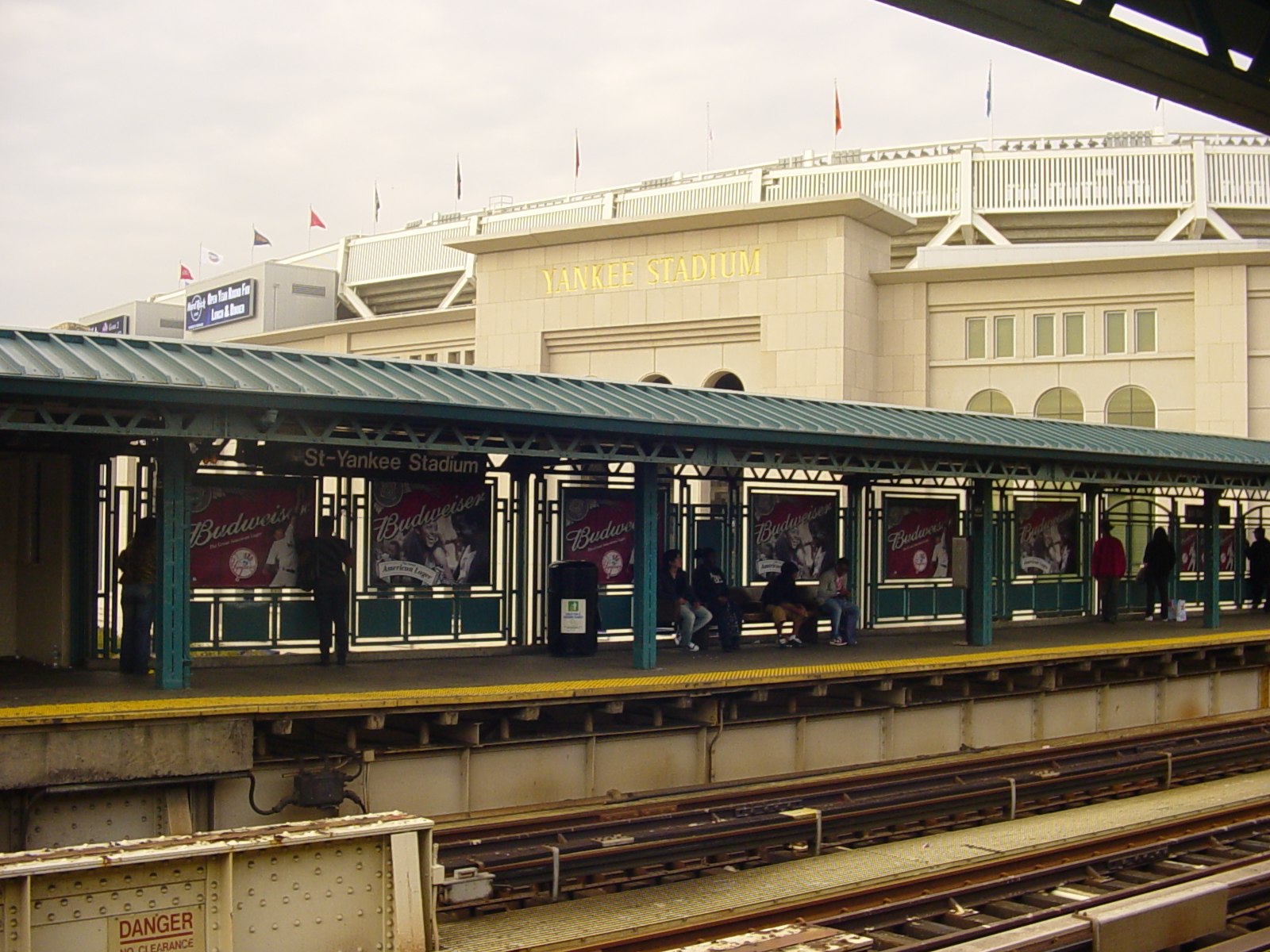
The stadium is serviced via subway by the 161st Street station on the IRT Jerome Avenue Line (shown) as well as the IND Concourse Line (underground, not shown).

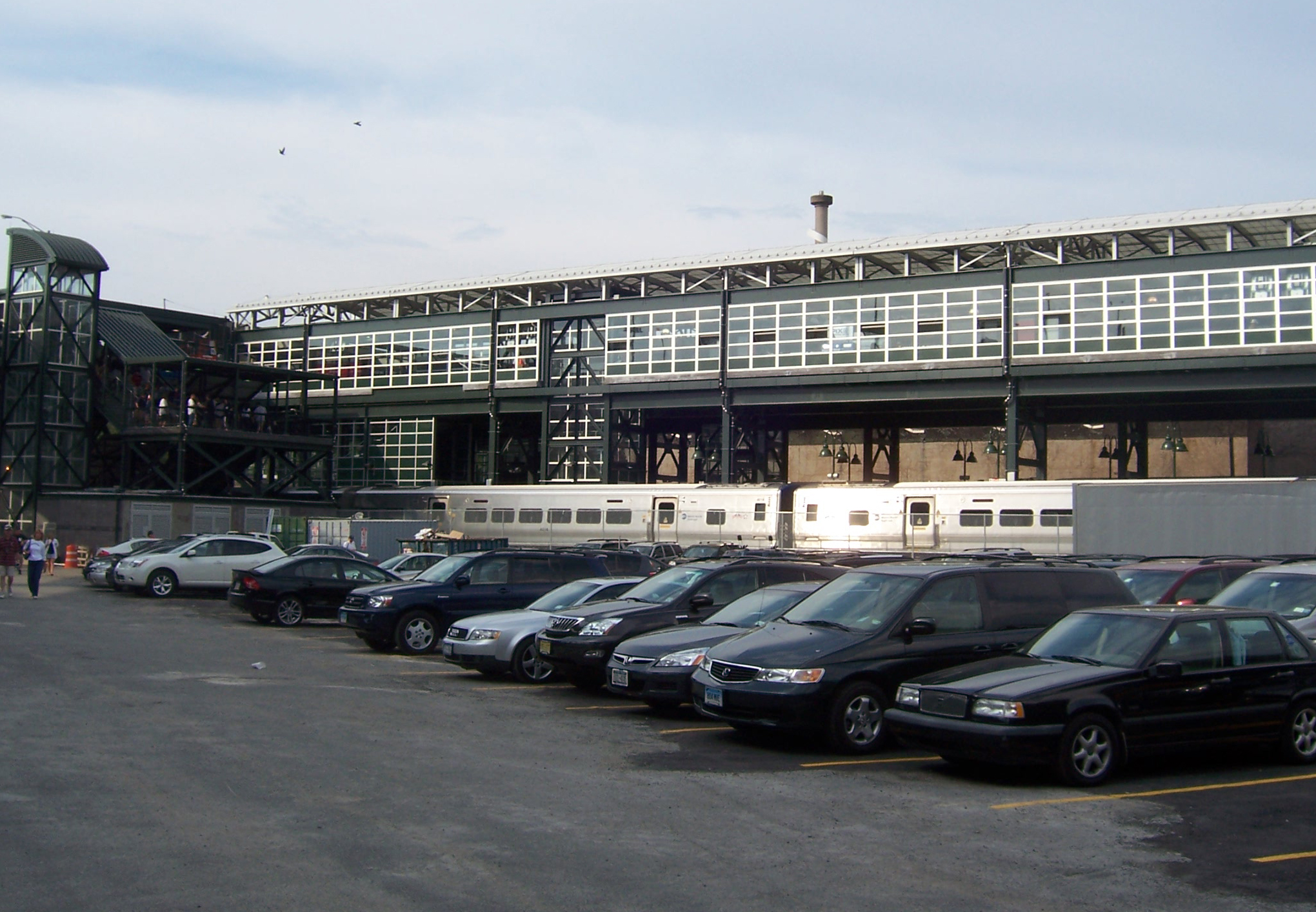
Commuter railroad service is provided by the East 153rd Street Metro-North Railroad station.

The stadium is reachable via the New York City Subway's 161st Street – Yankee Stadium station complex, the same that served the old Yankee Stadium, served by the 4, B, and D trains. It is also served by the Yankees – East 153rd Street station of the Metro-North Railroad, opened on May 23, 2009; this station routinely features Hudson Line train service, but on game days, Harlem Line and New Haven Line trains from upstate New York and Connecticut—as well as shuttle trains from Grand Central Terminal—also stop there. The stadium is also served by the Bx1, Bx2, Bx6, Bx6 SBS, and Bx13 New York City Bus routes.

Yankee Stadium is accessible by car via the Major Deegan Expressway (I-87), with connections to the Cross Bronx Expressway (I-95), Bruckner Expressway (I-278), and other highways and roads. Aside from existing parking lots and garages serving the stadium, construction for additional parking garages is planned. The New York State Legislature agreed to $70 million in subsidies for a $320 million parking garage project. On October 9, 2007, the New York City Industrial Development Agency approved $225 million in tax-exempt bonds to finance construction of three new parking garages that will have 3,600 new parking spaces, and renovation of the existing 5,569 parking spaces nearby. Plans initially called for a fourth new garage, but this was eliminated before the final approval. The garages will be built (and renovated) by the Community Initiatives Development Corporation of Hudson, a nonprofit entity that will use the parking revenue to repay the bonds and pay a $3 million yearly land lease to the City of New York. Parking is expected to cost $25 per game. To enhance security and expedite entry, Yankee Stadium implemented a clear bag policy, allowing only transparent bags of specific dimensions for easier inspection and quicker access.

== Non-baseball uses ==
=== Soccer ===
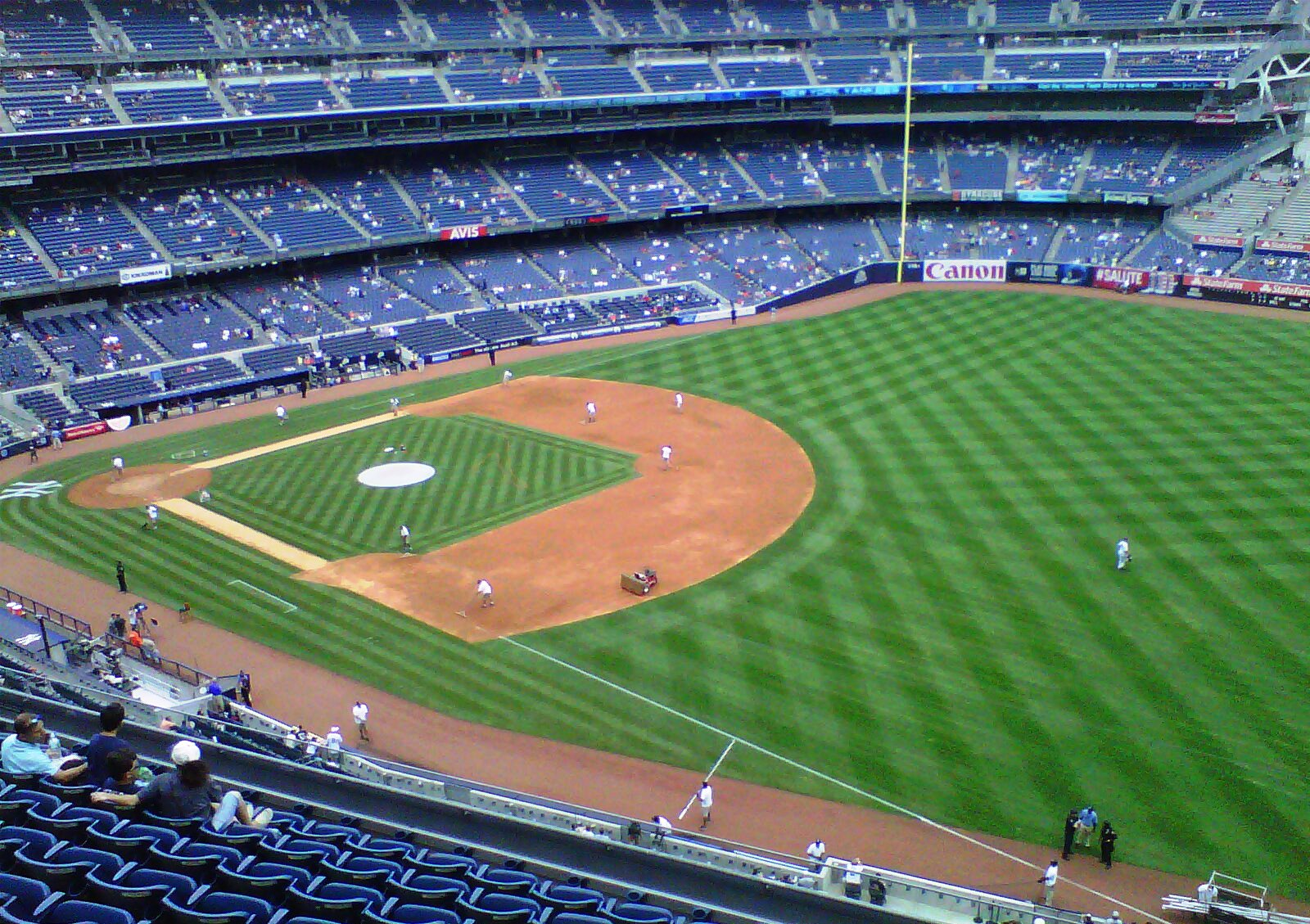
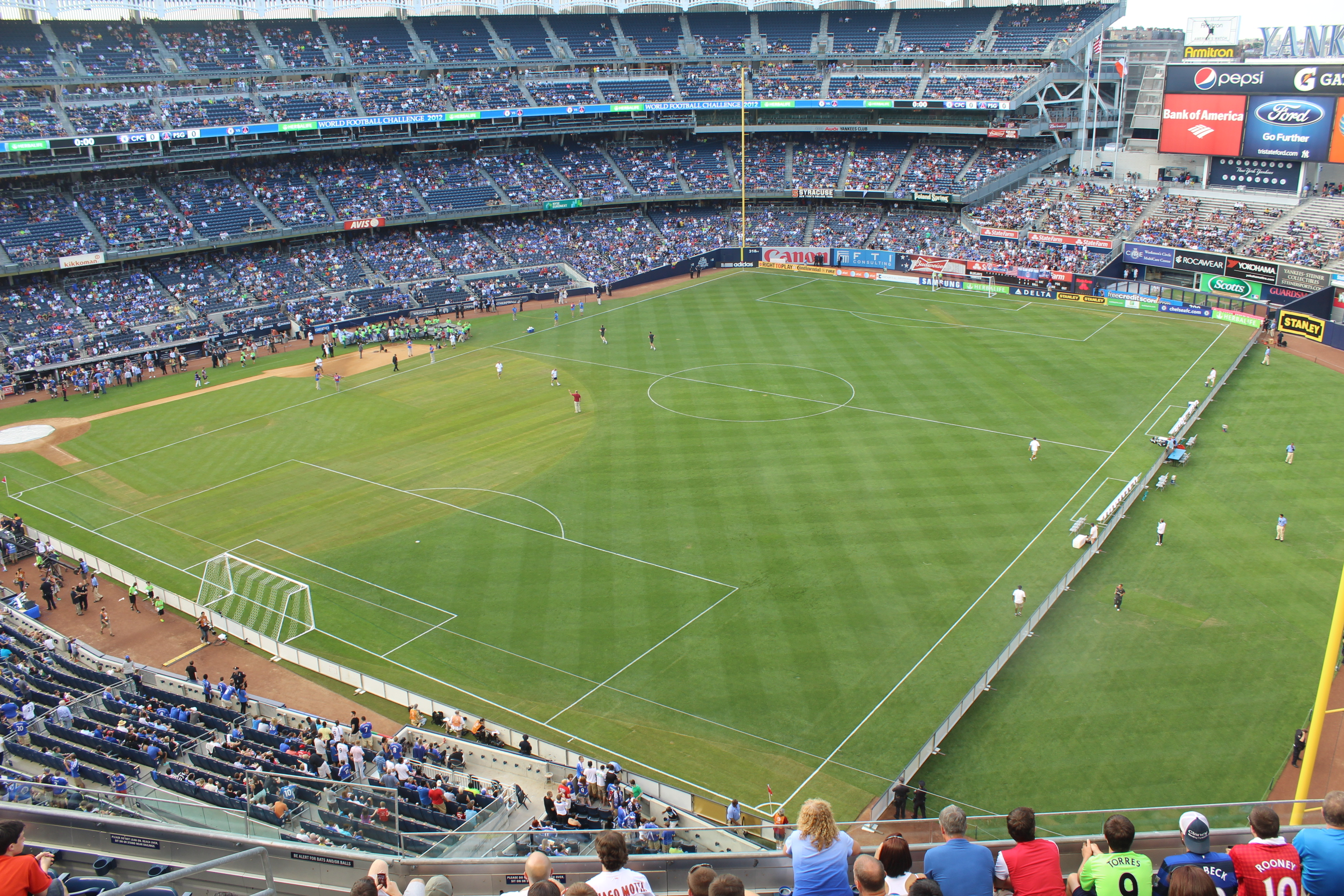
Yankee Stadium in soccer configuration (bottom), compared to its traditional baseball configuration (top).

As part of the 2012 World Football Challenge, Chelsea played Paris Saint-Germain on July 22, 2012, in the first soccer match at Yankee Stadium, the match ended in a 1–1 tie, before a crowd of 38,202. The Stadium hosted another soccer match between AC Milan and Real Madrid on August 8, 2012. Real Madrid won 5–1, before a crowd of 49,474. Chelsea also played Manchester City there on May 25, 2013, which ended in a 5–3 win for City. On June 11, 2013, Spain defeated the Republic of Ireland 2–0 in a friendly match at the stadium.

On April 21, 2014, it was announced that New York City FC, a Major League Soccer expansion team owned jointly by the New York Yankees and Manchester City, would play in Yankee Stadium from 2015 until Etihad Park is completed in 2027. NYCFC played their first game at Yankee Stadium on March 15, 2015. Because of the unique dimensions of the Yankee Stadium field, the playing surface of the soccer pitch is 110 yards (100 m) long by 70 yards (64 m) wide—the smallest field in all of Major League Soccer, and close to the smallest allowed by International Football Association Board guidelines.

Despite having soccer matches played in Yankee Stadium, it is not approved for CONCACAF matches, most notably for the CONCACAF Champions League, meaning that any CONCACAF match that has New York City FC playing in it prior to Etihad Park would be required to be played at another stadium.

NYCFC played the 150th MLS match held in Yankee Stadium on August 16, 2026.The final New York City FC game at Yankee Stadium will be on May 8, 2027 against the New York Red Bulls.

==== International soccer matches ====
Date	Team	Result	Team	Tournament	Attendance
July 22, 2012	(France) Paris Saint-Germain	1–1	(England) Chelsea	World Football Challenge	38,202
August 8, 2012	(Spain) Real Madrid	5–1	(Italy) Milan	World Football Challenge	49,474
May 25, 2013	(England) Manchester City	5–3	(England) Chelsea	Club Friendly	39,462
June 11, 2013	Spain	2–0	Republic of Ireland	International Friendly	39,368
July 30, 2014	(England) Liverpool	2–2; 3–1 (pens.)	(England) Manchester City	International Champions Cup	49,653
July 24, 2019	(England) Liverpool	2–2	(Portugal) Sporting CP	Club Friendly	31,112
September 14, 2022	(United States) New York City FC	2–0	(Mexico) Atlas F.C.	Campeones Cup	24,823
July 27, 2024	(England) Manchester City	2–3	(Italy) Milan	Club Friendly	46,122
July 29, 2026	(England) Liverpool	1–0	(Wales) Wrexham	Club Friendly	42,204

=== College football ===
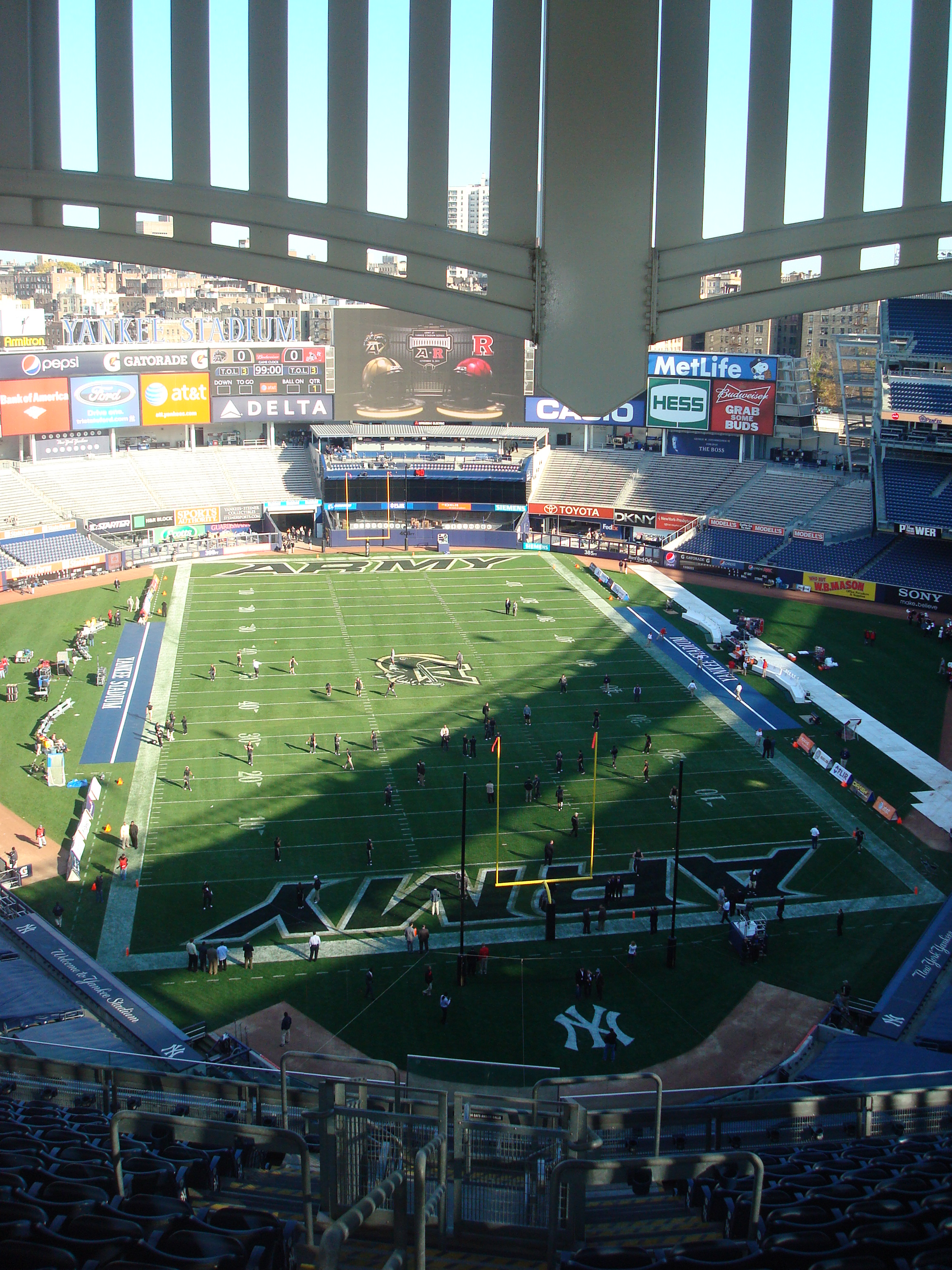
Yankee Stadium in football configuration for a game between Army and Rutgers

The Notre Dame Fighting Irish played a college football game at Yankee Stadium against The Army Black Knights on November 20, 2010, with the Irish defeating the Black Knights 27–3. This marked the two teams' first meeting in the Bronx since 1969. Army played Rutgers in 2011 (Rutgers defeated Army 27–12), and played against Connecticut in 2014. Also in 2014, Lehigh and Lafayette played the 150th edition of their college football rivalry game at Yankee Stadium on November 22, 2014. Both teams played to a sold out stadium; Lafayette winning, 27–7. On November 12, 2016, Fordham University beat Holy Cross 54–14 in the 53rd meeting of the Ram–Crusader Cup.

Since 2010, Yankee Stadium has hosted the Pinstripe Bowl, an annual college football bowl game. The inaugural bowl pitted Syracuse (3rd place Big East) against Kansas State (7th place Big 12) on December 30, 2010. Syracuse defeated Kansas State 36–34 in a shootout, before a crowd of 38,274.

The stadium was intended to host a game between Rutgers and Maryland on November 4, 2017. The game was moved back to Rutgers' home stadium due to potential conflicts with the Yankees' postseason.

Date	Winning Team	Result	Losing Team	Event	Attendance
November 20, 2010	Notre Dame	27–3	Army	Shamrock Series, rivalry	54,251
December 30, 2010	Syracuse	36–34	Kansas State	2010 Pinstripe Bowl	38,274
November 12, 2011	Rutgers	27–12	Army	Regular season	30,028
December 30, 2011	Rutgers	27–13	Iowa State	2011 Pinstripe Bowl	38,328
December 29, 2012	Syracuse	38–14	West Virginia	2012 Pinstripe Bowl	39,098
December 28, 2013	Notre Dame	29–16	Rutgers	2013 Pinstripe Bowl	47,122
November 8, 2014	Army	35–21	Connecticut	Regular season	27,453
November 22, 2014	Lafayette	27–7	Lehigh	The Rivalry	48,256
December 27, 2014	Penn State	31–30 (OT)	Boston College	2014 Pinstripe Bowl	49,012
December 26, 2015	Duke	44–41 (OT)	Indiana	2015 Pinstripe Bowl	37,218
November 12, 2016	Fordham	54–14	Holy Cross	Ram–Crusader Cup	21,375
December 28, 2016	Northwestern	31–24	#23 Pittsburgh	2016 Pinstripe Bowl	37,918
December 27, 2017	Iowa	27–20	Boston College	2017 Pinstripe Bowl	37,667
November 17, 2018	Notre Dame	36–3	Syracuse	Shamrock Series	48,104
December 27, 2018	Wisconsin	35–3	Miami (FL)	2018 Pinstripe Bowl	37,821
November 9, 2019	#13 Dartmouth	27–10	#10 Princeton	Regular season	21,506
December 27, 2019	Michigan State	27–21	Wake Forest	2019 Pinstripe Bowl	36,895
December 29, 2021	Maryland	54–10	Virginia Tech	2021 Pinstripe Bowl	29,653
November 12, 2022	Ithaca College	34–17	SUNY Cortland	Cortaca Jug	40,232
December 29, 2022	Minnesota	28–20	Syracuse	2022 Pinstripe Bowl	31,131
November 11, 2023	Syracuse	28–13	Pittsburgh	Regular season	17,101
December 28, 2023	Rutgers	31–24	Miami (FL)	2023 Pinstripe Bowl	35,314
November 23, 2024	Notre Dame	49–14	Army	Shamrock Series, rivalry	47,342
December 28, 2024	Nebraska	20–15	Boston College	2024 Pinstripe Bowl	30,062

=== Ice hockey ===
In 2014, the National Hockey League (NHL) hosted two outdoor games at Yankee Stadium known as the NHL Stadium Series, with the New Jersey Devils hosting the New York Rangers on January 26, 2014, and the New York Islanders hosting the Rangers on January 29, 2014. The Devils and Islanders had never played an outdoor game before this series. The Rangers were the designated away team in both games to maintain the tax-exempt status of their home arena, Madison Square Garden; if either the Rangers or the New York Knicks "cease playing" home games at the Garden, the venue would lose its tax exemption and be subject to penalties.

Date	Winning Team	Result	Losing Team	Event	Attendance
January 26, 2014	New York Rangers	7–3	New Jersey Devils	2014 NHL Stadium Series	50,105
January 29, 2014	New York Rangers	2–1	New York Islanders	2014 NHL Stadium Series	50,027

=== Concerts ===
Date	Artist(s)	Opening act(s)	Tour	Tickets sold	Revenue	Additional notes
September 13, 2010	Jay-Z; Eminem	B.o.B; J. Cole	The Home & Home Tour	—	—	Special guests with Eminem: D12, B.o.B, 50 Cent, Lloyd Banks and Dr. Dre. Special guests with Jay-Z: Kanye West, Nicki Minaj, Swizz Beatz, Eminem, Chris Martin of Coldplay, Drake, Beyoncé and Bridget Kelly.
September 14, 2010	Jay-Z; Eminem	B.o.B; J. Cole	The Home & Home Tour	—	—	Special guests with Eminem: D12, B.o.B, 50 Cent, G-Unit and Dr. Dre. Special guests with Jay-Z: Kanye West, Nicki Minaj, Swizz Beatz, Eminem, Mary J. Blige, Drake, Beyoncé.
July 15, 2011	Paul McCartney	DJ Chris Holmes	On the Run Tour	—	—	
July 16, 2011	Paul McCartney	DJ Chris Holmes	On the Run Tour	—	—	Special guest: Billy Joel.
September 14, 2011	Metallica; Slayer; Megadeth; Anthrax	—	Big Four Festival	41,762 / 41,762	$5,371,167	Concert by the "Big Four" of thrash metal.
July 6, 2012	Roger Waters	—	The Wall Live	62,188 / 62,188	$7,375,030	
July 7, 2012	Roger Waters	—	The Wall Live	62,188 / 62,188	$7,375,030	
September 6, 2012	Madonna	Avicii	The MDNA Tour	79,775 / 79,775	$12,599,540	The first show sold out in 20 minutes. During the second performance, Madonna performed "Holiday."
September 8, 2012	Madonna	Avicii	The MDNA Tour	79,775 / 79,775	$12,599,540	The first show sold out in 20 minutes. During the second performance, Madonna performed "Holiday."
July 19, 2013	Justin Timberlake; Jay-Z	DJ Cassidy	Legends of the Summer; Stadium Tour	89,023 / 89,023	$12,041,096	Surprise guest: Alicia Keys.
July 20, 2013	Justin Timberlake; Jay-Z	DJ Cassidy	Legends of the Summer; Stadium Tour	89,023 / 89,023	$12,041,096	Surprise guest: Timbaland.
July 11, 2014	Romeo Santos	—	Formula, Vol. 2	Sold Out both dates (total)	—	Surprise guest: Tego Calderón, Bernie Williams, Luis Vargas, Antony Santos, and Fefita La Grande.
July 12, 2014	Romeo Santos	—	Formula, Vol. 2	Sold Out both dates (total)	—	Surprise guest: Bernie Williams, Prince Royce, Marc Anthony and Aventura reunion.
July 8, 2016	Garth Brooks; Trisha Yearwood	—	The Garth Brooks World Tour with Trisha Yearwood	—	—	On November 10, a special showcasing the tour's shows from the ballpark aired in 4K exclusively through AT&T and DirecTV on Audience.
July 9, 2016	Garth Brooks; Trisha Yearwood	—	The Garth Brooks World Tour with Trisha Yearwood	—	—	On November 10, a special showcasing the tour's shows from the ballpark aired in 4K exclusively through AT&T and DirecTV on Audience.
August 27, 2022	Bad Bunny	Diplo	World's Hottest Tour	84,865 / 84,865	$22,757,636	
August 28, 2022	Bad Bunny	Diplo	World's Hottest Tour	84,865 / 84,865	$22,757,636	
August 12, 2023	Jonas Brothers	Lawrence	Five Albums. One Night. The World Tour			
August 13, 2023	Jonas Brothers	Lawrence	Five Albums. One Night. The World Tour			
July 10, 2026	Jay-Z		Jay-Z 30 Tour	136,934 / 136,934	$42,290,766	
July 11, 2026	Jay-Z		Jay-Z 30 Tour	136,934 / 136,934	$42,290,766	
July 12, 2026	Jay-Z		Jay-Z 30 Tour	136,934 / 136,934	$42,290,766	the 3rd show was delayed with late start after midnight

=== Boxing ===
The promotional tour for the Manny Pacquiao–Miguel Cotto fight began with an event at Yankee Stadium on September 10, 2009.

On June 5, 2010, Yuri Foreman fought Cotto in the first boxing match in The Bronx since 1976. The fight was referred to as the "Stadium Slugfest". Cotto defeated Foreman with a TKO in the ninth round. Cotto captured the WBA super welterweight title and his fourth world title, before a crowd of 20,272.

=== Other events ===
The first non-baseball event at the current version of Yankee Stadium took place on the evening of Saturday, April 25, 2009, when Senior Pastor Joel Osteen of Lakewood Church held what was dubbed as a "Historic Night of Hope" Christian prayer service.

A New York University graduation ceremony took place on May 13, 2009, with the address being delivered by U.S. Secretary of State and former New York Senator Hillary Clinton. The 2010 NYU ceremony featured alumnus Alec Baldwin as a speaker. President Bill Clinton spoke at the 2011 ceremony. Taylor Swift received her honorary doctorate in fine arts at the 2022 ceremony.

In 2014, Yankee Stadium became the home of the Double A and Triple A New York City High School Public School Athletic League Championship. In 2011, it became home to the PSAL Football City Conference Championship.

It served as the finish line for season 38 of The Amazing Race, which aired in fall 2025.

== Ticket policy ==
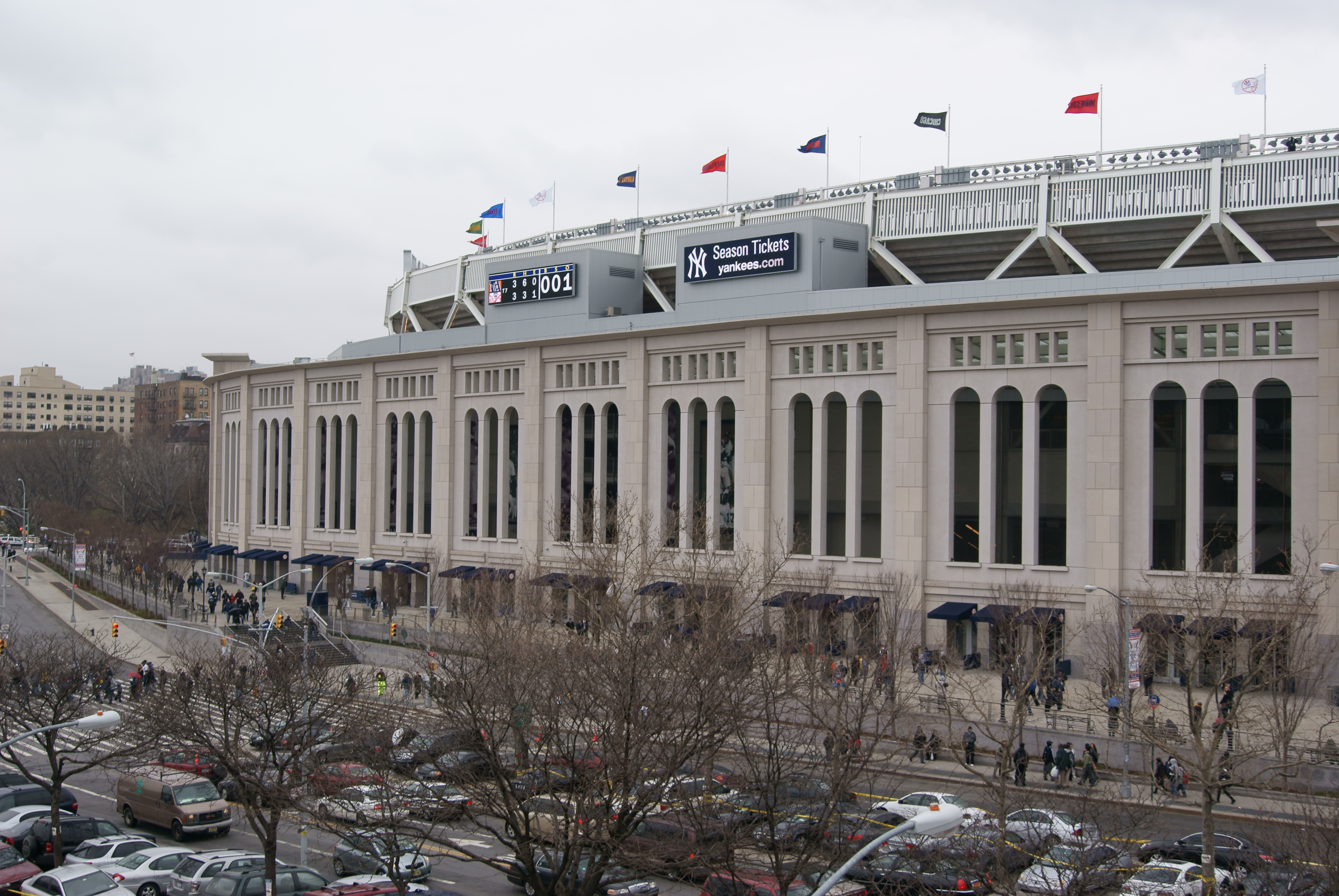
An exterior view of one of the gates through which fans can enter

Effective 2016, printed electronic tickets cannot be used at New York Yankees and New York City FC matches at Yankee Stadium. Only traditional hard-stock tickets, and those issued via a mobile ticketing system, are accepted. The team justified the decision by stating that it was meant to combat fraud associated with printed digital tickets. However, it was also believed that the team was trying to specifically hinder the ticket resale service StubHub, which competed against an official resale service run by Ticketmaster known as the Yankees Ticket Exchange. The YTE is subject to a price flooring policy, meaning that tickets may only be discounted up to a certain amount. Although StubHub was the official ticket resale partner of Major League Baseball at the time, the Yankees, as well as the Los Angeles Angels and Chicago Cubs, had opted out of this agreement.

Owing to the Yankees' ownership of the team, New York City FC announced on March 11, 2016, that its matches would also be subject to this policy. At the team's March 13, 2016 home opener, although the team stated that they would be phasing in mobile ticketing by introducing additional verification steps for printed tickets before the policy takes full effect in April, reports indicated that the stadium was turning away fans with printed tickets, leading to long queue lines, as well as few attendees inside the stadium itself. In an interview with WFAN radio, Yankees COO Lonn Trost explained that the measures were to help combat ticket resale, arguing that the team did not want fans to purchase "premium" seats at bargain prices, because they would be filled by "someone who has never sat in a premium location [before]".

On April 3, 2016, an episode of the HBO news-comedy series Last Week Tonight aired, where host John Oliver responded to Trost's remarks, arguing that he was "saying that rich people couldn't bear to sit next to people who aren't as rich." As a further satire of Trost's arguments against discounted resale, Oliver then announced a contest in which viewers were invited to send photos of themselves dressed as if they had "never sat in a premium location before", with winners offered the ability to purchase a pair of Legends Seats from one of the first three home games of the season for 25 cents. The stunt was successful, leading to the presence of several costumed attendees in Legends Seats during the opening games. Team president Randy Levine responded positively to the stunt, thanking Oliver for having bought tickets to begin with, and remarked that everyone was welcome at Yankee Stadium.

On June 27, 2016, the Yankees announced that it had reached a deal with StubHub for it to become its new official ticket resale partner beginning on July 7, 2016, and allow season ticket holders to sell electronic tickets, rather than mail physical tickets to the buyer. The service will still be subject to a price flooring policy, but the team stated that the new arrangement would provide a "superior, more secure, [and] better experience".

== Average attendances ==
Tenants	League season	Home games	Average attendance
New York City FC	2025	17	21,591
New York Yankees	2025	80	42,408
New York City FC	2024	17	23,286
New York Yankees	2024	79	41,896
New York City FC	2023	17	19,673
New York Yankees	2023	80	40,862
New York City FC	2022	16	17,129
New York Yankees	2022	78	40,207
New York City FC	2021	8	4,069
New York Yankees	2021	80	24,498
New York City FC	2020	9	—N/a (Note: No fans in attendance due to COVID-19 pandemic.)
New York Yankees	2020	30	—N/a (Note: No fans in attendance due to COVID-19 pandemic.)
New York City FC	2019	17	21,107
New York Yankees	2019	79	41,827
New York City FC	2018	17	23,211
New York Yankees	2018	81	42,998
New York City FC	2017	17	22,321
New York Yankees	2017	79	39,835
New York City FC	2016	17	27,196
New York Yankees	2016	81	37,819
New York City FC	2015	16	29,016
New York Yankees	2015	80	39,922
New York Yankees	2014	80	42,520
New York Yankees	2013	81	40,488
New York Yankees	2012	81	43,733
New York Yankees	2011	81	45,107
New York Yankees	2010	81	46,491
New York Yankees	2009	81	45,364

== Notes ==
Events and tenants
Preceded by Yankee Stadium I	Home of the New York Yankees; 2009–present	Succeeded by Current
Preceded by none	Home of the Pinstripe Bowl; 2010–present	Succeeded by Current
Preceded by first stadium	Home of New York City FC; 2015–present	Succeeded by Etihad Park
