= Quarry Yards =

Quarry Yards is a mixed-use development under construction in Atlanta, Georgia, United States. First proposed in 2018, the development would be located in the Grove Park neighborhood, next to Bankhead station, Shirley Clarke Franklin Park, and Proctor Street Greenway.

== History ==
Plans for the development were unveiled by former Major League Baseball player Mark Teixeira on February 28, 2018. Teixeira was part of a development team that also included Urban Creek Partners and Pollack Shores Real Estate Group, which announced that they would be responsible for the development's residential portions. Initial plans for the development saw it covering approximately 70 acres (28 hectares) of land near Bellwood Quarry, and would include 850 residences, a 300-room hotel, and over 500,000 square feet (46,000 m^{2}) of office space. Construction was expected to start by the end of 2018. However, by September 2018, the expected start for construction had been moved back to the second quarter of 2019. That same month, it was announced that the first phase of construction would cover 27 acres (11 hectares) at a cost of $400 million and would see the adaptive reuse of two preexisting buildings at the site. The first phase would see the creation of 50,000 square feet (4,600 m^{2}) of office space and 32,000 square feet (3,000 m^{2}) of retail. By August 2019, the expected groundbreaking had again been pushed back to November of that year.

In July 2019, the developers elicited some controversy over a brochure created for the project that showed a group of only white Americans in a conference room with "A Community Created For The New Atlanta" overlaid. The ad was criticized as a depiction of gentrification, with Atlanta mayor Keisha Lance Bottoms stating that the brochure was "poorly executed." Following the controversy, the developers revised the brochure.

On September 1, 2020, Teixeira and the developers sold the development for $127 million. Teixeira announced that the new developers would likely incorporate more affordable housing into the project. While the identity of the buyers was initially kept undisclosed, the buyers were eventually revealed to be affiliated with Microsoft but not with the Bill & Melinda Gates Foundation. Residents in the neighborhood expressed some surprise and concern over the sale and the intent of the new buyers with the property.

On February 11, 2021, Microsoft announced that they have purchased 90 acres at Quarry Yards and Quarry Hills, including committing 25% of the space to "the construction of affordable and empowered housing and other local community services and needs".
