= List of Silver Slugger Award winners at first base =

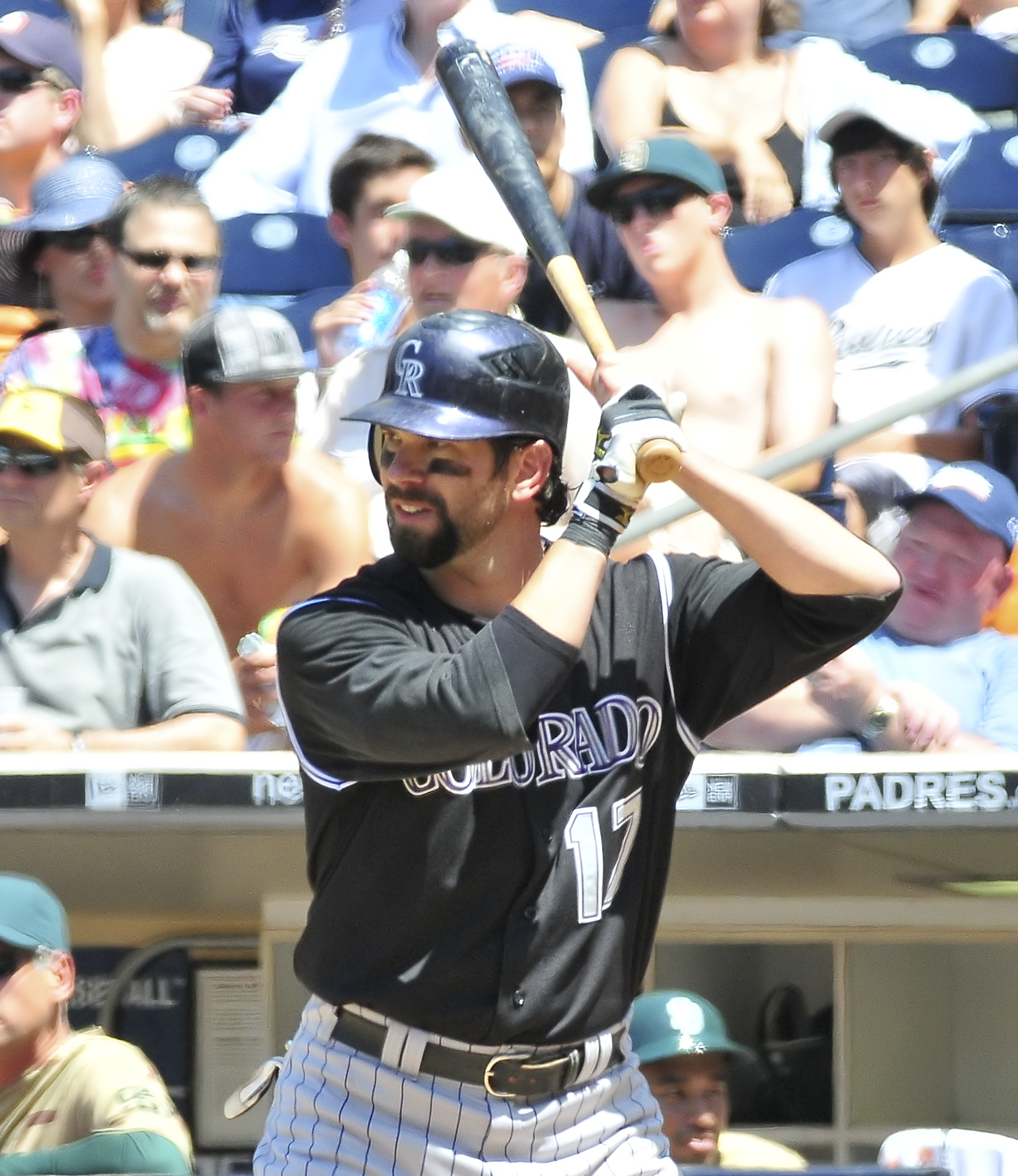
Todd Helton is the only first baseman to win four Silver Slugger Awards consecutively. He was the first of three players to win the award four times.

The Silver Slugger Award is awarded annually to the best offensive player at each position in both the American League (AL) and the National League (NL), as determined by the coaches and managers of Major League Baseball (MLB). These voters consider several offensive categories in selecting the winners, including batting average, slugging percentage, and on-base percentage, in addition to "coaches' and managers' general impressions of a player's overall offensive value". Managers and coaches are not permitted to vote for players on their own team. The Silver Slugger was first awarded in 1980 and is given by Hillerich & Bradsby, the manufacturer of Louisville Slugger bats. The award is a bat-shaped trophy, 3 feet (91 cm) tall, engraved with the names of each of the winners from the league and plated with sterling silver.

Among first basemen, Paul Goldschmidt has won the most Silver Sluggers, with five. Goldschmidt won the award in 2013, 2015, 2017, 2018 (Arizona Diamondbacks) and 2022 (St. Louis Cardinals). Tied for second are Todd Helton (Colorado Rockies; 2000–2003) and Albert Pujols (St. Louis Cardinals; 2004, 2008–2010) with four. In the American League, six players have won the award three times: José Abreu (Chicago White Sox; 2014, 2018, 2020), Miguel Cabrera (Detroit Tigers; 2010, 2015, 2016) Cecil Cooper (Milwaukee Brewers;^{[a]} 1980–1982); Carlos Delgado (Toronto Blue Jays; 1999–2000, 2003), Don Mattingly (New York Yankees; 1985–1987); and Mark Teixeira (Texas Rangers, 2004–2005; New York Yankees, 2009). In the National League, two players have won the award three times: Jeff Bagwell (Houston Astros^{[b]}; 1994, 1997, 1999); and Freddie Freeman (Atlanta Braves; 2019–2021). Mark McGwire and Eddie Murray each won a combined three Silver Slugger Awards across both leagues. McGwire won two American League Silver Sluggers for the Oakland Athletics in 1992 and 1996, and the National League Silver Slugger for the St. Louis Cardinals in 1998. Murray won two American League Silver Sluggers for the Baltimore Orioles in 1983 and 1984, and the National League Silver Slugger for the Los Angeles Dodgers in 1990. One player has won the award while playing for two different teams during his winning season. Fred McGriff was traded by the San Diego Padres to the Atlanta Braves during the 1993 season; he won the Silver Slugger Award with a .291 batting average and 37 home runs between the two teams. One father-son combination has won the award: Cecil Fielder won the American League Silver Slugger with the Detroit Tigers in 1990 and 1991, and his son Prince Fielder won the National League award with the Milwaukee Brewers in 2007 and 2011, and the American League award with the Tigers in 2012. Matt Olson and Pete Alonso are the most recent winners. In 2024, Bryce Harper won a Silver Slugger at first base, his first award at that position after two previous wins as an outfielder and one as a designated hitter.

Helton holds the record for the highest batting average in a first baseman's Silver Slugger-winning season with the .372 mark he set in 2000. In the American League, Frank Thomas' .353 batting average in 1994 ranks first, and is the third-best in the history of the award. Mark McGwire holds the records in both leagues for highest slugging percentage, and the National League record for most home runs. McGwire slugged .730 for the Oakland Athletics in 1996, the year before he was traded to the St. Louis Cardinals. In 1998, McGwire hit 70 home runs on his way to the Major League home run record, slugging .752 while battling the entire season with Sammy Sosa. Chris Davis holds the American League record for most home runs in a Silver Slugger season when he hit 53 in 2013. Andrés Galarraga had 150 runs batted in (RBI) in 1996 when he won the award, followed closely by Ryan Howard's 2006 total of 149. The American League record for a Silver Slugger winner is 145 RBI, achieved by Mattingly (1985) and Delgado (2003).

== Key ==
Year	Links to the corresponding Major League Baseball season
AVG	Batting average
OBP	On-base percentage
SLG	Slugging percentage
HR	Home runs
RBI	Runs batted in
Ref	References
* or **	Winner of the most Silver Slugger Awards at his position (** indicates tie)
†	Member of the National Baseball Hall of Fame and Museum

== American League winners ==
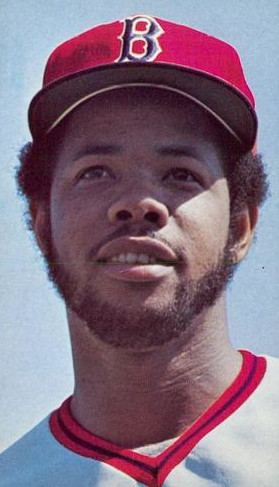
Cecil Cooper was the first player to win the Silver Slugger Award at first base three times consecutively.

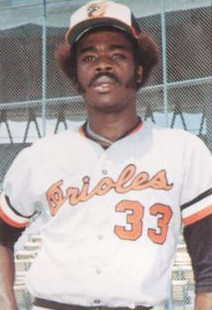
Eddie Murray was the first player to win the Silver Slugger Award at first base in both leagues.

Year	Player	Team	AVG	OBP	SLG	HR	RBI	Ref
1980	Cecil Cooper	Milwaukee Brewers	.352	.387	.539	25	122	
1981	Cecil Cooper (2)	Milwaukee Brewers	.320	.363	.495	12	60	
1982	Cecil Cooper (3)	Milwaukee Brewers	.313	.342	.528	32	121	
1983	Eddie Murray^{†}	Baltimore Orioles	.306	.393	.538	33	111	
1984	Eddie Murray^{†} (2)	Baltimore Orioles	.306	.410	.509	29	110	
1985	Don Mattingly	New York Yankees	.324	.371	.567	35	145	
1986	Don Mattingly (2)	New York Yankees	.352	.394	.573	31	113	
1987	Don Mattingly (3)	New York Yankees	.327	.378	.559	30	115	
1988	George Brett^{†}	Kansas City Royals	.306	.389	.509	24	103	
1989	Fred McGriff^{†}	Toronto Blue Jays	.269	.399	.525	36	92	
1990	Cecil Fielder	Detroit Tigers	.277	.377	.592	51	132	
1991	Cecil Fielder (2)	Detroit Tigers	.261	.347	.513	44	133	
1992	Mark McGwire	Oakland Athletics	.268	.385	.585	42	104	
1993	Frank Thomas^{†}	Chicago White Sox	.317	.426	.607	41	128	
1994	Frank Thomas^{†} (2)	Chicago White Sox	.353	.487	.729	38	101	
1995	Mo Vaughn	Boston Red Sox	.300	.388	.575	39	126	
1996	Mark McGwire (2)	Oakland Athletics	.312	.467	.730	52	113	
1997	Tino Martinez	New York Yankees	.296	.371	.577	44	141	
1998	Rafael Palmeiro	Baltimore Orioles	.296	.379	.565	43	121	
1999	Carlos Delgado	Toronto Blue Jays	.272	.377	.571	44	134	
2000	Carlos Delgado (2)	Toronto Blue Jays	.344	.470	.664	41	137	
2001	Jason Giambi	Oakland Athletics	.342	.477	.660	38	120	
2002	Jason Giambi (2)	New York Yankees	.314	.435	.598	41	122	
2003	Carlos Delgado (3)	Toronto Blue Jays	.302	.426	.593	42	145	
2004	Mark Teixeira	Texas Rangers	.281	.370	.560	38	112	
2005	Mark Teixeira (2)	Texas Rangers	.301	.379	.575	43	144	
2006	Justin Morneau	Minnesota Twins	.321	.375	.559	34	130	
2007	Carlos Peña	Tampa Bay Devil Rays	.282	.411	.627	46	121	
2008	Justin Morneau (2)	Minnesota Twins	.300	.374	.499	23	129	
2009	Mark Teixeira (3)	New York Yankees	.292	.383	.565	39	122	
2010	Miguel Cabrera	Detroit Tigers	.328	.420	.622	38	126	
2011	Adrián González	Boston Red Sox	.338	.410	.548	27	117	
2012	Prince Fielder (3)	Detroit Tigers	.313	.412	.528	30	108	
2013	Chris Davis	Baltimore Orioles	.286	.370	.634	53	138	
2014	José Abreu	Chicago White Sox	.317	.383	.581	36	107	
2015	Miguel Cabrera (2)	Detroit Tigers	.338	.440	.534	18	76	
2016	Miguel Cabrera (3)	Detroit Tigers	.316	.393	.563	38	108	
2017	Eric Hosmer	Kansas City Royals	.318	.385	.498	25	94	
2018	José Abreu (2)	Chicago White Sox	.265	.325	.473	22	78	
2019	Carlos Santana	Cleveland Indians	.281	.397	.515	34	93	
2020	José Abreu (3)	Chicago White Sox	.317	.370	.617	19	60	
2021	Vladimir Guerrero Jr.	Toronto Blue Jays	.311	.401	.601	48	111	
2022	Nathaniel Lowe	Texas Rangers	.302	.358	.492	27	76	
2023	Yandy Díaz	Tampa Bay Rays	.330	.410	.522	22	78	
2024	Vladimir Guerrero Jr. (2)	Toronto Blue Jays	.323	.396	.544	30	103	
2025	Nick Kurtz	Athletics	.290	.383	.619	36	86	
2026	Pete Alonso (2)	Baltimore Orioles	.267	.363	.522	43	113	

== National League winners ==
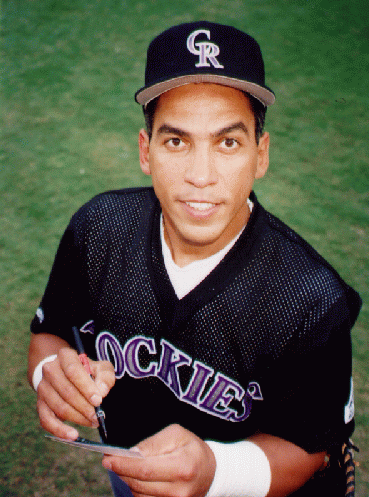
Andrés Galarraga won the Silver Slugger Award at first base in 1988 and 1996, the longest gap between awards at the position.

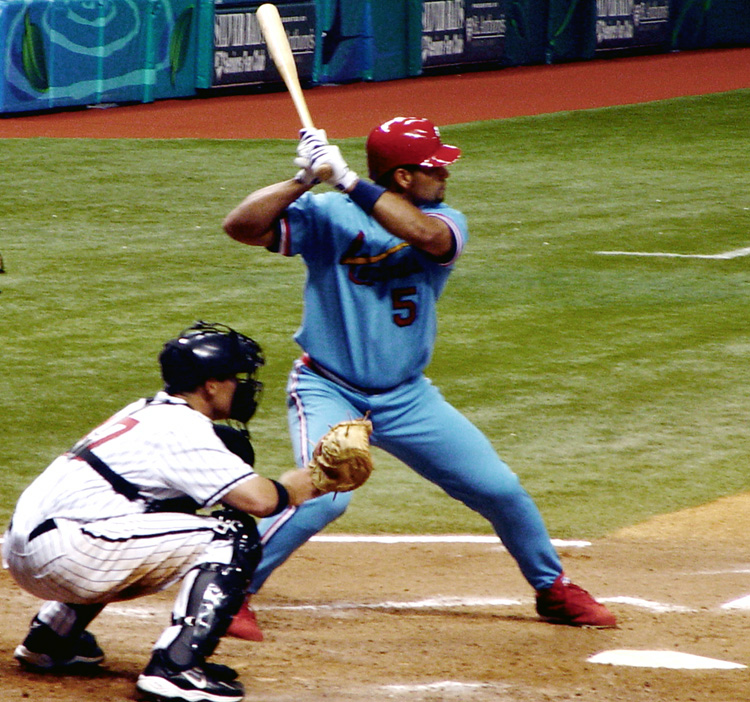
Albert Pujols won the NL Silver Slugger Award at first base in 2004, 2008, 2009, and 2010 after two previous wins at other positions.

Year	Player	Team	AVG	OBP	SLG	HR	RBI	Ref
1980	Keith Hernandez	St. Louis Cardinals	.321	.408	.494	16	99	
1981	Pete Rose	Philadelphia Phillies	.325	.391	.390	0	33	
1982	Al Oliver	Montreal Expos	.331	.392	.514	22	109	
1983	George Hendrick	St. Louis Cardinals	.318	.373	.493	18	97	
1984	Keith Hernandez (2)	New York Mets	.311	.409	.449	15	94	
1985	Jack Clark	St. Louis Cardinals	.281	.393	.502	22	87	
1986	Glenn Davis	Houston Astros	.265	.344	.493	31	101	
1987	Jack Clark (2)	St. Louis Cardinals	.286	.459	.597	35	106	
1988	Andrés Galarraga	Montreal Expos	.302	.352	.540	29	92	
1989	Will Clark	San Francisco Giants	.333	.407	.546	23	111	
1990	Eddie Murray^{†} (3)	Los Angeles Dodgers	.330	.414	.520	26	95	
1991	Will Clark (2)	San Francisco Giants	.301	.359	.536	29	116	
1992	Fred McGriff^{†} (2)	San Diego Padres	.286	.394	.556	35	104	
1993	Fred McGriff^{†} (3)	San Diego Padres; Atlanta Braves	.291	.375	.549	37	101	
1994	Jeff Bagwell^{†}	Houston Astros	.368	.451	.750	39	116	
1995	Eric Karros	Los Angeles Dodgers	.298	.369	.535	32	105	
1996	Andrés Galarraga (2)	Colorado Rockies	.304	.357	.601	47	150	
1997	Jeff Bagwell^{†} (2)	Houston Astros	.286	.425	.592	43	135	
1998	Mark McGwire (3)	St. Louis Cardinals	.299	.470	.752	70	147	
1999	Jeff Bagwell^{†} (3)	Houston Astros	.304	.454	.591	42	126	
2000	Todd Helton^{†}	Colorado Rockies	.372	.463	.698	42	147	
2001	Todd Helton^{†} (2)	Colorado Rockies	.336	.432	.685	49	146	
2002	Todd Helton^{†} (3)	Colorado Rockies	.329	.429	.577	30	109	
2003	Todd Helton^{†} (4)	Colorado Rockies	.358	.458	.630	33	117	
2004	Albert Pujols	St. Louis Cardinals	.331	.415	.657	46	123	
2005	Derrek Lee	Chicago Cubs	.335	.418	.662	46	107	
2006	Ryan Howard	Philadelphia Phillies	.313	.425	.659	58	149	
2007	Prince Fielder	Milwaukee Brewers	.288	.395	.618	50	119	
2008	Albert Pujols (2)	St. Louis Cardinals	.357	.462	.653	37	116	
2009	Albert Pujols (3)	St. Louis Cardinals	.327	.443	.658	47	135	
2010	Albert Pujols (4)	St. Louis Cardinals	.312	.414	.596	42	118	
2011	Prince Fielder (2)	Milwaukee Brewers	.299	.415	.566	38	120	
2012	Adam LaRoche	Washington Nationals	.271	.343	.510	33	100	
2013	Paul Goldschmidt*	Arizona Diamondbacks	.302	.401	.551	36	125	
2014	Adrián González (2)	Los Angeles Dodgers	.276	.335	.482	27	116	
2015	Paul Goldschmidt* (2)	Arizona Diamondbacks	.321	.435	.570	33	110	
2016	Anthony Rizzo	Chicago Cubs	.292	.385	.544	32	109	
2017	Paul Goldschmidt* (3)	Arizona Diamondbacks	.297	.404	.563	36	120	
2018	Paul Goldschmidt* (4)	Arizona Diamondbacks	.290	.389	.533	33	83	
2019	Freddie Freeman	Atlanta Braves	.295	.389	.549	38	121	
2020	Freddie Freeman (2)	Atlanta Braves	.341	.462	.640	13	53	
2021	Freddie Freeman (3)	Atlanta Braves	.300	.393	.503	31	83	
2022	Paul Goldschmidt* (5)	St. Louis Cardinals	.317	.404	.578	35	115	
2023	Matt Olson	Atlanta Braves	.283	.389	.604	54	139	
2024	Bryce Harper	Philadelphia Phillies	.285	.373	.525	30	87	
2025	Pete Alonso	New York Mets	.272	.347	.524	38	126	
2026	Matt Olson (2)	Atlanta Braves	.251	.321	.502	41	93	

== Footnotes ==
- ^{a} The Brewers were members of the American League until 1997 when Commissioner Bud Selig offered the team the option to switch leagues due to a realignment of Major League Baseball's divisions. The Brewers have been members of the National League since 1998.
- ^{b} The Astros were members of the National League until 2012 when the team moved from the National League Central to the American League West in order to balance out the divisions. The Astros have been members of the American League since 2013.

== See also ==
- List of Gold Glove Award winners at first base
