= Grove Park, Atlanta =

Neighborhood of Atlanta, Georgia

Coordinates: 33.772984°N 84.446848°W

Grove Park marker

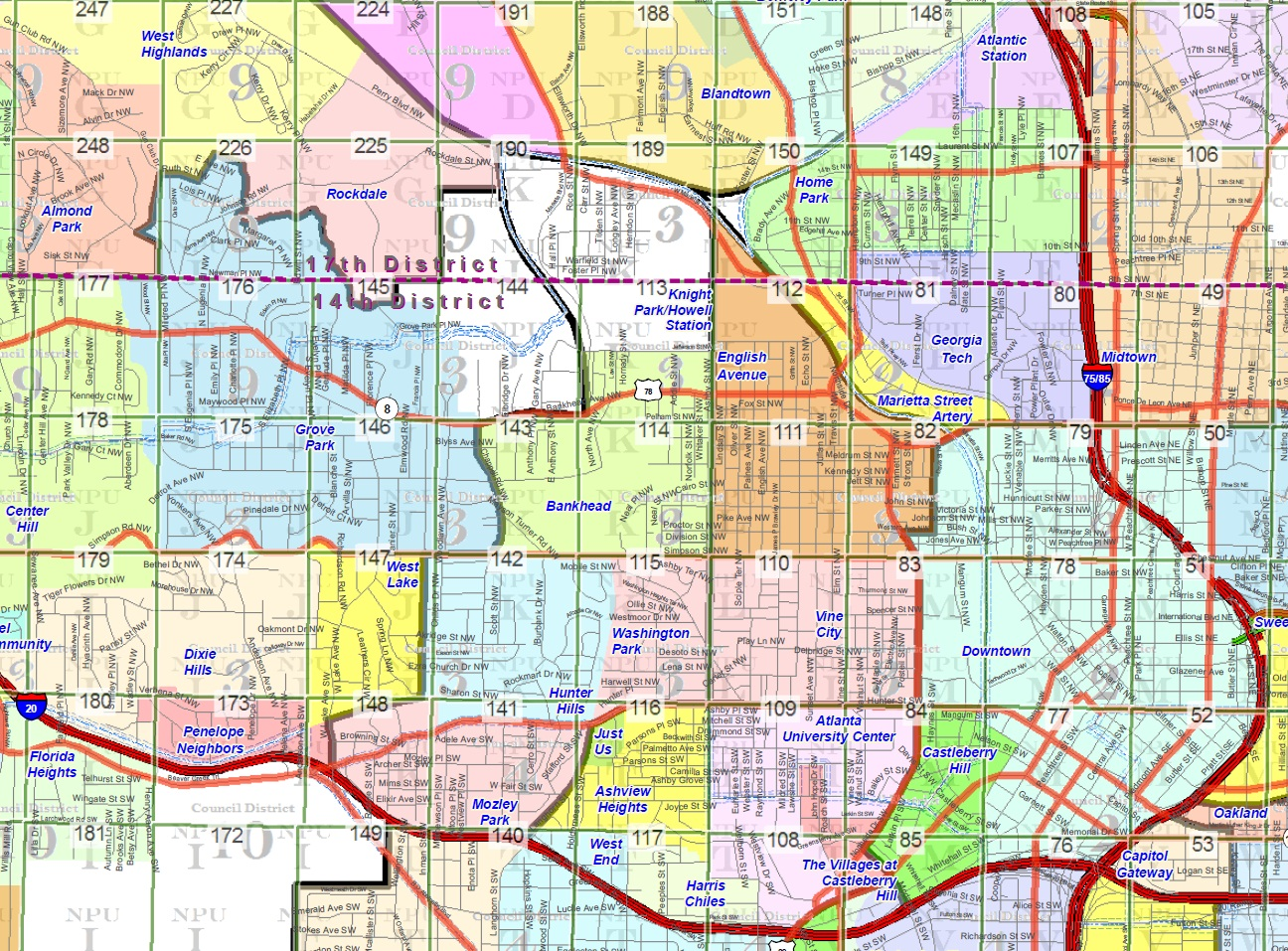
Grove Park (light blue, upper left) in northwest Atlanta

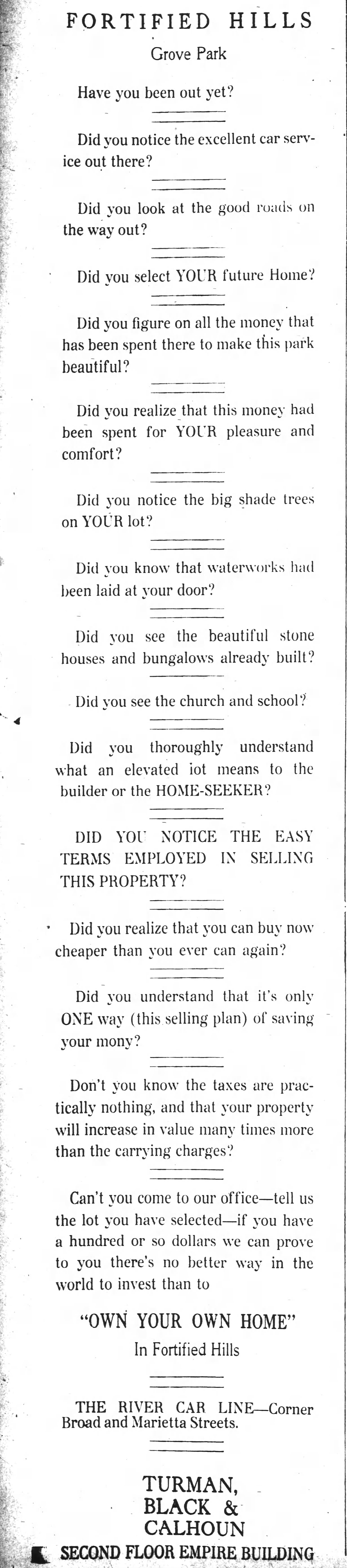
1913 ad in the Atlanta Constitution for land sales in Fortified Hills

Grove Park is a historic neighborhood in northwest Atlanta, Georgia, inside the perimeter and bounded by:

- Center Hill on the west
- Dixie Hills, West Lake, and Hunter Hills on the south
- Bankhead on the east
- Almond Park, West Highlands, and Rockdale to the north.

== History ==
Grove Park was named for Dr. Edwin Wiley Grove, president of the Grove Park Development Company, a pharmaceutical magnate who also built Atkins Park near Virginia-Highland in northeast Atlanta, and many Asheville, North Carolina hotels including the Grove Park Inn. Grove Park was developed in the 1920s and 1930s by various developers, but primarily by the Grove Park Development Company. The community was initially known as Fortified Hills, a name stemming from the Civil War. Grove named the streets for his second wife, Gertrude, his daughter Evelyn (from his first wife, Mary Louisa Moore Grove), and his son, Edwin (begat from Gertrude). Other street names are believed to have been inspired by his grandchildren: Matilda, Hortense, Emily, Elizabeth, Francis, Eleanor, Florence, Margaret, and Eugenia. Many of the side streets created in the 1930s, 1940s and 1950s are wide, tree-lined avenues with well-tended frame cottages, brick Tudors, and ranches.

Grove Park and Center Hill were both developed during the early part of the 20th century. Prior to 1960 Grove Park and Center Hill were all-white communities. African-Americans began to move into these areas during the 1960s, primarily as an offshoot of growth in the Collier Heights neighborhood. Collier Heights was developed in earnest in the late 1950s and early 1960s as a public-private effort with African Americans handling most of the "hammers and cash." The City of Atlanta published its "Neighborhood Plan for Collier Heights" in 1961. The neighborhood would accommodate 7,000 residents and help solve the shortage of quality homes for African Americans.

Donald Lee Hollowell Parkway, one of the major corridors in Northwest Atlanta, was in its splendor during the 1960s, and the area was stable until the early 1970s when suburban growth began to drain the area's vitality. As a result, many longtime businesses closed and were replaced by low-rent business; and as population decreased the area began to deteriorate. In fact, through the turn of the 21st century, the entire area witnessed a steady decline in population, property conditions, and the local economy.

However, conditions in the area have changed over the past few years as the current trend towards in-town living gains popularity. Neighborhoods throughout the City and especially Northwest Atlanta are experiencing a resurgence of development including new infill residential units and subdivisions as well as major renovations. Grove Park and the Donald Lee Hollowell Parkway Corridor are poised to experience some of this resurgence. The Grove Park area has been dramatically affected by the nation's foreclosure crisis. However, real estate investors expect the proposed development plans to spur the neighborhood's revitalization.

In 2018, Mark Teixeira and a development team announced plans to build a 70 acres (28 hectares) mixed-use development in the neighborhood called Quarry Yards, adjacent to the planned Shirley Clarke Franklin Park.

In September 2020 the planned mixed-use development Quarry Yards was sold to a undisclosed buyer. In February 2021, Microsoft President Brad Smith announced at a news conference, with Mayor Keisha Lance Bottoms and Gov. Brian Kemp, that the tech company was making a long-term commitment to Atlanta, including the 90-acre campus at Quarry Yards in the Grove Park neighborhood. This Grove Park campus was projected to be the second-largest Microsoft campus in the world with over 15,000 employees once fully complete. However, Microsoft never broke ground and in February 2023 announced the project was paused indefinitely after eliminating 10,000 jobs, making changes to its hardware portfolio, and consolidating leases. Also in February 2023, Microsoft stated the land is not for sale and still planned to start using 25% of the 90 acres for community needs as initially promised. Grove Park's property values and sales significantly increased with the 2021 Microsoft announcement, so the indefinite pause left many Grove Park homeowners concerned about the trajectory of the neighborhood and the future status of the land purchased by Microsoft. In November 2025, Microsoft announced it will transfer 22.5 acres of the property to the city for more affordable housing.

== Demographics ==
The population in 2000 was 6,410. The neighborhood is more than 95% African American. Median household income in 2009 was $31,073 versus $49,981 for the city of Atlanta as a whole.

== Notable residents ==
Grove Park is the original home of Andre 3000, and Cleveland Browns Pro Bowl halfback Jamal Lewis.

== Parks ==
Grove Park falls on the western edge of the BeltLine. On the northeastern boundary of Grove Park is the Shirley Clarke Franklin Park at Bellwood Quarry which is the largest public park in Atlanta. Amenities include tournament-quality baseball fields, a skate park and rink, hiking and mountain biking trails, an amphitheater which takes advantages of skyline views, a dog park, community gardens, and many others attractions. Additionally the neighborhood features several small pocket parks and boulevard parks including Edwin Place Park, Matilda Place Park, North and South Evelyn Place Park, Elinor Place Park, and finally the neighborhood namesake park, Grove Park itself.

Grove Park is also home to the Proctor Creek Greenway Trail. The multi-purpose trail strings together more than 400 acres of greenspace, spanning from Maddox Park along the Beltline Westside Trail all the way to the Chattahoochee River. The first phase of the project included more than two miles of trails, connecting Bankhead MARTA Station to the existing River Park Trail, connecting to the Westside Quarry Park. Ultimately, plans call for work on the entire trail to be completed in six segments, according to a master plan finished in April 2017.

== Transportation ==
Grove Park is located along Hollowell Parkway (US Highway 278). Grove Park is also served by MARTA buses that transport riders to the West Lake MARTA station and the Bankhead MARTA station.

== Education ==
The schools that serve the neighborhood are Woodson Park Academy, John Lewis Invictus Academy, and Frederick Douglass High School.
