= Proctor Street Greenway =

Trail in Atlanta, Georgia

Proctor Creek Greenway is a trail in northwest Atlanta. The trail will connect 400 acres (160 ha) of green space, from Maddox Park near Bankhead MARTA station, passing the Westside Reservoir Park, to the River Trail Park in the far northwest of the city.

The trail is anticipated to be around seven total miles in length. The first three miles opened in May 2018. The construction cost is around 4 million U.S. dollars.

== See also ==
- Cycling infrastructure
