= Mark Teixeira =

American baseball player and politician (born 1980)

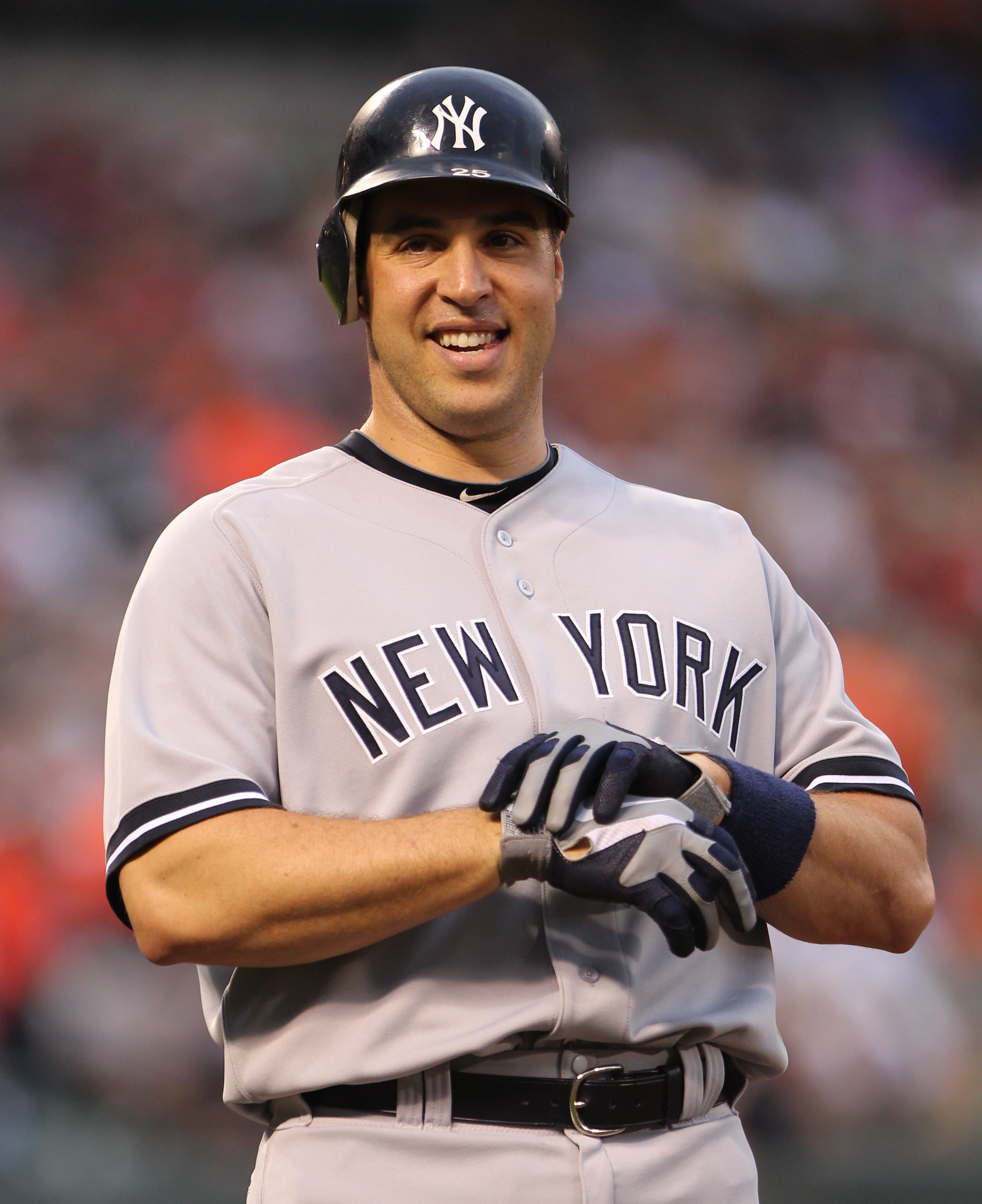
- Teixeira with the New York Yankees in 2011

Member-elect of the U.S. House of Representatives from Texas's 21st district
- Assuming office January 3, 2027
- Succeeding: Chip Roy

Personal details
- Born: Mark Charles Teixeira; April 11, 1980 (age 46) Annapolis, Maryland, U.S.
- Party: Republican
- Spouse: Leigh Williams
- Children: 3
- Education: Georgia Institute of Technology (BBA)
- Website: Campaign website
- Baseball career
- First baseman
- Batted: Switch Threw: Right

MLB debut
- April 1, 2003, for the Texas Rangers

Last MLB appearance
- October 2, 2016, for the New York Yankees

MLB statistics
- Batting average: .268
- Home runs: 409
- Runs batted in: 1,298
- Stats at Baseball Reference

Teams
- Texas Rangers (2003–2007); Atlanta Braves (2007–2008); Los Angeles Angels of Anaheim (2008); New York Yankees (2009–2016)

Career highlights and awards
- 3× All-Star (2005, 2009, 2015); World Series champion (2009); 5× Gold Glove Award (2005, 2006, 2009, 2010, 2012); 3× Silver Slugger Award (2004, 2005, 2009); AL home run leader (2009); AL RBI leader (2009); Dick Howser Trophy (2000)

Mark Charles Teixeira (/teɪˈʃɛərə/ tay-SHAIR-ə; born April 11, 1980), nicknamed "Tex", is an American politician and former professional baseball first baseman who played 14 seasons in Major League Baseball (MLB) for the Texas Rangers, Atlanta Braves, Los Angeles Angels of Anaheim, and New York Yankees. Before his professional career, he played college baseball at Georgia Tech, where in 2000 he won the Dick Howser Trophy as the national collegiate baseball player of the year. One of the most prolific switch hitters in MLB history, Teixeira was a member of the Yankees' 27th World Series championship team in 2009, leading the American League (AL) in home runs and runs batted in (RBI) while finishing second in the Most Valuable Player Award (MVP) balloting. Teixeira was a three-time All-Star, won five Gold Glove Awards and three Silver Slugger Awards, and holds the major-league record for most games with a home run from both sides of the plate, with 14. He was the fifth switch hitter in MLB history to reach 400 home runs.

Drafted fifth overall by the Texas Rangers in 2001, Teixeira made his MLB debut on Opening Day in 2003, and hit 26 home runs as a rookie. He hit career-highs of 43 home runs and 144 RBI in 2005. The centerpiece of consecutive mid-season trades in 2007 and 2008, the Rangers first sent him to the Braves for a prospect package centered around Elvis Andrus and Matt Harrison. He was later traded in July 2008 to the Los Angeles Angels, where he played for half a season and lost in the first round of the playoffs. In December 2008, he agreed to a lucrative eight-year contract with the Yankees, contributing his most productive season with the team the following year. Injuries limited his effectiveness afterward, including a calf strain in 2012, early season-ending wrist surgery in 2013, various ailments in 2014, a shin fracture in 2015, and neck spasms and torn cartilage in 2016. Teixeira retired at the conclusion of the 2016 season and contract with the Yankees. In each season from 2004 to 2011, Teixeira hit at least 30 home runs with 100 RBI.

Teixeira is the Republican member-elect for Texas's 21st congressional district, having won in the 2026 election. He will assume office in January 2027. In his campaign, he received the support of President Donald Trump.

== Early life ==
Mark Charles Teixeira grew up in Severna Park, Maryland, the son of Margaret "Margy" Canterna and John Teixeira. He attended Mount Saint Joseph High School in Baltimore, where he played for the school's varsity baseball team, and was teammates with Gavin Floyd. His paternal grandfather was an immigrant from Guyana. Teixeira's mother was of Italian descent.

== College career ==
The Boston Red Sox selected Teixeira in the ninth round of the 1998 MLB draft. Teixeira chose not to sign with the Red Sox, however, opting instead to attend the Georgia Institute of Technology to play college baseball for the Georgia Tech Yellow Jackets, citing that he didn't appreciate how the Red Sox treated him. In the summer of 1999, he played collegiate summer baseball for the Orleans Cardinals of the Cape Cod Baseball League, where he won the league's Outstanding Pro Prospect Award. In 2000 with the Yellow Jackets, his batting average was .427, and his on-base plus slugging (OPS) was 1.319. He also won the Dick Howser Trophy as the national collegiate baseball player of the year.

== Professional career ==
=== Draft and minor leagues ===
The Texas Rangers selected Teixeira in the first round, with the fifth overall pick, of the 2001 MLB draft. The Philadelphia Phillies considered selecting him with the fourth overall pick, but the financial demands of Teixeira's agent Scott Boras swayed the Phillies to select Gavin Floyd. The Rangers signed Teixeira to a major league contract worth $9.5 million over four years.

Teixeira began the 2002 season with the Charlotte Rangers of the Class A-Advanced Florida State League, where he batted .320 with an OPS of 1.000 in 38 games. He was then moved up to the Tulsa Drillers of the Double-A Texas League, with whom he batted .316 with a .994 OPS and hit 10 home runs in 48 games.

=== Texas Rangers ===
Teixeira made the Rangers Opening Day roster out of spring training in 2003. As a rookie in 2003, Teixeira hit .259 with 26 home runs, 84 runs batted in (RBIs), and a .811 OPS.

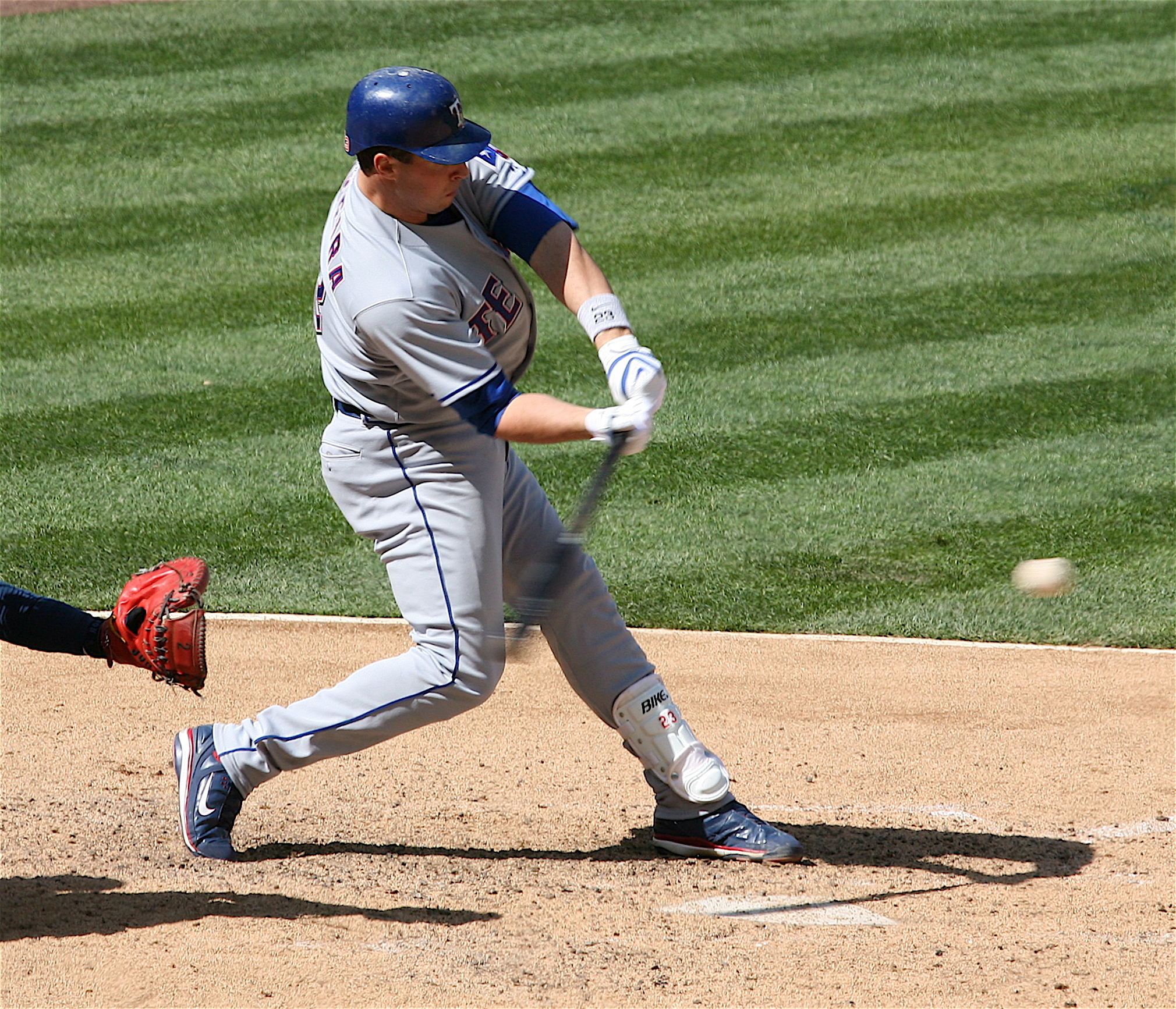
Teixeira as a member of the Rangers.

In 2004, Teixeira batted .281 with an OPS of .930, 38 home runs, and 112 RBIs. On August 17, 2004, Teixeira hit for the cycle. For his accomplishments in 2005, he earned the Silver Slugger Award as the best-hitting first baseman in the American League as well as the Gold Glove signifying his place as the best fielding first baseman in the American League. He was also named to his first All-Star Game after winning the fan voting portion of the selection to be named the starting first baseman for his league. During the game, Teixeira hit a home run from the right-hand side of the plate, something he had failed to do in the entire first half of the season. In a five-game span around the All-Star Game, Teixeira hit five home runs with 13 RBI. He finished July with 13 home runs and 30 RBI and was named the American League Player of the Month. Overall, Teixeira batted .301 with 43 home runs and 144 RBI in the 2005 season.

In 2005, Teixeira became the third switch-hitter in MLB history to hit at least 20 home runs in each of his first three seasons, after Eddie Murray and Chipper Jones. He is also one of just five players in Major League history to hit at least 100 home runs in his first three seasons, joining Hall of Famers Joe DiMaggio, Ralph Kiner, and Eddie Mathews as well as former first base star, Albert Pujols. Other players – Mark McGwire, José Canseco, Todd Helton, Ryan Howard – have hit 100+ home runs in their first three full seasons, but these players had all played partial seasons prior to playing their first three full seasons. His 2005 total of 144 RBI is a Major League record for a switch-hitter.

On Mother's Day, May 14, 2006, Teixeira was one of more than 50 hitters who brandished a pink bat to benefit the Breast Cancer Foundation. Teixeira's 2006 season began slowly, as he collected only nine home runs before the All-Star Break. After the All-Star Break, however, he was among the league's leaders in home runs, and again finished with over 30 homers and 100 RBI for the season. Teixeira agreed to a two-year $15.98 million contract before the 2006 season to avoid his first two years of arbitration. On June 9, 2007, Teixeira's franchise record 507 consecutive-game streak came to an end. Teixeira landed awkwardly at first base after running out a grounder in a game against the Milwaukee Brewers the previous day. The streak was second to Miguel Tejada at the time. The strained quadriceps muscle placed Teixeira on the disabled list for only the second time of his career.

=== Atlanta Braves ===
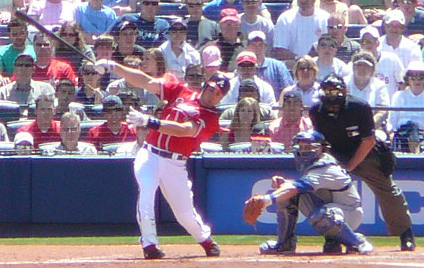
Teixeira with the Braves in 2008.

On July 31, 2007, two weeks after turning down an eight-year, $140 million contract extension from the Rangers, Teixeira was traded to the Atlanta Braves (along with left-handed reliever Ron Mahay) for catcher/first baseman Jarrod Saltalamacchia, and four prospects: shortstop Elvis Andrus, and starting pitchers Matt Harrison, Neftalí Feliz and Beau Jones. Teixeira was activated for that night's game against the Houston Astros and arrived in the dugout during the seventh inning. He was promptly shown on Turner Field's high definition video board and received a boisterous applause from the Atlanta crowd.

In his Braves debut on August 1, 2007, Teixeira hit a 3-run homer and drove in 4 runs in a 12–3 rout of the Houston Astros. Teixeira went on to homer in each of the following two games, becoming just the second player to homer in his first three games as a Brave – the first being Gary Sheffield in 2002.

On August 19, 2007, Teixeira had his first multi-HR game against the Arizona Diamondbacks off Yusmeiro Petit. He would repeat that feat the next day, going deep for two three-run home runs versus the Cincinnati Reds. Teixeira, a switch-hitter, hit both homers on the 19th batting from the left side of the plate, and hit his homers on the 20th from the right side. He was named co-NL Player of the Week from August 20–26 by slugging .793 with three home runs and as expected, he was awarded NL Player of the Month for August. On September 22, Teixeira had his first walk-off hit with the Braves when he singled in Willie Harris giving the Braves a 4–3 extra-inning victory. In 54 games with Atlanta in 2007, Teixeira batted .317 with 17 home runs and 56 RBI. The Braves avoided arbitration in the 2007 offseason and signed Teixeira to a one-year, $12.5 million contract for the 2008 season.

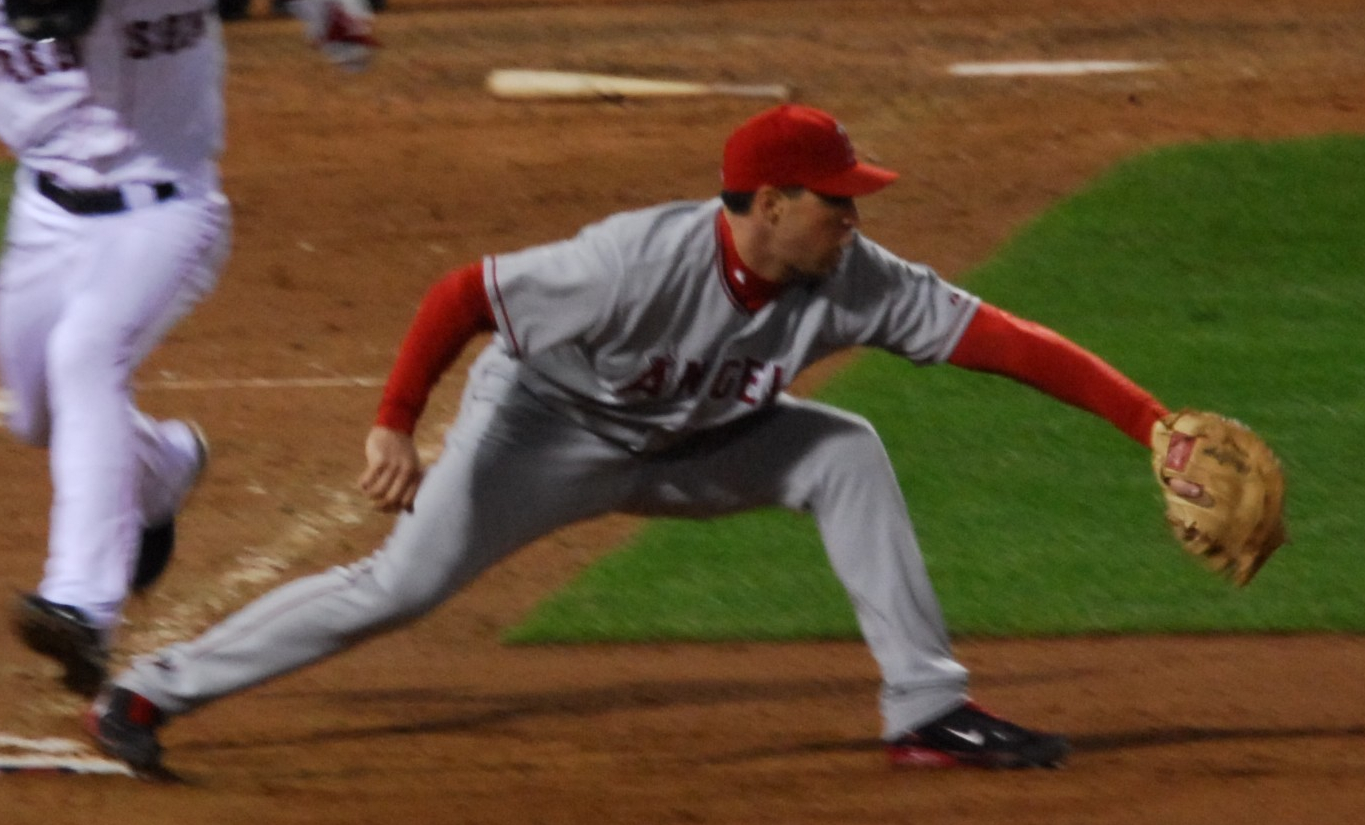
Teixeira playing for the Angels in 2008 American League Division Series Game 4 on October 6.

=== Los Angeles Angels of Anaheim ===
On July 29, 2008, Teixeira was traded to the Los Angeles Angels of Anaheim for Casey Kotchman and minor league pitcher Stephen Marek. Batting third in the Angel order, Teixeira hit .358 with 13 home runs and 43 RBIs after the trade to help his new team to their first 100-win season in franchise history. Through 2011, he was one of seven major leaguers to have had at least four 30-homer, 100-RBI seasons in their first five years, along with Chuck Klein, Joe DiMaggio, Ted Williams, Ralph Kiner, Albert Pujols, and Ryan Braun.

Teixeira made his postseason debut with a .467 batting average, 7 hits and an RBI. His new team of the Angels would lose the 2008 ALDS to the Boston Red Sox in 4 games. Teixeira declared for free agency at the end of the season.

=== New York Yankees ===
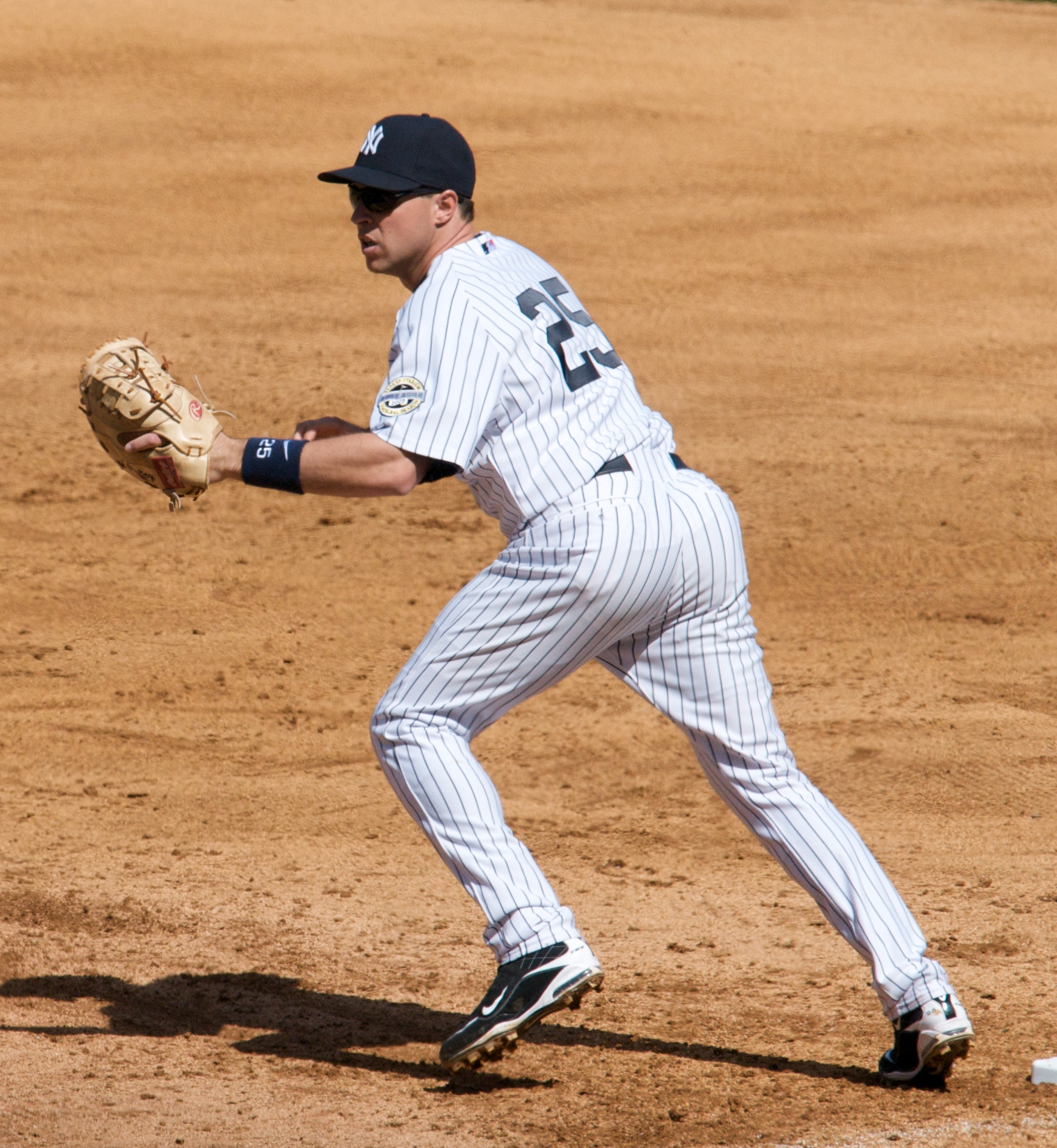
Teixeira, pictured in 2009.

==== 2009 ====
In December 2008, Teixeira agreed preliminarily to a deal with the New York Yankees worth $180 million over 8 years, and he was formally introduced as a Yankee on January 6, 2009. The contract included a full no-trade clause, plus a $5 million signing bonus. He signed with the Yankees over a number of other clubs, including the Los Angeles Angels of Anaheim, Boston Red Sox, Washington Nationals and Baltimore Orioles. The signing with the Yankees reunited Teixeira with teammate Alex Rodriguez who played for the Texas Rangers from 2001 to 2003. Teixeira wore the number 25 instead of his preferred number 23, since 23 is retired in honor of Don Mattingly. Mattingly was Teixeira's childhood idol, and was the reason Teixeira wore 23 earlier in his career. The signing became official on January 6, 2009.

In the 2009 season, he led the AL in both home runs (tied with Carlos Peña of Tampa Bay) with 39, and RBI with 122.

Teixeira received a World Series ring as the Yankees won the 2009 World Series, but struggled offensively throughout the postseason, batting only .180 overall and .136 in the World Series. However, several of his hits proved very important, including a walk-off home run in Game 2 of the ALDS and a game-tying home run in Game 2 of the World Series. Additionally, he made several stellar defensive plays in all rounds of the playoffs.

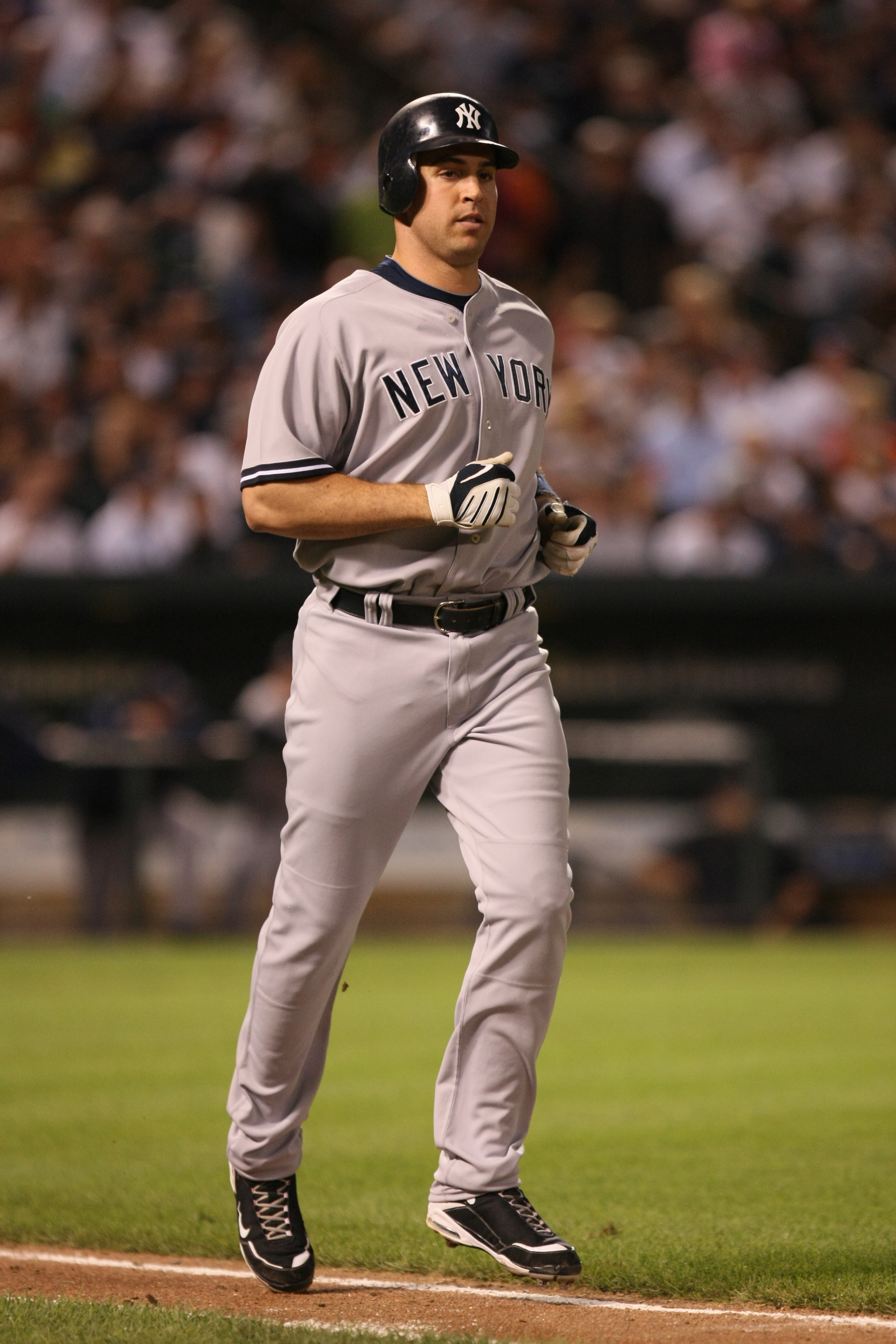
Teixeira in 2009

For the 2009 season, Teixeira was awarded both the Gold Glove and Silver Slugger awards for the American League first baseman. He also finished second in the AL MVP balloting behind Twins' catcher Joe Mauer.

==== 2010 ====
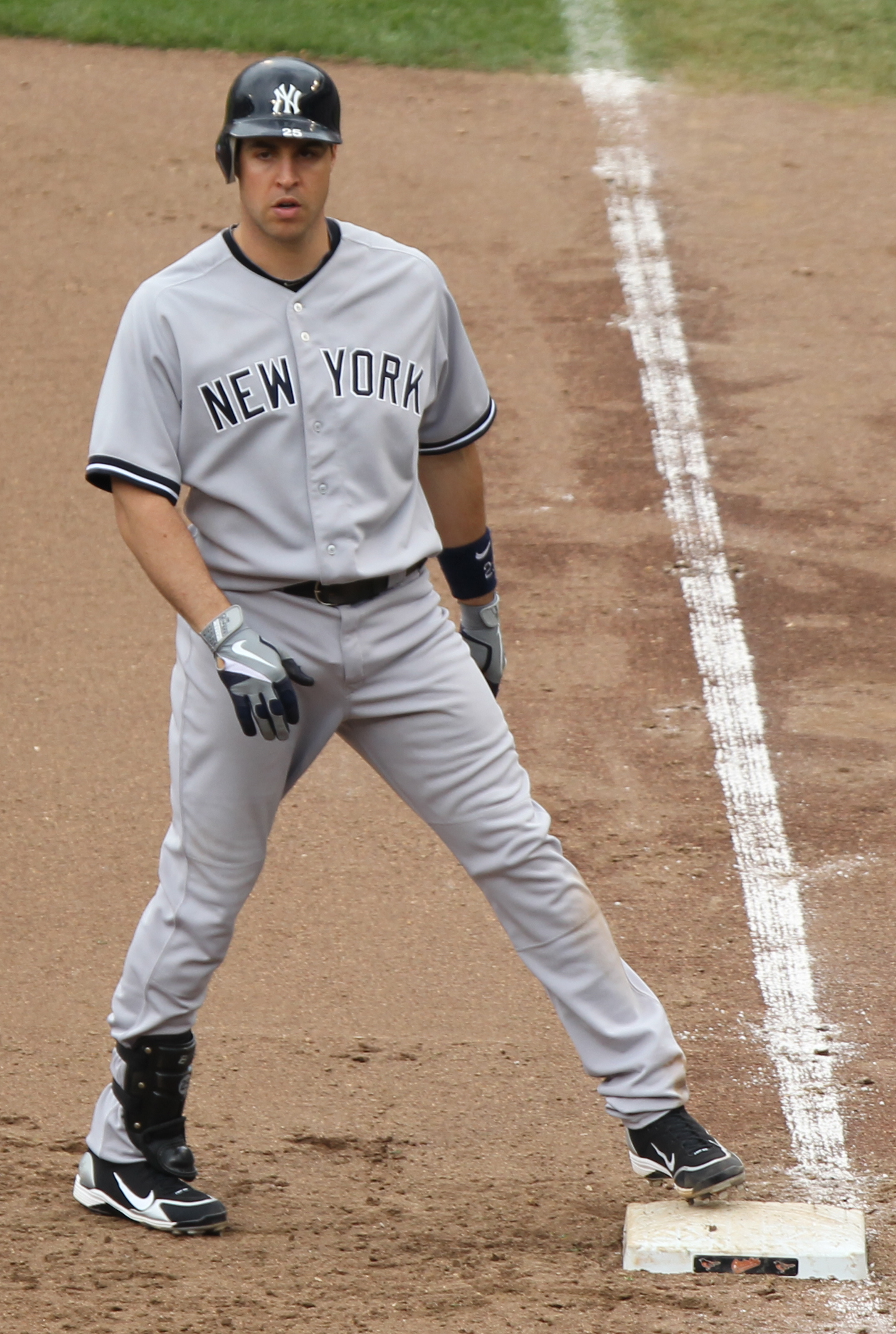
Teixeira on first base in 2011

On April 23, against the Angels, Teixeira was involved in a home-plate collision with Bobby Wilson while sliding home. Teixeira confessed that the collision was not intentional, and was not disciplined by the league for his action. On May 8, Teixeira became the second Yankees player to hit three home runs in one game against the Boston Red Sox, joining Lou Gehrig, who accomplished the feat on June 23, 1927. On June 20, against the New York Mets, Teixeira hit a grand slam off Johan Santana, proving to be the Yankees' only offense of the game in the 4–0 victory. Once again, Teixeira won the 2010 Gold Glove Award for American League first basemen. In 158 games of 2010, Teixeira finished with a .256 average, 33 home runs, and 108 runs batted in. He also led the American League with 113 runs scored. In the 2010 ALCS, Teixeira injured his hamstring, and did not play for the remainder of the playoffs. The Yankees lost the series to the Rangers in six games.

==== 2011 ====
On June 30, 2011, Teixeira hit his 300th career home run off Randy Wolf of the Milwaukee Brewers.

On August 2, 2011, Teixeira hit a home run from both sides of the plate in the same game for the 12th time in his career, breaking a three-way tie with Chili Davis and Eddie Murray for the most such games all-time.

In August 2011, Teixeira and Curtis Granderson became the first Yankees teammates to have 30 home runs in 115 games since Roger Maris and Mickey Mantle in 1961.

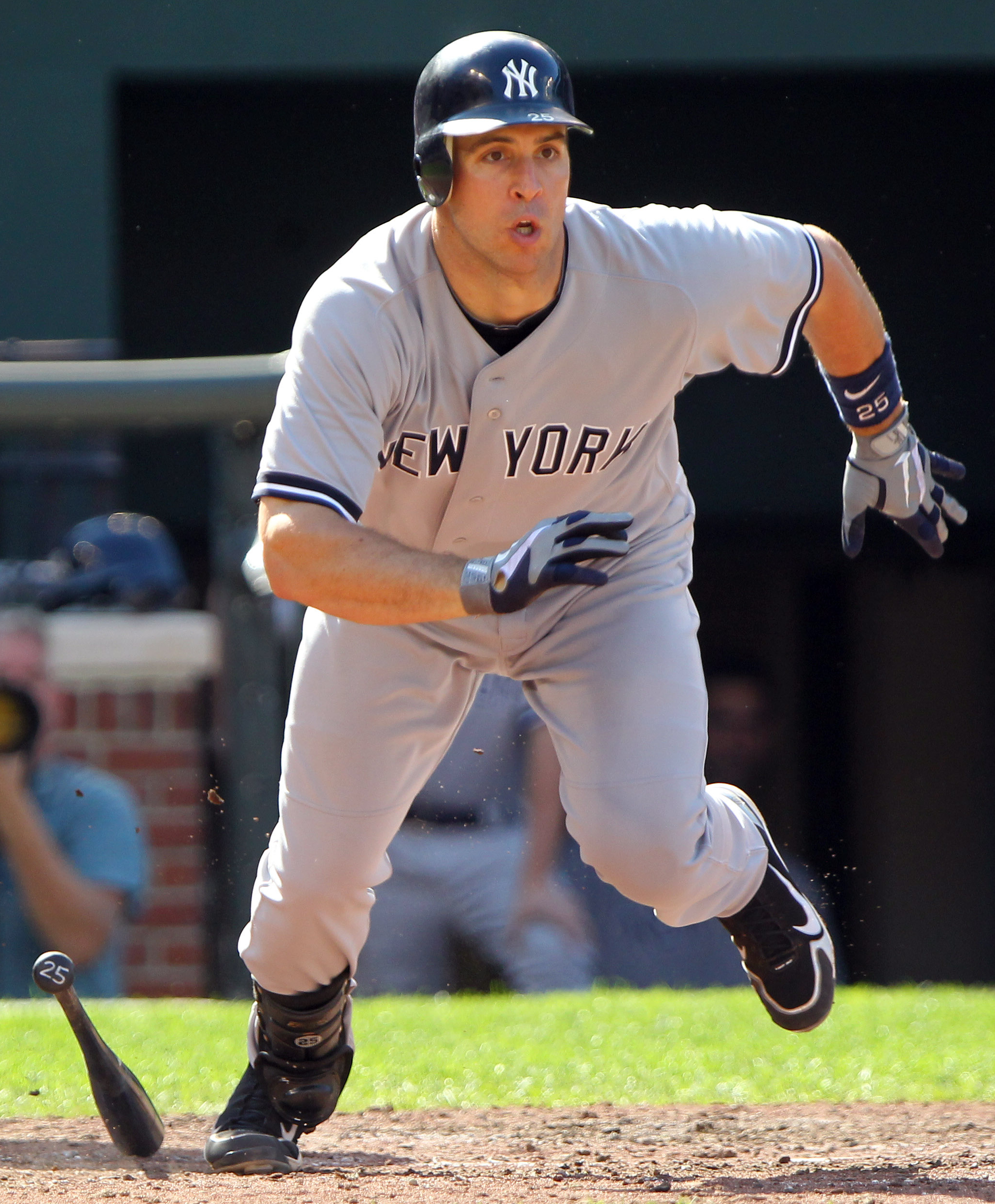
Teixeira on August 28, 2011

Through 2011, he had the third-best career fielding percentage among major league first basemen (.996), behind Casey Kotchman and Kevin Youkilis. During the 2011 year, Teixeira batted .248 with 39 home runs and 111 RBI in 156 games. Teixeira continued his postseason struggles in 2011 as he batted only .167 with 1 RBI in a 5-game ALDS loss to the Detroit Tigers.

==== 2012 ====
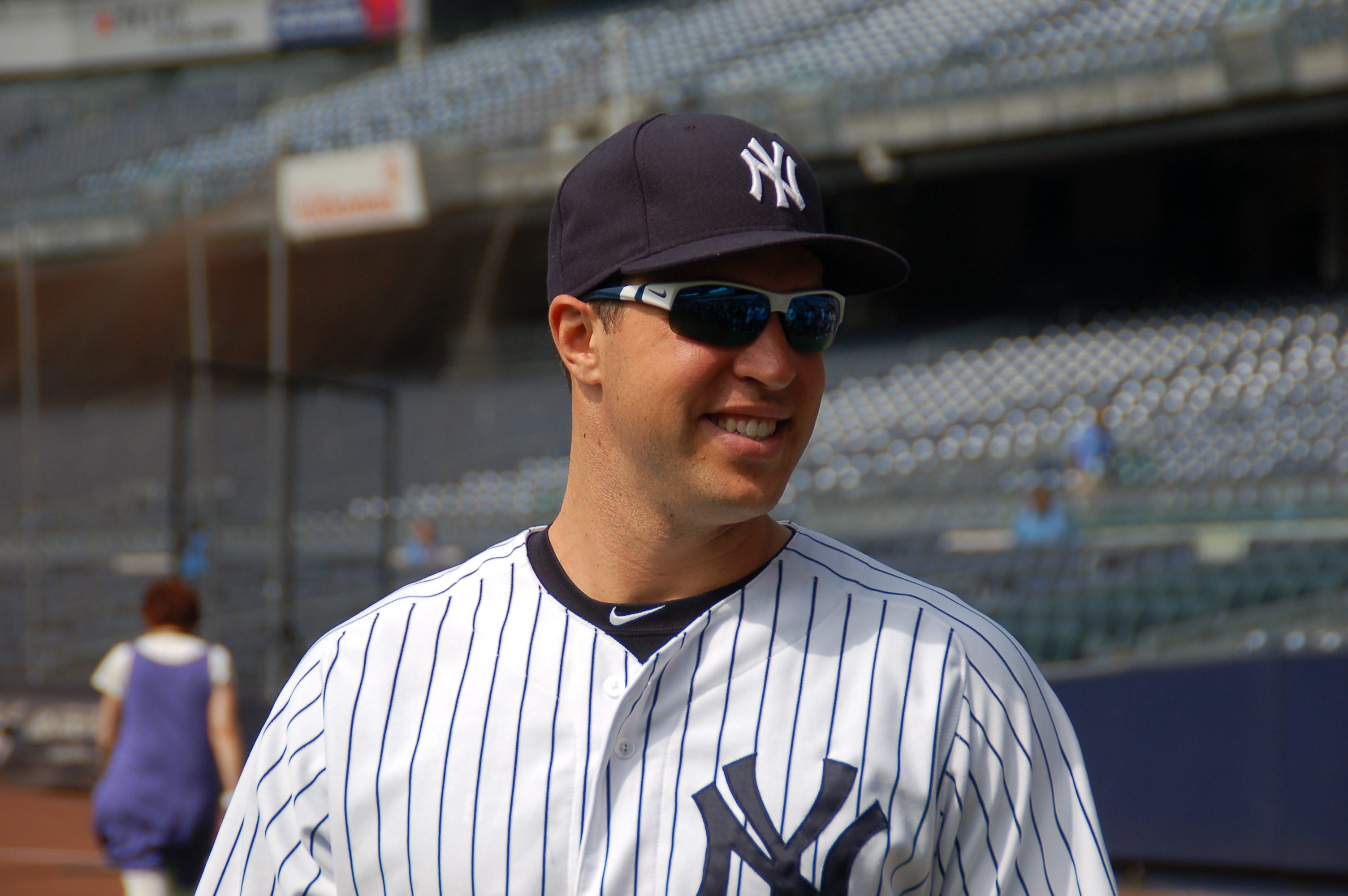
Teixeira in 2012

On March 1, 2012, Teixeira hired Casey Close of Excel Sports Management to be his agent. This came almost a year after Teixeira parted ways with Boras. Close also represented fellow Yankees Derek Jeter and Masahiro Tanaka, as well as Ryan Howard.

Throughout the 2012 season, Teixeira was plagued with several health issues and injuries such as a "persistent and almost debilitating" cough caused by severe congestion of the bronchi, wrist inflammation, and a calf strain. In July, former teammate Vicente Padilla accused Teixiera of being racist against Hispanic players during his time in Texas; Teixeira denied the claims.

Teixeira spent some time on the disabled list with the calf strain from late August until early September. After committing a disputed double play in a 5-4 loss against the Orioles, Teixeira aggravated his calf and was put on the DL again. He would eventually return for the season finale against the Red Sox. He finished the 2012 season with a .251 batting average, 24 home runs, and 84 RBI in 123 games played. The Yankees would again make the playoffs, but lose to the Tigers in a 4-game sweep of the 2012 ALCS. Following the season, Teixeira won the 2012 Gold Glove Award for American League first basemen. He won a Fielding Bible Award as the best fielding first baseman in MLB. He was named the Yankees' nominee for the 2012 Roberto Clemente Award.

==== 2013 ====
On March 6, 2013, Teixeira suffered a strained wrist tendon while he was part of Team USA of the World Baseball Classic. Teixeira began the 2013 season on the 15-day disabled list, and was transferred to the 60-day disabled list on May 14. He returned on May 31, 2013, against the Red Sox going 0−3 with a walk and scoring a run. He aggravated the wrist on June 15, 2013, and the next day, he received cortisone injections to treat the inflammation of the wrist. He was again placed on the 15-day DL due to the inflammation on June 18, 2013. Teixeira played in only 15 games during the 2013 season with a .151 average, 3 home runs, and 12 RBI. On July 1, 2013, Teixeira underwent wrist surgery and was shut down for the rest of the season.

==== 2014 ====
During a game against the Toronto Blue Jays on April 4, 2014, Teixeira left the game after a hamstring injury while trying to fetch a foul ball in foul territory. He was placed on the 15-day disabled list the following day on April 5, 2014. He was activated on April 20, 2014. During a game against the Pittsburgh Pirates on May 17, 2014, Teixeira hit his 350th career home run off of Edinson Vólquez. On May 31, 2014, Teixeira aggravated his wrist that was surgically repaired the previous year. He received a cortisone shot to treat the wrist and missed two games. During a game against the Orioles on June 22, 2014, Teixeira left the game after being hit in the toe of the left foot by a pitch from T. J. McFarland. X-rays came back negative on the toe injury. On September 4, 2014, Teixeira hit his 21st home run of the season, which was a game-tying, solo home run that paved the way for a walk-off 5–4 victory over the Red Sox. In 2014, Teixeira batted only .216, but still hit 22 home runs with 62 RBI limited to 123 games.

==== 2015 ====
Teixeira experienced a resurgent season in 2015, being named to his third All-Star team, hitting his most home runs in a season since 2011. During a game against the Minnesota Twins on August 17, 2015, Teixeira fouled a ball off his leg and left the game. X-rays were negative, but it was projected that he had a deep bone bruise in his leg. Listed as day-to-day, Teixeira missed nearly two weeks and was sent back to New York on August 31, 2015, to visit Yankees head team physician, Dr. Christopher Ahmad to seek second opinions. On September 1, Teixeira underwent CAT scans, x-rays, and MRIs, all testing negative. On September 4, Teixeira was placed on the 15-day disabled list due to the nagging bone bruise. On September 11, Teixeira underwent further tests and an MRI revealed a fracture in his shin, which eventually ended his 2015 season. The injury required three months to recover. In 111 games of 2015, Teixeira batted .255 with 31 home runs and 79 RBI.

==== 2016 ====
Teixeira struggled to open the season. On May 10, 2016, Teixeira revealed that he had been battling neck spasms. On May 25, he underwent an MRI on his neck, which was negative. The next day, he received a cortisone shot to treat the pain in his neck. In a game against the Orioles on June 3, he left the game due to right knee discomfort. He underwent an MRI the next day, which revealed that there was torn articular cartilage, placing him on the 15-day disabled list. Hoping to avoid surgery, Teixeira opted for treatment and rehabilitation on June 8. He was activated on June 25.

While playing the San Diego Padres on July 3, Teixeira hit two home runs, including his 400th career home run. He became only the fifth switch-hitter to hit 400 home runs in a career. He followed teammate and fellow switch-hitter Carlos Beltrán, who had also hit his 400th career home run for the Yankees less than two months earlier on May 15. Another former teammate who also accomplished this feat was Chipper Jones, with whom Teixeira briefly played as a member of the Atlanta Braves.

On August 5, Teixeira held a press conference in which he announced his intent to retire at the end of the season, citing his family life and the year's injuries.

On September 28, Teixeira hit the final home run of his career, which was a walk-off grand slam off Boston Red Sox pitcher Joe Kelly. It was the first game-ending home run Teixeira had ever hit in a regular-season game.

On September 30, prior to a game against the Orioles, Teixeira was honored by the rock band Twisted Sister during a pregame ceremony. The band gifted Teixeira an Epiphone Les Paul guitar with signatures from everyone in the band. The song "I Wanna Rock" was used as Teixeira's walk-up song since he first joined the Yankees. October 2 was Teixeira's final game of his career. Prior to the game, another pregame ceremony took place with his wife and three children visiting. He received several gifts, including a framed jersey and an autographed base. He finished the game 0 for 3 and left the game in the 7th inning as the Yankees lost 5–2 to the Orioles. In 116 games of his final season in the majors, Teixeira batted .204 with 15 home runs and 44 RBI.

=== Coaching career ===
Teixeira served as the hitting coach for the National League team in the 2024 All-Star Futures Game.

=== Awards ===
- Atlantic Coast Conference Baseball Player of the Year (2000)
- Baseball America College Player of the Year Award (2000)
- College Baseball All-America Team (2000)
- Dick Howser Trophy (2000)
- Fielding Bible Award at first base (2012)
- 3× Major League Baseball All-Star (2005, 2009, 2015)
- 2× Major League Baseball Player of the Month Award (July 2004, August 2007)
- 6× Major League Baseball Player of the Week Award (July 4, 2004; May 22, 2005; September 4, 2005; August 26, 2007; September 5, 2010; April 26, 2015)
- 5× Rawlings Gold Glove Award (2005, 2006, 2009, 2010, 2012)
- 3× Silver Slugger Award (2004, 2005, 2009)
- USA Today All-USA high school baseball team (1998)
- World Series champion (2009)
- Included on the ballot for the National Baseball Hall of Fame class of 2022, announced on November 22, 2021

== U.S. House of Representatives ==
Teixeira is a member of the Republican Party. He supported Marco Rubio in his campaign for President in 2016.

=== Elections ===
==== 2026 ====
On August 28, 2025, Teixeira announced that he would run for Texas's 21st congressional district in 2026 as a Republican after incumbent Representative Chip Roy announced his retirement to run for Texas Attorney General. In February, President Donald Trump endorsed Teixeira. He won the Republican primary on March 3, defeating 11 other candidates, and defeated Democratic nominee Kristin Hook in the November general election to win the seat.

== Personal life ==
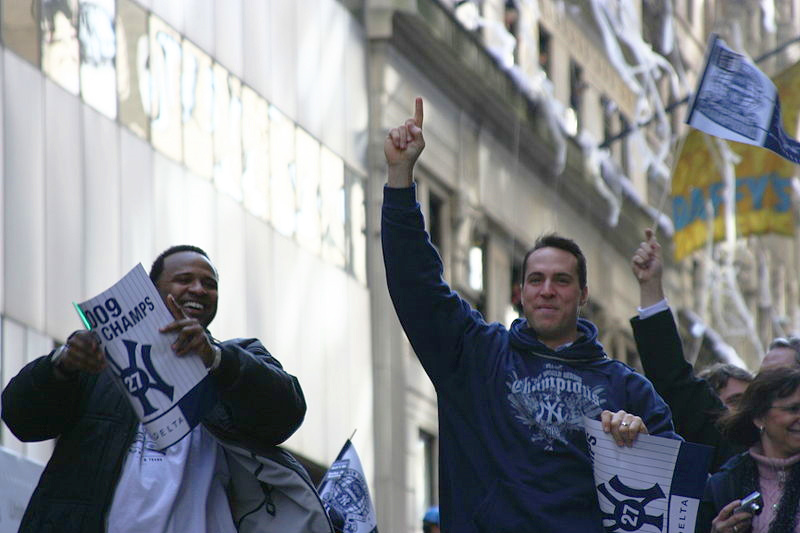
CC Sabathia and Mark Teixeira (right) during the 2009 World Series parade.

After signing his first major league contract, Teixeira set up a scholarship at his high school in honor of a friend who was killed in a car accident.

As of 2009, Teixeira and his family resided in Greenwich, Connecticut. In 2006, Teixeira and his wife Leigh Williams, whom he met at Georgia Tech, established the Mark Teixeira Charitable Fund that supported six scholarships at three high schools in the Dallas–Fort Worth area. They have three children, sons Jack Gordan and William Charles, and daughter Addison Leigh. According to his political campaign, Teixeira moved to central Texas in 2021.

Teixeira's mother Margaret died on December 2, 2015. In 2017, Teixeira's father John remarried Sherry McCann, the mother of Teixeira's former Brave and Yankee teammate Brian McCann.

His hobbies include hunting, golfing, reading, and fishing. He also enjoys Broadway theatre and identifies Les Misérables as his favorite production.

Teixeira is a devout Catholic and credits much of his success to his father's guidance and to the insight that the death of a friend in high school provided. There is also a video on YouTube in which he discusses his faith.

Teixeira completed his bachelor's degree in business administration from Georgia Tech in 2022.

=== In entertainment and media ===
In August 2011, Teixeira made a cameo appearance during the eighth and final season of the HBO TV series Entourage along with teammate Alex Rodriguez. Eduardo Núñez is also seen in the cameo. Teixeira made his Broadway debut in a one-night cameo in the jukebox musical Rock of Ages on January 29, 2013. He played the role of Mark, a bartender at the fictional Bourbon Room.

A self-described avid film buff, Teixeira is a member of the board of the Greenwich International Film Festival.

During 2014 spring training, Teixeira filmed in Foul Territory, a parody interview show aired by the YES Network. He came up with the idea as a way to help the Yankees' new free agent signings to the team. The show has been described as similar in style to The Chris Farley Show and Between Two Ferns with Zach Galifianakis. It was announced as a New York Emmy Award nominee on February 11, 2015.

On February 6, 2017, Teixeira joined ESPN as a baseball analyst. In mid-December 2020, Teixeira announced that he would be leaving the company the next year on February 28.

=== Other side projects ===
Teixeira is a board member of a few organizations, such as the Greenwich International Film Festival, and the Emerald Corridor Foundation.

In 2018, Teixeira and a development team announced plans to build a mixed-use development called Quarry Yards in Grove Park, Atlanta.

== See also ==
- List of Georgia Institute of Technology athletes
- List of largest sports contracts
- List of Major League Baseball annual putouts leaders
- List of Major League Baseball career assists as a first baseman leaders
- List of Major League Baseball career hit by pitch leaders
- List of Major League Baseball career home run leaders
- List of Major League Baseball career putouts as a first baseman leaders
- List of Major League Baseball career runs batted in leaders
- List of Major League Baseball career runs scored leaders
- List of Major League Baseball career slugging percentage leaders
- List of Major League Baseball career strikeouts by batters leaders
- List of Major League Baseball players to hit for the cycle
- New York Yankees award winners and league leaders
- Texas Rangers award winners and league leaders

Awards and achievements
Preceded by Iván Rodríguez	American League Player of the Month; July 2004	Succeeded by Ichiro Suzuki
Preceded by Eric Valent	Hitting for the cycle August 17, 2004	Succeeded by Jeff DaVanon
Preceded by Ryan Braun	National League Player of the Month; August 2007	Succeeded by Matt Holliday
U.S. House of Representatives
Preceded by Chip Roy	Member of the U.S. House of Representatives from Texas's 21st congressional district Taking office 2027	Elect
