= List of Gold Glove Award winners at first base =

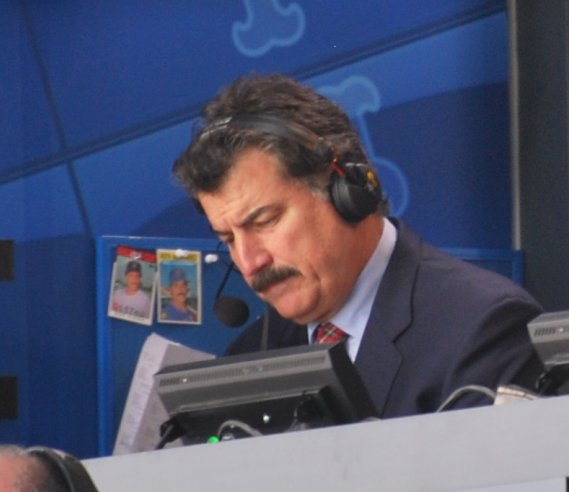
Keith Hernandez won eleven consecutive Gold Gloves at first base, the most by any MLB player.

The Gold Glove Award is the award given annually to the Major League Baseball players judged to have exhibited superior individual fielding performances at each fielding position in both the National League (NL) and the American League (AL), as voted by the managers and coaches in each league. Managers are not permitted to vote for their own players. Eighteen Gold Gloves are awarded each year (with the exception of 1957, 1985, 2007 and 2018), one at each of the nine positions in each league. In 1957, the baseball glove manufacturer Rawlings created the Gold Glove Award to commemorate the best fielding performance at each position. The award was created from a glove made from gold lamé-tanned leather and affixed to a walnut base. Initially, only one Gold Glove per position was awarded to the top fielder in each position in the entire league; however, separate awards were given to the National and American Leagues beginning in 1958.

Keith Hernandez has won the most Gold Gloves at first base, capturing 11 consecutive awards in the National League from 1978 to 1988. In the American League, Don Mattingly won nine times with the New York Yankees for the second-highest total among first basemen, and George Scott won eight awards playing for the Boston Red Sox (three) and the Milwaukee Brewers^{[a]} (five). Vic Power^{[b]}, and Bill White each won seven awards; six-time winners include Wes Parker and J. T. Snow. Mark Teixeira has won five Gold Gloves at the position. Gil Hodges, Eddie Murray and Jeff Bagwell are the only members of the Baseball Hall of Fame to have won a Gold Glove at first base.

Among winners, Steve Garvey has made the most putouts in a season, with 1,606 in 1977. Murray leads American League winners in that category, with 1,538 in 1984. Kevin Youkilis has made the fewest errors in a season, also achieving the highest fielding percentage, when he went the entire 2007 season without an error for a fielding percentage of 1.000. Several players have made one error in a winning season, including Parker in 1968, Snow in 1998, Rafael Palmeiro in 1999, and Teixeira in 2012. Parker, Snow and Teixeira achieved a .999 fielding percentage in those seasons, as did Todd Helton in 2001. The player with the most errors in an award-winning season was Scott; he made 19 errors in 1967. Joey Votto made the most assists in a season, with 173 in 2011. The highest double play total in the major leagues belongs to Cecil Cooper, who turned 160 double plays in 1980.

Darin Erstad won a Gold Glove as a first baseman in 2004 after winning two awards in the outfield (2000, 2002), making him the only player to win the award as an infielder and an outfielder. In 1999, Palmeiro won the Gold Glove with the Texas Rangers while only appearing in 28 games as a first baseman; he appeared in 135 games as a designated hitter that season, resulting in some controversy over his selection. The oldest player to win the position is Yuli Gurriel, who won the award for the Houston Astros at the age of 37 in 2021.

== Key ==
Year	Links to the corresponding Major League Baseball season
PO	Putout
A	Assist
E	Error
DP	Double play
FPct	Fielding percentage
* or **	Winner of the most Gold Glove Awards at his position (** indicates tie)
†	Member of the National Baseball Hall of Fame and Museum

== American League winners ==
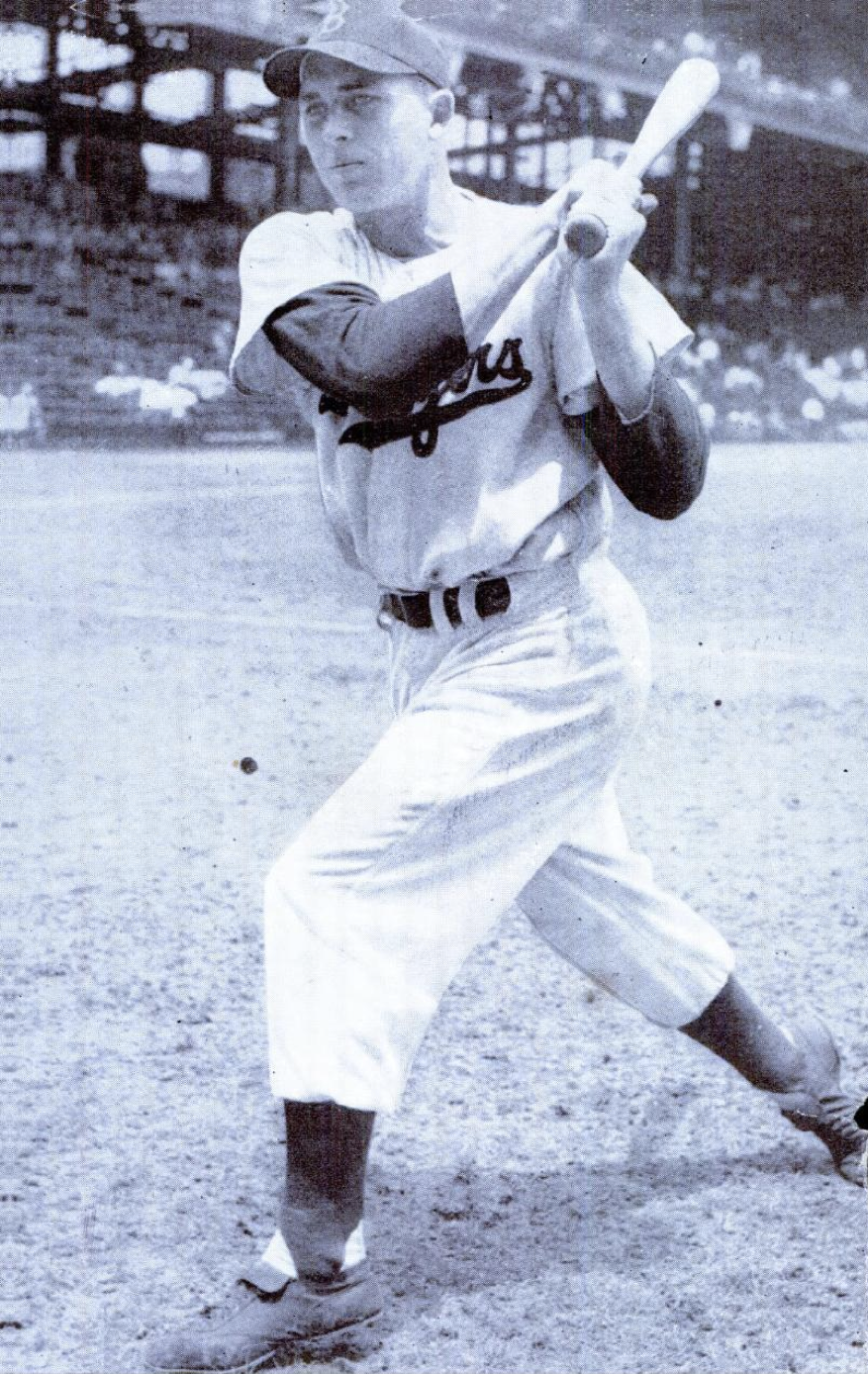
Gil Hodges was first player to ever win the Gold Glove in 1957; at the time it was a consolidated award between both the NL and AL.

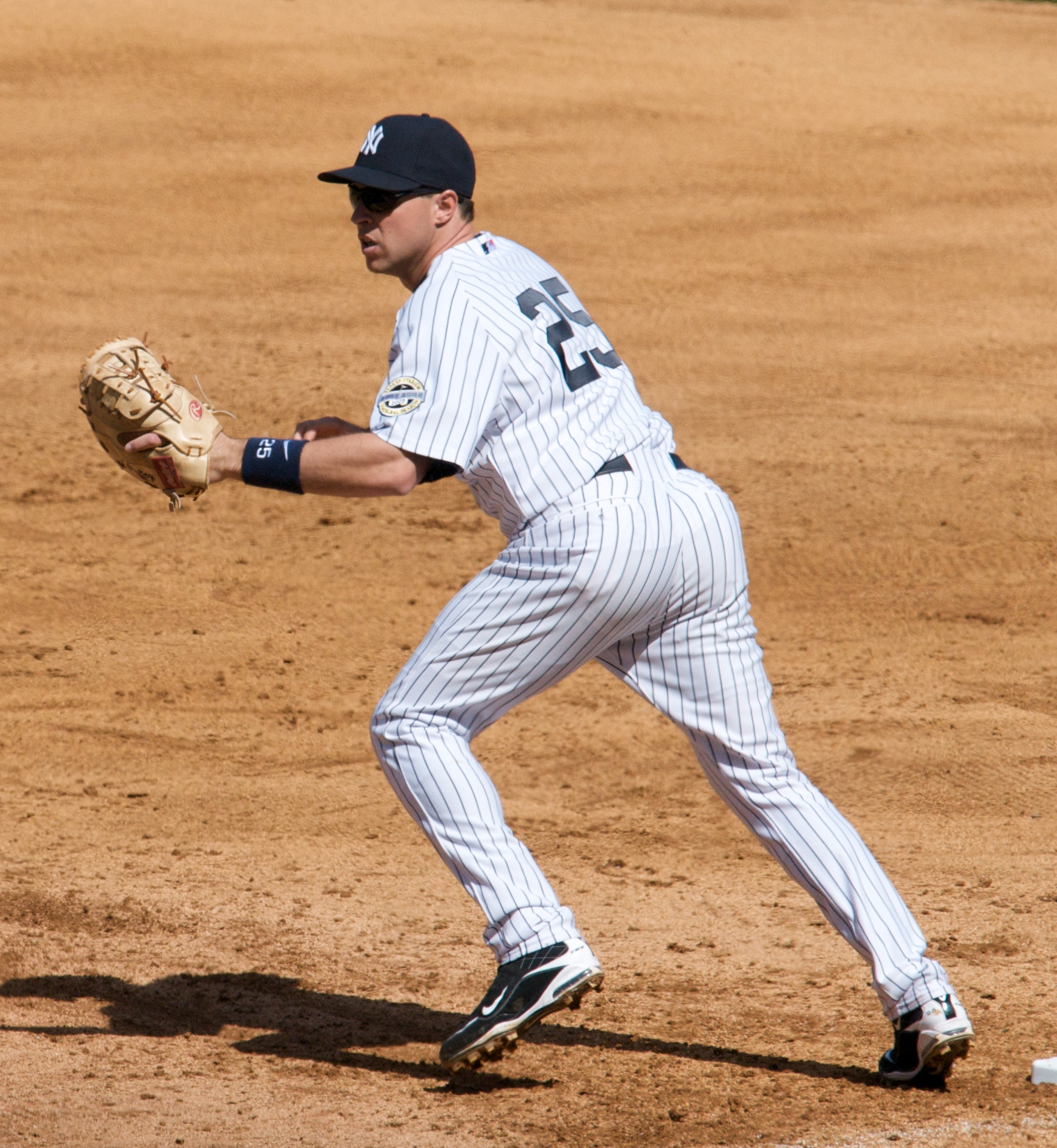
Mark Teixeira (2005–2006, 2009–2010, 2012 AL Gold Glove winner)

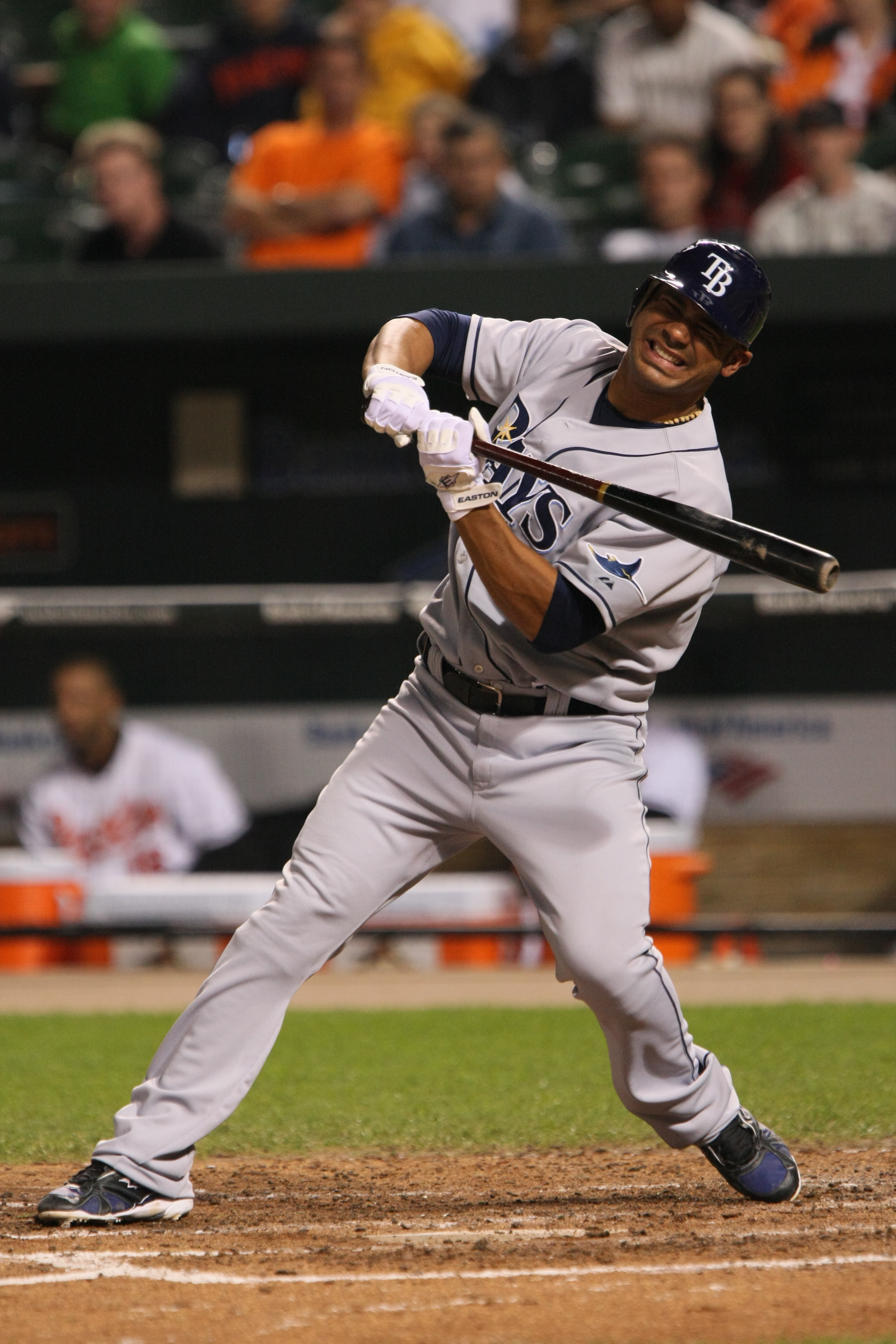
Carlos Peña (2008 AL Gold Glove winner)

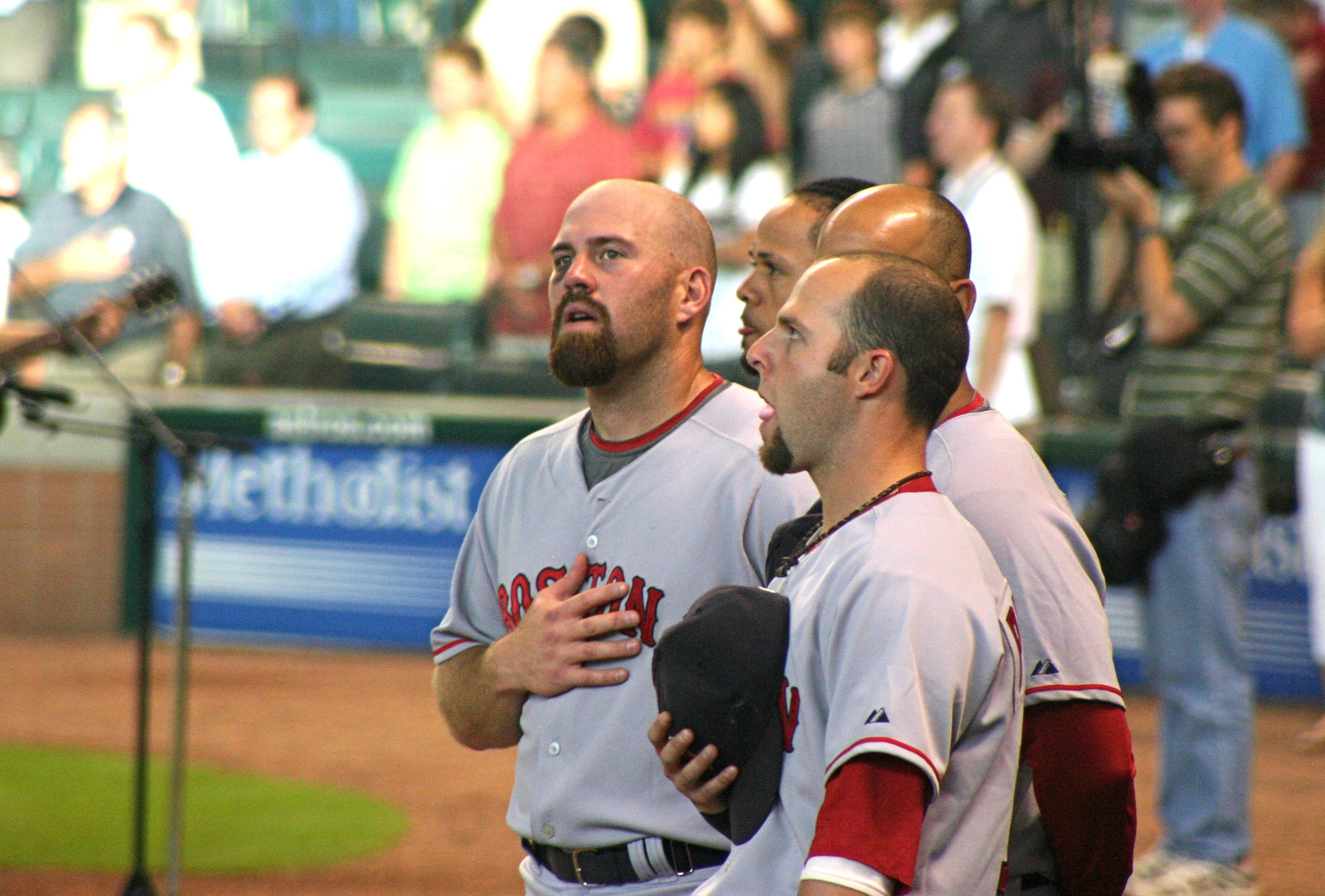
Kevin Youkilis (left; 2007 AL Gold Glove winner)

Year	Player	Team	PO	A	E	DP	FPct	Ref
1957^{[b]}	Gil Hodges^{†}	Brooklyn Dodgers (NL)	1,317	115	14	115	.990	
1958	Vic Power	Kansas City Athletics; Cleveland Indians	702	77	6	94	.992	
1959	Vic Power	Cleveland Indians	1,039	110	6	98	.995	
1960	Vic Power	Cleveland Indians	1,177	145	5	145	.996	
1961	Vic Power	Cleveland Indians	1,154	142	8	101	.994	
1962	Vic Power	Minnesota Twins	1,193	134	10	133	.993	
1963	Vic Power	Minnesota Twins	896	76	8	86	.992	
1964	Vic Power	Minnesota Twins; Los Angeles Angels; Philadelphia Phillies (NL)	491	50	2	39	.996	
1965	Joe Pepitone	New York Yankees	1,036	71	3	104	.997	
1966	Joe Pepitone	New York Yankees	1,044	92	6	92	.995	
1967	George Scott	Boston Red Sox	1,321	94	19	115	.987	
1968	George Scott	Boston Red Sox	807	55	11	68	.987	
1969	Joe Pepitone	New York Yankees	1,254	74	7	118	.995	
1970	Jim Spencer	California Angels	1,212	85	7	131	.995	
1971	George Scott	Boston Red Sox	1,256	75	11	122	.992	
1972	George Scott	Milwaukee Brewers	1,180	73	10	106	.992	
1973	George Scott	Milwaukee Brewers	1,388	118	9	144	.994	
1974	George Scott	Milwaukee Brewers	1,345	114	12	137	.992	
1975	George Scott	Milwaukee Brewers	1,202	109	14	118	.989	
1976	George Scott	Milwaukee Brewers	1,393	107	13	133	.991	
1977	Jim Spencer	Chicago White Sox	977	90	10	76	.991	
1978	Chris Chambliss	New York Yankees	1,366	111	4	119	.997	
1979	Cecil Cooper	Milwaukee Brewers	1,323	78	10	119	.993	
1980	Cecil Cooper	Milwaukee Brewers	1,336	106	5	160	.997	
1981	Mike Squires	Chicago White Sox	729	58	6	68	.992	
1982	Eddie Murray^{†}	Baltimore Orioles	1,269	97	4	106	.997	
1983	Eddie Murray^{†}	Baltimore Orioles	1,393	114	10	136	.993	
1984	Eddie Murray^{†}	Baltimore Orioles	1,538	143	13	152	.992	
1985	Don Mattingly	New York Yankees	1,318	87	7	154	.995	
1986	Don Mattingly	New York Yankees	1,377	100	6	132	.996	
1987	Don Mattingly	New York Yankees	1,239	91	5	122	.996	
1988	Don Mattingly	New York Yankees	1,250	99	9	131	.993	
1989	Don Mattingly	New York Yankees	1,274	87	7	143	.995	
1990	Mark McGwire	Oakland Athletics	1,329	95	5	126	.997	
1991	Don Mattingly	New York Yankees	1,119	77	5	135	.996	
1992	Don Mattingly	New York Yankees	1,209	116	4	129	.997	
1993	Don Mattingly	New York Yankees	1,258	84	3	123	.998	
1994	Don Mattingly	New York Yankees	919	68	2	95	.998	
1995	J. T. Snow	California Angels	1,274	103	10	134	.993	
1996	J. T. Snow	California Angels	1,308	108	7	133	.995	
1997	Rafael Palmeiro	Baltimore Orioles	1,304	112	10	124	.993	
1998	Rafael Palmeiro	Baltimore Orioles	1,435	124	9	127	.994	
1999	Rafael Palmeiro	Texas Rangers	261	13	1	23	.996	
2000	John Olerud	Seattle Mariners	1,271	133	5	154	.996	
2001	Doug Mientkiewicz	Minnesota Twins	1,263	69	4	95	.997	
2002	John Olerud	Seattle Mariners	1,169	101	5	122	.996	
2003	John Olerud	Seattle Mariners	1,096	125	3	126	.998	
2004	Darin Erstad	Anaheim Angels	986	66	4	83	.996	
2005	Mark Teixeira	Texas Rangers	1,377	101	3	127	.998	
2006	Mark Teixeira	Texas Rangers	1,481	88	4	157	.997	
2007	Kevin Youkilis	Boston Red Sox	990	90	0	101	1.000	
2008	Carlos Peña	Tampa Bay Rays	991	106	2	117	.998	
2009	Mark Teixeira	New York Yankees	1,222	49	4	110	.997	
2010	Mark Teixeira	New York Yankees	1,227	80	3	137	.998	
2011	Adrián González	Boston Red Sox	1,222	125	4	106	.997	
2012	Mark Teixeira	New York Yankees	985	69	1	91	.999	
2013	Eric Hosmer	Kansas City Royals	1,205	122	8	118	.994	
2014	Eric Hosmer	Kansas City Royals	1,043	88	10	85	.991	
2015	Eric Hosmer	Kansas City Royals	1,261	101	4	121	.997	
2016	Mitch Moreland	Texas Rangers	1,036	65	2	138	.998	
2017	Eric Hosmer	Kansas City Royals	1,235	75	4	124	.997	
2018	Matt Olson	Oakland Athletics	1,403	84	7	115	.995	
2019	Matt Olson	Oakland Athletics	1,023	90	8	95	.993	
2020	Evan White	Seattle Mariners	370	32	1	36	.998	
2021	Yuli Gurriel	Houston Astros	1,057	86	6	95	.995	
2022	Vladimir Guerrero Jr.	Toronto Blue Jays	969	47	10	80	.990	
2023	Nathaniel Lowe	Texas Rangers	1,221	106	3	128	.998	
2024	Carlos Santana	Minnesota Twins	998	92	4	67	.996	
2025	Ty France	Minnesota Twins; Toronto Blue Jays	755	74	3	47	.996	
2026	Christian Walker	Houston Astros	968	112	3	109	.997	

== National League winners ==
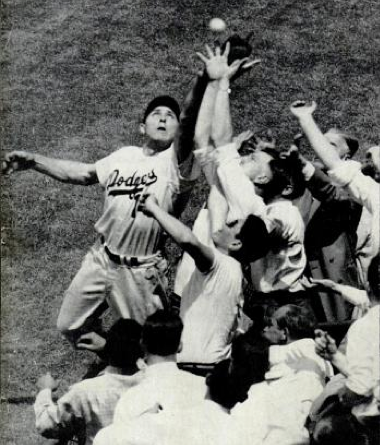
Gil Hodges, First Player to ever win the Gold Glove in 1957, that was a consolidated award of the NL/AL

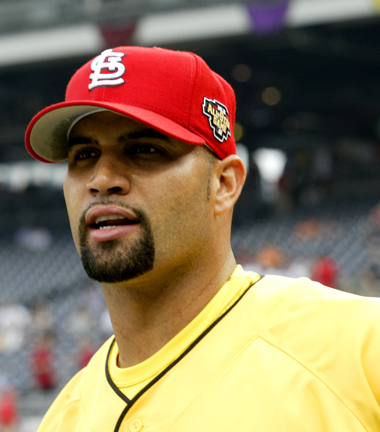
Albert Pujols (2006, 2010 NL Gold Glove winner)

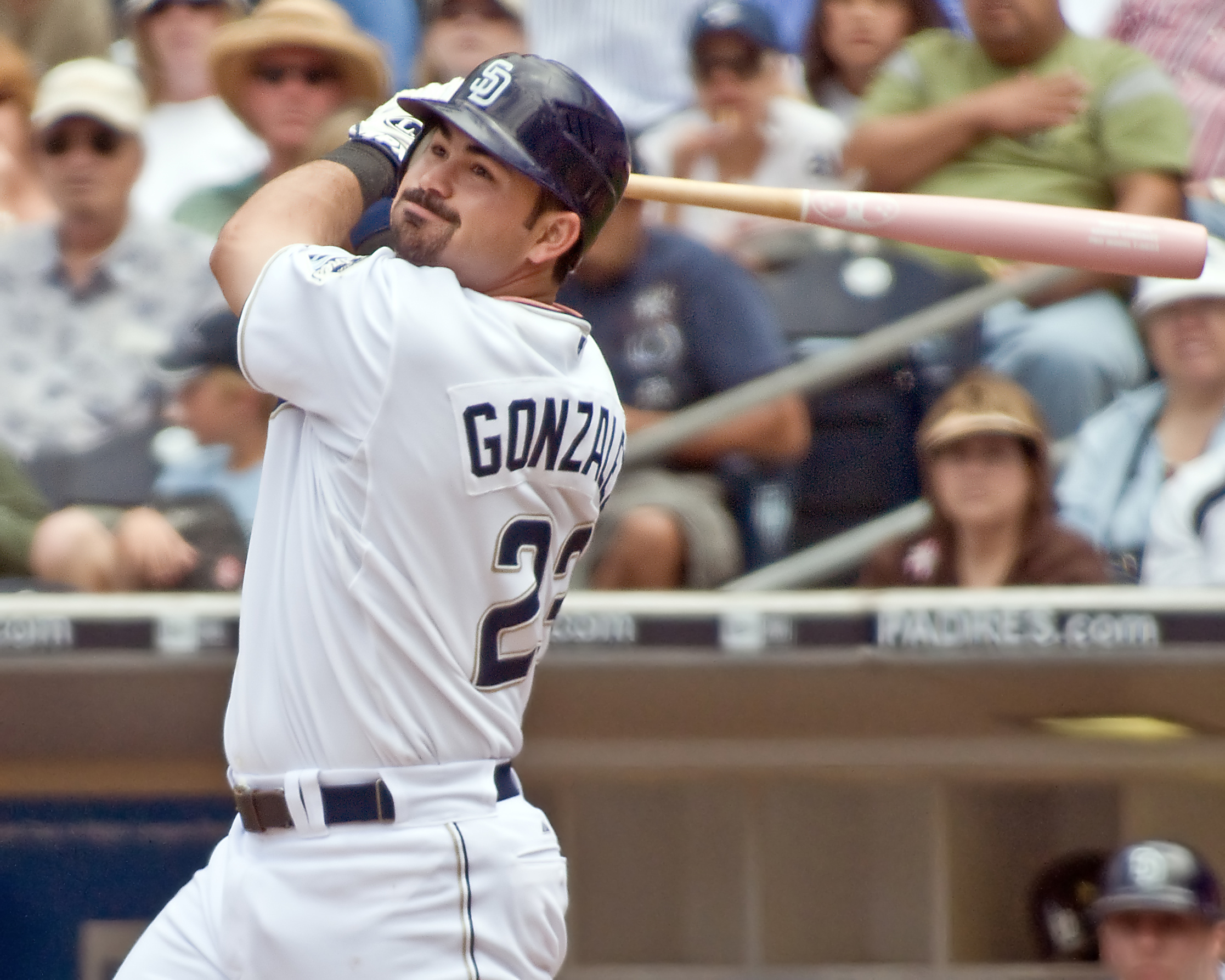
Adrián González (2008–2009, 2014 NL Gold Glove winner)

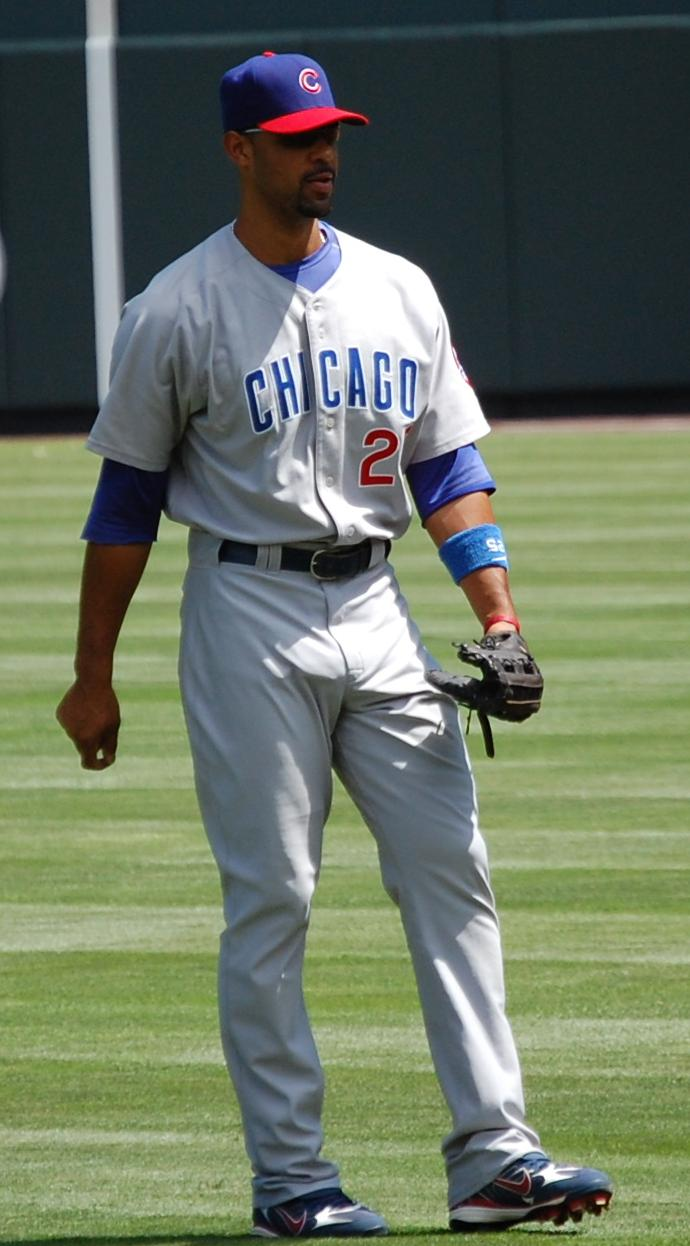
Derrek Lee (2003, 2005, 2007 NL Gold Glove winner)

Year	Player	Team	PO	A	E	DP	FPct	Ref
1957^{[c]}	Gil Hodges^{†}	Brooklyn Dodgers	1,317	115	14	115	.990	
1958	Gil Hodges^{†}	Los Angeles Dodgers	907	69	8	134	.992	
1959	Gil Hodges^{†}	Los Angeles Dodgers	891	66	8	77	.992	
1960	Bill White	St. Louis Cardinals	994	65	11	109	.990	
1961	Bill White	St. Louis Cardinals	1,373	104	17	125	.989	
1962	Bill White	St. Louis Cardinals	1,221	94	9	114	.993	
1963	Bill White	St. Louis Cardinals	1,389	105	13	126	.991	
1964	Bill White	St. Louis Cardinals	1,513	101	6	125	.996	
1965	Bill White	St. Louis Cardinals	1,308	109	11	114	.992	
1966	Bill White	Philadelphia Phillies	1,422	109	9	118	.994	
1967	Wes Parker	Los Angeles Dodgers	913	68	4	72	.996	
1968	Wes Parker	Los Angeles Dodgers	939	69	1	74	.999	
1969	Wes Parker	Los Angeles Dodgers	1,189	79	6	87	.995	
1970	Wes Parker	Los Angeles Dodgers	1,498	125	7	116	.996	
1971	Wes Parker	Los Angeles Dodgers	1,215	97	5	113	.996	
1972	Wes Parker	Los Angeles Dodgers	1,074	68	4	91	.997	
1973	Mike Jorgensen	Montreal Expos	990	80	5	88	.995	
1974	Steve Garvey	Los Angeles Dodgers	1,536	62	8	108	.995	
1975	Steve Garvey	Los Angeles Dodgers	1,500	77	8	96	.995	
1976	Steve Garvey	Los Angeles Dodgers	1,583	67	3	138	.998	
1977	Steve Garvey	Los Angeles Dodgers	1,606	55	8	137	.995	
1978	Keith Hernandez*	St. Louis Cardinals	1,436	96	10	124	.994	
1979	Keith Hernandez*	St. Louis Cardinals	1,489	146	8	145	.995	
1980	Keith Hernandez*	St. Louis Cardinals	1,572	115	9	146	.995	
1981	Keith Hernandez*	St. Louis Cardinals	1,054	86	3	99	.997	
1982	Keith Hernandez*	St. Louis Cardinals	1,586	135	11	140	.994	
1983	Keith Hernandez*	St. Louis Cardinals; New York Mets	1,418	147	13	147	.992	
1984	Keith Hernandez*	New York Mets	1,214	142	8	127	.994	
1985	Keith Hernandez*	New York Mets	1,310	139	4	113	.997	
1986	Keith Hernandez*	New York Mets	1,199	149	5	115	.996	
1987	Keith Hernandez*	New York Mets	1,298	149	10	110	.993	
1988	Keith Hernandez*	New York Mets	734	77	2	63	.998	
1989	Andrés Galarraga	Montreal Expos	1,335	91	11	97	.992	
1990	Andrés Galarraga	Montreal Expos	1,300	94	10	93	.993	
1991	Will Clark	San Francisco Giants	1,273	110	4	115	.997	
1992	Mark Grace	Chicago Cubs	1,580	141	4	119	.998	
1993	Mark Grace	Chicago Cubs	1,456	112	5	134	.997	
1994	Jeff Bagwell^{†}	Houston Astros	922	120	9	94	.991	
1995	Mark Grace	Chicago Cubs	1,211	114	7	93	.995	
1996	Mark Grace	Chicago Cubs	1,259	107	4	120	.997	
1997	J. T. Snow	San Francisco Giants	1,308	108	7	133	.995	
1998	J. T. Snow	San Francisco Giants	1,040	94	1	99	.999	
1999	J. T. Snow	San Francisco Giants	1,221	122	6	123	.996	
2000	J. T. Snow	San Francisco Giants	1,198	92	6	35	.995	
2001	Todd Helton^{†}	Colorado Rockies	1,306	119	2	139	.999	
2002	Todd Helton^{†}	Colorado Rockies	1,358	112	7	138	.995	
2003	Derrek Lee	Florida Marlins	1,279	97	5	132	.996	
2004	Todd Helton^{†}	Colorado Rockies	1,356	144	4	130	.997	
2005	Derrek Lee	Chicago Cubs	1,323	122	6	118	.996	
2006	Albert Pujols	St. Louis Cardinals	1,345	110	6	145	.996	
2007	Derrek Lee	Chicago Cubs	1,165	87	7	99	.994	
2008	Adrián González	San Diego Padres	1,306	130	6	129	.996	
2009	Adrián González	San Diego Padres	1,224	136	7	116	.995	
2010	Albert Pujols	St. Louis Cardinals	1,458	157	4	146	.998	
2011	Joey Votto	Cincinnati Reds	1,341	173	6	127	.996	
2012	Adam LaRoche	Washington Nationals	1,260	100	7	113	.995	
2013	Paul Goldschmidt	Arizona Diamondbacks	1,494	99	5	118	.997	
2014	Adrián González	Los Angeles Dodgers	1,318	118	6	118	.996	
2015	Paul Goldschmidt	Arizona Diamondbacks	1,378	123	5	129	.997	
2016	Anthony Rizzo	Chicago Cubs	1,268	126	6	98	.996	
2017	Paul Goldschmidt	Arizona Diamondbacks	1,254	103	4	116	.997	
2018	Anthony Rizzo	Chicago Cubs	1,133	147	7	128	.995	
2018	Freddie Freeman	Atlanta Braves	1,268	72	7	116	.995	
2019	Anthony Rizzo	Chicago Cubs	1,140	123	5	120	.996	
2020	Anthony Rizzo	Chicago Cubs	418	44	1	39	.998	
2021	Paul Goldschmidt	St. Louis Cardinals	1,144	106	2	111	.998	
2022	Christian Walker	Arizona Diamondbacks	1,109	78	5	106	.996	
2023	Christian Walker	Arizona Diamondbacks	1,075	77	2	106	.998	
2024	Christian Walker	Arizona Diamondbacks	977	76	2	104	.998	
2025	Matt Olson	Atlanta Braves	1,147	145	5	96	.996	
2026	Matt Olson	Atlanta Braves	1,195	108	8	124	.994	

== Footnotes ==
- ^{a} The Brewers were members of the American League until 1997, when Commissioner Bud Selig offered the team the option to switch leagues due to a realignment of Major League Baseball's divisions. The Brewers have been members of the National League since 1998.
- ^{b} Born Victor Pellot, he used the alias "Vic Power" during his career in MLB due to his experiences in Canada that drew laughs from fans due to his last name sounding similar to obscene slang
- ^{c} ^{c} In 1957, Gold Gloves were given to the top fielders in Major League Baseball, instead of separate awards for the National and American Leagues; therefore, the winners are the same in each table.
