= Shirley Clarke Franklin Park =

Park in Atlanta, Georgia

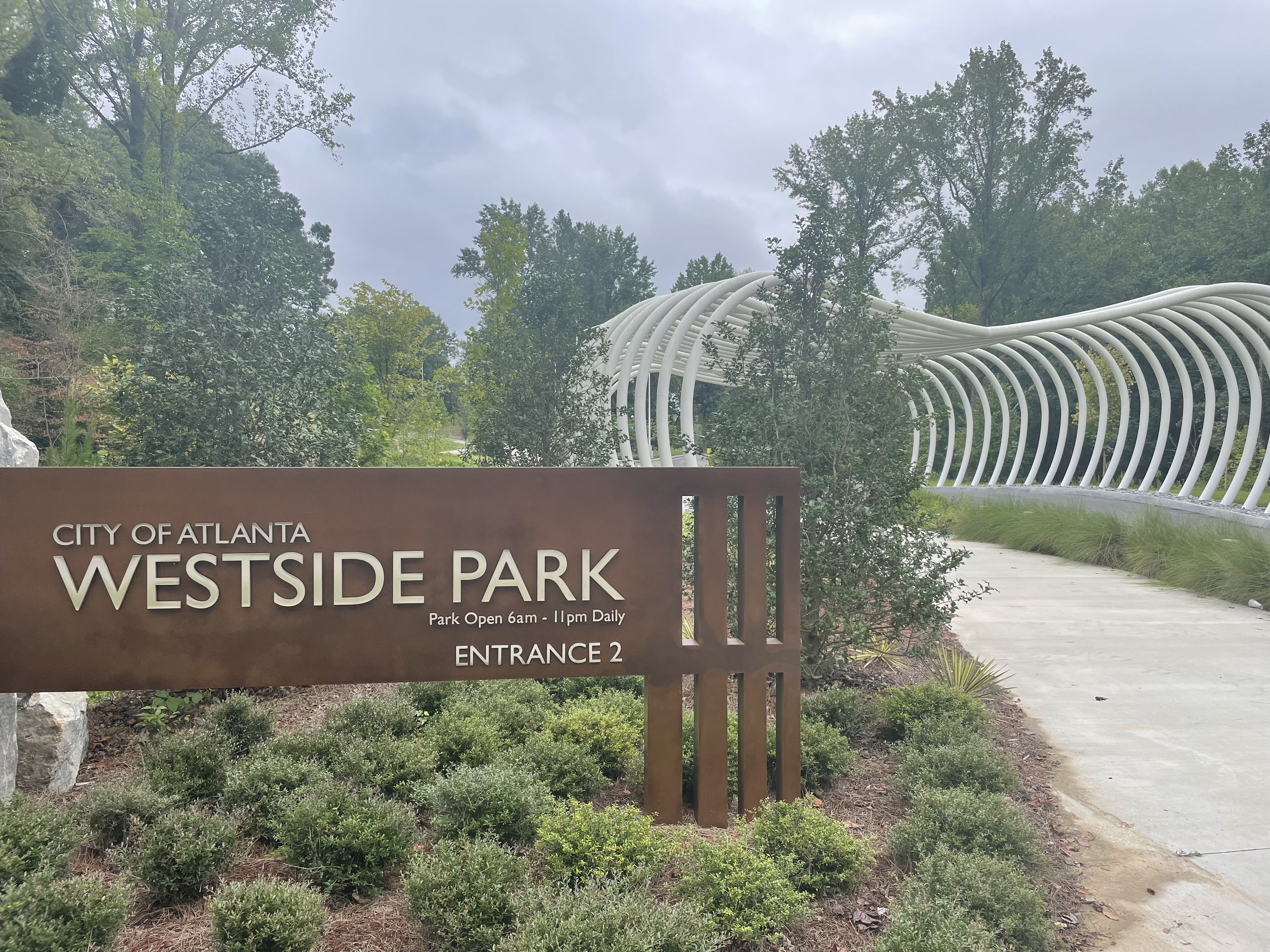
- Whalebone sculpture at the entrance to the park

- Location within Atlanta
- Type: Public park
- Location: Atlanta, Georgia, United States
- Coordinates: 33°46′51″N 84°26′10″W
- Area: 280 acres (110 ha)
- Opened: August 20, 2021; 4 years ago
- Operator: Atlanta Department of Parks and Recreation
- Website: Official website

Shirley Clarke Franklin Park (formerly Westside Park) is a park in Atlanta, Georgia located on the site of the former Bellwood Quarry. The park is between Johnson Road and Donald Lee Hollowell Parkway and between the neighborhoods of Bankhead, Grove Park, and Knight Park/Howell Station. Westside Park at Bellwood Quarry was a major green space project of the Atlanta Beltline master plan and connects to the Proctor Creek Greenway Trail.

== History ==
The land, which was owned by Fulton County, was previously leased to Vulcan Materials. On December 10, 2005, Atlanta Mayor Shirley Franklin announced a plan to acquire the land in order to create a 351-acre (1.42 km^{2}) park with a 45-acre (180,000 m^{2}) lake which would also serve as a drinking water reservoir. The plan was a portion of the extensive Beltline project to construct a ring of parks, trails, and transit surrounding the core of Atlanta. As proposed, Westside Reservoir Park was nearly twice the size of Atlanta's premiere greenspace, Piedmont Park. Acquisition by the city was completed on June 30, 2006.

On December 29, 2017, outgoing mayor Kasim Reed unveiled plans for phase one of the park's construction. The cost of the first phase was approximately $26.5 million. Phase one includes a gateway to the park, a "grand overlook" of both the quarry and the Atlanta skyline, and pedestrian connections to the Proctor Creek Greenway.

On September 6, 2018, the official groundbreaking took place for Westside Park.

On August 27, 2019, Westside Park received a major boost with the announcement that the Arthur M. Blank Family Foundation had awarded a $17.5 million grant for the Beltline project. The Blank grant accelerated the development of parks and trails along the 22-mile circular corridor – especially on the Westside.

At a ribbon-cutting ceremony on August 20, 2021, Atlanta's Westside Park was opened to the public.

On February 3, 2025, Westside Park was renamed to Shirley Clarke Franklin Park, in honor of the former mayor of Atlanta. She helped acquire the quarry before it turned into a park.

== Bellwood Quarry ==
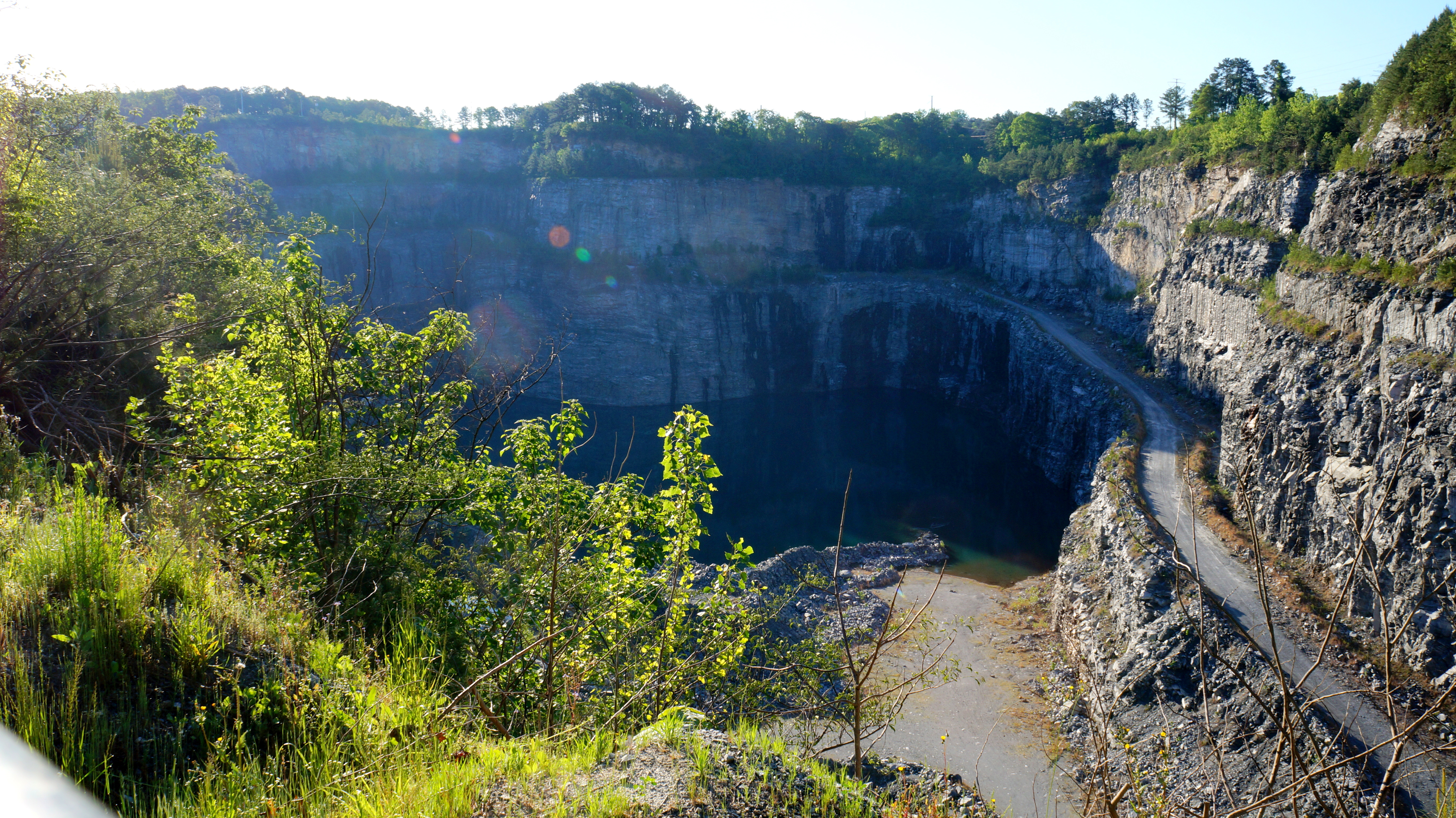
The southside of Bellwood Quarry (c. 2014) prior to the site being flooded

The former granite quarry, which closed in 2007, was a popular hangout spot for local teens. The site was used as a location for the filming of the AMC's series The Walking Dead in the summer of 2010. It was also used as a filming location for season four episode 14 of The Vampire Diaries, a scene in Mockingjay Part 1, and the final scene of The Fundamentals of Caring. In 2016, it was featured prominently in several episodes of the Netflix series Stranger Things. The quarry was used to film lunar surface sequences in the Neil Armstrong biographical film, First Man, released in 2018.

During construction of the reservoir and the park, the area was closed to the public. A five-mile tunnel was dug to connect the quarry to the Chattahoochee River. The reservoir began filling in April of 2020, and completed filling in February 2021.

In addition to its recreational role, Shirley Clarke Franklin Park functions as a critical piece of Atlanta’s water infrastructure. The reservoir significantly increases the city’s emergency water storage capacity, holding a backup water supply of more than two billion gallons, which would last more than 30 days.
