= List of largest video screens =

This is a list of the largest video-capable screens in the world.

| Rank | Location | City | Country | Year Installed | Size (m^{2}) | Size (sq ft) | Dimensions (m) | Dimensions (ft) | Resolution | Megapixels | Technology | Display Type | Provider | References |
|---|---|---|---|---|---|---|---|---|---|---|---|---|---|---|
| 1 | Sphere | Paradise, Nevada | United States | 2023 | 54,000 | 580,000 | 157 by 112 | 515 by 367 | | | LED | Transparent (exterior) | SACO Technologies | |
| 2 | Resorts World | Winchester, Nevada | United States | 2020 | 15,016.5 | 161,636 | 145 by 104 | 475 by 340 | | | 50 mm LED Custom Mesh | Transparent | Y Design Build | |
| 3 | Fremont Street Experience | Las Vegas | United States | | 12,000 | 130,000 | 457 by 27 | 1,500 by 90 | 15,104 × 1,088 pixels | 16.4 | 27 mm LED | Transparent | Watchfire | |
| 4 | Mall Taman Anggrek | West Jakarta | Indonesia | 2012 | 8,675 | 93,380 | 475 by 25 | 1,559 by 82 | 3,024 × 670 pixels | 2.0 | 42.5 mm and 166 mm | Transparent & Traditional | StandardVision | |
| 5 | The Place | Beijing | China | | 7,466 | 80,360 | 250 by 30 | 820 by 98 | | | 35 × 40 mm pixel pitch | Transparent (mesh) | Optotech | |
| 6 | M+ Facade | Hong Kong | Hong Kong | | 7,238.0 | 77,909 | 361 by 216 | 110 by 65.8 | 2,816 × 1,686 pixels | 4.7 | LED | Transparent | Herzog & de Meuron | |
| 7 | SoFi Stadium | Inglewood, California | United States | | 6,500 | 70,000 | 110 by 12 | 360 by 40 | | 80 | 8 mm LED | Traditional & double-sided | Samsung Electronics | |
| 8 | Citigroup Tower | Shanghai | China | | 6,030.7 | 64,914 | 140 by 43 | 458 by 142 | 952 × 298 pixels | 0.283696 | LED | Transparent | 深圳沃科半导体照明有限公司 | |
| 9 | Mexico City Arena | Mexico City | Mexico | | 5,990.8 | 64,484 | 29 by 209 | 94 by 686 | | | 125 mm LED stick elements | Transparent | Daktronics | |
| 10 | Mercedes-Benz Stadium | Atlanta | United States | 2017 | 5,793 | 62,350 | 328 by 18 | 1,075 by 58 | 21,504 × 1,152 pixels | 24.7 | 15HD LED Video | Traditional | Daktronics | |
| 11 | Tauron Arena Kraków | Kraków | Poland | 2014 | 5,100.0 | 54,896 | 510 by 10 | 1,673 by 33 | 2,168 × 168 pixels | 0.36 | 60 mm pixel pitch | Transparent | ColosseoEAS | |
| 12 | New Century Global Center | Chengdu | China | | 4,079.9 | 43,916 | 136 by 30 | 446 by 98 | | | UMesh P25 | Transparent (Mesh) | Unilumin | |
| 13 | Hydroproject Institute, Volokolamskoye Shosse, 2 | Moscow | Russia | | 3,816.0 | 41,075 | 48 by 80 | 158 by 261 | 1536 × 2544 pixels | 3.9 | Athena P31.25 H/V | Transparent (Mesh) | QSTECH | |
| 14 | Arena Corinthians | São Paulo | Brazil | | 3,400 | 37,000 | 170 by 20 | 558 by 66 | | | DOT-XL 6 RGB | Transparent | Osram | |
| 15 | Qin Han Tang Emporium | Xi'an | China | | 3,026.4 | 32,576 | 167.9 by 46.5 | 551 by 152.5 | 16,256 × 1,792 pixels | 29.13 | 10 mm pixel pitch | Traditional | Liantronics | |
| 16 | Hangzhou Asiatic Center | Hangzhou | China | | 2,811.3 | 30,261 | 60.4 by 46.5 | 198 by 152.5 | 664 × 864 pixels | 0.57 | 70 mm LED stick elements | Transparent | Daktronics | |
| 17 | Allegiant Stadium | Paradise, Nevada | United States | | 2,560 | 27,600 | 105 by 24 | 345 by 80 | | | | Transparent | | |
| 18 | New York Marriott Marquis | New York City | United States | | 2,379 | 25,610 | 119.7 by 23.7 | 392.7 by 77.7 | 10,048 × 2,368 pixels | 23.79 | 10 mm pixel pitch | Traditional | Mitsubishi Electric Diamond Vision | |
| 19 | Mizuho PayPay Dome Fukuoka | Fukuoka | Japan | 2023 | 2,150.1 | 23,143 | 60 by 15 | 197 by 49 | | | High brightness 3-in-1 LED | Traditional | Sony Electronics | |
| 20 | Texas Motor Speedway | Fort Worth, Texas | United States | 2023 | 2,108.2 | 22,692 | 66.56 by 31.68 | 218.5 by 104 | | 8.24 | 16mm pixel pitch | Traditional | GoVision | |
| 21 | Gillette Stadium | Foxborough, Massachusetts | United States | 2023 | 2,060 | 22,200 | 113 by 18 | 370 by 60 | | | 10 mm pixel pitch LED | | Daktronics | |
| 22 | EverBank Stadium | Jacksonville, Florida | United States | 2014 | 2,020 | 21,700 | 110 by 18 | 362 by 60 | | | 13 mm HD pixel spacing | Traditional | Daktronics | |
| 23 | Palms Casino Resort | Paradise, Nevada | United States | 2019 | 1,996.3 | 21,488 | 83 by 24 | 272 by 79 | | | LED Mesh | Transparent | Yahman/ Yesco | |
| 24 | BattleKart Dottignies | Mouscron | Belgium | | 1,800.0 | 19,375 | 30.5 by 60.0 | 100 by 196.8 | 3400 × 6259 pixels | 21.3 | X24 Video projectors | Traditional | BattleKart / Seiko Epson | |
| 25 | Harmon Corner | Paradise, Nevada | United States | 2012 | 1,706 | 18,360 | 93 by 18 | 306 by 60 | 7,360 × 1,440 pixels | 10.60 | 12 mm pixel Pitch SMD (Surface Mount Diode) | Traditional | Prismview | |
| 26 | Taipei Arena Sky Screen | Taipei | Taiwan | 2006 | 1,693.8 | 18,232 | 105 by 16 | 344 by 53 | 1,743 × 260 pixel | 0.45 | 60 x 60 mm pixel pitch | Transparent | OptoTech | |
| 27 | Citi Field | New York City | United States | 2023 | 1,620 | 17,400 | | | | | LED | Traditional | Samsung Electronics | |
| 28 | Gies Memorial Stadium | Champaign, Illinois | United States | 2026 | 1,608.6 | 17,315 | 76 by 21 | 250 by 69 | | | LED | Traditional | Daktronics | |
| 29 | Empower Field at Mile High | Denver | United States | 2023 | 1,567.7 | 16,875 | 69 by 23 | 225 by 75 | | | | Traditional | | |
| 30 | Third Ring Road | Moscow | Russia | | 1,503.5 | 16,184 | 75.2 by 20.0 | 246.7 by 65.6 | 1,504 × 400 pixels | 0.60 | 50 x 25 mm pixel pitch | Transparent (mesh) | QSTECH | |
| 31 | Churchill Downs | Louisville, Kentucky | United States | 2014 | 1,420 | 15,300 | 52 by 27 | 170 by 90 | 4,000 × 2,160 pixels | 8.64 | | Traditional | Panasonic / Lighthouse | |
| 32 | Charlotte Motor Speedway | Concord, North Carolina | United States | 2024 | 1,416.6 | 15,248 | 61 by 23 | 200 by 77 | 3,780 × 1,460 pixels | 1.57 | | Traditional | GoVision | |
| 33 | Sogo Department Store | Hong Kong | Hong Kong | | 1,359.4 | 14,632 | 72 by 19 | 236 by 62 | 1,920 × 7,168 pixels | 13.76 | | Traditional | Mitsubishi Electric Diamond Vision | |
| 34 | NRG Stadium | Houston | United States | 2013 | 1,351.6 | 14,549 | 84.5 by 16.0 | 277.2 by 52.5 | | 5.28 | | Traditional | Mitsubishi Electric Diamond Vision | |
| 35 | Gujarat Science City | Gujarat | India | | 1,230 | 13,200 | 122 by 10 | 400 by 33 | 15,360 × 8,640 pixels | | | | VizExperts | |
| 36 | Progressive Field | Cleveland | United States | | 1,211.4 | 13,039 | 67 by 18 | 221 by 59 | | | | Traditional | Daktronics | |
| 37 | Accor Stadium | Sydney | Australia | | 1,207.9 | 13,002 | 120 by 10 | 394 by 33 | | | | | Daktronics | |
| 38 | Meydan Racecourse | Dubai | United Arab Emirates | | 1,180.6 | 12,708 | 108 by 11 | 353 by 37 | 1,088 × 10,752 pixels | 11.70 | | Traditional | Mitsubishi Electric Diamond Vision | |
| 39 | Caesars Superdome | New Orleans | United States | | 1,175.6 | 12,654 | 101 by 12 | 333 by 38 | 6,680 × 710 pixels | | 16 mm Discreet | Traditional | Panasonic / Lighthouse | |
| 40 | Kawasaki Racecourse | Kawasaki, Kanagawa | Japan | | 1,140.1 | 12,272 | 72 by 16 | 236 by 52 | | | | Traditional | | |
| 41 | Incheon SSG Landers Field | Incheon | South Korea | | 1,138.7 | 12,257 | 63 by 18 | 208 by 59 | 1,088 × 3,840 pixels | 4.18 | | Traditional | Prismview / Diversified Innovation | |
| 42 | London Stadium | London | United Kingdom | | 1,128.6 | 12,148 | 81.2 by 13.9 | 266.4 by 45.6 | | | 15 mm HD pixel spacing | Traditional | Daktronics | |
| 43 | American Family Field | Milwaukee | United States | | 1,122.0 | 12,077 | | | | 2.36 | 8 mm LED video | Traditional | ANC Sports | |
| 44 | AT&T Stadium | Arlington, Texas | United States | 2009 | 1,070 | 11,520 | 49 by 22 | 160 by 72 | 1,088 × 2,432 pixels | 2.65 | | Traditional | Mitsubishi Electric Diamond Vision / ANC Sports | |
| 45 | T-Mobile Park | Seattle | United States | 2013 | 1,061.4 | 11,425 | 61.4 by 17.3 | 201.5 by 56.7 | | | | | | |
| 46 | Jordan-Hare Stadium | Auburn, Alabama | United States | | 1,006 | 10,830 | 58 by 17 | 190 by 57 | | 8.7 | 13HD LED video | Traditional | Daktronics | |
| 47 | Oracle Park | San Francisco | United States | | 995 | 10,710 | 21 by 47 | 70 by 153 | 2,160 × 4,672 pixels | | 10 mm pixel pitch | Traditional | Mitsubishi Electric Diamond Vision | |
| 48 | Nasdaq MarketSite | New York City | United States | | 936 | 10,080 | 26 by 37 | 84 by 120 | 2,080 × 2,964 pixels | | 12 mm SMD | Traditional | Panasonic | |
| 49 | Levi's Stadium | Santa Clara, California | United States | 2014 | 888.0 | 9,558 | 61 by 15 | 200 by 48 | 1,120 × 4,648 pixels | 5.21 | 13HD LED video | Combination (Traditional and Transparent) | Daktronics | |
| 50 | Prague Planetarium | Prague | Czech Republic | 2025 | 820.0 | 8,826 | 22 by 14 | 72 by 46 | 8,192 × 8,192 pixels | 45 | LED | | Cosm | |
| 51 | Kauffman Stadium | Kansas City, Missouri | United States | 2008 | 819 | 8,820 | 32 by 26 | 105 by 84 | 1,800 × 1,584 pixels | 2.85 | 16HD LED video | Traditional | Daktronics | |
| 52 | Traumpalast Leonberg Theater | Leonberg | Germany | 2021 | 814.8 | 8,770 | 38.8 by 21 | 127 by 69 | 4k | | IMAX Laser | Traditional | IMAX Corporation | |
| 53 | Ross–Ade Stadium | West Lafayette, Indiana | United States | 2020 | 792.59 | 8,531.4 | 45.82 by 17.30 | 150.33 by 56.75 | | | 10mm LED HDR | Traditional | | |
| 54 | Nissan Stadium | Nashville, Tennessee | United States | 2012 | 787.6 | 8,478 | 16 by 48 | 54 by 157 | 1,032 × 3,000 pixels | 3.10 | | Traditional | Lighthouse / ANC Sports | |
| 55 | Coors Field | Denver | United States | | 777.5 | 8,369 | | | | | | Traditional | | |
| 56 | Michigan Stadium (north end zone) | Ann Arbor, Michigan | United States | 2023 | 777 | 8,360 | 46 by 17 | 152 by 55 | between 4K and 8K | | LED | Traditional | Mitsubishi Electric Diamond Vision | |
| 57 | Michigan Stadium (south end zone) | Ann Arbor, Michigan | United States | 2023 | 777 | 8,360 | 46 by 17 | 152 by 55 | between 4K and 8K | | LED | Traditional | Mitsubishi Electric Diamond Vision | |
| 58 | Tokyo Racecourse | Fuchū, Tokyo | Japan | | 749.4 | 8,066 | 66 by 11 | 218 by 37 | | | | Traditional | Mitsubishi Electric Diamond Vision | |
| 59 | Rate Field | Chicago | United States | | 747 | 8,040 | 41 by 18 | 134 by 60 | 1,840 × 4,096 pixels | 7.54 | 10 mm | Traditional | Mitsubishi Electric Diamond Vision | |
| 60 | IMAX Melbourne | Melbourne | Australia | | 731.6 | 7,875 | 32 by 23 | 105 by 75 | 4K or 1570 Imax film | | | | | |
| 61 | Gaylord Family Oklahoma Memorial Stadium | Norman, Oklahoma | United States | | 729.2 | 7,849 | 14 by 51 | 47 by 167 | 1,092 × 3,892 pixels | 4.25 | | Traditional | Daktronics | |
| 62 | Rice–Eccles Stadium | Salt Lake City | United States | | 725.4 | 7,808 | 37 by 20 | 122 by 64 | 1,858 × 1,402 pixels | 2.6 | LED | Traditional | Prismview | |
| 63 | Truist Park | Atlanta | United States | | 722 | 7,770 | 36.9 by 19.6 | 120.9 by 64.3 | 2,304 × 1,224 pixels | | 16 mm Discreet | Traditional | Panasonic / Lighthouse | |
| 64 | Daegu Samsung Lions Park | Daegu | South Korea | | 720 | 7,750 | 36 by 20 | 118 by 67 | 2,400 × 1,360 pixels | 3.26 | | Traditional | Samik Display / Sony Korea | |
| 65 | Kyle Field (south end zone) | College Station, Texas | United States | | 711.7 | 7,661 | 14 by 50 | 47 by 163 | 1,092 × 3,808 pixels | 4.16 | 13HD LED video | Traditional | Daktronics | |
| 66 | Seminole Hard Rock Hotel & Casino Hollywood | Hollywood, Florida | United States | | 711 | 7,650 | 77.7 by 9.1 | 255 by 30 | 4,672 × 528 pixels | 2.467 | | Traditional | Prismview | |
| 67 | AMC Lincoln Square 13 & IMAX | New York City | United States | | 709.37 | 7,635.6 | 30.8 by 23.0 | 101 by 75.6 | | | IMAX with Laser | | | |
| 68 | Petco Park | San Diego | United States | | 702.748 | 7,564.32 | 18.7 by 37.7 | 61.2 by 123.6 | 1,224 × 2,472 pixels | 3.03 | | Traditional | Daktronics | |
| 69 | Citizens Bank Park | Philadelphia | United States | | 684.9 | 7,372 | 23 by 30 | 76 by 97 | 1,512 × 1,944 pixels | 2.94 | 15HD LED video | Traditional | Daktronics | |
| 70 | Darrell K Royal–Texas Memorial Stadium | Austin, Texas | United States | | 685 | 7,370 | 41 by 17 | 134 by 55 | 848 × 2,064 pixels | 1.75 | 20 mm LED video | Traditional | Daktronics | |
| 71 | Huntington Bank Field | Cleveland | United States | | 640 | 6,900 | 59 by 12 | 192 by 40 | | | | Traditional | Daktronics | |
| 72 | Hard Rock Stadium | Miami Gardens, Florida | United States | | 636 | 6,850 | 42 by 15 | 137 by 50 | 736 × 2,112 pixels | 1.55 | 20 mm LED video | Traditional | Daktronics | |
| 73 | Mosaic Stadium | Regina, Saskatchewan | Canada | | 635.8 | 6,844 | 36 by 18 | 118 by 58 | | | LED | Traditional | | |
| 74 | Doak Campbell Stadium | Tallahassee, Florida | United States | | 630.532 | 6,786.99 | 36.5 by 17.3 | 119.7 by 56.7 | 2,280 × 1,080 pixels | | 16 mm Discreet | Traditional | Panasonic | |
| 75 | Daikin Park | Houston | United States | | 622.1 | 6,696 | 38 by 16 | 124 by 54 | 2,472 × 1,080 pixels | 2.67 | 15HD LED video | Traditional | Daktronics | |
| 76 | Centro Internacional de Mercadeo | Guaynabo | Puerto Rico | | 619.1 | 6,664 | 17 by 36 | 56 by 119 | 896 × 1,904 pixels | 1.70 | 19 mm pixel pitch | Traditional | Watchfire | |
| 77 | Leonardo da Vinci–Fiumicino Airport Terminal 1 | Fiumicino | Italy | | 593.9 | 6,393 | 132.0 by 4.5 | 433 by 14.7 | 27,456 x 932 pixels | 25.6 | 4.8 mm pixel pitch 6000nits indoor | Traditional | Informasistemi / Liantronics | |
| 78 | LaVell Edwards Stadium | Provo, Utah | United States | | 584.2 | 6,288 | 15 by 40 | 48 by 131 | | | 10SMD LED video | Traditional | Daktronics | |
| 79 | Donald W. Reynolds Razorback Stadium | Fayetteville, Arkansas | United States | | 584.002 | 6,286.14 | 11.5 by 50.7 | 37.8 by 166.3 | 3,168 × 720 pixels | 2.28 | | Traditional | LSI industries with Click Effects | |
| 80 | Boone Pickens Stadium | Stillwater, Oklahoma | United States | | 572 | 6,160 | 17 by 34 | 56 by 110 | | Traditional | LSI industries with Click Effects | | | |
| 81 | Comerica Park | Detroit | United States | 2024 | 1,457.5 | 15,688 | | | | 14.1 | | Traditional | Daktronics | |
| 82 | Sha Tin Racecourse | Hong Kong | Hong Kong | | 558.0 | 6,006 | 70.4 by 7.9 | 231 by 26 | 400 × 3,520 pixels | 1.41 | | Traditional | Mitsubishi Electric Diamond Vision | |
| 83 | The Brooklyn Mirage at Avant Gardner | New York City | United States | 2022 | 560 | 6,000 | 61.0 by 9.1 | 200 by 30 | 14,976 × 1,920 pixels | 28.75 | 3.9mm LED / SMPTE 2110 | Traditional | Unilumin / Panasonic | |
| 84 | Los Angeles Memorial Coliseum | Los Angeles | United States | | 560 | 6,000 | 46 by 12 | 150 by 40 | 792 × 3,000 pixels | 2.38 | 15HD LED video | Traditional | Daktronics | |
| 85 | Yankee Stadium | New York City | United States | | 553.6 | 5,959 | 31 by 18 | 101 by 59 | | | | Traditional | Mitsubishi Electric Diamond Vision / ANC Sports | |
| 86 | Target Field | Minneapolis | United States | | 934.3 | 10,057 | 54.3 by 17.2 | 178 by 56.5 | | | | | Daktronics | |
| 87 | Sajik Baseball Stadium | Busan | South Korea | | 525.0 | 5,651 | 35 by 15 | 115 by 49 | 2,280 × 984 pixels | 2.24 | | Traditional | Daktronics | |
| 88 | Center Parc Stadium | Atlanta | United States | | 520 | 5,600 | 24 by 22 | 79 by 71 | | | | Traditional | Mitsubishi Electric Diamond Vision / ANC Sports | |
| 89 | Chase Field | Phoenix, Arizona | United States | | 890 | 9,600 | 19 by 46 | 63 by 152 | | 10 | | Traditional | Daktronics | |
| 90 | Highmark Stadium | Orchard Park, New York | United States | | 510.4 | 5,494 | 10.2 by 50.0 | 33.5 by 164 | | | X8 Display Technology | Traditional | Mitsubishi Electric Diamond Vision | |
| 91 | Mountain America Stadium | Tempe, Arizona | United States | 2017 | 503.4 | 5,419 | 15 by 34 | 48 by 113 | | | 16mm LED video | Traditional | ANC Sports | |
| 92 | Great American Ball Park | Cincinnati | United States | | 500.0 | 5,382 | 12 by 42 | 39 by 138 | 740 × 2,616 pixels | 1.94 | 16HD LED video | Traditional | Daktronics | |
| 93 | Casino Del Sol Stadium | Tucson, Arizona | United States | | 497.2 | 5,352 | 14 by 34 | 47 by 112 | 1728 × 720 pixels | 1.24 | | Traditional | CBS Outdoor with Click Effects | |
| 94 | Oakland Coliseum | Oakland, California | United States | | 485 | 5,220 | 11 by 44 | 36 by 145 | | | 13HD LED video | Traditional | Daktronics | |
| 95 | Davis Wade Stadium | Starkville, Mississippi | United States | | 484.2 | 5,212 | 34 by 14 | 111 by 47 | 720 × 1,280 pixels | 0.92 | | Traditional | Capturion with Click Effects | |
| 96 | Ohio Stadium | Columbus, Ohio | United States | | 483.8 | 5,208 | 13 by 38 | 42 by 124 | | | 16 mm LED SMD video | Traditional | Panasonic / Lighthouse | |
| 97 | Jones AT&T Stadium | Lubbock, Texas | United States | 2024 | 481.765 | 5,185.68 | 42.5 by 11.3 | 139.4 by 37.2 | | | 10 mm pixel pitch | Traditional | Daktronics | |
| 98 | Lincoln Financial Field | Philadelphia | United States | | 481.6 | 5,184 | 58.5 by 8.2 | 192 by 27 | 5,856 × 816 pixels | | 10 mm SMD | Traditional | Panasonic / Lighthouse | |
| 99 | LoanDepot Park | Miami | United States | | 472.0 | 5,081 | 31 by 15 | 101 by 50 | 1,008 × 2,016 pixels | 2.03 | 15HD LED video | Traditional | Daktronics | |
| 100 | Huntington Bank Stadium | Minneapolis | United States | | 470.0 | 5,059 | 33 by 15 | 108 by 48 | 900 × 2,040 pixels | 1.84 | 16HD LED video | Traditional | Daktronics | |
| 101 | Globe Life Park in Arlington | Arlington, Texas | United States | | 468 | 5,040 | 37 by 13 | 120 by 42 | 840 × 2,352 pixels | 1.98 | 15HD LED video | Traditional | Daktronics | |
| 102 | McLane Stadium | Waco, Texas | United States | | 467.2 | 5,029 | 14 by 33 | 47 by 107 | 1,080 × 1,920 pixels | | 15HD LED video | Traditional | Daktronics | |
| 103 | Vaught–Hemingway Stadium | University, Mississippi | United States | | 466.0 | 5,016 | 31.9 by 14.6 | 104.5 by 48 | 1,120 × 2,436 pixels | | 13HD LED video | Traditional | Daktronics | |
| 104 | Cobo Center | Detroit | United States | | 450 | 4,800 | 48.8 by 9.1 | 160 by 30 | | 3.81 | | Semi-transparent | | |
| 105 | The Colosseum at Caesars Palace | Paradise, Nevada | United States | | 450 | 4,800 | 37 by 12 | 120 by 40 | | | | Traditional | Mitsubishi Electric Diamond Vision | |
| 106 | Nationals Park | Washington, D.C. | United States | | 441.0 | 4,747 | 31 by 14 | 101 by 47 | | | | Traditional | Mitsubishi Electric Diamond Vision / ANC Sports | |
| 107 | Randwick Racecourse | Sydney | Australia | | 429.5 | 4,623 | 11 by 39 | 36 by 128 | 720 × 2,568 pixels | 1.85 | 15 mm LED video | Traditional | Daktronics | |
| 108 | Neyland Stadium | Knoxville, Tennessee | United States | | 426.2 | 4,588 | 38 by 11 | 124 by 37 | | | | Traditional | Mitsubishi Electric Diamond Vision | |
| 109 | National Arts Centre | Ottawa | Canada | | 419 | 4,510 | 25 by 17 | 82 by 55 | | | 16 mm SMD LED | Transparent | ClearLED | |
| 110 | Williams–Brice Stadium | Columbia, South Carolina | United States | | 414.7 | 4,464 | 38 by 11 | 124 by 36 | 840 × 2,884 pixels | 2.42 | 13HD LED video | Traditional | Daktronics | |
| 111 | Lane Stadium | Blacksburg, Virginia | United States | | 403.4 | 4,342 | 29.2 by 13.8 | 95.8 by 45.4 | | | 19 mm LED SMD video | Traditional | Panasonic / Lighthouse | |
| 112 | Camp Randall Stadium | Madison, Wisconsin | United States | | 396.8 | 4,271 | | | | | | Traditional | Daktronics | |
| 113 | Canvas Stadium | Fort Collins, Colorado | United States | | 393.3 | 4,233 | 25.6 by 15.4 | 84 by 50.4 | 1,600 × 960 pixels | 1.54 | 16 mm Discreet | Traditional | Panasonic | |
| 114 | Westgate Super Book | Winchester, Nevada | United States | | 386.9 | 4,165 | 67.2 by 5.8 | 220.5 by 18.9 | 26,880 × 2,304 pixels | 62 | 2.5 mm LED SMD video | Traditional | Christie Digital | |
| 115 | Acrisure Bounce House | Orlando, Florida | United States | | 381.3 | 4,104 | 35 by 11 | 114 by 36 | | | | Traditional | Daktronics | |
| 116 | Ben Hill Griffin Stadium | Gainesville, Florida | United States | | 372.7 | 4,012 | 9.0 by 41.5 | 29.5 by 136 | 560 × 2,592 pixels | 1.45 | 16HD LED video | Traditional | Daktronics | |
| 117 | Wrigley Field | Chicago | United States | | 371 | 3,990 | 13 by 29 | 42 by 95 | | | 13HD LED video | Traditional | Daktronics | |
| 118 | Memorial Stadium | Lincoln, Nebraska | United States | | 366.9 | 3,949 | 10.2 by 35.8 | 33.6 by 117.6 | | | | Traditional | Mitsubishi Electric Diamond Vision | |
| 119 | Kyle Field (north end zone) | College Station, Texas | United States | | 359.4 | 3,869 | 16 by 22 | 53 by 73 | | | | Traditional | Mitsubishi Electric Diamond Vision | |
| 120 | Truist Field at Wake Forest | Winston-Salem, North Carolina | United States | | 359.0 | 3,864 | 13 by 28 | 42 by 92 | 840 × 1,800 pixels | 1.51 | 15HD LED video | Traditional | Daktronics | |
| 121 | Fenway Park | Boston | United States | | 350 | 3,800 | 30 by 12 | 100 by 38 | | | | Traditional | LG Electronics / ANC Sports | |
| 122 | Perth Stadium | Burswood, Western Australia | Australia | | 340.79 | 3,668.2 | 33.3 by 10.2 | 109.2 by 33.6 | | | 15 mm HD pixel spacing | Traditional | Daktronics | |

== See also ==
- Jumbotron
- Scoreboard § Video board animation
