= Adirei HaTorah =

Annual Torah study event in Pennsylvania, US

Adirei HaTorah אדירי התורה
- Venue: Wells Fargo Center / Xfinity Mobile Arena, Philadelphia, Pennsylvania
- Inaugurated: June 12, 2022
- Founder: Lazer Scheiner
- Organiser: Beth Medrash Govoha
- Website: adireihatorah.com

Adirei HaTorah (Hebrew: אדירי התורה, lit. 'the Greats of the Torah') is an annual event held in Philadelphia, Pennsylvania, United States, to honor Torah study, particularly of Beth Medrash Govoha. The event was founded in 2022 and consists of live music, dancing, and speeches by rabbis. Attendance has grown from approximately 25,000 at its inception to over 35,000 across two venues in 2026.

== History ==
Adirei HaTorah was founded in 2022 by philanthropist Lazer Scheiner, after donors pledged to raise the stipend of the kollel of Beth Medrash Govoha to $13,500 annually. This raise caused the kollel's annual budget to rise from $17.8 million to $61.4 million. To commemorate this increase, Scheiner organized the Adirei HaTorah event, to honor those who study Torah. The event has been held annually since, growing each year in size and scope. In 2025, an additional raise to the kollel stipend was announced during the event.

== Events ==
=== 2022 ===
The first event was held on June 12, 2022. It was originally scheduled to be held at the CURE Insurance Arena in Trenton, New Jersey, however after it was sold out it was switched to the Wells Fargo Center in Philadelphia, which is three times the size. It was attended by approximately 25,000 people.

=== 2023 ===
The second event took place on June 4, 2023, also at the Wells Fargo Center. The keynote address was given by Rabbi Elya Chaim Swerdloff. Rabbis from Israel attended, including Rabbi Dov Lando and Rabbi Meir Zvi Bergman, who had received a psak from Rabbi Simcha Bunim Cohen allowing him to attend despite being in the middle of shiva following his son's death.

=== 2024 ===
The third event was held on June 16, 2024, at the Wells Fargo Center, with over 25,000 people in attendance. Prior to the main event, a gala was held on June 8 for representatives from nearly 350 synagogues in the Lakewood area, who coordinated local ticket sales. The dais seated approximately 800 roshei yeshiva, rabbonim, and roshei chaburah. Seats on the arena floor were reserved for long-serving yungeleit of Beth Medrash Govoha and could not be purchased.

The keynote address from Israel was given by Rabbi Moshe Hillel Hirsch, rosh yeshiva of Yeshivas Slabodka in Bnei Brak, who spoke in English. Rabbi Ephraim Wachsman, rosh yeshiva of Yeshiva Meor Yitzchok of Monsey, also addressed the gathering. Brief video remarks were delivered by Rabbi Yosef Mermelstein, rosh yeshiva of Yeshivas Novominsk, and a video was shown of Rabbi Elya Ber Wachtfogel, rosh yeshiva of Yeshiva Gedolah of South Fallsburg. Beth Medrash Govoha CEO Yosef Heinemann reflected on the tens of millions of dollars raised in the three years since the campaign's inauguration.

A notable moment was the surprise appearance of Rabbi Shmuel Kamenetsky, the 99-year-old rosh yeshiva of the Talmudical Yeshiva of Philadelphia, marking his first public appearance since suffering a stroke in May 2023.

A Siyum HaShas on Talmud Bavli and Talmud Yerushalmi, completed b'iyun by the yungeleit of Beth Medrash Govoha, was held, with the Hadran recited by Rabbi Yisroel Neuman. The Kaddish was recited by Rabbi Moshe Salomon, son of the late mashgiach of Beth Medrash Govoha, Rabbi Matisyahu Salomon, in whose memory a video tribute was shown. A historical video depicted the transmission of Torah over the past two centuries, including audio of Rabbi Moshe Shmuel Shapiro and remarks from Rabbi Mordechai Gifter.

=== 2025 ===
The fourth event was held on June 8, 2025, at the Wells Fargo Center. The keynote address from Israel was delivered by Rabbi Ezriel Auerbach, one of the most prominent poskim in Israel, who arrived in the United States specifically for the event. Rabbi Shmuel Kamenetsky again made a surprise appearance. Following the event, Rabbi Auerbach paid a personal visit to Rabbi Kamenetsky.

During the event, Rabbi Malkiel Kotler announced an additional raise to the kollel stipend. The event featured a communal Siyum HaShas, in addition to multiple completions by the yeshiva's yungeleit. A preparatory Melava Malka was held beforehand, uniting nearly 350 roshei chaburah from Beth Medrash Govoha.

=== 2026 ===
The fifth event was held on May 31, 2026. For the first time, the event used two venues simultaneously: the primary location at the Xfinity Mobile Arena (formerly the Wells Fargo Center) in Philadelphia, and a satellite location at the CURE Insurance Arena in Trenton, New Jersey, connected via live feed. Tickets for the main venue sold out within four hours of going on sale, prompting the addition of the satellite venue, which itself saw 50% of its tickets sold within 24 hours. More than 35,000 people attended across both locations.

A potential scheduling conflict with the Philadelphia 76ers' NBA playoffs was averted when the New York Knicks swept the 76ers in the second round of the playoffs, eliminating any overlap with the arena booking.

The special guest from Israel was Rabbi Yitzchok Soloveitchik. Addresses were given by Rabbi Aryeh Malkiel Kotler and Rabbi Dovid Schustal. The keynote address was delivered by Rabbi Uri Deutsch. Rabbi Yisroel Neuman recited the Hadran for the Siyum HaShas on Talmud Bavli and Talmud Yerushalmi, and Rabbi Yeruchom Olshin led Kabolas Ol Malchus Shomayim. A tribute video was shown in memory of Rabbi Shimon Frank, a 26-year-old avreich who died earlier that year following an illness.
