= Artistic video wall =

Artistic, mosaic or architectural video walls are video walls that do not follow a more traditional grid or matrix pattern. Instead of the more common configuration of 2x2 or 3x3, artistic video walls allow users to display a single image, video or display canvas across displays arranged ad hoc and at different angles. This allows users to design unusual configurations: EX. layouts that attract attention, or serve as a unique artistic feature in a public space.

== Source rotation ==
The simplest approach to a 'unique' video wall is to rotate the source content which allows end users to rotate the actual displays. By using a mix of portrait and landscape displays this allows users to deploy a video wall that is not a simple matrix, however this approach is limited to keeping all displays at the same angle.

== Any angle rotation ==
Any angle rotation allows individual displays to rotate to any angle allowing greater flexibility in the video wall lay out.

== Mix of display types and sizes ==
An additional feature of some video walls is the ability to mix display sizes and types. Instead of requiring a set of uniform displays, users can mix and match displays of different sizes and aspect ratio.

== Artistic video wall comparison ==
Features	Sony Ziris	Planar	Userful	Datapath	Monitors AnyWhere - USB Wall	TVOne
Rotation Options	Any Angle	Any Angle	Any Angle	90 Degree Rotation of Individual Displays	Any Angle	Any Angle
Mix Display Sizes/Aspect Ratio	Displays must be uniform aspect ratio	Limited to use of 22”, 46” and 55” Planar displays	Use any display of any size/aspect ratio	Unknown	Use any display of any size/aspect ratio	Unknown
Use Any Displays	Yes	Requires use of Planar display	Yes	Yes	Yes	Yes
Max Source Content	Unlimited	4096 x 2160	7680 x 4320	4096x4096	7680 x 4320	4096 x 2160
Real-Time	No	Yes	Yes	Yes	Yes	Yes
Proprietary Hardware	Yes (Sony PlayStation)	Yes, Planar Displays	No, software only	Yes, requires Datapath player	No, software only	Requires Video Wall Processor from TVOne
