= Sony Ziris =

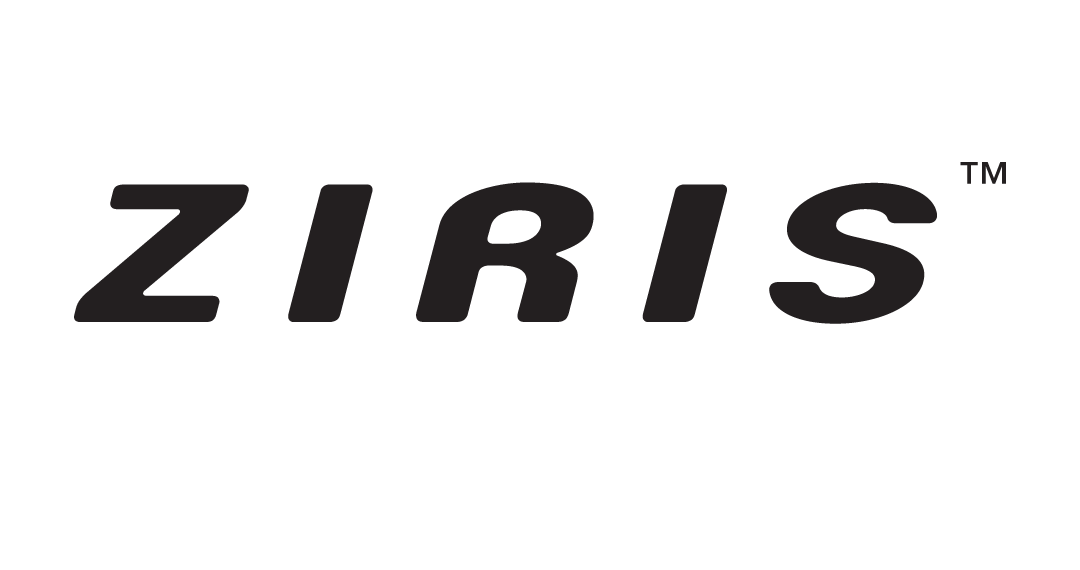

- A screenshot of the typical interface on Ziris Create
- Developer: Sony Broadcast & Professional Research Laboratories
- Stable release: 7.0 / 15 June 2010; 16 years ago
- Operating system: Microsoft Windows
- Type: Digital signage software
- License: Proprietary
- Website: Sony Professional

Sony Ziris is a professional digital signage software application manufactured by Sony Broadcast & Professional Research Laboratories, in Basingstoke, United Kingdom. It was introduced in 2008. The 2010 version claims to manage up to 5,000 displays in a video wall. It works on heterogeneous videowalls comprising panels of different sizes and orientations, or hung at different angles.

It is used at the Sony Centre for the Performing Arts (O'Keefe Centre) in Toronto, and a number of sport stadiums, for instance at the Emirates Stadium of the Arsenal Football Club (439 displays), or the American Airlines Arena of the Miami Heat, and some cinemas like those from the Vue network.

For Ziris Canvas, the displays are connected through customized PlayStation 3s running Ziris View, which are networked and controlled by a web GUI-based management software, Ziris Manage. It's a modular application developed with Java technology.

== Product family ==
The Ziris family currently consists of 3 different product ranges:

- Ziris Lite (entry level signage)
- Ziris Professional (professional signage)
- Ziris Canvas (video wall signage)

== Product outline ==
The software package consists of several modules each playing a different role in the operation of the application

- Ziris Create (for content creation and management)
- Ziris Manage (for display status & control)
- Ziris Transfer / Edge (for content distribution)
- Ziris View (for playback of the output)

These components are used through the 3 different ranges.

Ziris Create allows for a user to add content to a centralised content library and create play lists that are the essence of a Digital Signage system. It has a folder based structure thus allowing the user to categorise and organise their materials within the system. It includes a play list editor that allows positioning of these elements in certain areas of the screen as well as layering the elements on top, or below of each other.

Ziris Manage provides a list of all displays & players on a signage network that can be managed by the product, allowing the user to see what is happening on screen and enable them to control the display by switching power, volume or inputs.

There are two different distribution modules available going by the name of Ziris Transfer and Edge. The main difference in architecture between the two is the way the content is distributed to the players. Within Ziris Transfer, a server is embedded operating according to the FTP structure, thereby caching files and pushing them out to the players on the network. When using Ziris Edge, the opposite is achieved by using pull technology instead. By making the player contacting the main server at intervals it is possible to broadcast Digital Signage contents to hard to reach places, through intermittent networks or mobile locations. This enables the usage of Digital Signage in public transport or other mobile locations.

== Awards ==
Sony has been awarded with the bronze European POPAI award of 2009 in the category "Supports Digital Innovators" with the Ziris Canvas product. In 2010 Sony received the "Apex Silver" award from the DSE organisation for their project at the American Airlines Arena of the Miami Heat.
