= Jumbotron =

Large-screen television

A jumbotron, sometimes referred to as jumbovision or a jumbo screen, is a video display using large-screen television technology (video wall).

The original technology was developed in the early 1980s by Mitsubishi Electric (using the name Diamond Vision) and Sony, which registered JumboTron as a trademark in 1985. It is typically used in sports stadiums and concert venues to show team statistics, close-up shots of an event or even other sporting events occurring simultaneously. The same jumbotron technology is used in outdoor public places, often for advertising purposes (such as Times Square, for example).

== History and development ==
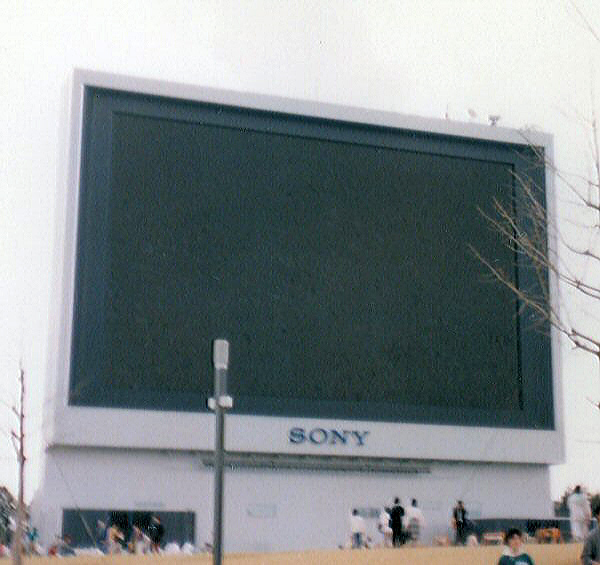
The Sony JumboTron made its debut at World's Fair 1985.

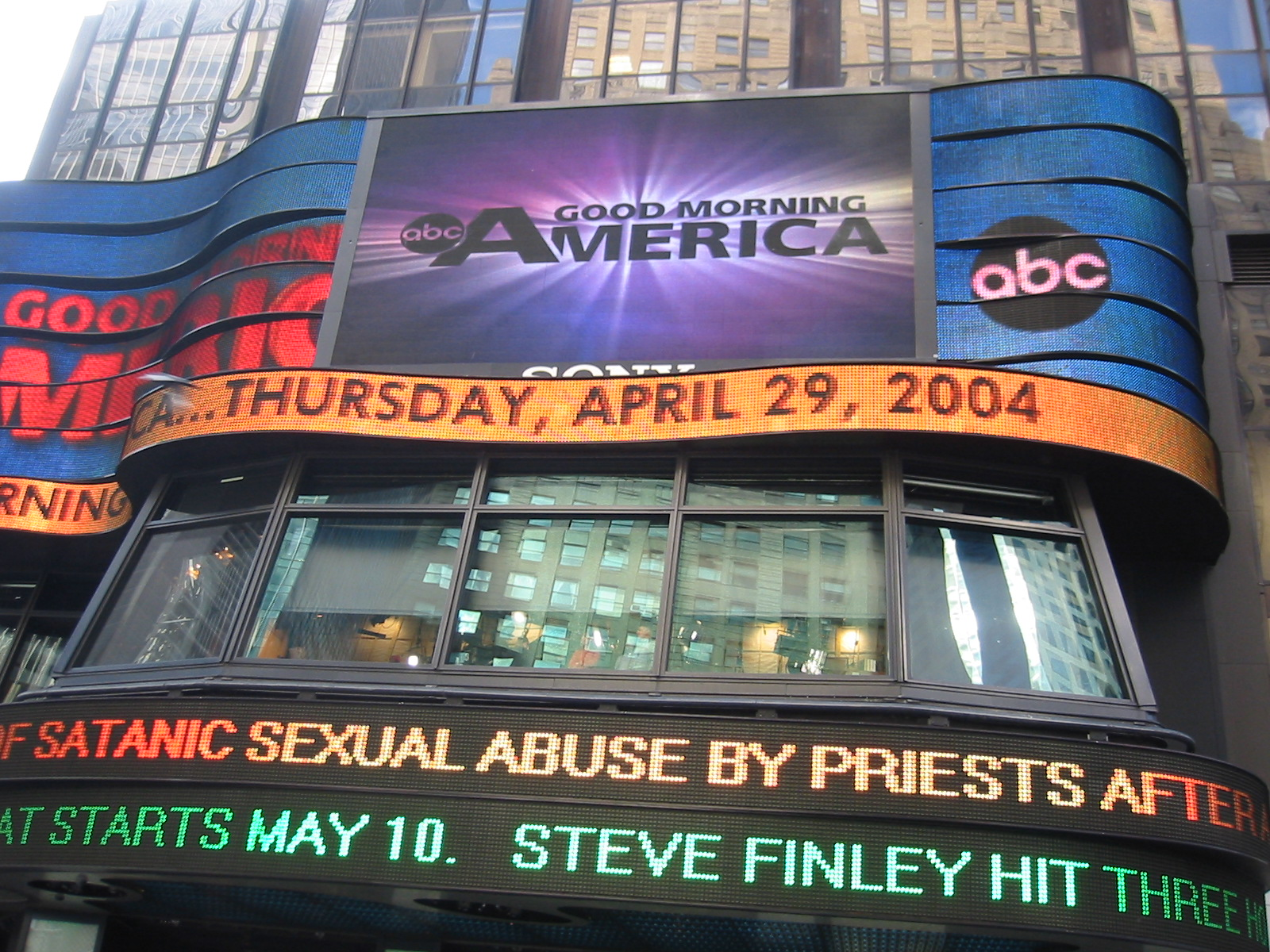
The "Super Sign" on ABC's Times Square Studios facility was a very large Sony JumboTron. This unit was later replaced with a Mitsubishi Electric LED display.

The jumbotron was invented in Japan during the early 1980s, but there is a dispute between two rival Japanese companies, Mitsubishi Electric and Sony, over its invention. In 1980, Mitsubishi introduced the first large-scale video board, the Diamond Vision, which was a large screen using cathode-ray tube technology similar to traditional tube televisions. The first demonstration of the technology was during the 1980 Major League Baseball All-Star Game in Dodger Stadium, Los Angeles.

The first Jumbotrons used cathode-ray tube based technology, in which several sub-pixels were integrated into a module made of glass with a vacuum inside, with the shape of a block, in which each subpixel was individually controllable (addressable) with each subpixel acting as a flood beam cathode-ray tube Eventually this technology was replaced with LED technology.

Panasonic introduced Astro Vision, which was based on fluorescent discharge tube technology, and together with the other two companies, these were the only players in the large-screen industry.

In 1985, the term "JumboTron" was coined by Sony for its large-scale video board. The JumboTron was the brand name for the large-scale video boards originally manufactured by Sony and is recognized as one of the largest non-projection video displays ever manufactured. Sony creative director Yasuo Kuroki, who previously helped create the Walkman, is credited with the development of the JumboTron. It was introduced at the Expo '85 held in May 1985 at Tsukuba, Ibaraki. It had a display resolution of 450,000 pixels, using a new proprietary Sony technology called the Trini-lite. It was a microprocessor-based light bulb developed by one of Kuroki's colleagues, chief Betamax engineer Yuji Watanabe. Trini-lite technology allowed screen clarity and computer control, laying the foundation for the first Sony Jumbotrons.

In December 1986, the San Antonio Spurs unveiled the first indoor arena JumboTron scoreboard at the now-demolished HemisFair Arena.

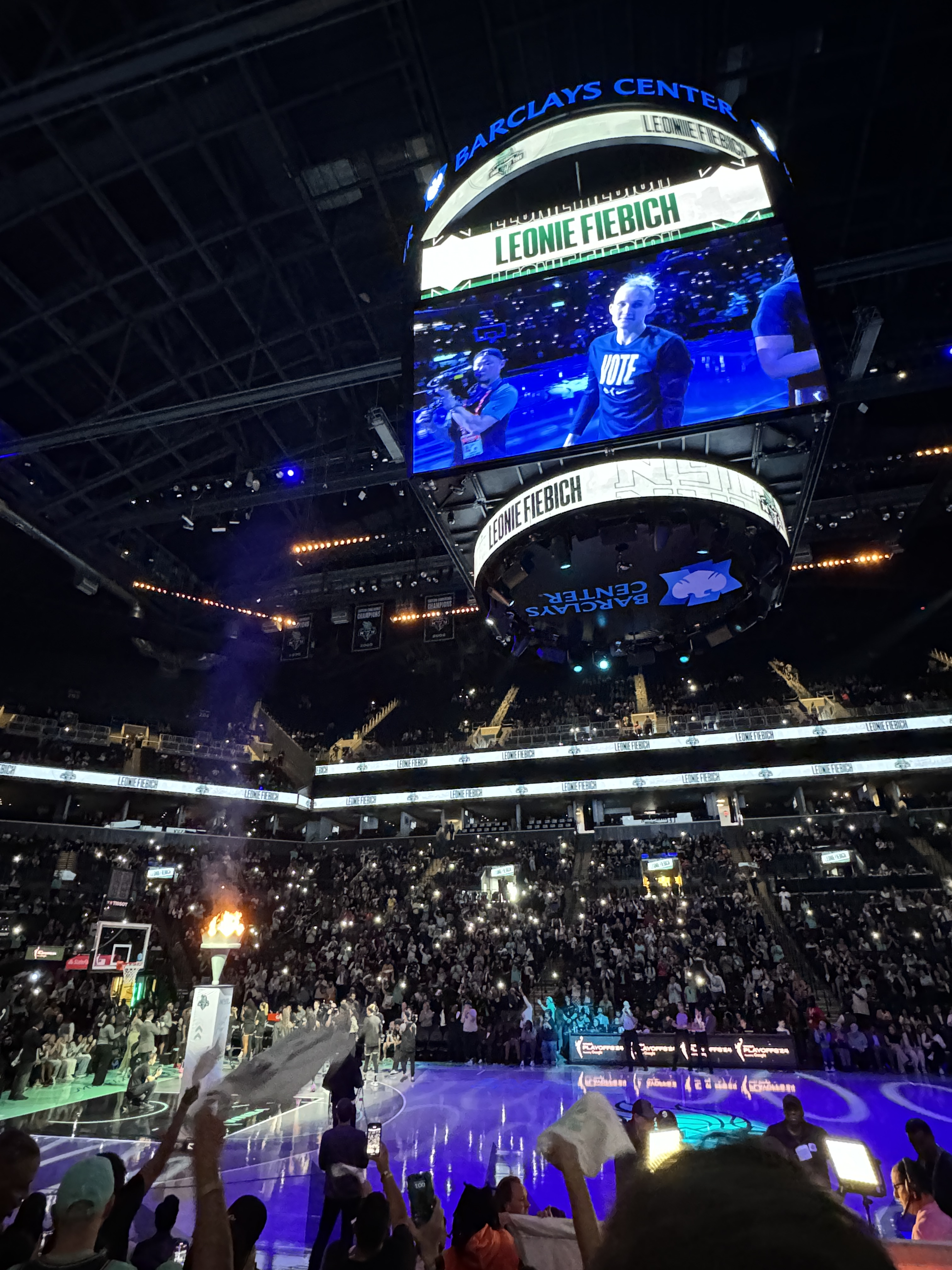
Starting lineup players are introduced on the jumbotron at Barclays Center in the New York City borough of Brooklyn, during a WNBA Basketball game

While the JumboTron and similar large-screen displays are physically large, they ranged from low to medium display resolutions. While the original Sony JumboTron in 1985 had a 450,000-pixel resolution, comparable to standard-definition televisions of that era, certain later models had lower resolutions. The JumboTron at the now-demolished Tampa Stadium in Tampa, Florida, measured 30 feet (9.1 m) diagonally, with a resolution of only 240x192 pixels, below VHS resolution. Screen size since then varies depending on the venue. The display introduced in 1985 was 40 by 25 metres (131 ft × 82 ft). Newer, LED-based large screens have resolutions that are an order of magnitude greater than the early JumboTron resolution at a fraction of the cost. For example, the much publicized center-hung video board in the Dallas Cowboys' AT&T Stadium is 72 by 160 feet (22 m × 49 m), displaying HDTV at 1920 x 1080 resolution, 45 times more pixels.

The largest JumboTron in use was located at SkyDome (now Rogers Centre) in Toronto, Ontario, and measured 10 by 35 metres (33 ft × 115 ft), with a resolution of 672 × 200 pixels, or 134,400 pixels. Its cost was US$17 million; by comparison, a similar-sized LED system sold today would cost around $3 million. The Rogers Centre JumboTron was replaced in 2005 by a Daktronics ProStar as part of a stadium revitalization project.

== Purpose ==
Originally, JumboTrons solely displayed the scores of the games via numerical displays. This later evolved into instant replays being shown for the benefit of fans within the stadiums or arena, and in modern day, social media is heavily integrated, with fans being urged to post on various social media platforms to then have their content appear on the JumboTron screen.

Sony JumboTron's were the world's first mobile screens and concert screens. Big Mo was the first portable video screen and Genesis used the first portable video screens for concert tours in the mid-1990s.

== Specifications of production and design ==
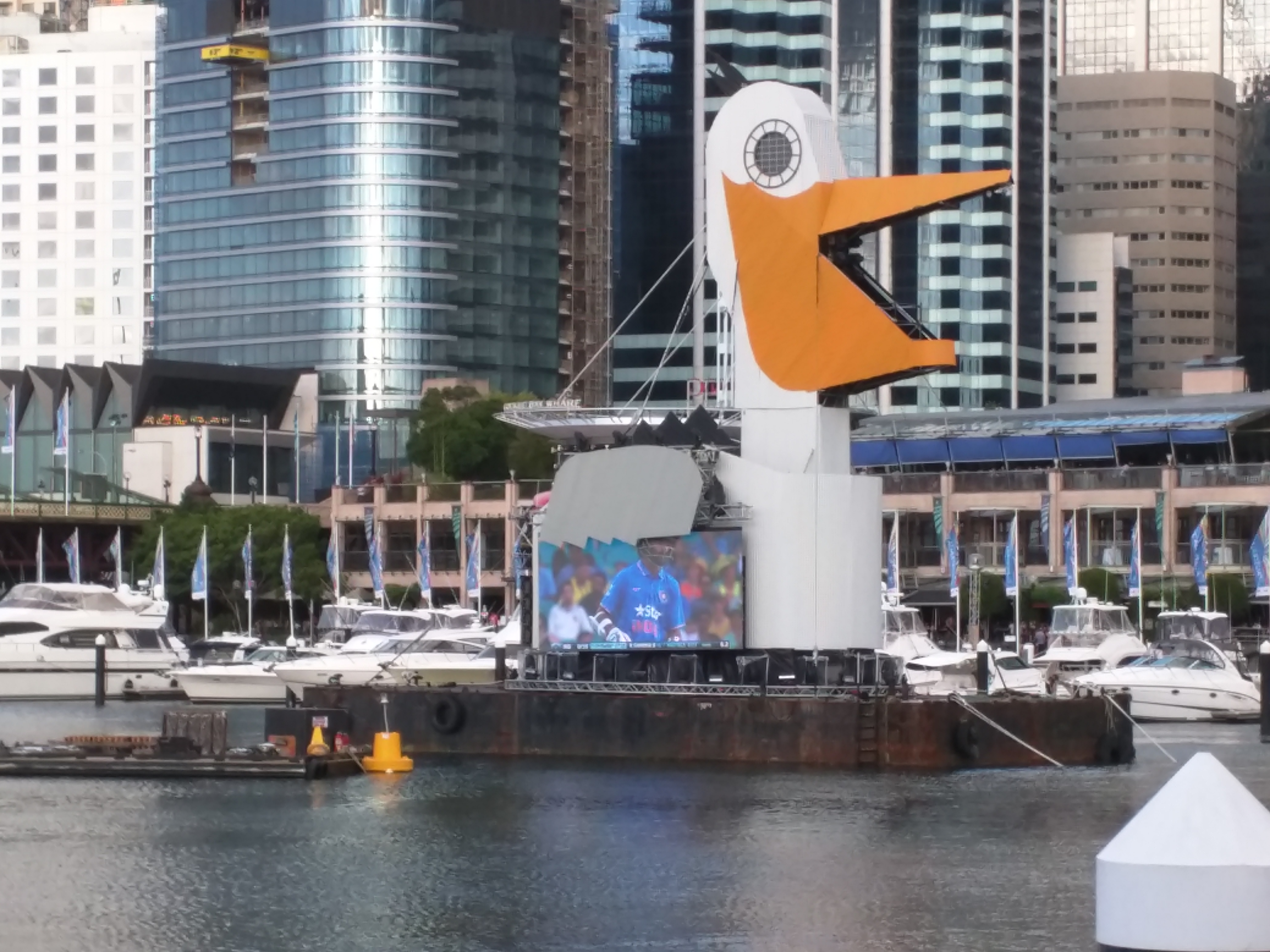
An LED jumbotron display aboard a pelican barge

Originally, the JumboTron was not an LED display, since blue LEDs were unavailable at the time, and the only green LEDs available were of the traditional yellow-green variety, which were unsuitable for an RGB display. Each display consisted of multiple modules composed of 16 or more small flood-beam cathode-ray tubes (CRTs), each of which included from 2 to 16 pixels composed of red, green, and blue phosphors. Sony displayed one of the earliest versions at the Expo '85 World's Fair in Tsukuba. Eventually, JumboTron systems adopted LED technology as blue and pure green LEDs were developed. LED-based systems have about ten times the lifespan of CRT-based systems, a key reason for the change.

== Genericized trademark ==
Although JumboTron was a registered trademark owned by the Sony Corporation, Sony stopped manufacturing the devices under that name in 2001 and the word Jumbotron has since become a genericized trademark. An Illinois-based company called Watchfire Signs filed for the US trademark on February 17, 2023. They did not get the trademark as the United States Patent and Trademark Office marked the filing as abandoned.

== See also ==
- Scoreboard § Video board animation
- LED display
- Trinitron

Displays similar to the JumboTron include:

- Barco LED Screens
- Daktronics ProStar
- Mitsubishi Electric Diamond Vision
- Panasonic AstroVision
- Philips Vidiwall
- Toshiba TechnoRainbow
- Eidophor video projector
