= Citigroup Tower =

Skyscraper in Shanghai, China

Coordinates: 31.236025°N 121.495667°E

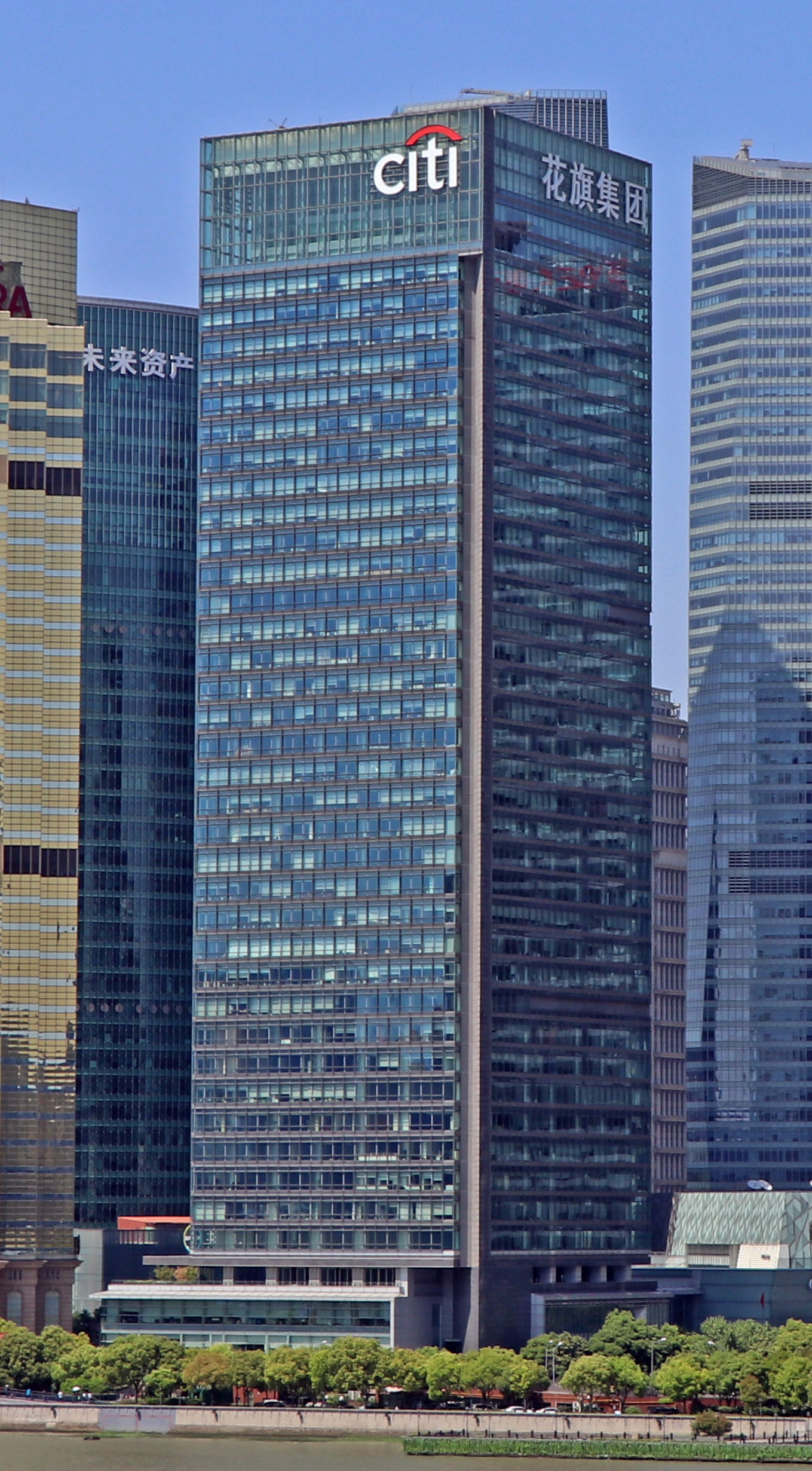
Citigroup Tower in 2019

The Citigroup Tower is a 180 m, 42 storey high skyscraper in the Pudong financial district of Shanghai, China, completed in 2005. It is the headquarters building of the Citibank (China) Company Limited.

The video screen on one of its sides is the 8th largest in the world.

== See also ==
- List of tallest buildings in Shanghai
