= Citibank (China) =

Franchise subsidiary of Citigroup

Citibank (China) Company Limited
- Company type: Subsidiary
- Industry: Banking, financial services
- Founded: April 2, 2007; 19 years ago
- Headquarters: Citigroup Tower, Shanghai
- Products: Institutional banking
- Website: www.citibank.com.cn/sim/english/index.htm

Citibank (China) Company Limited ("CCCL") (Chinese: 花旗银行(中国)有限公司) is the division of Citigroup that operates in China. It currently only serves institutional businesses. It is headquartered in Citigroup Tower in Shanghai.

== History ==
Citibank was the first U.S. bank to operate in China; its predecessor, International Banking Corp., opened an office in 1902. It ceased operations upon the start of World War II but resumed operations in 1985.

In 2007, the bank was one of the first to receive approval for incorporation in China and in August 2007, the bank received approval to issue debit cards.

In 2023, Citigroup sold its consumer business in China, which had $3.6 billion in assets under management, to HSBC.
