= Xfinity Mobile Arena =

Multi-purpose arena in Philadelphia, Pennsylvania, United States

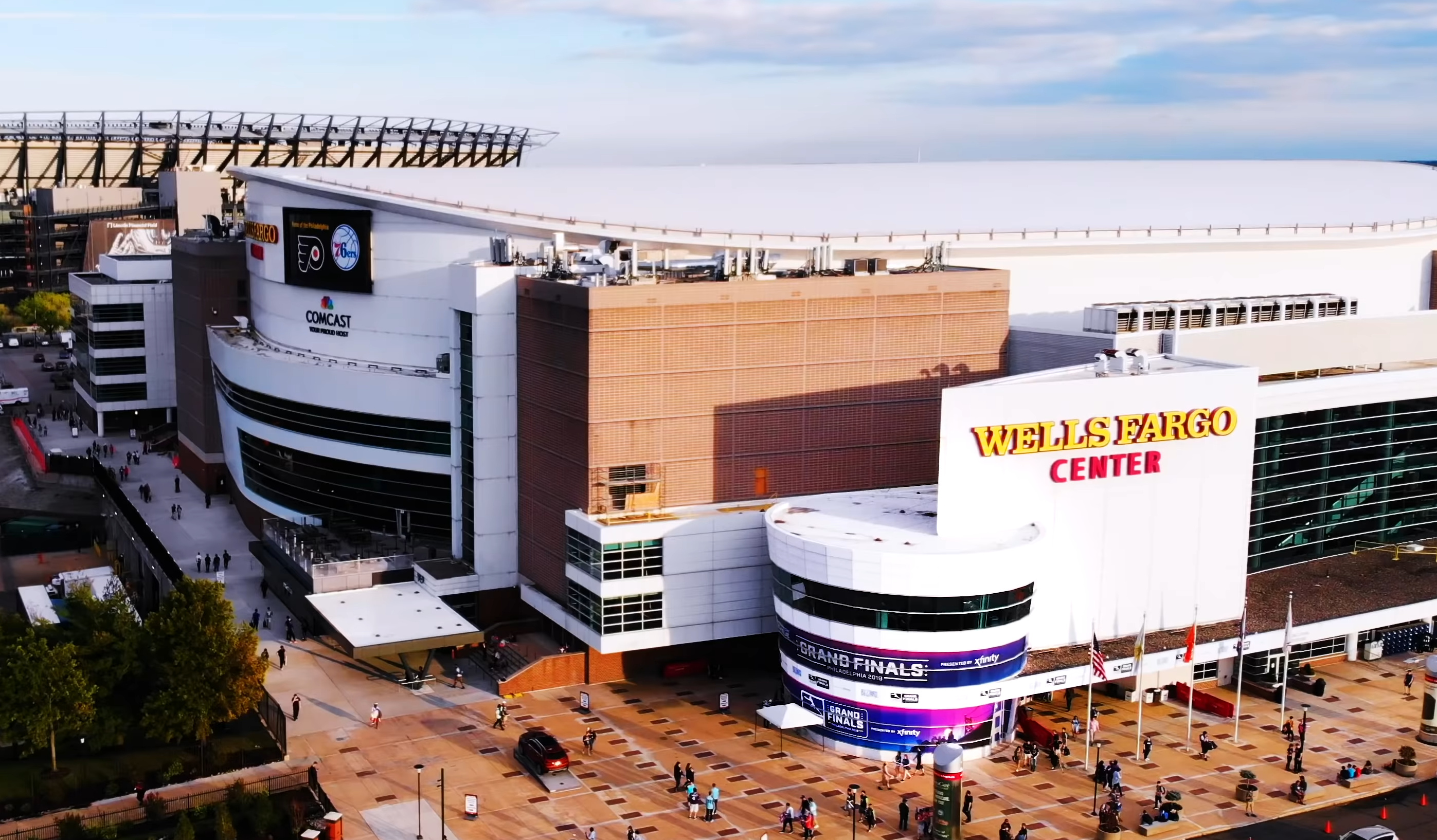
- Xfinity Mobile Arena, then named Wells Fargo Center, in 2019

- Location in Philadelphia Location in Pennsylvania Location in the United States
- Former names: CoreStates Center (1996–1998); First Union Center (1998–2003); Wachovia Center (2003–2010); Wells Fargo Center (2010–2025)
- Address: 3601 South Broad Street
- Location: Philadelphia, Pennsylvania, U.S.
- Coordinates: 39°54′4″N 75°10′19″W
- Owner: Comcast Spectacor
- Operator: OVG360
- Capacity: Basketball: 20,478 (21,305 with standing room); Concerts: 21,000; Ice hockey/Lacrosse: 19,173 (20,000 with standing room)
- Record attendance: Basketball: 21,490 (January 30, 2026 – Unrivaled); Ice hockey: 20,327 (Game 6 of 2010 Stanley Cup Final)
- Public transit: SEPTA Metro: (NRG); SEPTA bus: 4, 45, 68

Construction
- Groundbreaking: September 14, 1994
- Opened: August 12, 1996
- Cost: US$210 million ($456 million in 2025 dollars)
- Architect: Ellerbe Becket
- Project manager: Fox Management Company
- Structural engineers: Walter P Moore; Bernard Schwartz & Associates
- Services engineer: Flack & Kurtz
- General contractor: L.F. Driscoll Co.

Tenants
- Philadelphia Flyers (NHL) (1996–present); Philadelphia 76ers (NBA) (1996–present); Villanova Wildcats men's basketball (NCAA) (1996–present) (Note: Villanova utilized the venue full-time 2017–2018, part-time in other years.); Philadelphia Phantoms (AHL) (1996–2009) (Note: Phantoms utilized the venue full-time 2004–2005, part-time in other years.); Philadelphia Wings (NLL) (1997–2014, 2018–2026); Philadelphia Soul (AFL) (2004–2008, 2011–2019)

Website
- www.xfinitymobilearena.com

Xfinity Mobile Arena is a multi-purpose indoor arena located in Philadelphia, Pennsylvania, United States. It serves as the home of the Philadelphia Flyers of the National Hockey League (NHL) and the Philadelphia 76ers of the National Basketball Association (NBA). The arena lies at the southwest corner of the South Philadelphia Sports Complex, which includes Lincoln Financial Field, Citizens Bank Park, and Stateside Live!.

The arena, initially called Spectrum II during planning, was completed in 1996 to replace the Spectrum as the home arena of the 76ers and Flyers, on the former site of John F. Kennedy Stadium at a cost of $210 million, largely privately financed (though the city and state helped to pay for the local infrastructure). It is owned by Comcast Spectacor, which also owns the Flyers. Comcast Spectacor managed the arena until 2021, when the Oak View Group acquired Comcast Spectacor's Spectra division, and with it management of the arena, Citizens Bank Park, home of the Philadelphia Phillies and Lincoln Financial Field, home of the Philadelphia Eagles. Since opening, it has been known by a number of different names through naming rights deals and bank mergers, including CoreStates Center from 1996 to 1998, First Union Center from 1998 to 2003, Wachovia Center from 2003 to 2010, and Wells Fargo Center from 2010 to 2025. Naming rights were originally held by CoreStates Financial Corporation, which was acquired by First Union, which later also purchased Wachovia National Bank to rename itself Wachovia Corporation; the combined company was acquired by Wells Fargo in 2008.

In addition to hosting home games for its main tenants, the arena has been the site of a number of other notable athletic events, including games of the 1997 and 2010 Stanley Cup Finals, three games of the 2001 NBA Finals, and various collegiate events for the National Collegiate Athletic Association (NCAA). The arena has hosted two political conventions, hosting the 2000 Republican National Convention and 2016 Democratic National Convention. The arena is a regular venue for concerts and WWE events.

On January 12, 2025, Comcast Spectacor, Harris Blitzer Sports & Entertainment and the City of Philadelphia announced a deal to replace the arena with a new $1.3 billion privately financed arena to open by 2030. Comcast Spectacor and Harris Blitzer Sports & Entertainment will jointly own the new arena. Demolition will follow once the new project is complete.

== Naming rights ==
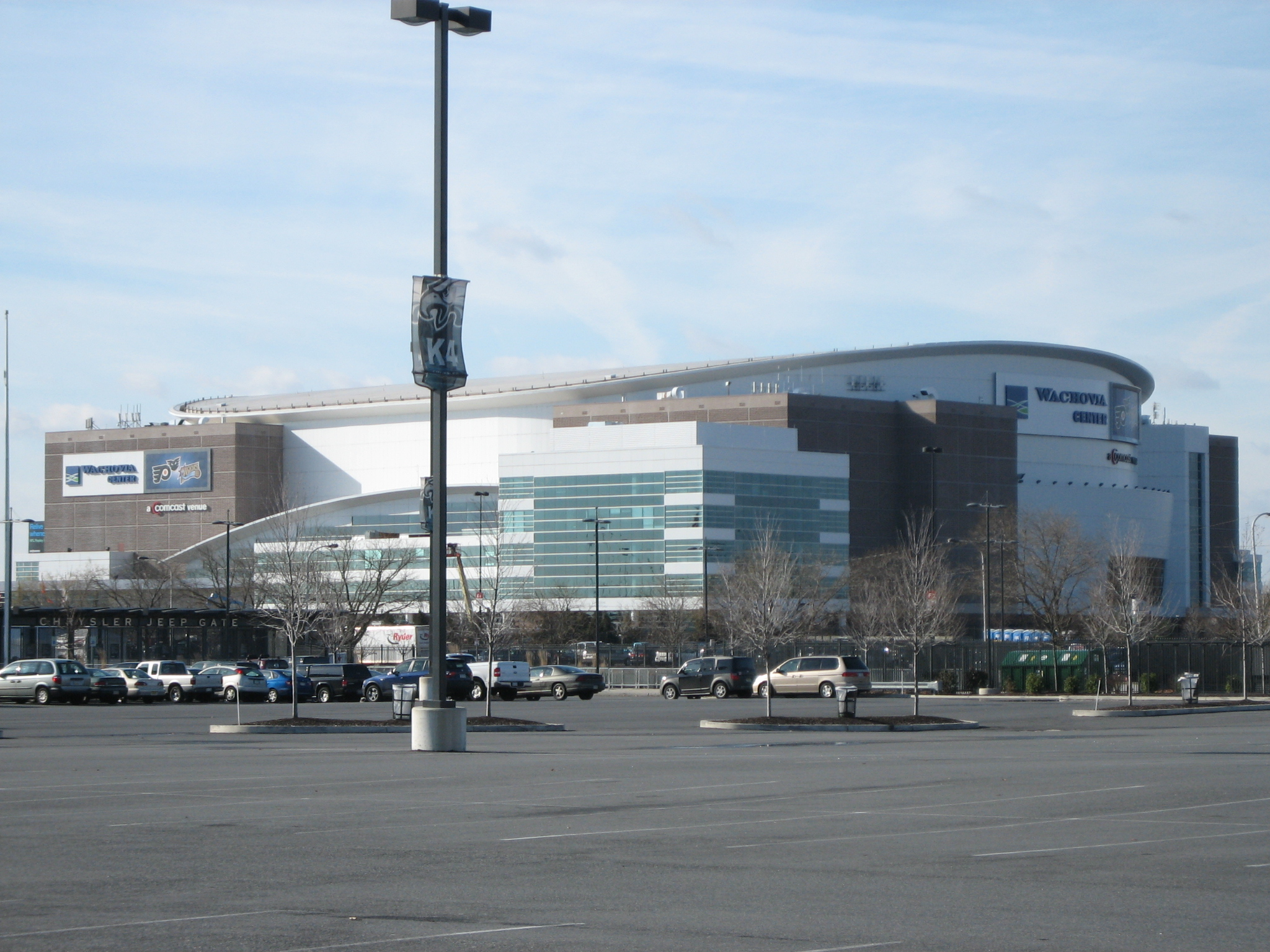
The arena, then named Wachovia Center, in December 2005

Prior to its construction, the proposed arena was tentatively called "Spectrum II". The arena was originally named for locally based CoreStates Financial Corporation, which agreed to pay $40 million over 21 years for the naming rights, with additional terms to be settled later for an additional eight-year period at the end of the contract.

The contract then went through multiple hands due to various bank mergers; first by First Union in 1998, Wachovia in 2003, and finally by Wells Fargo since July 2010. Installation of the new Wells Fargo Center branding began on July 27, 2010, with the removal of the Wachovia Center signage, followed by the installation of the new Wells Fargo Center signage. Work was completed in September 2010.

During the 2015–16 NBA season for a short time, the 76ers ceased recognizing Wells Fargo's naming rights and referred to the facility exclusively as "The Center", as the institution was not a sponsor of the team. The Wells Fargo Center logo decal which sat on the 76ers court was in the most minimal text discernible by television cameras, colored in white to blend in with the floor. (Reportedly, 76ers CEO Scott O'Neil's first idea was to color it with clear-coat paint only visible with UV blacklighting showing the logo during the opening of Sixers games when the arena lights were drawn down; however, the team, after discussion with their lawyers, elected not to do so.) With the start of the new year in January 2016 with input from Comcast Spectacor, the logo decal was enlarged and repainted in black. The 76ers then signed a non-signage sponsorship agreement with Firstrust Bank as their official banking sponsor.

On July 24, 2024, Wells Fargo announced that it would not renew its naming rights deal once it expired in August 2025. On May 6, 2025, Comcast Spectacor and Harris Blitzer Sports & Entertainment announced the arena's new name would be Xfinity Mobile Arena, and lasting through the 2030–2031 season. Xfinity Mobile is a service of Xfinity, a subsidiary of Comcast. The name change was made official on August 14, 2025.

== Facilities ==
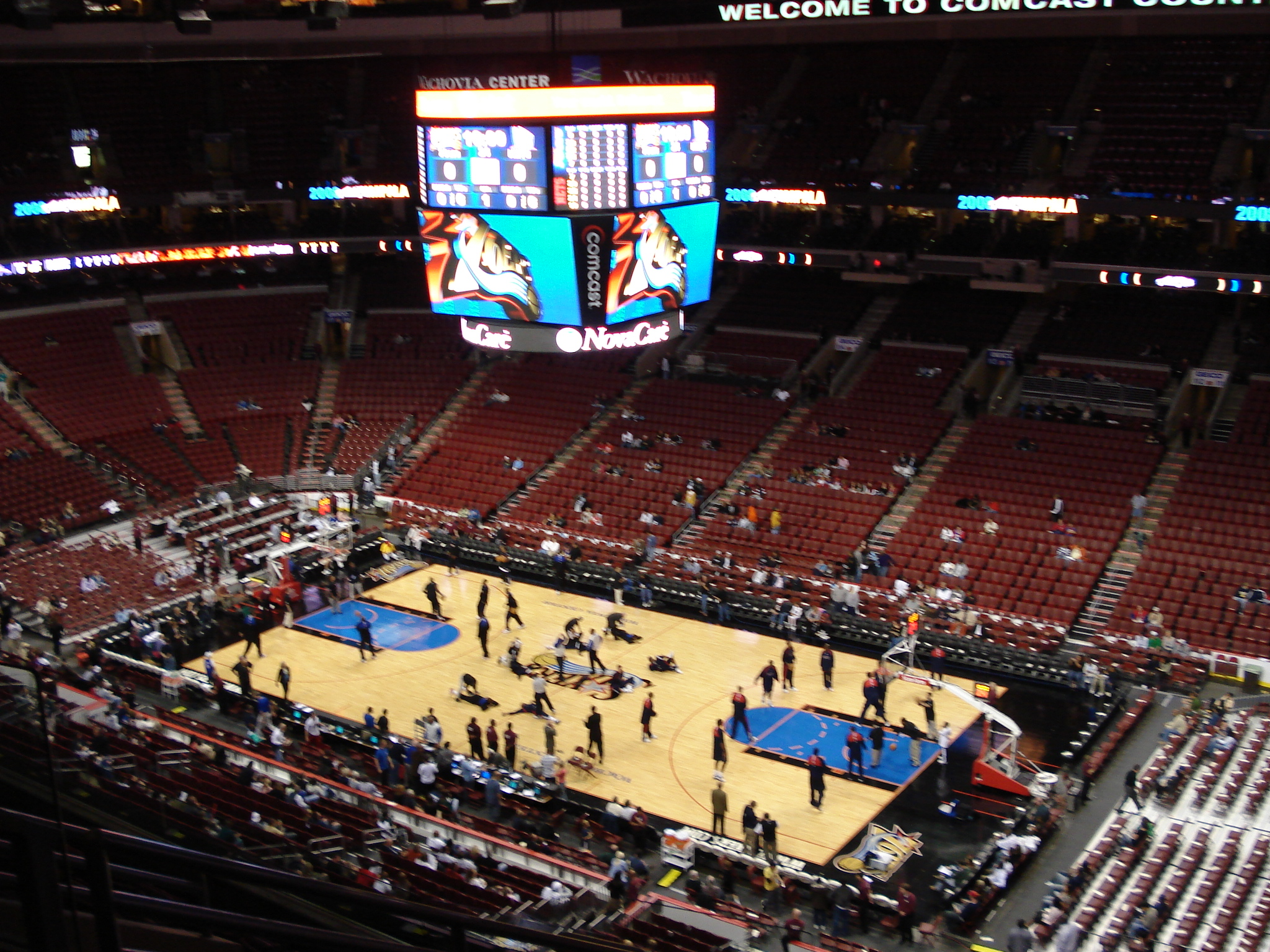
The Philadelphia 76ers warming up prior to a game vs the New Jersey Nets, now the Brooklyn Nets, on the arena's old floor design in October 2007

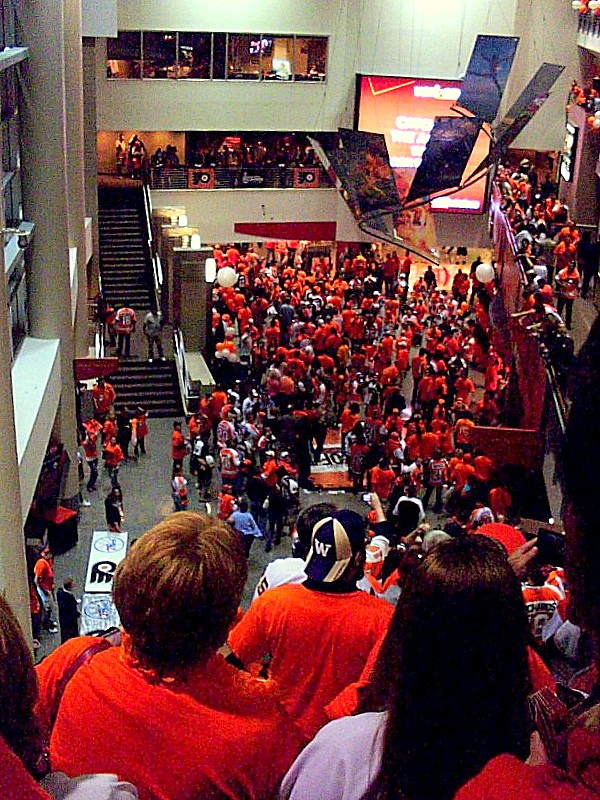
Philadelphia Flyers fans leaving the arena after a playoff game in 2010

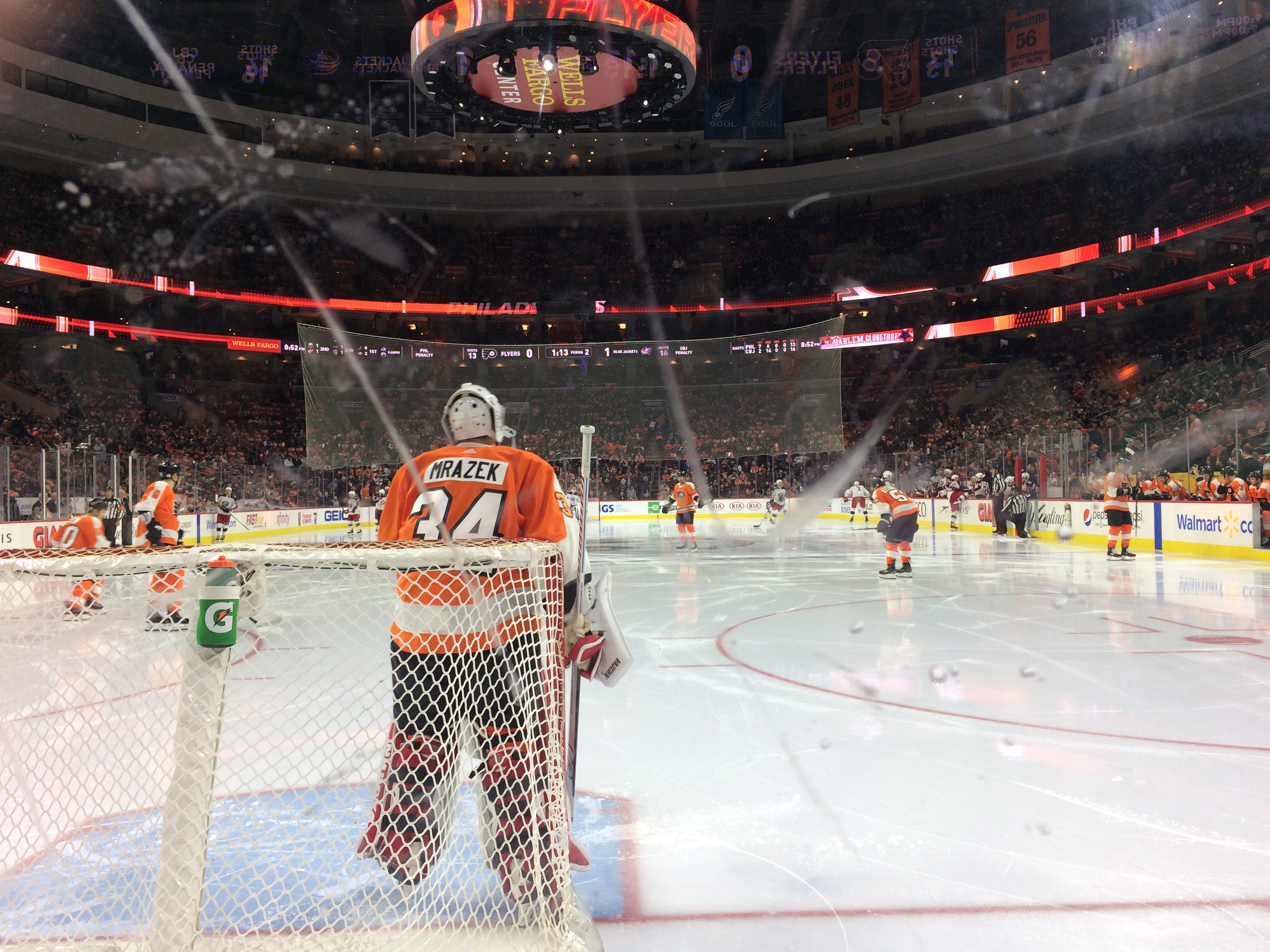
Rink-side view of the arena's hockey rink during a game between the Philadelphia Flyers and the Columbus Blue Jackets in February 2018

The arena officially seats 20,478 for NBA and NCAA basketball and 19,173 for NHL hockey and indoor NLL lacrosse. With additional standing-room admissions available in luxury and club-box suites, the total paid capacity increases. The arena has 126 luxury suites, 1,880 club-box seats, and a variety of restaurants and clubs (both public and private) available for use by patrons. In addition, the offices, studios, and production facilities of NBC Sports Philadelphia are all located in the facility.

On June 10, 2005, the arena set a record for the highest attendance for an indoor hockey game in the commonwealth of Pennsylvania (20,103) when the Philadelphia Phantoms won game four of the 2005 Calder Cup Finals over the Chicago Wolves to win the Calder Cup. The attendance record was broken on June 9, 2010, as the arena set another attendance record of 20,327 for game six of the 2010 Stanley Cup Final; the Flyers lost to the Chicago Blackhawks in overtime, which gave Chicago its first Stanley Cup since 1961. The arena also set a record for the highest attendances for a college basketball game in the commonwealth of Pennsylvania on January 29, 2017, when Villanova played and defeated Virginia before a crowd of 20,907.

On August 1, 2006, Comcast Spectacor announced it would install a new center-hung scoreboard to replace the original one made by Daktronics. The new scoreboard, manufactured by ANC Sports, is similar to other scoreboards in new NBA & NHL arenas. An additional linear LED display lining the entire arena was also installed between the suite and mezzanine levels. Other renovations for the arena's ten-year anniversary included upgrading the suites with more flat screen HDTV's, as well as changing ticket providers from Ticketmaster to New Era Tickets, which is owned by Comcast Spectacor.

The public address (PA) announcer at the arena for Flyers games is Lou Nolan, who moved with the team from the Spectrum, where he worked since 1972. Matt Cord is the PA announcer for 76ers games. Jim Bachman is the PA announcer for Villanova basketball games. Vinnie Caligiuri was the PA announcer for the Philadelphia Soul during their tenure. Kevin Casey handled PA duties for the original Philadelphia Wings, and Marc Farzetta was the PA announcer for the second iteration of the franchise.

The arena continued further renovations as part of a $265 million "Transformation 2020" initiative. It debuted a new kinetic 4K-resolution scoreboard in September 2019 also by ANC Sports, which features two main arrays of outside displays that can expand outwards to a width of 62 feet (19 m), and two 65 foot (20 m) "crown" panels that can be raised and lowered as part of sequences. The arena also unveiled a new premium area for selected ticketholders known as the "Center City Club", and—as part of a partnership with Rivers Casino Philadelphia—two sportsbook lounges open to all visitors, which will feature a bar and seating areas, televisions and odds boards, and Rivers Casino ambassadors promoting use of the casino's sports betting app.

The arena also announced the New City Terrace, a revamp of the standing room deck into a 23,000 square foot (2,100 m^{2}) "Assembly Room" (inspired by Independence Hall), with bars and eateries, fireplaces, and communal areas. The area is designed to provide a "first-class experience at an accessible price point"; the arena's cheapest tickets will feature access to the level.

== Concerts ==
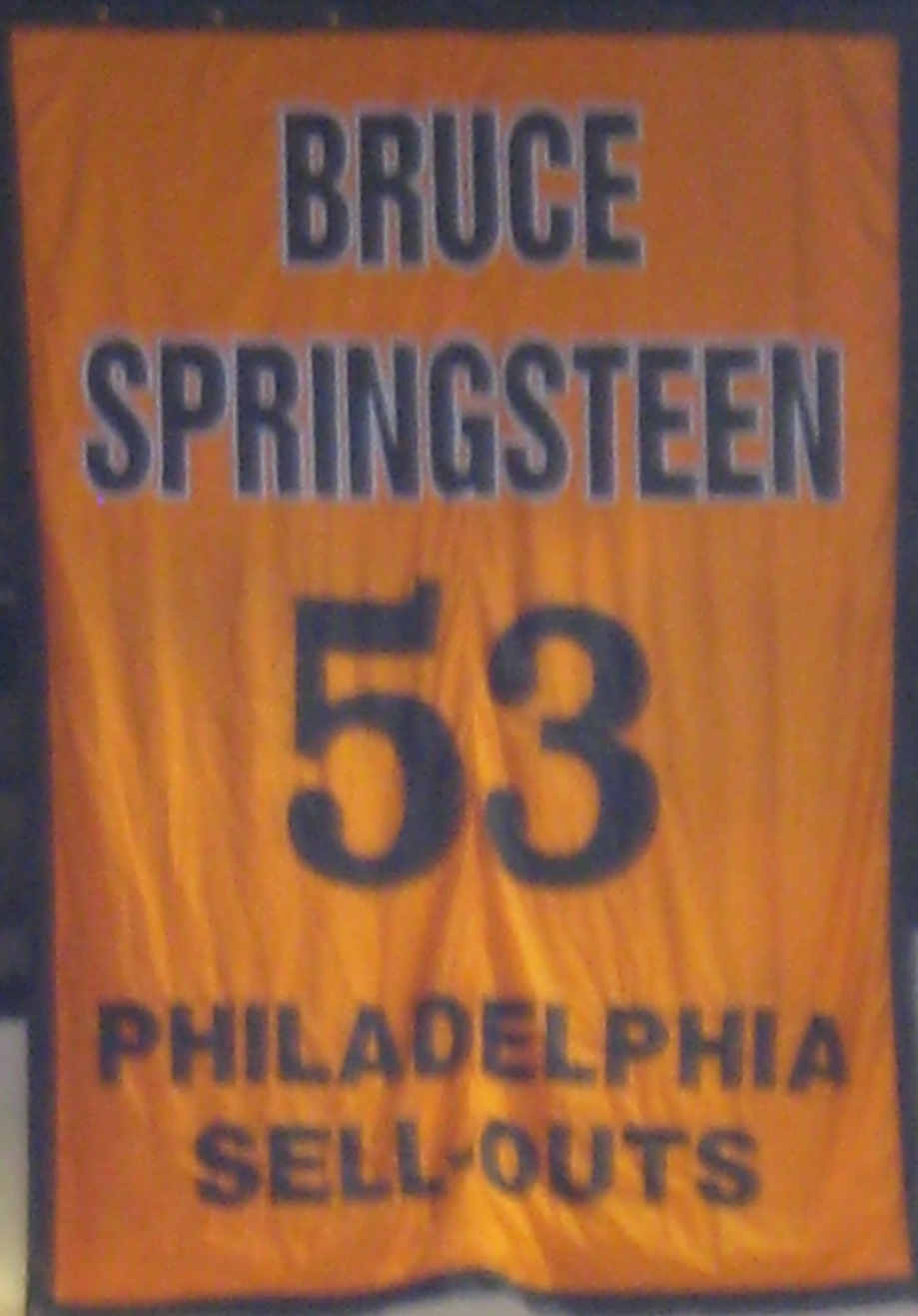
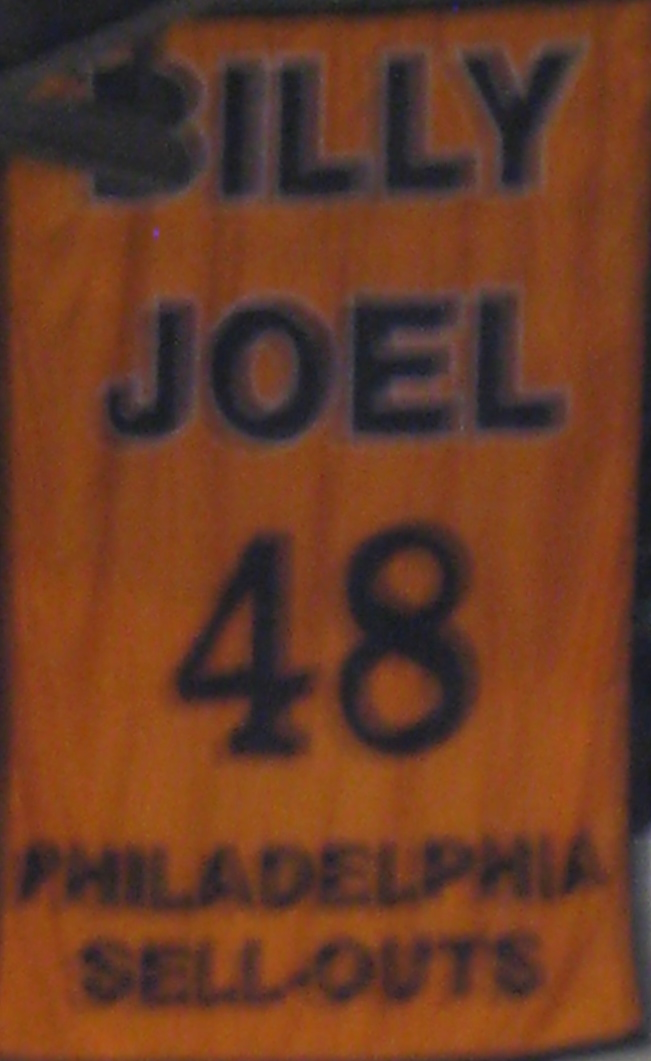
Bruce Springsteen and Billy Joel sellout banners hanging in the rafters
- On August 12, 1996, a private concert by Ray Charles was the first event at the arena, with a crowd of nearly 12,000. Each spectator was given a commemorative key acknowledging they helped "open the arena". The inaugural concert, on September 2, 1996, featured Oasis, with The Manic Street Preachers and Screaming Trees, before an estimated crowd of 12,000. The arena has since held other concerts by many famous artists.
- On December 6, 2002, hard rock band Guns N' Roses was scheduled to perform there on its Chinese Democracy Tour. The opening bands CKY and Mix Master Mike performed, but Guns N' Roses never appeared, fueling a riot in the arena and causing about $30,000 to $40,000 in damage. No reason was ever given for the non-appearance by Guns N' Roses, other than the public announcement that one of the band members was ill.
- In 2006, Billy Joel set a record when he sold-out his 18th concert at the arena.
- In 2016, American rock band Pearl Jam played two shows, during which they were awarded a banner for ten sell out shows. This then prompted the band on the second night to play their debut album Ten from start to finish.

In addition, hanging from the rafters of the arena are three banners in the orange and black colors of the Flyers honoring Pearl Jam's 10, Billy Joel's 48, and Bruce Springsteen's 56 Philadelphia sellouts, respectively.

== Tenants ==
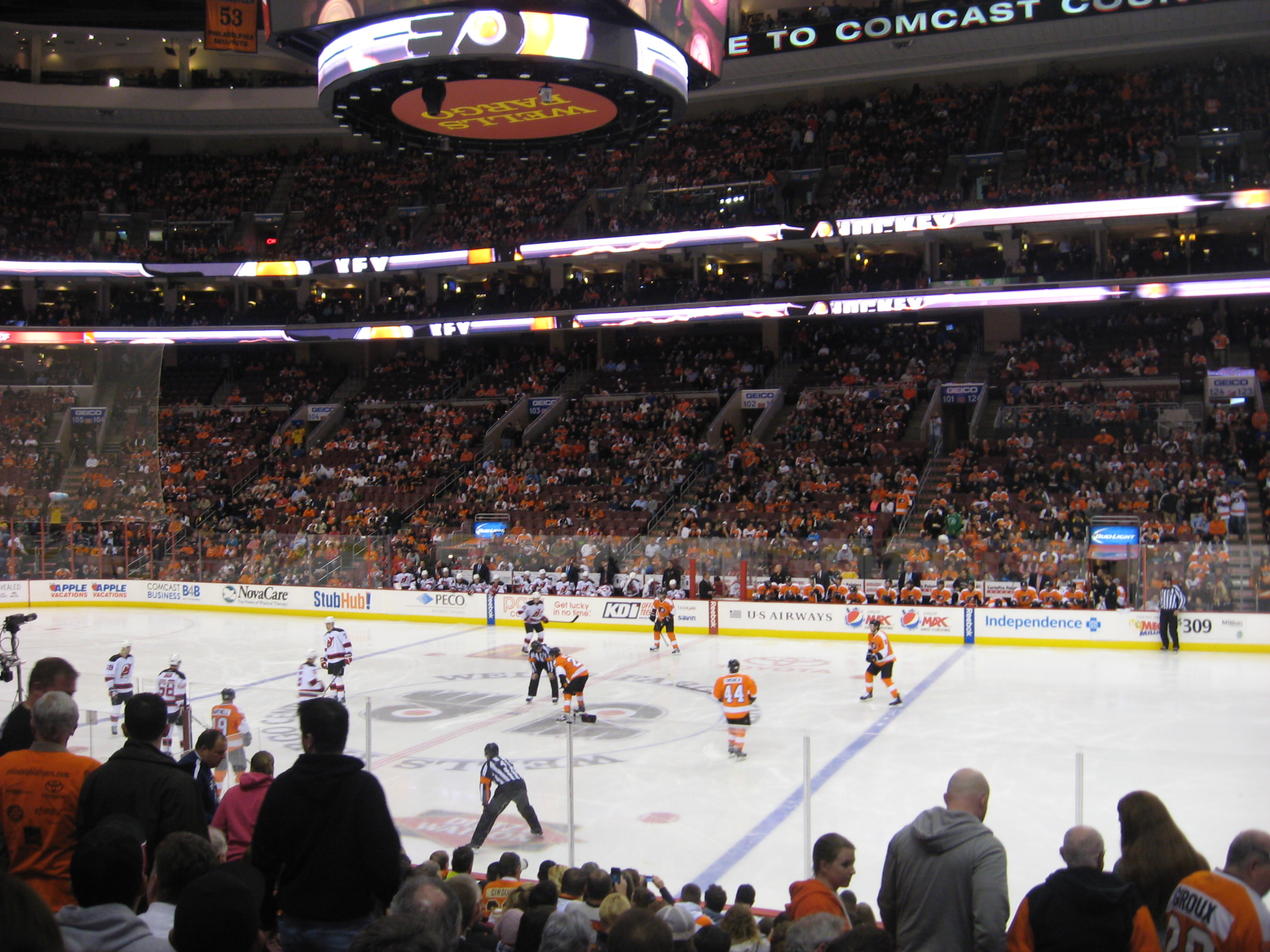
The Flyers playing the New Jersey Devils at the arena in March 2014

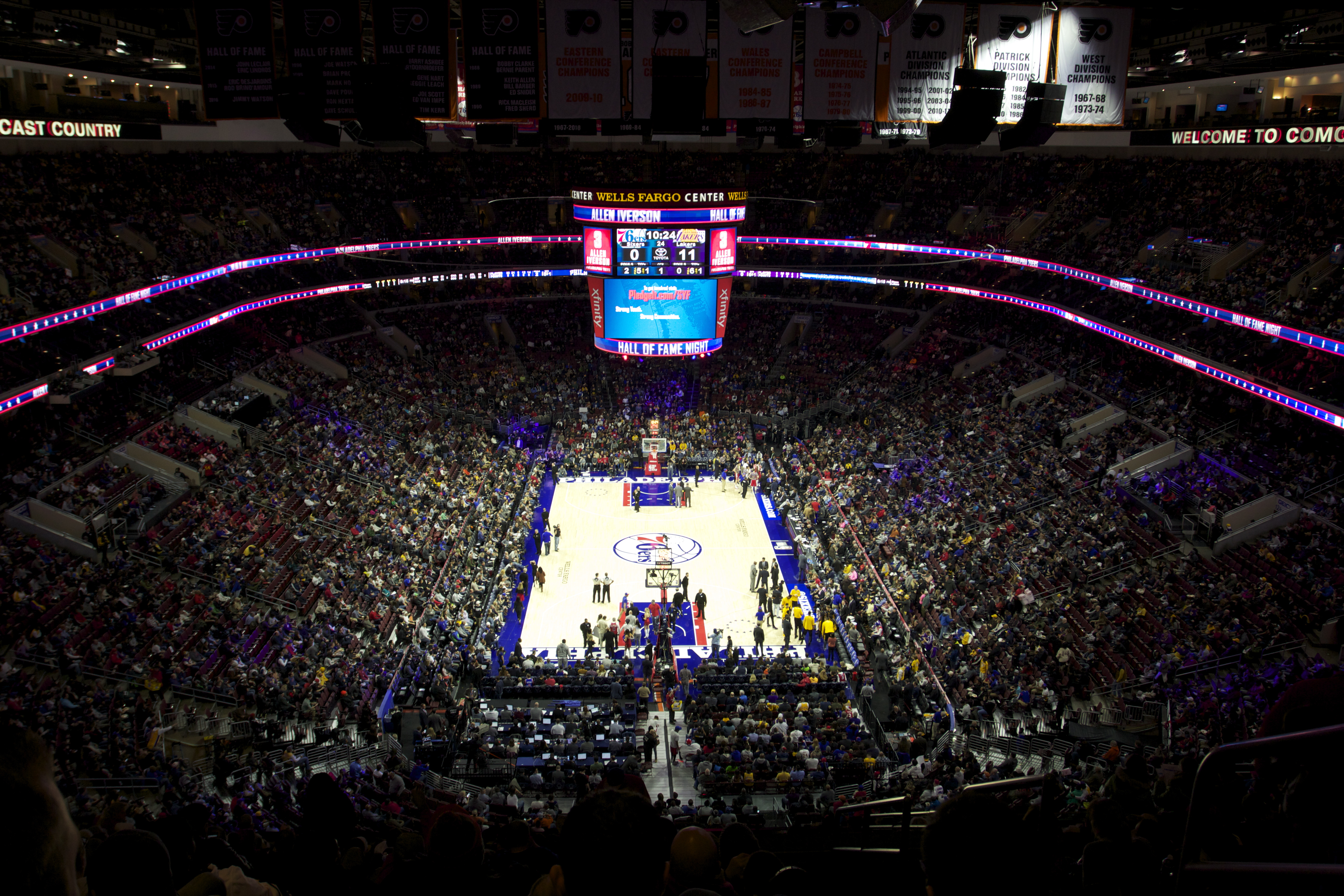
The 76ers playing the Los Angeles Lakers at the arena in December 2016

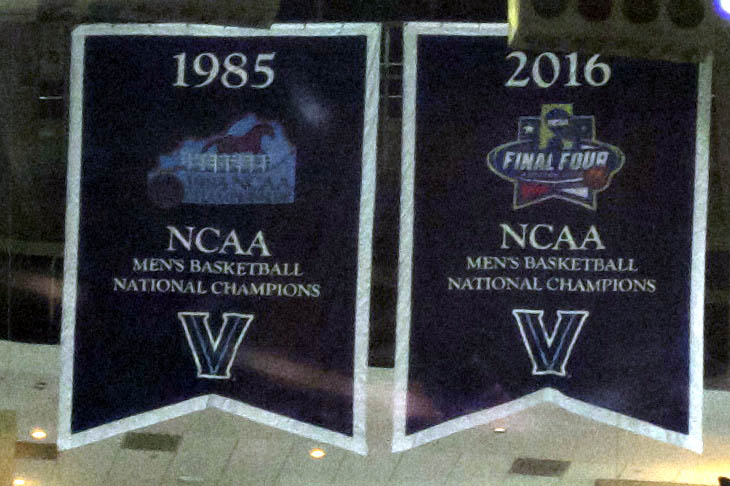
Villanova Wildcats' 1985 and 2016 NCAA national championship banners on display in the arena rafters; the Wildcats play select home games at the arena.

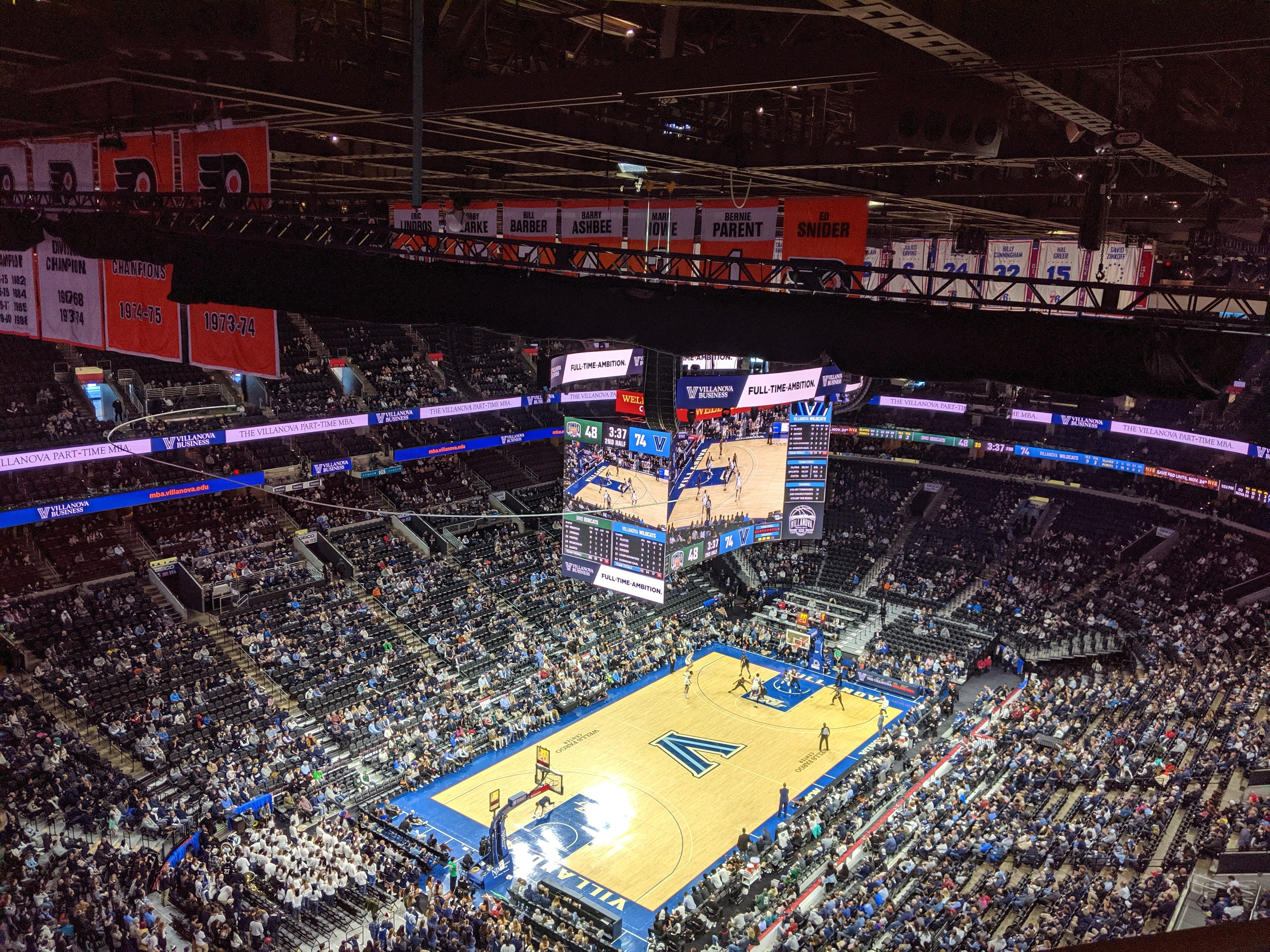
The Villanova Wildcats playing the Ohio Bobcats at the arena in November 2019

=== Full time ===
- Philadelphia Flyers of the National Hockey League
- Philadelphia 76ers of the National Basketball Association

=== Part time ===
- Villanova Wildcats men's basketball of the NCAA's Big East Conference; high-attendance home games for which the on-campus arena, Finneran Pavilion, is inadequate to accommodate are played at the arena. The men's team played the majority of its home games of the 2017–18 season here while Finneran Pavilion underwent renovations.

=== Recurring events ===
- Big 5 Classic; The men's iteration of the tournament featuring the six members of the Philadelphia Big 5 is held annually at the arena on the first Saturday of December.

=== Former full time ===
- Philadelphia Soul of the Arena Football League
- Philadelphia Wings (both iterations) of the National Lacrosse League

=== Former part time ===
- Philadelphia Phantoms of the American Hockey League (AHL); the Flyers' AHL development club played some regular season and Calder Cup playoff games at the arena each season between 1996 and 2009 when the Spectrum was unavailable because of other events.

=== Capacity ===
Basketball
Years	Capacity
1996–2006	20,338
2006–2010	20,318
2010–2015	20,328
2015–present	20,478

Hockey/Lacrosse
Years	Capacity
1996–1997	19,463
1997–1998	19,511
1998–2003	19,519
2003–2008	19,523
2008–2014	19,537
2014–2015	19,541
2015–2016	19,543
2016–2018	19,605
2018–2022	19,306
2022–present	19,173

== Notable events ==
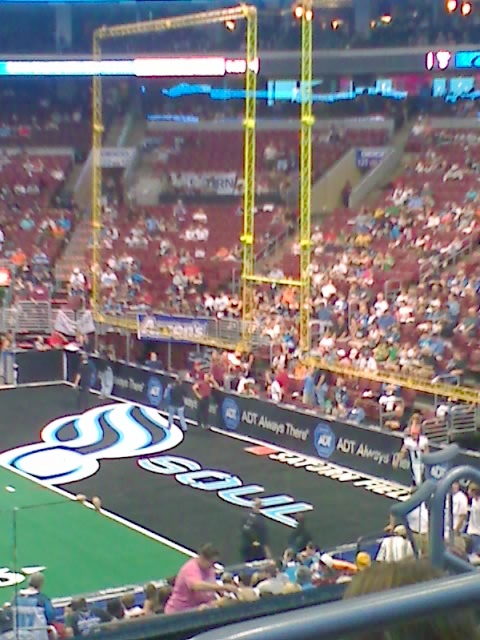
The arena, then named Wachovia Center, during a Philadelphia Soul game in July 2008

=== National political conventions ===
- 2000 Republican National Convention
- 2016 Democratic National Convention

=== Sports ===
- 1996 World Cup of Hockey (three games)
- WWF In Your House: Mind Games, 1996
- 1997 Stanley Cup Final
- 1998 United States Figure Skating Championships
- 1998 NLL Championship
- 1999 AHL All-Star Classic
- WrestleMania XV, 1999
- 2000 NCAA Women's Basketball Final Four
- WWF Unforgiven, 2000
- 2001 NCAA men's basketball tournament East Regional
- 2001 NBA Finals
  - The Los Angeles Lakers won the NBA Championship at the arena, winning game five and the series, 4–1.
- X Games VII, 2001
- 2002 NBA All-Star Game
- X Games VIII, 2002
- WWE Royal Rumble, 2004
- 2005 AHL Calder Cup Finals
  - The Philadelphia Phantoms won the Calder Cup at the arena, defeating the Chicago Wolves in game four and winning the series, 4–0.
- 2006 NCAA Division I men's basketball tournament, 1st & 2nd rounds
- WWE Survivor Series, 2006
- U.S. Olympic Team Trials – Gymnastics, 2008
- 2009 NCAA Division I men's basketball tournament, 1st & 2nd rounds
- WWE Night of Champions, 2009
- UFC 101: Declaration, 2009
- 2010 Stanley Cup Final
  - The Chicago Blackhawks won the Stanley Cup at the arena, winning game six and the series, 4–2.
- NCAA Men's Wrestling Championship, 2011
- UFC 133: Evans vs. Ortiz 2, 2011
- 2013 NCAA Division I men's basketball tournament, 2nd & 3rd rounds
- WWE Money in the Bank, 2013
- NCAA Men's Ice Hockey Championship, 2014
- 2014 NHL entry draft
- WWE Royal Rumble, 2015
- 2016 NCAA Division I men's basketball tournament East Regional
- 2016 Kellogg's Tour of Gymnastics Champions
- WWE Battleground, 2017
- ArenaBowl XXX, 2017
- WWE NXT TakeOver: Philadelphia, 2018, WWE Royal Rumble 2018, WWE Raw, January 29, 2018, WWE SmackDown, January 30, 2018 as part of the Royal Rumble weekend
- UFC on ESPN: Barboza vs. Gaethje, 2019
- WWE Extreme Rules, 2019
  - The event featured The Undertaker's final match in front of a live audience in the United States before his retirement in 2020.
- WWE Elimination Chamber, 2020
- 2022 NCAA Division I men's basketball tournament East Regional
- WWE Extreme Rules, 2022
- WWE Raw is XXX, January 23, 2023
- SmackDown and 2024 WWE Hall Of Fame on April 5, NXT Stand & Deliver on April 6, and Raw April 8, 2024, as part of WrestleMania XL weekend.
- Unrivaled, January 30, 2026, set a record for the highest attendance of any professional women's basketball regular-season game, with a total attendance of 21,490.
- UFC 330: Makhachev vs. Machado Garry, 2026
- PWHL Takeover Tour, February 13, 2027 game between Vancouver Goldeneyes and San Jose Sea Lions and April 10, 2027 game between New York Sirens and Toronto Sceptres.

=== Esports ===
- Overwatch League Grand Finals, 2019

=== Television ===
- Buletin Utama from Philadelphia, 2004
- Wheel of Fortune from Philadelphia, 2004
- Wheel of Fortune Family Week, 2004
- Wheel of Fortune Teen Best Friends Week, 2005 with another $100,000 winner
- American Idol auditions, 2007
- It’s Always Sunny in Philadelphia, 2010 (S6 E4) Mac wins a radio contest to shoot a puck from the middle of the ice.
- Impractical Jokers, 2016 (S5 E16) Joe's punishment during a Philadelphia Soul Arena Football League game.

=== Others ===
- Harvest Crusades, 2013
- Declare the Good News special convention of Jehovah's Witnesses, 4000 delegates from 21 different Nations, 2024
- Adirei Hatorah, 2022–2025

== Controversy ==
In October 2019, center staff removed fans shouting "Free Hong Kong" at a pre-season basketball game between the Philadelphia 76ers and Guangzhou Loong Lions.

== See also ==
- List of indoor arenas in the United States
- List of NCAA Division I basketball arenas
- List of basketball arenas

== Notes ==
Events and tenants
Preceded by Spectrum	Home of the Philadelphia Flyers; 1996 – present	Succeeded by current
Preceded by Spectrum	Home of the Philadelphia 76ers 1996 – present	Succeeded by current
Preceded by FleetCenter	Host of WrestleMania; 1999	Succeeded by Arrowhead Pond
Preceded by MCI Center	Host of the NBA All-Star Game; 2002	Succeeded by Philips Arena
Preceded by FleetCenter	Host of the Royal Rumble; 2004	Succeeded by Save Mart Center
Preceded by Consol Energy Center; Pittsburgh, Pennsylvania	Host of the men's Frozen Four; 2014	Succeeded by TD Garden; Boston, Massachusetts
