= Monsey =

Monsey may refer to:

- Monsey, New York, a hamlet in Rockland County, New York, United States
- Monsey, Benin, a town and arrondissement in Alibori Department, Benin
- Messenger Monsey (1694–1788), English physician and humourist
