= ANC Sports =

ANC Sports Enterprises, LLC
- Type: Private
- Industry: Audio and visual integration, sports marketing, graphic design
- Founded: 1997; 29 years ago, in Purchase, New York
- Headquarters: Purchase, New York, United States
- Key people: Jerry Cifarelli, Jr., CEO
- Products: LED displays, display marquees, sports scoreboards, marketing, signage control software

ANC is a sports multimedia and technology integration company based in Purchase, New York. ANC provides technology, design, installation, and advertising for sports, entertainment, retail, and transportation facilities.

Founded in 1997 by Jerry Cifarelli Sr., in 2023, C10 Media and Cifarelli Sr. purchased the company back from Learfield, with Jerry Cifarelli Jr. becoming ANC CEO.

== History ==
=== Formation ===
ANC was founded in 1997 by Jerry Cifarelli Sr. and Alan N. Cohen, former co-owner of the Boston Celtics. ANC acquired North American rights to Space & Time rotational signage technology in 1997, and also that year, agreed with the WNBA to provide each team with all of its rotational signage. In 1998, the company was offering courtside and back-lit fascia rotational signages. ANC formed a technology division, ANC Technologies, in 1999. ANC Technologies developed FasciaSOFT, an operating engine for LED systems, permitting the company to debut the first 360° LED fascia signage in the National Hockey League. In 1999, ANC formed ANC Marketing to consult and assist clients on marketing strategies.

=== Growth ===
From 2002 to 2006, ANC was selected to provide ongoing operational services for digital fascia and scoreboard signage at venues such as Cleveland's Quicken Loans Arena, Minnesota's Target Center, Philadelphia's Wells Fargo Center and Toronto's Air Canada Centre.

During the same period, ANC debuted VisionSOFT, an LED operating software and the first 3D interface capable of controlling multiple displays through one console and distributing uncompressed video to its displays, eliminating distortion. The VisionSOFT application also operates DLP Digital Court side press tables, which, during the 2005–06 season, became the first court side digital signage to be approved for an NBA event. A few months after introducing digital press tables, ANC expanded ANC Marketing into a national advertising sales division. ANC Sports then debuted new LED and DLP II Court side Signage Systems in the NBA and NCAA. After introducing digital court side press tables, ANC formed a manufacturing relationship with Mitsubishi Electric. Since then, ANC has completed large LED signage projects such as the Washington Nationals' new ballpark, Washington D.C.'s Verizon Center and Portland's Rose Garden.

VisionSOFT operated the LED display system at Pittsburgh's Consol Energy Center in 2010. ANC renovated Fenway Park with a high-definition video display system in 2011, and that year also contributed LED signage around the perimeter of a tennis court for the first time during a professional event in the United States. Also in 2011, it provided digital signage for the Dodge National Circuit Finals Rodeo in Oklahoma. ANC collaborated with The Caesars Tribute to the Golden Age of Ice Skating held in Atlantic City in 2010.

=== Ownership changes ===
Learfield bought ANC in 2015. On December 31, 2021, Jerry Cifarelli Senior retired from ANC after working with the company for 25 years. In 2023, C10 Media and Cifarelli Sr. purchased the company back from Learfield, with Jerry Cifarelli Jr. becoming ANC CEO. ANC's recent projects include the Los Angeles Dodgers, the Cleveland Cavaliers, Moynihan Train Hall, and Westfield World Trade Center.

== Products ==
Its product and service offering includes Light-Emitting Diode ("LED"), rotational, and fixed visual displays; digital media software and control systems; signage operation and maintenance; advertising marketing consultation; graphic design; and printing production.
