= 1980 Major League Baseball All-Star Game =

1980 American baseball competition

	1	2	3	4	5	6	7	8	9	R	H	E
American League	0	0	0	0	2	0	0	0	0	2	7	2
National League	0	0	0	0	1	2	1	0	X	4	7	0
- Date: July 8, 1980
- Venue: Dodger Stadium
- City: Los Angeles, California
- Managers: Earl Weaver (BAL); Chuck Tanner (PIT)
- MVP: Ken Griffey (CIN)
- Attendance: 56,088
- Television: ABC
- TV announcers: Keith Jackson, Al Michaels, Howard Cosell and Don Drysdale
- Radio: CBS
- Radio announcers: Vin Scully and Brent Musburger

The 1980 Major League Baseball All-Star Game was the 51st midseason exhibition between the all-stars of the American League (AL) and the National League (NL), the two leagues comprising Major League Baseball. The game was played on July 8, 1980, at Dodger Stadium in Los Angeles, California, home of the Los Angeles Dodgers of the National League. The game resulted in a 4–2 victory for the NL.

While this would mark the second time that the Dodgers had hosted the All-Star Game in Los Angeles, it was the first time that the game was being held at Dodger Stadium. Their first time as host in 1959 saw the game played at Los Angeles Memorial Coliseum; the Dodgers' Los Angeles home field until the construction of Dodger Stadium.

This All-Star Game would be known for some exemplary pitching performances, most notably AL starter Steve Stone's (three perfect innings, three strikeouts). Jerry Reuss struck out the side for the NL in the sixth, as well.

It would also be one of the final games for NL starter J. R. Richard. Richard was diagnosed with a career-ending stroke weeks later.

The pregame ceremonies of the All-Star Game featured Disney characters. Later, Edwards Air Force Base of Rosamond, California, provided both the colors presentation and, after the Los Angeles All-City Band performed the Canadian and U.S. National Anthems, the flyover ceremonies. This All-Star Game marked the first nationally televised US performance of O Canada after it had officially been designated the Canadian National Anthem seven days earlier on July 1, 1980. It also marked the debut of the modern-day large-scale video screen, with the first such video scoreboard, Diamond Vision by Mitsubishi Electric, being introduced at this game.

== Game summary ==
The AL and NL were locked in a scoreless duel for four innings, including Stone's performance mentioned above. Fred Lynn would break the deadlock in the top of the fifth with a two-run homer off Bob Welch.

The National League came back with a single run in their half of the fifth when Ken Griffey homered off Tommy John. The NL took the lead in the bottom of the sixth when George Hendrick singled home Ray Knight and Phil Garner scored on a Willie Randolph error.

The NL's final run scored in the seventh when Dave Concepcion reached on a fielder's choice, went to second on a wild-pitch by Dave Stieb, then to third on a passed ball by Darrell Porter, and came home on another Stieb wild pitch.

== Rosters ==
Players in italics have since been inducted into the National Baseball Hall of Fame.

=== American League ===
Elected Starters
Position	Player	Team	All-Star Games
C	Carlton Fisk	Red Sox	7
1B	Rod Carew	Angels	14
2B	Paul Molitor	Brewers	1
3B	George Brett	Royals	5
SS	Bucky Dent	Yankees	2
OF	Reggie Jackson	Yankees	10
OF	Fred Lynn	Red Sox	6
OF	Jim Rice	Red Sox	4

Pitchers
Position	Player	Team	All-Star Games
SP	Steve Stone	Orioles	1
P	Tom Burgmeier	Red Sox	1
P	Ed Farmer	White Sox	1
P	Rich Gossage	Yankees	5
P	Larry Gura	Royals	1
P	Rick Honeycutt	Mariners	1
P	Tommy John	Yankees	4
P	Dave Stieb	Blue Jays	1

Reserves
Position	Player	Team	All-Star Games
C	Lance Parrish	Tigers	1
C	Darrell Porter	Royals	4
1B	Cecil Cooper	Brewers	2
2B	Bobby Grich	Angels	5
2B	Willie Randolph	Yankees	3
3B	Buddy Bell	Rangers	2
3B	Graig Nettles	Yankees	5
SS	Alan Trammell	Tigers	1
SS	Robin Yount	Brewers	1
OF	Al Bumbry	Orioles	1
OF	Rickey Henderson	Athletics	1
OF	Ken Landreaux	Twins	1
OF	Al Oliver	Rangers	4
OF	Jorge Orta	Indians	2
OF	Ben Oglivie	Brewers	1

=== National League ===
Elected Starters
Position	Player	Team	All-Star Games
C	Johnny Bench	Reds	13
1B	Steve Garvey	Dodgers	7
2B	Davey Lopes	Dodgers	3
3B	Mike Schmidt	Phillies	5
SS	Bill Russell	Dodgers	3
OF	Dave Kingman	Cubs	3
OF	Dave Parker	Pirates	3
OF	Reggie Smith	Dodgers	7

Pitchers
Position	Player	Team	All-Star Games
SP	J. R. Richard	Astros	1
P	Jim Bibby	Pirates	1
P	Vida Blue	Giants	4
P	Steve Carlton	Phillies	8
P	Jerry Reuss	Dodgers	2
P	Bruce Sutter	Cubs	4
P	Kent Tekulve	Pirates	1
P	Bob Welch	Dodgers	1
P	Ed Whitson	Giants	1

Reserves
Position	Player	Team	All-Star Games
C	Gary Carter	Expos	3
C	John Stearns	Mets	3
1B	Keith Hernandez	Cardinals	2
1B	Pete Rose	Phillies	14
2B	Phil Garner	Pirates	2
3B	Ray Knight	Reds	1
3B	Ken Reitz	Cardinals	1
SS	Dave Concepción	Reds	7
OF	José Cruz	Astros	1
OF	Ken Griffey	Reds	3
OF	George Hendrick	Cardinals	3
OF	Dale Murphy	Braves	1
OF	Dave Winfield	Padres	4

== Game ==
=== Umpires ===
Position	Umpire
Home Plate	John Kibler (NL)
First Base	Larry Barnett (AL)
Second Base	Nick Colosi (NL)
Third Base	Jim McKean (AL)
Left Field	Jerry Dale (NL)
Right Field	Rich Garcia (AL)

=== Starting lineups ===
American League				National League			
Order	Player	Team	Position	Order	Player	Team	Position
1	Willie Randolph	Yankees	2B	1	Davey Lopes	Dodgers	2B
2	Rod Carew	Angels	1B	2	Reggie Smith	Dodgers	CF
3	Fred Lynn	Red Sox	CF	3	Dave Parker	Pirates	RF
4	Reggie Jackson	Yankees	RF	4	Steve Garvey	Dodgers	1B
5	Ben Oglivie	Brewers	LF	5	Johnny Bench	Reds	C
6	Carlton Fisk	Red Sox	C	6	Dave Kingman	Cubs	LF
7	Graig Nettles	Yankees	3B	7	Ken Reitz	Cardinals	3B
8	Bucky Dent	Yankees	SS	8	Bill Russell	Dodgers	SS
9	Steve Stone	Orioles	P	9	J. R. Richard	Astros	P

=== Game summary ===
Tuesday, July 8, 1980 5:35 pm (PT) at Dodger Stadium in Los Angeles, California
Team	1	2	3	4	5	6	7	8	9	R	H	E
American League	0	0	0	0	2	0	0	0	0	2	7	2
National League	0	0	0	0	1	2	1	0	X	4	7	0
WP: Jerry Reuss (1-0) LP: Tommy John (0-1) Sv: Bruce Sutter (1); Home runs: AL: Fred Lynn (1); NL: Ken Griffey (1)
