= Diamond Vision =

Large-scale video walls

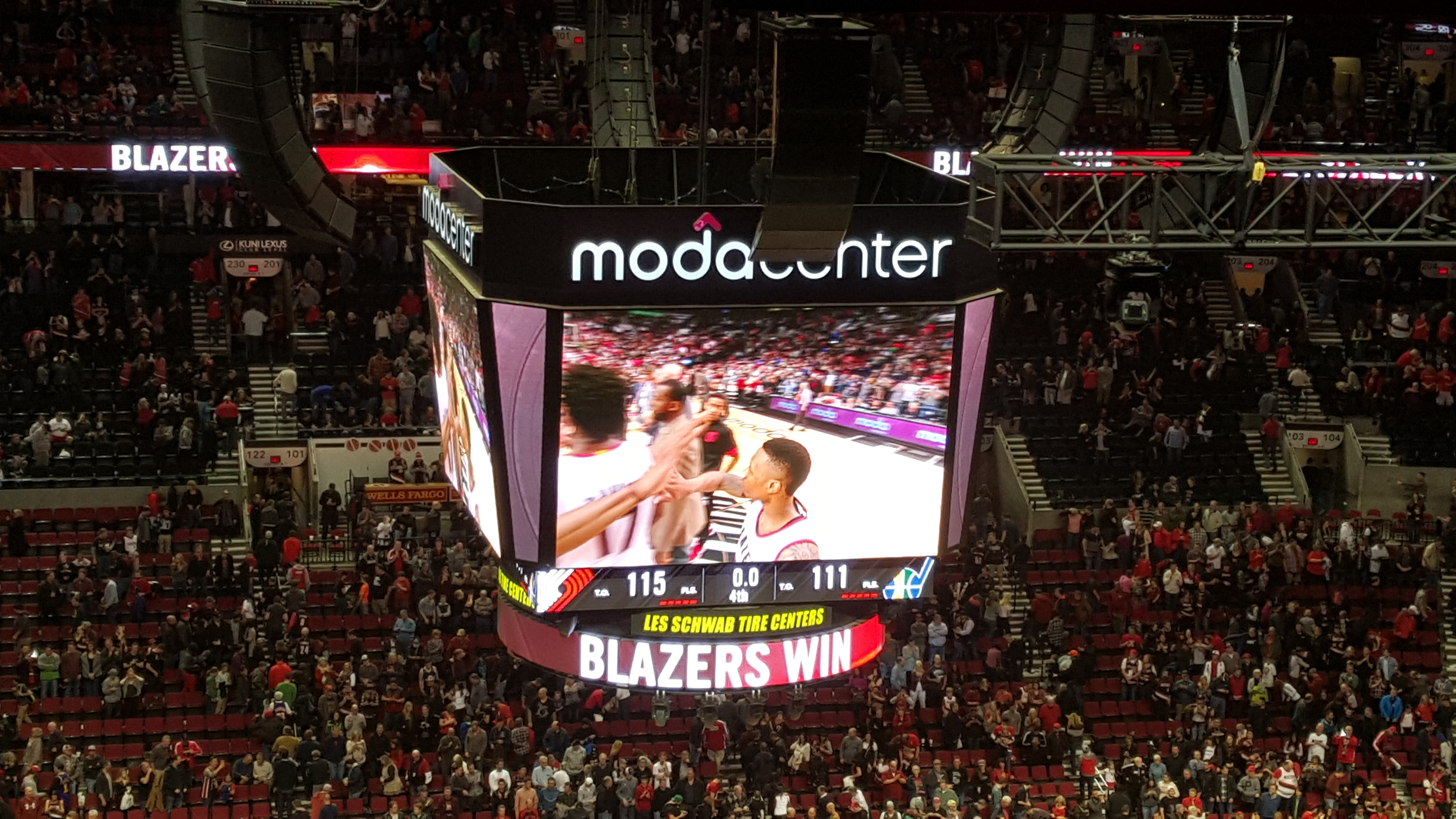
Diamond Vision scoreboard

Diamond Vision (known as Aurora Vision in Japan) displays are large-scale video walls for indoor and outdoor sports venues and commercial applications, produced by the Mitsubishi Electric Corporation. Diamond Vision Systems is a division of Mitsubishi Electric Power Products, Inc. and is headquartered in Warrendale, Pennsylvania, where certain products are designed and assembled for the North American market.

Diamond Vision video screens incorporate technologies developed by Mitsubishi Electric. For wide viewing angles, Diamond Vision screens utilize chip-type LEDs. Mitsubishi Electric also uses patented processing technology in Diamond Vision boards for imagery and color reproduction. Early Diamond Vision displays used Cathode-ray tube technology, similarly to Jumbotrons.

Diamond Vision's awards include an Emmy Award and the Best in Sports Technology award from the Sports Business Journal–Sports Business Daily. In addition, Diamond Vision installations have been recognized five times by Guinness World Records.

Diamond Vision Systems is the Official Large Outdoor Video Display Provider of the PGA Tour. An early installation was at the European F1 Grand Prix at Brands Hatch, UK, in 1983.

== Historical milestones ==
Mitsubishi Electric began manufacturing and installing large-scale video screens in 1980, with the introduction of the first Diamond Vision board at Dodger Stadium in Los Angeles for the 1980 Major League Baseball All-Star Game. This technology consisted of individual flood beam cathode-ray tubes, one for each sub-pixel, eventually replaced by LED technology.

Diamond Vision installed 3 screens at the JFK Stadium in Philadelphia, and two in Wembley Stadium during Live Aid. They would be used to show the live feed from Philadelphia to Wembley and Wembley to Philadelphia.

In 2004, Diamond Vision Systems installed North America’s largest indoor high-definition (HD) screen, measuring 34 by 110 feet (10 m × 34 m), at the Colosseum at Caesars Palace in Las Vegas, Nevada. The following year, the Diamond Vision LED display at Turner Field (now Center Parc Stadium) in Atlanta was recognized by Guinness World Records as the world’s largest high-definition television screen.

Diamond Vision was recognized by Guinness World Records in 2009, when two video boards measuring 72 by 160 feet (22 m × 49 m) at Cowboys Stadium (now AT&T Stadium) in Arlington, Texas were named the world’s largest 1080p high-definition video displays.

In 2012, Diamond Vision Systems won an Emmy Award in the Pioneering Development of Large-Venue, Large-Screen Direct View Color Video Displays category.

A Diamond Vision 25,610 square feet (2,379 m^{2}) high-resolution video display with a pixel density of 2,368 x 10,048 was installed in Times Square in 2014.

In 2016, Diamond Vision HD screens replaced the main center video board and the auxiliary boards in right and left field at U.S. Cellular Field (now Rate Field).
