= Video wall =

Technique used for creating large video displays, without a video projector

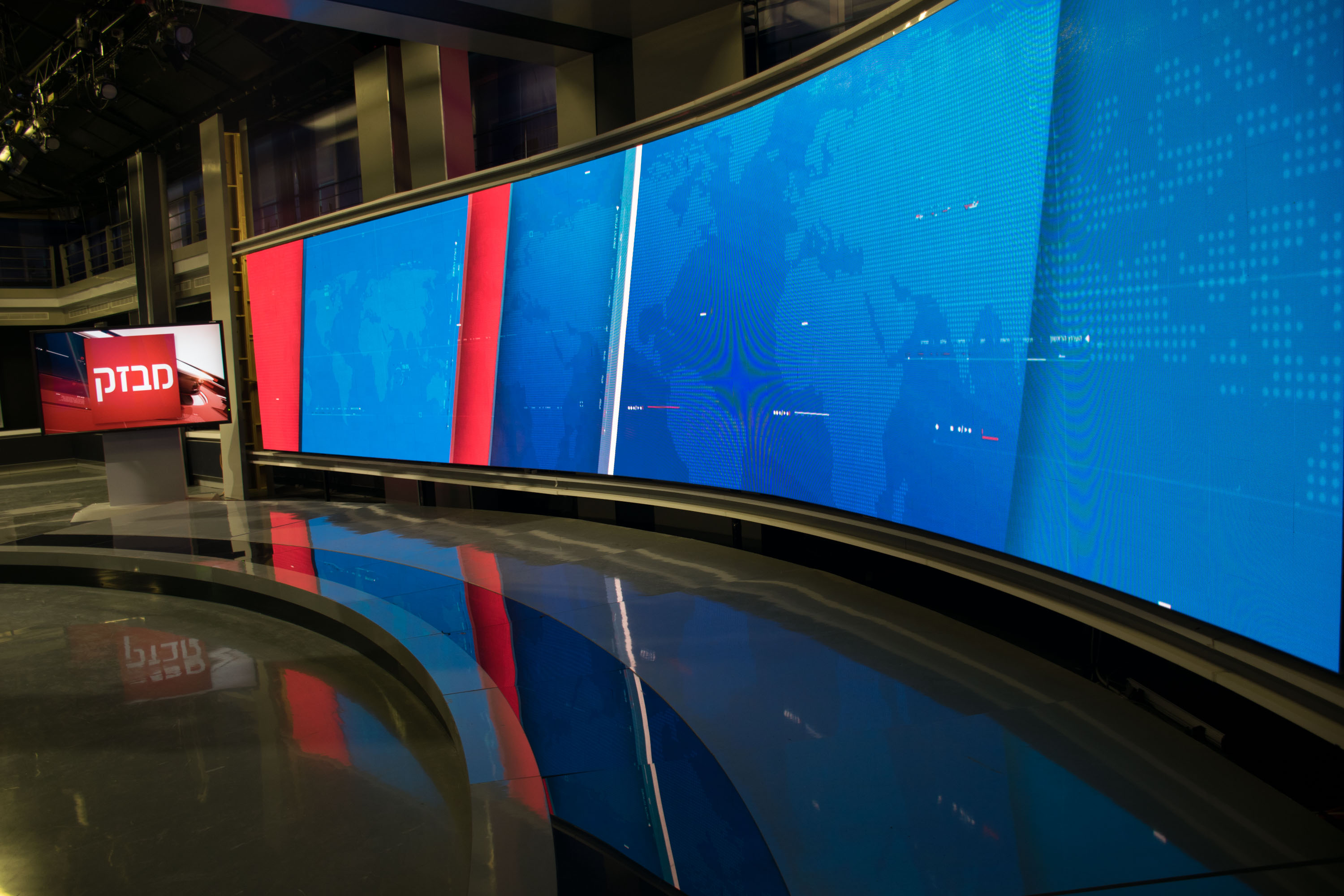
A video wall in television studio

A video wall, television wall or TV wall is a special multi-monitor setup that consists of multiple computer monitors, video projectors, or television sets tiled together contiguously or overlapped in order to form one large screen. Typical display technologies include LCD panels, Direct View LED arrays, blended projection screens, Laser Phosphor Displays, and rear projection cubes. Jumbotron technology was also previously used. Diamond Vision was historically similar to Jumbotron in that they both used cathode-ray tube (CRT) technology, but with slight differences between the two. Early Diamond vision displays used separate flood gun CRTs, one per subpixel. Later Diamond vision displays and all Jumbotrons used field-replaceable modules containing several flood gun CRTs each, one per subpixel, that had common connections shared across all CRTs in a module; the module was connected through a single weather-sealed connector. Eventually these cathode-ray tube-based technologies were replaced by LED arrays.

Screens specifically designed for use in video walls usually have narrow bezels in order to minimize the gap between active display areas, and are built with long-term serviceability in mind. Such screens often contain the hardware necessary to stack similar screens together, along with connections to daisy chain power, video, and command signals between screens. A command signal may, for example, power all screens in the video wall on or off, or calibrate the brightness of a single screen after bulb replacement (in Projection-based screens).

Reasons for using a video wall instead of a single large screen can include the ability to customize tile layouts, greater screen area per unit cost, and greater pixel density per unit cost, due to the economics of manufacturing single screens which are unusual in shape, size, or resolution.

Video walls are sometimes found in control rooms, stadiums, and other large public venues. Examples include the video wall in Oakland International Airport's baggage claim, where patrons are expected to observe the display at long distances, and the 100 screen video wall at McCarran International Airport, which serves as an advertising platform for the 40 million passengers passing through airport annually. Video walls can also benefit smaller venues when patrons may view the screens both up close and at a distance, respectively necessitating both high pixel density and large size. For example, the 100-inch video wall located in the main lobby of the Lafayette Library and Learning Center has enough size for the distant passerby to view photos while also providing the nearby observer enough resolution to read about upcoming events.

Simple video walls can be driven from multi-monitor video cards, however more complex arrangements may require specialized video processors, specifically designed to manage and drive large video walls. Software-based video wall technology that uses ordinary PCs, displays and networking equipment can also be used for video wall deployments.

The largest video wall as of 2013 was located at the backstretch of the Charlotte Motor Speedway motorsport track. Developed by Panasonic, it measures 200 by 80 feet (61 by 24 m) and uses LED technology. The Texas Motor Speedway installed an even larger screen in 2014, measuring 218 by 125 feet (66 by 38 m).

Video walls are not limited to a single purpose but are now being used in dozens of different applications.

== Controllers ==
A video wall controller (sometimes called "processor") is a device that splits a single image into parts to be displayed on individual screens. Video wall controllers can be divided into groups:

1. Hardware-based controllers.
2. Software-based PC & video-card controllers.

Hardware-based controllers are electronic devices built for specific purpose. They usually are built on array of video processing chipsets and do not have an operating system. The advantage of using a hardware video wall controller is high performance and reliability. Disadvantages include high cost and the lack of flexibility.

The most simple example of video wall controller is single input multiple outputs scaler. It accepts one video input and splits the image into parts corresponding to displays in the video wall.

Most of professional video wall displays also have built-in controller (sometimes called an integrated video matrix processor or splitter). This matrix splitter allows to "stretch" the image from a single video input across all the displays within the whole video wall (typically arranged in a linear matrix, e.g., 2x2, 4x4, etc.). These types of displays typically have loop-through output (usually DVI) that allows installers to daisy-chain all displays and feed them with the same input. Typically setup is done via the remote control and the on-screen display. It is a fairly simple method to build a video wall but it has some disadvantages. First of all, it is impossible to use full pixel resolution of the video wall because the resolution cannot be bigger than the resolution of the input signal. It is also not possible to display multiple inputs at the same time.

Software-based PC & video-card controllers is a computer running an operating system (e.g., Windows, Linux, Mac) in a PC or server equipped with special multiple-output graphic cards and optionally with video capture input cards. These video wall controllers are often built on industrial-grade chassis due to the reliability requirements of control rooms and situational centers. Though this approach is typically more expensive, the advantage of a software-based video wall controller vs the hardware splitter is that it can launch applications like maps, VoIP client (to display IP cameras), SCADA clients, Digital Signage software that can directly utilize the full resolution of the video wall. That is why software-based controllers are widely used in control rooms and high-end Digital Signage. The performance of the software controller depends on both the quality of graphic cards and management software. There are a number of multi-head (multiple output) graphic cards commercially available. Most of general purpose multi-output cards manufactured by AMD (Eyefinity technology), NVidia (Mosaic technology) support up to 6-12 genlocked outputs. General purpose cards also do not have optimizations for displaying multiple video streams from capture cards. To achieve larger number of displays or high video input performance one needs to use specialized graphic cards (e.g. Datapath Limited, Matrox Graphics, Jupiter Systems). Video wall controllers typically support bezel correction (outside frame of monitor) to correct for any bezel with LED displays or overlap the images to blend edges with projectors.

=== Matrix, grid and artistic layouts ===
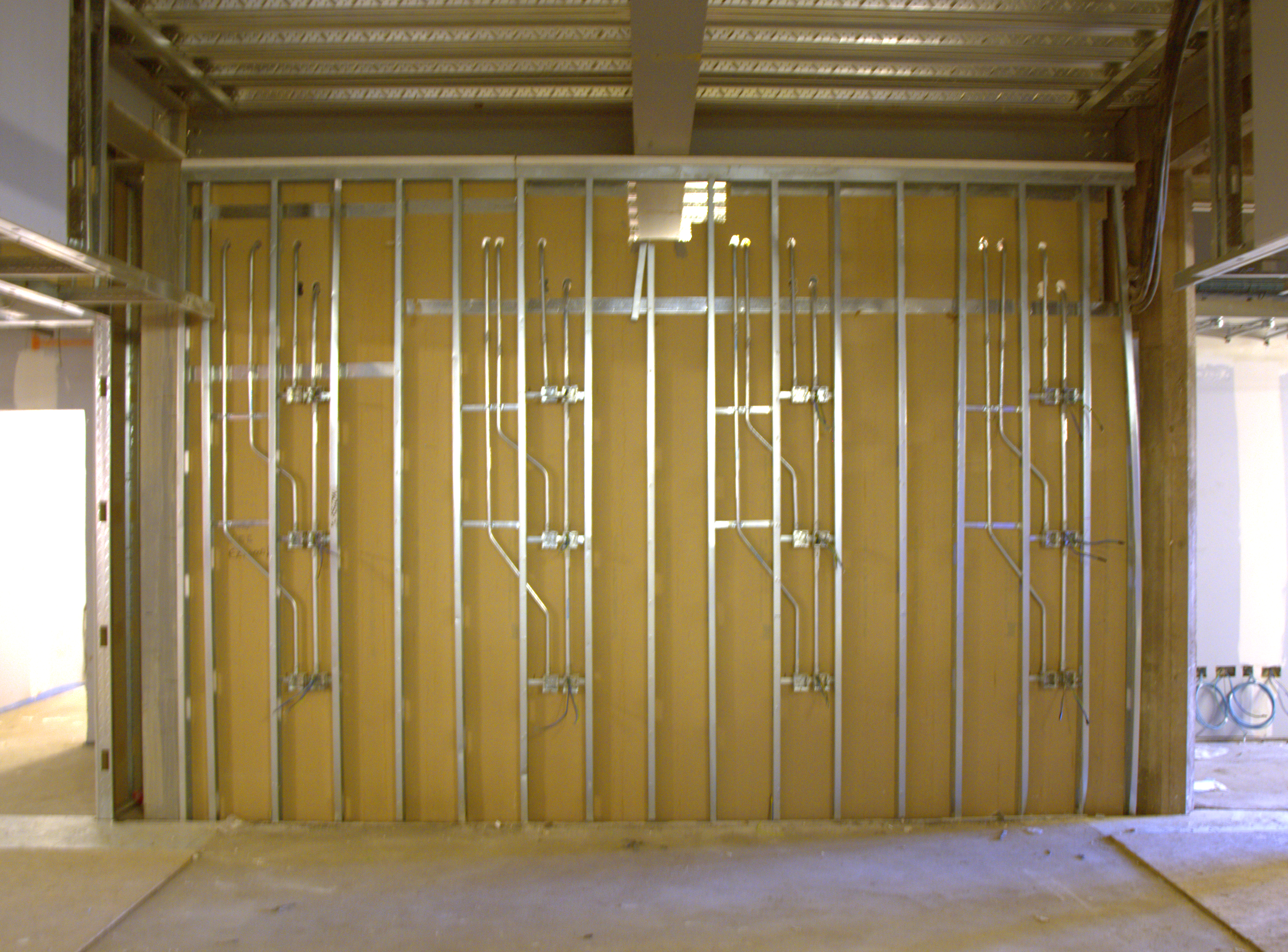
4x3 video wall under construction

The integrated video wall scalers are often limited to matrix grid layouts (e.g., 2x2, 3x3, 4x4, etc.) of identical displays. Here the aspect ratio remains the same but the source-image is scaled across the number of displays in the matrix. More advanced controllers enable grid layouts of any configuration (e.g., 1x5, 2x8, etc.) where the aspect ratio of the video wall can be very different from that of individual displays. Others enable displays to be placed anywhere within the canvas, but are limited to portrait or landscape orientation. The most advanced video wall controllers enable full artistic control of the displays, enabling a heterogeneous mix of different displays as well as 360deg multi-angle rotation of any individual display within the video wall canvas.

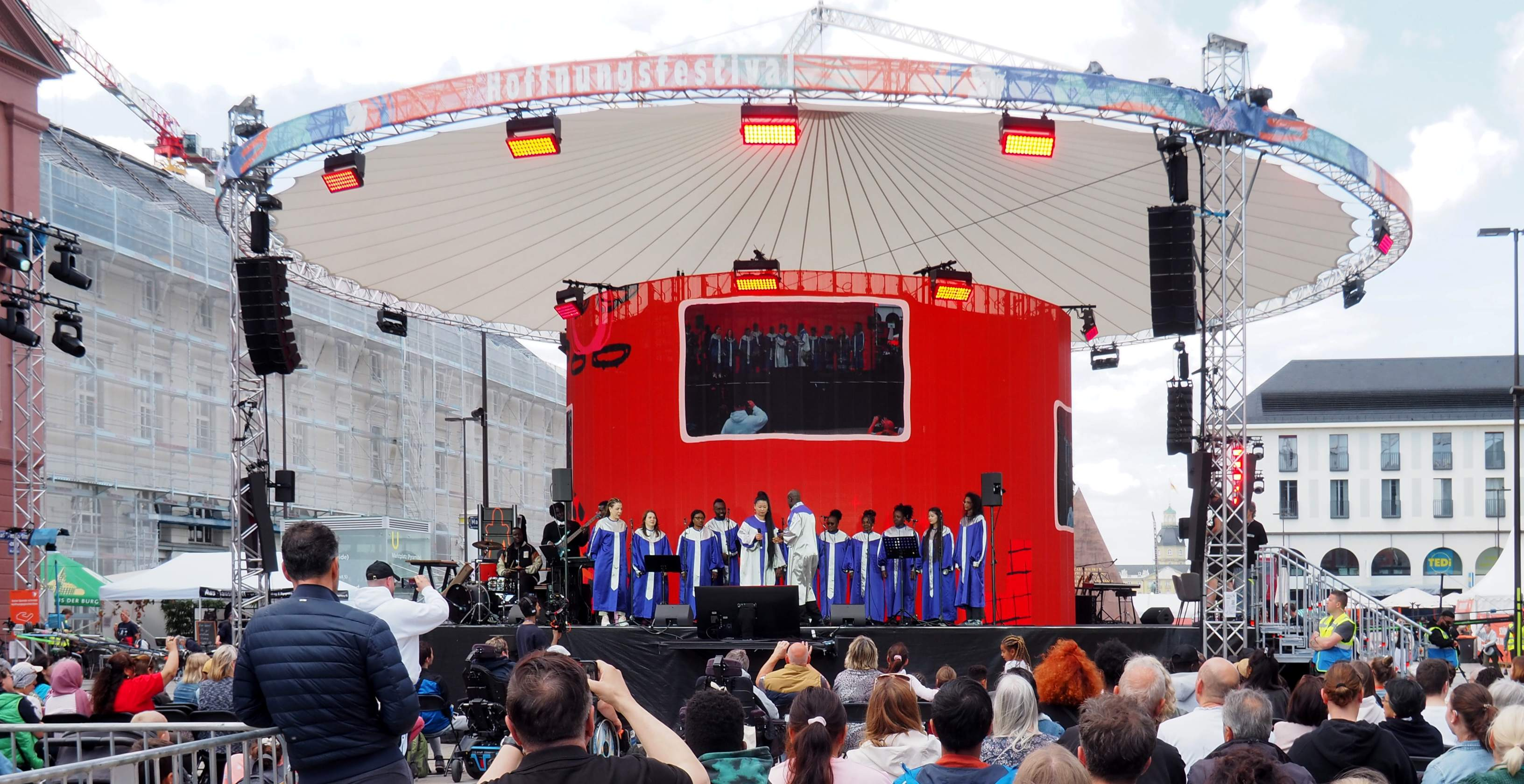
Endless video wall on a circular stage

=== Multiple simultaneous sources ===
Advanced video wall controllers will allow you to output multiple sources to groups of displays within the video wall and change these zones at will even during live playback. The more basic scalers only allow you to output a single source to the entire video wall.

=== Network video wall ===
Some video wall controllers can reside in the server room and communicate with their "graphics cards" over the network. This configuration offers advantages in terms of flexibility. Often this is achieved via a traditional video wall controller (with multiple graphics cards) in the server room with a "sender" device attached to each graphics output and a "receiver" attached to each display. These sender/receiver devices are either via Cat5e/Cat6 cable extension or via a more flexible and powerful "video over IP" that can be routed through traditional network switches. Even more advanced is a pure network video wall where the server does not require any video cards and communicates directly over the network with the receiver devices.

A network configuration allows video walls to be synchronized with individual digital signs. This means that video walls of different sizes and configurations, as well as individual digital displays can all show the same content at the same time, referred to as 'mirroring'.

=== Transparent video walls ===
Transparent video walls combine transparent LCD screens with a video wall controller to display video and still images on a large transparent surface. Transparent displays are available from a variety of companies and are common in retail and other environments that want to add digital signage to their window displays or in store promotions. Bezel-less transparent displays can be combined using certain video wall controllers to turn the individual displays into a video wall to cover a significantly larger surface.

== Rendering clusters ==
- Jason Leigh and others at the Electronic Visualization Laboratory, University of Illinois, Chicago, developed SAGE, the Scalable Adaptive Graphics Environment, allowing the seamless display of various networked applications over a large display wall (LDW) system. Different visualization applications such as 3D rendering, remote desktop, video streams, and 2D maps, stream their rendered pixels to a virtual high-resolution frame buffer on the LDW. Using a high-bandwidth network, remote visualization applications can feed the streams of the data into SAGE. The user interface of SAGE, which works as a separate display node, allows users to relocate and resize the visualization stream in a form of window, which can be found in a conventional graphical user interface. Depending on the location and size of the visualization stream window on the LDW, SAGE reroutes the stream to respective display nodes.
- Chromium is an OpenGL system for interactive rendering on graphics clusters. By providing a modified OpenGL library, Chromium can run OpenGL-based applications on a LDW with minimal or no changes. One clear advantage of Chromium is utilizing each rendering cluster and achieving high resolution visualization over a LDW. Chromium streams OpenGL commands from the `app' node to other display nodes of a LDW. The modified OpenGL library in system handles transferring OpenGL commands to necessary nodes based on their viewport and tile coordinates.
- David Hughes and others from SGI developed Media Fusion, an architecture designed to exploit the potential of a scalable shared memory and manage multiple visual streams of pixel data into 3D environments. It provides data management solution and interaction in immersive visualization environments. Its focus is streaming pixels across heterogeneous network over the Visual Area Network (VAN) similar to SAGE. However, it is designed for a small number of large displays. Since it relies on a relatively small resolution for the display, pixel data can be streamed under the fundamental limit of the network bandwidth. The system displays high-resolution still images, HD videos, live HD video streams and PC applications. Multiple feeds can be displayed on the wall simultaneously and users can reposition and resize each feed in much the same way they move and resize windows on a PC desktop. Each feed can be scaled up for viewing on several monitors or the entire wall instantly depending upon the user’s discretion.
- Imperial College London hosts 64 screen circular video wall called Data Observatory at Data Science Institute. Data Observatory has a distributed rendering cluster that can render interactive maps, data visualizations and multimedia scaled to 132 mega pixels.

== See also ==
- Multi-image
- Multi-monitor
- Video sculpture
- VESA
