= Peter Frohmader discography =

- Studio albums: 22
- EPs: 4
- Live albums: 3
- Compilation albums: 6

This article chronicles the complete oeuvre of German composer and multi-instrumentalist Peter Frohmader, from his first studio recordings published in 1979 to his death in 2022. It also includes his work under his Nekropolis moniker as well as his collaborative efforts with other musicians.

== As a solo artist ==
=== Studio albums ===
Year	Title
1986	Orakel / Tiefe
1986	Ritual
1987	Jules Verne Cycle
1987	Homunculus, Vol. 1
1987	Homunculus, Vol. 2
1988	Through Time and Mystery – Ending
1989	Miniatures
1990	Macrocosm
1991	Armorika
1994	Cycle of Eternity
1994	Advanced Alchemy of Music
2001	2001
2003	Eismeer

=== Collaborative albums ===
Year	Title	Artist	Notes
1999	Fossil Culture	Peter Frohmader / Richard Pinhas	Collaboration album with Richard Pinhas.
2000	Space Icon	Artemiy Artemiev & Peter Frohmader	Collaboration album with Artemiy Artemiev.
2000	Das Ist Alles	Peter Frohmader & Fuchs-Gamböck	Collaboration album with Michael Fuchs-Gamböck.
2002	Transfiguration	Artemiy Artemiev & Peter Frohmader	Collaboration album with Artemiy Artemiev.

=== Live albums ===
Title	Album details
Kanaan Live 1975	Released: 2000 (DE); Label: Green Tree; Formats: CD

=== EPs ===
Title	Album details
2 Compositions	Released: 1983 (DE); Label: Nekropolis; Formats: LP
The Forgotten Enemy	Released: 1985 (DE); Label: Hasch Platten; Formats: LP
Wintermusic / Bass Symphony No. 3	Released: 1987 (SE); Label: Multimood; Formats: LP

=== Compilation albums ===
Title	Album details
3rd Millennium's Choice, Vol. 1	Released: 1990 (DE); Label: Nekropolis; Formats: CD
3rd Millennium's Choice, Vol. 2	Released: 1991 (DE); Label: Nekropolis; Formats: CD
Stringed Works	Released: 1994 (DE); Label: Multimood; Formats: CD
Gate	Released: 1995 (DE); Label: Atonal; Formats: CD
Homunculus Parts 1-4 + Ritual	Released: 1995 (SE); Label: Multimood; Formats: CD

== As Nekropolis ==
=== Studio albums ===
Year	Title
1979	Musik aus dem Schattenreich
1982	Nekropolis 2
1985	Cultes des Goules
1988	Spheres
2003	Anubis Dance
2003	Vol. 1

=== Live albums ===
Title	Album details
Live	Released: 1983 (DE); Label: Schneeball; Formats: LP
The Awakening	Released: 1997 (DE); Label: Ohrwaschl; Formats: CD

=== Compilation albums ===
Title	Album details
Nekropolis 81 Volume I-IV	Released: 2013 (DE); Label: Vinyl On Demand; Formats: LP
