= Reale Museo di Fisica e Storia Naturale =

- Established: 1775
- Dissolved: 1878
- Location: Palazzo Torrigiani, Via Romana 16, Florence, Italy
- Type: scientific museum
- Founder: Grand Duke Peter Leopold of Habsburg-Lorraine
- Directors: Felice Fontana, Giovanni Fabbroni, Vincenzo Antinori, Cosimo Ridolfi, Filippo Parlatore and Carlo Matteucci

The Reale Museo di Fisica e Storia Naturale (Royal Museum of Physics and Natural History) was an Italian museum founded on 22 February 1775 in Florence that survived until 1878, when its collections were split up in various Florentine museums.

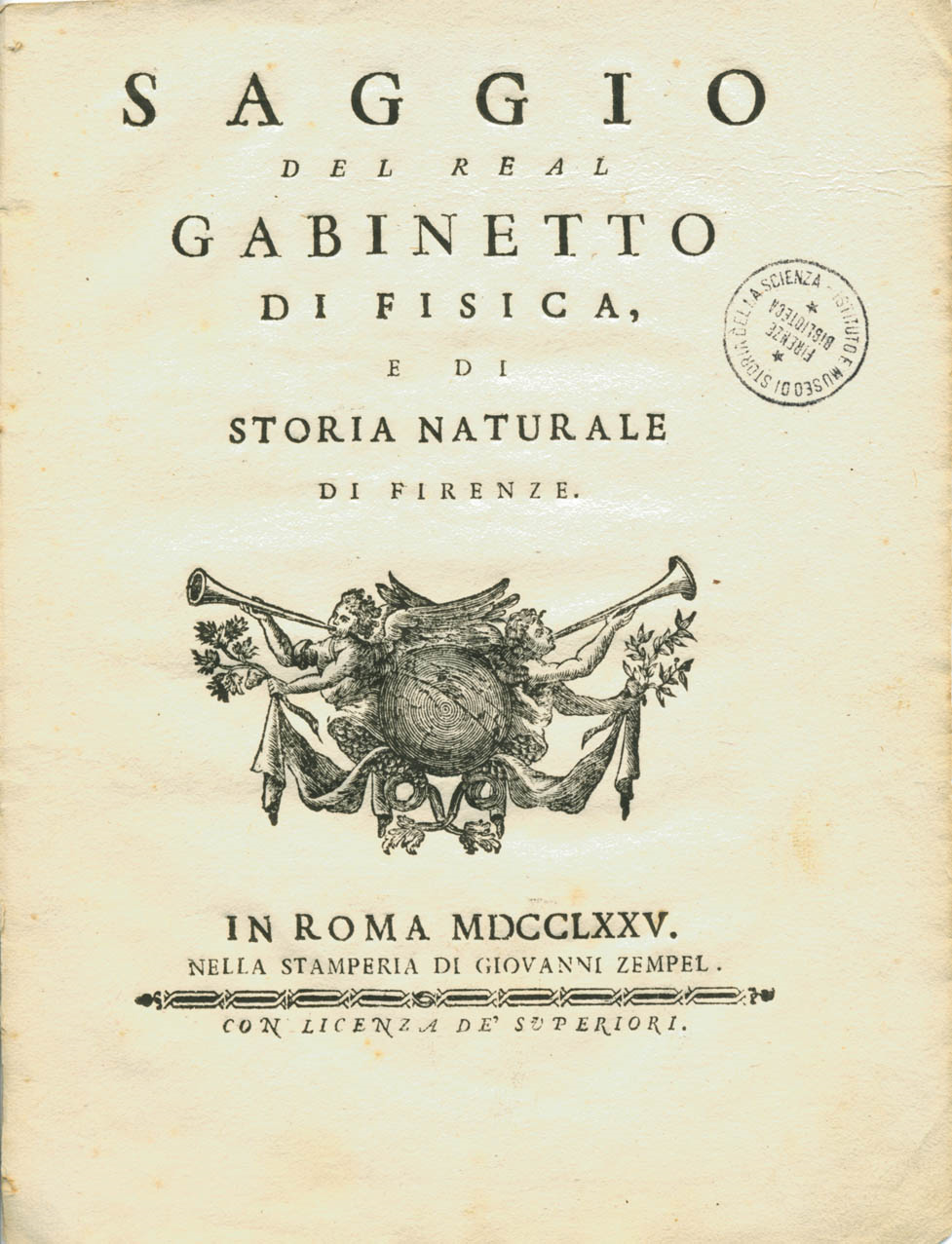
Saggio del Real gabinetto di fisica e di storia naturale di Firenze (Roma, 1775)

== Origins ==
In the 1760s Grand Duke of Tuscany Peter Leopold, urged by the Florence scientific community, decided to rearrange the scientific and natural history collections that were put together by the Medici family and increased in the following centuries.

In 1763, physician and naturalist Giovanni Targioni Tozzetti had already catalogued the natural specimens housed in the Galleria Imperiale in Florence. In 1766, the Grand Duke instructed Trentine physiologist Felice Fontana to gather the collections of scientific instruments housed in the Pitti Palace. In 1771, he also collected a large part of the Medici instruments that were kept in the Stanzino delle Matematiche (Mathematics Room) of the Uffizi Gallery. Restoration works of the Torrigiani Palace, which had to become home to the Reale Museo di Fisica e Storia Naturale, began in 1772.

On the iniziative (initiatives) of the Grand Duke, Fontana was surrounded with a small group of young scholars which included Giovanni Fabbroni, with whom Fontana established a close relationship.

The museum was officially opened in 1775 under the direction of Fontana, who was supported by Fabbroni as deputy director.

== The Collections ==
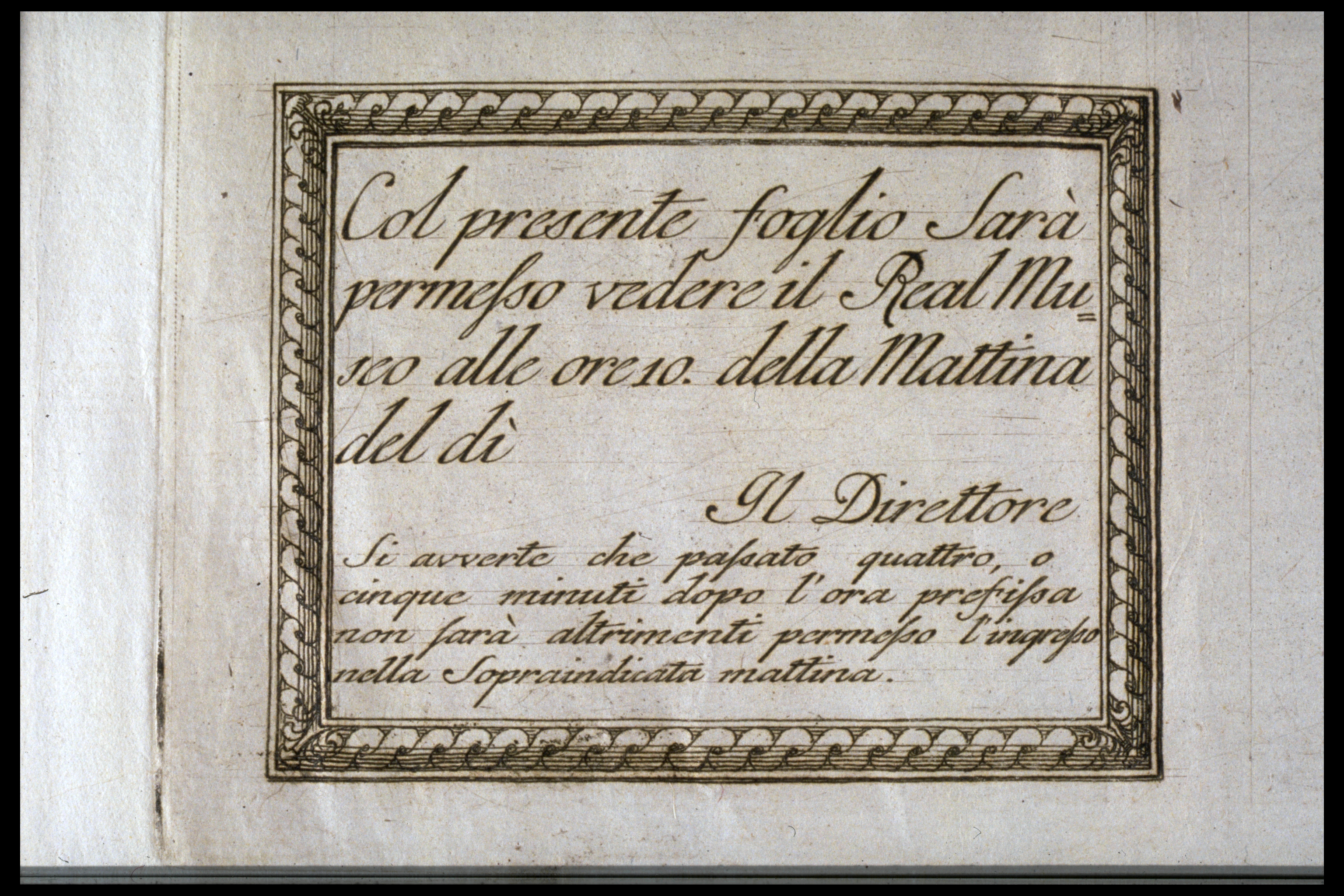
Ticket for the visit of the Royal Museum of Physics and Natural History of Florence

Since its foundation, the Reale Museo housed scientific instruments, natural specimens and a large collection of anatomical wax models that came from previous collections or were specially made to be displayed in the new museum.

The very first nucleus of the scientific instruments housed in the museum came from the physics laboratory in the Pitti Palace. Then came 202 objects from the Medici collections in the Uffizi Gallery, that comprised measuring, mathematical and astronomical instruments—including Galileo's geometrical and military compass and the lens he used to observe the sky, Egnazio Danti's instrument of the Primum Mobile, Giovan Battista Giusti's quadrants, Della Volpaia's sundials and nocturnals, and Antonio Santucci's armillary sphere. Finally, the instruments of the Accademia del Cimento were moved from the Pitti Palace to the Reale Museo as well.

As far as natural history specimens, the museum housed the collections rearranged by Targioni Tozzetti, including Pier Antonio Micheli's herbaria and the collections of Dutch naturalist Georg Everhard Rumph and Danish physician and geologist Niels Steensen.

The hiring of wax modeller Clemente Susini led to the creation of a great lot of anatomical wax models portraying human body's musculature, internal organs, bones, the eye, the ear, and the nose. Six rooms were needed to display all the wax models.

The collection first core was enlarged in the following years with new exhibits that were made—first for studying reasons, then especially for educational reasons by the workshops that were housed in the Torrigiani Palace since the Reale Museum's beginnings.

== The Botanical Garden and the Specola ==
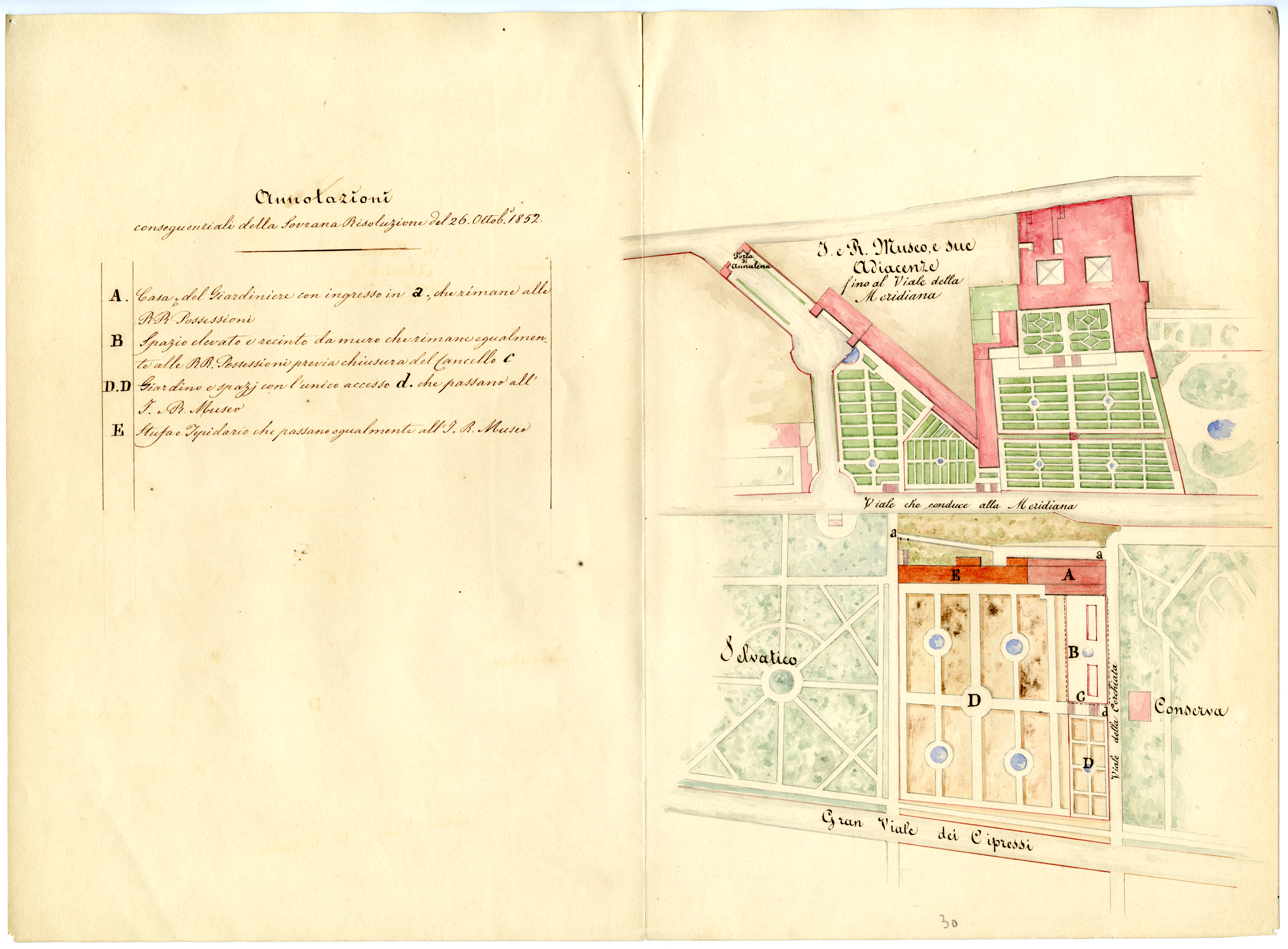
Map of the Royal Museum Botanical Garden

The Torrigiani Palace bordered Boboli Gardens and this was a good chance to create a botanical garden, whose direction was entrusted to Attilio Zuccagni. The garden sheltered several species of plants classified according to Linnaean taxonomy, that assigned an appropriate name and class to each plant, pointing out its possible medical use as well.

While the renovation works of the palace were underway, Fontana had already a mind to turn the Torrino (small tower) into an astronomical and meteorological observatory. When in 1775 he met Johann III Bernoulli, astronomer to the King of Prussia and director of the Berlin observatory, Fontana asked him some suggestions, but the grand-ducal court agreed only partly with Bernoulli's ideas. The shortage of skilled craftsmen made Fontana decide to buy the needed instruments in London. The great expenses caused a big time lag in the completion of works, that continued until 1796, when Fabbroni assigned the astronomer Domenico de Vecchi the responsibility of reorganizing the observatory and beginning to collect astronomical data.

Fontana thought that the museum had to be arranged according to the order of nature, appropriately classified. The ground floor housed, in addition to the storerooms, minerals from Tuscany and the chemistry laboratory; the physics laboratory, the library and the zoology collections were located at the first floor; wax models, stuffed animals, fossils, and precious stones were on display at the second floor. Visitors and scholars were thus able to travel from microcosm chemistry through the elements of nature, to macrocosm astronomy in the observatory.

== The Liceo ==
Fontana would have liked to found a "society of scientists"—a new Accademia del Cimento—aimed at researching and disseminating new discoveries, but the grand-ducal court didn't support his plan because it was too expensive. Fabbroni, who took Fontana's place as museum director in 1805, complemented research with educational activity. But it was only his successor, Girolamo Bardi, who was able to open a liceo [high school] in the Torrigiani Place in 1807.

The first chairs to be established were Botanics and Anatomy—hold by Ottaviano Targioni Tozzetti and the surgeon Filippo Uccelli respectively—but four more were soon created. The subjects taught in the liceo were six, namely Chemistry, Experimental and theoretical physics, Astronomy, Natural history, and Comparative anatomy.

The liceo was actually a short-life adventure, because Grand Duke Ferdinand III of Lorraine who came back into power after Napoleon I's fall wanted the museum to interrupt educational activities and go back to conservation and research.

Vincenzo Antinori, who became the museum director in 1829, started again the pedagogical project and established the chairs of Physics, Comparative anatomy and zoology, and mineralogy and geology, which were granted to Leopoldo Nobili, Gaspero Mazzi and Filippo Nesti respectively. Educational and museological duties were closely connected as the full professors were the curators of the collections as well. New chairs were created in the following years, so making the liceo a more and more important institute for both specialized studies and research.

== The Italian Central Meteorological Archives ==
In 1839, on the occasion of the First Conference of Italian Scientists in Pisa, the attendees celebrated the development of meteorological studies and stressed the need for turning meteorology into a science. The museum welcomed this hope and in 1844 released a memorandum asking Italian observatories to help in the creation of a Central Meteorological Archives. The goal was collecting, arranging and publishing all data from meteorological observations in Italy. Cooperation and the exchange of information was regarded as the condition necessary to the advancement of meteorology in Italy and worldwide. Accordingly, the Archives established a close network of relationships with observatories as well as European and US. scientists.

== The Move of Collections ==
In 1859 the museum was turned into the section of Physical and Natural Sciences of the Istituto di Studi Superiori Pratici e di Perfezionamento (Institute for Advanced and Specialized Studies), that was founded in Florence by the Provisional Government of Tuscany.

From then on, educational activities, research and conservation of the collections became more and more separated. In 1872 astronomical observations were moved to the new Observatory at Arcetri. The instruments and machines used for teaching were placed in the various sections of the Istituto, which were destined to become the departments of the University of Florence. Zoology collections remained in the Torrigiani Palace, which is today home to La Specola Museum. Botanical specimens were gathered in the Giardino dei Semplici (the botanical garden). The exhibit of historical instruments in the Tribune of Galileo and the adjacent rooms remained unchanged and in 1874 was named Museo degli Strumenti Antichi di Astronomia e di Fisica (Museum of Ancient Astronomical and Physics Instruments). In 1875, Ferdinando Meucci began to catalogue those instruments that in 1929, after some ups and downs, became the patrimony of the Istituto e Museo di Storia della Scienza—today's Museo Galileo.

== The Archives of the Reale Museo ==
Archival records produced by the Reale Museo between 1780 and 1872, which were first stored in the Department of Physics at the University of Florence, are today housed in the Museo Galileo's Library.

This collection is the most important source to reconstruct the history of the Reale Museo and its relationships with the main scientific institutions in Europe as well as to know the many instruments of the museum collections and the related events.

== Bibliography and Further reading ==
- Contardi, Simone (2002). La casa di Salomone a Firenze: l'Imperiale e Reale Museo di fisica e storia naturale (1775–1801) (in Italian). Firenze: L.S. Olschki. ISBN 88-222-5092-3.
- Pasta, Renato (1989). Scienza politica e rivoluzione: l'opera di Giovanni Fabbroni (1752-1822) intellettuale e funzionario al servizio dei Lorena (in Italian). L.S. Olschki. ISBN 88-22-23653-X.
- Contardi, Simone (1996). "Unità del sapere e pubblica utilità: Felice Fontana e le collezioni di fisica dell'Imperiale e regio museo". Politica della scienza: Toscana e stati italiani nel tardo Settecento. Atti del Convegno di Firenze, 27-29 gennaio 1994. Biblioteca di Nuncius (in Italian). Firenze: L. S. Olschki. pp. 279–293. ISBN 88-222-4383-8.
- Miniati, Mara (1997). "Il Museo di fisica e storia naturale". La corte in archivio: apparati, cultura, arte e spettacoli alla corte lorenese di Toscana, Archivio di Stato di Firenze, 15 dicembre 1997-15 marzo 1998 (in Italian). Livorno: Sillabe. pp. 49–58. ISBN 88-863-9238-9.
- Pellegrini, Licia (1986). "Il Reale museo di fisica e storia naturale nell'età di Pietro Leopoldo". Paragone-Arte (in Italian). 37 n. 437: 79–92.
- Contardi, Simone (2000). "Concezioni museali e collezionismo scientifico nella Toscana settecentesca: l'Imperiale e regio museo di fisica e storia naturale di Firenze". Giuseppe Toaldo e il suo tempo nel bicentenario della morte: scienze e lumi tra Veneto e Europa, Atti del Convegno, Padova, 10–13 novembre 1997 (in Italian). Cittadella: Bertoncello artigrafiche. pp. 447–462. ISBN 88-86868-11-1.
- Contardi, Simone (2000). "Ideale enciclopedico del sapere e concezione museale nell'Imperiale e Regio Museo di Firenze". Segni e percorsi della modernità: Saggi in onore di Paolo Rossi (in Italian): 109–122.
- Contardi, Simone (2006). "The origins of a scientific institution: Felice Fontana and the birth of the Reale Museo di fisica e storia naturale di Firenze". Nuncius. 21 n. 2 (2): 251–263. doi:10.1163/221058706X00630.
- Fantoni, Lucia; Cellai, Giovanna (2006). "Il giardino dell'Imperiale e Reale Museo di fisica e storia naturale di Firenze dalle origini alla gestione di Ottaviano Targioni Tozzetti". Rivista di storia dell'agricoltura (in Italian). 46 n. 2: 139–160.
- Miniati, Mara (2009). Firenze scienza: le collezioni, i luoghi e i personaggi dell'Ottocento (in Italian). Firenze: Polistampa. ISBN 978-88-596-0672-7.
- Poggesi, Marta (2011). "La Specola: dall'Imperial Regio Museo di fisica e storia naturale alla Sezione di zoologia del Museo di storia naturale dell'Università di Firenze". Museologia Scientifica. Memorie (in Italian). 7 (Musei scientifici universitari: una grande risorsa culturale da valorizzare): 90–98.
- Contardi, Simone (2012). "The Museum of Physics and Natural History". Annali del Laboratorio Museotecnico. 5 (Displaying scientific instruments: from the Medici wardrobe to the Museo Galileo): 19–28.
- Miniati, Mara (2012). "From the Museum of Physics to the Museum of Ancient Instruments". Annali del Laboratorio Museotecnico. 5 (Displaying scientific instruments: from the Medici wardrobe to the Museo Galileo): 37–43.
