= Cosm =

Cosm, COSM, or CoSM may refer to:

- COSM, an album by Tech N9ne, 2025
- COSM (Composite Object Sound Modeling), a sound modeling technology
- Cosm (software), a family of open distributed computing software and protocols
- Cosm (company), a virtual reality technology provider and entertainment venue operator
- Chapel of Sacred Mirrors, in Wappinger, New York, USA
- Xively, an internet of things platform previously known as Cosm

== See also ==
- Microcosm (disambiguation)
- Macrocosm (disambiguation)
