= Spheres (Nekropolis album) =

Studio album by Nekropolis
- Released: 1988
- Genre: New-age
- Length: 47:11
- Label: Nekropolis
- Producer: Peter Frohmader

Nekropolis chronology
Through Time and Mystery – Ending (1988)	Spheres (1988)	Miniatures (1989)

Spheres is the fourth studio album by Nekropolis, released independently in 1988.

== Track listing ==
All music is composed by Peter Frohmader

Side one
No.	Title	Length
1.	"Spirit of Nature"	23:08

Side two
No.	Title	Length
1.	"Exotic Waves"	10:37
2.	"Rain Music"	13:26

== Personnel ==
Adapted from the Spheres liner notes.

- Peter Frohmader – electronics

== Release history ==
Region	Date	Label	Format	Catalog
Germany	1988	Nekropolis	CS	NC-7
