= Vol. 1 (Nekropolis album) =

Studio album by Nekropolis
- Released: 2003
- Recorded: March 10 – April 28, 2003
- Studio: Drum Art Studio, Munich
- Genre: Progressive electronic
- Length: 77:47
- Label: Nekropolis

Peter Frohmader chronology
Anubis Dance (2003)	Vol. 1 (2003)

Vol. 1 is the sixth studio album by Nekropolis, released independently in 2003.

== Track listing ==
All music is composed by Peter Frohmader

No.	Title	Length
1.	"Behind the Wall of Sleep"	16:03
2.	"Devachan"	11:08
3.	"Grey Dawn of Day"	21:29
4.	"Dusk Express"	13:37
5.	"Nightfall"	15:30

== Personnel ==
Adapted from the Vol. 1 liner notes.

- Matthias Friedrich – violin
- Peter Frohmader – five-string bass guitar, fretless bass guitar, cover art
- Udo Gerhards – piano, synthesizer, harmonium
- Holger Röder – drums, cymbal

== Release history ==
Region	Date	Label	Format	Catalog
Germany	2003	Nekropolis	CD	NCD 011
