= Jules Verne Cycle =

Studio album by Peter Frohmader
- Released: 1987
- Recorded: 1982
- Studio: Nekropolis Studio (Munich, DE)
- Genre: Progressive electronic, dark ambient
- Length: 46:02
- Label: Auricle
- Producer: Peter Frohmader

Peter Frohmader chronology
Ritual (1986)	Jules Verne Cycle (1987)	Homunculus, Vol. 1 (1987)

Jules Verne Cycle is the third studio album by Peter Frohmader, released in 1987 by Auricle Records. It was remastered and issued on CD for the first time on October 13, 2014 by Cosmic Egg for a limited run of 20 pressings.

== Track listing ==
All music is composed by Peter Frohmader

Side one
No.	Title	Length
1.	"Mysterious Island"	22:48

Side two
No.	Title	Length
1.	"Nautilus"	22:59

== Personnel ==
Adapted from the Jules Verne Cycle liner notes.

- Peter Frohmader – synthesizer, Rhodes piano, percussion, acoustic piano (A-side), acoustic twelve-string guitar (A-side), production, recording, cover art

== Release history ==
Region	Date	Label	Format	Catalog
United Kingdom	1987	Auricle	CS	AMC 018
United Kingdom	2014	Cosmic Egg	CD	UTCE 012
