= Homunculus, Vol. 1 =

Studio album by Peter Frohmader
- Released: 1987
- Recorded: 1985
- Studio: Nekropolis Studio (Munich, DE)
- Genre: Progressive electronic, dark ambient
- Length: 44:08
- Label: Nekropolis
- Producer: Peter Frohmader

Peter Frohmader chronology
Jules Verne Cycle (1987)	Homunculus, Vol. 1 (1987)	Homunculus, Vol. 2 (1987)

Homunculus, Vol. 1 is the fourth studio album by Peter Frohmader, released independently in 1987.

== Track listing ==
All music is composed by Peter Frohmader

Side one
No.	Title	Length
1.	"Part 1"	22:20

Side two
No.	Title	Length
1.	"Part 2"	21:48

== Personnel ==
Adapted from the Homunculus, Vol. 1 liner notes.

- Peter Frohmader – electronics, musical arrangement, production, engineering, mixing, cover art, design, photography
- The Homunculus Orchestra – instruments
- Birgit Metzger – vocals

== Release history ==
Region	Date	Label	Format	Catalog
Germany	1987	Nekropolis	LP	220 173
