= Vincenzo Antinori =

Science administrator

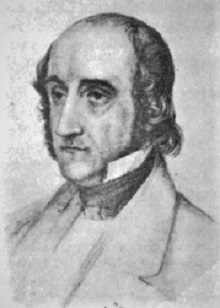
- Born: 1792
- Died: 1865 (aged 72–73); Italy
- Occupation: Science administrator
- Organizations: Regal Museum of Physics and Natural History, Accademia della Crusca
- Known for: Director of the Regal Museum of Physics and Natural History in Florence, promoter of Italian meteorological data archive, work on electromagnetic induction
- Notable work: Contributions to the Congress of Italian Scientists, establishment of the Italian Meteorological Archive

Vincenzo Antinori (1792–1865) was a science administrator in Italy.

From 1829 to 1859, Antinori was director of the Regal Museum of Physics and Natural History in Florence where he worked with Leopoldo Nobili on electromagnetic induction. He had originally attracted Nobili to Florence to teach physics, as he had Giovanni Battista Amici to teach astronomy.

He was one of the promoters of the Congress of Italian Scientists in Pisa in 1839 and in Florence in 1841 and was responsible for bringing permanence, order and security to the Italian legacy of meteorological data by founding the Italian Meteorological Archive.

Antinori was a member of the Accademia della Crusca and wrote many entries for the Crusca dictionary on scientific topics. He had a particular interest in preserving and interpreting documents and artefacts from the work of Galileo Galilei and his followers.

== Honours and positions ==
=== Honours ===
- Knight of Grace of the Order of Saint Stephen. (Grand Duchy of Tuscany)
- Knight commander of the Order of Saint Joseph. (Grand Duchy of Tuscany)

=== Positions ===
- Chamberlain of His Imperial and Royal Highness the Grand Duke of Tuscany.
- Director of the Museo di Fisica e di Storia Naturale di Firenze.
- Scientific Member of the Academia Toscana d'Arte e Manifatture.

== Bibliography ==
- "Antonio Meucci e la città di Firenze. Tra scienza, tecnica e ingegneria". Editado por Angotti, Franco, Giuseppe Pelosi
