= Orakel / Tiefe =

Studio album by Peter Frohmader
- Released: 1986
- Recorded: 1983
- Studio: Nekropolis Studio (Munich, DE)
- Genre: Progressive electronic, dark ambient
- Length: 45:37
- Label: Auricle/Dark Star
- Producer: Peter Frohmader

Peter Frohmader chronology
Cultes des Goules (1985)	Orakel / Tiefe (1986)	Ritual (1986)

Orakel / Tiefe is the debut studio album of Peter Frohmader, released in 1986 by Auricle and Dark Star Records. It was remastered and issued on CD for the first time on October 13, 2014, by Cosmic Egg for a limited run of 20 pressings.

== Track listing ==
All music is composed by Peter Frohmader

Side one
No.	Title	Length
1.	"Orakel"	22:52

Side two
No.	Title	Length
1.	"Tiefe"	22:45

== Personnel ==
Adapted from the Orakel / Tiefe liner notes.

Musicians

- Peter Frohmader – PPG Wave synthesizer, gongs (A), timpani (A), production, recording, cover art
- Rudi Haunreiter – drums (A), timpani (A)
- Stephan Manus – violin (A)

Production and additional personnel

- H. R. Giger – photography

== Release history ==
Region	Date	Label	Format	Catalog
United Kingdom	1986	Auricle	CS	AMC 011
United Kingdom	1986	Dark Star	CS	DSI 2
United Kingdom	2014	Cosmic Egg	CD	UTCE 010
