= Kanaan Live 1975 =

Live album by Peter Frohmader
- Released: October 9, 2000
- Recorded: 1975 in Munich, Germany
- Genre: Krautrock
- Length: 76:38
- Label: Green Tree

Peter Frohmader chronology
Space Icon (2000)	Kanaan Live 1975 (2000)	Das Ist Alles (2000)

Kanaan Live 1975 is a live performance album by Peter Frohmader, released on October 9, 2000 by Green Tree Records.

== Track listing ==
All music is composed by Peter Frohmader.

No.	Title	Length
1.	"Bizarro"	15:33
2.	"Rupscake"	7:50
3.	"Spaced Out"	13:00
4.	"Muzak für Beknackte"	21:08
5.	"Starnberger Prinzenschießen"	7:30
6.	"Flash Gelée"	5:57
7.	"Bulla-Bulla"	2:35
8.	"Paranoia Frame"	3:05

== Personnel ==
Adapted from the Kanaan Live 1975 liner notes.

Musicians

- Peter Frohmader – fretless bass guitar, electronics, gong, voice, cover art
- Uwe Rüdiger – drums, trumpet, voice
- Michael Schobert – Rhodes piano, synthesizer, voice

== Release history ==
Region	Date	Label	Format	Catalog
Germany	2000	Green Tree	CD	GTR 082
