= Gate (album) =

Compilation album by Peter Frohmader
- Released: 1995
- Recorded: 1988 – 1994
- Studio: Nekropolis Studio, Munich
- Genre: Progressive electronic
- Length: 70:50
- Label: Atonal
- Producer: Peter Frohmader

Peter Frohmader chronology
Stringed Works (1994)	Gate (1995)	Homunculus Parts 1-4 + Ritual (1995)

Gate is a compilation album by German electronic composer Peter Frohmader, released in 1995 by Atonal Records.

== Track listing ==
All music is composed by Peter Frohmader.

No.	Title	Length
1.	"Nunc et Semper"	13:14
2.	"Hator"	8:28
3.	"Le Sacre Technique"	6:18
4.	"Strange Door"	8:08
5.	"Waft From Ancient Egypt"	5:13
6.	"Sirius Connection"	9:20
7.	"Highlander's Voyage"	20:09

== Personnel ==
Adapted from the Gate liner notes.

- Peter Frohmader – fretless bass guitar, sampler, synthesizer, production

== Release history ==
Region	Date	Label	Format	Catalog
Germany	1995	Atonal	CD	ACD 3018
