= Leopoldo Nobili =

Italian physicist (1784–1835)

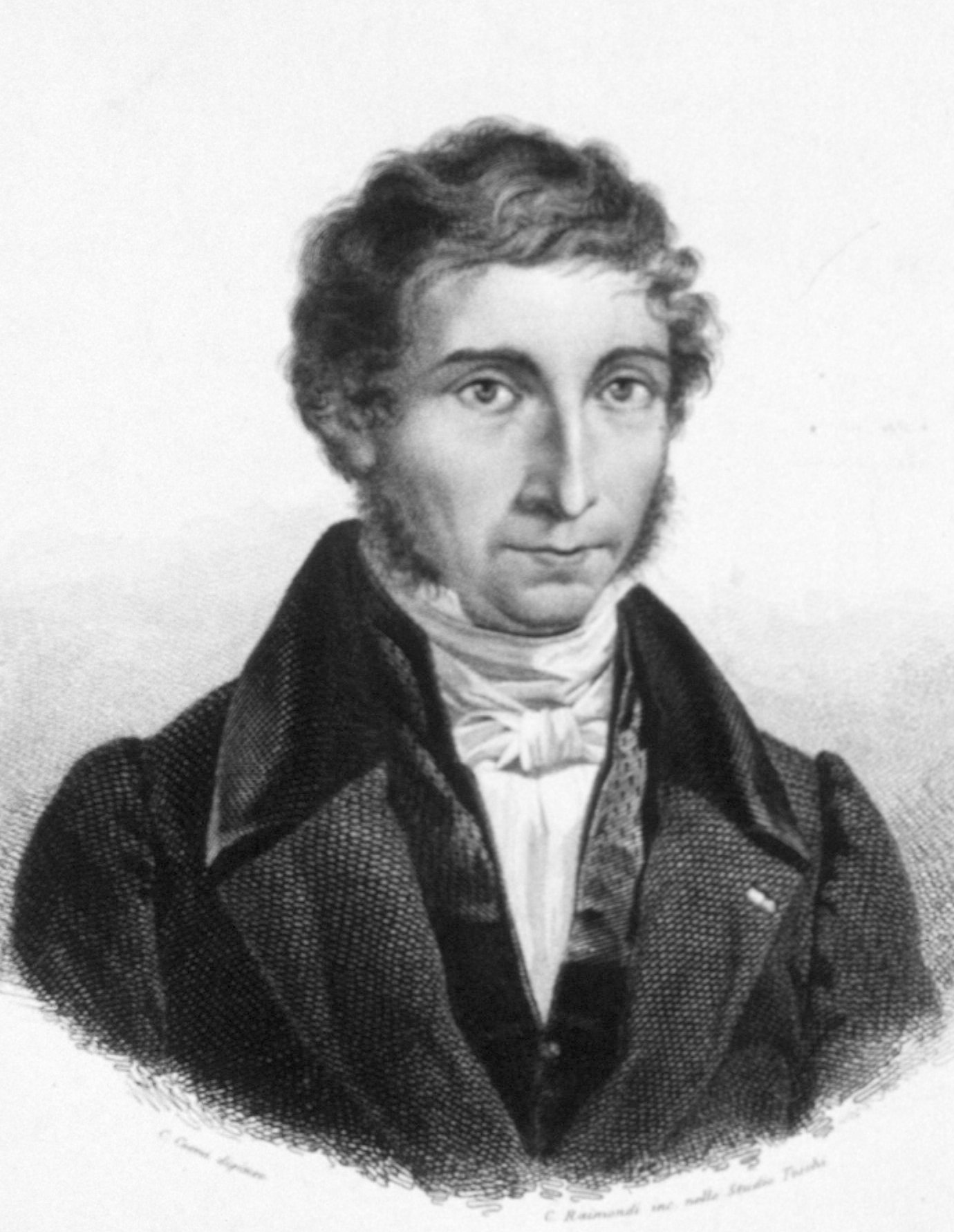
- Born: 5 July 1784; Trassilico
- Died: 22 August 1835 (aged 51); Florence

Leopoldo Nobili, born on 5 July 1784 in Trassilico (Toscana) and died on 22 August 1835 in Florence, was an Italian physicist who invented a number of instruments critical to investigating thermodynamics and electrochemistry.

Born Trassilico, Garfagnana, after attending the Military Academy of Modena he became an artillery officer. He was awarded the Légion d'honneur for his service in Napoleon's invasion of Russia.

In 1825, he developed the astatic galvanometer.

Nobili's Galvanometer
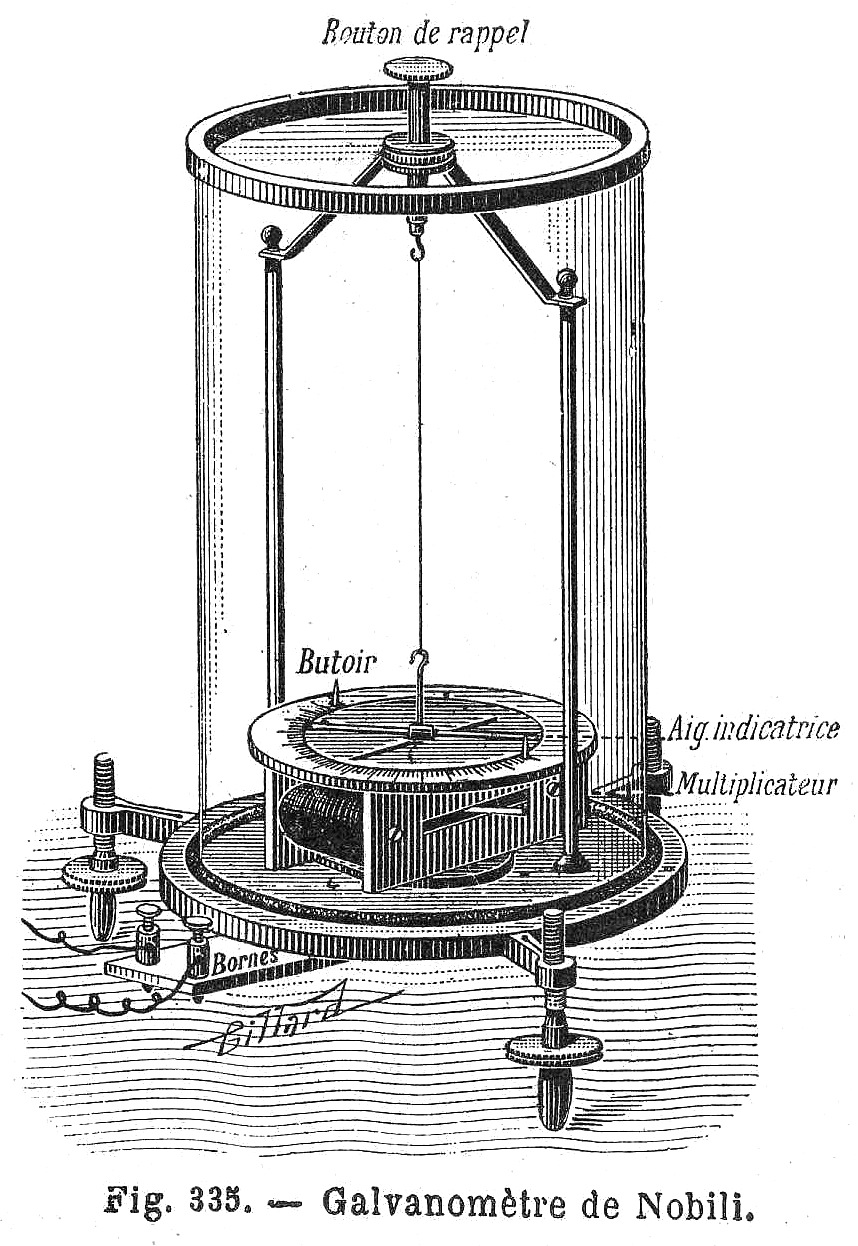
Schematics of Nobili's Galvanometer

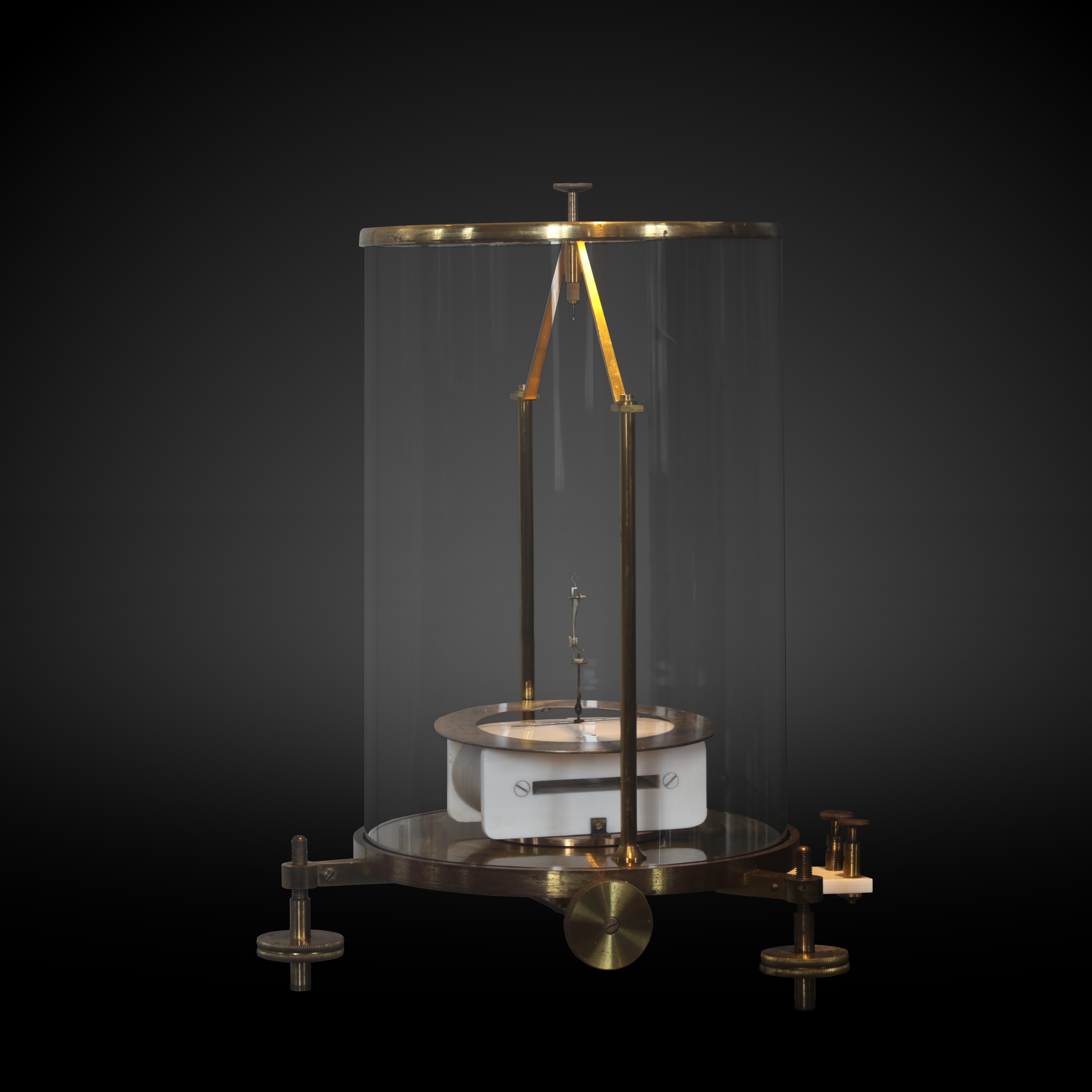
Galvanometer on display at MHS Geneva

He worked with Macedonio Melloni on the thermomultiplier, a combination of thermopile and galvanometer, before being appointed professor of physics at the Reale Museo di Fisica e Storia Naturale (Royal Museum of Physics and Natural History) in Florence where he worked with Vincenzo Antinori on electromagnetic induction.

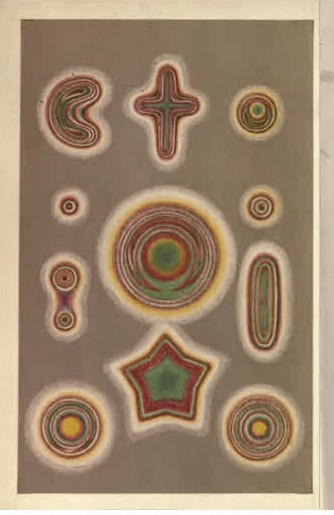
'Nobili's Rings', picture from book A.Watt – Electro-deposition : a practical treatise on the electrolysis of gold, silver, copper, nickel, and other metals, and alloys, with descriptions of voltaic batteries, magneto and dynamo-electric machines, thermopiles, and of the materials and processes used in every department of the art and several chapters on electrometallurgy, London 1887.

He was also credited with the discovery of 'Nobili's Rings'. "When a dilute solution of copper acetate is placed on a bright silver plate and a strip of zinc is touched to the silver beneath the copper, a series of rings of copper are formed by electrolysis around the zinc."

== Works ==
- Introduzione alla meccanica della materia (in Italian). Milano: Paolo Emilio Giusti. 1819.
- Questioni sul magnetismo (in Italian). Milano: eredi Soliani. 1824.
