= Miniatures (Nekropolis album) =

Studio album by Nekropolis
- Released: 1989
- Recorded: Nekropolis Studio, Munich, Germany
- Genre: Progressive electronic
- Length: 64:52
- Label: Nekropolis
- Producer: Peter Frohmader

Peter Frohmader chronology
Spheres (1988)	Miniatures (1989)	Macrocosm (1990)

Professional ratings
Review scores
Source	Rating
Allmusic	2.5/5 stars

Miniatures is the fifth studio album by Nekropolis, working under the moniker Nekropolis, released in 1989 by Nekropolis.

== Track listing ==
All music is composed by Peter Frohmader

No.	Title	Length
1.	"Miniature No. 26"	3:04
2.	"Miniature No. 20"	4:58
3.	"Miniature No. 19"	3:52
4.	"Miniature No. 27"	7:30
5.	"Miniature No. 16"	6:10
6.	"Miniature No. 25"	5:23
7.	"Miniature No. 24"	6:48
8.	"Miniature No. 22"	5:36
9.	"Miniature No. 23"	1:37
10.	"Miniature No. 21"	5:00
11.	"Miniature No. 18"	3:37
12.	"Miniature No. 17"	7:32
13.	"Miniature No. 28"	3:00

== Personnel ==
Adapted from the Miniatures liner notes.

- Peter Frohmader – bass guitar, sampler, synthesizer

== Release history ==
Region	Date	Label	Format	Catalog
Germany	1989	Nekropolis	CD	NCD 001
