= Cultes des Goules =

Studio album by Nekropolis
- Released: 1985
- Recorded: May – November 1981
- Studios: Nekropolis Studio (Munich, DE)
- Genres: Progressive electronic, dark ambient, experimental rock
- Length: 46:31
- Label: Nekropolis
- Producer: Peter Frohmader

Peter Frohmader chronology
The Forgotten Enemy (1985)	Cultes des Goules (1985)	Orakel / Tiefe (1986)

Cultes des Goules is the fourth studio album by the electronic artist Nekropolis. It was released independently in 1985.

The title of the album is no doubt inspired by the fictional grimoire Cultes des Goules by the Comte d'Erlette (see Books in the Cthulhu Mythos, which was invented by horror writer Robert Bloch.

== Track listing ==
All music is composed by Peter Frohmader.

Side one
No.	Title	Length
1.	"Cultes des Goules" (Part 1)	22:26

Side two
No.	Title	Length
1.	"Cultes des Goules" (Part 2)	24:05

== Personnel ==
Adapted from the Cultes des Goules liner notes.

- Peter Frohmader – synthesizer, electronics, fretless bass guitar, eight-string bass guitar, twelve-string guitar, percussion, effects, choir, engineering, mixing, cover art

Musicians

- Stephan Manus – violin
- Birgit Metzger – vocals
- Oliver Plett – German flute
- Stefan Plett – alto saxophone

Production and additional personnel

- H. R. Giger – photography

== Release history ==
Region	Date	Label	Format	Catalog
Germany	1985	Nekropolis	LP	220 172
France	2000	Spalax	CD	SPALAXCD14572
