= Advanced Alchemy of Music =

Studio album by Peter Frohmader
- Released: 1994
- Recorded: 1992–1993
- Studios: Nekropolis Studio, Munich
- Genre: Electronic
- Length: 75:17
- Label: Nekropolis
- Producer: Peter Frohmader

Peter Frohmader chronology
Cycle of Eternity (1994)	Advanced Alchemy of Music (1994)	Stringed Works (1994)

Professional ratings
Review scores
Source	Rating
Allmusic	3/5 stars

Advanced Alchemy of Music is the tenth studio album by the German electronic composer Peter Frohmader, released independently in 1994.

== Track listing ==
All music is composed by Peter Frohmader.

No.	Title	Length
1.	"Dragon's Treasure"	11:52
2.	"Golden Dawn"	11:53
3.	"Ken of Salomon"	12:48
4.	"Phaethon"	14:04
5.	"La Forêt du Perceval"	13:55
6.	"Rose + Croix"	10:14

== Personnel ==
Adapted from the Advanced Alchemy of Music liner notes.

- Peter Frohmader – instruments, musical arrangement, recording, mastering, illustrations, design

== Release history ==
Region	Date	Label	Format	Catalog
Germany	1994	Nekropolis	CD	NCD 007
