= Anubis Dance =

Studio album by Nekropolis
- Released: 2003
- Recorded: 1997
- Studios: Nekropolis Studio, Munich
- Genre: Progressive electronic
- Length: 76:58
- Label: Nekropolis

Peter Frohmader chronology
Eismeer (2003)	Anubis Dance (2003)	Vol. 1 (2003)

Anubis Dance is the fifth studio album by Nekropolis, released independently in 2003.

== Track listing ==
All music is composed by Peter Frohmader.

No.	Title	Length
1.	"EnTrance"	7:33
2.	"Anubis Rising"	7:00
3.	"Initiation (Electro Arabesque)"	9:57
4.	"Ganesh"	8:50
5.	"Visitation"	8:30
6.	"No Panic"	10:26
7.	"Outer Limit"	7:35
8.	"Anubis Rising" (V.2)	7:05
9.	"No Panic" (V.2)	10:02

== Personnel ==
Adapted from the Anubis Dance liner notes.

- Peter Frohmader – instruments, cover art
- Pit Holzapfel – trombone (4)
- Holger Röder – drums (8, 9)

== Release history ==
Region	Date	Label	Format	Catalog
Germany	2003	Nekropolis	CD	NCD 010
