= Live (Nekropolis album) =

Live album by Nekropolis
- Released: 1983
- Recorded: July 25 – July 27, 1983 at Till's Werkstatt, Illbach
- Genre: Progressive electronic, dark ambient
- Length: 39:19
- Label: Schneeball
- Producer: Nekropolis

Peter Frohmader chronology
2 Compositions (1983)	Live (1983)	The Forgotten Enemy (1985)

Live is a live performance album by Nekropolis, released in 1983 by Schneeball.

== Track listing ==
All music is composed by Peter Frohmader.

Side one
No.	Title	Length
1.	"Hölle im Angesicht"	3:50
2.	"Tekeli-Li"	6:37
3.	"Neutronen-Symphonie"	7:36
4.	"Knochenmark I"	2:26

Side two
No.	Title	Length
1.	"Knochenmark II"	5:49
2.	"Kleine Aster"	6:43
3.	"Psychofarm"	3:10
4.	"Seuchenschatz"	3:08

1995 CD reissue bonus tracks
No.	Title	Length
9.	"Vorstadt im Föhn"	11:13
10.	"Tote Stadt"	9:13

== Personnel ==
Adapted from the Live liner notes.

Musicians

- Rudi Haunreiter – drums, percussion
- Peter Frohmader – bass guitar, Chapman Stick, tape, cover art
- Tillmann Obermaier – electric guitar, shehnai, horn

Production and additional personnel

- Jürgen Jung – voice
- Sonja Lang – recording, mixing
- Nekropolis – production
- Julius Schittenhelm – recording, mixing

== Release history ==
Region	Date	Label	Format	Catalog
Germany	1983	Schneeball	LP	1037
Germany	1995	Ohrwaschl	CD	OW 033
