= Armorika =

Studio album by Peter Frohmader
- Released: 1991
- Recorded: Nekropolis Studio, Munich, Germany
- Genre: Electronic
- Length: 74:24
- Label: Nekropolis
- Producer: Peter Frohmader

Peter Frohmader chronology
3rd Millennium's Choice, Vol. 1 (1990)	Armorika (1991)	3rd Millennium's Choice, Vol. 2 (1991)

Professional ratings
Review scores
Source	Rating
Allmusic	2.5/5 stars

Armorika is the eighth studio album by the German electronic composer Peter Frohmader, released independently in 1991.

== Track listing ==
All music is composed by Peter Frohmader.

No.	Title	Length
1.	"Amorika"	15:30
2.	"Tumulus"	3:06
3.	"Argoat"	8:29
4.	"Les Roches du Diable"	3:23
5.	"Stivell"	6:41
6.	"Dolmen"	3:06
7.	"Menhirs"	4:44
8.	"Calvaires"	7:44
9.	"Carnac"	4:59
10.	"Armor"	10:39
11.	"Aber Wrac'h"	5:57

== Personnel ==
Adapted from the Armorika liner notes.

- Petra Fierlbeck – vocals
- Peter Frohmader – electric guitar, acoustic twelve-string guitar, Chapman Stick, sampler, synthesizer, musical arrangement
- Richard Kurländer – harp, dulcimer
- Stephan Manus – violin

== Release history ==
Region	Date	Label	Format	Catalog
Germany	1991	Nekropolis	CD	NCD 003
