= Nekropolis 2 =

Studio album by Nekropolis
- Released: 1982
- Recorded: Nekropolis Studio (Munich, DE)
- Genre: Progressive electronic, dark ambient
- Length: 44:03
- Label: Hasch Platten
- Producer: Peter Frohmader

Peter Frohmader chronology
Nekropolis 81 (1981)	Nekropolis 2 (1982)	2 Compositions (1983)

Professional ratings
Review scores
Source	Rating
Allmusic	2.5/5 stars

Nekropolis 2 is the third studio album by Nekropolis, released in 1982 by Hasch Platten.

== Track listing ==
All music is composed by Peter Frohmader.

Side one
No.	Title	Length
1.	"Neutronen-Symphonie für 8-saitigen Bass"	9:23
2.	"Innereien"	3:28
3.	"Geistertanz"	4:04
4.	"Rock Arrangement für Gitarre und 8-saitigen Bass"	5:05

Side two
No.	Title	Length
1.	"Klassiker"	4:17
2.	"Hardcorps"	3:33
3.	"Sirenenmusik"	8:46
4.	"Influenza"	5:09

2000 CD reissue bonus tracks
No.	Title	Length
9.	"[untitled]"	4:09
10.	"[untitled]"	5:06

== Personnel ==
Adapted from the Nekropolis 2 liner notes.

- Peter Frohmader – electronics, guitar, eight-string bass guitar, Rhodes piano, vibraphone, drum machine, gong, percussion, production, cover art

== Release history ==
Region	Date	Label	Format	Catalog
Germany	1982	Hasch Platten	LP	KIF 002
France	2000	Spalax	CD	SPALAXCD14573
