= Ritual (Peter Frohmader album) =

Studio album by Peter Frohmader
- Released: 1986
- Recorded: 1985
- Studio: Nekropolis Studio (Munich, DE)
- Genre: Progressive electronic, dark wave
- Length: 45:48
- Label: Multimood
- Producer: Peter Frohmader

Peter Frohmader chronology
Orakel / Tiefe (1986)	Ritual (1986)	Jules Verne Cycle (1987)

Ritual is the second studio album by Peter Frohmader, released in 1986 by Multimood.

== Track listing ==
All music is composed by Peter Frohmader

Side one
No.	Title	Length
1.	"Monolith"	5:39
2.	"Trance"	5:04
3.	"Magic"	3:50
4.	"Arrival"	5:19
5.	"Nightmare"	2:50

Side two
No.	Title	Length
1.	"Ecstasy"	11:17
2.	"Departure"	5:38
3.	"Firmament"	5:29

== Personnel ==
Adapted from the Ritual liner notes.

- Peter Frohmader – electronics, production, engineering, cover art
- Stephan Manus – violin (A1, A4)
- Stefan Plett – alto saxophone (B2, B3)

== Release history ==
Region	Date	Label	Format	Catalog
Sweden	1986	Multimood	LP	MRC 001
