= Wintermusic / Bass Symphony No. 3 =

EP by Peter Frohmader
- Released: 1987
- Recorded: 1984
- Studio: Nekropolis Studio (Munich, DE)
- Genre: Progressive electronic, dark ambient
- Length: 29:39
- Label: Multimood
- Producer: Peter Frohmader

Peter Frohmader chronology
Homunculus, Vol. 2 (1987)	Wintermusic / Bass Symphony No. 3 (1987)	Through Time and Mystery – Ending (1988)

Wintermusic / Bass Symphony No. 3 is an EP by Peter Frohmader, released in 1987 by Multimood.

== Track listing ==
All music is composed by Peter Frohmader.

Side one
No.	Title	Length
1.	"Wintermusic"	15:54

Side two
No.	Title	Length
1.	"Bass Symphony No. 3"	13:45

== Personnel ==
Adapted from the Wintermusic / Bass Symphony No. 3 liner notes.

- Peter Frohmader – choir, Chapman Stick (A-side), fretless bass guitar (B-side), six-string bass guitar (B-side), eight-string bass guitar (B-side), photography
- Birgit Metzger – vocals

== Release history ==
Region	Date	Label	Format	Catalog
Sweden	1987	Multimood	LP	MRC 006
