= Homunculus, Vol. 2 =

Album by Peter Frohmader

Studio album by Peter Frohmader
- Released: 1987
- Recorded: 1985
- Studio: Nekropolis Studio (Munich, DE)
- Genre: Progressive electronic, dark ambient
- Length: 47:48
- Label: Multimood
- Producer: Peter Frohmader

Peter Frohmader chronology
Homunculus, Vol. 1 (1987)	Homunculus, Vol. 2 (1987)	Wintermusic / Bass Symphony No. 3 (1987)

Homunculus, Vol. 2 is the fifth studio album by Peter Frohmader, released in 1987 by Multimood.

== Track listing ==
All music is composed by Peter Frohmader

Side one
No.	Title	Length
1.	"Part 3"	24:00

Side two
No.	Title	Length
1.	"Part 4"	23:48

== Personnel ==
Adapted from the Homunculus, Vol. 2 liner notes.

- Iva Bittova – violin
- Peter Frohmader – electronics, musical arrangement, production, engineering, mixing, cover art, design, photography
- Chris Karrer – violin, oud, alto saxophone
- Norbert Preisler – acoustic guitar
- Steffen Seithel – oboe

== Release history ==
Region	Date	Label	Format	Catalog
Sweden	1987	Multimood	LP	MRC 004
