= Nekropolis 81 =

Studio album by Nekropolis
- Released: 1981
- Recorded: Nekropolis Studio (Munich, DE)
- Genre: Progressive electronic, dark ambient
- Length: 108:45
- Label: Nekropolis; Vinyl On Demand (re-issue)
- Producer: Peter Frohmader

Peter Frohmader chronology
Musik aus dem Schattenreich (1979)	Nekropolis 81 (1981)	Nekropolis 2 (1982)

Nekropolis 81 is the second studio album by Nekropolis, released independently as a series of four cassette tapes in 1981. In 2013, the series was compiled and re-issued as a double LP by Vinyl On Demand, in abridged form.

== Track listing ==
All music is composed by Peter Frohmader

Side one
No.	Title	Length
1.	"[untitled]"	5:07
2.	"[untitled]"	1:06
3.	"[untitled]"	4:37
4.	"[untitled]"	3:18
5.	"[untitled]"	4:38
6.	"[untitled]"	0:29
7.	"[untitled]"	3:10

Side two
No.	Title	Length
1.	"[untitled]"	8:01
2.	"[untitled]"	14:30
3.	"[untitled]"	7:29

Side three
No.	Title	Length
1.	"[untitled]"	6:38
2.	"[untitled]"	6:12
3.	"[untitled]"	4:03
4.	"[untitled]"	2:02
5.	"[untitled]"	1:16
6.	"[untitled]"	2:09
7.	"[untitled]"	3:35

Side four
No.	Title	Length
1.	"[untitled]"	3:17
2.	"[untitled]"	1:57
3.	"[untitled]"	5:06
4.	"[untitled]"	4:10
5.	"[untitled]"	5:34
6.	"[untitled]"	1:07
7.	"[untitled]"	4:44

== Personnel ==
Adapted from the Nekropolis 2 liner notes.

- Peter Frohmader – electronics, guitar, eight-string bass guitar, Rhodes piano, vibraphone, drum machine, gong, percussion, production, cover art

== Release history ==
Region	Date	Label	Format	Catalog
Germany	1981	Nekropolis	CS	NC-1, NC-2, NC-3, NC-4
Germany	2013	Vinyl On Demand	LP	VOD118
