= Das Ist Alles =

Studio album by Frohmader/Fuchs-Gamböck
- Released: 2003
- Genre: Progressive electronic
- Label: Nekropolis

Peter Frohmader chronology
Kanaan Live 1975 (2000)	Das Ist Alles (2003)	2001 (2001)

Das Ist Alles is a collaborative album by Peter Frohmader and Michael Fuchs-Gamböck, released independently in 2000.

== Track listing ==
All music is composed by Peter Frohmader.

No.	Title	Length
1.	"Glaube"
2.	"Nachts"
3.	"Existenz"
4.	"Morgen-Blues"
5.	"Zuhause Warten"
6.	"Verzweiflung"

== Personnel ==
Adapted from the Das Ist Alles liner notes.

- Peter Frohmader – synthesizer, sampler, guitar
- Michael Fuchs-Gamböck – spoken word
- Sabine Grillenbeck – vocals (1)
- Holger Röder – drums (5)

== Release history ==
Region	Date	Label	Format	Catalog
Germany	2000	Nekropolis	CD	NCD 008
