= Cycle of Eternity =

Studio album by Peter Frohmader
- Released: 1994
- Recorded: 1991 – 1992
- Studios: Nekropolis Studio, Munich
- Genre: Electronic
- Length: 75:48
- Label: Cuneiform
- Producer: Peter Frohmader

Peter Frohmader chronology
3rd Millennium's Choice, Vol. 2 (1991)	Cycle of Eternity (1994)	Advanced Alchemy of Music (1994)

Professional ratings
Review scores
Source	Rating
Allmusic	(unrated)

Cycle of Eternity is the ninth studio album by the German electronic composer Peter Frohmader, released in 1994 by Cuneiform Records.

== Track listing ==
All music is composed by Peter Frohmader.

No.	Title	Length
1.	"Spiral"	12:06
2.	"Reflection"	6:59
3.	"Emphasis"	5:08
4.	"Hypnosis"	11:31
5.	"Spritedness"	5:02
6.	"Persistence"	8:20
7.	"Inexorability"	10:45
8.	"Elevation"	8:09
9.	"Contemplation"	7:48

== Personnel ==
Adapted from the Cycle of Eternity liner notes.

- Peter Frohmader – instruments, illustrations

== Release history ==
Region	Date	Label	Format	Catalog
United States	1994	Cuneiform	CD	Rune 59
