= Eismeer (album) =

Studio album by Peter Frohmader
- Released: March 4, 2003
- Recorded: 1996 – 1997
- Studio: Nekropolis Studio, Munich
- Genre: Progressive electronic
- Length: 65:16
- Label: Gazul

Peter Frohmader chronology
| Transfiguration (2002) | Eismeer (2003) | Anubis Dance (2003) |

Professional ratings
Review scores
| Source | Rating |
|---|---|
| Allmusic | 3/5 stars |

Eismeer is the thirteenth studio album by Peter Frohmader, released in 2003 by Gazul Records.

== Track listing ==
All music is composed by Peter Frohmader.

| No. | Title | Length |
|---|---|---|
| 1. | "Eismeer" | 37:16 |
| 2. | "Funebre" | 3:44 |
| 3. | "Orchestral Crossover" | 24:16 |

== Personnel ==
Adapted from the Eismeer liner notes.

- Peter Frohmader – instruments, cover art
- Pit Holzapfel – trombone, baritone saxophone and guitar (3)
- Jürgen Jung – spoken word (1)
- Brigitte Wagner – vocals (3)

== Release history ==
| Region | Date | Label | Format | Catalog |
|---|---|---|---|---|
| Germany | 2003 | Gazul | CD | GA 8664.AR |
