= The Forgotten Enemy (EP) =

EP by Peter Frohmader
- Released: 1985
- Genre: Progressive electronic, dark ambient
- Length: 14:53
- Label: Hasch Platten
- Producer: Peter Frohmader

Peter Frohmader chronology
Live (1983)	The Forgotten Enemy (1985)	Cultes des Goules (1985)

The Forgotten Enemy is an EP by Peter Frohmader, released in 1985 by Hasch Platten.

== Track listing ==
All music is composed by Peter Frohmader.

Side one
No.	Title	Length
1.	"Forgotten Enemy"	3:40
2.	"Abdul A."	4:18

Side two
No.	Title	Length
1.	"Jericho"	3:50
2.	"Full Moon"	3:05

== Personnel ==
Adapted from the liner notes of The Forgotten Enemy.

Musicians

- Werner Aldinger – trombone
- Peter Frohmader – electronics, cover art
- Rudi Haunreiter – drums
- Stephan Manus – violin

== Release history ==
Region	Date	Label	Format	Catalog
Germany	1985	Hasch Platten	LP	KIF 008
