= Musik aus dem Schattenreich =

Studio album by Nekropolis
- Released: 1979
- Recorded: 1978
- Genre: Progressive electronic, dark ambient
- Length: 39:56
- Label: Nekropolis

Peter Frohmader chronology
Musik aus dem Schattenreich (1979)	Nekropolis 81 (1981)

Professional ratings
Review scores
Source	Rating
Allmusic	4/5 stars

Musik aus dem Schattenreich is the debut studio album of Nekropolis, released in 1979 by Nekropolis.

== Track listing ==
All music is composed by Peter Frohmader

Side one
No.	Title	Length
1.	"Hölle im Angesicht"	3:49
2.	"Fegefeuer"	3:34
3.	"Unendliche Qual"	3:36
4.	"Krypta"	8:54

Side two
No.	Title	Length
1.	"Mitternachtsmesse II"	6:46
2.	"Inquanok"	4:30
3.	"Ghul"	4:35
4.	"Pagan"	5:15

1998 CD reissue bonus tracks
No.	Title	Length
9.	"Mitternachtsmesse I"	9:08
10.	"Höllenfahrt"	5:44
11.	"Krypta II"	1:55
12.	"Bass-Präludium"	2:07

== Personnel ==
Adapted from the Musik aus dem Schattenreich liner notes.

- Peter Frohmader – electronics, electric guitar, electric bass guitar, double bass, fretless bass guitar
- Rudi Neuber – drums

== Release history ==
Region	Date	Label	Format	Catalog
Germany	1979	self-released	CS	
Germany	1981	Nekropolis	LP	RP-10122
Germany	1998	Ohrwaschl	CD	OW 042
Germany	2012	Pure Pop for Now People	LP	PURE 09
