= Space Icon =

Studio album by Artemiy Artemiev & Peter Frohmader
- Released: March 2000
- Recorded: August 1999 – January 2000
- Studio: Art Recording Studio, Moscow; Nekropolis Studio, Munich
- Genre: Ambient
- Length: 58:36
- Label: Electroshock
- Producer: Artemiy Artemiev, Vladimir Krupnitskiy

Artemiy Artemiev chronology
Forgotten Themes (2000)	Space Icon (2000)	Transfiguration (2002)

Peter Frohmader chronology
Fossil Culture (1999)	Space Icon (2000)	Kanaan Live 1975 (2000)

Professional ratings
Review scores
Source	Rating
Allmusic	4/5 stars

Space Icon is a collaborative album by Artemiy Artemiev and Peter Frohmader, released in March 2000 by Electroshock Records.

== Track listing ==
All music is composed by Artemiy Artemiev and Peter Frohmader

No.	Title	Length
1.	"Space Icon"	19:10
2.	"Mir"	7:02
3.	"Chenneling"	4:53
4.	"Zen Garden"	4:08
5.	"Cosmic Jungle"	23:23

== Personnel ==
Adapted from the Space Icon liner notes.

Musicians

- Artemiy Artemiev – synthesizer, musical arrangements, production, recording, engineering, mixing
- Peter Frohmader – fretless bass guitar, electric guitar, E-mu Emulator, PPG Wave synthesizer, gongs, musical arrangements, recording, engineering, mixing

Production and additional personnel

- Konstantin Galat – design
- Vladimir Krupnitskiy – production
- Boris Samoilov – mastering

== Release history ==
Region	Date	Label	Format	Catalog
Russia	2000	Electroshock	CD	ELCD 015
