= Through Time and Mystery – Ending =

Studio album by Peter Frohmader
- Released: 1988
- Recorded: 1987
- Studio: Nekropolis Studio (Munich, DE)
- Genre: Electronic
- Length: 88:04
- Label: Nekropolis
- Producer: Peter Frohmader

Peter Frohmader chronology
Wintermusic / Bass Symphony No. 3 (1987)	Through Time and Mystery – Ending (1988)	Spheres (1988)

Through Time and Mystery – Ending is the sixth album by the German electronic composer Peter Frohmader, released independently in 1988.

== Track listing ==
All music is composed by Peter Frohmader

Side one
No.	Title	Length
1.	"Medusa" (Part I)	22:45

Side two
No.	Title	Length
1.	"Medusa" (Part II)	21:49

Side three
No.	Title	Length
1.	"Plague Dances"	22:40

Side four
No.	Title	Length
1.	"Malleus Maleficarum"	20:50

== Personnel ==
Adapted from the Through Time and Mystery – Ending liner notes.

- Peter Frohmader – electronics, production, engineering, mixing, illustrations, cover art
- Hellmut Neukirch – painting

== Release history ==
Region	Date	Label	Format	Catalog
Germany	1988	Nekropolis	LP	220 174
