= Transfiguration (Artemiy Artemiev & Peter Frohmader album) =

Studio album by Artemiy Artemiev & Peter Frohmader
- Released: 2002
- Genre: Ambient
- Length: 56:10
- Label: Electroshock
- Producer: Artemiy Artemiev

Artemiy Artemiev chronology
Space Icon (2000)	Transfiguration (2002)	A Moment of Infinity (2002)

Peter Frohmader chronology
2001 (2001)	Transfiguration (2002)	Eismeer (2003)

Professional ratings
Review scores
Source	Rating
Allmusic	2/5 stars

Transfiguration is a collaborative album by Artemiy Artemiev and Peter Frohmader, released in 2002 by Electroshock Records.

== Track listing ==
All music is composed by Artemiy Artemiev and Peter Frohmader.

No.	Title	Length
1.	"Transfiguration" (Part I)	7:08
2.	"Transfiguration" (Part II)	5:35
3.	"Transfiguration" (Part III)	8:14
4.	"Transfiguration" (Part IV)	5:33
5.	"Transfiguration" (Part V)	29:40

== Personnel ==
Adapted from the Transfiguration liner notes.

Musicians

- Artemiy Artemiev – keyboards, sampler, programming, musical arrangements, production, recording, engineering, mixing
- Peter Frohmader – bass guitar, electric guitar, keyboards, gongs, musical arrangements, recording, engineering, mixing

Production and additional personnel

- Konstantin Galat – cover art
- Boris Samoilov – mastering

== Release history ==
Region	Date	Label	Format	Catalog
Russia	2002	Electroshock	CD	ELCD 021
