= Artemiy Artemiev =

Soviet and Russian composer

- Born: Artemiy Eduardovich Artemiev; 13 January 1966 (age 60)
- Origin: Moscow, Russia
- Genres: Electronic music
- Occupation: Musician
- Years active: 1988–present
- Label: Electroshock

Artemiy Eduardovich Artemiev (Russian: Арте́мий Эдуа́рдович Арте́мьев; born 13 January 1966) is a Russian composer of electronic and experimental music.

== Career ==
Since 1988, he has composed music for more than fifty Russian feature films, and has contributed to several documentary films and television programs. He is the son of renowned composer Edward Artemiev, who is most recognized for his collaborations with film director Andrei Tarkovsky.

== Discography ==
- The Warning (1993)
- Cold (1994)
- Point of Intersection (1997)
- Five Mystery Tales of Asia (1998)
- Mysticism of Sound (1999)
- Forgotten Themes (2000)
- Space Icon (2000)
- Transfiguration (2002)
- Equilibrium (with Karda Estra) (2002)
- Time, Desert and a Sound (2004)
