= Macrocosm (album) =

Studio album by Peter Frohmader
- Released: 1990
- Recorded: 1988 – 1989
- Studio: Nekropolis Studio, Munich
- Genre: Progressive electronic
- Length: 66:20
- Label: Cuneiform
- Producer: Peter Frohmader

Peter Frohmader chronology
| Miniatures (1989) | Macrocosm (1990) | 3rd Millennium's Choice, Vol. 1 (1990) |

Professional ratings
Review scores
| Source | Rating |
|---|---|
| Allmusic | 3/5 stars |

Macrocosm is the seventh studio album by the German electronic composer Peter Frohmader, released in 1990 by Cuneiform Records.

== Track listing ==
All music is composed by Peter Frohmader

| No. | Title | Length |
|---|---|---|
| 1. | "Macrocosm" | 22:50 |
| 2. | "Breath" | 26:06 |
| 3. | "Archetype" | 10:20 |
| 4. | "Ascension" | 7:04 |

== Personnel ==
Adapted from the Macrocosm liner notes.

- Peter Frohmader – instruments, cover art
- Paula Millet – design
- Roger Seibel – mastering

== Release history ==
| Region | Date | Label | Format | Catalog |
|---|---|---|---|---|
| United States | 1990 | Cuneiform | CD | Rune 23 CD |
