= Microcosm =

Microcosm or macrocosm, also spelled mikrokosmos or makrokosmos, may refer to:

== Philosophy ==
- Microcosm–macrocosm analogy, the view according to which there is a structural similarity between the human being and the cosmos

== Music ==
- Macrocosm (album), seventh studio album by the German electronic composer Peter Frohmader, released in 1990
- Makrokosmos, a series of four volumes of pieces for piano by American composer George Crumb
- "Mic-rocosm", a song by American rapper Prodigy from the album Hegelian Dialectic
- Microcosm (album), 2010 album by Flow
- Microcosmos (Drudkh album)
- Microcosmos (Thy Catafalque album)
- Mikrokosmos (Bartók), a cycle of piano pieces written 1926-1939 by Hungarian composer Béla Bartók
- Mikrokosmos (Turovsky), four cycles of lute pieces, Mikrokosmos I-IV, by Ukrainian-American composer Roman Turovsky
- Mikrokosmos, pseudonym used by former Dark Star frontman Christian Hayes for solo material
- Mikrokosmos, a 1987 performance choreographed by Anne Teresa De Keersmaeker
- "Mikrokosmos", by BTS from the 2019 album Map of the Soul: Persona

== Biology ==
- Microcosm (experimental ecosystem), a small scale contained and controlled ecosystem
- Microcosmus, a genus of tunicates

== Literature and publishing ==
- Microcosm Publishing, an independent publisher and distributor based in Portland, Oregon, and Bloomington, Indiana, U.S.
- Microcosm: E. coli and the New Science of Life, a 2008 book by Carl Zimmer
- Microcosm: Portrait of a Central European City, a 2002 book by Norman Davies and Roger Moorhouse
- Microcosm: The Quantum Revolution In Economics And Technology by George Gilder

== Other uses ==
- Macrocosm (Star Trek: Voyager), 54th episode of Star Trek: Voyager
- Microcosm (CERN), a museum near Geneva, Switzerland
- Microcosm (clock), a unique clock made by Henry Bridges of Waltham Abbey, England
- Microcosm (hypermedia system), an early hypermedia system that predated the World Wide Web
- Microcosm (video game), a 1993 shoot-'em-up by Psygnosis
- Microcosm Ltd, a UK software protection company
- Microcosmos (film), a 1996 documentary film
- The Microcosm, a 19th-century microscope gallery and shop on Regent Street, London, run by Carpenter and Westley

== See also ==
- Microcosmic God, science fiction novelette published in 1941 by American writer Theodore Sturgeon
- Microcosmic orbit, a Taoist Qigong energy cultivation technique
- Microcosmic salt, a salt found in urine with the formula Na(NH_{4})HPO_{4}
- Microcosmographia Academica, a short pamphlet on university politics written by F. M. Cornford and published in 1908
- The Ray of the Microcosm, romanticist poem written in 1845 by Prince-Bishop and Petar II Petrović-Njegoš
