= Peter Frohmader =

German electronic composer (1958–2022)

- Born: 9 May 1958; Munich, Bavaria, West Germany
- Died: 2 May 2022 (aged 63)
- Genre: Electronic music
- Occupations: Musician, Painter
- Years active: 1971–2022
- Labels: Nekropolis; Cuneiform
- Website: Official Site

Peter Frohmader (9 May 1958 – 2 May 2022) was a German electronic composer, musician and visual artist. He was also known by the pseudonym Nekropolis, a name under which he released several early works. Taking cues from Carl Orff, Magma, Glenn Branca, and Black Sabbath, Frohmader was recognized for his nightmarish and gothic compositions.

== Biography ==
Peter Frohmader was born on 9 May 1958 in Munich, Germany, and began listening to electronic music such as Tangerine Dream and Ash Ra Tempel when he was twelve years old. He quickly began composing music of his own and started several bands such as Alpha Centauri, an avant-garde band; Electronic Delusion, a Tangerine Dream-inspired electronic band; and Kanaan, which was an electronic music outfit with jazz rock leanings.

In 1979 he formed a rock band, CIA, and began working as Nekropolis on more experimental projects. Some of his music was performed on industrial and domestic tools, as well as on self-made instruments and electronic media. His influence was noted by bands such as The Sisters of Mercy, Throbbing Gristle, and Deine Lakaien, and he became better known in Japan, the U.S. and Britain than in Germany. His music was "characterized by a fondness for the nightmarish and the fantastic".

He died on 2 May 2022, at the age of 63.
