= 1978 Oakland Athletics season =

1978 Oakland Athletics
- League: American League
- Division: West
- Ballpark: Oakland-Alameda County Coliseum
- City: Oakland, California
- Record: 69–93 (.426)
- Divisional place: 6th
- Owners: Charles O. Finley
- Managers: Bobby Winkles, Jack McKeon
- Television: KPIX-TV (Monte Moore, Bob Waller)
- Radio: KALX/KNEW (AM) (Larry Baer & Bob Kozberg/Bud Foster, Bob Cosgrove, Curt Flood & Jim Peterson)

The 1978 Oakland Athletics season was the team's eleventh in Oakland, California. The team sought to rebound from its first losing season in a decade (a 63–98 result in 1977). Despite low expectations, the Athletics remained competitive for nearly three-quarters of the season. Despite posting a respectable 61–56 mark through 117 games, the Athletics collapsed in the season's final weeks; their 8–37 finish ensured a second consecutive season of fewer than 70 wins.

Only one player (Billy North) remained from the team's 1974 championship season. He would be traded to the Dodgers in May.

Prior to the season, owner Charlie Finley nearly sold the team to buyers who would have moved them to Denver.

== Offseason ==
- February 25, 1978: Doug Bair and cash were traded by the Athletics to the Cincinnati Reds for Dave Revering.
- March 15, 1978: Vida Blue was traded by the Athletics to the San Francisco Giants for Gary Alexander, Gary Thomasson, Dave Heaverlo, Alan Wirth, John Henry Johnson, Phil Huffman, a player to be named later, and $300,000. The Giants completed the deal by sending Mario Guerrero to the Athletics on April 7.
- March 25, 1978: Sheldon Mallory was traded by the Athletics to the Toronto Blue Jays for Steve Staggs.
- March 28, 1978: Dick Allen was released by the Athletics.
- March 28, 1978: Mark Williams was released by the Athletics.

=== Vida Blue trade ===
The trade of Vida Blue was a very complicated deal for A's owner Charles O. Finley. At the end of the 1977 season, Finley attempted to trade Vida Blue to the Cincinnati Reds for a player of lesser stature and cash, but baseball commissioner Bowie Kuhn vetoed the deal. The commissioner claimed that it was tantamount to the sale of the star pitcher to the Yankees that the commissioner voided during 1976. The commissioner claimed that adding Blue to the Reds' already formidable pitching staff would make a mockery of the National League West race. Instead, Blue was traded across the bay to the San Francisco Giants in a multi-player trade that received the commissioner's blessing.

=== Proposed sale ===
After the 1977 season, Charlie Finley had heart bypass surgery and his health was in decline. He had received offers from groups in New Orleans and Washington, D.C., and from billionaire oilman Marvin Davis from Denver. In December 1977, Finley agreed to sell the Athletics to Marvin Davis for 12.5 million dollars. The franchise would move to Denver for the 1978 season. The American League owners approved the sale and the transfer of the franchise. The board of the Oakland Coliseum had prepared a lawsuit against Finley, as there were still 10 years left on their stadium lease. Bowie Kuhn and San Francisco Giants owner Bob Lurie worked with Finley to attempt to find a compromise that would allow the Athletics to leave Oakland.

== Regular season ==
=== Season standings ===
AL West
Team	W	L	Pct.	GB	Home	Road
Kansas City Royals	92	70	.568	—	56‍–‍25	36‍–‍45
Texas Rangers	87	75	.537	5	52‍–‍30	35‍–‍45
California Angels	87	75	.537	5	50‍–‍31	37‍–‍44
Minnesota Twins	73	89	.451	19	38‍–‍43	35‍–‍46
Chicago White Sox	71	90	.441	20½	38‍–‍42	33‍–‍48
Oakland Athletics	69	93	.426	23	38‍–‍42	31‍–‍51
Seattle Mariners	56	104	.350	35	32‍–‍49	24‍–‍55

=== Record vs. opponents ===
1978 American League record Sources:
Team	BAL	BOS	CAL	CWS	CLE	DET	KC	MIL	MIN	NYY	OAK	SEA	TEX	TOR
Baltimore	—	7–8	4–6	8–1	9–6	7–8	2–8	7–8	5–5	6–9	11–0	9–1	7–4	8–7
Boston	8–7	—	9–2	7–3	7–8	12–3	4–6	10–5	9–2	7–9	5–5	7–3	3–7	11–4
California	6–4	2–9	—	8–7	6–4	4–7	9–6	5–5	12–3	5–5	9–6	9–6	5–10	7–3
Chicago	1–8	3–7	7–8	—	8–2	2–9	8–7	4–7	8–7	1–9	7–8	7–8	11–4	4–6
Cleveland	6–9	8–7	4–6	2–8	—	5–10	5–6	5–10	5–5	6–9	4–6	8–1	1–9	10–4
Detroit	8–7	3–12	7–4	9–2	10–5	—	4–6	7–8	4–6	4–11	6–4	8–2	7–3	9–6
Kansas City	8–2	6–4	6–9	7–8	6–5	6–4	—	6–4	7–8	6–5	10–5	12–3	7–8	5–5
Milwaukee	8–7	5–10	5–5	7–4	10–5	8–7	4–6	—	4–7	10–5	9–1	5–5	6–4	12–3
Minnesota	5–5	2–9	3–12	7–8	5–5	6–4	8–7	7–4	—	3–7	9–6	6–9	6–9	6–4
New York	9–6	9–7	5–5	9–1	9–6	11–4	5–6	5–10	7–3	—	8–2	6–5	6–4	11–4
Oakland	0–11	5–5	6–9	8–7	6–4	4–6	5–10	1–9	6–9	2–8	—	13–2	6–9	7–4
Seattle	1–9	3–7	6–9	8–7	1–8	2–8	3–12	5–5	9–6	5–6	2–13	—	3–12	8–2
Texas	4–7	7–3	10–5	4–11	9–1	3–7	8–7	4–6	9–6	4–6	9–6	12–3	—	4–7
Toronto	7–8	4–11	3–7	6–4	4–10	6–9	5–5	3–12	4–6	4–11	4–7	2–8	7–4	—

=== Notable transactions ===
- April 4, 1978: Manny Sanguillén was traded by the Athletics to the Pittsburgh Pirates for Miguel Diloné, Elías Sosa and a player to be named later. The Pirates completed the deal by sending Mike Edwards to the Athletics on April 7.
- May 22, 1978: Joe Coleman was purchased from the Athletics by the Toronto Blue Jays.
- June 15, 1978: Gary Alexander was traded by the Athletics to the Cleveland Indians for Joe Wallis.
- June 15, 1978: Gary Thomasson was traded by the Athletics to the New York Yankees for Mickey Klutts, Dell Alston and $50,000.
- June 20, 1978: Tito Fuentes was signed as a free agent by the Athletics.
- July 13, 1978: Willie Horton was signed as a free agent by the Athletics.
- July 26, 1978: Tito Fuentes was released by the Athletics.
- August 15, 1978: Willie Horton and Phil Huffman were traded by the Athletics to the Toronto Blue Jays for Rico Carty.

==== Draft picks ====
- June 6, 1978: 1978 Major League Baseball draft
  - Keith Atherton was drafted by the Athletics in the 2nd round.
- June 6, 1978: Kelvin Moore was drafted by the Athletics in the 6th round.

=== Roster ===
1978 Oakland Athletics
Roster
Pitchers: 40 Pete Broberg; 15 Joe Coleman; 37 Tim Conroy; 60 Dave Heaverlo; 38 John Henry Johnson; 27 Matt Keough; 34 Bob Lacey; 22 Rick Langford; 54 Steve McCatty; 23,49 Craig Minetto; 15 Mike Morgan; 16,17 Mike Norris; 28 Steve Renko; 33 Elías Sosa; 38 Alan Wirth	Catchers: 18 Jim Essian; 25 Tim Hosley; 26 Scott Meyer; 5 Jeff Newman; 25,48 Bruce Robinson; Infielders: 9,21 Mike Adams; 16 Taylor Duncan; 7 Mike Edwards; 26,44 Tito Fuentes; 10 Wayne Gross; 3 Mario Guerrero; 17 Marty Perez; 8 Rob Picciolo; 24 Dave Revering; 31 Steve Staggs; 14 Jerry Tabb; 25,44 Darrell Woodard	Outfielders: 37 Gary Alexander; 13,32 Dell Alston; 11 Tony Armas; 17 Mark Budaska; 4,14 Glenn Burke; 19 Miguel Diloné; 11 Willie Horton; 36 Dwayne Murphy; 20 Larry Murray; 4 Billy North; 6 Mitchell Page; 12 Gary Thomasson; 9 Joe Wallis; Other batters: 20,23 Rico Carty	Manager: 1 Jack McKeon; 1 Bobby Winkles; Coaches: 43 Bobby Hofman; 42 Jack McKeon; 2 Red Schoendienst; 41 Lee Stange

== Player stats ==
=== Batting ===
==== Starters by position ====
Note: Pos = Position; G = Games played; AB = At bats; H = Hits; Avg. = Batting average; HR = Home runs; RBI = Runs batted in

Pos	Player	G	AB	H	Avg.	HR	RBI
C	Jim Essian	126	278	62	.223	3	26
1B	Dave Revering	152	521	141	.271	16	46
2B	Mike Edwards	142	414	113	.273	1	23
SS	Mario Guerrero	143	505	139	.275	3	38
3B	Wayne Gross	118	285	57	.200	7	23
LF	Mitchell Page	147	516	147	.285	17	70
CF	Joe Wallis	85	279	66	.237	6	26
RF	Gary Thomasson	47	154	31	.201	5	16
DH	Gary Alexander	58	174	36	.207	10	22

==== Other batters ====
Note: G = Games played; AB = At bats; H = Hits; Avg. = Batting average; HR = Home runs; RBI = Runs batted in

Player	G	AB	H	Avg.	HR	RBI
Taylor Duncan	104	319	82	.257	2	37
Jeff Newman	105	268	64	.239	9	32
Miguel Diloné	135	258	59	.229	1	14
Tony Armas	91	239	51	.213	2	13
Glenn Burke	78	200	47	.235	1	14
Dell Alston	58	173	36	.208	1	10
Rico Carty	41	141	39	.277	11	31
Willie Horton	32	102	32	.314	3	19
Rob Picciolo	79	93	21	.226	2	7
Bruce Robinson	28	84	21	.250	0	8
Steve Staggs	47	78	19	.244	0	0
Billy North	24	52	11	.212	0	5
Dwayne Murphy	60	52	10	.192	0	5
Tito Fuentes	13	43	6	.140	0	2
Tim Hosley	13	23	7	.304	0	3
Mike Adams	15	15	3	.200	0	1
Larry Murray	11	12	1	.083	0	0
Marty Perez	16	12	0	.000	0	0
Jerry Tabb	12	9	1	.111	0	1
Darrell Woodard	33	9	0	.000	0	0
Scott Meyer	8	9	1	.111	0	0
Mark Budaska	4	4	1	.250	0	0

=== Pitching ===
==== Starting pitchers ====
Note: G = Games pitched; IP = Innings pitched; W = Wins; L = Losses; ERA = Earned run average; SO = Strikeouts

Player	G	IP	W	L	ERA	SO
Matt Keough	32	197.1	8	15	3.24	108
John Henry Johnson	33	186.0	11	10	3.39	91
Pete Broberg	35	165.2	10	12	4.62	94
Steve Renko	27	151.0	6	12	4.29	89
Alan Wirth	16	81.2	5	6	3.43	31
Mike Morgan	3	12.1	0	3	7.30	0
Tim Conroy	2	4.2	0	0	7.71	0

==== Other pitchers ====
Note: G = Games pitched; IP = Innings pitched; W = Wins; L = Losses; ERA = Earned run average; SO = Strikeouts

Player	G	IP	W	L	ERA	SO
Rick Langford	37	175.2	7	13	3.43	92
Mike Norris	14	49.0	0	5	5.51	36
Craig Minetto	4	12.0	0	0	3.75	3

==== Relief pitchers ====
Note: G = Games pitched; W = Wins; L = Losses; SV = Saves; ERA = Earned run average; SO = Strikeouts

Player	G	IP	W	L	SV	ERA	SO
Elías Sosa	68	109.0	8	2	14	2.64	61
Dave Heaverlo	69	130.0	3	6	10	3.25	71
Bob Lacey	74	119.2	8	9	5	3.01	60
Joe Coleman	10	19.2	3	0	0	1.37	4
Steve McCatty	9	20.0	0	0	0	4.50	10

== Farm system ==
Level	Team	League	Manager
AAA	Vancouver Canadians	Pacific Coast League	Jim Marshall
AA	Jersey City A's	Eastern League	John Kennedy
A	Modesto A's	California League	Gaylen Pitts
A-Short Season	Bend Timber Hawks	Northwest League	Ed Nottle
