= 1979 Oakland Athletics season =

1979 Oakland Athletics
- League: American League
- Division: West
- Ballpark: Oakland-Alameda County Coliseum
- City: Oakland, California
- Record: 54–108 (.333)
- Divisional place: 7th
- Owners: Charles O. Finley
- Managers: Jim Marshall
- Television: KPIX-TV (Monte Moore, Bob Waller)
- Radio: KKIS (Hal Ramey, Red Rush)

The 1979 Oakland Athletics season was the 79th season for the Oakland Athletics franchise, all as members of the American League, and their 12th season in Oakland. The Athletics finished seventh in the American League West Division with a record of 54 wins and 108 losses. Only 306,763 paying customers (an average of 3,984 for 77 home dates; there were four doubleheaders) showed up to watch the A's in 1979, the team's worst attendance since leaving Philadelphia.

Team owner Charlie Finley nearly sold the team to buyers who would have moved them to New Orleans for 1979. Any deal to relocate fell through when the city of Oakland refused to release the A's from their lease. The city was in the midst of its battle with the Oakland Raiders over their move to Los Angeles and didn't want to lose both teams.

The Athletics' 54–108 finish was their worst since moving to Oakland in 1968 until it was surpassed in 2023, in which they finished 50–112 (.309). On a brighter note, the season saw the debut of Rickey Henderson. Henderson, a future Hall-of-Famer, would play for the team in four separate stints between 1979 and 1998.

== Offseason ==
- October 3, 1978: Rico Carty was purchased from the Athletics by the Toronto Blue Jays.
- January 9, 1979: Lemmie Miller was drafted by the Athletics in the 1st round (6th pick) of the 1979 Major League Baseball draft, but did not sign.
- February 26, 1979: Darryl Cias was purchased by the Athletics from the Salem Senators.
- February 28, 1979: Jim Todd was signed as a free agent by the Athletics.

== Regular season ==
On April 17, 1979, the A's had their smallest home crowd (and one of the smallest in a major league baseball game in the 20th century) when only 653 people came to the nearly 50,000 seat Oakland–Alameda County Coliseum to see them beat the Seattle Mariners, 6 to 5.

On June 24, Rickey Henderson made his major league debut against the Texas Rangers. In four at bats, Henderson had two hits and a stolen base.

=== Season standings ===
AL West
| Team | W | L | Pct. | GB | Home | Road |
|---|---|---|---|---|---|---|
| California Angels | 88 | 74 | .543 | — | 49‍–‍32 | 39‍–‍42 |
| Kansas City Royals | 85 | 77 | .525 | 3 | 46‍–‍35 | 39‍–‍42 |
| Texas Rangers | 83 | 79 | .512 | 5 | 44‍–‍37 | 39‍–‍42 |
| Minnesota Twins | 82 | 80 | .506 | 6 | 39‍–‍42 | 43‍–‍38 |
| Chicago White Sox | 73 | 87 | .456 | 14 | 33‍–‍46 | 40‍–‍41 |
| Seattle Mariners | 67 | 95 | .414 | 21 | 36‍–‍45 | 31‍–‍50 |
| Oakland Athletics | 54 | 108 | .333 | 34 | 31‍–‍50 | 23‍–‍58 |

=== Record vs. opponents ===
1979 American League record Sources:
| Team | BAL | BOS | CAL | CWS | CLE | DET | KC | MIL | MIN | NYY | OAK | SEA | TEX | TOR |
|---|---|---|---|---|---|---|---|---|---|---|---|---|---|---|
| Baltimore | — | 8–5 | 9–3 | 8–3 | 8–5 | 7–6 | 6–6 | 8–5 | 8–4 | 5–6 | 8–4 | 10–2 | 6–6 | 11–2 |
| Boston | 5–8 | — | 5–7 | 5–6 | 6–7 | 8–5 | 8–4 | 8–4 | 9–3 | 5–8 | 9–3 | 8–4 | 6–6 | 9–4 |
| California | 3–9 | 7–5 | — | 9–4 | 6–6 | 4–8 | 7–6 | 7–5 | 9–4 | 7–5 | 10–3 | 7–6 | 5–8 | 7–5 |
| Chicago | 3–8 | 6–5 | 4–9 | — | 6–6 | 3–9 | 5–8 | 5–7 | 5–8 | 4–8 | 9–4 | 5–8 | 11–2 | 7–5 |
| Cleveland | 5–8 | 7–6 | 6–6 | 6–6 | — | 6–6 | 6–6 | 4–9 | 8–4 | 5–8 | 8–4 | 7–5 | 5–7 | 8–5 |
| Detroit | 6–7 | 5–8 | 8–4 | 9–3 | 6–6 | — | 5–7 | 6–7 | 4–8 | 7–6 | 7–5 | 7–5 | 6–6 | 9–4 |
| Kansas City | 6–6 | 4–8 | 6–7 | 8–5 | 6–6 | 7–5 | — | 5–7 | 7–6 | 5–7 | 9–4 | 7–6 | 6–7 | 9–3 |
| Milwaukee | 5–8 | 4–8 | 5–7 | 7–5 | 9–4 | 7–6 | 7–5 | — | 8–4 | 9–4 | 6–6 | 9–3 | 9–3 | 10–3 |
| Minnesota | 4–8 | 3–9 | 4–9 | 8–5 | 4–8 | 8–4 | 6–7 | 4–8 | — | 7–5 | 9–4 | 10–3 | 4–9 | 11–1 |
| New York | 6–5 | 8–5 | 5–7 | 8–4 | 8–5 | 6–7 | 7–5 | 4–9 | 5–7 | — | 9–3 | 6–6 | 8–4 | 9–4 |
| Oakland | 4–8 | 3–9 | 3–10 | 4–9 | 4–8 | 5–7 | 4–9 | 6–6 | 4–9 | 3–9 | — | 8–5 | 2–11 | 4–8 |
| Seattle | 2–10 | 4–8 | 6–7 | 8–5 | 5–7 | 5–7 | 6–7 | 3–9 | 3–10 | 6–6 | 5–8 | — | 6–7 | 8–4 |
| Texas | 6–6 | 6–6 | 8–5 | 2–11 | 7–5 | 6–6 | 7–6 | 3–9 | 9–4 | 4–8 | 11–2 | 7–6 | — | 7–5 |
| Toronto | 2–11 | 4–9 | 5–7 | 5–7 | 5–8 | 4–9 | 3–9 | 3–10 | 1–11 | 4–9 | 8–4 | 4–8 | 5–7 | — |

=== Notable transactions ===
- June 5, 1979: Ronn Reynolds was drafted by the Athletics in the 5th round of the 1979 Major League Baseball draft, but did not sign.
- June 15, 1979: Mark Souza was signed as a free agent by the Athletics.

=== Roster ===
1979 Oakland Athletics
Roster
| Pitchers: 33 Dave Hamilton; 60 Dave Heaverlo; 38 John Henry Johnson; 27 Matt Keough; 50 Brian Kingman; 34 Bob Lacey; 22 Rick Langford; 54 Steve McCatty; 32 Craig Minetto; 15 Mike Morgan; 17 Mike Norris; 28 Jim Todd; 30 Alan Wirth | Catchers: 18 Jim Essian; 5 Jeff Newman; Infielders: 16 Dave Chalk; 7 Mike Edwards; 10 Wayne Gross; 3 Mario Guerrero; 12 Mickey Klutts; 8 Rob Picciolo; 31 Milt Ramírez; 24 Dave Revering | Outfielders: 11 Tony Armas; 23 Derek Bryant; 14 Glenn Burke; 19 Miguel Diloné; 48 Mike Heath; 35 Rickey Henderson; 21 Dwayne Murphy; 20 Larry Murray; 6 Mitchell Page; 9,43 Joe Wallis | Manager: 25 Jim Marshall; Coaches: 44 George Mitterwald (Bullpen); 42 Jim Saul (Third Base); 41 Lee Stange (Pitching); 43 Lee Walls (First Base) |

== Player stats ==
=== Batting ===
==== Starters by position ====
Note: Pos = Position; G = Games played; AB = At bats; H = Hits; Avg. = Batting average; HR = Home runs; RBI = Runs batted in

| Pos. | Player | G | AB | H | Avg. | HR | RBI |
|---|---|---|---|---|---|---|---|
| C | Jeff Newman | 143 | 516 | 119 | .231 | 22 | 71 |
| 1B | Dave Revering | 125 | 472 | 136 | .288 | 19 | 77 |
| 2B | Mike Edwards | 122 | 400 | 93 | .233 | 1 | 23 |
| SS | Rob Picciolo | 115 | 348 | 88 | .253 | 2 | 27 |
| 3B | Wayne Gross | 138 | 442 | 99 | .224 | 14 | 50 |
| LF | Rickey Henderson | 89 | 351 | 96 | .274 | 1 | 26 |
| CF | Dwayne Murphy | 121 | 388 | 99 | .255 | 11 | 40 |
| RF | Tony Armas | 80 | 278 | 69 | .248 | 11 | 34 |
| DH | Mitchell Page | 133 | 478 | 118 | .247 | 9 | 42 |

==== Other batters ====
Note: G = Games played; AB = At bats; H = Hits; Avg. = Batting average; HR = Home runs; RBI = Runs batted in

| Player | G | AB | H | Avg. | HR | RBI |
|---|---|---|---|---|---|---|
| Jim Essian | 98 | 313 | 76 | .243 | 8 | 40 |
| Mike Heath | 74 | 258 | 66 | .256 | 3 | 27 |
| Larry Murray | 105 | 226 | 42 | .186 | 2 | 20 |
| Dave Chalk | 66 | 212 | 47 | .222 | 2 | 13 |
| Mario Guerrero | 46 | 166 | 38 | .229 | 0 | 18 |
| Derek Bryant | 39 | 106 | 19 | .179 | 0 | 13 |
| Miguel Diloné | 30 | 91 | 17 | .187 | 1 | 6 |
| Glenn Burke | 23 | 89 | 19 | .213 | 0 | 4 |
| Joe Wallis | 23 | 78 | 11 | .141 | 1 | 3 |
| Mickey Klutts | 24 | 73 | 14 | .192 | 1 | 4 |
| Milt Ramírez | 28 | 62 | 10 | .161 | 0 | 3 |

=== Pitching ===
==== Starting pitchers ====
Note: G = Games pitched; IP = Innings pitched; W = Wins; L = Losses; ERA = Earned run average; SO = Strikeouts

| Player | G | IP | W | L | ERA | SO |
|---|---|---|---|---|---|---|
| Rick Langford | 34 | 218.2 | 12 | 16 | 4.28 | 101 |
| Steve McCatty | 31 | 185.2 | 11 | 12 | 4.22 | 87 |
| Matt Keough | 30 | 176.2 | 2 | 17 | 5.04 | 95 |
| Brian Kingman | 18 | 112.2 | 8 | 7 | 4.31 | 58 |
| John Henry Johnson | 14 | 84.2 | 2 | 8 | 4.36 | 50 |
| Mike Morgan | 13 | 77.1 | 2 | 10 | 5.94 | 17 |

==== Other pitchers ====
Note: G = Games pitched; IP = Innings pitched; W = Wins; L = Losses; ERA = Earned run average; SO = Strikeouts

| Player | G | IP | W | L | ERA | SO |
|---|---|---|---|---|---|---|
| Mike Norris | 29 | 146.1 | 5 | 8 | 4.80 | 96 |
| Craig Minetto | 36 | 118.1 | 1 | 5 | 5.55 | 64 |
| Dave Hamilton | 40 | 82.2 | 3 | 4 | 3.70 | 52 |
| Alan Wirth | 5 | 12.0 | 1 | 0 | 6.00 | 7 |

==== Relief pitchers ====
Note: G = Games pitched; W = Wins; L = Losses; SV = Saves; ERA = Earned run average; SO = Strikeouts

| Player | G | W | L | SV | ERA | SO |
|---|---|---|---|---|---|---|
| Dave Heaverlo | 62 | 4 | 11 | 9 | 4.20 | 40 |
| Jim Todd | 51 | 2 | 5 | 2 | 6.56 | 26 |
| Bob Lacey | 42 | 1 | 5 | 4 | 5.85 | 33 |

== Farm system ==
| Level | Team | League | Manager |
|---|---|---|---|
| AAA | Ogden A's | Pacific Coast League | José Pagán |
| AA | Waterbury A's | Eastern League | Ed Nottle |
| A | Modesto A's | California League | Gaylen Pitts |
| A-Short Season | Medford A's | Northwest League | Rich Morales |
