= Hyperart Thomasson =

Useless structure now preserved as art

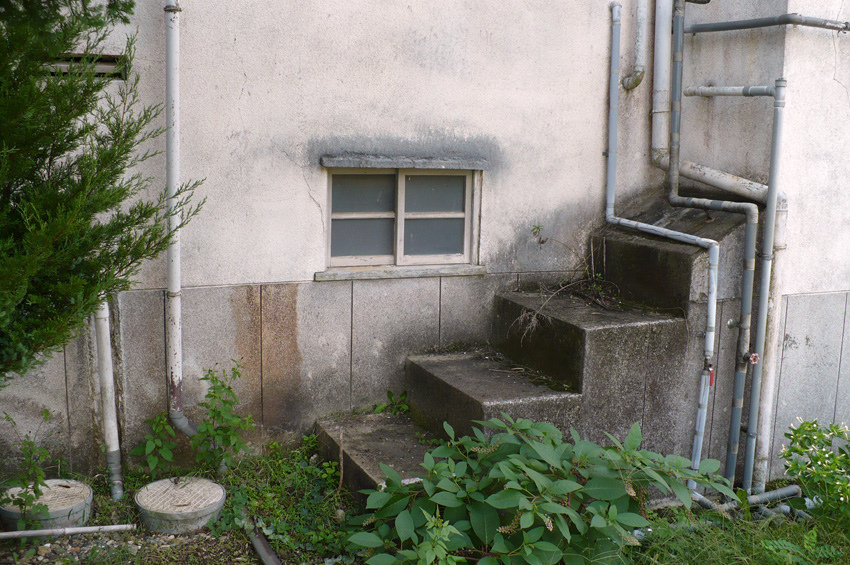
Example of a "useless staircase" or "pure staircase" Thomasson

Thomasson or Hyperart Thomasson (Japanese: Tomason トマソン or Chōgeijutsu Tomason 超芸術トマソン) is a type of conceptual art named by the Japanese artist Akasegawa Genpei in the 1980s. It refers to a useless relic or structure that has been preserved as part of a building or the built environment, which has become a piece of art in itself. These objects, although having the appearance of pieces of conceptual art, were not created to be viewed as such. Akasegawa deemed them even more art-like than art itself, and named them "hyperart". In recent years there has been a resurgence of interest in Thomasson, especially since the publication of Akasegawa's work on the subject in English in 2010.

== Etymology ==
The term Thomasson comes from the professional baseball player Gary Thomasson, who was signed by the Yomiuri Giants for a record-breaking sum of money, and spent his final two seasons with the team (1981–1982) failing to score any hits for the team, coming close to setting the league strikeout record before being benched. Akasegawa viewed Thomasson's useless position on the team as a fitting analogy for "an object, part of a building, that was maintained in good condition, but with no purpose, to the point of becoming a work of art".

In Japanese there is no differentiation between singular and plural versions of the noun Tomason, therefore in English too, Thomasson can refer to one or many of these objects. In English, the term is sometimes spelled Tomason, or Thomason.

== History ==
Akasegawa discovered the first Thomasson in 1972, in Yotsuya, Tokyo when he noticed a staircase that had no entranceway when one reached the top. The handrail of the staircase, however, showed signs of repair, suggesting it was still being maintained despite the apparent uselessness of the staircase itself. The following year, Akasegawa discovered a boarded up ticket window at Ekoda station on the Seibu Ikebukuro Line. The plywood used to board up the window had been cut neatly to fit the curved stone tray of the ticket window, where it had been worn through years of use. Minami Shindō, a fellow artist and friend of Akasegawa also found a gateway at a hospital in Ochanomizu that had been completely filled up with concrete, whilst the gateway itself was still in good condition.

The artists gave these objects names such as "The pure staircase of Yotsuya", "The useless window of Ekoda" and "The useless gate of Ochanomizu" and referred to them collectively as "hyperart": their similar characteristics being "an object which, just like a piece of art, has no purpose in society, but also, just like a piece of art is preserved with care, to the point where it appears to be on display. However, these objects do not appear to have a creator, making them even more art-like than regular art." Hyperart cannot be created by an artist, but only found and recognized as such by an observer.

Those pieces of hyperart that were part of buildings or the built environment were given the name "Thomasson". The name was decided upon during a discussion between Akasegawa and his students during his class on "Modernology" (a concept created by Wajiro Kon). At that time, Gary Thomasson's strikeout record was at 132.

The concept of Thomasson was introduced to the general public in 1982, via a series of articles in the magazine Shashin Jidai (Photo Times), published by Byakuya-Shobō. The articles featured findings by Akasegawa's students from his "Modernology" class as well as photographs of those "objects" catalogued by Akasegawa himself, and those sent in by readers. The articles created a "Thomasson Boom" and the concept soon spread. The early Thomasson articles featured in Shashin Jidai were published by Byakuya-Shobō as a book entitled Chōgeijutsu Tomason. The complete series of articles was later published as a paperback by Chikuma Shobō in 1987, using the same title.

== Influence ==
The Thomasson boom after the publication of articles in Shashin Jidai had a big effect on students and young people interested in arts and the avant-garde. The word Thomasson even spread to people who did not understand what it referred to, in a kind of social phenomenon. The cover of Chōgeijutsu Tomason featured a lost neighborhood of Minato-ku in Tokyo, Tani-cho, which vanished due to land redevelopment. Whilst not directly related to Thomasson, the story of Tani embodied its spirit. Its use on the cover of the book had a large effect on the "Thomasson Boom". This case also showed the effects of the bubble economy on the city landscape. As historian Jordan Sand notes, cataloguing Thomasson was "a way of regaining some sense of the human imprint on the city in an era when that imprint was being rapidly erased."

In 1983 the Thomasson Observation Center held an exhibition entitled "Cityscape in Anguish" at Gallery 612 in Shinjuku, displaying Akasegawa's paintings and photographs of Thomasson by Akasegawa, his students, and those sent in by readers of the magazine. Various tie-in events such as Thomasson bus tours, lectures by Akasegawa, as well as coverage on the Japanese national broadcaster NHK, and the publication, in 1987 of the complete "Chōgeijutsu Tomason", were the peak of the Thomasson Boom.

Around the same time, other artists and intellectuals were pursuing similar projects. Terunobu Fujimori's work on Architecture Detectives, Hayashi Jōji's work cataloguing manhole covers, Minami Shinbo's collections of paper stickers, Ichigi Tsutomu's work on architectural fragments and other such collections, led to Chikuma Shobō publishing a book entitled Rojō kansatsugaku nyūmon ("Manual on Street Observation") in 1986. Alongside this, a Street Observation Society event was held to promote their work, along with a press conference.

Although Street Observation did appear to be something of a boom, it was not the same type of movement that had surrounded the activities of Akasegawa, his students, and their magazine articles. After the arrival of the Street Observation Society, Thomasson disappeared from the public eye for a while, due in part to the fact that the Thomasson Observation Center, run by Akasegawa and his students, overwhelmed by press and public attention, stopped its activities soon after the boom reached its peak.

In the years immediately after the Thomasson boom, the concept was referenced in cinema and literature. In the film Patlabor: The Movie (1989) a scene featured the "Atom-bomb type" Thomasson. William Gibson's 1993 novel Virtual Light also makes multiple references to Thomasson.

== Rediscovery ==
In 2010 the Chikuma Shobō edition of Chōgeijutsu Tomason was translated into English by Matt Fargo and published as Hyperart:Thomasson. In 2012, the Thomasson Observation Center created a Facebook page, and started accepting posts on Thomasson via the internet. The posts were shared widely, and a special form was made available for download to fill out with details of newly discovered Thomasson. A new, internet-era Thomasson movement began. The book and concept have been covered by several English-language media outlets.

In 2013, the Thomasson Observation Center held a Grand Thomasson Exhibition at a gallery in Shinjuku, Tokyo to celebrate the 31st anniversary of its founding.

Historian of modern Japan Jordan Sand's 2013 work, Tokyo Vernacular: Common Spaces, Local Histories, Found Objects, also discusses the Thomasson phenomenon in its third chapter, entitled "Deviant Properties: Street Observation Studies". Sand also contributed an essay to the 2010 translation of Hyperart: Thomasson.

In 2013 "La Poussière de soleils", an exhibition in Brooklyn gallery Real Fine Arts, featured Thomasson in the form of a photocopy of Akasegawa's photograph of a door handle sticking out of a cement wall.

== Types of Thomasson ==
Based on the categories in Chikuma Shobō's "Thomasson Illustrated Encyclopedia" (Tomason Daizukan トマソン大図鑑)

=== The useless staircase ===
(Japanese: Muyō kaidan 無用階段)

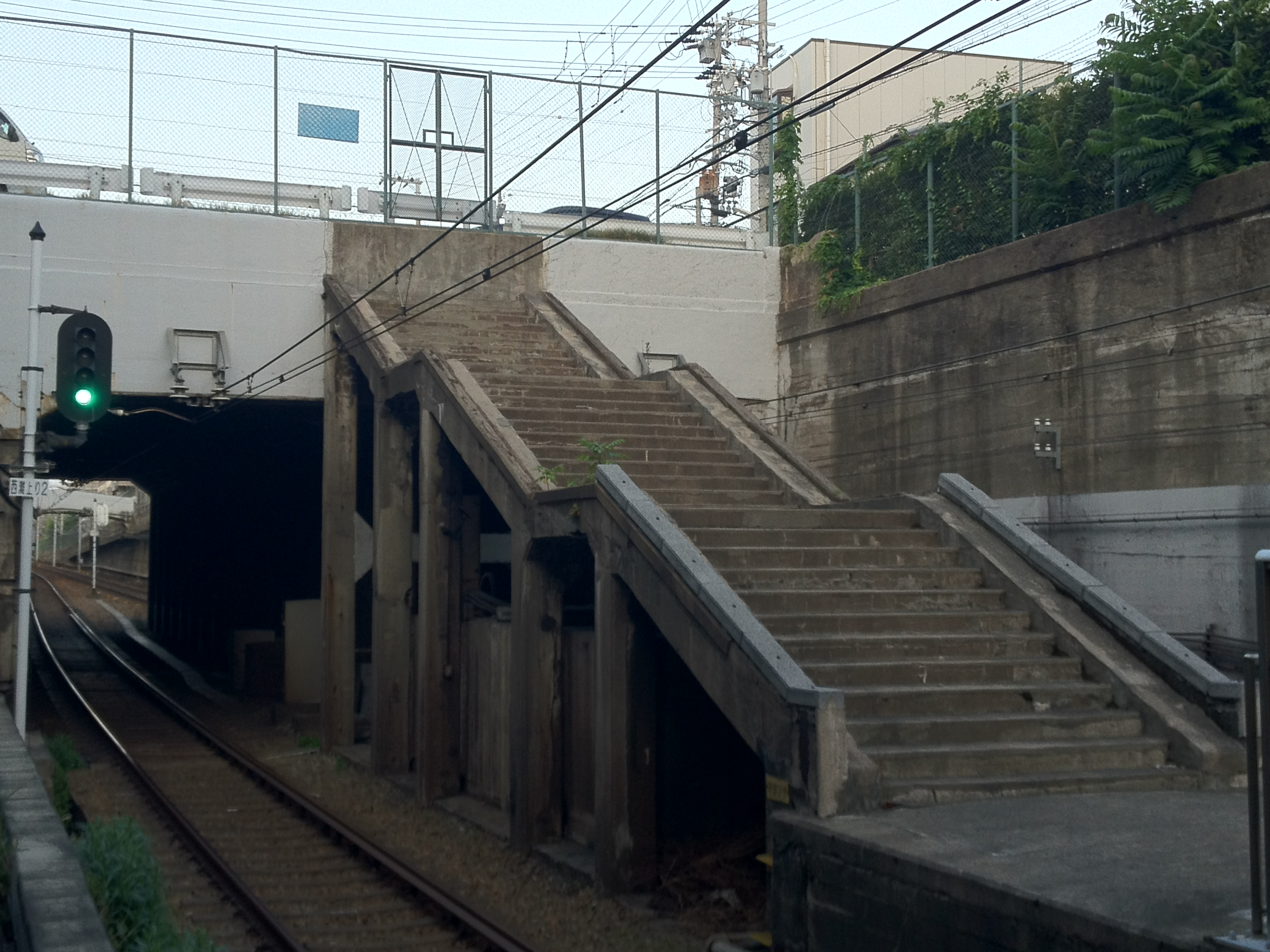
Example of a useless staircase

Also known as a pure staircase. A staircase that only goes up and down. Most used to have a door at the top. Some useless staircases exist that were useless right from completion, due to changes or mix-ups in the design.

=== The useless doorway ===
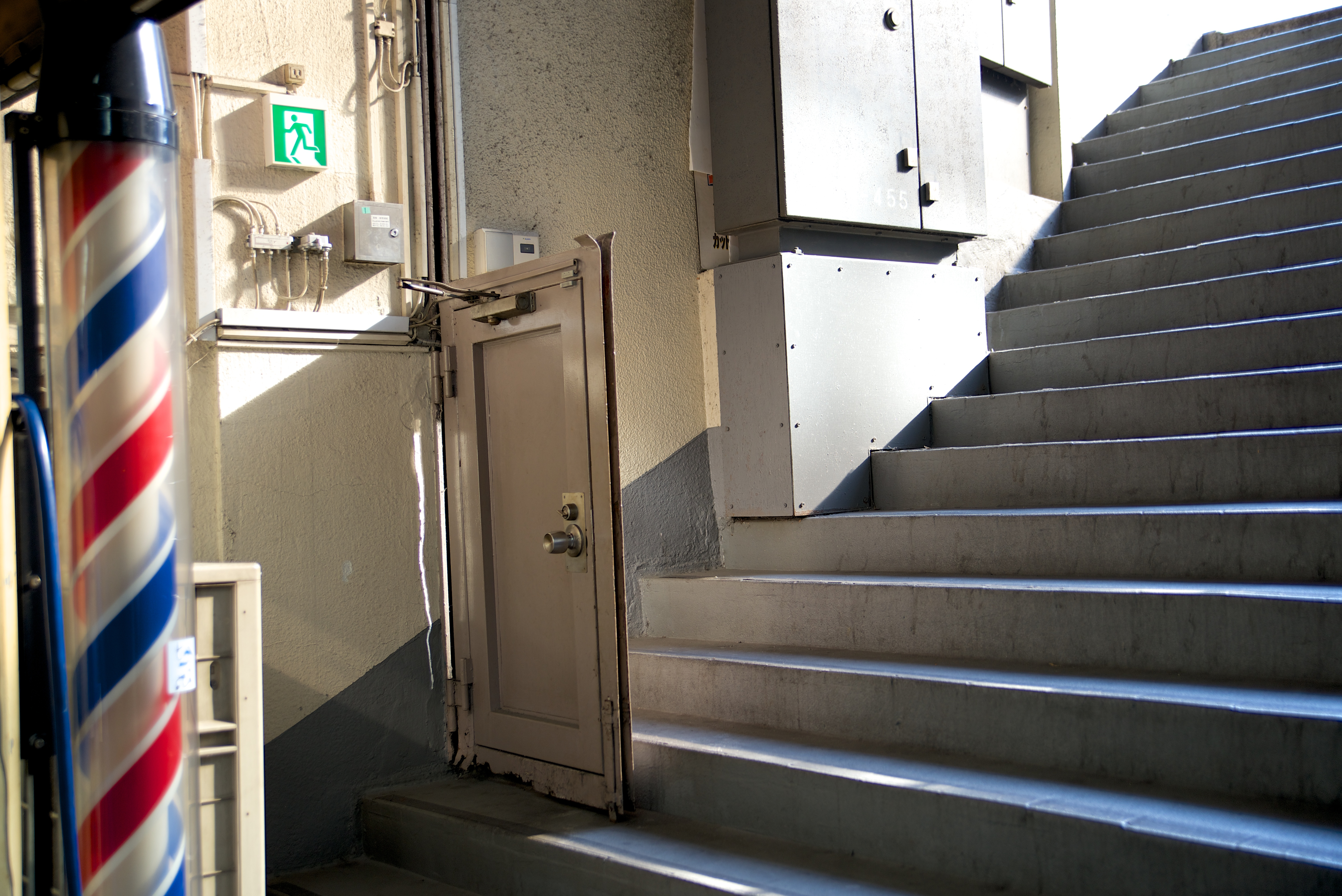
Example of a useless doorway

(Japanese: Muyō mon 無用門)

Even though it has been blocked up, a useless doorway still maintains the majesty of its original purpose. In other cases, a useless doorway exists in a place that has no need for it, with no wall or fence around it.

=== The hisashi ===
(Japanese: Hisashi ヒサシ)

Hisashi is the word for "eaves" in Japanese. This refers to useless eaves: ones that no longer have a window or door underneath them to protect from the rain.

=== The useless window ===
(Japanese: Muyō mado, 無用窓)

A blocked up window: one which is still in good condition due to the care taken in blocking it up.

=== The Nurikabe ===
(Japanese: Nurikabe ヌリカベ)

Nurikabe is the word for "plaster wall" in Japanese. This overlaps with the Useless Doorway and Useless Window categories. It refers to a door or window that was meant to be completely sealed up with concrete, but a difference can still be seen between it and the surrounding area.

=== The A-bomb type ===
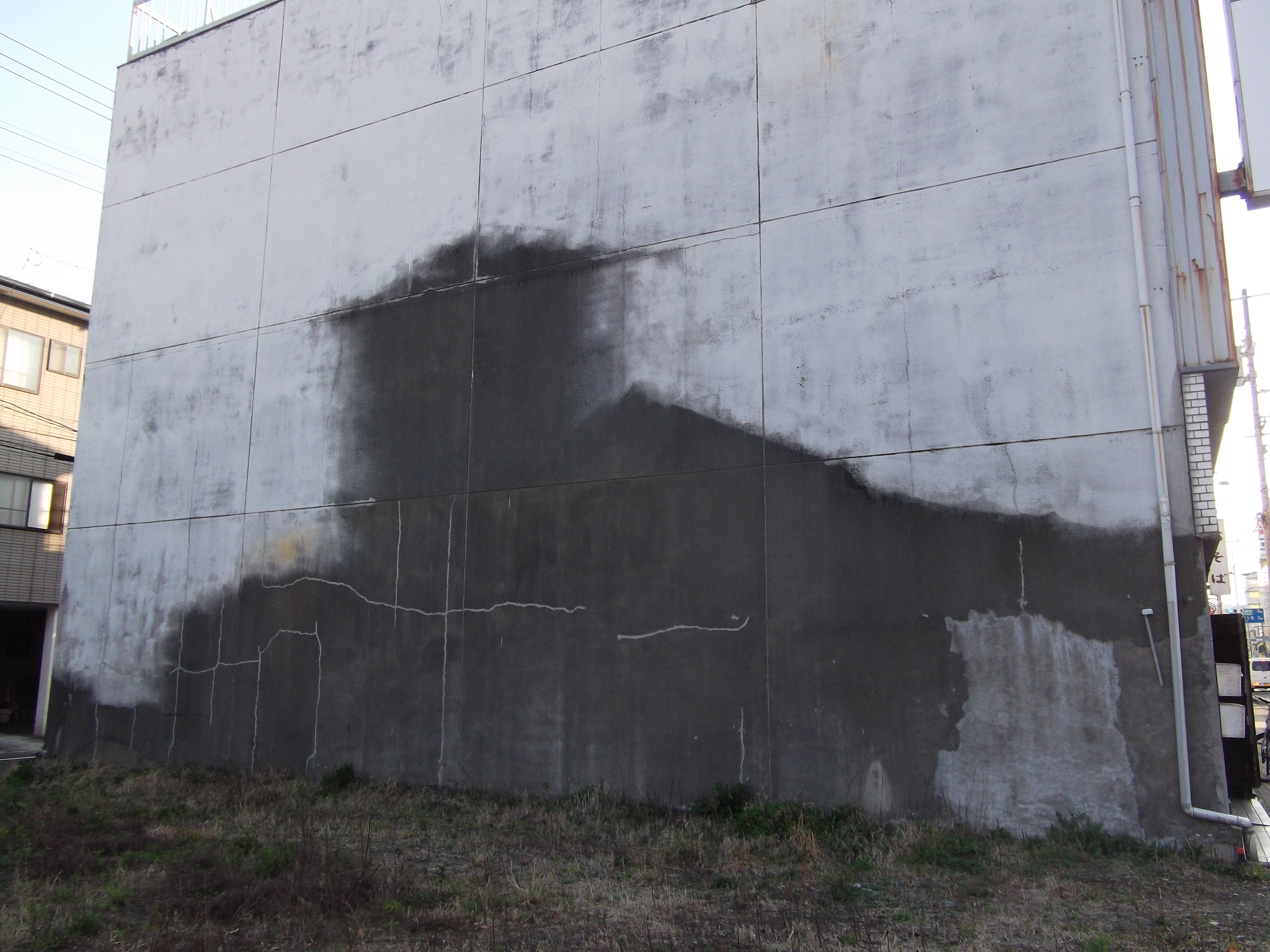
Example of an A-bomb type Thomasson

(Japanese: Genbaku taipu 原爆タイプ)

A 2-D Thomasson. The outline of a building that remains in silhouette on a wall. This can be seen when a section of a tightly packed row of buildings is torn down. Cases that appear due to water are known as hydrogen bombs (suibaku 水爆). Cases that appear when a hoarding or sign is torn down are known as neutron bombs (chūseishibakudan 中性子爆弾).

=== The elevated type ===
(Japanese: Kōsho 高所)

These objects are normal themselves, but exist in a higher than normal place, therefore seeming strange. For example, a door with a handle on the second floor of a wall. These often appear when staircases are torn down. They can also appear when a winch or crane is kept inside the building, but a standard door is used on the outside.

=== The outie ===
(Japanese: Debeso でべそ)

A protrusion from a sealed up wall, such as a door knob or tap.

=== The uyama ===
(Japanese: Uyama ウヤマ)

A sign or hoarding with letters missing. The first example of this was a shop sign which contained the words Uyama, but the rest of the lettering was missing, hence the name.

=== The castella ===
(Japanese: Kasutera カステラ)

A cuboid protuberance from a wall, named after castella, a Japanese sponge cake. For example, a blocked up window which sticks out from the wall. The opposite of this, a sunken blocked up section, is known as a reverse castella.

=== The Atago ===
(Japanese: Atago アタゴ)

An object sticking out at the side of the road, with no clear purpose, possibly used to stop cars parking. The first example of this was found by Akasegawa whilst walking from Shinbashi to Atago, hence the name.

=== The live burial ===
(Japanese: Ikiume 生き埋め)

A roadside object which is partly submerged in concrete.

=== The geological layer ===
(Japanese: Chisō 地層)

A patch of ground that is different in height from that around it, usually where multiple construction works have taken place.

=== The boundary ===
(Japanese: Kyōkai 境界)

A guardrail, fence or wall whose purpose is not immediately clear.

=== The twist ===
(Japanese: Nejire ねじれ)

A part of a building which is normally meant to be straight, but is slightly twisted. Often seen when an object that was created to be used straight is used at an angle.

=== The Abe Sada ===
(Japanese: Abe Sada 阿部定)

The remains of a telephone pole cut down. The name refers to the Abe Sada Incident; a famous case from 1930s Japan in which a woman strangled her lover and then severed his genitalia with a kitchen knife.

=== The devouring tree ===
(Japanese: Monokūki もの喰う木)

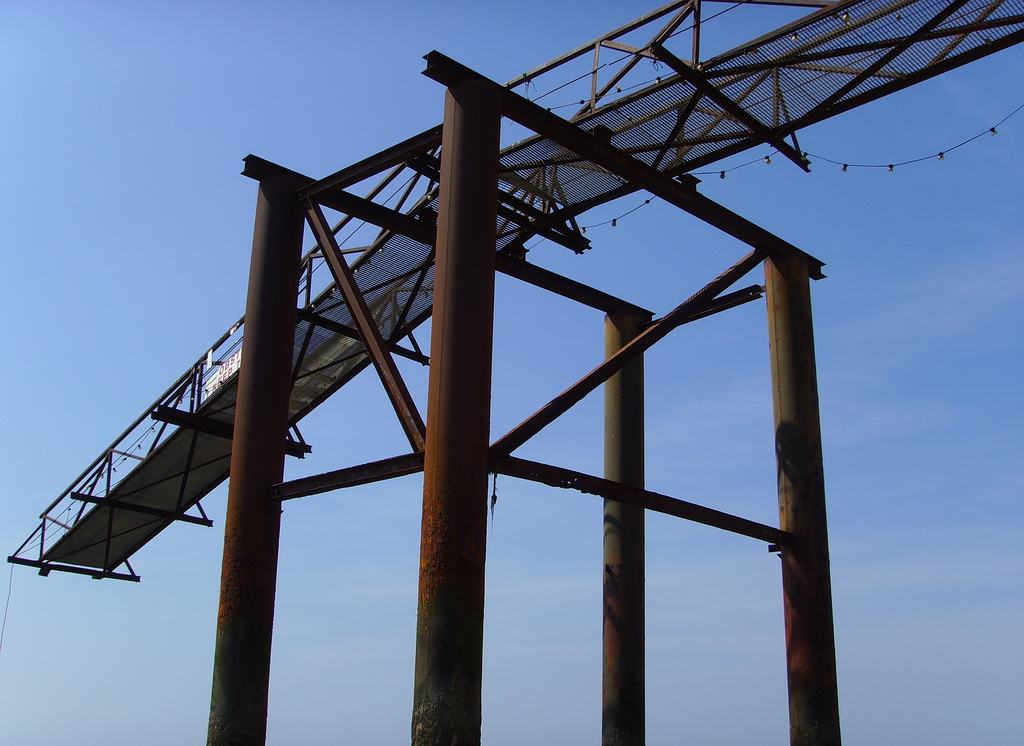
Example of a bridge to nowhere in Brighton, UK, which formerly connected to a pier

A tree which absorbs part of a fence or wire whilst still growing. However, this is not a particularly rare phenomenon, and occurs quite often. If there is no human involvement then it cannot be called a Thomasson, just a natural phenomenon. This is also known as the stubborn nature type (shizen kohashi taipu 自然強しタイプ).

=== The useless bridge ===
(Japanese: Muyō bashi 無用橋)

A bridge over a filled-in river, or a bridge that has become useless. In the case of some covered drains, a bridge is still necessary for cars or heavy vehicles to cross. In this case these could not be called useless bridges, as they only appear useless.

=== The pure type ===
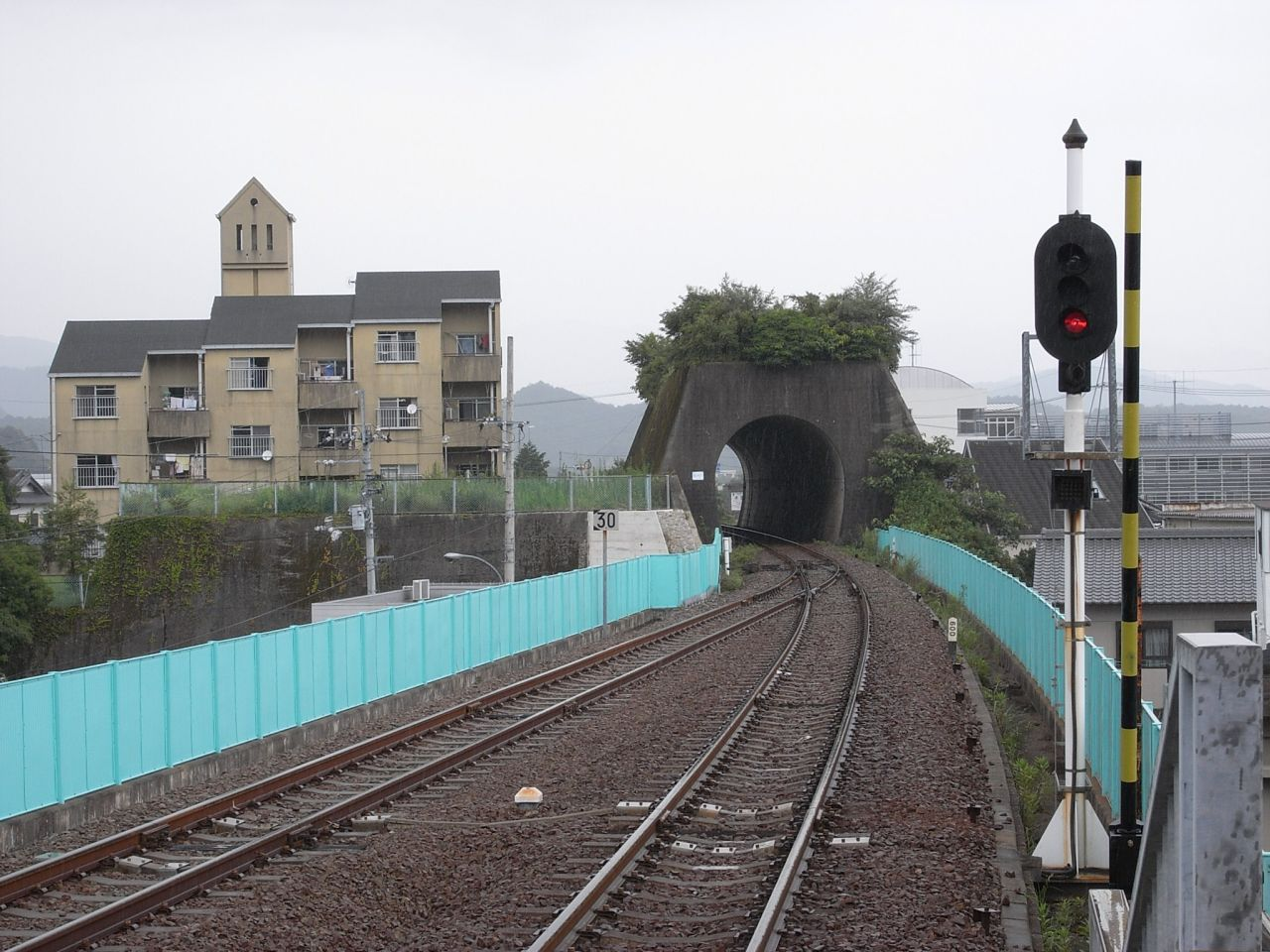
Example of a "pure tunnel" in Tokushima Prefecture, Japan.

(Japanese: Junsui taipu 純粋タイプ)

An uncategorizable object whose use it is impossible to fathom. For example, the pure shutters, which open to reveal a blank wall, and the pure tunnel that exists without a surrounding hill. The pure staircase of Yotsuya belongs in this category.

=== Evaporation ===
(Japanese: Jōhatsu 蒸発)

The fading of color on a sign, or a monument with parts missing: an object whose meaning has become hard to work out. Cases often appear due to the long-lasting material of the object. This also often occurs when a sign's key phrases, painted in red for emphasis, disappear, leaving the rest of the sign hard to understand.

== See also ==
- Bridge to nowhere
- Boondoggle

== Bibliography ==
- Akasegawa Genpei, Minami Shinbō, Fujimori Terunobu (eds.) Rojō kansatsugaku nyūmon, Chikuma Shobō, 1986
- Akasegawa Genpei, Chōgeijutsu Tomason, Chikuma Shobō, 1987
- Munroe, Alexandra (ed.) Japanese art after 1945: Scream Against the Sky, Harry N. Abrams/Yokohama Museum of Art, 1994
- Akasegawa Genpei, Tomason daizukan: mu no maki, Chikuma Shobō, 1996
- Akasegawa Genpei Tomason daizukan: kū no maki, Chikuma Shobō, 1996
- Prakash, Gyan and Kruse, Kevin Michael (eds.) The Spaces of the Modern City: Imaginaries, Politics, and Everyday Life, Princeton University Press, 2008
- Akasegawa Genpei, Hyperart: Thomasson, translated by Matt Fargo, Kaya Press, 2010
- Daniell, Thomas "Just Looking: The Origins of the Street Observation Society”. AA Files, no. 64, Architectural Association School of Architecture, 2012: 59–68
- Sand, Jordan Tokyo Vernacular: Common Spaces, Local Histories, Found Objects, University of California Press, 2013
