= Dell Alston =

American baseball player (born 1952)

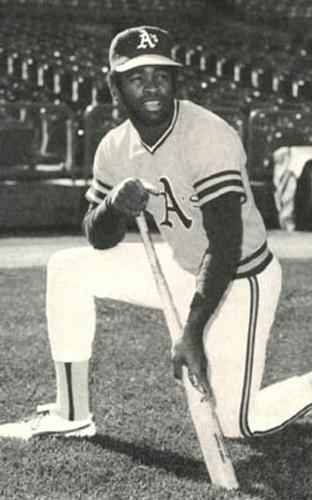
- Outfielder
- Born: September 22, 1952 (age 72); Valhalla, New York, U.S.
- Batted: Left Threw: Right

MLB debut
- May 17, 1977, for the New York Yankees

Last MLB appearance
- October 4, 1980, for the Cleveland Indians

MLB statistics
- Batting average: .238
- Home runs: 3
- Runs batted in: 35
- Stats at Baseball Reference

Teams
- New York Yankees (1977–1978); Oakland Athletics (1978); Cleveland Indians (1979–1980)

Wendell Alston (born September 22, 1952) is an American former professional baseball outfielder. He played in Major League Baseball (MLB) for the New York Yankees, Oakland Athletics, and Cleveland Indians. He attended Concordia College, where he participated in college baseball.

== Career ==
On August 21, 1972, Alston was signed by the New York Yankees as an amateur free agent.

Alston made his major league debut on May 17, 1977, with the Yankees at age 24. Alston recorded a hit in his only at bat in his debut. That year, Alston had a batting average of .325 in 40 at bats. After three at bats in the 1978 Major League Baseball season, Alston was traded with Mickey Klutts and $50,000 to the Oakland Athletics for Gary Thomasson. In Oakland, Alston recorded a .208 batting average in 173 at bats, bringing his season batting average to .205. After the 1978 season, Alston was released by the Athletics. On April 5, 1979, Alston was signed as a free agent with the Cleveland Indians. In 1979, Alston had a .290 batting average in 62 at bats. In 1980, he recorded a .222 batting average in 54 at bats. Alston never played in the major leagues again. In 1981, he was released by the Cleveland Indians, officially ending his Major League career.

At the time of his retirement, Alston had a career batting average of .238. He finished with 332 at bats in 189 games. He drove in 35 runs during his career. Alston hit three home runs over the course of his career. His lifetime fielding percentage was .962.
