= Larry Murray (baseball) =

American baseball player (born 1953)

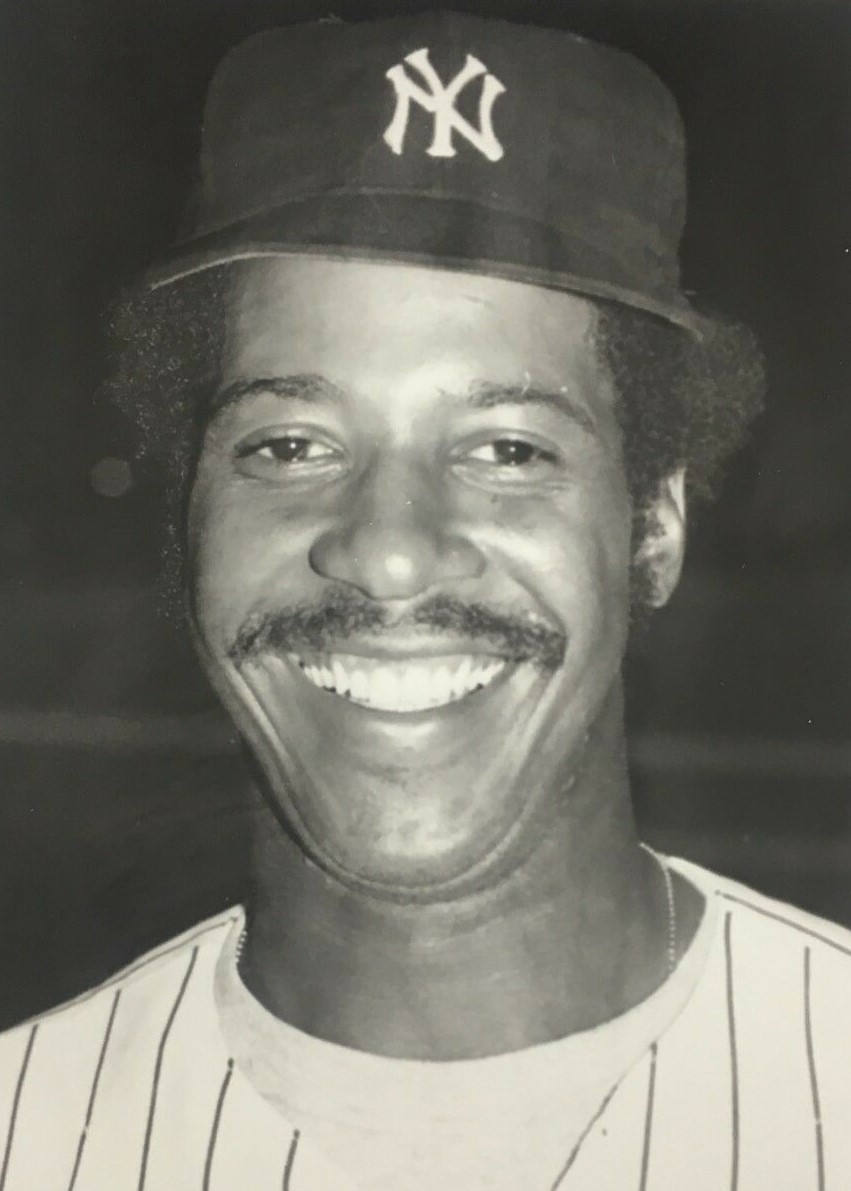
- Outfielder
- Born: April 1, 1953 (age 73); Chicago, Illinois, U.S.
- Batted: Switch Threw: Right

MLB debut
- September 7, 1974, for the New York Yankees

Last MLB appearance
- September 23, 1979, for the Oakland Athletics

MLB statistics
- Batting average: .177
- Home runs: 3
- Runs batted in: 31
- Stats at Baseball Reference

Teams
- New York Yankees (1974–1976); Oakland Athletics (1977–1979)

Larry Murray (born April 1, 1953) is an American former professional baseball outfielder. He played all or part of six seasons in Major League Baseball (MLB) for the New York Yankees and Oakland Athletics.

== Yankees ==
Murray was drafted by the Yankees out of high school in the 3rd round of the 1971 Major League Baseball draft. He made his major league debut in 1974, and played a handful of games in the majors in the next two seasons as well.

== A's ==
Murray's big break came during the early part of the 1977 season. With Charlie Finley's dismantling of the team in full swing, the A's shipped Mike Torrez to the Yankees in exchange for Dock Ellis, Marty Perez, and Murray. While Ellis was fairly quickly shipped off himself to the Texas Rangers, Murray was given a chance to establish himself with Oakland. In 90 games, however, Murray batted just .179, with just 9 RBI in 179 at bats. He did steal 12 bases.

After spending most of 1978 back in the minor leagues, Murray got another chance in 1979, but fared little better, batting a paltry .186. Even his speed seemed to desert him, as he stole just 6 bases in 12 tries, and he was soon benched in favor of Tony Armas. That would be the end of Murray's major league career.

Murray played one more season of professional baseball with the Ogden A's in 1980, then retired.

== Sources ==
- Career statistics from Baseball Reference · Baseball Reference (Minors) · Retrosheet · Baseball Almanac, or Retrosheet
