= Rico Carty =

Dominican baseball player (1939–2024)

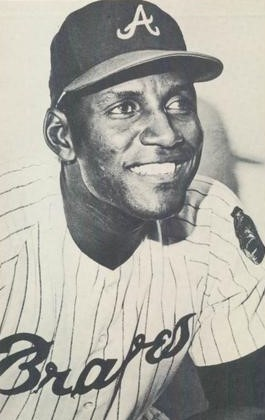
- Left fielder
- Born: September 1, 1939; San Pedro de Macorís, Dominican Republic
- Died: November 23, 2024 (aged 85); Atlanta, Georgia, U.S.
- Batted: Right Threw: Right

MLB debut
- September 15, 1963, for the Milwaukee Braves

Last MLB appearance
- September 23, 1979, for the Toronto Blue Jays

MLB statistics
- Batting average: .299
- Home runs: 204
- Runs batted in: 890
- Stats at Baseball Reference

Teams
- Milwaukee / Atlanta Braves (1963–1967, 1969–1970, 1972); Texas Rangers (1973); Chicago Cubs (1973); Oakland Athletics (1973); Cleveland Indians (1974–1977); Toronto Blue Jays (1978); Oakland Athletics (1978); Toronto Blue Jays (1979)

Career highlights and awards
- All-Star (1970); NL batting champion (1970); Braves Hall of Fame

Ricardo Adolfo Jacobo Carty (September 1, 1939 – November 23, 2024) was a Dominican professional baseball player. He played in Major League Baseball (MLB) as an outfielder from 1963 to 1979, most prominently as a member of the Atlanta Braves where he helped the franchise win its first National League (NL) Western Division title in 1969. Carty was the 1970 National League batting champion and, became the first write-in candidate in MLB history to be elected as an All-Star starter in the 1970 All-Star Game. He also played for the Chicago Cubs, Oakland Athletics, Cleveland Indians, Toronto Blue Jays and Texas Rangers.

Carty was one of the earliest Dominicans to play in the major leagues, giving himself the nickname "Beeg Boy". He maintained a .300 career batting average until a sub par final season dropped his average to .299. Despite being one of the best hitters of his era, his defiant, confrontational personality earned him a reputation as a troublemaker. Carty's career was marked by battles with injuries, illnesses (tuberculosis) and teammates. In 1996, Carty was inducted into the Caribbean Baseball Hall of Fame as part of their inaugural class, and in 2023 he was inducted into the Braves Hall of Fame.

== Early life ==
Carty was born on September 1, 1939 in San Pedro de Macorís, Dominican Republic, where his father worked in a sugar mill. One of 16 children, he followed his uncles into the sport of boxing at the age of 15. He won his first 17 boxing matches but quit boxing for baseball after experiencing an embarrassing defeat in a boxing ring. Another source claims that he quit boxing at the behest of his mother.

At the age of 19, Carty represented the Dominican Republic as a catcher for the national baseball team at the 1959 Pan American Games in Chicago. His impressive hitting performance during the Pan American Games attracted contract offers from eight major-league teams and four Dominican League clubs. Being a naïve youngster with no English speaking skills, Carty unwittingly signed all the contracts. George Trautman, head of minor-league baseball at the time, resolved the issue in favor of the Milwaukee Braves who signed Carty as a free agent in 1959.

In 1962, he began to show his talent for hitting a baseball while playing for the Class-B Yakima Braves. Carty was leading the Northwest League with a .366 batting average until he injured his leg after he tripped over first base and missed the remainder of the season. He was named to the year-end league All-Star team and was the Topps Class-B All-Star catcher.

Carty had an intimidating presence while batting. He never left the batter's box and stood firmly throughout the at-bat while glaring menacingly at the opposing pitcher. He sometimes increased the level of intimidation by screaming at pitchers to challenge him with a fastball rather than breaking balls.

While Carty was considered an excellent hitter, he had poor defensive skills so, in order to lessen his defensive liabilities and to get his bat into the everyday lineup, the Braves made the decision to convert him into an outfielder in 1963. In his first season as an outfielder, he produced a .327 batting average along with 27 home runs, and 100 runs batted in (RBI) while playing for the Austin Senators of the Texas League. He made his major-league debut with the Braves on September 15, 1963 at the age of 24. The Sporting News named him the best hitting prospect in the Braves organization.

== Atlanta Braves career ==
After posting a .408 batting average during spring training, Carty made the Braves opening day roster in 1964. He finished the season with a .330 batting average, second only to Roberto Clemente in the National League. Despite his impressive performance, he finished second in the National League Rookie of the Year Award behind Dick Allen who had one of the most productive rookie seasons in MLB history. Braves manager Bobby Bragan tried to convert Carty into a first baseman during the 1965 season however, he injured his back while learning to play the new position. Carty's injury kept him from playing regularly, although he produced a .310 average in 83 games.

For the 1966 season the Braves moved to Atlanta and the new Atlanta–Fulton County Stadium. The stadium's elevation in the foothills of the Appalachian Mountains made it favorable to home run hitters, which led to the stadium's nickname, "The Launching Pad". Carty holds the distinction of being the first Braves player to record a hit after the franchise moved from Milwaukee to Atlanta in a game against the Pirates on April 12, 1966. He finished third behind Matty and Felipe Alou in the 1966 National League Batting Championship with a .326 batting average and quickly became a favorite in Atlanta where the left-field stands became known as “Carty’s Corner".

Carty had an extroverted personality and charmed fans with a cheerful disposition in public however, inside the Braves clubhouse he was not well-liked by many teammates, with even his Dominican teammates Felipe Alou and Sandy Alomar avoiding his belligerent, confrontational personality. On June 18, 1967, Carty was involved in a physical altercation with teammate Hank Aaron on a chartered Atlanta Braves flight from Houston to Los Angeles. Carty allegedly directed a racial slur toward Aaron, resulting in a fistfight where teammates had to separate them. Afterwards, Aaron said that he was frustrated by Carty's lack of effort on defense. Carty had a dismal season in 1967, slumping to a .255 batting average in part due to a separated shoulder. At the conclusion of the season, the Braves let it be known that they would be willing to trade Carty in exchange for pitchers.

Carty was diagnosed with tuberculosis during spring training in 1968. While the illness was not as serious as first suspected, he had to undergo six months of treatment in a sanatorium, forcing him to miss the entire 1968 season.

In the 1969 season, Carty suffered three shoulder separations but still posted a team-leading .342 batting average in 104 games, including a .383 average in the team's final 21 games when he had 22 RBI. He drove home the game-winning run in the division-clinching game as the Braves won the National League West title, the franchise's first postseason berth since the 1958 World Series. In the only postseason appearance of his career, Carty hit .300 along with a .462 on-base percentage and a .500 slugging average, but failed to produce any RBIs as the Braves would eventually lose to the "Miracle" Mets in the 1969 National League Championship Series. He finished 13th in the National League Most Valuable Player Award voting.

Carty had the best season of his career In 1970, hitting 25 home runs with 101 RBI and won the National League batting championship with a .366 batting average, the highest average in the major leagues since Ted Williams recorded a .388 batting average in 1957. Despite not appearing on the All-Star ballot, he became the first write-in candidate in MLB history to be elected as an All-Star starting player, playing alongside Hank Aaron and Willie Mays in the outfield for the National League team in the 1970 All-Star Game. It would be the only All-Star appearance of Carty's career.

Carty also compiled a 31-game hitting streak in 1970, the longest by a Braves player since Tommy Holmes hit in 37 straight for the Boston Braves in 1945. It was also the longest hitting streak in the franchise's Atlanta history until Dan Uggla surpassed it in 2011 with a 33-game streak. Carty was named NL Player of the Month for May with a .448 batting average, seven home runs, and 22 RBIs. He finished 10th in the 1970 National League Most Valuable Player Award voting. On May 31, Carty hit 3 home runs against the Phillies, going 4-for-4 with six RBIs in a 9–1 rout of the Phillies.

However, In the midst of his best season, Carty was involved in another physical altercation with a teammate on August 19, 1970. Ron Reed and Carty had a misunderstanding over his taking two souvenir baseball bats from Reed’s locker and giving them to a child. Reed confronted Carty which resulted in another fistfight. Despite having the highest career batting average among active players, Carty's reputation as a malcontent had worn out his welcome with the Braves management and the team actively sought to trade him.

While playing in the 1970-1971 Dominican winter league, Carty severely damaged his left knee when he collided with teammate Matty Alou in the outfield. He reported to spring training in 1971, but a blood clot in his damaged leg forced him to miss his second full season in four years.

On August 24, 1971, Carty and his brother-in-law were in a car at a stoplight in Atlanta when they were involved in an altercation with two off-duty Atlanta policemen. Carty took offense after one of the officers allegedly addressed him with a racial slur. He and his relative were beaten by the officers and arrested for assault. Afterwards, Atlanta Mayor Sam Massell called the incident “blatant brutality” and the officers were fired while the charges against Carty were dropped.

Carty returned in 1972 but only managed a .277 batting average in 86 games as he continued to struggle with his injuries which hindered his defensive performance. Carty was eventually traded from the Braves to the Texas Rangers for Jim Panther on October 27, 1972.

== Later Career ==
Texas Rangers manager Whitey Herzog expected Carty to fill the role of the newly adopted designated hitter position, but after hitting for only a .203 batting average he lost his place in the lineup. Carty and Herzog almost got into a fistfight in June after Carty alleged that Herzog did not back him in a dispute with an umpire. He was hitting for only a .232 batting average with three home runs and 33 RBIs in 86 games for the Rangers when the Chicago Cubs acquired him on waivers on August 13.

While with the Cubs, he had a personality clash with star third baseman Ron Santo, leading the team to trade Carty to the Oakland Athletics one month later. After a combined .229 batting average for the three teams, Carty was released by the Athletics in December 1973, and it seemed as if his career might be over.

In 1974, Carty signed to play with the Cafeteros de Córdoba in the Mexican Baseball League where he hit .354 with 11 home runs and 72 RBIs in 112 games, attracting the attention of the Cleveland Indians, who were involved in a tight pennant race. The Indians signed Carty to be their designated hitter on August 17, 1974 and he finished the season with a .363 batting average in 33 games. Carty's career was rejuvenated in Cleveland, posting a .308 batting average with 64 RBIs in the 1975 season and improving to a .310 batting average while leading the team with 83 RBIs in 1976. In 1977, he was fined by Indians manager Frank Robinson for insubordination after the two men had an altercation in the team dugout on June 6. Carty's batting average dropped to .280 in 1977, but he still led the team with 80 runs batted in.

When the Indians acquired Willie Horton, Carty became expendable and was traded to the Toronto Blue Jays for Dennis DeBarr on March 15, 1978. His time with the Blue Jays lasted five months before he was traded to the Oakland Athletics for Willie Horton and Phil Huffman on August 15, 1978. At the age of 39, he had his last productive season, hitting for a .282 average with 31 home runs and 99 RBIs between the two teams. Carty’s 31 home runs were his career high and set a new record at the time for designated hitters. After being granted free agency in November 1978, he signed a contract to play for the Blue Jays, hitting .256 with 12 home runs and 55 RBIs in 132 games. On August 6, 1979, Carty hit the 200th home run of his career, becoming the oldest player in MLB history to reach the milestone. He was unconditionally released by the Blue Jays on March 29, 1980, although he continued to work for the Blue Jays as a Latin American scout.

== Career statistics ==
In a fifteen-year major league career, Carty played in 1,651 games, accumulating 1,677 hits in 5,606 at bats for a .299 career batting average along with 204 home runs, 890 runs batted in, .369 on-base percentage and .464 slugging percentage. He maintained a career batting average above the .300 mark until his final season, when his career average dropped to .299. He ended his career with a .974 fielding percentage. During his career, he played as a catcher, first baseman, third baseman, outfielder and designated hitter.

As a pinch hitter, Carty was effective, going 41-134 (.306) in 158 pinch-hitting appearances with 4 home runs and 38 RBI in his MLB career.

== Humanitarianism ==
One of the early major leaguers out of the baseball-rich Dominican Republic, Carty was committed to helping the developing nation. In the 1964–65 off-season, as the country reeled between rapid governmental transitions and militarism, he undertook a trip with Catholic Relief Services to his home country, on a mission to deliver clothing and supplies.

== Death ==
Carty died in Atlanta, Georgia, on November 23, 2024, at the age of 85.

== Honors ==
In 1996, Carty was inducted into the Caribbean Baseball Hall of Fame as part of their inaugural class.

Carty was inducted into the Braves Hall of Fame on August 19, 2023. Notably, the Braves delayed Carty's induction until after the death of Hank Aaron on January 22, 2021, out of respect for the revered status Aaron held within the Braves organization.

== See also ==
- List of Major League Baseball batting champions

Preceded by Willie Davis	Major League Player of the Month; May 1970	Succeeded by Tommie Agee
