= Mike Morgan (baseball) =

American baseball player (born 1959)

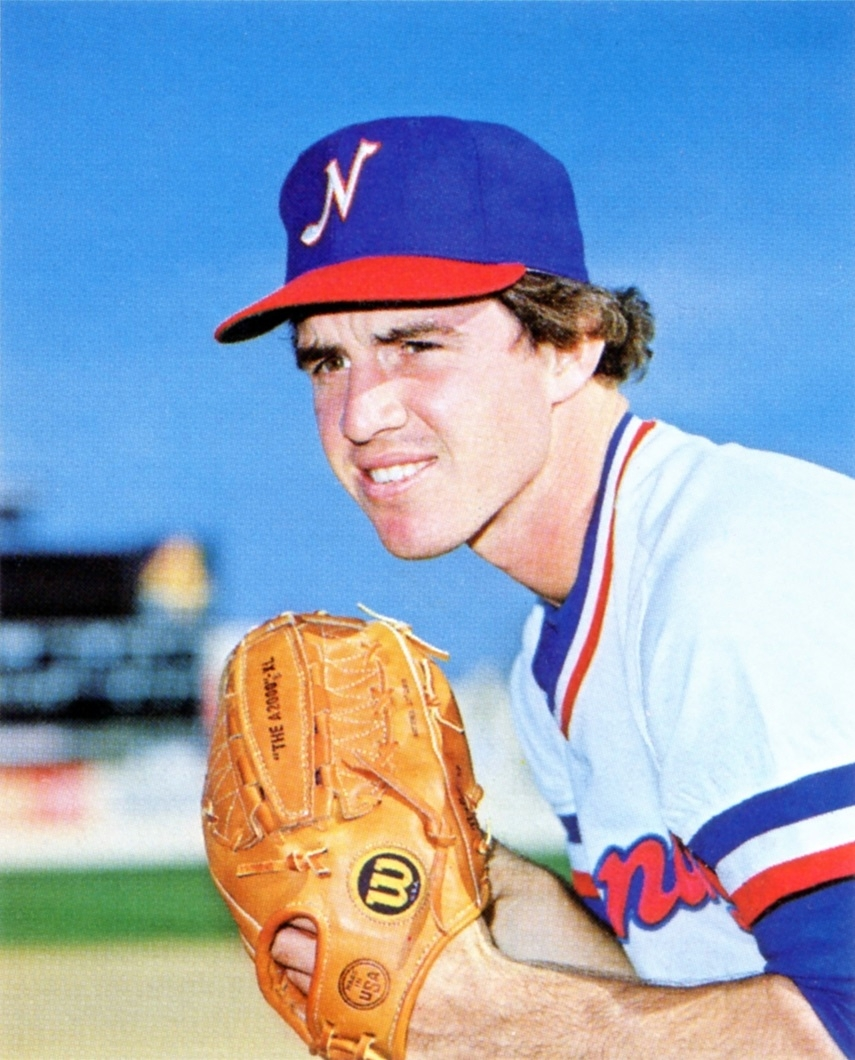
- Morgan with the Nashville Sounds in 1981
- Pitcher
- Born: October 8, 1959 (age 66); Tulare, California, U.S.
- Batted: Right Threw: Right

MLB debut
- June 11, 1978, for the Oakland Athletics

Last MLB appearance
- September 2, 2002, for the Arizona Diamondbacks

MLB statistics
- Win–loss record: 141–186
- Earned run average: 4.23
- Strikeouts: 1,403
- Stats at Baseball Reference

Teams
- Oakland Athletics (1978–1979); New York Yankees (1982); Toronto Blue Jays (1983); Seattle Mariners (1985–1987); Baltimore Orioles (1988); Los Angeles Dodgers (1989–1991); Chicago Cubs (1992–1995); St. Louis Cardinals (1995–1996); Cincinnati Reds (1996–1997); Minnesota Twins (1998); Chicago Cubs (1998); Texas Rangers (1999); Arizona Diamondbacks (2000–2002)

Career highlights and awards
- All-Star (1991); World Series champion (2001)

Michael Thomas Morgan (born October 8, 1959) is an American former right-handed pitcher in Major League Baseball. He played for 12 different teams over 25 years, and is one of 31 players in baseball history to appear in Major League baseball games in four decades (1978–2002). Upon his retirement, Morgan held the major league record for most major league teams played for (12), but this record was surpassed by Octavio Dotel in 2012 and Edwin Jackson in 2018. Because of this, Morgan was nicknamed "the Nomad" by his teammates due to his constant travel from team to team.

== Major League debut ==
After attending Valley High School in Las Vegas, Nevada, and pitching for the baseball team, Morgan was selected by the Oakland Athletics in the first round (fourth overall) of the 1978 Major League Baseball draft. Morgan made his major league debut on June 11, throwing a complete game in a 3–0 loss to Scott McGregor and the Baltimore Orioles. After losing his first three starts in Oakland, Morgan was sent down to AAA Vancouver for the rest of the season, going 5–6 with a 5.58 earned run average (ERA) in 92 innings pitched. Although he had put up less than spectacular numbers as an 18-year-old, including an alarming strikeout-to-walk ratio of 0.5:1 (31 strikeouts and 62 walks), he was clearly on the fast track.

After starting the 1979 season with the AAA Ogden A's, Morgan was called up again to the big club after posting a 5–5 record with a 3.48 ERA in 101 innings. However, he again appeared overmatched, finishing the season 2-10 for the A's. Morgan then spent the next two seasons in the minor leagues. After finishing another unspectacular season in 1980, going 6-9 back at Ogden, Oakland traded Morgan on November 3 to the New York Yankees for 33-year-old infielder, Fred Stanley. The Yankees then demoted Morgan and assigned him to the AA Nashville Sounds where he posted an 8–7 record with a 4.42 ERA in 169 innings.

== "The Nomad" ==
Morgan was nearly dealt along with Oscar Gamble and Bob Watson from the Yankees to the Texas Rangers for Al Oliver prior to the 1982 regular season, but the transaction was squashed by Gamble whose contract had a list of eight teams to which he can be traded which did not include the Rangers. He pitched the entire 1982 season for the Yankees, pitching in 30 games with 23 starts. On December 9, Morgan was traded again, this time to the Toronto Blue Jays (along with outfielder/first baseman Dave Collins and future Hall of Fame first baseman Fred McGriff) for minor league third baseman Tom Dodd and reliever Dale Murray. Morgan then split time between Toronto and AAA Syracuse in 1983 before spending the entire 1984 season at Syracuse. In December 1984, Morgan was taken off the Blue Jays' 40-man roster and was subsequently chosen by the Seattle Mariners in the Rule 5 draft. After losing much of 1985 to arm trouble, Morgan spent most of the next three seasons pitching for Seattle and compiling similar numbers to his career average, going 24–35 with a 4.53 over 429 innings with 216 strikeouts and 144 walks. In a hint of later career success, Morgan collected his first career save in 1986. Although showing himself to be a solidly average starting pitcher, he would continue to struggle with his control, annually putting up dismal strikeouts-to-walk ratios, and failing to show the promise that made him a first round selection. Morgan was acquired by the Baltimore Orioles from the Mariners for Ken Dixon at the Winter Meetings on December 9, 1987. He split the 1988 season between Baltimore and AAA Rochester. That year he was recognized for his humanitarian work by winning the Little League's Junior Cy Young Award.

Morgan was sent to his sixth franchise in a trade from the Orioles to the Los Angeles Dodgers for Mike Devereaux on March 11, 1989. He remained with the Dodgers from 1989 to 1991. He had his first winning season as a pro in 1991 and earned his lone All-Star selection while finishing a 14–10 record. Morgan also led the National League with four shutouts in 1990, tied with the San Diego Padres' Bruce Hurst. On July 28, he was at the losing end of Montreal Expos pitcher Dennis Martínez's perfect game, even though Morgan himself was perfect through the first five innings.

After leaving Los Angeles as a free agent, Morgan signed with the Chicago Cubs from 1992 to 1995. In 1992, Morgan finishing the season 16–8 with a 2.55 ERA over 240 innings – easily the best season of his career. However, he could not repeat his efforts and went 12–25 over the next two seasons after again experiencing arm trouble. After seeming to bounce back in the beginning of 1995, starting the season 2–1 with a 2.19 ERA for the Cubs, he was traded to the St. Louis Cardinals (along with minor leaguer catcher Francisco Morales and first baseman/third baseman Paul Torres) for third baseman Todd Zeile and cash, and went 5–6 in 17 starts the rest of the way. In 1996, Morgan would return to his previous form, posting a 4–8 record with a 5.24 ERA, and was released by the Cardinals on August 28. He would not be unemployed long as he signed with the Cincinnati Reds on September 4 and spent the remainder of the 1996 and all of 1997 with the Reds.

== Post-season play ==
After leaving the Reds as a free Agent, Morgan signed in December 1997 with the Minnesota Twins. After putting up good numbers with the Twins through August (4–2 with a 3.49 ERA and only 24 walks in 98 innings), Morgan was traded on August 25 back to the Cubs for pitcher Scott Downs and cash. While with the Cubs, he was on the mound when Mark McGwire hit his record-tying 61st home run. He also went to the post-season for the first time, relieving in two games without giving up a run, but the Cubs lost to the Atlanta Braves in the National League Division Series. On January 29, 1999, Morgan joined his 11th team, signing with the Texas Rangers as a free agent. Although he pitched to a 13–10 record, he had an ERA of 6.24 and was demoted to the bullpen late in the season.

Prior to spring training in 2000, the 40-year-old signed with his 12th team, the Arizona Diamondbacks, who successfully converted Morgan to a full-time reliever. Morgan excelled in this new role and appeared in 60 games, pitched 100 innings, and compiled an ERA that was only slightly above career average. After pitching in 31 games in 2001, including his last career start, Morgan was again in the post-season with the D-backs, appeared in all three rounds, and threw 4 2/3 innings of scoreless relief helping Arizona defeat the New York Yankees in seven games to win the 2001 World Series. He was back with Arizona again in 2002 and pitched 28 games over the first three months before being sidelined by an injury. He came back to make the final appearance of his career on September 2, pitching 1 1/3 innings and giving up an unearned run in a 19–1 loss to the Dodgers. Morgan finished the season 1–1 with a 5.29 ERA and was not included on the D-Backs' post-season roster. Following the season, Morgan retired from baseball after 21 seasons.

Morgan was the last active player to have competed during the 1978 season and one of the last four (the others being Jesse Orosco, Rickey Henderson and Tim Raines) to have debuted in the 1970s. In the 597 games Morgan pitched, 411 were starts. His career record was 141–186 with a 4.23 ERA with 1403 strikeouts and eight saves in 2772 1/3 innings.

Morgan was tied with National Hockey League player Mike Sillinger and MLB pitcher Matt Skrmetta for the most teams played for in any North American professional sport through June 2006, when Skrmetta signed with the Chicago White Sox, his 24th professional team and 13th organization.

== Personal life ==
Morgan currently resides in Ogden, Utah, and owns "World Championship Outfitters", a company which takes people on private hunts with Morgan as the guide. In 2010, he created the "Robinson's Transport Wounded Warrior Hunt", a hunting trip for military members who have received a Purple Heart.

== See also ==
- List of baseball players who went directly to Major League Baseball
- List of Major League Baseball players who played in four decades
- List of Major League Baseball career losses leaders
