= Gary Alexander (baseball) =

American baseball player (born 1953)

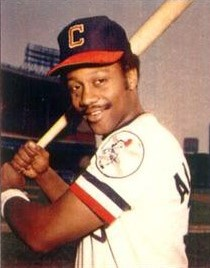
- Catcher
- Born: March 27, 1953 (age 73); Los Angeles, California, U.S.
- Batted: Right Threw: Right

MLB debut
- September 12, 1975, for the San Francisco Giants

Last MLB appearance
- September 28, 1981, for the Pittsburgh Pirates

MLB statistics
- Batting average: .230
- Home runs: 55
- Runs batted in: 202
- Stats at Baseball Reference

Teams
- San Francisco Giants (1975–1977); Oakland Athletics (1978); Cleveland Indians (1978–1980); Pittsburgh Pirates (1981)

Gary Wayne Alexander (born March 27, 1953) is an American former professional baseball player. He played in Major League Baseball (MLB) as a catcher from 1975 through 1981 for the San Francisco Giants, Oakland Athletics, Cleveland Indians and Pittsburgh Pirates. Alexander caught John Montefusco's no-hitter in 1976.

Alexander was traded along with Gary Thomasson, Dave Heaverlo, John Henry Johnson, Phil Huffman, Alan Wirth and $300,000 from the Giants to the Athletics for Vida Blue on March 15, 1978. Mario Guerrero was sent to the Athletics on April 7 to complete the transaction. Alexander was dealt again three months later at the trade deadline on June 15 when he went from the Athletics to the Indians for Joe Wallis. On September 26, 1978, his home run with two outs in the ninth inning ended a no-hit bid by Mike Flanagan of the Baltimore Orioles.

In a seven-season major league career, Alexander posted a .230 batting average with 55 home runs and 202 RBI in 432 games played. His best statistical season was in 1978 when he hit 27 home runs and had 84 RBI's, 57 runs, 112 hits and 20 doubles in 148 games played, all career-highs.

Alexander retired in 2020 as a captain in the Los Angeles (CA) Fire Department.
