= Joe Wallis =

American baseball player (born 1952)

- Center fielder
- Born: January 9, 1952 (age 74); East St. Louis, Illinois, U.S.
- Batted: Switch Threw: Right

MLB debut
- September 2, 1975, for the Chicago Cubs

Last MLB appearance
- September 30, 1979, for the Oakland Athletics

MLB statistics
- Batting average: .244
- Home runs: 16
- Runs batted in: 68
- Stats at Baseball Reference

Teams
- Chicago Cubs (1975–1978); Oakland Athletics (1978–1979)

Harold Joseph Wallis (born January 9, 1952) is an American former center fielder who spent five seasons in Major League Baseball with the Chicago Cubs and Oakland Athletics. He was nicknamed "Tarzan" because of his penchant for cliff diving.

A native of East St. Louis, Illinois, Wallis attended McCluer High School and Southern Illinois University Carbondale. In 1971 and 1972, he played collegiate summer baseball with the Chatham A's of the Cape Cod Baseball League. He was selected by the Cubs in the sixth round of the 1973 MLB draft.

Wallis broke up Tom Seaver's fifth attempt at his first-ever no-hitter with a two-out single to right field in the ninth inning of the Cubs' eleven-inning 1–0 win over the New York Mets at Wrigley Field on September 24, 1975.

Wallis was dealt twice at the trade deadline on June 15, 1978. The Cubs first traded him to the Cleveland Indians for Mike Vail. The Indians then sent him to the Oakland Athletics for Gary Alexander an hour after the first transaction. Wallis finished his major league career with Oakland the following season.
