= Scott Meyer (baseball) =

American baseball player

- Catcher
- Born: August 19, 1957; Evergreen Park, Illinois, U.S.
- Batted: Right Threw: Right

MLB debut
- September 10, 1978, for the Oakland Athletics

Last MLB appearance
- October 1, 1978, for the Oakland Athletics

MLB statistics
- Games played: 8
- At bats: 9
- Hits: 1
- Stats at Baseball Reference

Teams
- Oakland Athletics (1978)

Scott William Meyer (born August 19, 1957) is an American former catcher in Major League Baseball. He played for the Oakland Athletics in 1978.
