= Darrell Woodard =

American baseball player (born 1956)

- Second baseman
- Born: December 10, 1956 (age 69); Wilmar, Arkansas, U.S.
- Batted: Right Threw: Right

MLB debut
- August 6, 1978, for the Oakland Athletics

Last MLB appearance
- October 1, 1978, for the Oakland Athletics

MLB statistics
- Games played: 33
- At bats: 9
- Runs scored: 10
- Stats at Baseball Reference

Teams
- Oakland Athletics (1978)

Darrell Lee Woodard (born December 10, 1956) is an American former professional baseball player. He played part of one season in Major League Baseball for the Oakland Athletics during the 1978 season. A second baseman for most of his professional career, he was primarily used by Oakland as a pinch runner, appearing in that capacity in 22 of his 33 games played.
