= Alan Wirth =

American baseball player (born 1956)

- Pitcher
- Born: December 8, 1956 (age 69); Mesa, Arizona, U.S.
- Batted: Right Threw: Right

MLB debut
- April 9, 1978, for the Oakland Athletics

Last MLB appearance
- July 13, 1980, for the Oakland Athletics

MLB statistics
- Win–loss record: 6–6
- Earned run average: 3.78
- Strikeouts: 39
- Stats at Baseball Reference

Teams
- Oakland Athletics (1978–1980)

Alan Lee Wirth (born December 8, 1956) is an American former professional baseball pitcher. Wirth pitched in parts of three seasons in Major League Baseball, from 1978 until 1980, for the Oakland Athletics.

== Career ==
Wirth was originally drafted by the San Francisco Giants in the 3rd round of the 1974 Major League Baseball draft. After four seasons in its organization, he was part of a 7-for-1 trade in which he along with Gary Thomasson, Gary Alexander, Dave Heaverlo, John Henry Johnson, Phil Huffman and $300,000 were sent to the A's for Vida Blue on March 15, 1978. Mario Guerrero was sent to the Athletics just over three weeks later on April 7 to complete the transaction.

Wirth started the 1978 season with Oakland, but was sent to the minors in June. He also split the next two seasons between the major league A's and their minor league Ogden A's farm team. In all, Wirth pitched in 23 games over three seasons for Oakland before being released during spring training in 1981. He was signed by the Seattle Mariners, and spent the 1981 season with their top farm team, the Spokane Indians. After spending the 1982 season in the Baltimore Orioles and Detroit Tigers organizations, he retired.

== Personal life ==
Wirth's daughter Christina was an All-American basketball player for the Vanderbilt Commodores, and later played one season for the Indiana Fever. His oldest daughter Alana played basketball at Barry University, and a third daughter, Theresa, played at the University of Denver. His son, Joe, played high school soccer for Mountain View and went on to play for Scottsdale Community College. His youngest daughters, identical twins Jenn and LeeAnne, currently play at Gonzaga University, with Jenn sharing West Coast Conference Player of the Year honors in 2021 with BYU's Shaylee Gonzales.
