= Phil Huffman =

American baseball player (born 1958)

- Pitcher
- Born: June 20, 1958 (age 66); Freeport, Texas, U.S.
- Batted: Right Threw: Right

MLB debut
- April 10, 1979, for the Toronto Blue Jays

Last MLB appearance
- October 3, 1985, for the Baltimore Orioles

MLB statistics
- Win–loss record: 6–18
- Earned run average: 6.03
- Strikeouts: 58
- Stats at Baseball Reference

Teams
- Toronto Blue Jays (1979); Baltimore Orioles (1985)

Phillip Lee Huffman (born June 20, 1958) is an American former professional baseball pitcher. He played two seasons in Major League Baseball (MLB) for the Toronto Blue Jays and Baltimore Orioles.

== Early life and education ==
Huffman played high school baseball in Texas for Brazoswood High School near his native Freeport, Texas.

== Baseball career ==
Huffman was drafted out of high school in Texas in June 1977 by the San Francisco Giants as the team's second-round draft pick. In 1977, Huffman made 10 starts for the Great Falls Voyagers in the Pioneer Baseball League, a Class A rookie league, going 7–3.

Huffman was part of a 7-for-1 transaction that sent him along with Gary Thomasson, Gary Alexander, Dave Heaverlo, John Henry Johnson, Alan Wirth and $300,000 to the Oakland Athletics for Vida Blue on March 15, 1978. Mario Guerrero was sent to the Athletics just over three weeks later on April 7 to complete the transaction.

Huffman began the 1978 season pitching with the Jersey City A's in the Eastern League AA league. Partway through the 1978 season, he was promoted to Oakland's AAA Vancouver Canadians minor-league club.

Huffman was traded along with Willie Horton from the Athletics to the Toronto Blue Jays for Rico Carty on August 15, 1978, and transferred to the Syracuse Chiefs.

== 1979 season ==
Huffman made the Blue Jays' big-league roster in 1979 and remained with the team for the entire season. Overall, the season was a disappointment, as he went 6–18. He made 31 starts, posted a 5.77 earned-run average and gave up 25 home runs.

On August 27, 1979, Huffman pitched what easily was his best game in his major-league career, tossing a one-hitter against the Oakland Athletics in Toronto. Huffman posted his first win at Exhibition Stadium after six losses. Huffman retired the first 11 hitters, faced only 30 batters in total, and gave up the lone hit to Jim Essian in the sixth inning. He also walked Mike Heath and Mario Guerrero. The win was Huffman's final victory as a major league pitcher. "It's always great to beat a club you played with," Huffman said after the game. "I know all those guys over there. As for thinking of a no-hitter, I wasn't necessarily doing that. It's tough to pitch a no-hitter. I'm happy I got the shutout and only gave up one hit."

In 1980, Huffman was set to start the season with Toronto, but was optioned to the team's AAA farm club in Syracuse after manager Bobby Mattick chose to go with a four-man rotation. "Phil has added a changeup to his pitching and he's been one of our top workers," Mattick said in April 1980. "But we want him to get a lot of work and he'll get it at Syracuse." Huffman never ended up joining the major-league staff during the 1980 season, however.

Huffman remained in the Blue Jays' system in 1981 as well, going 5–9 with a 5.69 earned run average while at Syracuse.

== After Toronto ==
On March 25, 1982, the Blue Jays traded Huffman to the Kansas City Royals for Rance Mulliniks. Huffman was assigned to the Royals' AAA Omaha Royals minor-league farm club, where he spent the entire season. On April 2, 1983, the Royals released Huffman.

On May 24, 1983, Huffman signed as a free agent with the New York Mets. He pitched for the team's Tidewater Tides AAA farm club during 1983 and 1984. On July 13, 1984, the Baltimore Orioles purchased Huffman's contract from the Mets, and he finished out the season at Baltimore's Charlotte O's AA farm club.

== 1985 season ==
In 1985, Huffman began the season with Baltimore's Rochester Red Wings AAA farm club. On July 10, 1985, Huffman was called up to the majors to fill the roster spot vacated by injured reliever Nate Snell. At the time, Huffman was 6–7 with Rochester. Huffman only appeared in two games—one on July 13, 1985, against the Chicago White Sox (in which he gave up four earned runs in 1/3 of an inning pitched)—in his first stint with Baltimore that year before being sent back to the minors. He then was recalled at the end of the season and pitched in just one more game, starting the October 3, 1985 second game of a doubleheader against the Boston Red Sox, being pulled from the game in the fifth inning after giving up an RBI single to future Hall of Famer Wade Boggs. For his 1985 major-league season, Huffman went 0-0 and posted a 15.43 earned run average in two games, pitching 4 2/3 innings, giving up seven hits, eight earned runs and striking out two.

== Later career ==
On June 26, 1987, Rochester released Huffman after he went 5–6 with a 4.78 earned run average. "Phil is one of the older, veteran pitchers," Rochester manager John Hart was quoted as saying. "He would be a stabilizing factor on the ballclub, but we just didn't feel at this time Phil would help us out at the big-league level."

After his release from Rochester, Huffman joined the Minnesota Twins' Portland Beavers AAA farm club for the balance of 1987, posting a 1–2 record with a 9.37 earned run average in nine games. After 1987, Huffman stopped playing organized baseball.

== Today ==
By 2002, Huffman was living in Rochester, New York and was the supervisor for a welding supply company that distributes high-pressured liquid oxygen, nitrogen, carbon dioxide and flammable gas.
