= Mario Guerrero =

Dominican baseball player (1949–2023)

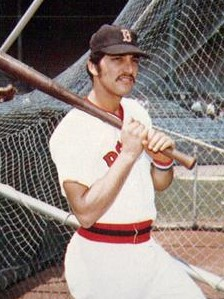
- Guerrero in 1974
- Shortstop
- Born: September 28, 1949; Santo Domingo, Dominican Republic
- Died: July 2, 2023 (aged 73); Santo Domingo, Dominican Republic
- Batted: Right Threw: Right

MLB debut
- April 8, 1973, for the Boston Red Sox

Last MLB appearance
- October 1, 1980, for the Oakland Athletics

MLB statistics
- Batting average: .257
- Home runs: 7
- Runs batted in: 170
- Stats at Baseball Reference

Teams
- Boston Red Sox (1973–1974); St. Louis Cardinals (1975); California Angels (1976–1977); Oakland Athletics (1978–1980)

Mario Miguel Guerrero Abud (September 28, 1949 – July 2, 2023) was a Dominican professional baseball player who was a shortstop in Major League Baseball (MLB) for four teams in an eight-year career from 1973 to 1980.

== Career ==
Guerrero signed with the New York Yankees as an amateur free agent in 1968. After four plus seasons in their farm system, he was sent to the Boston Red Sox on June 30, 1972, as the player to be named later in the deal that brought future Cy Young Award winner Sparky Lyle to the Yankees in exchange for Danny Cater. Guerrero made the Red Sox out of spring training 1973 and appeared in 66 games as a backup to starting shortstop Luis Aparicio and second baseman Doug Griffin.

The Red Sox released Aparicio during spring training in March 1974, clearing the way for Guerrero to become the team's starting shortstop. He wound up sharing the position with rookie Rick Burleson, however, with Burleson ultimately totaling more games and plate appearances than Guerrero while dividing his time between short, second base and third.

In early April 1975, the Red Sox traded Guerrero to the St. Louis Cardinals for a player to be named, with pitcher Jim Willoughby eventually going to the Red Sox, on July 4. Guerrero split 1975 between the Cardinals and their triple A affiliate, the Tulsa Oilers, batting .239 in 64 games at the major league level. He was assigned to Tulsa in 1976 when he was traded to the California Angels for two minor leaguers.

Guerrero signed as a free agent with the San Francisco Giants after the 1977 season, only to be sent to Oakland Athletics on April 7, 1978, to complete a trade in which the Athletics also acquired Gary Thomasson, Gary Alexander, Dave Heaverlo, John Henry Johnson, Phil Huffman, Alan Wirth and $300,000 for Vida Blue just over three weeks earlier on March 15. He played three seasons in Oakland before his contract was purchased by the Seattle Mariners. Guerrero retired following his release from the Mariners in spring training 1981.

Although Guerrero played in 697 games over 8 seasons and collected over 500 career hits, he finished with exactly 0 career wins above replacement (WAR). This suggests that, statistically, his overall contributions to his teams were equivalent to those of a readily available replacement-level player, typically someone from the minor leagues, rather than elevating the team's performance above that baseline.

== Personal life and death ==
His brother Epy Guerrero was a coach for the Toronto Blue Jays. While working as a buscón (headhunter) in the Dominican Republic, Guerrero sued Raúl Mondesí for 1% of his salary. He ended up winning a $640,000 judgment.

Mario Guerrero died on July 2, 2023, at the age of 73.
