= Vida Blue =

American baseball player (1949–2023)

- Blue in 1970
- Pitcher
- Born: July 28, 1949; Mansfield, Louisiana, U.S.
- Died: May 6, 2023 (aged 73); Tracy, California, U.S.
- Batted: Switch Threw: Left

MLB debut
- July 20, 1969, for the Oakland Athletics

Last MLB appearance
- October 2, 1986, for the San Francisco Giants

MLB statistics
- Win–loss record: 209–161
- Earned run average: 3.27
- Strikeouts: 2,175
- Stats at Baseball Reference

Teams
- Oakland Athletics (1969–1977); San Francisco Giants (1978–1981); Kansas City Royals (1982–1983); San Francisco Giants (1985–1986)

Career highlights and awards
- 6× All-Star (1971, 1975, 1977, 1978, 1980, 1981); 3× World Series champion (1972–1974); AL MVP (1971); AL Cy Young Award (1971); AL ERA leader (1971); Pitched a no-hitter on September 21, 1970; Pitched a combined no-hitter on September 28, 1975; Athletics Hall of Fame; San Francisco Giants Wall of Fame

Vida Rochelle Blue Jr. (/vaɪdɑː/; July 28, 1949 – May 6, 2023) was an American professional baseball player. He was a left-handed pitcher in Major League Baseball from 1969 to 1986, most notably as an integral member of the Oakland Athletics dynasty that won three consecutive World Series championships from 1972 to 1974. He won the American League (AL) Cy Young Award and Most Valuable Player Award in 1971.

A six-time All-Star, Blue was the first of only five pitchers in major league history to start the All-Star Game for both the AL (1971) and the National League (1978). During his 17-year career, he pitched for the Athletics (1969–1977), San Francisco Giants (1978–1981; 1985–1986), and Kansas City Royals (1982–1983).

== Early life ==
Blue was born and raised in Mansfield, Louisiana. He was the oldest of six children born to Vida Blue Sr., a laborer in a Mansfield iron foundry, and Sallie.

Blue attended DeSoto High School in Mansfield. He pitched for the baseball team and quarterbacked the football team. In his senior year, he threw for 3,400 yards and completed 35 touchdown passes while rushing for 1,600 yards in football, then threw a no-hitter with 21 strikeouts in just seven innings pitched in baseball.

== Baseball career ==
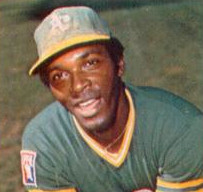
Blue with the Athletics

Blue was a power pitcher who worked fast and attacked the strike zone. He threw an occasional curveball to keep hitters off balance and an above average change-up, but his signature pitch was a fastball which he threw consistently at 94 miles per hour (151 km/h), but could reach 100 miles per hour (160 km/h). In The Neyer/James Guide to Pitchers, all-time hits leader Pete Rose stated that Blue "threw as hard as anyone" he ever faced, and baseball historian Bill James cited Blue as the hardest-throwing lefty, and the second-hardest thrower of his era, behind only Nolan Ryan.

=== Oakland Athletics (1969–1977) ===
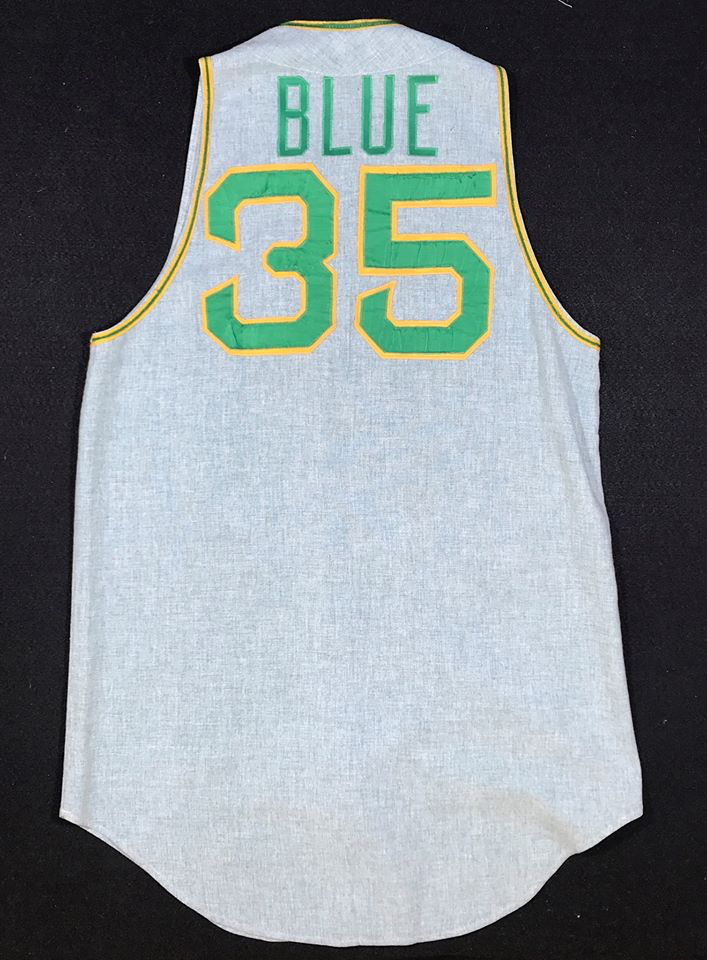
1970 Oakland Athletics jersey

The then-Kansas City Athletics selected Blue in the second round of the 1967 MLB draft. Though he was recruited to play college football for the University of Notre Dame, Purdue University, and the University of Houston, Blue chose to sign with the Athletics for $12,500 per year to help support his family after his father's death.

Blue began the 1969 season with the Birmingham A's and was promoted to make his major league debut on July 20. In 1970, after spending the season in the minor leagues with the Midwest League Single-A Burlington Bees and the Iowa Oaks of the American Association, Blue was called up in September, making two starts. On September 11, he shut out the Kansas City Royals 3–0, giving up only one hit, to Pat Kelly in the eighth inning. Ten days later, Blue no-hit the defending and eventual repeat American League (AL) West champion Minnesota Twins, 6–0, at Oakland–Alameda County Coliseum, the lone baserunner coming on Harmon Killebrew's fourth-inning walk. He was the fourth-youngest pitcher to throw a no-hitter.

Blue had a 24–8 record in 1971, an AL leading 1.82 earned run average (ERA) and eight shutouts, and struck out 301 batters, winning both the AL Cy Young Award and Most Valuable Player Award. He also led the AL in complete games (24), shutouts (8), and ERA. That season, the Athletics won the AL West title for the franchise's first postseason berth since the Philadelphia Athletics in the 1931 World Series. He got off to a terrific start, going 10–1 when he linked up with Boston's Sonny Siebert, who was 8–0, in a dramatic May matchup in Boston. The game was won by Siebert and the Red Sox 4–3, and remains what is considered one of the most dramatic games in Fenway Park history. Blue was the youngest AL player to win the MVP Award in the 20th century. He was the starting pitcher for the AL in the 1971 All-Star Game. He became the only player ever to be a starting pitcher in the league opener (against the Washington Senators), the All-Star Game, and the playoff opener (against the Baltimore Orioles) in the same season. In 1971, Blue was on the covers of Sports Illustrated and Time magazine. In 1972, his success in baseball led Blue to a small role in the film Black Gunn, starring Jim Brown.

After Blue's breakthrough season in 1971, he and Athletics owner Charlie Finley clashed over his salary. Blue, who had earned $14,000 in 1971, sought a $92,500 salary. He held out, missing much of the year, before he and Finley settled at $63,000. Blue ended up with a 6–10 record in spite of a 2.80 ERA in 1972. He did not make the Athletics' post-season starting rotation, instead pitching mainly in relief. Against the Cincinnati Reds in the 1972 World Series he made four appearances, including a save in Game 1, a blown save in Game 4, and a loss in a spot-start in Game 6.

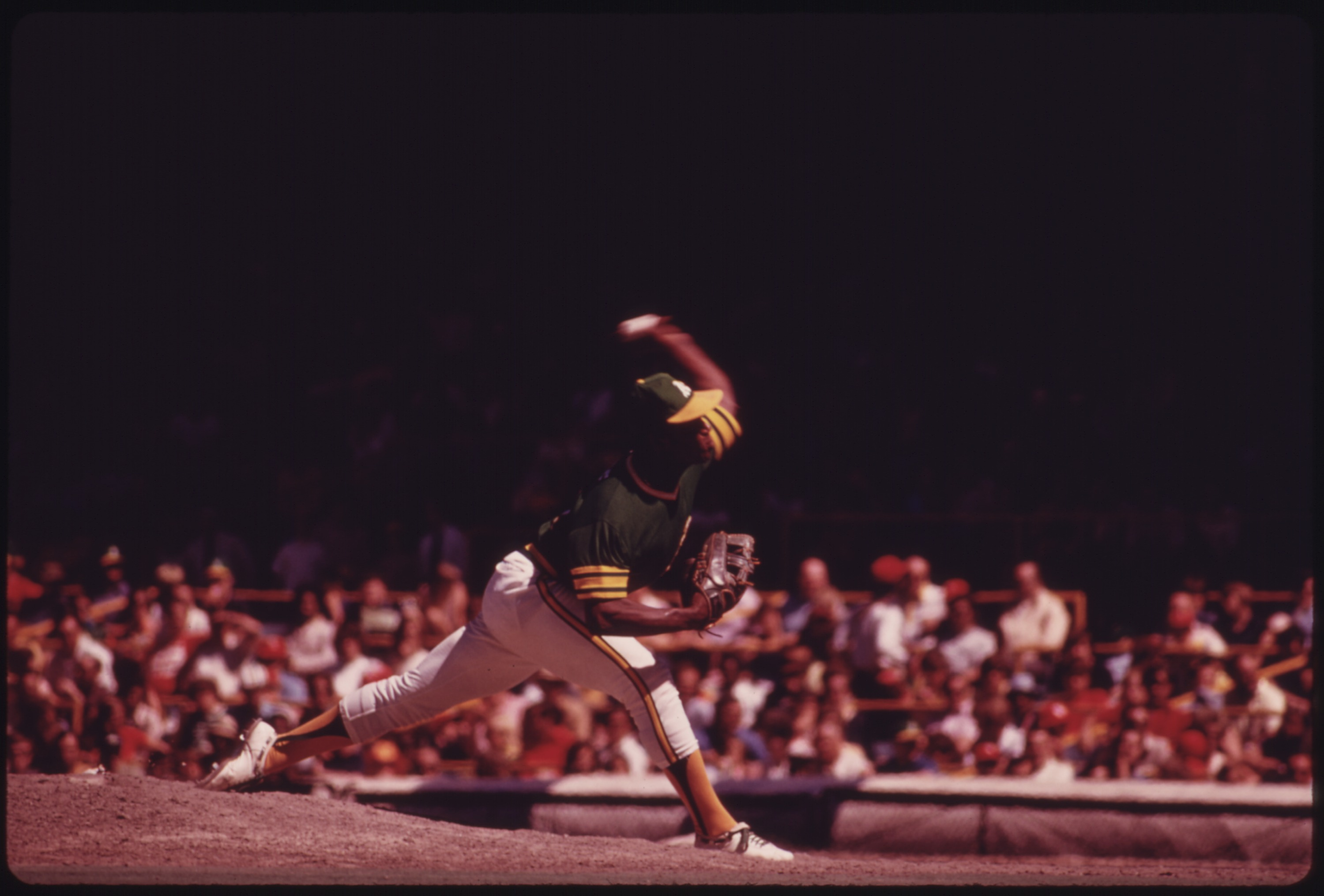
Blue pitches for the Oakland A's in 1973

Blue went 20–9 in 1973, 17–15 in 1974, and 22–11 in 1975, as an integral member of the Athletics' five straight AL West division titles from 1971 to 1975, and three consecutive World Championships in 1972, 1973, and 1974. Perhaps his finest postseason performances were four innings of shutout relief work against the Detroit Tigers to save Game 5 of the 1972 AL Championship Series (ALCS) and a complete-game 1–0 shutout against the Orioles in Game 3 of the 1974 ALCS. On September 28, 1975, Blue, Glenn Abbott, Paul Lindblad, and Rollie Fingers combined to no-hit the California Angels 5–0.

After an 18–13 season with a 2.35 ERA in 1976, Blue told reporters, "I hope the next breath Charlie Finley takes is his last. I hope he falls flat on his face and dies of polio." In June 1976, baseball commissioner Bowie Kuhn vetoed an attempt by Finley to sell Blue's contract to the New York Yankees and did the same thing on January 30, 1978 to a trade announced by the Reds at the Winter Meetings on December 9, 1977, that would've had Blue sent to Cincinnati for Dave Revering and $1.75 million. In both instances, Kuhn said the trades would be bad for baseball because they would benefit already powerful teams without making them give up any significant talent in return. At the end of the 1976 season, nearly the entire A's roster of star players from Oakland's championship teams left with baseball's new free agency, or were traded off by Finley, leaving Blue, who was still under contract with Oakland, to mentor a new team of primarily rookies and other young players. Alvin Dark, who managed Blue in 1974 and 1975, was surprised that Blue had remained with the team, writing that he "must have gotten the contract concessions he wanted." In the 1977 season, Blue went 14–19 with a 3.83 ERA and leading the AL both in hits and earned runs surrendered.

=== San Francisco Giants (1978–1981) ===
In March 1978, the Athletics traded Blue to the San Francisco Giants for Gary Thomasson, Gary Alexander, Dave Heaverlo, John Henry Johnson, Phil Huffman, Alan Wirth, and $300,000. Mario Guerrero was sent to the Athletics as a player to be named later to complete the transaction.

In 1978, Blue went 18–10 with a 2.79 ERA as he led the Giants to 89 wins and a third-place finish in the National League West Division, which was won by the Los Angeles Dodgers. He started for the National League (NL) in the 1978 All-Star Game. He won the Sporting News NL Pitcher of the Year.

Blue went 14–14 with a career worst 5.01 ERA as a full-time starter in 1979, 14–10 with a 2.97 ERA in 1980, and 8–6 with a 2.45 ERA in 1981, a strike-interrupted season.

=== Kansas City Royals (1982–1983) ===
The Giants traded Blue to the Kansas City Royals for Atlee Hammaker, Craig Chamberlain, Renie Martin, and Brad Wellman on March 30, 1982. Blue went 13–12 with a 3.78 ERA in 31 starts in 31 appearances. In 1983, Blue went 0–5 with a 6.01 ERA in 19 appearances, 13 of them starts. Blue was released mid-season, on August 6.

After the 1983 season, Blue and former teammates Willie Wilson, Jerry Martin, and Willie Aikens pleaded guilty to attempting to purchase cocaine. Blue was sentenced to three months in prison and was suspended for the 1984 season.

=== San Francisco Giants (1985–1986) ===
In April 1985, Blue returned as a free agent to the Giants on a one-year deal. He went 8–8 with a 4.47 ERA in 33 appearances, 20 of them starts, the rest in middle-inning and mop-up relief.

In 1985, Blue testified in the Pittsburgh drug trials.

Blue re-signed on another one-year deal in 1986, finishing his career going 10–10 with a 3.27 ERA in 28 appearances, all starts, at the age of 36. On April 20, he won his 200th career MLB game. Blue signed with Oakland for the 1987 season, but announced his retirement that February.

== Post-pitching career ==
After baseball, Blue was a baseball analyst for NBC Sports Bay Area, the TV home of the San Francisco Giants.

Blue's troubles with substance abuse continued to haunt him after his playing career, as he faced multiple DUI charges in 2005. He acknowledged that the trials may have influenced him being left off the Hall of Fame ballot after one year, stating, "I had some issues in my life that might have had a tendency to sway voting. There are some guys in the Hall of Fame who don't have halos."

=== Charity work ===
In 1971, Blue accompanied Bob Hope on his USO Christmas tour of Vietnam and other military installations. Blue remained active, working for numerous charitable causes including Safeway All Stars Challenge Sports, automobile donations, celebrity golf tournaments, and children's charities.

Blue was also active promoting baseball in Costa Rica.

== Personal life and death ==
In September 1989, Blue married Peggy Shannon on the pitcher's mound at Candlestick Park. His best man was former teammate Willie McCovey and Orlando Cepeda escorted Shannon to the mound.

They had twin girls and divorced in 1996. He also had a son Derrick and two other daughters.

After retiring from baseball, Blue resided in California's Twain Harte area in the Sierra Nevada foothills for many years, before moving to Tracy, California by 2007.

Blue died in a hospital in the East Bay on May 6, 2023, at the age of 73. According to Athletics team officials, Blue died as a result of medical complications stemming from cancer.

== See also ==
- Bay Area Sports Hall of Fame
- Black Aces, African-American pitchers with a 20-win MLB season
- List of Major League Baseball career wins leaders
- List of Major League Baseball annual ERA leaders
- List of Major League Baseball career strikeout leaders

Awards and achievements
Preceded by Bill Singer	No-hitter pitcher September 21, 1970	Succeeded by Ken Holtzman
Preceded by Ed Halicki	No-hit game September 28, 1975 (with Abbott, Lindblad & Fingers)	Succeeded by Larry Dierker
