= Craig Minetto =

American baseball player (born 1954)

- Pitcher
- Born: April 25, 1954 (age 71); Stockton, California, U.S.
- Batted: Left Threw: Left

MLB debut
- July 4, 1978, for the Oakland Athletics

Last MLB appearance
- May 15, 1981, for the Oakland Athletics

MLB statistics
- Win–loss record: 1–7
- Earned run average: 5.40
- Strikeouts: 76
- Stats at Baseball Reference

Teams
- Oakland Athletics (1978–1981)

Craig Stephen Minetto (born April 25, 1954) is an American former professional baseball pitcher. Minetto pitched in parts of four seasons in Major League Baseball from 1978 until 1981 for the Oakland Athletics.

== Career ==
Originally drafted by the Los Angeles Dodgers in 1972, and again in the secondary phase in 1973, Minetto did not sign. Instead, he attended San Joaquin Delta College for two years. He was then signed as an amateur free agent by the Montreal Expos in 1974, but he pitched one season in their farm system before being released.

Unable to find a job in American baseball, Minetto signed with the Fortitudo Baseball Bologna, a professional team based in Bologna, Italy and sponsored by Grappa del Cannonier. He pitched there for a season, and later returned to the United States, where he was signed to a minor league contract by the Athletics before the 1977 season.

Minetto went on to pitch in 55 games for Oakland over four seasons, then was traded to the Baltimore Orioles organization, pitching with their affiliate Rochester Red Wings from 1982 to 1983. In December 1983, he was traded to the Houston Astros for Bobby Sprowl and concluded his career at AAA Tucson Toros in the 1984 season.

In between, Minetto played winter ball with the Tiburones de La Guaira club of the Venezuelan Professional Baseball League during the 1978–1979 season.

== Sources ==
- Career statistics from Baseball Reference · Baseball Reference (Minors) · Retrosheet · Baseball Almanac, or Retrosheet
