= Gary Thomasson =

American baseball player (born 1951)

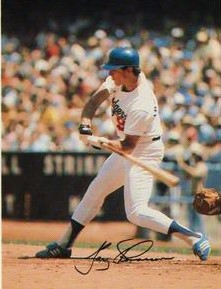
- Outfielder / First baseman
- Born: July 29, 1951 (age 74); San Diego, California, U.S.
- Batted: Left Threw: Left

MLB debut
- September 5, 1972, for the San Francisco Giants

Last MLB appearance
- October 6, 1980, for the Los Angeles Dodgers

MLB statistics
- Batting average: .249
- Home runs: 61
- Runs batted in: 294
- Stats at Baseball Reference

Teams
- San Francisco Giants (1972–1977); Oakland Athletics (1978); New York Yankees (1978); Los Angeles Dodgers (1979–1980); Yomiuri Giants (1981–1982)

Career highlights and awards
- World Series champion (1978)

Gary Leah Thomasson (born July 29, 1951) is an American former professional baseball player. He played as an outfielder and first baseman in Major League Baseball (MLB) between 1972 and 1980, most prominently as a member of the San Francisco Giants with whom he played for seven seasons. He also played for the Los Angeles Dodgers, New York Yankees, and Oakland Athletics. After his Major League Baseball career ended, Thomasson played for the Yomiuri Giants of the Japanese Nippon Pro Baseball league, in 1981 and 1982. Thomasson was a member of the Yankees' 1978 World Series winning team over the Dodgers.

== Career ==
Thomasson attended Oceanside High School in Oceanside, California and was drafted by the San Francisco Giants in the 7th round of the 1969 Major League Baseball draft. He made his Major League debut on September 5, 1972, at the age of 21, pinch-hitting for pitcher Frank Reberger in a 4–3 Giants' win over the San Diego Padres. In 1973, his first full Major League season, Thomasson hit .285 in 112 games.

Thomasson was traded along with Gary Alexander, Dave Heaverlo, John Henry Johnson, Phil Huffman, Alan Wirth and $300,000 from the Giants to the Athletics for Vida Blue on March 15, 1978. Mario Guerrero was sent to the Athletics just over three weeks later on April 7 to complete the transaction.

Thomasson spent only a few months and 47 games with Oakland before being traded to the New York Yankees for Dell Alston, Mickey Klutts, and $50,000, on June 15, 1978. Eight months later he was on the move again, dealt to the Los Angeles Dodgers for catcher Brad Gulden on February 15, 1979.

Purchased from the Dodgers by the Yomiuri Giants of Japanese Nippon Pro Baseball on December 22, 1980, Thomasson spent his final two professional seasons (1981–82) in Japan. Signed with great fanfare to the biggest contract ever given to a player in the Nippon league, Thomasson was a disappointment in his two years in Japan, coming close to setting the league strikeout record before a knee injury ended his career.

Tokyo writer and conceptual artist Genpei Akasegawa published a book containing photographs of found objects which he termed "Hyperart Thomasson". The book enjoyed a cult following among late-1980s Japanese youth.
