= Dave Heaverlo =

American baseball player (born 1950)

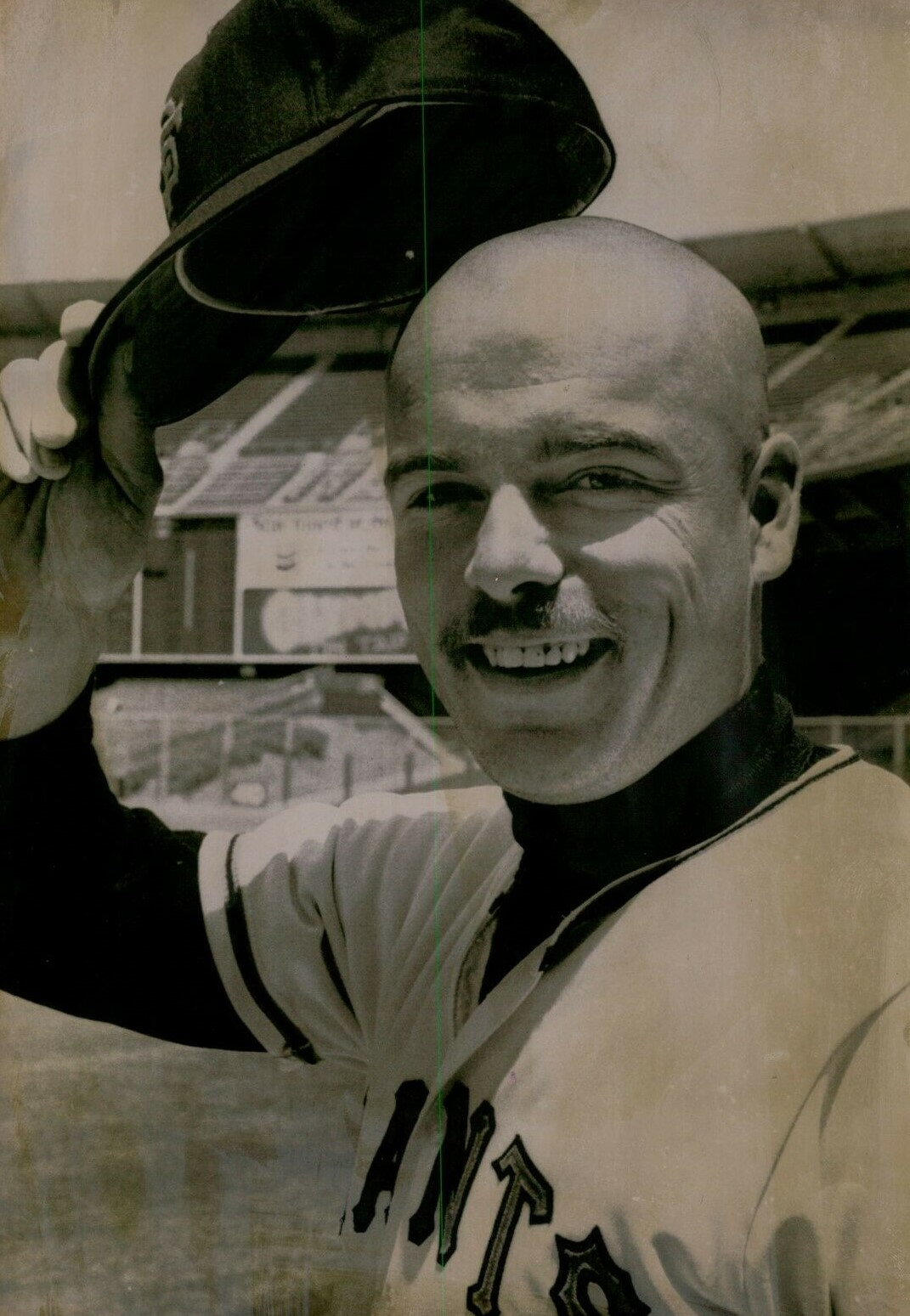
- Relief pitcher
- Born: August 25, 1950 (age 75); Ellensburg, Washington, U.S.
- Batted: Right Threw: Right

MLB debut
- April 14, 1975, for the San Francisco Giants

Last MLB appearance
- September 27, 1981, for the Oakland Athletics

MLB statistics
- Win–loss record: 26–26
- Earned run average: 3.41
- Strikeouts: 288
- Stats at Baseball Reference

Teams
- San Francisco Giants (1975–1977); Oakland Athletics (1978–1979); Seattle Mariners (1980); Oakland Athletics (1981)

David Wallace Heaverlo (/ˈhævərloʊ/ HAV-er-loh; born August 25, 1950) is an American former right-handed Major League Baseball relief pitcher. His out pitch was a forkball. He is noted for shaving his head at a time when it wasn't popular and wearing a uniform number usually assigned to players not expected to make the major leagues coming out of spring training.

Heaverlo attended Moses Lake High School in Moses Lake, Washington, graduating in 1968. He then went on to Central Washington University, in Ellensburg, Washington, where he graduated in 1973. He is a member of the athletics hall of fame at both his high school and university.

Heaverlo pitched for the San Francisco Giants, the Oakland Athletics, and the Seattle Mariners. He made his major league debut on April 14, 1975 for the Giants and pitched his last game on September 27, 1981 for the Athletics. He earned a reputation as a jokester. He shaved his head because he couldn't stand the Arizona heat in spring training and insisted on keeping his non-roster uniform number 60 so he didn't have to change it on his glove or cleats. His bald head earned him the nickname Kojak after the television detective played by Telly Savalas.

After going 5–1 with a 2.55 ERA in 1977, he along with Gary Thomasson, Gary Alexander, John Henry Johnson, Phil Huffman, Alan Wirth and $300,000 was traded from the Giants to the Athletics for Vida Blue on March 15, 1978. Mario Guerrero was sent to the Athletics just over three weeks later on April 7 to complete the transaction.

In his career, Heaverlo made 356 major league appearances, all as a relief pitcher. He pitched 537 career innings and earned 26 saves with a 3.41 ERA.

Heaverlo now works as the pitching coach for the Big Bend Vikings in Moses Lake. He also hosts a radio talk show.

Heaverlo's son, Jeff, pitched in the minor leagues in the Seattle Mariners and Los Angeles Angels of Anaheim organizations.
