= Ogden A's =

- 1979–1980; Ogden, Utah

Minor league affiliations
- Class: Triple-A (1979–1980)
- League: Pacific Coast League (1979–1980)
- Division: Southern Division

Major league affiliations
- Team: Oakland Athletics (1979–1980)

Team data
- Name: Ogden A's (1979–1980)
- Ballpark: John Affleck Park (1979–1980)

The Ogden A's were a minor league baseball team in the Pacific Coast League, based in Ogden, Utah. They were the Triple-A farm club of the Oakland Athletics, and replaced the San Jose Missions as the tenth team in the PCL.

The Ogden A's existed for only two seasons, 1979 and 1980, with José Pagán as the field manager. In 1979, hall of famer Rickey Henderson played in 71 games for the Ogden A's, until his major league debut in late June.

Purchased by Peter Pocklington, owner of the NHL's Edmonton Oilers, the club moved to Edmonton, Alberta, Canada, and were the Edmonton Trappers for 24 seasons (1981–2004). Nolan Ryan bought the team and moved it to Texas in 2005; now the Round Rock Express, they are based in Round Rock, a suburb north of Austin.

In Ogden, the A's played at John Affleck Park on South Wall Avenue (41.201°N 111.981°W), later demolished for commercial developments. The field was aligned northwest at an elevation of 4,320 feet (1,320 m) above sea level.
