= John Henry Johnson (baseball) =

American baseball player (born 1956)

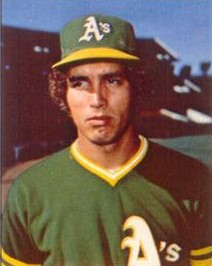
- Pitcher
- Born: August 21, 1956 (age 69); Houston, Texas, U.S.
- Batted: Left Threw: Left

MLB debut
- April 10, 1978, for the Oakland Athletics

Last MLB appearance
- June 29, 1987, for the Milwaukee Brewers

MLB statistics
- Win–loss record: 26–33
- Earned run average: 3.90
- Strikeouts: 407
- Stats at Baseball Reference

Teams
- Oakland Athletics (1978–1979); Texas Rangers (1979–1981); Boston Red Sox (1983–1984); Milwaukee Brewers (1986–1987)

John Henry Johnson (born August 21, 1956) is an American former Major League Baseball player. He was drafted by the San Francisco Giants in the 15th round of the 1974 amateur draft. He made his major league debut after being traded along with Gary Thomasson, Gary Alexander, Dave Heaverlo, Phil Huffman, Alan Wirth and $300,000 from the Giants to the Oakland Athletics for Vida Blue on March 15, 1978. Mario Guerrero was sent to the Athletics on April 7 to complete the transaction.

From 1979 through 1981, Johnson played for the Texas Rangers. He then pitched for the Boston Red Sox before ending his career with the Milwaukee Brewers.
