= 1979 Toronto Blue Jays season =

1979 Toronto Blue Jays
- League: American League
- Division: East
- Ballpark: Exhibition Stadium
- City: Toronto
- Record: 53–109 (.327)
- Divisional place: 7th
- Owners: Labatt Breweries, Imperial Trust, Canadian Imperial Bank of Commerce
- General managers: Pat Gillick
- Managers: Roy Hartsfield
- Television: CBC Television (Don Chevrier, Tony Kubek, Tom McKee); CBFT (Jean-Pierre Roy, Guy Ferron)
- Radio: CKFH (Early Wynn, Tom Cheek)

The 1979 Toronto Blue Jays season was the franchise's third season of Major League Baseball. It resulted in the Blue Jays finishing seventh in the American League East with a record of 53 wins and 109 losses. The Blue Jays were the only American League East team to finish 1979 with a losing record and the loss total of 109 set the franchise mark; it is also the last time as of 2025 the Blue Jays lost over 100 games in a season. Attendance for the season decreased to 1,431,651.

== Offseason ==
=== Transactions ===
Transactions by the Toronto Blue Jays during the off-season before the 1979 season.

==== October 1978 ====
October 3	Purchased Rico Carty from the Oakland Athletics.

==== November 1978 ====
November 2	Joe Coleman granted free agency. Rico Carty granted free agency.
November 3	Acquired Dave Freisleben from the Cleveland Indians for a player to be named later (Sheldon Mallory on March 27, 1979).
November 24	Signed amateur free agent Fred Manrique. Signed amateur free agent Toby Hernández.
November 27	Signed amateur free agent José Escobar. Acquired Joe Cannon, Pedro Hernández and Mark Lemongello from the Houston Astros for Alan Ashby.

==== December 1978 ====
December 2	Willie Horton became a free agent. Released Bill Singer.
December 4	Acquired Don Pisker from the Houston Astros for Gary Woods. Selected Bob Davis from the San Diego Padres in the 1978 MLB Rule 5 draft. Selected Ted Wilborn from the New York Yankees in the 1978 MLB Rule 5 draft.
December 5	Acquired Alfredo Griffin and Phil Lansford from the Cleveland Indians for Víctor Cruz.

==== January 1979 ====
January 1	Signed amateur free agent Luis Leal.
January 4	Signed free agent Chuck Scrivener of the Detroit Tigers to a contract.
January 11	Signed free agent Rico Carty to a multi-year contract.
January 23	Player rights of Sam Ewing sold to Nippon-Ham Fighters of the Nippon Professional Baseball.

==== March 1979 ====
March 17	Signed free agent Steve Luebber of the Chicago White Sox to a contract.
March 25	Claimed Bobby Brown off of waivers from the New York Mets.
March 29	Released Jeff Byrd. Released Don Kirkwood.

== Regular season ==
Following the team's poor performance, manager Roy Hartsfield was fired at the end of the season. One highlight of the season was the awarding of the American League Rookie of the Year Award to Alfredo Griffin.

The end of the 1979 season marked a crossroads for the franchise. The first real talent from the minor leagues had made it to the major league roster. Such talent included pitcher Dave Stieb and third baseman Danny Ainge.

=== Season standings ===
AL East
Team	W	L	Pct.	GB	Home	Road
Baltimore Orioles	102	57	.642	—	55‍–‍24	47‍–‍33
Milwaukee Brewers	95	66	.590	8	52‍–‍29	43‍–‍37
Boston Red Sox	91	69	.569	11½	51‍–‍29	40‍–‍40
New York Yankees	89	71	.556	13½	51‍–‍30	38‍–‍41
Detroit Tigers	85	76	.528	18	46‍–‍34	39‍–‍42
Cleveland Indians	81	80	.503	22	47‍–‍34	34‍–‍46
Toronto Blue Jays	53	109	.327	50½	32‍–‍49	21‍–‍60

=== Record vs. opponents ===
1979 American League record Sources:
Team	BAL	BOS	CAL	CWS	CLE	DET	KC	MIL	MIN	NYY	OAK	SEA	TEX	TOR
Baltimore	—	8–5	9–3	8–3	8–5	7–6	6–6	8–5	8–4	5–6	8–4	10–2	6–6	11–2
Boston	5–8	—	5–7	5–6	6–7	8–5	8–4	8–4	9–3	5–8	9–3	8–4	6–6	9–4
California	3–9	7–5	—	9–4	6–6	4–8	7–6	7–5	9–4	7–5	10–3	7–6	5–8	7–5
Chicago	3–8	6–5	4–9	—	6–6	3–9	5–8	5–7	5–8	4–8	9–4	5–8	11–2	7–5
Cleveland	5–8	7–6	6–6	6–6	—	6–6	6–6	4–9	8–4	5–8	8–4	7–5	5–7	8–5
Detroit	6–7	5–8	8–4	9–3	6–6	—	5–7	6–7	4–8	7–6	7–5	7–5	6–6	9–4
Kansas City	6–6	4–8	6–7	8–5	6–6	7–5	—	5–7	7–6	5–7	9–4	7–6	6–7	9–3
Milwaukee	5–8	4–8	5–7	7–5	9–4	7–6	7–5	—	8–4	9–4	6–6	9–3	9–3	10–3
Minnesota	4–8	3–9	4–9	8–5	4–8	8–4	6–7	4–8	—	7–5	9–4	10–3	4–9	11–1
New York	6–5	8–5	5–7	8–4	8–5	6–7	7–5	4–9	5–7	—	9–3	6–6	8–4	9–4
Oakland	4–8	3–9	3–10	4–9	4–8	5–7	4–9	6–6	4–9	3–9	—	8–5	2–11	4–8
Seattle	2–10	4–8	6–7	8–5	5–7	5–7	6–7	3–9	3–10	6–6	5–8	—	6–7	8–4
Texas	6–6	6–6	8–5	2–11	7–5	6–6	7–6	3–9	9–4	4–8	11–2	7–6	—	7–5
Toronto	2–11	4–9	5–7	5–7	5–8	4–9	3–9	3–10	1–11	4–9	8–4	4–8	5–7	—

=== Opening Day starters ===
- Bob Bailor
- Rick Bosetti
- Rico Carty
- Rick Cerone
- Jim Clancy
- Alfredo Griffin
- Roy Howell
- John Mayberry
- Dave McKay
- Alvis Woods

=== Transactions ===
Transactions for the Toronto Blue Jays during the 1979 regular season.

==== April 1979 ====
April 6	Signed free agent Mike Sember from the Chicago Cubs to a contract.
April 7	Player rights of Mike Stanton sold to the Petroleros de Zulia of the Inter-American League.
April 13	Signed free agent Jackson Todd from the Philadelphia Phillies to a contract.
April 19	Player rights of Bobby Brown sold to the New York Yankees.
April 23	Signed free agent Bob Robertson from the Seattle Mariners to a contract.
April 24	Signed amateur free agent Tony Fernández to a contract.

==== May 1979 ====
May 12	Released Tom Murphy.

==== June 1979 ====
June 6	Purchased Dyar Miller from the California Angels.
June 22	Signed amateur free agent Steve Senteney to a contract.
June 27	Released Bob Robertson.

==== July 1979 ====
July 25	Purchased Craig Kusick from the Minnesota Twins.
July 30	Acquired Tony Solaita from the Montreal Expos for a player to be named later (Dyar Miller on October 24, 1979).

==== Draft picks ====
- June 5, 1979: 1979 Major League Baseball draft
  - Future NFL quarterback Jay Schroeder was drafted by the Toronto Blue Jays in the 1st round, but did not sign.
  - Ron Shepherd was drafted by the Blue Jays in the 2nd round.
  - Ron Romanick was drafted by the Blue Jays in the 3rd round, but did not sign.
  - Andre Robertson was drafted by the Blue Jays in the 4th round.

=== Roster ===
1979 Toronto Blue Jays
Roster
Pitchers: 44 Tom Buskey; 18 Jim Clancy; 16 Butch Edge; 25 Dave Freisleben; 36 Jerry Garvin; 45 Steve Grilli; 47 Phil Huffman; 34 Jesse Jefferson; 23 Dave Lemanczyk; 40 Mark Lemongello; 46 Steve Luebber; 46 Dyar Miller; 38 Balor Moore; 45 Tom Murphy; 37 Dave Stieb; 32 Jackson Todd; 24 Tom Underwood; 33 Mike Willis	Catchers: 9 Rick Cerone; 8 Bob Davis; Infielders: 2 Danny Ainge; 11 Luis Gómez; 4 Alfredo Griffin; 13 Roy Howell; 17 Tim Johnson; 5 Craig Kusick; 10 John Mayberry; 39 Dave McKay; 5 Bob Robertson; 27 Tony Solaita	Outfielders: 1 Bob Bailor; 22 Rick Bosetti; 5 Bobby Brown; 30 Joe Cannon; 19 Otto Vélez; 35 Ted Wilborn; 20 Alvis Woods; Other batters: 21 Rico Carty; 29 Pedro Hernández	Manager: 7 Roy Hartsfield; Coaches: 31 Bobby Doerr (Hitting); 43 Don Leppert (First Base); 15 Bob Miller (Pitching); 42 Jackie Moore (Third Base); 41 Harry Warner (Bullpen)

=== Game log ===
1979 Game Log 53–109 (Home 32–49, Away 21–60)
April: 7–15 (Home 3–8, Away 4–7)

#	Date	Opponent	Score	Win	Loss	Save	Attendance	Record
1	April 5	@ Royals	2–11	Leonard (1–0)	Underwood (0–1)	Mingori (1)	37,754	0–1
2	April 7	@ Royals	4–7	Gura (1–0)	Clancy (0–1)	Hrabosky (1)	21,850	0–2
3	April 8	@ Royals	3–8	Splittorff (1–0)	Lemongello (0–1)		23,477	0–3
4	April 10	@ White Sox	10–2	Huffman (1–0)	Kravec (0–2)	Freisleben (1)	41,043	1–3
–	April 11	@ White Sox	Postponed (rain) Rescheduled for April 12					
5	April 12	@ White Sox	9–7	Murphy (1–0)	LaGrow (0–1)		1,205	2–3
6	April 13	Royals	4–1 (6)	Clancy (1–1)	Splittorff (1–1)		40,035	3–3
7	April 14	Royals	8–6	Freisleben (1–0)	Leonard (1–1)		11,683	4–3
8	April 15	Royals	10–12	Rodríguez (2–0)	Murphy (1–1)	Hrabosky (2)	12,287	4–4
9	April 16	White Sox	4–8	Scarbery (1–0)	Murphy (1–2)	Proly (1)	11,211	4–5
10	April 17	White Sox	1–6	Barrios (1–0)	Underwood (0–2)	Proly (2)	10,074	4–6
11	April 18	White Sox	5–12	Wortham (3–0)	Clancy (1–2)		10,478	4–7
12	April 20	@ Tigers	2–7	Wilcox (2–0)	Lemongello (0–2)		13,617	4–8
13	April 21	@ Tigers	5–4	Huffman (2–0)	Billingham (1–1)	Freisleben (2)	10,904	5–8
14	April 22	@ Tigers	1–4	Rozema (1–1)	Underwood (0–3)		14,543	5–9
15	April 23	@ Rangers	0–5	Alexander (1–0)	Clancy (1–3)	Kern (2)	12,661	5–10
16	April 24	@ Rangers	2–0	Lemanczyk (1–0)	Comer (1–2)		14,411	6–10
17	April 25	@ Rangers	3–4 (10)	Lyle (2–1)	Jefferson (0–1)		15,731	6–11
18	April 27	Brewers	5–8	Sorensen (3–2)	Huffman (2–1)	McClure (1)	10,306	6–12
19	April 28	Brewers	8–11 (10)	McClure (3–0)	Willis (0–1)		12,683	6–13
20	April 29	Brewers	0–3	Caldwell (4–1)	Clancy (1–4)			6–14
21	April 29	Brewers	5–3	Lemanczyk (2–0)	Travers (0–2)		16,083	7–14
22	April 30	Twins	3–6	Hartzell (1–0)	Lemongello (0–3)		10,170	7–15

May: 5–23 (Home 3–15, Away 2–8)

#	Date	Opponent	Score	Win	Loss	Save	Attendance	Record
23	May 1	Twins	2–3	Koosman (5–0)	Jefferson (0–2)	Marshall (8)	10,155	7–16
24	May 2	Twins	5–7	Goltz (3–3)	Huffman (2–2)	Marshall (9)	20,110	7–17
25	May 3	@ Brewers	4–5	Travers (1–2)	Underwood (0–4)		7,801	7–18
26	May 4	@ Brewers	5–4	Clancy (2–4)	Caldwell (4–2)	Freisleben (3)	28,896	8–18
27	May 5	@ Brewers	1–6	Slaton (3–1)	Lemanczyk (2–1)		14,910	8–19
28	May 6	@ Brewers	0–4	Sorensen (4–3)	Lemongello (0–4)		53,962	8–20
29	May 7	@ Twins	1–6	Goltz (4–3)	Huffman (2–3)		4,571	8–21
30	May 8	@ Twins	6–16	Bacsik (1–0)	Willis (0–2)		3,126	8–22
–	May 9	@ Twins	Postponed (rain) Rescheduled for July 21					
31	May 11	Rangers	1–3	Matlack (1–2)	Clancy (2–5)		12,153	8–23
32	May 12	Rangers	1–3	Comer (3–3)	Lemanczyk (2–2)	Lyle (5)	14,109	8–24
33	May 13	Rangers	3–1	Lemongello (1–4)	Alexander (1–2)			9–24
34	May 13	Rangers	5–7	Farmer (2–0)	Huffman (2–4)	Lyle (6)	16,531	9–25
35	May 14	@ Indians	0–1	Waits (4–3)	Underwood (0–5)		3,867	9–26
36	May 15	@ Indians	3–5	Monge (2–3)	Garvin (0–1)		3,978	9–27
37	May 16	@ Indians	4–3	Lemanczyk (3–2)	Wise (3–4)		4,079	10–27
38	May 17	@ Indians	3–8	Paxton (3–2)	Lemongello (1–5)		4,409	10–28
39	May 18	Orioles	6–7 (11)	Stanhouse (3–1)	Freisleben (1–1)		12,088	10–29
40	May 19	Orioles	3–4	Palmer (5–2)	Underwood (0–6)	Stanhouse (4)	18,144	10–30
41	May 20	Orioles	2–6	Martínez (6–2)	Jefferson (0–3)		30,065	10–31
42	May 21	Indians	8–1	Lemanczyk (4–2)	Wise (3–5)		12,260	11–31
43	May 22	Indians	6–8	Wilkins (2–2)	Lemongello (1–6)	Monge (5)	10,182	11–32
44	May 23	Indians	3–4	Garland (2–4)	Freisleben (1–2)		20,283	11–33
–	May 25	Red Sox	Postponed (rain) Rescheduled for September 17					
45	May 26	Red Sox	7–6	Buskey (1–0)	Campbell (2–2)		31,590	12–33
46	May 27	Red Sox	0–1	Rainey (3–2)	Jefferson (0–4)		33,556	12–34
47	May 28	Tigers	2–6	Morris (2–1)	Lemanczyk (4–3)		10,740	12–35
48	May 29	Tigers	8–9	Tobik (1–0)	Buskey (1–1)	Hiller (3)	11,449	12–36
49	May 30	Tigers	2–8	Wilcox (4–2)	Huffman (2–5)		21,359	12–37
50	May 31	Tigers	0–1	Underwood (1–0)	Underwood (0–7)	Hiller (4)	12,423	12–38

June: 12–18 (Home 6–5, Away 6–13)

#	Date	Opponent	Score	Win	Loss	Save	Attendance	Record
51	June 1	@ Mariners	2–7	Mitchell (1–4)	Jefferson (0–5)		4,113	12–39
52	June 2	@ Mariners	6–2	Lemanczyk (5–3)	Jones (0–6)		8,011	13–39
53	June 3	@ Mariners	5–10	Parrott (3–1)	Lemongello (1–7)		4,436	13–40
54	June 4	@ Angels	2–4	Barlow (1–1)	Huffman (2–6)	Clear (5)	16,979	13–41
55	June 5	@ Angels	0–3	Tanana (5–3)	Underwood (0–8)		18,862	13–42
56	June 6	@ Angels	5–4	Jefferson (1–5)	LaRoche (2–5)		18,835	14–42
57	June 8	@ Athletics	2–1	Buskey (2–1)	Heaverlo (2–6)		2,022	15–42
58	June 9	@ Athletics	5–0	Huffman (3–6)	Keough (0–8)		1,725	16–42
59	June 10	@ Athletics	1–12	Hamilton (2–0)	Underwood (0–9)		2,400	16–43
60	June 11	Mariners	2–0	Lemanczyk (6–3)	Bannister (3–6)		10,213	17–43
61	June 12	Mariners	1–5	Abbott (3–7)	Jefferson (1–6)		12,056	17–44
62	June 13	Angels	9–8	Freisleben (2–2)	LaRoche (2–6)			18–44
63	June 13	Angels	2–10	Aase (6–4)	Willis (0–3)		28,577	18–45
64	June 14	Angels	2–10	Ryan (8–3)	Huffman (3–7)		15,097	18–46
65	June 15	Athletics	6–0	Underwood (1–9)	Hamilton (2–1)		13,124	19–46
66	June 16	Athletics	3–2	Lemanczyk (7–3)	McCatty (4–2)		19,270	20–46
67	June 17	Athletics	10–9	Buskey (3–1)	Heaverlo (2–7)		25,518	21–46
68	June 19	@ Yankees	5–4	Huffman (4–7)	John (10–3)	Buskey (1)	36,211	22–46
69	June 20	@ Yankees	1–2	Hood (2–0)	Underwood (1–10)	Davis (1)		22–47
70	June 20	@ Yankees	3–2	Moore (1–0)	Burris (1–3)		32,129	23–47
71	June 21	@ Yankees	1–3	Tiant (3–2)	Lemanczyk (7–4)	Davis (2)	19,278	23–48
72	June 22	@ Red Sox	1–12	Rainey (5–4)	Jefferson (1–7)	Burgeier (2)	31,089	23–49
73	June 23	@ Red Sox	3–4 (11)	Drago (6–3)	Buskey (3–2)		34,130	23–50
74	June 24	@ Red Sox	4–8	Torrez (8–4)	Huffman (4–8)		33,560	23–51
75	June 25	Yankees	3–1	Underwood (2–10)	Clay (1–3)		37,612	24–51
76	June 26	Yankees	2–11	Tiant (4–2)	Lemanczyk (7–5)		38,696	24–52
77	June 28	Yankees	3–5 (10)	Davis (6–0)	Lemongello (1–8)		39,347	24–53
78	June 29	@ Orioles	1–6	McGregor (2–2)	Stieb (0–1)			24–54
79	June 29	@ Orioles	0–4	Stone (6–5)	Huffman (4–9)	Stanhouse (9)	20,872	24–55
80	June 30	@ Orioles	0–2	Flanagan (10–5)	Underwood (2–11)		19,807	24–56

July: 8–18 (Home 5–6, Away 3–12)

#	Date	Opponent	Score	Win	Loss	Save	Attendance	Record
81	July 1	@ Orioles	7–10	Stewart (5–2)	Jefferson (1–8)	Stanhouse (10)	33,592	24–57
82	July 3	@ Tigers	9–1	Moore (2–0)	Billingham (7–5)		20,885	25–57
83	July 4	@ Tigers	7–6 (11)	Buskey (4–2)	Tobik (1–4)		13,772	26–57
84	July 5	@ Tigers	2–3	Young (2–1)	Huffman (4–10)	López (2)	13,199	26–58
85	July 6	@ Rangers	5–1	Underwood (3–11)	Johnson (4–9)	Buskey (2)	19,539	27–58
86	July 7	@ Rangers	0–2	Medich (2–3)	Lemanczyk (7–6)	Kern (15)	23,935	27–59
87	July 8	@ Rangers	3–4	Comer (9–6)	Moore (2–1)	Lyle (9)	17,489	27–60
88	July 9	Brewers	7–1	Stieb (1–1)	Sorensen (10–9)		14,240	28–60
89	July 11	Brewers	1–2 (10)	Slaton (9–4)	Buskey (4–3)		22,523	28–61
90	July 12	Brewers	3–5	Haas (6–6)	Underwood (3–12)	Galasso (1)	14,207	28–62
91	July 13	Twins	4–6	Goltz (8–6)	Lemanczyk (7–7)	Marshall (18)	14,095	28–63
92	July 14	Twins	4–2	Stieb (2–1)	Koosman (11–7)		19,187	29–63
93	July 15	Twins	4–9	Zahn (8–2)	Clancy (2–6)		19,069	29–64
94	July 19	@ Brewers	2–3 (11)	Castro (3–0)	Buskey (4–4)		21,152	29–65
95	July 20	@ Brewers	0–2	Slaton (10–4)	Underwood (3–13)		27,010	29–66
96	July 21	@ Twins	4–6	Goltz (9–6)	Huffman (4–11)	Marshall (19)		29–67
97	July 21	@ Twins	3–4	Hartzell (5–6)	Moore (2–2)		12,887	29–68
98	July 22	@ Twins	1–13	Redfern (5–0)	Lemanczyk (7–8)		18,927	29–69
99	July 23	@ Twins	6–7	Marshall (10–9)	Lemongello (1–9)		7,482	29–70
100	July 25	Rangers	8–3	Stieb (3–1)	Johnson (4–12)	Buskey (3)	24,705	30–70
101	July 26	Rangers	8–4	Underwood (4–13)	Medich (4–4)		14,605	31–70
102	July 27	Tigers	3–4 (11)	López (5–2)	Buskey (4–5)		23,814	31–71
103	July 28	Tigers	3–0	Lemanczyk (8–8)	Robbins (0–1)		30,131	32–71
104	July 29	Tigers	4–5	Underwood (6–1)	Clancy (2–7)	López (8)	33,824	32–72
105	July 30	@ Royals	0–9	Gura (7–7)	Stieb (3–2)		31,572	32–73
106	July 31	@ Royals	5–6	Pattin (4–2)	Jefferson (1–9)	Hrabosky (9)	22,156	32–74

August: 11–17 (Home 6–8, Away 5–9)

#	Date	Opponent	Score	Win	Loss	Save	Attendance	Record
107	August 1	@ Royals	3–4	Gale (9–8)	Huffman (4–12)	Hrabosky (10)	24,077	32–75
108	August 3	White Sox	5–8	Trout (6–4)	Moore (2–3)	Farmer (5)	14,232	32–76
109	August 4	White Sox	5–2	Buskey (5–5)	Wortham (11–11)		15,130	33–76
110	August 5	White Sox	4–5	Kravec (10–10)	Lemanczyk (8–9)	Farmer (6)	21,203	33–77
111	August 6	Royals	12–16	Mingori (3–2)	Stieb (3–3)		15,108	33–78
112	August 7	Royals	3–2	Underwood (5–13)	Splittorff (10–12)		23,779	34–78
113	August 9	Royals	3–10	Gura (8–8)	Huffman (4–13)		20,102	34–79
–	August 10	@ White Sox	Postponed (rain) Rescheduled for August 11					
114	August 11	@ White Sox	1–6	Kravec (11–10)	Todd (0–1)	Farmer (8)		34–80
115	August 11	@ White Sox	6–0	Stieb (4–3)	Scarbery (2–7)		19,420	35–80
116	August 12	@ White Sox	0–7	Baumgarten (10–7)	Underwood (5–14)			35–81
117	August 12	@ White Sox	7–5	Moore (3–3)	Proly (1–4)	Buskey (4)	14,712	36–81
118	August 13	@ Athletics	4–2	Edge (1–0)	Norris (3–5)	Buskey (5)	3,183	37–81
119	August 14	@ Athletics	6–2	Huffman (5–13)	Minetto (1–4)		1,289	38–81
120	August 15	@ Athletics	1–3	Kingman (3–4)	Jefferson (1–10)	Heaverlo (9)	2,151	38–82
121	August 17	@ Angels	6–5	Stieb (5–3)	Clear (10–4)		25,050	39–82
122	August 18	@ Angels	5–7	Ryan (13–8)	Underwood (5–15)	Clear (13)	30,361	39–83
123	August 19	@ Angels	2–4	Aase (9–8)	Moore (3–4)		23,814	39–84
124	August 20	@ Mariners	4–7	Parrott (11–8)	Edge (1–1)		5,642	39–85
125	August 21	@ Mariners	4–8	Montague (6–4)	Huffman (5–14)	McLaughlin (11)	8,376	39–86
126	August 22	@ Mariners	3–6	Honeycutt (9–9)	Stieb (5–4)		7,365	39–87
127	August 24	Angels	6–4	Underwood (6–15)	Knapp (3–3)	Buskey (6)	18,077	40–87
128	August 25	Angels	2–24	Frost (13–8)	Moore (3–5)		25,207	40–88
129	August 26	Angels	9–3	Edge (2–1)	Ryan (13–10)		22,619	41–88
130	August 27	Athletics	7–0	Huffman (6–14)	McCatty (8–9)		12,047	42–88
131	August 28	Athletics	3–6	Langford (10–13)	Stieb (5–5)		21,736	42–89
132	August 29	Athletics	4–6	Norris (5–6)	Underwood (6–16)		13,071	42–90
133	August 30	Mariners	2–8	Parrott (13–8)	Moore (3–6)		11,850	42–91
134	August 31	Mariners	5–4 (11)	Buskey (6–5)	McLaughlin (6–5)		11,254	43–91

September: 10–18 (Home 9–7, Away 1–11)

#	Date	Opponent	Score	Win	Loss	Save	Attendance	Record
135	September 1	Mariners	2–3 (10)	Honeycutt (10–9)	Buskey (6–6)		23,139	43–92
136	September 2	Mariners	8–5	Stieb (6–5)	Twitchell (0–2)	Jefferson (1)	14,776	44–92
137	September 3	@ Orioles	1–2 (11)	Martinez (9–2)	Buskey (6–7)			44–93
138	September 3	@ Orioles	1–5	Flanagan (20–7)	Lemanczyk (8–10)		20,432	44–94
–	September 5	@ Orioles	Postponed (rain) Rescheduled for September 6					
139	September 6	@ Orioles	0–5	Martínez (15–12)	Edge (2–2)		7,053	44–95
140	September 7	@ Indians	8–9	Reuschel (2–1)	Buskey (6–8)		4,222	44–96
141	September 8	@ Indians	4–5	Wise (15–7)	Stieb (6–6)		4,439	44–97
142	September 9	@ Indians	10–14	Monge (9–9)	Buskey (6–9)		9,166	44–98
143	September 11	Orioles	3–1	Underwood (7–16)	McGregor (11–5)		12,092	45–98
144	September 12	Orioles	3–2	Edge (3–2)	Palmer (8–6)		21,213	46–98
145	September 13	Orioles	4–10	Flanagan (22–7)	Huffman (6–15)		11,080	46–99
146	September 14	Indians	4–3	Stieb (7–6)	Wise (15–8)		11,010	47–99
147	September 15	Indians	5–2	Moore (4–6)	Barker (6–5)		12,160	48–99
148	September 16	Indians	8–2	Underwood (8–16)	Garland (4–10)		17,078	49–99
149	September 17	Red Sox	5–4	Jefferson (2–10)	Drago (9–6)			50–99
150	September 17	Red Sox	3–5	Rainey (7–5)	Freisleben (2–3)	Campbell (9)	15,644	50–100
151	September 18	Red Sox	3–8	Torrez (15–12)	Huffman (6–16)		13,208	50–101
152	September 19	Red Sox	0–8	Stanley (16–10)	Stieb (7–7)		21,650	50–102
153	September 20	Red Sox	6–2	Moore (5–6)	Renko (10–9)		13,201	51–102
154	September 21	Yankees	3–2	Underwood (9–16)	Guidry (17–8)	Buskey (7)	22,331	52–102
155	September 22	Yankees	4–7	Tiant (12–8)	Edge (3–3)	Gossage (16)	37,408	52–103
156	September 23	Yankees	5–7	John (20–9)	Huffman (6–17)	Gossage (17)	28,137	52–104
157	September 25	@ Red Sox	5–3	Stieb (8–7)	Stanley (16–11)		18,929	53–104
158	September 26	@ Red Sox	4–6	Rainey (8–5)	Moore (5–7)	Drago (12)	18,010	53–105
159	September 27	@ Red Sox	5–6	Drago (10–6)	Buskey (6–10)		20,853	53–106
160	September 28	@ Yankees	3–7	Tiant (13–8)	Edge (3–4)		17,647	53–107
161	September 29	@ Yankees	4–9	John (21–9)	Huffman (6–18)		30,016	53–108
162	September 30	@ Yankees	2–9	Davis (14–2)	Stieb (8–8)	Griffin (1)	28,150	53–109

== Player stats ==
= Indicates team leader

=== Batting ===
==== Starters by position ====
Note: Pos = Position; G = Games played; AB = At bats; R = Runs scored; H = Hits; 2B = Doubles; 3B = Triples; Avg. = Batting average; HR = Home runs; RBI = Runs batted in; SB = Stolen bases

Pos	Player	G	AB	R	H	2B	3B	Avg.	HR	RBI	SB
C	Rick Cerone	136	469	47	112	27	4	.239	7	61	1
1B	John Mayberry	137	464	61	127	22	1	.274	21	74	1
2B	Danny Ainge	87	308	26	73	7	1	.237	2	19	1
3B	Roy Howell	138	511	60	126	28	4	.247	15	72	1
SS	Alfredo Griffin	153	624	81	179	22	10	.287	2	31	21
LF	Alvis Woods	132	436	57	121	24	4	.278	5	36	6
CF	Rick Bosetti	162	619	59	161	35	2	.260	8	65	13
RF	Bob Bailor	130	414	50	95	11	5	.229	1	38	14
DH	Rico Carty	132	461	48	118	26	0	.256	12	55	3

==== Other batters ====
Note: G = Games played; AB = At bats; R = Runs scored; H = Hits; 2B = Doubles; 3B = Triples; Avg. = Batting average; HR = Home runs; RBI = Runs batted in; SB = Stolen bases

Player	G	AB	R	H	2B	3B	Avg.	HR	RBI	SB
Otto Vélez	99	274	45	79	21	0	.288	15	48	0
Luis Gómez	59	163	11	39	7	0	.239	0	11	1
Dave McKay	47	156	19	34	9	0	.218	0	12	1
Joe Cannon	61	142	14	30	1	1	.211	1	5	12
Tony Solaita	36	102	14	27	8	1	.265	2	13	0
Bob Davis	32	89	6	11	2	0	.124	1	8	0
Tim Johnson	43	86	6	16	2	1	.186	0	6	0
Craig Kusick	23	54	3	11	1	0	.204	2	7	0
Bob Robertson	15	29	1	3	0	0	.103	1	1	0
Ted Wilborn	22	12	3	0	0	0	.000	0	0	0
Bobby Brown	4	10	1	0	0	0	.000	0	0	0
Pedro Hernández	3	0	1	0	0	0	----	0	0	0

=== Pitching ===
==== Starting pitchers ====
Note: G = Games pitched; GS = Games started; IP = Innings pitched; W = Wins; L = Losses; ERA = Earned run average; R = Runs allowed; ER = Earned runs allowed; BB = Walks allowed; K = Strikeouts

Player	G	GS	IP	W	L	ERA	R	ER	BB	K
Tom Underwood	33	32	227.0	9	16	3.69	113	93	95	127
Phil Huffman	31	31	173.0	6	18	5.77	130	111	68	56
Dave Lemanczyk	22	20	143.0	8	10	3.71	65	59	45	63
Dave Stieb	18	18	129.1	8	8	4.31	70	62	48	52
Jim Clancy	12	11	63.2	2	7	5.51	44	39	31	33
Butch Edge	9	9	51.2	3	4	5.23	32	30	24	19

==== Other pitchers ====
Note: G = Games pitched; GS = Games started; IP = Innings pitched; W = Wins; L = Losses; SV = Saves; ERA = Earned run average; R = Runs allowed; ER = Earned runs allowed; BB = Walks allowed; K = Strikeouts

Player	G	GS	IP	W	L	SV	ERA	R	ER	BB	K
Balor Moore	34	16	139.1	5	7	0	4.84	85	75	79	51
Jesse Jefferson	34	10	116.0	2	10	1	5.51	75	71	45	43
Mark Lemongello	18	10	83.0	1	9	0	6.29	64	58	34	40

==== Relief pitchers ====
Note: G = Games pitched; IP = Innings pitched; W = Wins; L = Losses; SV = Saves; ERA = Earned run average; R = Runs allowed; ER = Earned runs allowed; BB = Walks allowed; K = Strikeouts

Player	G	IP	W	L	SV	ERA	R	ER	BB	K
Tom Buskey	44	78.2	6	10	7	3.43	33	30	25	44
Dave Freisleben	42	91.0	2	3	3	4.95	57	50	53	35
Mike Willis	17	26.2	0	3	0	8.44	27	25	16	8
Jackson Todd	12	32.1	0	1	0	5.85	26	21	7	14
Tom Murphy	10	18.1	1	2	0	5.40	11	11	8	6
Dyar Miller	10	15.1	0	0	0	10.57	18	18	5	7
Jerry Garvin	8	22.2	0	1	0	2.78	9	7	10	14
Steve Grilli	1	2.1	0	0	0	0.00	0	0	0	1
Craig Kusick	1	3.2	0	0	0	4.91	2	2	0	0
Steve Luebber	1	0.0	0	0	0	inf	1	1	1	0

== Awards and honours ==
- Alfredo Griffin, American League Rookie of the Year Award
- Alfredo Griffin, Player of the Month Award, September

All-Star Game

- Dave Lemanczyk, reserve

== Farm system ==
Level	Team	League	Manager
AAA	Syracuse Chiefs	International League	Vern Benson
A	Kinston Eagles	Carolina League	Duane Larson
A	Dunedin Blue Jays	Florida State League	Denis Menke
A-Short Season	Utica Blue Jays	New York–Penn League	John McLaren
Rookie	Medicine Hat Blue Jays	Pioneer League	Dennis Holmberg
