= Vance Law =

American baseball player and coach (born 1956)

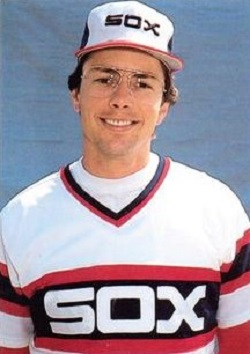
- Third baseman
- Born: October 1, 1956 (age 70); Boise, Idaho, U.S.
- Batted: Right Threw: Right

MLB debut
- June 1, 1980, for the Pittsburgh Pirates

Last MLB appearance
- October 6, 1991, for the Oakland Athletics

MLB statistics
- Batting average: .256
- Home runs: 71
- Runs batted in: 442

NPB statistics
- Batting average: .313
- Home runs: 29
- Runs batted in: 78
- Stats at Baseball Reference

Teams
- Pittsburgh Pirates (1980–1981); Chicago White Sox (1982–1984); Montreal Expos (1985–1987); Chicago Cubs (1988–1989); Chunichi Dragons (1990); Oakland Athletics (1991)

Career highlights and awards
- All-Star (1988)

Vance Law
Biographical details
- Born: October 1, 1956 (age 70); Boise, Idaho

Playing career
- 1974–78: BYU
- Positions: Shortstop (baseball); Point Guard (basketball)

Coaching career (HC unless noted)
- 2000–2012: Brigham Young University

Accomplishments and honors

Championships
- Mountain West Conference (2001)

Awards
- Mountain West Conference Coach of the Year (2001)

Vance Aaron Law (born October 1, 1956) is an American former professional baseball third baseman. He played in Major League Baseball (MLB) for the Pittsburgh Pirates (1980–81), Chicago White Sox (1982–84), Montreal Expos (1985–87), Chicago Cubs (1988–89), and Oakland Athletics (1991). He also played one season in Nippon Professional Baseball (NPB) for the Chunichi Dragons in 1990. Law batted and threw right-handed. He is the son of Cy Young Award winner Vern Law. He served as head baseball coach at Brigham Young University from 2000 to 2012.

== College ==
Vance Law played college baseball for Brigham Young University. In 1978, he was drafted by the Pittsburgh Pirates, the same team his father Vern starred for when Vance was a child. The Pirates drafted Law in the 39th round of that year's draft. The only other player drafted that round that would make it to the majors was Tim Hulett, who would briefly be a teammate of Law's in the mid 80's with the White Sox.

== Pro career ==
Law made his major league debut on June 1, 1980 against the New York Mets, getting one hit in five at bats. Over the course of the next two seasons, Law split time between the Pirates and their Triple-A team, the Portland Beavers of the Pacific Coast League. In March 1982, the Pirates traded Law, along with pitcher Ernie Camacho to the Chicago White Sox for pitcher Ross Baumgarten and Butch Edge. He spent the next few seasons with the White Sox, becoming their regular second baseman. In 1984, Law hit 17 home runs, the most homers he'd ever hit in one season in the majors. Law would be on the move again, this time traded to the Montreal Expos in exchange for pitcher Bob James. In 1987, the Expos did not renew his contract, which allowed him to become a free agent. He signed with the Chicago Cubs later that winter. Law's best season in the Major Leagues was in 1988 when he hit .293, with 163 hits, and 78 RBIs. He was selected to the 1988 All-Star Game as one of a then-record six Cubs players on the team (Andre Dawson, Greg Maddux, Ryne Sandberg, Rafael Palmeiro, and Shawon Dunston were the other five.)

The Cub with the longest hitting streak to start the season is Vance Law in 1988 with 16 games.

Law holds an American League record for the longest errorless game by a third baseman when he played all 25 innings of the longest game in AL history (May 8 and 9, 1984, against the Milwaukee Brewers). Law also appeared as a pitcher in 7 games, all as an emergency relief pitcher in games that were already blowout losses. Law finished all 7 games he appeared in, and had a career ERA of 3.38 in 8 innings.

After being let go by the Cubs, Law signed with the Chunichi Dragons of the Japan Central League. He'd have one of his finest seasons as a pro, hitting 29 home runs, and batting .313 for the season. Law wasn't the only American on the roster for the Dragons that year. Former Pirates prospect Benny Distefano was also on the roster. After his stint in Japan, Law signed with the Oakland A's and split time between the major league club and their triple-A team the Tacoma Tigers.

Vance is the first of only four sons of former Cy Young Award winners to reach the big leagues, the others being Kyle Drabek (son of 1990 NL winner Doug Drabek), Cam Bedrosian (son of 1987 NL winner Steve Bedrosian), and Kody Clemens (son of seven time winner Roger Clemens). Law's son Adam also played baseball, but never made it to the majors.

== Coaching career ==
Law coached at Provo High School after which he became head baseball coach at Brigham Young University in 2000. Following the 2012 season, Law did not have his contract renewed. Law was 397–347–2 as head coach over a 13-year span.

In December 2012, the Chicago White Sox announced Law would rejoin the organization as a minor league coach.

In December 2019, the Cleveland Indians announced Law would join the organization as a minor league coach.

== See also ==
- List of second-generation Major League Baseball players
