= Brooklyn Cyclones =

Minor League Baseball team based in Brooklyn, New York

- Founded in 2001; Brooklyn, New York
Team logo
Cap insignia

Minor league affiliations
- Class: High-A (2021–present)
- Previous classes: Class A Short Season (2001–2020)
- League: South Atlantic League (2021–present)
- Division: North Division
- Previous leagues: New York–Penn League (2001–2020)

Major league affiliations
- Team: New York Mets (2001–present)

Minor league titles
- League titles (3): 2001; 2019; 2025
- Division titles (7): 2001; 2003; 2004; 2007; 2010; 2019; 2025
- First-half titles (1): 2025
- Second-half titles (1): 2022

Team data
- Name: Brooklyn Cyclones (2001–present)
- Colors: Navy, light blue, red, yellow
- Ballpark: Maimonides Park (2001–present)
- Owner/ Operator: Diamond Baseball Holdings
- President: Steven Cohen
- General manager: Kevin Mahoney
- Manager: Eduardo Nunez
- Website: milb.com/brooklyn

The Brooklyn Cyclones are a Minor League Baseball team of the South Atlantic League and the High-A affiliate of the New York Mets. They are based in the New York City borough of Brooklyn, and play at Maimonides Park, just off the Coney Island Boardwalk.

Brooklyn won six division titles and two NYPL championships. In 2001, the Cyclones were declared co-league champions with the Williamsport Crosscutters, being forced to prematurely end their championship series due to the September 11 attacks, despite the Cyclones leading the series one game to none. Their second NYPL championship came in 2019, representing the first title for a professional sports team based in Brooklyn since the 1955 Brooklyn Dodgers. Brooklyn won its first South Atlantic League championship in 2025.

The club was owned by the Mets from its inception through 2024, when it was sold to Diamond Baseball Holdings, a conglomerate that operates over 40 Minor League Baseball teams in the United States and Canada.

== History ==
The Cyclones began as the St. Catharines, Ontario, St. Catharines Blue Jays (later St. Catharines Stompers) in 1986 as a team in the New York–Penn League. They were named for their parent club, the Toronto Blue Jays. In 1995, the team was sold by the city of Toronto to a group of local investors which included former Toronto catcher Ernie Whitt.

In 1999, New York Mayor Rudolph Giuliani announced a deal that would bring two minor league baseball teams to the boroughs outside Manhattan. New ballparks would be constructed for the Staten Island Yankees and the Cyclones. Prior to the 2000 season, the team was bought and moved to Queens, becoming known as the Queens Kings. The club played its 2000 season at Jack Kaiser Stadium on the St. John's University campus in Jamaica, in the borough of Queens, remaining a Blue Jays affiliate for one last season.

A "name-the-team" contest was held to determine a new name for the franchise. The winning selection, Cyclones, refers to the famous Coney Island Cyclone roller coaster at nearby Astroland amusement park on Coney Island. The Mets' Double-A affiliate, the Binghamton Rumble Ponies, are also named after amusement park rides, specifically, the 6 antique carousels found in or near Binghamton, New York.

The team's new park, which was then called KeySpan Park, was completed in time for the 2001 season. Brooklyn had been without professional baseball since the Brooklyn Dodgers left Ebbets Field for Los Angeles, California in 1958. After approximately three weeks of play, additional seats had to be added to the stadium to accommodate fans.

The Cyclones managed by Edgar Alfonzo played well in their opening season with the best record in the league (52–24), where they led the NY Penn-League with a 2.35 team ERA. They defeated the Staten Island Yankees in a classic NYPL opening playoff round. The deciding game won by the Cyclones 4–1 featured trickery by Catcher Brett Kay who faked giving up on a play only to receive a laser throw from John Toner to tag out a runner at the plate. Advancing to the championship series against the Williamsport Crosscutters. The Cyclones traveled to Bowman Field in Williamsport, Pennsylvania, winning the series opener on September 10, 2001, by a score of 8–4. The potential championship clincher was scheduled for September 11 in Brooklyn. However, due to the September 11 attacks, all minor league baseball playoffs were canceled. The Cyclones and Crosscutters were declared co-champions.

The 2002 season was filled with inconsistent play and questionable pitching decisions by manager Howard Johnson leading to a .500 season. Scott Kazmir pitched to a 0.50 ERA in five starts and had 34 strikeouts in only 18 innings pitched.

In 2003, the Cyclones managed by Tim Teufel won the McNamara division title with brilliant pitching led by starters, soon to be major leaguers, Matt Lindstrom and Brian Bannister and by relievers Robert Paulk and Carlos Muñiz. Despite a drop in run production, the Cyclones pitching staff willed their way into the playoffs, beating the Oneonta Tigers 2 games to 1 only to lose in the NYPL Championship to the Williamsport Crosscutters 2 games to none.

The 2004 season brought the most complete Cyclones team ever. Managed by Tony Tijerina, three batters hit over .300 and five starting pitchers made their starts in rotation for the last 55 games of the season except one game. The Cyclones won the McNamara division title only to lose to the Tri-City ValleyCats in controversial fashion. With the series tied, the Cyclones were leading 3–0 in the 3rd inning when the games was held up and eventually cancelled by rain, which wiped out the score. After another rainout, Game 3 was played from the beginning where the Cyclones lost the deciding game 7–1. A new rule was placed by the NY-Penn League that any games suspended because of rain, if a team or teams have scored runs in the game, the suspended game will be picked from the inning when the game was called.

The 2005 season managed by Mookie Wilson was hampered by inconsistent relief pitching that hampered games in the later innings despite a good offense. The Cyclones finished third and missed the playoffs. On August 23, 2005, The Cyclones and KeySpan Park hosted the first-ever New York–Penn League All-Star Game, which was won by the National League–affiliated team. The winning pitcher was Bobby Parnell. Also that year, the Cyclones became a major partner of Brooklyn's High School of Sports Management, a small school located down the block from KeySpan Park on West 19th Street and Mermaid Ave.

The 2006 season managed by George Greer mirrored the team name. A 7-game losing streak to start the season was followed by a 10-game winning streak which led the streaky Cyclones to the NYPL Playoffs in a dramatic extra-inning victory against the Vermont Lake Monsters in the final game of the season. The Cyclones would lose to the SI Yanks in the NYPL opening playoff round 2 games to none. On July 20, 2006, the Cyclones and the Oneonta Tigers took part in the longest game in the history of the New York–Penn League, a 26-inning marathon that the Cyclones lost, 6–1. The game took 6 hours and 40 minutes to complete. The Cyclones scored their lone run in the first inning; Oneonta tied the game in the fourth and then did not score again until they scored five runs in the top of the 26th inning. Cyclones manager George Greer was ejected from the contest in the first inning for arguing an umpire's call on a force play at second base.

The 2007 season managed by Edgar Alfonzo had the second most successful season in team history with a 49–25 record. With a consistent offense, great pitching and the best defense in the league, the Cyclones powered their way to winning its fourth McNamara division title and sweeping the SI Yankees in two straight games in the NYPL opening playoff round. Game One produced the best road win in team history when the Cyclones beat the SI Yanks, 8–4. However, the Cyclones went on to getting swept in disappointing fashion by the Auburn Doubledays for the NYPL Championship. After giving up a leadoff home run to shortstop Matt Bouchard, future Toronto Blue Jays starting pitcher Brett Cecil pitched one hit ball in 7 innings as the Doubledays won the game 4–1. On September 7, 2007, during the final regular season game (a 5–4 victory over the Lowell Spinners), the Cyclones set an all-time single-game attendance record of 10,073—2,573 more than the stadium's seating capacity in 2001. That season, the team won its fourth McNamara division title.

The 2008 season, managed again by Edgar Alfonzo, was marred by a poor start but recovered with a torrid finish at 45–30, narrowly missing the playoffs after losing the final game of the season to the Aberdeen Ironbirds 5–3 in extra innings. The team produced major leaguers and future New York Mets Ike Davis and Jenrry Mejía. But the team was marred with an inconsistent offense with less than average results with runners in scoring position.

On August 23, 2009, Cyclones pitcher Brandon Moore threw a 7-inning no-hitter in the first game of a doubleheader against the Aberdeen IronBirds, 5–0, at Ripken Stadium. Moore walked three and hit one batter, with only one IronBird reaching second base. This came seven years to the day Miguel Pinango threw a nine-inning one-hitter for the Cyclones, pitching 8 2/3 innings of no-hit ball.

On February 4, 2010, the team announced that the new name of their home would be called Municipal Credit Union (MCU) Park, replacing KeySpan as the naming right sponsor, which had held the naming rights from the opening of the stadium in 2001. In addition to the naming rights, MCU and the Cyclones entered into a comprehensive 11-year marketing partnership that launches the Cyclones' 10th season in Brooklyn. The partner agreement is scheduled to last until 2020.

The 2010 season saw the Cyclones, under the leadership of Wally Backman, lead the league with a record of 52–24, but the Cyclones fell in the Championship series to Tri-City ValleyCats. The Cyclones would make the playoffs as the wild card team in 2011 and 2012, but would not make it out of the semifinals. The Cyclones failed to make the playoffs in 2013 and lost a tie-breaker in 2014 on and missed the playoffs on the last day of the season.

Since 2014, the Cyclones have dedicated one night a year as a tribute to the popular sitcom Seinfeld, featuring various show tributes such as an "Elaine Benes dancing contest", determining if a fan had either picked or scratched their nose, the Cyclones wearing "Puffy Shirt"–styled jerseys, appearances from former actors and giveaways honoring the show. This game has since become one of the Cyclones' most popular events, regularly selling out in advance and drawing fans of both baseball and Seinfeld from near and far.

The 2015 season was the first time in franchise history the Brooklyn Cyclones finished below .500. The Cyclones would go on to have losing records in 2016 and 2017, but lost the tie-breaker and once again missed out on the playoffs on the last day of the season in 2018.

The Brooklyn Cyclones returned to the New York-Penn League playoffs in 2019, thanks to a strong finish to end the season, which included a series sweep of the Staten Island Yankees in what would be the final match-up between the longtime rivals. In the semi-finals, the Cyclones faced division rival and wild card winner in the Hudson Valley Renegades. The Cyclones fell to the Renegades 5–4 in Game 1. The Cyclones took Game 2 in Brooklyn by a score of 1–0, thanks to a solo homer from Jed Lowrie, who was on a rehab assignment from the Mets. The Cyclones won Game 3 on a walk-off double from Ranfy Adon, sending them to the New York-Penn League Championship.

The Cyclones faced the Lowell Spinners in a series that was dubbed "An MiLB Rematch of 1986", as the Spinners were a Red Sox farm team. The Cyclones took Game 1 in Lowell by a score of 2–1, before dropping game 2 in Brooklyn by a score of 3–1. Game 3 saw the Cyclones take a 2–0 lead in the bottom of the 2nd, but the Spinners tied it up the next half inning. After a solo homer by Marino Campana in the Top of the 7th put Lowell up 3–2, the Cyclones staged a rally to take a 4–3 lead, en route to winning the 2019 New York-Penn League Championship. The Cyclones were managed by former Met Edgardo Alfonzo, whose brother, Edgar, managed the Brooklyn Cyclones in 2001. Other coaches on the team included Pitching Coach Josue Matos, Hitting Coach Delwyn Young and Bench Coach Endy Chavez

The Cyclones would be the final New York-Penn League champions, as the COVID-19 Pandemic cancelled the 2020 season and the ensuing MiLB realignment led to the dissolving of the New York-Penn League.

In October 2020, Steve Cohen bought the New York Mets, Syracuse Mets, St. Lucie Mets and Brooklyn Cyclones from the Wilpon family. This has led to a unique situation, as the longtime Vice President of the Brooklyn Cyclones is also named Steve Cohen, but unrelated to the new owner.

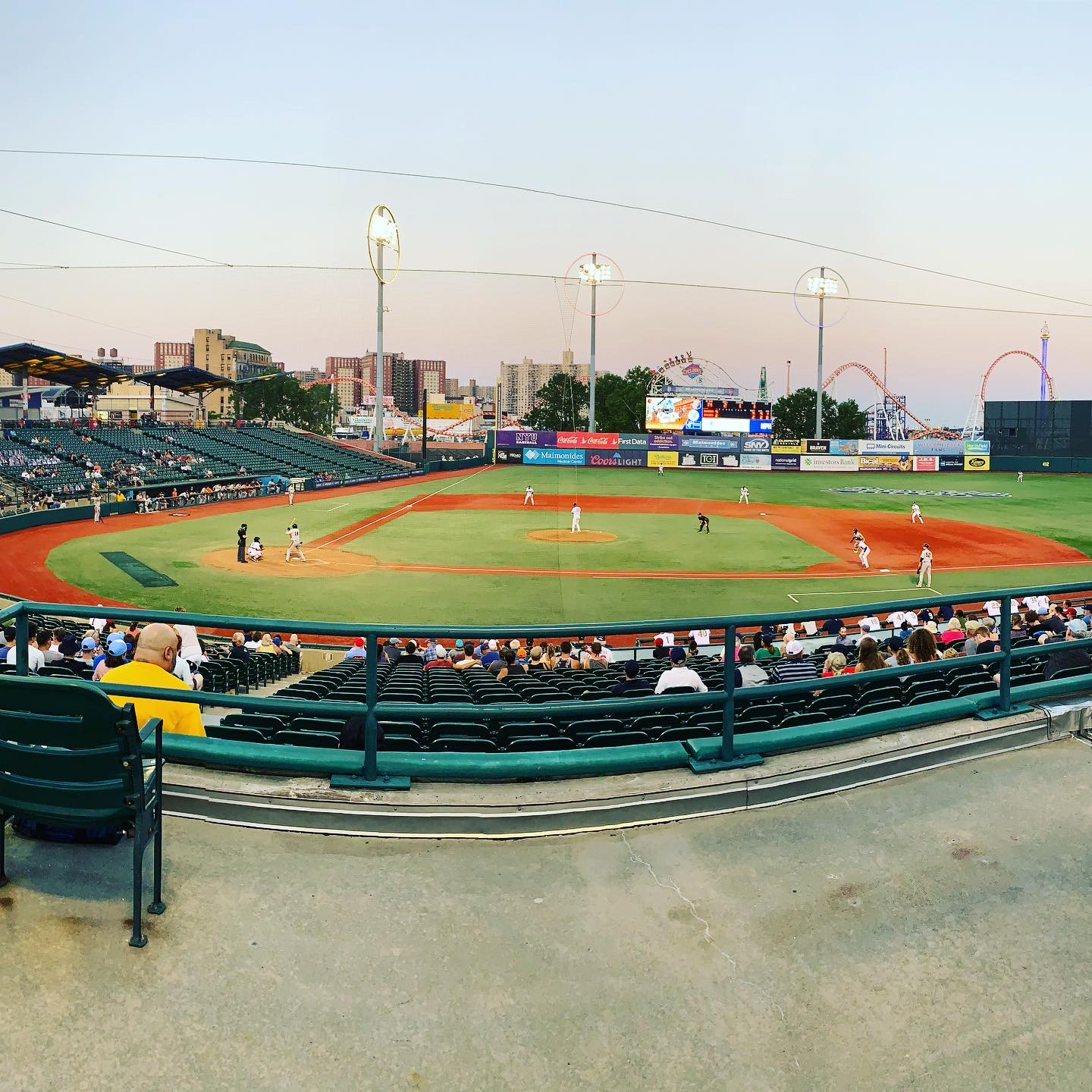
A Cyclones Game in 2021

The Cyclones' main rivals prior to the 2021 restructuring of Minor League Baseball were the Staten Island Yankees, a rivalry often called the "Battle of the Boroughs", after the boroughs of Brooklyn and Staten Island, or the "Battle for the Bridge", after the Verrazzano–Narrows Bridge which separated the two teams. Only 13 miles (21 km) apart, the two teams had the closest proximity in the Minor Leagues. The two teams generally sold out the games which pitted them against each other. A major contribution to this intense rivalry was that both parent teams were also based in New York (the Mets in Queens, and the Yankees in the Bronx). Other regional rivals included the Hudson Valley Renegades and the Tri-City ValleyCats.

In conjunction with Major League Baseball's restructuring of Minor League Baseball in 2021, the Cyclones were organized into the 12-team High-A East. In 2022, the High-A East became known as the South Atlantic League, the name historically used by the regional circuit prior to the 2021 reorganization.

In December 2024, Steve Cohen announced that he had sold the Cyclones to Diamond Baseball Holdings.

In 2025, Brooklyn won its first South Atlantic League Championship.

== Alumni ==
The first Cyclone to break into the major leagues was infielder Danny Garcia, who made his debut with the New York Mets on September 2, 2003, at Shea Stadium. Scott Kazmir, who played with Brooklyn in 2002, made his major league debut with the Tampa Bay Devil Rays in 2004. Still with the Rays in 2008, Kazmir was tagged with the loss in Game 1 of the 2008 World Series. He is the first former Cyclone to reach the World Series, though Lenny DiNardo, who pitched with the Cyclones in 2001, won a World Series ring with the Boston Red Sox in 2004 while on the Disabled List.

Mike Jacobs, who was a member of the inaugural 2001 Cyclones team, made his Mets debut on August 21, 2005, hitting a three-run pinch-hit home run off Washington Nationals pitcher Esteban Loaiza. In 30 games with 100 at bats for the Mets, Jacobs hit 11 home runs and had 23 RBI before being traded to the Florida Marlins after the season.

In April 2006, Brian Bannister became the first Cyclone pitcher to make his debut with the Mets in a game against the Washington Nationals at Shea. The following April, sidearm reliever Joe Smith, who pitched for the Cyclones in 2006, made his major league debut on opening day for the Mets against the St. Louis Cardinals. Smith pitched a scoreless third of an inning in the Mets win. First baseman/outfielder Nick Evans was called up on May 24, 2008, as an injury replacement. Evans, who played with the Cyclones in 2005, had 3 doubles in his first major league game. Ike Davis played for the Cyclones in 2008. In 2012, Davis led the Mets with 32 home runs. Daniel Murphy made his Mets debut in 2008. In 2015, Murphy was the NLCS MVP in the Mets series victory against the Chicago Cubs. Juan Lagares was called up by the Mets in 2013 and won a Gold Glove in 2014. In 2015, Michael Conforto was called up by the Mets and hit two home runs in Game 4 of the 2015 World Series, becoming the third youngest player to hit two home runs in a World Series game. The Mets would lose the World Series as former Cyclone Wilmer Flores struck out to make the final out. The strike out was caught by former Cyclone Drew Butera of the Royals. Pete Alonso made his Mets debut in 2019. Alonso broke the rookie home run record with 53 home runs and won the NL Rookie of the Year.

As of 2022, the Cyclones had sent 60 players to the Major Leagues. The current and former major leaguers who are Brooklyn Cyclones alumni and the teams they last played for (or are currently playing for) are:

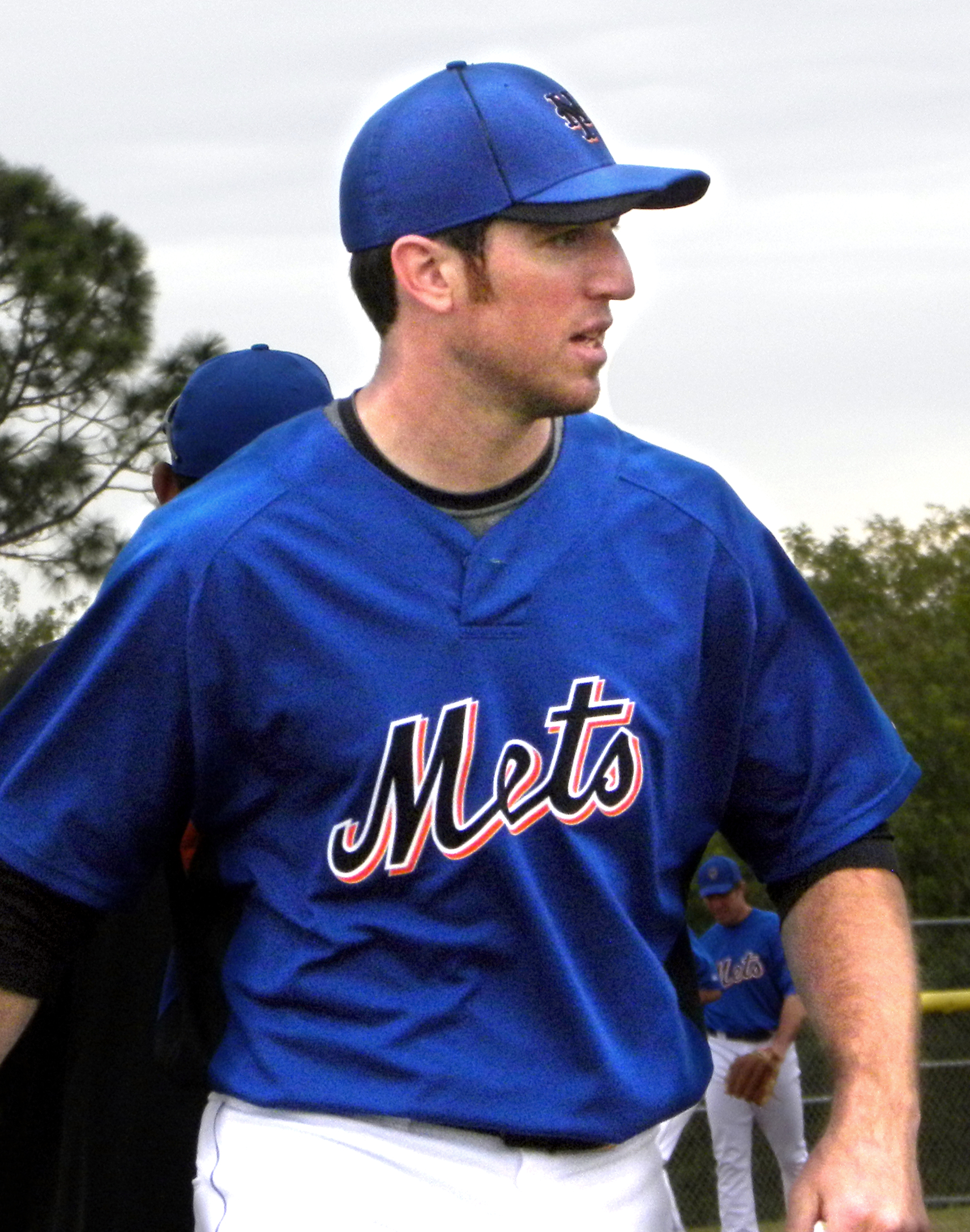
Ike Davis

- Pete Alonso, first baseman for the Baltimore Orioles
- Matt Bowman, pitcher for the Minnesota Twins
- Drew Butera, former catcher for the Los Angeles Angels, now coach for the Toronto Blue Jays
- Robinson Canó, former second baseman for the Atlanta Braves, now second baseman for the Diablos Rojos del México of the Mexican Baseball League
- Juan Centeno, catcher for the Arizona Diamondbacks
- Luis Cessa, free agent pitcher
- Michael Conforto, outfielder for the Chicago Cubs
- Wilmer Flores, former infielder for the San Francisco Giants, now infielder for the Toros del Tijuana of the Mexican Baseball League
- Phillip Evans, former infielder for the Atlanta Braves, now infielder for the Toros del Tijuana of the Mexican Baseball League
- John Gant, former pitcher for the Kansas City Royals, now pitcher for the Wei Chuan Dragons of the Chinese Professional Baseball League
- Robert Gsellman, former pitcher for the Washington Nationals, now pitcher for the Bravos de León of the Mexican Baseball League
- Eric Hanhold, former pitcher for the San Diego Padres
- Adam Kolarek, former pitcher for the Los Angeles Angels
- Juan Lagares, former center fielder for the Los Angeles Angels and SSG Landers of the KBO League
- Jed Lowrie, former infielder for the Oakland Athletics
- Seth Lugo, pitcher for the Kansas City Royals
- Collin McHugh, former pitcher for the Atlanta Braves
- Rafael Montero, free agent pitcher
- Tomás Nido, catcher for the Boston Red Sox
- Brandon Nimmo, outfielder for the Texas Rangers
- Corey Oswalt, former pitcher for the Colorado Rockies
- Tim Peterson, former pitcher for the Los Angeles Angels and the Algodoneros de Unión Laguna of the Mexican Baseball League
- Yusmeiro Petit, former pitcher for the San Diego Padres
- Kevin Plawecki, former catcher for the San Diego Padres, now catching coach for the San Diego Padres
- T.J. Rivera, former infielder for the Philadelphia Phillies, now coach for the Cleveland Guardians
- Hansel Robles, former pitcher for the Boston Red Sox, now pitcher for the Bravos de León of the Mexican Baseball League
- Amed Rosario, infielder for the New York Yankees
- Paul Sewald, pitcher for the Toronto Blue Jays
- Joe Smith, former pitcher for the Minnesota Twins
- Wilfredo Tovar, former infielder for the New York Mets, now infielder for the Leones de Yucatán of the Mexican Baseball League
- Brad Wieck, former pitcher for the Chicago Cubs

== Yearly results, managers and coaches ==
Year	Record	Place	Playoff Results	Manager	Pitching Coach	Hitting Coach	Assistant Coach
2001	52–24	1st	Defeated Staten Island Yankees (2–1); Co-Champs with Williamsport Crosscutters due to 9/11 Attacks	Edgar Alfonzo	Bobby Ojeda	Howard Johnson	
2002	38–38	4th		Howard Johnson	Bobby Ojeda	Donovan Mitchell	
2003	47–28	1st	Defeated Oneonta Tigers (2–1); Lost to Williamsport (2–0)	Tim Teufel	Hector Berrios	Roger LaFrancois	
2004	43–31	1st	Lost to Tri-City (2–1)	Tony Tijerina	Hector Berrios	Donovan Mitchell	
2005	40–36	3rd		Mookie Wilson	Steve Merriman	Donovan Mitchell	Juan Lopez
2006	41–33	2nd Wild Card Winner	Lost to Staten Island Yankees (2–0)	George Greer	Hector Berrios	Scott Hunter	Juan Lopez; Guadalupe Jabalera
2007	49–25	1st	Defeated Staten Island Yankees (2–0) Lost to Auburn Doubledays (2–0)	Edgar Alfonzo	Hector Berrios	Guadalupe Jabalera	
2008	45–30	2nd		Edgar Alfonzo	Hector Berrios	Guadalupe Jabalera	
2009	45–30	2nd Wild Card Winner	Lost to Mahoning Valley Scrappers (2–0)	Pedro Lopez	Rick Tomlin	Jack Voigt	Joel Fuentes
2010	51–24	1st	Defeated Jamestown Jammers (2–1) Lost to Tri-City ValleyCats (2–0)	Wally Backman	Rick Tomlin	Benny Distefano	Joel Fuentes
2011	45–29	2nd Wild Card Winner	Lost to Staten Island Yankees (2–1)	Rich Donnelly	Frank Viola	Bobby Malek	
2012	45–31	2nd Wild Card Winner	Lost to Hudson Valley Renegades (2–1)	Rich Donnelly	Marc Valdes	Bobby Malek	
2013	38–37	2nd		Rich Donnelly	Marc Valdes	Bobby Malek	
2014	42–34	2nd		Tom Gamboa	Tom Signore; Dave LaRoche	Benny Distefano	Edgardo Alfonzo; David Davalillo
2015	33–43	4th		Tom Gamboa	Dave LaRoche	Yunir Garcia	Edgardo Alfonzo
2016	37–39	3rd		Tom Gamboa	Billy Bryk Jr.	Sean Ratliff	Edgardo Alfonzo
2017	24–52	4th		Edgardo Alfonzo	Royce Ring	Sean Ratliff	
2018	40–35	2nd		Edgardo Alfonzo	Royce Ring	Marlon Anderson	Rich Donnelly
2019	43–32	1st	Defeated Hudson Valley Renegades (2–1); Defeated Lowell Spinners (2–1); League champions	Edgardo Alfonzo	Josue Matos	Delwyn Young	Endy Chavez
2020	Season cancelled (COVID-19 pandemic)			Ed Blankmeyer	Josh Towers	Rafael Fernandez	Benny Distefano
2021	48–70	5th		Ed Blankmeyer	Royce Ring	Nic Jackson	Mariano Duncan
2022	70–62	1st	Lost to Aberdeen Ironbirds 2–1 in Division Series	Luis Rivera	A.J. Sager	Richie Benes	Chris Newell
2023	66–65	5th		Chris Newell	Victor Ramos	Richie Benes	John Vaughn
2024	65-67	5th		Gilbert Gomez	Dan McKinney	Eduardo Nunez	John Vaughn
2025	TBD	TBD		Gilbert Gomez	Jordan Kraus	Bryan Muniz	Eduardo Nunez

NOTES:

- Bob Ojeda, Howard Johnson, Tim Teufel, Mookie Wilson, and Wally Backman all played on the 1986 World Champion NY Mets.
- Frank Viola, Edgardo Alfonzo, Royce Ring, Marlon Anderson and Endy Chavez played for the Mets during their careers.
- Bobby Malek, Yunir Garcia, Sean Ratliff, Rafael Fernandez and Luis Rivera played for the Brooklyn Cyclones.
- Edgar Alfonzo and Edgardo Alfonzo are brothers and the only managers to lead the Brooklyn Cyclones to NYPL championships.
- Leon Lee was named Manager for the 2004 season, but resigned during Spring Training due to an indecent exposure incident.
- Tom Signore left the team in July 2014 due to a concussion and was replaced by Dave LaRoche. Signore was named the pitching coach for 2015, but was forced to miss the season due to the concussion and LaRoche filled in.
- David Davalillo joined the Cyclones late in the 2014 season after the DSL Mets finished their season.

== Retired and honored numbers ==
A total of 10 numbers hang on the press level of Maimonides Park.

Brooklyn Dodgers: 4: Duke Snider; 14: Joan and Gil Hodges 17: Carl Erskine; 36: Don Newcombe; 42: Jackie Robinson;

Brooklyn Cyclones: 6: Danny Garcia; 19: Brian Bannister; 20: Dillon Gee; 35: Ángel Pagán;

NOTE: A Cyclones player may still wear these numbers, with the exception of 14, and 42. The numbers that may not be worn by Cyclones players are numbers that have been retired by the Mets.

On August 22, 2011, the Brooklyn Cyclones also honored Pia Toscano, who sang the anthem prior to a game in 2003 by putting a plaque on the press level.

On August 15, 2014, the Cyclones added Joan Hodges, the widow of Gil Hodges, to the ring of Honored Numbers.

== Mascots ==
The Cyclones have two mascots, Sandy the Seagull and Pee-Wee. Sandy, the primary mascot, has been with the team since the inaugural Cyclones season in 2001. Pee-wee was introduced in 2003 as Sandy's adopted son. Sandy is named for Brooklyn/Los Angeles Dodgers pitcher Sandy Koufax, while Pee-Wee was named after Brooklyn Dodgers shortstop Pee Wee Reese. Even though Hurricane Sandy damaged MCU Park and Coney Island, the Cyclones kept the name Sandy on their mascot.

In 2006, the team introduced a new unnamed mascot: a blow-up "ZOOperstars!" type pelican. Despite a contest to name the character, it was never given an official name. The Pelican has not made an appearance since the 2006 season. In 2008, Maverick the Wonder Dog was introduced. He was a real Chocolate Labrador Retriever who was owned by one of the Cyclones staff members. The goal was to have Maverick learn tricks like picking up baseballs and bats. Like the Pelican, Maverick lasted only one season.

A Hot Dog race is held at every game at Maimonides Park, which is sponsored by Nathan's Famous. The first Nathan's store is located two blocks away from the ballpark. The three hot dogs currently racing are Ketchup, Mustard, and Relish. For many years Relish has become a fan favorite because he either wins very few races or none at all during the season.

== On field entertainers ==
MCs

2001–2003: "Party Marty" Haber, a member of the Cyclones front office.

2003–2019, 2022–present: King Henry, A local entertainer. In 2013, King Henry became the main on field entertainer. He was not brought back for the 2021 season before returning in 2022.

2007–2010: Jay Moran, who had served as PA Announcer in 2006.

2011: Jason Negron

2012: Dan Pecoraro, a member of the Cyclones front office.

2021: Christina Moore, a member of the Cyclones front office.

In 2013, Bucky the Buccaneer was introduced. Every time the Brooklyn Cyclones would score a run, this pirate themed mascot would run around the field from one dugout to the next, waving his rally flags in excitement. Bucky was played by a first year intern, Daniel DePasquale. He worked with the Brooklyn Cyclones for 2 seasons.

Beach Bums and Surf Squad

The original "Cyclones Beach Bums" were a group of men and women who entertained the ballpark from 2003 through 2008, were seen all over the ballpark dancing, interacting with fans, and handing out promotional items. In 2009, the beach bums were introduced as an all women dance team. Following the 2016 season, the team was rebranded as the Surf Squad and reverted to being a co-ed dance team with a promotional focus.

== Public address announcers ==
2001–2005: Dom Alagia.

2006: Sean Howard for 1 month, replaced by Jay Moran a PA Announcer at St. John's.

2007 – July 2010: David Freeman, who had served as PA Announcer for the Queens Kings. Freeman left to become an MLB Scorer with the Mets and Yankees.

August 2010 – 2021: Mark Fratto, who also serves as the PA Announcer for NYCFC, the Washington Wizards, the Westchester Knicks and NJ/NY Gotham FC.

2021 Colin Cosell

== Media ==
WKRB (90.3 FM) was the official radio station of the Cyclones. It served as radio home for every Cyclones season through 2016, with the exception of 2012 when WSOU was the official radio station of the Cyclones. Cyclones games will air occasionally on BCAT and SNY.

2001–2011: Warner Fusselle and Reginald Armstrong served as radio voices of the Brooklyn Cyclones for the first two years and Warner continued until his death on June 10, 2012, a week prior to the 2012 Cyclones season.

2012: David Rind, Vincent Coughlin and Chris Paizis, who all called Seton Hall baseball, split the broadcasting duties, with Rind serving as the road announcer.

2013: David Greenwald served as the radio voice of the Cyclones for 1 year on WKRB.

2014–2017: Stu Johnson. In addition to Brooklyn Cyclones games, Stu also announced Brooklyn Bolts games on WKRB. Jake Eisenberg joined Johnson in the booth for the 2017 season.

2018–2022: Keith Raad, along with Dom Savino (2018–2021) and Nick DeLuca (2022). Raad left the Cyclones in 2023 to join the Mets radio broadcast team.

Print Media 2001–present: The Brooklyn Paper has covered every Cyclones game since the team's inception. Columnists for The Paper following the team through the years include Gersh Kuntzman and Ed Shakespeare. The Paper's Cyclones section is edited by Vince DiMiceli.

== Roster ==
Brooklyn Cyclones roster
Players	Coaches/Other
Pitchers: 35 Juan Arnaud; 15 Josh Blum; 12 Nicolas Carreno; 56 Jose Chirinos; 15 Irving Cota; 58 Joel Díaz; 38 Hunter Hodges; 21 Daviel Hurtado; 28 Gregori Louis; 48 Ernesto Mercedes; 29 Elwis Mijares; 43 Brady Miller; 8 Emilio Obispo; 9 Joe Scarborough; 49 Rafi Vazquez; 8 Conner Ware; 54 Calvin Ziegler; Catchers: 33 Daiverson Gutierrez; 4 Ronald Hernandez; 34 Chase Meggers; 39 Alejandro Urias; Infielders: 23 Yonatan Henriquez; 10 Colin Houck; 55 Antonio Jimenez; 13 Cole Mathis; 60 Elian Peña; 2 Trey Snyder; 1 Sammy Stafura; Outfielders: 40 Randy Guzman; 30 Aiden Robbins; 25 Aidan Smith; 6 John Smith III; 7 John Spikerman	Manager: 11 Eduardo Nunez; Coaches: 26 Luis Alvarado (pitching); 44 Dallas Burke (bench); 20 Devin DeYoung (hitting); 60-day injured list: 65 Ryan Ammons (full season); -- Eli Ankeney (full season); -- Boston Baro; -- Hoss Brewer; 58 Frank Camarillo (full season); 48 Felix Cepeda; -- Wyatt Hudepohl; -- Estarling Mercado (full season); -- Austin Troesser (full season); -- Alejandro Urias; 7-day injured list; * On New York Mets 40-man roster; ~ Development list; # Rehab assignment; ∞ Reserve list; ‡ Restricted list; § Suspended list; † Temporarily inactive list; Roster updated September 11, 2026; Transactions; → More rosters: MiLB • South Atlantic League; → New York Mets minor league players
