= Jack Kaiser Stadium =

Baseball stadium in New York City

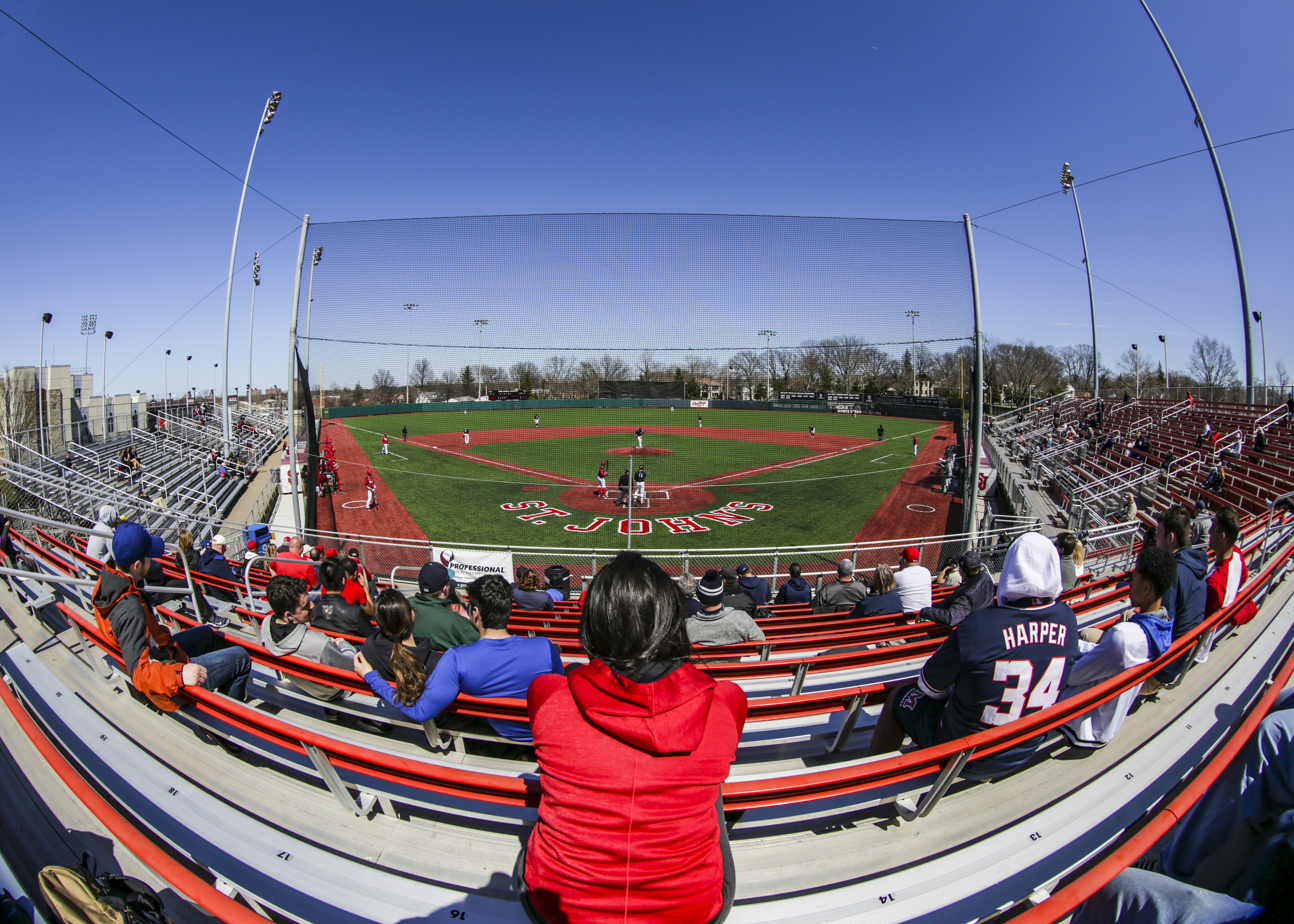
- Interactive map of Jack Kaiser Stadium
- Former names: The Ballpark at St. John's
- Address: 80th Drive and Utopia Parkway (between Union Turnpike and Grand Central Parkway)
- Location: Jamaica, Queens, New York
- Coordinates: 40.723647°N 73.791704°W
- Seating type: metal bleachers
- Capacity: 3,500
- Surface: Grass
- Scoreboard: Electronic

Construction
- Opened: 2000
- Cost: $6 million

Tenant
- St. John's Red Storm Baseball

Jack Kaiser Stadium, originally known as The Ballpark at St. John's, is a baseball stadium located on the campus of St. John's University in the neighborhood of Hillcrest near the neighborhoods of Jamaica and Fresh Meadows in New York City. Formerly used by the now-defunct Queens Kings minor league team in its inaugural season of 2000, it is currently used by the St. John's Red Storm baseball team.

== History ==
After the 1999 season, the New York Mets purchased the St. Catharines Stompers of the New York–Penn League, planning to move them from Ontario to Brooklyn. However, the stadium for the newly minted Brooklyn Cyclones would not be ready until 2001 (nor would their affiliation contract with the Toronto Blue Jays expire until then), so the Mets decided to "park" the franchise in Queens for the 2000 season, dubbing them the Queens Kings. Striking a deal with St. John's University, the Mets built a ballpark for the Kings, then donated it to the school and the Red Storm college baseball team, which plays in Division I Big East Conference of the NCAA. In 2007, the stadium was named for St. John's All-American baseball player John W. "Jack" Kaiser. Kaiser, who played in the late 1940s, was head coach of the baseball team from 1956 to 1973, athletic director from 1973 to 1995, and is currently emeritus athletic director at St. John's University. The stadium holds 3,500 people.

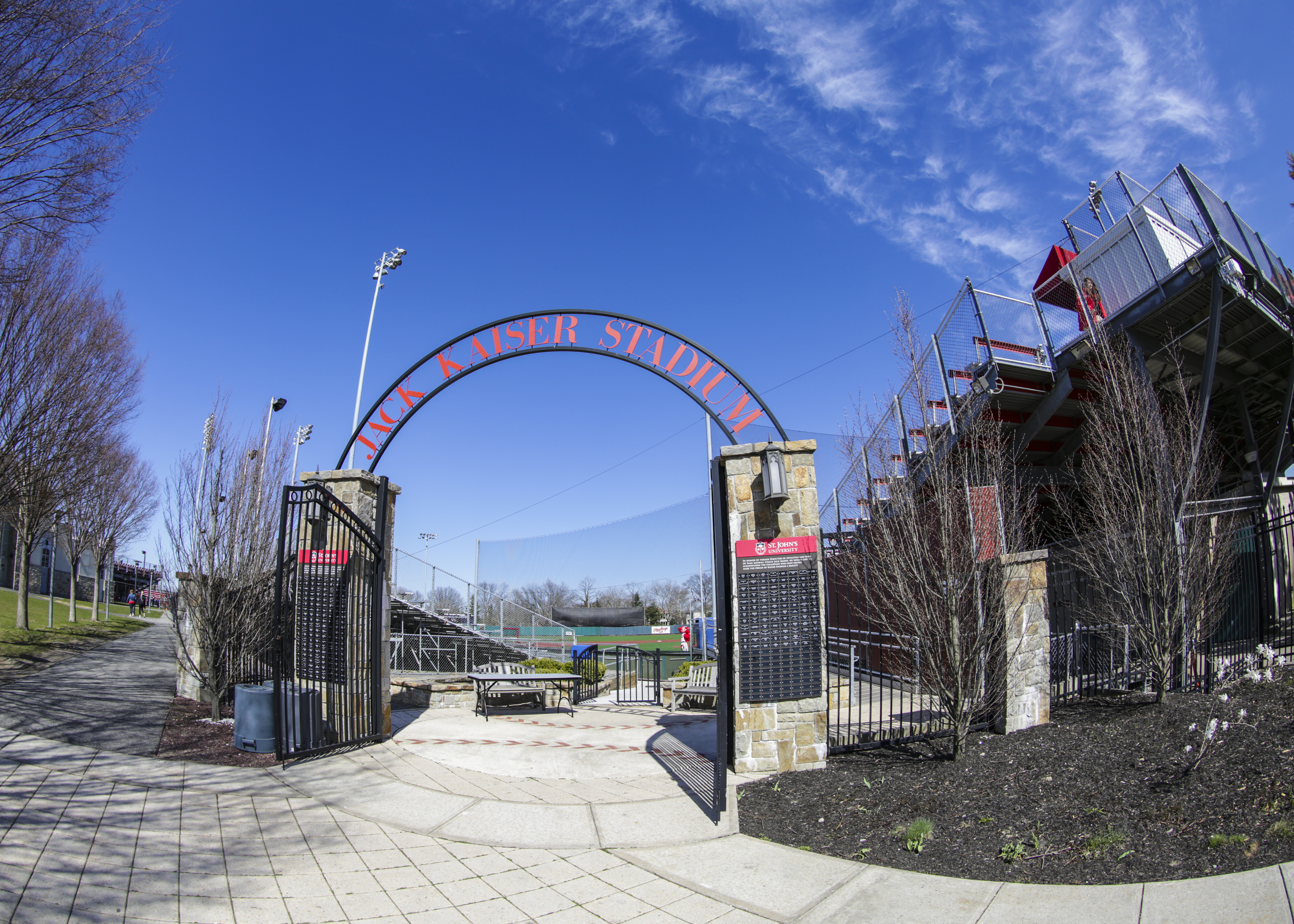
Jack Kaiser Stadium front entrance

== See also ==
- List of NCAA Division I baseball venues
