= Eddie Rodríguez =

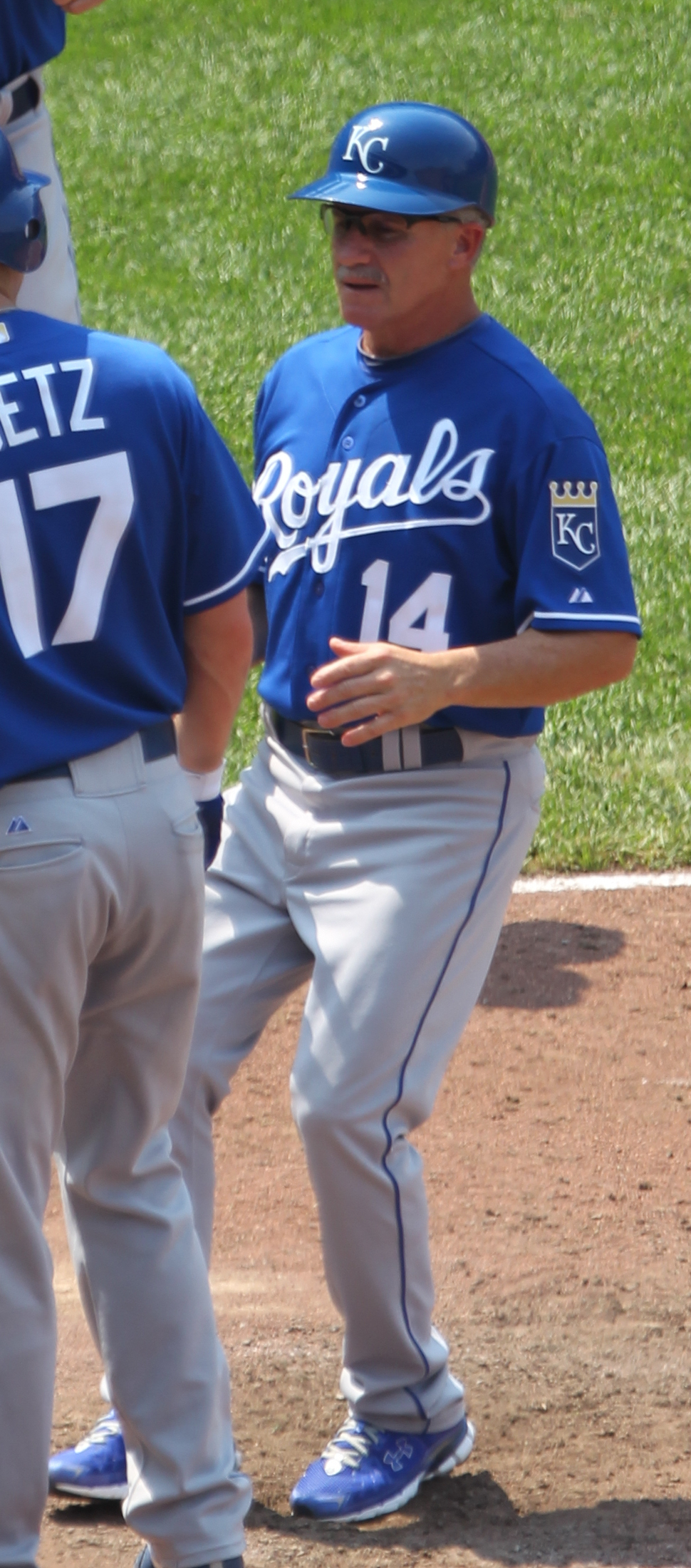
- Rodríguez with the Kansas City Royals in 2011
- Coach
- Born: March 11, 1959 (age 66); Havana, Cuba
- Bats: Right Throws: Right

Teams
- As coach: Los Angeles Angels (1996); Toronto Blue Jays (1998); Arizona Diamondbacks (2001–2003); Montreal Expos/Washington Nationals (2004–2006); Seattle Mariners (2008); Kansas City Royals (2010–2013); Chicago White Sox (2023–2024)

Career highlights and awards
- World Series champion (2001)

Eduardo "Eddie" Rodríguez (born March 11, 1959) is a Cuban former Minor League Baseball player and Major League Baseball (MLB) coach.

== Playing career ==
Rodríguez was drafted as a shortstop by the Baltimore Orioles in 1978 out of Miami High School and spent five seasons in the minors for the Orioles and California Angels.

== Managerial career ==
He then became a coach, scout and manager in the Angels minor league system from 1983-1993 before joining the Toronto Blue Jays organization as a minor league field coordinator, a post he held on and off from 1994-2000. He also served as third base coach for the Blue Jays in 1998. After a stint as third base coach for the US Olympics team in 2000 he served as a coach with the Arizona Diamondbacks, Montreal Expos, and Washington Nationals. He was the manager of the Seattle Mariners Double–A team, the West Tenn Diamond Jaxx, in 2007 and before joining the Mariners for the 2008 season.

Rodríguez managed Team USA in the 2009 Baseball World Cup.

Rodríguez joined the San Diego Padres coaching staff for the 2016 season.

On November 29, 2022, Rodríguez was hired by the Chicago White Sox to serve as the team's third base coach for the 2023 season. On August 8, 2024, Rodríguez was fired by the White Sox.

Sporting positions
Preceded by Bill Lachemann	Quad City Angels Manager; 1987-1989	Succeeded by Don Long
Preceded by Duane Larson	St. Catharines Stompers Manager; 1989	Succeeded by last manager
Preceded by Max Oliveras	Midland Angels Manager; 1990	Succeeded by Don Long
Preceded by Rick Burleson	California Angels Third Base Coach; 1996	Succeeded by Larry Bowa
Preceded by Nick Leyva	Toronto Blue Jays Third Base Coach; 1998	Succeeded by Terry Bevington
Preceded by only manager	Queens Kings Manager; 2000	Succeeded by only manager
Preceded by Dwayne Murphy	Arizona Diamondbacks First Base Coach; 2001	Succeeded by Robin Yount
Preceded by Chris Speier	Arizona Diamondbacks Third Base Coach; 2002-2003	Succeeded by Al Pedrique
Preceded by Brad Mills	Montreal Expos Bench Coach; 2004	Succeeded by none
Preceded by incumbent	Washington Nationals Bench Coach; 2005-2006	Succeeded by Pat Corrales
Preceded by Pat Listach	West Tenn Diamond Jaxx Manager; 2007	Succeeded by Scott Steinmann
Preceded by Gary Thurman	Seattle Mariners First Base Coach; 2008	Succeeded by Lee Tinsley
