= George Taylor Field =

Stadium in St. Catharines, Ontario

Coordinates: 43.143078°N 79.212574°W

- The Box
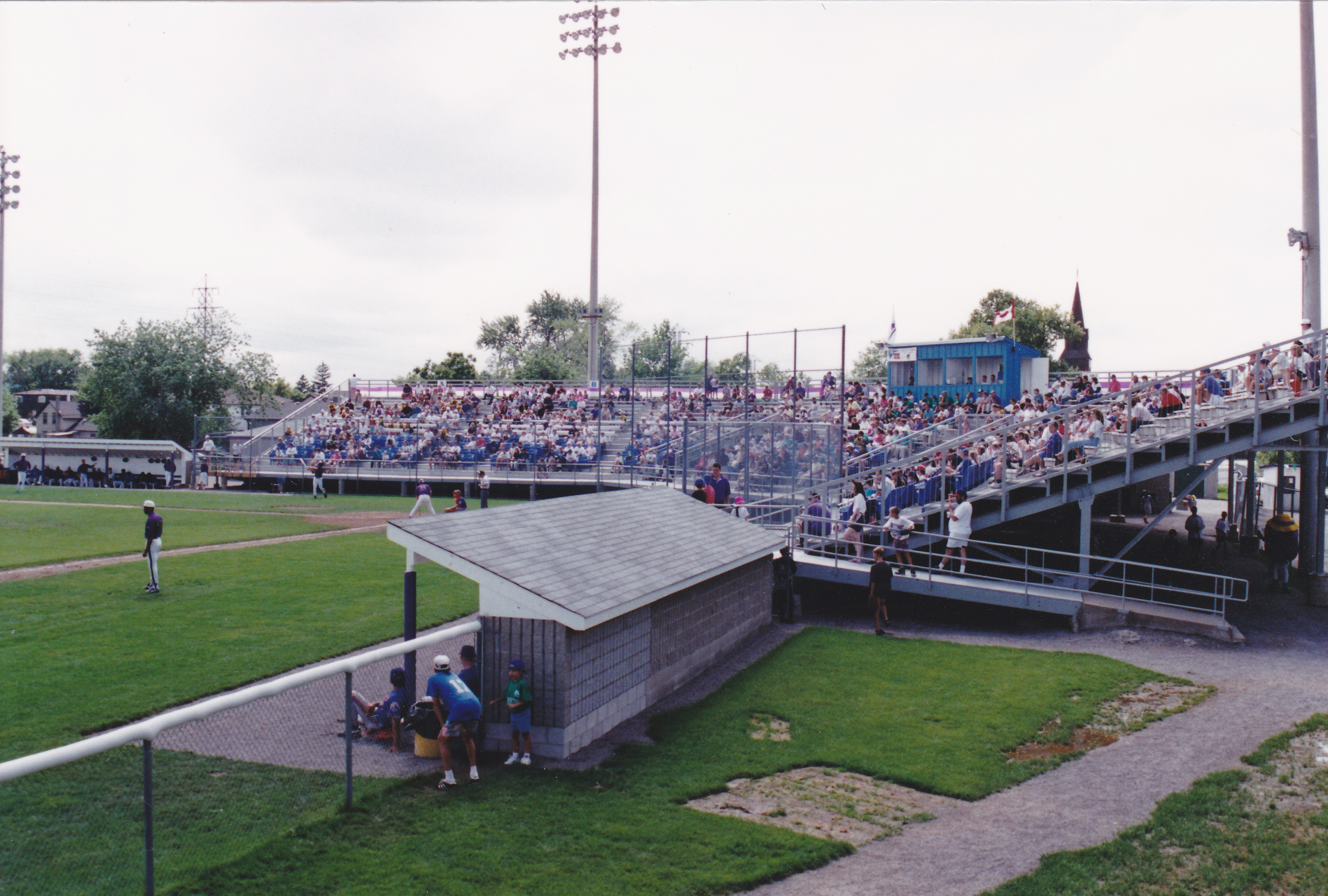
- Interactive map of George Taylor Field
- Location: 4 Seymour Street, St. Catharines, Ontario
- Owner: City of St. Catharines
- Operator: City of St. Catharines
- Capacity: 2,000 (2,500)
- Surface: grass
- Field size: Left Field: 97 metres (318 ft); Center Field: 117 metres (384 ft); Right Field: 97 metres (318 ft) (approximate measurements)

Construction
- Built: 1986
- Opened: 1986

Tenants
- St. Catharines Blue Jays/St. Catharines Stompers (1986–1999); St. Catharines Metros/Niagara Metros (1985–present); Brock Badgers Baseball; Niagara Ironbacks (2025-present); St. Catharines Cobras 16u rep team (2024-present)

Community Park, now known as George Taylor Field, is a stadium in St. Catharines, Ontario, Canada. It is primarily used for baseball and is the home park for the Niagara Metros of the Central Ontario Baseball League (a senior AAA men's baseball league), Brock Badgers Baseball (Brock University) and the Niagara Ironbacks of the Perfect Game Collegiate Baseball League (a summer collegiate league).

It was formerly home to the St. Catharines Blue Jays and St. Catharines Stompers of the Short-Season 'A' affiliate of the Toronto Blue Jays in the New York–Penn League. The ballpark currently has a seating capacity of 2,000 (originally 2,500).

== History ==
The current field and grandstand was opened in 1986 during the first seasons for the Blue Jays. The stadium was built or reconfigured from the former Merritton Community Park baseball field from 1960s.

The park was originally named the Merritton Baseball Field and is now referred to as George Taylor Field renamed in honour of Merritton native and former St. Catharines Blue Jays/St. Catharines Stompers groundskeeper George "Clickey" Taylor.

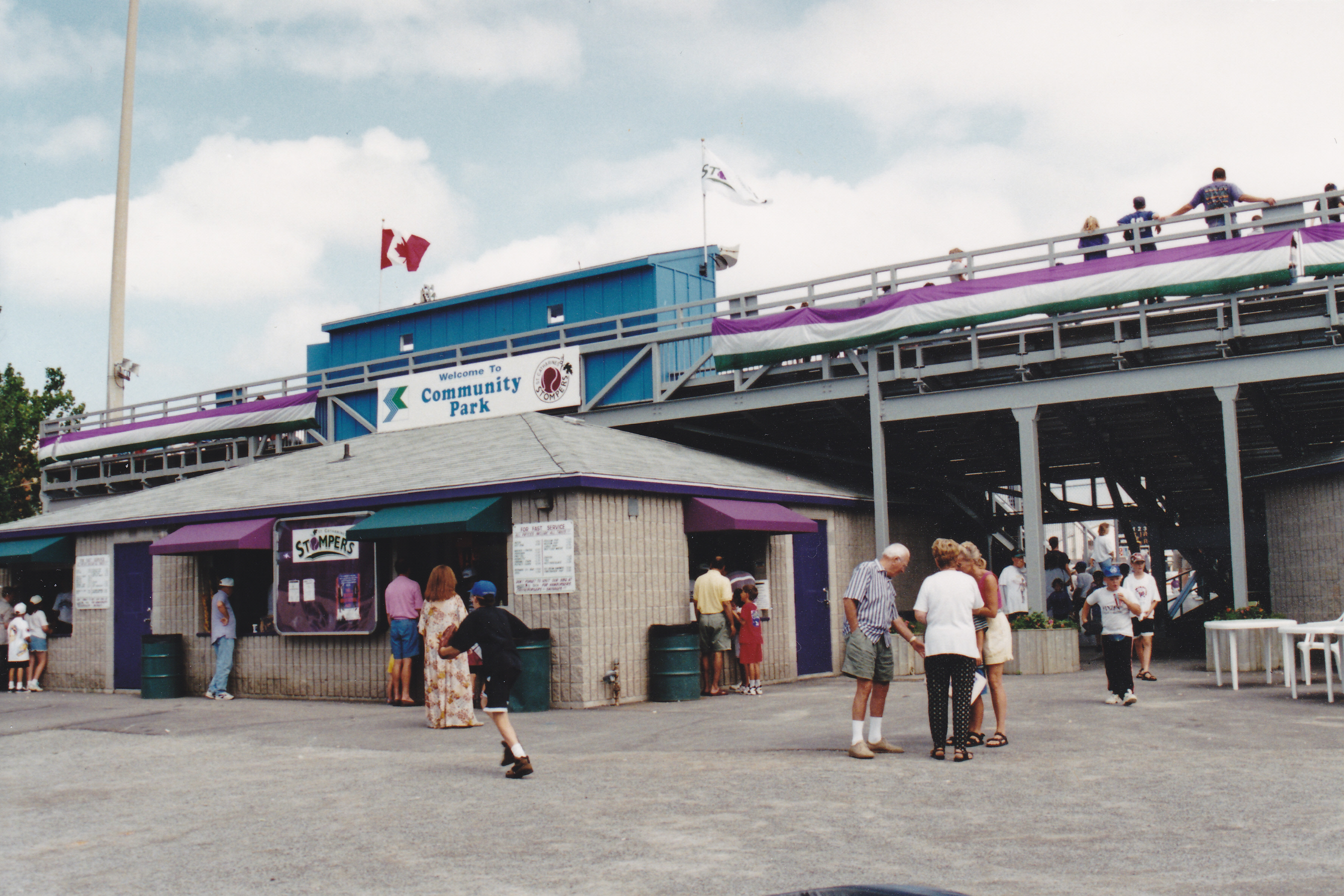
Community Park Concessions
