= Rich Thompson (outfielder) =

American baseball player (born 1979)

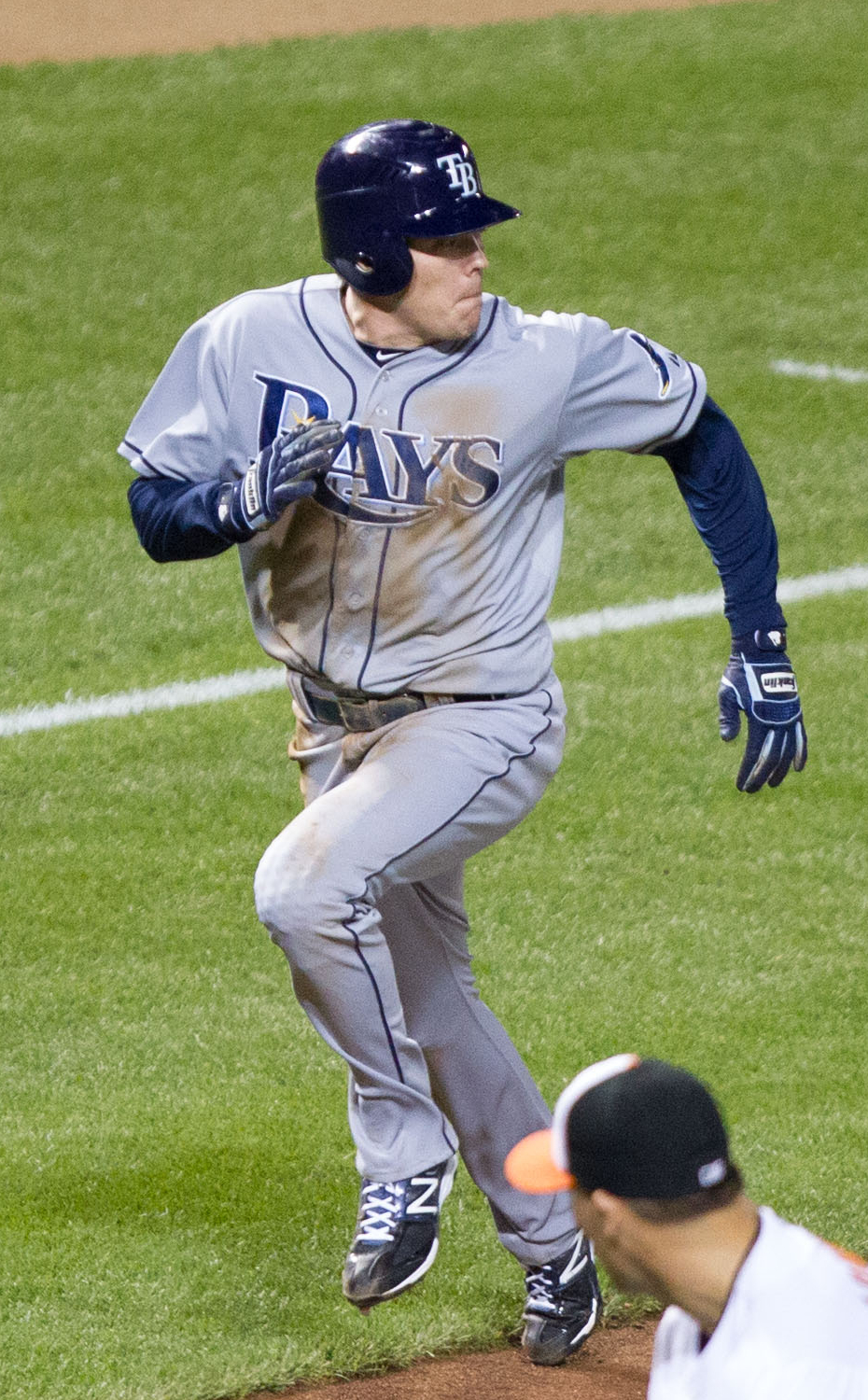
- Thompson with the Tampa Bay Rays
- Outfielder
- Born: April 23, 1979 (age 46); Reading, Pennsylvania, U.S.
- Batted: Left Threw: Right

MLB debut
- April 7, 2004, for the Kansas City Royals

Last MLB appearance
- October 3, 2012, for the Tampa Bay Rays

MLB statistics
- Batting average: .087
- Home runs: 0
- Runs batted in: 1
- Stolen bases: 7
- Stats at Baseball Reference

Teams
- Kansas City Royals (2004); Tampa Bay Rays (2012)

Richard Charles Thompson (born April 23, 1979) is an American professional baseball outfielder, who played in Major League Baseball with the Kansas City Royals in 2004 and the Tampa Bay Rays in 2012. Thompson spent most of his 12-year career playing in Minor League Baseball, and retired in 2013 after a foot and head injury.

== Amateur career ==
Thompson graduated in 1997 from Montrose Area Jr./Sr. High School in Montrose, Pennsylvania. He played on the Montrose Meteors Varsity baseball team. He attended James Madison University in Harrisonburg, Virginia, where he played baseball for the Dukes under head coach Spanky McFarland. He arrived on JMU's campus in the Fall of 1997 and spent the next three years compiling some of the best baseball statistics in the program's history. He was known for his ability to get on base, steal bases and score runs. He remains second all time at JMU for most stolen bases in a career with 99, which is also good for fifth all time in the Colonial Athletic Association. Thompson is second on JMU's list for stolen bases in a season, which he set in 2000 with 50, which is also second-most all time in a season for the CAA. In 1999, he played collegiate summer baseball with the Cotuit Kettleers of the Cape Cod Baseball League and was named a league all-star. In 2000, Thompson was also named Second Team All-CAA, JMU's Most Valuable Player and was also a Virginia Sports Information Directors All State Honorable Mention. Thompson's other appearances in the JMU record book include: fourth for stolen bases in a season (35, 1999), eight for at bats in a season (231, 2000), seventh for runs scored in a season (64, 2000), seventh for triples in a season (5, 2000), fourth for most hit by pitches in a season (17, 2000) eighth all time for career triples (10) and ninth in hit by pitches in a career (25).

== Professional career ==
=== Toronto Blue Jays ===
Thompson was drafted by the Toronto Blue Jays out of James Madison University in the 6th round of the 2000 Major League Baseball draft. He played his first professional season with Toronto's Low-A affiliate, the Queens Kings in 2000.

=== Pittsburgh Pirates ===
The Toronto Blue Jays traded Thompson to the Pittsburgh Pirates in July 2003 for pitcher John Wasdin. Thompson was drafted by the San Diego Padres in the 2003 Rule 5 Draft and was traded to the Kansas City Royals. In April 2004 the Royals returned Thompson to the Pirates. In 2006, while playing for the Triple A Indianapolis Indians, Thompson was an International League Mid Season All Star. He was granted free agency after the 2006 season.

=== Kansas City Royals and Rule 5 Draft ===
Thompson was drafted by the San Diego Padres in the 2003 Rule 5 Draft and was traded to the Kansas City Royals. Thompson made his major league debut for the Kansas City Royals in April 2004 as a Rule 5 Draft pick who mainly entered games to pinch-run. Thompson stole one base and scored one run in five appearances as a pinch runner. His only at-bat was April 20, 2004 against catcher Tim Laker, who was only pitching because the Royals led 15-5, and resulted in the speedy Thompson grounding into a double play. Soon after that game, the Royals returned Thompson to the Pittsburgh Pirates.

=== Arizona Diamondbacks ===
Thompson signed with the Arizona Diamondbacks in October 2006. In 2007, he played for the Tucson Sidewinders, the Diamondbacks Triple-A club.

=== Boston Red Sox ===
Thompson signed a minor league contract with the Boston Red Sox in January 2008, but was released in April before playing a game in the organization.

=== Philadelphia Phillies ===
Thompson signed with the Philadelphia Phillies on April 22, 2008. In 2011, while playing with the Lehigh Valley IronPigs, Thompson was an Milb.com Organization All Star for the Phillies system. On May 16, 2012, he was traded to the Tampa Bay Rays for outfielder Kyle Hudson.

=== Tampa Bay Rays ===
After Thompson's acquisition from the Phillies, he was placed on the active roster, and Brandon Guyer was placed on 15-day DL to make room. Thompson recorded his first major league hit on May 17, 2012 off Boston Red Sox pitcher Felix Doubront. He had 1390 hits in 1388 minor league games prior to his first major league hit. The Rays optioned Thompson to the Triple A Durham Bulls on June 6, 2012, when Desmond Jennings came off the disabled list.

On October 26, 2012, Thompson elected free agency after previously being outrighted off of the 40-man roster. The Rays later signed Thompson to a minor league deal. On June 6, 2013, Thompson broke his foot while fielding a ball during a game which ultimately ended his career.

== Post-baseball career ==
After retiring from baseball, Thompson started a career as a public accountant with KPMG.

In 2014, Thompson started practicing to compete on the NBC competition series American Ninja Warrior. He managed to pass the tryouts, qualifying for the Miami Regionals. In June 2014, he completed the first round qualifying for the Finals which aired on July 28, 2014. However, Thompson couldn't finish the course, having failed to complete the minefield obstacle, and didn't qualify for the next round in Las Vegas.

== Personal life ==
Thompson is married to wife, Teresa. They have three children together. As of 2012, he lived in Tampa, after having moved there in 2005.
