= Roy Hartsfield =

American baseball player and manager (1925–2011)

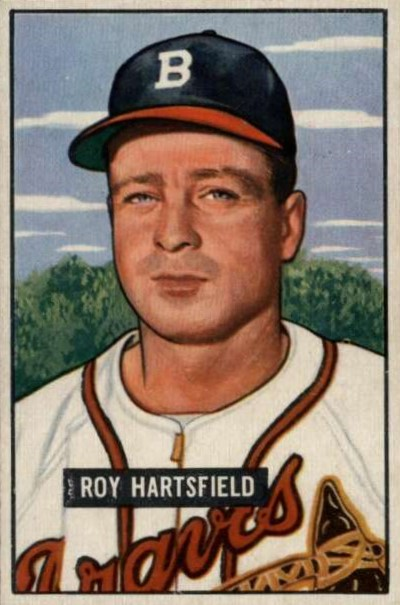
- Second baseman / Manager
- Born: October 25, 1925; Chattahoochee Hills, Georgia, U.S.
- Died: January 15, 2011 (aged 85); Ball Ground, Georgia, U.S.
- Batted: Right Threw: Right

MLB debut
- April 28, 1950, for the Boston Braves

Last MLB appearance
- June 14, 1952, for the Boston Braves

MLB statistics
- Batting average: .273
- Home runs: 13
- Runs batted in: 59
- Managerial record: 166–318
- Winning %: .343
- Stats at Baseball Reference

Teams
- As player: Boston Braves (1950–1952); As manager: Toronto Blue Jays (1977–1979)

Roy Thomas Hartsfield (October 25, 1925 – January 15, 2011) was an American second baseman and manager in Major League Baseball; his MLB playing and managing careers each lasted three years. Hartsfield played his entire major league career with the Boston Braves from 1950 to 1952. He was then traded to the Brooklyn Dodgers for outfielder Andy Pafko.

Hartsfield spent the next 19 years in the Dodgers organization as a minor league player, manager and major league coach. In the latter role, he worked under Los Angeles skipper Walter Alston for three seasons.

He later left the Dodgers organization, and worked with the San Diego Padres organization.

In 1977, he became the first manager of the Toronto Blue Jays, helming the club for its first three seasons.

== Playing career ==
Hartsfield played with the Boston Braves between 1950 and 1952. In 265 career games, he had a .273 batting average, 13 home runs, and 59 runs batted in during his playing career.

== Managerial career ==
=== Early career ===
Hartsfield was a successful manager at top levels of minor league baseball, with the Spokane Indians, then the top farm team of the Los Angeles Dodgers, and the Hawaii Islanders, the San Diego Padres' top affiliate, where he won Pacific Coast League championships in 1975 and 1976. He also coached in the Majors with the Dodgers (1969–72) and Atlanta Braves (briefly in 1973).

=== Toronto Blue Jays ===
In 1977, Peter Bavasi, general manager of the expansion Toronto Blue Jays, hired Hartsfield, whom he had worked with in the Dodgers and Padres organizations, as the Blue Jays' first-ever manager. Hartsfield was quoted two decades later as saying that "the guys I managed the year before in Hawaii (in the triple-A Pacific Coast League) were probably a better team." Hartsfield led the Blue Jays to a 54–107 record in the 1977 season, 45.5 games behind the eventual World Series champion New York Yankees. Notable games from the season include a 9–5 win against the Chicago White Sox on Opening Day and a 19–3 victory over the Yankees on September 10.

The Blue Jays improved slightly in 1978, compiling a 59–103 record, although they still finished the season in last place. The Blue Jays finished second to last in runs scored and earned run average. In 1979, however, the Blue Jays regressed to 53–109, their worst showing yet and the worst showing of any American League team since 1966. Hartsfield was unpopular with the Blue Jays players, and by August the team was in open revolt against him, with players airing their grievances in the media on a near-daily basis.

Having lost over 100 games in each of his three years as manager, and having been very publicly criticized by the Toronto sports media for apparently having lost control of the team, Hartsfield was let go at the conclusion of the 1979 season and replaced by Bobby Mattick. "This year, we should win 10 more games on attitude alone", enthused pitcher Mark Lemongello about the managerial change. In fact, the team improved by 14 games that year.

This would be Hartsfield's only managerial job in Major League Baseball. He compiled a record of 166–318 (.343) in 484 games, giving Hartsfield the worst managerial winning percentage since World War II (among managers with 200 games or more). His teams finished last in the American League East Division in each of his three seasons.

=== Later career ===
Hartsfield managed in the Chicago Cubs organization in 1981, starting the season with the Triple-A Iowa Oaks and finishing with the Double-A Midland Cubs. Both teams ended up with losing records, as did the Triple-A Indianapolis Indians in 1983, which was Hartsfield's final management job.

=== Managerial record ===
Team	Year	Regular season					Postseason			
Team	Year	Games	Won	Lost	Win %	Finish	Won	Lost	Win %	Result
TOR	1977	161	54	107	.335	7th in AL East	—	—	—	—
TOR	1978	161	59	102	.366	7th in AL East	—	—	—	—
TOR	1979	162	53	109	.327	7th in AL East	—	—	—	—
Total		484	166	318	.343	—	0	0	–	—

== Death ==
Hartsfield died of liver cancer at his daughter's home in Ball Ground, Georgia, on January 15, 2011, at 85.
