= Kyle Hudson =

American baseball player and coach (born 1987)

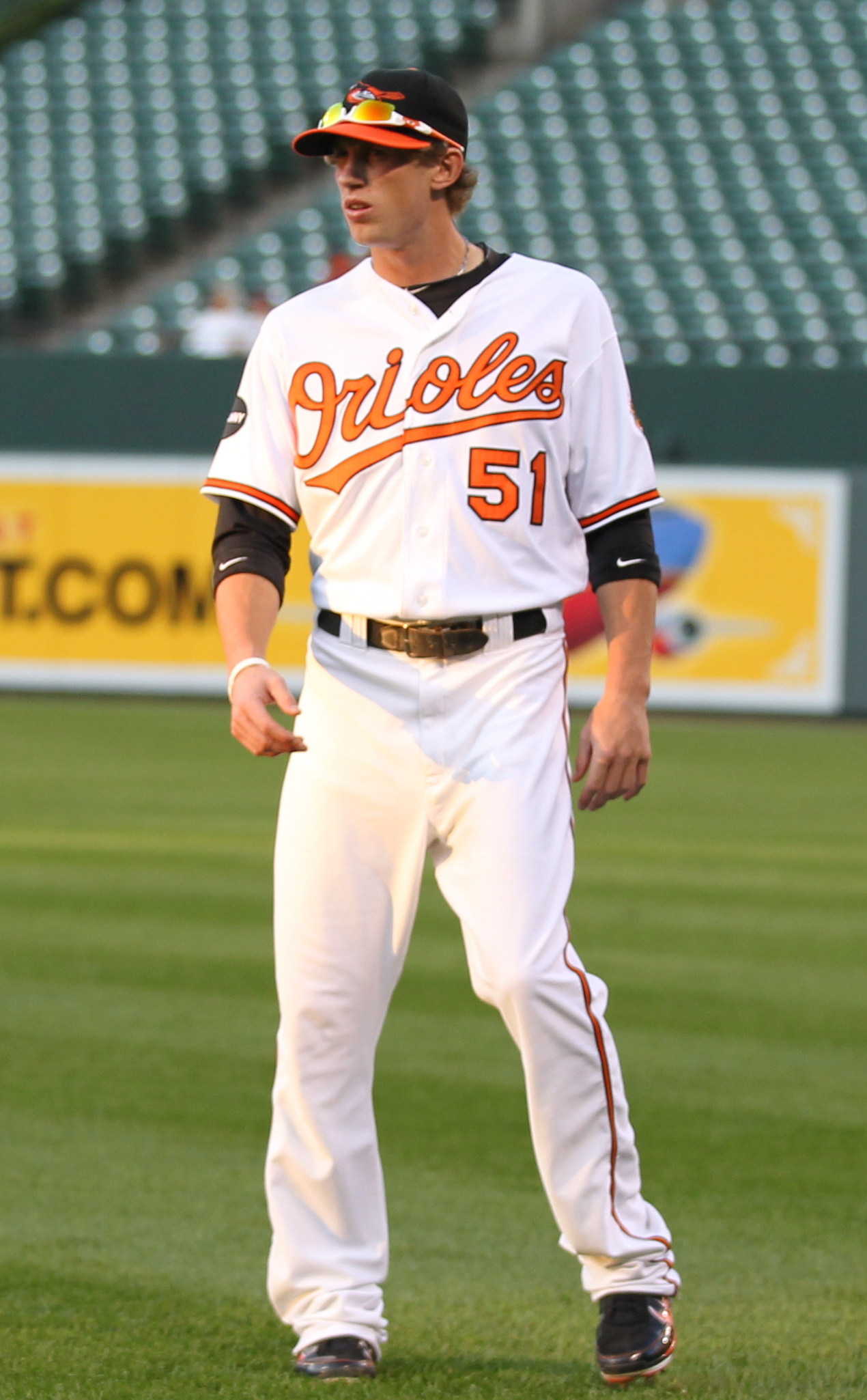
- Hudson with the Baltimore Orioles in 2011

Detroit Tigers
- Outfielder / Coach
- Born: January 7, 1987 (age 39); Mattoon, Illinois, U.S.
- Batted: Left Threw: Left

MLB debut
- September 4, 2011, for the Baltimore Orioles

Last MLB appearance
- September 28, 2011, for the Baltimore Orioles

MLB statistics
- Batting average: .143
- Home runs: 0
- Runs batted in: 2
- Stats at Baseball Reference

Teams
- As player: Baltimore Orioles (2011); As coach: Cleveland Indians / Guardians (2020–2022); Boston Red Sox (2023–2026)

Kyle Jordan Hudson (born January 7, 1987) is an American former professional baseball outfielder who played in Major League Baseball (MLB) for the Baltimore Orioles in 2011. He is the current third base coach for the Detroit Tigers.

== Playing career ==
=== Amateur career ===
Hudson played college baseball and college football at the University of Illinois at Urbana–Champaign. He started at wide receiver for the Fighting Illini from 2005 to 2007.

=== Baltimore Orioles ===
Hudson was drafted by the Baltimore Orioles in the fourth round of the 2008 Major League Baseball draft.

Hudson was called up to the majors for the first time on September 1, 2011.

Hudson was released by the Orioles as of January 17, 2012.

=== Tampa Bay Rays ===
On January 28, 2012, he signed a minor league contract with the Texas Rangers. He also received an invitation to spring training. On March 31, Hudson was traded to the Tampa Bay Rays in exchange for future considerations.

=== Philadelphia Phillies ===
On May 17, 2012, Hudson was traded to the Philadelphia Phillies in exchange for Rich Thompson.

=== Baltimore Orioles (second stint) ===
On February 17, 2013, Hudson signed a minor league contract with the Baltimore Orioles. Hudson made 103 appearances for the Double-A Bowie Baysox during the regular season, batting .292/.386/.317 with 33 RBI and 26 stolen bases.

=== Los Angeles Angels of Anaheim ===
Hudson signed a minor league deal with the Los Angeles Angels of Anaheim in December 2013. On January 22, 2014, he was assigned to the Triple-A Salt Lake Bees. On March 27, Hudson was demoted to the Double-A Arkansas Travelers. He was released by the Angels on July 2.

=== Los Angeles Dodgers ===
Hudson agreed to a job as a volunteer assistant as the University of Illinois in January 2015 though he later, on June 13, 2015, signed a minor league contract with the Los Angeles Dodgers. He appeared in 15 games for the High-A Rancho Cucamonga Quakes and rookie-level Arizona League Dodgers, exclusively as a pinch runner and was released on August 12.

== Coaching career ==
=== Cleveland Guardians ===
Hudson served as bench coach for the Columbus Clippers, the Triple-A affiliate of the Cleveland Indians, in 2019. Hudson was promoted to the Indians' major league coaching staff for the 2020 season, serving as staff assistant.

=== Boston Red Sox ===
On January 4, 2023, Hudson was named the first base coach and outfield instructor for the Boston Red Sox. After one season as first base coach, Hudson was named the Red Sox' third base coach in January 2024. He was fired on April 25, 2026.

=== Detroit Tigers ===
On November 4, 2026, Hudson was hired to serve as the first base coach for the Detroit Tigers.

Preceded by Ramón Vázquez	Boston Red Sox first base coach 2023	Succeeded by Andy Fox
Preceded by Carlos Febles	Boston Red Sox third base coach 2024–2026	Succeeded by Chad Epperson
