= Queens Kings =

- 2000; Queens, New York City
Team logo
Cap insignia

Minor league affiliations
- Class: Short-Season A (2000)
- League: New York–Penn League (2000)
- Division: McNamara

Major league affiliations
- Team: Toronto Blue Jays (2000)

Team data
- Colors: Purple, green, gold, white
- Mascot: Elvis the Lion
- Ballpark: The Ballpark at St. Johns (2000)

The Queens Kings were the Toronto Blue Jays' Short-Season A classification team in the New York–Penn League in the 2000 season. The team was formerly the St. Catharines Stompers and was sold by the Blue Jays and relocated to Queens, New York City, New York and played at The Ballpark at St. Johns. The following season (2001), the team moved to the New York City borough of Brooklyn and became the Brooklyn Cyclones, an affiliate of the New York Mets. Of note, Alex Ríos, who earned a spot on the 2006 and 2007 American League All Star Roster, played his first season in professional baseball with the Queens Kings. Other former Queens Kings to reach the majors include Cleveland Indians catcher Guillermo Quiróz and former pitcher Brandon Lyon. Mike Smith also played for the Kings. Rich Thompson led the team in hits and stolen bases.

== Franchise record ==
Year	Record	Finish	Manager	Playoffs
2000	46-29	3rd	Eddie Rodríguez	Lost in 1st round
