= Bobby Brown (outfielder) =

American baseball player (born 1954)

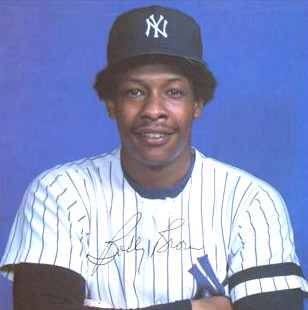
- Brown in 1981
- Outfielder
- Born: May 25, 1954 (age 70); Norfolk, Virginia, U.S.
- Batted: Switch Threw: Right

MLB debut
- April 5, 1979, for the Toronto Blue Jays

Last MLB appearance
- October 5, 1985, for the San Diego Padres

MLB statistics
- Batting average: .245
- Home runs: 26
- Runs batted in: 130
- Stats at Baseball Reference

Teams
- Toronto Blue Jays (1979); New York Yankees (1979–1981); Seattle Mariners (1982); San Diego Padres (1983–1985)

Rogers Lee Brown (born May 25, 1954) is an American former Major League Baseball player who played outfield in the major leagues from 1979-1985. Brown played for the Toronto Blue Jays (1979), New York Yankees (1979-1981), Seattle Mariners (1982) and San Diego Padres (1983-1985)

In 502 games, Brown accumulated 110 stolen bases, 313 hits, 26 home runs, 130 RBI, and a .245 batting average.

He and Jay Johnstone were sent from the Phillies to the Yankees for Rawly Eastwick on the day before the trade deadline on June 14, 1978.

His best season came in 1980 with the Yankees, when he hit 14 home runs, with 47 runs batted in and 27 stolen bases. He also played in two World Series during his career (1981 for the Yankees, and 1984 for the Padres).
