= St. Catharines Blue Jays =

- 1986–1999; St. Catharines, Ontario

Minor league affiliations
- Class: Class A Short Season (1986–1999)
- League: New York–Penn League (1986–1999)

Major league affiliations
- Team: Toronto Blue Jays (1986–1999)

Minor league titles
- League titles: 1986
- Division titles: 1986

Team data
- Name: St. Catharines Stompers (1995–1999); St. Catharines Blue Jays (1986–1994)
- Ballpark: Community Park (1986–1999)
- Owner/ Operator: Terrence O'Malley

The St. Catharines Blue Jays were a minor league baseball team which played at Community Park in St. Catharines, Ontario. They were the Short-Season A affiliate of the Toronto Blue Jays in the New York–Penn League.

== History ==
The team began play in 1986 as the Blue Jays, though were later renamed the St. Catharines Stompers in 1995. The team left St. Catharines after the 1999 season to become the Queens Kings in 2000.

On 4 July 2007, it was reported in the St. Catharines Standard the Stompers were going to return in the summer of 2008. Former team owner, Terrence O'Malley was quoted as saying: "the Stompers are back ... We'll be playing at Community Park beginning next summer." This article prompted a number of responses, though, in the end, this turned out to be only a satirical piece.

The Blue Jays won the New York-Penn league title in 1986.

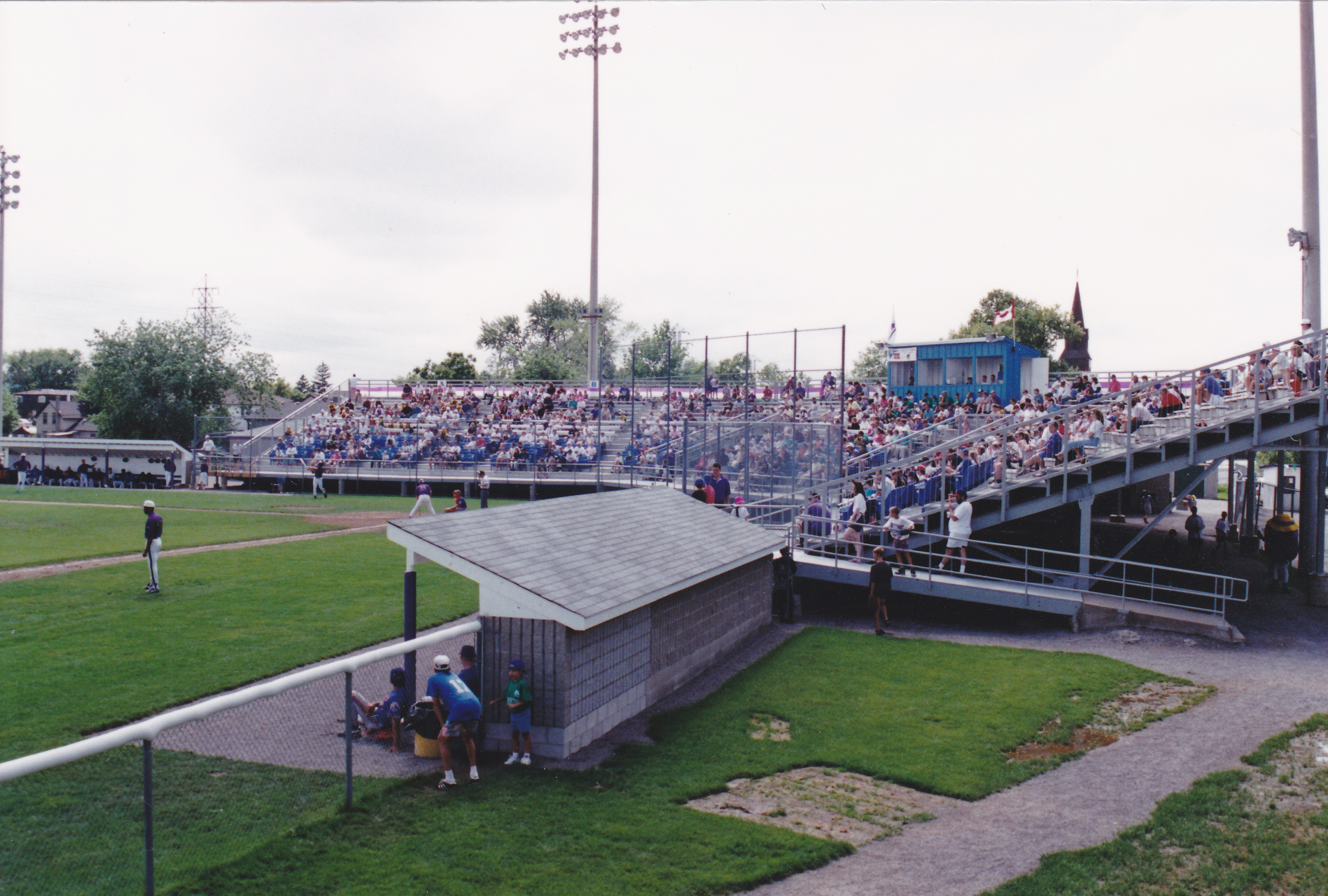
St. Catharines Stompers at Community Park - August 1995

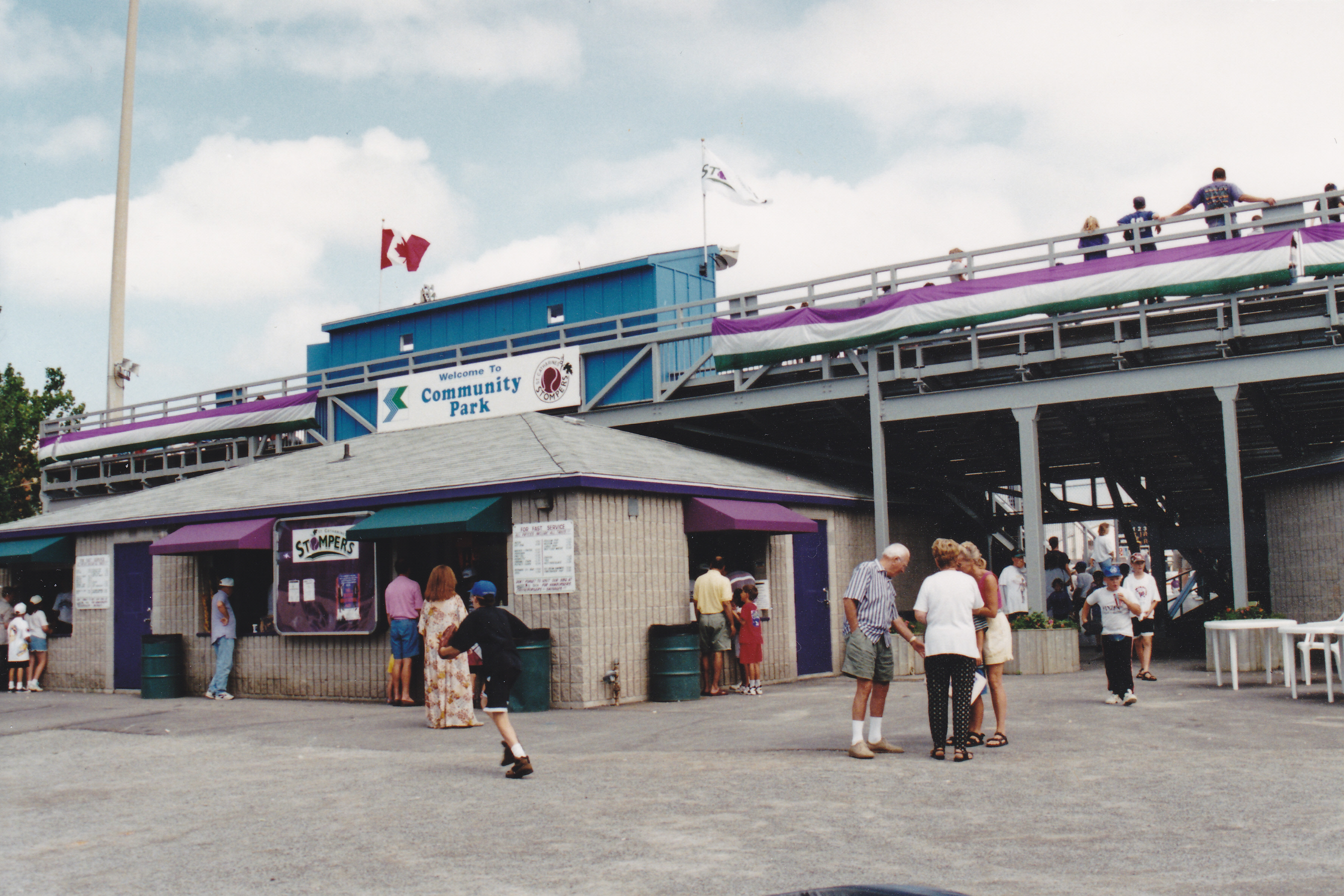
Community Park Concessions

== Notable players ==
Player	Achievements	Year in St. Catharines
Pat Hentgen	1993 World Series champion, 1996 AL Cy Young Award Winner, 3× All-Star, 2016 Canadian Baseball Hall of Fame	1986
Carlos Delgado	2× All-Star, 2015 Canadian Baseball Hall of Fame	1989
Jeff Kent	5× All-Star, 2000 NL MVP	1989
Chris Weinke	2000 Heisman Trophy winner	1991
Vernon Wells	3× All-Star	1997

== Managers ==
- Cloyd Boyer 1986
- Joe Lonnett 1987
- Eddie Dennis 1988
- Bob Shirley 1989
- Doug Ault 1990–1991
- Joe Cannon 1992–1995

As Stompers

- Rocket Wheeler 1996–1997
- Duane Larson 1998
- Eddie Rodriguez 1999
