= Ted Wilborn =

American baseball player

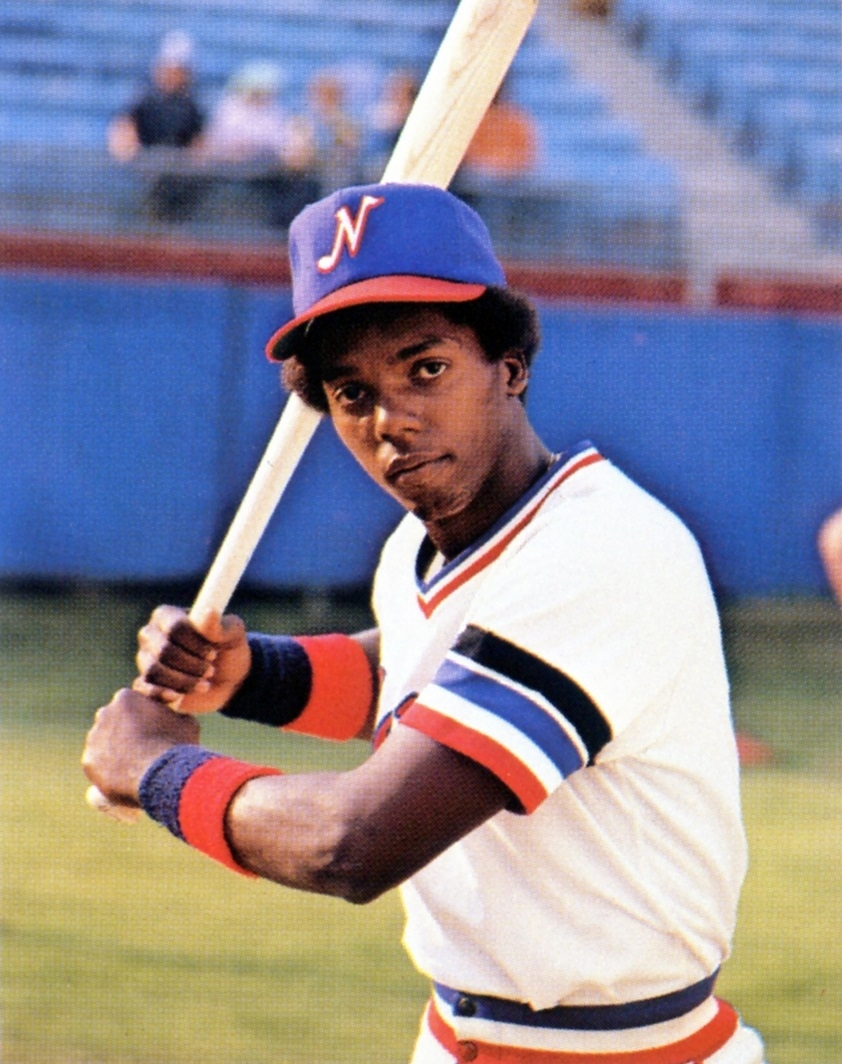
- Wilborn with the Nashville Sounds in 1980
- Outfielder
- Born: December 16, 1958 (age 67); Waco, Texas, U.S.
- Batted: Switch Threw: Right

MLB debut
- April 5, 1979, for the Toronto Blue Jays

Last MLB appearance
- October 5, 1980, for the New York Yankees

MLB statistics
- Batting average: .100
- Runs: 5
- Hits: 2
- Stats at Baseball Reference

Teams
- Toronto Blue Jays (1979); New York Yankees (1980)

Thaddeaus Inglehart Wilborn (born December 16, 1958) is an American former Major League Baseball outfielder. He played during two seasons at the major league level for the Toronto Blue Jays and New York Yankees, having been selected by the Yankees in the fourth round of the 1976 amateur draft. Wilborn played his first professional season with their Class A (Short Season) Oneonta Yankees in 1976, was traded to Toronto, then returned to the Yankees. Wilborn was traded to the San Francisco Giants in 1982, but was then sent down to the minor leagues. He split his last season (1987) between two Baltimore Orioles' minor league teams: the Class A (Advanced) Miami Marlins and the Triple-A Rochester Red Wings.
