= Ross Baumgarten =

American baseball player (born 1955)

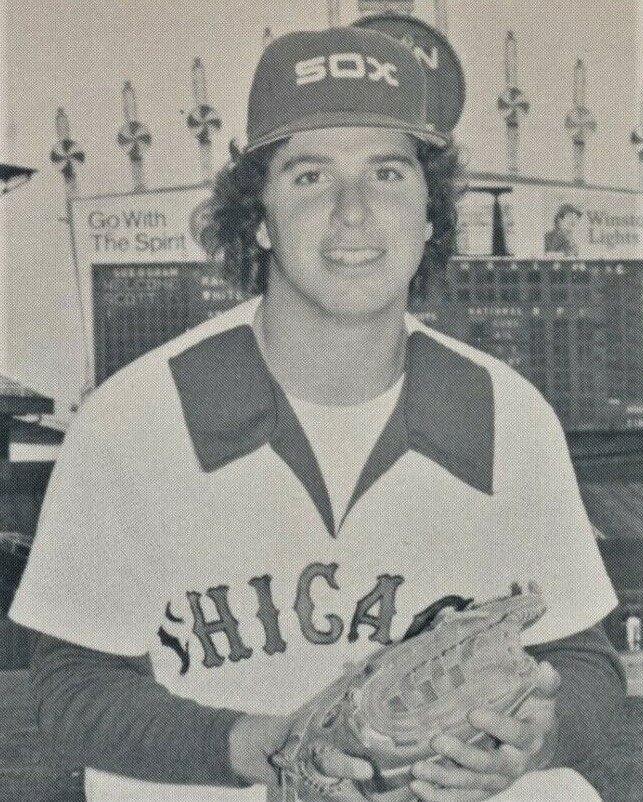
- Pitcher
- Born: May 27, 1955 (age 71); Highland Park, Illinois, U.S.
- Batted: Left Threw: Left

MLB debut
- August 16, 1978, for the Chicago White Sox

Last MLB appearance
- August 23, 1982, for the Pittsburgh Pirates

MLB statistics
- Win–loss record: 22–36
- Earned run average: 4.02
- Strikeouts: 222
- Stats at Baseball Reference

Teams
- Chicago White Sox (1978–1981); Pittsburgh Pirates (1982)

Ross Baumgarten (born May 27, 1955) is an American former professional baseball player who was a pitcher in Major League Baseball for five seasons in the late 1970s and early 1980s. Baumgarten played for the Chicago White Sox from 1978 to 1981, and Pittsburgh Pirates in 1982.

== Early years ==
Baumgarten was born in Highland Park, Illinois, and is Jewish. He attended New Trier High School, in Winnetka, Illinois.

== College career ==
He attended Florida Southern College in Lakeland, Florida, and Palm Beach Community College in Lake Worth, Florida.

Baumgarten then attended the University of Florida in Gainesville, Florida. In 1976, he played collegiate summer baseball with the Hyannis Mets of the Cape Cod Baseball League. He was a left-handed starting pitcher for coach Jay Bergman's Florida Gators baseball team in 1977. He was drafted by the Chicago White Sox in the twentieth round of the 1977 Major League Baseball draft.

== Professional career ==
While pitching for the White Sox's Appleton, Wisconsin minor league club in 1978, Baumgarten was 9–1 with a 1.82 earned run average (ERA) as a starting pitcher, and earned promotion to the White Sox major league club.

Baumgarten posted a win–loss record of 13–8 in 1979, and was sixth in the American League with three shutouts. He finished fourth in American League Rookie of the Year voting, and was voted to the 1979 Topps All-Star Rookie Team. On July 2, 1980, Baumgarten pitched a one-hitter for the White Sox against the California Angels. The lone Angels hit was a single by Rod Carew in the top of the seventh inning, and the White Sox won the game, 1–0.

In March 1982, the White Sox traded Baumgarten, together with Butch Edge, to the Pittsburgh Pirates in exchange for Ernie Camacho and Vance Law. After one season in Pittsburgh, his major league career ended.

== Life after baseball ==
Ross works at Robert W. Baird & Co. in Chicago on a team of financial advisers, as well as a baseball coach at New Trier High School.

== See also ==
- List of Florida Gators baseball players
- List of Jewish Major League Baseball players
