= Butch Edge =

American baseball player (born 1956)

- Pitcher
- Born: July 18, 1956 (age 70); Houston, Texas, U.S.
- Batted: Right Threw: Right

MLB debut
- August 13, 1979, for the Toronto Blue Jays

Last MLB appearance
- September 28, 1979, for the Toronto Blue Jays

MLB statistics
- Win–loss record: 3–4
- Earned run average: 5.23
- Strikeouts: 19
- Stats at Baseball Reference

Teams
- Toronto Blue Jays (1979)

Claude Lee Edge (born July 18, 1956) is an American former professional baseball pitcher. He played in Major League Baseball for the Toronto Blue Jays during the 1979 season.

== Career ==
Edge graduated from El Camino High School in Sacramento, California and was featured in Faces in the Crowd in the June 24, 1974 issue of Sports Illustrated. He was drafted by the Milwaukee Brewers as the sixth pick overall of the 1974 amateur draft. Edge was selected by the Toronto Blue Jays in the 1976 Major League Baseball expansion draft.

Edge played his only season in the Major Leagues in 1979, in which the 6'3" right-hander made nine starts for the Blue Jays. He pitched 51 2/3 innings, won three games, lost four, completed one game, gave up 60 hits, 30 earned runs (for a 5.23 earned run average), walked 24 batters, and struck out 19.

The Blue Jays released Edge prior to the start of the 1980 season. On April 10, he signed as a free agent with the Atlanta Braves. Edge spent two seasons with Atlanta's Triple-A affiliate, the Richmond Braves.

Before the 1982 season, Edge was traded from the Braves to the Chicago White Sox for Mike Colbern. Chicago then packaged Edge with Ross Baumgarten in a trade to the Pittsburgh Pirates for Vance Law and Ernie Camacho.
