= Pedro Hernández (infielder) =

Dominican baseball player (born 1959)

- Third baseman
- Born: April 4, 1959 (age 65); La Romana, Dominican Republic
- Batted: Right Threw: Right

MLB debut
- September 8, 1979, for the Toronto Blue Jays

Last MLB appearance
- July 11, 1982, for the Toronto Blue Jays

MLB statistics
- Batting average: .000
- Home runs: 0
- Runs batted in: 0
- Stats at Baseball Reference

Teams
- Toronto Blue Jays (1979, 1982)

Pedro Julio Montas Hernández (born April 4, 1959) is a Dominican former professional baseball player.

Hernández was born in La Romana, Dominican Republic, and attended of Xaverian High School in Brooklyn, New York. He was signed by the Houston Astros as an amateur free agent in 1976.

Hernández played for the Toronto Blue Jays of Major League Baseball (MLB) in 1979 and 1982. He also played for 12 minor league teams in 1977–1982 and 1984–85.
