= Benny Distefano =

American baseball player (born 1962)

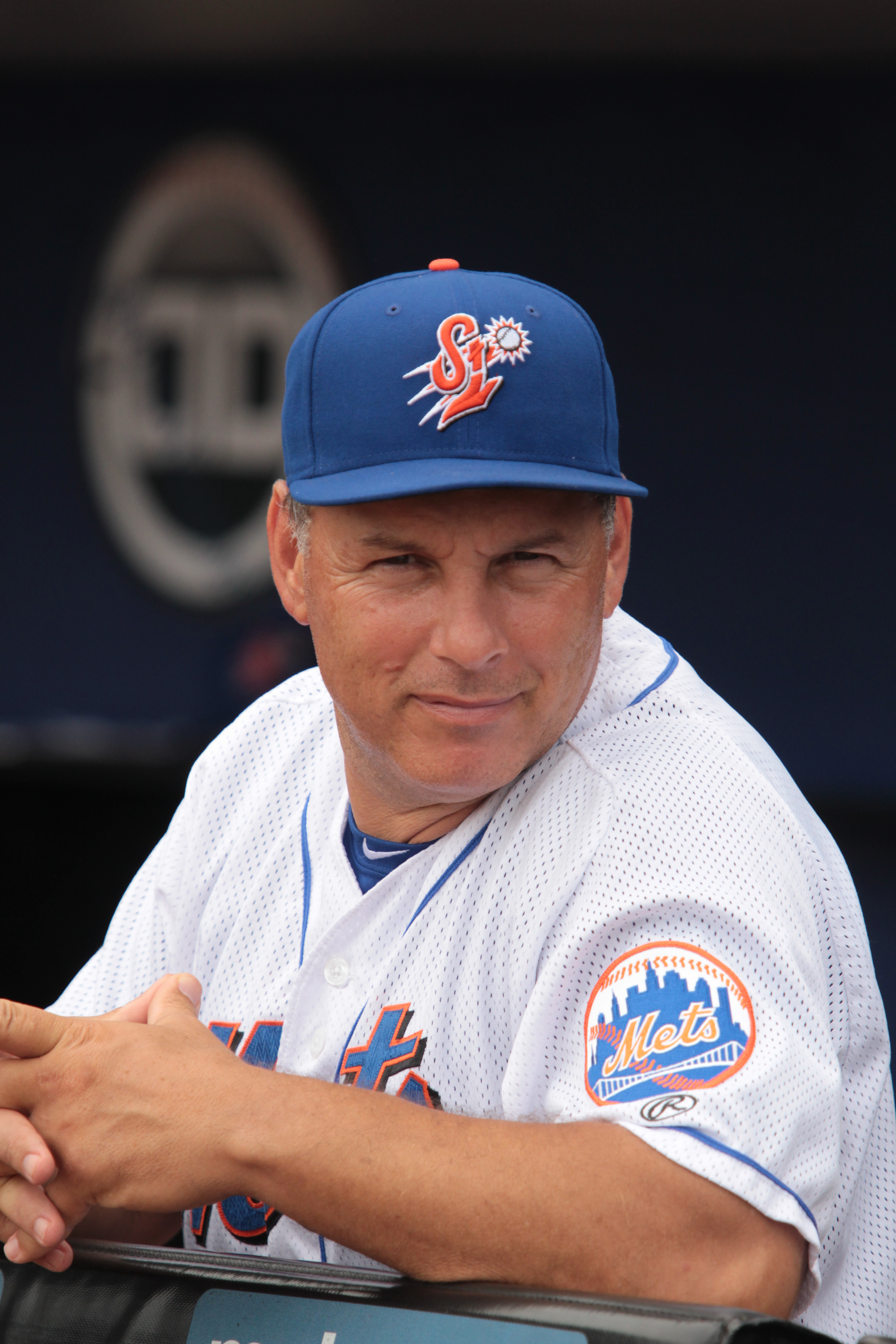
- Distefano in 2012
- First baseman / Right Fielder / Catcher
- Born: January 23, 1962 (age 64); Brooklyn, New York, U.S.
- Batted: Left Threw: Left

MLB debut
- May 18, 1984, for the Pittsburgh Pirates

Last MLB appearance
- August 5, 1992, for the Houston Astros

MLB statistics
- Batting average: .228
- Home runs: 5
- Runs batted in: 28
- Stats at Baseball Reference

Teams
- Pittsburgh Pirates (1984, 1986, 1988–1989); Chunichi Dragons (1990); Houston Astros (1992)

Benito James Distefano (born January 23, 1962) is an American former professional baseball player. He played in Major League Baseball (MLB) with the Pittsburgh Pirates and Houston Astros and in Nippon Professional Baseball for the Chunichi Dragons. He made his MLB debut in 1984 and played his last game in 1992.

== Biography ==
Distefano attended Lafayette High School in Brooklyn, New York, followed by college at Alvin Community College in Alvin, Texas. Distefano was drafted by the Pittsburgh Pirates in the second round of the 1981 MLB June Draft-Secondary Phase.

Distefano remains the most recent left-handed-throwing player to catch an MLB game, catching in three separate games for the Pirates in 1989.

On April 28, 1992, David Cone of the New York Mets brought a no-hitter into the eighth inning. Distefano broke it up with an infield hit.

In 2010, Distefano was hired by the New York Mets to serve as the hitting coach for the Single A Brooklyn Cyclones. After serving as the hitting coach for the Class A St. Lucie Mets of the Florida State League for a few years, Distefano returned to Brooklyn for the 2014 season.

Distefano was named as the bench coach for the Syracuse Mets of the New York Mets organization for the 2019 season. In the 2020 and 2021 seasons, Distefano was a roving instructor in the Mets' system.

Distefano is in the Houston area hosting a boys baseball camp annually.
