= Duane Larson =

- Infielder
- Born: 1948 (age 77–78)
- Bats: Both Throws: Right

Duane Carl Larson (born December 6, 1948) is an American former minor league baseball infielder and manager and is currently a Major League scout and special assistant to the General Manager in the Atlanta Braves organization.

Larson came to the Braves organization in 2003 from the Toronto Blue Jays, where he worked in scouting and player development for 26 years. Larson joined the Blue Jays organization in 1977, working as a minor league scout and manager of Utica in the New York–Penn League.

The former infielder played in the Padres farm system from 1972 to 1976, and began coaching as a player/coach with Reno of the California League during the 1975-76 seasons. Larson was the skipper for the Carolina League Kinston Eagles in 1979. From 1982 to 1984, Larson managed at Medicine Hat, where he led the team to a Pioneer League championship in 1982. In 1985 Larson became a scouting supervisor and was named a special assignment scout in 1994. Larson was honored in 1996 with the Toronto Blue Jays Al LaMacchia Award for excellence in scouting.

Larson graduated from the University of Santa Clara, majoring in economics. He played with the Alaska Goldpanners of Fairbanks during the summer seasons of 1970 and 1971. In 1970, he hit .335 and was named the team MVP. In 1971, Larson hit .310 and set the team's single-season stolen base record with 47, beating the previous record of 35 by Doug Hunt in 1969. He also helped the Goldpanners to a runner-up finish at the 1971 National Baseball Congress World Series. In 1973, Larson was selected to the all-time Goldpanner all-star team by a fan vote.

He lives in Knoxville, Tennessee.
