= 1979 Cleveland Indians season =

1979 Cleveland Indians
- League: American League
- Division: East
- Ballpark: Cleveland Municipal Stadium
- City: Cleveland, Ohio
- Owners: Steve O'Neill
- General managers: Phil Seghi
- Managers: Jeff Torborg, Dave Garcia
- Television: WJKW
- Radio: WWWE

The 1979 Cleveland Indians season was the 79th season for the franchise, the 65th as the Indians and the 48th season at Cleveland Stadium. They improved upon their 69–90 campaign from the previous season, but missed the playoffs for the 25th consecutive season, finishing the season at 81–80.

== Offseason ==
- October 3, 1978: Larvell Blanks and Jim Kern were traded by the Indians to the Texas Rangers for Len Barker and Bobby Bonds.
- December 5, 1978: Carmen Castillo was drafted by the Indians from the Philadelphia Phillies in the 1978 minor league draft.
- December 6, 1978: Cardell Camper was traded by the Indians to the Philadelphia Phillies for Joe Charboneau.

== Regular season ==
=== Season standings ===
AL East
Team	W	L	Pct.	GB	Home	Road
Baltimore Orioles	102	57	.642	—	55‍–‍24	47‍–‍33
Milwaukee Brewers	95	66	.590	8	52‍–‍29	43‍–‍37
Boston Red Sox	91	69	.569	11½	51‍–‍29	40‍–‍40
New York Yankees	89	71	.556	13½	51‍–‍30	38‍–‍41
Detroit Tigers	85	76	.528	18	46‍–‍34	39‍–‍42
Cleveland Indians	81	80	.503	22	47‍–‍34	34‍–‍46
Toronto Blue Jays	53	109	.327	50½	32‍–‍49	21‍–‍60

=== Record vs. opponents ===
1979 American League record Sources:
Team	BAL	BOS	CAL	CWS	CLE	DET	KC	MIL	MIN	NYY	OAK	SEA	TEX	TOR
Baltimore	—	8–5	9–3	8–3	8–5	7–6	6–6	8–5	8–4	5–6	8–4	10–2	6–6	11–2
Boston	5–8	—	5–7	5–6	6–7	8–5	8–4	8–4	9–3	5–8	9–3	8–4	6–6	9–4
California	3–9	7–5	—	9–4	6–6	4–8	7–6	7–5	9–4	7–5	10–3	7–6	5–8	7–5
Chicago	3–8	6–5	4–9	—	6–6	3–9	5–8	5–7	5–8	4–8	9–4	5–8	11–2	7–5
Cleveland	5–8	7–6	6–6	6–6	—	6–6	6–6	4–9	8–4	5–8	8–4	7–5	5–7	8–5
Detroit	6–7	5–8	8–4	9–3	6–6	—	5–7	6–7	4–8	7–6	7–5	7–5	6–6	9–4
Kansas City	6–6	4–8	6–7	8–5	6–6	7–5	—	5–7	7–6	5–7	9–4	7–6	6–7	9–3
Milwaukee	5–8	4–8	5–7	7–5	9–4	7–6	7–5	—	8–4	9–4	6–6	9–3	9–3	10–3
Minnesota	4–8	3–9	4–9	8–5	4–8	8–4	6–7	4–8	—	7–5	9–4	10–3	4–9	11–1
New York	6–5	8–5	5–7	8–4	8–5	6–7	7–5	4–9	5–7	—	9–3	6–6	8–4	9–4
Oakland	4–8	3–9	3–10	4–9	4–8	5–7	4–9	6–6	4–9	3–9	—	8–5	2–11	4–8
Seattle	2–10	4–8	6–7	8–5	5–7	5–7	6–7	3–9	3–10	6–6	5–8	—	6–7	8–4
Texas	6–6	6–6	8–5	2–11	7–5	6–6	7–6	3–9	9–4	4–8	11–2	7–6	—	7–5
Toronto	2–11	4–9	5–7	5–7	5–8	4–9	3–9	3–10	1–11	4–9	8–4	4–8	5–7	—

=== Notable transactions ===
- June 5, 1979: Von Hayes was drafted by the Indians in the 7th round of the 1979 Major League Baseball draft. Player signed August 24, 1979.
- July 18, 1979: Mike Stanton was signed as a free agent by the Indians.

=== Opening Day Lineup ===
Opening Day Starters
#	Name	Position
11	Toby Harrah	3B
27	Jim Norris	DH
25	Bobby Bonds	RF
29	Andre Thornton	1B
35	Gary Alexander	C
22	Ted Cox	LF
18	Duane Kuiper	2B
21	Tom Veryzer	SS
20	Horace Speed	CF
40	Rick Wise	P

=== Roster ===
1979 Cleveland Indians
Roster
Pitchers: 42 Larry Andersen; 39 Len Barker; 32 David Clyde; 23 Víctor Cruz; 17 Wayne Garland; 44 Don Hood; 43 Sid Monge; 48 Mike Paxton; 41 Paul Reuschel; 37 Dan Spillner; 36 Rick Waits; 56 Sandy Wihtol; 33 Eric Wilkins; 40 Rick Wise	Catchers: 35 Gary Alexander; 16 Bo Díaz; 9 Ron Hassey; 44 Cliff Johnson; Infielders: 31 Wayne Cage; 22 Ted Cox; 11 Toby Harrah; 18 Duane Kuiper; 12 Dave Rosello; 29 Andre Thornton; 21,15 Tom Veryzer	Outfielders: 30 Dell Alston; 25 Bobby Bonds; 00 Paul Dade; 21 Mike Hargrove; 28 Rick Manning; 27 Jim Norris; 13 Ron Pruitt; 20 Horace Speed	Manager: 10 Jeff Torborg (April 5 - July 22); 1 Dave Garcia (July 23 - Sept. 30); Coaches: 4 Dave Duncan (Bullpen); 1 Dave Garcia (Third Base); 2 Chuck Hartenstein (Pitching); 24 Joe Nossek (First Base)

== Player stats ==
=== Batting ===
Note: G = Games played; AB = At bats; R = Runs scored; H = Hits; 2B = Doubles; 3B = Triples; HR = Home runs; RBI = Runs batted in; AVG = Batting average; SB = Stolen bases

Player	G	AB	R	H	2B	3B	HR	RBI	AVG	SB
Gary Alexander	110	358	54	82	9	2	15	54	.229	4
Dell Alston	54	62	10	18	0	2	1	12	.290	4
Bobby Bonds	146	538	93	148	24	1	25	85	.275	34
Wayne Cage	29	56	6	13	2	0	1	6	.232	0
Ted Cox	78	189	17	40	6	0	4	22	.212	3
Paul Dade	44	170	22	48	4	1	3	18	.282	12
Bo Diaz	15	32	0	5	2	0	0	1	.156	0
Mike Hargrove	100	338	60	110	21	4	10	56	.325	2
Toby Harrah	149	527	99	147	25	1	20	77	.279	20
Ron Hassey	75	223	20	64	14	0	4	32	.287	1
Cliff Johnson	72	240	37	65	10	0	18	61	.271	2
Duane Kuiper	140	479	46	122	9	5	0	39	.255	4
Rick Manning	144	560	67	145	12	2	3	51	.259	30
Jim Norris	124	353	50	87	15	6	3	30	.246	15
Ron Pruitt	64	166	23	47	7	0	2	21	.283	2
Dave Rosello	59	107	20	26	6	1	3	14	.243	1
Horace Speed	26	14	6	2	0	0	0	1	.143	2
Andre Thornton	143	515	89	120	31	1	26	93	.233	5
Tom Veryzer	149	449	41	99	9	3	0	34	.220	2
Team totals	161	5376	760	1388	206	29	138	707	.258	143

=== Pitching ===
Note: W = Wins; L = Losses; ERA = Earned run average; G = Games pitched; GS = Games started; SV = Saves; IP = Innings pitched; H = Hits allowed; R = Runs allowed; ER = Earned runs allowed; BB = Walks allowed; K = Strikeouts

Player	W	L	ERA	G	GS	SV	IP	H	R	ER	BB	K
Larry Andersen	0	0	7.56	8	0	0	16.2	25	14	14	4	7
Len Barker	6	6	4.92	29	19	0	137.1	146	79	75	70	93
David Clyde	3	4	5.91	9	8	0	45.2	50	33	30	13	17
Victor Cruz	3	9	4.23	61	0	10	78.2	70	41	37	34	40
Wayne Garland	4	10	5.23	18	14	0	94.2	120	70	55	34	40
Don Hood	1	0	3.68	13	0	1	22.0	13	9	9	14	7
Sid Monge	12	10	2.40	76	0	19	131.0	96	37	35	64	108
Mike Paxton	8	8	5.92	33	24	0	159.2	210	118	105	52	70
Paul Reuschel	2	1	7.94	17	1	1	45.1	73	43	40	11	22
Dan Spillner	9	5	4.62	49	13	1	157.2	153	82	81	64	97
Rick Waits	16	13	4.44	34	34	0	231.0	230	123	114	91	91
Sandy Wihtol	0	0	3.38	5	0	0	10.2	10	4	4	3	6
Eric Wilkins	2	4	4.39	16	14	0	69.2	77	41	34	38	52
Rick Wise	15	10	3.73	34	34	0	231.2	229	111	96	68	108
Team totals	81	80	4.57	161	161	32	1431.2	1502	805	727	570	781

== Awards and honors ==
- Andre Thornton, Roberto Clemente Award

All-Star Game

== Farm system ==
Level	Team	League	Manager
AAA	Tacoma Tugs	Pacific Coast League	Gene Dusan
AA	Chattanooga Lookouts	Southern League	Woody Smith
A	Waterloo Indians	Midwest League	Cal Emery
A-Short Season	Batavia Trojans	New York–Penn League	Tom Trebelhorn
