= 1978 Cleveland Indians season =

1978 Cleveland Indians
- League: American League
- Division: East
- Ballpark: Cleveland Municipal Stadium
- City: Cleveland, Ohio
- Owners: Ted Bonda, Steve O'Neill
- General managers: Phil Seghi
- Managers: Jeff Torborg
- Television: WJKW
- Radio: WWWE

The 1978 Cleveland Indians season was the 78th season for the franchise, the 64th as the Indians and the 47th season at Cleveland Stadium. They failed to improve upon their 71–90 campaign from the previous season, and missed the playoffs for the 24th consecutive season, finishing the season at 69–90.

== Offseason ==
- December 5, 1977: Bruce Compton (minors) and Norm Churchill (minors) were traded by the Indians to the Chicago Cubs for Dave Rosello.
- February 28, 1978: Tom Buskey and John Lowenstein were traded by the Indians to the Texas Rangers for Willie Horton and David Clyde.
- March 15, 1978: Rico Carty was traded by the Indians to the Toronto Blue Jays for Dennis DeBarr.
- March 30, 1978: Dennis Eckersley and Fred Kendall were traded by the Indians to the Boston Red Sox for Rick Wise, Mike Paxton, Ted Cox, and Bo Díaz.

== Regular season ==
On May 12, pitcher Nolan Ryan of the California Angels struck out Buddy Bell for the 2500th strikeout of his career.

=== Season standings ===
AL East
Team	W	L	Pct.	GB	Home	Road
New York Yankees	100	63	.613	—	55‍–‍26	45‍–‍37
Boston Red Sox	99	64	.607	1	59‍–‍23	40‍–‍41
Milwaukee Brewers	93	69	.574	6½	54‍–‍27	39‍–‍42
Baltimore Orioles	90	71	.559	9	51‍–‍30	39‍–‍41
Detroit Tigers	86	76	.531	13½	47‍–‍34	39‍–‍42
Cleveland Indians	69	90	.434	29	42‍–‍36	27‍–‍54
Toronto Blue Jays	59	102	.366	40	37‍–‍44	22‍–‍58

=== Record vs. opponents ===
1978 American League record Sources:
Team	BAL	BOS	CAL	CWS	CLE	DET	KC	MIL	MIN	NYY	OAK	SEA	TEX	TOR
Baltimore	—	7–8	4–6	8–1	9–6	7–8	2–8	7–8	5–5	6–9	11–0	9–1	7–4	8–7
Boston	8–7	—	9–2	7–3	7–8	12–3	4–6	10–5	9–2	7–9	5–5	7–3	3–7	11–4
California	6–4	2–9	—	8–7	6–4	4–7	9–6	5–5	12–3	5–5	9–6	9–6	5–10	7–3
Chicago	1–8	3–7	7–8	—	8–2	2–9	8–7	4–7	8–7	1–9	7–8	7–8	11–4	4–6
Cleveland	6–9	8–7	4–6	2–8	—	5–10	5–6	5–10	5–5	6–9	4–6	8–1	1–9	10–4
Detroit	8–7	3–12	7–4	9–2	10–5	—	4–6	7–8	4–6	4–11	6–4	8–2	7–3	9–6
Kansas City	8–2	6–4	6–9	7–8	6–5	6–4	—	6–4	7–8	6–5	10–5	12–3	7–8	5–5
Milwaukee	8–7	5–10	5–5	7–4	10–5	8–7	4–6	—	4–7	10–5	9–1	5–5	6–4	12–3
Minnesota	5–5	2–9	3–12	7–8	5–5	6–4	8–7	7–4	—	3–7	9–6	6–9	6–9	6–4
New York	9–6	9–7	5–5	9–1	9–6	11–4	5–6	5–10	7–3	—	8–2	6–5	6–4	11–4
Oakland	0–11	5–5	6–9	8–7	6–4	4–6	5–10	1–9	6–9	2–8	—	13–2	6–9	7–4
Seattle	1–9	3–7	6–9	8–7	1–8	2–8	3–12	5–5	9–6	5–6	2–13	—	3–12	8–2
Texas	4–7	7–3	10–5	4–11	9–1	3–7	8–7	4–6	9–6	4–6	9–6	12–3	—	4–7
Toronto	7–8	4–11	3–7	6–4	4–10	6–9	5–5	3–12	4–6	4–11	4–7	2–8	7–4	—

=== Notable transactions ===
- June 14, 1978: Dennis Kinney was traded by the Indians to the San Diego Padres for Dan Spillner.
- June 15, 1978: Mike Vail was traded by the Indians to the Chicago Cubs for Joe Wallis.
- June 15, 1978: Joe Wallis was traded by the Indians to the Oakland Athletics for Gary Alexander.
- June 22, 1978: Bill Laxton was traded by the Indians to the San Diego Padres for Dave Freisleben.
- June 26, 1978: Dennis DeBarr was traded by the Indians to the Chicago Cubs for Paul Reuschel.
- July 3, 1978: Willie Horton was released by the Indians.

=== Opening Day Lineup ===
Opening Day Starters
#	Name	Position
00	Paul Dade	RF
18	Duane Kuiper	2B
1	Johnny Grubb	LF
29	Andre Thornton	1B
23	Willie Horton	DH
14	Larvell Blanks	SS
25	Buddy Bell	3B
28	Rick Manning	CF
13	Ron Pruitt	C
17	Wayne Garland	P

=== Roster ===
1978 Cleveland Indians
Roster
Pitchers: 32 David Clyde; 39 Al Fitzmorris; 38 Dave Freisleben; 17 Wayne Garland; 44 Don Hood; 34 Jim Kern; 51 Dennis Kinney; 46 Rick Kreuger; 43 Sid Monge; 48 Mike Paxton; 41 Paul Reuschel; 37 Dan Spillner; 36 Rick Waits; 40 Rick Wise	Catchers: 35 Gary Alexander; 16 Bo Díaz; 9 Ron Hassey; 7,13 Ron Pruitt; Infielders: 25 Buddy Bell; 14 Larvell Blanks; 31 Wayne Cage; 8 Alfredo Griffin; 18 Duane Kuiper; 29 Andre Thornton; 21 Tom Veryzer	Outfielders: 23 Dan Briggs; 7 Bernie Carbo; 22 Ted Cox; 00 Paul Dade; 1 Johnny Grubb; 28 Rick Manning; 27 Jim Norris; 20 Horace Speed; 35 Mike Vail; Other batters: 23 Willie Horton; 30 Larry Lintz	Manager: 10 Jeff Torborg; Coaches: 6 Rocky Colavito (Hitting/First Base); 4 Dave Duncan (Bullpen); 2 Harvey Haddix (Pitching); 7 Joe Moeller (Bullpen); 24 Joe Nossek (Third Base)

== Player stats ==
=== Batting ===
Note: G = Games played; AB = At bats; R = Runs scored; H = Hits; 2B = Doubles; 3B = Triples; HR = Home runs; RBI = Runs batted in; AVG = Batting average; SB = Stolen bases

Player	G	AB	R	H	2B	3B	HR	RBI	AVG	SB
Gary Alexander	90	324	39	76	14	3	17	62	.235	0
Buddy Bell	142	556	71	157	27	8	6	62	.282	1
Larvell Blanks	70	193	19	49	10	0	2	20	.254	0
Dan Briggs	15	49	4	8	0	1	1	1	.163	0
Wayne Cage	36	98	11	24	6	1	4	13	.245	1
Bernie Carbo	60	174	21	50	8	0	4	16	.287	1
Ted Cox	82	227	14	53	7	0	1	19	.233	0
Paul Dade	93	307	37	78	12	1	3	20	.254	12
Bo Diaz	44	127	12	30	4	0	2	11	.236	0
Alfredo Griffin	5	4	1	2	1	0	0	0	.500	0
Johnny Grubb	113	378	54	100	16	6	14	61	.265	5
Ron Hassey	25	74	5	15	0	0	2	9	.203	2
Willie Horton	50	169	15	42	7	0	5	22	.249	3
Jim Kern	3	1	0	0	0	0	0	0	.000	0
Duane Kuiper	149	547	52	155	18	6	0	43	.283	4
Larry Lintz	3	0	1	0	0	0	0	0	—	0
Rick Manning	148	566	65	149	27	3	3	50	.263	12
Jim Norris	113	315	41	89	14	5	2	27	.283	12
Ron Pruitt	71	187	17	44	6	1	6	17	.235	2
Horace Speed	70	106	13	24	4	1	0	4	.226	2
Andre Thornton	145	508	97	133	22	4	33	105	.262	4
Mike Vail	14	34	2	8	2	1	0	2	.235	1
Tom Veryzer	130	421	48	114	18	4	1	32	.271	1
Team totals	159	5365	639	1400	223	45	106	596	.261	64

=== Pitching ===
Note: W = Wins; L = Losses; ERA = Earned run average; G = Games pitched; GS = Games started; SV = Saves; IP = Innings pitched; H = Hits allowed; R = Runs allowed; ER = Earned runs allowed; BB = Walks allowed; K = Strikeouts

Player	W	L	ERA	G	GS	SV	IP	H	R	ER	BB	K
David Clyde	8	11	4.28	28	25	0	153.1	166	80	73	60	83
Al Fitzmorris	0	1	6.28	7	0	0	14.1	19	10	10	7	5
Dave Freisleben	1	4	7.11	12	10	0	44.1	52	37	35	31	19
Wayne Garland	2	3	7.89	6	6	0	29.2	43	27	26	16	13
Don Hood	5	6	4.48	36	19	0	154.2	166	82	77	77	73
Jim Kern	10	10	3.08	58	0	13	99.1	77	36	34	58	95
Dennis Kinney	0	2	4.42	18	0	5	38.2	37	21	19	14	19
Rick Kreuger	0	0	3.86	6	0	0	9.1	6	4	4	3	7
Sid Monge	4	3	2.76	48	2	6	84.2	71	36	26	51	54
Mike Paxton	12	11	3.86	33	27	1	191.0	179	89	82	63	96
Paul Reuschel	2	4	3.11	18	6	0	89.2	95	33	31	22	24
Dan Spillner	3	1	3.67	36	0	3	56.1	54	26	23	21	48
Rick Waits	13	15	3.20	34	33	0	230.1	206	97	82	86	97
Rick Wise	9	19	4.34	33	31	0	211.2	226	116	102	59	106
Team totals	69	90	3.97	159	159	28	1407.1	1397	694	621	568	739

== Awards and honors ==
All-Star Game

== Farm system ==
Level	Team	League	Manager
AAA	Portland Beavers	Pacific Coast League	Gene Dusan
AA	Chattanooga Lookouts	Southern League	John Orsino and Jim Bragan
A	Waterloo Indians	Midwest League	Woody Smith
A-Short Season	Batavia Trojans	New York–Penn League	Luis Isaac
