= List of Cleveland Guardians seasons =

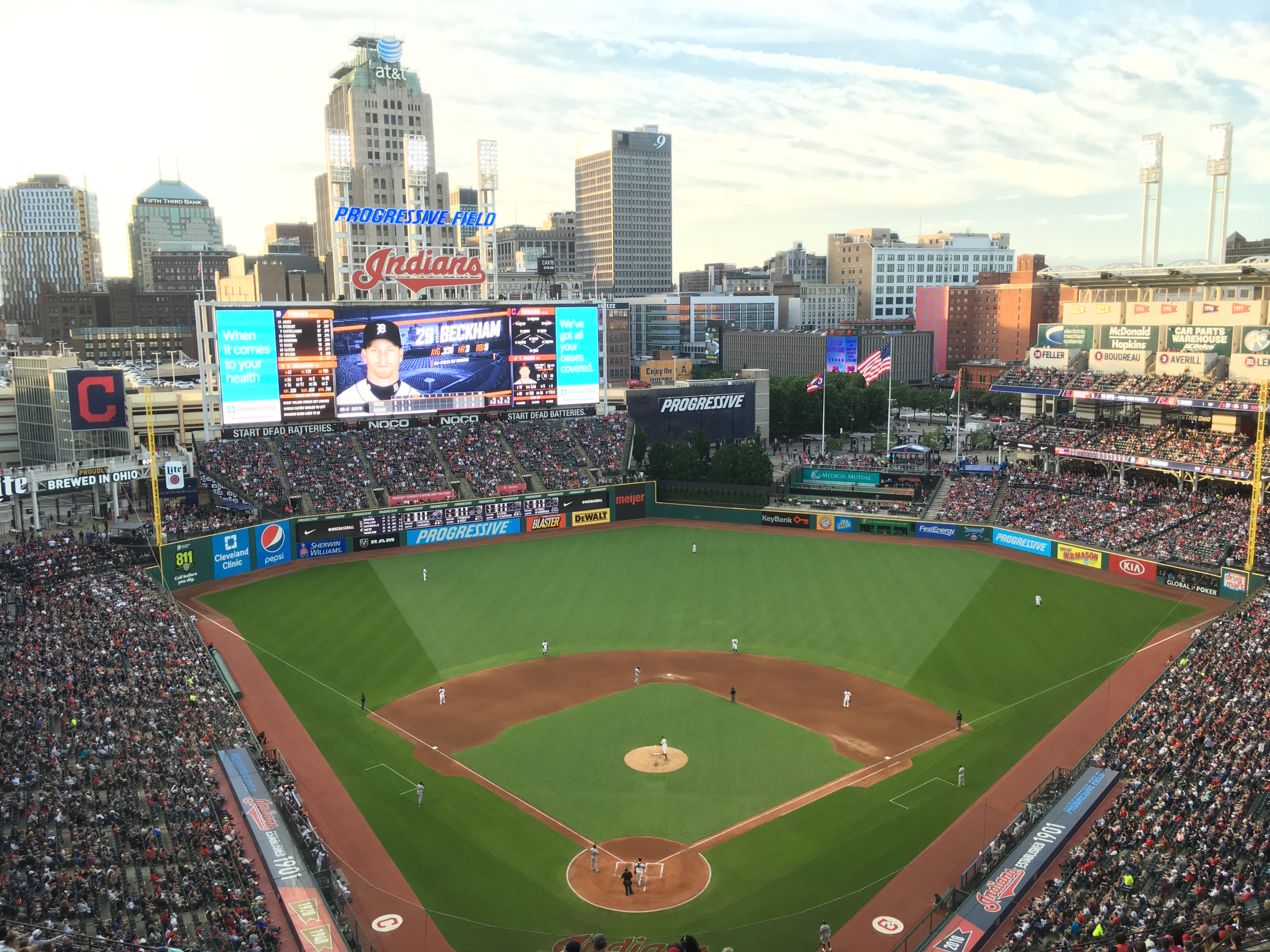
Progressive Field, home field of the Guardians since the 1994 season.

The Cleveland Guardians are a professional baseball team based in Cleveland, Ohio. They were a founding member of the American League in 1901 as the Cleveland Bluebirds or Blues. They were given the unofficial name the Cleveland Bronchos in 1902 before being renamed the Cleveland Napoleons or Naps in 1903, and then being renamed the Cleveland Indians in 1915. The team remained as the Cleveland Indians for over a century, until the team was renamed the Cleveland Guardians in 2021, after decades of controversy surrounding the "Indians" name. officially becoming the Guardians on November 19, 2021.

The team made its first World Series appearance in 1920 and won the first of their two World Series titles. Since then, the Indians have had three periods of success. The first was from 1947 to 1956, when they had winning records in every season, including a 111–43 record in 1954, which remains the best Major League Baseball regular season record since the 1909 Pirates, and won their only other World Series in 1948. In 1954, they appeared in the World Series, and lost. Cleveland's second highly successful period was from 1994 to 2001, when they had eight consecutive winning seasons, six AL Central division titles, and two World Series appearances in 1995 and 1997, but lost both of these World Series. The third extended period of success began in 2013 under manager Terry Francona, during which they had eight consecutive winning seasons from 2013 to 2020, five playoff appearances, and one World Series appearance in 2016.

Cleveland has also experienced failure in their history. From the split of the American League into two divisions in 1969 until 1993, the Indians did not make a single postseason appearance and played only four winning seasons. They posted 100 losses four times during the era.

== Key ==
ALCS	American League Championship Series
ALDS	American League Division Series
ALWC	American League Wild Card Game/Series
MVP	Most Valuable Player Award
TC	Triple Crown
MOY	Manager of the Year Award
ROY	Rookie of the Year Award
CYA	Cy Young Award
CBPOY	Comeback Player of the Year Award
WSMVP	World Series Most Valuable Player Award

== Seasons ==
World Series champions †	AL champions *	Division champions (1969–present) ^	Wild card berth (1995–present) ¤	Division runner-up (2020) ‡

Season	Team	Level	League	Division	Finish	Wins	Losses	Win%	GB	Playoffs	Awards	Manager
Cleveland Bluebirds or Blues
1901	1901	MLB	AL		7th	54	82	.397	29			Jimmy McAleer
1902	1902 (Note: unofficially known as the Cleveland Bronchos)	MLB	AL		5th	69	67	.507	14			Bill Armour
Cleveland Napoleons or Naps
1903	1903	MLB	AL		3rd	77	63	.550	15			Bill Armour
1904	1904	MLB	AL		4th	86	65	.570	7½			Bill Armour
1905	1905	MLB	AL		5th	76	78	.494	19			Nap Lajoie (56–57); Bill Bradley (20–21)
1906	1906	MLB	AL		3rd	89	64	.582	5			Nap Lajoie
1907	1907	MLB	AL		4th	85	67	.559	8			Nap Lajoie
1908	1908	MLB	AL		2nd	90	64	.584	½			Nap Lajoie
1909	1909	MLB	AL		6th	71	82	.464	27½			Nap Lajoie (57–57); Deacon McGuire (14–25)
1910	1910	MLB	AL		5th	71	81	.467	32			Deacon McGuire
1911	1911	MLB	AL		3rd	80	73	.523	22			Deacon McGuire (6–11); George Stovall (74–62)
1912	1912	MLB	AL		5th	75	78	.490	30½			Harry Davis (54–71); Joe Birmingham (21–7)
1913	1913	MLB	AL		3rd	86	66	.566	9½			Joe Birmingham
1914	1914	MLB	AL		8th	51	102	.333	48½			Joe Birmingham
Cleveland Indians
1915	1915	MLB	AL		7th	57	95	.375	44½			Joe Birmingham (12–16); Lee Fohl (45–79)
1916	1916	MLB	AL		6th	77	77	.500	14			Lee Fohl
1917	1917	MLB	AL		3rd	88	66	.571	12			Lee Fohl
1918	1918	MLB	AL		2nd	73	54	.575	2½			Lee Fohl
1919	1919	MLB	AL		2nd	84	55	.604	3½			Lee Fohl (44–34); Tris Speaker (40–21)
1920	1920	MLB †	AL *		1st	98	56	.636	—	Won World Series (Robins) 5–2 †		Tris Speaker
1921	1921	MLB	AL		2nd	94	60	.610	4½			Tris Speaker
1922	1922	MLB	AL		4th	78	76	.506	16			Tris Speaker
1923	1923	MLB	AL		3rd	82	71	.536	16½			Tris Speaker
1924	1924	MLB	AL		6th	67	86	.438	24½			Tris Speaker
1925	1925	MLB	AL		6th	70	84	.455	27½			Tris Speaker
1926	1926	MLB	AL		2nd	88	66	.571	3		George Burns (MVP)	Tris Speaker
1927	1927	MLB	AL		6th	66	87	.431	43½			Jack McCallister
1928	1928	MLB	AL		7th	62	92	.403	39			Roger Peckinpaugh
1929	1929	MLB	AL		3rd	81	71	.533	24			Roger Peckinpaugh
1930	1930	MLB	AL		4th	81	73	.526	21			Roger Peckinpaugh
1931	1931	MLB	AL		4th	78	76	.506	30			Roger Peckinpaugh
1932	1932	MLB	AL		4th	87	65	.572	19			Roger Peckinpaugh
1933	1933	MLB	AL		4th	75	76	.497	23½			Roger Peckinpaugh (26–25); Bibb Falk (0–1); Walter Johnson (48–51)
1934	1934	MLB	AL		3rd	85	69	.552	16			Walter Johnson
1935	1935	MLB	AL		3rd	82	71	.536	12			Walter Johnson (46–48); Steve O'Neill (36–23)
1936	1936	MLB	AL		5th	80	74	.519	22½			Steve O'Neill
1937	1937	MLB	AL		4th	83	71	.539	19			Steve O'Neill
1938	1938	MLB	AL		3rd	86	66	.566	13			Ossie Vitt
1939	1939	MLB	AL		3rd	87	67	.565	20½			Ossie Vitt
1940	1940	MLB	AL		2nd	89	65	.578	1		Bob Feller (TC)	Ossie Vitt
1941	1941	MLB	AL		4th	75	79	.487	26			Roger Peckinpaugh
1942	1942	MLB	AL		4th	75	79	.487	28			Lou Boudreau
1943	1943	MLB	AL		3rd	82	71	.536	15½			Lou Boudreau
1944	1944	MLB	AL		5th	72	82	.468	17			Lou Boudreau
1945	1945	MLB	AL		5th	73	72	.503	11			Lou Boudreau
1946	1946	MLB	AL		6th	68	86	.442	36			Lou Boudreau
1947	1947	MLB	AL		4th	80	74	.519	17			Lou Boudreau
1948	1948	MLB †	AL *		1st	97	58	.626	—	Won World Series (Braves) 4–2 †	Lou Boudreau (MVP)	Lou Boudreau
1949	1949	MLB	AL		3rd	89	65	.578	8			Lou Boudreau
1950	1950	MLB	AL		4th	92	62	.597	6			Lou Boudreau
1951	1951	MLB	AL		2nd	93	61	.604	5			Al López
1952	1952	MLB	AL		2nd	93	61	.604	2			Al López
1953	1953	MLB	AL		2nd	92	62	.597	8½		Al Rosen (MVP)	Al López
1954	1954	MLB	AL *		1st	111	43	.721	—	Lost World Series (Giants) 4–0 *		Al López
1955	1955	MLB	AL		2nd	93	61	.604	3		Herb Score (ROY)	Al López
1956	1956	MLB	AL		2nd	88	66	.571	9			Al López
1957	1957	MLB	AL		6th	76	77	.497	21½			Kerby Farrell
1958	1958	MLB	AL		4th	77	76	.503	14½			Bobby Bragan (31–36); Joe Gordon (46–40)
1959	1959	MLB	AL		2nd	89	65	.578	5			Joe Gordon
1960	1960	MLB	AL		4th	76	78	.494	21			Joe Gordon (49–46); Jo-Jo White (1–0); Jimmy Dykes (26–32)
1961	1961	MLB	AL		5th	78	83	.484	30½			Jimmy Dykes (77–83); Mel Harder (1–0)
1962	1962	MLB	AL		6th	80	82	.494	16			Mel McGaha (78–82); Mel Harder (2–0)
1963	1963	MLB	AL		5th	79	83	.488	25½			Birdie Tebbetts
1964	1964	MLB	AL		6th	79	83	.488	20			George Strickland (33–39); Birdie Tebbetts (46–44)
1965	1965	MLB	AL		5th	87	75	.537	15			Birdie Tebbetts
1966	1966	MLB	AL		5th	81	81	.500	17			Birdie Tebbetts (66–57); George Strickland (15–24)
1967	1967	MLB	AL		8th	75	87	.463	17			Joe Adcock
1968	1968	MLB	AL		3rd	86	75	.534	16½			Alvin Dark
1969	1969	MLB	AL	East	6th	62	99	.385	46½			Alvin Dark
1970	1970	MLB	AL	East	5th	76	86	.469	32			Alvin Dark
1971	1971	MLB	AL	East	6th	60	102	.371	43		Chris Chambliss (ROY)	Alvin Dark (42–61); Johnny Lipon (18–41)
1972	1972	MLB	AL	East	5th	72	84	.462	14		Gaylord Perry (CYA)	Ken Aspromonte
1973	1973	MLB	AL	East	6th	71	91	.438	26			Ken Aspromonte
1974	1974	MLB	AL	East	4th	77	85	.475	14			Ken Aspromonte
1975	1975	MLB	AL	East	4th	79	80	.497	15½			Frank Robinson
1976	1976	MLB	AL	East	4th	81	78	.509	16			Frank Robinson
1977	1977	MLB	AL	East	5th	71	90	.441	28½			Frank Robinson (26–31); Jeff Torborg (45–59)
1978	1978	MLB	AL	East	6th	69	90	.434	29			Jeff Torborg
1979	1979	MLB	AL	East	6th	81	80	.503	22			Jeff Torborg (43–52); Dave Garcia (38–28)
1980	1980	MLB	AL	East	6th	79	81	.494	23		Joe Charboneau (ROY)	Dave Garcia
1981	1981	MLB	AL	East	6th	26	24	.520	5			Dave Garcia
1981	1981	MLB	AL	East	5th	26	27	.491	5			Dave Garcia
1982	1982	MLB	AL	East	6th	78	84	.481	17		Andre Thornton (CBPOY)	Dave Garcia
1983	1983	MLB	AL	East	7th	70	92	.432	28			Mike Ferraro (40–60); Pat Corrales (30–32)
1984	1984	MLB	AL	East	6th	75	87	.463	29			Pat Corrales
1985	1985	MLB	AL	East	7th	60	102	.370	39½			Pat Corrales
1986	1986	MLB	AL	East	5th	84	78	.519	11½			Pat Corrales
1987	1987	MLB	AL	East	7th	61	101	.377	37			Pat Corrales (31–56); Doc Edwards (30–45)
1988	1988	MLB	AL	East	6th	78	84	.481	11			Doc Edwards
1989	1989	MLB	AL	East	6th	73	89	.451	16			Doc Edwards (65–78); John Hart (8–11)
1990	1990	MLB	AL	East	4th	77	85	.475	11		Sandy Alomar Jr. (ROY)	John McNamara
1991	1991	MLB	AL	East	7th	57	105	.352	34			John McNamara (25–52); Mike Hargrove (32–53)
1992	1992	MLB	AL	East	4th	76	86	.469	20			Mike Hargrove
1993	1993	MLB	AL	East	6th	76	86	.469	19			Mike Hargrove
1994	1994	MLB	AL	Central	2nd	66	47	.584	1	Postseason canceled		Mike Hargrove
1995	1995	MLB	AL *	Central ^	1st ^	100	44	.694	—	Won ALDS (Red Sox) 3–0; Won ALCS (Mariners) 4–2; Lost World Series (Braves) 4–2 *		Mike Hargrove
1996	1996	MLB	AL	Central ^	1st ^	99	62	.615	—	Lost ALDS (Orioles) 3–1		Mike Hargrove
1997	1997	MLB	AL *	Central ^	1st ^	86	75	.534	—	Won ALDS (Yankees) 3–2; Won ALCS (Orioles) 4–2; Lost World Series (Marlins) 4–3 *		Mike Hargrove
1998	1998	MLB	AL	Central ^	1st ^	89	73	.549	—	Won ALDS (Red Sox) 3–1; Lost ALCS (Yankees) 4–2		Mike Hargrove
1999	1999	MLB	AL	Central ^	1st ^	97	65	.599	—	Lost ALDS (Red Sox) 3–2		Mike Hargrove
2000	2000	MLB	AL	Central	2nd	90	72	.556	5			Charlie Manuel
2001	2001	MLB	AL	Central ^	1st ^	91	71	.562	—	Lost ALDS (Mariners) 3–2		Charlie Manuel
2002	2002	MLB	AL	Central	3rd	74	88	.457	20½			Charlie Manuel (39–47); Joel Skinner (35–41)
2003	2003	MLB	AL	Central	4th	68	94	.420	22			Eric Wedge
2004	2004	MLB	AL	Central	3rd	80	82	.494	12			Eric Wedge
2005	2005	MLB	AL	Central	2nd	93	69	.574	6			Eric Wedge
2006	2006	MLB	AL	Central	4th	78	84	.481	18			Eric Wedge
2007	2007	MLB	AL	Central ^	1st ^	96	66	.593	—	Won ALDS (Yankees) 3–1; Lost ALCS (Red Sox) 4–3	CC Sabathia (CYA); Eric Wedge (MOY)	Eric Wedge
2008	2008	MLB	AL	Central	3rd	81	81	.500	7½		Cliff Lee (CYA, CBPOY)	Eric Wedge
2009	2009	MLB	AL	Central	4th	65	97	.401	21½			Eric Wedge
2010	2010	MLB	AL	Central	4th	69	93	.426	25			Manny Acta
2011	2011	MLB	AL	Central	2nd	80	82	.494	15			Manny Acta
2012	2012	MLB	AL	Central	4th	68	94	.420	20			Manny Acta (65–91); Sandy Alomar Jr. (3–3)
2013	2013	MLB	AL	Central	2nd ¤	92	70	.568	1	Lost ALWC (Rays)	Terry Francona (MOY)	Terry Francona
2014	2014	MLB	AL	Central	3rd	85	77	.525	5		Corey Kluber (CYA)	Terry Francona
2015	2015	MLB	AL	Central	3rd	81	80	.503	13½			Terry Francona
2016	2016	MLB	AL *	Central ^	1st ^	94	67	.584	—	Won ALDS (Red Sox) 3–0; Won ALCS (Blue Jays) 4–1; Lost World Series (Cubs) 4–3 *	Terry Francona (MOY)	Terry Francona
2017	2017	MLB	AL	Central ^	1st ^	102	60	.630	—	Lost ALDS (Yankees) 3–2	Corey Kluber (CYA)	Terry Francona
2018	2018	MLB	AL	Central ^	1st ^	91	71	.563	—	Lost ALDS (Astros) 3–0		Terry Francona
2019	2019	MLB	AL	Central	2nd	93	69	.574	8		Carlos Carrasco (CBPOY)	Terry Francona
2020	2020	MLB	AL	Central	2nd ‡	35	25	.583	1	Lost ALWC (Yankees) 2–0	Shane Bieber (TC, CYA)	Terry Francona
2021	2021	MLB	AL	Central	2nd	80	82	.494	13			Terry Francona
Cleveland Guardians
2022	2022	MLB	AL	Central ^	1st ^	92	70	.568	—	Won ALWC (Rays) 2–0; Lost ALDS (Yankees) 3–2	Terry Francona (MOY)	Terry Francona
2023	2023	MLB	AL	Central	3rd	76	86	.469	11			Terry Francona
2024	2024	MLB	AL	Central ^	1st ^	92	69	.571	—	Won ALDS (Tigers) 3–2; Lost ALCS (Yankees) 4–1	Stephen Vogt (MOY)	Stephen Vogt
2025	2025	MLB	AL	Central ^	1st ^	88	74	.543	—	Lost ALWC (Tigers) 2–1	Stephen Vogt (MOY)	Stephen Vogt
2026	2026	MLB	AL	Central ^	1st ^	85	77	.525	—	Won ALDS (White Sox) 3–2; Lost ALCS (Rays) 4–2		Stephen Vogt
Totals						Wins	Losses	Win%				
Totals						10,025	9,520	.513	All-time regular season record			
Totals						70	72	.493	All-time postseason record			
Totals						10,095	9,592	.513	All-time regular and postseason record			

== Record by decade ==
The following table describes the Guardians' regular season win–loss record by decades.

Records are current through the 2026 season.

Decade	Wins	Losses	Win %
1900s	697	632	.524
1910s	742	747	.498
1920s	786	749	.512
1930s	824	708	.538
1940s	800	731	.523
1950s	904	634	.588
1960s	783	826	.487
1970s	737	866	.460
1980s	710	849	.455
1990s	823	728	.531
2000s	816	804	.504
2010s	855	763	.528
2020s	548	483	.532
All-time	10,025	9,520	.513

These statistics are from Baseball-Reference.com's Cleveland Guardians Team History & Encyclopedia, except where noted, and are current as of September 29, 2024.

== Postseason record by year ==
The Guardians have made the postseason 19 times in their history, with their first being in 1920 and the most recent being in 2026.

Year	Finish	Round	Opponent	Result		
1920	World Series Champions	World Series	Brooklyn Robins	Won	5	2
1948	World Series Champions	World Series	Boston Braves	Won	4	2
1954	American League Champions	World Series	New York Giants	Lost	0	4
1995	American League Champions	ALDS	Boston Red Sox	Won	3	0
1995	American League Champions	ALCS	Seattle Mariners	Won	4	2
1995	American League Champions	World Series	Atlanta Braves	Lost	2	4
1996	American League Central Champions	ALDS	Baltimore Orioles	Lost	1	3
1997	American League Champions	ALDS	New York Yankees	Won	3	2
1997	American League Champions	ALCS	Baltimore Orioles	Won	4	2
1997	American League Champions	World Series	Florida Marlins	Lost	3	4
1998	American League Central Champions	ALDS	Boston Red Sox	Won	3	1
1998	American League Central Champions	ALCS	New York Yankees	Lost	2	4
1999	American League Central Champions	ALDS	Boston Red Sox	Lost	2	3
2001	American League Central Champions	ALDS	Seattle Mariners	Lost	2	3
2007	American League Central Champions	ALDS	New York Yankees	Won	3	1
2007	American League Central Champions	ALCS	Boston Red Sox	Lost	3	4
2013	American League Wild Card	Wild Card Game	Tampa Bay Rays	Lost	0	1
2016	American League Champions	ALDS	Boston Red Sox	Won	3	0
2016	American League Champions	ALCS	Toronto Blue Jays	Won	4	1
2016	American League Champions	World Series	Chicago Cubs	Lost	3	4
2017	American League Central Champions	ALDS	New York Yankees	Lost	2	3
2018	American League Central Champions	ALDS	Houston Astros	Lost	0	3
2020	American League Central 2nd Place	Wild Card Series	New York Yankees	Lost	0	2
2022	American League Central Champions	Wild Card Series	Tampa Bay Rays	Won	2	0
2022	American League Central Champions	ALDS	New York Yankees	Lost	2	3
2024	American League Central Champions	ALDS	Detroit Tigers	Won	3	2
2024	American League Central Champions	ALCS	New York Yankees	Lost	1	4
2025	American League Central Champions	Wild Card Series	Detroit Tigers	Lost	1	2
2026	American League Central Champions	ALDS	Chicago White Sox	Won	3	2
2026	American League Central Champions	ALCS	Tampa Bay Rays	Lost	2	4
19	Totals			13–17	70	72
