= 1980 Cleveland Indians season =

1980 Cleveland Indians
- League: American League
- Division: East
- Ballpark: Cleveland Municipal Stadium
- City: Cleveland, Ohio
- Owners: Steve O'Neill
- General managers: Phil Seghi
- Managers: Dave Garcia
- Television: WUAB
- Radio: WWWE

The 1980 Cleveland Indians season was the 80th season for the franchise, the 66th as the Indians and the 49th season at Cleveland Stadium. They failed to improve upon their 81–80 campaign from the previous season, and missed the playoffs for the 26th consecutive season, finishing the season at 79–81.

== Offseason ==
- October 24, 1979: Paul Reuschel was released by the Indians.
- January 4, 1980: David Clyde and Jim Norris were traded by the Indians to the Texas Rangers for Gary Gray and Mike Bucci (minors).
- February 15, 1980: Jerry Mumphrey was traded by the Indians to the San Diego Padres for Bob Owchinko and Jim Wilhelm.

== Regular season ==
"Super Joe" Charboneau made his debut with the Indians in 1980, splitting time between left field and designated hitter. His 23 home runs led the team and he captured the city's imagination with his hard hitting and his eccentricities. His tendency to dye his hair unnatural colors, open beer bottles with his eye socket, and drink beer with a straw through his nose, and other stories that emerged about how he did his own dental work and fixed a broken nose with a pair of pliers and a few shots of Jack Daniel's whiskey, stood out in 1980. By mid-season, Charboneau was the subject of a song--"Go Joe Charboneau"—that reached #3 on the local charts.

He finished the season with 87 runs batted in and a .289 batting average while winning the American League Rookie of the Year award—all in spite of being stabbed with a ball-point pen by a crazed fan as he waited for the team bus on March 8. The pen penetrated an inch and hit a rib, but Charboneau played his first regular-season game just over a month later, on April 11. He missed the final six weeks of the season with a pelvis injury. He would never play another full season in the majors after 1980.

=== Season standings ===
AL East
Team	W	L	Pct.	GB	Home	Road
New York Yankees	103	59	.636	—	53‍–‍28	50‍–‍31
Baltimore Orioles	100	62	.617	3	50‍–‍31	50‍–‍31
Milwaukee Brewers	86	76	.531	17	40‍–‍42	46‍–‍34
Boston Red Sox	83	77	.519	19	36‍–‍45	47‍–‍32
Detroit Tigers	84	78	.519	19	43‍–‍38	41‍–‍40
Cleveland Indians	79	81	.494	23	44‍–‍35	35‍–‍46
Toronto Blue Jays	67	95	.414	36	35‍–‍46	32‍–‍49

=== Record vs. opponents ===
1980 American League record Sources:
Team	BAL	BOS	CAL	CWS	CLE	DET	KC	MIL	MIN	NYY	OAK	SEA	TEX	TOR
Baltimore	—	8–5	10–2	6–6	6–7	10–3	6–6	7–6	10–2	7–6	7–5	6–6	6–6	11–2
Boston	5–8	—	9–3	6–4	7–6	8–5	5–7	6–7	6–6	3–10	9–3	7–5	5–7	7–6
California	2–10	3–9	—	3–10	4–6	5–7	5–8	6–6	7–6	2–10	3–10	11–2	11–2	3–9
Chicago	6–6	4–6	10–3	—	5–7	2–10	5–8	5–7	5–8	5–7	6–7	6–7	6–7–2	5–7
Cleveland	7–6	6–7	6–4	7–5	—	3–10	5–7	3–10	9–3	5–8	6–6	8–4	6–6	8–5
Detroit	3–10	5–8	7–5	10–2	10–3	—	2–10	7–6	6–6	5–8	6–6	10–2–1	4–8	9–4
Kansas City	6–6	7–5	8–5	8–5	7–5	10–2	—	6–6	5–8	8–4	6–7	7–6	10–3	9–3
Milwaukee	6–7	7–6	6–6	7–5	10–3	6–7	6–6	—	7–5	5–8	7–5	9–3	5–7	5–8
Minnesota	2–10	6–6	6–7	8–5	3–9	6–6	8–5	5–7	—	4–8	6–7	7–6	9–3	7–5
New York	6–7	10–3	10–2	7–5	8–5	8–5	4–8	8–5	8–4	—	8–4	9–3	7–5	10–3
Oakland	5–7	3–9	10–3	7–6	6–6	6–6	7–6	5–7	7–6	4–8	—	8–5	7–6	8–4
Seattle	6–6	5–7	2–11	7–6	4–8	2–10–1	6–7	3–9	6–7	3–9	5–8	—	4–9	6–6
Texas	6–6	7–5	2–11	7–6–2	6–6	8–4	3–10	7–5	3–9	5–7	6–7	9–4	—	7–5
Toronto	2–11	6–7	9–3	7–5	5–8	4–9	3–9	8–5	5–7	3–10	4–8	6–6	5–7	—

=== Notable transactions ===
- June 3, 1980: 1980 Major League Baseball draft
  - Kelly Gruber was drafted by the Indians in the 1st round (10th pick). Player signed June 8, 1980.
  - Doug Drabek was drafted by the Indians in the 4th round, but did not sign.
  - Mike Jeffcoat was drafted in the 13th round of the 1980 amateur draft.

=== Opening Day Lineup ===
Opening Day Starters
#	Name	Position
28	Rick Manning	CF
11	Toby Harrah	3B
21	Mike Hargrove	1B
35	Gary Alexander	DH
6	Jorge Orta	RF
9	Ron Hassey	C
34	Joe Charboneau	LF
18	Duane Kuiper	2B
15	Tom Veryzer	SS
37	Dan Spillner	P

=== Roster ===
1980 Cleveland Indians
Roster
Pitchers: 39 Len Barker; 47 Don Collins; 23 Víctor Cruz; 40 John Denny; 17 Wayne Garland; 48 Ross Grimsley; 43 Sid Monge; 42 Bob Owchinko; 48 Mike Paxton; 37 Dan Spillner; 46 Mike Stanton; 36 Rick Waits; 56 Sandy Wihtol	Catchers: 35 Gary Alexander; 16 Bo Díaz; 9 Ron Hassey; Infielders: 7 Alan Bannister; 8 Jack Brohamer; 10 Jerry Dybzinski; 49 Gary Gray; 21 Mike Hargrove; 11 Toby Harrah; 18 Duane Kuiper; 12 Dave Rosello; 15 Tom Veryzer	Outfielders: 30,13 Dell Alston; 34 Joe Charboneau; 27 Miguel Diloné; 28 Rick Manning; 27 Andrés Mora; 6 Jorge Orta; 13 Ron Pruitt; Other batters: 44 Cliff Johnson	Manager: 1 Dave Garcia; Coaches: 4 Dave Duncan (Pitching); 14 Tommy McCraw (Hitting/First Base); 24 Joe Nossek (Third Base); 2 Dennis Sommers (Bullpen)

== Player stats ==
=== Batting ===
Note: G = Games played; AB = At bats; R = Runs scored; H = Hits; 2B = Doubles; 3B = Triples; HR = Home runs; RBI = Runs batted in; AVG = Batting average; SB = Stolen bases

Player	G	AB	R	H	2B	3B	HR	RBI	AVG	SB
Gary Alexander	76	178	22	40	7	1	5	31	.225	0
Dell Alston	52	54	11	12	1	2	0	9	.222	2
Alan Bannister	81	262	41	86	17	4	1	32	.328	9
Jack Brohamer	53	142	13	32	5	1	1	15	.225	0
Joe Charboneau	131	453	76	131	17	2	23	87	.289	2
Bo Díaz	76	207	15	47	11	2	3	32	.227	1
Miguel Dilone	132	528	82	180	30	9	0	40	.341	61
Jerry Dybzinski	114	248	32	57	11	1	1	23	.230	4
Gary Gray	28	54	4	8	1	0	2	4	.148	0
Mike Hargrove	160	589	86	179	22	2	11	85	.304	4
Toby Harrah	160	561	100	150	22	4	11	72	.267	17
Ron Hassey	130	390	43	124	18	4	8	65	.318	0
Cliff Johnson	54	174	25	40	3	1	6	28	.230	0
Duane Kuiper	42	149	10	42	5	0	0	9	.282	0
Rick Manning	140	471	55	110	17	4	3	52	.234	12
Andrés Mora	9	18	0	2	0	0	0	0	.111	0
Jorge Orta	129	481	78	140	18	3	10	64	.291	6
Ron Pruitt	23	36	1	11	1	0	0	4	.306	0
Dave Rosello	71	117	16	29	3	0	2	12	.248	0
Tom Veryzer	109	358	28	97	12	0	2	28	.271	0
Team totals	160	5470	738	1517	221	40	89	692	.277	118

=== Pitching ===
Note: W = Wins; L = Losses; ERA = Earned run average; G = Games pitched; GS = Games started; SV = Saves; IP = Innings pitched; H = Hits allowed; R = Runs allowed; ER = Earned runs allowed; BB = Walks allowed; K = Strikeouts

Player	W	L	ERA	G	GS	SV	IP	H	R	ER	BB	K
Len Barker	19	12	4.17	36	36	0	246.1	237	127	114	92	187
Don Collins	0	0	7.50	4	0	0	6.0	9	5	5	7	0
Victor Cruz	6	7	3.45	55	0	12	86.0	71	36	33	27	88
John Denny	8	6	4.39	16	16	0	108.2	116	54	53	47	59
Wayne Garland	6	9	4.61	25	20	0	150.1	163	85	77	48	55
Ross Grimsley	4	5	6.75	14	11	0	74.2	103	63	56	24	18
Sid Monge	3	5	3.53	67	0	14	94.1	80	39	37	40	61
Bob Owchinko	2	9	5.27	29	14	0	114.1	138	71	67	47	66
Mike Paxton	0	0	12.91	4	0	0	7.2	13	11	11	6	6
Dan Spillner	16	11	5.28	34	30	0	194.1	225	122	114	74	100
Mike Stanton	1	3	5.46	51	0	5	85.2	98	58	52	44	74
Rick Waits	13	14	4.45	33	33	0	224.1	231	118	111	82	109
Sandy Wihtol	1	0	3.57	17	0	1	35.1	35	18	14	14	20
Team totals	79	81	4.68	160	160	32	1428.0	1519	807	743	552	843

== Awards and honors ==
- Joe Charboneau, American League Rookie of the Year

All-Star Game

== Farm system ==
Level	Team	League	Manager
AAA	Tacoma Tigers	Pacific Coast League	Gene Dusan
AA	Chattanooga Lookouts	Southern League	Woody Smith
A	Waterloo Indians	Midwest League	Cal Emery
A-Short Season	Batavia Trojans	New York–Penn League	Rick Colzie

LEAGUE CHAMPIONS: Waterloo
