= 1977 Cleveland Indians season =

1977 Cleveland Indians
- League: American League
- Division: East
- Ballpark: Cleveland Municipal Stadium
- City: Cleveland, Ohio
- Owners: Ted Bonda
- General managers: Phil Seghi
- Managers: Frank Robinson, Jeff Torborg
- Television: WJW-TV
- Radio: WWWE

The 1977 Cleveland Indians season was the 77th season for the franchise, the 63rd as the Indians and the 46th season at Cleveland Stadium. They failed to improve upon their 81–78 campaign from the previous season, and missed the playoffs for the 23rd consecutive season, finishing the season at 71–90.

== Offseason ==
- November 5, 1976: Joe Lis was drafted from the Indians by the Seattle Mariners in the 1976 Major League Baseball expansion draft.
- December 6, 1976: Rick Cerone and John Lowenstein were traded by the Indians to the Toronto Blue Jays for Rico Carty.
- December 10, 1976: Jackie Brown was traded by the Indians to the Montreal Expos for Andre Thornton.
- March 30, 1977: Boog Powell was released by the Indians.

== Regular season ==
On May 30, Indians pitcher Dennis Eckersley threw a no-hitter against the California Angels.

=== Season standings ===
AL East
Team	W	L	Pct.	GB	Home	Road
New York Yankees	100	62	.617	—	55‍–‍26	45‍–‍36
Baltimore Orioles	97	64	.602	2½	54‍–‍27	43‍–‍37
Boston Red Sox	97	64	.602	2½	51‍–‍29	46‍–‍35
Detroit Tigers	74	88	.457	26	39‍–‍42	35‍–‍46
Cleveland Indians	71	90	.441	28½	37‍–‍44	34‍–‍46
Milwaukee Brewers	67	95	.414	33	37‍–‍44	30‍–‍51
Toronto Blue Jays	54	107	.335	45½	25‍–‍55	29‍–‍52

=== Record vs. opponents ===
1977 American League record Sources:
Team	BAL	BOS	CAL	CWS	CLE	DET	KC	MIL	MIN	NYY	OAK	SEA	TEX	TOR
Baltimore	—	6–8	5–6	5–5	11–4	12–3	4–7	11–4	6–4	8–7	8–2	7–3	4–6	10–5
Boston	8–6	—	7–3	3–7	8–7	9–6	5–5	9–6	4–6	8–7	8–3	10–1	6–4	12–3
California	6–5	3–7	—	8–7	6–4	4–6	6–9	5–5	7–8	4–7	5–10	9–6	5–10	6–4
Chicago	5–5	7–3	7–8	—	6–4	4–6	8–7	6–5	10–5	3–7	10–5	10–5	6–9	8–3
Cleveland	4–11	7–8	4–6	4–6	—	8–7	3–7	11–4	2–9	3–12	7–3	7–3	2–9	9–5
Detroit	3–12	6–9	6–4	6–4	7–8	—	3–8	10–5	5–5	6–9	5–5	5–6	2–8	10–5
Kansas City	7–4	5–5	9–6	7–8	7–3	8–3	—	8–2	10–5	5–5	9–6	11–4	8–7	8–2
Milwaukee	4–11	6–9	5–5	5–6	4–11	5–10	2–8	—	3–8	8–7	5–5	7–3	5–5	8–7
Minnesota	4–6	6–4	8–7	5–10	9–2	5–5	5–10	8–3	—	2–8	8–6	7–8	8–7	9–1
New York	7–8	7–8	7–4	7–3	12–3	9–6	5–5	7–8	8–2	—	9–2	6–4	7–3	9–6
Oakland	2–8	3–8	10–5	5–10	3–7	5–5	6–9	5–5	6–8	2–9	—	7–8	2–13	7–3
Seattle	3–7	1–10	6–9	5–10	3–7	6–5	4–11	3–7	8–7	4–6	8–7	—	9–6	4–6
Texas	6–4	4–6	10–5	9–6	9–2	8–2	7–8	5–5	7–8	3–7	13–2	6–9	—	7–4
Toronto	5–10	3–12	4–6	3–8	5–9	5–10	2–8	7–8	1–9	6–9	3–7	6–4	4–7	—

=== Transactions ===
- June 7, 1977: Jerry Dybzinski was drafted by the Cleveland Indians in the 15th round of the 1977 amateur draft.
- September 9, 1977: Ray Fosse was traded by the Indians to the Seattle Mariners for Bill Laxton and cash.

=== Opening Day Lineup ===
Opening Day Starters
#	Name	Position
28	Rick Manning	CF
18	Duane Kuiper	2B
27	Jim Norris	RF
9	Rico Carty	DH
29	Andre Thornton	1B
11	Bill Melton	3B
25	Buddy Bell	LF
10	Ray Fosse	C
15	Frank Duffy	SS
37	Dennis Eckersley	P

=== Roster ===
1977 Cleveland Indians
Roster
Pitchers: 42 Larry Andersen; 22 Jim Bibby; 35 Tom Buskey; 49 Cardell Camper; 41 Pat Dobson; 37 Dennis Eckersley; 39 Al Fitzmorris; 23,17 Wayne Garland; 44 Don Hood; 34 Jim Kern; 17 Dave LaRoche; 38 Bill Laxton; 43 Sid Monge; 36 Rick Waits	Catchers: 10 Ray Fosse; 16 Fred Kendall; Infielders: 25 Buddy Bell; 14 Larvell Blanks; 9 Rico Carty; 15 Frank Duffy; 8 Alfredo Griffin; 18 Duane Kuiper; 11 Bill Melton; 26 Dave Oliver; 29 Andre Thornton	Outfielders: 23 Bruce Bochte; 00 Paul Dade; 1 Johnny Grubb; 30 John Lowenstein; 28 Rick Manning; 27 Jim Norris; 13 Ron Pruitt; 24 Charlie Spikes	Manager: 20 Frank Robinson; 7 Jeff Torborg; Coaches: 6 Rocky Colavito (Hitting/First Base); 2 Harvey Haddix (Pitching); 4 Joe Nossek (Third Base); 7 Jeff Torborg (Bullpen)

== Player stats ==
=== Batting ===
Note: G = Games played; AB = At bats; R = Runs scored; H = Hits; 2B = Doubles; 3B = Triples; HR = Home runs; RBI = Runs batted in; AVG = Batting average; SB = Stolen bases

Player	G	AB	R	H	2B	3B	HR	RBI	AVG	SB
Buddy Bell	129	479	64	140	23	4	11	64	.292	1
Larvell Blanks	105	322	43	92	10	4	6	38	.286	3
Bruce Bochte	112	392	52	119	19	1	5	43	.304	3
Rico Carty	127	461	50	129	23	1	15	80	.280	1
Paul Dade	134	461	65	134	15	3	3	45	.291	16
Frank Duffy	122	334	30	67	13	2	4	31	.201	8
Ray Fosse	78	238	25	63	7	1	6	27	.265	0
Alfredo Griffin	14	41	5	6	1	0	0	3	.146	2
Johnny Grubb	34	93	8	28	3	3	2	14	.301	0
Fred Kendall	103	317	18	79	13	1	3	39	.249	0
Duane Kuiper	148	610	62	169	15	8	1	50	.277	11
John Lowenstein	81	149	24	36	6	1	4	12	.242	1
Rick Manning	68	252	33	57	7	3	5	18	.226	9
Bill Melton	50	133	17	32	11	0	0	14	.241	1
Jim Norris	133	440	59	119	23	6	2	37	.270	26
Dave Oliver	7	22	2	7	0	1	0	3	.318	0
Ron Pruitt	78	219	29	63	10	2	2	32	.288	2
Charlie Spikes	32	95	13	22	2	0	3	11	.232	0
Andre Thornton	131	433	77	114	20	5	28	70	.263	3
Team totals	161	5491	676	1476	221	46	100	631	.269	87

=== Pitching ===
Note: W = Wins; L = Losses; ERA = Earned run average; G = Games pitched; GS = Games started; SV = Saves; IP = Innings pitched; H = Hits allowed; R = Runs allowed; ER = Earned runs allowed; BB = Walks allowed; K = Strikeouts

Player	W	L	ERA	G	GS	SV	IP	H	R	ER	BB	K
Larry Andersen	0	1	3.14	11	0	0	14.1	10	7	5	9	8
Jim Bibby	12	13	3.57	37	30	2	206.2	197	100	82	73	141
Tom Buskey	0	0	5.29	21	0	0	34.0	45	24	20	8	15
Cardell Camper	1	0	3.86	3	1	0	9.1	7	4	4	4	9
Pat Dobson	3	12	6.14	33	17	1	133.1	155	94	91	65	81
Dennis Eckersley	14	13	3.53	33	33	0	247.1	214	100	97	54	191
Al Fitzmorris	6	10	5.41	29	21	0	133.0	164	87	80	53	54
Wayne Garland	13	19	3.60	38	38	0	282.2	281	130	113	88	118
Don Hood	2	1	3.00	41	5	0	105.0	87	42	35	49	62
Jim Kern	8	10	3.42	60	0	18	92.0	85	39	35	47	91
Dave LaRoche	2	2	5.30	13	0	4	18.2	15	13	11	7	18
Bill Laxton	0	0	5.40	2	0	0	1.2	2	1	1	2	1
Sid Monge	1	2	6.23	33	0	3	39.0	47	31	27	27	25
Rick Waits	9	7	3.99	37	16	2	135.1	132	67	60	64	62
Team totals	71	90	4.10	161	161	30	1452.1	1441	739	661	550	876

== Awards and honors ==
All-Star Game

== Farm system ==
Level	Team	League	Manager
AAA	Toledo Mud Hens	International League	Jack Cassini
AA	Jersey City Indians	Eastern League	John Orsino
A	Waterloo Indians	Midwest League	Woody Smith
A-Short Season	Batavia Trojans	New York–Penn League	Gene Dusan
