= 1976 Cleveland Indians season =

1976 Cleveland Indians
- League: American League
- Division: East
- Ballpark: Cleveland Municipal Stadium
- City: Cleveland, Ohio
- Owners: Nick Mileti
- General managers: Phil Seghi
- Managers: Frank Robinson
- Television: WJW-TV
- Radio: WWWE

The Cleveland Indians finished their 1976 season with an 81–78 win–loss record. The team scored 615 runs and allowed 615 runs for a run differential of zero.

== Offseason ==
- November 22, 1975: Oscar Gamble was traded by the Indians to the New York Yankees for Pat Dobson.
- December 9, 1975: John Ellis was traded by the Indians to the Texas Rangers for Stan Thomas and Ron Pruitt.
- December 9, 1975: Ray Fosse was purchased by the Indians from the Oakland Athletics.
- December 12, 1975: Jack Brohamer was traded by the Indians to the Chicago White Sox for Larvell Blanks.

== Regular season ==
=== Season standings ===
AL East
Team	W	L	Pct.	GB	Home	Road
New York Yankees	97	62	.610	—	45‍–‍35	52‍–‍27
Baltimore Orioles	88	74	.543	10½	42‍–‍39	46‍–‍35
Boston Red Sox	83	79	.512	15½	46‍–‍35	37‍–‍44
Cleveland Indians	81	78	.509	16	44‍–‍35	37‍–‍43
Detroit Tigers	74	87	.460	24	36‍–‍44	38‍–‍43
Milwaukee Brewers	66	95	.410	32	36‍–‍45	30‍–‍50

=== Record vs. opponents ===
1976 American League record Sources:
Team	BAL	BOS	CAL	CWS	CLE	DET	KC	MIL	MIN	NYY	OAK	TEX
Baltimore	—	7–11	8–4	8–4	7–11	12–6	6–6	11–7	4–8	13–5	4–8	8–4
Boston	11–7	—	7–5	6–6	9–9	14–4	3–9	12–6	7–5	7–11	4–8	3–9
California	4–8	5–7	—	11–7	7–5	6–6	8–10	4–8	8–10	5–7	6–12	12–6
Chicago	4–8	6–6	7–11	—	3–9	6–6	8–10	7–5	7–11	1–11	8–9	7–11
Cleveland	11–7	9–9	5–7	9–3	—	6–12	6–6	11–6	9–3	4–12	4–8	7–5
Detroit	6–12	4–14	6–6	6–6	12–6	—	4–8	12–6	4–8	9–8	6–6	5–7
Kansas City	6–6	9–3	10–8	10–8	6–6	8–4	—	8–4	10–8	7–5	9–9	7–11
Milwaukee	7–11	6–12	8–4	5–7	6–11	6–12	4–8	—	4–8	5–13	5–7	10–2
Minnesota	8–4	5–7	10–8	11–7	3–9	8–4	8–10	8–4	—	2–10	11–7	11–7
New York	5–13	11–7	7–5	11–1	12–4	8–9	5–7	13–5	10–2	—	6–6	9–3
Oakland	8–4	8–4	12–6	9–8	8–4	6–6	9–9	7–5	7–11	6–6	—	7–11
Texas	4–8	9–3	6–12	11–7	5–7	7–5	11–7	2–10	7–11	3–9	11–7	—

=== Notable transactions ===
- May 28, 1976: Fritz Peterson was traded by the Indians to the Texas Rangers for Stan Perzanowski and cash.
- June 8, 1976: 1976 Major League Baseball draft
  - Joe Beckwith was drafted by the Indians in the 12th round, but did not sign.
  - Ron Hassey was drafted by the Indians in the 18th round.
- October 1, 1976: Ramón Romero was signed as an amateur free agent by the Indians.

=== Opening Day Lineup ===
Opening Day Starters
#	Name	Position
28	Rick Manning	CF
18	Duane Kuiper	2B
25	Buddy Bell	3B
26	Boog Powell	1B
21	George Hendrick	RF
9	Rico Carty	DH
24	Charlie Spikes	LF
8	Alan Ashby	C
15	Frank Duffy	SS
37	Dennis Eckersley	P

=== Roster ===
1976 Cleveland Indians
Roster
Pitchers: 22 Jim Bibby; 31 Jackie Brown; 35 Tom Buskey; 41 Pat Dobson; 37 Dennis Eckersley; 32 Don Hood; 34 Jim Kern; 17 Dave LaRoche; 40 Harry Parker; 16 Fritz Peterson; 33 Eric Raich; 23 Stan Thomas; 36 Rick Waits	Catchers: 8 Alan Ashby; 4 Rick Cerone; 10 Ray Fosse; Infielders: 25 Buddy Bell; 14 Larvell Blanks; 9 Rico Carty; 12 Ed Crosby; 15 Frank Duffy; 12 Orlando González; 16 Alfredo Griffin; 27 Doug Howard; 18 Duane Kuiper; 30 Joe Lis; 26 Boog Powell; 20 Frank Robinson	Outfielders: 21 George Hendrick; 29 John Lowenstein; 28 Rick Manning; 13 Ron Pruitt; 11 Tommy Smith; 24 Charlie Spikes	Manager: 20 Frank Robinson; Coaches: 6 Rocky Colavito (Hitting/First Base); 1 Dave Garcia (Third Base); 2 Harvey Haddix (Pitching); 7 Jeff Torborg (Bullpen)

== Player stats ==
Note: G = Games played; AB = At bats; R = Runs scored; H = Hits; 2B = Doubles; 3B = Triples; HR = Home runs; RBI = Runs batted in; AVG = Batting average; SB = Stolen bases

=== Batting ===
Player	G	AB	R	H	2B	3B	HR	RBI	AVG	SB
Alan Ashby	89	247	26	59	5	1	4	32	.239	0
Buddy Bell	159	604	75	170	26	2	7	60	.281	3
Larvell Blanks	104	328	45	92	8	7	5	41	.280	1
Rico Carty	152	552	67	171	34	0	13	83	.310	1
Rick Cerone	7	16	1	2	0	0	0	1	.125	0
Ed Crosby	2	2	0	1	0	0	0	0	.500	0
Frank Duffy	133	392	38	83	11	2	2	30	.212	10
Ray Fosse	90	276	26	83	9	1	2	30	.301	1
Orlando Gonzalez	28	68	5	17	2	0	0	4	.250	1
Alfredo Griffin	12	4	0	1	0	0	0	0	.250	0
George Hendrick	149	551	72	146	20	3	25	81	.265	4
Doug Howard	39	90	7	19	4	0	0	13	.211	1
Duane Kuiper	135	506	47	133	13	6	0	37	.263	10
Joe Lis	20	51	4	16	1	0	2	7	.314	0
John Lowenstein	93	229	33	47	8	2	2	14	.205	11
Rick Manning	138	552	73	161	24	7	6	43	.292	16
Boog Powell	95	293	29	63	9	0	9	33	.215	1
Ron Pruitt	47	86	7	23	1	1	0	5	.267	2
Frank Robinson	36	67	5	15	0	0	3	10	.224	0
Tommy Smith	55	164	17	42	3	1	2	12	.256	8
Charlie Spikes	101	334	34	79	11	5	3	31	.237	5
Team totals	159	5412	615	1423	189	38	85	567	.263	75

=== Pitching ===
Note: W = Wins; L = Losses; ERA = Earned run average; G = Games pitched; GS = Games started; SV = Saves; IP = Innings pitched; H = Hits allowed; R = Runs allowed; ER = Earned runs allowed; BB = Walks allowed; K = Strikeouts

Player	W	L	ERA	G	GS	SV	IP	H	R	ER	BB	K
Jim Bibby	13	7	3.20	34	21	1	163.1	162	61	58	56	84
Jackie Brown	9	11	4.25	32	27	0	180.0	193	94	85	55	104
Tom Buskey	5	4	3.63	39	0	1	94.1	88	42	38	34	32
Pat Dobson	16	12	3.48	35	35	0	217.1	226	98	84	65	117
Dennis Eckersley	13	12	3.43	36	30	1	199.1	155	82	76	78	200
Don Hood	3	5	4.87	33	6	1	77.2	89	46	42	41	32
Jim Kern	10	7	2.37	50	2	15	117.2	91	38	31	50	111
Dave LaRoche	1	4	2.24	61	0	21	96.1	57	25	24	49	104
Harry Parker	0	0	0.00	3	0	0	7.0	3	0	0	0	5
Fritz Peterson	0	3	5.55	9	9	0	47.0	59	31	29	10	19
Eric Raich	0	0	16.88	1	0	0	2.2	7	5	5	0	1
Stan Thomas	4	4	2.30	37	7	6	105.2	88	33	27	41	54
Rick Waits	7	9	4.00	26	22	0	123.2	143	60	55	54	65
Team totals	81	78	3.47	159	159	46	1432.0	1361	615	552	533	928

== Awards and honors ==
All-Star Game

== Farm system ==
Level	Team	League	Manager
AAA	Toledo Mud Hens	International League	Joe Sparks
AA	Williamsport Tomahawks	Eastern League	Red Davis
A	San Jose Bees	California League	Gomer Hodge
Rookie	GCL Indians	Gulf Coast League	Jack Cassini
