= Bo Díaz =

Venezuelan baseball player (1953–1990)

- Catcher
- Born: March 23, 1953; Cúa, Miranda, Venezuela
- Died: November 23, 1990 (aged 37); Caracas, Venezuela
- Batted: Right Threw: Right

MLB debut
- September 6, 1977, for the Boston Red Sox

Last MLB appearance
- July 9, 1989, for the Cincinnati Reds

MLB statistics
- Batting average: .255
- Home runs: 87
- Runs batted in: 452
- Stats at Baseball Reference

Teams
- Boston Red Sox (1977); Cleveland Indians (1978–1981); Philadelphia Phillies (1982–1985); Cincinnati Reds (1985–1989)

Career highlights and awards
- 2× All-Star (1981, 1987)

Member of the Venezuelan

Baseball Hall of Fame
- Induction: 2006

Baudilio José Díaz Seijas (March 23, 1953 – November 23, 1990) was a Venezuelan professional baseball player. He played in Major League Baseball as a catcher from 1977 to 1989, most prominently with the Cleveland Indians where he rose to prominence as an American League (AL) All-Star player in 1981 and, later with the Philadelphia Phillies where he was a member of the 1983 National League pennant winning team. He earned his second All-Star game berth with the Cincinnati Reds in 1987. Diaz began his career with the Boston Red Sox. He was the first Venezuelan to play regularly as a catcher in Major League Baseball. In 2006, Díaz was posthumously inducted into the Venezuelan Baseball Hall of Fame.

== Baseball career ==
=== Minor Leagues and Boston Red Sox ===
Díaz was born in Cúa, Miranda, Venezuela. At the age of 14, he played on a national champion Little League team that missed a trip to the 1967 Little League World Series, when a strong earthquake devastated the city of Caracas.

In December 1970, Díaz was signed by Boston Red Sox as an amateur free agent. He spent seven seasons playing in the Red Sox minor league system. While playing for the Pawtucket Red Sox in 1977, he posted a .263 batting average, with 14 doubles, 7 home runs, and 54 runs batted in (RBI). This earned Díaz his big league call-up on September 6, 1977, versus the Blue Jays, at Toronto. He entered the game as a late-inning defensive replacement for Hall of Famer Carlton Fisk. Díaz appeared in only two games for the Red Sox, being struck out by Dennis Martínez in his only at-bat, which occurred that September 17.

=== Cleveland Indians ===
On March 30, 1978, Díaz was traded along with Ted Cox, Mike Paxton and Rick Wise to the Cleveland Indians for Dennis Eckersley and Fred Kendall. He played as the Indians' backup catcher, working behind Gary Alexander in 1978. He lost his job to Ron Hassey the following season, and played most of the year in the minor leagues with the Tacoma Tugs in the Pacific Coast League, before returning to play for the Indians in September 1979. In 1980, he hit for a .227 average in 76 games but, provided solid defense, committing only 4 errors in 356 total chances, while serving as backup catcher behind Hassey.

After Hassey was injured early in the strike-shortened 1981 season, Cleveland manager Dave Garcia began using Díaz in a platoon role alongside the left-hand hitting Hassey. By June, he was hitting for a .356 batting average with 4 home runs and 25 runs batted in to earn a place as a reserve player for the American League team in the 1981 All-Star Game. He ended the season with a .313 batting average in 63 games.

=== Philadelphia Phillies ===
In November 1981, Díaz was traded to the Philadelphia Phillies as part of a three-team trade. He became the Phillies starting catcher in 1982, replacing Bob Boone, who had been traded to the California Angels. Díaz set career highs in batting average (.288), home runs (18), and runs batted in (85). Although Díaz led National League catchers in stolen bases allowed, his pitch-calling skills helped pitcher Steve Carlton become the league's only twenty-game winner of the season. Carlton also led the league in strikeouts and shutouts and, was named the 1982 National League Cy Young Award winner. In a 1982 computer ranking of major league players that used offensive and defensive statistics, Díaz was ranked second among National League catchers behind only Gary Carter.

Díaz was a member of the 1983 Phillies team that became known as The Wheeze Kids, due to the average age of the team being over thirty. The moniker was a whimsical reference to the Whiz Kids Phillies team that won the National League pennant in 1950. In a game against the New York Mets on April 13, 1983, the Phillies were trailing by a score of 9–6 in the ninth inning, when Díaz hit a two-out, walk-off grand slam home run, a feat sometimes called an ultimate grand slam, off Neil Allen to win the game by a score of 10–9. On September 23, Díaz was the Phillies catcher when Steve Carlton won the 300th game of his career. With the Phillies leading the game by a score of 3–2 in the fifth inning, Díaz sealed the victory with a two-run single.

The Phillies won 12 out of the final 14 games of the 1983 season to win the National League Eastern Division title. Díaz contributed by hitting .360 in the final week of the season, including a game on September 28 against the Chicago Cubs in which he had 5 hits in 5 at-bats including 2 home runs. Although he led National League catchers in errors, he led the league in range factor and finished second in putouts, assists and in baserunners caught stealing. After defeating the Los Angeles Dodgers in the 1983 National League Championship Series, the Phillies lost the 1983 World Series against the Baltimore Orioles in five games. In the only World Series appearance of his career, Díaz was the leading hitter for the Phillies with a .333 batting average. During Game One of the Series (the only game of the Series that the Phillies won, by a 2–1 score), Díaz almost hit a home-run, but he was robbed of it by John Lowenstein with a spectacular, beyond the wall catch.

In 1984, Díaz went on the disabled list twice due to knee problems and played in only 27 games. After the season ended, he underwent two knee surgeries to restore his mobility. Díaz broke his right wrist at the beginning of the 1985 season and was on the disabled list for a month and a half. During his absence, his replacement, Ozzie Virgil hit above the .300 mark, relegating Díaz to the backup catcher's role upon his return. On August 8, 1985, the Phillies traded Díaz to the Cincinnati Reds.

=== Cincinnati Reds ===
Díaz immediately became the Reds' starting catcher. He had been hitting for a .211 average at the time of the trade but, hit .261 in 51 games for the Reds, ending the 1985 season with a .245 average overall along with 5 home runs and 31 runs batted in. Díaz remained healthy in 1986, appearing in 134 games and posted a .272 average with 10 home runs and 56 runs batted in. Although he committed 13 errors, he finished fourth among catchers in assists with 80 and, fourth in baserunners caught stealing with 55.

On June 27, 1986, Díaz was part of an unusual occurrence when San Francisco Giants second baseman, Robby Thompson, became the first player in major league history to be caught stealing four times in one game. Thompson was thrown out at second base by Díaz in the 4th, 6th and 9th innings and was picked off by pitcher John Franco in the 11th inning. Three of the outs occurred during attempted hit and run plays and were recorded as stolen base attempts.

In 1987, Díaz was hitting for a .292 average at mid-season, earning his second All-Star selection as a reserve player, this time for the National League team in the 1987 All-Star Game. He was named Player of the Month for the month of July during which he produced a .351 batting average with 5 home runs and 23 runs batted in, including a game on July 7 when he had 6 runs batted in. His heavy workload continued as he played in 140 games, ending the season with a respectable .270 average with 15 home runs and 82 runs batted in. Díaz also led National League catchers in baserunners caught stealing and finished third in fielding percentage, committing only 7 errors in 137 games played as a catcher.

Reds' manager Pete Rose continued to play Díaz almost every day in the 1988 season. Díaz was the Reds catcher on June 6, 1988, when pitcher Tom Browning almost threw a no-hitter against the San Diego Padres. Browning held the Padres hitless through eight innings before Tony Gwynn hit a single with one out in the ninth inning (however, Browning would go on to throw a perfect game two months later on September 16 against the Dodgers). Eventually, the heavy workload began to catch up with Díaz. In mid-June, a shoulder injury put him on the disabled list and then in September, Díaz had to undergo arthroscopic surgery on his left knee, which ended his season. He shared catching duties with Jeff Reed in 1989 but, in July Díaz had to undergo arthroscopic surgery on his left knee for a second time, which ended his season. Díaz decided to retire, having played in his final major league game on July 9, 1989, at the age of 36.

== Career statistics ==
In a 13-year major league career, Díaz played in 993 games, accumulating 834 hits in 3,274 at bats for a .255 career batting average along with 87 home runs, 452 runs batted in and a .297 on-base percentage. A two-time All-Star, he finished his career with a .986 fielding percentage.

== Leones del Caracas ==
Díaz played exclusively for the Leones del Caracas team in the Venezuelan Winter League (1972–1990), forming a fiery offensive combo along with slugger Tony Armas. During his time in the league, Díaz batted .281, with 265 runs scored, 290 runs batted in, 79 doubles, 7 triples, and 57 home runs, in 537 games played. In 1979, he set a Venezuelan League single-season record for home runs with 20, a record that was broken by Alex Cabrera, who hit 21 in 2013–2014 season. Díaz was the leading hitter in the 1982 Caribbean Series with a .412 batting average and 2 home runs, earning him the Series’ Most Valuable Player award.

Díaz was part of an extremely unlikely event spanning thirteen years. On January 6, 1973, he caught for minor league pitcher Urbano Lugo, who threw a no-hitter as the Leones del Caracas defeated the Tiburones de La Guaira, 6–0. Thirteen years later, on January 24, 1986, Díaz was the catcher for another no-hitter in a 4–0 Caracas's victory over La Guaira. This time, the pitcher was major leaguer Urbano Lugo Jr., son of the elder Lugo.

== Death ==
On November 23, 1990, Díaz was killed, aged 37, when a satellite dish he was trying to install on the roof of his La Tahona Residential Area Caracas home fell on him and crushed his neck and head. Díaz was survived by his wife, Maria, and their two sons.

== See also ==
- Players from Venezuela in Major League Baseball
- List of Major League Baseball ultimate grand slams
- List of unusual deaths in the 20th century

Awards and achievements
Preceded by Tony Gwynn	National League Player of the Month; July, 1987	Succeeded by Andre Dawson
