= The Jones Sisters Trio =

- Also known as: Jones Sisters
- Origin: Cleveland, Ohio, United States
- Genres: gospel
- Years active: 1955-1975
- Labels: World Records
- Members: Cheryl Jones; Gail Jones; Phyllis Jones

The Jones Sisters Trio were an American gospel recording act from Cleveland, Ohio that recorded five albums during the 1960s and 1970s. The group had consisted of sisters Cheryl (b. August 10, 1945), Gail (b. June 10, 1947), and Phyllis (b. July 4, 1949).

== Early years ==
As children in Cleveland, the Jones sisters began singing gospel music in front of their church in the early 1950s, encouraged by their parents Howard and Wanda Jones. They quickly began singing on local television programs and at other churches; during this time they officially names themselves "The Jones Sisters Trio. After the family moved to Liberia, in 1960 The Jones Sisters Trio began singing for the Billy Graham crusade in Monrovia, which they did over the next few years, "to an enthusiastic response." Before leaving Africa to return home to Cleveland, Graham officially dedicated the Jones's home to the work God had called them to in Liberia; the 300 guests at the ceremony, included Liberian President William V.S. Tubman and Vice President William Tolbert.

== Career ==
In 1966, having already recorded two albums for World Records, the Trio (now 21, 19, and 17) played as part of the week-long Harlem Crusade Association rally at the Apollo Theater to over 12,000 people. They went on to record three more albums in the 1960s and 1970s.

Cheryl's marriage in the early 1970s, according to mother Wanda, "curtailed the ministry of the Jones Sisters Trio." They still occasionally sang together, but their activity curtailed dramatically after this time, as well as any formal recording.

== Subsequent years ==
In recent years the sisters have maintained a lower public profile but have continued to perform.

Gail released one solo album. In 1979, she married Cleveland Indians star Andre Thornton. They have two children together (Jonathan and Dean) and raised Andre Jr. from Andre's first marriage. Gail introduced Phyllis to Thornton's friend and fellow ballplayer Pat Kelly, whom Phyllis married in 1979. They had one daughter, April Marie.
