= Eddie Bockman =

American baseball player and scout (1920–2011)

- Third baseman
- Born: July 26, 1920; Santa Ana, California, U.S.
- Died: September 29, 2011 (aged 91); Millbrae, California, U.S.
- Batted: Right Threw: Right

MLB debut
- September 11, 1946, for the New York Yankees

Last MLB appearance
- October 2, 1949, for the Pittsburgh Pirates

MLB statistics
- Batting average: .230
- Home runs: 11
- Runs batted in: 56
- Stats at Baseball Reference

Teams
- New York Yankees (1946); Cleveland Indians (1947); Pittsburgh Pirates (1948–1949)

Joseph Edward Bockman (July 26, 1920 – September 29, 2011) was an American professional baseball third baseman and scout, who played in Major League Baseball (MLB) for the New York Yankees (1946), Cleveland Indians (1947), and Pittsburgh Pirates (1948–1949). During his playing days, Bockman stood 5 feet 9 inches (1.75 m), weighing 175 pounds (79 kg); he batted and threw right-handed. His younger brother, Morley, played Minor League Baseball (MiLB) for the Riverside Rubes, in the Sunset League, among other teams.

== Playing career ==
Born in Santa Ana, California, Bockman was a triple-threat back for Woodrow Wilson Classical High School in Long Beach, California, in 1937.

While playing second base for the Fullerton, California All-Stars, Bockman hit a home run (HR) to help lead the team to a 16–4 victory over Fort Rosecrans, in August 1943. He also played third base for a Pacific Coast League All-Star team which featured Cleveland Indians pitcher Bob Feller. The All-Stars opposed the Kansas City Monarchs in an exhibition game at Wrigley Field (Los Angeles), on October 2, 1945, with Satchel Paige pitching for the Monarchs.

Bockman did not play pro baseball from 1943 to 1946, due to service in the United States Navy during World War II. While in the Navy, he was stationed in San Diego and played for the base team. He rose to the rank of Specialist 2nd Class Petty Officer. In September 1946, he joined the Yankees, then spent parts of the next three years with the Indians and Pirates.

Bockman's most productive seasons came with Pittsburgh, when he posted career-best all-around numbers, including a .239 batting average (BA), 23 runs batted in (RBI) and 23 runs scored, in 1948. Then, in 1949 he posted career-highs in games played (79) and HR (6), while driving in 19 runs and scoring 21 times. In April of that year, Bockman belted two home runs in a single game to give the Pirates a 3–1 victory over the Cincinnati Reds at Forbes Field. His two-run homer in the fourth inning scored Danny Murtaugh, who had walked.

Bockman's career MLB stat-line includes a .230 BA, 11 HR, and 56 RBI, in 199 games. Following his big league stint, he became a Minor League Baseball player-manager for the Albuquerque Dukes (1955), Visalia Cubs (1956), and Amarillo Gold Sox (1957–1958).

== Later life ==
Bockman later scouted for the Philadelphia Phillies, where he was credited for signing Bob Boone, Larry Bowa, Joe Charboneau, Buck Martinez, Ricky Jordan, Randy Lerch, Dick Ruthven, John Vukovich, and Bob Walk, among others. In 1992, after more than 30 years with the Phillies, he became a scout for the newly created Florida Marlins expansion team.

On September 29, 2011, Bockman died in Millbrae, California, at the age of 91. He is buried at Forest Lawn Memorial Park in Glendale, California.
