= Eric Wilkins =

American baseball player (born 1956)

- Pitcher
- Born: December 9, 1956; St. Louis, Missouri, U.S.
- Died: November 17, 2024 (aged 67); Everett, Washington, U.S.
- Batted: Right Threw: Right

MLB debut
- April 11, 1979, for the Cleveland Indians

Last MLB appearance
- July 23, 1979, for the Cleveland Indians

MLB statistics
- Games pitched: 16
- Win–loss record: 2–4
- Earned run average: 4.39
- Strikeouts: 52
- Stats at Baseball Reference

Teams
- Cleveland Indians (1979)

Eric Lamoine Wilkins (December 9, 1956 – November 17, 2024) was an American former Major League Baseball pitcher who played for one season. He pitched for the Cleveland Indians for 16 games during the 1979 Cleveland Indians season.

Wilkins attended Washington State University, where he played college baseball for the Cougars from 1975–1977.

Wilkins died on November 17, 2024 at the age of 67.
