= Horace Speed (baseball) =

American baseball player (1951–2025)

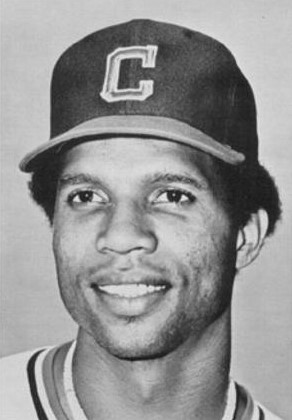
- Outfielder
- Born: October 4, 1951; Los Angeles, California, U.S.
- Died: May 26, 2025 (aged 73); Meridian, Mississippi, U.S.
- Batted: Right Threw: Right

MLB debut
- April 10, 1975, for the San Francisco Giants

Last MLB appearance
- June 26, 1979, for the Cleveland Indians

MLB statistics
- Batting average: .207
- Hits: 28
- Runs batted in: 6
- Stats at Baseball Reference

Teams
- San Francisco Giants (1975); Cleveland Indians (1978–1979)

Horace Arthur Speed III (October 4, 1951 – May 26, 2025) was an American Major League Baseball outfielder who played three seasons for the San Francisco Giants and the Cleveland Indians.

== Biography ==
Speed was selected by the Giants in the 3rd round of the 1969 MLB draft. He made his major league debut with San Francisco as a pinch runner for catcher Dave Rader in 1975, as the Giants defeated the San Diego Padres, 2–0. He then signed as a free agent with the Indians on December 7, 1977, and had his most productive major league season with the team in 1978, appearing in 70 games.

He made his final major league appearance in 1979, as a pinch runner for Cliff Johnson, in a Cleveland 4–3 loss to the Baltimore Orioles.

Speed died on May 26, 2025, at the age of 73.
