= Joe Charboneau =

American baseball player (born 1955)

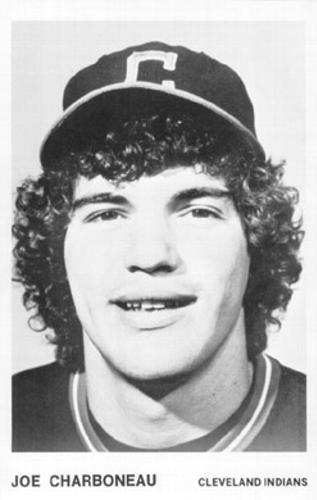
- Left fielder / Designated hitter
- Born: June 17, 1955 (age 71); Belvidere, Illinois, U.S.
- Batted: Right Threw: Right

MLB debut
- April 11, 1980, for the Cleveland Indians

Last MLB appearance
- June 1, 1982, for the Cleveland Indians

MLB statistics
- Batting average: .266
- Home runs: 29
- Runs batted in: 114
- Stats at Baseball Reference

Teams
- Cleveland Indians (1980–1982)

Career highlights and awards
- AL Rookie of the Year (1980)

Joseph Charboneau (born June 17, 1955) is an American former professional baseball left fielder and designated hitter who played three seasons with the Cleveland Indians of Major League Baseball (MLB) in the early 1980s.

After winning the AL Rookie of the Year award in 1980, Charboneau's career quickly flamed out amidst injuries, specifically a back ailment that never properly healed and restricted him for the next three years. He is one of the most oft-cited examples of baseball's fabled sophomore jinx, holding the record for the fewest career games played in the Major Leagues by a Rookie of the Year, with 201. That record has now been broken by Kyle Lewis, who won the Rookie of the Year award in 2020, but finished his Major League career appearing in only 146 games.

== Early life ==
Charboneau was born fifth of seven children. When he was young, his family relocated to Santa Clara, California and his father left the family shortly thereafter. He was raised in poverty by his single mother who worked as a hospital receptionist. In order to make money, Charboneau would fight in illegal bare-knuckle boxing matches in boxcars and warehouses. He broke his nose and was stabbed three times apiece.

Charboneau attended and played baseball for Buchser High School in Santa Clara. He was not highly recruited by colleges or scouted by professional teams. While still in high school, he did get the attention of Philadelphia Phillies scout Eddie Bockman, who attended one of Charboneau's games in order to scout his teammate, Steve Bartkowski.

== Baseball career ==
=== Early career ===
Bockman continued to keep tabs on Charboneau while he played college baseball at West Valley College. The 21-year-old Charboneau was originally drafted in the sixth round of the June 1976 draft by the Minnesota Twins, but he did not sign with them; when Bockman's Philadelphia Phillies made him their second-round pick in the December supplementary draft, Charboneau was sent to the Class A Western Carolina League, where he hit .298 in 43 games.

In 1977, Charboneau suddenly quit the Phillies' Carolina League affiliate after fighting with management, and went home to work as a stock clerk and play softball. The following year, Minnesota, the team that originally drafted Charboneau, gave him another chance and assigned him to Visalia of the California League. He responded with a .350 average, fourth-best in the league. At season's end, though, after participating in a barroom brawl, Charboneau was traded to the Cleveland Indians organization for major-league pitcher Cardell Camper.

=== "Super Joe" ===
Charboneau broke out in 1979 with a .352 average for the Indians' AA team in Chattanooga, pacing the Southern League.

In 1980, it looked like Charboneau was headed up to AAA Charleston—until Indians' slugger Andre Thornton was felled by a knee injury, giving Joe his shot at the big leagues.

Trouble continued to follow him; while in Mexico for an exhibition game on March 8, a crazed fan stuck Charboneau with a Bic pen. The pen penetrated four inches and hit a rib, but Charboneau played his first regular-season game just over a month later, on April 11. (The assailant was duly arrested and fined 50 pesos. "That's $2.27 for stabbing a person," Charboneau said.)

Charboneau soon became a fan favorite. Long before Dennis Rodman came on the scene, Charboneau became known for dyeing his hair, as well as his unusual way of consuming beer: through his nose. Other stories emerged about how he did his own dental work and fixed a broken nose with a pair of pliers and a few shots of Jack Daniel's whiskey, stood out; by mid-season, Charboneau was the subject of a song, "Go Joe Charboneau", that reached #3 on the local charts.

Despite a few nagging injures late in the season, Charboneau played 131 games in 1980, splitting time between left field and designated hitter. His .289 average coupled with 23 home runs and 87 RBI (leading the team in both categories) earned Charboneau the American League Rookie of the Year award, making him the first Indian to claim the award since Chris Chambliss in 1971.

=== Decline ===
Charboneau injured his back in a headfirst slide in spring training the following year. He tried to play through the pain but was hitting only .208 at the time of the 1981 Major League Baseball strike that interrupted the season. Just after the players came back in early August, though, Charboneau was sent to AAA Charleston, making him the first Rookie-of-the-Year to be returned the minors the following season. After 18 games with the Charlies (where he hit just .217), he returned to the big club on August 28. His final big-league numbers for 1981: .210 average, just four homers and 18 RBI in 138 at-bats. Charboneau underwent back surgery over the winter.

Things did not improve for Charboneau in 1982: after only 22 games with the Indians, Charboneau and his .214 average were shipped back to Charleston, then to AA Chattanooga again. Playing in the same league he had torn apart three years earlier, he could only manage a dismal .207 mark. Charboneau endured another back surgery after the season, but seemingly nothing could allow him to regain his timing at the plate. Finally, in 1983, when batting .200 for AA Buffalo, Charboneau gave jeering fans an obscene gesture, leading to his quick release.

However, the Pittsburgh Pirates took a flyer on him in 1984, and he managed a .289 average in the Carolina League (though at 29, he was easily the oldest player in the loop). A shot with the Pirates AAA team in Hawaii ended after 15 games, and "Super Joe" retired from the game. (Charboneau did make one more appearance in a baseball uniform that year, but only on celluloid; he was an extra in the film The Natural, playing one of Roy Hobbs' teammates.)

== After baseball ==
Charboneau dabbled in sports management after his retirement, and even hosted his own radio show for a time. He returned to baseball in 1999 with the Canton Crocodiles of the Frontier League, serving as hitting instructor, first base coach, and director of baseball operations through 2001. (He even stepped in as a pinch-hitter in 2000, hitting a single in his only at-bat.) He later worked for several other Frontier League teams in Washington, Windy City, Richmond and Chillicothe.

Charboneau had been the manager of the Lorain County Ironmen, a team playing in the Great Lakes Summer Collegiate League, a wood bat league allowing college players to play competitive baseball in the off-season. Charboneau was hired to manage the Ironmen by close friend and fellow former Cleveland Indians outfielder Kevin Rhomberg, who owned the team. However, the Ironmen folded after the 2019 season.

Prior to managing the Ironmen, Charboneau spent the 2014 baseball season as the hitting coach for the Lake Erie Crushers of the independent Frontier League.

He was the hitting coach at Notre Dame College in South Euclid, Ohio from 2016 through 2021.

== Personal life ==
Charboneau lives in North Ridgeville, Ohio with his wife Ellen. He has two children, Tyson (born 1979) and Dannon (born 1981) and six grandchildren.

In 2020 Charboneau suffered a stroke.
