= Cardell Camper =

American baseball player (1952–2010)

- Pitcher
- Born: July 6, 1952; Boley, Oklahoma, U.S.
- Died: December 7, 2010 (aged 58); Beaumont, California, U.S.
- Batted: Right Threw: Right

MLB debut
- September 11, 1977, for the Cleveland Indians

Last MLB appearance
- October 2, 1977, for the Cleveland Indians

MLB statistics
- Win–loss record: 1-0
- Earned run average: 3.86
- Strikeouts: 9
- Stats at Baseball Reference

Teams
- Cleveland Indians (1977)

Cardell Camper (July 6, 1952 – December 7, 2010) was an American professional baseball pitcher.

== Career ==
Camper played seven seasons in the minors, in the St. Louis Cardinals, Cleveland Indians and Philadelphia Phillies organizations; when the Indians expanded their roster in September 1977, Camper was brought up. He appeared in three games: pitching two scoreless innings September 11 (in Baltimore) and again on September 17 (at home against Toronto), before starting in Toronto October 2. The Blue Jays touched him for four runs on seven hits in six innings, but Camper got the win as the Tribe triumphed, 5–4. It was his last major league appearance.

That winter, Camper was traded to the Phillies for eccentric outfielder Joe Charboneau, who became the American League Rookie of the Year in 1980 before injuries ended his career. Camper's baseball career ended in 1979; he died in 2010.

In 1973, while playing for the GCL Red Birds, he was a teammate of Randy Poffo. Poffo would leave baseball and become a professional wrestler by the name "the Macho Man" Randy Savage.
