= Sandy Wihtol =

American baseball player (born 1955)

- Pitcher
- Born: June 1, 1955 (age 71); Palo Alto, California, U.S.
- Batted: Right Threw: Right

MLB debut
- September 7, 1979, for the Cleveland Indians

Last MLB appearance
- October 2, 1982, for the Cleveland Indians

MLB statistics
- Win–loss record: 1–0
- Earned run average: 3.75
- Innings pitched: 572/3
- Stats at Baseball Reference

Teams
- Cleveland Indians (1979–1980: 1982)

Alexander Ames Wihtol [Sandy] (born June 1, 1955) is an American former professional baseball player. A right-handed pitcher, he worked in 28 games — all in relief — over parts of three seasons (1979–1980; 1982) for the Cleveland Indians of Major League Baseball. He stood 6 feet 1 inch (1.85 m) tall and weighed 195 pounds (88 kg).

Wihtol's professional career lasted for nine seasons (1975–1983), all in the Cleveland organization. He attended Homestead High School (Cupertino, California), and De Anza College, also in Cupertino, and was selected by the Indians in the second round of the secondary phase of the June 1974 amateur draft.

After a strong 1979 season as a relief pitcher with the Triple-A Tacoma Tigers, Wihtol made his Cleveland and MLB debut that September when rosters expanded to 40 men. Although treated roughly in his first two outings, Wihtol was unscored upon in his last three appearances to post a creditable 3.38 earned run average, with ten hits allowed in 10 2/3 innings pitched. In 1980, Wihtol split the year between Tacoma and Cleveland; he worked in 17 games for the Indians from July through September and notched his only Major League win (on July 25 against the California Angels) and save (on September 30 against the New York Yankees). After spending all of 1981 and most of 1982 in Triple-A, Wihtol received a final trial with the Indians in September 1982, appearing in six more games without recording a decision or a save.

In 28 career Major League games, Wihtol allowed 54 hits and 24 bases on balls in 57 2/3 innings pitched, with 34 strikeouts. Since retiring from the game in 1984, Wihtol has been a full-time Realtor working and living on the San Francisco Peninsula and has stayed involved with the game by serving as head baseball coach of Los Altos High School.
