= Dave Garcia =

American baseball coach, scout, and manager (1920–2018)

- Manager
- Born: September 15, 1920; East St. Louis, Illinois, U.S.
- Died: May 21, 2018 (aged 97); San Diego, California, U.S.
- Batted: Right Threw: Right

MLB statistics
- Games: 618
- Win–loss record: 307–311
- Winning %: .497
- Stats at Baseball Reference

Teams
- As manager: California Angels (1977–1978); Cleveland Indians (1979–1982); As coach: San Diego Padres (1970–1973); Cleveland Indians (1975–1976; 1979); California Angels (1977); Milwaukee Brewers (1983–1984); Colorado Rockies (2000–2002)

David Garcia (September 15, 1920 – May 21, 2018) was an American coach, scout and manager in Major League Baseball who spent over 65 years in professional baseball. He served as manager of the California Angels (1977–78) and Cleveland Indians (1979–82). Including three games as acting manager of the 1975 Indians, during his first coaching tenure there, he compiled a career record of 310 wins and 311 defeats (.499).

== Career ==
1977 photocard of Garcia for California Angels as coach

Garcia was born in East St. Louis, Illinois, to Spanish immigrant parents and entered the game in 1939. Derailed by injury as a player, Garcia was a minor league infielder for almost 20 seasons — much of that time in the farm system of the New York Giants — and never made it to the major leagues. His playing career also was interrupted by three years (1943–45) of service in the United States Army Air Forces during World War II, and much of his later active career was spent as a player-manager in the low minor leagues. As the playing skipper of the 1951 Oshkosh Giants of the Class D Wisconsin State League, Garcia won the league's triple crown, with 23 home runs, 127 runs batted in and a batting average of .369. He threw and batted right-handed was listed as 6 feet (1.8 m) tall and 185 pounds (84 kg).

He began managing at age 27 in 1948 with the Giants' Knoxville Smokies farm team of the Class B Tri-State League, and would continue to manage in the New York and San Francisco Giants' minor league organization over the next two decades (1949–55; 1957; 1964; 1967–68). He also coached for Triple-A Minneapolis (1956) and scouted for the Giants (1957–63; 1965–66). Garcia then joined the San Diego Padres as a minor league manager in 1969, their maiden National League season.

The following season, in his 50th year, Garcia finally reached the majors as San Diego's third-base coach. He coached with the Padres (1970–73), Indians (1975–76; 1979) and Angels (1977) and in 1977 he was named manager of the Angels when Norm Sherry was fired on July 11. While the Angels continued to stumble under him in 1977 (with a 35–46 record), the Halos stood at 25–20 when Garcia was released in favor of Jim Fregosi on June 1, 1978.

Garcia got another chance to manage with the Cleveland Indians when Jeff Torborg was fired on July 23, 1979. Cleveland played at a 38–28 clip under Garcia for the remainder of the season, and compiled a mark of 52–51 during the strike-shortened 1981 campaign, but they never finished higher than fifth in the American League East. After a sixth-place finish in 1982, Garcia resigned under fire. But he remained in the game into his mid 80s, as a coach for the Milwaukee Brewers (1983–84), a special assignment scout for the Brewers and Kansas City Royals, and — from 2000–02 — a coach with the Colorado Rockies. Garcia was named to the Rockies' staff when he was 79 years of age by then-skipper Buddy Bell. He also scouted for other MLB teams, including the Seattle Mariners and Chicago Cubs.

As a minor league manager in the Giants, Padres and Angels organizations, Garcia won 889 games and lost 796 (.528) and won three championships. He is one of only four individuals to play, coach or announce professional baseball during part of eight decades. (Vin Scully, Tommy Lasorda and Don Zimmer being the other three.)

== Managerial Record ==
| Team | Year | Regular season | | | | | Postseason | | | |
| Team | Year | Games | Won | Lost | Win % | Finish | Won | Lost | Win % | Result |
|---|---|---|---|---|---|---|---|---|---|---|
| CAL | 1977 | 81 | 35 | 46 | .432 | Interim | – | – | – | |
| CAL | 1978 | 46 | 25 | 21 | .543 | Fired | – | – | – | |
| CAL total | | 127 | 60 | 67 | .472 | | 0 | 0 | – | |
| CLE | 1979 | 66 | 38 | 28 | .576 | Interim | – | – | – | |
| CLE | 1980 | 160 | 79 | 81 | .494 | 6th in the AL East | – | – | – | |
| CLE | 1981 | 50 | 26 | 24 | .520 | 6th in the AL East | – | – | – | |
| CLE | 1981 | 53 | 26 | 27 | .491 | 5th in the AL East | – | – | – | |
| CLE | 1982 | 162 | 78 | 84 | .481 | 7th in the AL East | – | – | – | |
| CLE total | | 491 | 244 | 247 | .497 | | 0 | 0 | – | |
| Total | | 618 | 307 | 311 | .497 | | 0 | 0 | – | |

== Personal life ==
Garcia's son David was the Yankees first-round pick—the 11th player taken overall—in the secondary phase of the January 1978 draft. He spent two years in the Yankee systems. Garcia also had two grandsons play professional baseball. Drew Garcia was a 21st round draft choice of the Chicago White Sox in 2008, and reached the Triple-A level. In 2010, the St. Louis Cardinals selected his grandson, Greg Garcia in the seventh round of Major League Baseball draft. He made his MLB debut for the Cardinals in April 2014.

Dave Garcia died in San Diego, his permanent home since 1961, of natural causes at the age of 97.
