= Jeff Torborg =

American baseball player and manager (1941–2025)

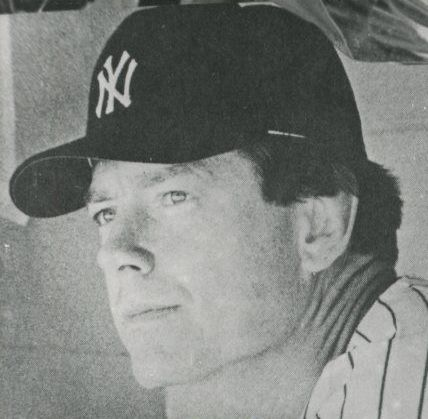
- Torborg with the Yankees in 1982
- Catcher
- Born: November 26, 1941; Plainfield, New Jersey, U.S.
- Died: January 19, 2025 (aged 83); Port Orange, Florida, U.S.
- Batted: Right Threw: Right

MLB debut
- May 10, 1964, for the Los Angeles Dodgers

Last MLB appearance
- September 29, 1973, for the California Angels

MLB statistics
- Batting average: .214
- Home runs: 8
- Runs batted in: 101
- Managerial record: 634–718
- Winning %: .469
- Stats at Baseball Reference
- Managerial record at Baseball Reference

Teams
- As player: Los Angeles Dodgers (1964–1970); California Angels (1971–1973); As manager: Cleveland Indians (1977–1979); Chicago White Sox (1989–1991); New York Mets (1992–1993); Montreal Expos (2001); Florida Marlins (2002–2003); As coach: New York Yankees (1979–1988)

Career highlights and awards
- World Series champion (1965); AL Manager of the Year (1990)

Jeffrey Allen Torborg (November 26, 1941 – January 19, 2025) was an American professional baseball catcher and manager. He played in Major League Baseball (MLB) for the Los Angeles Dodgers and California Angels from 1964 to 1973. He managed the Cleveland Indians, Chicago White Sox, New York Mets, Montreal Expos, and Florida Marlins.

== Playing career ==
Torborg grew up in Westfield, New Jersey, where he was the catcher on the Westfield High School baseball team. He attended Rutgers University and played college baseball for the Rutgers Scarlet Knights from 1961 to 1963. In 1963, Torborg had a .537 batting average and was named an All-American.

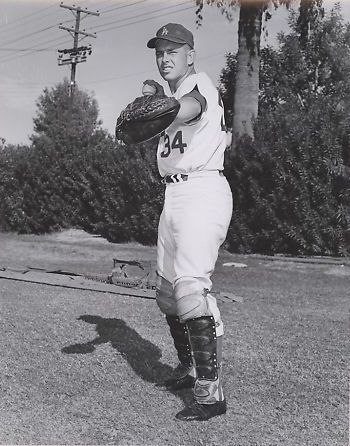
Torborg with the Dodgers in 1964

The Los Angeles Dodgers signed Torborg as an amateur free agent in 1963. After playing in the minor leagues in 1963, Torborg made the Dodgers' roster as their third-string catcher in 1964 behind John Roseboro and Doug Camilli. On September 9, 1965, Torborg caught Sandy Koufax's perfect game. On July 20, 1970, he was the catcher receiving Bill Singer's no-hitter.

On March 13, 1971, the Dodgers sold Torborg's contract to the California Angels. On May 15, 1973, Torborg also caught the first of Nolan Ryan's seven no-hitters, making Torborg only the second catcher to catch a no hitter in both leagues. Gus Triandos was the first having caught Hoyt Wilhelm no hitter with the AL's Orioles in 1958 and was behind the plate for Jim Bunning's perfect game with the NL's Phillies in 1964. He was traded from the Angels to the St. Louis Cardinals for John Andrews at the Winter Meetings on December 6, 1973. On March 25, 1974, he was released by the Cardinals.

== Coaching, managing, and broadcasting career ==
In 1977, Torborg became the bullpen coach of the Cleveland Indians. On June 19th, the Indians fired manager Frank Robinson and Torborg assumed the position. Torborg's first two games as a major league manager came that day in a doubleheader against the Detroit Tigers, with Cleveland defeating the Tigers in both games, 4-2 and 4-0. Torborg's Indians proceeded to win his first seven games as Cleveland manager, which also extended an Indians win streak to nine games before the team lost to Detroit 6-4 at Tiger Stadium on June 25th. Torborg held the position as Indians manager for three years, compiling a 157-201 record.

He was a coach on the New York Yankees from 1979 to 1988. In 1989, Torborg left the Yankees to become the manager of the Chicago White Sox. A year after he took the helm, the White Sox won 94 games, which was a 25-game improvement from the team's 1989 season. For his efforts with the 1990 White Sox, Torborg won the American League Manager of the Year Award. Torborg stayed with the White Sox for one more year before moving to the New York Mets on a four-year deal of $1.7 million that dwarfed his previous deal of $250,000 a year.

A year after leading the White Sox to an 87–75 (.537) win-loss record, Torborg's 1992 New York Mets posted a 70–92 (.432) record. After starting the 1993 season with a 13–25 (.342) record, the Mets fired Torborg and replaced him with Dallas Green.

For the rest of the 1990s, Torborg worked as a sportscaster for the likes of CBS Radio and Fox. At CBS Radio, Torborg served as a color commentator for three World Series (1995–1997) alongside Vin Scully. While at Fox, Torborg served as a color commentator from 1996 to 2000.

Torborg returned to managing in May of 2001 to replace Montreal Expos manager Felipe Alou, on a three-year deal. When Jeffrey Loria, who had owned the Expos, sold the team and bought the Florida Marlins in 2002, he brought Torborg to Florida with him to serve as manager. The team went 79–83 (.488) that year. After starting the 2003 season with a 16–22 (.421) record, the Marlins fired Torborg. Jack McKeon was hired to replace him and led the team to a 2003 World Series victory. Torborg held no ill will for the firing, saying "there was no bitterness", and adding that he was "thrilled" that the team had gone on to win the World Series that year. Torborg also felt that there must have been a larger purpose at play, as he was in the right place at the right time in September. Instead of being with the Marlins, he was at his summer home in New Jersey painting his dock when he noticed a two year child had fallen into the water. Torborg was able to rescue the toddler, saving his life.

Torborg returned to broadcasting for Fox. He served as the color commentator for Atlanta Braves games on FSN South and Turner South in 2006, where he was partnered with Bob Rathbun. Neither Torborg nor Rathbun was retained for the 2007 season.

== Personal life and death ==
Torborg was of Danish descent. His son, Dale, is a former professional wrestler and his daughter-in-law, Christi Wolf, is a bodybuilder and former professional wrestler.

Torborg married Suzie Barber on June 6, 1963. For more than 25 years, Torborg lived with his family in a home in Mountainside, New Jersey.

Torborg later developed Parkinson's disease. He died in Port Orange, Florida on January 19, 2025, at the age of 83.

== Managerial record ==
Team	Year	Regular season					Postseason			
Team	Year	Games	Won	Lost	Win %	Finish	Won	Lost	Win %	Result
CLE	1977	104	45	59	.433	5th in AL East	–	–	–	–
CLE	1978	159	69	90	.434	6th in AL East	–	–	–	–
CLE	1979	95	43	52	.453	fired	–	–	–	–
CLE total		358	157	201	.439		0	0	–	
CWS	1989	161	69	92	.429	7th in AL West	–	–	–	–
CWS	1990	162	94	68	.580	2nd in AL West	–	–	–	–
CWS	1991	162	87	75	.537	2nd in AL West	–	–	–	–
CWS total		485	250	235	.515		0	0	–	
NYM	1992	162	72	90	.444	5th in NL East	–	–	–	–
NYM	1993	38	13	25	.342	fired	–	–	–	–
NYM total		200	85	115	.425		0	0	–	
MON	2001	109	47	62	.431	5th in NL East	–	–	–	–
MON total		109	47	62	.431		0	0	–	
FLA	2002	162	79	83	.488	4th in NL East	–	–	–	–
FLA	2003	38	16	22	.421	fired	–	–	–	–
FLA total		200	95	105	.475		0	0	–	
Total		1352	634	718	.469		0	0	–	

Preceded by Johnny Bench	World Series network radio color commentator 1995–1997	Succeeded by Joe Morgan
