= Paul Reuschel =

American baseball player (born 1947)

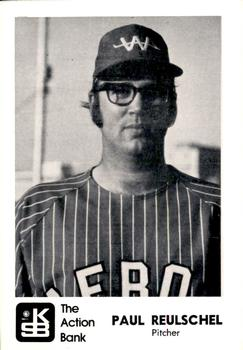
- Pitcher
- Born: January 12, 1947 (age 79); Quincy, Illinois, U.S.
- Batted: Right Threw: Right

MLB debut
- July 25, 1975, for the Chicago Cubs

Last MLB appearance
- September 28, 1979, for the Cleveland Indians

MLB statistics
- Win–loss record: 16−16
- Earned run average: 4.51
- Strikeouts: 188
- Stats at Baseball Reference

Teams
- Chicago Cubs (1975–1978); Cleveland Indians (1978–1979)

Paul Richard Reuschel (born January 12, 1947) is an American former professional baseball pitcher. He played all or part of five seasons in Major League Baseball from 1975 to 1979.

Reuschel began his professional career when he was drafted by the Chicago Cubs in the fourth round of the 1968 amateur draft. On August 21, 1975, he and his brother Rick Reuschel became, to date, the only siblings to combine to pitch a shutout. Rick started a game for the Cubs and pitched 6.1 innings against the Los Angeles Dodgers. Paul pitched the final 2.2 innings for the Cubs' 7–0 win.
