= Ron Pruitt =

American baseball player (born 1951)

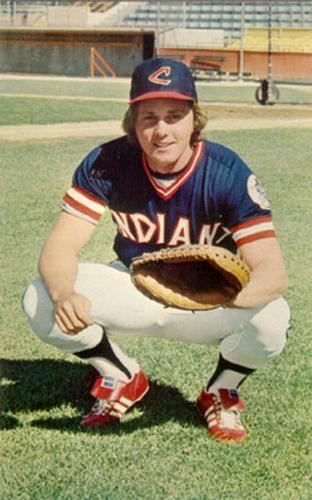
- Outfielder / Catcher
- Born: October 21, 1951 (age 74); Flint, Michigan, U.S.
- Batted: Right Threw: Right

MLB debut
- June 25, 1975, for the Texas Rangers

Last MLB appearance
- April 9, 1983, for the San Francisco Giants

MLB statistics
- Batting average: .269
- Home runs: 12
- Runs batted in: 92
- Stats at Baseball Reference

Teams
- Texas Rangers (1975); Cleveland Indians (1976–1980); Chicago White Sox (1980); Cleveland Indians (1981); San Francisco Giants (1982–1983)

Ronald Ralph Pruitt (born October 21, 1951) is an American former professional baseball player. He played all or part of nine seasons in Major League Baseball for the Texas Rangers (1975), Cleveland Indians (1976–80 and 1981), Chicago White Sox (1980) and San Francisco Giants (1982–83). Primarily an outfielder, he also played substantially at catcher.

After attending Flint Central High School, Pruitt was drafted out of Michigan State University by the Rangers in 1972. In 9 seasons he played in 341 games and had 795 at bats, 88 runs scored, 214 hits, 28 doubles, 4 triples, 12 home runs, 92 RBI, 8 stolen bases, 94 walks (7 intentional), a .269 batting average, a .345 on-base percentage, a .360 slugging percentage, 286 total bases, 7 sacrifice hits, and 7 sacrifice flies.

Pruitt was traded along with Stan Thomas from the Rangers to the Indians for John Ellis at the Winter Meetings on December 9, 1975.

On September 30, 1982, Ron had a late-season ninth inning walk-off single to overcome a 6–5 deficit to give the Giants a 7–6 win over the Astros in the midst of a division race.
