= Don Hood =

American baseball player (1949–2023)

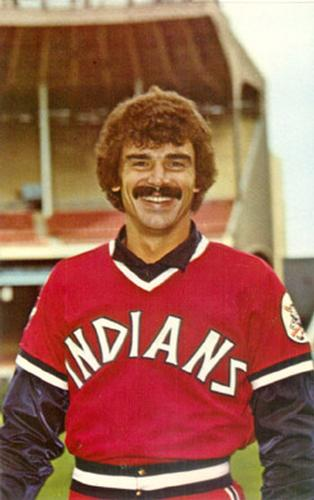
- Pitcher
- Born: October 16, 1949; Florence, South Carolina, U.S.
- Died: June 10, 2023 (aged 73); Florence, South Carolina, U.S.
- Batted: Left Threw: Left

MLB debut
- July 16, 1973, for the Baltimore Orioles

Last MLB appearance
- October 2, 1983, for the Kansas City Royals

MLB statistics
- Win–loss record: 34–35
- Earned run average: 3.79
- Strikeouts: 374
- Stats at Baseball Reference

Teams
- Baltimore Orioles (1973–1974); Cleveland Indians (1975–1979); New York Yankees (1979); St. Louis Cardinals (1980); Kansas City Royals (1982–1983)

Donald Harris Hood (October 16, 1949 – June 10, 2023) was an American professional baseball player. He played in the Major League Baseball as a left-handed pitcher from 1973 to 1983 for the Baltimore Orioles, New York Yankees, Cleveland Indians, St. Louis Cardinals, and the Kansas City Royals.

== Baseball career ==
Hood was born in Florence, South Carolina. He pitched as both a starting pitcher and as a relief pitcher during his major league career. Hood was selected in the first round, 17th overall, in the 1969 Major League Baseball draft by the Baltimore Orioles. He made his major league debut on July 16, 1973, pitching in relief of starter Jesse Jefferson in a 7–5 Baltimore victory over the Oakland Athletics at Oakland–Alameda County Coliseum. He and Boog Powell were traded to the Cleveland Indians for Dave Duncan and minor league outfielder Alvin McGrew on February 25 1975. He would spend the next four-and-a-half seasons in Cleveland, appearing in a career high 41 games in 1977.

During the 1979 season Hood was traded to the New York Yankees for catcher/designated hitter Cliff Johnson. He appeared in 27 games with New York that season, finishing with a 3.07 ERA.

Following the 1979 season, Hood was granted free agency and he subsequently signed with the St. Louis Cardinals on March 13, 1980. He appeared in just 33 games with the Cardinals, as the club released him on October 25, 1980.

Hood then signed with the Kansas City Royals before the 1981 season and appeared in 57 games over the next two seasons. His final major league appearance came on October 2, 1983, at Oakland–Alameda County Coliseum, in an 8–4 Royals' loss.

== Death ==
Hood died on June 10, 2023, at the age of 73.
