= Jim Norris =

American baseball player (born 1948)

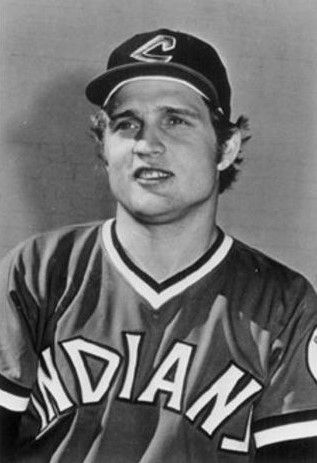
- Outfielder
- Born: December 20, 1948 (age 77); Brooklyn, New York, U.S.
- Batted: Left Threw: Left

MLB debut
- April 7, 1977, for the Cleveland Indians

Last MLB appearance
- October 5, 1980, for the Texas Rangers

MLB statistics
- Batting average: .264
- Home runs: 7
- Runs batted in: 110
- Stats at Baseball Reference

Teams
- Cleveland Indians (1977–1979); Texas Rangers (1980)

James Francis Norris (born December 20, 1948) is a former professional baseball outfielder. He played in Major League Baseball from 1977 to 1980 for the Cleveland Indians and Texas Rangers, playing all three outfield positions.

== Amateur career ==
Born in Brooklyn, New York, Norris graduated from Seaford High School, and was selected by the Chicago White Sox in the 31st round of the 1967 MLB draft. Rather than turn professional, he opted to attend the University of Maryland, where he became a three-time All-ACC outfielder. In 1969 and 1970, he played collegiate summer baseball for the Orleans Cardinals of the Cape Cod Baseball League, and was named league MVP in 1969 with a league-leading .415 batting average.

== Professional career ==
He was selected by the Cincinnati Reds in the 2nd round of the 1970 MLB draft, but did not sign. In the 1971 draft, he was taken in the 5th round by the Cleveland Indians, and broke into the major leagues with the Indians in the 1977 season. He batted .270 with 26 stolen bases in 133 games during his rookie season. Prior to the 1980 season, he was dealt to the Texas Rangers in a multi-player trade. He played one year with the Rangers, and retired after spending the 1981 season with Triple-A Wichita.

== Honors ==
In 2002, he was named to the ACC's 50th anniversary baseball team, and in 2004 he was inducted into the Cape Cod Baseball League Hall of Fame.
