= Wayne Garland =

American baseball player (born 1950)

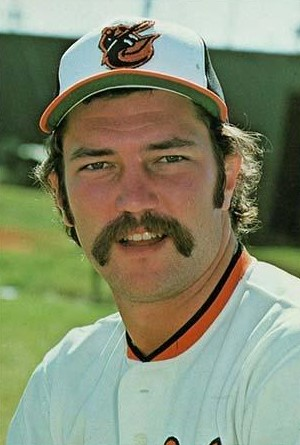
- Pitcher
- Born: October 26, 1950 (age 75); Nashville, Tennessee, U.S.
- Batted: Right Threw: Right

MLB debut
- September 13, 1973, for the Baltimore Orioles

Last MLB appearance
- September 25, 1981, for the Cleveland Indians

MLB statistics
- Win–loss record: 55–66
- Earned run average: 3.89
- Strikeouts: 450
- Stats at Baseball Reference

Teams
- Baltimore Orioles (1973–1976); Cleveland Indians (1977–1981)

Marcus Wayne Garland (born October 26, 1950) is an American former professional baseball player. A right-hander, he pitched in the major leagues for nine seasons from 1973 to 1981 for the Baltimore Orioles (1973–1976) and Cleveland Indians (1977–1981). He was one of the first 24 ballplayers who profited from the advent of MLB free agency following the 1976 season, when he became the first MLB player to sign a 10-year contract.

== Amateur career ==
Garland was born on October 26, 1950, in Nashville, Tennessee. He played both basketball and baseball at Cohn High School in Nashville.

He was drafted by the Pittsburgh Pirates in the fifth round of the 1968 Major League Baseball draft, but did not sign and attended Gulf Coast Junior College. He was then selected in the 1969 Major League Baseball draft by the St. Louis Cardinals, but again, did not sign a contract. The Orioles drafted him in the 1969 secondary draft and inked him to a contract.

== Professional career ==
=== Baltimore Orioles ===
Garland pitched for several years in the minor leagues posting generally lackluster numbers with a 7–9 record in 1972 and 10–11 in 1973. However, in 1973, he led the Rochester Red Wings with 141 strikeouts. He was called up to the major leagues in September 1973 and made his debut on September 13, 1973. In his first start on September 27, Garland was the losing pitcher. After spring training in 1974, he was sent back to Rochester, but was called up in May as a relief pitcher. Over the season, he made six starts, including a game where he pitched eight innings of no-hit baseball. He continued pitching mostly in relief in 1975 and the first half of 1976. After the Orioles traded Ken Holtzman and Doyle Alexander to the New York Yankees in June, a spot in the starting rotation opened for Garland. He made the most of his opportunity with a 10–2 by July and finished with 20 wins against seven losses. He played 1976 without a contract and rejected a mid-season contract offer from the Orioles of $40,000, which would allow him to become a free agent. Garland did not get along with manager Earl Weaver and was prepared to leave the team.

=== Cleveland Indians ===
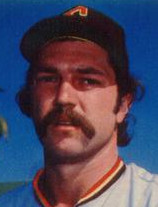
Garland with the Cleveland Indians

The Seitz decision allowed players to become free agents for the first time and 25 players entered the 1976 free-agent re-entry draft, which would allow teams to draft negotiating rights with players. Garland was selected in the draft by 12 teams, the maximum allowed. He signed a 10-year contract with the Cleveland Indians worth a reported $2.3 million, one of the richest of that initial free-agent class, and the first 10-year contract for a player in major league history.

Garland had a 13–19 record and a 3.59 ERA but began to feel pain in his pitching arm. In his first spring training game of 1978, he injured his arm, but continued pitching after receiving cortisone. After six regular season starts, he was diagnosed with a torn rotator cuff and underwent surgery. He would sit the rest of the season out while he recovered.

He returned in 1979 but had two more stints on the disabled list and finished the year with a record of 4–10. Garland's 1980 campaign was a bit better as he threw 150 innings for Cleveland and had a record of 6–9, but threw a two-hit shutout on July 3. The 1981 season was interrupted by a players strike that lasted two months. He was working as a knuckleballer to overcome the shoulder injuries that damaged his arm. After the season, Garland was released by the Indians. After being released, he was unable to get a tryout with any major league teams or any AAA minor league clubs. He attempted a comeback as a knuckleballer with the Yankees AA minor league affiliate, but was released before getting another chance in the major leagues.

== Coaching career ==
In the late 1980s he was a pitching coach for the Nashville Sounds and worked in the Pirates organization as a coach in the 1990s but a sore back (one that required six surgeries) derailed him from continuing to serve as a coach.
