= Jim Kern =

American baseball player (born 1949)

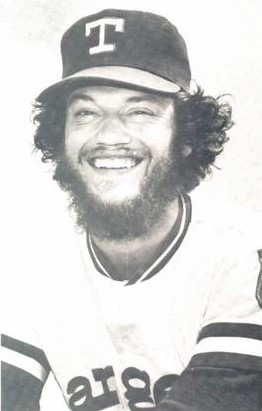
- Pitcher
- Born: March 15, 1949 (age 76); Gladwin, Michigan, U.S.
- Batted: Right Threw: Right

MLB debut
- September 6, 1974, for the Cleveland Indians

Last MLB appearance
- May 30, 1986, for the Cleveland Indians

MLB statistics
- Win–loss record: 53–57
- Earned run average: 3.32
- Strikeouts: 651
- Saves: 88
- Stats at Baseball Reference

Teams
- Cleveland Indians (1974–1978); Texas Rangers (1979–1981); Cincinnati Reds (1982); Chicago White Sox (1982–1983); Philadelphia Phillies (1984); Milwaukee Brewers (1984–1985); Cleveland Indians (1986)

Career highlights and awards
- 3× All-Star (1977–1979); AL Rolaids Relief Man Award (1979)

James Lester Kern (born March 15, 1949) is an American former professional baseball pitcher. A three time American League All-Star (1977–1979), Kern went 13–5 with a 1.57 ERA and 29 saves out of the Texas Rangers' bullpen in 1979 to finish fourth in American League Cy Young Award balloting.

== Career ==
=== Cleveland Indians ===
In 1967, Kern signed with the Cleveland Indians out of Midland High School in Midland, Michigan, at eighteen years old as a free agent with an overpowering fastball. He played six years in the minor leagues and winter ball seasons in Mexico, then missed the 1969 baseball season serving in the United States Marine Corps. In 1974 in AAA Oklahoma City of the American Association, he won the Allie Reynolds Award as the best pitcher in the league with a 17–7 record, striking out 220 batters in 189 innings and 19 strike outs in a nine inning game. During the 1973 and 1974 minor league seasons Kern was 28–14, striking out a total of 402 batters in 355 innings. He had an even 47–47 record over six seasons as a starting pitcher in the Indians' farm system when he received a September call-up in 1974. In his major league debut, he pitched a complete game in which he held the Baltimore Orioles to just one run. The Indians were, however, held scoreless by Orioles pitcher Mike Cuellar.

Kern had a 1.82 ERA as a reliever in 1975 when he was moved into the starting rotation. He was 1–2 with a 4.79 ERA as a starter when the Indians traded Gaylord Perry to the Texas Rangers for Jim Bibby, Rick Waits, Jackie Brown and $100,000 on June 13. In order to make room on the major league roster for the two additional pitchers acquired, Kern was optioned to the triple A Oklahoma City 89ers. Recalled in late June, he strained a muscle in his shoulder in July and sat out the remainder of the season.

He returned to the Indians in 1976 as a full-time reliever, making just two spot starts, and was 10–7 with a 2.37 ERA and fifteen saves. Kern and Dave LaRoche were named as the best relief in Indian history after the 2016 season. Early in the 1977 season, the Indians traded closer LaRoche to the California Angels, opening the door for Kern to inherit the job. He was 2–3 with seven saves and a 2.84 ERA in his new job at the All-Star break and was named, along with teammate Dennis Eckersley, to his first All-Star squad, pitching a perfect inning, striking out two. For the season, he finished with a 10–7 record and fourth in the American League with eighteen saves. He was the Indians' sole representative at the 1978 game in San Diego.

=== Texas Rangers ===
Kern and Larvell Blanks were traded to the Rangers for Bobby Bonds and Len Barker on October 3, 1978. He was dominant from the moment he arrived in Texas. He was 10–2 with a 1.48 ERA and sixteen saves at the 1979 All-Star break to earn his third consecutive selection to the AL squad. Kern came into the game in the seventh inning with the American League leading 6–5, then gave up an eighth inning home run to the New York Mets' Lee Mazzilli, allowing the National League to tie the score. Mazzilli returned to the plate an inning later with the bases loaded and two outs. AL manager Bob Lemon pulled Kern in favor of New York Yankees ace Ron Guidry. Guidry walked Mazzilli, allowing the winning run to score, and giving Kern the loss.

Kern remained hot in the second half, going 3–3 with a 1.72 ERA and thirteen saves. His 29 saves for the season were second only to the Minnesota Twins' Mike Marshall and his 13 wins were the most by a reliever. He was selected The Sporting News and Rolaids Relief Man of the Year, as well as being named the right-handed pitcher on The Sporting News AL All-Star Team that season. Kern was named the American League pitcher of the month for May 1979 going 4–0 with four saves, striking out 31 in 14 games and posting a 0.61 ERA. He was 4th in the balloting for the Cy Young Award and 11th for the balloting of the Most Valuable Player Award while being named the Texas Ranger Pitcher of the Year. Kern pitched 143 innings over 71 games in 1979, both career highs.

Working in the first year of a 5-year contract in 1980, he tried to pitch through a hyper extended elbow sustained in spring training and then a neck injury during the season, going 3–11 with two saves and a 4.83 ERA in 38 games before going on the disabled list for the rest of the season in July.

Injuries sustained during the 1980 season limited Kern to just seven innings pitched in the first half of the strike shortened 1981 season. However, he returned strong in the second half, going 1–2 with a 2.74 ERA and five saves in seventeen appearances. At the 1981 Winter meetings, he was traded to the New York Mets for Dan Boitano and Doug Flynn, however, before he could make an appearance with his new club, he was packaged with Greg Harris and Alex Treviño, and sent to the Cincinnati Reds for slugger George Foster.

Kern holds a number of all-time single season relief records for his 1979 season with the Texas Rangers including most wins out of the bullpen in a season with 13, the most inning pitched with 143 and the most strike outs with 136. He also holds the lowest earned run average in the history of the Texas Rangers for a pitcher with 100 or more innings in a season (1.57 ERA) and the lowest career earned run average for a pitcher with 200 or more innings (2.59 ERA). Kern also owns the second longest consecutive scoreless innings streak in Ranger history with 24 2/3 innings. In three All-Star appearances, Kern pitched a total of 4 1/3 innings giving up two runs while striking out five.

=== Journeyman ===
Kern pitched respectably in Cincinnati, in 1982 going 3–5 with a 2.84 ERA and two saves, however, he was unhappy with the Reds' rule against facial hair, and asked to be traded. The Reds accommodated Kern's wish, and sent him to the Chicago White Sox for two minor leaguers. After finishing out the 1982 season in Chicago, Kern made just one appearance in the second game of the 1983 season before he was placed on the disabled list after tearing two tendons and a ligament and dislocating his elbow. Kern accused the White Sox of using him improperly by asking him to throw in a game after an injection, causing him to tear two tendons. He was operated on in April and sat the summer out on the disabled list. The White Sox released him in March 1984 while he was still on the disabled list.

Decimated by injuries to their pitching staff, the Philadelphia Phillies signed Kern in June 1984 while he was rehabilitating. Facing the Pittsburgh Pirates in extra innings, Kern gave up seven runs (six earned) in just one inning of work to take the loss in his first appearance in 14 months with his new team. He was released on July 27 to make room on the roster for Tug McGraw, who was returning from a shoulder injury. Kern signed a minor league deal with the Milwaukee Brewers shortly afterwards and was called up that September, appearing in six games without giving up a run.

He also appeared in five games with the Brewers early in the 1985 season. He pitched three hitless innings in his first game of the season, but pitched poorly afterwards and was released on June 17 with a 6.55 ERA. The highlight of his 1985 season was when he pulled off an unassisted double play against the Seattle Mariners on May 6. He became the first pitcher to pull off this feat since Jim Umbarger in 1975.

Kern returned to the Cleveland Indians as a non-roster invitee to spring training in February 1986. Kern made the opening day roster but on May 12, Kern suffered one of the worst outings of his career against the Texas Rangers. In a little over an inning pitched, Kern gave up eight runs (seven earned) to see his ERA balloon from 3.46 to 7.53. On his way off the field, frustrated Indians fans began throwing garbage on the field, just missing Kern with a bottle. Kern's response was, "I knew they couldn't hit me as they were one of my fans". Kern was released and retired on June 17.

=== Retirement ===
Kern is an outdoor enthusiast, and in 1987, he started the Emu Outfitting Company, which was named after his major league nickname, the "Amazing" Emu in Arlington, Texas, an outdoor adventure company that books and operates hunting, fishing, and photographic trips in North and South America. From 1998 to 2014, he was general manager of the American offices of two peacock bass fishing operations in Brazil's Amazon and general manager of three fishing and hunting lodges in Southwest Alaska.

Kern also did color commentary for college and Major League Baseball games for Fox Sports, Home Sports Entertainment, and Prime Sports. In 1994, he created and hosted Nolan Ryan's First Spring Turkey Hunt for Fox Sports.

In 2006, Kern was named as one of the greatest Texas Rangers pitchers of all time.

In 2013, FanGraphs named Kern as the best relief pitcher in baseball history over a given 4-year period of time in their January 25 article "Jim Kern's Four Incredible Seasons." From 1976 to 1979, he won 42 games and registered 75 saves out of the bullpen, and he averaged more than 100 innings per year and 1.88 innings pitched per game appearance.
