= Gene Dusan =

Gene Paul Dusan (born November 9, 1949, in Los Angeles, California) is an American former Major League Baseball coach and minor league baseball player and manager. Dusan was a coach for the New York Mets in 1983. Dusan played in the minor leagues for nine seasons, from 1968 through 1976 including six in AAA leagues, mostly as a catcher. Overall, he played 765 minor league games, with 596 hits, 4 home runs and 100 RBIs in 2238 at bats. His career minor league batting average was .266, with an on-base percentage of .306 and a slugging percentage of .312. He also managed in the minor leagues for nine seasons, from 1977 through 1982, and after his stint coaching the Mets, from 1984 through 1986. Five of his managerial seasons were in AAA. He managed 1214 games, winning 630 and losing 583, for a winning percentage of .519. Dusan was the Oakland A's first round draft pick in 1968, after attending Long Beach City College.

He was sent to St. Louis from the Oakland Athletics on October 27, 1972, to complete a transaction from two months prior on August 30 when the Cardinals obtained minor-league third baseman Joe Lindsey for Dal Maxvill.
