= Andre Thornton =

American baseball player (born 1949)

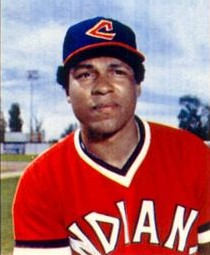
- First baseman / Designated hitter
- Born: August 13, 1949 (age 76); Tuskegee, Alabama, U.S.
- Batted: Right Threw: Right

MLB debut
- July 28, 1973, for the Chicago Cubs

Last MLB appearance
- August 31, 1987, for the Cleveland Indians

MLB statistics
- Batting average: .254
- Home runs: 253
- Runs batted in: 895
- Stats at Baseball Reference

Teams
- Chicago Cubs (1973–1976); Montreal Expos (1976); Cleveland Indians (1977–1979, 1981–1987)

Career highlights and awards
- 2× All-Star (1982, 1984); Silver Slugger Award (1984); Roberto Clemente Award (1979); Cleveland Guardians Hall of Fame

André Thornton (born August 13, 1949), nicknamed "Thunder", is an American former professional baseball player and business entrepreneur. He played in Major League Baseball as a first baseman and designated hitter from 1973 to 1987, most prominently as a member of the Cleveland Indians where, he was a two-time All-Star player and won a Silver Slugger Award. He also played for the Chicago Cubs and the Montreal Expos.

In 1979, Thornton was named the recipient of the prestigious Roberto Clemente Award for his involvement in local community affairs. After his playing career, Thornton owned a chain of restaurants as well as his own sports marketing firm. He was also the CEO and chairman of a supply chain management company. In 2001, he was voted one of the 100 greatest players in Cleveland Indians' history by a panel of veteran baseball writers, executives and historians. Thornton was inducted into the Cleveland Guardians Hall of Fame in 2007.

== Early years ==
Thornton grew up in Phoenixville, Pennsylvania, in a family of athletes, and graduated from Phoenixville Area High School. In 1967, a week before his 18th birthday, the Philadelphia Phillies signed Thornton as an amateur free agent. He played Minor League Baseball in the Phillies organization from 1967 through 1972. In 1972, the Phillies traded Thornton to the Atlanta Braves with Joe Hoerner for Jim Nash and Gary Neibauer. The Braves traded Thornton to the Chicago Cubs for Joe Pepitone on May 19, 1973.

== Major league career ==
=== Chicago Cubs ===
Thornton made his major-league debut with the Cubs on July 28, 1973, as a pinch hitter. He collected his first hit on August 3, in a win over the Montreal Expos. He was named to the 1974 All-Rookie Team as a first baseman by Baseball Digest. Thornton had one of his best seasons in 1975; although his 18 home runs were only the seventh-best season total of his career, he hit .293 with a .428 on-base percentage and a slugging percentage of .516. It was the first of six seasons during his career in which Thornton walked more than he struck out. Thornton played for the Cubs until May 1976, appearing in 271 games with a batting average of .267 with 30 home runs and 122 RBIs.

=== Montreal Expos ===
Thornton was traded to Montreal on May 17, 1976, for Larry Biittner and Steve Renko. He played in 69 games for Montreal through the end of the season. Overall for 1976, in which he battled injuries, Thornton hit .194 with 11 home runs and 38 RBIs.

=== Cleveland Indians ===
Thornton was dealt from the Expos to the Cleveland Indians for Jackie Brown on December 10, 1976. The trade would prove to be one of the most lopsided deals of the 1970s, as Brown would only pitch one more year in the majors. Thornton sustained high levels of production through much of his Cleveland career. After hitting 28 home runs in 1977, his debut season in Cleveland, Thornton hit a career-high 33 home runs in 1978 (a total he would match in 1984). In 1979, he was honored with the Roberto Clemente Award, given to the player who best exemplifies the game of baseball, sportsmanship, community involvement, and team contribution. Thornton missed all of 1980 with a severe knee injury that required two surgeries, and all but 69 games in 1981 due to other injuries.

From 1981 to 1984, Thornton played primarily as a designated hitter. In 1982, Thornton hit 32 home runs and set career highs with 116 runs batted in, 109 walks, and 285 total bases. From 1982 through 1986, a healthy Thornton appeared in an average of 140 games each season, and hit a total of 121 home runs with 446 RBIs while hitting for a .261 average. He won a Silver Slugger Award as a designated hitter in 1984, and then played exclusively as a designated hitter from 1985 to 1987. In 1987, he started 12 of the first 20 games, but injuries and a decision to essentially bench him kept him out of all but 24 games for the rest of the season, including only seven starts. He retired after the season.

Overall, in his ten seasons with the Indians, Thornton appeared in 1,225 games, batting .254 with 214 home runs and 749 RBIs. He spent most of his career as one of the few marquee players on a team that was usually barely competitive; he only played on a winning team twice (not counting the strike year of 1981) during his time in Cleveland. He later said that while the Indians had some very good players, management simply couldn't keep them in Cleveland for any period of time.

=== Career stats ===
Thornton was selected as an American League All-Star in 1982 and 1984. He finished his career with 244 doubles, 253 home runs, a batting average of .254, an on-base percentage of .360, and a slugging percentage of .452. For three seasons, he finished in the top five in home runs in his league, and he was in his league's top five in walks four times. Thornton finished his career with more bases on balls (876) than strikeouts (851).

== Personal life ==
In 1977, Thornton and his son Andy (André Jr.) were injured in an automobile accident that took the life of his wife Gertrude and three-year-old daughter Theresa Gertrude. In 1983 he wrote a book, Triumph Born of Tragedy, which is an account of the accident and his Christian faith. In 1979, Thornton married Gail Jones, a singer and former member of The Jones Sisters Trio gospel group. In addition to André Jr., the couple have two other sons, Jonathan and Dean.

In 1979, Thornton received the Roberto Clemente Award, given annually to a Major League Baseball player who demonstrates sportsmanship and community involvement. In 1982, he won the Hutch Award.

Thornton is the CEO of ASW Global, a supply chain management company headquartered in Mogadore, Ohio. After his playing career, he continued to be involved in the Cleveland community, sitting on the boards of the Cleveland Council on World Affairs, the Cleveland Zoological Society, the Cuyahoga Community College Fund and Nyack College; being a member of Leadership Cleveland; and through involvement with The First Tee of Cleveland, a golf program which is geared to provide youth with educational programs and facilities that promote character development.

In August 2007, Thornton was inducted into the Cleveland Indians Hall of Fame along with Jim Bagby Sr., Mike Garcia and Charles Nagy. Thornton is also a member of the minor league Reading Phillies Hall of Fame. The Indians also named Thornton as a member of their "Top 100 Greatest Indians." Andre Thornton Park, on the north side of Phoenixville, Pennsylvania, opened in August 2010.

== See also ==
- List of Major League Baseball career home run leaders
- List of Major League Baseball players to hit for the cycle

Awards and achievements
Preceded by Tony Pérez	National League Player of the Month; September 1975	Succeeded by Mike Schmidt
Preceded by Jack Brohamer	Hitting for the cycle April 22, 1978	Succeeded by Chris Speier
