= Ron Hassey =

American baseball player and coach (born 1953)

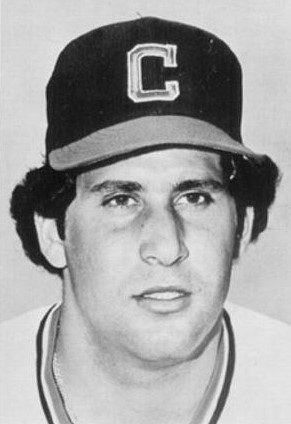
- Catcher
- Born: February 27, 1953 (age 73); Tucson, Arizona, U.S.
- Batted: Left Threw: Right

MLB debut
- April 23, 1978, for the Cleveland Indians

Last MLB appearance
- September 3, 1991, for the Montreal Expos

MLB statistics
- Batting average: .266
- Home runs: 71
- Runs batted in: 438
- Stats at Baseball Reference

Teams
- As player: Cleveland Indians (1978–1984); Chicago Cubs (1984); New York Yankees (1985–1986); Chicago White Sox (1986–1987); Oakland Athletics (1988–1990); Montreal Expos (1991); As coach: Colorado Rockies (1993–1995); St. Louis Cardinals (1996); Seattle Mariners (2005–2006)

Career highlights and awards
- World Series champion (1989)
Medals
Men's baseball
Representing United States
Amateur World Series
Gold medal – first place	1974 St. Petersburg	Team
Pan American Games
Silver medal – second place	1975 Mexico City	Team

Ronald William Hassey (born February 27, 1953) is an American former professional baseball player. He played in Major League Baseball (MLB) as a catcher for the Cleveland Indians (1978–1984), Chicago Cubs (1984), New York Yankees (1985–1986), Chicago White Sox (1986–1987), Oakland Athletics (1988–1990), and Montreal Expos (1991). Hassey is notable for being the only catcher in MLB history to have caught more than one perfect game (his first was with Len Barker in 1981 and his second with Dennis Martínez in 1991). Hassey joined Gus Triandos as the only catchers in MLB history to have caught a no-hitter in both leagues.

== Early life ==
Hassey is the son of Joseph Bill Hassey, a former baseball player in the New York Yankees’ minor-league system. He was born and raised in Tucson, Arizona, and attended Tucson High Magnet School where, in 1972, his team went undefeated and won the state championship. Ron was often referred to as the Pride of Tucson. He went to the University of Arizona, where he was coached by Jerry Kindall. In Hassey's senior year (1976) the Wildcats won their first of three NCAA Championship's under Kindall. Hassey's father also played for Tucson High Magnet School and the University of Arizona.

== Playing career (1976–91) ==
=== Minor leagues ===
Hassey was drafted by the Cleveland Indians in the 18th round of the 1976 amateur draft. He played for the San Jose Bees, the Williamsport Tomahawks, the Toledo Mud Hens, and the Portland Beavers.

=== MLB regular season ===
He made his MLB debut on April 23, 1978, and played his final game on September 3, 1991. He played in 1,192 regular season games, finishing with a .266 batting average, 71 home runs, and 438 runs batted in. He had the highest average among all catchers in the 1980 baseball season with a .318 batting average. On May 15, 1981, Hassey caught starting pitcher Len Barker's perfect game against the Toronto Blue Jays. On June 13, 1984, Hassey was involved in a high-profile trade, when the Cleveland Indians traded him along with Rick Sutcliffe and George Frazier to the Cubs in exchange for Joe Carter, Mel Hall and Don Schulze. After exercising his right to demand a trade because of lack of playing time, he was traded along with Henry Cotto, Rich Bordi and Porfi Altamirano from the Cubs to the Yankees for Ray Fontenot and Brian Dayett at the Winter Meetings on December 4, 1984. While with the Oakland Athletics he was known for almost exclusively catching all of starting pitcher Bob Welch's games, most notably during the 1990 season in which Welch won 27 games and earned the Cy Young Award trophy. On July 28, 1991, he caught Dennis Martínez's perfect game against the Los Angeles Dodgers. He had been catching Martínez exclusively that season with the Expos.

=== MLB postseason ===
Hassey played for the Athletics in three World Series. He was a member of the A's team that lost to the Los Angeles Dodgers in the 1988 World Series, and he was catching Dennis Eckersley during the legendary Kirk Gibson's 1988 World Series home run. He was also a member of the A's team that defeated the San Francisco Giants in the 1989 World Series (though he did not play in the series), and lost to the Cincinnati Reds in the 1990 World Series. In five postseason series, Hassey tallied an impressive career postseason .323 batting average.

== Post-playing career (1992–present) ==
Hassey was a coach for the expansion Colorado Rockies from 1993 to 1995, and for the St. Louis Cardinals in 1996. He then served as a scout for the Arizona Diamondbacks from 1997 to 2003. He managed the Carolina Mudcats in 2004, and in 2005–06 served as a bench coach for the Seattle Mariners under manager Mike Hargrove. Hargrove and Hassey played together for the Cleveland Indians from 1979 to 1984. He spent the 2011 season managing the Miami Marlins' Class A Affiliate, the Jupiter Hammerheads. He spent the 2012–2013 season managing the Miami Marlins' Triple-A Affiliate, the New Orleans Zephyrs. The last game for the New Orleans Zephyrs, Hassey announced he was going to retire from baseball.

== See also ==
- Perfect game
- Dennis Martínez's perfect game
- Len Barker's perfect game
- List of St. Louis Cardinals coaches

Preceded by Don Zimmer	Colorado Rockies Bench Coach; 1994	Succeeded by Don Zimmer
