= 1977 Oakland Athletics season =

1977 Oakland Athletics
- League: American League
- Division: West
- Ballpark: Oakland-Alameda County Coliseum
- City: Oakland, California
- Record: 63–98 (.391)
- Divisional place: 7th
- Owners: Charles O. Finley
- Managers: Jack McKeon, Bobby Winkles
- Television: KPIX-TV
- Radio: KNBR (Monte Moore, Bob Waller)

The 1977 Oakland Athletics season was the 77th season for the Oakland Athletics franchise, all as members of the American League, and their 10th season in Oakland. The team finished seventh in the American League West with a record of 63 wins and 98 losses. Paid attendance for the season was 495,578, one of the worst attendance figures for the franchise during the 1970s.

== Offseason ==
- November 5, 1976: Manager Chuck Tanner was traded by the Oakland Athletics to the Pittsburgh Pirates for Manny Sanguillén.
- November 9, 1976: Billy Williams was released by the Athletics.
- January 9, 1977: Craig Minetto was signed by the Athletics as a free agent.
- February 25, 1977: Ken McMullen was purchased from the Athletics by the Milwaukee Brewers.
- March 15, 1977: Phil Garner, Tommy Helms, and Chris Batton were traded by the Athletics to the Pittsburgh Pirates for Rick Langford, Tony Armas, Doug Bair, Dave Giusti, Doc Medich, and Mitchell Page.
- March 15, 1977: Jim Todd was traded by the Athletics to the Chicago Cubs for Joe Coleman.
- March 15, 1977: Jerry Tabb was purchased by the Athletics from the Chicago Cubs.
- March 15, 1977: Gaylen Pitts was traded by the Athletics to the Chicago Cubs for Jim Tyrone.
- March 16, 1977: Dick Allen was signed as a free agent by the Athletics.

== Regular season ==
After the 1976 season, most of the Athletics' veteran players who had become eligible for free agency left. In 1977, only three years after winning the World Series, the A's finished with the worst record in the American League West, behind even the expansion Seattle Mariners (though by only 1/2 game, as one game with the Minnesota Twins was canceled by weather and never made up).

On June 10, Jack McKeon was fired as manager and replaced by former Arizona State University coach Bobby Winkles.

After the season, owner Charlie Finley attempted to trade Vida Blue to the Cincinnati Reds for a player of lesser stature and cash, but Commissioner Bowie Kuhn vetoed the deal. The commissioner claimed that it was tantamount to the sale of the star pitcher to the New York Yankees that the commissioner voided in 1976. The commissioner claimed that adding Blue to the Reds' already formidable pitching staff would make a mockery of the National League West race. Instead, Blue was traded across the bay to the San Francisco Giants in a multi-player trade that received the Commissioner's blessing.

=== Proposed sale ===
Kuhn and other owners thought that the Athletics relocating would alleviate baseball's problems in the Bay Area regarding poor attendance. Kuhn attempted to get an ownership group to purchase the Athletics and relocate to Washington, D.C., with the intention of moving them to the National League.

=== Season standings ===
AL West
| Team | W | L | Pct. | GB | Home | Road |
|---|---|---|---|---|---|---|
| Kansas City Royals | 102 | 60 | .630 | — | 55‍–‍26 | 47‍–‍34 |
| Texas Rangers | 94 | 68 | .580 | 8 | 44‍–‍37 | 50‍–‍31 |
| Chicago White Sox | 90 | 72 | .556 | 12 | 48‍–‍33 | 42‍–‍39 |
| Minnesota Twins | 84 | 77 | .522 | 17½ | 48‍–‍32 | 36‍–‍45 |
| California Angels | 74 | 88 | .457 | 28 | 39‍–‍42 | 35‍–‍46 |
| Seattle Mariners | 64 | 98 | .395 | 38 | 29‍–‍52 | 35‍–‍46 |
| Oakland Athletics | 63 | 98 | .391 | 38½ | 35‍–‍46 | 28‍–‍52 |

=== Record vs. opponents ===
1977 American League record Sources:
| Team | BAL | BOS | CAL | CWS | CLE | DET | KC | MIL | MIN | NYY | OAK | SEA | TEX | TOR |
|---|---|---|---|---|---|---|---|---|---|---|---|---|---|---|
| Baltimore | — | 6–8 | 5–6 | 5–5 | 11–4 | 12–3 | 4–7 | 11–4 | 6–4 | 8–7 | 8–2 | 7–3 | 4–6 | 10–5 |
| Boston | 8–6 | — | 7–3 | 3–7 | 8–7 | 9–6 | 5–5 | 9–6 | 4–6 | 8–7 | 8–3 | 10–1 | 6–4 | 12–3 |
| California | 6–5 | 3–7 | — | 8–7 | 6–4 | 4–6 | 6–9 | 5–5 | 7–8 | 4–7 | 5–10 | 9–6 | 5–10 | 6–4 |
| Chicago | 5–5 | 7–3 | 7–8 | — | 6–4 | 4–6 | 8–7 | 6–5 | 10–5 | 3–7 | 10–5 | 10–5 | 6–9 | 8–3 |
| Cleveland | 4–11 | 7–8 | 4–6 | 4–6 | — | 8–7 | 3–7 | 11–4 | 2–9 | 3–12 | 7–3 | 7–3 | 2–9 | 9–5 |
| Detroit | 3–12 | 6–9 | 6–4 | 6–4 | 7–8 | — | 3–8 | 10–5 | 5–5 | 6–9 | 5–5 | 5–6 | 2–8 | 10–5 |
| Kansas City | 7–4 | 5–5 | 9–6 | 7–8 | 7–3 | 8–3 | — | 8–2 | 10–5 | 5–5 | 9–6 | 11–4 | 8–7 | 8–2 |
| Milwaukee | 4–11 | 6–9 | 5–5 | 5–6 | 4–11 | 5–10 | 2–8 | — | 3–8 | 8–7 | 5–5 | 7–3 | 5–5 | 8–7 |
| Minnesota | 4–6 | 6–4 | 8–7 | 5–10 | 9–2 | 5–5 | 5–10 | 8–3 | — | 2–8 | 8–6 | 7–8 | 8–7 | 9–1 |
| New York | 7–8 | 7–8 | 7–4 | 7–3 | 12–3 | 9–6 | 5–5 | 7–8 | 8–2 | — | 9–2 | 6–4 | 7–3 | 9–6 |
| Oakland | 2–8 | 3–8 | 10–5 | 5–10 | 3–7 | 5–5 | 6–9 | 5–5 | 6–8 | 2–9 | — | 7–8 | 2–13 | 7–3 |
| Seattle | 3–7 | 1–10 | 6–9 | 5–10 | 3–7 | 6–5 | 4–11 | 3–7 | 8–7 | 4–6 | 8–7 | — | 9–6 | 4–6 |
| Texas | 6–4 | 4–6 | 10–5 | 9–6 | 9–2 | 8–2 | 7–8 | 5–5 | 7–8 | 3–7 | 13–2 | 6–9 | — | 7–4 |
| Toronto | 5–10 | 3–12 | 4–6 | 3–8 | 5–9 | 5–10 | 2–8 | 7–8 | 1–9 | 6–9 | 3–7 | 6–4 | 4–7 | — |

=== Opening Day lineup ===
1. Billy North, CF
2. Rodney Scott, 2B
3. Mitchell Page. LF
4. Dick Allen, 1B
5. Manny Sanguillén, C
6. Wayne Gross, 3B
7. Earl Williams, DH
8. Tony Armas, RF
9. Rob Picciolo, SS
- Mike Torrez, P

=== Notable transactions ===
- April 4, 1977: Sheldon Mallory was purchased by the Athletics from the New York Mets.
- April 27, 1977: Mike Torrez was traded by the Athletics to the New York Yankees for Dock Ellis, Larry Murray and Marty Perez.
- June 7, 1977: Shooty Babitt was drafted by the Athletics in the 25th round of the 1977 Major League Baseball draft.
- June 15, 1977: Dock Ellis was purchased from the Athletics by the Texas Rangers.
- June 15, 1977: Denny Walling was traded by the Athletics to the Houston Astros for Willie Crawford.

=== Roster ===
1977 Oakland Athletics
Roster
| Pitchers: 45 Stan Bahnsen; 17 Doug Bair; 14 Vida Blue; 15 Joe Coleman; 24 Steve Dunning; 36 Dock Ellis; 31 Dave Giusti; 27 Matt Keough; 34 Bob Lacey; 22 Rick Langford; 54 Steve McCatty; 33 Doc Medich; 29 Craig Mitchell; 24 Paul Mitchell; 16 Mike Norris; 28 Pablo Torrealba; 24 Mike Torrez; 30 Jim Umbarger | Catchers: 25 Tim Hosley; 5 Jeff Newman; 35 Manny Sanguillén; 32 Earl Williams; Infielders: 60 Dick Allen; 10 Wayne Gross; 18 Mike Jorgensen; 21 Larry Lintz; 9 Rich McKinney; 7 Marty Perez; 8 Rob Picciolo; 3 Rodney Scott; 12 Jerry Tabb | Outfielders: 2 Matt Alexander; 11 Tony Armas; 99 Willie Crawford; 29 Sheldon Mallory; 20 Larry Murray; 4 Billy North; 6 Mitchell Page; 26 Jim Tyrone; 13 Mark Williams | Manager: 1 Jack McKeon; 1 Bobby Winkles; Coaches: 41 Cal Ermer; -- Bobby Hofman; 43 Red Schoendienst; 42 Lee Stange |

== Player stats ==
| = Indicates team leader |

=== Batting ===
==== Starters by position ====
Note: Pos = Position; G = Games played; AB = At bats; H = Hits; Avg. = Batting average; HR = Home runs; RBI = Runs batted in

| Pos | Player | G | AB | H | Avg. | HR | RBI |
|---|---|---|---|---|---|---|---|
| C | Manny Sanguillén | 152 | 571 | 157 | .275 | 6 | 58 |
| 1B | Dick Allen | 54 | 171 | 41 | .240 | 5 | 31 |
| 2B | Marty Perez | 115 | 373 | 86 | .231 | 2 | 23 |
| 3B | Wayne Gross | 146 | 485 | 113 | .233 | 22 | 63 |
| SS | Rob Picciolo | 148 | 419 | 84 | .200 | 2 | 22 |
| LF | Mitchell Page | 145 | 501 | 154 | .307 | 21 | 75 |
| CF | Tony Armas | 118 | 363 | 87 | .240 | 13 | 53 |
| RF | Jim Tyrone | 96 | 294 | 72 | .245 | 5 | 26 |
| DH | Earl Williams | 100 | 348 | 84 | .241 | 13 | 38 |

==== Other batters ====
Note: G = Games played; AB = At bats; H = Hits; Avg. = Batting average; HR = Home runs; RBI = Runs batted in

| Player | G | AB | H | Avg. | HR | RBI |
|---|---|---|---|---|---|---|
| Rodney Scott | 133 | 364 | 95 | .261 | 0 | 20 |
| Mike Jorgensen | 66 | 203 | 50 | .246 | 8 | 32 |
| Rich McKinney | 86 | 198 | 35 | .177 | 6 | 21 |
| Billy North | 56 | 184 | 48 | .261 | 1 | 9 |
| Larry Murray | 90 | 162 | 29 | .179 | 1 | 9 |
| Jeff Newman | 94 | 162 | 36 | .222 | 4 | 15 |
| Jerry Tabb | 51 | 144 | 32 | .222 | 6 | 19 |
| Willie Crawford | 59 | 136 | 25 | .184 | 1 | 16 |
| Sheldon Mallory | 64 | 126 | 27 | .214 | 0 | 5 |
| Tim Hosley | 39 | 78 | 15 | .192 | 1 | 10 |
| Matt Alexander | 90 | 42 | 10 | .238 | 0 | 2 |
| Larry Lintz | 41 | 30 | 4 | .133 | 0 | 0 |
| Mark Williams | 3 | 2 | 0 | .000 | 0 | 1 |

=== Pitching ===
==== Starting pitchers ====
Note: G = Games pitched; IP = Innings pitched; W = Wins; L = Losses; ERA = Earned run average; SO = Strikeouts

| Player | G | IP | W | L | ERA | SO |
|---|---|---|---|---|---|---|
| Vida Blue | 38 | 279.2 | 14 | 19 | 3.83 | 157 |
| Rick Langford | 37 | 208.1 | 8 | 19 | 4.02 | 141 |
| Doc Medich | 26 | 147.2 | 10 | 6 | 4.69 | 74 |
| Mike Norris | 16 | 77.1 | 2 | 7 | 4.77 | 35 |
| Matt Keough | 7 | 42.2 | 1 | 3 | 4.85 | 23 |
| Dock Ellis | 7 | 26.0 | 1 | 5 | 9.69 | 11 |
| Mike Torrez | 4 | 26.1 | 3 | 1 | 4.44 | 12 |

==== Other pitchers ====
Note: G = Games pitched; IP = Innings pitched; W = Wins; L = Losses; ERA = Earned run average; SO = Strikeouts

| Player | G | IP | W | L | ERA | SO |
|---|---|---|---|---|---|---|
| Joe Coleman | 43 | 127.2 | 4 | 4 | 2.96 | 55 |
| Pablo Torrealba | 41 | 116.2 | 4 | 6 | 2.62 | 51 |
| Jim Umbarger | 12 | 44.0 | 1 | 5 | 6.55 | 24 |
| Stan Bahnsen | 11 | 22.0 | 1 | 2 | 6.14 | 21 |
| Paul Mitchell | 5 | 13.2 | 0 | 3 | 10.54 | 5 |
| Steve McCatty | 4 | 14.1 | 0 | 0 | 5.02 | 9 |
| Craig Mitchell | 3 | 5.2 | 0 | 1 | 7.94 | 1 |

==== Relief pitchers ====
Note: G = Games pitched; W = Wins; L = Losses; SV = Saves; ERA = Earned run average; SO = Strikeouts

| Player | G | W | L | SV | ERA | SO |
|---|---|---|---|---|---|---|
| Doug Bair | 45 | 4 | 6 | 8 | 3.46 | 68 |
| Bob Lacey | 64 | 6 | 8 | 7 | 3.03 | 69 |
| Dave Giusti | 40 | 3 | 3 | 6 | 2.98 | 28 |
| Steve Dunning | 6 | 1 | 0 | 0 | 3.93 | 4 |
| Jeff Newman | 1 | 0 | 0 | 0 | 0.00 | 0 |

== Awards and honors ==
=== All-Stars ===
- Vida Blue, reserve
- Wayne Gross, reserve

== Farm system ==
| Level | Team | League | Manager |
|---|---|---|---|
| AAA | San Jose Missions | Pacific Coast League | Rene Lachemann |
| AA | Chattanooga Lookouts | Southern League | George Farson |
| A | Modesto A's | California League | Tom Trebelhorn |
| Rookie | Medicine Hat A's | Pioneer League | Orlando Gómez |
