= 1976 Oakland Athletics season =

1976 Oakland Athletics
- League: American League
- Division: West
- Ballpark: Oakland–Alameda County Coliseum
- City: Oakland, California
- Record: 87–74 (.540)
- Divisional place: 2nd
- Owners: Charles O. Finley
- Managers: Chuck Tanner
- Television: KPIX-TV
- Radio: KNBR (Monte Moore, Bob Waller)

The 1976 Oakland Athletics season was the 76th season for the Oakland Athletics franchise, all as members of the American League, and their 9th season in Oakland. The Athletics finished second in the American League West with a record of 87 wins and 74 losses, 2 1/2 games behind the Kansas City Royals. The A's failed to win the division (and make the playoffs) for the first time since 1970. The team set and still holds the American League record for most stolen bases with 341, second in Major League Baseball's modern era (since 1901) to the 1911 New York Giants, who had 347.

The Athletics did not eclipse this season's win total until 1988 (104 wins). Nearly all of the team's stars (Sal Bando, Rollie Fingers, Gene Tenace, Joe Rudi, Bert Campaneris, Don Baylor, Phil Garner, Billy Williams, Claudell Washington, and an injury-plagued Willie McCovey) departed after this season. This staggering mass exodus led to a 24-win plunge in 1977 to last place in the standings and attendance.

== Offseason ==
- October 10, 1975: Dal Maxvill was released.
- December 9, 1975: Ray Fosse was purchased by the Cleveland Indians.
- April 2, 1976: Reggie Jackson, Ken Holtzman, and Bill Van Bommell (minors) were traded to the Baltimore Orioles for Don Baylor, Mike Torrez, and Paul Mitchell. Owner Charlie Finley stated that he made the trade to obtain more pitching for the club. He later admitted that he had refused to agree to Jackson's salary demands.
- April 5, 1976: Ken McMullen was signed as a free agent.

== Regular season ==
As the 1976 season got underway (on April 9 for Oakland), the basic rules of player contracts were changing. It was ruled that baseball's reserve clause only bound players for one season after their contract expired. All players not signed to multi-year contracts would be eligible for free agency at the end of the 1976 season. Finley reacted by trading star players and attempting to sell others. On June 15, Finley sold left fielder Joe Rudi and relief pitcher Rollie Fingers to the Boston Red Sox for $1 million each, and pitcher Vida Blue to the New York Yankees for $1.5 million. Three days later, Bowie Kuhn voided the transactions in the "best interests of baseball." Amid the turmoil, the A's still finished second in the A.L. West, 2.5 games behind the Royals.

=== Fire sale ===
- Before the June 15 trading deadline, Finley contacted the New York Yankees and the Boston Red Sox. He had proposed a trade to the Red Sox that would have involved Joe Rudi, Rollie Fingers, Vida Blue, Gene Tenace, and Sal Bando for outfielder Fred Lynn, catcher Carlton Fisk, and prospects. In trade talks with the Yankees, Finley proposed Vida Blue for catcher Thurman Munson, along with either outfielder Roy White or Elliott Maddox; he also offered Rudi for Munson.
- On June 14, Finley was unable to make any trades, and had started contacting other teams about the possibility of selling his players' contracts. Rudi, Blue, Baylor, and Tenace were worth $1 million each, while Bando could be acquired for $500,000. Boston general manager Dick O'Connell was in Oakland as the Red Sox would play the Athletics on June 15. Field manager Darrell Johnson had declared that he was interested in Rudi and Fingers; the Red Sox had agreed to purchase both contracts for one million dollars each.

O'Connell had contacted Detroit Tigers general manager Jim Campbell to purchase Vida Blue for one million dollars so that the New York Yankees could not get him. Gabe Paul of the Yankees advised that he would pay $1.5 million for the opportunity to acquire Blue. Finley offered Blue a three-year extension worth $485,000 per season to make the sale more attractive to the Yankees. With the extension, the Yankees agreed to purchase Blue.

- Finley had then proceeded to contact Bill Veeck of the Chicago White Sox about purchasing Sal Bando. He then contacted the Texas Rangers, as they were interested in acquiring Don Baylor for the one million dollar asking price.

=== Season standings ===
AL West
Team	W	L	Pct.	GB	Home	Road
Kansas City Royals	90	72	.556	—	49‍–‍32	41‍–‍40
Oakland Athletics	87	74	.540	2½	51‍–‍30	36‍–‍44
Minnesota Twins	85	77	.525	5	44‍–‍37	41‍–‍40
Texas Rangers	76	86	.469	14	39‍–‍42	37‍–‍44
California Angels	76	86	.469	14	38‍–‍43	38‍–‍43
Chicago White Sox	64	97	.398	25½	35‍–‍45	29‍–‍52

- By May 18, the Athletics were 18–24 (.429), and seven and a half games out of first place.

=== Record vs. opponents ===
1976 American League record Sources:
Team	BAL	BOS	CAL	CWS	CLE	DET	KC	MIL	MIN	NYY	OAK	TEX
Baltimore	—	7–11	8–4	8–4	7–11	12–6	6–6	11–7	4–8	13–5	4–8	8–4
Boston	11–7	—	7–5	6–6	9–9	14–4	3–9	12–6	7–5	7–11	4–8	3–9
California	4–8	5–7	—	11–7	7–5	6–6	8–10	4–8	8–10	5–7	6–12	12–6
Chicago	4–8	6–6	7–11	—	3–9	6–6	8–10	7–5	7–11	1–11	8–9	7–11
Cleveland	11–7	9–9	5–7	9–3	—	6–12	6–6	11–6	9–3	4–12	4–8	7–5
Detroit	6–12	4–14	6–6	6–6	12–6	—	4–8	12–6	4–8	9–8	6–6	5–7
Kansas City	6–6	9–3	10–8	10–8	6–6	8–4	—	8–4	10–8	7–5	9–9	7–11
Milwaukee	7–11	6–12	8–4	5–7	6–11	6–12	4–8	—	4–8	5–13	5–7	10–2
Minnesota	8–4	5–7	10–8	11–7	3–9	8–4	8–10	8–4	—	2–10	11–7	11–7
New York	5–13	11–7	7–5	11–1	12–4	8–9	5–7	13–5	10–2	—	6–6	9–3
Oakland	8–4	8–4	12–6	9–8	8–4	6–6	9–9	7–5	7–11	6–6	—	7–11
Texas	4–8	9–3	6–12	11–7	5–7	7–5	11–7	2–10	7–11	3–9	11–7	—

=== Notable transactions ===
- April 19: Tim Hosley was selected off waivers from the Chicago Cubs.
- June 8: 1976 Major League Baseball draft
  - Rickey Henderson was drafted in the fourth round, and signed on July 9, 1976.
  - Ernie Camacho was drafted in the first round (18th pick) of the Secondary Phase.
- June 9: Nate Colbert was signed as a free agent.
- August 30: Willie McCovey was purchased from the San Diego Padres.

=== Roster ===
1976 Oakland Athletics
Roster
Pitchers: 37 Glenn Abbott; 39,45 Stan Bahnsen; 32 Chris Batton; 14 Vida Blue; 17 Dick Bosman; 34 Rollie Fingers; 25 Paul Lindblad; 29 Craig Mitchell; 36 Paul Mitchell; 16 Mike Norris; 22 Jim Todd; 24 Mike Torrez	Catchers: 12 Larry Haney; 30 Tim Hosley; 5 Jeff Newman; Infielders: 6 Sal Bando; 19 Bert Campaneris; 11 Ron Fairly; 2,3 Phil Garner; 10 Wayne Gross; 21,45 Larry Lintz; 35 Ken McMullen; 13 Tommy Sandt; 18 Gene Tenace	Outfielders: 31 Matt Alexander; 20 Don Baylor; 8 Ángel Mangual; 4 Billy North; 26 Joe Rudi; 2,3 César Tovar; 8 Denny Walling; 15 Claudell Washington; 28 Billy Williams; 33 Gary Woods; Other batters: 23 Nate Colbert; 38 Jim Holt; 1 Don Hopkins; 44 Willie McCovey	Manager: 7 Chuck Tanner; Coaches: 44 Joe Lonnett; 43 Alex Monchak; 42 Wes Stock

== Player stats ==
=== Batting ===
==== Starters by position ====
Note: Pos = Position; G = Games played; AB = At bats; H = Hits; Avg. = Batting average; HR = Home runs; RBI = Runs batted in

Pos	Player	G	AB	H	Avg.	HR	RBI
C	Larry Haney	88	177	40	.226	0	10
1B	Gene Tenace	128	417	104	.249	22	66
2B	Phil Garner	159	555	145	.261	8	74
3B	Sal Bando	158	550	132	.240	27	84
SS	Bert Campaneris	149	536	137	.256	1	52
LF	Joe Rudi	130	500	135	.270	13	94
CF	Billy North	154	590	163	.276	2	31
RF	Claudell Washington	134	490	126	.257	5	53
DH	Billy Williams	120	351	74	.211	11	41

==== Other batters ====
Note: G = Games played; AB = At bats; H = Hits; Avg. = Batting average; HR = Home runs; RBI = Runs batted in

Player	G	AB	H	Avg.	HR	RBI
Don Baylor	157	595	147	.247	15	68
Ken McMullen	98	186	41	.220	5	23
Jeff Newman	43	77	15	.195	0	4
Tommy Sandt	41	67	14	.209	0	3
Tim Hosley	37	55	9	.164	1	4
Ron Fairly	15	46	11	.239	3	10
César Tovar	29	45	8	.178	0	4
Matt Alexander	61	30	1	.033	0	0
Willie McCovey	11	24	5	.208	0	0
Wayne Gross	10	18	4	.222	0	1
Ángel Mangual	8	12	2	.167	0	1
Denny Walling	3	11	3	.273	0	0
Gary Woods	6	8	1	.125	0	0
Jim Holt	4	7	2	.286	0	2
Nate Colbert	2	5	0	.000	0	0
Larry Lintz	68	1	0	.000	0	0
Don Hopkins	3	0	0	----	0	0

=== Pitching ===
==== Starting pitchers ====
Note: G = Games pitched; IP = Innings pitched; W = Wins; L = Losses; ERA = Earned run average; SO = Strikeouts

Player	G	IP	W	L	ERA	SO
Vida Blue	37	298.1	18	13	2.35	166
Mike Torrez	39	266.1	16	12	2.50	115
Paul Mitchell	26	142.0	9	7	4.25	67
Mike Norris	24	96.0	4	5	4.78	44

==== Other pitchers ====
Note: G = Games pitched; IP = Innings pitched; W = Wins; L = Losses; ERA = Earned run average; SO = Strikeouts

Player	G	IP	W	L	ERA	SO
Stan Bahnsen	35	143.0	8	7	3.34	82
Dick Bosman	27	112.0	4	2	4.10	34
Glenn Abbott	19	62.1	2	4	5.49	27
Chris Batton	2	4.0	0	0	9.00	4

==== Relief pitchers ====
Note: G = Games pitched; W = Wins; L = Losses; SV = Saves; ERA = Earned run average; SO = Strikeouts

Player	G	W	L	SV	ERA	SO
Rollie Fingers	70	13	11	20	2.47	113
Paul Lindblad	65	6	5	5	3.06	37
Jim Todd	49	7	8	4	3.81	22
Craig Mitchell	1	0	0	0	2.70	0

== Farm system ==
Level	Team	League	Manager
AAA	Tucson Toros	Pacific Coast League	Hank Aguirre and Lee Stange
AA	Chattanooga Lookouts	Southern League	Rene Lachemann
A	Modesto A's	California League	George Farson
A-Short Season	Boise A's	Northwest League	Tom Trebelhorn
