= 1980 Oakland Athletics season =

1980 Oakland Athletics
- League: American League
- Division: West
- Ballpark: Oakland-Alameda County Coliseum
- City: Oakland, California
- Record: 83–79 (.512)
- Divisional place: 2nd
- Owners: Charles O. Finley
- Managers: Billy Martin
- Television: KPIX-TV (Monte Moore, Wayne Walker)
- Radio: KDIA (Ted Robinson, Red Rush, Dom Valentino)

The 1980 Oakland Athletics season was the team's thirteenth season in Oakland. The A's, under first-year manager Billy Martin, began the season with low expectations following their 1979 campaign. Strong performances from pitchers Mike Norris, Matt Keough, and Rick Langford, along with the brilliant play of breakout star (and future Hall-of-Famer) Rickey Henderson, paved the way for a staggering 29-win increase over the previous year's output. The Athletics, only one year removed from baseball's worst record, swung to a second-place finish behind their 83–79 record.

The season also marked the end of the Charlie Finley ownership era. Finley sold the team to Walter A. Haas, Jr. shortly before the start of the 1981 season. The A's would remain under Haas' ownership until 1995.

== Offseason ==
- March 21, 1980: Jim Todd was released by the Athletics.
- March 21, 1980: Joe Wallis was released by the Athletics.

== Regular season ==
In 1980, Charlie O. Finley hired Billy Martin to manage the young team. The club was led by new young stars Rickey Henderson, Mike Norris, Tony Armas, and Dwayne Murphy. The starting pitching staff was also notable in that they completed 94 starts, virtually unheard of in the era of the relief pitcher. Rick Langford finished 28 of his 33 starts, totalling 290 innings, and tallying a 19-12 record. Norris went 22-9 with a 2.53 ERA, completed 24 starts, and was runner-up to Steve Stone in the Cy Young Award balloting that year. Martin made believers of his young charges as "Billyball" (characterized as featuring aggressive base running) was used to market the team, and the Athletics finished second in 1980.

Rickey Henderson broke Ty Cobb's American League record for most stolen bases in one season (96) by recording 100 stolen bases.

=== Season standings ===
AL West
Team	W	L	Pct.	GB	Home	Road
Kansas City Royals	97	65	.599	—	49‍–‍32	48‍–‍33
Oakland Athletics	83	79	.512	14	46‍–‍35	37‍–‍44
Minnesota Twins	77	84	.478	19½	44‍–‍36	33‍–‍48
Texas Rangers	76	85	.472	20½	39‍–‍41	37‍–‍44
Chicago White Sox	70	90	.438	26	37‍–‍42	33‍–‍48
California Angels	65	95	.406	31	30‍–‍51	35‍–‍44
Seattle Mariners	59	103	.364	38	36‍–‍45	23‍–‍58

=== Record vs. opponents ===
1980 American League record Sources:
Team	BAL	BOS	CAL	CWS	CLE	DET	KC	MIL	MIN	NYY	OAK	SEA	TEX	TOR
Baltimore	—	8–5	10–2	6–6	6–7	10–3	6–6	7–6	10–2	7–6	7–5	6–6	6–6	11–2
Boston	5–8	—	9–3	6–4	7–6	8–5	5–7	6–7	6–6	3–10	9–3	7–5	5–7	7–6
California	2–10	3–9	—	3–10	4–6	5–7	5–8	6–6	7–6	2–10	3–10	11–2	11–2	3–9
Chicago	6–6	4–6	10–3	—	5–7	2–10	5–8	5–7	5–8	5–7	6–7	6–7	6–7–2	5–7
Cleveland	7–6	6–7	6–4	7–5	—	3–10	5–7	3–10	9–3	5–8	6–6	8–4	6–6	8–5
Detroit	3–10	5–8	7–5	10–2	10–3	—	2–10	7–6	6–6	5–8	6–6	10–2–1	4–8	9–4
Kansas City	6–6	7–5	8–5	8–5	7–5	10–2	—	6–6	5–8	8–4	6–7	7–6	10–3	9–3
Milwaukee	6–7	7–6	6–6	7–5	10–3	6–7	6–6	—	7–5	5–8	7–5	9–3	5–7	5–8
Minnesota	2–10	6–6	6–7	8–5	3–9	6–6	8–5	5–7	—	4–8	6–7	7–6	9–3	7–5
New York	6–7	10–3	10–2	7–5	8–5	8–5	4–8	8–5	8–4	—	8–4	9–3	7–5	10–3
Oakland	5–7	3–9	10–3	7–6	6–6	6–6	7–6	5–7	7–6	4–8	—	8–5	7–6	8–4
Seattle	6–6	5–7	2–11	7–6	4–8	2–10–1	6–7	3–9	6–7	3–9	5–8	—	4–9	6–6
Texas	6–6	7–5	2–11	7–6–2	6–6	8–4	3–10	7–5	3–9	5–7	6–7	9–4	—	7–5
Toronto	2–11	6–7	9–3	7–5	5–8	4–9	3–9	8–5	5–7	3–10	4–8	6–6	5–7	—

=== Notable transactions ===
- April 10, 1980: Randy Elliott was signed as a free agent by the Athletics.

==== Draft picks ====
- June 3, 1980: Rich Bordi was drafted by the Athletics in the 3rd round of the 1980 Major League Baseball draft.

=== Roster ===
1980 Oakland Athletics
Roster
Pitchers: 59 Dave Beard; 28 Rich Bordi; 52 Ernie Camacho; 33 Dave Hamilton; 38 Jeff Jones; 27 Matt Keough; 50 Brian Kingman; 34 Bob Lacey; 22 Rick Langford; 29 Rick Lysander; 54 Steve McCatty; 32 Craig Minetto; 17 Mike Norris; 58 Mark Souza; 38 Alan Wirth	Catchers: 18 Jim Essian; 48 Mike Heath; Infielders: 19 Jeff Cox; 7 Mike Edwards; 4 Orlando González; 10 Wayne Gross; 3 Mario Guerrero; 12 Mickey Klutts; 39 Dave McKay; 5 Jeff Newman; 8 Rob Picciolo; 13 Dave Revering	Outfielders: 11 Tony Armas; 16 Mike Davis; 35 Rickey Henderson; 21 Dwayne Murphy; Other batters: 45 Ray Cosey; 4 Randy Elliott; 6 Mitchell Page	Manager: 1 Billy Martin; Coaches: 41 Clete Boyer; 42 Art Fowler; 44 George Mitterwald; 43 Lee Walls

== Player stats ==
= Indicates team leader

= Indicates league leader

=== Batting ===
==== Starters by position ====
Note: Pos = Position; G = Games played; AB = At bats; H = Hits; Avg. = Batting average; HR = Home runs; RBI = Runs batted in; SB = Stolen bases

Pos.	Player	G	AB	H	Avg.	HR	RBI	SB
C	Jim Essian	87	285	66	.232	5	29	1
1B	Dave Revering	106	376	109	.290	15	62	1
2B	Jeff Cox	59	169	36	.213	0	9	8
SS	Mario Guerrero	116	381	91	.239	2	23	3
3B	Wayne Gross	113	366	103	.281	14	61	5
LF	Rickey Henderson	158	591	179	.303	9	53	100
CF	Dwayne Murphy	159	573	157	.274	13	68	26
RF	Tony Armas	158	628	175	.279	35	109	5
DH	Mitchell Page	110	348	85	.244	17	51	14

==== Other batters ====
Note: G = Games played; AB = At bats; H = Hits; Avg. = Batting average; HR = Home runs; RBI = Runs batted in

Player	G	AB	H	Avg.	HR	RBI
Jeff Newman	127	438	102	.233	15	56
Mike Heath	92	305	74	.243	1	33
Dave McKay	123	295	72	.244	1	29
Rob Picciolo	95	271	65	.240	5	18
Mickey Klutts	75	197	53	.269	4	21
Mike Davis	51	95	20	.211	1	8
Orlando González	25	70	17	.243	0	1
Mike Edwards	46	59	14	.237	0	3
Randy Elliott	14	39	5	.128	0	1
Ray Cosey	9	9	1	.111	0	0

=== Pitching ===
==== Starting pitchers ====
Note: G = Games pitched; IP = Innings pitched; W = Wins; L = Losses; ERA = Earned run average; SO = Strikeouts

Player	G	IP	W	L	ERA	SO
Rick Langford	35	290.0	19	12	3.26	102
Mike Norris	33	284.1	22	9	2.53	180
Matt Keough	34	250.0	16	13	2.92	121
Steve McCatty	33	221.2	14	14	3.86	114
Brian Kingman	32	211.1	8	20	3.83	116

==== Other pitchers ====
Note: G = Games pitched; IP = Innings pitched; W = Wins; L = Losses; ERA = Earned run average; SO = Strikeouts

Player	G	IP	W	L	ERA	SO
Craig Minetto	7	8.0	0	2	7.88	5

==== Relief pitchers ====
Note: G = Games pitched; W = Wins; L = Losses; SV = Saves; ERA = Earned run average; SO = Strikeouts

Player	G	W	L	SV	ERA	SO
Bob Lacey	47	3	2	6	2.94	45
Jeff Jones	35	1	3	5	2.84	34
Dave Hamilton	21	0	3	0	11.40	23
Dave Beard	13	0	1	1	3.38	12
Ernie Camacho	5	0	0	0	6.94	9
Rick Lysander	5	0	0	0	7.90	5
Mark Souza	5	0	0	0	7.71	2
Alan Wirth	2	0	0	0	4.50	1
Rich Bordi	1	0	0	0	4.50	0

== Awards and honors ==
- Billy Martin, Associated Press AL Manager of the Year

=== League records ===
- Rickey Henderson, American League record (since broken), Most stolen bases in one season (100)

=== League leaders ===
- Rickey Henderson, American League leader, stolen bases (100)

== Farm system ==
Level	Team	League	Manager
AAA	Ogden A's	Pacific Coast League	José Pagán
AA	West Haven Whitecaps	Eastern League	Ed Nottle
A	Modesto A's	California League	Keith Lieppman
A-Short Season	Medford A's	Northwest League	Brad Fischer
