= Herb Washington =

American sprinter, baseball player and businessman (born 1951)

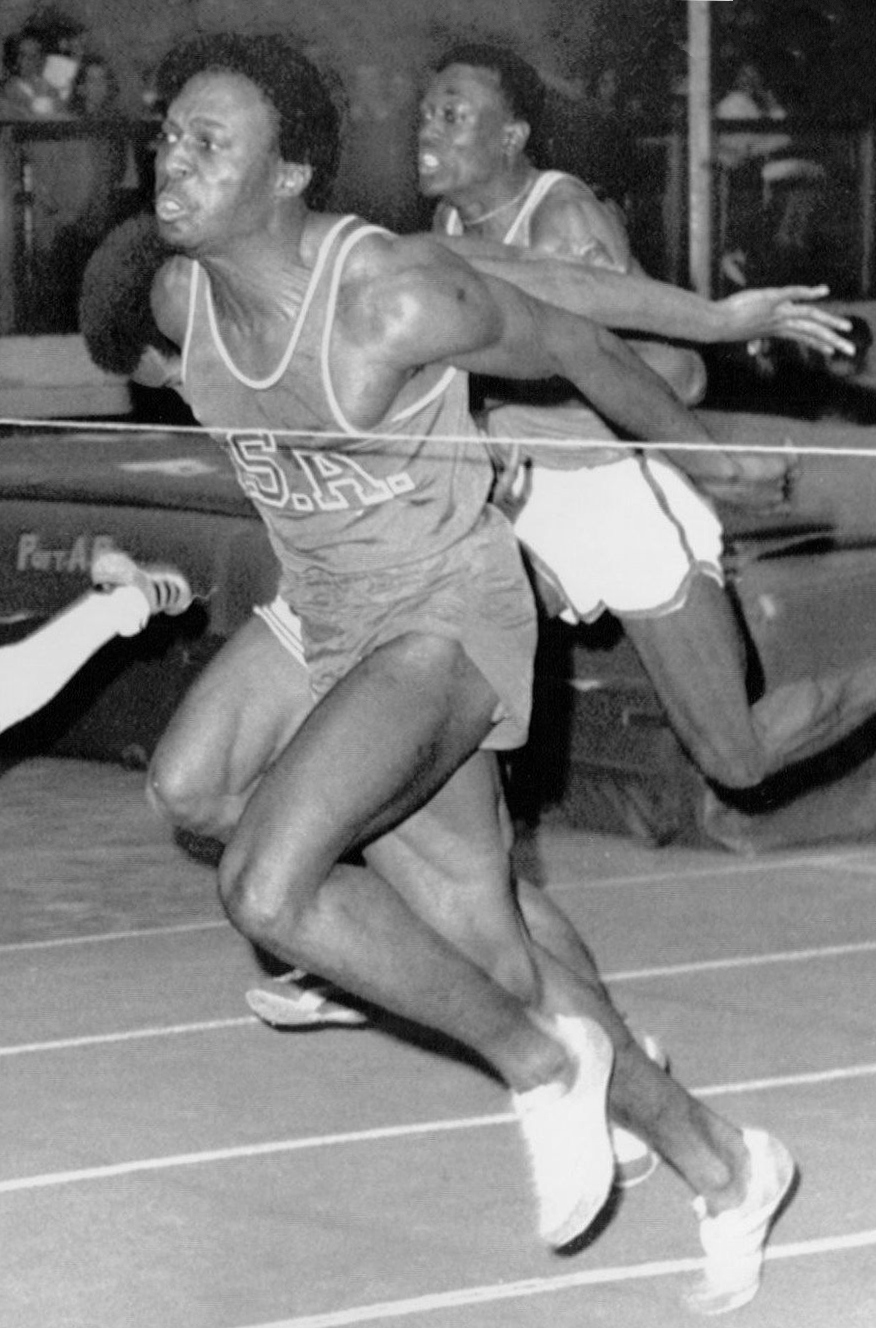
- Washington in 1974
- Pinch runner
- Born: November 16, 1951 (age 74); Belzoni, Mississippi, U.S.
- Batted: Right Threw: Right

MLB debut
- April 4, 1974, for the Oakland Athletics

Last MLB appearance
- May 4, 1975, for the Oakland Athletics

MLB statistics
- Games played: 105
- At bats: 0
- Runs: 33
- Stolen bases: 31
- Stats at Baseball Reference

Teams
- Oakland Athletics (1974–1975)

Career highlights and awards
- World Series champion (1974)

Herbert Lee Washington (born November 16, 1951) is an American world-class sprinter who parlayed his speed into a brief Major League Baseball (MLB) stint in 1974 and 1975 with the Oakland Athletics.

He was replaced in 1975 when the Athletics acquired a baserunning specialist who was also a position player. Washington returned to professional track, then became the owner/operator of numerous McDonald's restaurants and a minor league professional hockey franchise. He has held a number of executive posts on varied boards and organizations, including having served on the board of directors for the Federal Reserve Bank of New York.

== Early life ==
Washington was born in Belzoni, Mississippi, and his family moved to Flint, Michigan, when Washington was an infant. His parents worked in the automotive industry. Washington attended Flint Northern High School until 10th grade, when it was discovered that he lived outside of the school's boundaries. Losing a semester of athletic eligibility, Washington was forced to transfer to a rival school, Flint Central High School. There he ran the 100-yard dash in 9.4 seconds, attracting numerous college scholarship offers. Washington chose Michigan State University because he knew that there were a number of black athletes at the school.

At Michigan State, the four-time all-American won one National Collegiate Athletic Association (NCAA) title, won seven Big Ten titles, and tied or broke the world record in the 50- and 60-yard dashes several times.

Washington was selected in the 13th round in the 1972 NFL draft by the Baltimore Colts, but did not play for them; he informed the team that he was committed to competing in the Big Ten Conference meet, in addition to attempting to make the US Olympic track team for the 1972 Summer Olympics; at the time, amateur status was a much stricter requirement.

== Track career ==
During the 1972 indoor season, he tied Kirk Clayton's two-year-old hand-timed world record in the 50-yard dash of 5.0 at a meet in Toronto, which Mel Pender also tied twice a month later. The following week, he set the 60-yard dash record outright, stopping the clock at 5.8 at a home meet in East Lansing. Neither record has been surpassed as of 2019, as races run in yards are rare, with records for these having been discontinued in 1976, and hand times ceased to be accepted from 1977. A few years later, Washington said that his biggest disappointment had been not qualifying for the 1972 Summer Olympics.

Washington was on the cover of the February 1972 issue of Track and Field News. In 1973, Washington again tied the 50-yard record at the same meet in Toronto. Later that summer, Washington won the international Pacific Conference Games 100 metres which was also in Toronto.

== Pro baseball career ==
In 1974, Washington was tapped by Oakland A's owner Charlie Finley to become the team's "designated runner". Finley and Washington worked out a one-year $45,000 contract with a $20,000 signing bonus. The contract had an unusual clause requiring Washington to grow facial hair before the beginning of the season. Washington had difficulty growing a full mustache, so he used an eyebrow pencil to simulate full facial hair. He was also paid $22,219 as his share of the 1974 World Series, making him the highest paid player in baseball history to never swing a bat or throw a pitch.

Despite having no professional baseball experience, and having last played baseball in high school, Washington was a member of the Athletics 1974 World Series championship team. Finley announced that he would utilize Washington as a "designated runner" and that he did not expect Washington to develop other baseball skills. Washington received coaching on baserunning from Maury Wills. Though Washington's teammates recognized his speed, he received a mixed reception from them because of his unusual background. Reggie Jackson said, "He's a great athlete, but he's not a baseball player." Pitcher Rollie Fingers said that he thought the idea was "a little crazy" but that Washington "could run like crazy". Bert Campaneris said that the team could count on Washington to steal a base when needed.

Before the 1974 World Series, team captain Sal Bando said that he did not think Washington should be used in the World Series, noting that Washington might not have a second chance to make up for any mistakes committed during the series. Appearing as a pinch runner for Joe Rudi in Game 2 of the series, Washington was picked off first base in a crucial ninth-inning situation by Dodgers reliever Mike Marshall.

Early in the 1975 season, Washington was released. Before the season, the Athletics had acquired Don Hopkins, a pinch running specialist who could also play in the outfield. Oakland also acquired a second pinch running specialist, Matt Alexander, just before Washington's release.

Washington played in 105 MLB games without batting, pitching, or fielding, playing exclusively as a pinch runner. He had 31 stolen bases in 48 attempts and scored 33 runs during his short career. Washington is one of only seven position players to have more game appearances than plate appearances.

Washington's 1975 Topps baseball card is the only baseball card ever released that uses the "pinch runner" position label.

== Business career ==
Following his 13-month stint as the only "designated runner" in MLB history, Washington joined the professional track and field circuit and remained in competition until 1976. He worked for Michigan Bell as an assistant director of personnel.

In 1980, he moved from Detroit to Rochester, New York, where he opened an inner-city McDonald's restaurant. He added his second local McDonald's franchise seven months later, and in 1986 he opened a McDonald's in suburban Pittsford, New York. He acquired a total of five Rochester-area McDonald's franchises. Washington's restaurant enterprise, HLW Fast Track Inc., owned 21 McDonald's franchises in Ohio and Pennsylvania by 2009; at that time, it was the largest McDonald's franchisee owned by an African-American. In 2021, Washington held a press conference to announce he was suing McDonald's for systemic racial discrimination. At the time of the lawsuit, Washington owned 14 franchises, down from his high of 27 franchises. Washington alleged that he was being discriminated due to having him operate restaurants with low-volume sales to go with unfair grading. The two sides announced a settlement of the lawsuit on December 16, in which McDonalds purchased 13 restaurants for $33.5 million in exchange for Washington exiting the McDonalds system and dismissing the lawsuit.

Washington was co-chairman of the Small Business Committee of the United Way, and was active in the Urban League of Rochester. Washington was named to the New York State Athletic Commission in 1990. In 1992, he became the chairman of the board of directors of the Buffalo, New York, branch of the Federal Reserve Bank of New York, and later was named Director of the Federal Reserve Bank of New York.

In 2005, he founded the Youngstown SteelHounds minor league hockey franchise in the Central Hockey League (CHL). The SteelHounds were removed from the CHL in 2008 for non-payment of league dues. Washington said that he had paid the league's expansion team fees but that he owed some money, which he was withholding because the league did not reimburse him for some travel expenses. The International Hockey League (IHL) expressed some interest in picking up the Youngstown team, but the league dropped the idea after no serious meetings were held between the team and the IHL.

== Personal ==
Washington married Gisele Gibbs, who also attended Michigan State University, in 1980, and the couple had two children, Terrell and Arielle, both of whom also attended MSU. Washington's son Terrell ran track in college, and as of 2012, he was the general manager of his father's McDonald's franchising company.

== See also ==
- List of baseball players who went directly to Major League Baseball
