= Randy Elliott =

American baseball player (born 1951)

- Outfielder
- Born: June 5, 1951 (age 75); Oxnard, California, U.S.
- Batted: Right Threw: Right

MLB debut
- September 10, 1972, for the San Diego Padres

Last MLB appearance
- June 28, 1980, for the Oakland Athletics

MLB statistics
- Batting average: .215
- Home runs: 8
- Runs batted in: 35
- Stats at Baseball Reference

Teams
- San Diego Padres (1972, 1974); San Francisco Giants (1977); Oakland Athletics (1980)

Randy Lee Elliott (born June 5, 1951) is an American former professional baseball outfielder. He played in 114 games over parts of four seasons in Major League Baseball spread out over nine years for the San Diego Padres (1972 and 1974), San Francisco Giants (1977) and Oakland Athletics (1980). The native of Oxnard, California, threw and batted right-handed, stood 6 feet 2 inches (1.88 m) tall and weighed 190 pounds (86 kg).

Elliott became the first, first-round selection in the June amateur draft in Padres' franchise history when he was selected 24th overall during the club's inaugural season, upon graduation from Adolfo Camarillo High School. In 1972, his fourth year in the Padre farm system, Elliott led the Double-A Texas League in hitting (.335) and runs batted in (85), playing for manager and Hall of Fame outfielder Duke Snider. He was the league's Most Valuable Player and led his club, the Alexandria Aces, to the division title. In September, he was called up by San Diego and recorded ten hits, including three doubles and a triple, in 49 at bats. He then batted only .212 in his second stint with the Padres during another late-season call-up two years later.

Hampered by a severe and chronic shoulder injury, Elliott drew unconditional releases from both the Padres' and the California Angels' organizations during 1976, and signed with the Giants late in the year. A torrid spring training led to his only full year in MLB, as a member of the 1977 Giants. Elliott was the club's fifth outfielder, appearing in 47 games in the field and starting 35 of them in left field. All told, he appeared in 70 contests, a personal best, and also reached career highs in hits (40), home runs (seven), runs batted in (26) and batting average (.240). He sat out the 1978 and 1979 seasons before getting a final audition with the 1980 Athletics. In a 14-game stint in May and June 1980, he batted only .128. He left pro baseball after the 1980 season.

In all, he collected 62 hits in 288 MLB at bats (.215), with 12 doubles, two triples, eight homers and 35 career RBI.
