= Marcos Armas =

Venezuelan baseball player (born 1969)

- First baseman
- Born: August 5, 1969 (age 57); Puerto Píritu, Anzoátegui State, Venezuela
- Batted: Right Threw: Right

MLB debut
- May 25, 1993, for the Oakland Athletics

Last MLB appearance
- September 23, 1993, for the Oakland Athletics

MLB statistics
- Batting average: .194
- Home runs: 1
- Runs batted in: 1
- Stats at Baseball Reference

Teams
- Oakland Athletics (1993)

Marcos Rafael Armas Ruiz (born August 5, 1969) is a Venezuelan former professional baseball first baseman.

== Career ==
He played in Major League Baseball (MLB) for the Oakland Athletics during the 1993 season. He was listed at 6 ft 5 in (1.96 m) and 190 pounds (86 kg).

In one season with Oakland, Armas batted .194 (6-for-31), with one home run, two doubles, seven runs, and one run batted in in 15 games.

== Personal life ==
He is the half-brother of former outfielder Tony Armas and uncle of pitcher Tony Armas Jr.

== See also ==
- List of players from Venezuela in Major League Baseball
