= Pinch runner =

Substitute baserunner in baseball or softball

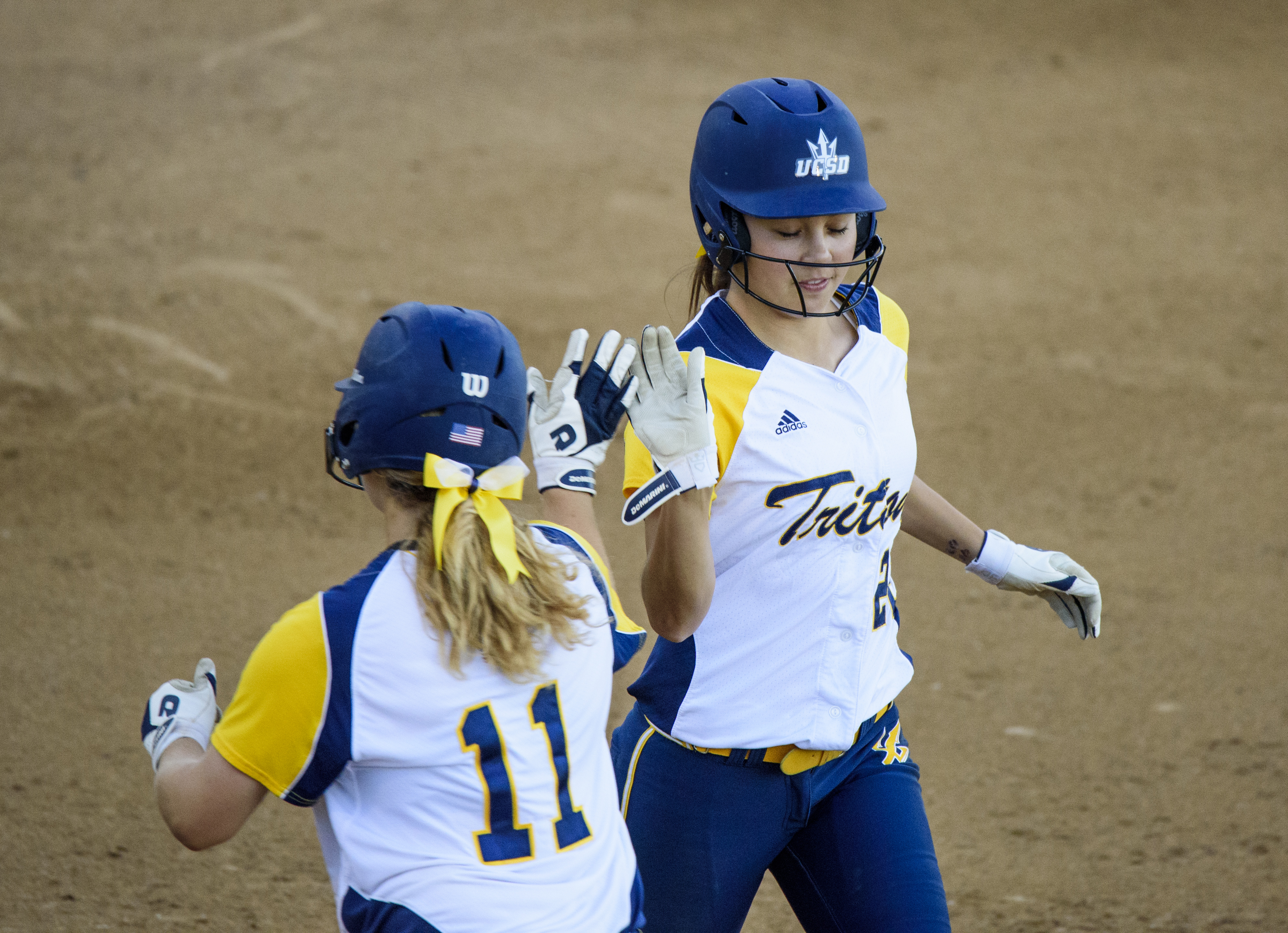
A pinch runner is substituted into a UC San Diego Tritons softball game

In baseball or softball, a pinch runner is a player substituted into a game for the purpose of base running.

== Description ==
A pinch runner may be faster or otherwise more skilled at base running than the player for whom the pinch runner has been substituted. Occasionally, a pinch runner is inserted for other reasons (such as a double switch, ejection, or if the original player on base has become injured). For statistical and scorekeeping purposes, the pinch runner is denoted by PR.

As with all substitutions at most levels of baseball, when a player is pinch run for, that player is removed from the game. Some leagues, especially for youths, may allow substituted players to re-enter a game. After serving as a pinch runner, a player may remain in the game and assume a defensive position, or may be substituted for at the manager's discretion.

== Use in Major League Baseball ==
In the early history of professional baseball, the National League, which began play in 1876, changed a rule in 1878 such that pinch runners were not allowed except in cases of illness or injury, with the substitute entering the game after the original player reached base. Later rule changes allowed for pinch runners at a manager's discretion.

A pinch runner is not credited with a game played for the purpose of consecutive-game playing streaks, per the Official Rules used by Major League Baseball (MLB). For example, in May 1984, Alfredo Griffin of the Toronto Blue Jays scored the winning run in a game, yet his consecutive game streak ended as he appeared only as a pinch runner.

One of the most famous pinch runners in major-league history was Herb Washington of the Oakland Athletics. Oakland owner Charlie Finley, known as an unconventional thinker, came to believe that it would be useful to have a "designated runner"—a fast player on the roster whose only job was to periodically enter a game and run the bases for slower players. He signed Washington, a track star with no baseball experience. Washington appeared in 105 games for the Athletics in 1974 and 1975, scoring 33 runs and stealing 31 bases, without once playing the field or coming up to bat. His 1975 Topps baseball card is the only baseball card known to use a "Pinch Runner" position label.

Outfielder Dave Roberts made a notable appearance as a pinch runner in the bottom of the ninth inning of Game 4 of the 2004 American League Championship Series, stealing a base and going on to score the tying run in a game the Boston Red Sox went on to win in 12 innings, leading to a series victory over the New York Yankees.

As of 2023, MLB was considering allowing teams to have a "designated runner". The Atlantic League of Professional Baseball, an official MLB Partner League, tested rules for a designated runner in 2023. As described by BallparkDigest.com, the rules for a designated runner were:

Each club will list a player who is not otherwise in the starting lineup as a designated pinch runner. That player may then be substituted at any point into the game as a baserunner. The player who is substituted for, as well as the pinch runner, may then return to the game without penalty.

=== Courtesy runners ===
Between 1877 and 1949, major-league teams occasionally used "courtesy runners" in addition to pinch runners. A baserunner that had to leave the game temporarily, due to injury or an equipment issue, could be replaced by a courtesy runner. The courtesy runner could be a player who had not yet appeared in the game (in which case, the courtesy runner could still be used later as a substitute) or could be a player already in the game (in which case, that player's position in the batting order was not affected). The player who had to leave was free to rejoin the game when his team returned to the field defensively, although in some cases, an injury proved to be serious enough that he was replaced by a substitute. The last use of a courtesy runner in the major leagues was in 1949.

An example of a courtesy runner occurred in a game between the Detroit Tigers and St. Louis Browns during the 1944 season, on August 31. In the second inning, Detroit right fielder Jimmy Outlaw was hit in the head by a pitch, leaving him temporarily unconscious. With permission of the St. Louis manager, Detroit first baseman Rudy York, who had made the first out of the inning, ran for Outlaw. After Detroit finished batting that half-inning, both Outlaw (who had "recovered shortly") and York returned to their defensive positions and played the rest of the game.

The Official Rules used by MLB now forbid courtesy runners.

=== Mid-play runners ===
During major-league history, there have been a few instances of "mid-play runners". This is a rare situation where the Official Rules allow an injured baserunner to be substituted, and play then resumes. Two known instances—occurring in 1977 and 2005—occurred when a baserunner entitled to score was injured such that he had to be removed from the game, and a substitute was allowed to enter the game to finish the base running and score the run. A similar instance, which occurred in 2008 but did not involve injury, occurred due to a replay review that turned an apparent single, following which the batter was replaced by a pinch runner, into a home run—the pinch runner then ran out the home run to score the run.

=== Some players known primarily as pinch runners ===
- Herb Washington: 31 stolen bases, 33 runs scored, 0 at bats
- Matt Alexander: 103 stolen bases, 111 runs scored, 168 at bats
- Allan Lewis: 44 stolen bases, 47 runs scored, 29 at bats
- Terrance Gore: 43 stolen bases, 33 runs scored, 74 at bats
- Don Hopkins: 21 stolen bases, 25 runs scored, 6 at bats
- Sandy Piez: 4 stolen bases, 9 runs scored, 8 at bats
- Darrell Woodard: 3 stolen bases, 10 runs scored, 9 at bats
- Rico Noel: 5 stolen bases, 5 runs scored, 2 at bats
- Alberto Lois: 1 stolen bases, 6 runs scored, 4 at bats
- Miguel Mejía: 6 stolen bases, 10 runs scored, 23 at bats
- Eddie Phillips: 0 stolen bases, 4 runs scored, 0 at bats
- Blue Moon Odom: 295 games as a pitcher; 105 games as a pinch runner

== See also ==
- Pinch hitter
