= Tommy Helms =

American baseball player and manager (1941–2025)

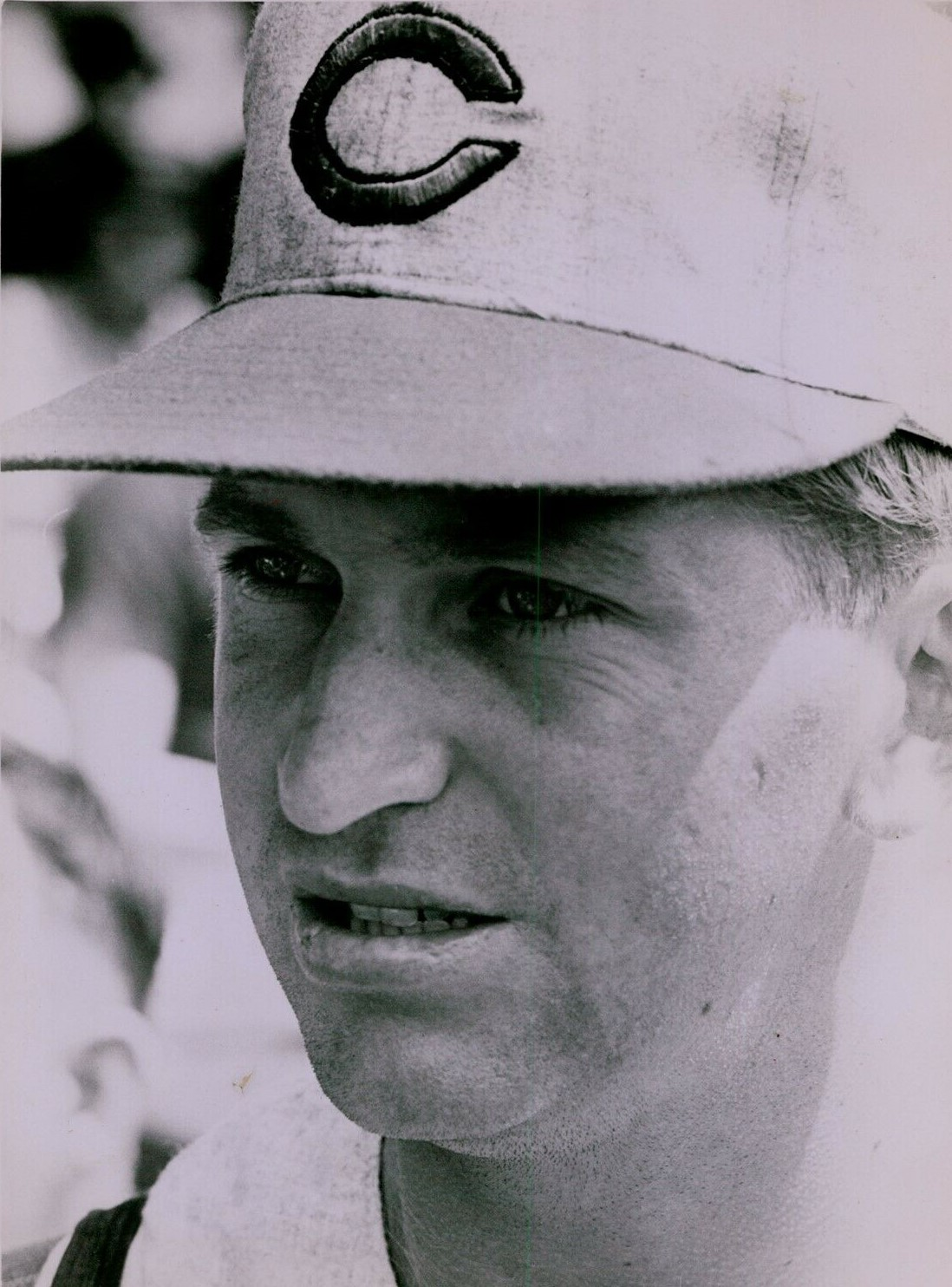
- Helms c. 1965
- Second baseman / Manager
- Born: May 5, 1941; Charlotte, North Carolina, U.S.
- Died: April 13, 2025 (aged 83); Cincinnati, Ohio, U.S.
- Batted: Right Threw: Right

MLB debut
- September 23, 1964, for the Cincinnati Reds

Last MLB appearance
- October 1, 1977, for the Boston Red Sox

MLB statistics
- Batting average: .269
- Home runs: 34
- Runs batted in: 477
- Managerial record: 28–36
- Winning %: .438
- Stats at Baseball Reference
- Managerial record at Baseball Reference

Teams
- As player: Cincinnati Reds (1964–1971); Houston Astros (1972–1975); Pittsburgh Pirates (1976–1977); Boston Red Sox (1977); As manager: Cincinnati Reds (1988–1989)

Career highlights and awards
- 2× All-Star (1967, 1968); NL Rookie of the Year (1966); 2× Gold Glove Award (1970, 1971); Cincinnati Reds Hall of Fame

Tommy Vann Helms (May 5, 1941 – April 13, 2025) was an American professional baseball player and manager. Over a 14-year Major League Baseball (MLB) career (1964–1977), Helms played for four teams, including eight seasons with the Cincinnati Reds, four with the Houston Astros, and one each with the Pittsburgh Pirates and Boston Red Sox. He won the 1966 National League Rookie of the Year Award, two Gold Glove Awards at second base, and he was twice an MLB All-Star. Helms also managed the Reds for parts of two seasons (1988–1989).

== Early life ==
Helms was born May 5, 1941, in Charlotte, North Carolina, and was a 1959 graduate of West Mecklenburg High School, where he played baseball and basketball. In 1959, he signed as an amateur free agent with the Reds at age 18. He served in the U.S. Marine Corps beginning in October 1963.

== Minor league career ==
In 1959-60, Helms played shortstop for the Palatka RedLegs of the Class-D Florida State League. In his only full season, 1960, he had a .292 batting average, but only a .918 fielding percentage, in 137 games. In 1961, he moved up to the Class-B Topeka Reds in the Illinois-Indiana-Iowa League (Triple-I League) again playing shortstop. He hit .277, and his fielding percentage improved to .936.

In 1962, he was promoted to the Single-A Macon Peaches. Again playing shortstop, Helms hit .340 with an OPS of .809. His fielding percentage improved to .953. In 1963, he was promoted to the San Diego Padres of the Triple-A Pacific Coast League, where he played in 138 games. The Reds had him play some games at second base, while still playing the majority of his games at shortstop. His batting average fell to .225, but his fielding percentage at shortstop again rose (.963). His fielding percentage at second base was .933.

In 1964-65, he played the majority of his games with the Padres. In 1964, his batting average rose to .309, while playing all of his games at shortstop. In 1965, he played 93 games for the Padres, all at shortstop. His batting average rose again (.319), and he had a minor league career best .973 fielding percentage. He played in 21 games for the Reds that year, ending his minor league career.

== MLB career ==
=== Cincinnati Reds ===
Helms appeared briefly with the Reds in 1964, playing only in two games. He made his major league debut on September 23, 1964, against the Philadelphia Phillies with one plate appearance that year. He also had a short stint with the Reds in 1965, hitting .381 in 46 plate appearances. On September 1, 1965, playing in both games of a doubleheader, Helms batted 4-for-4 with two triples (including a pinch-hit triple in game 1).

Helms's first full season in the majors was 1966. A natural shortstop, Helms was ultimately moved to third base by the Reds his rookie season, with Leo Cárdenas firmly entrenched at short since 1962. Cardenas was second in the National League in fielding percentage among shortstops in 1965, and would lead the league in 1966. Helms originally played second base to start the season, where Pete Rose had played the previous three years, with Rose moving to third base. This did not work for Rose, so he returned to second base, with Helms moving to third base, where he had never played before. Helms clubbed nine home runs, batted .284, and provided sparkling defense at his new position. He was second in the NL among third basemen in fielding percentage, .961, just behind Bob Aspromote's .962 fielding percentage. Helms was selected as the 1966 National League Rookie of the Year.

In 1967, the Reds shuffled their line-up, moving budding superstar Tony Pérez to third, Helms to second, and Pete Rose from second base to left field. As a second baseman, Helms was a member of the National League All-Star Team in 1967 and 1968. In 1967, he was called up for U.S. Marines reserves duty during the summer, and had to get a furlough to participate in the 1967 All-Star Game. In 1968, he started the All-Star Game, with one hit and a base-on-balls in three at-bats. He was 25th in Most Valuable Player MVP voting in 1968.

The Reds moved to Riverfront Stadium on June 30, 1970, where Helms hit the first Reds home run on July 1, his only home run that year. Helms started all five games of the 1970 World Series, with four hits and one walk in 19 plate appearances as the Reds fell to the Baltimore Orioles.

He won the National League Gold Glove award at second base in 1970 and 1971. During his Gold Glove season of 1971, Helms set a Reds record turning 130 double plays, which led all major league second basemen that year. He also led all National League second basemen in double plays in 1970, and led all second basemen in putouts in 1971. While with the Reds, he led the National League's second basemen in fielding percentage in 1970 (.983) and 1971 (.990).

In his autobiography, Charlie Metro shares this anecdote about Morganna "The Kissing Bandit" and Helms: "At first the players were shy and would kind of run. But after a while, heck, the guys all loved it. One time in Cincinnati, she ran out there toward Tommy Helms. She ran right out beyond the infield, and Tommy was the type of guy who wouldn't run from her. He just opened up his arms and said, 'Come here, baby.'"

=== Houston Astros ===
On November 29, 1971, Helms was part of a blockbuster trade that brought Joe Morgan, Denis Menke, César Gerónimo, Ed Armbrister, and Jack Billingham from the Houston Astros for Helms, Lee May and Jimmy Stewart. In his first three years with the Astros, he hit .259, .287, and .279. He had career runs batted in (RBI) highs in 1972 (60) and 1973 (61). In 1972, he led all major league second basemen in assists (441) and double plays (115). His .979 fielding percentage was fifth in the league (with Joe Morgan's .990 first in the league). In 1973, his .988 fielding percentage was fourth in the National League, and in 1974, his .985 fielding percentage led the National League (with Morgan second). 1974 would be his last season as a full time starting player.

Helms had a dramatic drop off in 1975. During his first three Houston years, he never started less than 130 games, and never had less than 481 plate appearances. In 1975, he started only 28 games, with 147 plate appearances and a .207 batting average; though his fielding percentage in limited playing time remained typically excellent (.988).

=== Pirates, Athletics, and Red Sox ===
After four seasons in Houston, Helms was traded to the Pittsburgh Pirates (ultimately for Art Howe) prior to the start of the 1976 season. The Pirates brought him in as a reserve infielder. He played in only 62 games, with less than 100 at-bats, and was used at second base, shortstop, and third base. His rights were purchased by the Oakland A's in November 1976, but before the 1977 season started, he was traded back to the Pirates, along with Chris Batton and Phil Garner for Tony Armas, Doug Bair, Dave Giusti, Rick Langford, Doc Medich, and Mitchell Page during spring training.

Helms appeared in only 15 games for the Pirates, playing sparingly, and just three months after reacquiring Helms the Pirates released him. He signed with the Boston Red Sox for the remainder of the 1977 season, serving primarily as a designated hitter before calling it a career.

== Career statistics ==
In 1,435 games over 14 seasons, Helms compiled a .269 batting average (1,342-for-4,997) with 414 runs, 223 doubles, 21 triples, 34 home runs, 477 RBIs, 231 bases on balls, 301 strikeouts, .300 on-base percentage, and .342 slugging percentage. Defensively, he recorded a .980 fielding percentage at second base, third base, and shortstop. As of 2024, he ranks 92nd all-time in best strikeout percentage as a hitter, and 75th all-time for best fielding percentage at second base.

== Legacy and honors ==
During his 14 years in a major league uniform, Helms struck out only 301 times in nearly 5,000 at bats. Former Reds closer Clay Carroll was once asked, "Who would you want at second base when the game was on line?" He promptly responded, "Two words, Tommy Helms."

Helms was inducted into the Reds Hall of Fame in 1979. In 2013, Helms was inducted into the North Carolina Sports Hall of Fame.

== Managerial career ==
After retiring, Helms worked briefly in the catering business before joining the Texas Rangers as a coach for the 1981 season. In 1983, Helms joined the Reds coaching staff under manager Russ Nixon. He continued on the coaching staff in 1984, under managers Vern Rapp and Pete Rose (who managed the last 41 games that season). When Rose started the 1985 season as manager, he kept Helms on as a coach. Helms was still on Rose's coaching staff in 1988.

On April 30, 1988, during a home game against the New York Mets, and following a call by umpire Dave Pallone which allowed the Mets' eventual winning run to score in the 6–5 game, Rose argued vehemently and made physical contact with the umpire, noticeably pushing him. National League president A. Bartlett Giamatti suspended Rose for 30 days. Helms served as manager of the Reds during Rose's suspension and led the team to a 12–15 record.

On August 24, 1989, following accusations that he had gambled on baseball, Rose voluntarily accepted a permanent place on baseball's ineligible list, and Helms again replaced Rose as Reds manager. The Reds went 16-21 under Helms. He was replaced at the end of the season by Lou Piniella. Helms believed he was mistreated by Reds' ownership in not being given an opportunity to become the next manager, with considerable support from the players to keep him on as the permanent manager.

Helms later managed the Chicago Cubs Southern League affiliate Charlotte Knights in 1990 and the Atlantic City Surf of the independent Atlantic League in 2000 and 2001.

== Personal life and death ==
After retirement, Helms lived in North Carolina and later in Cincinnati. From 1990 to 1992, his son Tommy Helms Jr. played in the Chicago Cubs organization, and his son Ryan Helms played in 1994 and 1995 in the Chicago White Sox organization. Both sons died, months apart, in 2014. Helms's nephew, Wes Helms, played 13 years in the Majors.

Helms died on April 13, 2025, at the age of 83.

Preceded by Paul Schaal	Topps Rookie All-Star Third Baseman; 1966	Succeeded by Bobby Etheridge
