= Doug Bair =

American baseball player (born 1949)

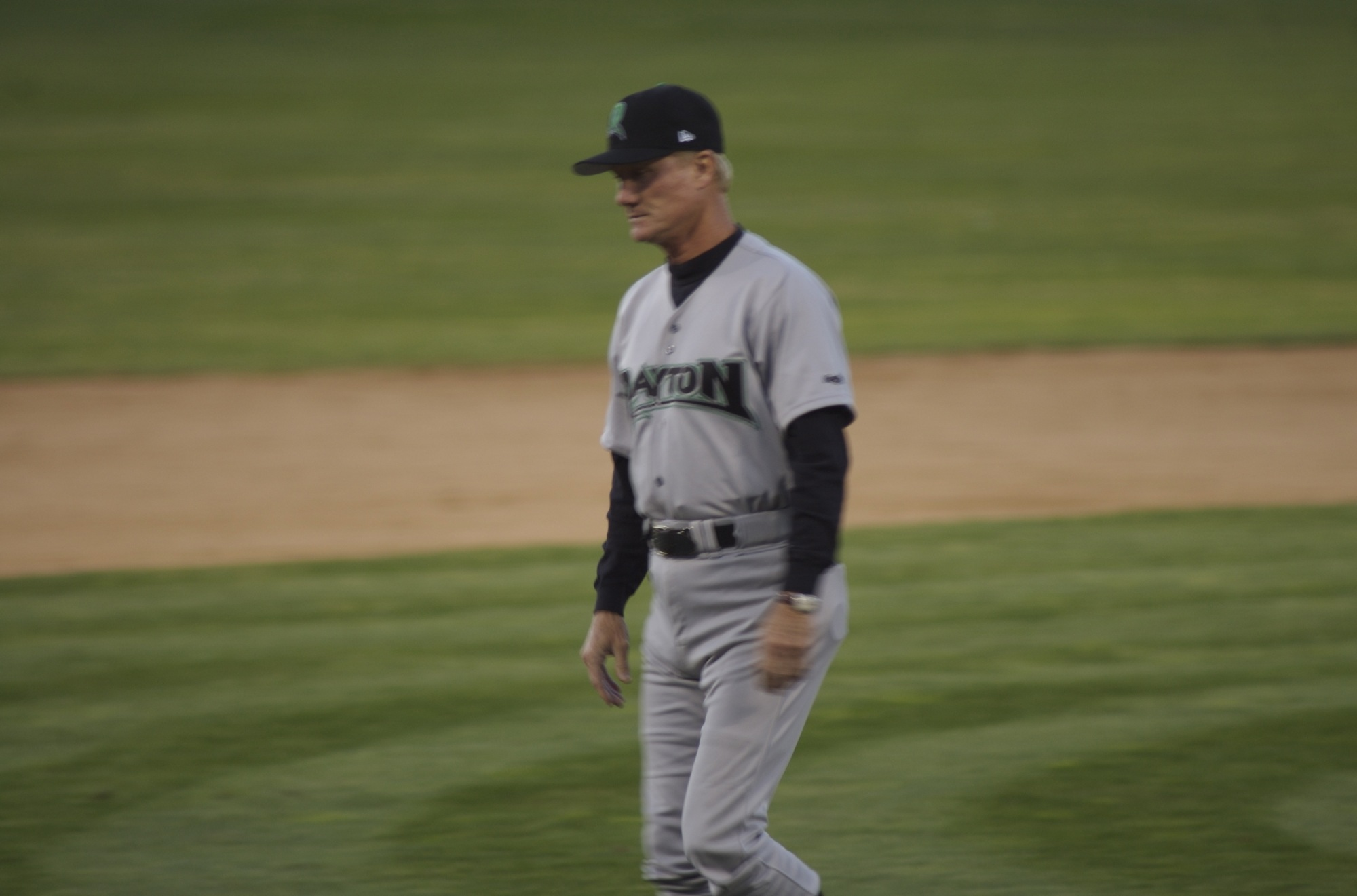
- Bair in 2006
- Pitcher
- Born: August 22, 1949 (age 76); Defiance, Ohio, U.S.
- Batted: Right Threw: Right

MLB debut
- September 13, 1976, for the Pittsburgh Pirates

Last MLB appearance
- October 3, 1990, for the Pittsburgh Pirates

MLB statistics
- Win–loss record: 55–43
- Earned run average: 3.63
- Strikeouts: 689
- Saves: 81
- Stats at Baseball Reference

Teams
- Pittsburgh Pirates (1976); Oakland Athletics (1977); Cincinnati Reds (1978–1981); St. Louis Cardinals (1981–1983); Detroit Tigers (1983–1985); St. Louis Cardinals (1985); Oakland Athletics (1986); Philadelphia Phillies (1987); Toronto Blue Jays (1988); Pittsburgh Pirates (1989–1990)

Career highlights and awards
- 2× World Series champion (1982, 1984)

Charles Douglas Bair (born August 22, 1949) is an American former professional baseball pitcher. He played for 15 Major League Baseball (MLB) seasons — from 1976 to 1990 — for seven teams.

Bair attended Oakwood High School in Paulding County, Ohio, and played collegiately at Bowling Green State University.

== Career ==
=== Pittsburgh Pirates ===
Bair was drafted by the Pittsburgh Pirates out of Bowling Green State University in the second round of the 1971 Major League Baseball draft and made his Major League debut on September 13, 1976, pitching two scoreless innings out of the bullpen against the New York Mets in a 5–0 loss. On March 15, 1977, Bair, Tony Armas, Dave Giusti, Rick Langford, Doc Medich, and Mitchell Page were traded to the Oakland Athletics for Chris Batton, Phil Garner, and Tommy Helms.

=== Oakland Athletics ===
Bair earned his first career victory on April 14, 1977, against the California Angels. On August 13, 1977, Bair recorded his first career save in a 9–6 win over the Baltimore Orioles. Overall, Bair finished the season with a 4–6 record and a 3.46 ERA in 83 1/3 innings pitched, while earning eight saves. The Athletics traded Bair to the Cincinnati Reds for Dave Revering and cash on February 25, 1978.

=== Cincinnati Reds ===
Bair had a breakout season with the Cincinnati Reds during the 1978 season, as he appeared in 70 games, posting a 7–6 record with a 1.97 ERA in 100 1/3 innings pitched, and saved 28 games for the team, the fourth highest save total in the National League. Bair struggled in 1979, as his ERA spiked to 4.26, and he lost his job as closer midway through the season. Bair finished with a record of 11–7, and 16 saves in 65 games, as the club reached the playoffs. In the 1979 NLCS against the Pittsburgh Pirates, Bair appeared in one game, the second game of the series, and allowed a run in the top of the tenth inning, earning the loss as the Pirates defeated the Reds 3–2. Bair appeared in 61 games with Cincinnati in 1980, going 3–6 with a 4.24 ERA, while earning six saves in 85 innings pitched. He began the 1981 season with the Reds, and in 24 games went 2–2 with a 5.77 ERA in 39 innings pitched. On September 10, 1981, the Reds traded him to the St. Louis Cardinals for Joe Edelen and Neil Fiala.

=== St. Louis Cardinals ===
Bair finished the 1981 season with the St. Louis Cardinals, going 2–0 with a 3.45 ERA in 11 games, while earning a save. In 1982 he appeared in 63 games, going 5–3 with a 2.55 ERA in 91 2/3 innings pitched, and recorded eight saves, helping St. Louis reach the playoffs. In the 1982 NLCS against the Atlanta Braves, Bair appeared in one game, pitching a scoreless inning. In the 1982 World Series against the Milwaukee Brewers, Bair played in three games, going 0–1 with a 9.00 ERA in two innings pitched, as the Cardinals won the World Series.

Bair started the 1983 season with the Cardinals, appearing in 26 games, going 1–1 with a 3.03 ERA, while earning a save in 29 2/3 innings pitched. On June 22, 1983, St. Louis traded Bair to the Detroit Tigers for future considerations.

=== Detroit Tigers ===
Bair finished 1983 in Detroit with his former manager from the 1978 Reds, Sparky Anderson. He played in 27 games, going 7–3 with a 3.88 ERA and four saves in 55 2/3 innings pitched. After making 388 relief appearances, Bair made his first major league start on August 23, 1983, pitching six shutout innings in a 2–0 victory over the Texas Rangers. Bair returned to Detroit in 1984, going 5–3 with a 3.75 ERA and four saves in 47 games pitched, helping Detroit to the playoffs. Bair did not appear in any games against the Kansas City Royals in the 1984 ALCS, but did appear in a game in the 1984 World Series against the San Diego Padres, pitching 2/3 of an inning, while allowing no runs, as the Tigers won the series. He struggled in 1985, as he played in 21 games, going 2–0 with a 6.24 ERA in 49 innings pitched. On August 22, 1985, he was released.

=== St. Louis Cardinals ===
On September 2, 1985, Bair signed with the St. Louis Cardinals, rejoining the team he played for from 1981 to 1983. Bair would appear in only two games with St. Louis, as he went 0–0 with a 0.00 ERA in two innings pitched. On November 12, 1985, Bair was granted free agency.

=== Oakland Athletics ===
On May 19, 1986, Bair signed with the Oakland Athletics, his second stint with the club. He went 2–3 with a 3.00 ERA in 31 games pitched, while recording four saves. On November 10, 1986, Bair became a free agent.

=== Philadelphia Phillies ===
Bair signed as a free agent with the Philadelphia Phillies on June 23, midway through the 1987 season. Bair played in 11 games with Philadelphia, going 2–0 with a 5.93 ERA in 13 2/3 innings pitched. Bair was released by the Phillies on March 26, 1988.

=== Toronto Blue Jays ===
On April 7, 1988, Bair signed as a free agent with the Toronto Blue Jays. Bair played in 10 games with Toronto, going 0–0 with a 4.05 ERA in 13 1/3 innings pitched. Bair was released by the Blue Jays on October 31, 1988, however, he re-signed with the team on February 17, 1989.

After playing with the Syracuse Chiefs, the Blue Jays Triple-A affiliate, to begin the 1989 season, the Pittsburgh Pirates purchased Bair's contract on June 16, 1989.

=== Pittsburgh Pirates ===
Bair finished the 1989 season with the Pittsburgh Pirates, going 2–3 with a 2.27 ERA in 44 games pitched, pitching 67 1/3 innings. Bair returned to the Pirates in 1990, going 0–0 with a 4.81 ERA in 22 games. On October 3, 1990, Bair pitched two scoreless innings against the New York Mets in what would be his last major league game.

The Pirates granted Bair free agency on November 5, 1990. In 1991, Bair split time between the Toledo Mud Hens, the Detroit Tigers Triple-A affiliate, and the Syracuse Chiefs, the Toronto Blue Jays Triple-A affiliate. In 1992, Bair pitched in seven games with the Edmonton Trappers, the California Angels AAA affiliate before retiring.

=== Major League career ===
Bair spent 15 seasons in Major League Baseball from 1976 to 1990. During his career he had a 55–43 record with a 3.63 ERA in 584 games, five of them starts. Bair also finished with 81 career saves, and struck out 689 batters in 909 1/3 innings pitched. In the playoffs, Bair went 0–2 with a 5.79 ERA in six games. He won two World Series championships, with the St. Louis Cardinals in 1982, and with the Detroit Tigers in 1984. A few days before the 1982 World Series his daughter, Heather Lea Bair, was born.

== Coaching career ==
In 2006, Bair served as pitching coach of the Billings Mustangs, the rookie-level minor league affiliate of the Cincinnati Reds. Bair spent 2007 and 2008 as pitching coach for the Dayton Dragons, the Class A Affiliate of the Cincinnati Reds.
