= Mitchell Page =

American baseball player (1951–2011)

- Designated hitter / Left fielder
- Born: October 15, 1951; Los Angeles, California, U.S.
- Died: March 12, 2011 (aged 59); Glendale, Arizona, U.S.
- Batted: Left Threw: Right

MLB debut
- April 9, 1977, for the Oakland Athletics

Last MLB appearance
- September 30, 1984, for the Pittsburgh Pirates

MLB statistics
- Batting average: .266
- Home runs: 72
- Runs batted in: 259
- Stats at Baseball Reference

Teams
- As player: Oakland Athletics (1977–1983); Pittsburgh Pirates (1984); As coach: Kansas City Royals (1995–1997); St. Louis Cardinals (2001–2004); Washington Nationals (2006–2007)

Mitchell Otis Page (October 15, 1951 – March 12, 2011) was an American professional baseball player and coach. He played in Major League Baseball as an outfielder and designated hitter from 1977 to 1984, most prominently as a member of the Oakland Athletics where, he placed second to Hall of Fame member Eddie Murray in the 1977 American League Rookie of the Year balloting.

Page made an impressive start to his major league career when he became the second player in Major League Baseball history with more than 20 home runs and 40 stolen bases in their rookie season; however, his offensive production declined over the next few seasons and he never lived up to the promise of his debut season. He played his final season with the Pittsburgh Pirates.

After the conclusion of his playing career, Page became a successful hitting coach for the Washington Nationals and for the 2004 National League champion St. Louis Cardinals. He also authored a book on hitting.

== Early years ==
Page was born in Los Angeles, California where he was a star baseball player at Centennial High School in Compton, California alongside fellow future major league player, Al Cowens. He was drafted by the Oakland Athletics in the fourth round of the 1970 Major League Baseball draft, but chose instead to attend Compton Community College. He then transferred to California State Polytechnic University, Pomona where he played alongside his future Athletics teammate, Wayne Gross. Page was drafted by the Pittsburgh Pirates in the third round of the 1973 Major League Baseball draft.

Page made a methodical climb up the minor league ladder, and in 1976 he joined the Triple-A Charleston Charlies in the International League. He had a .294 batting average with 22 home runs for the Charlies, earning him the team's Most valuable player award however, he remained in the minor leagues because the Pirates had Al Oliver, Richie Zisk, and Dave Parker in their major league outfield. Then on March 15, 1977, the Pirates and Oakland Athletics announced that Page was being traded along with Tony Armas, Doc Medich, Doug Bair, Dave Giusti and Rick Langford for Phil Garner, Chris Batton and Tommy Helms.

== Oakland A's ==
In Oakland, the star players of the Swingin' A's teams that won three consecutive World Series championships earlier in the decade had left the team by trades or via free agency. Page made his major league debut at the age of 25 on the opening day of the 1977 season, replacing the departed Joe Rudi as the Athletics' left fielder. His early performance indicated a promising career ahead of him when he began the season with an eight-game hitting streak along with a .500 batting average, as the Athletics surged to a 7-1 record. Page was named the American League Player of the Week on April 17th, just two weeks into his major league career. On September 2, he earned his second Player of the Week award and ended the season with a .307 batting average along with 21 home runs, 75 runs batted in and 42 stolen bases for the Athletics, becoming the second player in Major League Baseball history after Tommie Agee (1965) with more than 20 home runs and 40 stolen bases in their rookie seasons. Mike Trout (2012) and Corbin Carroll (2023) are the only other rookies to accomplish the feat.

Page also set the American League record for consecutive steals without being caught, stealing 26 consecutive bases before being caught stealing, breaking Don Baylor’s American League record of 25 in a row. He was fourth in the league with a 6.1 Wins Above Replacement (WAR) behind only Rod Carew, George Brett, and Carlton Fisk, and his .926 On-base plus slugging (OPS) was fourth in the American League behind only Carew, Ken Singleton, and Jim Rice. Page was named the Sporting News Rookie of the Year, and collected nine votes to Eddie Murray's twelve to finish second in voting for the AL Rookie of the Year Award.

Page had a respectable 1978 season, batting .285 with seventeen home runs and 70 RBIs. He then played in the 1978-79 Venezuelan winter league season for the Navegantes del Magallanes, helping the team win the league championship, thus qualifying for the 1979 Caribbean Series held in Puerto Rico. Page led the Magallanes to the Caribbean Series victory, leading the round-robin tournament with 2 home runs and 11 runs batted in, earning him the Series’ Most Valuable Player award in what he called the biggest thrill of his baseball career.

Page was involved in a contract dispute with Athletics owner Charlie Finley during Spring training 1979, and wound up getting suspended by the owner for refusing to play in exhibition games. He was used as the designated hitter during the regular season as injuries had limited his range in the outfield. He produced just a .247 batting average with nine home runs and 42 RBIs in his new role.

Page batted just .146 with four home runs and thirteen RBIs in the first half of the strike shortened 1981 season. When play resumed in August, Page saw just three more at-bats for the rest of the season, spending most of his time with the triple A Tacoma Tigers. The Athletics won the first half of the season; Page was kept off the roster for 1981 American League Division Series against the Kansas City Royals and the 1981 American League Championship Series against the New York Yankees. Page spent most of 1982 with Tacoma and 1983 on the disabled list.

== Pittsburgh Pirates ==
Page was released by the Athletics during Spring training 1984. He signed a minor league deal with the Pittsburgh Pirates shortly afterwards, and in twelve at bats, hit .333, with three walks as a pinch hitter in August. Page played in his final major league game on September 30, 1984 at the age of 32. After spending all of 1985 with Pittsburgh's Triple-A affiliate in Hawaii, he was released.

In an eight-year major league career, Page played in 673 games, accumulating 560 hits in 2,104 at bats for a .266 career batting average along with 72 home runs, 259 runs batted in, a .346 on-base percentage and 104 stolen bases. He finished his career with a .963 fielding percentage.

== Coaching career ==
Page returned to Tacoma as their hitting coach from 1992 through 1994, and served as first base coach for the Kansas City Royals from 1995 to 1997.

He accepted a job with the St. Louis Cardinals as hitting coach for the Memphis Redbirds in 1998. From there, he moved to minor league hitting coordinator in 1999. Midway through the 2001 season, he was promoted to the St. Louis Cardinals as hitting coach. Page worked with rookie Albert Pujols who went on to win the Rookie of the Year award and became one of the best hitters in Major League Baseball. In 2004, the Cardinals led the National League in batting average, runs and slugging percentage. He remained with the club through the 2004 World Series, but left the post immediately afterwards to enter an alcohol treatment facility near his Oakland, California home. The Cardinals batted just .190 in the World Series against the Boston Red Sox.

Page returned to baseball as minor league hitting instructor for the Washington Nationals in 2005, and became the major league hitting coach in 2006. In 2006 he authored a book on hitting titled, The Complete Manual of Hitting. Page left the job in May 2007 due to a relapse of his alcoholism. He returned to the organization later in the year as a roving minor league instructor. He rejoined the Cardinals' organization, and began 2010 as a coach with the Quad Cities River Bandits, but left in May due to "personal reasons."

Page played the role of the California Angels first baseman, "Abascal", in the 1994 Disney movie Angels in the Outfield.

== Death ==
Page died in his sleep on March 12, 2011, at the age of 59. The cause of death was not immediately disclosed.

== See also ==
- List of St. Louis Cardinals coaches
