= Dave Giusti =

American baseball player (1939–2026)

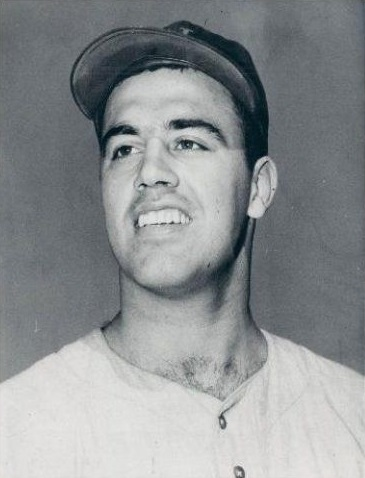
- Giusti with the Houston Astros in 1967
- Pitcher
- Born: November 27, 1939; Seneca Falls, New York, U.S.
- Died: January 11, 2026 (aged 86); Pittsburgh, Pennsylvania, U.S.
- Batted: Right Threw: Right

MLB debut
- April 13, 1962, for the Houston Colt .45s

Last MLB appearance
- September 27, 1977, for the Chicago Cubs

MLB statistics
- Win–loss record: 100–93
- Earned run average: 3.60
- Strikeouts: 1,103
- Saves: 145
- Stats at Baseball Reference

Teams
- Houston Colt .45's / Astros (1962, 1964–1968); St. Louis Cardinals (1969); Pittsburgh Pirates (1970–1976); Oakland Athletics (1977); Chicago Cubs (1977)

Career highlights and awards
- All-Star (1973); World Series champion (1971); NL saves leader (1971)

David John Giusti Jr. (November 27, 1939 – January 11, 2026) was an American professional baseball player. He played in Major League Baseball as a right-handed pitcher from 1962 to 1977 for the Houston Colt .45's / Astros, Pittsburgh Pirates, St. Louis Cardinals, Oakland Athletics, and Chicago Cubs. Giusti played for Pirates teams that won five National League Eastern Division titles in six years between 1970 and 1975 and won the World Series in 1971.

Giusti's trademark pitch was the palmball, which he learned in college and mastered in the major leagues. His 133 career saves rank fourth in Pirates history, while his 410 appearances rank eighth overall.

== Career ==
Giusti attended Syracuse University, where he played college baseball and college basketball for the Syracuse Orangemen. Giusti pitched in the 1961 College World Series as a starting pitcher. He signed out of college as a free agent with the Houston Colt .45s (later the Houston Astros), with whom he played from 1962 through 1968.

Shortly before the 1968 expansion draft, the Astros traded Giusti and Dave Adlesh to the St. Louis Cardinals for Johnny Edwards and Tommy Smith. The Cardinals left him unprotected in the expansion draft, and the San Diego Padres selected him in the third round. Two months later, the Padres traded Giusti back to the Cardinals for Danny Breeden, Ron Davis, Ed Spiezio, and Philip Knuckles. He competed for the fifth starter's role in spring training but lost out to Mike Torrez.

After the 1969 season, the Cardinals traded Giusti to the Pittsburgh Pirates with Dave Ricketts for Carl Taylor and Frank Vanzin. With the Pirates, he was converted into a relief pitcher by manager Danny Murtaugh, and Giusti soon became their closer. Giusti recorded 26 saves his first season in Pittsburgh, finishing fourth in the National League Cy Young voting and sixth in the NL MVP balloting.

In 1971, Giusti led the National League with 30 saves and appeared in three games for Pittsburgh in the 1971 World Series, earning a save in Game Four. Giusti won The Sporting News Reliever of the Year Award that year. Giusti was selected for the National League's All-Star Team in 1973. He pitched a one-two-three seventh inning as the National League won the game 7–1. From 1970 to 1975, Giusti led all Major League baseball pitchers in saves with 127.

Shortly before the start of the 1977 season, Giusti was traded to the Oakland Athletics as part of a ten-player trade, which also sent Tony Armas, Rick Langford, Doug Bair, Doc Medich, and Mitchell Page to Oakland and Phil Garner, Chris Batton, and Tommy Helms to Pittsburgh. In August, the Athletics sold Giusti's contract to the Chicago Cubs with whom Giusti finished the season, and after being released by the Cubs in November, Giusti retired from baseball.

== Personal life and death ==
Giusti married Virginia Lee Frykman, whom he met at Syracuse, in 1963. After his baseball career, Giusti lived in Mt. Lebanon, Pennsylvania. He worked for Millcraft Industries before he became a corporate sales manager for American Express.

Giusti died on January 11, 2026, at the age of 86.

== Honors ==
Giusti was selected as an inaugural member of the Syracuse Baseball Hall of Fame in 1998. He was elected to the Greater Syracuse Sports Hall of Fame in 1989, and the Pittsburgh chapter of the National Italian American Sports Hall of Fame in 1987.

== See also ==
- List of Major League Baseball annual saves leaders
- List of Major League Baseball leaders in games finished
- List of Major League Baseball career saves leaders
