= Ray Cosey =

American baseball player (born 1956)

- Pinch hitter
- Born: February 15, 1956 (age 70); San Rafael, California, U.S.
- Batted: Left Threw: Left

Professional debut
- MLB: April 14, 1980, for the Oakland Athletics
- NPB: April 4, 1981, for the Chunichi Dragons

Last appearance
- MLB: May 17, 1980, for the Oakland Athletics
- NPB: October 11, 1981, for the Chunichi Dragons

MLB statistics
- Batting average: .111
- Home runs: 0
- Runs batted in: 0

NPB statistics
- Batting average: .252
- Home runs: 15
- Runs batted in: 41
- Stats at Baseball Reference

Teams
- Oakland Athletics (1980); Chunichi Dragons (1981)

Donald Ray Cosey (born February 15, 1956) is an American former professional baseball player. He played for the Oakland Athletics of Major League Baseball during the 1980 season. He also played for the Chunichi Dragons in Japan in 1981.
