= Mark Williams (baseball) =

American baseball player (born 1953)

- Outfielder
- Born: July 28, 1953 (age 73); Elmira, New York, U.S.
- Batted: Left Threw: Left

MLB debut
- May 20, 1977, for the Oakland Athletics

Last MLB appearance
- May 22, 1977, for the Oakland Athletics

MLB statistics
- Batting average: .000
- Home runs: 0
- Runs batted in: 1
- Stats at Baseball Reference

Teams
- Oakland Athletics (1977)

Mark Westley Williams (born July 28, 1953) is an American former professional baseball outfielder. He played in three games for the Oakland Athletics of Major League Baseball in 1977, going 0-for-2 with 1 RBI.

== Sources ==
- Career statistics from Baseball Reference · Baseball Reference (Minors) · Retrosheet · Baseball Almanac
