= Mark Souza =

American baseball player (born 1955)

- Pitcher
- Born: February 1, 1955 (age 71); Redwood City, California, U.S.
- Batted: Left Threw: Left

MLB debut
- April 22, 1980, for the Oakland Athletics

Last MLB appearance
- May 18, 1980, for the Oakland Athletics

MLB statistics
- Win–loss record: 0–0
- Earned run average: 7.71
- Strikeouts: 2
- Stats at Baseball Reference

Teams
- Oakland Athletics (1980)

Kenneth Mark Souza (born February 1, 1955) is an American former Major League Baseball pitcher. Souza pitched in 1980 for the Oakland Athletics, throwing 7 innings over 5 games.

Souza was originally drafted in the first round of the 1974 Major League Baseball draft by the Kansas City Royals. He was taken in the 1976 Rule 5 Draft by the Minnesota Twins, and pitched two seasons in their system before being released. The A's signed him to a minor-league contract in 1979, and he made his major league debut in April of the following year. He was returned to the minors a month later, and never pitched in the majors again.
