= Sheldon Mallory =

American baseball player

- Outfielder
- Born: July 16, 1953 (age 72); Argo, Illinois, U.S.
- Batted: Left Threw: Left

MLB debut
- April 10, 1977, for the Oakland Athletics

Last MLB appearance
- September 27, 1977, for the Oakland Athletics

MLB statistics
- Batting average: .214
- Home runs: 0
- Runs batted in: 5
- Stats at Baseball Reference

Teams
- Oakland Athletics (1977)

Sheldon Mallory (born July 16, 1953) is an American former Major League Baseball outfielder. He played one season in the major leagues in 1977 for the Oakland Athletics.

Mallory was originally signed as an amateur free agent by the Kansas City Royals in 1972. He was traded to the New York Mets in December 1976, and was purchased from them by the Athletics the following April. After his lone major league season, he spent one season each in the Toronto Blue Jays and Cleveland Indians organizations before retiring.
