= Doc Medich =

American baseball player (born 1948)

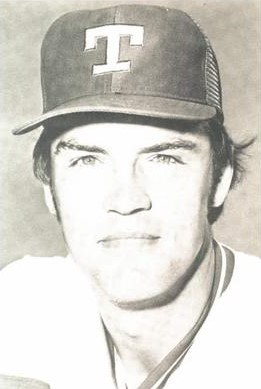
- Pitcher
- Born: December 9, 1948 (age 77); Aliquippa, Pennsylvania, U.S.
- Batted: Right Threw: Right

MLB debut
- September 5, 1972, for the New York Yankees

Last MLB appearance
- October 2, 1982, for the Milwaukee Brewers

MLB statistics
- Win–loss record: 124–105
- Earned run average: 3.78
- Strikeouts: 955
- Stats at Baseball Reference

Teams
- New York Yankees (1972–1975); Pittsburgh Pirates (1976); Oakland Athletics (1977); Seattle Mariners (1977); New York Mets (1977); Texas Rangers (1978–1982); Milwaukee Brewers (1982)

George Francis "Doc" Medich (/ˈmɛdɪtʃ/ MED-itch; born December 9, 1948) is an American former professional baseball player, and medical doctor. He pitched in the Major Leagues from 1972 to 1982. He was a medical student at the University of Pittsburgh School of Medicine, and acquired the nickname "Doc" during his early baseball career. He acquired his MD from the University of Pittsburgh School of Medicine in 1977, and he practiced medicine after his baseball career ended at the end of the 1982 season.

== Early years ==
While in college, Medich (of Serbian descent) pitched for the Pitt baseball team and played tight end on the Pittsburgh Panthers football team.

== Professional career ==
=== Draft and minors ===
Medich was drafted by the New York Yankees in the 30th round of the 1970 Major League Baseball draft, and spent three seasons as a starting pitcher in their farm system, going 21–13 over that span with a 2.27 ERA.

=== New York Yankees ===
Medich received a call to the majors in September 1972, facing four batters in his major league debut, giving up two singles and two walks. From there, Medich improved substantially, as he went 14–9 with a 2.95 ERA in 1973 to finish third in American League Rookie of the Year balloting. He was also the last Yankee winning pitcher at the original Yankee Stadium, pitching a shutout on September 29, 1973 against the Detroit Tigers. In 1974, Medich won a career high 19 games for the Yankees, tied with teammate Pat Dobson for most wins on the team. Following a 1975 season in which he went 16–16 with a 3.50 ERA, the Yankees sent Medich to the Pittsburgh Pirates for Willie Randolph, Dock Ellis and Ken Brett on December 11, 1975.

=== Pittsburgh Pirates ===
Medich spent just one injury plagued season with his hometown Pirates, going 8–11 with a 3.52 ERA. Medich put his medical training to good use during a game on the 11th of April against the Philadelphia Phillies at Veterans Stadium. A 73-year-old spectator collapsed with a heart attack, and Medich performed cardiopulmonary resuscitation on the spectator. During spring training in 1977, he was traded to the Oakland Athletics with Tony Armas, Doug Bair, Dave Giusti, Rick Langford and Mitchell Page for Chris Batton, Phil Garner and Tommy Helms.

=== 1977 season ===
Medich was unhappy with his trade as he was a student at the University of Pittsburgh School of Medicine, and wished to remain near the school. He threatened to retire, but later joined the A's, and went 10–6 with a 4.69 ERA. As he was slated to become a free agent at the end of the season, A's owner Charlie Finley attempted to sign Medich to an extension. Unsuccessful, he sold Medich's contract to the expansion Seattle Mariners in September. He was 2–0 with a 3.63 ERA in three starts for the Mariners before being placed on waivers, and selected by the New York Mets. He made one start for the Mets, losing to the Pirates.

=== Texas Rangers ===
Medich signed as a Free Agent with the Texas Rangers following the season, going 9–8 with a 3.74 ERA his first season with the club. His best season was the strike shortened 1981 season in which he went 10–6 with a 3.08 ERA, and tied for the AL lead with four shutouts with Richard Dotson, Ken Forsch, and Steve McCatty. In five seasons with the club, Medich went 50–43 with a 3.95 ERA.

=== Milwaukee Brewers ===
With the Rangers languishing in sixth place in the American League West, Medich's contract was sold to the Milwaukee Brewers, who were in first place in the American League East, on August 11, 1982. On August 27, Rickey Henderson broke Lou Brock's record for most stolen bases in one season against the Brewers with Medich on the mound. Medich reached the post-season for the only time in his career as a member of the Brewers. His only post-season appearance came in game six of the 1982 World Series. Already down 7–0 to the St. Louis Cardinals, Medich entered in the sixth inning, and gave up six runs (four earned) in two innings of work.

== Medical career ==
Medich entered the University of Pittsburgh School of Medicine in 1970 where he obtained his MD degree in 1977.

Twice during his baseball career, Medich went into the stands during a game to aid a fan who was suffering a heart attack. In 1976 in Philadelphia, he performed CPR and mouth-to-mouth resuscitation on a fan who died later that day. In a game on July 17, 1978, between the Texas Rangers and the Baltimore Orioles, he revived a man who was suffering a heart attack. The man survived and lived several more years.

Medich was charged in November 1983 with improperly prescribing Percodan and admitted into a substance abuse treatment program. At the time he was a resident in surgery at UPMC Children's Hospital of Pittsburgh. In 1984, he was sentenced to two years of probation and fined $5,000 (equivalent to $15,495 in 2025) in connection with those charges.

Medich was subsequently accused of having written twelve false prescriptions for painkillers in 1999. In 2001, he pleaded guilty to twelve counts of possession of a controlled substance. In March, he was sentenced to nine years of probation and voluntarily surrendered his right to prescribe painkillers.

The American Academy of Orthopaedic Surgeons voted to expel Medich.
