= Don Hopkins (baseball) =

American baseball player (born 1952)

- Pinch runner / Designated hitter / Outfielder
- Born: January 9, 1952 (age 73); West Point, Mississippi, U.S.
- Batted: Left Threw: Right

MLB debut
- April 8, 1975, for the Oakland Athletics

Last MLB appearance
- October 3, 1976, for the Oakland Athletics

MLB statistics
- Games played: 85
- Runs scored: 25
- Stolen bases: 21
- Hits: 1
- Stats at Baseball Reference

Teams
- Oakland Athletics (1975–1976)

Donald Hopkins (born January 9, 1952) is an American former professional baseball player. An outfielder during his minor league baseball career, he was used almost exclusively as a pinch runner by the 1975 American League West Division champion Oakland Athletics. He stood 6 feet (1.8 m) tall and weighed 170 pounds (77 kg), batted left-handed and threw right-handed.

Although a native of West Point, Mississippi, Hopkins attended Benton Harbor High School in Benton Harbor, Michigan where he played baseball with Dave Machemer. and was signed as an undrafted free agent by the Montreal Expos in 1970. A speedy baserunner, Hopkins stole over 40 bases four times in his minor league career, and was acquired the Athletics from Montreal just prior to the 1975 campaign. At the time, Oakland owner Charlie Finley — one of the early proponents of the designated hitter rule, adopted in the American League in 1973 — was also advocating the creation of the "designated runner" in baseball, and he regularly employed fast players on his 25-man roster to specialize in pinch running. Hopkins fulfilled that role during the 1975 season. He appeared in 82 games, largely pinch-running for future Baseball Hall of Fame member and veteran Billy Williams, who was Oakland's designated hitter. Hopkins stole 21 bases and scored 25 runs, but had only eight plate appearances. He drew two walks and had one career hit, a single, off the Detroit Tigers' Fernando Arroyo in a lopsided, 16–4 Oakland win on July 22.

Hopkins spent much of 1976 in the minor leagues, although he made three more pinch-running appearances for Oakland during September 1976. He retired after the 1977 minor-league season.
