= Chris Batton =

American baseball player (born 1954)

- Pitcher
- Born: August 24, 1954 (age 72); Los Angeles, California, U.S.
- Batted: Right Threw: Right

MLB debut
- September 19, 1976, for the Oakland Athletics

Last MLB appearance
- October 2, 1976, for the Oakland Athletics

MLB statistics
- Win–loss record: 0-0
- Earned run average: 9.00
- Strikeouts: 4
- Stats at Baseball Reference

Teams
- Oakland Athletics (1976)

Christopher Sean Batton (born August 24, 1954) is an American former professional baseball pitcher. He played part of one season in Major League Baseball for the Oakland Athletics.

Batton was drafted by the Athletics in the 12th round of the 1972 Major League Baseball draft and remained in their organization as a pitcher until making his major league debut in September 1976. He pitched two games for the A's with no decisions. The following spring he was traded to the Pittsburgh Pirates with Phil Garner and Tommy Helms to the Pittsburgh Pirates for Tony Armas, Rick Langford, Doug Bair, Dave Giusti, Doc Medich, and Mitchell Page. He never pitched in the major leagues again.

Batton's twin brother John pitched briefly in the minor leagues in the Minnesota Twins organization in 1974.
