= Rick Langford =

American baseball player (born 1952)

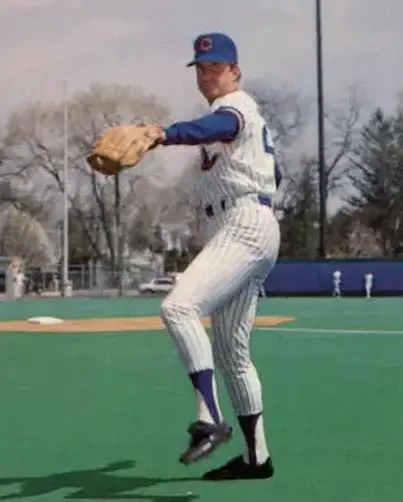
- Langford with the Columbus Clippers c. 1988
- Pitcher
- Born: March 20, 1952 (age 74); Farmville, Virginia, U.S.
- Batted: Right Threw: Right

MLB debut
- June 13, 1976, for the Pittsburgh Pirates

Last MLB appearance
- July 13, 1986, for the Oakland Athletics

MLB statistics
- Win–loss record: 73–106
- Earned run average: 4.01
- Strikeouts: 671
- Stats at Baseball Reference

Teams
- Pittsburgh Pirates (1976); Oakland Athletics (1977–1986)

James Rick Langford (born March 20, 1952) is an American former professional baseball pitcher who played for the Pittsburgh Pirates and Oakland Athletics of Major League Baseball (MLB) from 1976 through 1986. He has served as a coach for the Toronto Blue Jays in MLB and for their farm teams in Minor League Baseball.

== Career ==
Langford grew up in Varina, Virginia. He attended Varina High School, where he participated in four sports. He signed with the Pittsburgh Pirates as a free agent in 1973. He made his MLB debut with the Pirates in 1976. Before the 1977 season, the Pirates traded Langford, Tony Armas, Doug Bair, Dave Giusti, Doc Medich and Mitchell Page to the Oakland Athletics for Phil Garner, Chris Batton, and Tommy Helms.

In a streak that began on May 23, 1980, Langford pitched 22 consecutive complete games. The streak ended on September 17, when he came within 1/3 of an inning of another complete game. He then pitched consecutive complete games in his next three starts. Langford led the American League in complete games and innings pitched that year, and also won a career high 19 games for the Athletics. Charlie Metro was one of his coaches in Oakland and had this to say about him: "Rick Langford was another one of those pitchers with Oakland who was a little short on stuff but great on moxie. He knew how to pitch to get the most out of his skills. Boy, he had a lot of determination. He was a likeable guy. He'd give you a good effort every time he was out on the mound. Billy [Martin] loved him."

In 1983, Langford was hit by a line drive in his elbow and tore a muscle in the elbow when trying to play through the injury. However, he'd already been in decline before then. Although he reportedly had a sore elbow late in the 1982 season, his lackluster statistics (11-16, 4.32 ERA) led baseball writer Rob Neyer to wonder if he'd been injured earlier in the season. Neyer estimated that in 1981, Langford threw as many as 129 pitches per complete game, a heavy workload for a young pitcher even then. A's manager Billy Martin has often been criticized for overworking Langford and the other members of the 1981 rotation. He had a 4–19 win–loss record from the 1983 through 1986 seasons. He attempted a comeback to baseball in 1988, pitching for the Columbus Clippers, a minor league baseball affiliate of the New York Yankees. The Yankees did not promote him to the major leagues, and he retired after the season.

Langford joined the Toronto Blue Jays organization in 1996 as a pitching coach in the minor leagues. He served as a major league pitching coach in 2002. After the 2008 season, the Blue Jays named Langford their roving minor league pitching instructor. The Blue Jays named Langford their major league bullpen coach for the 2010 season. After the 2010 season, he became the Blue Jays' pitching rehab coordinator. He became the pitching coach for the Syracuse Chiefs of the Class AAA International League.

== Personal life ==
Langford lives in Florida with his wife Terrie, an art teacher. They have two children: Jamie, an elementary school teacher, and Travis, a lieutenant in the United States Air Force.
