= Tony Armas =

Venezuelan baseball player (born 1953)

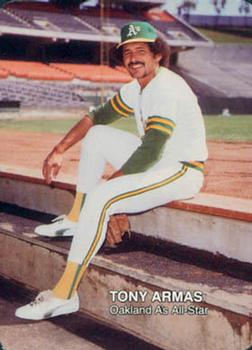
- Armas in 1987
- Outfielder
- Born: July 2, 1953 (age 73); Puerto Piritu, Venezuela
- Batted: Right Threw: Right

MLB debut
- September 6, 1976, for the Pittsburgh Pirates

Last MLB appearance
- October 1, 1989, for the California Angels

MLB statistics
- Batting average: .252
- Home runs: 251
- Runs batted in: 815
- Stats at Baseball Reference

Teams
- Pittsburgh Pirates (1976); Oakland Athletics (1977–1982); Boston Red Sox (1983–1986); California Angels (1987–1989)

Career highlights and awards
- 2× All-Star (1981, 1984); Silver Slugger Award (1984); 2× AL home run leader (1981, 1984); AL RBI leader (1984)

Member of the Venezuelan

Baseball Hall of Fame
- Induction: 2005

Antonio Rafael Armas Machado (born July 2, 1953) is a Venezuelan former professional baseball player. He played in Major League Baseball (MLB) as an outfielder from 1976 to 1989. He is the father of pitcher Tony Armas Jr. and the older brother of outfielder Marcos Armas.

Armas was one of the top power hitters in the American League in the early 1980s. Twice he led the American League in home runs, becoming the first Venezuelan player to win a Major League Baseball home run title, and topped all of MLB in runs batted in during the 1984 season. Armas was prone to injuries and went on the disabled list twelve times during his major league career, missing 302 games.

== Career ==
=== Pittsburgh Pirates ===
Armas debuted with the Pittsburgh Pirates' Gulf Coast League affiliate in 1971 just shy of his eighteenth birthday. He spent six seasons in their farm system, batting .270 with 69 home runs when he received a September call-up in 1976. He appeared in four games for the Pirates, and collected two hits in six at-bats.

During spring training in 1977, Armas, Doug Bair, Dave Giusti, Rick Langford, Doc Medich and Mitchell Page were dealt to the Oakland Athletics in exchange for Chris Batton, Phil Garner and Tommy Helms.

=== Oakland A's ===
Armas was the opening day right fielder for the A's in 1977, though by the end of the season, he was starting in center and saw most of his action there. Armas' inability to stay healthy limited him to just 91 games in 1978 and 80 in 1979. For 1980, Armas became a full-time right fielder, and finally played a full season, batting .279 with 35 home runs and 109 runs batted in in 158 games.

In the strike shortened 1981 season, Armas tied for the league lead in home runs (22) and games played (109) to be named the American League Player of the Year by The Sporting News. In 1982 he set a pair of major league records with eleven putouts and twelve total chances in right field in a single game against the Toronto Blue Jays. Following the season he was traded, along with Jeff Newman, to the Boston Red Sox for Carney Lansford, Garry Hancock and minor leaguer Jerry King.

=== Boston Red Sox ===
In Boston, Armas became the center fielder, sharing the outfield with Jim Rice (LF) and Dwight Evans (RF). Although he was booed by fans for his low batting average (.218), he placed second in the AL with 36 home runs and seventh with 107 RBI.

Armas had a monster 1984, batting .268 and leading the AL with 43 home runs, 123 RBI, 77 extra-base hits, and 339 total bases. He was named to The Sporting News and UPI postseason AL All-Star teams, was Boston's co-MVP, and placed seventh in AL MVP balloting.

From 1980 to 1985, Armas hit more homers (187) than any other AL player. His next two seasons were ruined by recurring leg injuries and Boston's acquisition of Dave Henderson. Armas was released after batting just once in the 1986 World Series. In the following years, he became a valuable role player for the Angels, and he retired after the 1989 season.

Twice he finished in the top ten in AL Most Valuable Player award balloting (4th, 1981; 7th, 1984).

=== California Angels ===
Armas was signed as a free agent by the California Angels In July 1987, and played 3 seasons with them (1987–1989) to finish out his Major League career. For his career playing in 1,432 games over 14 seasons, Armas tallied 251 home runs, 614 runs, 204 doubles, 39 triples, 815 RBI, and 1,302 hits.

== Family ties ==
Tony is one of 13 children, His younger brother, outfielder Marcos Armas, had a brief stint with the Athletics in the 1993 season, while his son Tony Jr. pitched from 1999 through 2008 for the Montreal Expos/Washington Nationals, Pittsburgh Pirates and New York Mets.

== Coaching career ==
Armas is the current Batting coach for the Leones del Caracas a team in the Venezuelan Professional Baseball League.

His playing career in Venezuela was a stellar one. He started playing with the Leones and later joined the Caribes de Oriente. His 97 career home runs were the Venezuelan professional baseball record, before another center fielder—Robert Pérez "the black wall" of Cardenales de Lara—set a new mark in 2007. In addition, Armas is fourth in the all-time list of RBI leaders, with 412.

In 2005, he earned induction into the Venezuelan Baseball Hall of Fame and Museum with 96% of the vote. He also was selected to the Caribbean Baseball Hall of Fame in 1998.

== See also ==
- List of second-generation Major League Baseball players
- List of Major League Baseball career home run leaders
- List of Major League Baseball annual runs batted in leaders
- List of Major League Baseball annual home run leaders
- List of Major League Baseball players from Venezuela
