= Craig Mitchell (baseball) =

American baseball player (born 1954)

- Pitcher
- Born: April 14, 1954 (age 71); Santa Rosa, California, U.S.
- Batted: Right Threw: Right

MLB debut
- September 25, 1975, for the Oakland Athletics

Last MLB appearance
- September 25, 1977, for the Oakland Athletics

MLB statistics
- Win–loss record: 0–2
- Earned run average: 7.82
- Strikeouts: 3
- Stats at Baseball Reference

Teams
- Oakland Athletics (1975–1977)

Craig Seton Mitchell (born April 14, 1954) is an American former professional baseball pitcher. Mitchell pitched in parts of three seasons, from 1975 until 1977, for the Oakland Athletics of the Major League Baseball(MLB).

== Career ==
Mitchell was the Oakland Athletics first-round draft pick in the secondary phase of the 1973 Major League Baseball draft. He had previously been drafted twice, once by the New York Mets and once by the New York Yankees, but did not sign with either team. Mitchell made his major league debut in September of 1975, starting and losing a game against the Chicago White Sox. Mitchell pitched one more game in 1976 and three in 1977, finishing his career with just 12.2 innings pitched in the majors.

== Sources ==
- Career statistics from Baseball Reference · Baseball Reference (Minors) · Retrosheet · Baseball Almanac, or Retrosheet
