= Phil Garner =

American baseball player and manager (1949–2026)

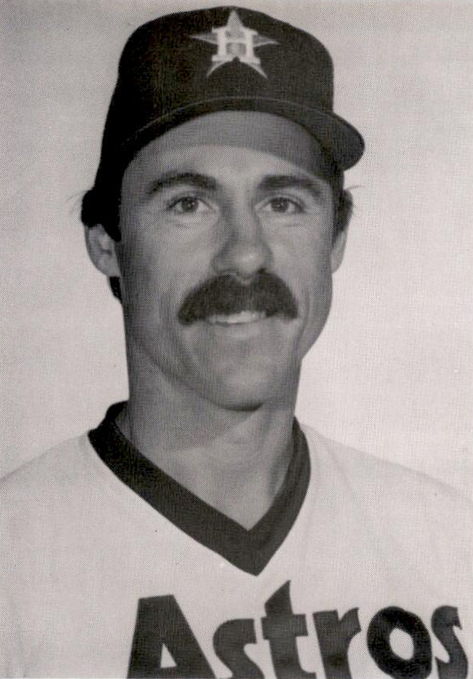
- Garner in 1983 publicity photo for Houston Astros
- Second baseman / Third baseman / Manager
- Born: April 30, 1949; Jefferson City, Tennessee, U.S.
- Died: April 11, 2026 (aged 76); The Woodlands, Texas, U.S.
- Batted: Right Threw: Right

MLB debut
- September 10, 1973, for the Oakland Athletics

Last MLB appearance
- October 2, 1988, for the San Francisco Giants

MLB statistics
- Batting average: .260
- Home runs: 109
- Runs batted in: 738
- Managerial record: 985–1,054
- Winning %: .483
- Stats at Baseball Reference

Teams
- As player: Oakland Athletics (1973–1976); Pittsburgh Pirates (1977–1981); Houston Astros (1981–1987); Los Angeles Dodgers (1987); San Francisco Giants (1988); As manager: Milwaukee Brewers (1992–1999); Detroit Tigers (2000–2002); Houston Astros (2004–2007)

Career highlights and awards
- 3× All-Star (1976, 1980, 1981); World Series champion (1979); Houston Astros Hall of Fame

Philip Mason Garner (April 30, 1949 – April 11, 2026) was an American professional baseball player and manager. He played in Major League Baseball (MLB) as an infielder with the Oakland Athletics, Pittsburgh Pirates, Houston Astros, Los Angeles Dodgers, and San Francisco Giants from 1973 to 1988. He was a three-time MLB All-Star. With the Pirates, he won the 1979 World Series. He managed the Milwaukee Brewers from 1992 to 1999, the Detroit Tigers from 2000 to 2002, and the Astros from 2004 to 2007. He led the Astros to their first league pennant and an appearance in the 2005 World Series.

== Early life ==
Garner was born on April 30, 1949, in Jefferson City, Tennessee, and grew up in Rutledge, Tennessee. After a year of high school in Rutledge, which did not have a football team, Garner's father moved the family to Knoxville, so Garner could attend Bearden High School, which had an athletic program with both football and baseball. Garner played football and baseball, and going to Bearden gave him an opportunity to play both sports, increasing his chance of obtaining an athletic scholarship to college, which would otherwise be unaffordable for the family. He was Bearden's starting quarterback in 1965–66.

Bearden's baseball facility is now named Phil Garner Ballpark, and the school dedicated a bronze bust of Garner in front of the facility in 2003.

He attended the University of Tennessee on a baseball scholarship, playing second and third base on the baseball team from 1968–70. In 1969, he led the NCAA in home runs with 12, and twice led his team in RBIs. He was selected All-Southeastern Conference twice and was named an All-American in 1970. Two years after being drafted into professional baseball, in 1973, Garner graduated with a business administration degree.

In 2002, he was inducted into the Tennessee Sports Hall of Fame. In 2009, the University of Tennessee retired his number 18.

== Baseball career ==
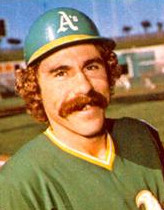
Garner in 1977 card for Oakland Athletics

Garner was originally drafted out of Tennessee by the Montreal Expos in the eighth round of the 1970 MLB draft, but did not sign. Seven months later, he was the second overall pick by the Oakland Athletics in the secondary January 1971 draft. Garner was in the A's minor league system from 1971 to 1974, playing almost all of his games as a third baseman.

In 1973, he played for the Tucson Toros of the Triple-A Pacific Coast League, with a .289 batting average, 14 home runs, 73 RBIs, and 87 runs scored. He came up to the A's for nine games at the end of the year, but was back at Tucson for the majority of the following year in 1974. He was even better at Tucson in 1974, batting .330, but again played sparsely when called up to the A's later in the year. The A's won two World Series in 1973 and 1974, but Garner was not on the World Series roster either year. Garner's problem was the A's had an All-Star third baseman in Sal Bando, so Garner had no place to play.

During spring training in 1975, the A's released second baseman Dick Green and converted Garner into a second baseman. He started 159 games at second base for the A's in 1975 and had a .968 fielding percentage. This was the first time since 1972, however, that the A's did not win the World Series. Among other things, the A's lost future Hall of Fame pitcher Catfish Hunter to the New York Yankees in one of the earliest free agency signings in modern baseball. On June 27, 1975, he got the A's 10,000th hit on a double off the California Angels' Andy Hassler in Anaheim. Garner had a breakout year for Oakland in 1976 in which he hit eight home runs and had 74 RBIs. He was named an All-Star that year, for the first time in his MLB career. He stole a career-high 35 bases that year.

Before the 1977 season, the Athletics traded Garner, Chris Batton, and Tommy Helms to the Pittsburgh Pirates for Tony Armas, Rick Langford, Doug Bair, Dave Giusti, Doc Medich, and Mitchell Page. Garner's best year as a player was in 1977, when he hit 17 HRs and 35 doubles, had 77 RBIs, stole 32 bases, and scored 99 runs. On September 15, 1978, Garner became one of only seven MLB players to hit a grand slam in consecutive games (including Babe Ruth twice), though as of 2024, the number is near 30.

In 1979, he was a member of the World Series champion Pittsburgh Pirates, batting .417 (5 for 12) in the 1979 National League Championship Series and .500 (12 for 24) in the World Series, a mark that stands as the highest World Series batting average (minimum 25 plate appearances).

Garner was nicknamed "Scrap-Iron" due to his gritty style of play. After being traded to Pittsburgh, the team's announcer, Milo Hamilton, asked Pirates Hall of Fame outfielder Willie Stargell about Garner. Stargell said the tough and competitive Garner was like an old piece of scrap metal that can be beaten and bent, but not broken. Hamilton then gave Garner the name "Scrap-Iron". His icon at the time was the scrappy, similarly mustachioed cartoon hero, Yosemite Sam. He was named an All-Star again in 1980, batting .259 while hitting 5 home runs, with 58 RBIs and stealing 32 bases. He was named an All-Star for a third and final time in his career the next season in 1981, though his statistics declined from previous years. He hit just one home run while having 26 RBIs on the year and had just 10 stolen bases.

On August 31, 1981, Garner was traded from the Pirates to the Houston Astros for second baseman Johnny Ray and pitcher Randy Niemann. In 1986, Garner helped Houston win a National League West Division title and reach the National League Championship Series (NLCS) to face the New York Mets. In game 6, on October 15, 1986, Garner was the Astros' starting third baseman in a 16-inning loss, going 1-for-3, until being replaced by a pinch-hitter. The Astros lost the NLCS to the Mets in six games. This was the final postseason appearance of his playing career. He remained with Houston until 1987.

Garner was traded in 1987 to the Los Angeles Dodgers, which granted him free agency after the season, and he then spent a year with San Francisco Giants in 1988. He went through 1989 without signing with any team and announced his retirement a year later.

== Career playing statistics ==
In 1,860 games over 16 seasons, Garner posted a .260 batting average (1594-for-6136) with 780 runs, 299 doubles, 82 triples, 109 home runs, 738 RBIs, 225 stolen bases, 564 bases on balls, a .323 on-base percentage, and a .389 slugging percentage. He finished his career with an overall .965 fielding percentage playing at second and third base and shortstop. In 21 postseason games, he batted .309 (21-for-68) with 10 runs, 5 doubles, 1 triple, 1 home run, 8 RBIs, and 8 walks.

== Managerial career ==
=== Milwaukee Brewers ===
On October 30, 1991, Garner was named manager of the Milwaukee Brewers, replacing Tom Trebelhorn. Garner was hired by general manager Sal Bando, his former A’s teammate. The Brewers chose him over Tony Muser, Don Baylor, Gene Tenace (another A's teammate), Mike Cubbage, Tommy Sandt, and Gene Lamont. He was one of several former players at the time named manager of an MLB team without previous major league managing experience. He quickly installed a running-focused style of play, as every starter that year stole at least 10 bases. Standing out were 1992 AL Rookie of the Year Pat Listach, who stole 54 bases, veteran Paul Molitor stealing 31 (doing so in his final season with the team), and outfielder Darryl Hamilton stealing 41.

He led the team to a nine-game improvement from the previous year and led the Brewers to second place in the American League East Division, losing out by four games to the eventual world champion Toronto Blue Jays. He finished second in voting for American League Manager of the Year. This was the last time until 2007 that the team would finish above .500. Garner would lead them to more than 80 losses in four of his six full seasons spent with the team, which had icons such as Paul Molitor and Robin Yount leave (the former in free agency and the latter due to retirement). He was fired in the midst of a 1999 season that saw them at 52–60 (Jim Lefebvre replaced him and went 22–27 to close out the year).

A 1993 game saw Garner refer to Chicago White Sox broadcasters Ken Harrelson and Tom Paciorek as "idiots" for their on-air insinuation that Garner was advising his pitcher to hit Frank Thomas. Garner challenged them to a fight, but they eventually resolved their differences. During a July 22, 1995, game against the White Sox, Garner was involved in a bench-clearing brawl, exchanging blows with Chicago manager Terry Bevington in a rare skipper-on-skipper fistfight. Garner and Bevington were both suspended four games for the fracas. With a record of 563–617 as manager, Garner led the Brewers for most wins and losses as a manager. Craig Counsell passed him in wins in 2022.

=== Detroit Tigers ===
In 2000, Garner was hired to manage the Tigers, in their inaugural season at Comerica Park after being a candidate to manage the Chicago Cubs. The Tigers were in contention for the American League Wild Card berth for much of the season but faded and finished 79–83. Garner did not manage a winning season in his years in Detroit, owing to a lack of competitive payroll, and when his 2002 team began the season 0–6, he and general manager Randy Smith were fired, with Luis Pujols as Garner's replacement. Pujols would lose 100 games in his only season managing the team. Garner was the manager soonest to be fired to start a season since Cal Ripken Sr. of the 1988 Baltimore Orioles. Garner was only the second manager to manage ten consecutive years where his team had a losing record.

=== Houston Astros ===
The 2004 season was different for Garner. After the Houston Astros had a mediocre start under then-manager Jimy Williams, having a 44–44 record in the first half of the season, Garner was brought in after the All-Star break to replace Williams. General manager Gerry Hunsicker was cited as saying the team believed that Garner would provide "decisive action" as a manager who could provide a spark to a team mired in hitting woes and an abundance of expectations with their free-agent signings (Roger Clemens and Andy Pettitte) that off season.

Undaunted, he led the Astros to a National League wild card berth, going 48–26 with Garner at the helm. The Astros won a total of 92 games and clinched a wild card berth on the final day of the season. The Astros won the 2004 National League Division Series over the Atlanta Braves after having lost to them in the postseason three times from 1997 to 2001, and it was their first postseason series victory in franchise history. They met the 105-win St. Louis Cardinals in the National League Championship Series. The Astros led the series 3–2 going into St. Louis, but they lost games 6 and 7 in late innings to lose the series.

The team experienced another slow start in 2005, losing 30 of their first 45 games, but made a run once again late in the season and came back to win another National League wild card, bolstered by the pitching talents of Clemens and Pettitte, to go along with 20-game winner Roy Oswalt. This time, Houston would beat the St. Louis Cardinals in the NLCS in six games, with Oswalt the series MVP, and win the pennant, only to be swept by the Chicago White Sox in the World Series.

In the 2005 NLDS against the Atlanta Braves, Garner was the Astros' manager in their 18-inning victory on October 9, 2005. Two weeks later in the 2005 World Series, Garner managed the Astros for the longest World Series game in length of time to that point (5 hours and 41 minutes). The Chicago White Sox won the game 7–5 in the 14th inning. This was later surpassed in both time (7 hours and 20 minutes) and innings (18) by game 3 of the 2018 World Series, in which the Dodgers prevailed over the Red Sox 3–2.

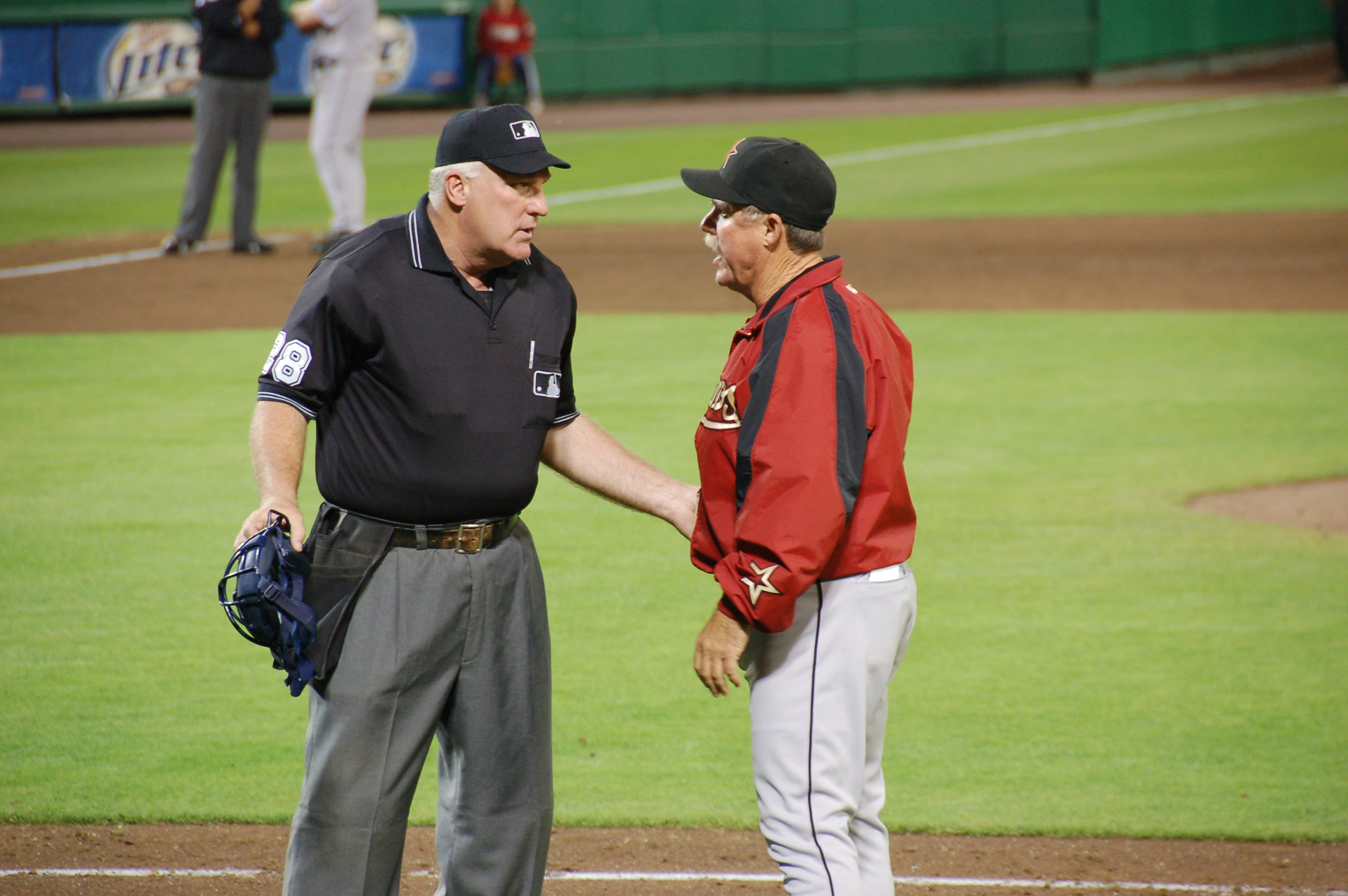
Garner (right) arguing with Larry Young during an Astros game against the Washington Nationals in May, 2006

Under his leadership in the last 12 games of the 2006 season, the Astros won 10 of 12, but lost out on a division title by a game and half. Garner's contract was extended through the end of the 2008 season by the Astros, but his coaches were replaced. As manager of a pennant-winning team the year before, Garner managed the 2006 National League All-Star Team in Pittsburgh on July 11, 2006. Garner named his former Pirates manager Chuck Tanner as one of the National League All-Star team coaches. Garner cited Tanner as one of his biggest coaching influences.

The Astros went into a tailspin in 2007, owing to the aging talent on their roster (Jeff Bagwell had retired in 2005, while Craig Biggio played his last season in 2007 to go with no Clemens or Pettitte, who each left for New York after 2006). On August 27, 2007, Garner was released by the Astros along with general manager Tim Purpura with the team having a record of 58–73. Cecil Cooper was named interim manager for the remainder of the season. Team owner Drayton McLane stated on the firing, "This was two years in the process. I've observed things, watched things, talked to literally hundreds of people as I go through. I went through the stands yesterday, and every game. I ask people, 'What do you think?' It's amazing what people will tell you. It's the impact others had on me, over a period of time." In 2009, Garner was interviewed as a candidate for the managerial job of the Astros when Cooper was fired, but Brad Mills was hired. In 2026, Garner was announced for induction into the Astros Hall of Fame.

== Managerial record ==
Team	Year	Regular season					Postseason			
Team	Year	Games	Won	Lost	Win %	Finish	Won	Lost	Win %	Result
MIL	1992	162	92	70	.568	2nd in AL East	–	–	–	–
MIL	1993	162	69	93	.426	7th in AL East	–	–	–	–
MIL	1994	115	53	62	.461	5th in AL Central	–	–	–	–
MIL	1995	144	65	79	.451	4th in AL Central	–	–	–	–
MIL	1996	162	80	82	.494	3rd in AL Central	–	–	–	–
MIL	1997	161	78	83	.484	3rd in AL Central	–	–	–	–
MIL	1998	162	74	88	.457	5th in NL Central	–	–	–	–
MIL	1999	112	52	60	.464	fired	–	–	–	–
MIL total		1,180	563	617	.477		–	–	–	
DET	2000	162	79	83	.488	3rd in AL Central	–	–	–	–
DET	2001	162	66	96	.407	4th in AL Central	–	–	–	–
DET	2002	6	0	6	.000	fired	–	–	–	–
DET total		330	145	185	.439		0	0	–	
HOU	2004	74	48	26	.649	2nd in NL Central	6	6	.500	Lost NLCS (STL)
HOU	2005	162	89	73	.549	2nd in NL Central	7	7	.500	Lost World Series (CHW)
HOU	2006	162	82	80	.506	2nd in NL Central	–	–	–	–
HOU	2007	131	58	73	.443	fired	–	–	–	–
HOU total		530	277	252	.524		13	13	.500	
Total		2,040 (Note: Garner also managed a game on June 30, 2005 that ended in a tie.)	985	1,054	.483		13	13	.500	

== Later career ==
In 2008, Phil Garner served as interim head coach for the UHV Jaguars baseball team of the University of Houston–Victoria. Garner temporarily replaced former Astros teammate Terry Puhl while he fulfilled his obligation as manager of the Canadian national baseball team.

In 2010, Garner admitted to using a corked bat against pitcher Gaylord Perry and that he hit a home run with it. Perry himself was notorious for throwing the illegal spitball.

On August 11, 2011, Garner agreed to rejoin the Athletics as a special adviser. He returned for the 2012 season in the same position.

In 2012, Garner was asked to testify as a witness at the perjury trial of Roger Clemens, which involved his detailing the intense work ethic of Clemens as an athlete (such as working out in a flak jacket with 60-pound (27 kg) weights) that were done without performance-enhancing drugs.

== Personal life and death ==
Garner was married to Carol and had three children. He died in The Woodlands, Texas, from pancreatic cancer on April 11, 2026, at the age of 76.
