= Matt Alexander =

American baseball player (born 1947)

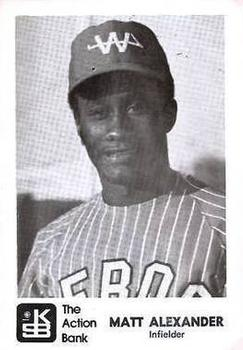
- Outfielder
- Born: January 30, 1947 (age 78); Shreveport, Louisiana, U.S.
- Batted: Switch Threw: Right

MLB debut
- August 23, 1973, for the Chicago Cubs

Last MLB appearance
- October 3, 1981, for the Pittsburgh Pirates

MLB statistics
- Batting average: .214
- Runs scored: 111
- Stolen bases: 103
- Stats at Baseball Reference

Teams
- Chicago Cubs (1973–1974); Oakland Athletics (1975–1977); Pittsburgh Pirates (1978–1981)

Career highlights and awards
- World Series champion (1979)

Matthew Alexander (born January 30, 1947) is an American former professional baseball player. He was a utility player in Major League Baseball (MLB) for the Chicago Cubs, Oakland Athletics, and Pittsburgh Pirates. He holds the record for most appearances as a pinch runner in MLB history.

== Playing career ==
In his later years, Alexander was used mostly as a pinch runner by manager Chuck Tanner, and so earned the sobriquet "Matt the Scat". Tanner had managed in Oakland in 1976 and brought Alexander with him after he became the manager of the Pirates. Alexander helped the Athletics win the 1975 American League West Division title and the Pirates in the 1979 World Series. He played every non-pitching position in his major league career except catcher and first base.

He is one of only seven players (excluding pitchers) to have played at least 100 games and have more games played than at-bats.
