= Wayne Gross =

American baseball player (born 1952)

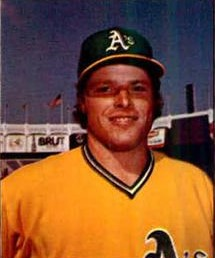
- Third baseman
- Born: January 14, 1952 (age 74); Riverside, California, U.S.
- Batted: Left Threw: Right

MLB debut
- August 21, 1976, for the Oakland Athletics

Last MLB appearance
- October 1, 1986, for the Oakland Athletics

MLB statistics
- Batting average: .233
- Home runs: 121
- Runs batted in: 396
- Stats at Baseball Reference

Teams
- Oakland Athletics (1976–1983); Baltimore Orioles (1984–1985); Oakland Athletics (1986)

Career highlights and awards
- All-Star (1977)

Wayne Dale Gross (born January 14, 1952), is an American former professional baseball player who played in Major League Baseball (MLB) primarily as a third baseman from 1976-1986. Gross was named to the All-Star Game as a rookie in 1977 as a last-minute injury replacement for Vida Blue. As a rookie Gross belted 22 home runs on the year. On December 8, 1983, Gross was traded by the Oakland Athletics to the Baltimore Orioles for Tim Stoddard.

Along with former big leaguer Carney Lansford, Gross makes a cameo in the 1994 Disney movie, Angels in the Outfield as a relief pitcher for the Chicago White Sox.

Gross coached high school baseball and tennis for a time at Monte Vista High School in Danville, California.
