= List of Milwaukee Brewers Opening Day starting pitchers =

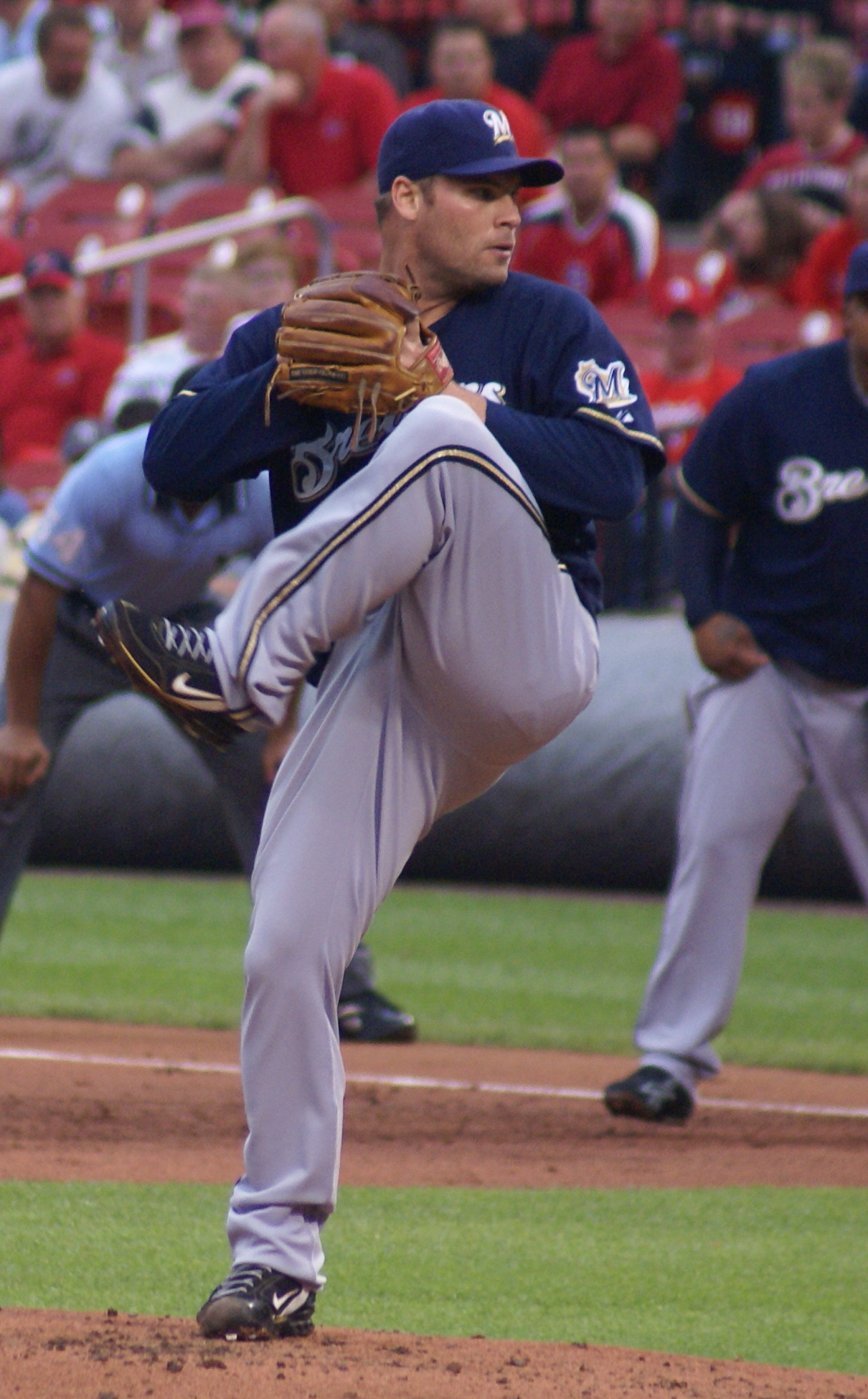
Ben Sheets made six Opening Day starts for the Brewers, a franchise record.

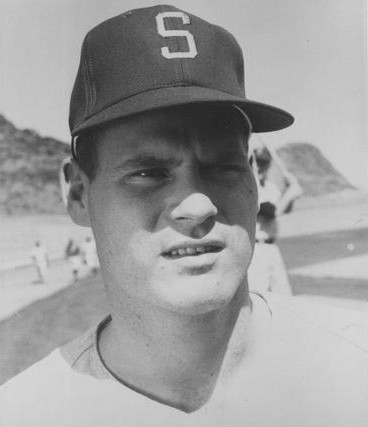
Marty Pattin was the starting pitcher for the Pilots' inaugural April 8, 1969, opener.

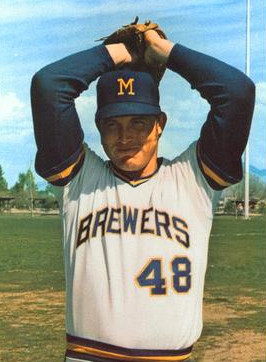
Jim Colborn, the Brewers' 1973 Opening Day starter, was selected for that season's All-Star Game.

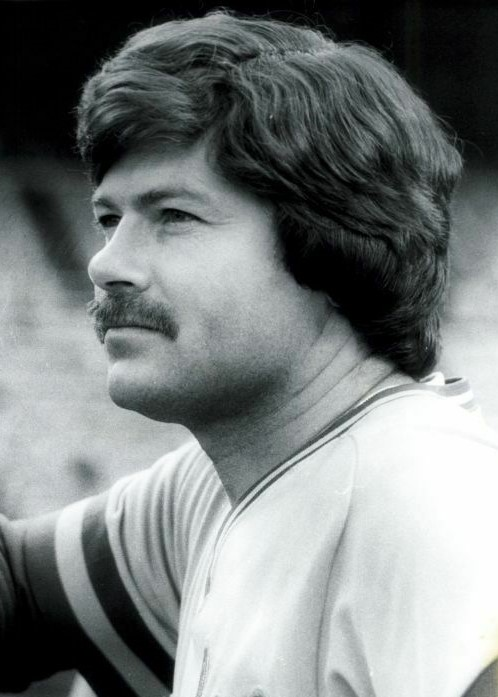
Jim Slaton made three Opening Day starts for the Brewers, including back-to-back starts in 1975 and 1976.

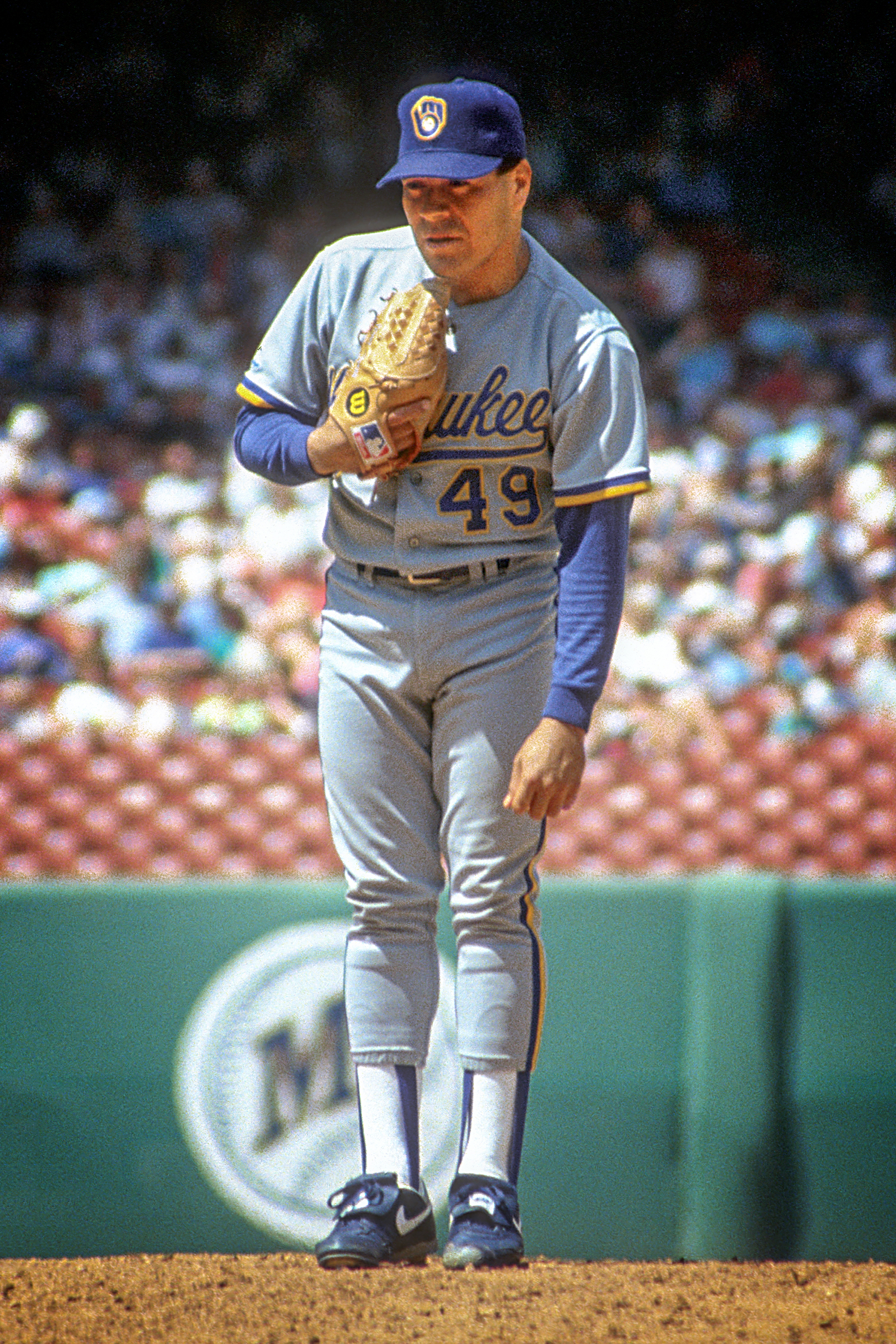
Teddy Higuera, won each of his three consecutive Opening Day starts from 1986 to 1988.

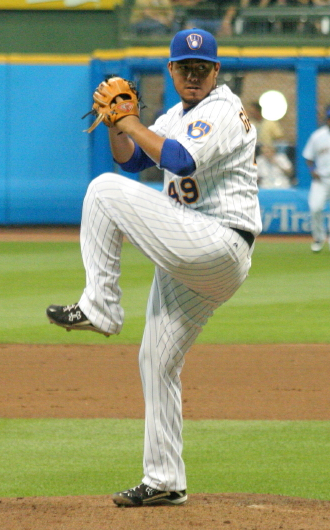
Yovani Gallardo made five consecutive Opening Day starts from 2010 to 2014, more than any other Brewer.

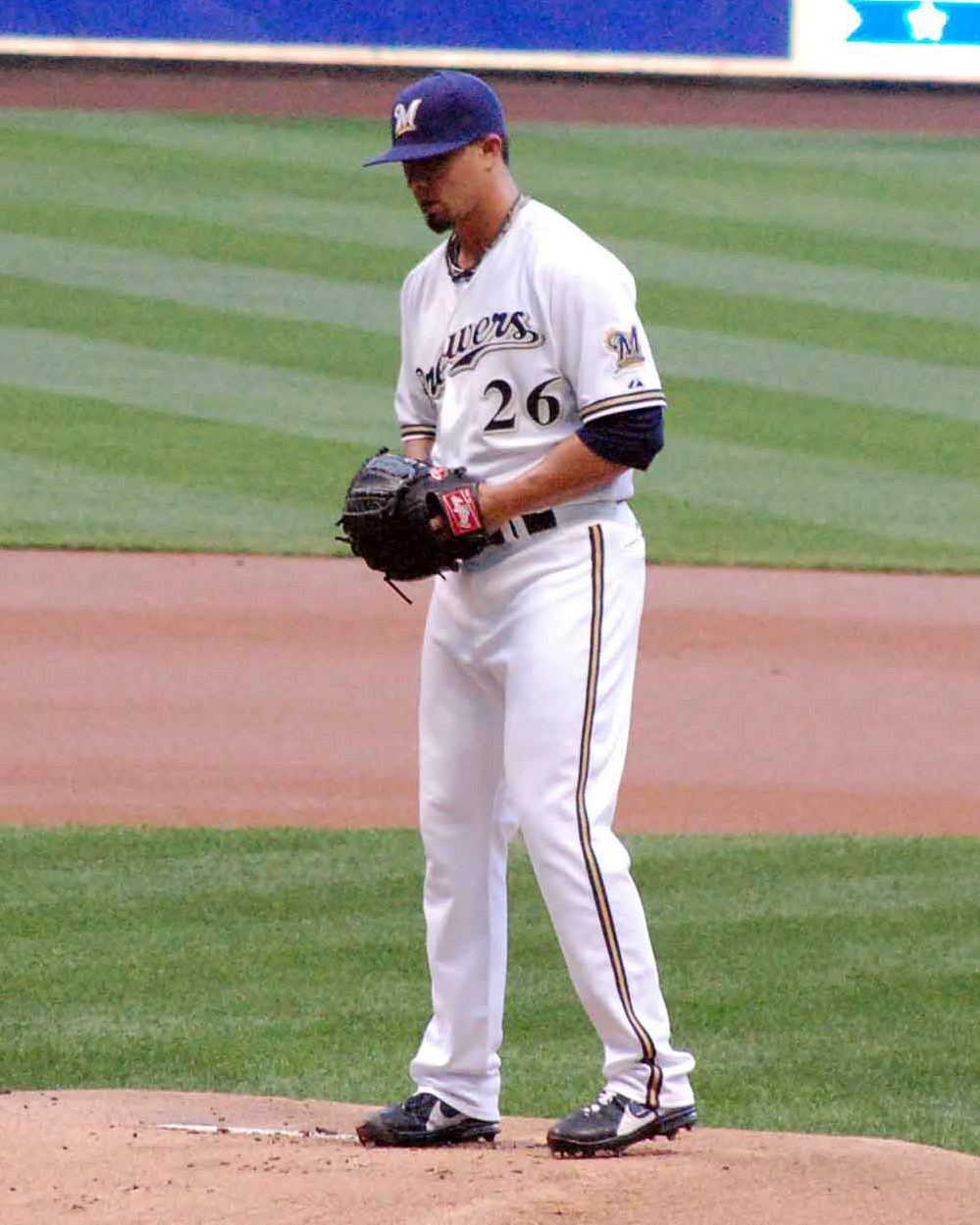
Kyle Lohse was the Brewers' 2015 Opening Day starter.

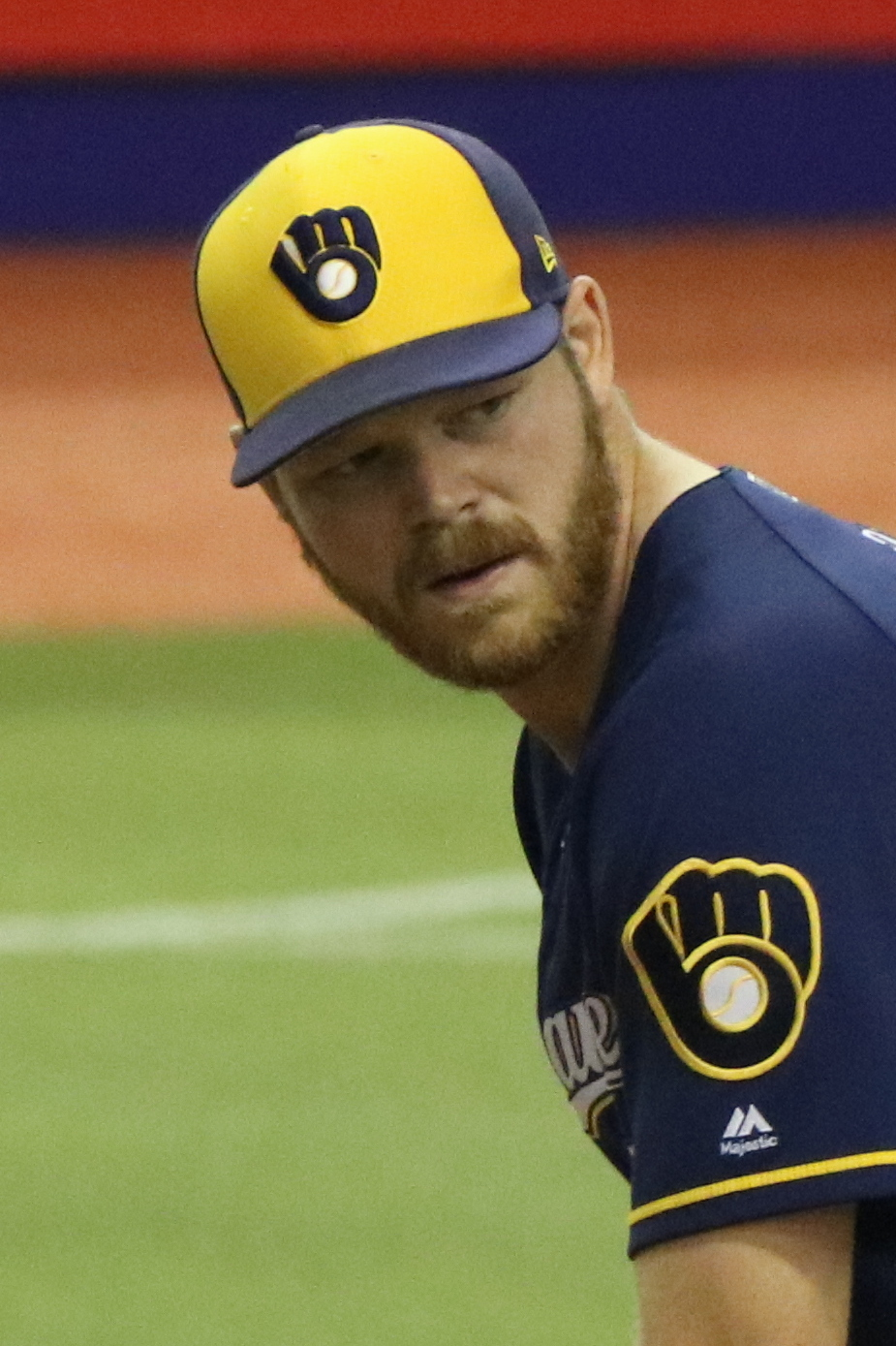
Brandon Woodruff was the Brewers' Opening Day starter in 2020 and 2021.

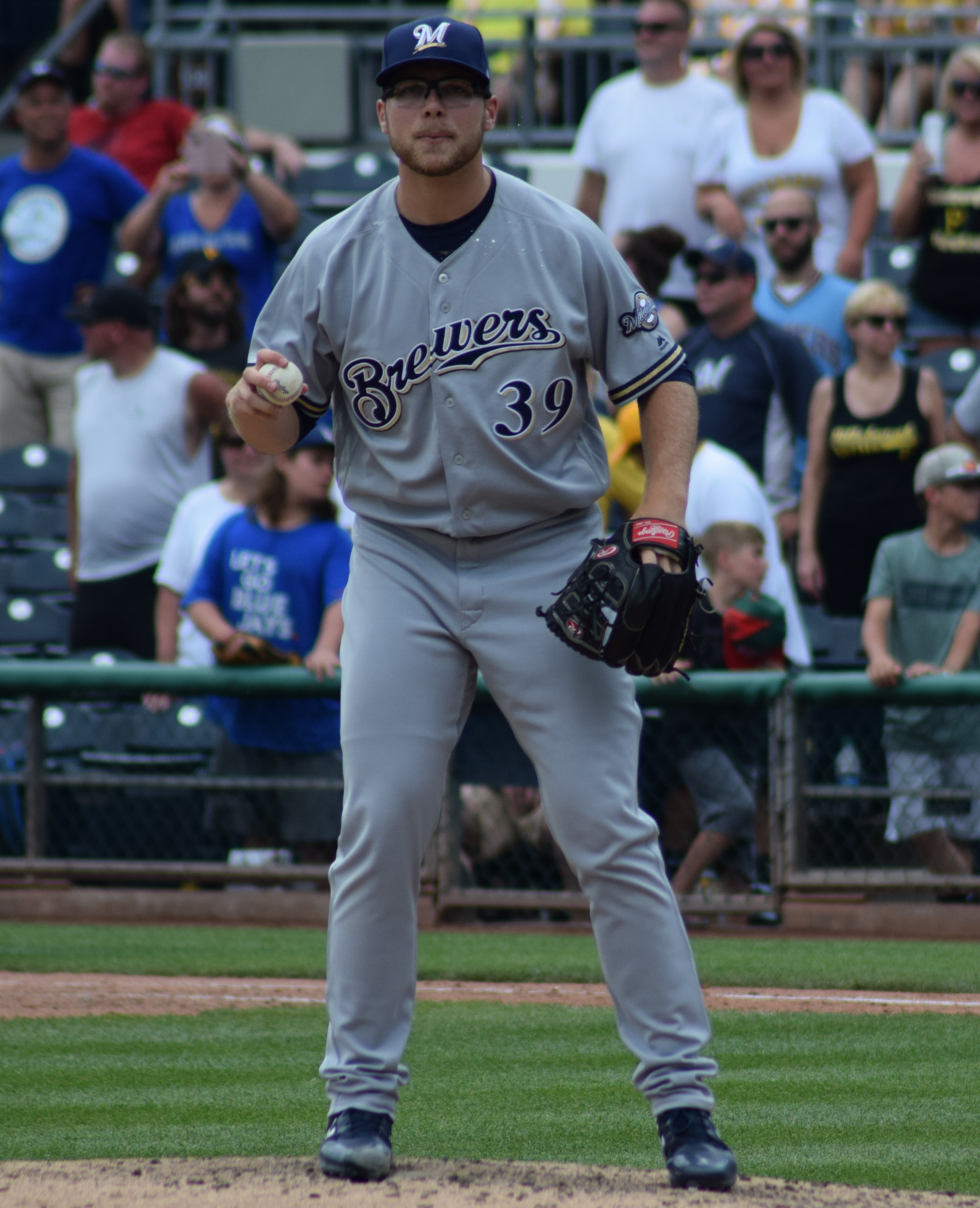
Corbin Burnes was selected as the Brewers' 2022 Opening Day starter after winning the 2021 NL Cy Young Award.

The Milwaukee Brewers are a Major League Baseball team based in Milwaukee, Wisconsin. They play in the National League Central division. Established in Seattle, Washington, as the Seattle Pilots in 1969, the team became the Milwaukee Brewers after relocating to Milwaukee in 1970. The first game of the new baseball season for a team is played on Opening Day, and being named the Opening Day starting pitcher is an honor which is given to the player who is expected to lead the pitching staff that season, though there are various strategic reasons why a team's best pitcher might not start on Opening Day. The Brewers have used 34 different Opening Day starting pitchers in their 57 seasons.

The Pilots, whose home ballpark was Sick's Stadium, played their inaugural Opening Day game on the road against the California Angels at Anaheim Stadium in Anaheim, California, on April 8, 1969. Marty Pattin was their starting pitcher that day; he earned the win in a game the Pilots won, 4–3. In 1970, the team relocated to Wisconsin and began playing their home games at Milwaukee County Stadium. The Brewers opened their first season in Milwaukee at home with Opening Day starter Lew Krausse Jr. taking the loss in a 12–0 defeat by the California Angels on April 9. County Stadium was home to the Brewers for 31 seasons through 2000. Their final Opening Day game at the facility occurred on April 26, 1995. Starter Ricky Bones took a no decision in the Brewers' 12–3 win over the Chicago White Sox. Steve Woodard received an unusual no decision in 2000, when the team's Opening Day game against the Cincinnati Reds was called in the sixth inning due to rain, with the score tied at 3. The team moved into American Family Field, then known as Miller Park, in 2001, but they did not play their first Opening Day game at the new stadium until five years later. In that game, held on April 3, 2006, Milwaukee defeated the Pittsburgh Pirates, 5–2; starter Doug Davis did not figure in the decision.

The Brewers' 34 Opening Day starting pitchers have a combined Opening Day record of 18 wins, 18 losses, and 21 no decisions in 57 Opening Day starts. They earned a win in their only Opening Day start in Seattle. In Milwaukee, they have 17 wins, 18 losses, and 21 no decisions in 56 Opening Day starts. At Milwaukee County Stadium, they had a record of 3 wins, 2 losses, and 5 no decisions in 10 Opening Days. At American Family Field, they have a record of 3 wins, 4 losses, and 5 no decisions in 12 Opening Days. The Brewers have an aggregate record of 6 wins, 6 losses, and 9 no decisions in 21 Opening Day starts played at home. Milwaukee's starters have a record of 12 wins, 12 losses, and 12 no decisions in 36 Opening Day starts on the road.

Ben Sheets has the most Opening Day starts for the Brewers, with six, followed by Yovani Gallardo (5); Teddy Higuera and Jim Slaton (3); and Ricky Bones, Corbin Burnes, Mike Caldwell, Jim Colborn, Cal Eldred, Marty Pattin, Freddy Peralta, Don Sutton, Bill Wegman, and Brandon Woodruff (2). Gallardo (2010–2014) made five consecutive Opening Day starts. Sheets (2002–2005) made four consecutive starts, while Higuera (1986–1988) made three and Bones (1995–1996), Burnes (2022–2023), Colborn (1973–1974), Peralta (2024–2025), Sheets (2007–2008), Slaton (1975–1976), Sutton (1983–1984), Wegman (1992–1993), and Woodruff (2020–2021) made back-to-back starts.

== Opening Day results ==
Table key
Season	Each year is linked to an article about that particular Brewers season.
Pitcher (#)	Number indicates multiple appearances as a Brewers Opening Day starter
Score (#)	Game score with Brewers runs listed first; number of innings in a game that was shorter or longer than 9 innings in parentheses
Location	Stadium in italics denotes a Brewers home game
W	Win
L	Loss
ND (W)	No decision by starting pitcher; Brewers won game
ND (L)	No decision by starting pitcher; Brewers lost game
*	Advanced to the postseason
**	Won the League Championship Series
†	World Series Champions

Pitchers
Season	Pitcher	Decision	Score	Opponent	Location	Ref.
1969	Marty Pattin	W	4–3	California Angels	Anaheim Stadium	
1970	Lew Krausse Jr.	L	0–12	California Angels	Milwaukee County Stadium	
1971	Marty Pattin (2)	W	7–2	Minnesota Twins	Metropolitan Stadium	
1972	Bill Parsons	W	5–1	Cleveland Indians	Cleveland Stadium	
1973	Jim Colborn	L	0–10	Baltimore Orioles	Memorial Stadium	
1974	Jim Colborn (2)	ND (L)	8–9	Boston Red Sox	Milwaukee County Stadium	
1975	Jim Slaton	L	2–5	Boston Red Sox	Fenway Park	
1976	Jim Slaton (2)	W	5–0	New York Yankees	Milwaukee County Stadium	
1977	Bill Travers	L	0–3	New York Yankees	Yankee Stadium	
1978	Jerry Augustine	W	11–3	Baltimore Orioles	Milwaukee County Stadium	
1979	Mike Caldwell	W	5–1	New York Yankees	Yankee Stadium	
1980	Jim Slaton (3)	ND (W)	9–5	Boston Red Sox	Milwaukee County Stadium	
1981*	Mike Caldwell (2)	W	5–3	Cleveland Indians	Cleveland Stadium	
1982**	Pete Vuckovich	W	15–4	Toronto Blue Jays	Exhibition Stadium	
1983	Don Sutton	L	2–3	California Angels	Anaheim Stadium	
1984	Don Sutton (2)	ND (L)	5–6	Oakland Athletics	Oakland–Alameda County Coliseum	
1985	Moose Haas	L	2–4	Chicago White Sox	Milwaukee County Stadium	
1986	Teddy Higuera	W	5–3	Chicago White Sox	Comiskey Park	
1987	Teddy Higuera (2)	W	5–1	Boston Red Sox	Milwaukee County Stadium	
1988	Teddy Higuera (3)	W	12–0	Baltimore Orioles	Memorial Stadium	
1989	Don August	L	1–2	Cleveland Indians	Cleveland Stadium	
1990	Chris Bosio	ND (L)	1–2	Chicago White Sox	Comiskey Park	
1991	Mark Knudson	W	5–4	Texas Rangers	Arlington Stadium	
1992	Bill Wegman	ND (L)	2–4	Minnesota Twins	Milwaukee County Stadium	
1993	Bill Wegman (2)	L	1–3	California Angels	Anaheim Stadium	
1994	Cal Eldred	ND (W)	11–7	Oakland Athletics	Milwaukee County Stadium	
1995	Ricky Bones	ND (W)	12–3	Chicago White Sox	Milwaukee County Stadium	
1996	Ricky Bones (2)	ND (W)	15–9	California Angels	Anaheim Stadium	
1997	Ben McDonald	L	2–6	Texas Rangers	The Ballpark in Arlington	
1998	Cal Eldred (2)	ND (L)	1–2	Atlanta Braves	Turner Field	
1999	Rafael Roque	ND (W)	10–8	St. Louis Cardinals	Busch Stadium	
2000	Steve Woodard	ND (Tie)	3–3 (6)	Cincinnati Reds	Cinergy Field	
2001	Jamey Wright	L	0–1	Los Angeles Dodgers	Dodger Stadium	
2002	Ben Sheets	W	9–3	Houston Astros	Astros Field	
2003	Ben Sheets (2)	ND (L)	9–11	St. Louis Cardinals	Busch Stadium	
2004	Ben Sheets (3)	ND (W)	8–6	St. Louis Cardinals	Busch Stadium	
2005	Ben Sheets (4)	W	9–2	Pittsburgh Pirates	PNC Park	
2006	Doug Davis	ND (W)	5–2	Pittsburgh Pirates	Miller Park	
2007	Ben Sheets (5)	W	7–1	Los Angeles Dodgers	Miller Park	
2008*	Ben Sheets (6)	ND (W)	4–3 (10)	Chicago Cubs	Wrigley Field	
2009	Jeff Suppan	L	6–10	San Francisco Giants	AT&T Park	
2010	Yovani Gallardo	L	3–5	Colorado Rockies	Miller Park	
2011*	Yovani Gallardo (2)	ND (L)	6–7	Cincinnati Reds	Great American Ball Park	
2012	Yovani Gallardo (3)	L	5–11	St. Louis Cardinals	Miller Park	
2013	Yovani Gallardo (4)	ND (W)	5–4 (10)	Colorado Rockies	Miller Park	
2014	Yovani Gallardo (5)	W	2–0	Atlanta Braves	Miller Park	
2015	Kyle Lohse	L	0–10	Colorado Rockies	Miller Park	
2016	Wily Peralta	L	3–12	San Francisco Giants	Miller Park	
2017	Junior Guerra	ND (L)	5–7	Colorado Rockies	Miller Park	
2018*	Chase Anderson	ND (W)	2–1 (12)	San Diego Padres	Petco Park	
2019*	Jhoulys Chacín	W	5–4	St. Louis Cardinals	Miller Park	
2020*	Brandon Woodruff	L	0–3	Chicago Cubs	Wrigley Field	
2021*	Brandon Woodruff (2)	ND (W)	6–5 (10)	Minnesota Twins	American Family Field	
2022	Corbin Burnes	ND (L)	4–5	Chicago Cubs	Wrigley Field	
2023*	Corbin Burnes (2)	L	0–4	Chicago Cubs	Wrigley Field	
2024*	Freddy Peralta	W	3–1	New York Mets	Citi Field	
2025*	Freddy Peralta (2)	L	2–4	New York Yankees	Yankee Stadium	
2026†	Jacob Misiorowski	W	14–2	Chicago White Sox	American Family Field	

== Pitchers ==
Opening Day starting pitchers are listed in descending order by the number of Opening Day starts for the Brewers.

Pitcher	Starts	Wins	Losses	No decisions	Win %	Season(s)
Ben Sheets	6	3	0	3	1.000	2002, 2003, 2004, 2005, 2007, 2008
Yovani Gallardo	5	1	2	2	0.333	2010, 2011, 2012, 2013, 2014
Teddy Higuera	3	3	0	0	1.000	1986, 1987, 1988
Jim Slaton	3	1	1	1	0.500	1975, 1976, 1980
Mike Caldwell	2	2	0	0	1.000	1979, 1981
Marty Pattin	2	2	0	0	1.000	1969, 1971
Freddy Peralta	2	1	1	0	.500	2024, 2025
Ricky Bones	2	0	0	2	0.000	1995, 1996
Jim Colborn	2	0	1	1	0.000	1973, 1974
Cal Eldred	2	0	0	2	0.000	1994, 1998
Corbin Burnes	2	0	1	1	0.000	2022, 2023
Don Sutton	2	0	1	1	0.000	1983, 1984
Bill Wegman	2	0	1	1	0.000	1992, 1993
Brandon Woodruff	2	0	1	1	0.000	2020, 2021
Jerry Augustine	1	1	0	0	1.000	1978
Jhoulys Chacín	1	1	0	0	1.000	2019
Mark Knudson	1	1	0	0	1.000	1991
Bill Parsons	1	1	0	0	1.000	1972
Pete Vuckovich	1	1	0	0	1.000	1982
Chase Anderson	1	0	0	1	0.000	2018
Don August	1	0	1	0	0.000	1989
Chris Bosio	1	0	0	1	0.000	1990
Doug Davis	1	0	0	1	0.000	2006
Junior Guerra	1	0	0	1	0.000	2017
Moose Haas	1	0	1	0	0.000	1985
Lew Krausse Jr.	1	0	1	0	0.000	1970
Kyle Lohse	1	0	1	0	0.000	2015
Ben McDonald	1	0	1	0	0.000	1997
Wily Peralta	1	0	1	0	0.000	2016
Rafael Roque	1	0	0	1	0.000	1999
Jeff Suppan	1	0	1	0	0.000	2009
Bill Travers	1	0	1	0	0.000	1977
Steve Woodard	1	0	0	1	0.000	2000
Jamey Wright	1	0	1	0	0.000	2001
