= 1979 Milwaukee Brewers season =

1979 Milwaukee Brewers
- League: American League
- Division: East
- Ballpark: Milwaukee County Stadium
- City: Milwaukee, Wisconsin, United States
- Record: 95–66 (.590)
- Divisional place: 2nd
- Owners: Bud Selig
- General managers: Harry Dalton
- Managers: George Bamberger
- Television: WTMJ-TV (Merle Harmon, Bob Uecker, Mike Hegan)
- Radio: 620 WTMJ (Merle Harmon, Bob Uecker)
- Stats: ESPN.com; Baseball Reference

The 1979 Milwaukee Brewers season was the 10th season for the Brewers in Milwaukee, and their 11th overall. The Brewers finished second in the American League East with a record of 95 wins and 66 losses. They scored at least one run in each of their first 160 games of the season, and were shutout (losing 5–0 to Minnesota) only in the 161st game which was to be their last game of the season.

== Offseason ==
- December 21, 1978: Steve Lake was purchased from the Orioles by the Milwaukee Brewers.
- February 26, 1979: Eduardo Rodríguez was purchased from the Brewers by the Kansas City Royals.
- March 6, 1979: Vic Harris was signed as a free agent by the Brewers.
- March 28, 1979: Gary Beare was traded by the Brewers to the Philadelphia Phillies for Dan Boitano.

== Regular season ==
Gorman Thomas enjoyed his best season in the majors, compiling career high numbers in home runs (45, tops in the AL), RBI (123), runs scored (97), hits (136), doubles (29), walks (98), on-base percentage (.356), total bases (300), slugging average (.539) and OPS (.895).

=== Season standings ===
AL East
Team	W	L	Pct.	GB	Home	Road
Baltimore Orioles	102	57	.642	—	55‍–‍24	47‍–‍33
Milwaukee Brewers	95	66	.590	8	52‍–‍29	43‍–‍37
Boston Red Sox	91	69	.569	11½	51‍–‍29	40‍–‍40
New York Yankees	89	71	.556	13½	51‍–‍30	38‍–‍41
Detroit Tigers	85	76	.528	18	46‍–‍34	39‍–‍42
Cleveland Indians	81	80	.503	22	47‍–‍34	34‍–‍46
Toronto Blue Jays	53	109	.327	50½	32‍–‍49	21‍–‍60

=== Record vs. opponents ===
1979 American League record Sources:
Team	BAL	BOS	CAL	CWS	CLE	DET	KC	MIL	MIN	NYY	OAK	SEA	TEX	TOR
Baltimore	—	8–5	9–3	8–3	8–5	7–6	6–6	8–5	8–4	5–6	8–4	10–2	6–6	11–2
Boston	5–8	—	5–7	5–6	6–7	8–5	8–4	8–4	9–3	5–8	9–3	8–4	6–6	9–4
California	3–9	7–5	—	9–4	6–6	4–8	7–6	7–5	9–4	7–5	10–3	7–6	5–8	7–5
Chicago	3–8	6–5	4–9	—	6–6	3–9	5–8	5–7	5–8	4–8	9–4	5–8	11–2	7–5
Cleveland	5–8	7–6	6–6	6–6	—	6–6	6–6	4–9	8–4	5–8	8–4	7–5	5–7	8–5
Detroit	6–7	5–8	8–4	9–3	6–6	—	5–7	6–7	4–8	7–6	7–5	7–5	6–6	9–4
Kansas City	6–6	4–8	6–7	8–5	6–6	7–5	—	5–7	7–6	5–7	9–4	7–6	6–7	9–3
Milwaukee	5–8	4–8	5–7	7–5	9–4	7–6	7–5	—	8–4	9–4	6–6	9–3	9–3	10–3
Minnesota	4–8	3–9	4–9	8–5	4–8	8–4	6–7	4–8	—	7–5	9–4	10–3	4–9	11–1
New York	6–5	8–5	5–7	8–4	8–5	6–7	7–5	4–9	5–7	—	9–3	6–6	8–4	9–4
Oakland	4–8	3–9	3–10	4–9	4–8	5–7	4–9	6–6	4–9	3–9	—	8–5	2–11	4–8
Seattle	2–10	4–8	6–7	8–5	5–7	5–7	6–7	3–9	3–10	6–6	5–8	—	6–7	8–4
Texas	6–6	6–6	8–5	2–11	7–5	6–6	7–6	3–9	9–4	4–8	11–2	7–6	—	7–5
Toronto	2–11	4–9	5–7	5–7	5–8	4–9	3–9	3–10	1–11	4–9	8–4	4–8	5–7	—

=== Opening Day starters ===
- Sal Bando
- Mike Caldwell
- Cecil Cooper
- Larry Hisle
- Sixto Lezcano
- Don Money
- Charlie Moore
- Ben Oglivie
- Gorman Thomas
- Robin Yount

=== Notable transactions ===
- June 7, 1979: Randy Stein was traded by the Brewers to the Seattle Mariners for Paul Mitchell.

=== Roster ===
1979 Milwaukee Brewers
Roster
Pitchers: 46 Jerry Augustine; 34 Dan Boitano; 48 Mike Caldwell; 35 Bill Castro; 23,47 Reggie Cleveland; 18,45 Bob Galasso; 30 Moose Haas; 10 Bob McClure; 43 Paul Mitchell; 29 Lance Rautzhan; 27 Andy Replogle; 41 Jim Slaton; 39 Lary Sorensen; 25 Bill Travers	Catchers: 13 Ray Fosse; 21 Buck Martinez; 22 Charlie Moore; Infielders: 6 Sal Bando; 15 Cecil Cooper; 17 Jim Gantner; 4 Paul Molitor; 7 Don Money; 1 Tim Nordbrook; 2 Lenn Sakata; 19 Robin Yount	Outfielders: 26 Dick Davis; 9 Larry Hisle; 16 Sixto Lezcano; 24 Ben Oglivie; 20 Gorman Thomas; 14 Jim Wohlford	Manager: 31 George Bamberger; Coaches: 12 Larry Haney (Bullpen); 33 Frank Howard (First base); 32 Harvey Kuenn (Hitting); 38 Cal McLish (Pitching); 37 Buck Rodgers (Third base)

== Player stats ==
=== Batting ===
==== Starters by position ====
Note: Pos = Position; G = Games played; AB = At bats; H = Hits; Avg. = Batting average; HR = Home runs; RBI = Runs batted in

Pos	Player	G	AB	H	Avg.	HR	RBI
C	Charlie Moore	111	337	101	.300	5	38
1B	Cecil Cooper	150	590	182	.308	24	106
2B	Paul Molitor	140	584	188	.322	9	62
SS	Robin Yount	149	577	154	.267	8	51
3B	Sal Bando	130	476	117	.246	9	43
LF	Ben Oglivie	139	514	145	.282	29	81
CF	Gorman Thomas	156	557	136	.244	45	123
RF	Sixto Lezcano	138	473	152	.321	28	101
DH	Dick Davis	91	335	89	.266	12	41

==== Other batters ====
Note: G = Games played; AB = At bats; H = Hits; Avg. = Batting average; HR = Home runs; RBI = Runs batted in

Player	G	AB	H	Avg.	HR	RBI
Don Money	92	350	83	.237	6	38
Jim Gantner	70	208	59	.284	2	22
Buck Martinez	69	196	53	.270	4	26
Jim Wohlford	63	175	46	.263	1	17
Larry Hisle	26	96	27	.281	3	14
Ray Fosse	19	52	12	.231	0	2
Lenn Sakata	4	14	7	.500	0	1
Tim Nordbrook	2	2	1	.500	0	0

=== Pitching ===
==== Starting pitchers ====
Note: G = Games pitched; IP = Innings pitched; W = Wins; L = Losses; ERA = Earned run average; SO = Strikeouts

Player	G	IP	W	L	ERA	SO
Lary Sorensen	34	235.1	15	14	3.98	63
Mike Caldwell	30	235.0	16	6	3.29	89
Jim Slaton	32	213.0	15	9	3.63	80
Bill Travers	30	187.1	14	8	3.89	74
Moose Haas	29	184.2	11	11	4.78	95

==== Other pitchers ====
Note: G = Games pitched; IP = Innings pitched; W = Wins; L = Losses; ERA = Earned run average; SO = Strikeouts

Player	G	IP	W	L	ERA	SO
Paul Mitchell	18	75.0	3	3	5.76	32

==== Relief pitchers ====
Note: G = Games pitched; W = Wins; L = Losses; SV = Saves; ERA = Earned run average; SO = Strikeouts

Player	G	W	L	SV	ERA	SO
Bill Castro	39	3	1	6	2.03	10
Jerry Augustine	43	9	6	5	3.47	41
Bob McClure	36	5	2	5	3.88	37
Bob Galasso	31	3	1	3	4.38	28
Reggie Cleveland	29	1	5	4	6.71	22
Dan Boitano	5	0	0	0	1.50	5
Andy Replogle	3	0	0	0	5.63	2
Lance Rautzhan	3	0	0	0	9.00	2
Sal Bando	1	0	0	0	6.00	0
Jim Gantner	1	0	0	0	0.00	0
Buck Martinez	1	0	0	0	9.00	0

== Farm system ==
The Brewers' farm system consisted of five minor league affiliates in 1979.

Level	Team	League	Manager
Triple-A	Vancouver Canadians	Pacific Coast League	John Felske
Double-A	Holyoke Millers	Eastern League	George Farson
Class A	Stockton Ports	California League	Lee Sigman
Class A	Burlington Bees	Midwest League	Duane Espy
Rookie	Butte Copper Kings	Pioneer League	Ken Richardson and Tom Gamboa
