= 1978 Milwaukee Brewers season =

1978 Milwaukee Brewers
- League: American League
- Division: East
- Ballpark: Milwaukee County Stadium
- City: Milwaukee, Wisconsin, United States
- Record: 93–69 (.574)
- Divisional place: 3rd
- Owners: Bud Selig
- General managers: Harry Dalton
- Managers: George Bamberger
- Television: WTMJ-TV (Merle Harmon, Bob Uecker, Mike Hegan)
- Radio: 620 WTMJ (Merle Harmon, Bob Uecker)
- Stats: ESPN.com; Baseball Reference

The 1978 Milwaukee Brewers season was the 9th season for the Brewers in Milwaukee, having relocated from Seattle in March 1970. The Brewers finished third in the American League East with a record of 93 wins and 69 losses. The Brewers achieved their first winning season in franchise history, nine in Milwaukee after the first (1969) as the Seattle Pilots.

== Offseason ==
- October 25, 1977: Gorman Thomas was sent by the Brewers to the Texas Rangers to complete an earlier deal (the Rangers traded Ed Kirkpatrick to the Brewers for a player to be named later) made on August 20.
- December 6, 1977: Kevin Kobel was purchased from the Brewers by the New York Mets.
- December 14, 1977: Ken McMullen was released by the Brewers.
- December 31, 1977: Ray Fosse was signed as a free agent by the Brewers.
- January 16, 1978: Randy Stein was signed as a free agent by the Brewers.
- February 8, 1978: Gorman Thomas was purchased by the Brewers from the Rangers.
- March 30, 1978: Von Joshua was released by the Brewers.

== Regular season ==
=== Opening Day starters ===
- Jerry Augustine
- Sal Bando
- Cecil Cooper
- Andy Etchebarren
- Larry Hisle
- Sixto Lezcano
- Paul Molitor
- Don Money
- Lenn Sakata
- Gorman Thomas

=== Season standings ===
AL East
| Team | W | L | Pct. | GB | Home | Road |
|---|---|---|---|---|---|---|
| New York Yankees | 100 | 63 | .613 | — | 55‍–‍26 | 45‍–‍37 |
| Boston Red Sox | 99 | 64 | .607 | 1 | 59‍–‍23 | 40‍–‍41 |
| Milwaukee Brewers | 93 | 69 | .574 | 6½ | 54‍–‍27 | 39‍–‍42 |
| Baltimore Orioles | 90 | 71 | .559 | 9 | 51‍–‍30 | 39‍–‍41 |
| Detroit Tigers | 86 | 76 | .531 | 13½ | 47‍–‍34 | 39‍–‍42 |
| Cleveland Indians | 69 | 90 | .434 | 29 | 42‍–‍36 | 27‍–‍54 |
| Toronto Blue Jays | 59 | 102 | .366 | 40 | 37‍–‍44 | 22‍–‍58 |

=== Record vs. opponents ===
1978 American League record Sources:
| Team | BAL | BOS | CAL | CWS | CLE | DET | KC | MIL | MIN | NYY | OAK | SEA | TEX | TOR |
|---|---|---|---|---|---|---|---|---|---|---|---|---|---|---|
| Baltimore | — | 7–8 | 4–6 | 8–1 | 9–6 | 7–8 | 2–8 | 7–8 | 5–5 | 6–9 | 11–0 | 9–1 | 7–4 | 8–7 |
| Boston | 8–7 | — | 9–2 | 7–3 | 7–8 | 12–3 | 4–6 | 10–5 | 9–2 | 7–9 | 5–5 | 7–3 | 3–7 | 11–4 |
| California | 6–4 | 2–9 | — | 8–7 | 6–4 | 4–7 | 9–6 | 5–5 | 12–3 | 5–5 | 9–6 | 9–6 | 5–10 | 7–3 |
| Chicago | 1–8 | 3–7 | 7–8 | — | 8–2 | 2–9 | 8–7 | 4–7 | 8–7 | 1–9 | 7–8 | 7–8 | 11–4 | 4–6 |
| Cleveland | 6–9 | 8–7 | 4–6 | 2–8 | — | 5–10 | 5–6 | 5–10 | 5–5 | 6–9 | 4–6 | 8–1 | 1–9 | 10–4 |
| Detroit | 8–7 | 3–12 | 7–4 | 9–2 | 10–5 | — | 4–6 | 7–8 | 4–6 | 4–11 | 6–4 | 8–2 | 7–3 | 9–6 |
| Kansas City | 8–2 | 6–4 | 6–9 | 7–8 | 6–5 | 6–4 | — | 6–4 | 7–8 | 6–5 | 10–5 | 12–3 | 7–8 | 5–5 |
| Milwaukee | 8–7 | 5–10 | 5–5 | 7–4 | 10–5 | 8–7 | 4–6 | — | 4–7 | 10–5 | 9–1 | 5–5 | 6–4 | 12–3 |
| Minnesota | 5–5 | 2–9 | 3–12 | 7–8 | 5–5 | 6–4 | 8–7 | 7–4 | — | 3–7 | 9–6 | 6–9 | 6–9 | 6–4 |
| New York | 9–6 | 9–7 | 5–5 | 9–1 | 9–6 | 11–4 | 5–6 | 5–10 | 7–3 | — | 8–2 | 6–5 | 6–4 | 11–4 |
| Oakland | 0–11 | 5–5 | 6–9 | 8–7 | 6–4 | 4–6 | 5–10 | 1–9 | 6–9 | 2–8 | — | 13–2 | 6–9 | 7–4 |
| Seattle | 1–9 | 3–7 | 6–9 | 8–7 | 1–8 | 2–8 | 3–12 | 5–5 | 9–6 | 5–6 | 2–13 | — | 3–12 | 8–2 |
| Texas | 4–7 | 7–3 | 10–5 | 4–11 | 9–1 | 3–7 | 8–7 | 4–6 | 9–6 | 4–6 | 9–6 | 12–3 | — | 4–7 |
| Toronto | 7–8 | 4–11 | 3–7 | 6–4 | 4–10 | 6–9 | 5–5 | 3–12 | 4–6 | 4–11 | 4–7 | 2–8 | 7–4 | — |

=== Notable transactions ===
- April 1, 1978: Bob Galasso was signed as a free agent by the Brewers.
- April 4, 1978: Tony Muser was signed as a free agent by the Brewers.
- June 6, 1978: Rickey Keeton was drafted by the Brewers in the 3rd round of the 1978 Major League Baseball draft.
- August 3, 1978: Jamie Quirk was traded by the Brewers to the Kansas City Royals for Gerry Ako (minors) and cash.

=== Roster ===
1978 Milwaukee Brewers
Roster
| Pitchers: 46 Jerry Augustine; 36 Mark Bomback; 48 Mike Caldwell; 35 Bill Castro; 47 Ed Farmer; 30 Moose Haas; 10 Bob McClure; 40 Willie Mueller; 27 Andy Replogle; 23 Eduardo Rodríguez; 39 Lary Sorensen; 43 Randy Stein; 25 Bill Travers | Catchers: 8 Andy Etchebarren; 12 Larry Haney; 21 Buck Martinez; 22 Charlie Moore; Infielders: 6 Sal Bando; 15 Cecil Cooper; 11 Jim Gantner; 1 Tim Johnson; 4 Paul Molitor; 7 Don Money; 5 Tony Muser; 1 Tim Nordbrook; 21 Lenn Sakata; 19 Robin Yount | Outfielders: 26 Dick Davis; 9 Larry Hisle; 16 Sixto Lezcano; 11 Dave May; 24 Ben Oglivie; 20 Gorman Thomas; 14 Jim Wohlford; 11 Jeff Yurak | Manager: 31 George Bamberger; Coaches: 12 Larry Haney (Bullpen); 33 Frank Howard (First base); 32 Harvey Kuenn (Hitting); 38 Cal McLish (Pitching); 37 Buck Rodgers (Third base) |

== Game log ==
=== Regular season ===
Legend
| | Brewers win |
| | Brewers loss |
| | Postponement |
| | Eliminated from playoff race |
| **Bold** | Brewers team member |

1978 regular season game log: 93–69 (Home: 54–27; Away: 39–42)
April: 9–11 (Home: 6–1; Away: 3–10)

| # | Date | Time (CT) | Opponent | Score | Win | Loss | Save | Time of Game | Attendance | Record | Streak |
|---|---|---|---|---|---|---|---|---|---|---|---|
| – | April 6 | | Orioles | Postponed (rain); Makeup: April 7 | | | | | | | |
| 1 | April 7 | | Orioles | 11–3 | **Augustine** (1–0) | Flanagan (0–1) | | | 47,824 | 1–0 | W1 |
| 2 | April 8 | | Orioles | 16–3 | **Haas** (1–0) | D. Martínez (0–1) | | | 6,470 | 2–0 | W2 |
| 3 | April 9 | | Orioles | 13–5 | **Sorensen** (1–0) | McGregor (0–1) | | | 18,514 | 3–0 | W3 |
| 4 | April 11 | 6:00 p.m. CST | Yankees | 9–6 | **Augustine** (2–0) | Hunter (0–1) | **Caldwell** (1) | 2:34 | 8,934 | 4–0 | W4 |
| 5 | April 12 | 1:30 p.m. CST | Yankees | 5–3 | **Haas** (2–0) | Gossage (0–2) | — | 2:18 | 8,751 | 5–0 | W5 |
| 6 | April 14 | | @ Orioles | 5–6 | D. Martínez (1–1) | **Sorensen** (1–1) | Stanhouse (1) | | 36,086 | 5–1 | L1 |
| 7 | April 15 | | @ Orioles | 0–7 | Palmer (1–0) | **Augustine** (2–1) | | | 7,527 | 5–2 | L2 |
| 8 | April 16 | | @ Orioles | 5–7 | Briles (1–1) | **Haas** (2–1) | Stanhouse (2) | | – | 5–3 | L3 |
| 9 | April 16 | | @ Orioles | 9–2 | **Replogle** (1–0) | McGregor (0–2) | **Rodríguez** (1) | | 14,995 | 6–3 | W1 |
| 10 | April 17 | | @ Red Sox | 2–9 | Torrez (2–0) | **Stein** (0–1) | | | 26,075 | 6–4 | L1 |
| 11 | April 18 | | @ Red Sox | 6–7 | Tiant (1–0) | **Rodríguez** (0–1) | | | 18,928 | 6–5 | L2 |
| – | April 19 | | @ Red Sox | Postponed (rain); Makeup: August 12 | | | | | | | |
| 12 | April 20 | | @ Red Sox | 4–10 | Lee (3–0) | **Haas** (2–2) | | | 16,238 | 6–6 | L3 |
| 13 | April 21 | 7:00 p.m. CST | @ Yankees | 9–2 | **Augustine** (3–1) | Figueroa (2–1) | — | 2:17 | 15,105 | 7–6 | W1 |
| 14 | April 22 | 1:20 p.m. CST | @ Yankees | 3–4 (12) | Lyle (2–0) | **McClure** (0–1) | — | 3:31 | 17,594 | 7–7 | L1 |
| 15 | April 23 | 1:00 p.m. CST | @ Yankees | 3–2 | **Sorensen** (2–1) | Hunter (0–3) | **McClure** (1) | 1:53 | 26,291 | 8–7 | W1 |
| 16 | April 25 | | Red Sox | 3–4 | Lee (4–0) | **Augustine** (3–2) | Drago (2) | | 9,051 | 8–8 | L1 |
| 17 | April 26 | | Red Sox | 6–4 | **Caldwell** (1–0) | Torrez (2–1) | **McClure** (2) | | 8,724 | 9–8 | W1 |
| 18 | April 28 | | @ Royals | 6–7 | Colborn (1–0) | **Rodríguez** (0–2) | Pattin (2) | | 20,166 | 9–9 | L1 |
| 19 | April 29 | | @ Royals | 2–11 | Leonard (3–3) | **Augustine** (3–3) | | | 27,521 | 9–10 | L2 |
| 20 | April 30 | | @ Royals | 0–3 | Gale (1–0) | **Caldwell** (1–1) | Mingori (3) | | 19,827 | 9–11 | L3 |

May: 14–11 (Home: 7–7; Away: 7–4)

| # | Date | Time (CT) | Opponent | Score | Win | Loss | Save | Time of Game | Attendance | Record | Streak |
|---|---|---|---|---|---|---|---|---|---|---|---|
| 21 | May 2 | | White Sox | 3–5 | Wood (2–3) | **Sorensen** (2–2) | | | 7,880 | 9–12 | L4 |
| 22 | May 3 | | White Sox | 4–0 | **Augustine** (4–3) | Wortham (0–1) | | | 5,720 | 10–12 | W1 |
| 23 | May 5 | | Royals | 9–0 | **Caldwell** (2–1) | Colborn (1–1) | | | 10,435 | 11–12 | W2 |
| 24 | May 6 | | Royals | 4–3 | **Sorensen** (3–2) | Bird (1–2) | | | 13,914 | 12–12 | W3 |
| 25 | May 7 | | Royals | 6–8 | Gale (2–0) | **Augustine** (4–4) | Mingori (4) | | 10,887 | 12–13 | L1 |
| 26 | May 9 | | Rangers | 1–7 | Jenkins (3–1) | **Caldwell** (2–2) | | | 4,790 | 12–14 | L2 |
| 27 | May 10 | | Rangers | 3–4 | Alexander (3–1) | **Sorensen** (3–3) | Cleveland (1) | | 6,528 | 12–15 | L3 |
| 28 | May 12 | | @ White Sox | 3–4 (5) | Wood (3–3) | **Augustine** (4–5) | Willoughby (1) | | 17,953 | 12–16 | L4 |
| 29 | May 13 | | @ White Sox | 6–1 | **Replogle** (2–0) | Stone (1–2) | | | 13,521 | 13–16 | W1 |
| 30 | May 14 | | @ White Sox | 5–4 | **Caldwell** (3–2) | Barrios (1–3) | | | 12,505 | 14–16 | W2 |
| 31 | May 15 | | @ Rangers | 6–8 | Jenkins (4–1) | **Travers** (0–1) | Cleveland (2) | | 11,622 | 14–17 | L1 |
| 32 | May 16 | | @ Rangers | 4–3 | **Sorensen** (4–3) | Alexander (3–2) | | | 11,351 | 15–17 | W1 |
| 33 | May 17 | | Tigers | 3–5 | Billingham (4–1) | **Augustine** (4–6) | Hiller (3) | | 10,004 | 15–18 | L1 |
| 34 | May 18 | | Tigers | 8–7 | **Castro** (1–0) | Foucault (1–3) | | | 15,217 | 16–18 | W1 |
| 35 | May 19 | | Angels | 1–7 | Tanana (7–1) | **Caldwell** (3–3) | | | 13,843 | 16–19 | L1 |
| 36 | May 20 | | Angels | 6–4 | **Travers** (1–1) | Brett (1–3) | **Castro** (1) | | 18,916 | 17–19 | W1 |
| 37 | May 21 | | Angels | 2–1 | **Sorensen** (5–3) | LaRoche (3–1) | | | 42,376 | 18–19 | W2 |
| 38 | May 23 | | @ Athletics | 3–2 | **Augustine** (5–6) | Keough (2–3) | | | 2,534 | 19–19 | W3 |
| 39 | May 24 | | @ Athletics | 7–1 | **Caldwell** (4–3) | Broberg (4–4) | | | 2,257 | 20–19 | W4 |
| 40 | May 26 | | @ Angels | 5–6 | Hartzell (1–3) | **Rodríguez** (0–3) | | | 19,277 | 20–20 | L1 |
| 41 | May 27 | | @ Angels | 4–2 | **Sorensen** (6–3) | Griffin (0–1) | | | 29,097 | 21–20 | W1 |
| 42 | May 28 | | @ Angels | 6–3 | **Replogle** (3–0) | Ryan (3–4) | **McClure** (3) | | 21,869 | 22–20 | W2 |
| 43 | May 29 | | Athletics | 2–6 | Broberg (5–4) | **Augustine** (5–7) | | | 18,665 | 22–21 | L1 |
| 44 | May 30 | | Athletics | 2–1 | **Caldwell** (5–3) | Sosa (4–1) | | | 8,322 | 23–21 | W1 |
| 45 | May 31 | | @ Tigers | 0–3 | Wilcox (4–2) | **Travers** (1–2) | | | 13,017 | 23–22 | L1 |

June: 21–9 (Home: 13–7; Away: 8–2)

| # | Date | Time (CT) | Opponent | Score | Win | Loss | Save | Time of Game | Attendance | Record | Streak |
|---|---|---|---|---|---|---|---|---|---|---|---|
| 46 | June 1 | | @ Tigers | 3–4 | Slaton (5–2) | **Sorensen** (6–4) | Hiller (6) | | 11,614 | 23–23 | L2 |
| 47 | June 2 | | Indians | 6–7 | Kern (5–1) | **McClure** (0–2) | | | 16,779 | 23–24 | L3 |
| 48 | June 3 | | Indians | 4–6 | Paxton (2–3) | **Augustine** (5–8) | Monge (1) | | 11,933 | 23–25 | L4 |
| 49 | June 4 | | Indians | 12–7 | **Stein** (1–1) | Wise (3–9) | | | – | 24–25 | W1 |
| 50 | June 4 | | Indians | 9–4 | **Travers** (2–2) | Hood (3–3) | **Castro** (2) | | 23,850 | 25–25 | W2 |
| 51 | June 6 | | Tigers | 5–1 | **Sorensen** (7–4) | Wilcox (4–3) | | | 13,022 | 26–25 | W3 |
| 52 | June 7 | | Tigers | 1–8 | Slaton (6–2) | **Replogle** (3–1) | | | 7,437 | 26–26 | L1 |
| 53 | June 9 | | Blue Jays | 3–2 (10) | **Caldwell** (6–3) | Murphy (2–2) | | | 9,959 | 27–26 | W1 |
| 54 | June 10 | | Blue Jays | 5–0 | **Travers** (3–2) | Garvin (2–5) | | | 25,889 | 28–26 | W2 |
| 55 | June 11 | | Blue Jays | 2–1 | **Sorensen** (8–4) | Underwood (2–7) | | | – | 29–26 | W3 |
| 56 | June 11 | | Blue Jays | 5–4 | **Stein** (2–1) | Murphy (2–3) | | | 21,568 | 30–26 | W4 |
| 57 | June 12 | | @ Tigers | 7–4 | **McClure** (1–2) | Wilcox (4–4) | | | 14,472 | 31–26 | W5 |
| 58 | June 13 | | @ Tigers | 7–2 | **Caldwell** (7–3) | Slaton (6–3) | | | 16,622 | 32–26 | W6 |
| 59 | June 14 | | @ Blue Jays | 7–5 | **Castro** (2–0) | Murphy (2–4) | | | – | 33–26 | W7 |
| 60 | June 14 | | @ Blue Jays | 5–0 | **Augustine** (6–8) | Garvin (2–6) | | | 28,346 | 34–26 | W8 |
| 61 | June 16 | | @ Indians | 8–6 (10) | **McClure** (2–2) | Kern (5–2) | **Castro** (3) | | 9,175 | 35–26 | W9 |
| 62 | June 17 | | @ Indians | 4–3 (12) | **Castro** (3–0) | Kern (5–3) | | | 16,923 | 36–26 | W10 |
| 63 | June 18 | | @ Indians | 0–3 | Waits (4–7) | **Caldwell** (7–4) | | | – | 36–27 | L1 |
| 64 | June 18 | | @ Indians | 4–1 | **Augustine** (7–8) | Paxton (3–4) | **Castro** (4) | | 20,140 | 37–27 | W1 |
| 65 | June 20 | | Orioles | 5–8 | McGregor (8–4) | **Travers** (3–3) | | | 22,640 | 37–28 | L1 |
| 66 | June 21 | | Orioles | 5–3 | **Sorensen** (9–4) | D. Martínez (6–4) | **Castro** (5) | | 21,732 | 38–28 | W1 |
| 67 | June 22 | | Orioles | 3–10 | Flanagan (11–4) | **Haas** (2–3) | | | 26,586 | 38–29 | L1 |
| 68 | June 23 | | Mariners | 0–3 | Abbott (3–4) | **Caldwell** (7–5) | | | 8,268 | 38–30 | L2 |
| 69 | June 24 | | Mariners | 5–0 | **Augustine** (8–8) | Colborn (1–6) | | | 20,820 | 39–30 | W1 |
| 70 | June 25 | | Mariners | 8–10 | Romo (4–2) | **Stein** (2–2) | Montague (1) | | 24,526 | 39–31 | L1 |
| 71 | June 26 | | Twins | 8–2 | **Sorensen** (10–4) | Serum (3–3) | | | 7,988 | 40–31 | W1 |
| 72 | June 27 | | Twins | 13–6 | **Replogle** (4–1) | Goltz (5–5) | | | 16,137 | 41–31 | W2 |
| 73 | June 28 (1) | 8:13 p.m. CDT | Yankees | 5–0 | **Caldwell** (8–5) | Tidrow (3–6) | — | 2:10 | — | 42–31 | W3 |
| 74 | June 28 (2) | 10:45 p.m. CDT | Yankees | 7–2 | **Augustine** (9–8) | McCall (0–1) | — | 2:00 | 39,283 | 43–31 | W4 |
| 75 | June 30 | | @ Mariners | 13–3 | **Travers** (4–3) | Parrott (1–1) | **Rodríguez** (2) | | 7,772 | 44–31 | W5 |

July: 15–12 (Home: 10–3; Away: 5–9)

| # | Date | Time (CT) | Opponent | Score | Win | Loss | Save | Time of Game | Attendance | Record | Streak |
|---|---|---|---|---|---|---|---|---|---|---|---|
| 76 | July 1 | | @ Mariners | 4–0 | **Sorensen** (11–4) | Mitchell (4–8) | | | 14,836 | 45–31 | W6 |
| 77 | July 2 | | @ Mariners | 3–4 (11) | Rawley (4–5) | **Castro** (3–1) | | | 9,904 | 45–32 | L1 |
| 78 | July 3 | | @ Twins | 2–7 | Erickson (9–5) | **Augustine** (9–9) | | | 19,062 | 45–33 | L2 |
| 79 | July 4 | | @ Twins | 2–7 | Serum (4–3) | **Travers** (4–4) | | | 26,263 | 45–34 | L3 |
| 80 | July 5 | | @ Twins | 1–3 | Goltz (7–5) | **Sorensen** (11–5) | | | 11,409 | 45–35 | L4 |
| 81 | July 7 | 7:30 p.m. CDT | Yankees | 6–0 | **Caldwell** (9–5) | Guidry (13–1) | — | 1:59 | 40,216 | 46–35 | W1 |
| 82 | July 8 | 7:30 p.m. CDT | Yankees | 6–5 | **Rodríguez** (1–3) | Gossage (4–8) | **McClure** (4) | 2:21 | 46,518 | 47–35 | W2 |
| 83 | July 9 | 4:10 p.m. CDT | Yankees | 8–4 | **Travers** (5–4) | Gullett (4–2) | **Stein** (1) | 2:27 | 42,633 | 48–35 | W3 |
| ASG | July 11 | 8:00 p.m. CDT | AL @ NL | 3–7 | Sutter (1–0) | Gossage (0–1) | — | 2:38 | 51,549 | — | ASG |
| 84 | July 13 | | Royals | 13–2 | **Caldwell** (10–5) | Splittorff (10–8) | | | 16,706 | 49–35 | W4 |
| 85 | July 14 | | Royals | 2–9 | Gale (10–3) | **Replogle** (4–2) | | | 43,993 | 49–36 | L1 |
| 86 | July 15 | | White Sox | 3–1 | **Sorensen** (12–5) | Schueler (3–4) | | | 41,379 | 50–36 | W1 |
| 87 | July 16 | | White Sox | 10–1 | **Travers** (6–4) | Stone (7–7) | | | 33,862 | 51–36 | W2 |
| 88 | July 17 | | White Sox | 6–1 | **Caldwell** (11–5) | Barrios (5–9) | | | 15,993 | 52–36 | W3 |
| 89 | July 18 | | White Sox | 7–2 | **Augustine** (10–9) | Wood (10–6) | | | 17,660 | 53–36 | W4 |
| 90 | July 19 | | Red Sox | 2–8 | Torrez (12–5) | **Sorensen** (12–6) | | | 45,332 | 53–37 | L1 |
| 91 | July 20 | | Red Sox | 8–6 | **Rodríguez** (2–3) | Lee (10–4) | **McClure** (5) | | 35,044 | 54–37 | W1 |
| 92 | July 21 | | @ Rangers | 4–3 | **Travers** (7–4) | Medich (4–5) | **McClure** (6) | | 28,419 | 55–37 | W2 |
| 93 | July 22 | | @ Rangers | 2–1 (10) | **Caldwell** (12–5) | Cleveland (3–6) | | | 30,354 | 56–37 | W3 |
| 94 | July 23 | | @ Rangers | 17–8 | **Replogle** (5–2) | Comer (3–3) | | | 11,615 | 57–37 | W4 |
| 95 | July 24 | | @ White Sox | 1–5 | Stone (8–7) | **Sorensen** (12–7) | | | 11,091 | 57–38 | L1 |
| 96 | July 25 | | @ White Sox | 2–4 | Barrios (6–9) | **Rodríguez** (2–4) | Proly (1) | | 28,057 | 57–39 | L2 |
| 97 | July 26 | | Angels | 9–11 | Tanana (14–5) | **Travers** (7–5) | LaRoche (14) | | 21,584 | 57–40 | L3 |
| 98 | July 27 | | Angels | 6–3 | **Caldwell** (13–5) | Ryan (5–9) | | | 18,847 | 58–40 | W1 |
| 99 | July 28 | | @ Blue Jays | 2–3 (11) | Cruz (2–0) | **Castro** (3–2) | | | 17,060 | 58–41 | L1 |
| 100 | July 29 | | @ Blue Jays | 3–4 | Lemanczyk (4–12) | **Sorensen** (12–8) | Cruz (6) | | 25,037 | 58–42 | L2 |
| 101 | July 30 | | @ Blue Jays | 10–5 | **Stein** (3–2) | Murphy (4–8) | | | 21,511 | 59–42 | W1 |
| 102 | July 31 | | @ Orioles | 5–6 (10) | Kerrigan (3–0) | **Castro** (3–3) | | | 10,514 | 59–43 | L1 |

August: 17–14 (Home: 10–4; Away: 7–10)

| # | Date | Time (CT) | Opponent | Score | Win | Loss | Save | Time of Game | Attendance | Record | Streak |
|---|---|---|---|---|---|---|---|---|---|---|---|
| 103 | August 2 | | @ Orioles | 5–3 | **Caldwell** (14–5) | Palmer (13–9) | **Sorensen** (1) | | 10,663 | 60–43 | W1 |
| 104 | August 3 | | @ Orioles | 2–3 (10) | D. Martínez (8–8) | **Augustine** (10–10) | | | 9,654 | 60–44 | L1 |
| 105 | August 4 | | Red Sox | 6–2 | **Sorensen** (13–8) | Lee (10–7) | | | 52,562 | 61–44 | W1 |
| 106 | August 5 | | Red Sox | 1–8 | Eckersley (13–4) | **Rodríguez** (2–5) | | | 52,968 | 61–45 | L1 |
| 107 | August 6 | | Red Sox | 0–4 | Tiant (8–4) | **Travers** (7–6) | | | 48,444 | 61–46 | L2 |
| 108 | August 8 | 7:00 p.m. CDT | @ Yankees | 0–3 | Tidrow (5–8) | **Caldwell** (14–6) | Gossage (16) | 2:27 | 22,549 | 61–47 | L3 |
| 109 | August 9 | 7:00 p.m. CDT | @ Yankees | 7–8 | McCall (1–1) | **McClure** (2–3) | — | 2:53 | 27,172 | 61–48 | L4 |
| 110 | August 10 | 7:00 p.m. CDT | @ Yankees | 0–9 | Guidry (16–2) | **Augustine** (10–11) | — | 2:06 | 35,127 | 61–49 | L5 |
| 111 | August 11 | | @ Red Sox | 10–5 | **Rodríguez** (3–5) | Tiant (8–5) | | | 35,142 | 62–49 | W1 |
| 112 | August 12 | | @ Red Sox | 1–3 | Wright (7–2) | **Travers** (7–7) | | | 33,092 | 62–50 | L1 |
| 113 | August 12 | | @ Red Sox | 4–11 | Stanley (9–1) | **Caldwell** (14–7) | | | 27,030 | 62–51 | L2 |
| 114 | August 13 | | @ Red Sox | 3–4 (10) | Torrez (14–6) | **Castro** (3–4) | | | 34,460 | 62–52 | L3 |
| 115 | August 14 | | @ Red Sox | 4–3 | **Sorensen** (14–8) | Lee (10–9) | **McClure** (7) | | 33,766 | 63–52 | W1 |
| – | August 15 | | Blue Jays | Postponed (rain); Makeup: August 16 | | | | | | | |
| 116 | August 15 | | Blue Jays | 9–1 | **Augustine** (11–11) | Lemanczyk (4–14) | | | 17,578 | 64–52 | W2 |
| 117 | August 16 | | Blue Jays | 8–1 | **Caldwell** (15–7) | Jefferson (7–10) | | | – | 65–52 | W3 |
| 118 | August 16 | | Blue Jays | 3–2 | **Rodríguez** (4–5) | Moore (5–4) | **McClure** (8) | | 16,920 | 66–52 | W4 |
| 119 | August 17 | | Blue Jays | 6–0 | **Travers** (8–7) | Clancy (9–10) | | | 18,829 | 67–52 | W5 |
| 120 | August 18 | | Tigers | 2–0 | **Sorensen** (15–8) | Rozema (6–7) | | | 27,543 | 68–52 | W6 |
| 121 | August 19 | | Tigers | 4–6 | Wilcox (10–8) | **Augustine** (11–12) | | | 35,104 | 68–53 | L1 |
| 122 | August 20 | | Tigers | 2–1 | **Caldwell** (16–7) | Young (4–3) | | | 46,791 | 69–53 | W1 |
| 123 | August 22 | | Indians | 3–2 | **Castro** (4–4) | Kern (8–7) | | | – | 70–53 | W2 |
| 124 | August 22 | | Indians | 5–4 | **Mueller** (1–0) | Kern (8–8) | | | 23,918 | 71–53 | W3 |
| 125 | August 23 | | Indians | 9–4 | **Replogle** (6–2) | Monge (3–3) | | | 20,157 | 72–53 | W4 |
| 126 | August 24 | | Indians | 8–9 (10) | Spillner (3–1) | **McClure** (2–4) | Monge (6) | | 16,362 | 72–54 | L1 |
| 127 | August 25 | | @ Tigers | 3–6 | Young (5–3) | **Caldwell** (16–8) | Hiller (10) | | 32,010 | 72–55 | L2 |
| 128 | August 26 | | @ Tigers | 9–5 | **Travers** (9–7) | Billingham (14–6) | **McClure** (9) | | 32,103 | 73–55 | W1 |
| 129 | August 27 | | @ Tigers | 2–4 | Slaton (14–9) | **Sorensen** (15–9) | Hiller (11) | | 43,478 | 73–56 | L1 |
| 130 | August 28 | | @ Tigers | 10–1 | **Augustine** (12–12) | Rozema (6–9) | | | 23,037 | 74–56 | W1 |
| 131 | August 29 | | @ Indians | 6–0 | **Replogle** (7–2) | Wise (9–17) | | | 5,498 | 75–56 | W2 |
| – | August 30 | | @ Indians | Postponed (rain); Makeup: August 31 | | | | | | | |
| 132 | August 31 | | @ Indians | 1–0 | **Caldwell** (17–8) | Paxton (9–8) | | | – | 76–56 | W3 |
| 133 | August 31 | | @ Indians | 6–12 | Waits (10–13) | **Travers** (9–8) | | | 5,328 | 76–57 | L1 |

September: 16–12 (Home: 8–5; Away: 8–7)

| # | Date | Time (CT) | Opponent | Score | Win | Loss | Save | Time of Game | Attendance | Record | Streak |
|---|---|---|---|---|---|---|---|---|---|---|---|
| 134 | September 1 | | Rangers | 4–5 | Jenkins (13–8) | **Sorensen** (15–10) | Cleveland (11) | | 13,648 | 76–58 | L2 |
| 135 | September 2 | | Rangers | 10–6 | **Castro** (5–4) | Barker (1–5) | | | 17,795 | 77–58 | W1 |
| 136 | September 3 | | Rangers | 4–3 | **Farmer** (1–0) | Matlack (12–12) | | | 14,014 | 78–58 | W2 |
| 137 | September 4 | | Mariners | 3–4 | Abbott (7–10) | **Caldwell** (17–9) | | | – | 78–59 | L1 |
| 138 | September 4 | | Mariners | 5–0 | **Travers** (10–8) | McLaughlin (2–6) | | | 19,408 | 79–59 | W1 |
| 139 | September 6 | | @ Blue Jays | 7–0 | **Sorensen** (16–10) | Jefferson (7–12) | | | 21,390 | 80–59 | W2 |
| 140 | September 7 | | @ Blue Jays | 4–5 | Cruz (7–1) | **McClure** (2–5) | | | 12,092 | 80–60 | L1 |
| 141 | September 8 | | @ Twins | 3–0 | **Replogle** (8–2) | Serum (8–7) | | | 9,262 | 81–60 | W1 |
| 142 | September 9 | | @ Twins | 3–0 | **Caldwell** (18–9) | Erickson (13–11) | | | 10,639 | 82–60 | W2 |
| 143 | September 10 | | @ Twins | 1–3 | Goltz (12–10) | **Travers** (10–9) | | | 10,512 | 82–61 | L1 |
| 144 | September 11 | | @ Mariners | 5–3 | **Sorensen** (17–10) | McLaughlin (2–7) | **Castro** (6) | | 5,246 | 83–61 | W1 |
| 145 | September 12 | | @ Mariners | 5–6 | Todd (3–4) | **McClure** (2–6) | | | 5,577 | 83–62 | L1 |
| 146 | September 13 | | Orioles | 7–5 | **Replogle** (9–2) | Flanagan (17–13) | **Farmer** (1) | | 8,863 | 84–62 | W1 |
| 147 | September 14 | | Orioles | 4–3 | **Caldwell** (19–9) | McGregor (14–13) | | | 12,587 | 85–62 | W2 |
| 148 | September 15 | | Twins | 3–10 | Erickson (14–11) | **Travers** (10–10) | | | 12,496 | 85–63 | L1 |
| 149 | September 16 | | Twins | 2–5 | Goltz (13–10) | **Sorensen** (17–11) | Marshall (20) | | 37,809 | 85–64 | L2 |
| 150 | September 17 | | Twins | 3–4 | Serum (9–8) | **Replogle** (9–3) | Marshall (21) | | 11,007 | 85–65 | L3 |
| 151 | September 18 | 7:00 p.m. CDT | @ Yankees | 3–4 | Figueroa (18–9) | **Travers** (10–11) | — | 2:44 | 20,557 | 85–66 | L4 |
| 152 | September 19 | 7:00 p.m. CDT | @ Yankees | 2–0 | **Caldwell** (20–9) | Tidrow (7–11) | — | 2:05 | 26,682 | 86–66 | W1 |
| 153 | September 20 | | @ Royals | 5–4 | **Augustine** (13–12) | Paschall (0–1) | | | 15,917 | 87–66 | W2 |
| 154 | September 21 | | @ Royals | 4–8 | Leonard (19–17) | **Replogle** (9–4) | | | 17,799 | 87–67 | L1 |
| 155 | September 22 | | Athletics | 3–0 | **Rodríguez** (5–5) | Keough (8–14) | **Castro** (7) | | 9,675 | 88–67 | W1 |
| 156 | September 23 | | Athletics | 13–4 | **Travers** (11–11) | Norris (0–5) | | | 14,450 | 89–67 | W2 |
| 157 | September 24 | | Athletics | 5–2 | **Caldwell** (21–9) | Langford (7–13) | | | 16,535 | 90–67 | W3 |
| 158 | September 26 | | @ Angels | 3–4 (10) | LaRoche (10–8) | **Sorensen** (17–12) | | | 12,646 | 90–68 | L1 |
| 159 | September 27 | | @ Angels | 1–4 | Frost (5–4) | **Replogle** (9–5) | LaRoche (25) | | 12,302 | 90–69 | L2 |
| 160 | September 29 | | @ Athletics | 3–1 | **Travers** (12–11) | Keough (8–15) | | | 1,992 | 91–69 | W1 |
| 161 | September 30 | | @ Athletics | 8–5 | **Caldwell** (22–9) | Johnson (11–10) | **Castro** (8) | | 2,143 | 92–69 | W2 |

October: 1–0 (Home: 0–0; Away: 1–0)

| # | Date | Time (CT) | Opponent | Score | Win | Loss | Save | Time of Game | Attendance | Record | Streak |
|---|---|---|---|---|---|---|---|---|---|---|---|
| 162 | October 1 | | @ Athletics | 9–0 | **Sorensen** (18–12) | Wirth (5–6) | **Haas** (1) | | 2,742 | 93–69 | W3 |

== Player stats ==
=== Batting ===
==== Starters by position ====
Note: Pos = Position; G = Games played; AB = At bats; H = Hits; Avg. = Batting average; HR = Home runs; RBI = Runs batted in

| Pos | Player | G | AB | H | Avg. | HR | RBI |
|---|---|---|---|---|---|---|---|
| C | Buck Martinez | 89 | 256 | 56 | .219 | 1 | 20 |
| 1B | Cecil Cooper | 107 | 407 | 127 | .312 | 13 | 54 |
| 2B | Paul Molitor | 125 | 521 | 142 | .273 | 6 | 45 |
| 3B | Sal Bando | 152 | 540 | 154 | .285 | 17 | 78 |
| SS | Robin Yount | 127 | 502 | 147 | .293 | 9 | 71 |
| LF | Larry Hisle | 142 | 520 | 151 | .290 | 34 | 115 |
| CF | Gorman Thomas | 137 | 452 | 111 | .246 | 32 | 86 |
| RF | Sixto Lezcano | 132 | 442 | 129 | .292 | 15 | 61 |
| DH | Dick Davis | 69 | 218 | 54 | .248 | 5 | 26 |

==== Other batters ====
Note: G = Games played; AB = At bats; H = Hits; Avg. = Batting average; HR = Home runs; RBI = Runs batted in

| Player | G | AB | H | Avg. | HR | RBI |
|---|---|---|---|---|---|---|
| Don Money | 137 | 518 | 152 | .293 | 14 | 54 |
| Ben Oglivie | 128 | 469 | 142 | .303 | 18 | 72 |
| Charlie Moore | 96 | 268 | 72 | .269 | 5 | 31 |
| Jim Wohlford | 46 | 118 | 35 | .297 | 1 | 19 |
| Jim Gantner | 43 | 97 | 21 | .216 | 1 | 8 |
| Lenn Sakata | 30 | 78 | 15 | .192 | 0 | 3 |
| Dave May | 39 | 77 | 15 | .195 | 2 | 11 |
| Tony Muser | 15 | 30 | 4 | .133 | 0 | 5 |
| Tim Nordbrook | 2 | 5 | 0 | .000 | 0 | 0 |
| Andy Etchebarren | 4 | 5 | 2 | .400 | 0 | 2 |
| Jeff Yurak | 5 | 5 | 0 | .000 | 0 | 0 |
| Larry Haney | 5 | 5 | 1 | .200 | 0 | 1 |
| Tim Johnson | 3 | 3 | 0 | .000 | 0 | 0 |

=== Pitching ===
==== Starting pitchers ====
Note: G = Games pitched; IP = Innings pitched; W = Wins; L = Losses; ERA = Earned run average; SO = Strikeouts

| Player | G | IP | W | L | ERA | SO |
|---|---|---|---|---|---|---|
| Mike Caldwell | 37 | 293.1 | 22 | 9 | 2.36 | 131 |
| Lary Sorensen | 37 | 280.2 | 18 | 12 | 3.21 | 78 |
| Jerry Augustine | 35 | 188.1 | 13 | 12 | 4.54 | 59 |
| Bill Travers | 28 | 175.2 | 12 | 11 | 4.41 | 66 |
| Moose Haas | 7 | 30.2 | 2 | 3 | 6.16 | 32 |

==== Other pitchers ====
Note: G = Games pitched; IP = Innings pitched; W = Wins; L = Losses; ERA = Earned run average; SO = Strikeouts

| Player | G | IP | W | L | ERA | SO |
|---|---|---|---|---|---|---|
| Andy Replogle | 32 | 149.1 | 9 | 5 | 3.92 | 41 |
| Eduardo Rodríguez | 32 | 105.1 | 5 | 5 | 3.93 | 51 |
| Mark Bomback | 2 | 1.2 | 0 | 0 | 16.20 | 1 |

==== Relief pitchers ====
Note: G = Games pitched; W = Wins; L = Losses; SV = Saves; ERA = Earned run average; SO = Strikeouts

| Player | G | W | L | SV | ERA | SO |
|---|---|---|---|---|---|---|
| Bob McClure | 44 | 2 | 6 | 9 | 3.74 | 47 |
| Bill Castro | 42 | 5 | 4 | 8 | 1.81 | 17 |
| Randy Stein | 31 | 3 | 2 | 1 | 5.33 | 42 |
| Willie Mueller | 5 | 1 | 0 | 0 | 6.39 | 6 |
| Ed Farmer | 3 | 1 | 0 | 1 | 0.82 | 6 |

== Farm system ==
The Brewers' farm system consisted of four minor league affiliates in 1978.

| Level | Team | League | Manager |
|---|---|---|---|
| Triple-A | Spokane Indians | Pacific Coast League | John Felske |
| Double-A | Holyoke Millers | Eastern League | George Farson |
| Class A | Burlington Bees | Midwest League | Lee Sigman |
| Class A Short Season | Newark Co-Pilots | New York–Penn League | Ken Richardson |
