= 1977 Milwaukee Brewers season =

1977 Milwaukee Brewers
- League: American League
- Division: East
- Ballpark: Milwaukee County Stadium
- City: Milwaukee, Wisconsin, United States
- Record: 67–95 (.414)
- Divisional place: 6th
- Owners: Bud Selig
- General managers: Jim Baumer
- Managers: Alex Grammas
- Television: WTMJ-TV (Merle Harmon, Bob Uecker, Ray Scott)
- Radio: 620 WTMJ (Merle Harmon, Bob Uecker)
- Stats: ESPN.com; Baseball Reference

The 1977 Milwaukee Brewers season was the 8th season for the Brewers in Milwaukee, and their 9th overall. The Brewers finished sixth in the American League East with a record of 67 wins and 95 losses.

== Offseason ==
- November 19, 1976: Sal Bando was signed as a free agent by the Brewers.
- December 6, 1976: Jim Colborn and Darrell Porter were traded by the Brewers to the Kansas City Royals for Jamie Quirk, Jim Wohlford and a player to be named later. The Royals completed the deal by sending Bob McClure to the Brewers on March 15, 1977.
- December 6, 1976: George Scott and Bernie Carbo were traded by the Brewers to the Boston Red Sox for Cecil Cooper.
- December 7, 1976: Jeff Yurak was drafted by the Brewers from the San Francisco Giants in the 1976 minor league draft.
- February 25, 1977: Ken McMullen was purchased by the Brewers from the Oakland Athletics.

== Regular season ==
- July 1, 1977: The Brewers played their first game in Seattle in 8 years, when they were the failed Seattle Pilots. The Brewers beat the hometown expansion Mariners 2–1.
- September 14, 1977: Ken McMullen hit a home run in the last at bat of his career.

=== Season standings ===
AL East
Team	W	L	Pct.	GB	Home	Road
New York Yankees	100	62	.617	—	55‍–‍26	45‍–‍36
Baltimore Orioles	97	64	.602	2½	54‍–‍27	43‍–‍37
Boston Red Sox	97	64	.602	2½	51‍–‍29	46‍–‍35
Detroit Tigers	74	88	.457	26	39‍–‍42	35‍–‍46
Cleveland Indians	71	90	.441	28½	37‍–‍44	34‍–‍46
Milwaukee Brewers	67	95	.414	33	37‍–‍44	30‍–‍51
Toronto Blue Jays	54	107	.335	45½	25‍–‍55	29‍–‍52

=== Record vs. opponents ===
1977 American League record Sources:
Team	BAL	BOS	CAL	CWS	CLE	DET	KC	MIL	MIN	NYY	OAK	SEA	TEX	TOR
Baltimore	—	6–8	5–6	5–5	11–4	12–3	4–7	11–4	6–4	8–7	8–2	7–3	4–6	10–5
Boston	8–6	—	7–3	3–7	8–7	9–6	5–5	9–6	4–6	8–7	8–3	10–1	6–4	12–3
California	6–5	3–7	—	8–7	6–4	4–6	6–9	5–5	7–8	4–7	5–10	9–6	5–10	6–4
Chicago	5–5	7–3	7–8	—	6–4	4–6	8–7	6–5	10–5	3–7	10–5	10–5	6–9	8–3
Cleveland	4–11	7–8	4–6	4–6	—	8–7	3–7	11–4	2–9	3–12	7–3	7–3	2–9	9–5
Detroit	3–12	6–9	6–4	6–4	7–8	—	3–8	10–5	5–5	6–9	5–5	5–6	2–8	10–5
Kansas City	7–4	5–5	9–6	7–8	7–3	8–3	—	8–2	10–5	5–5	9–6	11–4	8–7	8–2
Milwaukee	4–11	6–9	5–5	5–6	4–11	5–10	2–8	—	3–8	8–7	5–5	7–3	5–5	8–7
Minnesota	4–6	6–4	8–7	5–10	9–2	5–5	5–10	8–3	—	2–8	8–6	7–8	8–7	9–1
New York	7–8	7–8	7–4	7–3	12–3	9–6	5–5	7–8	8–2	—	9–2	6–4	7–3	9–6
Oakland	2–8	3–8	10–5	5–10	3–7	5–5	6–9	5–5	6–8	2–9	—	7–8	2–13	7–3
Seattle	3–7	1–10	6–9	5–10	3–7	6–5	4–11	3–7	8–7	4–6	8–7	—	9–6	4–6
Texas	6–4	4–6	10–5	9–6	9–2	8–2	7–8	5–5	7–8	3–7	13–2	6–9	—	7–4
Toronto	5–10	3–12	4–6	3–8	5–9	5–10	2–8	7–8	1–9	6–9	3–7	6–4	4–7	—

=== Notable transactions ===
- June 7, 1977: Paul Molitor was drafted by the Brewers in the 1st round (3rd pick) of the 1977 Major League Baseball draft. Player signed June 24, 1977.

=== Roster ===
1977 Milwaukee Brewers
Roster
Pitchers: 46 Jerry Augustine; 27 Gary Beare; 48 Mike Caldwell; 35 Bill Castro; 18 Barry Cort; 45 Rich Folkers; 30 Moose Haas; 40 Sam Hinds; 10 Bob McClure; 23 Eduardo Rodríguez; 41 Jim Slaton; 39 Lary Sorensen; 25 Bill Travers	Catchers: 12 Larry Haney; 22 Charlie Moore; Infielders: 6 Sal Bando; 15 Cecil Cooper; 11 Jim Gantner; 8 Jack Heidemann; 4 Tim Johnson; 17 Ken McMullen; 7 Don Money; 31 Ed Romero; 21 Lenn Sakata; 21 Bob Sheldon; 19 Robin Yount	Outfielders: 11 Steve Brye; 26 Dick Davis; 6 Mike Hegan; 28 Von Joshua; 3 Ed Kirkpatrick; 37 Sixto Lezcano; 6 Jamie Quirk; 39 Dan Thomas; 14 Jim Wohlford; 8 Jimmy Wynn	Manager: 2 Alex Grammas; Coaches: 24 Jim Bragan (Third base); 33 Frank Howard (Hitting); 32 Harvey Kuenn (First base); 38 Cal McLish (Pitching); 37 Hal Smith (Bullpen)

== Player stats ==
=== Batting ===
==== Starters by position ====
Note: Pos = Position; G = Games played; AB = At bats; H = Hits; Avg. = Batting average; HR = Home runs; RBI = Runs batted in

Pos	Player	G	AB	H	Avg.	HR	RBI
C	Charlie Moore	138	375	93	.248	5	45
1B	Cecil Cooper	160	643	193	.300	20	78
2B	Don Money	152	570	159	.279	25	83
3B	Sal Bando	159	580	145	.250	17	82
SS	Robin Yount	154	605	174	.288	4	49
LF	Jim Wohlford	129	391	97	.248	2	36
CF	Von Joshua	144	536	140	.261	9	49
RF	Sixto Lezcano	109	400	109	.273	21	49
DH	Jamie Quirk	93	221	48	.217	3	13

==== Other batters ====
Note: G = Games played; AB = At bats; H = Hits; Avg. = Batting average; HR = Home runs; RBI = Runs batted in

Player	G	AB	H	Avg.	HR	RBI
Steve Brye	94	241	60	.249	7	28
Lenn Sakata	53	154	25	.162	2	12
Ken McMullen	63	136	31	.228	5	19
Larry Haney	63	127	29	.228	0	10
Jim Wynn	36	117	23	.197	0	10
Ed Kirkpatrick	29	77	21	.273	0	6
Dan Thomas	22	70	19	.271	2	11
Bob Sheldon	31	64	13	.203	0	3
Mike Hegan	35	53	9	.170	2	3
Dick Davis	22	51	14	.275	0	6
Jim Gantner	14	47	14	.298	1	2
Tim Johnson	30	33	2	.061	0	2
Ed Romero	10	25	7	.280	0	2
Jack Heidemann	5	1	0	.000	0	0

=== Pitching ===
==== Starting pitchers ====
Note: G = Games pitched; IP = Innings pitched; W = Wins; L = Losses; ERA = Earned run average; SO = Strikeouts

Player	G	IP	W	L	ERA	SO
Jim Slaton	32	221.0	10	14	3.58	104
Jerry Augustine	33	209.0	12	18	4.48	68
Moose Haas	32	197.2	10	12	4.33	113
Lary Sorensen	23	142.1	7	10	4.36	57
Bill Travers	19	121.1	4	12	5.25	49

==== Other pitchers ====
Note: G = Games pitched; IP = Innings pitched; W = Wins; L = Losses; ERA = Earned run average; SO = Strikeouts

Player	G	IP	W	L	ERA	SO
Eduardo Rodríguez	42	142.2	5	6	4.35	104
Mike Caldwell	21	94.1	5	8	4.58	38
Gary Beare	17	58.2	6	6	6.44	32
Barry Cort	7	24.1	1	1	3.33	17

==== Relief pitchers ====
Note: G = Games pitched; W = Wins; L = Losses; SV = Saves; ERA = Earned run average; SO = Strikeouts

Player	G	W	L	SV	ERA	SO
Bill Castro	51	8	6	13	4.15	28
Bob McClure	68	2	1	6	2.52	57
Sam Hinds	29	0	3	2	4.73	46
Rich Folkers	3	0	1	0	4.26	6

== Farm system ==
The Brewers' farm system consisted of four minor league affiliates in 1977. The Burlington Bees won the Midwest League championship.

Level	Team	League	Manager
Triple-A	Spokane Indians	Pacific Coast League	John Felske
Double-A	Holyoke Millers	Eastern League	Matt Galante
Class A	Burlington Bees	Midwest League	Denis Menke
Class A Short Season	Newark Co-Pilots	New York–Penn League	Dennis Holmberg
