= 1980 Milwaukee Brewers season =

1980 Milwaukee Brewers
- League: American League
- Division: East
- Ballpark: Milwaukee County Stadium
- City: Milwaukee, Wisconsin, United States
- Record: 86–76 (.531)
- Divisional place: 3rd
- Owners: Bud Selig
- General managers: Harry Dalton
- Managers: Buck Rodgers, George Bamberger
- Television: WTMJ-TV (Lorn Brown, Bob Uecker, Mike Hegan)
- Radio: 620 WTMJ (Lorn Brown, Bob Uecker)
- Stats: ESPN.com; Baseball Reference

The 1980 Milwaukee Brewers season was the 11th season for the Brewers in Milwaukee, and their 12th overall. The Brewers finished third in the American League East with a record of 86 wins and 76 losses. The Brewers led MLB in home runs (203), grand slams (8), runs batted in (774), slugging percentage (.448), on-base plus slugging (.777) and OPS+ (114).

== Offseason ==
- October 11, 1979: Juan Castillo was signed as an amateur free agent by the Brewers.
- December 6, 1979: Lenn Sakata was traded by the Brewers to the Baltimore Orioles for John Flinn.

== Regular season ==
=== Season standings ===
AL East
Team	W	L	Pct.	GB	Home	Road
New York Yankees	103	59	.636	—	53‍–‍28	50‍–‍31
Baltimore Orioles	100	62	.617	3	50‍–‍31	50‍–‍31
Milwaukee Brewers	86	76	.531	17	40‍–‍42	46‍–‍34
Boston Red Sox	83	77	.519	19	36‍–‍45	47‍–‍32
Detroit Tigers	84	78	.519	19	43‍–‍38	41‍–‍40
Cleveland Indians	79	81	.494	23	44‍–‍35	35‍–‍46
Toronto Blue Jays	67	95	.414	36	35‍–‍46	32‍–‍49

=== Record vs. opponents ===
1980 American League record Sources:
Team	BAL	BOS	CAL	CWS	CLE	DET	KC	MIL	MIN	NYY	OAK	SEA	TEX	TOR
Baltimore	—	8–5	10–2	6–6	6–7	10–3	6–6	7–6	10–2	7–6	7–5	6–6	6–6	11–2
Boston	5–8	—	9–3	6–4	7–6	8–5	5–7	6–7	6–6	3–10	9–3	7–5	5–7	7–6
California	2–10	3–9	—	3–10	4–6	5–7	5–8	6–6	7–6	2–10	3–10	11–2	11–2	3–9
Chicago	6–6	4–6	10–3	—	5–7	2–10	5–8	5–7	5–8	5–7	6–7	6–7	6–7–2	5–7
Cleveland	7–6	6–7	6–4	7–5	—	3–10	5–7	3–10	9–3	5–8	6–6	8–4	6–6	8–5
Detroit	3–10	5–8	7–5	10–2	10–3	—	2–10	7–6	6–6	5–8	6–6	10–2–1	4–8	9–4
Kansas City	6–6	7–5	8–5	8–5	7–5	10–2	—	6–6	5–8	8–4	6–7	7–6	10–3	9–3
Milwaukee	6–7	7–6	6–6	7–5	10–3	6–7	6–6	—	7–5	5–8	7–5	9–3	5–7	5–8
Minnesota	2–10	6–6	6–7	8–5	3–9	6–6	8–5	5–7	—	4–8	6–7	7–6	9–3	7–5
New York	6–7	10–3	10–2	7–5	8–5	8–5	4–8	8–5	8–4	—	8–4	9–3	7–5	10–3
Oakland	5–7	3–9	10–3	7–6	6–6	6–6	7–6	5–7	7–6	4–8	—	8–5	7–6	8–4
Seattle	6–6	5–7	2–11	7–6	4–8	2–10–1	6–7	3–9	6–7	3–9	5–8	—	4–9	6–6
Texas	6–6	7–5	2–11	7–6–2	6–6	8–4	3–10	7–5	3–9	5–7	6–7	9–4	—	7–5
Toronto	2–11	6–7	9–3	7–5	5–8	4–9	3–9	8–5	5–7	3–10	4–8	6–6	5–7	—

=== Notable transactions ===
- April 3, 1980: Ray Fosse was released by the Brewers.
- July 24, 1980: Bill Lyons was signed as an amateur free agent by the Brewers.
- September 1, 1980: John Poff was selected off waivers by the Brewers from the Philadelphia Phillies.

=== Roster ===
1980 Milwaukee Brewers
Roster
Pitchers: 46 Jerry Augustine; 34 Dan Boitano; 48 Mike Caldwell; 35 Bill Castro; 23 Reggie Cleveland; 40 John Flinn; 30 Moose Haas; 47 Fred Holdsworth; 45 Rickey Keeton; 42 Dave LaPoint; 10 Bob McClure; 43 Paul Mitchell; 41 Jim Slaton; 39 Lary Sorensen; 25 Bill Travers	Catchers: 21 Buck Martinez; 22 Charlie Moore; 5 Ned Yost; Infielders: 6 Sal Bando; 15 Cecil Cooper; 17 Jim Gantner; 4 Paul Molitor; 7 Don Money; 34 Ed Romero; 19 Robin Yount	Outfielders: 29 Mark Brouhard; 26 Dick Davis; 28 Vic Harris; 16 Sixto Lezcano; 24 Ben Oglivie; 8 John Poff; 20 Gorman Thomas; Other batters: 9 Larry Hisle	Manager: 31 George Bamberger; 37 Buck Rodgers; Coaches: 6 Sal Bando; 12 Larry Haney (Bullpen); 18 Ron Hansen; 33 Frank Howard (First base); 32 Harvey Kuenn (Hitting); 38 Cal McLish (Pitching); 37 Buck Rodgers (Third base)

== Player stats ==
= Indicates team leader

= Indicates league leader

=== Batting ===
==== Starters by position ====
Note: Pos = Position; G = Games played; AB = At bats; H = Hits; Avg. = Batting average; HR = Home runs; RBI = Runs batted in

Pos	Player	G	AB	H	Avg.	HR	RBI
C	Charlie Moore	111	320	93	.291	2	30
1B	Cecil Cooper	153	622	219	.352	25	122
2B	Paul Molitor	111	450	137	.304	9	37
SS	Robin Yount	143	611	179	.293	23	87
3B	Jim Gantner	132	415	117	.282	4	40
LF	Ben Oglivie	156	592	180	.304	41	118
CF	Gorman Thomas	162	628	150	.239	38	105
RF	Sixto Lezcano	112	411	94	.229	18	55
DH	Dick Davis	106	365	99	.271	4	30

==== Other batters ====
Note: G = Games played; AB = At bats; H = Hits; Avg. = Batting average; HR = Home runs; RBI = Runs batted in

Player	G	AB	H	Avg.	HR	RBI
Don Money	86	289	74	.256	17	46
Sal Bando	78	254	50	.197	5	31
Buck Martinez	76	219	49	.224	3	17
Mark Brouhard	45	125	29	.232	5	16
Ed Romero	42	104	27	.260	1	10
Vic Harris	34	89	19	.213	1	7
John Poff	19	68	17	.250	1	7
Larry Hisle	17	60	17	.283	6	16
Ned Yost	15	31	5	.161	0	0

=== Pitching ===
==== Starting pitchers ====
Note: G = Games pitched; IP = Innings pitched; W = Wins; L = Losses; ERA = Earned run average; SO = Strikeouts

Player	G	IP	W	L	ERA	SO
Moose Haas	33	252.1	16	15	3.10	146
Mike Caldwell	34	225.1	13	11	4.03	74
Lary Sorensen	35	195.2	12	10	3.68	54
Bill Travers	29	154.1	12	6	3.91	62
Rickey Keeton	5	28.1	2	2	4.76	8
Jim Slaton	3	16.1	1	1	4.41	4

==== Other pitchers ====
Note: G = Games pitched; IP = Innings pitched; W = Wins; L = Losses; ERA = Earned run average; SO = Strikeouts

Player	G	IP	W	L	ERA	SO
Reggie Cleveland	45	154.1	11	9	3.73	54
Paul Mitchell	17	89.1	5	5	3.53	29
Dave LaPoint	5	15.0	1	0	6.00	5

==== Relief pitchers ====
Note: G = Games pitched; W = Wins; L = Losses; SV = Saves; ERA = Earned run average; SO = Strikeouts

Player	G	W	L	SV	ERA	SO
Bob McClure	52	5	8	10	3.08	47
Bill Castro	56	2	4	8	2.77	32
Jerry Augustine	39	4	3	2	4.52	22
John Flinn	20	2	1	2	3.89	15
Dan Boitano	11	0	1	0	8.15	11
Fred Holdsworth	9	0	0	0	4.58	12

== Awards and honors ==
- Cecil Cooper, Silver Slugger Award, first base

== Farm system ==
The Brewers' farm system consisted of five minor league affiliates in 1980. The Holyoke Millers won the Eastern League championship, and the Stockton Ports won the California League championship.

Level	Team	League	Manager
Triple-A	Vancouver Canadians	Pacific Coast League	Bob Didier
Double-A	Holyoke Millers	Eastern League	Lee Sigman
Class A	Stockton Ports	California League	Tony Muser
Class A	Burlington Bees	Midwest League	Duane Espy
Rookie	Butte Copper Kings	Pioneer League	Ken Richardson
