= 1976 Milwaukee Brewers season =

1976 Milwaukee Brewers
- League: American League
- Division: East
- Ballpark: Milwaukee County Stadium
- City: Milwaukee, Wisconsin, United States
- Record: 66–95 (.410)
- Divisional place: 6th
- Owners: Bud Selig
- General managers: Jim Baumer
- Managers: Alex Grammas
- Television: WTMJ-TV (Merle Harmon, Bob Uecker, Ray Scott)
- Radio: 620 WTMJ (Merle Harmon, Bob Uecker)
- Stats: ESPN.com; Baseball Reference

The 1976 Milwaukee Brewers season was the 7th season for the Brewers in Milwaukee, and their 8th overall. The Brewers finished sixth in the American League East with 66 wins and 95 losses.. It was the seventh consecutive losing season in Milwaukee and the eighth overall for the franchise since its inception.

== Offseason ==
- November 14, 1975: Ed Romero was signed as an amateur free agent by the Brewers.

== Regular season ==
(1976)
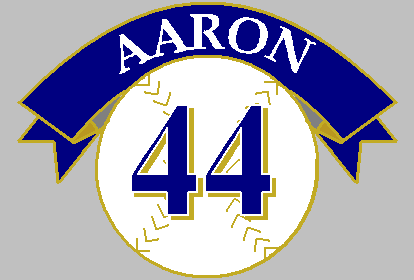
Hank Aaron
OF: 1954–65
1975–76

=== Hank Aaron's 755th ===
- July 20, 1976: Hank Aaron hit the 755th and final home run of his career off California Angels pitcher Dick Drago.

==== Line score ====
July 20, County Stadium, Milwaukee, Wisconsin

Team	1	2	3	4	5	6	7	8	9	R	H	E
California	0	0	0	1	0	0	0	0	1	2	6	2
Milwaukee	1	0	0	1	0	0	3	1	x	6	12	0
W: Augustine (3–7) L: Ross (6–12) SV: Frisella (4)
Home runs: Melton (4), Scott (10), Aaron (10) Attendance: 10,134 Time: 2:37

==== Hank Aaron's final home runs ====
Home run	Date	Pitcher	Inning	Location
746	May 4, 1976	Nelson Briles	Bottom 4th	County Stadium
747	May 19, 1976	Mike Cuellar	Top 6th	Memorial Stadium
748	June 14, 1976	Frank Tanana	Bottom 3rd	County Stadium
749	June 16, 1976	Paul Hartzell	Top 9th	Anaheim Stadium
750	June 18, 1976	Jim Todd	Top 9th	Oakland Alameda County Coliseum
751	June 19, 1976	Glenn Abbott	Top 6th	Oakland Alameda County Coliseum
752	June 22, 1976	Dave Roberts	Bottom 4th	County Stadium
753	July 9, 1976	Jim Umbarger	Bottom 2nd	County Stadium
754	July 11, 1976	Steve Foucault	Bottom 10th	County Stadium
755	July 20, 1976	Dick Drago	Bottom 7th	County Stadium

=== Season standings ===
AL East
Team	W	L	Pct.	GB	Home	Road
New York Yankees	97	62	.610	—	45‍–‍35	52‍–‍27
Baltimore Orioles	88	74	.543	10½	42‍–‍39	46‍–‍35
Boston Red Sox	83	79	.512	15½	46‍–‍35	37‍–‍44
Cleveland Indians	81	78	.509	16	44‍–‍35	37‍–‍43
Detroit Tigers	74	87	.460	24	36‍–‍44	38‍–‍43
Milwaukee Brewers	66	95	.410	32	36‍–‍45	30‍–‍50

=== Record vs. opponents ===
1976 American League record Sources:
Team	BAL	BOS	CAL	CWS	CLE	DET	KC	MIL	MIN	NYY	OAK	TEX
Baltimore	—	7–11	8–4	8–4	7–11	12–6	6–6	11–7	4–8	13–5	4–8	8–4
Boston	11–7	—	7–5	6–6	9–9	14–4	3–9	12–6	7–5	7–11	4–8	3–9
California	4–8	5–7	—	11–7	7–5	6–6	8–10	4–8	8–10	5–7	6–12	12–6
Chicago	4–8	6–6	7–11	—	3–9	6–6	8–10	7–5	7–11	1–11	8–9	7–11
Cleveland	11–7	9–9	5–7	9–3	—	6–12	6–6	11–6	9–3	4–12	4–8	7–5
Detroit	6–12	4–14	6–6	6–6	12–6	—	4–8	12–6	4–8	9–8	6–6	5–7
Kansas City	6–6	9–3	10–8	10–8	6–6	8–4	—	8–4	10–8	7–5	9–9	7–11
Milwaukee	7–11	6–12	8–4	5–7	6–11	6–12	4–8	—	4–8	5–13	5–7	10–2
Minnesota	8–4	5–7	10–8	11–7	3–9	8–4	8–10	8–4	—	2–10	11–7	11–7
New York	5–13	11–7	7–5	11–1	12–4	8–9	5–7	13–5	10–2	—	6–6	9–3
Oakland	8–4	8–4	12–6	9–8	8–4	6–6	9–9	7–5	7–11	6–6	—	7–11
Texas	4–8	9–3	6–12	11–7	5–7	7–5	11–7	2–10	7–11	3–9	11–7	—

=== Opening day starters ===
- Hank Aaron
- Pedro García
- Sixto Lezcano
- Don Money
- Charlie Moore
- Darrell Porter
- George Scott
- Bill Sharp
- Jim Slaton
- Robin Yount

=== Notable transactions ===
- June 2, 1976: Von Joshua was purchased by the Brewers from the San Francisco Giants.
- June 3, 1976: Bobby Darwin and Tom Murphy were traded by the Brewers to the Boston Red Sox for Bernie Carbo.
- June 8, 1976: Bill Bordley was drafted by the Brewers in the 1st round (4th pick) of the 1976 Major League Baseball draft, but did not sign.

=== Roster ===
1976 Milwaukee Brewers
Roster
Pitchers: 46 Jerry Augustine; 43 Rick Austin; 27 Gary Beare; 40 Pete Broberg; 35 Bill Castro; 38 Bill Champion; 48 Jim Colborn; 42 Danny Frisella; 30 Moose Haas; 18 Tom Hausman; 43 Kevin Kobel; 42 Tom Murphy; 23 Eduardo Rodríguez; 34 Ray Sadecki; 41 Jim Slaton; 29 Ed Sprague; 25 Bill Travers	Catchers: 10 Art Kusnyer; 22 Charlie Moore; 15 Darrell Porter; Infielders: 11 Kurt Bevacqua; 11 Jim Gantner; 9 Pedro García; 17 Bob Hansen; 8 Jack Heidemann; 4 Tim Johnson; 7 Don Money; 5 George Scott; 9 Gary Sutherland; 19 Robin Yount	Outfielders: 44 Hank Aaron; 17 Steve Bowling; 12 Bernie Carbo; 12 Bobby Darwin; 6 Mike Hegan; 14,28 Von Joshua; 16 Sixto Lezcano; 11 Jimmy Rosario; 26 Bill Sharp; 39 Dan Thomas; 3 Gorman Thomas	Manager: 2 Alex Grammas; Coaches: 24 Jim Bragan (third base); 32 Harvey Kuenn (first base & hitting); 38 Cal McLish (pitching); 37 Hal Smith (bullpen)

== Player stats ==
= Indicates team leader

= Indicates league leader

=== Batting ===
==== Starters by position ====
Note: Pos = Position; G = Games played; AB = At bats; H = Hits; Avg. = Batting average; HR = Home runs; RBI = Runs batted in

Pos	Player	G	AB	H	Avg.	HR	RBI
C	Darrell Porter	119	389	81	.208	5	32
1B	George Scott	156	606	166	.274	18	77
2B	Tim Johnson	105	273	75	.275	0	14
3B	Don Money	117	439	117	.267	12	62
SS	Robin Yount	161*	638	161	.252	2	54
LF	Dan Thomas	32	105	29	.276	4	15
CF	Von Joshua	107	423	113	.267	5	28
RF	Sixto Lezcano	145	513	146	.285	7	56
DH	Hank Aaron	85	271	62	.229	10	35

- Tied with Rusty Staub (Detroit) and John Mayberry (Kansas City) for league lead

==== Other batters ====
Note: G = Games played; AB = At bats; H = Hits; Avg. = Batting average; HR = Home runs; RBI = Runs batted in

Player	G	AB	H	Avg.	HR	RBI
Charlie Moore	87	241	46	.191	3	16
Gorman Thomas	99	227	45	.198	8	36
Mike Hegan	80	218	54	.248	5	31
Bernie Carbo	69	183	43	.235	3	15
Bill Sharp	78	180	44	.244	0	11
Jack Heidemann	69	146	32	.219	2	10
Gary Sutherland	59	115	25	.217	1	9
Pedro García	41	106	23	.217	1	9
Bobby Darwin	25	73	18	.247	1	5
Jim Gantner	26	69	17	.246	0	7
Bob Hansen	24	61	10	.164	0	4
Steve Bowling	14	42	7	.167	0	2
Jimmy Rosario	15	37	7	.189	1	5
Art Kusnyer	15	34	4	.118	0	3
Kurt Bevacqua	12	7	1	.143	0	0

=== Pitching ===
==== Starting pitchers ====
Note: G = Games pitched; IP = Innings pitched; W = Wins; L = Losses; ERA = Earned run average; SO = Strikeouts

Player	G	IP	W	L	ERA	SO
Jim Slaton	38	292.2	14	15	3.44	138
Bill Travers	34	240.0	15	16	2.81	120
Jim Colborn	32	225.2	9	15	3.71	101
Gary Beare	6	41.0	2	3	3.29	32

==== Other pitchers ====
Note: G = Games pitched; IP = Innings pitched; W = Wins; L = Losses; ERA = Earned run average; SO = Strikeouts

Player	G	IP	W	L	ERA	SO
Jerry Augustine	39	171.2	9	12	3.30	59
Eduardo Rodríguez	43	136.0	5	13	3.64	77
Pete Broberg	20	92.1	1	7	4.97	28
Bill Champion	10	24.1	0	1	7.03	8
Moose Haas	5	16.0	0	1	3.94	9

==== Relief pitchers ====
Note: G = Games pitched; W = Wins; L = Losses; SV = Saves; ERA = Earned run average; SO = Strikeouts

Player	G	W	L	SV	ERA	SO
Danny Frisella	32	5	2	9	2.74	43
Bill Castro	39	4	6	8	3.45	23
Ray Sadecki	36	2	0	1	4.34	27
Tom Murphy	15	0	1	1	7.36	7
Ed Sprague Sr.	3	0	2	0	7.04	0
Rick Austin	3	0	0	0	5.06	3
Kevin Kobel	3	0	1	0	11.25	1
Tom Hausman	3	0	0	0	5.40	1

== Awards and honors ==
All-Star Game

- Don Money, Third Base, Reserve
- Bill Travers, Pitcher, Reserve

== Farm system ==
The Brewers' farm system consisted of four minor league affiliates in 1976.

Level	Team	League	Manager
Triple-A	Spokane Indians	Pacific Coast League	Frank Howard
Double-A	Berkshire Brewers	Eastern League	John Felske
Class A	Burlington Bees	Midwest League	Matt Galante
Class A Short Season	Newark Co-Pilots	New York–Penn League	Tony Roig
