= Guy Hansen =

American baseball coach

Guy Christopher Hansen (born November 12, 1947) is a minor league baseball coach. Hansen most recently served as the pitching coach for the Myrtle Beach Pelicans, the Class High-A team in the Carolina League affiliated with the Atlanta Braves, in 2009. Hansen was also known as "Rock" during his pitching career.

Hansen has spent most of his career in the Kansas City Royals organization. He began there as a pitcher in 1969 with the Winnipeg Goldeyes, and continued to play in the Royals' organization until 1972, finishing his career with the Jacksonville Suns. He served as the Royals' pitching coach in 1991–93, and again in 2005, and as the bullpen coach in 1996–97. Also, he has been a scout (1981–87), and the pitching coach for several of Kansas City's farm teams, including the Eugene Emeralds of the Northwest League (1987–98), the Memphis Chicks of the Southern League (1989–90), and the Omaha Royals, then of the American Association (1991).
