= Jeff Yurak =

American baseball player (born 1954)

- Outfielder
- Born: February 26, 1954 (age 72); Pasadena, California, U.S.
- Batted: Switch Threw: Right

MLB debut
- September 15, 1978, for the Milwaukee Brewers

Last MLB appearance
- October 1, 1978, for the Milwaukee Brewers

MLB statistics
- Batting average: .000
- At bats: 5
- Walks: 1
- Stats at Baseball Reference

Teams
- Milwaukee Brewers (1978)

Jeffrey Lynn Yurak (born February 26, 1954) is an American former professional baseball player. He played five games in Major League Baseball (MLB) for the Milwaukee Brewers in 1978.

== Career ==
Yurak was drafted out of Citrus Junior College in the 24th round in 1974 by the San Francisco Giants, and was drafted from their system by the Brewers following the 1976 season. In 1978, he had his one taste of major league action, appearing in five games as a pinch hitter, playing a few innings in left field in one game.

== Sources ==
- Career statistics from Baseball Reference · Baseball Reference (Minors) · Retrosheet · Baseball Almanac
