= Andy Replogle =

American baseball player (1953–2012)

- Pitcher
- Born: October 7, 1953; South Bend, Indiana, U.S.
- Died: April 10, 2012 (aged 58); Fort Myers, Florida, U.S.
- Batted: Right Threw: Right

MLB debut
- April 11, 1978, for the Milwaukee Brewers

Last MLB appearance
- September 30, 1979, for the Milwaukee Brewers

MLB statistics
- Win–loss record: 9–5
- Earned run average: 4.00
- Strikeouts: 43
- Stats at Baseball Reference

Teams
- Milwaukee Brewers (1978–1979)

Andy Replogle (October 7, 1953 – April 10, 2012) was an American Major League Baseball pitcher. Replogle was drafted in the ninth round of the 1975 Major League Baseball draft by the St. Louis Cardinals. Previously, he was drafted by the New York Mets, but did not sign with the team. Replogle was selected by the Baltimore Orioles in the Rule 5 draft on December 5, 1977. The following year, he was selected off waivers by the Milwaukee Brewers from the Orioles, and he played two seasons with the team. Later in his career, he signed with the Cincinnati Reds, but was released from the team before he played in a regular season game with them.

Replogle played at the collegiate level at Kansas State University.
