= Randy Stein =

American baseball player (1953–2011)

- Pitcher
- Born: March 7, 1953; Pomona, California, U.S.
- Died: December 12, 2011 (aged 58); Rancho Cucamonga, California, U.S.
- Batted: Right Threw: Right

MLB debut
- April 17, 1978, for the Milwaukee Brewers

Last MLB appearance
- September 22, 1982, for the Chicago Cubs

MLB statistics
- Win–loss record: 5–6
- Earned run average: 5.72
- Strikeouts: 93
- Stats at Baseball Reference

Teams
- Milwaukee Brewers (1978); Seattle Mariners (1979, 1981); Chicago Cubs (1982)

William Randolph Stein (March 7, 1953 – December 12, 2011) was an American professional baseball player in Major League Baseball. He was a pitcher for the Milwaukee Brewers, Seattle Mariners and Chicago Cubs in parts of four seasons, between 1978 and 1982.

== Playing career ==
Stein was born in Pomona, California, to Don and Irene Stein, He graduated from Ganesha High School in Pomona. He was drafted by the Baltimore Orioles in the first round (23rd pick) of the 1971 MLB draft. The New York Yankees acquired him in May 1977. During the last week of the 1977 season while pitching in the minor leagues, he was traded to the California Angels multiple home run champion Dave Kingman. Kingman would hit four home runs for the Yankees in eight games as they secured the division title in the final week. Kingman was acquired too late to be eligible for the postseason as the Yankees won the World Series in six games over the Los Angeles Dodgers. Stein never pitched in MLB for either team and elected free agency was after the season without ever appearing in a game in the Angels system.

Stein signed with the Brewers in January 1978. He pitched in his first game in MLB on April 17 for Milwaukee. The Brewers traded him to the Mariners for Paul Mitchell on June 7, 1979. Seattle released him on April 2, 1982 and he signed with the Cubs one week later. After pitching in the majors for the final time that season, he pitched for the Triple-A Iowa Cubs in 1983.

== Personal life and death ==
After his playing career, Stein worked in the title insurance industry in the Los Angeles area.

Stein was married and had three children. He died on December 12, 2011, in Rancho Cucamonga, California, after having early-onset Alzheimer's disease.
