= Paul Mitchell (baseball) =

American baseball player (born 1949)

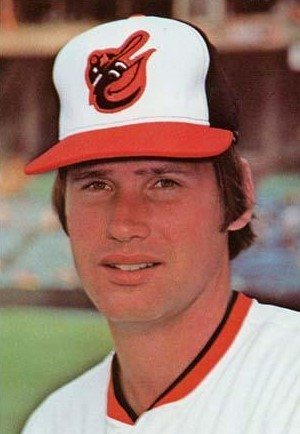
- Pitcher
- Born: August 19, 1949 (age 77); Worcester, Massachusetts, U.S.
- Batted: Right Threw: Right

MLB debut
- July 1, 1975, for the Baltimore Orioles

Last MLB appearance
- September 21, 1980, for the Milwaukee Brewers

MLB statistics
- Win–loss record: 32–39
- Earned run average: 4.45
- Strikeouts: 277
- Stats at Baseball Reference

Teams
- Baltimore Orioles (1975); Oakland Athletics (1976–1977); Seattle Mariners (1977–1979); Milwaukee Brewers (1979–1980)
Medals
Men's baseball
Representing United States
Amateur World Series
Silver medal – second place	1970 Cartagena	Team

Paul Michael Mitchell Jr. (born August 19, 1949) is an American former Major League Baseball (MLB) pitcher who played from 1975 to 1980 for the Baltimore Orioles, Oakland Athletics, Seattle Mariners and Milwaukee Brewers.

== Amateur career ==
Born in Worcester, Massachusetts, Mitchell graduated from Worcester Academy in 1968 and was selected by the Pittsburgh Pirates in the 18th round of the 1968 MLB draft. Rather than turn professional, he opted to attend Old Dominion University on a baseball scholarship. From 1969–71 he played collegiate summer baseball in the Cape Cod Baseball League (CCBL) for the Falmouth Commodores, leading Falmouth to the league championship in all three years and being named the league's outstanding pitcher in 1969 and 1970. Mitchell was selected by the Baltimore Orioles in the first round (seventh overall) of the secondary phase of the 1971 MLB draft.

== Professional career ==
Mitchell spent the 1972 season with the Double-A Asheville Orioles and 1973–74 with the Triple-A Rochester Red Wings.

He made his MLB debut for Baltimore on July 1, 1975, at Fenway Park against the Boston Red Sox and finished the season with a 3–0 record and a 3.63 earned run average in 11 games. In January of 1976, Jim Henneman of The Sporting News wrote that due to young pitchers "like Paul Mitchell and Mike Flanagan...the Orioles would no doubt be willing to sacrifice a pitcher with [Mike] Torrez's ability if it meant getting [Reggie] Jackson in return." Sure enough, the Orioles traded Torrez to the Oakland Athletics for Jackson on April 2, but they included Mitchell in the deal. Don Baylor was the third player sent over from Baltimore, and in addition to Jackson, the Orioles also acquired Ken Holtzman and minor-league right-handed pitcher Bill Van Bommel.

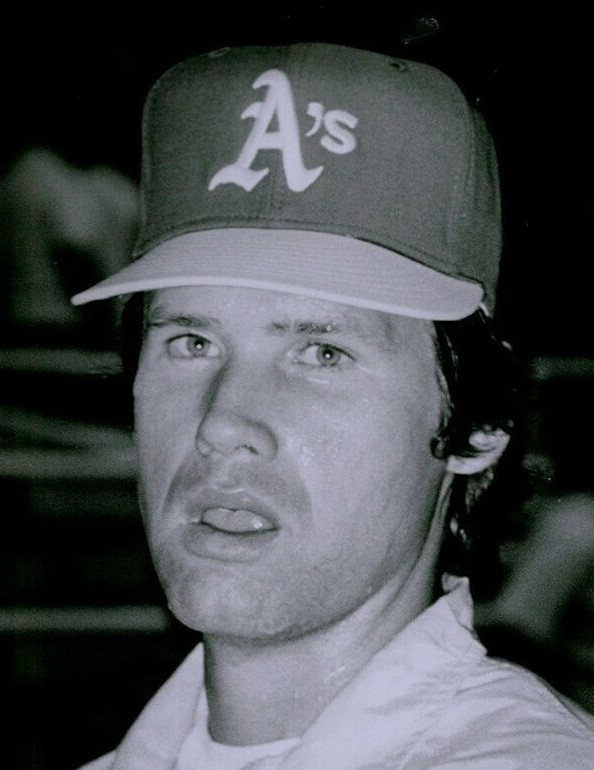
Mitchell with the Oakland Athletics in 1977

Mitchell posted a 9–7 record for Oakland in 1976 but struggled early in 1977 and was dealt mid-season to the Seattle Mariners, who had joined the American League as an expansion team for the 1977 season. In 1978, Mitchell led Seattle pitchers in wins, posting an 8–14 record for a Mariners team that lost 104 games. In 1979, Seattle traded Mitchell to the Milwaukee Brewers for Randy Stein. Mitchell made his final appearance with Milwaukee on September 21, 1980, against Seattle and was released prior to the 1981 season.

Mitchell pitched in six major league seasons, recording a career win–loss record of 32–39 in 162 appearances. He is tied with five others for the all-time major league career record for fielding percentage among pitchers who have at least 500 innings pitched. In 621 1/3 innings of work, Mitchell handled 114 chances, recording 32 putouts and 82 assists without a single error, for a perfect career fielding percentage of 1.000.

In 2002, Mitchell was inducted into the Cape Cod Baseball League Hall of Fame. In 2011, he served as honorary captain of the West Division team at the CCBL All-Star Game at Fenway Park.
