= Gary Beare =

American baseball player (born 1952)

- Pitcher
- Born: August 22, 1952 (age 74); San Diego, California, U.S.
- Batted: Right Threw: Right

MLB debut
- September 7, 1976, for the Milwaukee Brewers

Last MLB appearance
- October 1, 1977, for the Milwaukee Brewers

MLB statistics
- Win–loss record: 5–6
- Earned run average: 5.15
- Strikeouts: 64
- Stats at Baseball Reference

Teams
- Milwaukee Brewers (1976–1977)

Gary Ray Beare (born August 22, 1952) is an American former Major League Baseball pitcher who played two seasons with the Milwaukee Brewers. He batted and threw right-handed.

== Biography ==
=== Early life and education ===
Beare and attended California State University, Long Beach.

=== Baseball career ===
Beare graduated in 1970 from Kearny High School in San Diego, California. He was drafted by the Milwaukee Brewers in the 5th round of the 1974 amateur draft. He made his major league debut in September 1976 and played his last game in October 1977.
