= Bob McClure =

American baseball player and coach (born 1952)

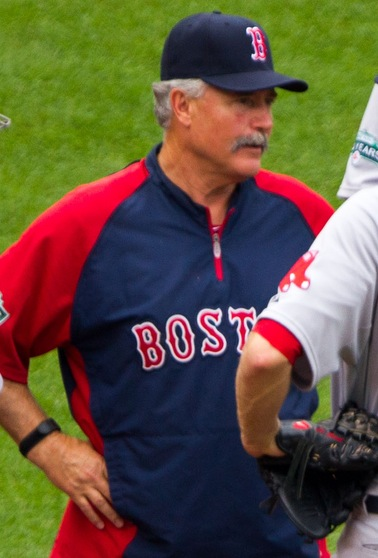
- McClure with the Boston Red Sox
- Pitcher
- Born: April 29, 1952 (age 74); Oakland, California, U.S.
- Batted: Switch Threw: Left

MLB debut
- August 13, 1975, for the Kansas City Royals

Last MLB appearance
- May 17, 1993, for the Florida Marlins

MLB statistics
- Win–loss record: 68–57
- Earned run average: 3.81
- Strikeouts: 701
- Stats at Baseball Reference

Teams
- As player: Kansas City Royals (1975–1976); Milwaukee Brewers (1977–1986); Montreal Expos (1986–1988); New York Mets (1988); California Angels (1989–1991); St. Louis Cardinals (1991–1992); Florida Marlins (1993); As coach: Florida Marlins (1994); Kansas City Royals (2006–2011); Boston Red Sox (2012); Philadelphia Phillies (2014–2017)

Career highlights and awards
- Milwaukee Brewers Wall of Honor

Robert Craig McClure (born April 29, 1952) is an American former professional baseball player and coach. He played in Major League Baseball as a left-handed pitcher from 1975 to 1993, most notably as a member of the Milwaukee Brewers with whom he won the 1982 American League pennant. Following his playing career, he has served as a coach for several MLB teams.

== Playing career ==
=== Kansas City Royals ===
McClure was born in Oakland, California, and attended Terra Nova High School in Pacifica, California, and College of San Mateo in San Mateo, California. He was both a Little League and high school teammate of Keith Hernandez. He was drafted by the Los Angeles Dodgers in the third round of the January phase of the 1973 Major League Baseball draft, however chose not to sign. Instead, he signed with the Kansas City Royals, who selected him in the secondary phase of the draft that June, also in the third round.

The Royals used McClure as a starting pitcher his first professional season in the Pioneer League in 1973. He went 10–2 with a 2.11 earned run average for the Billings Mustangs. He started in 1974 as well, and was converted to a relief pitcher in 1975. He made his major league debut with the Royals on August 13, 1975 against the Baltimore Orioles, pitching one inning, striking out one and walking one. On September 23, he entered a ballgame at Kauffman Stadium against the Texas Rangers with one out and one on in the second inning. He pitched six scoreless innings to earn his first major league win. McClure spent most of 1976 with the triple A Omaha Royals, appearing in only eight games and pitching only four innings with the big league club.

=== Milwaukee Brewers ===
On December 6, 1976, the Milwaukee Brewers sent catcher Darrell Porter and pitcher Jim Colborn to the Kansas City Royals for Jamie Quirk, Jim Wohlford and a player to be named later. On March 15, 1977, McClure was sent to the Brewers to complete the deal.

With the Brewers, McClure led his team in saves in 1978 and 1980, then spent almost all of 1981 on the disabled list with arm problems. In 1982, he was moved to the starting rotation and had a 12–7 mark for the American League champion Brewers, but he returned to the bullpen after incumbent closer Rollie Fingers was unavailable for the postseason. In the 1982 World Series against the St. Louis Cardinals, McClure made five appearances, saving Games Four and Five, but he also had two losses, including a blown save in the decisive Game Seven.

McClure came back to the Brewers starting rotation in 1983 and 1984, before returning to relief duties in 1985.

=== Montreal Expos ===
Midseason 1986, he was traded to the Montreal Expos, going 2–5 with a 3.02 ERA his first season in the National League. The following season, his record improved to 6–1 out of the Montreal bullpen.

=== New York Mets ===
McClure was 1–3 with a 6.16 ERA when the Expos released him in July 1988. He signed with the New York Mets shortly afterwards, where he was reunited with his CSM teammate Keith Hernandez, with whom he also played Little League baseball when they were younger.

=== California Angels ===
After just one season with the Mets, he was released, and signed as a free agent with the California Angels for 1989. Despite going 8–1 in his first two seasons with the Angels, McClure pitched poorly in early 1991, and was released by the Angels in June.

=== St. Louis Cardinals ===
McClure signed with the St. Louis Cardinals for the remainder of the 1991 season, and remained with the Cards through 1992. He signed with the expansion Florida Marlins for their inaugural season in 1993, and retired after being released by the Marlins in May.

== Coaching career ==
=== Colorado Rockies ===
Following his playing career, McClure worked as a pitching coach for the Colorado Rockies organization from 1999 through 2005, including four seasons at Triple-A Colorado Springs.

=== Kansas City Royals ===
For the 2006 season, new Royals manager Buddy Bell asked McClure to replace Guy Hansen as their new pitching coach. The Royals fired McClure from his pitching coach position following the 2011 season.

=== Boston Red Sox ===
In November 2011, the Boston Red Sox confirmed reports that they had hired McClure as a scout, roving minor league pitching instructor, and special assistant for player development. On December 21, 2011, McClure was promoted to pitching coach for Boston's major league team. He was fired from this position on August 20, 2012.

=== Philadelphia Phillies ===
On November 21, 2013, he was named to manager Ryne Sandberg's staff as the 2014 pitching coach of the Philadelphia Phillies, succeeding Rich Dubee.

=== Minnesota Twins ===
In January 2020, McClure was hired by the Twins to serve as their bullpen coach. However, it was subsequently announced that he was not cleared to join the Twins, following an evaluation of "the health histories of all staff members" during the COVID-19 pandemic.

Preceded by Frank Reberger	Florida Marlins bullpen coach 1994	Succeeded by Joe Breeden
Preceded by Guy Hansen	Kansas City Royals pitching coach 2006–2011	Succeeded by Dave Eiland
Preceded by Curt Young	Boston Red Sox pitching coach 2012	Succeeded by Randy Niemann
Preceded by Rich Dubee	Philadelphia Phillies pitching coach 2014–2017	Succeeded by Rick Kranitz
