= Jim Slaton =

American baseball player (born 1950)

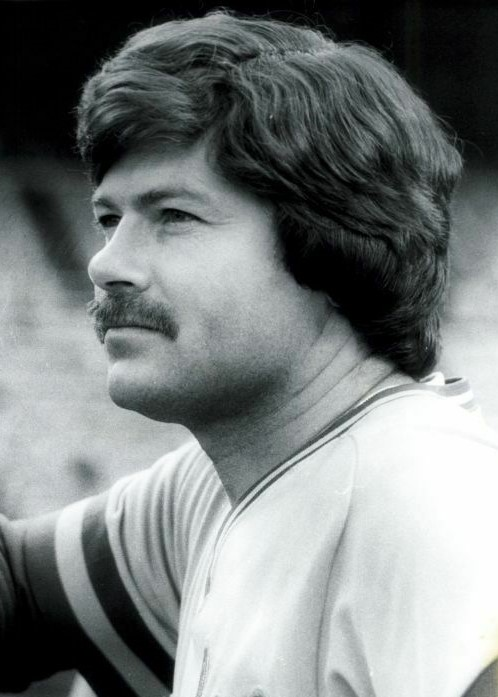
- Pitcher
- Born: June 19, 1950 (age 76); Long Beach, California, U.S.
- Batted: Right Threw: Right

MLB debut
- April 14, 1971, for the Milwaukee Brewers

Last MLB appearance
- September 28, 1986, for the Detroit Tigers

MLB statistics
- Win–loss record: 151–158
- Earned run average: 4.03
- Strikeouts: 1,191
- Stats at Baseball Reference

Teams
- Milwaukee Brewers (1971–1977); Detroit Tigers (1978); Milwaukee Brewers (1979–1983); California Angels (1984–1986); Detroit Tigers (1986)

Career highlights and awards
- All-Star (1977); Milwaukee Brewers Wall of Honor

James Michael Slaton (born June 19, 1950) is an American former pitcher with a 16-year career from 1971–1986. He played in the American League with the Milwaukee Brewers from 1971–1977 and 1979–1983, the Detroit Tigers in 1978 and 1986, and the California Angels from 1984–1986.

== Biography ==
Slaton played high school baseball at Antelope Valley High School and then played college baseball at Antelope Valley College.

He is the Brewers all-time leader in wins (117), innings pitched (2025.1), games started (268), and shutouts (19), and he is third in strikeouts, trailing Teddy Higuera and Ben Sheets, and second in complete games, trailing Mike Caldwell.

Slaton was traded with Rich Folkers from the Brewers to the Tigers for Ben Oglivie at the Winter Meetings on December 9, 1977. He then re-signed with the Brewers as a free agent the following year.

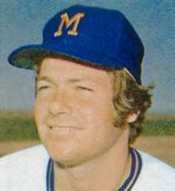
Slaton with the Milwaukee Brewers

He represented the Brewers and the American League in the 1977 All-Star game and was the winning pitcher for the Brewers in the 4th game of the 1982 World Series against St. Louis.

After his playing career ended, he started coaching in the minor leagues. He coached in the Oakland Athletics organization (1992–1994) and then became the pitching coach for the Class A Daytona Cubs (1995–1996), Lancaster JetHawks (1997–98) and the Tacoma Rainiers (1999–2003). In 2004, he was a special assignment coach for the Seattle Mariners and from 2005–2007 he was the Mariners bullpen coach. Before coaching in the minor or major leagues, Jim coached an all-star team for the Monte Vista Little League, while pitching for the Angels.

He was the pitching coach for the Las Vegas 51s in 2008, also serving briefly as the bullpen coach for the Los Angeles Dodgers when Ken Howell temporarily left the team for medical reasons. After the season, the Dodgers announced that Slaton would be the pitching coach in 2009 for their new Triple-A affiliate, the Albuquerque Isotopes, a position he held through 2010. In 2011, he was named the pitching coach at Camelback Ranch.
