= Bill Travers (baseball) =

American baseball player (born 1952)

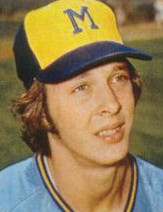
- Pitcher
- Born: October 27, 1952 (age 73); Norwood, Massachusetts, U.S.
- Batted: Left Threw: Left

MLB debut
- May 19, 1974, for the Milwaukee Brewers

Last MLB appearance
- July 17, 1983, for the California Angels

MLB statistics
- Win–loss record: 65–71
- Earned run average: 4.10
- Strikeouts: 488
- Stats at Baseball Reference

Teams
- Milwaukee Brewers (1974–1980); California Angels (1981, 1983)

Career highlights and awards
- All-Star (1976); Milwaukee Brewers Wall of Honor

William Edward Travers (born October 27, 1952) is an American former professional baseball pitcher.

== Early years ==
Travers attended Norwood High School, where he pitched three no-hitters, and was 13-0 with one save as a senior. He also played for the Norwood Post 70 American Legion team. The southpaw was drafted by the Milwaukee Brewers in the sixth round of the 1970 Major League Baseball draft five months shy of his 18th birthday.

His minor league career started off negatively (1-6, 5.62 ERA with the Midwest League's Clinton Pilots in 1970), and also started to develop arm trouble in 1972. Following operations to remove bone chips from his elbow and reroute an ulnar nerve which almost saw his career end (an operation which later became known as Tommy John surgery), Travers received his first call up to the majors in 1974. Used primarily as a long reliever in manager Del Crandall's bullpen, Travers went 2-3 with a 4.92 earned run average.

He started the following season with the triple A Sacramento Solons, however, in need of starting pitching, the Brewers called Travers up in June (Travers was one of 13 different starting pitchers Crandall used in 1975). Travers went 6-11 with a 4.48 ERA as a starter. He also made five relief appearances, and collected the only save of his career on June 21 against the Cleveland Indians.

== All-Star ==
His career took off in 1976, when he went 10-6 with a 1.91 ERA in the first half of the season. The highlight of his first half was a pitchers' duel against the New York Yankees' Dock Ellis at Yankee Stadium. Ellis held the Brewers to one run on four hits. Travers, meanwhile, pitched a four-hit shutout, in which he also collected a season high eight strikeouts. He also pitched shutouts against the Chicago White Sox & California Angels on his way to the only All-Star nod of his career. He sputtered in the second half, however, going 5-10 with a 3.92 ERA. For the season, he led his team with 15 victories and a 2.81 ERA. His 240 innings pitched were a career high.

== Injuries ==
Travers was named the 1977 Opening Day starter, and started the season 3-4 with a 3.23 ERA, until injuries once again derailed his career. After nearly two months on the disabled list, Travers returned in late July, but was highly ineffective. He went 1-8 with a 6.82 ERA over the remainder of the season. The low point of his season came on August 14 in the second game of a doubleheader with the Indians. Regardless of his ineffectiveness and history of arm trouble, Brewers manager Alex Grammas left Travers in the game for 155 pitches. He finally left the game in the eighth inning, having surrendered 14 earned runs.

Travers underwent a second ulnar transfer operation during the off-season, this time under Dr. Frank Jobe, the doctor who became famous for performing Tommy John's successful surgery. He returned to the Brewers under new manager George Bamberger in May 1978, and went 12-11 with a 4.41 ERA in 28 starts.

Travers returned to ace form in 1979, going 14-8 with a 3.89 ERA to help the Brewers to a second-place finish in the American League East for the first time in franchise history. He repeated this success in 1980, going 12-6 with a 3.91 ERA.

== California Angels ==
Travers signed a four-year free agent contract with the California Angels on January 26, 1981. He faced just one batter in his fourth start with his new club, walking Yankees second baseman Willie Randolph on four pitches before he needed to be pulled from the game. Calcium deposits were found in his pitching elbow. He sat out the remainder of the season in an unsuccessful attempt to let the injury heal. He had surgery during the off season to have the calcium deposits removed, causing him to miss the entire 1982 season in which the Angels captured the American League West.

Travers returned to the mound for the Angels on May 10, 1983. He made ten appearances, going 0-3 with a 5.91 ERA before he was released.

== Career stats ==
W	L	Pct	ERA	G	GS	CG	SHO	SV	IP	H	ER	R	HR	BB	K	WP	HBP	BAA	Fld%
65	71	.478	4.10	205	168	46	10	1	1120.2	1139	511	575	134	415	488	44	44	.265	.947

His only career plate appearance came against the New York Yankees on July 29, 1979. He successfully sacrificed Jim Wohlford over to second. He pitched for the Senior Professional Baseball Association's St. Lucie Legends in 1989. He was an inaugural inductee into the Milwaukee Brewers "Wall of Honor" in 2014.

== Personal life ==
Travers married his wife whom he met during high school, Linda, and had a daughter named Tiffany. His father was a semi-pro catcher, who later served as a police officer in Norwood for 38 years.

Travers is also a candlepin bowler. He's made appearances on Channel 5's Candlepin Bowling show in Boston, and was on the 1998 USA team that won the World Championships.
