= Jerry Augustine =

American baseball player (born 1952)

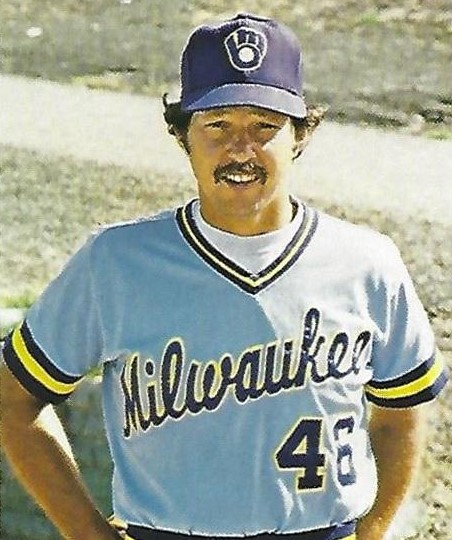
- Pitcher
- Born: July 24, 1952 (age 72); Kewaunee, Wisconsin, U.S.
- Batted: Left Threw: Left

MLB debut
- September 9, 1975, for the Milwaukee Brewers

Last MLB appearance
- April 11, 1984, for the Milwaukee Brewers

MLB statistics
- Win–loss record: 55–59
- Earned run average: 4.23
- Strikeouts: 348
- Stats at Baseball Reference

Teams
- Milwaukee Brewers (1975–1984)

Career highlights and awards
- Milwaukee Brewers Wall of Honor

Gerald Lee Augustine (born July 24, 1952) is an American former professional baseball pitcher, who played in Major League Baseball (MLB) for the Milwaukee Brewers, from 1975 to 1984.

Augustine formerly coached baseball for the University of Wisconsin–Milwaukee Panthers. Currently, he is a studio analyst for the Brewers on Bally Sports Wisconsin.

Augustine's nephew, James Augustine, played professional basketball for the Orlando Magic.

== See also ==
- List of Major League Baseball players who spent their entire career with one franchise
