= Moose Haas =

American baseball player (born 1956)

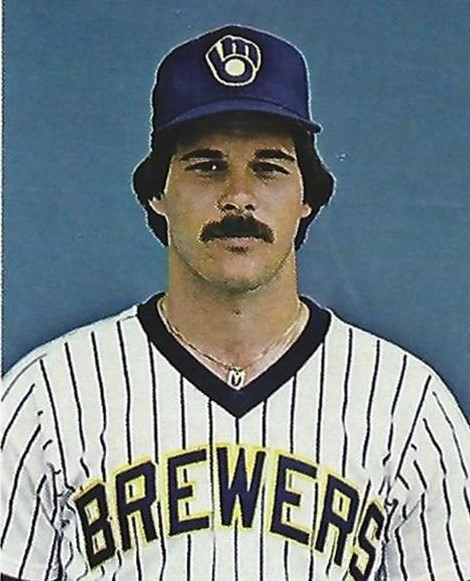
- Pitcher
- Born: April 22, 1956 (age 70); Baltimore, Maryland, U.S.
- Batted: Right Threw: Right

MLB debut
- September 8, 1976, for the Milwaukee Brewers

Last MLB appearance
- June 19, 1987, for the Oakland Athletics

MLB statistics
- Win–loss record: 100–83
- Earned run average: 4.01
- Strikeouts: 853
- Stats at Baseball Reference

Teams
- Milwaukee Brewers (1976–1985); Oakland Athletics (1986–1987)

Career highlights and awards
- Milwaukee Brewers Wall of Honor

Bryan Edmund "Moose" Haas (born April 22, 1956) is an American former professional baseball player who pitched in Major League Baseball (MLB) from 1976 to 1987. He appeared in the 1982 World Series as a member of the Milwaukee Brewers.

== Early life ==
Haas was born on April 22, 1956, in Baltimore, Maryland. He attended Franklin High School (Reisterstown, Maryland) located in Baltimore County, where he was a star pitcher on the baseball team. He was a dominating pitcher as early as his sophomore year. As a high school senior, he had a 7–0 won–loss record with a 0.00 earned run average (ERA) and two no-hitters. During his high school years, he struck out two-thirds of the batters he faced.

Haas played amateur baseball as a young teen for legendary Baltimore coach Sterling "Sheriff" Fowble, who coached other future major leaguers such as Hall of Fame player Al Kaline and Ron Swoboda. He is one of a handful of major league players from Baltimore County to play in the World Series.

Haas had the lifelong nickname "Moose". The 6-ft, 180 pound Haas publicly stated that his father gave him that nickname upon birth: "My father gave it to me when I was born. I wasn't that big, only seven and a quarter pounds, but I guess I looked to my father like I was going to be big. It didn't work out."

== Baseball career ==
Haas initially signed a letter of intent to play college baseball at Clemson before being drafted in the second round of the 1974 Major League Baseball draft by the Brewers. At 18 years old, in 1974, he played minor league baseball for the Newark Co-Pilots. The following year he played for the Burlington Bees, and in 1976 played Triple-A baseball for the Spokane Indians under manager Frank Howard. At the age of 20, he was called up to play for the Brewers in 1976, playing in five games.

In 1977, Haas started 32 games for the Brewers, with a 10–12 record and 4.55 ERA. He began the 1978 season strong. On April 12, 1978, Haas struck out 14 New York Yankees, including Reggie Jackson four times, breaking the record for strikeouts in a single game for the Brewers. This franchise record stood for 26 years until it was broken by Ben Sheets. He won the game over future Hall of Fame relief pitcher Goose Gossage, pitching a complete game five-hitter.

Later in April, he suffered an arm injury, and did not pitch again until the end of the 1978 season. Haas pitched only 30.2 innings for the year, after having pitched 197.2 innings in 1977. Haas rebounded in 1979, starting 28 games, with an 11–11 record and 4.78 ERA in 184.2 innings pitched. In 1980, he had a career high 252.1 innings pitched. He also had career bests as a full-time starter with 16 wins, a 3.10 ERA, 33 starts, 14 complete games, three shutouts,146 strikeouts and a 4.5 WAR (wins above replacement).

In the strike-shortened 1981 season, with the Brewers playing only 109 regular season games, Haas was 11–7, with a 4.46 ERA in 137.1 innings pitched. The Brewers lost to the Yankees in the American League Division Series, where Haas lost two games, including Game 1 and the deciding Game 5. Before the series began, Haas had beaten the Yankees in five of six previous decisions.

In 1982, the Brewers went all the way to the World Series, first defeating the California Angels three games to two in the American League Championship Series (ALCS), after losing the first two games of the ALCS. They lost the World Series to the St. Louis Cardinals, four games to three. During the regular season, Haas was 11–8, with a 4.47 ERA. He was the winning pitcher in Game 4 of the ALCS. He started Game 4 of the World Series and did not have a decision, though the Brewers won the game. He pitched two innings in relief in the deciding Game 7, giving up two runs, but was again not involved in the decision.

After two years in the playoffs, the Brewers fell to fifth place in the AL Eastern Division in 1983. But Haas led the American League in pitcher winning percentage (.813) with 13 wins and 3 losses. He had a 3.27 ERA, seven complete games in 25 starts and three shutouts. In 1984–85, Haas respectively went 9–11 with a 3.99 ERA and 8–8 with a 3.84 ERA for the Brewers, starting 56 of the 58 games in which he appeared.

Haas spent the first ten seasons of his career in Milwaukee before being traded to the Oakland Athletics in 1986 for Steve Kiefer, Charlie O'Brien and two minor league players, where he played the final two years of his career, retiring in 1987. In 1986, he was 7–2 with a 2.74 ERA in 12 starts and 72.1 innings pitched. This was the first time in his career his ERA had been below 3.00 in a season.

Haas grew up a fan of the Baltimore Orioles, and one of his most memorable baseball experiences came when he shut the Orioles out at Baltimore's Memorial Stadium (which no longer exists). In earlier years, he was not successful in games against the Orioles at Memorial Stadium and felt pressure pitching there.

For his career, Haas had 100 wins and 83 losses, with a 4.01 ERA. In 1980, he was the Brewers pitcher of the year, with a 16–15 record and 3.11 ERA.

== Honors ==
In 1992, he was inducted into the Maryland Athletic Hall of Fame. He has a plaque on the Milwaukee Brewers Wall of Honor.
