= Mike Caldwell (baseball) =

American baseball player (born 1949)

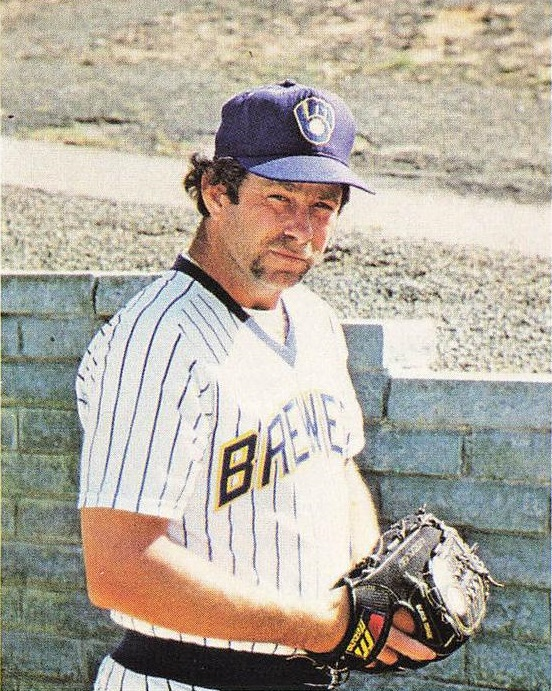
- Pitcher
- Born: January 22, 1949 (age 77); Tarboro, North Carolina, U.S.
- Batted: Right Threw: Left

MLB debut
- September 4, 1971, for the San Diego Padres

Last MLB appearance
- September 25, 1984, for the Milwaukee Brewers

MLB statistics
- Win–loss record: 137–130
- Earned run average: 3.81
- Strikeouts: 939
- Stats at Baseball Reference

Teams
- San Diego Padres (1971–1973); San Francisco Giants (1974–1976); Cincinnati Reds (1977); Milwaukee Brewers (1977–1984)

Career highlights and awards
- Milwaukee Brewers Wall of Honor

Ralph Michael Caldwell (born January 22, 1949) is an American former professional baseball left-handed pitcher.

== Career ==
Caldwell was drafted in the 12th round of the 1971 amateur draft by the San Diego Padres after graduating from North Carolina State University, where he played college baseball for the Wolfpack. He made his major league debut on September 4, 1971, against the Atlanta Braves. His Padres won‐lost record of 13–25 included a second full major‐league season in 1973 in which he was mostly a relief pitcher who went 5–14 with a 3.74 earned run average (ERA). He was traded from the Padres to the San Francisco Giants for Willie McCovey and Bernie Williams on October 25, 1973. The Giants were desperate for more left‐handed pitchers beyond Ron Bryant.

Caldwell was traded again in 1976, this time to the St. Louis Cardinals with John D'Acquisto and Dave Rader for Willie Crawford, Vic Harris and John Curtis. Before the start of the 1977 season, Caldwell was traded for the third time, going to the Cincinnati Reds for Pat Darcy. After just 14 games, the Reds traded him to the Milwaukee Brewers for minor leaguers Dick O'Keeffe and Garry Pyka.

Caldwell had his best season in 1978 when he went 22–9 with a 2.36 ERA and led the AL in complete games with 23. Caldwell was named the AL Comeback Player of the Year by The Sporting News and finished second in the Cy Young Award balloting to Ron Guidry. Caldwell finished in double figures in victories for six consecutive seasons for the Brewers (1978–1983) and won two games in the 1982 World Series against the St. Louis Cardinals in a losing effort, the first win being a complete game shutout in game 1. Caldwell was given his unconditional release by the Brewers organization in 1985. Caldwell, as of 2019, is still the Brewers' all-time leader in wins by a left-handed pitcher, with 102.

In 1978, he was one of the three left-handed pitchers named "Mike" (the others being Mike Flanagan and Mike Willis) to hand the New York Yankees' Ron Guidry a loss in his 25–3 season. He and the Brewers shut out the New York Yankees and Guidry 6–0 on July 7, 1978. During his prime years in Milwaukee, Caldwell was known as a "Yankee killer", and proved to be very successful against them. From 1977 to 1982, Caldwell was 12–5 with a 2.66 ERA against the Yankees.

Caldwell threw mainly a sinker and a regular fastball, relying on control and varying speeds of pitches to get outs, rather than overpowering hitters. In his entire MLB career, Caldwell struck out 100 or more batters in a full-season only twice.

In the book Nine Innings the author, Daniel Okrent, wrote of Caldwell, "He seemed at times to want the baseball world to perceive him as an ape. He was foul-mouthed and foul-tempered, a vicious and constant bench jockey whose most common dugout word was "cocksucker", usually directed, with considerable volume, at the umpires." Okrent further writes that, "Caldwell was unshaven, and the utter absence of even a momentary smile on his visage earned him the nickname "Mr. Warmth" (he even wore a t-shirt emblazoned: MR. FUCKING WARMTH). (Pg. 81, Nine Innings by Daniel Okrent, Ticknor & Fields, 1985).
