= 1978 Toronto Blue Jays season =

1978 Toronto Blue Jays
- League: American League
- Division: East
- Ballpark: Exhibition Stadium
- City: Toronto
- Record: 59–102 (.364)
- Divisional place: 7th
- Owners: Labatt Breweries, Imperial Trust, Canadian Imperial Bank of Commerce
- General managers: Pat Gillick
- Managers: Roy Hartsfield
- Television: CBC Television (Don Chevrier, Tony Kubek, Tom McKee); CBFT (Jean-Pierre Roy, Guy Ferron)
- Radio: CKFH (Early Wynn, Tom Cheek)

The 1978 Toronto Blue Jays season was the franchise's second season of Major League Baseball. It resulted in the Blue Jays finishing seventh in the American League East with a record of 59 wins and 102 losses.

== Offseason ==
=== Transactions ===
Transactions by the Toronto Blue Jays during the off-season before the 1978 season.

==== October 1977 ====
| October 25 | Released Phil Roof. |
| October 31 | Purchased Joe Henderson from the Cincinnati Reds. |

==== November 1977 ====
| November 11 | Signed free agent Luis Gómez from the Minnesota Twins to a contract. |

==== December 1977 ====
| December 5 | Selected Willie Upshaw from the New York Yankees in the 1977 MLB Rule 5 draft. |
| December 6 | Acquired Tom Underwood and Víctor Cruz from the St. Louis Cardinals for Pete Vuckovich and a player to be named later (John Scott on December 16, 1977). |
| December 8 | Acquired Pat Kelly and Butch Alberts from the California Angels for Ron Fairly. Purchased Tommy Hutton from the Philadelphia Phillies. |

==== January 1978 ====
| January 1 | Acquired Mike Cosgrove from the Cleveland Indians in an unknown transaction. |
| January 16 | Signed free agent Mark DeJohn of the New York Mets to a contract. |

==== February 1978 ====
| February 15 | Signed free agent Luis Meléndez from the San Diego Padres to a contract. |
| February 25 | Purchased Steve Grilli from the Detroit Tigers. |

==== March 1978 ====
| March 14 | Signed Charlie Puleo as an amateur free agent. |
| March 15 | Acquired Rico Carty from the Cleveland Indians for Dennis DeBarr. Acquired Rick Bosetti from the St. Louis Cardinals for Tom Bruno and cash. |
| March 18 | Released Doug Rader. |
| March 22 | Released Jerry Johnson. |
| March 23 | Acquired Mickey Scott from the California Angels for Mike Cosgrove. |
| March 25 | Acquired Sheldon Mallory from the Oakland Athletics for Steve Staggs. |
| March 27 | Released Héctor Torres. Selected Larry Demery off of waivers from the Pittsburgh Pirates. |
| March 29 | Released Joe Henderson. Purchased Mike Stanton from the Houston Astros. |
| March 31 | Signed free agent Dave Wallace from the Philadelphia Phillies to a contract. Returned Larry Demery to the Pittsburgh Pirates following previous waiver transaction. |

== Regular season ==
=== Opening Day starters ===
- Alan Ashby
- Bob Bailor
- Rick Bosetti
- Rico Carty
- Jerry Garvin
- Luis Gómez
- Roy Howell
- Tommy Hutton
- John Mayberry
- Dave McKay
- Dave Lemanczyk

=== Season standings ===
AL East
| Team | W | L | Pct. | GB | Home | Road |
|---|---|---|---|---|---|---|
| New York Yankees | 100 | 63 | .613 | — | 55‍–‍26 | 45‍–‍37 |
| Boston Red Sox | 99 | 64 | .607 | 1 | 59‍–‍23 | 40‍–‍41 |
| Milwaukee Brewers | 93 | 69 | .574 | 6½ | 54‍–‍27 | 39‍–‍42 |
| Baltimore Orioles | 90 | 71 | .559 | 9 | 51‍–‍30 | 39‍–‍41 |
| Detroit Tigers | 86 | 76 | .531 | 13½ | 47‍–‍34 | 39‍–‍42 |
| Cleveland Indians | 69 | 90 | .434 | 29 | 42‍–‍36 | 27‍–‍54 |
| Toronto Blue Jays | 59 | 102 | .366 | 40 | 37‍–‍44 | 22‍–‍58 |

=== Record vs. opponents ===
1978 American League record Sources:
| Team | BAL | BOS | CAL | CWS | CLE | DET | KC | MIL | MIN | NYY | OAK | SEA | TEX | TOR |
|---|---|---|---|---|---|---|---|---|---|---|---|---|---|---|
| Baltimore | — | 7–8 | 4–6 | 8–1 | 9–6 | 7–8 | 2–8 | 7–8 | 5–5 | 6–9 | 11–0 | 9–1 | 7–4 | 8–7 |
| Boston | 8–7 | — | 9–2 | 7–3 | 7–8 | 12–3 | 4–6 | 10–5 | 9–2 | 7–9 | 5–5 | 7–3 | 3–7 | 11–4 |
| California | 6–4 | 2–9 | — | 8–7 | 6–4 | 4–7 | 9–6 | 5–5 | 12–3 | 5–5 | 9–6 | 9–6 | 5–10 | 7–3 |
| Chicago | 1–8 | 3–7 | 7–8 | — | 8–2 | 2–9 | 8–7 | 4–7 | 8–7 | 1–9 | 7–8 | 7–8 | 11–4 | 4–6 |
| Cleveland | 6–9 | 8–7 | 4–6 | 2–8 | — | 5–10 | 5–6 | 5–10 | 5–5 | 6–9 | 4–6 | 8–1 | 1–9 | 10–4 |
| Detroit | 8–7 | 3–12 | 7–4 | 9–2 | 10–5 | — | 4–6 | 7–8 | 4–6 | 4–11 | 6–4 | 8–2 | 7–3 | 9–6 |
| Kansas City | 8–2 | 6–4 | 6–9 | 7–8 | 6–5 | 6–4 | — | 6–4 | 7–8 | 6–5 | 10–5 | 12–3 | 7–8 | 5–5 |
| Milwaukee | 8–7 | 5–10 | 5–5 | 7–4 | 10–5 | 8–7 | 4–6 | — | 4–7 | 10–5 | 9–1 | 5–5 | 6–4 | 12–3 |
| Minnesota | 5–5 | 2–9 | 3–12 | 7–8 | 5–5 | 6–4 | 8–7 | 7–4 | — | 3–7 | 9–6 | 6–9 | 6–9 | 6–4 |
| New York | 9–6 | 9–7 | 5–5 | 9–1 | 9–6 | 11–4 | 5–6 | 5–10 | 7–3 | — | 8–2 | 6–5 | 6–4 | 11–4 |
| Oakland | 0–11 | 5–5 | 6–9 | 8–7 | 6–4 | 4–6 | 5–10 | 1–9 | 6–9 | 2–8 | — | 13–2 | 6–9 | 7–4 |
| Seattle | 1–9 | 3–7 | 6–9 | 8–7 | 1–8 | 2–8 | 3–12 | 5–5 | 9–6 | 5–6 | 2–13 | — | 3–12 | 8–2 |
| Texas | 4–7 | 7–3 | 10–5 | 4–11 | 9–1 | 3–7 | 8–7 | 4–6 | 9–6 | 4–6 | 9–6 | 12–3 | — | 4–7 |
| Toronto | 7–8 | 4–11 | 3–7 | 6–4 | 4–10 | 6–9 | 5–5 | 3–12 | 4–6 | 4–11 | 4–7 | 2–8 | 7–4 | — |

=== Transactions ===
Transactions for the Toronto Blue Jays during the 1978 regular season.

==== April 1978 ====
| April 4 | Purchased John Mayberry from the Kansas City Royals. |
| April 10 | Released Mark DeJohn. |
| April 11 | Purchased Don Kirkwood from the Chicago White Sox. |
| April 13 | Purchased Balor Moore from the California Angels. |
| April 28 | Acquired Tim Johnson from the Milwaukee Brewers for Tim Nordbrook. |

==== May 1978 ====
| May 13 | Signed free agent Tom Buskey from the Texas Rangers as a free agent. |
| May 22 | Purchased Joe Coleman from the Oakland Athletics. |

==== July 1978 ====
| July 20 | Sold player rights of Tommy Hutton to the Montreal Expos. |

==== August 1978 ====
| August 15 | Acquired Willie Horton and Phil Huffman from the Oakland Athletics for Rico Carty. |

==== September 1978 ====
| September 12 | Acquired Mark Wiley from the San Diego Padres for Andy Dyes. |
| September 12 | Purchased Dale Mohorcic from the Victoria Mussels of the Northwest League. |

=== Roster ===
1978 Toronto Blue Jays
Roster
| Pitchers: 44 Tom Buskey; 18 Jim Clancy; 40,16 Joe Coleman; 47 Víctor Cruz; 36 Jerry Garvin; 34 Jesse Jefferson; 32 Don Kirkwood; 23 Dave Lemanczyk; 38 Balor Moore; 45 Tom Murphy; 24 Tom Underwood; 46 Dave Wallace; 21 Mark Wiley; 33 Mike Willis | Catchers: 8 Alan Ashby; 9 Rick Cerone; 3 Brian Milner; 12 Ernie Whitt; Infielders: 25 Doug Ault; 11 Luis Gómez; 13 Roy Howell; 16,17 Tim Johnson; 29 Garth Iorg; 10 John Mayberry; 39 Dave McKay; 16 Tim Nordbrook | Outfielders: 1 Bob Bailor; 22 Rick Bosetti; 5 Sam Ewing; 14 Tommy Hutton; 26 Willie Upshaw; 19 Otto Vélez; 20 Alvis Woods; 35 Gary Woods; Other batters: 14 Butch Alberts; 20 Rico Carty; 48 Willie Horton | Manager: 7 Roy Hartsfield; Coaches: 31 Bobby Doerr (Hitting); 43 Don Leppert (First base); 15 Bob Miller (Pitching); 42 Jackie Moore (Third base); 41 Harry Warner (Bullpen) |

=== Game log ===
1978 Game Log 59–102 (Home 37–44, Away 22–58)
April: 8–13 (Home 4–7, Away 4–6)

| # | Date | Opponent | Score | Win | Loss | Save | Attendance | Record |
|---|---|---|---|---|---|---|---|---|
| – | April 6 | @ Tigers | Postponed (rain) Rescheduled for April 7 | | | | | |
| 1 | April 7 | @ Tigers | 2–6 | Fidrych (1–0) | Lemanczyk (0–1) | | 52,528 | 0–1 |
| 2 | April 8 | @ Tigers | 5–2 | Garvin (1–0) | Slaton (0–1) | Willis (1) | 12,413 | 1–1 |
| 3 | April 9 | @ Tigers | 4–8 | Billingham (1–0) | Underwood (0–1) | Faucault (1) | 9,169 | 1–2 |
| 4 | April 11 | @ White Sox | 5–9 | Kravec (1–0) | Jefferson (0–1) | Torrealba (1) | 3,347 | 1–3 |
| 5 | April 12 | @ White Sox | 4–5 | Stone (1–0) | Lemanczyk (0–2) | LaGrow (2) | 5,742 | 1–4 |
| 6 | April 14 | Tigers | 10–8 | Kirkwood (1–0) | Wilcox (0–1) | Murphy (1) | 35,761 | 2–4 |
| 7 | April 15 | Tigers | 3–6 | Billingham (2–0) | Willis (0–1) | Faucault (2) | 15,024 | 2–5 |
| 8 | April 16 | Tigers | 3–4 | Crawford (1–0) | Clancy (0–1) | | 17,088 | 2–6 |
| 9 | April 17 | Royals | 1–2 | Gura (1–0) | Jefferson (0–2) | Hrabosky (3) | 10,169 | 2–7 |
| 10 | April 18 | Royals | 0–5 | Splittorff (3–0) | Lemanczyk (0–3) | | 10,218 | 2–8 |
| 11 | April 19 | Yankees | 4–3 | Murphy (1–0) | Gossage (0–3) | | 13,306 | 3–8 |
| – | April 20 | Yankees | Postponed (rain) Rescheduled for September 20 | | | | | |
| 12 | April 21 | White Sox | 2–11 | Barrios (1–1) | Underwood (0–2) | LaGrow (3) | 10,108 | 3–9 |
| 13 | April 22 | White Sox | 4–2 | Clancy (1–1) | Wood (0–3) | Willis (2) | 44,327 | 4–9 |
| 14 | April 23 | White Sox | 4–0 | Jefferson (1–2) | Stone (1–1) | | 17,427 | 5–9 |
| 15 | April 24 | Indians | 2–4 | Hood (1–0) | Lemanczyk (0–4) | Kern (1) | 10,776 | 5–10 |
| 16 | April 25 | Indians | 5–6 | Garland (2–2) | Garvin (1–1) | Kinney (2) | 11,348 | 5–11 |
| 17 | April 26 | @ Royals | 3–1 | Murphy (2–0) | Splittorff (4–1) | | 19,545 | 6–11 |
| 18 | April 27 | @ Royals | 8–7 | Moore (1–0) | Bird (1–1) | Willis (3) | 17,422 | 7–11 |
| 19 | April 28 | @ Angels | 4–5 | Miller (1–0) | Jefferson (1–3) | LaRoche (5) | 16,575 | 7–12 |
| 20 | April 29 | @ Angels | 0–5 | Ryan (1–1) | Lemanczyk (0–5) | | 24,354 | 7–13 |
| 21 | April 30 | @ Angels | 9–3 | Garvin (2–1) | Knapp (3–2) | | 27,367 | 8–13 |

May: 9–18 (Home 7–7, Away 2–11)

| # | Date | Opponent | Score | Win | Loss | Save | Attendance | Record |
|---|---|---|---|---|---|---|---|---|
| 22 | May 2 | @ Athletics | 1–2 | Keough (2–0) | Underwood (0–3) | Sosa (4) | 5,663 | 8–14 |
| 23 | May 3 | @ Athletics | 3–11 | Broberg (4–0) | Clancy (1–2) | Lacey (2) | 2,512 | 8–15 |
| 24 | May 5 | @ Mariners | 1–9 | Honeycutt (2–3) | Jefferson (1–4) | | 4,824 | 8–16 |
| 25 | May 6 | @ Mariners | 0–6 | Mitchell (2–3) | Lemanczyk (0–6) | | 7,589 | 8–17 |
| 26 | May 7 | @ Mariners | 9–7 | Romo (3–0) | Willis (0–2) | | 12,489 | 8–18 |
| – | May 8 | Athletics | Postponed (rain) Rescheduled for July 21 | | | | | |
| 27 | May 9 | Athletics | 4–0 | Underwood (1–3) | Broberg (4–1) | | 11,339 | 9–18 |
| 28 | May 10 | Athletics | 3–1 | Clancy (2–2) | Langford (0–2) | | 21,766 | 10–18 |
| 29 | May 12 | Mariners | 8–3 | Jefferson (2–4) | Rawley (0–3) | | 11,518 | 11–18 |
| 30 | May 13 | Mariners | 6–9 | Pole (3–4) | Lemanczyk (0–7) | Romo (3) | 21,350 | 11–19 |
| – | May 14 | Mariners | Postponed (rain) Rescheduled for July 24 | | | | | |
| 31 | May 15 | Angels | 10–6 | Moore (2–0) | Hartzell (0–3) | | 11,295 | 12–19 |
| 32 | May 16 | Angels | 5–4 | Willis (1–2) | Aase (2–2) | Murphy (2) | 12,044 | 13–19 |
| – | May 17 | @ Orioles | Postponed (rain) Rescheduled for July 5 | | | | | |
| 33 | May 18 | @ Orioles | 3–5 | Flanagan (4–3) | Clancy (2–3) | | 4,255 | 13–20 |
| 34 | May 19 | Yankees | 3–11 | Tidrow (2–3) | Jefferson (2–5) | | 26,025 | 13–21 |
| 35 | May 20 | Yankees | 10–8 | Lemanczyk (1–7) | Clay (0–2) | | 30,550 | 14–21 |
| 36 | May 21 | Yankees | 1–2 | Figueroa (5–1) | Underwood (1–4) | Gossage (6) | | 14–22 |
| 37 | May 21 | Yankees | 1–9 | Clay (1–2) | Garvin (2–2) | | 41,308 | 14–23 |
| 38 | May 22 | Red Sox | 4–5 | Ripley (1–3) | Clancy (2–4) | Stanley (3) | 25,054 | 14–24 |
| 39 | May 23 | Red Sox | 2–1 (12) | Jefferson (3–5) | Campbell (2–4) | | 14,578 | 15–24 |
| 40 | May 24 | Red Sox | 2–8 | Torrez (6–2) | Lemanczyk (1–8) | | 28,825 | 15–25 |
| 41 | May 25 | Red Sox | 5–9 | Eckersley (4–1) | Underwood (1–5) | Drago (4) | 17,197 | 15–26 |
| 42 | May 26 | @ Yankees | 3–4 | Lyle (3–1) | Garvin (2–3) | | 24,171 | 15–27 |
| 43 | May 27 | @ Yankees | 4–1 | Clancy (3–4) | Figueroa (5–2) | Murphy (3) | 56,078 | 16–27 |
| 44 | May 28 | @ Yankees | 3–5 | Guidry (7–0) | Jefferson (3–6) | | 41,534 | 16–28 |
| 45 | May 28 | @ Yankees | 5–6 (13) | Gossage (3–4) | Murphy (2–1) | | 42,344 | 16–29 |
| 46 | May 29 | @ Red Sox | 4–5 | Torrez (7–2) | Underwood (1–6) | | 25,935 | 16–30 |
| 47 | May 30 | @ Red Sox | 0–4 | Eckersley (5–1) | Garvin (2–4) | | 25,853 | 16–31 |
| 48 | May 31 | @ Red Sox | 6–2 | Clancy (4–4) | Lee (7–2) | | 27,945 | 17–31 |

June: 9–17 (Home 6–8, Away 3–9)

| # | Date | Opponent | Score | Win | Loss | Save | Attendance | Record |
|---|---|---|---|---|---|---|---|---|
| 49 | June 2 | Rangers | 3–1 | Jefferson (4–6) | Matlack (5–6) | | 25,273 | 18–31 |
| 50 | June 3 | Rangers | 4–3 | Underwood (2–6) | Umbarger (2–5) | Murphy (4) | 32,021 | 19–31 |
| 51 | June 4 | Rangers | 5–9 | Ellis (4–2) | Lemanczyk (1–9) | Comer (1) | 28,374 | 19–32 |
| – | June 7 | @ Indians | Postponed (rain) Rescheduled for June 25 | | | | | |
| – | June 7 | @ Indians | Postponed (rain) Rescheduled for September 11 | | | | | |
| 52 | June 9 | @ Brewers | 2–3 (10) | Caldwell (6–3) | Murphy (2–2) | | 9,959 | 19–33 |
| 53 | June 10 | @ Brewers | 0–5 | Travers (3–2) | Garvin (2–5) | | 25,889 | 19–34 |
| 54 | June 11 | @ Brewers | 1–2 | Sorensen (8–4) | Underwood (2–7) | | | 19–35 |
| 55 | June 11 | @ Brewers | 4–5 | Stein (2–1) | Murphy (2–3) | | 21,568 | 19–36 |
| – | June 12 | Twins | Postponed (rain) Rescheduled for June 13 | | | | | |
| 56 | June 13 | Twins | 0–2 | Goltz (3–4) | Moore (2–1) | Marshall (8) | | 19–37 |
| 57 | June 13 | Twins | 2–7 | Zahn (6–4) | Clancy (4–5) | | 14,489 | 19–38 |
| 58 | June 14 | Brewers | 5–7 | Castro (2–0) | Murphy (2–4) | | | 19–39 |
| 59 | June 14 | Brewers | 0–5 | Augustine (6–8) | Garvin (2–6) | | 28,346 | 19–40 |
| 60 | June 16 | @ Rangers | 8–3 | Underwood (3–7) | Ellis (5–3) | | | 20–40 |
| 61 | June 16 | @ Rangers | 5–2 | Jefferson (5–6) | Moret (0–1) | Murphy (5) | 20,660 | 21–40 |
| 62 | June 17 | @ Rangers | 2–13 | Jenkins (7–3) | Clancy (4–6) | | 30,033 | 21–41 |
| 63 | June 18 | @ Rangers | 2–3 | Cleveland (2–3) | Murphy (2–5) | | 24,645 | 21–42 |
| 64 | June 20 | Tigers | 3–4 (13) | Hiller (6–3) | Willis (1–3) | | 31,625 | 21–43 |
| 65 | June 21 | Tigers | 8–10 | Crawford (2–2) | Kirkwood (1–1) | Foucault (4) | 29,439 | 21–44 |
| 66 | June 23 | @ Indians | 3–8 | Waits (5–7) | Jefferson (5–7) | | 6,514 | 21–45 |
| 67 | June 24 | @ Indians | 3–12 | Paxton (4–4) | Clancy (4–7) | | 7,176 | 21–46 |
| 68 | June 25 | @ Indians | 2–1 | Moore (3–1) | Clyde (4–3) | Cruz (1) | | 22–46 |
| 69 | June 25 | @ Indians | 2–3 | Wise (5–10) | Garvin (2–7) | Monge (2) | 21,959 | 22–47 |
| 70 | June 26 | Orioles | 24–10 | Underwood (4–7) | Flanagan (11–5) | | 16,184 | 23–47 |
| 71 | June 27 | Orioles | 6–2 | Lemanczyk (2–9) | Palmer (10–6) | Cruz (2) | | 24–47 |
| 72 | June 27 | Orioles | 9–8 | Cruz (1–0) | Stanhouse (1–5) | | 38,563 | 25–47 |
| 73 | June 28 | Orioles | 3–2 | Clancy (5–7) | McGregor (8–6) | Murphy (6) | 28,392 | 26–47 |
| 74 | June 30 | Indians | 0–3 | Wise (6–10) | Garvin (2–8) | | 16,129 | 26–48 |

July: 13–18 (Home 7–7, Away 6–11)

| # | Date | Opponent | Score | Win | Loss | Save | Attendance | Record |
|---|---|---|---|---|---|---|---|---|
| 75 | July 1 | Indians | 9–3 | Underwood (5–7) | Hood (4–4) | Cruz (3) | 19,277 | 27–48 |
| 76 | July 2 | Indians | 0–2 | Waits (6–8) | Lemanczyk (2–10) | Kern (7) | | 27–49 |
| 77 | July 2 | Indians | 3–1 | Jefferson (6–7) | Freisleben (0–2) | | 28,305 | 28–49 |
| 78 | July 3 | @ Tigers | 5–6 | Wilcox (5–7) | Murphy (2–6) | | 21,597 | 28–50 |
| 79 | July 4 | @ Tigers | 9–2 | Moore (4–1) | Morris (1–4) | | 11,913 | 29–50 |
| 80 | July 5 | @ Orioles | 1–3 | Flanagan (12–5) | Garvin (2–9) | | | 29–51 |
| 81 | July 5 | @ Orioles | 6–8 | Kerrigan (1–0) | Murphy (2–7) | | 9,886 | 29–52 |
| 82 | July 6 | @ Orioles | 2–0 | Lemanczyk (3–10) | Palmer (10–7) | Willis (4) | 14,926 | 30–52 |
| 83 | July 7 | @ White Sox | 3–2 | Coleman (4–0) | Hinton (1–2) | Cruz (4) | 18,643 | 31–52 |
| 84 | July 8 | @ White Sox | 3–0 | Clancy (6–7) | Kravec (7–6) | Willis (5) | 23,648 | 32–52 |
| 85 | July 9 | @ White Sox | 3–5 | Stone (7–6) | Underwood (5–8) | Willoughby (11) | 16,493 | 32–53 |
| 86 | July 13 | @ Angels | 0–5 | Aase (7–4) | Lemanczyk (3–11) | | 16,625 | 32–54 |
| 87 | July 14 | @ Angels | 2–3 (11) | Miller (4–0) | Willis (1–4) | | 20,338 | 32–55 |
| 88 | July 15 | @ Athletics | 2–3 | Sosa (6–2) | Underwood (5–9) | | 6,863 | 32–56 |
| 89 | July 16 | @ Athletics | 5–8 | Sosa (7–2) | Willis (1–5) | Heaverlo (7) | 3,753 | 32–57 |
| 90 | July 17 | @ Athletics | 3–5 | Johnson (7–5) | Garvin (2–10) | | 12,414 | 32–58 |
| 91 | July 18 | @ Mariners | 13–12 (10) | Murphy (3–7) | Pole (4–11) | | 6,881 | 33–58 |
| 92 | July 19 | @ Mariners | 2–6 | Honeycutt (3–5) | Jefferson (6–8) | Montague (2) | 7,434 | 33–59 |
| 93 | July 21 | Athletics | 2–7 | Renko (4–4) | Moore (4–2) | | | 33–60 |
| 94 | July 21 | Athletics | 5–4 | Murphy (4–7) | Lacey (6–5) | Cruz (5) | 21,050 | 34–60 |
| 95 | July 22 | Athletics | 7–3 | Clancy (7–7) | Johnson (7–6) | | 21,028 | 35–60 |
| 96 | July 23 | Athletics | 3–5 | Langford (3–7) | Garvin (2–11) | Heaverlo (8) | 23,153 | 35–61 |
| 97 | July 24 | Mariners | 0–1 | Honeycutt (4–5) | Lemanczyk (3–12) | | | 35–62 |
| 98 | July 24 | Mariners | 2–7 | Colborn (2–8) | Jefferson (6–9) | Romo (9) | 16,291 | 35–63 |
| 99 | July 25 | Mariners | 2–4 | Abbott (4–7) | Underwood (5–10) | | 14,103 | 35–64 |
| 100 | July 26 | @ Twins | 5–1 | Moore (5–2) | Goltz (9–7) | | 6,014 | 36–64 |
| 101 | July 27 | @ Twins | 3–6 | Perzanowski (1–0) | Clancy (7–8) | | 18,285 | 36–65 |
| 102 | July 28 | Brewers | 3–2 (11) | Cruz (2–0) | Castro (3–2) | | 17,060 | 37–65 |
| 103 | July 29 | Brewers | 4–3 | Lemanczyk (4–12) | Sorensen (12–8) | Cruz (6) | 25,037 | 38–65 |
| 104 | July 30 | Brewers | 5–10 | Stein (3–2) | Murphy (4–8) | | 21,511 | 38–66 |
| 105 | July 31 | Tigers | 8–7 (14) | Coleman (5–0) | Sykes (5–5) | | 18,032 | 39–66 |

August: 16–14 (Home 10–3, Away 6–11)

| # | Date | Opponent | Score | Win | Loss | Save | Attendance | Record |
|---|---|---|---|---|---|---|---|---|
| 106 | August 1 | Tigers | 2–3 | Slaton (11–8) | Clancy (7–9) | | 19,265 | 39–67 |
| 107 | August 4 | @ Royals | 5–4 | Cruz (3–0) | Hrabosky (4–5) | | 35,064 | 40–67 |
| 108 | August 5 | @ Royals | 3–4 | Gura (9–2) | Lemanczyk (4–13) | Mingori (6) | 34,179 | 40–68 |
| 109 | August 6 | @ Royals | 5–12 | Gale (13–3) | Moore (5–3) | | 35,404 | 40–69 |
| 110 | August 7 | Orioles | 2–1 | Clancy (8–9) | Martínez (8–9) | | 19,184 | 41–69 |
| 111 | August 8 | Orioles | 5–3 | Underwood (6–10) | Flanagan (14–10) | Cruz (7) | 19,052 | 42–69 |
| 112 | August 9 | White Sox | 8–0 | Jefferson (7–9) | Stone (9–8) | | 24,282 | 43–69 |
| 113 | August 10 | White Sox | 7–3 | Garvin (3–11) | Wood (10–10) | Cruz (8) | 15,508 | 44–69 |
| 114 | August 11 | Royals | 8–9 (10) | Hrabosky (5–5) | Cruz (3–1) | | 20,602 | 44–70 |
| 115 | August 12 | Royals | 5–2 | Clancy (9–9) | Splittorff (13–10) | | 23,132 | 45–70 |
| 116 | August 13 | Royals | 3–2 (10) | Willis (2–5) | Hrabosky (5–6) | | 30,270 | 46–70 |
| 117 | August 15 | @ Brewers | 1–9 | Augustine (11–11) | Lemanczyk (4–14) | | | 46–71 |
| – | August 15 | @ Brewers | Postponed (rain) Rescheduled for August 16 | | | | | |
| 118 | August 16 | @ Brewers | 1–8 | Caldwell (15–7) | Jefferson (7–10) | | | 46–72 |
| 119 | August 16 | @ Brewers | 2–3 | Rodríguez (4–5) | Moore (5–4) | McClure (8) | 16,920 | 46–73 |
| 120 | August 17 | @ Brewers | 0–6 | Travers (8–7) | Clancy (9–10) | | 18,829 | 46–74 |
| 121 | August 18 | @ Twins | 3–4 (10) | Holly (1–1) | Murphy (4–9) | | 4,599 | 46–75 |
| 122 | August 19 | @ Twins | 0–5 | Serum (7–5) | Garvin (3–12) | | 10,745 | 46–76 |
| 123 | August 20 | @ Twins | 6–2 | Kirkwood (2–1) | Perzanowski (2–5) | Murphy (7) | 11,685 | 47–76 |
| 124 | August 21 | Rangers | 8–6 | Murphy (5–9) | Umbarger (4–8) | | 16,001 | 48–76 |
| 125 | August 22 | Rangers | 3–1 | Clancy (10–10) | Medich (7–7) | Cruz (9) | 17,492 | 49–76 |
| 126 | August 23 | @ Tigers | 4–3 (12) | Cruz (4–1) | Rozema (6–8) | | | 50–76 |
| 127 | August 23 | @ Tigers | 5–4 | Garvin (4–12) | Sykes (6–6) | Willis (6) | 26,631 | 51–76 |
| 128 | August 24 | @ Tigers | 2–5 | Wilcox (11–8) | Moore (5–5) | | 13,314 | 51–77 |
| 129 | August 25 | Twins | 7–3 | Kirkwood (3–1) | Serum (7–6) | Willis (7) | 15,206 | 52–77 |
| 130 | August 26 | Twins | 4–3 (10) | Cruz (5–1) | Zahn (9–13) | | 25,601 | 53–77 |
| 131 | August 27 | Twins | 2–3 (11) | Marshall (7–11) | Willis (2–6) | | 22,023 | 53–78 |
| 132 | August 28 | @ Rangers | 3–11 | Comer (7–3) | Underwood (6–11) | Barker (4) | 7,400 | 53–79 |
| 133 | August 29 | @ Rangers | 4–1 | Moore (6–5) | Matlack (12–11) | | 9,483 | 54–79 |
| 134 | August 30 | @ Red Sox | 1–2 | Eckersley (16–5) | Kirkwood (3–2) | | | 54–80 |
| 135 | August 30 | @ Red Sox | 7–6 | Cruz (6–1) | Stanley (12–2) | | 32,825 | 55–80 |

September: 4–21 (Home 3–12, Away 1–9)

| # | Date | Opponent | Score | Win | Loss | Save | Attendance | Record |
|---|---|---|---|---|---|---|---|---|
| 136 | September 1 | Angels | 4–6 | Hartzell (6–8) | Jefferson (7–11) | LaRoche (19) | 16,757 | 55–81 |
| 137 | September 2 | Angels | 0–2 | Tanana (17–9) | Clancy (10–11) | | 21,099 | 55–82 |
| 138 | September 3 | Angels | 1–3 | Knapp (14–7) | Underwood (6–12) | | 20,054 | 55–83 |
| 139 | September 4 | Indians | 4–5 | Paxton (10–8) | Moore (6–6) | | 14,364 | 55–84 |
| 140 | September 5 | Indians | 2–6 | Waits (11–13) | Kirkwood (3–3) | | 11,060 | 55–85 |
| 141 | September 6 | Brewers | 0–7 | Sorensen (16–10) | Jefferson (7–12) | | 21,390 | 55–86 |
| 142 | September 7 | Brewers | 5–4 | Cruz (7–1) | McClure (2–5) | | 12,092 | 56–86 |
| 143 | September 8 | Orioles | 4–5 | Briles (4–4) | Underwood (6–13) | Stanhouse (22) | 14,155 | 56–87 |
| 144 | September 9 | Orioles | 0–4 | McGregor (14–12) | Moore (6–7) | | 29,255 | 56–88 |
| 145 | September 11 | @ Indians | 4–6 | Waits (12–13) | Jefferson (7–13) | | | 56–89 |
| 146 | September 11 | @ Indians | 7–1 | Kirkwood (4–3) | Wise (9–19) | | 3,356 | 57–89 |
| – | September 12 | @ Indians | Postponed (rain) Not rescheduled | | | | | |
| 147 | September 15 | @ Orioles | 3–8 | Palmer (19–12) | Cruz (7–2) | | 4,000 | 57–90 |
| 148 | September 16 | @ Orioles | 1–11 | Martínez (14–11) | Jefferson (7–14) | | 10,263 | 57–91 |
| 149 | September 17 | @ Orioles | 0–5 | Flanagan (18–13) | Kirkwood (4–4) | | 4,436 | 57–92 |
| 150 | September 20 | Yankees | 8–1 | Willis (3–6) | Guidry (22–3) | | | 58–92 |
| 151 | September 20 | Yankees | 2–3 | Gossage (10–10) | Cruz (7–3) | | 38,080 | 58–93 |
| 152 | September 21 | Yankees | 1–7 | Hunter (11–5) | Moore (6–8) | Gossage (24) | 28,653 | 58–94 |
| 153 | September 22 | Red Sox | 5–4 | Murphy (6–9) | Hassler (3–5) | | 22,172 | 59–94 |
| 154 | September 23 | Red Sox | 1–3 | Tiant (11–8) | Jefferson (7–15) | | 30,059 | 59–95 |
| 155 | September 24 | Red Sox | 6–7 (14) | Drago (4–4) | Buskey (0–1) | | 33,618 | 59–96 |
| 156 | September 26 | @ Yankees | 1–4 | Figueroa (19–9) | Underwood (6–14) | Gossage (25) | 20,535 | 59–97 |
| 157 | September 27 | @ Yankees | 1–5 | Hunter (12–5) | Willis (3–7) | | 20,052 | 59–98 |
| 158 | September 28 | @ Yankees | 1–3 | Guidry (24–3) | Moore (6–9) | | 30,480 | 59–99 |
| 159 | September 29 | @ Red Sox | 0–11 | Stanley (15–2) | Clancy (10–12) | | 29,626 | 59–100 |
| 160 | September 30 | @ Red Sox | 1–5 | Eckersley (20–8) | Jefferson (7–16) | | 32,659 | 59–101 |

October: 0–1 (Home 0–0, Away 0–1)

| # | Date | Opponent | Score | Win | Loss | Save | Attendance | Record |
|---|---|---|---|---|---|---|---|---|
| 161 | October 1 | @ Red Sox | 0–5 | Tiant (13–8) | Kirkwood (4–5) | | 29,201 | 59–102 |

== Player stats ==
| = Indicates team leader |

=== Batting ===
==== Starters by position ====
Note: Pos = Position; G = Games played; AB = At bats; R = Runs scored; H = Hits; 2B = Doubles; 3B = Triples; Avg = Batting average; HR = Home runs; RBI = Runs batted in; SB = Stolen bases

| Pos | Player | G | AB | R | H | 2B | 3B | Avg. | HR | RBI | SB |
|---|---|---|---|---|---|---|---|---|---|---|---|
| C | Rick Cerone | 88 | 282 | 25 | 63 | 8 | 2 | .223 | 3 | 20 | 0 |
| 1B | John Mayberry | 152 | 515 | 51 | 129 | 15 | 2 | .250 | 22 | 70 | 1 |
| 2B | Dave McKay | 145 | 504 | 59 | 120 | 20 | 8 | .238 | 7 | 45 | 4 |
| 3B | Roy Howell | 140 | 551 | 67 | 149 | 28 | 3 | .270 | 8 | 61 | 0 |
| SS | Luis Gómez | 153 | 413 | 39 | 92 | 7 | 3 | .223 | 0 | 32 | 2 |
| LF | Al Woods | 62 | 220 | 19 | 53 | 12 | 3 | .241 | 3 | 25 | 1 |
| CF | Rick Bosetti | 136 | 568 | 61 | 147 | 25 | 5 | .259 | 5 | 42 | 6 |
| RF | Bob Bailor | 154 | 621 | 74 | 164 | 29 | 7 | .264 | 1 | 52 | 5 |
| DH | Rico Carty | 104 | 387 | 51 | 110 | 16 | 0 | .284 | 20 | 68 | 1 |

==== Other batters ====
Note: G = Games played; AB = At bats; R = Runs scored; H = Hits; 2B = Doubles; 3B = Triples; Avg. = Batting average; HR = Home runs; RBI = Runs batted in; SB = Stolen bases

| Player | G | AB | R | H | 2B | 3B | Avg | HR | RBI | SB |
|---|---|---|---|---|---|---|---|---|---|---|
| Alan Ashby | 81 | 264 | 27 | 69 | 15 | 0 | .261 | 9 | 29 | 1 |
| Otto Vélez | 91 | 248 | 29 | 66 | 14 | 2 | .266 | 9 | 38 | 1 |
| Willie Upshaw | 95 | 224 | 26 | 53 | 8 | 2 | .237 | 1 | 17 | 4 |
| Tommy Hutton | 64 | 173 | 19 | 44 | 9 | 0 | .254 | 2 | 9 | 1 |
| Willie Horton | 33 | 122 | 12 | 25 | 6 | 0 | .205 | 3 | 19 | 0 |
| Doug Ault | 54 | 104 | 10 | 25 | 1 | 1 | .240 | 3 | 7 | 0 |
| Tim Johnson | 68 | 79 | 9 | 19 | 2 | 0 | .241 | 0 | 3 | 0 |
| Sam Ewing | 40 | 56 | 3 | 10 | 0 | 0 | .179 | 2 | 9 | 0 |
| Garth Iorg | 19 | 49 | 3 | 8 | 0 | 0 | .163 | 0 | 3 | 0 |
| Gary Woods | 8 | 19 | 1 | 3 | 1 | 0 | .158 | 0 | 0 | 1 |
| Butch Alberts | 6 | 18 | 1 | 5 | 1 | 0 | .278 | 0 | 0 | 0 |
| Brian Milner | 2 | 9 | 3 | 4 | 0 | 1 | .444 | 0 | 2 | 0 |
| Ernie Whitt | 2 | 4 | 0 | 0 | 0 | 0 | .000 | 0 | 0 | 0 |
| Tim Nordbrook | 7 | 0 | 1 | 0 | 0 | 0 | ---- | 0 | 0 | 0 |

=== Pitching ===
==== Starting pitchers ====
Note: G = Games pitched; GS = Games started; IP = Innings pitched; W = Wins; L = Losses; ERA = Earned run average; R = Runs allowed; ER = Earned runs allowed; BB = Walks allowed; K = Strikeouts

| Player | G | GS | IP | W | L | ERA | R | ER | BB | K |
|---|---|---|---|---|---|---|---|---|---|---|
| Jesse Jefferson | 31 | 30 | 211.2 | 7 | 16 | 4.38 | 109 | 103 | 86 | 97 |
| Tom Underwood | 31 | 30 | 197.2 | 6 | 14 | 4.10 | 105 | 90 | 87 | 139 |
| Jim Clancy | 31 | 30 | 193.2 | 10 | 12 | 4.09 | 96 | 88 | 91 | 106 |
| Jerry Garvin | 26 | 22 | 144.2 | 4 | 12 | 5.54 | 92 | 89 | 48 | 67 |
| Dave Lemanczyk | 29 | 20 | 136.2 | 4 | 14 | 6.26 | 97 | 95 | 67 | 62 |

==== Other pitchers ====
Note: G = Games pitched; GS = Games started; IP = Innings pitched; W = Wins; L = Losses; ERA = Earned run average; R = Runs allowed; ER = Earned runs allowed; BB = Walks allowed; K = Strikeouts

| Player | G | GS | IP | W | L | ERA | R | ER | BB | K |
|---|---|---|---|---|---|---|---|---|---|---|
| Balor Moore | 37 | 18 | 144.1 | 6 | 9 | 4.93 | 85 | 79 | 54 | 75 |
| Don Kirkwood | 16 | 9 | 68.0 | 4 | 5 | 4.24 | 36 | 32 | 25 | 29 |

==== Relief pitchers ====
Note: G = Games pitched; IP = Innings pitched; W = Wins; L = Losses; SV = Saves; ERA = Earned run average; R = Runs allowed; ER = Earned runs allowed; BB = Walks allowed; K = Strikeouts

| Player | G | IP | W | L | SV | ERA | R | ER | BB | K |
|---|---|---|---|---|---|---|---|---|---|---|
| Víctor Cruz | 32 | 47.1 | 7 | 3 | 9 | 1.71 | 10 | 9 | 35 | 51 |
| Mike Willis | 44 | 100.2 | 3 | 7 | 7 | 4.56 | 55 | 51 | 39 | 52 |
| Tom Murphy | 50 | 94.0 | 6 | 9 | 7 | 3.93 | 43 | 41 | 37 | 36 |
| Joe Coleman | 31 | 60.2 | 2 | 0 | 0 | 4.60 | 34 | 31 | 30 | 28 |
| Dave Wallace | 6 | 14.0 | 0 | 0 | 0 | 3.86 | 6 | 6 | 11 | 7 |
| Tom Buskey | 8 | 13.1 | 0 | 1 | 0 | 3.38 | 5 | 5 | 5 | 7 |
| Mark Wiley | 2 | 2.2 | 0 | 0 | 0 | 6.75 | 2 | 2 | 1 | 2 |

== Awards and honours ==
All-Star Game

- Roy Howell, reserve

== Farm system ==
| Level | Team | League | Manager |
|---|---|---|---|
| AAA | Syracuse Chiefs | International League | Vern Benson |
| A | Dunedin Blue Jays | Florida State League | Denis Menke |
| A-Short Season | Utica Blue Jays | New York–Penn League | Duane Larson |
| Rookie | Medicine Hat Blue Jays | Pioneer League | John McLaren |
