= 1978 Baltimore Orioles season =

Major League Baseball season

1978 Baltimore Orioles
- League: American League
- Division: East
- Ballpark: Memorial Stadium
- City: Baltimore, Maryland
- Record: 90–71 (.559)
- Divisional place: 4th
- Owners: Jerold Hoffberger
- General managers: Hank Peters
- Managers: Earl Weaver
- Television: WJZ-TV (Chuck Thompson, Bill O'Donnell, Brooks Robinson)
- Radio: WBAL (AM) (Chuck Thompson, Bill O'Donnell)

The 1978 Baltimore Orioles season was the 78th season in Baltimore Orioles franchise history, the 25th in Baltimore, and the 25th at Memorial Stadium. The Orioles finished fourth in the American League East with a record of 90 wins and 71 losses.

== Offseason ==
- November 23, 1977: Elrod Hendricks was signed as a free agent by the Orioles.
- December 7, 1977: Bryn Smith, Rudy May, and Randy Miller were traded by the Orioles to the Montreal Expos for Don Stanhouse, Joe Kerrigan, and Gary Roenicke.
- January 6, 1978: Ken Rudolph was released by the Orioles.
- February 21, 1978: Tony Muser was released by the Orioles.

== Regular season ==
=== Season standings ===
AL East
Team	W	L	Pct.	GB	Home	Road
New York Yankees	100	63	.613	—	55‍–‍26	45‍–‍37
Boston Red Sox	99	64	.607	1	59‍–‍23	40‍–‍41
Milwaukee Brewers	93	69	.574	6½	54‍–‍27	39‍–‍42
Baltimore Orioles	90	71	.559	9	51‍–‍30	39‍–‍41
Detroit Tigers	86	76	.531	13½	47‍–‍34	39‍–‍42
Cleveland Indians	69	90	.434	29	42‍–‍36	27‍–‍54
Toronto Blue Jays	59	102	.366	40	37‍–‍44	22‍–‍58

=== Record vs. opponents ===
1978 American League record Sources:
Team	BAL	BOS	CAL	CWS	CLE	DET	KC	MIL	MIN	NYY	OAK	SEA	TEX	TOR
Baltimore	—	7–8	4–6	8–1	9–6	7–8	2–8	7–8	5–5	6–9	11–0	9–1	7–4	8–7
Boston	8–7	—	9–2	7–3	7–8	12–3	4–6	10–5	9–2	7–9	5–5	7–3	3–7	11–4
California	6–4	2–9	—	8–7	6–4	4–7	9–6	5–5	12–3	5–5	9–6	9–6	5–10	7–3
Chicago	1–8	3–7	7–8	—	8–2	2–9	8–7	4–7	8–7	1–9	7–8	7–8	11–4	4–6
Cleveland	6–9	8–7	4–6	2–8	—	5–10	5–6	5–10	5–5	6–9	4–6	8–1	1–9	10–4
Detroit	8–7	3–12	7–4	9–2	10–5	—	4–6	7–8	4–6	4–11	6–4	8–2	7–3	9–6
Kansas City	8–2	6–4	6–9	7–8	6–5	6–4	—	6–4	7–8	6–5	10–5	12–3	7–8	5–5
Milwaukee	8–7	5–10	5–5	7–4	10–5	8–7	4–6	—	4–7	10–5	9–1	5–5	6–4	12–3
Minnesota	5–5	2–9	3–12	7–8	5–5	6–4	8–7	7–4	—	3–7	9–6	6–9	6–9	6–4
New York	9–6	9–7	5–5	9–1	9–6	11–4	5–6	5–10	7–3	—	8–2	6–5	6–4	11–4
Oakland	0–11	5–5	6–9	8–7	6–4	4–6	5–10	1–9	6–9	2–8	—	13–2	6–9	7–4
Seattle	1–9	3–7	6–9	8–7	1–8	2–8	3–12	5–5	9–6	5–6	2–13	—	3–12	8–2
Texas	4–7	7–3	10–5	4–11	9–1	3–7	8–7	4–6	9–6	4–6	9–6	12–3	—	4–7
Toronto	7–8	4–11	3–7	6–4	4–10	6–9	5–5	3–12	4–6	4–11	4–7	2–8	7–4	—

=== Opening Day starters ===
- Mark Belanger
- Al Bumbry
- Doug DeCinces
- Rick Dempsey
- Larry Harlow
- Dennis Martínez
- Lee May
- Eddie Murray
- Ken Singleton
- Billy Smith

=== Notable transactions ===
- June 6, 1978: 1978 Major League Baseball draft
  - Cal Ripken Jr. was drafted by the Orioles in the 2nd round, (46th overall). Player signed June 13, 1978.
  - Bobby Bonner was drafted by the Orioles in the 3rd round.
  - Mike Boddicker was drafted by the Orioles in the 6th round.

=== Roster ===
1978 Baltimore Orioles
**Roster**
**Pitchers**: 55 Nelson Briles; 46 Mike Flanagan; 37 John Flinn; 59 Dave Ford; 32 Joe Kerrigan; 30 Dennis Martínez; 23 Tippy Martinez; 16 Scott McGregor; 22 Jim Palmer; 48,26 Don Stanhouse; 52 Earl Stephenson; 53 Sammy Stewart; 49 Tim Stoddard	**Catchers**: 24 Rick Dempsey; 44 Elrod Hendricks; 8 Dave Skaggs; **Infielders**: 7 Mark Belanger; 25 Rich Dauer; 11 Doug DeCinces; 3 Kiko Garcia; 14 Lee May; 33 Eddie Murray; 2 Billy Smith	**Outfielders**: 39 Mike Anderson; 1 Al Bumbry; 10 Terry Crowley; 36 Mike Dimmel; 6 Larry Harlow; 18 Pat Kelly; 9 Carlos López; 27 Andrés Mora; 35 Gary Roenicke; 29 Ken Singleton	**Manager**: 4 Earl Weaver; **Coaches**: 41 Jim Frey (First base); 44 Elrod Hendricks (Bullpen); 31 Ray Miller (Pitching); 47 Cal Ripken (Third base); 20 Frank Robinson (Hitting)

=== Game log ===
Legend
Orioles Win (#bfb)	Orioles Loss (#fbb)	Game postponed (#bbb)
Bold denotes an Orioles pitcher

1978 Baltimore Orioles Season Game Log: 90–71 (Home: 51–30; Away: 39–41)
April: 8–11 (Home: 4–5; Away: 4–6)

#	Date	Opponent	Score	Win	Loss	Save	Attendance	Record	Streak
–	April 6	@ Brewers	Postponed (rain); Makeup: April 7						
1	April 7	@ Brewers	3–11	Augustine (1–0)	**Flanagan** (0–1)		47,824	0–1	L1
2	April 8	@ Brewers	3–16	Haas (1–0)	**D. Martinez** (0–1)		6,470	0–2	L2
3	April 9	@ Brewers	5–13	Sorensen (1–0)	**McGregor** (0–1)		18,514	0–3	L3
4	April 10	@ Royals	2–4	Splittorff (1–0)	**Briles** (0–1)	Hrabosky (1)	38,194	0–4	L4
5	April 12	@ Royals	2–5	Leonard (1–1)	**Flanagan** (0–2)	Mingori (2)	17,449	0–5	L5
6	April 14	Brewers	6–5	**D. Martinez** (1–1)	Sorensen (1–1)	**Stanhouse** (1)	36,086	1–5	W1
7	April 15	Brewers	7–0	**Palmer** (1–0)	Augustine (2–1)		7,527	2–5	W2
8	April 16	Brewers	7–5	**Briles** (1–1)	Haas (2–1)	**Stanhouse** (2)	–	3–5	W3
9	April 16	Brewers	2–9	Replogle (1–0)	**McGregor** (0–2)	Rodríguez (1)	14,995	3–6	L1
10	April 17	@ Yankees	6–1	**Flanagan** (1–2)	Hunter (0–2)		15,674	4–6	W1
11	April 18	@ Yankees	3–4	Lyle (1–0)	**T. Martinez** (0–1)		15,628	4–7	L1
12	April 21	Royals	2–1	**Palmer** (2–0)	Leonard (2–2)	**Stanhouse** (3)	6,203	5–7	W1
13	April 22	Royals	3–5	Splittorff (4–0)	**Flanagan** (1–3)	Hrabosky (4)	7,277	5–8	L1
14	April 23	Royals	5–6	Gura (2–0)	**Stoddard** (0–1)	Pattin (1)	13,833	5–9	L2
15	April 24	Yankees	2–8	Guidry (2–0)	**McGregor** (0–3)		18,053	5–10	L3
16	April 25	Yankees	3–4	Beattie (1–0)	**Palmer** (2–1)	Lyle (2)	14,159	5–11	L4
17	April 28	@ White Sox	6–4	**D. Martinez** (2–1)	Torrealba (1–2)	**Stanhouse** (4)	25,395	6–11	W1
18	April 29	@ White Sox	5–2	**Palmer** (3–1)	Kravec (1–3)	**Stanhouse** (5)	22,240	7–11	W2
19	April 30	@ White Sox	8–7	**McGregor** (1–3)	Torrealba (1–3)		17,786	8–11	W3

May: 15–14 (Home: 8–7; Away: 7–7)

#	Date	Opponent	Score	Win	Loss	Save	Attendance	Record	Streak
20	May 1	@ Red Sox	6–9	Torrez (3–1)	**Briles** (1–2)	Stanley (1)	18,710	8–12	L1
21	May 2	@ Red Sox	3–1	**D. Martinez** (3–1)	Ripley (0–2)		19,930	9–12	W1
22	May 3	Rangers	1–2	Alexander (2–1)	**Stanhouse** (0–1)		6,118	9–13	L1
–	May 4	Rangers	Postponed (rain); Makeup: July 15						
23	May 5	Twins	2–1	**Flanagan** (2–3)	Zahn (2–1)		3,897	10–13	W1
24	May 6	Twins	7–8	Thayer (1–1)	**Stanhouse** (0–2)	T. Johnson (2)	26,870	10–14	L1
25	May 7	Twins	9–15	Scarce (1–1)	**Palmer** (3–2)		8,923	10–15	L2
–	May 8	White Sox	Postponed (rain); Makeup: September 1						
–	May 8	White Sox	Postponed (rain); Makeup: September 2						
26	May 10	Red Sox	3–2	**Flanagan** (3–3)	Burgmeier (1–1)		10,023	11–15	W1
27	May 11	Red Sox	4–5	Lee (5–0)	**D. Martinez** (3–2)	Drago (3)	14,950	11–16	L1
28	May 12	@ Rangers	3–9	Matlack (3–4)	**Palmer** (3–3)		30,803	11–17	L2
29	May 13	@ Rangers	5–1	**McGregor** (2–3)	Umbarger (1–2)		32,700	12–17	W1
30	May 14	@ Rangers	3–2	**Flinn** (1–0)	D. Ellis (2–2)	**Stanhouse** (6)	16,440	13–17	W2
31	May 15	@ Twins	6–9 (10)	Marshall (1–0)	**Flinn** (1–1)		3,847	13–18	L1
32	May 16	@ Twins	1–8	Goltz (1–3)	**Palmer** (3–4)	T. Johnson (3)	4,893	13–19	L2
–	May 17	Blue Jays	Postponed (rain); Makeup: July 5						
33	May 18	Blue Jays	5–3	**Flanagan** (4–3)	Clancy (2–3)		4,255	14–19	W1
34	May 19	@ Indians	5–7	Kern (4–1)	**Stanhouse** (0–3)		15,565	14–20	L1
35	May 20	@ Indians	2–1	**Palmer** (4–4)	Wise (2–7)	**Stanhouse** (7)	11,426	15–20	W1
36	May 21	@ Indians	3–0	**McGregor** (3–3)	Waits (3–3)		–	16–20	W2
37	May 21	@ Indians	2–3	Clyde (2–0)	**Briles** (1–3)	Kinney (5)	23,206	16–21	L1
38	May 23	Tigers	2–0	**Flanagan** (5–3)	Billingham (4–2)		4,536	17–21	W1
39	May 24	Tigers	2–3	Hiller (4–1)	**D. Martinez** (3–3)		–	17–22	L1
40	May 24	Tigers	1–0	**Palmer** (5–4)	Sykes (3–1)		8,196	18–22	W1
41	May 25	Tigers	2–1	**McGregor** (4–3)	Hiller (4–2)		5,109	19–22	W2
42	May 26	Indians	4–3	**T. Martinez** (1–1)	Wise (2–8)		29,215	20–22	W3
43	May 27	Indians	2–6	Clyde (3–0)	**Flanagan** (5–4)		8,920	20–23	L1
44	May 28	Indians	3–4 (10)	Monge (2–0)	**Stanhouse** (0–4)		–	20–24	L2
45	May 28	Indians	3–0	**Palmer** (6–4)	Paxton (1–3)		18,276	21–24	W1
46	May 29	@ Tigers	6–3	**McGregor** (5–3)	Sykes (3–2)		20,534	22–24	W2
47	May 30	@ Tigers	2–5	Baker (1–0)	**Briles** (1–4)	Hiller (5)	10,530	22–25	L1
48	May 31	@ Yankees	3–2	**Flanagan** (6–4)	Figueroa (5–3)		21,404	23–25	W1

June: 18–10 (Home: 7–2; Away: 11–8)

#	Date	Opponent	Score	Win	Loss	Save	Attendance	Record	Streak
49	June 1	@ Yankees	1–0	**Palmer** (7–4)	Beattie (2–1)		19,943	24–25	W2
50	June 2	@ Mariners	10–9	**D. Martinez** (4–3)	Colborn (1–3)	**Stanhouse** (8)	4,936	25–25	W3
51	June 3	@ Mariners	2–1	**McGregor** (6–3)	Mitchell (2–5)	**T. Martinez** (1)	15,002	26–25	W4
52	June 4	@ Mariners	4–1	**Flanagan** (7–4)	Pole (4–6)		6,429	27–25	W5
53	June 5	@ Angels	6–2 (10)	**Stanhouse** (1–4)	LaRoche (3–2)		13,231	28–25	W6
54	June 6	@ Angels	8–6	**D. Martinez** (5–3)	Ryan (3–6)	**Stanhouse** (9)	15,864	29–25	W7
55	June 9	@ Athletics	5–3	**Flanagan** (8–4)	Broberg (6–5)		3,323	30–25	W8
56	June 10	@ Athletics	1–0	**Palmer** (8–4)	Renko (1–2)		11,422	31–25	W9
57	June 11	@ Athletics	3–0	**McGregor** (7–3)	Morgan (0–1)		17,157	32–25	W10
58	June 12	Mariners	5–4	**T. Martinez** (2–1)	Colborn (1–5)	**Stanhouse** (10)	13,212	33–25	W11
59	June 13	Mariners	3–2 (11)	**Flanagan** (9–4)	Romo (3–2)		7,729	34–25	W12
60	June 14	Angels	5–2	**Palmer** (9–4)	Brett (2–4)		21,815	35–25	W13
61	June 15	Angels	1–5	Tanana (10–3)	**McGregor** (7–4)		15,004	35–26	L1
62	June 16	Athletics	6–0	**D. Martinez** (6–3)	Langford (1–4)		31,944	36–26	W1
63	June 17	Athletics	5–4	**Flanagan** (10–4)	Morgan (0–2)	**Stanhouse** (11)	24,619	37–26	W2
64	June 18	Athletics	2–1	**Palmer** (10–4)	Johnson (4–4)	**T. Martinez** (2)	17,143	38–26	W3
65	June 20	@ Brewers	8–5	**McGregor** (8–4)	Travers (3–3)		22,640	39–26	W4
66	June 21	@ Brewers	3–5	Sorensen (9–4)	**D. Martinez** (6–4)	Castro (5)	21,732	39–27	L1
67	June 22	@ Brewers	10–3	**Flanagan** (11–4)	Haas (2–3)		26,586	40–27	W1
68	June 23	@ Red Sox	2–5	Lee (8–3)	**Palmer** (10–5)		34,582	40–28	L1
69	June 24	@ Red Sox	3–8	Tiant (7–0)	**McGregor** (8–5)		32,213	40–29	L2
70	June 25	@ Red Sox	1–4	Torrez (11–3)	**D. Martinez** (6–5)		33,526	40–30	L3
71	June 26	@ Blue Jays	10–24	Underwood (4–7)	**Flanagan** (11–5)		16,184	40–31	L4
72	June 27	@ Blue Jays	2–6	Lemanczyk (2–9)	**Palmer** (10–6)	Cruz (2)	–	40–32	L5
73	June 27	@ Blue Jays	8–9	Cruz (1–0)	**Stanhouse** (1–5)		38,563	40–33	L6
74	June 28	@ Blue Jays	2–3	Clancy (5–7)	**McGregor** (8–6)	Murphy (6)	28,392	40–34	L7
75	June 29	Red Sox	3–4	Ripley (2–4)	**D. Martinez** (6–6)		28,899	40–35	L8
76	June 30	Red Sox	3–2 (11)	**Stanhouse** (2–5)	Tiant (7–1)		33,034	41–35	W1

July: 17–11 (Home: 10–5; Away: 7–6)

#	Date	Opponent	Score	Win	Loss	Save	Attendance	Record	Streak
77	July 1	Red Sox	3–2 (11)	**Briles** (2–4)	Torrez (11–4)		38,542	42–35	W2
–	July 2	Red Sox	Postponed (rain); Makeup: September 6						
78	July 3	@ Indians	0–9	Paxton (6–4)	**McGregor** (8–7)		9,302	42–36	L1
79	July 4	@ Indians	6–4	**D. Martinez** (7–6)	Clyde (4–4)	**Stanhouse** (12)	36,300	43–36	W1
80	July 5	Blue Jays	3–1	**Flanagan** (12–5)	Garvin (2–9)		–	44–36	W2
81	July 5	Blue Jays	8–6	**Kerrigan** (1–0)	Murphy (2–7)		9,886	45–36	W3
82	July 6	Blue Jays	0–2	Lemanczyk (3–10)	**Palmer** (10–7)	Willis (4)	14,926	45–37	L1
83	July 7	@ Royals	1–3	Splittorff (10–7)	**McGregor** (8–8)		23,314	45–38	L2
84	July 8	@ Royals	3–11	Gale (9–3)	**D. Martinez** (7–7)		34,587	45–39	L3
85	July 9	@ Royals	4–10	Leonard (9–11)	**Flanagan** (12–6)		24,662	45–40	L4
ASG	July 11	AL @ NL	3–7	Sutter (1–0)	Gossage (0–1)		51,549	—	N/A
86	July 13	Twins	8–6	**Flanagan** (13–6)	Goltz (8–6)	**T. Martinez** (3)	8,119	46–40	W1
87	July 14	Twins	5–1	**McGregor** (9–8)	Zahn (8–7)		24,195	47–40	W2
88	July 15	Rangers	8–7	**T. Martinez** (3–1)	Barker (1–4)		–	48–40	W3
89	July 15	Rangers	1–11	Medich (4–4)	**Palmer** (10–8)		22,353	48–41	L1
90	July 16	Rangers	2–1 (12)	**Stanhouse** (3–5)	Cleveland (2–5)		11,839	49–41	W1
91	July 17	Rangers	0–2 (11)	Cleveland (3–5)	**Flanagan** (13–7)		11,676	49–42	L1
92	July 18	Rangers	5–1	**McGregor** (10–8)	D. Ellis (8–5)		10,832	50–42	W1
93	July 19	@ White Sox	10–3	**Palmer** (11–8)	Kravec (7–7)		18,682	51–42	W2
94	July 21	@ Twins	5–4 (10)	**Stanhouse** (4–5)	Marshall (4–8)		14,702	52–42	W3
95	July 22	@ Twins	4–5	Goltz (9–6)	**McGregor** (10–9)		10,063	52–43	L1
96	July 23	@ Twins	8–5	**Palmer** (12–8)	Serum (4–4)	**Stanhouse** (13)	30,896	53–43	W1
97	July 24	@ Rangers	10–6	**Stanhouse** (5–5)	Jenkins (9–6)	**McGregor** (1)	11,732	54–43	W2
98	July 25	@ Rangers	7–6	**Kerrigan** (2–0)	Alexander (6–7)	**T. Martinez** (4)	12,686	55–43	W3
99	July 26	@ Tigers	6–9	Billingham (10–5)	**Flanagan** (13–8)	Sykes (1)	18,056	55–44	L1
100	July 27	@ Tigers	7–3	**McGregor** (11–9)	Slaton (10–8)		22,856	56–44	W1
101	July 28	Angels	5–4	**Palmer** (13–8)	Aase (7–6)	**Stanhouse** (14)	14,407	57–44	W2
102	July 29	Angels	1–2	Hartzell (2–6)	**D. Martinez** (7–8)		23,504	57–45	L1
103	July 30	Angels	2–4	Frost (3–4)	**Flanagan** (13–9)	LaRoche (15)	15,350	57–46	L2
104	July 31	Brewers	6–5 (10)	**Kerrigan** (3–0)	Castro (3–3)		10,514	58–46	W1

August: 14–14 (Home: 9–6; Away: 5–8)

#	Date	Opponent	Score	Win	Loss	Save	Attendance	Record	Streak
105	August 2	Brewers	3–5	Caldwell (14–5)	**Palmer** (13–9)	Sorensen (1)	10,663	58–47	L1
106	August 3	Brewers	3–2 (10)	**D. Martinez** (8–8)	Augustine (10–10)		9,654	59–47	W1

September: 17–11 (Home: 13–5; Away: 4–6)

#	Date	Opponent	Score	Win	Loss	Save	Attendance	Record	Streak

October: 1–0 (Home: 0–0; Away: 1–0

#	Date	Opponent	Score	Win	Loss	Save	Attendance	Record	Streak
161	October 1	@ Tigers	4–2	**D. Martinez** (16–11)	Rozema (9–12)		13,948	90–71	W1

== Player stats ==
=== Batting ===
==== Starters by position ====
Note: Pos = Position; G = Games played; AB = At bats; H = Hits; Avg. = Batting average; HR = Home runs; RBI = Runs batted in

Pos	Player	G	AB	H	Avg.	HR	RBI
C	Rick Dempsey	146	441	114	.259	6	32
1B	Eddie Murray	161	610	174	.285	27	95
2B	Rich Dauer	133	459	121	.264	6	46
3B	Doug DeCinces	142	511	146	.286	28	80
SS	Mark Belanger	135	348	74	.213	0	16
LF	Pat Kelly	100	274	75	.274	11	40
CF	Larry Harlow	147	460	112	.243	8	26
RF	Ken Singleton	149	502	147	.293	20	81
DH	Lee May	148	556	137	.246	25	80

==== Other batters ====
Note: G = Games played; AB = At bats; H = Hits; Avg. = Batting average; HR = Home runs; RBI = Runs batted in

Player	G	AB	H	Avg.	HR	RBI
Billy Smith	85	250	65	.260	5	30
Andrés Mora	76	229	49	.214	8	14
Carlos López	120	193	46	.238	4	20
Kiko Garcia	79	186	49	.263	0	13
Al Bumbry	33	114	27	.237	2	6
Terry Crowley	62	95	24	.253	0	12
Dave Skaggs	36	86	13	.151	0	2
Gary Roenicke	27	58	15	.259	3	15
Mike Anderson	53	32	3	.094	0	3
Elrod Hendricks	13	18	6	.333	1	1
Mike Dimmel	8	0	0	----	0	0

=== Pitching ===
==== Starting pitchers ====
Note: G = Games pitched; IP = Innings pitched; W = Wins; L = Losses; ERA = Earned run average; SO = Strikeouts

Player	G	IP	W	L	ERA	SO
Jim Palmer	38	296.0	21	12	2.46	138
Mike Flanagan	40	281.1	19	15	4.03	167
Dennis Martínez	40	276.1	16	11	3.52	142
Scott McGregor	35	233.0	15	13	3.32	94
Sammy Stewart	2	11.1	1	1	3.18	11

==== Other pitchers ====
Note: G = Games pitched; IP = Innings pitched; W = Wins; L = Losses; ERA = Earned run average; SO = Strikeouts

Player	G	IP	W	L	ERA	SO
Nelson Briles	16	54.1	4	4	4.64	30
Dave Ford	2	15.0	1	0	0.00	5

==== Relief pitchers ====
Note: G = Games pitched; W = Wins; L = Losses; SV = Saves; ERA = Earned run average; SO = Strikeouts

Player	G	W	L	SV	ERA	SO
Don Stanhouse	56	6	9	24	2.89	42
Tippy Martinez	42	3	3	5	4.83	57
Joe Kerrigan	26	3	1	3	4.77	41
John Flinn	13	1	1	0	8.04	8
Tim Stoddard	8	0	1	0	6.00	14
Earl Stephenson	2	0	0	0	2.79	4
Larry Harlow	1	0	0	0	67.50	1
Elrod Hendricks	1	0	0	0	0.00	0

== Farm system ==
Level	Team	League	Manager
AAA	Rochester Red Wings	International League	Ken Boyer, Al Widmar and Frank Robinson
AA	Charlotte O's	Southern League	Lance Nichols
A	Miami Orioles	Florida State League	Jimmy Williams
Rookie	Bluefield Orioles	Appalachian League	J. R. Miner

LEAGUE CHAMPIONS: Miami
