= 1978 New York Yankees season =

Season for the Major League Baseball team the New York Yankees

1978 New York Yankees
- World Series champions American League champions American League East champions
- League: American League
- Division: East
- Ballpark: Yankee Stadium
- City: New York City
- Record: 100-63 (.613)
- Owners: George Steinbrenner
- General managers: Cedric Tallis
- Managers: Billy Martin – 52–42 (.553); Dick Howser – 0–1; Bob Lemon – 48–20 (.706)
- Television: WPIX (Phil Rizzuto, Frank Messer, Bill White)
- Radio: WINS (AM) (Frank Messer, Phil Rizzuto, Bill White, Fran Healy)

The 1978 New York Yankees season was the 76th season for the Yankees. The team finished with a record of 100–63, finishing one game ahead of the Boston Red Sox to win their third American League East title. The two teams were tied after 162 games, leading to a one-game playoff, which the Yankees won. New York played home games at Yankee Stadium in The Bronx and was managed by Billy Martin, Dick Howser, and Bob Lemon.

In the best-of-five League Championship Series (ALCS), they defeated the Kansas City Royals in four games. In the World Series, they defeated the Los Angeles Dodgers in six games in a rematch of the previous year's.

The season was tumultuous for the Yankees, as Reggie Jackson was suspended in a mid-season showdown with Billy Martin, which resulted in Martin resigning a week later. For television viewers of the Bronx Bombers, it was the first season to be broadcast nationwide via satellite via WPIX, which that year became a superstation as well partly in response to Ted Turner's WTCG-TV nationwide broadcasts of the Atlanta Braves beginning on Opening Day of 1977. WPIX remained the team's exclusive broadcast partner for the Greater New York television viewers on FTA television and then by now superstation status and satellite broadcasts finally enabled millions all over the country to watch Yankees home and away games live as they happened.

== Offseason ==
- November 22, 1977: Goose Gossage was signed as a free agent by the Yankees.
- December 5, 1977: Jesús Figueroa was drafted from the Yankees by the Chicago Cubs in the 1977 rule 5 draft.
- December 9, 1977: Sergio Ferrer was traded by the Yankees to the New York Mets for Roy Staiger.
- December 12, 1977: Stan Thomas and Ed Ricks (minors) were traded by the Yankees to the Chicago White Sox for Jim Spencer, Tommy Cruz, and Bob Polinsky (minors).

== Regular season ==
Lefthander Ron Guidry was the last Yankee pitcher to win at least 25 games in a season in the 20th century. In 35 starts in the regular season (including the playoff game), he pitched 273 2/3 innings, compiled a 25–3 record with 248 strikeouts, 1.74 ERA, and nine shutouts. Guidry won the Cy Young Award by unanimous vote.

Relief pitcher Goose Gossage won Rolaids Relief Man of the Year Award, leading the American League with 27 saves.

=== Season summary ===
A week after the All-Star Game in July, the team was fourteen games behind Boston, but rallied to tie for first place. With a week to go, New York led by one game and won six straight, but lost the finale at home to struggling Cleveland on Sunday, October 1, while Boston won their final eight games. The Yankees traveled to Fenway Park and defeated the Red Sox 5–4 in the one-game playoff for the AL East title; the Monday afternoon game featured light-hitting shortstop Bucky Dent's famous three-run go-ahead home run in the seventh inning. Jackson's solo home run in the eighth was the winning margin.

For decades, some have mistakenly thought the Yankees trailed by 14½ games, but the maximum deficit was fourteen games, after the July 17 loss and until the July 20 win. New York's biggest lead was 3½ games, after another victory over Boston on Saturday, September 16. The previous weekend, the Yankees swept a four-game series at Fenway, dubbed "The Boston Massacre" by the sports press; it left the teams tied at 86–56 (.606) with three weeks remaining.

==== AL East tie-breaker game ====
October 2, 1978 at Fenway Park, Boston, Massachusetts
Team	1	2	3	4	5	6	7	8	9	R	H	E
New York Yankees	0	0	0	0	0	0	4	1	0	5	8	0
Boston Red Sox	0	1	0	0	1	0	0	2	0	4	11	0
WP: Ron Guidry (25-3) LP: Mike Torrez (16-13) Sv: Goose Gossage (27); Home runs: NYY: Bucky Dent, Reggie Jackson; BOS: Carl Yastrzemski

=== Season standings ===
AL East
Team	W	L	Pct.	GB	Home	Road
New York Yankees	100	63	.613	—	55‍–‍26	45‍–‍37
Boston Red Sox	99	64	.607	1	59‍–‍23	40‍–‍41
Milwaukee Brewers	93	69	.574	6½	54‍–‍27	39‍–‍42
Baltimore Orioles	90	71	.559	9	51‍–‍30	39‍–‍41
Detroit Tigers	86	76	.531	13½	47‍–‍34	39‍–‍42
Cleveland Indians	69	90	.434	29	42‍–‍36	27‍–‍54
Toronto Blue Jays	59	102	.366	40	37‍–‍44	22‍–‍58

=== Record vs. opponents ===
1978 American League record Sources:
Team	BAL	BOS	CAL	CWS	CLE	DET	KC	MIL	MIN	NYY	OAK	SEA	TEX	TOR
Baltimore	—	7–8	4–6	8–1	9–6	7–8	2–8	7–8	5–5	6–9	11–0	9–1	7–4	8–7
Boston	8–7	—	9–2	7–3	7–8	12–3	4–6	10–5	9–2	7–9	5–5	7–3	3–7	11–4
California	6–4	2–9	—	8–7	6–4	4–7	9–6	5–5	12–3	5–5	9–6	9–6	5–10	7–3
Chicago	1–8	3–7	7–8	—	8–2	2–9	8–7	4–7	8–7	1–9	7–8	7–8	11–4	4–6
Cleveland	6–9	8–7	4–6	2–8	—	5–10	5–6	5–10	5–5	6–9	4–6	8–1	1–9	10–4
Detroit	8–7	3–12	7–4	9–2	10–5	—	4–6	7–8	4–6	4–11	6–4	8–2	7–3	9–6
Kansas City	8–2	6–4	6–9	7–8	6–5	6–4	—	6–4	7–8	6–5	10–5	12–3	7–8	5–5
Milwaukee	8–7	5–10	5–5	7–4	10–5	8–7	4–6	—	4–7	10–5	9–1	5–5	6–4	12–3
Minnesota	5–5	2–9	3–12	7–8	5–5	6–4	8–7	7–4	—	3–7	9–6	6–9	6–9	6–4
New York	9–6	9–7	5–5	9–1	9–6	11–4	5–6	5–10	7–3	—	8–2	6–5	6–4	11–4
Oakland	0–11	5–5	6–9	8–7	6–4	4–6	5–10	1–9	6–9	2–8	—	13–2	6–9	7–4
Seattle	1–9	3–7	6–9	8–7	1–8	2–8	3–12	5–5	9–6	5–6	2–13	—	3–12	8–2
Texas	4–7	7–3	10–5	4–11	9–1	3–7	8–7	4–6	9–6	4–6	9–6	12–3	—	4–7
Toronto	7–8	4–11	3–7	6–4	4–10	6–9	5–5	3–12	4–6	4–11	4–7	2–8	7–4	—

=== Notable transactions ===
- June 10: Ken Holtzman was traded by the Yankees to the Chicago Cubs for a player to be named later. Ron Davis was sent to the Yankees on June 12.
- June 14: Rawly Eastwick was traded by the Yankees to the Philadelphia Phillies for Bobby Brown and Jay Johnstone.
- June 15: Mickey Klutts, Dell Alston and $50,000 were traded by the Yankees to the Oakland Athletics for Gary Thomasson.

==== Draft picks ====
- June 6: 1978 Major League Baseball draft
  - Rex Hudler was selected by the Yankees in the first round (18th pick), and he signed on June 20.
  - Steve Balboni was selected by the Yankees in the second round.

=== Roster ===
1978 New York Yankees
Roster
Pitchers: 45 Jim Beattie; 43 Ken Clay; 53 Ron Davis; 36 Rawly Eastwick; 31 Ed Figueroa; 54 Goose Gossage; 49 Ron Guidry; 35 Don Gullett; 53 Ken Holtzman; 29 Catfish Hunter; 40 Bob Kammeyer; 36 Paul Lindblad; 28 Sparky Lyle; 40,53 Larry McCall; 47 Andy Messersmith; 52 Dave Rajsich; 19 Dick Tidrow	Catchers: 40 Fran Healy; 46 Mike Heath; 41 Cliff Johnson; 15 Thurman Munson; Infielders: 10 Chris Chambliss; 20 Bucky Dent; 25 Brian Doyle; 23 Dámaso García; 24 Mickey Klutts; 9 Graig Nettles; 26 Domingo Ramos; 30 Willie Randolph; 18 Dennis Sherrill; 11 Fred Stanley; 25 George Zeber	Outfielders: 2 Paul Blair; 44 Reggie Jackson; 27 Jay Johnstone; 14 Lou Piniella; 17 Mickey Rivers; 12 Jim Spencer; 24 Gary Thomasson; 6 Roy White; Other batters: 27 Dell Alston	Manager: 1 Billy Martin; 34 Dick Howser; 21 Bob Lemon; Coaches: 8 Yogi Berra; 42 Art Fowler (Pitching); 32 Elston Howard (First base); 34 Dick Howser (Third base); 48 Clyde King; 33 Gene Michael

=== Notable events ===
The defending World Series champions got off to a slow start in 1978, prompting owner George Steinbrenner to put pressure on manager Billy Martin. Compounding the issue was the already-tumultuous relationship between Martin and Reggie Jackson, and Steinbrenner was pressuring him as well. On July 17, with the team at 47–42 (.528) and in fourth place in the American League East, it came to a head during a home contest with the Kansas City Royals on Monday, July 17. With the score tied in the bottom of the tenth inning and Thurman Munson on first, Martin sent Jackson to the plate with orders to lay down a sacrifice bunt. Jackson tried to bunt the first pitch, but failed. Martin then relayed to third-base coach Dick Howser for Jackson to swing and Howser passed it on, but Jackson ignored Howser and attempted another bunt. Howser called time and talked with Jackson, but to no avail. On his final bunt attempt, Jackson fouled out to the catcher. Martin then removed Jackson from the game and suspended him (owner Steinbrenner limited it to five days, Tuesday through Saturday), but Kansas City won in eleven innings and swept the three-game series. Tuesday was an open date; the Yankees traveled to Minnesota and Jackson went to California.

Jackson returned to the team in Chicago on Sunday, July 23; he did not take batting practice and remained on the bench as the Yankees swept the White Sox for their fifth consecutive win. Martin commented in a post-game interview at the Chicago airport that (referring to Jackson and Steinbrenner, respectively) 'one's a born liar, and the other's convicted.' The Steinbrenner reference was alluding to a past incident where the Yankee owner made illegal U.S. presidential campaign contributions. The next day in Kansas City, Martin appeared on live television and tearfully announced his resignation as Yankees manager, but most sources believed he was actually fired by Steinbrenner for the "convicted" comment. Howser was acting manager for one game on July 24, a 5–2 loss at Kansas City on ABC's Monday Night Baseball, then Bob Lemon arrived as manager for the rest of the season.

In his first appearance since the bunting incident ten days earlier, Jackson started in right field on Thursday, July 27, and went three-for-three, with a home run, a walk, and three RBI. In the nightcap of the doubleheader, he had two hits.

During the Old-Timer's Day ceremony at Yankee Stadium on Saturday, July 29, Yankee public address announcer Bob Sheppard introduced Martin to the crowd and announced that Martin would return as manager for the 1980 season. Martin returned ahead of schedule, in June 1979, and was fired again four months later, after a fight in a Minnesota hotel. He went west to Oakland in 1980, then owned by Charlie O. Finley. Martin returned to the Yankees and managed the team in 1983, 1985, and 1988.

Under Lemon in 1978, the Yankees were 47–20 (.701) for the rest of the 162-game season to tie for the division title, after having been fourteen games back on July 19. They won the division in a one-game playoff on the road, and went on to repeat as World Series champions.

On September 30, Ed Figueroa won his twentieth game of the season, which clinched a tie for the AL East title. As of 2018, Figueroa is the only native of Puerto Rico to win twenty games in a major league season.

== Game log ==
=== Regular season ===
Legend
	Yankees win
	Yankees loss
	Postponement
	Clinched division
**Bold**	Yankees team member

1978 regular season game log: 100–63 (Home: 55–26; Away: 45–37)
April: 10–9 (Home: 5–3; Away: 5–6)

#	Date	Time (ET)	Opponent	Score	Win	Loss	Save	Time of Game	Attendance	Record	Box/ Streak
1	April 8		@ Rangers	L 1–2	Matlack (1–0)	**Gossage** (0–1)			40,078	0–1	L1
2	April 9		@ Rangers	**W** 7–1	**Figueroa** (1–0)	Alexander (0–1)			20,243	1–1	W1
3	April 10		@ Rangers	L 2–5	D. Ellis (1–0)	**Tidrow** (0–1)	Moret (1)		14,299	1–2	L1
4	April 11	@ Brewers	6–9	Augustine (2–0)	**Hunter** (0–1)	Caldwell (1)	County Stadium	8,934	1–3		
5	April 12	@ Brewers	3–5	Haas (2–0)	**Gossage** (0–2)		County Stadium	8,751	1–4		
6	April 13	White Sox	4–2	**Guidry** (1–0)	Wood (0–2)		**Yankee Stadium**	44,667	2–4		
7	April 15	White Sox	3–2	**Figueroa** (2–0)	Barrios (0–1)		**Yankee Stadium**	20,965	3–4		
8	April 16	White Sox	3–0	**Tidrow** (1–1)	Kravec (1–1)	**Lyle** (1)	**Yankee Stadium**	32,750	4–4		
9	April 17	Orioles	1–6	Flanagan (1–2)	**Hunter** (0–2)		**Yankee Stadium**	15,674	4–5		
10	April 18	Orioles	4–3	**Lyle** (1–0)	T. Martinez (0–1)		**Yankee Stadium**	15,628	5–5		
11	April 19	@ Blue Jays	3–4	Murphy (1–0)	**Gossage** (0–3)		Exhibition Stadium	13,306	5–6		
—	April 20	@ Blue Jays	Postponed (rain); Makeup: September 20								
12	April 21	Brewers	2–9	Augustine (3–1)	**Figueroa** (2–1)		**Yankee Stadium**	15,105	5–7		
13	April 22	Brewers	4–3 (12)	**Lyle** (2–0)	McClure (0–1)		**Yankee Stadium**	17,594	6–7		
14	April 23	Brewers	2–3	Sorensen (2–1)	**Hunter** (0–3)	McClure (0–1)	**Yankee Stadium**	26,291	6–8		
15	April 24	@ Orioles	8–2	**Guidry** (2–0)	McGregor (0–3)		Memorial Stadium	18,053	7–8		
16	April 25	@ Orioles	4–3	**Beattie** (1–0)	Palmer (2–1)	**Lyle** (2)	Memorial Stadium	14,159	8–8		
17	April 28	@ Twins	3–1	**Figueroa** (3–1)	Thormodsgard (1–2)		Metropolitan Stadium	11,674	9–8		
18	April 29	@ Twins	1–3	Zahn (2–0)	**Tidrow** (1–2)		Metropolitan Stadium	10,543	9–9		
19	April 30	@ Twins	3–2	**Gossage** (1–3)	Scarce (0–1)		Metropolitan Stadium	13,929	10–9		

May: 19–8 (Home: 11–3; Away: 8–5)

#	Date	Time (ET)	Opponent	Score	Win	Loss	Save	Time of Game	Attendance	Record	Box/ Streak
20	May 1	8:00 p.m. EDT	Royals	**W** 8–4	**Eastwick** (1–0)	Splittorff (4–2)	**Lyle** (3)	2:37	17,340	11–9	W2
21	May 2	8:00 p.m. EDT	Royals	**W** 4–2	**Hunter** (1–3)	Gura (2–1)	**Lyle** (4)	2:09	19,152	12–9	W3
22	May 3	8:00 p.m. EDT	Royals	**W** 6–5	**Figueroa** (4–1)	Leonard (3–4)	**Gossage** (1)	2:20	21,230	13–9	W4
23	May 5		Rangers	**W** 5–2	**Guidry** (3–0)	Matlack (2–4)	**Gossage** (2)		17,285	14–9	W5
24	May 6		Rangers	L 5–9	Umbarger (1–1)	**Tidrow** (1–3)			19,788	14–10	L1
25	May 7		Rangers	**W** 3–2 (12)	**Gossage** (2–3)	Barker (1–2)			53,829	15–10	W1
—	May 8	Twins	Postponed (rain); Makeup: July 30								
26	May 9	Twins	3–1	**Hunter** (2–3)	Thormodsgard (1–4)	**Lyle** (5)	**Yankee Stadium**	11,271	16–10		
27	May 12	8:30 p.m. EDT	@ Royals	L 3–4	Bird (2–2)	**Gossage** (2–4)	—	2:28	33,061	16–11	L1
28	May 13	8:30 p.m. EDT	@ Royals	**W** 5–2	**Guidry** (4–0)	Leonard (3–6)	**Gossage** (3)	2L27	40,903	17–11	W1
29	May 14	2:30 p.m. EDT	@ Royals	L 9–10	Hrabosky (1–0)	**Clay** (0–1)	—	2:57	36,034	17–12	L2
30	May 15	@ White Sox	4–1	**Beattie** (2–0)	Wortham (1–2)	**Lyle** (6)	Comiskey Park	17,569	18–12		
31	May 16	@ White Sox	8–3	**Holtzman** (1–0)	Wood (3–4)	**Gossage** (4)	Comiskey Park	21,837	19–12		
32	May 17	@ Indians	4–5 (10)	Monge (1–0)	**Lyle** (2–1)		Cleveland Stadium	10,370	19–13		
33	May 18	@ Indians	5–3	**Guidry** (5–0)	Kinney (0–2)	**Gossage** (5)	Cleveland Stadium	13,625	20–13		
34	May 19	@ Blue Jays	11–3	**Tidrow** (2–3)	Jefferson (2–5)		Exhibition Stadium	26,025	21–13		
35	May 20	@ Blue Jays	8–10	Lemanczyk (1–7)	**Clay** (0–2)		Exhibition Stadium	30,550	21–14		
36	May 21	@ Blue Jays	2–1	**Figueroa** (5–1)	Underwood (1–4)	**Gossage** (6)	Exhibition Stadium	–	22–14		
37	May 21	@ Blue Jays	9–1	**Clay** (1–2)	Garvin (2–2)		Exhibition Stadium	41,308	23–14		
38	May 23	Indians	10–1	**Guidry** (6–0)	Hood (3–2)		**Yankee Stadium**	20,618	24–14		
—	May 24	Indians	Postponed (rain); Makeup: July 27								
39	May 25	Indians	9–3	**Tidrow** (3–3)	Waits (3–4)		**Yankee Stadium**	15,403	25–14		
40	May 26	Blue Jays	4–3	**Lyle** (3–1)	Garvin (2–3)		**Yankee Stadium**	24,171	26–14		
41	May 27	Blue Jays	1–4	Clancy (3–4)	**Figueroa** (5–2)	Murphy (3)	**Yankee Stadium**	56,078	26–15		
42	May 28	Blue Jays	5–3	**Guidry** (7–0)	Jefferson (3–6)		**Yankee Stadium**	–	27–15		
43	May 28	Blue Jays	6–5 (13)	**Gossage** (3–4)	Murphy (2–1)		**Yankee Stadium**	41,534	28–15		
44	May 29	@ Indians	2–0	**Eastwick** (2–0)	Waits (3–5)		Cleveland Stadium	19,563	29–15		
45	May 30	@ Indians	1–5	Wise (3–8)	**Tidrow** (3–4)		Cleveland Stadium	6,069	29–16		
46	May 31	Orioles	2–3	Flanagan (6–4)	**Figueroa** (5–3)		**Yankee Stadium**	21,404	29–17		

June: 14–15 (Home: 7–4; Away: 7–11)

#	Date	Time (ET)	Opponent	Score	Win	Loss	Save	Time of Game	Attendance	Record	Box/ Streak
47	June 1	Orioles	0–1	Palmer (7–4)	**Beattie** (2–1)		**Yankee Stadium**	19,943	29–18		
48	June 2	@ Athletics	3–1	**Guidry** (8–0)	Johnson (4–3)	**Gossage** (7)	Oakland Coliseum	18,993	30–18		
49	June 3	@ Athletics	1–5	Keough (3–4)	**Messersmith** (0–1)		Oakland Coliseum	14,499	30–19		
50	June 4	@ Athletics	4–6	Lacey (5–2)	**Eastwick** (2–1)	Sosa (7)	Oakland Coliseum	19,289	30–20		
51	June 5	@ Mariners	3–7	House (4–4)	**Figueroa** (5–4)		Kingdome	15,189	30–21		
52	June 6	@ Mariners	3–4	Rawley (3–5)	**Gossage** (3–5)		Kingdome	12,638	30–22		
53	June 7	@ Mariners	9–1	**Guidry** (9–0)	Colborn (1–4)		Kingdome	12,544	31–22		
54	June 9	@ Angels	3–1	**Figueroa** (6–4)	Tanana (9–3)	**Gossage** (8)	Anaheim Stadium	29,415	32–22		
55	June 10	@ Angels	3–4 (12)	LaRoche (5–2)	**Gossage** (3–6)		Anaheim Stadium	37,848	32–23		
56	June 11	@ Angels	6–9	D. Miller (2–0)	**Clay** (1–3)		Anaheim Stadium	31,646	32–24		
57	June 12	Athletics	2–0	**Guidry** (10–0)	Heaverlo (2–2)		**Yankee Stadium**	28,457	33–24		
58	June 13	Athletics	5–3	**Figueroa** (7–4)	Langford (1–3)	**Gossage** (9)	**Yankee Stadium**	30,779	34–24		
59	June 14	Mariners	11–9 (10)	**Lyle** (4–1)	Montague (0–2)		**Yankee Stadium**	18,015	35–24		
60	June 15	Mariners	5–2	**Gullett** (1–0)	Mitchell (2–7)	**Lyle** (7)	**Yankee Stadium**	18,643	36–24		
61	June 16	Angels	7–10	Aase (3–3)	**Beattie** (2–2)		**Yankee Stadium**	35,968	36–25		
62	June 17	Angels	4–0	**Guidry** (11–0)	Hartzell (1–5)		**Yankee Stadium**	33,162	37–25		
63	June 18	Angels	2–3	Knapp (7–5)	**Figueroa** (7–5)		**Yankee Stadium**	55,604	37–26		
64	June 19	7:30 p.m. EDT	@ Red Sox	L 4–10	Burgmeier (2–1)	**Gossage** (3–7)	—	2:48	33,163	37–27	L2
65	June 20	7:30 p.m. EDT	@ Red Sox	**W** 10–4	**Gullett** (2–0)	Torrez (10–3)	—	3:13	32,643	38–27	W1
66	June 21	7:30 p.m. EDT	@ Red Sox	L 2–9	Eckersley (7–2)	**Beattie** (2–3)	—	2:38	32,459	38–28	L1
67	June 22	@ Tigers	4–2	**Guidry** (12–0)	Rozema (2–4)	**Gossage** (10)	Tiger Stadium	33,971	39–28		
68	June 23	@ Tigers	12–3	**Lyle** (5–1)	Wilcox (4–6)		Tiger Stadium	39,022	40–28		
69	June 24	@ Tigers	3–4	Slaton (7–4)	**Tidrow** (3–5)		Tiger Stadium	37,681	40–29		
70	June 25	@ Tigers	4–2	**Gullett** (3–0)	Baker (1–1)	**Gossage** (11)	Tiger Stadium	34,014	41–29		
71	June 26	8:00 p.m. EDT	Red Sox	L 1–4	Eckersley (8–2)	**Messersmith** (0–2)	Campbell (3)	3:01	52,124	41–30	L1
72	June 27	8:00 p.m. EDT	Red Sox	**W** 6–4 (14)	**Lyle** (6–1)	Drago (2–2)	—	4:08	55,132	42–30	W1
73	June 28	@ Brewers	0–5	Caldwell (8–5)	**Tidrow** (3–6)		County Stadium	–	42–31		
74	June 28	@ Brewers	2–7	Augustine (9–8)	**McCall** (0–1)		County Stadium	39,283	42–32		
75	June 30	Tigers	10–2	**Gullett** (4–0)	Baker (1–2)		**Yankee Stadium**	33,894	43–32		

July: 15–14 (Home: 8–8; Away: 7–6)

#	Date	Time (ET)	Opponent	Score	Win	Loss	Save	Time of Game	Attendance	Record	Box/ Streak
76	July 1	Tigers	4–8	Billingham (6–5)	**Messersmith** (0–3)		**Yankee Stadium**	37,260	43–33		
77	July 2	Tigers	3–2	**Guidry** (13–0)	Hiller (6–4)	**Gossage** (12)	**Yankee Stadium**	–	44–33		
78	July 2	Tigers	5–3	**Gossage** (4–7)	Slaton (8–5)		**Yankee Stadium**	51,327	45–33		
79	July 3	7:30 p.m. EDT	@ Red Sox	L 5–9	Eckersley (9–2)	**Figueroa** (7–6)	—	2:54	34,722	45–34	L1
—	July 4	2:00 p.m. EDT	@ Red Sox	**Postponed (Rain)** (Makeup date: September 7)							
80	July 5		@ Rangers	L 2–3	Matlack (7–8)	**Gullett** (4–1)			37,702	45–35	L2
81	July 6		@ Rangers	**W** 7–2	**Tidrow** (4–6)	Medich (3–4)			37,930	46–35	W1
82	July 7	@ Brewers	0–6	Caldwell (9–5)	**Guidry** (13–1)		County Stadium	40,216	46–36		
83	July 8	@ Brewers	5–6	Rodríguez (1–3)	**Gossage** (4–8)	McClure (4)	County Stadium	46,518	46–37		
84	July 9	@ Brewers	4–8	Travers (5–4)	**Gullett** (4–2)	Stein (1)	County Stadium	42,633	46–38		
**49th All-Star Game in San Diego, California**
85	July 13	White Sox	1–6	Wood (10–5)	**Tidrow** (4–7)		**Yankee Stadium**	28,532	46–39		
86	July 14	White Sox	7–6 (11)	**Gossage** (5–8)	Hinton (1–3)		**Yankee Stadium**	21,981	47–39		
87	July 15	8:00 p.m. EDT	Royals	L 2–8	Leonard (10–11)	**Figueroa** (7–7)	—	2:21	34,979	47–40	L1
88	July 16	2:00 p.m. EDT	Royals	L 1–3	Gura (7–2)	**Beattie** (2–4)	Hrabosky (13)	2:36	45,089	47–41	L2
89	July 17	8:00 p.m. EDT	Royals	L 7–9 (11)	Hrabosky (3–3)	**Gossage** (5–9)	—	3:21	27,020	47–42	L3
90	July 19	@ Twins	2–0	**Figueroa** (8–7)	Zahn (8–8)		Metropolitan Stadium	29,591	48–42		
91	July 20	@ Twins	4–0	**Guidry** (14–1)	Jackson (2–3)		Metropolitan Stadium	30,660	49–42		
92	July 21	@ White Sox	7–4	**Lyle** (7–1)	Hinton (1–4)	**Gossage** (13)	Comiskey Park	30,348	50–42		
93	July 22	@ White Sox	7–2	**Hunter** (3–3)	Wood (10–7)		Comiskey Park	32,163	51–42		
94	July 23	@ White Sox	3–1	**Figueroa** (9–7)	Kravec (7–8)	**Gossage** (14)	Comiskey Park	27,651	52–42		
95	July 24	8:30 p.m. EDT	@ Royals	L 2–5	Leonard (12–11)	**Tidrow** (4–8)	—	2:25	38,859	52–43	L1
96	July 25	8:30 p.m. EDT	@ Royals	**W** 4–0	**Guidry** (15–1)	Splittorff (11–9)	—	2:05	40,183	53–43	W1
97	July 26	Indians	3–1	**Gossage** (6–9)	Waits (7–11)		**Yankee Stadium**	31,631	54–43		
98	July 27	Indians	11–0	**Figueroa** (10–7)	Clyde (5–6)		**Yankee Stadium**	–	55–43		
99	July 27	Indians	5–17	Hood (5–4)	**Hunter** (3–4)		**Yankee Stadium**	33,412	55–44		
100	July 28	Twins	5–7 (10)	Marshall (5–8)	**Lyle** (7–2)		**Yankee Stadium**	25,037	55–45		
101	July 29	Twins	7–3	**Clay** (2–3)	Jackson (3–4)	**Gossage** (15)	**Yankee Stadium**	46,711	56–45		
102	July 30	Twins	4–3	**Gossage** (7–9)	Marshall (5–9)		**Yankee Stadium**	–	57–45		
103	July 30	Twins	0–2	Goltz (10–7)	**Beattie** (2–5)	Marshall (14)	**Yankee Stadium**	41,491	57–46		
104	July 31		Rangers	**W** 6–1	**Figueroa** (11–7)	Medich (5–6)			15,419	58–46	W1

August: 19–8 (Home: 11–3; Away: 8–5)

#	Date	Time (ET)	Opponent	Score	Win	Loss	Save	Time of Game	Attendance	Record	Box/ Streak
105	August 1		Rangers	**W** 8–1	**Hunter** (4–4)	Matlack (8–9)			18,485	59–46	W2
106	August 2	8:00 p.m. EDT	Red Sox	L 5–7 (17)	Stanley (6–1)	**Clay** (2–4)	—	5:00	52,701	59–47	L1
107	August 3	8:00 p.m. EDT	Red Sox	L 1–8 (7)	Torrez (13–6)	**Beattie** (2–6)	—	2:15	53,379	59–48	L2
108	August 4	Orioles	1–2	Flanagan (14–9)	**Guidry** (15–2)	Stanhouse (15)	**Yankee Stadium**	28,189	59–49		
109	August 5	Orioles	3–2	**Lyle** (8–2)	T. Martinez (3–2)		**Yankee Stadium**	26,727	60–49		
110	August 6	Orioles	3–0	**Hunter** (5–4)	Palmer (13–10)		**Yankee Stadium**	40,765	61–49		
111	August 8	Brewers	3–0	**Tidrow** (5–8)	Caldwell (14–6)	**Gossage** (16)	**Yankee Stadium**	22,549	62–49		
112	August 9	Brewers	8–7	**McCall** (1–1)	McClure (2–3)		**Yankee Stadium**	27,172	63–49		
113	August 10	Brewers	9–0	**Guidry** (16–2)	Augustine (10–11)		**Yankee Stadium**	35,127	64–49		
114	August 11	@ Orioles	2–1 (6)	**Hunter** (6–4)	D. Martínez (8–10)		Memorial Stadium	29,539	65–49		
115	August 12	@ Orioles	4–6	Flanagan (15–10)	**Beattie** (2–7)	Stanhouse (17)	Memorial Stadium	32,153	65–50		
116	August 13	@ Orioles	0–3 (6)	McGregor (12–10)	**Figueroa** (11–8)		Memorial Stadium	31,591	65–51		
117	August 14	@ Orioles	4–1	**Gossage** (8–9)	Palmer (14–11)		Memorial Stadium	30,397	66–51		
118	August 15	@ Athletics	6–0	**Guidry** (17–2)	Langford (6–8)		Oakland Coliseum	13,862	67–51		
119	August 16	@ Athletics	5–3	**Hunter** (7–4)	Lacey (8–6)	**Gossage** (17)	Oakland Coliseum	10,394	68–51		
120	August 18	@ Mariners	6–1	**Figueroa** (12–8)	Mitchell (6–12)		Kingdome	19,824	69–51		
121	August 19	@ Mariners	1–4	Colborn (4–8)	**Tidrow** (5–9)		Kingdome	29,915	69–52		
122	August 20	@ Mariners	4–5	Romo (10–4)	**Gossage** (8–10)		Kingdome	21,834	69–53		
123	August 22	@ Angels	6–2	**Hunter** (8–4)	Tanana (16–8)		Anaheim Stadium	35,644	70–53		
124	August 23	@ Angels	3–6	Knapp (13–7)	**Figueroa** (12–9)	LaRoche (18)	Anaheim Stadium	33,472	70–54		
125	August 25	Athletics	7–1	**Guidry** (18–2)	Johnson (10–7)		**Yankee Stadium**	29,010	71–54		
126	August 26	Athletics	5–4	**Lyle** (9–2)	Lacey (8–8)		**Yankee Stadium**	53,883	72–54		
127	August 27	Athletics	6–2	**Hunter** (9–4)	Langford (6–10)	**Gossage** (18)	**Yankee Stadium**	40,628	73–54		
128	August 28	Angels	4–1	**Figueroa** (13–9)	Tanana (16–9)	**Gossage** (19)	**Yankee Stadium**	22,481	74–54		
129	August 29	Angels	4–3 (11)	**Gossage** (9–10)	LaRoche (9–6)		**Yankee Stadium**	24,203	75–54		
130	August 30	@ Orioles	5–4	**Guidry** (19–2)	T. Martinez (3–3)	**Gossage** (20)	Memorial Stadium	20,501	76–54		
131	August 31	@ Orioles	6–2	**Tidrow** (6–9)	McGregor (12–12)	**Lyle** (8)	Memorial Stadium	15,579	77–54		

September: 22–8 (Home: 13–4; Away: 9–4)

#	Date	Time (ET)	Opponent	Score	Win	Loss	Save	Time of Game	Attendance	Record	Box/ Streak
132	September 1	Mariners	0–3	Mitchell (7–13)	**Hunter** (9–5)		**Yankee Stadium**	20,167	77–55		
133	September 2	Mariners	6–2	**Figueroa** (14–9)	Colborn (4–10)		**Yankee Stadium**	18,530	78–55		
134	September 3	Mariners	4–3	**Beattie** (3–7)	Honeycutt (5–8)	**Gossage** (21)	**Yankee Stadium**	22,386	79–55		
135	September 4	Tigers	9–1	**Guidry** (20–2)	Wilcox (12–9)		**Yankee Stadium**	–	80–55		
136	September 4	Tigers	4–5	Hiller (7–4)	**Lyle** (9–3)		**Yankee Stadium**	46,896	80–56		
137	September 5	Tigers	4–2	**Tidrow** (7–9)	Young (5–5)	**Gossage** (22)	**Yankee Stadium**	16,891	81–56		
138	September 6	Tigers	8–2	**Figueroa** (15–9)	Billingham (15–7)		**Yankee Stadium**	24,452	82–56		
139	September 7	7:30 p.m. EDT	@ Red Sox	**W** 15–3	**Clay** (3–4)	Torrez (15–9)	—	3:09	34,119	83–56	W3
140	September 8	7:30 p.m. EDT	@ Red Sox	**W** 13–2	**Beattie** (4–7)	Wright (8–3)	—	2:55	33,134	84–56	W4
141	September 9	2:00 p.m. EDT	@ Red Sox	**W** 7–0	**Guidry** (21–2)	Eckersley (16–7)	—	2:26	33,611	85–56	W5
142	September 10	2:00 p.m. EDT	@ Red Sox	**W** 7–4	**Figueroa** (16–9)	Sprowl (0–2)	**Gossage** (23)	2:57	32,786	86–56	W6
143	September 12	@ Tigers	4–7	Young (6–5)	**Tidrow** (7–10)	Hiller (13)	Tiger Stadium	14,162	86–57		
144	September 13	@ Tigers	7–3	**Beattie** (5–7)	Billingham (15–8)		Tiger Stadium	16,841	87–57		
145	September 14	@ Tigers	4–2	**Figueroa** (17–9)	Slaton (15–11)	**Lyle** (9)	Tiger Stadium	17,118	88–57		
146	September 15	8:00 p.m. EDT	Red Sox	**W** 4–0	**Guidry** (22–2)	Tiant (10–8)	—	2:24	54,901	89–57	W3
147	September 16	2:00 p.m. EDT	Red Sox	**W** 3–2	**Hunter** (10–5)	Torrez (15–11)	—	2:38	55,091	90–57	W4
148	September 17	2:00 p.m. EDT	Red Sox	L 3–7	Eckersley (17–8)	**Beattie** (5–8)	Stanley (9)	2:40	55,088	90–58	L1
149	September 18	Brewers	4–3	**Figueroa** (18–9)	Travers (10–11)		**Yankee Stadium**	20,557	91–58		
150	September 19	Brewers	0–2	Caldwell (20–9)	**Tidrow** (7–11)		**Yankee Stadium**	26,682	91–59		
151	September 20	@ Blue Jays	1–8	Willis (3–6)	**Guidry** (22–3)		Exhibition Stadium	–	91–60		
152	September 20	@ Blue Jays	3–2	**Gossage** (10–10)	Cruz (7–3)		Exhibition Stadium	38,080	92–60		
153	September 21	@ Blue Jays	7–1	**Hunter** (11–5)	Moore (6–8)	**Gossage** (24)	Exhibition Stadium	28,653	93–60		
154	September 22	@ Indians	7–8 (10)	Monge (4–3)	**Gossage** (10–11)		Cleveland Stadium	10,035	93–61		
155	September 23	@ Indians	1–10	Clyde (8–11)	**Beattie** (5–9)		Cleveland Stadium	17,452	93–62		
156	September 24	@ Indians	4–0	**Guidry** (23–3)	Paxton (12–10)		Cleveland Stadium	15,855	94–62		
157	September 26	Blue Jays	4–1	**Figueroa** (19–9)	Underwood (6–14)	**Gossage** (25)	**Yankee Stadium**	20,535	95–62		
158	September 27	Blue Jays	5–1	**Hunter** (12–5)	Willis (3–7)		**Yankee Stadium**	20,052	96–62		
159	September 28	Blue Jays	3–1	**Guidry** (24–3)	Moore (6–9)		**Yankee Stadium**	30,480	97–62		
160	September 29	Indians	3–1	**Beattie** (6–9)	Kern (10–10)	**Gossage** (26)	**Yankee Stadium**	30,253	98–62		
161	September 30	Indians	7–0	**Figueroa** (20–9)	Paxton (12–11)		**Yankee Stadium**	55,219	99–62		

October: 1–1 (Home: 0–1; Away: 1–0)

#	Date	Time (ET)	Opponent	Score	Win	Loss	Save	Time of Game	Attendance	Record	Box/ Streak
162	October 1	Indians	2–9	Waits (13–15)	**Hunter** (12–6)		**Yankee Stadium**	39,189	99–63		
163	October 2	2:00 p.m. EDT	@ Red Sox	**W** 5–4	**Guidry** (25–3)	Torrez (16–13)	**Gossage** (27)	2:52	32,925	100–63	W1

=== Detailed records ===
American League
Opponent	W	L	WP	RS	RA
AL East
Boston Red Sox	9	7	0.563	91	77
**New York Yankees**					
Div Total	9	7	0.563	91	77
AL West
Kansas City Royals	5	6	0.455	51	52
Texas Rangers	6	4	0.600	46	28
Div Total	11	10	0.524	97	80
Season Total	20	17	0.541	188	157

Month	Games	Won	Lost	Win %	RS	RA
Total

	Games	Won	Lost	Win %	RS	RA
Home
Away
Total

=== Postseason Game log ===
Legend
	Yankees win
	Yankees loss
**Bold**	Yankees team member

1978 Postseason game log: 7–3 (Home: 5–0; Away: 2–3)
AL Championship Series vs. Kansas City Royals 3–1 (Home: 2–0; Away: 1–1)

#	Date	Time (ET)	Opponent	Score	Win	Loss	Save	Time of Game	Attendance	Series	Box/ Streak
1	October 3	8:30 p.m. EDT	@ Royals	**W** 7–1	**Beattie** (1–0)	Leonard (0–1)	**Clay** (1)	2:57	41,143	NYA 1–0	W1
2	October 4	3:30 p.m. EDT	@ Royals	L 4–10	Gura (1–0)	**Figueroa** (0–1)	—	2:42	41,158	Tied 1–1	L1
3	October 6	3:30 p.m. EDT	Royals	**W** 6–5	**Gossage** (1–0)	Bird (0–1)	—	2:13	55,445	NYA 2–1	W1
4	October 7	8:30 p.m. EDT	Royals	**W** 2–1	**Guidry** (1–0)	Leonard (0–2)	**Gossage** (1)	2:20	56,356	NYA 3–1	W2

World Series: vs. Los Angeles Dodgers 4–2 (Home: 3–0; Away: 1–2)

#	Date	Time (ET)	Opponent	Score	Win	Loss	Save	Time of Game	Attendance	Series	Box/ Streak
1	October 10	8:30 p.m. EDT	@ Dodgers	L 5–11	John (1–0)	**Figueroa** (0–1)	—	2:48	55,997	LAD 1–0	L1
2	October 11	8:30 p.m. EDT	@ Dodgers	L 3–4	Hooton (1–0)	**Hunter** (0–1)	Welch (1)	2:37	55,982	LAD 2–0	L2
3	October 13	8:30 p.m. EDT	Dodgers	**W** 5–1	**Guidry** (1–0)	Sutton(0–1)	—	2:27	56,447	LAD 2–1	W1
4	October 14	3:30 p.m. EDT	Dodgers	**W** 4–3 (10)	**Gossage** (1–0)	Welch (0–1)	—	3:17	56,445	Tied 2–2	W2
5	October 15	4:30 p.m. EDT	Dodgers	**W** 12–2	**Beattie** (1–0)	Hooton (1–1)	—	2:56	56,448	NYA 3–2	W3
6	October 17	8:30 p.m. EDT	@ Dodgers	**W** 7–2	**Hunter** (1–1)	Sutton (0–2)	—	2:34	55,985	NYA 4–2	W4

== Player stats ==
= Indicates team leader

=== Batting ===
==== Starters by position ====
Note: Pos = Position; G = Games played; AB = At bats; H = Hits; Avg. = Batting average; HR = Home runs; RBI = Runs batted in

Pos	Player	G	AB	H	Avg.	HR	RBI
C	Thurman Munson	154	617	183	.297	6	71
1B	Chris Chambliss	162	625	171	.274	12	90
2B	Willie Randolph	134	499	139	.279	3	42
3B	Graig Nettles	159	587	162	.276	27	93
SS	Bucky Dent	123	379	92	.243	5	40
LF	Lou Piniella	130	472	148	.314	6	69
CF	Mickey Rivers	141	559	148	.265	11	48
RF	Reggie Jackson	139	511	140	.274	27	97
DH	Cliff Johnson	76	174	32	.184	6	19

==== Other batters ====
Note: G = Games played; AB = At bats; H = Hits; Avg. = Batting average; HR = Home runs; RBI = Runs batted in

Player	G	AB	H	Avg.	HR	RBI
Roy White	103	346	93	.269	8	43
Fred Stanley	81	160	35	.219	1	9
Jim Spencer	71	150	34	.227	7	24
Paul Blair	75	125	22	.176	2	13
Gary Thomasson	54	116	32	.276	3	20
Mike Heath	33	92	21	.228	0	8
Jay Johnstone	36	65	17	.262	1	6
Brian Doyle	39	52	10	.192	0	0
Dámaso García	18	41	8	.195	0	1
George Zeber	3	6	0	.000	0	0
Dell Alston	3	3	0	.000	0	0
Mickey Klutts	1	2	2	1.000	0	0
Dennis Sherrill	2	1	0	.000	0	0
Fran Healy	1	1	0	.000	0	0
Domingo Ramos	1	0	0	----	0	0

=== Pitching ===
= Indicates league leader

==== Starting pitchers ====
Note: G = Games pitched; IP = Innings pitched; W = Wins; L = Losses; ERA = Earned run average; SO = Strikeouts

Player	G	IP	W	L	ERA	SO
Ron Guidry	35	273.2	25	3	1.74	248
Ed Figueroa	35	253.0	20	9	2.99	92
Dick Tidrow	31	185.0	7	11	3.84	73
Jim Beattie	25	128.0	6	9	3.73	65
Catfish Hunter	21	118.0	12	6	3.58	56
Don Gullett	8	44.2	4	2	3.63	28
Andy Messersmith	6	22.1	0	3	5.64	16

==== Other pitchers ====
Note: G = Games pitched; IP = Innings pitched; W = Wins; L = Losses; ERA = Earned run average; SO = Strikeouts

Player	G	IP	W	L	ERA	SO
Ken Clay	28	75.2	3	4	4.28	32
Paul Lindblad	7	18.1	0	0	4.42	9
Ken Holtzman	5	17.2	1	0	4.08	3
Larry McCall	5	16.0	1	1	5.63	7
Dave Rajsich	4	13.1	0	0	4.05	9

==== Relief pitchers ====
Note: G = Games pitched; W = Wins; L = Losses; SV = Saves; ERA = Earned run average; SO = Strikeouts

Player	G	W	L	SV	ERA	SO
Goose Gossage	63	10	11	27	2.01	122
Sparky Lyle	59	9	3	9	3.47	33
Rawly Eastwick	8	2	1	0	3.28	13
Bob Kammeyer	7	0	0	0	5.82	11
Ron Davis	4	0	0	0	11.57	0

== Postseason ==
=== ALCS ===
==== Game 1 ====
October 3: Royals Stadium

Team	1	2	3	4	5	6	7	8	9	R	H	E
New York	0	1	1	0	2	0	0	3	0	7	16	0
Kansas City	0	0	0	0	0	1	0	0	0	1	2	2
W: Jim Beattie (1–0) L: Dennis Leonard (0–1) S: Ken Clay (1)
HRs: NYY – Reggie Jackson (1)

==== Game 2 ====
October 4: Royals Stadium

Team	1	2	3	4	5	6	7	8	9	R	H	E
New York	0	0	0	0	0	0	2	2	0	4	12	1
Kansas City	1	4	0	0	0	0	3	2	X	10	16	1
W: Larry Gura (1–0) L: Ed Figueroa (0–1)
HRs: KCR – Freddie Patek (1)

==== Game 3 ====
October 6: Yankee Stadium

Team	1	2	3	4	5	6	7	8	9	R	H	E
Kansas City	1	0	1	0	1	0	0	2	0	5	10	1
New York	0	1	0	2	0	1	0	2	X	6	10	0
W: Goose Gossage (1–0) L: Doug Bird (0–1)
HRs: KCR – George Brett 3 (3) NYY – Reggie Jackson (2) Thurman Munson (1)

==== Game 4 ====
October 7: Yankee Stadium

Team	1	2	3	4	5	6	7	8	9	R	H	E
Kansas City	1	0	0	0	0	0	0	0	0	1	7	0
New York	0	1	0	0	0	1	0	0	X	2	4	0
W: Ron Guidry (1–0) L: Dennis Leonard (0–2) S: Goose Gossage (1)
HRs: NYY – Graig Nettles (1) Roy White (1)

=== World Series ===
AL New York Yankees (4) vs. NL Los Angeles Dodgers (2)
Game	Score	Date	Location	Attendance	Time of Game
1	Yankees – 5, Dodgers – 11	October 10	Dodger Stadium	55,997	2:48
2	Yankees – 3, Dodgers – 4	October 11	Dodger Stadium	55,982	2:37
3	Dodgers – 1, Yankees – 5	October 13	Yankee Stadium	56,447	2:27
4	Dodgers – 3, Yankees – 4 (10 inns)	October 14	Yankee Stadium	56,445	3:17
5	Dodgers – 2, Yankees – 12	October 15	Yankee Stadium	56,448	2:56
6	Yankees – 7, Dodgers – 2	October 17	Dodger Stadium	55,985	2:34

== Awards and honors ==
- Gold Glove Awards
  - Chris Chambliss, first baseman
  - Graig Nettles, third baseman
- Bucky Dent, Babe Ruth Award
- Bucky Dent, World Series MVP
- Goose Gossage, Rolaids Relief Man of the Year Award
- Ron Guidry, AL Cy Young

=== Franchise records ===
- Ron Guidry, Yankees single season record, most strikeouts in a season (248)

=== All-Stars ===
All-Star Game

- Guidry, Gossage, Reggie Jackson, Thurman Munson, and Graig Nettles represented the Yankees.

=== Other team leaders ===
- Stolen Bases – Willie Randolph, 36
- Walks – Willie Randolph, 82

== Farm system ==
Level	Team	League	Manager
AAA	Tacoma Yankees	Pacific Coast League	Mike Ferraro
AA	West Haven Yankees	Eastern League	Stump Merrill
A	Fort Lauderdale Yankees	Florida State League	Doug Holmquist
A-Short Season	Oneonta Yankees	New York–Penn League	Art Mazmanian

LEAGUE CO-CHAMPION: Tacoma
