= Don Kirkwood =

American baseball player (born 1949)

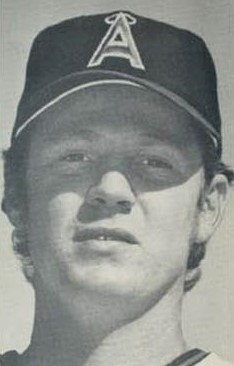
- Pitcher
- Born: September 24, 1949 (age 75); Pontiac, Michigan, U.S.
- Batted: Right Threw: Right

MLB debut
- September 13, 1974, for the California Angels

Last MLB appearance
- October 1, 1978, for the Toronto Blue Jays

MLB statistics
- Win–loss record: 18–23
- Earned run average: 4.37
- Strikeouts: 194
- Stats at Baseball Reference

Teams
- California Angels (1974–1977); Chicago White Sox (1977); Toronto Blue Jays (1978)

Donald Paul Kirkwood (born September 24, 1949) is an American former professional baseball pitcher who played five seasons for the California Angels, Chicago White Sox, and Toronto Blue Jays of Major League Baseball (MLB). Kirkwood attended Oakland University.

== Professional career ==
In his first three minor league seasons, he had a win–loss record of 20–14 before making his MLB debut. His best season was 1975 with a win–loss record of 6–5 and an era of 3.11.

== Personal life ==
In January 2020, he was inducted in the Hollie L. Lepely Hall of Honor class. He currently works at a total sports complex, giving pitching lessons.
