= Butch Alberts =

American baseball player (born 1950)

- Designated hitter
- Born: May 4, 1950 (age 76); Williamsport, Pennsylvania, U.S.
- Batted: Right Threw: Right

MLB debut
- September 7, 1978, for the Toronto Blue Jays

Last MLB appearance
- September 28, 1978, for the Toronto Blue Jays

MLB statistics
- Batting average: .278
- Home runs: 0
- Runs batted in: 0
- Stats at Baseball Reference

Teams
- Toronto Blue Jays (1978)

Francis Burt Alberts (born May 4, 1950) is an American former professional baseball designated hitter, who played for the Toronto Blue Jays of Major League Baseball (MLB) in 1978.

== Biography ==
Alberts was born in Williamsport, Pennsylvania, United States. He graduated from Gettysburg High School in Gettysburg, Pennsylvania in 1968, and was selected to play the Big 33 Football Classic as a wide receiver. Following high school, he played football and baseball at the University of Cincinnati.

He was the 28th round pick in the 1972 amateur draft of the Pittsburgh Pirates.

His only major league appearances occurred with the Toronto Blue Jays in 1978. He appeared in six games for the Blue Jays, hitting .278 for his career. He was later traded to the California Angels, but did not appear in any major league games with them.
