= Bob Sykes (baseball) =

American baseball player (born 1954)

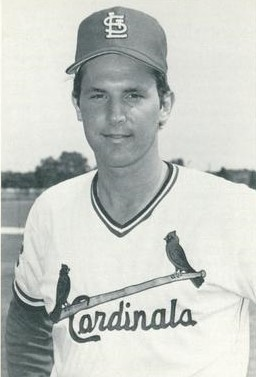
- Pitcher
- Born: December 11, 1954 (age 71); Neptune Township, New Jersey, U.S.
- Batted: Switch Threw: Left

MLB debut
- April 9, 1977, for the Detroit Tigers

Last MLB appearance
- October 4, 1981, for the St. Louis Cardinals

MLB statistics
- Win–loss record: 23–26
- Earned run average: 4.65
- Strikeouts: 215
- Stats at Baseball Reference

Teams
- Detroit Tigers (1977–1978); St. Louis Cardinals (1979–1981)

Robert Joseph Sykes (born December 11, 1954) is an American former professional baseball pitcher. He played during five seasons in Major League Baseball (MLB) for the Detroit Tigers and St. Louis Cardinals.

Born in Neptune Township, New Jersey, Sykes played prep baseball at St. Rose High School.

Sykes was drafted by the Tigers in the 19th round of the 1974 MLB draft. He played his first professional season with their Rookie level Bristol Tigers in 1974. Rarely a starter for most of his career, Sykes was moved to the bullpen for the majority of his final major league season with the Cardinals in 1981. He split his last season between the New York Yankees' Double-A Nashville Sounds and Triple-A Columbus Clippers in 1982 after being traded from St. Louis for Willie McGee on October 21, 1981.

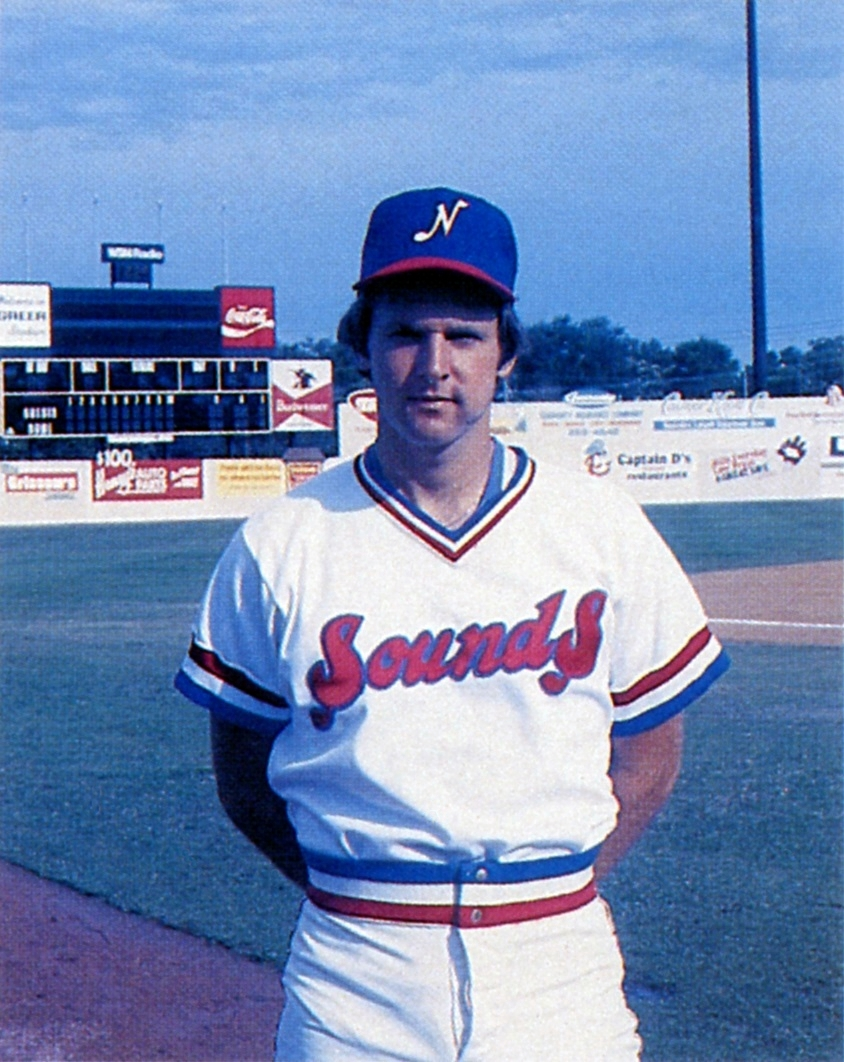
Sykes with the Nashville Sounds in 1982
