= Steve Baker (baseball) =

American baseball player (born 1956)

- Pitcher
- Born: August 30, 1956 (age 69); Eugene, Oregon, U.S.
- Batted: Right Threw: Right

MLB debut
- May 25, 1978, for the Detroit Tigers

Last MLB appearance
- September 27, 1983, for the St. Louis Cardinals

MLB statistics
- Win–loss record: 7–16
- Earned run average: 5.13
- Strikeouts: 131
- Stats at Baseball Reference

Teams
- Detroit Tigers (1978–1979); Oakland Athletics (1982–1983); St. Louis Cardinals (1983)

Steven Byrne Baker (born August 30, 1956) is an American former Major League Baseball (MLB) pitcher who played for four seasons. He pitched for the Detroit Tigers from 1978 to 1979, the Oakland Athletics from 1982 to 1983, and the St. Louis Cardinals in 1983. He was originally drafted by the New York Mets in the 18th round of the 1974 MLB draft, but did not sign with them, instead choosing to attend college at the University of Oregon. With things not working out in Oregon, Baker left school his freshman year and returned to El Cajon, California. Baker regrouped and was masterful in a season with the Grossmont Junior College Baseball team in El Cajon and he signed with the Detroit Tigers as an amateur free agent on May 10, 1976.

After spending part of the 1978 season in the minor leagues, Baker made his major league debut on May 25, 1978. In a contest against the Baltimore Orioles, he pitched 6 1/3 innings, striking out six and allowing one earned run as the Tigers lost to the Orioles, 2–1. Baker made 15 appearances for the Tigers, starting ten games, earning two wins, four losses, and an earned run average (ERA) of 4.55. Baker also made 16 appearances for the Evansville Triplets of the American Association, the AAA-level minor league affiliate of the Tigers. In those appearances, Baker made 16 starts, won eight, lost one, threw four complete games, three shutouts, and earned an ERA of 3.21. Baker began the 1979 season as a part of the Tigers rotation as a spot starter. He played 21 games, starting 12 of them. After posting a 1–7 record and a 6.64 ERA, Baker was sent back to Evansville, where he finished out the season. After spending nine games with Evansville in 1980, he was purchased by the Toronto Blue Jays on June 6, 1980.

Baker spent the rest of the season with the Syracuse Chiefs, the Blue Jays AAA minor league team. He had a 6–5 record with a 3.20 ERA in 17 starts at Syracuse, and the following season Baker had a record of 8 wins and 14 losses. He was released by the Blue Jays on January 28, 1982, and was signed by the Oakland Athletics as a free agent on March 9. Baker spent most of 1982 with the Tacoma Tigers, where he had his best professional season: 13 wins, 5 losses, a 2.48 ERA, and nine complete games. After being called up to the Athletics in September and playing five games, he had his most productive major league season in 1983. He pitched in 35 games in relief for Oakland before he was traded to the St. Louis Cardinals on September 2, 1983, for players to be named later (Tom Dozier and Jim Strichek). He played eight games in relief for the Cardinals, his last appearance coming on September 27, 1983. He spent three more years in the minor leagues before retiring.
