= Tom Murphy (pitcher) =

American baseball player (born 1945)

- Pitcher
- Born: December 30, 1945 (age 80); Cleveland, Ohio, U.S.
- Batted: Right Threw: Right

MLB debut
- June 13, 1968, for the California Angels

Last MLB appearance
- May 8, 1979, for the Toronto Blue Jays

MLB statistics
- Win–loss record: 68–101
- Earned run average: 3.78
- Strikeouts: 621
- Saves: 59
- Stats at Baseball Reference

Teams
- California Angels (1968–1972); Kansas City Royals (1972); St. Louis Cardinals (1973); Milwaukee Brewers (1974–1976); Boston Red Sox (1976–1977); Toronto Blue Jays (1977–1979)

Thomas Andrew Murphy (born December 30, 1945) is an American former Major League Baseball pitcher.

== Early years ==
While pitching at Ohio University, the nineteen year old was originally drafted by the Houston Astros in the 18th round of the 1965 Major League Baseball draft, but did not sign. A year later, the San Francisco Giants drafted Murphy in the fourth round of the secondary phase of the draft, but he again did not sign. Finally, when the California Angels selected him sixth overall in the January 1967 draft, he signed.

Murphy hit the ground running in his first assignment in professional baseball with the Midwest League Quad Cities Angels. In six games, he went 5–1 with a 2.34 earned run average to earn a quick promotion to double A. In eight games with the El Paso Sun Kings, Murphy maintained a 2.76 ERA to earn a second promotion to the triple A Pacific Coast League's Seattle Angels, where he would finish out the 1967 season.

== California Angels ==
Following brief stints in El Paso and Seattle, Murphy was called up to the majors early in the 1968 season. After striking out seven in a no decision in his major league debut, Murphy earned a complete game victory over the New York Yankees in his second start. Murphy's own error in the third inning accounted for the Yankees' one unearned run. He was a hard luck loser on July 28 against the Chicago White Sox. After a rough first inning in which he gave up two runs, Murphy settled in to pitch seven innings of one hit ball. The Angels, however, were only able to plate one run off Jack Fisher. For the season, Murphy went 5–6 with a 2.17 ERA in fifteen starts.

Murphy was cursed with wildness in 1969. He led the American League with sixteen wild pitches and 21 hit batsmen on his way to a 10–16 record and 4.21 ERA. He rebounded with a career year in 1970. On May 7, he pitched his first career shutout over the Washington Senators. He went 16-13 for the season, the only season of his career in which he had a winning record. It was also his best season with the bat. He had a career bests .184 batting average and seven runs batted in. He also hit his only career home run off the Milwaukee Brewers' Lew Krausse Jr.

The wheels came off for Murphy in 1971. After winning his first start of the season, he dropped his next five decisions. He would also lose his final six decisions despite a relatively mild 3.31 ERA over that span. In Murphy's 36 starts, the Angels were shut out eight times, and scored just one run nine times, resulting in a 6–17 record.

== Kansas City Royals ==
In 1972, Murphy appeared in six games for the Angels, all in relief, when he was traded to the Kansas City Royals for Bob Oliver. He made three appearances out of the bullpen before he was moved into the starting rotation. He made his first start against his former franchise, and while he made a quality start (7 IP, 2 R), he came out on the losing end. He was 3–1 with a high 5.81 ERA when an injury kept him off the field for all of July and August. When he returned, he pitched his only shutout of the season before being shifted back to the bullpen for the remainder of the season. He earned his first career save against the Angels on September 19.

Despite the institution of the designated hitter in the American League in 1973, Murphy had two at bats on June 12, 1974, in an extra innings game between the Brewers and Royals. In the eleventh inning, he connected for a single to center off Marty Pattin.

== St. Louis Cardinals ==
Murphy began the 1973 season in triple A. After three games with the Omaha Royals, he was traded to the St. Louis Cardinals for Al Santorini. Murphy got off to a rough start with the Cardinals. On June 29, he was 0-3 despite a 2.37 ERA. A complete game loss to the Montreal Expos on August 2 followed by poor outings against the New York Mets and Cincinnati Reds led to him being moved to the bullpen toward the end of the season. He went 3–7 with a 3.76 ERA his only season in St. Louis. He was traded to the Milwaukee Brewers for Bob Heise on December 8, 1973.

== Milwaukee Brewers ==
For the 1974 season, Brewers manager Del Crandall and pitching coach Al Widmar converted Murphy into a full-time reliever. He soon evolved into Crandall's favorite arm out of the bullpen. He pitched two innings of no hit ball when he earned his first save of the season on April 26, giving him a total of twelve innings pitched with just one earned run. From July 8 through August 8, Murphy pitched twenty innings in which he gave up only seven hits and did not give up a run. He suffered his tenth loss of the season in a seventeen inning marathon with the Baltimore Orioles when Brewers third baseman Don Money misplayed a ground ball (no error was charged on the play). He won in extra innings against the Yankees on the second to last day of the season to close out the season with an even 10–10 record. In what was unquestionably his best season as a reliever, he led the American League with 66 games closed, and was second in the AL with twenty saves. He led the Brewers with a 1.90 ERA, ten wins and 123 innings pitched in relief.

He matched his twenty save total in 1975, however, with a 1–9 record, and an inflated 4.90 ERA. He was hit hard, and took a loss at the hands of the Yankees in his first appearance of the 1976 season, but settled down somewhat from there (18 IP, 11 ER) when he and pitcher turned outfielder Bobby Darwin were traded to the Boston Red Sox for 1975 World Series hero Bernie Carbo at the June trade deadline.

== Boston Red Sox ==
Shortly after Murphy joined the Bosox, Reggie Cleveland was converted back into a starter, and Murphy and Jim Willoughby shared the brunt of the relief duties. Murphy pitched poorly in his first two games with the Red Sox. In his first game against the Oakland Athletics, he entered in the ninth inning with no outs and a runner on second. He gave up a single to the first batter he faced (Sal Bando) and hit Gene Tenace with a pitch to load the bases. Exceptional defense from the Sox infield prevented any runs from scoring.

He wasn't so lucky in his next appearance. Murphy entered in the eighth with a runner on second and two outs. Tenace hit what should have been an inning ending ground ball to third, however, a throwing error by third baseman Steve Dillard allowed the runner to score and kept the inning alive. After an intentional walk to Billy Williams, doubles by Phil Garner and Tim Hosley scored three unearned runs to give Oakland an 8–5 lead and make Murphy the pitcher of record on the losing end without giving up an earned run. A walk to Bill North knocked Murphy out of the game without recording an out.

From there, he rebounded with wins in his next two decisions. He ended up going 4–5 with a 3.44 ERA his first season in Boston. His eight saves and 81 innings out of the bullpen were second only to Willoughby.

Boston suffered an embarrassing 19–9 loss to the Cleveland Indians in the second game of the 1977 season. Murphy pitched 1.1 innings, and surrendered three runs. A week later, he suffered his first loss of the season to the Indians. A horrible month of May (10.61 ERA) got him relegated to "mop up duty" until he was placed on waivers midway through the season. On July 27, he was claimed by the expansion Toronto Blue Jays.

== Toronto Blue Jays ==
Going from a pennant contender to a last place club seemed to do Murphy some good. He earned his first save of the season in his second game in a Jays uniform. Two weeks later, he got his first win of the season against the Royals. He made his first start in over four years on September 11, and held the Yankees to one run in six innings for his second win. All told, he went 2–1 with two saves and a 3.63 ERA for Toronto.

Murphy began the 1978 season as the Jays' closer, earning six saves through the month of June. Once Víctor Cruz joined the club in mid June, Murphy shifted into more of a long reliever role. He led Blue Jays relievers with 94 innings pitched and was second to Cruz with seven saves and six wins.

He made ten appearances with the Jays in 1979, going 1–2 with a 5.40 ERA, before he was released on May 12.
