= Balor Moore =

American baseball player (born 1951)

- Pitcher
- Born: January 25, 1951 (age 74); Smithville, Texas, U.S.
- Batted: Left Threw: Left

MLB debut
- May 21, 1970, for the Montreal Expos

Last MLB appearance
- August 6, 1980, for the Toronto Blue Jays

MLB statistics
- Win–loss record: 28–48
- Earned run average: 4.52
- Strikeouts: 496
- Stats at Baseball Reference

Teams
- Montreal Expos (1970, 1972–1974); California Angels (1977); Toronto Blue Jays (1978–1980)

Balor Lilbon Moore (born January 25, 1951) is an American former professional baseball player. He played in the major leagues as a left-handed pitcher between 1970 and 1980. Moore was the first player drafted by the Montreal Expos expansion team in the 1969 Major League Baseball draft (22nd overall). He also pitched for the California Angels and the Toronto Blue Jays.

== Expos phenom ==
Moore went a combined 9-1 with a 0.41 earned run average in the Gulf Coast League and Florida State League in his first professional baseball season, at the Rookie and High A levels. After going 3–0 with a 0.72 ERA for the High A West Palm Beach Expos to start the 1970 season, Moore made the jump all the way to the Triple A Buffalo Bisons. He made his major league debut at the age of 19 on May 21, 1970 against the Pittsburgh Pirates. He faced one batter, Willie Stargell, who lined out to left field. Moore pitched a total of 9.2 innings in the majors that season, going 0–2 with a 7.45 ERA.

Moore struggled in 1972, going 2–11 with a 6.33 ERA for Triple A Winnipeg. After a year in the army, Moore went 5–3 with a 0.63 ERA for the Double A Quebec Carnavals in 1972 to earn a second promotion to Montreal.

== Montreal Expos ==
Moore was roughed up in his first four starts, going 0–3 with a 6.45 ERA. He turned his season around on July 14 with a complete game 9–1 victory over the Los Angeles Dodgers. From there, Moore went 9–6 with a 2.94 ERA, including a 25 inning scoreless-inning streak broken on September 16 by Philadelphia Phillies rookie Mike Schmidt's first major league home run. For the season, the left-hander made 22 starts and struck out 161 hitters in 147.2 innings.

That winter he pitched a perfect game for San Juan in Puerto Rico, the first nine-inning perfect game in that league's 36-year history. Moore's record dipped to 7–16 in 1973, mostly due to an increase in walks (109 compared to 59 the previous season). Still Moore struck out an average of 7.71 batters per nine innings, second in the National League, and held batters to a .233 batting average, tenth in the league.

== Later career ==
Moore injured his ankle during spring training in 1974, and his arm early in the season. He went 0–3 with a 10.20 ERA in six rehab appearances with the Triple A Memphis Blues before undergoing major elbow surgery during that off-season.

Moore returned in 1975, although he never attained the same form.

He was 1–3 with a 4.00 ERA for Memphis when his contract was sold to the California Angels. Moore earned a September call-up to the Angels in 1977, going 0–2 with a 3.97 ERA. After just one season in California, Moore's contract was sold to the Toronto Blue Jays.

Moore spent the final three seasons of his career with the Blue Jays, going 12–17 with a 4.96 ERA. He pitched four innings to earn the only save of his career on April 27, 1980 against the Milwaukee Brewers. He spent 1981 in the minors with the Brewers and Houston Astros before officially retiring.

== Career stats ==
W	L	PCT	ERA	G	GS	CG	SHO	SV	IP	H	ER	R	HR	BB	K	WP	HBP	Fld%
28	48	.368	4.52	180	98	16	4	1	718.1	704	361	408	80	365	496	28	30	.874

Moore had a 40–58 record and 4.01 ERA in eleven minor league seasons.
