= Pablo Torrealba =

Venezuelan baseball player (born 1948)

- Pitcher
- Born: April 28, 1948 (age 78); Barquisimeto, Lara State, Venezuela
- Batted: Left Threw: Left

MLB debut
- April 9, 1975, for the Atlanta Braves

Last MLB appearance
- April 12, 1979, for the Chicago White Sox

MLB statistics
- Win–loss record: 6–13
- Earned run average: 3.27
- Strikeouts: 113
- Stats at Baseball Reference

Teams
- Atlanta Braves (1975–1976); Oakland Athletics (1977); Chicago White Sox (1978–1979)

Pablo Arnoldo Torrealba [tor-ray-ahl'-bah] (born April 28, 1948) is a Venezuelan former professional baseball pitcher.

== Career ==
He played in Major League Baseball (MLB) from 1975 through 1979 for the Atlanta Braves, Oakland Athletics, and Chicago White Sox.

Listed at 6 ft 1 in (1.85 m), 185 pounds (84 kg), Torrealba batted and threw left handed. He was born in Barquisimeto, Lara. His son, Steve Torrealba, is a former catcher who also played for the Braves organization.

In a five-season career, Torrealba posted a 6–13 record with 113 strike outs and a 3.27 ERA in 239 innings pitched.

== See also ==
- List of Major League Baseball players from Venezuela
- List of second-generation Major League Baseball players
