= Lary Sorensen =

American baseball player (born 1955)

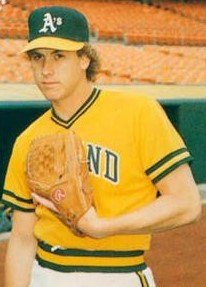
- Pitcher
- Born: October 4, 1955 (age 70); Detroit, Michigan, U.S.
- Batted: Right Threw: Right

MLB debut
- June 7, 1977, for the Milwaukee Brewers

Last MLB appearance
- September 24, 1988, for the San Francisco Giants

MLB statistics
- Win–loss record: 93–103
- Earned run average: 4.15
- Strikeouts: 569
- Stats at Baseball Reference

Teams
- Milwaukee Brewers (1977–1980); St. Louis Cardinals (1981); Cleveland Indians (1982–1983); Oakland Athletics (1984); Chicago Cubs (1985); Montreal Expos (1987); San Francisco Giants (1988)

Career highlights and awards
- All-Star (1978)

Lary Alan Sorensen (born October 4, 1955) is an American former Major League Baseball (MLB) pitcher who played for the Milwaukee Brewers (1977–1980), St. Louis Cardinals (1981), Cleveland Indians (1982–1983), Oakland Athletics (1984), Chicago Cubs (1985), Montreal Expos (1987) and San Francisco Giants (1988).

== Baseball career ==
Sorensen attended the University of Michigan, and in 1975 he played collegiate summer baseball with the Falmouth Commodores of the Cape Cod Baseball League. He was selected by the Brewers in the 8th round of the 1976 MLB draft.

In an 11-season career, Sorensen posted a 93–103 record with a 4.15 ERA and 69 complete games, 10 shutouts, 569 strikeouts and 402 walks in 346 games (235 as a starter) totalling 1,736.1 innings pitched.

In 1978, Sorensen won a career-high 18 games for the Brewers and made the American League All-Star team. He worked three innings and, after allowing a leadoff infield single to Larry Bowa, retired nine batters in a row: Reggie Smith, Pete Rose, Joe Morgan, George Foster, Greg Luzinski, Steve Garvey, Ted Simmons, Dave Winfield, and Bowa.

Sorensen ranked fifth in the A.L. in complete games in both 1978 (17) and 1979 (16). He led N.L. pitchers with 15 putouts in 1981.

For his career, Sorensen averaged 2.084 walks per nine innings pitched.

== Drug and alcohol problems ==
On February 28, 1986, Sorensen and ten others were suspended for admitting during the Pittsburgh drug trials that they were involved in cocaine abuse. While seven were initially suspended for the entire season, Sorensen was given a shorter 60-day suspension. All eleven were allowed to forgo their suspension after agreeing to large anti-drug donations and community service.

Sorensen's record of substance abuse continued after his playing days, including numerous DUI convictions. On October 16, 1999, he was picked up with a BAC of .35%.

Sorensen's sixth offense resulted in a multi-year prison sentence after he drove his car into a ditch in Chesterfield, Michigan with a .31 BAC.

Sorensen has been arrested for drunken driving seven times and twice served time in prison; most recently being released in December 2009.

== Post-playing career ==
Sorensen became a broadcaster while still an active player, working as a sports reporter for WTMJ-TV Channel 4 in Milwaukee during the offseason. After his playing career ended, he served as a color analyst for major league and college baseball games on ESPN from 1990 to 1994. From July 1994 to February 1995, he co-hosted a morning show called The Morning Battery with Butch Stearns on Detroit's WDFN Radio. He then went to Detroit's WJR radio, where he partnered with Frank Beckmann to call games for the Detroit Tigers Radio Network from 1995 to 1998. Sorensen left the Tigers in June 1998 for undisclosed personal reasons and was replaced by Jim Price.

After serving his first prison sentence, Sorensen worked at a McDonald's restaurant in Roseville, Michigan, for three months. He also worked at a storage facility in St. Clair Shores, Michigan.

In 2014, Sorensen returned to broadcasting, providing radio color commentary for Wake Forest University baseball and television color commentary for the Winston-Salem Dash (Chicago White Sox Class High-A team in the Carolina League). He began doing radio color commentary for Wake Forest football in 2017.

== See also ==
- List of sportspeople sanctioned for doping offences
