= Mike Willis (baseball) =

American baseball player (born 1950)

- Pitcher
- Born: December 26, 1950 (age 74); Oklahoma City, Oklahoma, U.S.
- Batted: Left Threw: Left

MLB debut
- April 13, 1977, for the Toronto Blue Jays

Last MLB appearance
- June 11, 1981, for the Toronto Blue Jays

MLB statistics
- Win–loss record: 7–21
- Earned run average: 4.59
- Strikeouts: 149
- Stats at Baseball Reference

Teams
- Toronto Blue Jays (1977–1981)

Michael Henry Willis (born December 26, 1950) is an American former Major League Baseball player who played for the Toronto Blue Jays from 1977 to 1981. He batted and threw left-handed. He is 6 ft 2 in (1.88 m) and weighed 210 lbs. He attended Vanderbilt University. He was born on December 26, 1950, in Oklahoma City, Oklahoma. He was drafted by the Baltimore Orioles in 1972.

In 1978, he was one of three left-handers named "Mike" (the others being Mike Flanagan and Mike Caldwell) to defeat the New York Yankees' Ron Guidry in 1978 during Guidry's 25–3 Cy Young season. Normally a relief pitcher, Willis was pressed into service as the Toronto Blue Jays starter on September 20, 1978, and led the Jays to an 8–1 victory over the Yankees and Guidry. Calling it "the game of my life", it was Willis' only career win as a starting pitcher, and his only career complete game.
