= Jerry Garvin =

American baseball player (born 1955)

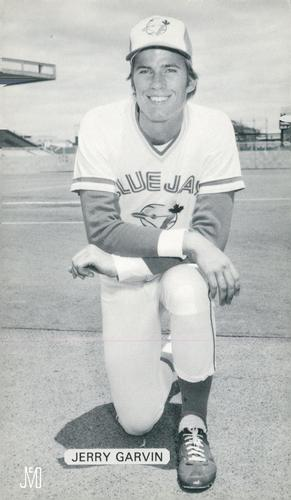
- Pitcher
- Born: October 21, 1955 (age 70); Oakland, California, U.S.
- Batted: Left Threw: Left

MLB debut
- April 10, 1977, for the Toronto Blue Jays

Last MLB appearance
- September 29, 1982, for the Toronto Blue Jays

MLB statistics
- Win–loss record: 20–41
- Earned run average: 4.43
- Strikeouts: 320
- Stats at Baseball Reference

Teams
- Toronto Blue Jays (1977–1982)

Theodore Jared Garvin (born October 21, 1955) is an American former professional baseball player who pitched a total of six seasons in Major League Baseball (MLB) with the Toronto Blue Jays from 1977 to 1982. He was named by Topps as their left-handed rookie pitcher of the year in 1977.

== Early life and professional baseball ==
Garvin was born on October 21, 1955, in Oakland, California. His family later moved to Merced, California, where he played baseball for Merced High School. He was initially drafted by the Baltimore Orioles of the American League (AL) in the 17th round of the 1973 Major League Baseball draft that was held on June 5, but did not sign a contract with the team. He re-entered the draft in time for the January secondary draft held on January 9, when he was drafted by the Minnesota Twins, also of the AL. He signed with the Twins franchise and was assigned to the class-A Wisconsin Rapids Twins of the Midwest League.

== Major league career ==
Garvin began his pitching career with four wins by the end of April, the first rookie to do so in baseball history. He was battling influenza when he was defeated by the Yankees on June 30, his fourth consecutive loss. He finished the season with a record of 10–18, and became known for his ability to pick off runners at first. In fact, Garvin established an unofficial Major League record of 26 pickoffs in the 1977 season, although this was not recognized in the record books; official statistics had never distinguished between pickoffs and runners caught stealing by any other method.

His 34 games started stands as the Blue Jays' rookie record, though tied by Gustavo Chacín in 2006. He surrendered 33 home runs during the season, the most allowed by a Blue Jays pitcher until Woody Williams allowed 36 in 1998.

Garvin fell to 4-12 in 1978, and by 1979 was primarily a reliever. In September 1979, Garvin spent some time on the disabled list, re-activated on September 1. Garvin re-signed with the Blue Jays on January 20, 1981, after appearing in a club record 61 games in 1980.

On August 20, 1982, the Blue Jays re-activated outfielder Wayne Nordhagen from the disabled list. To clear a spot for him, they optioned Garvin to the franchises' class-AAA team, the Syracuse Chiefs of the International League. At the time of the demotion, Garvin was the franchise's all-time leader in pitching appearances with 194. He was recalled to the majors for two more games in late September.

On January 18, 1983, Garvin was sold by the Blue Jays to the St. Louis Cardinals of the National League for an undisclosed amount, and was assigned to their class-AAA team, the Louisville Redbirds of the American Association. However, he was cut from the roster during spring training, and ended his professional career without ever playing for the Redbirds.

After his playing days, he has become involved in the real estate business.
