= Jim Umbarger =

American baseball player (1953–2024)

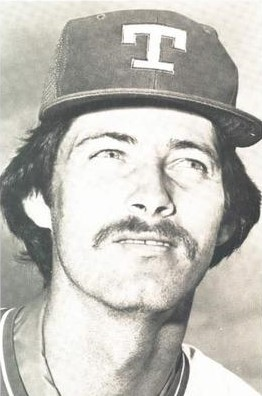
- Pitcher
- Born: February 17, 1953; Burbank, California, U.S.
- Died: August 3, 2024 (aged 71); Phoenix, Arizona, U.S.
- Batted: Left Threw: Left

MLB debut
- April 8, 1975, for the Texas Rangers

Last MLB appearance
- September 28, 1978, for the Texas Rangers

MLB statistics
- Win–loss record: 25–33
- Earned run average: 4.14
- Strikeouts: 244
- Stats at Baseball Reference

Teams
- Texas Rangers (1975–1976); Oakland Athletics (1977); Texas Rangers (1977–1978)

James Harold Umbarger (February 17, 1953 – August 5, 2024) was an American professional baseball pitcher. He attended Grant High School in Van Nuys, California, and was the 33rd pick in the 1971 Major League Baseball draft by the Cleveland Indians, but opted to attend Arizona State University. In 1974, The Sporting News named Umbarger as honorable mention on the All-America team. He was later selected in the 16th round of the 1974 Major League Baseball draft by the Texas Rangers.

Umbarger made his major league debut in April, of 1975, with the Rangers, and had a successful rookie season for the team, going 8–7 in 56 games (12 of them starts, with 2 shutouts), with a 4.12 ERA. The following season, Umbarger started 30 games for the Rangers, going 10–12 (with 3 shutouts) with a 3.15 ERA.

Prior to the 1977 season, Umbarger was traded to the Oakland Athletics, along with Rodney Scott, for outfielder Claudell Washington. Umbarger was sold back to the Rangers on August 24, 1977. He finished the 1977 season with the Rangers and returned for the 1978 campaign, appearing in 32 games and posting a 4.88 ERA. The 1978 season would be his last in the major leagues.

Umbarger continued to pitch in the minors through 1983. In 1981, he pitched 10 innings of scoreless relief in the longest professional baseball game ever played, a 33-inning marathon between Pawtucket and Rochester.

Umbarger died of heart failure in Phoenix, Arizona on August 3, 2024, at the age of 71.

== Sources ==
- Career statistics from MLB · Baseball Reference · Baseball Reference (Minors) · Retrosheet · Baseball Almanac
