= Víctor Cruz (baseball) =

Dominican baseball player (1957–2004)

Victor Cruz
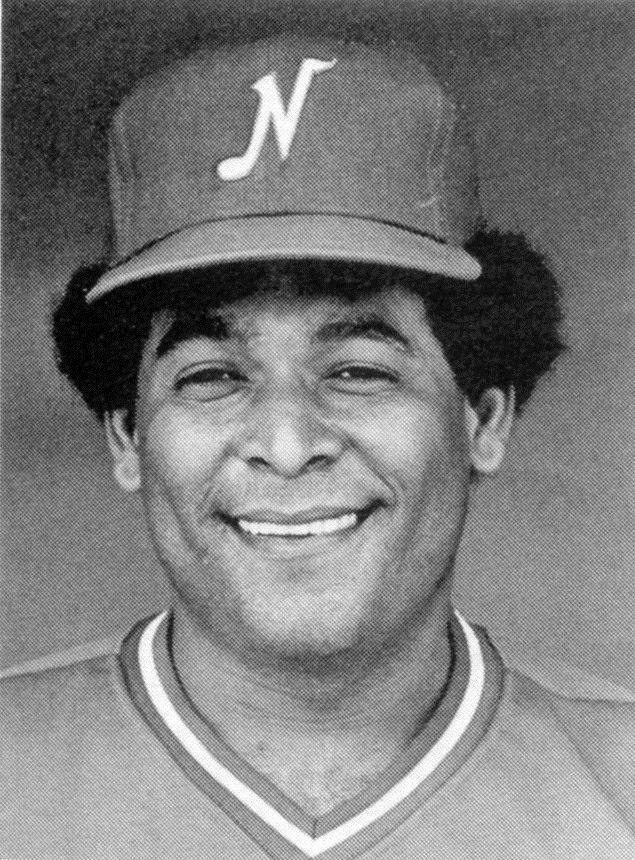
- Cruz with the Nashville Sounds in 1985
- Pitcher
- Born: December 24, 1957; Rancho Viejo, Dominican Republic
- Died: September 26, 2004 (aged 46); Santo Domingo, Dominican Republic
- Batted: Right Threw: Right

MLB debut
- June 24, 1978, for the Toronto Blue Jays

Last MLB appearance
- October 1, 1983, for the Texas Rangers

MLB statistics
- Win–loss record: 18–23
- Earned run average: 3.09
- Strikeouts: 248
- Stats at Baseball Reference

Teams
- Toronto Blue Jays (1978); Cleveland Indians (1979–1980); Pittsburgh Pirates (1981); Texas Rangers (1983)

Víctor Manuel Cruz Gil (December 24, 1957 – September 26, 2004) was a Dominican professional baseball pitcher. He played during five seasons in Major League Baseball (MLB) for the Toronto Blue Jays, Cleveland Indians, Pittsburgh Pirates, and Texas Rangers.

Cruz represented the Dominican Republic at the 1975 Pan American Games, and afterward was signed by the St. Louis Cardinals as an amateur free agent in 1976. Cruz played his first professional season with their rookie league Johnson City Cardinals, then split 1977 with the Arkansas Travelers and St. Petersburg Cardinals. After the 1977 season, he was traded to the Toronto Blue Jays with Tom Underwood for John Scott and Pete Vuckovich. Cruz spent the first half of 1978 with the Triple-A Syracuse Chiefs, where he had a 3–2 win–loss record and a 4.50 earned run average (ERA) in 25 games. He made his major league debut on June 24, and spent the rest of the season with the Blue Jays, finishing the year with a 7–3 record and a 1.71 ERA in 32 games. After the season ended, Cruz was traded to the Cleveland Indians for Phil Lansford and Alfredo Griffin.

Upon joining the Indians, Cruz modified his pitching style closer to that of Luis Tiant; the media had noted at the time that the two also had identical mustaches. Cruz spent the full season with the Indians, finishing the year with a 3–9 record and a 4.23 ERA in 61 games. He followed that up with a 6–7 record and a 3.55 ERA in 55 games in 1980. After the 1980 season, Gary Alexander, Bob Owchinko, Rafael Vasquez and Cruz were traded to the Pittsburgh Pirates for Manny Sanguillen and Bert Blyleven. Cruz began the season in the minor leagues, but was brought up to the Pirates' main roster, where he had a 1–1 record and a 2.65 ERA in 22 games.

After the 1981 season, Cruz was traded to the Texas Rangers for Nelson Norman. Cruz spent 1982 with the Denver Bears and 1983 with the Oklahoma City 89ers. After a 2.16 ERA in 30 games for Oklahoma City, he was promoted to the Rangers' major league squad, as the Rangers felt that he had both his pitching and weight under control, he had lost 39 pounds during the previous offseason. In his final major league season, Cruz had a 1–3 record with a 1.44 ERA in 17 games. His final two professional baseball seasons were spent with the Oklahoma City 89ers in 1984, and the Detroit Tigers' Triple-A Nashville Sounds in 1985.

Cruz died from liver problems in his native Dominican Republic on September 26, 2004, at the age of 46.
