= 1978 Boston Red Sox season =

Major League Baseball season

1978 Boston Red Sox
- League: American League
- Division: East
- Ballpark: Fenway Park
- City: Boston, Massachusetts
- Record: 99–64 (.607)
- Divisional place: 2nd
- Owners: Buddy LeRoux, Haywood Sullivan, Jean Yawkey
- President: Jean Yawkey
- General manager: Haywood Sullivan
- Manager: Don Zimmer
- Television: WSBK-TV, Ch. 38 (Dick Stockton, Ken Harrelson)
- Radio: WITS-AM 1510 (Ned Martin, Jim Woods)
- Stats: ESPN.com; Baseball Reference

The 1978 Boston Red Sox season was the 78th season in the franchise's Major League Baseball history. After 162 regular-season games, the Red Sox and the New York Yankees finished tied atop the American League East division, with identical 99–63 records. The teams then played a tie-breaker game, which was won by New York, 5–4. Thus, the Red Sox finished their season with a record of 99 wins and 64 losses, one game behind the Yankees, who went on to win the 1978 World Series.

== Offseason ==
- November 23, 1977: Mike Torrez was signed as a free agent by the Boston Red Sox.
- December 8, 1977: Don Aase and cash were traded by the Red Sox to the California Angels for Jerry Remy.
- December 14, 1977: Ferguson Jenkins was traded by the Red Sox to the Texas Rangers for John Poloni and cash.
- December 27, 1977: Dick Drago was signed as a free agent by the Red Sox.
- March 28, 1978: Denny Doyle was released by the Red Sox.
- March 30, 1978: Rick Wise, Mike Paxton, Ted Cox, and Bo Díaz were traded by the Red Sox to the Cleveland Indians for Dennis Eckersley and Fred Kendall.

== Regular season ==
Record by month
Month	Record		Cumulative		AL East		Ref.
Month	Won	Lost	Won	Lost	Position	GB	Ref.
April	11	9	11	9	2nd	3	
May	23	7	34	16	1st	+3	
June	18	7	52	23	1st	+8	
July	13	15	65	38	1st	+5	
August	19	10	84	48	1st	+6 1/2	
September	14	15	98	63	2nd	1	
October	1	1	99	64	2nd	1	

The Red Sox played 163 games, as a tie-breaker game was needed to determine the winner of the AL East.

=== The "Boston Massacre" ===
For several days in July, the Red Sox were 14 games ahead of the rival New York Yankees; at the end of play on July 19, Boston was 62–28 and New York was in fourth place at 48–42. However, the Yankees worked their way back. At the end of play on September 6, the Yankees had reduced the 14-game deficit to only four games, just in time for a four-game series at Fenway Park in Boston. The Yankees won all four games in the series, by a combined score of 42–9, leaving the teams tied with identical 86–56 records at the end of play on September 10. The series became known as the "Boston Massacre", named after the confrontation with British soldiers on March 5, 1770.

=== Tie-breaker game ===
The Yankees held a one-game lead over the Red Sox before the final day of the regular-season schedule. With a Red Sox win over the Toronto Blue Jays, and a Yankee loss to the Cleveland Indians, the two teams finished the season in a tie for the AL East division title, both with records of 99–63. The next day, in a tie-breaker game played at Fenway Park, the Yankees beat the Red Sox, 5–4, with the help of a memorable home run by Bucky Dent.

The Yankees went on to win the World Series in six games over the Los Angeles Dodgers. Dent went on to become an object of hatred for Red Sox fans. Ironically, 12 years later, in 1990, the Yankees fired Dent as their manager during a series at Fenway Park.

=== Season standings ===
AL East
Team	W	L	Pct.	GB	Home	Road
New York Yankees	100	63	.613	—	55‍–‍26	45‍–‍37
Boston Red Sox	99	64	.607	1	59‍–‍23	40‍–‍41
Milwaukee Brewers	93	69	.574	6½	54‍–‍27	39‍–‍42
Baltimore Orioles	90	71	.559	9	51‍–‍30	39‍–‍41
Detroit Tigers	86	76	.531	13½	47‍–‍34	39‍–‍42
Cleveland Indians	69	90	.434	29	42‍–‍36	27‍–‍54
Toronto Blue Jays	59	102	.366	40	37‍–‍44	22‍–‍58

=== Record vs. opponents ===
1978 American League record Sources:
Team	BAL	BOS	CAL	CWS	CLE	DET	KC	MIL	MIN	NYY	OAK	SEA	TEX	TOR
Baltimore	—	7–8	4–6	8–1	9–6	7–8	2–8	7–8	5–5	6–9	11–0	9–1	7–4	8–7
Boston	8–7	—	9–2	7–3	7–8	12–3	4–6	10–5	9–2	7–9	5–5	7–3	3–7	11–4
California	6–4	2–9	—	8–7	6–4	4–7	9–6	5–5	12–3	5–5	9–6	9–6	5–10	7–3
Chicago	1–8	3–7	7–8	—	8–2	2–9	8–7	4–7	8–7	1–9	7–8	7–8	11–4	4–6
Cleveland	6–9	8–7	4–6	2–8	—	5–10	5–6	5–10	5–5	6–9	4–6	8–1	1–9	10–4
Detroit	8–7	3–12	7–4	9–2	10–5	—	4–6	7–8	4–6	4–11	6–4	8–2	7–3	9–6
Kansas City	8–2	6–4	6–9	7–8	6–5	6–4	—	6–4	7–8	6–5	10–5	12–3	7–8	5–5
Milwaukee	8–7	5–10	5–5	7–4	10–5	8–7	4–6	—	4–7	10–5	9–1	5–5	6–4	12–3
Minnesota	5–5	2–9	3–12	7–8	5–5	6–4	8–7	7–4	—	3–7	9–6	6–9	6–9	6–4
New York	9–6	9–7	5–5	9–1	9–6	11–4	5–6	5–10	7–3	—	8–2	6–5	6–4	11–4
Oakland	0–11	5–5	6–9	8–7	6–4	4–6	5–10	1–9	6–9	2–8	—	13–2	6–9	7–4
Seattle	1–9	3–7	6–9	8–7	1–8	2–8	3–12	5–5	9–6	5–6	2–13	—	3–12	8–2
Texas	4–7	7–3	10–5	4–11	9–1	3–7	8–7	4–6	9–6	4–6	9–6	12–3	—	4–7
Toronto	7–8	4–11	3–7	6–4	4–10	6–9	5–5	3–12	4–6	4–11	4–7	2–8	7–4	—

=== Notable transactions ===
- May 20, 1978: Bob Ojeda was signed as an amateur free agent by the Red Sox.

=== Opening Day lineup ===
2	Jerry Remy	2B
7	Rick Burleson	SS
14	Jim Rice	DH
8	Carl Yastrzemski	LF
27	Carlton Fisk	C
19	Fred Lynn	CF
15	George Scott	1B
24	Dwight Evans	RF
4	Butch Hobson	3B
21	Mike Torrez	P

=== Roster ===
1978 Boston Red Sox
Roster
Pitchers: 16 Tom Burgmeier; 22 Bill Campbell; 26 Reggie Cleveland; 41 Dick Drago; 43 Dennis Eckersley; 31 Andy Hassler; 26 John LaRose; 37 Bill Lee; 28 Allen Ripley; 47 Bobby Sprowl; 46 Bob Stanley; 23 Luis Tiant; 21 Mike Torrez; 45 Jim Wright	Catchers: 27 Carlton Fisk; 10 Bob Montgomery; Infielders: 30 Bob Bailey; 3 Jack Brohamer; 7 Rick Burleson; 17 Frank Duffy; 4 Butch Hobson; 18 Fred Kendall; 2 Jerry Remy; 15 George Scott	Outfielders: 29 Sam Bowen; 1 Bernie Carbo; 24 Dwight Evans; 38 Garry Hancock; 19 Fred Lynn; 14 Jim Rice; 8 Carl Yastrzemski	Manager: 34 Don Zimmer; Coaches: 33 Walt Hriniak (Bullpen); 32 Al Jackson (Pitching); 35 Johnny Pesky (First base); 36 Eddie Yost (Third base)

=== Game log ===
1978 Boston Red Sox Season Game Log: 99–64 (Home: 59–23; Away: 40–41)
April: 11–9 (Home: 8–2; Away: 3–7)

#	Date	Opponent	Score	Win	Loss	Save	Stadium	Attendance	Record
1	April 7	@ White Sox	5–6	LaGrow (1–0)	Drago (0–1)		Comiskey Park	50,754	0–1
2	April 8	@ White Sox	5–6	Torrealba (1–0)	Campbell (0–1)	LaGrow (1)	Comiskey Park	11,832	0–2
3	April 9	@ White Sox	5–0	Lee (1–0)	Wood (0–1)		Comiskey Park	30,794	1–2
4	April 10	@ Indians	4–5	Kern (1–0)	Cleveland (0–1)		Cleveland Stadium	4,177	1–3
5	April 12	@ Indians	6–3	Torrez (1–0)	Garland (1–1)	Drago (1)	Cleveland Stadium	6,234	2–3
6	April 14	Rangers	5–4 (10)	Drago (1–1)	Barker (0–1)		Fenway Park	34,747	3–3
7	April 15	Rangers	12–4	Lee (2–0)	D. Ellis (1–1)		Fenway Park	18,624	4–3
8	April 16	Rangers	8–6	Stanley (1–0)	Umbarger (0–1)	Burgmeier (1)	Fenway Park	22,168	5–3
9	April 17	Brewers	9–2	Torrez (2–0)	Stein (0–1)		Fenway Park	26,075	6–3
10	April 18	Brewers	7–6	Tiant (1–0)	Rodríguez (0–1)		Fenway Park	18,928	7–3
—	April 20	Brewers	Postponed (rain); Makeup: August 12						
11	April 20	Brewers	10–4	Lee (3–0)	Haas (2–2)		Fenway Park	16,238	8–3
12	April 21	Indians	9–7	Drago (2–1)	Kern (1–1)		Fenway Park	25,401	9–3
13	April 22	Indians	4–13	Wise (1–2)	Ripley (0–1)		Fenway Park	36,005	9–4
14	April 23	Indians	6–3	Campbell (1–1)	Kinney (0–1)		Fenway Park	–	10–4
15	April 23	Indians	7–10 (11)	Kern (2–1)	Stanley (1–1)	Kinney (1)	Fenway Park	36,246	10–5
16	April 25	@ Brewers	4–3	Lee (4–0)	Augustine (3–2)	Drago (2)	County Stadium	9,051	11–5
17	April 26	@ Brewers	4–6	Caldwell (1–0)	Torrez (2–1)	McClure (2)	County Stadium	8,724	11–6
18	April 28	@ Rangers	4–5 (11)	Cleveland (1–2)	Campbell (1–2)		Arlington Stadium	29,731	11–7
19	April 29	@ Rangers	1–4	D. Ellis (2–1)	Eckersley (0–1)		Arlington Stadium	34,101	11–8
20	April 30	@ Rangers	1–2	Jenkins (1–2)	Campbell (1–3)		Arlington Stadium	22,554	11–9

May: 23–7 (Home: 14–2; Away: 9–5)

#	Date	Opponent	Score	Win	Loss	Save	Stadium	Attendance	Record
21	May 1	Orioles	9–6	Torrez (3–1)	Briles (1–2)	Stanley (1)	Fenway Park	18,710	12–9
22	May 2	Orioles	1–3	D. Martínez (3–1)	Ripley (0–2)		Fenway Park	19,930	12–10
23	May 3	Twins	11–9	Burgmeier (1–0)	D. Johnson (0–2)	Stanley (2)	Fenway Park	16,403	13–10
24	May 4	Twins	8–1	Eckersley (1–1)	Thormodsgard (1–3)		Fenway Park	15,784	14–10
—	May 5	White Sox	Postponed (rain); Makeup: May 6						
25	May 6	White Sox	6–4 (10)	Stanley (2–1)	Willoughby (0–2)		Fenway Park	–	15–10
26	May 6	White Sox	3–0	Wright (1–0)	Barrios (0–2)		Fenway Park	32,238	16–10
27	May 7	White Sox	5–0	Torrez (4–1)	Torrealba (1–4)		Fenway Park	30,921	17–10
28	May 8	Royals	8–4	Stanley (3–1)	Leonard (3–5)		Fenway Park	25,891	18–10
29	May 9	Royals	4–3	Eckersley (2–1)	Colborn (1–2)		Fenway Park	22,369	19–10
30	May 10	@ Orioles	2–3	Flanagan (3–3)	Burgmeier (1–1)		Memorial Stadium	10,023	19–11
31	May 11	@ Orioles	5–4	Lee (5–0)	D. Martínez (3–2)	Drago (3)	Memorial Stadium	14,950	20–11
—	May 12	@ Twins	Postponed (rain); Makeup: July 24						
32	May 13	@ Twins	4–2	Torrez (5–1)	Zahn (2–2)	Burgmeier (2)	Metropolitan Stadium	7,914	21–11
33	May 14	@ Twins	6–2	Eckersley (3–1)	Thormodsgard (1–5)	Burgmeier (3)	Metropolitan Stadium	7,008	22–11
34	May 15	@ Royals	1–3	Gale (3–0)	Ripley (0–3)		Royals Stadium	34,166	22–12
35	May 16	@ Royals	3–2	Lee (6–0)	Splittorff (4–3)		Royals Stadium	23,474	23–12
36	May 19	@ Tigers	5–7	Sykes (3–0)	Torrez (5–2)	Hiller (4)	Tiger Stadium	48,817	23–13
37	May 20	@ Tigers	6–5	Campbell (2–3)	Foucault (1–4)		Tiger Stadium	30,856	24–13
38	May 21	@ Tigers	1–2	Wilcox (3–1)	Lee (6–1)		Tiger Stadium	–	24–14
39	May 21	@ Tigers	9–3	Tiant (2–0)	Rozema (2–2)		Tiger Stadium	52,368	25–14
40	May 22	@ Blue Jays	5–4	Ripley (1–3)	Clancy (2–4)	Stanley (3)	Exhibition Stadium	25,054	26–14
41	May 23	@ Blue Jays	1–2 (12)	Jefferson (3–5)	Campbell (2–4)		Exhibition Stadium	14,578	26–15
42	May 24	@ Blue Jays	8–2	Torrez (6–2)	Lemanczyk (1–8)		Exhibition Stadium	28,825	27–15
43	May 25	@ Blue Jays	9–5	Eckersley (4–1)	Underwood (1–5)	Drago (4)	Exhibition Stadium	17,197	28–15
44	May 26	Tigers	6–3	Lee (7–1)	Wilcox (3–2)		Fenway Park	33,431	29–15
45	May 27	Tigers	1–0	Tiant (3–0)	Morris (0–1)		Fenway Park	33,335	30–15
46	May 28	Tigers	4–3 (10)	Stanley (4–1)	Hiller (4–3)		Fenway Park	–	31–15
47	May 28	Tigers	4–3	Wright (2–0)	Slaton (4–2)	Drago (5)	Fenway Park	34,672	32–15
48	May 29	Blue Jays	5–4	Torrez (7–2)	Underwood (1–6)		Fenway Park	25,935	33–15
49	May 30	Blue Jays	4–0	Eckersley (5–1)	Garvin (2–4)		Fenway Park	25,853	34–15
50	May 31	Blue Jays	2–6	Clancy (4–4)	Lee (7–2)		Fenway Park	27,945	34–16

June: 18–7 (Home: 11–2; Away: 7–5)

#	Date	Opponent	Score	Win	Loss	Save	Stadium	Attendance	Record
51	June 2	@ Angels	6–1	Tiant (4–0)	Ryan (3–5)	Drago (6)	Anaheim Stadium	31,324	35–16
52	June 3	@ Angels	5–4	Torrez (8–2)	Hartzell (1–4)	Campbell (1)	Anaheim Stadium	34,228	36–16
53	June 4	@ Angels	2–4	Tanana (9–2)	Eckersley (5–2)	LaRoche (7)	Anaheim Stadium	29,911	36–17
54	June 5	@ Athletics	7–9	Broberg (6–4)	Ripley (1–4)	Sosa (8)	Oakland Coliseum	36,463	36–18
55	June 6	@ Athletics	1–7	Renko (1–1)	Lee (7–3)		Oakland Coliseum	7,914	36–19
56	June 9	@ Mariners	3–2	Tiant (5–0)	Mitchell (2–6)		Kingdome	11,677	37–19
57	June 10	@ Mariners	13–1	Torrez (9–2)	Pole (4–7)		Kingdome	15,910	38–19
58	June 11	@ Mariners	5–3	Eckersley (6–2)	McLaughlin (0–2)	Campbell (2)	Kingdome	18,626	39–19
59	June 12	Angels	10–9	Campbell (3–4)	LaRoche (5–3)		Fenway Park	31,652	40–19
60	June 13	Angels	5–0	Wright (3–0)	Knapp (6–5)		Fenway Park	26,539	41–19
61	June 14	Athletics	9–0	Tiant (6–0)	Broberg (6–6)		Fenway Park	29,690	42–19
62	June 15	Athletics	7–3	Torrez (10–2)	Lacey (5–3)		Fenway Park	32,281	43–19
63	June 16	Mariners	6–3	Campbell (4–4)	Pole (4–8)		Fenway Park	31,519	44–19
64	June 17	Mariners	5–4	Stanley (5–1)	Montague (0–3)		Fenway Park	32,551	45–19
65	June 18	Mariners	2–3	Abbott (2–4)	Wright (3–1)		Fenway Park	28,961	45–20
66	June 19	Yankees	10–4	Burgmeier (2–1)	Gossage (3–7)		Fenway Park	33,163	46–20
67	June 20	Yankees	4–10	Gullett (2–0)	Torrez (10–3)		Fenway Park	32,643	46–21
68	June 21	Yankees	9–2	Eckersley (7–2)	Beattie (2–3)		Fenway Park	32,459	47–21
69	June 23	Orioles	5–2	Lee (8–3)	Palmer (10–5)		Fenway Park	34,582	48–21
70	June 24	Orioles	8–3	Tiant (7–0)	McGregor (8–5)		Fenway Park	32,213	49–21
71	June 25	Orioles	4–1	Torrez (11–3)	D. Martínez (6–5)		Fenway Park	33,526	50–21
72	June 26	@ Yankees	4–1	Eckersley (8–2)	Messersmith (0–2)	Campbell (3)	Yankee Stadium	52,124	51–21
73	June 27	@ Yankees	4–6 (14)	Lyle (6–1)	Drago (2–2)		Yankee Stadium	55,132	51–22
74	June 29	@ Orioles	4–3	Ripley (2–4)	D. Martínez (6–6)		Memorial Stadium	28,899	52–22
75	June 30	@ Orioles	2–3 (11)	Stanhouse (2–5)	Tiant (7–1)		Memorial Stadium	33,034	52–23

July: 13–15 (Home: 7–4; Away: 6–11)

#	Date	Opponent	Score	Win	Loss	Save	Stadium	Attendance	Record
76	July 1	@ Orioles	2–3 (11)	Briles (2–4)	Torrez (11–4)		Memorial Stadium	38,542	52–24
—	July 2	@ Orioles	Postponed (rain); Makeup: September 6						
77	July 3	Yankees	9–5	Eckersley (9–2)	Figueroa (7–6)		Fenway Park	34,722	53–24
—	July 4	Yankees	Postponed (rain); Makeup: September 7						
78	July 5	@ White Sox	9–2	Lee (9–3)	Stone (6–6)	Stanley (4)	Comiskey Park	26,434	54–24
79	July 6	@ White Sox	7–6 (10)	Campbell (5–4)	Willoughby (1–6)		Comiskey Park	29,330	55–24
80	July 7	@ Indians	9–10	Spillner (2–0)	Campbell (5–5)		Cleveland Stadium	19,543	55–25
81	July 8	@ Indians	12–5	Eckersley (10–2)	Paxton (6–5)		Cleveland Stadium	–	56–25
82	July 8	@ Indians	3–2	Wright (4–1)	Clyde (4–5)	Stanley (5)	Cleveland Stadium	41,859	57–25
83	July 9	@ Indians	1–7	Wise (7–11)	Ripley (2–5)		Cleveland Stadium	41,394	57–26
ASG	July 11	All-Star Game	AL 3–7 NL	Sutter (1–0)	Gossage (0–1)		San Diego Stadium	51,549	
84	July 13	Rangers	7–12	D. Ellis (8–4)	Tiant (7–2)		Fenway Park	33,995	57–27
85	July 14	Rangers	3–4	Jenkins (9–4)	Torrez (11–5)	Cleveland (9)	Fenway Park	32,899	57–28
86	July 15	Twins	5–4	Lee (10–3)	Jackson (2–2)	Stanley (6)	Fenway Park	32,861	58–28
87	July 16	Twins	5–3	Eckersley (11–2)	Harrison (0–1)	Campbell (4)	Fenway Park	–	59–28
88	July 16	Twins	3–2	Wright (5–1)	Erickson (9–6)	Stanley (7)	Fenway Park	35,589	60–28
89	July 17	Twins	3–2 (10)	Campbell (6–5)	Marshall (4–7)		Fenway Park	33,233	61–28
90	July 19	@ Brewers	8–2	Torrez (12–5)	Sorensen (12–6)		County Stadium	45,332	62–28
91	July 20	@ Brewers	6–8	Rodríguez (2–3)	Lee (10–4)	McClure (5)	County Stadium	35,044	62–29
92	July 21	@ Royals	0–9	Splittorff (11–8)	Eckersley (11–3)		Royals Stadium	39,841	62–30
93	July 22	@ Royals	5–6 (10)	Hrabosky (4–3)	Drago (2–3)		Royals Stadium	37,538	62–31
94	July 23	@ Royals	3–7	Pattin (2–2)	Wright (5–2)		Royals Stadium	39,425	62–32
95	July 24	@ Twins	4–5	Jackson (3–3)	Drago (2–4)	Marshall (12)	Metropolitan Stadium	–	62–33
96	July 24	@ Twins	4–2	Hassler (2–4)	Zahn (8–9)	Stanley (8)	Metropolitan Stadium	21,580	63–33
97	July 25	@ Twins	2–5	Erickson (10–6)	Lee (10–5)	Marshall (13)	Metropolitan Stadium	18,608	63–34
98	July 26	@ Rangers	0–2	Medich (5–5)	Eckersley (11–4)		Arlington Stadium	21,671	63–35
99	July 27	@ Rangers	1–3	Matlack (8–8)	Tiant (7–3)		Arlington Stadium	29,684	63–36
100	July 28	Royals	0–4	Gale (12–3)	Torrez (12–6)		Fenway Park	35,348	63–37
101	July 29	Royals	1–0	Wright (6–2)	Leonard (12–12)		Fenway Park	35,098	64–37
102	July 30	Royals	1–2	Splittorff (12–9)	Lee (10–6)	Hrabosky (14)	Fenway Park	34,626	64–38
103	July 31	White Sox	9–2	Eckersley (12–4)	Kravec (7–10)		Fenway Park	28,858	65–38

August: 19–10 (Home: 11–5; Away: 8–5)

#	Date	Opponent	Score	Win	Loss	Save	Stadium	Attendance	Record
104	August 1	White Sox	2–5	Proly (2–0)	Tiant (7–4)		Fenway Park	30,020	65–39
105	August 2	@ Yankees	7–5 (17)	Stanley (6–1)	Clay (2–4)		Yankee Stadium	52,701	66–39
106	August 3	@ Yankees	8–1 (7)	Torrez (13–6)	Beattie (2–6)		Yankee Stadium	53,379	67–39
107	August 4	@ Brewers	2–6	Sorensen (13–8)	Lee (10–7)		County Stadium	52,562	67–40
108	August 5	@ Brewers	8–1	Eckersley (13–4)	Rodríguez (2–5)		County Stadium	52,968	68–40
109	August 6	@ Brewers	4–0	Tiant (8–4)	Travers (7–6)		County Stadium	48,444	69–40
110	August 8	Indians	9–7	Stanley (7–1)	Freisleben (1–3)		Fenway Park	34,485	70–40
111	August 9	Indians	1–5	Wise (9–14)	Lee (10–8)	Kern (9)	Fenway Park	33,285	70–41
112	August 10	Indians	6–5 (13)	Stanley (8–1)	Spillner (2–1)		Fenway Park	33,541	71–41
113	August 11	Brewers	5–10	Rodríguez (3–5)	Tiant (8–5)		Fenway Park	35,142	71–42
114	August 12	Brewers	3–1	Wright (7–2)	Travers (7–7)		Fenway Park	33,092	72–42
115	August 12	Brewers	11–4	Stanley (9–1)	Caldwell (14–7)		Fenway Park	27,030	73–42
116	August 13	Brewers	4–3 (10)	Torrez (14–6)	Castro (3–4)		Fenway Park	34,460	74–42
117	August 14	Brewers	3–4	Sorensen (14–8)	Lee (10–9)	McClure (7)	Fenway Park	33,766	74–43
118	August 15	@ Angels	2–5	Tanana (16–7)	Eckersley (13–5)		Anaheim Stadium	41,144	74–44
119	August 16	@ Angels	4–2	Tiant (9–5)	Ryan (6–11)		Anaheim Stadium	37,535	75–44
120	August 17	@ Angels	8–6	Stanley (10–1)	Griffin (2–4)		Anaheim Stadium	30,486	76–44
121	August 18	@ Athletics	6–3	Torrez (15–6)	Renko (6–8)	Drago (7)	Oakland Coliseum	12,730	77–44
122	August 19	@ Athletics	4–8	Johnson (10–6)	Lee (10–10)	Lacey (5)	Oakland Coliseum	11,806	77–45
123	August 20	@ Athletics	4–2	Eckersley (14–5)	Keough (7–11)		Oakland Coliseum	13,411	78–45
124	August 22	@ Mariners	2–5	Abbott (6–10)	Tiant (9–6)		Kingdome	21,486	78–46
125	August 23	@ Mariners	3–5	McLaughlin (2–4)	Torrez (15–7)	Romo (10)	Kingdome	22,718	78–47
126	August 25	Angels	6–0	Eckersley (15–5)	Aase (8–8)		Fenway Park	33,583	79–47
127	August 26	Angels	7–1	Wright (8–2)	Hartzell (5–8)		Fenway Park	33,531	80–47
128	August 27	Angels	4–3 (12)	Stanley (11–1)	D. Miller (4–1)		Fenway Park	34,216	81–47
129	August 28	Mariners	10–9	Stanley (12–1)	Romo (10–6)		Fenway Park	24,301	82–47
130	August 29	Mariners	10–5	Drago (3–1)	McLaughlin (2–5)	Burgmeier (4)	Fenway Park	32,393	83–47
131	August 30	Blue Jays	2–1	Eckersley (16–5)	Kirkwood (3–2)		Fenway Park	–	84–47
132	August 30	Blue Jays	6–7	Cruz (6–1)	Stanley (12–2)		Fenway Park	32,825	84–48

September: 14–15 (Home: 7–7; Away: 7–8)

#	Date	Opponent	Score	Win	Loss	Save	Stadium	Attendance	Record
133	September 1	Athletics	1–5	Keough (8–11)	Tiant (9–7)		Fenway Park	30,156	84–49
134	September 2	Athletics	3–4	Langford (7–10)	Torrez (15–8)	Heaverlo (10)	Fenway Park	33,051	84–50
135	September 3	Athletics	11–6	Stanley (13–2)	Broberg (9–11)		Fenway Park	29,029	85–50
136	September 4	@ Orioles	3–5	McGregor (13–12)	Eckersley (16–6)	Stanhouse (20)	Memorial Stadium	17,967	85–51
137	September 5	@ Orioles	1–4	Palmer (18–12)	Sprowl (0–1)	Stanhouse (21)	Memorial Stadium	15,644	85–52
138	September 6	@ Orioles	2–0	Tiant (10–7)	D. Martínez (12–11)		Memorial Stadium	11,251	86–52
139	September 7	Yankees	3–15	Clay (3–4)	Torrez (15–9)		Fenway Park	34,119	86–53
140	September 8	Yankees	2–13	Beattie (4–7)	Wright (8–3)		Fenway Park	33,134	86–54
141	September 9	Yankees	0–7	Guidry (21–2)	Eckersley (16–7)		Fenway Park	33,611	86–55
142	September 10	Yankees	4–7	Figueroa (16–9)	Sprowl (0–2)	Gossage (23)	Fenway Park	32,786	86–56
143	September 11	Orioles	5–4	Stanley (14–2)	Kerrigan (3–1)		Fenway Park	28,575	87–56
144	September 12	Orioles	2–3	D. Martínez (13–11)	Torrez (15–10)		Fenway Park	28,924	87–57
145	September 13	@ Indians	1–2	Clyde (7–10)	Eckersley (16–8)	Kern (12)	Cleveland Stadium	5,568	87–58
146	September 14	@ Indians	3–4	Paxton (11–9)	Wright (8–4)	Kern (13)	Cleveland Stadium	4,479	87–59
147	September 15	@ Yankees	0–4	Guidry (22–2)	Tiant (10–8)		Yankee Stadium	54,901	87–60
148	September 16	@ Yankees	2–3	Hunter (10–5)	Torrez (15–11)		Yankee Stadium	55,091	87–61
149	September 17	@ Yankees	7–3	Eckersley (17–8)	Beattie (5–8)	Stanley (9)	Yankee Stadium	55,088	88–61
150	September 18	@ Tigers	5–4 (11)	Hassler (3–4)	Baker (1–3)		Tiger Stadium	13,849	89–61
151	September 19	@ Tigers	8–6	Campbell (7–5)	Morris (3–5)	Hassler (1)	Tiger Stadium	15,901	90–61
152	September 20	@ Tigers	2–12	Rozema (9–10)	Torrez (15–12)		Tiger Stadium	16,689	90–62
153	September 21	@ Tigers	5–1	Eckersley (18–8)	Wilcox (13–11)		Tiger Stadium	15,213	91–62
154	September 22	@ Blue Jays	4–5	Murphy (6–9)	Hassler (3–5)		Exhibition Stadium	22,172	91–63
155	September 23	@ Blue Jays	3–1	Tiant (11–8)	Jefferson (7–15)		Exhibition Stadium	30,059	92–63
156	September 24	@ Blue Jays	7–6 (14)	Drago (4–4)	Buskey (0–1)		Exhibition Stadium	33,618	93–63
157	September 26	Tigers	6–0	Eckersley (19–8)	Rozema (9–11)		Fenway Park	27,078	94–63
158	September 27	Tigers	5–2	Tiant (12–8)	Wilcox (13–12)	Stanley (10)	Fenway Park	26,035	95–63
159	September 28	Tigers	1–0	Torrez (16–12)	Young (6–7)		Fenway Park	26,774	96–63
160	September 29	Blue Jays	11–0	Stanley (15–2)	Clancy (10–12)		Fenway Park	29,626	97–63
161	September 30	Blue Jays	5–1	Eckersley (20–8)	Jefferson (7–16)		Fenway Park	32,659	98–63

October: 1–1 (Home: 1–1; Away: 0–0)

#	Date	Opponent	Score	Win	Loss	Save	Stadium	Attendance	Record
162	October 1	Blue Jays	5–0	Tiant (13–8)	Kirkwood (4–5)		Fenway Park	29,201	99–63
163	October 2	Yankees	4–5	Guidry (25–3)	Torrez (16–13)	Gossage (27)	Fenway Park	32,925	99–64

== Player stats ==
=== Batting ===
==== Starters by position ====
Note: Pos = Position; G = Games played; AB = At bats; R = Runs scored; H = Hits; Avg. = Batting average; HR = Home runs; RBI = Runs batted in; SB = Stolen bases

= Indicates team leader

= Indicates league leader

Pos	Player	G	AB	R	H	Avg.	HR	RBI	SB
C	Carlton Fisk	157	571	94	162	.284	20	88	7
1B	George Scott	120	412	51	96	.233	12	54	1
2B	Jerry Remy	148	583	87	162	.278	2	44	30
3B	Butch Hobson	147	512	65	128	.250	17	80	1
SS	Rick Burleson	145	626	75	155	.248	5	49	8
LF	Jim Rice	163	677	121	213	.315	46	139	7
CF	Fred Lynn	150	541	75	161	.298	22	82	3
RF	Dwight Evans	147	497	75	123	.247	24	63	8
DH	Bob Bailey	43	94	12	18	.191	4	9	2

==== Other batters ====
Note: G = Games played; AB = At bats; R = Runs scored; H = Hits; Avg. = Batting average; HR = Home runs; RBI = Runs batted in; SB = Stolen bases

Player	G	AB	R	H	Avg.	HR	RBI	SB
Carl Yastrzemski	144	523	70	145	.277	17	81	4
Jack Brohamer	81	244	34	57	.234	1	25	1
Frank Duffy	64	104	12	27	.260	0	4	1
Garry Hancock	38	80	10	18	.225	0	4	0
Bernie Carbo	17	46	7	12	.261	1	6	1
Fred Kendall	20	41	3	8	.195	0	4	0
Bob Montgomery	10	29	2	7	.241	0	5	0
Sam Bowen	6	7	3	1	.143	1	1	0

=== Pitching ===
==== Starting pitchers ====
Note: G = Games pitched; CG = Complete games; IP = Innings pitched; W = Wins; L = Losses; ERA = Earned run average; BB = Walks allowed; SO = Strikeouts

Player	G	CG	IP	W	L	ERA	BB	SO
Dennis Eckersley	35	16	268.1	20	8	2.99	71	162
Mike Torrez	36	15	250.0	16	13	3.96	99	120
Luis Tiant	32	12	212.1	13	8	3.31	57	114
Bill Lee	28	8	177.0	10	10	3.46	59	44
Allen Ripley	15	1	73.0	2	5	5.55	22	26
Bobby Sprowl	3	0	12.2	0	2	6.39	10	10

==== Other pitchers ====
Note: G = Games pitched; IP = Innings pitched; W = Wins; L = Losses; ERA = Earned run average; BB = Walks allowed; SO = Strikeouts

Player	G	IP	W	L	ERA	BB	SO
Jim Wright	24	116.0	8	4	3.57	24	56
Andy Hassler	13	30.0	2	1	3.00	13	23

==== Relief pitchers ====
Note: G = Games pitched; W = Wins; L = Losses; SV = Saves; ERA = Earned run average; SO = Strikeouts

Player	G	W	L	SV	ERA	SO
Bob Stanley	52	15	2	10	2.60	38
Dick Drago	37	4	4	7	3.03	42
Tom Burgmeier	35	2	1	4	4.40	24
Bill Campbell	29	7	5	4	3.91	47
John LaRose	1	0	0	0	22.50	3
Reggie Cleveland	1	0	1	0	0.00	0

== AL East tie-breaker game ==
October 2, 1978 at Fenway Park, Boston, Massachusetts
Team	1	2	3	4	5	6	7	8	9	R	H	E
New York Yankees	0	0	0	0	0	0	4	1	0	5	8	0
Boston Red Sox	0	1	0	0	1	0	0	2	0	4	11	0
WP: Ron Guidry (25-3) LP: Mike Torrez (16-13) Sv: Goose Gossage (27); Home runs: NYY: Bucky Dent, Reggie Jackson; BOS: Carl Yastrzemski

== Awards and honors ==
Awards

- Dwight Evans – Gold Glove Award (OF)
- Fred Lynn – Gold Glove Award (OF)
- Jim Rice – American League Most Valuable Player, AL Player of the Month (May, August)

Accomplishments

- Jim Rice, American League leader, Hits (213)
- Jim Rice, American League leader, Home runs (46)
- Jim Rice, American League leader, RBIs (139)

All-Star Game

- Rick Burleson, reserve SS (did not attend)
- Dwight Evans, reserve OF
- Carlton Fisk, starting C
- Fred Lynn, reserve OF (started CF)
- Jerry Remy, reserve 2B
- Jim Rice, starting LF
- Carl Yastrzemski, reserve OF (did not attend)

== Farm system ==
Level	Team	League	Manager
AAA	Pawtucket Red Sox	International League	Joe Morgan
AA	Bristol Red Sox	Eastern League	Tony Torchia
A	Winston-Salem Red Sox	Carolina League	Bill Slack
A	Winter Haven Red Sox	Florida State League	Rac Slider
A-Short Season	Elmira Red Sox	New York–Penn League	Dick Berardino

LEAGUE CHAMPIONS: Bristol
