= 1979 Boston Red Sox season =

Major League Baseball season

1979 Boston Red Sox
- League: American League
- Division: East
- Ballpark: Fenway Park
- City: Boston, Massachusetts
- Record: 91–69 (.569)
- Divisional place: 3rd
- Owners: Buddy LeRoux, Haywood Sullivan, Jean Yawkey
- President: Jean Yawkey
- General manager: Haywood Sullivan
- Manager: Don Zimmer
- Television: WSBK-TV, Ch. 38 (Ned Martin, Ken Harrelson)
- Radio: WITS-AM 1510 (Ken Coleman, Rico Petrocelli)
- Stats: ESPN.com; Baseball Reference

The 1979 Boston Red Sox season was the 79th season in the franchise's Major League Baseball history. The Red Sox finished third in the American League East with a record of 91 wins and 69 losses, 11 1/2 games behind the Baltimore Orioles, who went on to win the AL championship.

== Offseason ==
On December 7, 1978, pitcher Bill Lee was traded to the Montreal Expos for infielder Stan Papi.

== Regular season ==
Record by month
Month	Record		Cumulative		AL East		Ref.
Month	Won	Lost	Won	Lost	Position	GB	Ref.
April	13	7	13	7	1st	+1/2	
May	14	12	27	19	2nd	2	
June	20	8	47	27	2nd	4 1/2	
July	15	13	62	40	2nd	7 1/2	
August	16	13	78	53	3rd	8 1/2	
September	13	16	91	69	3rd	11 1/2	

The Red Sox only played 160 games, as a home game scheduled against the Milwaukee Brewers on August 12, and an away game scheduled against the Chicago White Sox on August 29, were rained out and not rescheduled.

=== Highlights ===
Fred Lynn had a league-leading .333 batting average and had 39 home runs and 122 RBIs, while Jim Rice batted .325 with 39 homers and 130 RBIs. On the pitching staff, Dennis Eckersley was 17–10, down from 20–8 the prior season, and Mike Torrez was 16–13, matching his record of the previous year.

The season also featured Carl Yastrzemski's 3,000th hit and his 400th home run. His 400th home run came off of Mike Morgan of the Athletics on July 24. Yaz became the seventh AL player and 18th MLB player to collect 400 home runs. He joined the 3,000 hit club with a single off of Jim Beattie of the Yankees on September 12. Yaz was the 15th player to collect 3,000 major league hits, and the first AL player to have both 3,000 hits and 400 home runs.

New acquisition Bob Watson hit for the cycle on September 15 to lead a 10–2 win over the Baltimore Orioles. This event distinguished Watson as the first player to hit for the cycle as a member of both of an American League and a National League team. As a member of the Houston Astros on June 24, 1977, he had hit his first cycle with 5 runs batted in (RBI) in a 6–5 win over the San Francisco Giants.

=== Season standings ===
AL East
Team	W	L	Pct.	GB	Home	Road
Baltimore Orioles	102	57	.642	—	55‍–‍24	47‍–‍33
Milwaukee Brewers	95	66	.590	8	52‍–‍29	43‍–‍37
Boston Red Sox	91	69	.569	11½	51‍–‍29	40‍–‍40
New York Yankees	89	71	.556	13½	51‍–‍30	38‍–‍41
Detroit Tigers	85	76	.528	18	46‍–‍34	39‍–‍42
Cleveland Indians	81	80	.503	22	47‍–‍34	34‍–‍46
Toronto Blue Jays	53	109	.327	50½	32‍–‍49	21‍–‍60

=== Record vs. opponents ===
1979 American League record Sources:
Team	BAL	BOS	CAL	CWS	CLE	DET	KC	MIL	MIN	NYY	OAK	SEA	TEX	TOR
Baltimore	—	8–5	9–3	8–3	8–5	7–6	6–6	8–5	8–4	5–6	8–4	10–2	6–6	11–2
Boston	5–8	—	5–7	5–6	6–7	8–5	8–4	8–4	9–3	5–8	9–3	8–4	6–6	9–4
California	3–9	7–5	—	9–4	6–6	4–8	7–6	7–5	9–4	7–5	10–3	7–6	5–8	7–5
Chicago	3–8	6–5	4–9	—	6–6	3–9	5–8	5–7	5–8	4–8	9–4	5–8	11–2	7–5
Cleveland	5–8	7–6	6–6	6–6	—	6–6	6–6	4–9	8–4	5–8	8–4	7–5	5–7	8–5
Detroit	6–7	5–8	8–4	9–3	6–6	—	5–7	6–7	4–8	7–6	7–5	7–5	6–6	9–4
Kansas City	6–6	4–8	6–7	8–5	6–6	7–5	—	5–7	7–6	5–7	9–4	7–6	6–7	9–3
Milwaukee	5–8	4–8	5–7	7–5	9–4	7–6	7–5	—	8–4	9–4	6–6	9–3	9–3	10–3
Minnesota	4–8	3–9	4–9	8–5	4–8	8–4	6–7	4–8	—	7–5	9–4	10–3	4–9	11–1
New York	6–5	8–5	5–7	8–4	8–5	6–7	7–5	4–9	5–7	—	9–3	6–6	8–4	9–4
Oakland	4–8	3–9	3–10	4–9	4–8	5–7	4–9	6–6	4–9	3–9	—	8–5	2–11	4–8
Seattle	2–10	4–8	6–7	8–5	5–7	5–7	6–7	3–9	3–10	6–6	5–8	—	6–7	8–4
Texas	6–6	6–6	8–5	2–11	7–5	6–6	7–6	3–9	9–4	4–8	11–2	7–6	—	7–5
Toronto	2–11	4–9	5–7	5–7	5–8	4–9	3–9	3–10	1–11	4–9	8–4	4–8	5–7	—

=== Notable transactions ===
- June 13, 1979: Pete Ladd, a player to be named later, and cash were traded by the Red Sox to the Houston Astros for Bob Watson. The Red Sox completed the deal by sending Bobby Sprowl to the Astros on June 19.
- August 17, 1979: The Red Sox traded a player to be named later and cash to the Chicago Cubs for Ted Sizemore. The Red Sox completed the deal by sending Mike O'Berry to the Cubs on October 23.

=== Opening Day lineup ===
2	Jerry Remy	2B
7	Rick Burleson	SS
19	Fred Lynn	CF
14	Jim Rice	DH
8	Carl Yastrzemski	LF
15	George Scott	1B
3	Jack Brohamer	3B
24	Dwight Evans	RF
10	Bob Montgomery	C
43	Dennis Eckersley	P

=== Roster ===
1979 Boston Red Sox
Roster
Pitchers: 16 Tom Burgmeier; 22 Bill Campbell; 41 Dick Drago; 43 Dennis Eckersley; 44 Joel Finch; 31 Andy Hassler; 42 Chuck Rainey; 49 Win Remmerswaal; 25 Steve Renko; 28 Allen Ripley; 46 Bob Stanley; 21 Mike Torrez; 30 John Tudor; 45 Jim Wright	Catchers: 39 Gary Allenson; 27 Carlton Fisk; 10 Bob Montgomery; 50 Mike O'Berry; Infielders: 3 Jack Brohamer; 7 Rick Burleson; 17 Frank Duffy; 1 Jim Dwyer; 4 Butch Hobson; 12 Stan Papi; 2 Jerry Remy; 5 George Scott; 11 Ted Sizemore; 5 Bob Watson; 20 Larry Wolfe; 8 Carl Yastrzemski	Outfielders: 24 Dwight Evans; 19 Fred Lynn; 17 Tom Poquette; 14 Jim Rice	Manager: 34 Don Zimmer; Coaches: 33 Walt Hriniak (Bullpen); 32 Al Jackson (Pitching); 35 Johnny Pesky (First base); 36 Eddie Yost (Third base)

== Player stats ==
= Indicates team leader

= Indicates league leader

=== Batting ===
==== Starters by position ====
Note: Pos = Position; G = Games played; AB = At bats; H = Hits; Avg. = Batting average; HR = Home runs; RBI = Runs batted in

Pos	Player	G	AB	H	Avg.	HR	RBI
C	Gary Allenson	108	241	49	.203	3	22
1B	Bob Watson	84	312	105	.337	13	53
2B	Jerry Remy	80	306	91	.297	0	29
SS	Rick Burleson	153	627	174	.278	5	60
3B	Butch Hobson	146	528	138	.261	28	93
LF	Jim Rice	158	619	201	.325	39	130
CF	Fred Lynn	147	531	177	.333	39	122
RF	Dwight Evans	152	489	134	.274	21	58
DH	Carl Yastrzemski	147	518	140	.270	21	87

==== Other batters ====
Note: G = Games played; AB = At bats; H = Hits; Avg. = Batting average; HR = Home runs; RBI = Runs batted in

Player	G	AB	H	Avg.	HR	RBI
Carlton Fisk	91	320	87	.272	10	42
Jack Brohamer	64	192	51	.266	1	11
George Scott	45	156	35	.224	4	23
Tom Poquette	63	154	51	.331	2	23
Stan Papi	50	117	22	.188	1	6
Jim Dwyer	76	113	30	.265	2	14
Ted Sizemore	26	88	23	.261	1	6
Bob Montgomery	32	86	30	.349	0	7
Larry Wolfe	47	78	19	.244	3	15
Mike O'Berry	43	59	10	.169	1	4
Frank Duffy	6	3	0	.000	0	0

=== Pitching ===
==== Starting pitchers ====
Note: G = Games pitched; IP = Innings pitched; W = Wins; L = Losses; ERA = Earned run average; SO = Strikeouts

Player	G	IP	W	L	ERA	SO
Mike Torrez	36	252.1	16	13	4.49	125
Dennis Eckersley	33	246.2	17	10	2.99	150
Bob Stanley	40	216.2	16	12	3.99	56
Steve Renko	27	171.0	11	9	4.11	99
Chuck Rainey	20	103.2	8	5	3.82	41
John Tudor	6	28.0	1	2	6.43	11

==== Other pitchers ====
Note: G = Games pitched; IP = Innings pitched; W = Wins; L = Losses; ERA = Earned run average; SO = Strikeouts

Player	G	IP	W	L	ERA	SO
Allen Ripley	16	64.2	3	1	5.15	34
Joel Finch	15	57.1	0	3	4.87	25

==== Relief pitchers ====
Note: G = Games pitched; W = Wins; L = Losses; SV = Saves; ERA = Earned run average; SO = Strikeouts

Player	G	W	L	SV	ERA	SO
Dick Drago	56	10	3	13	3.03	67
Tom Burgmeier	44	3	2	4	2.74	60
Bill Campbell	41	3	4	9	4.28	25
Jim Wright	11	1	0	0	5.09	15
Win Remmerswaal	8	1	0	0	7.08	16
Andy Hassler	8	1	2	0	8.80	7

== Awards and honors ==
Awards

- Rick Burleson – Gold Glove Award (SS)
- Dwight Evans – Gold Glove Award (OF)
- Fred Lynn – Gold Glove Award (OF), AL Player of the Month (August)

All-Star Game

- Rick Burleson, reserve SS
- Fred Lynn, starting CF
- Jim Rice, starting RF
- Bob Stanley, reserve P
- Carl Yastrzemski, starting 1B

Offensive achievements

- Hitting for the cycle: Bob Watson, September 15, 1979

== Farm system ==
Level	Team	League	Manager
AAA	Pawtucket Red Sox	International League	Joe Morgan
AA	Bristol Red Sox	Eastern League	Tony Torchia
A	Winston-Salem Red Sox	Carolina League	Bill Slack
A	Winter Haven Red Sox	Florida State League	Rac Slider
A-Short Season	Elmira Pioneers	New York–Penn League	Dick Berardino

LEAGUE CHAMPIONS: Winston-Salem, Winter Haven
