= 1977 Boston Red Sox season =

Major League Baseball season

1977 Boston Red Sox
- League: American League
- Division: East
- Ballpark: Fenway Park
- City: Boston, Massachusetts
- Record: 97–64 (.602)
- Divisional place: 2nd
- Owner: Jean Yawkey
- President: Jean Yawkey
- General manager: Dick O'Connell
- Manager: Don Zimmer
- Television: WSBK-TV, Ch. 38 (Dick Stockton, Ken Harrelson)
- Radio: WMEX-AM 1510 (Ned Martin, Jim Woods)
- Stats: ESPN.com; Baseball Reference

The 1977 Boston Red Sox season was the 77th season in the franchise's Major League Baseball history. The Red Sox finished tied for second in the American League East with a record of 97 wins and 64 losses, 2 1/2 games behind the New York Yankees.

== Offseason ==
- November 22, 1976: Darryl Cias was signed as a free agent by the Red Sox.
- December 6, 1976: Cecil Cooper is traded by the Red Sox to the Milwaukee Brewers for Bernie Carbo and George Scott.

== Regular season ==
Record by month
Month	Record		Cumulative		AL East		Ref.
Month	Won	Lost	Won	Lost	Position	GB	Ref.
April	9	9	9	9	4th	2 1/2	
May	15	12	24	21	3rd	2 1/2	
June	17	10	41	31	1st	+1/2	
July	17	12	58	43	1st	—	
August	17	12	75	55	2nd (tie)	4	
September	22	8	97	63	2nd	2	
October	0	1	97	64	2nd (tie)	2 1/2	

Boston's final game of the season, scheduled for October 2 at home against the Baltimore Orioles, was rained out and not rescheduled.

=== Highlights ===
Lack of pitching depth might have been a hindrance, but the team was helped by a league-leading offense, which during one ten-game span hit 33 home runs. With that kind of scoring, Boston managed to compete with the Yankees and Orioles—leading the division as late as August 22—but at season's end, not even 97 wins would be enough.

On June 18, during a nationally televised game against the New York Yankees at Fenway Park in Boston, Jim Rice, a powerful hitter but a slow runner, hit a ball into right field. Yankees outfielder Reggie Jackson seemed to approach the ball indifferently, and Rice reached second base. Furious, Yankees manager Billy Martin removed Jackson from the game without even waiting for the end of the inning, sending Paul Blair out to replace him. When Jackson arrived at the dugout, Martin yelled that Jackson had shown him up. They argued, and Jackson said that Martin's heavy drinking had impaired his judgment. Despite Jackson being 18 years younger, about 4 inches (10 cm) taller and maybe 40 pounds (18 kg) heavier, Martin lunged at him, and had to be restrained by coaches Yogi Berra and Elston Howard. Red Sox fans could see this in the dugout and began cheering wildly, and the NBC television cameras showed the confrontation to the entire country. The Red Sox went on to win the game, 10–4.

=== Season standings ===
AL East
Team	W	L	Pct.	GB	Home	Road
New York Yankees	100	62	.617	—	55‍–‍26	45‍–‍36
Baltimore Orioles	97	64	.602	2½	54‍–‍27	43‍–‍37
Boston Red Sox	97	64	.602	2½	51‍–‍29	46‍–‍35
Detroit Tigers	74	88	.457	26	39‍–‍42	35‍–‍46
Cleveland Indians	71	90	.441	28½	37‍–‍44	34‍–‍46
Milwaukee Brewers	67	95	.414	33	37‍–‍44	30‍–‍51
Toronto Blue Jays	54	107	.335	45½	25‍–‍55	29‍–‍52

=== Record vs. opponents ===
1977 American League record Sources:
Team	BAL	BOS	CAL	CWS	CLE	DET	KC	MIL	MIN	NYY	OAK	SEA	TEX	TOR
Baltimore	—	6–8	5–6	5–5	11–4	12–3	4–7	11–4	6–4	8–7	8–2	7–3	4–6	10–5
Boston	8–6	—	7–3	3–7	8–7	9–6	5–5	9–6	4–6	8–7	8–3	10–1	6–4	12–3
California	6–5	3–7	—	8–7	6–4	4–6	6–9	5–5	7–8	4–7	5–10	9–6	5–10	6–4
Chicago	5–5	7–3	7–8	—	6–4	4–6	8–7	6–5	10–5	3–7	10–5	10–5	6–9	8–3
Cleveland	4–11	7–8	4–6	4–6	—	8–7	3–7	11–4	2–9	3–12	7–3	7–3	2–9	9–5
Detroit	3–12	6–9	6–4	6–4	7–8	—	3–8	10–5	5–5	6–9	5–5	5–6	2–8	10–5
Kansas City	7–4	5–5	9–6	7–8	7–3	8–3	—	8–2	10–5	5–5	9–6	11–4	8–7	8–2
Milwaukee	4–11	6–9	5–5	5–6	4–11	5–10	2–8	—	3–8	8–7	5–5	7–3	5–5	8–7
Minnesota	4–6	6–4	8–7	5–10	9–2	5–5	5–10	8–3	—	2–8	8–6	7–8	8–7	9–1
New York	7–8	7–8	7–4	7–3	12–3	9–6	5–5	7–8	8–2	—	9–2	6–4	7–3	9–6
Oakland	2–8	3–8	10–5	5–10	3–7	5–5	6–9	5–5	6–8	2–9	—	7–8	2–13	7–3
Seattle	3–7	1–10	6–9	5–10	3–7	6–5	4–11	3–7	8–7	4–6	8–7	—	9–6	4–6
Texas	6–4	4–6	10–5	9–6	9–2	8–2	7–8	5–5	7–8	3–7	13–2	6–9	—	7–4
Toronto	5–10	3–12	4–6	3–8	5–9	5–10	2–8	7–8	1–9	6–9	3–7	6–4	4–7	—

=== Notable transactions ===
- April 5, 1977: Darryl Cias was released by the Red Sox.
- May 28, 1977: Bobby Darwin was traded by the Red Sox to the Chicago Cubs for Ramón Hernández.
- June 7, 1977: Pete Ladd was drafted by the Red Sox in the 25th round of the 1977 Major League Baseball draft.
- August 20, 1977: Ramón Hernández was released by the Red Sox.

=== Opening Day lineup ===
7	Rick Burleson	SS
5	Denny Doyle	2B
14	Jim Rice	LF
8	Carl Yastrzemski	RF
15	George Scott	1B
1	Bernie Carbo	DH
24	Dwight Evans	CF
27	Carlton Fisk	C
4	Butch Hobson	3B
31	Ferguson Jenkins	P

=== Roster ===
1977 Boston Red Sox
Roster
Pitchers: 45 Don Aase; 43 Jim Burton; 22 Bill Campbell; 26 Reggie Cleveland; 29 Ramón Hernández; 29 Tom House; 31 Ferguson Jenkins; 21 Rick Kreuger; 37 Bill Lee; 47 Tom Murphy; 48 Mike Paxton; 46 Bob Stanley; 23 Luis Tiant; 38 Jim Willoughby; 40 Rick Wise	Catchers: 39 Bo Díaz; 27 Carlton Fisk; 10 Bob Montgomery; Infielders: 11 Ramón Avilés; 41 Jack Baker; 7 Rick Burleson; 3 Steve Dillard; 5 Denny Doyle; 2 Doug Griffin; 12,49 Tommy Helms; 4 Butch Hobson; 15 George Scott	Outfielders: 29 Sam Bowen; 1 Bernie Carbo; 30 Dave Coleman; 42 Bobby Darwin; 24 Dwight Evans; 19 Fred Lynn; 16 Rick Miller; 14 Jim Rice; 8 Carl Yastrzemski; Other batters: 30 Bob Bailey; 18 Ted Cox	Manager: 34 Don Zimmer; Coaches: 33 Walt Hriniak (Bullpen); 32 Al Jackson (Pitching); 35 Johnny Pesky (First base); 36 Eddie Yost (Third base)

== Player stats ==
= Indicates team leader

= Indicates league leader

=== Batting ===
==== Starters by position ====
Note: Pos = Position; G = Games played; AB = At bats; H = Hits; Avg. = Batting average; HR = Home runs; RBI = Runs batted in

Pos	Player	G	AB	H	Avg.	HR	RBI
C	Carlton Fisk	152	536	169	.315	26	102
1B	George Scott	157	584	157	.269	33	95
2B	Denny Doyle	137	455	109	.240	2	49
SS	Rick Burleson	154	663	194	.293	3	52
3B	Butch Hobson	159	593	157	.265	30	112
LF	Carl Yastrzemski	150	558	165	.296	28	102
CF	Fred Lynn	129	497	129	.260	18	76
RF	Bernie Carbo	86	228	66	.289	15	34
DH	Jim Rice	160	644	206	.320	39	114

==== Other batters ====
Note: G = Games played; AB = At bats; H = Hits; Avg. = Batting average; HR = Home runs; RBI = Runs batted in

Player	G	AB	H	Avg.	HR	RBI
Dwight Evans	73	230	66	.287	14	36
Rick Miller	86	189	48	.254	0	24
Steve Dillard	66	141	34	.241	1	13
Tommy Helms	21	59	16	.271	1	5
Ted Cox	13	58	21	.362	1	6
Bob Montgomery	17	40	12	.300	2	7
Dave Coleman	11	12	0	.000	0	0
Bobby Darwin	4	9	2	.222	0	1
Doug Griffin	5	6	0	.000	0	0
Jack Baker	2	3	0	.000	0	0
Bob Bailey	2	2	0	.000	0	0
Sam Bowen	3	2	0	.000	0	0
Bo Diaz	2	1	0	.000	0	0
Ramón Avilés	1	0	0	----	0	0

=== Pitching ===
==== Starting pitchers ====
Note: G = Games pitched; IP = Innings pitched; W = Wins; L = Losses; ERA = Earned run average; SO = Strikeouts

Player	G	IP	W	L	ERA	SO
Ferguson Jenkins	28	193.0	10	10	3.68	105
Reggie Cleveland	36	190.1	11	8	4.26	85
Luis Tiant	32	188.2	12	8	4.53	124
Rick Wise	26	128.1	11	5	4.77	85
Bill Lee	27	128.0	9	5	4.43	31
Don Aase	13	92.1	6	2	3.12	49

==== Other pitchers ====
Note: G = Games pitched; IP = Innings pitched; W = Wins; L = Losses; ERA = Earned run average; SO = Strikeouts

Player	G	IP	W	L	ERA	SO
Bob Stanley	41	151.0	8	7	3.99	44
Mike Paxton	29	108.0	10	5	3.83	58

==== Relief pitchers ====
Note: G = Games pitched; W = Wins; L = Losses; SV = Saves; ERA = Earned run average; SO = Strikeouts

Player	G	W	L	SV	ERA	SO
Bill Campbell	69	13	9	31	2.96	114
Jim Willoughby	31	6	2	2	4.94	33
Tom Murphy	16	0	1	0	6.75	13
Ramón Hernández	12	0	1	1	5.68	8
Tom House	8	1	0	0	12.91	6
Jim Burton	1	0	0	0	0.00	3
Rick Kreuger	1	0	1	0	inf	0

== Awards and honors ==
- Jim Rice – AL Player of the Month (July)
- Carl Yastrzemski, Gold Glove Award (OF)

All-Star Game

- Rick Burleson, starting SS
- Bill Campbell, reserve P
- Carlton Fisk, starting C
- Fred Lynn, reserve OF
- Jim Rice, reserve OF
- George Scott, reserve 1B
- Carl Yastrzemski, starting CF

== Farm system ==
Level	Team	League	Manager
AAA	Pawtucket Red Sox	International League	Joe Morgan
AA	Bristol Red Sox	Eastern League	John Kennedy
A	Winston-Salem Red Sox	Carolina League	Tony Torchia
A	Winter Haven Red Sox	Florida State League	Rac Slider
A-Short Season	Elmira Pioneer-Red Sox	New York–Penn League	Dick Berardino
