= Allen Ripley =

American baseball player (1952–2014)

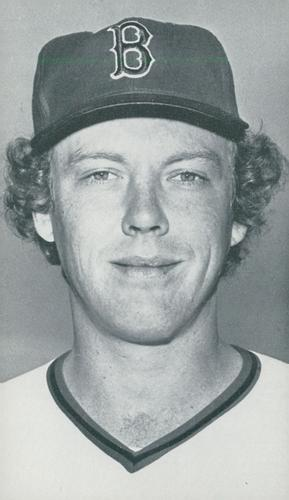
- Pitcher
- Born: October 18, 1952; Norwood, Massachusetts, U.S.
- Died: November 7, 2014 (aged 62); Boston, Massachusetts, U.S.
- Batted: Right Threw: Right

MLB debut
- April 10, 1978, for the Boston Red Sox

Last MLB appearance
- September 14, 1982, for the Chicago Cubs

MLB statistics
- Win–loss record: 23–27
- Earned run average: 4.52
- Strikeouts: 229
- Stats at Baseball Reference

Teams
- Boston Red Sox (1978–1979); San Francisco Giants (1980–1981); Chicago Cubs (1982)

Allen Stevens Ripley (October 18, 1952 – November 7, 2014) was an American pitcher in Major League Baseball who played for three different teams between the 1978 and 1982 seasons. Listed at 6 ft 3 in (1.91 m), 190 pounds (86 kg), Ripley batted and threw right-handed. Born in Norwood, Massachusetts, he attended North Attleboro High School. His father, Walt Ripley, also was a major league pitcher.

== Baseball career ==
Ripley spent five and a half years in the Boston Red Sox Minor League system (1973–1978) and averaged 10 wins per season. He entered the majors in 1978 with the Red Sox, playing for them in parts of two seasons before joining the San Francisco Giants (1980–1981) and Chicago Cubs (1982). Primarily a starter, Ripley notched one career save, coming on July 7, 1979. Ripley pitched the last 3 innings of a Red Sox 10-8 victory over the Mariners.

His most productive season came with the 1980 Giants, when he had a 9–10 mark with a 3.54 earned run average in a pitching rotation that included Vida Blue (14–10), Ed Whitson (11–13) and Bob Knepper (9–16).

In a five-season career, Ripley posted a 23–27 record with a 4.50 ERA in 101 pitching appearances, including 67 starts, four complete games, one save, 229 strikeouts and 148 walks in 463 2/3 innings of work.

Additionally, Ripley went 72–41 with a 3.28 ERA in 169 minor league games from 1973 to 1980, striking out 619 while walking 337 in 942 innings.

== Career highlights ==
Ripley's best season came in 1977 with the Red Sox' Triple A affiliate Pawtucket, when he won 15 games and posted a 1.40 ERA, including eight consecutive wins and the highest winning percentage (.789), setting team single season records which stand today. On April 22, 1978, Cleveland Indians' Andre Thornton hit for the cycle in Fenway Park off four different Red Sox pitchers, with the single coming off Ripley; the triple off Bob Stanley; the home run off Jim Wright, and the double off Tom Burgmeier.

== Death ==
Ripley died in 2014 in Boston, Massachusetts at the age of 62. Allen died from complications of leukemia.

== See also ==
- List of second-generation Major League Baseball players
