= Bobby Sprowl =

American baseball player (born 1956)

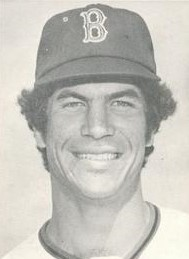
- Pitcher
- Born: April 14, 1956 (age 70); Sandusky, Ohio, U.S.
- Batted: Left Threw: Left

MLB debut
- September 5, 1978, for the Boston Red Sox

Last MLB appearance
- October 3, 1981, for the Houston Astros

MLB statistics
- Win–loss record: 0–3
- Earned run average: 5.44
- Strikeouts: 34
- Stats at Baseball Reference

Teams
- Boston Red Sox (1978); Houston Astros (1979–1981)

Robert John Sprowl (born April 14, 1956) is an American former professional baseball player who was a pitcher in Major League Baseball from 1978 to 1981. He played for the Boston Red Sox and Houston Astros.

== Amateur career ==
Sprowl attended George D. Chamberlain High School, graduating in 1974 and was a star pitcher at the University of Alabama. In 1976, he played collegiate summer baseball with the Wareham Gatemen of the Cape Cod Baseball League, and received the league's Outstanding Pro Prospect award, and helped lead Wareham to the league title. Sprowl led the nation in strikeouts per nine innings in 1977, and was selected by the Red Sox in that year's amateur draft.

== Professional career ==
=== Boston Red Sox ===
Sprowl is best known for losing two critical games in the 1978 pennant race between the Red Sox and New York Yankees. He had compiled a 9-3 record in the AA Eastern League, and Boston's minor league organization claimed that he "had ice water in his veins." Boston manager Don Zimmer gave Sprowl three starts late in the season.

Sprowl's first start was at Baltimore's Memorial Stadium on September 5, where he went seven innings, allowing four runs (three earned) on five hits and three walks, but took the loss when Orioles ace (and future Hall-of-Famer) Jim Palmer stifled the Red Sox, who got a second-inning run on a Dwight Evans RBI double and then nothing more. Sprowl carried the 1-0 lead into the bottom of the seventh, having allowed only two hits to that point, but then surrendered a game-tying home run to Lee May. Andres Mora then hit a ground ball through the legs of Red Sox third baseman Butch Hobson, reaching second base. Sprowl retired Rick Dempsey on a ground ball to shortstop, as pinch-runner Mike Dimmel advanced to third, and then with the infield playing in, Carlos Lopez hit a soft liner that dropped for a hit and allowed Dimmel to score the eventual winning run.

Sprowl's Boston teammates lauded his effort, and Zimmer gave him a second start on September 10 against the Yankees, in the fourth game of a four-game series at Fenway Park. Sprowl walked the first two batters and got Thurman Munson to hit into a double play, but was unable to retire Reggie Jackson and escape the inning, surrendering an RBI single. Sprowl then walked Lou Piniella and Chris Chambliss and was pulled for Bob Stanley, who allowed a hit to drive in two more runs (which were charged to Sprowl) before finishing the inning. The Yankees won the game 7-4, tying Boston for the division lead, and subjecting Zimmer to much second-guessing due to Sprowl's perceived "nerves".

The Red Sox were 1.5 games behind the Yankees when they arrived at Yankee Stadium on September 15, for what would have featured Sprowl's next start. However, Zimmer instead started Luis Tiant on short rest; Tiant lasted only 3 2/3 innings and allowed all four runs in Boston's 4-0 defeat. Zimmer did not use Sprowl at all against the Yankees that weekend, but he started on September 18 at Tiger Stadium against the Tigers. He allowed three runs in five innings, leaving with a 4-3 lead, and Boston won the game in 11 innings. This was Sprowl's last start of the season, as Zimmer went with a four-man rotation of Tiant, Mike Torrez, Dennis Eckersley, and Stanley for the final two weeks. Overall, Sprowl went 0-2 with a 6.39 earned run average with Boston.

=== Houston Astros ===
The following season, Sprowl was traded to the Astros for Craig Minetto. He pitched in 19 games over the next three years, mostly in middle relief. Sprowl was sent back to the minors in 1982 and spent three seasons in the Astros and Baltimore Orioles organizations. The closest he ever got to the majors again was three games for the Astros' top affiliate, the Tucson Toros. Sprowl ended his major-league career with an 0-3 record over four years.

== Coaching career ==
Sprowl is currently the head coach of the Shelton State Community College baseball team.
