= John Hiller =

Canadian baseball player (born 1943)

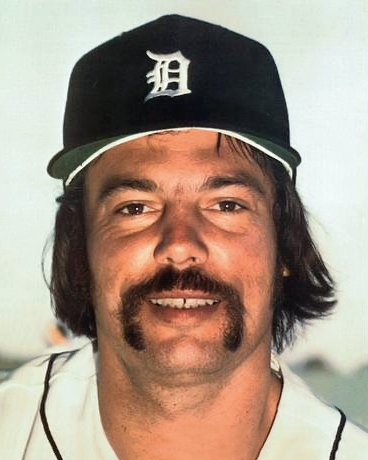
- Hiller in 1975
- Pitcher
- Born: April 8, 1943 (age 83); Toronto, Ontario, Canada
- Batted: Right Threw: Left

MLB debut
- September 6, 1965, for the Detroit Tigers

Last MLB appearance
- May 27, 1980, for the Detroit Tigers

MLB statistics
- Win–loss record: 87–76
- Earned run average: 2.83
- Strikeouts: 1,036
- Saves: 125
- Stats at Baseball Reference

Teams
- Detroit Tigers (1965–1970, 1972–1980)

Career highlights and awards
- All-Star (1974); World Series champion (1968); MLB saves leader (1973)

Member of the Canadian

Baseball Hall of Fame
- Induction: 1985

John Frederick Hiller (born April 8, 1943) is a Canadian former professional baseball relief pitcher who played 15 seasons in Major League Baseball (MLB) for the Detroit Tigers between 1965 and 1980. A native of Toronto, he joined the Tigers in 1965 and was a member of the 1968 Detroit Tigers team that won the World Series. He set a major league record by starting a game with six consecutive strikeouts in 1968.

In January 1971, Hiller suffered a heart attack and underwent intestinal surgery to control his body's absorption of cholesterol. After missing the 1971 season, Hiller returned in 1972, helping the Tigers win the American League (AL) East title and winning Game 4 of the 1972 AL Championship Series. In 1973, he compiled a 1.44 earned run average (ERA) and broke the major league single-season saves record with 38. The Sporting News awarded Hiller its 1973 Comeback Player of the Year and Fireman of the Year awards.

In 1974, Hiller set an AL record with 17 relief wins and was selected as a member of the All-Star team. He continued to rank among the AL's elite relief pitchers through the 1978 season. He retired from playing in May 1980 with a career win–loss record of 87–76, a 2.83 career ERA, and 1,036 strikeouts. He continues to hold the Tigers' club record with 545 career games pitched. Hiller returned to professional baseball in the mid-1980s as a minor league pitching coach for the Tigers. He was inducted into the Canadian Baseball Hall of Fame, the Michigan Sports Hall of Fame, and Canada's Sports Hall of Fame.

== Early years ==
Hiller was born in Toronto in 1943. He grew up in Scarborough, the son of an auto body repairman. He was a fan of the Toronto Maple Leafs while growing up and played ice hockey as a goaltender. He attended David-Mary Thomson Public School and West Hill Collegiate Institute, but dropped out after the 11th grade. He competed as a sprinter in the 220- and 440-yard dashes while in high school. He excelled in baseball as a pitcher, and reportedly once struck out 22 batters in a seven-inning game, including one batter who got on base due to a wild pitch (an uncaught third strike).

== Detroit Tigers ==
=== Minor leagues (1962–1965) ===
In June 1962, Hiller, at age 19, signed a contract with the Detroit Tigers for $400 a month, a pair of spikes, and an old glove. Detroit scout Edwin "Cy" Williams discovered Hiller playing for the Scarborough Selects, an All-Star team composed of local sandlot players.

Hiller played for the Tigers' Jamestown, New York, club in the New York-Pennsylvania League during the 1963 season. He appeared in 29 games, 22 as a starter, and compiled a 14–9 record with a 4.03 ERA, 11 complete games, and 172 strikeouts in 181 innings pitched.

Hiller spent most of the 1964 season with the Duluth-Superior Dukes of the Northern League. He appeared in 30 games for the Dukes, 19 as a starter, and compiled a 10–13 record with a 3.45 ERA.

In 1965, Hiller was assigned to the Montgomery Rebels in the Southern League where he was converted to a relief pitcher. In 47 games for Montgomery (43 in relief), he compiled a 5–7 record with a 2.53 ERA. Hiller noted in early 1966 that he initially viewed the assignment to the bullpen as a demotion, but became accustomed to the role: "You don't have to worry about pacing yourself. You just come in and throw hard all the time. It's more exciting, too, once you accustom yourself to pitching with men on base."

=== 1965–1967 ===
On September 5, 1965, the Tigers purchased Hiller from Montgomery. He made five relief appearances for the 1965 Tigers and did not allow a run in six innings pitched.

Hiller began the 1966 season with the Tigers, but appeared in only one game, pitching two innings in relief against Washington on April 17, giving up two hits and two earned runs. Three days later, Hiller flew back to Detroit where he was hospitalized at Detroit Osteopathic Hospital with pneumonia and pleurisy. On May 11, he was sent down to the Syracuse Chiefs of the International League. He compiled a 4.45 ERA in 54 relief appearances for Syracuse in 1966.

Hiller started the 1967 season with the Toledo Mud Hens of the International League, compiling a 5–1 record with a 3.00 ERA. He was called up by the Tigers in late June for his third stint with the club. Farm director Don Lund noted at the time that Hiller had recently mastered his control on breaking pitches to balance his excellent fastball. Over the last three months of the 1967 season, Hiller appeared in 11 games, eight as a starter, and compiled a 4–2 record with a 2.50 ERA.

=== 1968 and 1969 seasons ===
Hiller spent his first full season in the majors as a reliever and spot starter for the 1968 Tigers team that won the American League pennant and the 1968 World Series. Hiller appeared in 39 games, 12 as a starter, and compiled a 9–6 record with a 2.39 ERA and 78 strikeouts in 128 innings pitched. On August 6, he set a major league record when he struck out six consecutive batters against Cleveland to start a game. On August 20, he pitched a one-hit complete game shutout against the Chicago White Sox; the one hit came in the eighth inning on a ball that just missed Hiller's glove.

Hiller also had two relief appearances in the 1968 World Series against the St. Louis Cardinals, pitching the last two innings in the 7–3 Game 3 loss, and facing five batters without recording an out in Game 4, a 10–1 loss. He allowed six hits and three walks, posting a 13.50 ERA, but the Tigers recovered to win the Series in seven games.

Following a players' strike in the spring of 1969, Hiller returned to the Tigers. He appeared in 40 games for the 1969 Tigers, but his ERA increased by more than a point-and-a-half to 3.99. During the 1969 season, Hiller acquired the nickname "Ratso" after he went with teammates to see the movie Midnight Cowboy. The character "Ratso" Rizzo, played by Dustin Hoffman, had a limp, as did Hiller at the time.

Hiller returned to form in 1970, appearing in 47 games, 42 in relief, and compiling a 6–6 record with a 3.03 ERA. On October 1, in the final game of the season, he pitched a two-hit, complete-game shutout and struck out 11 batters, including seven in a row. With Hiller pitching quickly, the game was played in only one hour and 41 minutes – the fastest game of the year at Tiger Stadium.

=== Heart attack ===
On January 11, 1971, Hiller, at the age of 27, suffered a heart attack at his home in Duluth, Minnesota. Hiller described the attack as follows: "I had just gotten up and was having a cup of coffee. I lit up a cigarette. It was strange – a heaviness in my chest. It felt like the pneumonia I had in 1966 so I put the cigarette out. Later I had another cigarette and had the same feeling. So I didn't smoke the rest of the day." He went to the hospital when the pain returned that night. He was hospitalized for three weeks and notified the Tigers of his heart attack in mid-February. Hiller was placed on a strict diet, quit smoking cigarettes, and lost 20 pounds in the month after his heart attack.

By late March, he weighed 180 pounds, 30 pounds lighter than he had been during the 1970 season. By the time of his 28th birthday, Hiller had lost 40 pounds and four pant sizes in the waist. He reported at the time: "The doctors have never even hinted that I'd be able to pitch again." Despite the pessimism of doctors, Hiller made a birthday promise to himself that he would pitch again. In April, Hiller underwent an ileo-bypass, a surgery in which about the doctors removed seven feet of his small intestines – the portions that are responsible for absorbing cholesterol. The Tigers announced in May that Hiller would not return to the team during the 1971 season. In August 1971, Hiller reported that he had lost 50 pounds (down to 160 pounds) and was selling furniture in Duluth and playing golf and paddleball.

=== The comeback begins in 1972 ===
In February 1972, the Tigers invited Hiller to training camp as a minor league coach for the Lakeland Tigers. After spending the first half of the 1972 season as a pitching coach for Lakeland, Hiller announced in late June that he was running two miles a day, in top shape at 170 pounds, and ready to return to pitching. He said: "I'm ready to go. I'm just waiting for that call from Detroit. It's up to them now if they want me." Hiller suspected that the Tigers' willingness to take a chance on him was impacted by the sudden heart attack and death of Detroit Lions receiver Chuck Hughes during a game at Tiger Stadium in October 1971.

On July 7, 1972, the Tigers reinstated Hiller to their roster. He returned to the mound the next day, having had no rehab games in the minors and after not facing a batter in 18 months. He gave up a two-run home run to the first batter, Dick Allen, but Detroit manager Billy Martin opined that Hiller had pitched well, and Hiller confirmed after the game "this is what I want. I really want it." Two days later, Hiller returned to the mound and retired the side in a victory that gave the Tigers sole possession of first place in the American League East. On October 1, Hiller pitched a complete-game, five-hit victory over Milwaukee Brewers that Jim Hawkins of the Detroit Free Press called the "biggest win of the season". After the game, which was Hiller's first win since October 1, 1970, he told reporters: "I go at this game with a little different attitude than I used to. Before my sickness, I was more uptight every time I pitched. I used to get nervous warming up. Now I don't worry about tomorrow. If I do well, I do well. If I don't – well, there'll aways be another day."

In the last half of the 1972 season, Hiller helped the Tigers win the American League East pennant, appearing in 23 games with a strong 2.03 ERA. He also pitched in three games in the 1972 American League Championship Series against the Oakland Athletics, winning Game 4 when Detroit scored three times in the bottom of the 10th inning.

=== The comeback peaks in 1973 ===
Hiller's comeback peaked in 1973 with what baseball historian Bill James rated as the most valuable season by a relief pitcher in baseball history. Hiller appeared in 65 games, all in relief, and compiled a 10–5 record. He broke Clay Carroll's Major League Baseball record with 38 saves. His single-season saves record stood for 10 years until Dan Quisenberry tallied 45 saves in 1983, and remained a Tigers team record until broken by Todd Jones in 2000.

Hiller also accumulated a career-low 1.44 ERA in 125 innings to win the American League ERA title; Rollie Fingers ranked second at 1.92. Demonstrating how dominant Hiller was during the 1973 season, his Adjusted ERA+, which adjusts a pitcher's ERA according to the pitcher's ballpark and the average ERA of the pitcher's league in a given year, was 285. Only two pitchers in major league history are known to have recorded a higher rating: Hall of Famers Tim Keefe in 1880 (293) and Pedro Martinez in 2000 (291).

Hiller also led the American League's pitchers with 65 appearances and 60 games finished.

On September 30, Hiller became the last man to win a game and the last to throw a pitch in the original Yankee Stadium, getting Yankees' first baseman Mike Hegan to fly out to center field in an 8–5 Detroit win.

As the first major league player to suffer a heart attack and then return an active competitor, Hiller's comeback was rated as "one of the most heartwarming sagas in sports." Slugger Frank Howard called it "the kind of thing you see once in a lifetime." After the 1973 season, Hiller won numerous awards for his remarkable accomplishments, including the following:

- The Sporting News Comeback Player of the Year Award for the American League.
- The Sporting News Fireman of the Year Award for the American League.
- The Hutch Award as the player who "best exemplified the fighting spirit" of Fred Hutchinson.
- Detroit baseball writers selected him as the "Tiger of the Year". Hiller received 32 votes (out of 33 votes cast) for the award, more than any other player in the history of the award to that time.
- Detroit sports writers and broadcasters also selected him as Detroit's "Sportsman of the Year" for 1973.
- In May 1974, the American Heart Association presented Hiller with its Heart of the Year Award which had not previously been awarded to an athlete and which been presented to President Richard Nixon the previous year. The Heart Association cited Hiller "for his courage in meeting the personal challenge of heart attack . . . and for his inspiring example to other heart attack victims."

In an era where no relief pitcher had ever won a Cy Young Award (Mike Marshall became the first one year later), Hiller finished fourth in the voting for the 1973 American League Cy Young Award behind starters Jim Palmer, Nolan Ryan, and Catfish Hunter. He also tied for fourth in the voting for the American League Most Valuable Player Award, behind Reggie Jackson and Rod Carew.

In January 1976, he was honored in Philadelphia with a Most Courageous Athlete award and acknowledged that, prior to the heart attack, he smoked too much, drank too much and ate too much. He described the broader life lesson that he hoped would be drawn from his comeback: "I hope I've helped a lot of people by talking to them. I hope they understand when you have a heart attack you haven't come to the end of your life or the end of your career."

=== 1974 and 1975 seasons ===
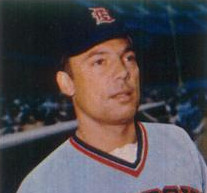
John Hiller in the 1970s

In 1974, Hiller had another strong season as he broke the American League record with 17 relief wins. He appeared in 59 games, all in relief, compiled a 17–14 record with 2.64 ERA and a career-high 134 strikeouts. Hiller won his 10th game of the season on July 1 and was on pace to break Roy Face's major league record of 18 relief wins set in 1959. Two weeks later, he was named to the American League All-Star team for the only time his career, though he did not pitch in the game. On September 13, Hiller recorded his 17th relief win of the season against the Milwaukee Brewers. The win broke the American League record of 16 relief wins set by Dick Radatz in 1964. Bill Campbell tied the record in 1975, but it has not been broken.

In 1975, the Tigers compiled one of the worst seasons in club history with 102 losses and a team ERA of 4.27. However, Hiller had another outstanding season. He opened the season without allowing a run in his first five appearances totaling over 14 innings. He continued to pitch well and, during a stretch from late June to late July, he did not allow a hit in 10 games and 16 2/3 innings. He also struck out 87 batters in 70 2/3 inning pitched – giving him a career-high average of 11.1 strikeouts per nine innings. Hiller noted in late July: "I've never struck out people like this before."

While pitching against Cleveland on July 25, 1975, Hiller "felt something tear" in his throwing arm and was sidelined for the remainder of the season. While trying to come back in September, Hiller reported that, although the pain had subsided, he could still feel a lump under his left arm where the injury occurred. Despite playing only half the season, he led the team with 36 appearances and 14 saves and compiled a 2.17 ERA.

=== 1976–1980 ===
In 1976, Hiller returned to the Tigers' spring training with a shaved head. Sports writers joked that Hiller's head was as smooth as his delivery and compared the new look to Fu Manchu or "a cross between Genghis Khan and Kojak." Hiller got off to a slow start in the early weeks of the 1976 season, holding a 1–3 record and a 3.47 ERA in late May. However, he then regained his form and won 11 of 15 decisions for the balance of the season; his 2.38 ERA was on par with the 2.34 ERA recorded by the team's rookie sensation Mark Fidrych, who won the 1976 Rookie of the Year award. Hiller ranked fourth in the American League in games finished (46) and ninth in both adjusted pitching runs and adjusted pitching wins. He closed the 1976 season with a rare start (his first since 1972) and threw a four-hit, complete-game shutout against the Milwaukee Brewers.

In April 1977, the Tigers traded Willie Horton to the Texas Rangers for relief pitcher Steve Foucault. Foucault edged out Hiller as the Tigers' stopper, as Hiller was asked to pitch both in relief and as a spot starter. He started eight games and threw three complete games. However, his ERA jumped by more than a point to 3.56, and he compiled a record of 8–14 with only seven saves. In late September 1977, doctors diagnosed Hiller with an enlarged liver, possibly caused by the intestinal surgery he received after his heart attack; doctors advised that he should never have another drink for the rest of his life.

Hiller reclaimed his role as the Tigers' closer in 1978. He appeared in 51 games, all in relief, and his total of 46 games finished ranked sixth in the American League. He led the 1978 Tigers with a 2.34 ERA and 15 saves. The Tigers honored Hiller on June 25, 1978, with a John Hiller Recognition Day at Tiger Stadium.

In 1979, Hiller had 43 relief appearances, but Aurelio Lopez (acquired in a trade with the St. Louis Cardinals before the season began) took over as the Tigers' closer as Hiller's ERA soared to 5.22. Hiller played with pain in his left shoulder during the 1979 season, and his season ended on August 27 when he was placed on the disabled list. Hiller believed that he injured his shoulder in mid-May while "messing around trying to throw a screwball."

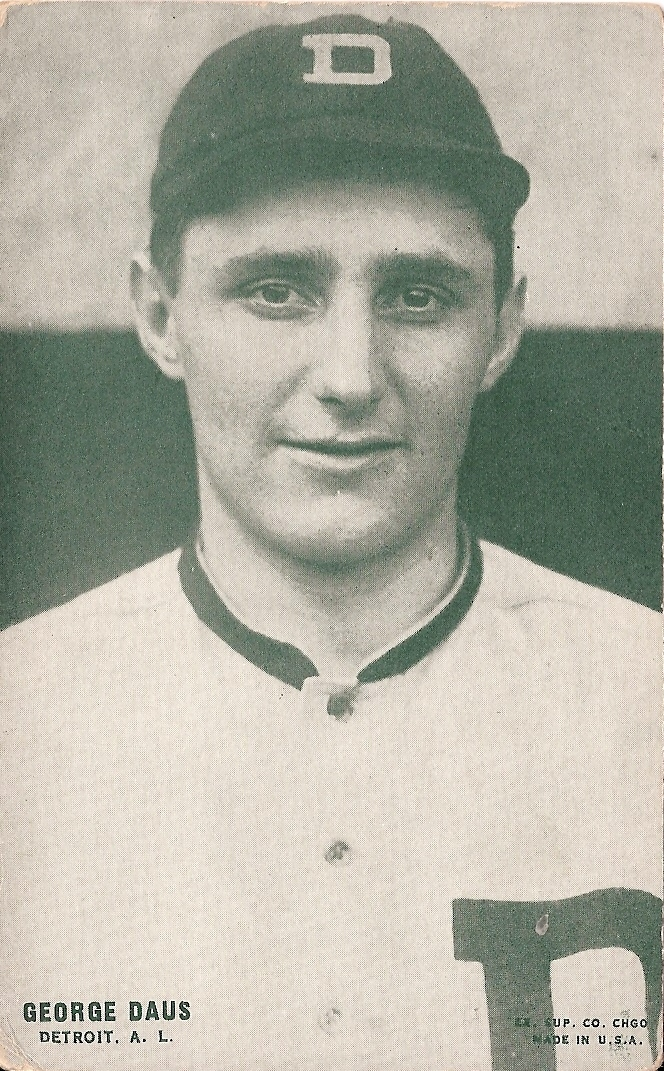
Hiller broke Hooks Dauss' team record of 538 games pitched.

Hiller returned to the Tigers briefly in 1980, just long enough to break Hooks Dauss' franchise record of 538 games pitched. Hiller broke Dauss' record on April 29 and ended his career having appeared in 545 games as a Tiger. He was the last member of Detroit's 1968 World Series championship team to remain with the club. During the 1970s, Hiller appeared in 426 games for the Tigers, nearly double the total of any other Detroit pitcher.

On May 30, 1980, after finishing a clubhouse card game with teammates, Hiller called a team meeting and announced that he was retiring. The Tigers interrupted the game that night to announce Hiller's decision. Hiller stepped out of the dugout in street clothes and waved to the crowd. The crowd reacted with polite applause at the surprise announcement and then began chanting, "We want Hiller! We want Hiller!" until the game was interrupted to allow Hiller to step onto the field for a final bow. Hiller told reporters after the game: "I just don't think I can compete here anymore. . . . I don't want to embarrass myself. I always said the hitters would let me know when it was time to retire, and they did."

After his retirement, the Detroit Free Press paid tribute to Hiller, not on its sports page but on its editorial page:

"[W]hat sets the John Hiller story apart is neither the professional skill nor the personal grace and style that were his in such an abundant measure. Detroiters have a special affection for Hiller for what he had to overcome and for the dogged persistence with which he fought his way back from a heart attack. By will and discipline, he made himself a fit professional athlete again. He overcame."

Hiller ended his career with a record of 87–76, a 2.83 ERA, 545 appearances, and 1,036 strikeouts in 1,242 innings pitched. At the time of his retirement, his 125 saves ranked behind only Sparky Lyle (231), Hoyt Wilhelm (154) and Rollie Fingers (136) in major league history, and remained a Detroit Tigers club record until 1993.

== Family, later years, and honors ==
Hiller married Janis Patricia Baldwin in 1965. They had three children, including son Steve and daughter Wendy. His first marriage ended in divorce in February 1985, and he married his second wife, Linette, later that year.

After retiring from baseball, Hiller returned to his home in Duluth, Minnesota. Hiller and his first wife had lived in Duluth since 1966. In 1982, he bought an abandoned farm near Felch in Michigan's Upper Peninsula and played baseball for the Felch Rangers. He was appointed constable for Felch in 1983. Hiller later lived for more than 30 years in Hermansville and then Iron Mountain, both in the Upper Peninsula.

He also supported himself with jobs selling insurance, owning a pet shop, operating a country store, and working as a Pepsi distributor. From 1985 to 1987, he returned to professional baseball as a minor league pitching coach for the Tigers. His coaching career ended when he was diagnosed in 1988 with a blockage behind his right knee that had caused the arteries in his lower leg to deteriorate. Doctors recommended amputation, but Hiller declined.

Hiller has been inducted into several halls of fame, including the Canadian Baseball Hall of Fame (inducted 1985), Michigan Sports Hall of Fame (inducted 1989), Canada's Sports Hall of Fame (inducted 1999), and the Ontario Sports Hall of Fame (inducted 2017).

== See also ==
- List of Detroit Tigers team records
- List of Major League Baseball annual saves leaders
- List of Major League Baseball players who spent their entire career with one franchise
