= 1978 Detroit Tigers season =

Major League Baseball season

1978 Detroit Tigers
- League: American League
- Division: East
- Ballpark: Tiger Stadium
- City: Detroit, Michigan
- Owners: John Fetzer
- General managers: Jim Campbell
- Managers: Ralph Houk
- Television: WWJ-TV (George Kell, Mike Barry, Joe Pellegrino, Al Kaline)
- Radio: WJR (Ernie Harwell, Paul Carey)

The 1978 Detroit Tigers season was the team's 78th season and the 67th season at Tiger Stadium. The Tigers finished in fifth place in the American League East with a record of 86–76, 13½ games behind the Yankees. They outscored their opponents 714 to 653.

It was the franchise's first winning season since 1973 and would start a string of winning seasons that would not come to an end until 1989.

== Offseason ==
- January 10, 1978: Chris Codiroli was drafted by the Tigers in the 1st round (11th pick) of the 1978 Major League Baseball draft.
- January 30, 1978: Tito Fuentes was purchased from the Tigers by the Montreal Expos.

== Regular season ==
The Tigers drew 1,714,893 fans to Tiger Stadium in 1978, ranking 5th of the 14 teams in the American League.

=== Season standings ===
AL East
Team	W	L	Pct.	GB	Home	Road
New York Yankees	100	63	.613	—	55‍–‍26	45‍–‍37
Boston Red Sox	99	64	.607	1	59‍–‍23	40‍–‍41
Milwaukee Brewers	93	69	.574	6½	54‍–‍27	39‍–‍42
Baltimore Orioles	90	71	.559	9	51‍–‍30	39‍–‍41
Detroit Tigers	86	76	.531	13½	47‍–‍34	39‍–‍42
Cleveland Indians	69	90	.434	29	42‍–‍36	27‍–‍54
Toronto Blue Jays	59	102	.366	40	37‍–‍44	22‍–‍58

=== Record vs. opponents ===
1978 American League record Sources:
Team	BAL	BOS	CAL	CWS	CLE	DET	KC	MIL	MIN	NYY	OAK	SEA	TEX	TOR
Baltimore	—	7–8	4–6	8–1	9–6	7–8	2–8	7–8	5–5	6–9	11–0	9–1	7–4	8–7
Boston	8–7	—	9–2	7–3	7–8	12–3	4–6	10–5	9–2	7–9	5–5	7–3	3–7	11–4
California	6–4	2–9	—	8–7	6–4	4–7	9–6	5–5	12–3	5–5	9–6	9–6	5–10	7–3
Chicago	1–8	3–7	7–8	—	8–2	2–9	8–7	4–7	8–7	1–9	7–8	7–8	11–4	4–6
Cleveland	6–9	8–7	4–6	2–8	—	5–10	5–6	5–10	5–5	6–9	4–6	8–1	1–9	10–4
Detroit	8–7	3–12	7–4	9–2	10–5	—	4–6	7–8	4–6	4–11	6–4	8–2	7–3	9–6
Kansas City	8–2	6–4	6–9	7–8	6–5	6–4	—	6–4	7–8	6–5	10–5	12–3	7–8	5–5
Milwaukee	8–7	5–10	5–5	7–4	10–5	8–7	4–6	—	4–7	10–5	9–1	5–5	6–4	12–3
Minnesota	5–5	2–9	3–12	7–8	5–5	6–4	8–7	7–4	—	3–7	9–6	6–9	6–9	6–4
New York	9–6	9–7	5–5	9–1	9–6	11–4	5–6	5–10	7–3	—	8–2	6–5	6–4	11–4
Oakland	0–11	5–5	6–9	8–7	6–4	4–6	5–10	1–9	6–9	2–8	—	13–2	6–9	7–4
Seattle	1–9	3–7	6–9	8–7	1–8	2–8	3–12	5–5	9–6	5–6	2–13	—	3–12	8–2
Texas	4–7	7–3	10–5	4–11	9–1	3–7	8–7	4–6	9–6	4–6	9–6	12–3	—	4–7
Toronto	7–8	4–11	3–7	6–4	4–10	6–9	5–5	3–12	4–6	4–11	4–7	2–8	7–4	—

=== Notable transactions ===
- June 6, 1978: 1978 Major League Baseball draft
  - Kirk Gibson was drafted by the Tigers in the 1st round (12th pick).
  - Jerry Ujdur was drafted by the Tigers in the 4th round.

=== Roster ===
1978 Detroit Tigers
Roster
Pitchers: 36 Fernando Arroyo; 31 Steve Baker; 41 Jack Billingham; 42 Sheldon Burnside; 28 Jim Crawford; 20 Mark Fidrych; 29 Steve Foucault; 48 Ed Glynn; 18 John Hiller; 47 Jack Morris; 19 Dave Rozema; 21 Jim Slaton; 27 Bob Sykes; 32 Bruce Taylor; 38 Dave Tobik; 39 Milt Wilcox; 37 Kip Young	Catchers: 12 Milt May; 13 Lance Parrish; Infielders: 7 Steve Dillard; 2 Phil Mankowski; 4 Aurelio Rodríguez; 30 Jason Thompson; 3 Alan Trammell; 5 Mark Wagner; 1 Lou Whitaker	Outfielders: 25 Tim Corcoran; 33 Steve Kemp; 8 Ron LeFlore; 34 Charlie Spikes; 24 Mickey Stanley; 22 Dave Stegman; 14 John Wockenfuss; Other batters: 10 Rusty Staub	Manager: 35 Ralph Houk; Coaches: 26 Gates Brown; 52 Fred Gladding; 51 Fred Hatfield; 50 Jim Hegan; 53 Dick Tracewski

== Player stats ==
= Indicates team leader

=== Batting ===
==== Starters by position ====
Note: Pos = Position; G = Games played; AB = At bats; H = Hits; Avg. = Batting average; HR = Home runs; RBI = Runs batted in

Pos	Player	G	AB	H	Avg.	HR	RBI
C	Milt May	105	352	88	.250	10	37
1B	Jason Thompson	153	589	169	.287	26	79
2B	Lou Whitaker	139	484	138	.285	3	58
3B	Aurelio Rodríguez	134	385	102	.265	7	43
SS	Alan Trammell	139	448	120	.268	2	34
LF	Steve Kemp	159	582	161	.277	15	79
CF	Ron LeFlore	155	666	198	.297	12	62
RF	Tim Corcoran	116	324	86	.265	1	27
DH	Rusty Staub	162	642	175	.273	24	121

==== Other batters ====
Note: G = Games played; AB = At bats; H = Hits; Avg. = Batting average; HR = Home runs; RBI = Runs batted in

Player	G	AB	H	Avg.	HR	RBI
Lance Parrish	85	288	63	.219	14	41
Phil Mankowski	88	222	61	.275	4	20
John Wockenfuss	71	187	53	.283	7	22
Mickey Stanley	53	151	40	.265	3	8
Steve Dillard	56	130	29	.223	0	7
Mark Wagner	39	109	26	.239	0	6
Charlie Spikes	10	28	7	.250	0	2
Dave Stegman	8	14	4	.286	1	3

=== Pitching ===
==== Starting pitchers ====
Note: G = Games; IP = Innings pitched; W = Wins; L = Losses; ERA = Earned run average; SO = Strikeouts

Player	G	IP	W	L	ERA	SO
Jim Slaton	35	233.2	17	11	4.12	92
Milt Wilcox	29	215.1	13	12	3.76	132
Dave Rozema	28	209.1	9	12	3.14	57
Jack Billingham	30	201.2	15	8	3.88	59
Kip Young	14	105.2	6	7	2.81	49
Mark Fidrych	3	22.0	2	0	2.45	10

==== Other pitchers ====
Note: G = Games; IP = Innings pitched; W = Wins; L = Losses; ERA = Earned run average; SO = Strikeouts

Player	G	IP	W	L	ERA	SO
Jack Morris	28	106.0	3	5	4.33	48
Bob Sykes	22	93.2	6	6	3.94	58
Steve Baker	15	63.1	2	4	4.55	39

==== Relief pitchers ====
Note: G = Games pitched; W = Wins; L = Losses; SV = Saves; GF = Games finished; ERA = Earned run average; SO = Strikeouts

Player	G	W	L	SV	GF	ERA	SO
John Hiller	51	9	4	14	46	2.34	74
Steve Foucault	24	2	4	4	15	3.13	18
Jim Crawford	20	2	3	0	10	4.35	24
Ed Glynn	10	0	0	0	6	3.07	9
Dave Tobik	5	0	0	0	4	3.75	11
Fernando Arroyo	2	0	0	0	1	8.31	1
Sheldon Burnside	2	0	0	0	1	9.00	3
Bruce Taylor	1	0	0	0	1	0.00	0

== Awards and honors ==
Lou Whitaker

- AL Rookie of the Year Award

Ron LeFlore

- Tiger of the Year Award, from Detroit baseball writers

=== All-Stars ===
Jason Thompson, reserve (Second career All-Star appearance)

=== League top ten finishers ===
Steve Kemp

- #3 in AL in bases on balls (97)
- #4 in AL in times on base (259)
- #5 in AL in games played (159)

Ron LeFlore

- MLB leader in runs scored (126)
- AL leader in stolen bases (68)
- AL leader in singles (153)
- #2 in AL in hits (198)
- #2 in AL in runs created (105)
- #2 in MLB in at bats (666)
- #2 in MLB in plate appearances (741)
- #3 in MLB in times on base (267)
- #3 in AL in outs (501)
- #4 in AL in Power/Speed Number (20.4)
- #5 in AL in times caught stealing (16)

Dave Rozema

- #5 in MLB in bases on balls per 9 innings pitched (1.76)

Jim Slaton

- #4 in AL in hit batsmen (8)
- #5 in AL in wild pitches (10)

Rusty Staub

- #2 in MLB in RBIs (121)
- #2 in MLB in games played (162)
- #2 in AL in sacrifice flies (11)
- #2 in AL in at bats per strikeout (18.3)
- #2 in AL in outs (505)
- #3 in AL in at bats (642)
- #3 in MLB in plate appearances (734)
- #3 in MLB in times grounded into double plays (24)
- #4 in AL total bases (279)
- #5 in AL in hits (175)
- #5 in AL in times on base (254)

Jason Thompson

- #4 in AL in runs created (104)
- #5 in AL in total bases (278)

Milt Wilcox

- #4 in AL in hit batsmen (8)

=== Players ranking among top 100 all time at position ===
The following members of the 1979 Detroit Tigers are among the Top 100 of all time at their position, as ranked by The Bill James Historical Baseball Abstract in 2001:

- Lance Parrish: 19th best catcher of all time (played 12 games as a rookie)
- Lou Whitaker: 13th best second baseman of all time (played 11 games as a rookie)
- Alan Trammell: 9th best shortstop of all time (played 19 games as a rookie)
- Aurelio Rodríguez: 91st best third baseman of all time
- Ron LeFlore: 80th best center fielder of all time

== Farm system ==
Level	Team	League	Manager
AAA	Evansville Triplets	American Association	Les Moss
AA	Montgomery Rebels	Southern League	Eddie Brinkman
A	Lakeland Tigers	Florida State League	Jim Leyland
Rookie	Bristol Tigers	Appalachian League	Joe Lewis
