= The Sporting News Reliever of the Year Award =

Major League Baseball award (1960–2010)

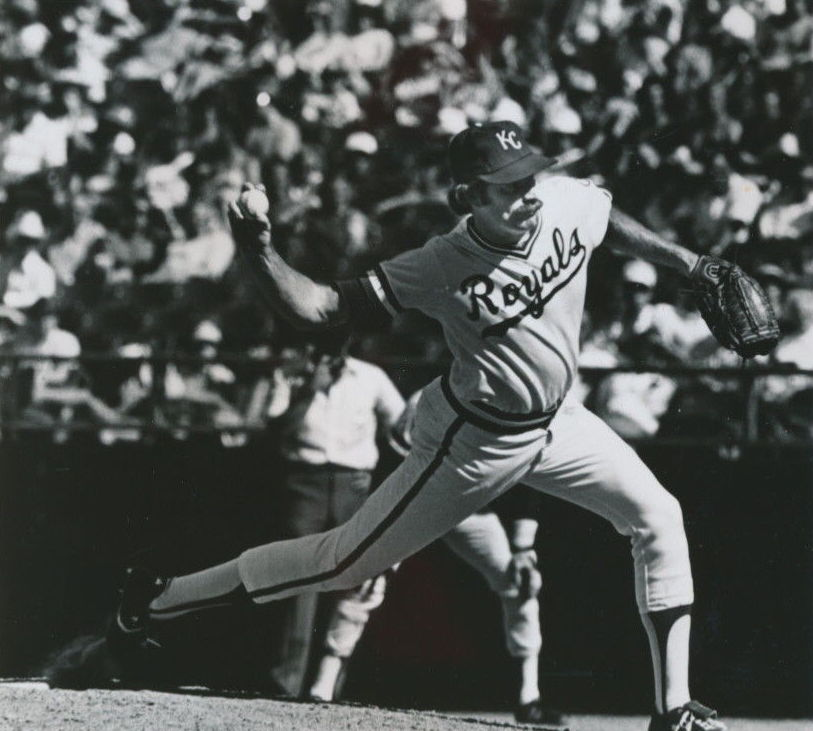
- Five-time winner Dan Quisenberry
- Sport: Baseball
- League: Major League Baseball
- Awarded for: Most outstanding relief pitcher in the American League and National League
- Country: United States, Canada
- Presented by: Sporting News

History
- First award: 1960
- Final award: 2010
- Most wins: Mariano Rivera (6)

The Sporting News Reliever of the Year Award was an annual award presented to the best relief pitcher in each league in Major League Baseball (MLB). It was established in 1960 by The Sporting News (TSN) as the Fireman of the Year Award. At the time, no reliever had ever received a Cy Young Award vote. The Fireman of the Year Award originally recognized the reliever with the most combined saves and wins in each league in MLB. The magazine had started publishing the then-unofficial save statistic that same year. Later, a save was worth two points compared to one for a win in determining the winner. In 2001 the award was chosen based on consensus from TSN editors, and it was renamed to Reliever of the Year Award. The award was last issued in 2010.

== Fireman of the Year Award winners ==
Year	American League	Team	National League	Team
1960	Mike Fornieles	Boston Red Sox	Lindy McDaniel	St. Louis Cardinals
1961	Luis Arroyo	New York Yankees	Stu Miller	San Francisco Giants
1962	Dick Radatz	Boston Red Sox	Roy Face	Pittsburgh Pirates
1963	Stu Miller (2)	Baltimore Orioles	Lindy McDaniel (2)	Chicago Cubs
1964	Dick Radatz (2)	Boston Red Sox	Al McBean	Pittsburgh Pirates
1965	Eddie Fisher	Chicago White Sox	Ted Abernathy	Chicago Cubs
1966	Jack Aker	Kansas City A's	Phil Regan	Los Angeles Dodgers
1967	Minnie Rojas	California Angels	Ted Abernathy (2)	Cincinnati Reds
1968	Wilbur Wood	Chicago White Sox	Phil Regan (2)	Chicago Cubs
1969	Ron Perranoski	Minnesota Twins	Wayne Granger	Cincinnati Reds
1970	Ron Perranoski (2)	Minnesota Twins	Wayne Granger (2)	Cincinnati Reds
1971	Ken Sanders	Milwaukee Brewers	Dave Giusti	Pittsburgh Pirates
1972	Sparky Lyle	New York Yankees	Clay Carroll	Cincinnati Reds
1973	John Hiller	Detroit Tigers	Mike Marshall	Montreal Expos
1974	Terry Forster	Chicago White Sox	Mike Marshall (2)	Los Angeles Dodgers
1975	Rich Gossage	Chicago White Sox	Al Hrabosky	St. Louis Cardinals
1976	Bill Campbell	Minnesota Twins	Rawly Eastwick	Cincinnati Reds
1977	Bill Campbell (2)	Boston Red Sox	Rollie Fingers	San Diego Padres
1978	Rich Gossage (2)	New York Yankees	Rollie Fingers (2)	San Diego Padres
1979	Jim Kern; Mike Marshall (3)	Texas Rangers; Minnesota Twins	Bruce Sutter	Chicago Cubs
1980	Dan Quisenberry	Kansas City Royals	Rollie Fingers (3); Tom Hume	San Diego Padres; Cincinnati Reds
1981	Rollie Fingers (4)	Milwaukee Brewers	Bruce Sutter (2)	St. Louis Cardinals
1982	Dan Quisenberry (2)	Kansas City Royals	Bruce Sutter (3)	St. Louis Cardinals
1983	Dan Quisenberry (3)	Kansas City Royals	Al Holland; Lee Smith	Philadelphia Phillies; Chicago Cubs
1984	Dan Quisenberry (4)	Kansas City Royals	Bruce Sutter (4)	St. Louis Cardinals
1985	Dan Quisenberry (5)	Kansas City Royals	Jeff Reardon	Montreal Expos
1986	Dave Righetti	New York Yankees	Todd Worrell	St. Louis Cardinals
1987	Jeff Reardon (2); Dave Righetti (2)	Minnesota Twins; New York Yankees	Steve Bedrosian	Philadelphia Phillies
1988	Dennis Eckersley	Oakland Athletics	John Franco	Cincinnati Reds
1989	Jeff Russell	Texas Rangers	Mark Davis	San Diego Padres
1990	Bobby Thigpen	Chicago White Sox	John Franco (2)	New York Mets
1991	Dennis Eckersley (2); Bryan Harvey	Oakland Athletics; California Angels	Lee Smith (2)	St. Louis Cardinals
1992	Dennis Eckersley (3)	Oakland Athletics	Doug Jones; Lee Smith (3)	Houston Astros; St. Louis Cardinals
1993	Jeff Montgomery	Kansas City Royals	Randy Myers	Chicago Cubs
1994	Lee Smith (4)	Baltimore Orioles	John Franco (3)	New York Mets
1995	José Mesa	Cleveland Indians	Randy Myers (2)	Chicago Cubs
1996	John Wetteland	New York Yankees	Trevor Hoffman	San Diego Padres
1997	Mariano Rivera	New York Yankees	Jeff Shaw	Cincinnati Reds
1998	Tom Gordon	Boston Red Sox	Trevor Hoffman (2)	San Diego Padres
1999	Mariano Rivera (2)	New York Yankees	Ugueth Urbina	Montreal Expos
2000	Todd Jones	Detroit Tigers	Antonio Alfonseca	Florida Marlins

== Reliever of the Year Award winners ==
Year	American League	Team	National League	Team
2001	Mariano Rivera (3)	New York Yankees	Armando Benítez; Robb Nen	New York Mets; San Francisco Giants
2002	Billy Koch	Oakland Athletics	John Smoltz	Atlanta Braves
2003	Keith Foulke	Oakland Athletics	Éric Gagné	Los Angeles Dodgers
2004	Mariano Rivera (4)	New York Yankees	Éric Gagné (2)	Los Angeles Dodgers
2005	Mariano Rivera (5); Joe Nathan	New York Yankees; Minnesota Twins	Chad Cordero	Washington Nationals
2006	Francisco Rodríguez	Los Angeles Angels of Anaheim	Trevor Hoffman (3)	San Diego Padres
2007	Joe Borowski	Cleveland Indians	José Valverde	Arizona Diamondbacks
2008	Francisco Rodríguez (2)	Los Angeles Angels of Anaheim	Brad Lidge	Philadelphia Phillies
2009	Mariano Rivera (6)	New York Yankees	Ryan Franklin	St. Louis Cardinals
2010	Rafael Soriano	Tampa Bay Rays	Heath Bell	San Diego Padres

== See also ==
- Major League Baseball Reliever of the Year Award
  - also known as the Mariano Rivera AL Reliever of the Year Award and Trevor Hoffman NL Reliever of the Year Award
- Rolaids Relief Man of the Year Award (discontinued)
- "Esurance MLB Awards" Best Pitcher (in MLB)
- "Players Choice Awards" Outstanding Pitcher
- Warren Spahn Award (best left-handed pitcher)
- Baseball awards
- List of Major League Baseball awards
- The Sporting News Starting Pitcher of the Year
- The Sporting News Relief Pitcher of the Year
- The Sporting News Player of the Year
- The Sporting News Rookie of the Year
- The Sporting News Comeback Player of the Year
- The Sporting News Manager of the Year
- The Sporting News MLB Executive of the Year
