= Mike O'Berry =

American baseball player (born 1954)

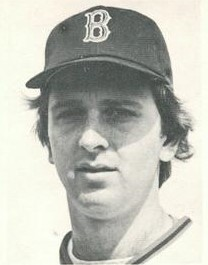
- Catcher
- Born: April 20, 1954 (age 72); Birmingham, Alabama, U.S.
- Batted: Right Threw: Right

MLB debut
- April 8, 1979, for the Boston Red Sox

Last MLB appearance
- October 4, 1985, for the Montreal Expos

MLB statistics
- Batting average: .191
- Home runs: 3
- Runs batted in: 27
- Stats at Baseball Reference

Teams
- Boston Red Sox (1979); Chicago Cubs (1980); Cincinnati Reds (1981–1982); California Angels (1983); New York Yankees (1984); Montreal Expos (1985)

Preston Michael O'Berry (born April 20, 1954) is an American former professional baseball player and minor league manager. He played as a catcher in Major League Baseball from 1979 to 1985.

== Major league career ==
O'Berry was drafted at the age of 21 by the Boston Red Sox in the twenty-second round of the 1975 amateur player draft. He made his major league debut with the Red Sox on April 18, 1979. At the end of the 1979 season, O'Berry was traded to the Chicago Cubs as the player to be named later in an earlier deal the Red Sox made for Ted Sizemore. O'Berry continued to move from team to team after one or two years, serving as a journeyman backup catcher for the Cubs, Cincinnati Reds, California Angels, New York Yankees, and Montreal Expos before retiring after the 1985 season at the age of 31.

== Managerial career ==
O'Berry managed minor league and independent teams from 1992 to 1998. In his first season, he managed the Bluefield Orioles to their first Appalachian League championship title. He stayed in the Baltimore Orioles organization until 1996, which was the first of his three seasons with the independent Tennessee Tomahawks. After his stint as a professional baseball manager, O'Berry decided to stay close to home and coach the Pelham High School Panthers. O'Berry coached the team from 2001 to 2006, leading the team to its first state title in 2004. Under his reign, the team gained national recognition and was a powerhouse in the 6A division.

Preceded by Pete Mackanin	Frederick Keys manager 1994–1995	Succeeded by Tim Blackwell
