= Dennis Kinney =

American baseball player (born 1952)

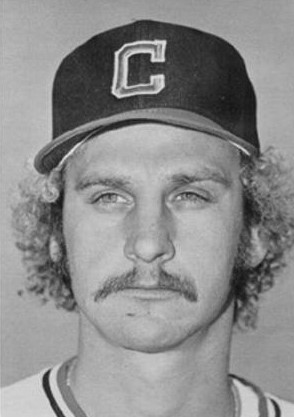
- Pitcher
- Born: February 26, 1952 (age 73); Toledo, Ohio, U.S.
- Batted: Left Threw: Left

MLB debut
- May 9, 1978, for the Cleveland Indians

Last MLB appearance
- May 20, 1982, for the Oakland Athletics

MLB statistics
- Win–loss record: 4–9
- Earned run average: 4.55
- Strikeouts: 75
- Stats at Baseball Reference

Teams
- Cleveland Indians (1978); San Diego Padres (1978–1980); Detroit Tigers (1981); Oakland Athletics (1982)

Dennis Paul Kinney (born February 26, 1952) is a former Major League Baseball pitcher. He played all or parts of five seasons in the majors, from 1978 until 1982. He played high school baseball for Bedford Senior High School in Temperance, Michigan.

Kinney was selected by the Cleveland Indians in the 10th round of the 1970 Major League Baseball draft, and he played in their organization through his major league debut in 1978. He was given a chance at closing games for the Indians, notching five saves in 18 games. That June, however, he was traded to the San Diego Padres for pitcher Dan Spillner.

Kinney's one full season in the majors came in 1980 for the Padres. That year, he pitched in 50 games as a reliever, compiling a 4–6 record with a 4.25 ERA and one save. In December, he was traded to the Detroit Tigers for outfielder Dave Stegman, but appeared in just six games for the Tigers before being released in the offseason. After a brief trial with the Oakland Athletics in 1982, his major league career was over.

On August 21, 1980, with the Padres trailing the host Philadelphia Phillies, 7–6, Kinney came in to pitch the bottom of the 8th inning surrendering a single and a run-scoring double to the first two batters he faced. The Padres rallied with 2 runs of their own in the top of the 9th inning to tie the score, 8–8. The relief appearance lasted 9 1/3 innings as Bake McBride's triple plated a run in the bottom of the 17th inning for the Phillies' 9–8 victory.
