= Joel Finch =

American baseball player (born 1956)

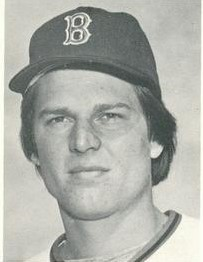
- Pitcher
- Born: August 20, 1956 (age 70); South Bend, Indiana, U.S.
- Batted: Right Threw: Right

MLB debut
- June 12, 1979, for the Boston Red Sox

Last MLB appearance
- September 27, 1979, for the Boston Red Sox

MLB statistics
- Win–loss record: 0–3
- Earned run average: 4.87
- Strikeouts: 25
- Stats at Baseball Reference

Teams
- Boston Red Sox (1979)

Joel D. Finch (born August 20, 1956) is an American former pitcher in Major League Baseball who played briefly for the Boston Red Sox during the 1979 season. Listed at 6' 2", 175 lb., he batted and threw right-handed.

Finch posted a 0–3 record with 25 strikeouts, 25 walks and a 4.87 earned run average in 15 pitching appearances, including seven starts, five games finished, and 57⅓ innings of work.
