= Rick Wise =

American baseball player (born 1945)

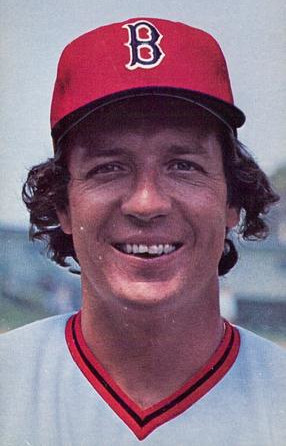
- Pitcher
- Born: September 13, 1945 (age 81); Jackson, Michigan, U.S.
- Batted: Right Threw: Right

MLB debut
- April 18, 1964, for the Philadelphia Phillies

Last MLB appearance
- April 10, 1982, for the San Diego Padres

MLB statistics
- Win–loss record: 188–181
- Earned run average: 3.69
- Strikeouts: 1,647
- Stats at Baseball Reference

Teams
- Philadelphia Phillies (1964, 1966–1971); St. Louis Cardinals (1972–1973); Boston Red Sox (1974–1977); Cleveland Indians (1978–1979); San Diego Padres (1980–1982)

Career highlights and awards
- 2× All-Star (1971, 1973); Pitched a no-hitter on June 23, 1971

Richard Charles Wise (born September 13, 1945) is an American former professional baseball player and coach. He played in Major League Baseball as a right-handed pitcher between 1964 and 1982 for the Philadelphia Phillies, St. Louis Cardinals, Boston Red Sox, Cleveland Indians and the San Diego Padres. The two-time National League All-Star pitched a no-hitter on June 23, 1971 - and slugged two home runs to support his own effort. Wise was the winning pitcher for the Boston Red Sox in Game 6 of the 1975 World Series, considered by some to be the greatest Series game ever played.

== Early life ==
Richard Charles Wise was born on September 13, 1945, in Jackson, Michigan. Wise grew up in Portland, Oregon, and led his Rose City Little League team to the Little League World Series in 1958, making him one of a handful of major league players to have played in both the Little League and Major League World Series. He attended Madison High School in Portland, Oregon, where he excelled in baseball.

== Professional career ==
=== Philadelphia Phillies (1964, 1966–1971) ===
Wise was 18 years of age when he debuted for the Philadelphia Phillies in 1964, his second professional season. His first major league win was in the second game of a doubleheader on June 21, beating the New York Mets 8–2. The first game that day was Jim Bunning's perfect game. Wise was the last player from the 1964 Philadelphia Phillies team to be active in the major leagues, pitching two innings of relief (7th and 8th) for the Padres against the Los Angeles Dodgers on April 10, 1982. He spent all of 1965 and the early part of 1966 with the Phillies' top minor league affiliate (the Arkansas Travelers in 1965 and the San Diego Padres in 1966) before making the majors for good.

He developed into a solid starter, winning 17 games with a 2.88 earned run average for a last-place Phillies team in 1971, as well as being named to his first All-Star Game. The highlight of Wise's Philadelphia career took place that year on June 23 when he overcame the flu to no-hit the Cincinnati Reds in a 4–0 win at Riverfront Stadium. Only a sixth-inning walk to Dave Concepcion denied Wise what would have been the second perfect game in Phillies history. He also contributed a pair of homers, a one-out two-run home run off Ross Grimsley in the fifth and a leadoff solo shot off Clay Carroll in the eighth. Wise, Wes Ferrell (1931), Jim Tobin (1944), and Earl Wilson (1962) are the only pitchers to throw a no-hitter and hit a home run in the same game. On August 28 against the San Francisco Giants, Wise also hit two home runs. On September 18 against the Chicago Cubs, he completed a string of retiring 32 batters in a row, four shy of Harvey Haddix's Major League record, also driving in the winning run in the 12th inning.

=== St. Louis Cardinals (1972–1973) ===
The following season, Wise became an unwitting participant in one of the most one-sided trades in baseball history. The owner of the St. Louis Cardinals, Gussie Busch, ordered his team to trade its star left-handed pitcher, Steve Carlton, after a contract squabble. Since all of baseball knew of the trade mandate, teams drove very hard bargains, and the Phillies' offer of Wise was the best St. Louis could do. Wise won a total of 32 games during his two seasons (1972–73) in St. Louis, but Carlton won 27 for the last-place 1972 Phillies alone and would go on to anchor their starting pitching staff for the next decade, ultimately winning 329 games and a place in the Baseball Hall of Fame.

At the time, however, the Carlton-Wise deal made some sense from the Cardinals' perspective. At the time, Wise had won 75 games, only two fewer than Carlton. Tim McCarver, who had caught for Carlton in St. Louis and Wise in Philadelphia, said at the time that the trade was "a real good one for a real good one." According to McCarver, Wise had better command on the mound while Carlton had more raw ability. This viewpoint can be confirmed statistically; while Carlton had averaged more career strikeouts per 9 innings at the time, Wise allowed fewer walks and actually had the better career strikeout-to-walk ratio through 1971.

On June 13, 1973, Wise, having already pitched one no-hitter against the Reds, nearly joined Addie Joss as the only pitchers to no-hit the same team twice (the Cleveland Naps pitcher's two no-hitters were against the Chicago White Sox, in 1908 and 1910; the former was a perfect game). This bid, however, was broken up in the ninth on a one-out single by Joe Morgan—the only hit Wise would allow.

=== Boston Red Sox (1974–1977) ===
Wise was traded along with Bernie Carbo from the Cardinals to the Red Sox for Reggie Smith and Ken Tatum on October 26, 1973. In 1975, he won 19 for the Red Sox, winners of the AL East. Wise had another no-hitter broken up against the Milwaukee Brewers on July 2. In the first game of a doubleheader, former Red Sox George Scott homered off Wise with two out in the ninth to break up the no-hitter. Wise would have joined Cy Young and Jim Bunning as pitchers who had hurled no-hitters in both leagues (Nolan Ryan, Hideo Nomo and Randy Johnson have done it since). Wise went on to win his only start in the 1975 ALCS against Oakland, and was the relief pitcher of record in Game 6 when Carlton Fisk ended the 12-inning game with his oft-replayed walk-off home run.

On June 30, 1976, Wise was perfect against the Orioles until Paul Blair singled against him to start the sixth. That was the only hit the Orioles would get off Wise as Boston won 2–0.

=== Cleveland Indians (1978–1979) ===
In 1978 Wise was involved in a trade for a future Hall of Famer for the second time in his career. On March 30, during spring training, he was traded by the Boston Red Sox with Ted Cox, Bo Díaz and Mike Paxton to the Cleveland Indians for Fred Kendall and future Hall of Fame starter and reliever Dennis Eckersley.

Wise led the AL in losses in 1978 with 19, but again came back to win 15 games for a poor team in 1979.

=== San Diego Padres (1980–1982) ===
Wise became a free agent after the season, signing with the San Diego Padres. He played two full seasons with the Padres, and was released after appearing in just one game for them in 1982, ending his playing career.

=== Overview ===
In an 18-year career, Wise posted a 188–181 record with 1,647 strikeouts and a 3.69 ERA in 3,127 innings pitched. He pitched a total of 30 shutouts. He was the first player to record a win over all 26 major league teams that existed before the 1993 expansion.

A good-hitting pitcher, Wise hit 15 home runs in his career, with a season-high of six in 1971. He batted .195 (130-668) with 60 runs and 66 RBI. Defensively, in 723 total chances, he committed only 13 errors, for a .982 fielding percentage.

== Post-playing career ==
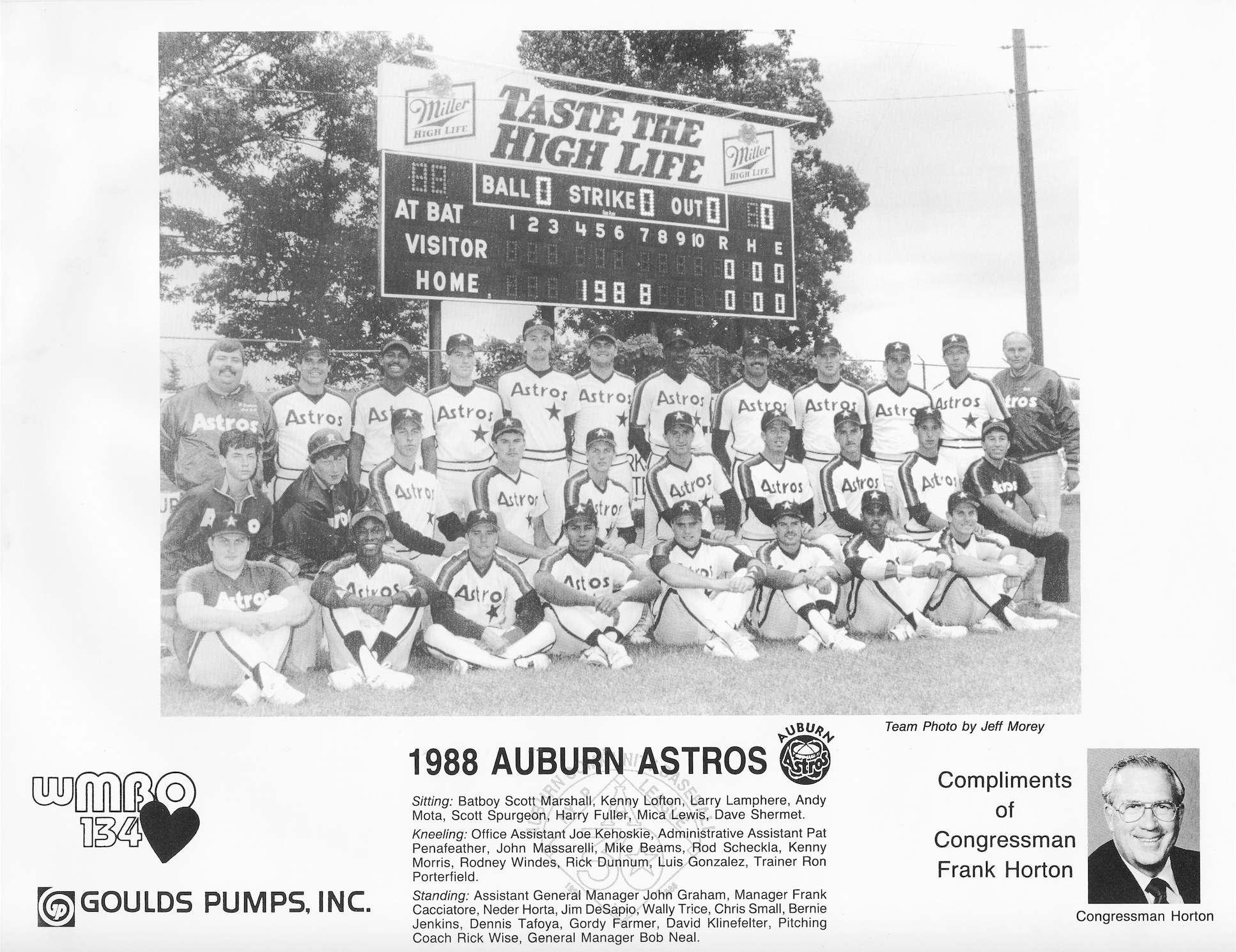
1988 Auburn Astros team photo

Wise was the pitching coach for the 1985 and 1986 Madison Muskies, who were a Single A affiliate of the Oakland A's. Wise was the pitching coach of the Single-A Auburn Astros of the New York–Penn League in 1988 and 1989. Wise was a coach for the 1991 New Britain Red Sox squad of the Eastern League. Wise was the pitching coach for the Lancaster Barnstormers in 2005, helping them to an Atlantic League championship in 2006. He was promoted to interim manager in July 2007 after the organization fired manager Frank Klebe. He returned to his duties as pitching coach after Von Hayes was named the new manager for 2008. After the 2008 season ended, Wise retired from coaching.

== See also ==
- List of Major League Baseball no-hitters
- List of Major League Baseball all-time leaders in home runs by pitchers

Preceded by Ken Holtzman	No-hitter pitcher June 23, 1971	Succeeded by Bob Gibson
