= Dick Drago =

American baseball player (1945–2023)

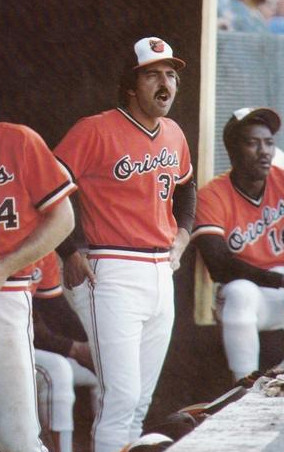
- Drago in 1977
- Pitcher
- Born: June 25, 1945; Toledo, Ohio, U.S.
- Died: November 2, 2023 (aged 78); Tampa, Florida, U.S.
- Batted: Right Threw: Right

MLB debut
- April 11, 1969, for the Kansas City Royals

Last MLB appearance
- September 30, 1981, for the Seattle Mariners

MLB statistics
- Win–loss record: 108–117
- Earned run average: 3.62
- Strikeouts: 987
- Stats at Baseball Reference

Teams
- Kansas City Royals (1969–1973); Boston Red Sox (1974–1975); California Angels (1976–1977); Baltimore Orioles (1977); Boston Red Sox (1978–1980); Seattle Mariners (1981)

Richard Anthony Drago (/ˈdreɪɡoʊ/ DRAY-goh; June 25, 1945 – November 2, 2023) was an American relief pitcher in Major League Baseball who played for the Kansas City Royals (1969–1973), Boston Red Sox (1974–1975, 1978–1980), California Angels (1976–1977), Baltimore Orioles (1977), and Seattle Mariners (1981). He batted and threw right-handed. Drago is notable for being the final pitcher to give up a home run to Hank Aaron.

== Career ==
Drago played high school ball for Woodward High School in Toledo, Ohio, graduating in 1963.

He was originally signed by the Detroit Tigers in the 1964 amateur draft, though was selected by the Kansas City Royals during the 1968 expansion draft and started his Major League career with the Royals in 1969, becoming the ace of their pitching staff in 1971, after going 17–11 with a 2.98 earned run average (ERA), and ending fifth in the AL Cy Young Award vote behind Vida Blue, Mickey Lolich, Wilbur Wood and Dave McNally. Finishing with a 3.01 ERA in 1972, Drago went 12–17, but declined with 12–14 and 4.23 in 1973. He was traded by the Royals to the Red Sox for Marty Pattin on October 24, 1973,

Drago also pitched for the Angels and Orioles in parts of two seasons.

He had been acquired by the Orioles from the Angels for Dyar Miller on June 13, 1977.

He filed for free agency after his lone season with the Orioles. He returned to Boston after signing with the Red Sox on November 21, 1977. During his last three years with the Red Sox, he saved 13 games with a 10–6 record in 1979. He ended his major league career with Seattle in 1981.

On July 20, 1976, Drago gave up the last of Hank Aaron's then-major league record 755 career home runs. In a 13-season career, Drago posted a 108–117 record with a 3.62 ERA and 58 saves in 519 appearances (189 as a starter).

== Death ==
Drago died on November 2, 2023, at the age of 78.
