= Ted Cox (baseball) =

American baseball player (1955–2020)

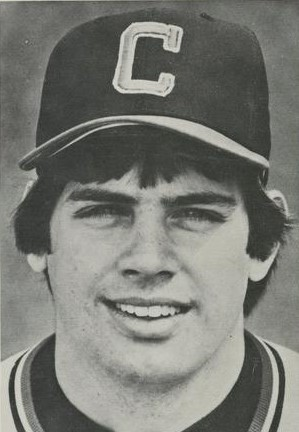
- Third baseman
- Born: January 24, 1955; Oklahoma City, Oklahoma, U.S.
- Died: March 11, 2020 (aged 65); Midwest City, Oklahoma, U.S.
- Batted: Right Threw: Right

MLB debut
- September 18, 1977, for the Boston Red Sox

Last MLB appearance
- October 4, 1981, for the Toronto Blue Jays

MLB statistics
- Batting average: .245
- Home runs: 10
- Runs batted in: 79
- Stats at Baseball Reference

Teams
- Boston Red Sox (1977); Cleveland Indians (1978–1979); Seattle Mariners (1980); Toronto Blue Jays (1981)

William “Ted” Cox (January 24, 1955 – March 11, 2020) was an American third baseman who played Major League Baseball from 1977 through 1981 for the Boston Red Sox (1977), Cleveland Indians (1978–1979), Seattle Mariners (1980) and Toronto Blue Jays (1981). He batted and threw right-handed.

== Career ==
Cox was selected by the Red Sox with the seventeenth pick in the first round of the 1973 draft, ahead of Fred Lynn. Listed at 6' 3", 195 lb., Cox played five years in the Boston minor league system, stepping up a class every year, that was hastened by a phenomenal season in 1977 with Triple-A Pawtucket Red Sox. In 95 games, he hit .334 with 14 home runs and 81 RBI, which was highlighted by an All-Star selection, helping Pawtucket to clinch the regular season championship. After the season, he won both the Topps Minor League Player of the Year and the International League MVP awards, and was recalled by Boston in September 1977.

Cox debuted with the Red Sox on September 18, on Thanks Brooks Robinson Day at Baltimore. Cox went 4 for 4 plus a walk in his first major league game, a 10–4 Boston victory over the Orioles. After the game, reporters told Cox he had tied the American League record for most hits in a first game. Casey Stengel, Willie McCovey and Mack Jones also share the mark. Boston returned to Fenway Park to face the New York Yankees the next day. In his first at-bat against the Yankees, Cox hit a single to tie a record set in 1933 by Cecil Travis of the Washington Senators, of five consecutive hits at the start of a major league career. Then, in his second at-bat Cox singled off Ed Figueroa, giving him a 6 for 6 hitting streak.

Cox ended 1977 with a .362 average (21 for 58), and drew considerable attention to himself. Before the 1978 season he was traded by Boston along with Bo Díaz, Mike Paxton, and Rick Wise to the Cleveland Indians for Dennis Eckersley and Fred Kendall. After two years in Cleveland as a backup outfielder and playing all four infield positions, Cox joined the Seattle Mariners in 1980 and the Toronto Blue Jays in 1981, his last major league season.

In a five-season career, Cox was a .245 hitter with 10 home runs and 79 RBI in 272 games. On April 9, 1980, Cox became the first player in American League history to collect a game-winning RBI, a statistic that was official only from 1980 to 1988.

== Later life ==
After his playing career, Cox operated Grand Slam batting cages in Oklahoma City. In addition he was Oklahoma baseball director for the United States Specialty Sports Association. He was also an assistant baseball coach at Midwest City High School and Oklahoma City University. Cox worked with the Major League Baseball Players Alumni Association to raise money for charities and civic causes.

== Death ==
In November 2019, Cox was diagnosed with multiple myeloma. He died in Midwest City, Oklahoma, on March 11, 2020. Cox was survived by his mother Ernestine, wife Debbie (Pulliam) Cox and sons Billy and Joey.
