= Mike Paxton =

American baseball player (born 1953)

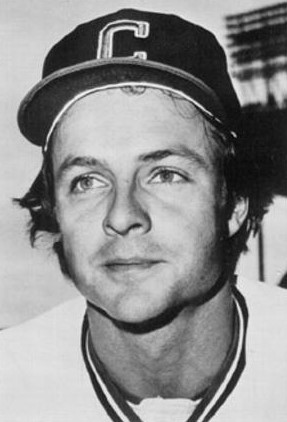
- Pitcher
- Born: September 3, 1953 (age 72); Memphis, Tennessee, U.S.
- Batted: Right Threw: Right

MLB debut
- May 25, 1977, for the Boston Red Sox

Last MLB appearance
- May 3, 1980, for the Cleveland Indians

MLB statistics
- Win–loss record: 30–24
- Earned run average: 4.71
- Strikeouts: 230
- Stats at Baseball Reference

Teams
- Boston Red Sox (1977); Cleveland Indians (1978–1980)

Michael De Wayne Paxton (born September 3, 1953) is an American former Major League Baseball starting pitcher. He batted and threw right-handed.

Paxton was drafted out of Oakhaven High School in Memphis by the New York Yankees in the 1971 Major League Baseball draft, but did not sign, choosing instead to attend Memphis State. After four seasons with the Memphis Tigers, in which he was a four-year letter winner under head coach Bobby Kilpatrick, Paxton was drafted by the Boston Red Sox in the 1975 Major League Baseball draft.

He debuted with the Red Sox on May 25, 1977, starting the second game of a doubleheader with the Minnesota Twins, as he pitched 2.1 innings to take the loss. For the season, Paxton went 10-5 with a 3.83 earned run average and 58 strikeouts splitting his time as a starter, and out of the bullpen.

Following his only season with the BoSox, Paxton was dealt to the Cleveland Indians with Ted Cox, Bo Díaz and Rick Wise for Dennis Eckersley and Fred Kendall. His most productive season came in 1978 with Cleveland, when he recorded career-highs in wins (12), strikeouts (96), ERA (3.86), shutouts (2), complete games (5) and innings pitched (191.0). On April 8, 1978, Paxton recorded the only save of his MLB career. Surprisingly, it came on opening day of the 1978 season. The Indians defeated the Royals 8-5 and Paxton pitched the final three innings of the game, preserving the win for starting pitcher Wayne Garland. On July 21, 1978, Paxton struck out four batters in the fifth inning of an 11–0 win over the Seattle Mariners.

Paxton was in the Indians' starting rotation again in 1979. After playing in four games for the Indians in 1980, he spent most of 1980 and all of 1981 in the minors before retiring.

== See also ==
- List of Major League Baseball single-inning strikeout leaders
