= Steve Foucault =

American baseball player (born 1949)

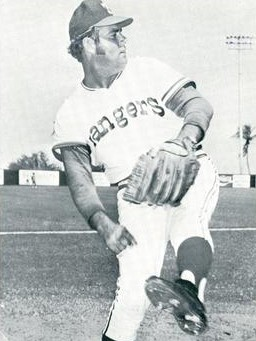
- Pitcher
- Born: October 3, 1949 (age 76); Duluth, Minnesota, U.S.
- Batted: Left Threw: Right

MLB debut
- April 7, 1973, for the Texas Rangers

Last MLB appearance
- August 29, 1978, for the Kansas City Royals

MLB statistics
- Win–loss record: 35–36
- Earned run average: 3.21
- Strikeouts: 307
- Saves: 52
- Stats at Baseball Reference

Teams
- Texas Rangers (1973–1976); Detroit Tigers (1977–1978); Kansas City Royals (1978)

Steven Raymond Foucault (born October 3, 1949) is an American former Major League Baseball pitcher from 1973 to 1978 for the Texas Rangers, Detroit Tigers, and Kansas City Royals. Foucault attended Miami Coral Park Senior High and South Georgia College He was traded from the Rangers to the Tigers for Willie Horton on April 12, 1977.

For his career, he compiled a 35–36 record, with a 3.21 ERA, 307 strikeouts and 52 saves in 277 appearances. In 2007 Foucault was hired as pitching coach for the Newark Bears of the independent Atlantic League, helping lead the team to the 2007 Atlantic League championship. In 2009–10 he was the pitching coach for the Evansville Otters. Later he was the pitching coach for the Long Island Ducks.

For a period of time in the 1980s he was a police officer in Arlington, Texas.

Steven Foucault's parents are Betty J. Foucault and Raymond Foucault.
