= Tom Burgmeier =

American baseball player (born 1943)

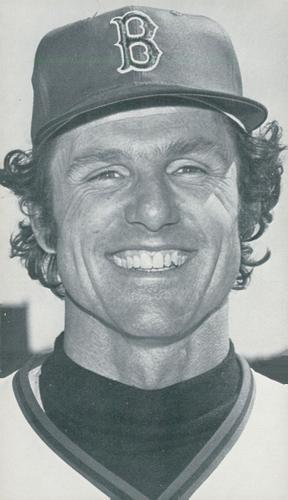
- Pitcher
- Born: August 2, 1943 (age 82); Saint Paul, Minnesota, U.S.
- Batted: Left Threw: Left

MLB debut
- April 10, 1968, for the California Angels

Last MLB appearance
- August 29, 1984, for the Oakland Athletics

MLB statistics
- Win–loss record: 79–55
- Earned run average: 3.23
- Strikeouts: 584
- Saves: 102
- Stats at Baseball Reference

Teams
- California Angels (1968); Kansas City Royals (1969–1973); Minnesota Twins (1974–1977); Boston Red Sox (1978–1982); Oakland Athletics (1983–1984)

Career highlights and awards
- All-Star (1980)

Thomas Henry Burgmeier (born August 2, 1943) is an American former Major League Baseball relief pitcher who played for the California Angels, Kansas City Royals, Minnesota Twins, Boston Red Sox and Oakland A's from 1968 to 1984. He has also served as the pitching coach of the Omaha Royals.

Born in St. Paul, Minnesota, Burgmeier grew up in St. Cloud, Minnesota and attended Cathedral High School.

Burgmeier was selected to the American League All-Star team in 1980.

On August 3, 1980, while playing for the Boston Red Sox, Burgmeier moved from the pitcher's mound to left field with two outs in the bottom of the ninth inning. Skip Lockwood replaced Burgmeier on the mound and retired the final batter to save a 6–4 win over the Texas Rangers. Manager Don Zimmer elected to keep Burgmeier in the game in case the batter got on base—in which case Burgmeier would have returned to the mound to face Mickey Rivers.
