= Jim Wright (1970s pitcher) =

American baseball player (born 1950)

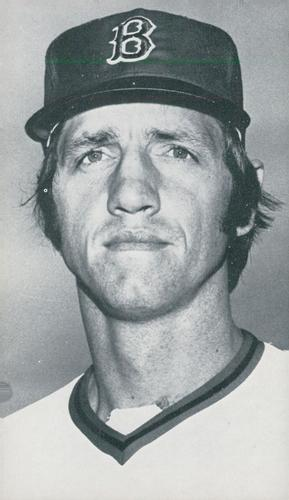
- Pitcher
- Born: December 21, 1950 (age 75); Reed City, Michigan, U.S.
- Batted: Right Threw: Right

MLB debut
- April 15, 1978, for the Boston Red Sox

Last MLB appearance
- June 6, 1979, for the Boston Red Sox

MLB statistics
- Win–loss record: 9–4
- Earned run average: 3.82
- Strikeouts: 71
- Stats at Baseball Reference

Teams
- Boston Red Sox (1978–1979)

James Clifton Wright (born December 21, 1950) is an American former professional baseball pitcher. He played two seasons in Major League Baseball for the Boston Red Sox in 1978-79. Wright was born in Reed City, Michigan.

== Career ==
Wright was drafted out of high school by the Red Sox in the fourth round of the 1969 Major League Baseball draft. He spent several years working his way up through their minor league organization, primarily as a starting pitcher. His breakthrough came in 1977 with the Triple-A Pawtucket Red Sox, where he went 12-8 with a 2.94 ERA.

Wright made the Red Sox out of spring training in 1978 and went on to pitch 3 shutouts in 24 games (16 of them starts) as a rookie. He posted an 8-4 win–loss record with an ERA of 3.57 by the end of the season. As a fielder, Wright committed one error in 17 total chances.

Wright pitched six shutout innings in his first start of 1979. However, it wound up as his only start of the year, as he was moved to the bullpen to make room in the rotation for rookie Chuck Rainey. He did not pitch at all after an arm injury in early June, playing his final game on June 6. He finished with a record of 1-0 and an ERA of 5.09. He also committed no errors that season.

In 1980, Wright returned to the minor leagues, pitching for Pawtucket. He finished his professional career spending the 1981-82 seasons in the Toronto Blue Jays organization with the Syracuse Chiefs.
