= Bill Campbell (baseball) =

American baseball player (1948–2023)

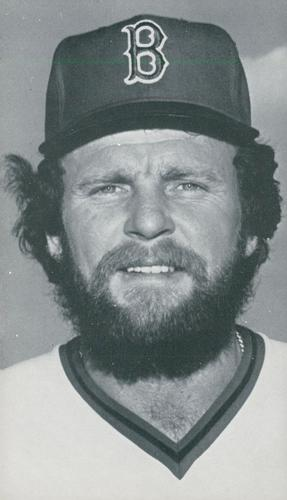
- Pitcher
- Born: August 9, 1948; Highland Park, Michigan, U.S.
- Died: January 6, 2023 (aged 74); Palatine, Illinois, U.S.
- Batted: Right Threw: Right

MLB debut
- July 14, 1973, for the Minnesota Twins

Last MLB appearance
- April 30, 1987, for the Montreal Expos

MLB statistics
- Win–loss record: 83–68
- Earned run average: 3.54
- Strikeouts: 864
- Saves: 126
- Stats at Baseball Reference

Teams
- Minnesota Twins (1973–1976); Boston Red Sox (1977–1981); Chicago Cubs (1982–1983); Philadelphia Phillies (1984); St. Louis Cardinals (1985); Detroit Tigers (1986); Montreal Expos (1987)

Career highlights and awards
- All-Star (1977); 2× AL Rolaids Relief Man Award (1976, 1977); AL saves leader (1977)

William Richard Campbell (August 9, 1948 – January 6, 2023) was an American professional baseball pitcher who played in Major League Baseball (MLB) from 1973 to 1987. He played for the American League (AL) Minnesota Twins, Boston Red Sox, and Detroit Tigers and the National League (NL) Chicago Cubs, Philadelphia Phillies, St. Louis Cardinals, and Montreal Expos.

== Early life ==
Campbell was born in Highland Park, Michigan, and raised in Pomona, California. He graduated from Ganesha High School in Pomona, and attended Mt. San Antonio College.

After being drafted for military service in 1968, Campbell joined the United States Army. He served as a radio operator in Vietnam during the Vietnam War and was discharged in 1970.

== Start of career ==
Nicknamed "Soup" after the Campbell Soup Company, Campbell was signed as an amateur free agent pitcher by the Twins and began his career with the Class A minor league Wisconsin Rapids in 1971. In 1972, he moved up to Minnesota's AA level Charlotte affiliate, and in 1973 he started the season with AAA Tacoma and had 10 wins and 5 losses when he was called up to the major leagues in July.

Campbell made his Twins debut on July 14, 1973, in relief of Jim Kaat. He pitched one scoreless inning, and allowed one hit to the Cleveland Indians, while striking out two. Used primarily in relief, he posted a record in 1973 of 3 wins and 3 losses in 28 games, with an earned run average of 3.18. In 1974, Campbell pitched in 63 games, all in relief, and compiled an 8–7 record with 19 saves and a 2.62 ERA. In 1975, he started slowly after a spring training arm injury, and split time between relieving and starting. His overall record was 4 wins and 6 losses, with 5 saves and a 3.79 ERA. In 1976, new manager Gene Mauch named Campbell as his closer. Campbell rose to the occasion; his 78 appearances led the league, and his record was 17 wins, 5 losses, 20 saves, and a 3.01 ERA. He finished 7th in the voting for that year's Cy Young Award, and 8th in the voting for Most Valuable Player.

Campbell became a free agent after the 1976 season and signed a four-year contract with the Boston Red Sox. He finished with 13 wins, 9 losses, 31 saves, and an ERA of 2.96. He was selected for the AL All-Star team, and won both the AL Fireman of the Year (awarded by The Sporting News) and Rolaids Relief Man of the Year Award. Campbell was the first American league recipient of the Rolaids award, and the first two-time winner. Campbell experienced arm trouble in 1978, and was no longer the dominating closer he had been in 1976 and 1977.

On March 26, 1984, the Cubs traded Campbell and Mike Diaz to the Philadelphia Phillies for Gary Matthews, Porfi Altamirano, and Bob Dernier. On April 6, 1985, the Phillies traded Campbell and Iván DeJesús to the St. Louis Cardinals for Dave Rucker. He was released by the Cardinals after the 1985 season and signed with the Detroit Tigers for the 1986 season. He signed with the Montreal Expos for the 1987 season, but was released on May 1.

== Later life and death ==
After leaving the major leagues, Campbell spent two seasons with the Senior Professional Baseball Association. According to 1987 news articles, Campbell was among those who were swindled by sports agent LaRue Harcourt, and lost approximately $800,000. He remained involved in baseball, and served on the coaching staff of the Milwaukee Brewers in 1999. In retirement, he was a resident of the Chicago area. He also coached for the Red Sox organization and was a volunteer coach for youth baseball leagues.

Campbell died from cancer under hospice care in Palatine, Illinois, on January 6, 2023, at the age of 74.

== See also ==
- List of Major League Baseball annual saves leaders
