= Bob Stanley (baseball) =

American baseball player (born 1954)

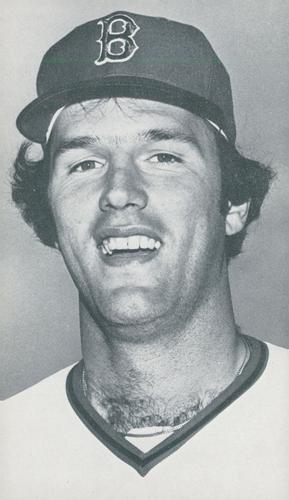
- Pitcher
- Born: November 10, 1954 (age 71); Portland, Maine, U.S.
- Batted: Right Threw: Right

MLB debut
- April 16, 1977, for the Boston Red Sox

Last MLB appearance
- September 5, 1989, for the Boston Red Sox

MLB statistics
- Win–loss record: 115–97
- Earned run average: 3.64
- Strikeouts: 693
- Saves: 132
- Stats at Baseball Reference

Teams
- Boston Red Sox (1977–1989)

Career highlights and awards
- 2× All-Star (1979, 1983); Boston Red Sox Hall of Fame

Robert William Stanley (born November 10, 1954) is an American former professional baseball relief pitcher who spent his entire Major League Baseball (MLB) career with the Boston Red Sox. He was later the pitching coach for the Buffalo Bisons, Triple-A affiliate of the Toronto Blue Jays, through the 2018 season.

== Early life ==
Stanley attended Kearny High School in Kearny, New Jersey, where he earned all-state honors as a pitcher-shortstop; he came within three outs of pitching a perfect game in May 1973 against Bloomfield High School.

== Playing career ==
Stanley was selected by the Los Angeles Dodgers in the ninth round of the June 1973 MLB draft, but did not sign with the team, choosing instead to attend college. During this era, another draft was held in the winter; Stanley was selected by the Boston Red Sox in the first round of the January 1974 secondary draft, and this time elected to sign. He began his professional career with the Elmira Pioneers in 1974, spent 1975 with the Winter Haven Red Sox, and advanced to the Bristol Red Sox at the Double-A level in 1976. Stanley made his major league debut with the Red Sox on April 16, 1977.

Stanley was named an All-Star in 1979, a year in which he pitched in 40 games (30 starts). He won 16 games and lost 12, with an earned run average (ERA) of 3.99. Following two more seasons of mixed usage, Stanley was deployed as a full-time relief pitcher in 1982, maintaining a 3.10 ERA over 168 1/3 innings pitched. As of the beginning of the 2022 season, this remains the American League record for innings pitched by a relief pitcher. While he was not named to the All-Star team, Stanley was recognized with down-ballot votes for the Cy Young and Most Valuable Player awards. He was named to his second All-Star team the following season, 1983, appearing in 64 games and pitching 145 1/3 innings, while recording 33 saves and a 2.85 ERA, and he remained a fixture of the Red Sox bullpen in the years which followed.

Stanley was a key member of the 1986 Red Sox team that came within one strike of winning the World Series but ultimately fell to the New York Mets in seven games. Stanley entered Game 6 with the Red Sox one out away from clinching their first World Series since 1918, holding a one-run lead with runners on first and third. Stanley threw a wild pitch to Mookie Wilson which allowed Kevin Mitchell to score the tying run and Ray Knight to move to second base, putting him in position to score the winning run on Bill Buckner's fielding error. Stanley and the Red Sox returned to Shea Stadium for Game 7, which the New York Mets won by a score of 8–5.

In 1987, Stanley was converted to a regular starting pitcher for the first time since 1979, compiling a 4–15 record with 67 strikeouts and a 5.01 ERA. After returning to the bullpen to pitch two more seasons as a reliever, Stanley announced his retirement on September 25, 1989. In a 13-year career spent entirely with the Red Sox, he compiled a 115–97 win–loss record with 693 strikeouts, a 3.64 ERA, 21 complete games, seven shutouts, 132 saves, and 1707 innings pitched in 637 games (85 as a starter).

A sinker ball specialist, Stanley is the Red Sox all-time leader in appearances and relief wins, and was inducted to the Red Sox Hall of Fame in 2000. Stanley was also the team's all-time saves leader, a record he held for 20 years, until Jonathan Papelbon tied him on June 29, 2009, and then passed him on July 1, 2009. Stanley is the first, and to date only, player born in Maine to be named to an MLB All-Star Game.

== Coaching career ==
Prior to joining the Blue Jays, Stanley served as a minor league pitching coach in the New York Mets' and San Francisco Giants' organizations, including service with the Connecticut Defenders, the Giants' Double-A Eastern League affiliate.

On December 23, 2011, Stanley was announced as the pitching coach for the Blue Jays' Triple-A affiliate, the Las Vegas 51s. On January 7, 2013, Toronto announced that Stanley would be the pitching coach for their new Triple-A farm club, the Buffalo Bisons.

Almost a year later, on January 4, 2014, the Blue Jays announced that Stanley would be replacing Pat Hentgen as their bullpen coach. On December 19, Stanley was named the pitching coach for the Double-A New Hampshire Fisher Cats. On January 19, 2016, Stanley was announced as returning to the Buffalo Bisons. Stanley was confirmed to return for a third season as the Bisons' pitching coach on January 19, 2017.

== Personal ==
During his career, Stanley earned the nicknames "the Steamer" and "Bigfoot." He lives in the Seacoast region of southern New Hampshire. On April 4, 2011, he was named President of the Seacoast Mavericks of the Futures Collegiate Baseball League (FCBL). On June 10, 2011, Stanley threw out the first pitch to inaugurate the Martha's Vineyard Sharks of the FCBL.

== Highlights ==
- Two-time All-Star (1979, 1983)
- Two-time Top 10 in Cy Young Award voting (7th, 1978; 7th, 1982)
- Three-times led MLB in relief innings (1981–1983)
- Set an American League record in relief innings (168 1/3, 1982)
- On May 22, 1983, Stanley became the most recent MLB player to pitch 10 or more innings in relief.

== See also ==
- Boston Red Sox Hall of Fame
- 1986 World Series
- List of Major League Baseball players who spent their entire career with one franchise

Preceded by Pat Hentgen	Toronto Blue Jays bullpen coach 2014	Succeeded by Dane Johnson
