= List of Milwaukee Brewers owners and executives =

The Milwaukee Brewers Major League Baseball (MLB) franchise of the National League has employed 19 managers and 10 general managers (GMs) during its 50 seasons of play. The general manager controls player transactions, hiring and firing of the coaching staff, and negotiates with players and agents regarding contracts.

== Owners ==
- William R. Daley & Dewey Soriano
- Bud Selig
- Wendy Selig-Prieb
- Mark Attanasio
- Robert D. Beyer
- Antony Ressler
- Giannis Antetokounmpo

== General managers ==
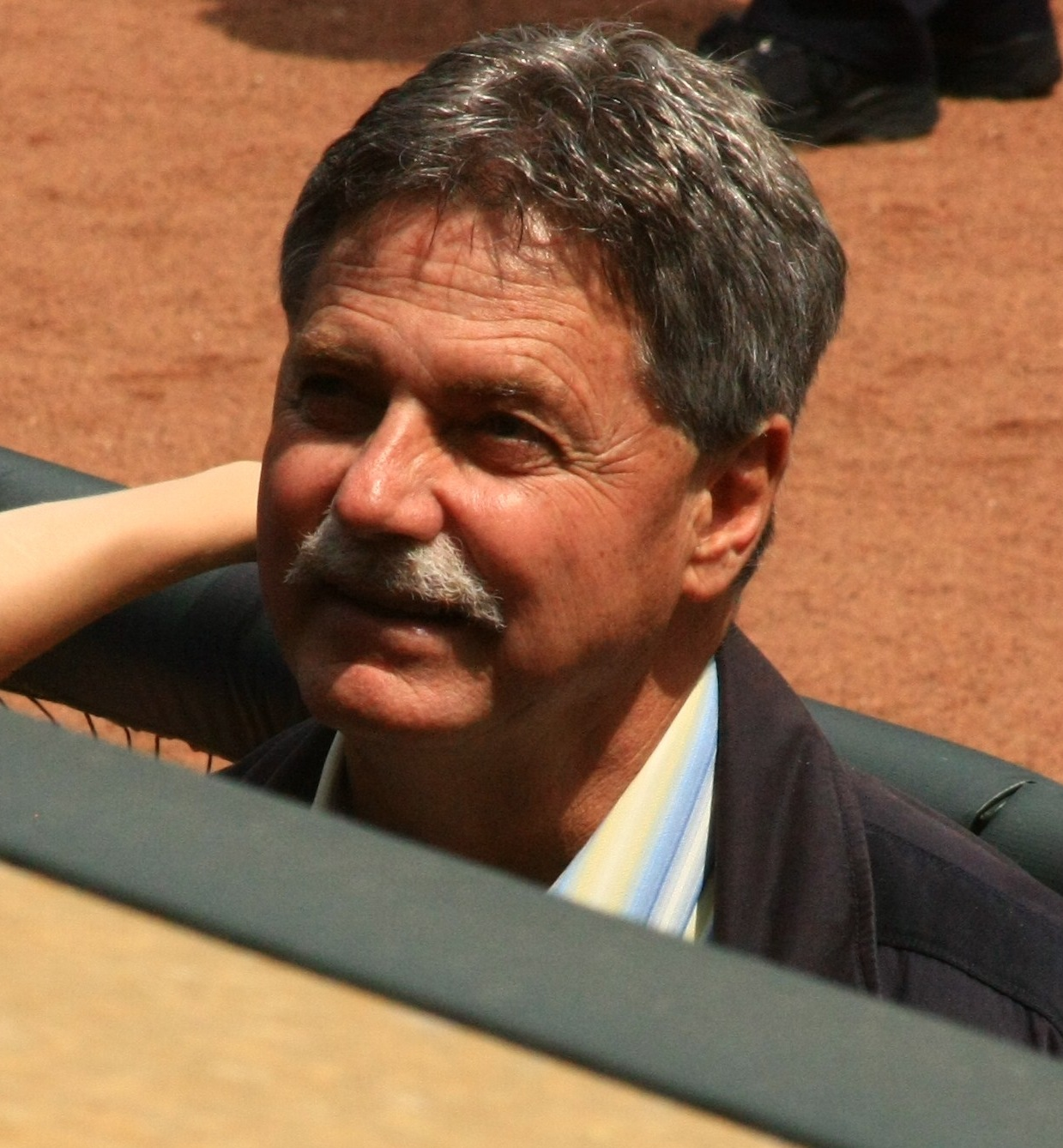
Doug Melvin, Brewers general manager from 2002 to 2015

Key
No.	A running total of the number of Brewers general managers
Season(s)	The first and last seasons the general manager led the team. Each year is linked to an article about that particular team season.
†	Member of the Milwaukee Brewers Wall of Honor
‡	Member of the American Family Field Walk of Fame

General managers
No.	General manager	Seasons
1	Marvin Milkes	1969–1971
2	Frank Lane	1971–1972
3	Jim Wilson	1972–1974
4	Jim Baumer	1974–1977
5	Harry Dalton^{†‡}	1977–1991
6	Sal Bando^{†}	1991–1999
7	Dean Taylor	1999–2002
8	Doug Melvin^{†}	2002–2015
9	David Stearns	2015–2021
10	Matt Arnold	2021–present

== Other executives ==
- Gord Ash
- Robert C. Cannon
- Larry Haney
- Bill Lajoie
- Reid Nichols
- Dan O'Brien
- Laurel Prieb
- Bill Veeck
