= Cecil Cooper =

American baseball player and manager (born 1949)

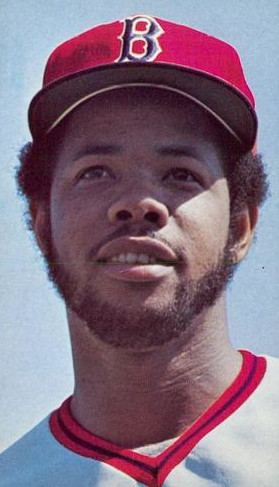
- Cooper with the Boston Red Sox in 1976
- First baseman / Manager
- Born: December 20, 1949 (age 76); Brenham, Texas, U.S.
- Batted: Left Threw: Left

MLB debut
- September 8, 1971, for the Boston Red Sox

Last MLB appearance
- July 12, 1987, for the Milwaukee Brewers

MLB statistics
- Batting average: .298
- Hits: 2,192
- Home runs: 241
- Runs batted in: 1,125
- Managerial record: 171–170
- Winning %: .501
- Stats at Baseball Reference
- Managerial record at Baseball Reference

Teams
- As player: Boston Red Sox (1971–1976); Milwaukee Brewers (1977–1987); As manager: Houston Astros (2007–2009); As coach: Milwaukee Brewers (2002); Houston Astros (2005–2007)

Career highlights and awards
- 5× All-Star (1979, 1980, 1982, 1983, 1985); 2× Gold Glove Award (1979, 1980); 3× Silver Slugger Award (1980–1982); Roberto Clemente Award (1983); 2× AL RBI leader (1980, 1983); Milwaukee Brewers Wall of Honor; American Family Field Walk of Fame

Cecil Celester Cooper (born December 20, 1949) is an American former professional baseball player, coach, manager and sports agent. He played in Major League Baseball (MLB) as a first baseman from 1971 to 1987 for the Boston Red Sox and the Milwaukee Brewers. Cooper was a member of the Red Sox team that won the 1975 American League pennant but he rose to prominence as a member of the Brewers, where he became a five-time American League All-Star player and a two-time American League RBI champion.

During his playing career, the left-handed hitting Cooper accumulated a .298 batting average and won three Silver Slugger Awards as well as two Gold Glove Awards. He reached the World Series in 1975 with the Red Sox and 1982 with the Brewers however, neither team was victorious. In 1983, Cooper was named the recipient of the prestigious Roberto Clemente Award.

After his athletic career, he became a sports agent before returning to work for the Brewers as a coach and minor league manager. He was the manager for the Houston Astros from 2007 to 2009. Cooper was inducted into the Milwaukee Brewers Walk of Fame in 2002, and the Milwaukee Brewers Wall of Honor in 2014.

== Playing career ==
1982 photo of Cooper for Milwaukee Brewers

Cooper was born in Brenham, Texas, where he attended Brenham High School and later attended Prairie View A&M University in Prairie View, Texas. He was selected by the Boston Red Sox in the 1968 Major League Baseball draft and made his major league debut with the Red Sox in 1972 at the age of 21. On December 6, 1976, before the 1977 season, the Red Sox traded Cooper to the Milwaukee Brewers for George Scott and Bernie Carbo.

After being traded to the Brewers, Cooper altered his batting stance to resemble the stance of Rod Carew, leaning far back on his left foot and his arms partially extended. The stance helped Cooper in hitting outside pitches to the opposite field, while still pulling inside pitches. The stance change was effective, as Cooper batted .302 as a Brewer, compared to the .283 average he had during his time in Boston.

A five-time All-Star, Cooper hit .300 or more from 1977 to 1983. His most productive season came in 1980, when he hit a career-high .352 (finishing second in the American League behind batting champion George Brett's .390 average for the Kansas City Royals), and he also led the league in RBIs (122) and total bases (335).

In 1983 Cooper hit .307 with 30 home runs and a league-leading and career-high 126 RBIs. He also posted three seasons with 200-plus hits, in 1980, 1982 and 1983, finished fifth in the AL MVP vote, and was named the Brewers' team MVP in three seasons (1980, 1982–83). An excellent defensive first baseman, he was a two-time Gold Glove winner (1979–80). He also won the Silver Slugger Award in three straight years (1980–82); the only other Brewer to have done so is Ryan Braun (2008–10).

Cooper concluded his Major League career with 11 seasons as a Brewer, including an appearance in the 1982 World Series. Cooper holds the Milwaukee franchise record for hits (219 in 1980). Cooper held the team record for RBIs in a season with 126 until Prince Fielder broke that record on September 19, 2009, against the Houston Astros, who Cooper was managing at the time. Through 2011 he was one of three Brewers who have had four 100-RBI seasons, along with Prince Fielder and Ryan Braun.

In 1983 he was honored with the Roberto Clemente Award, and in 2002 he was inducted into the Brewers Walk of Fame.

Cooper was released by the Brewers in the middle of the 1987 season. In a 17-season career, Cooper posted a .298 batting average with 2192 hits in 7349 at-bats, 1012 runs, 415 doubles, 241 home runs, 448 bases on balls and 1125 runs batted in in 1896 games.

== Post-playing career ==
"Out of necessity," Cooper began working for his agent. Cooper eventually took on his own clients including Randy Johnson, Wade Boggs and Joe Girardi. After working as an agent for a number of years, Wendy Selig-Prieb recruited Cooper to return to the Brewers to serve as the Director of Player Development or "farm director," a post he held for three years.

He was named bench coach for Milwaukee in 2002 and also managed the Triple-A Indianapolis Indians in 2003–04. He returned to the Major League coaching ranks in 2005 as a bench coach for the Houston Astros.

=== Managing career ===
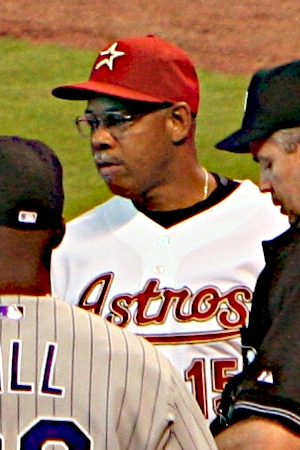
Cooper as coach for the Houston Astros in 2007

On August 27, 2007, he was named the interim manager of the Astros following the firing of Phil Garner, making him the first African American field manager in Astros' history. The Astros were 58–73 at the time Cooper was brought in as manager. Cooper's previous managerial experience was at Class AAA Indianapolis, the Milwaukee Brewers' top farm club. Cooper went 15–16 to close the year for the Astros having a total record of 73–89. On September 28, 2007, Cooper's interim tag was dropped and he became the Astros' 16th manager.

The 2008 team had a series of up and downs. Carlos Lee suffered a broken pinky finger on August 9 that saw him miss the rest of the season. The Astros were 44–51 at the All-Star Break. However, by August 19, the Astros were 64–62 after winning twenty of 31 games to start the second half of the season. They had two different winning streaks of eight games in August. On September 8, they had eighteen games to play and were trailing by five games to Milwaukee for the NL Wild Card, and on the 11th, they had a record of 80–67. The Astros were slated to play games in Houston on September 12 and 13, but Hurricane Ike scuttled those plans, with the resulting decision being that the Astros series against the Chicago Cubs was moved to Miller Park in Milwaukee for September 14–15 (sources later stated that Minnesota, St. Louis, Miami, and Atlanta offered their stadiums as alternate sites). Trailing Milwaukee by 2.5 games with 15 games to play, Carlos Zambrano no-hit the Astros. The Astros lost the second game at Miller Park to fall to 80–69. The Astros would split their final 12 games with a 6–6 record while the Brewers cruised to the Wild Card spot.

Cooper admitted that the hurricane impacted the team, stating "I think it affected us a lot. I don't want to go into it any more. I'm really past that. So if we could go to something else that would be great." At one point, Cooper abruptly ended a postgame interview by banging his hand on a desk, which he later apologized for. In the end, the Astros finished 86–75, four games behind Milwaukee for the final spot (the Astros did not play Game 162 as it was not needed).

Ten games into the 2009 season, Cooper had his option for 2010 picked up. However, Cooper was fired on September 21, 2009, with 13 games remaining in the season while the team was on a seven-game losing streak that dropped them to 70–79.

The team was plagued by a variety of offseason issues and poor play from star players such as Lance Berkman and Roy Oswalt despite having a payroll of $103 million. The Astros finished with their second losing season in three years and only the third since 1991. He finished with a record of 171–170.

== Personal life ==
Cooper was elected to the Wisconsin Athletic Hall of Fame in 2007. He lives now in Katy, Texas with his wife Octavia. He has three adult daughters: Kelly, Brittany and Tori.

== Managerial record ==
Team	Year	Regular season				Postseason			
Team	Year	Won	Lost	Win %	Finish	Won	Lost	Win %	Result
HOU	2007	15	16	.484	4th in NL Central	–	–	–	
HOU	2008	86	75	.534	3rd in NL Central	–	–	–	–
HOU	2009	70	79	.470	4th in NL Central	–	–	–	Fired
Total		171	170	.501					

== See also ==
- List of Major League Baseball annual doubles leaders
- List of Major League Baseball career hits leaders
- List of Major League Baseball career home run leaders
- List of Major League Baseball career doubles leaders
- List of Major League Baseball career runs scored leaders
- List of Major League Baseball career runs batted in leaders
- List of Milwaukee Brewers award winners and All-Stars
- List of Milwaukee Brewers team records
