= Selig v. United States =

1984 US Court of Appeals judgement on amortization of intangible property

- Court: United States Court of Appeals for the Seventh Circuit
- Full case name: Allan H. Selig v. United States of America
- Argued: March 29, 1984
- Decided: July 27, 1984
- Citations: 740 F.2d 572 (7th Cir. 1984); 84-2 USTC (CCH) ¶ 9696; 16 Fed. R. Evid. Serv. 196

Court membership
- Judges sitting: William J. Bauer, John Louis Coffey, Thomas E. Fairchild

Case opinions
- Majority: Bauer, joined by Coffey, Fairchild

Laws applied
- Internal Revenue Code

Keywords
- Amortization; Intangible property

Selig v. United States, 740 F.2d 572 (7th Cir. 1984), is a case decided by the United States Court of Appeals for the Seventh Circuit related to the amortization of intangible property.

Conceptually, amortization is a mechanism that allows taxpayers to recover the cost of property over the life of an asset when they are precluded from taking an immediate and full deduction. Practically, this means that taxpayers may recover the cost in small amounts over time. There are two forms of such recovery: depreciation and amortization. Selig deals with amortization. The general rule for amortization is set forth in Section 197 of the Internal Revenue Code. The Selig case demonstrates some of the practical problems in cost allocation prior to the enactment of Section 197.

== Facts of case ==
Bud Selig was part of an effort to bring a new baseball franchise to Wisconsin. As part-owner of the Milwaukee Brewers, Selig negotiated to purchase an American League team that was in financial difficulty, the Seattle Pilots. The deal was contingent upon the team moving from Seattle to Milwaukee and payment of the purchase price, $10.8 million. The contract allocated the $10.8 million to equipment and supplies, league membership, and player contracts (representing $10.2 million of the $10.8 million). The Brewers' financial officer decided to retain the $10.2 million allocation. Selig then amortized that cost over the players' five-year useful lives under Section 167(a) of the Internal Revenue Code. The IRS disallowed the entire $10.2 million allocation, arguing that the players' contracts had zero value. Selig paid the deficiency amount assessed by the IRS, but subsequently filed a lawsuit.

== Issue ==
The key issue in this case was whether there was proper allocation of the purchase price to the franchise and the cost of the player contracts.

== Procedural history ==
The district court held that Selig properly allocated $10.2 million of the $10.8 million purchase price of the Seattle Pilots to the value of the 149 players that he bought.

On appeal, the government argued that the $10.2 million allocation was "contrary to common sense." The government focused on the specific value of the allocation (i.e. $10.2 million) by attempting to prove that the players were not "worth" $10.2 million.

== Holding ==
The players' contracts were properly valued as a whole (rather than combining individual contract values), and the franchise was not worth more than the purchase price.

== Reasoning ==
At the time of the sale, Milwaukee was not a commercially successful baseball climate. As such, a baseball franchise in Milwaukee was not as valuable as franchises located elsewhere. For this reason, the court determined that the Pilots' franchise was not worth more than Selig claimed. Rather, the key inquiry was the value attributed to the players.

The purchase price of the club itself required allocating that price among all of the club's assets (e.g., equipment, players, league fees), not simply assigning a dollar value to each player (as in the free agent market). This transaction was essentially the bulk purchase of all of the Pilots' players in an arms-length transaction with no restrictions. Because this sort of bulk sale was the reality of the "club" market, the players should be valued in accordance with the market's nature.

== After the case ==
Congress enacted Section 197 of the Internal Revenue Code to clarify disputes and provide rules for amortization (i.e. cost recovery for intangible assets).
