= Robert Beyer =

Robert Beyer may refer to

- Robert D. Beyer (born 1959), American businessman
- Robert T. Beyer (1920–2008), American physicist
