= Intangible property =

Something which a legal person can own but which has no physical substance

Intangible property, also known as incorporeal property, is something that a person or corporation can have ownership of and can transfer ownership to another person or corporation, but has no physical substance, for example brand identity or knowledge/intellectual property.

== Description ==
Intangible property generally refers to statutory creations, such as copyright, trademarks, or patents. It excludes tangible property like real property (land, buildings, and fixtures) and personal property (ships, automobiles, tools, etc.). In some jurisdictions, intangible property are referred to as choses in action. Intangible property is used in distinction to tangible property. It is useful to note that there are two forms of intangible property: legal intangible property (which is discussed here) and competitive intangible property (which is the source from which legal intangible property is created but cannot be owned, extinguished, or transferred). Competitive intangible property disobeys the intellectual property test of voluntary extinguishment and therefore results in the sources that create intellectual property (knowledge in its source form, collaboration, process-engagement, etc.) escaping quantification.

Generally, ownership of intangible property gives the owner a set of legally enforceable rights over reproduction of personal property containing certain content. For example, a copyright owner can control the reproduction of the work forming the copyright. However, the intangible property forms a set of rights separate from the tangible property that carries the rights. For example, the owner of a copyright can control the printing of books containing the content, but the book itself is personal property which can be bought and sold without concern over the rights of the copyright holder.

In English law and other Commonwealth legal systems, intangible property is traditionally divided in pure intangibles (such as debts, intellectual property rights and goodwill) and documentary intangibles, which obtain their character through the medium of a document (such as a bill of lading, promissory note or bill of exchange). The recent rise of electronic documents has blurred the distinction between pure intangibles and documentary intangibles.

== See also ==
- Important Intangible Cultural Properties (disambiguation)
- Industrial property
- Intangible good
- Intellectual property
- Selig v. United States
- Web property
