= Chris Carter (infielder) =

American baseball player (born 1986)

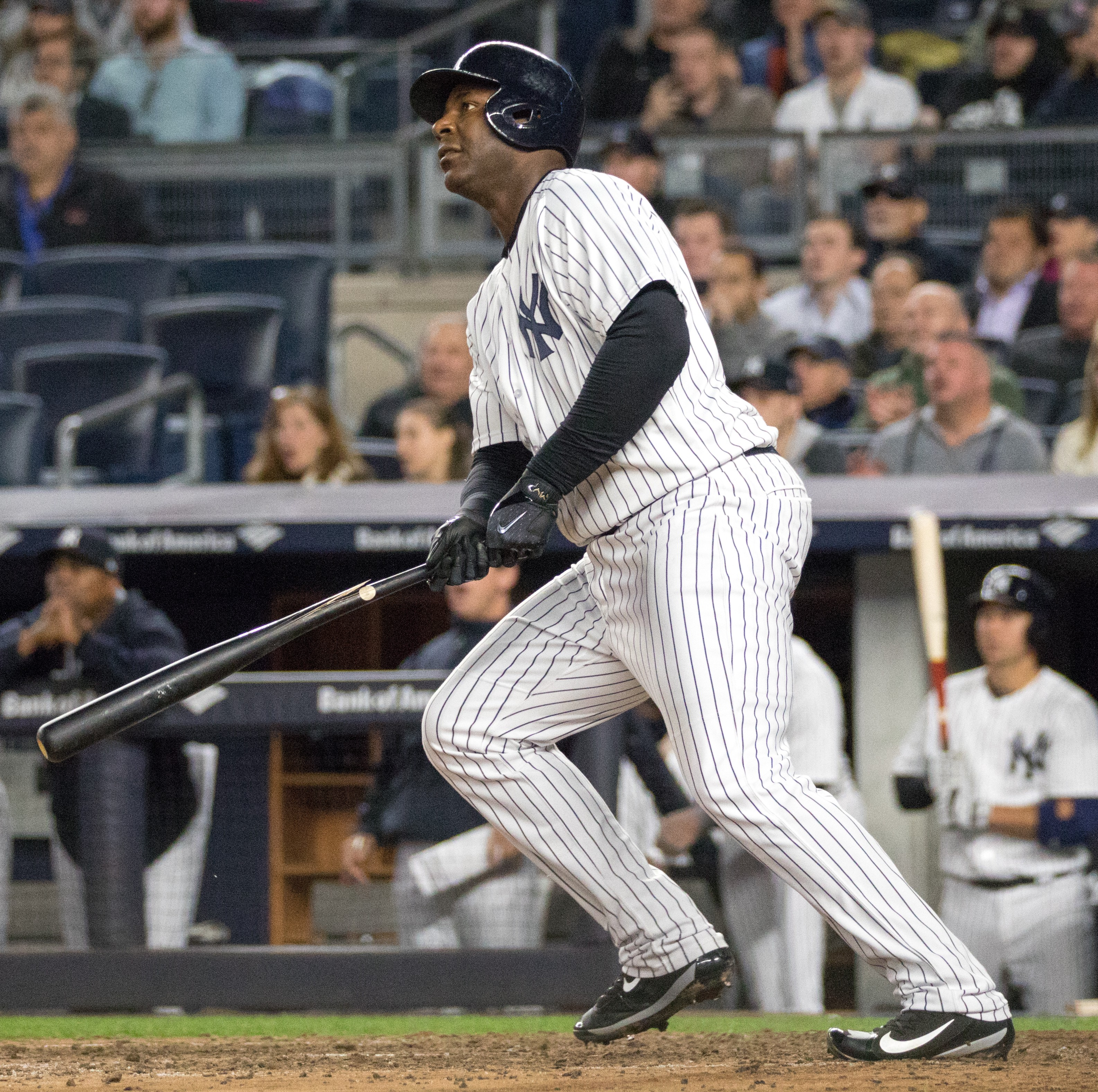
- Carter batting for the New York Yankees in 2017

Saraperos de Saltillo – No. 33
- First baseman / Designated hitter
- Born: December 18, 1986 (age 39); Redwood City, California, U.S.
- Bats: Right Throws: Right

MLB debut
- August 9, 2010, for the Oakland Athletics

MLB statistics (through 2017 season)
- Batting average: .217
- Home runs: 158
- Runs batted in: 400
- Stats at Baseball Reference

Teams
- Oakland Athletics (2010–2012); Houston Astros (2013–2015); Milwaukee Brewers (2016); New York Yankees (2017)

Career highlights and awards
- NL home run leader (2016 (Note: Tied with Nolan Arenado of the Colorado Rockies.))

Vernon Christopher Carter (born December 18, 1986) is an American professional baseball first baseman and designated hitter for the Saraperos de Saltillo of the Mexican League. He previously played in Major League Baseball (MLB) for the Oakland Athletics, Houston Astros, Milwaukee Brewers, and New York Yankees. In 2016, while playing for the Brewers, Carter led the National League in home runs, along with Colorado Rockies third baseman Nolan Arenado, with 41.

In July 2025, playing for the Piratas de Campeche, Carter hit his 500th home run of his professional career.

== Early life ==
Carter was born in Redwood City, California. When he was approximately 7 or 8 years old, his family moved to Las Vegas. He attended Sierra Vista High School. In 2005, Sierra Vista's baseball team won the Nevada Interscholastic Activities Association Class 4A state championship.

== Professional career ==
=== Chicago White Sox ===
Carter was drafted out of high school by the Chicago White Sox in the 15th round of the 2005 Major League Baseball draft. Carter began his professional career with the Bristol White Sox of the Rookie-level Appalachian League in 2005. He hit 10 home runs and had 37 runs batted in (RBI). Carter played for two affiliates in the 2006 season. The affiliates included the Great Falls White Sox of the rookie-level Pioneer League and the Kannapolis Intimidators of the Single-A South Atlantic League. Carter had a combined total of 16 home runs and 63 RBI. He played for Kannapolis in the 2007 season where he hit 25 home runs and had 93 RBI.

On December 3, 2007, the White Sox traded Carter to the Arizona Diamondbacks in exchange for Carlos Quentin.

=== Oakland Athletics (2010–2012) ===
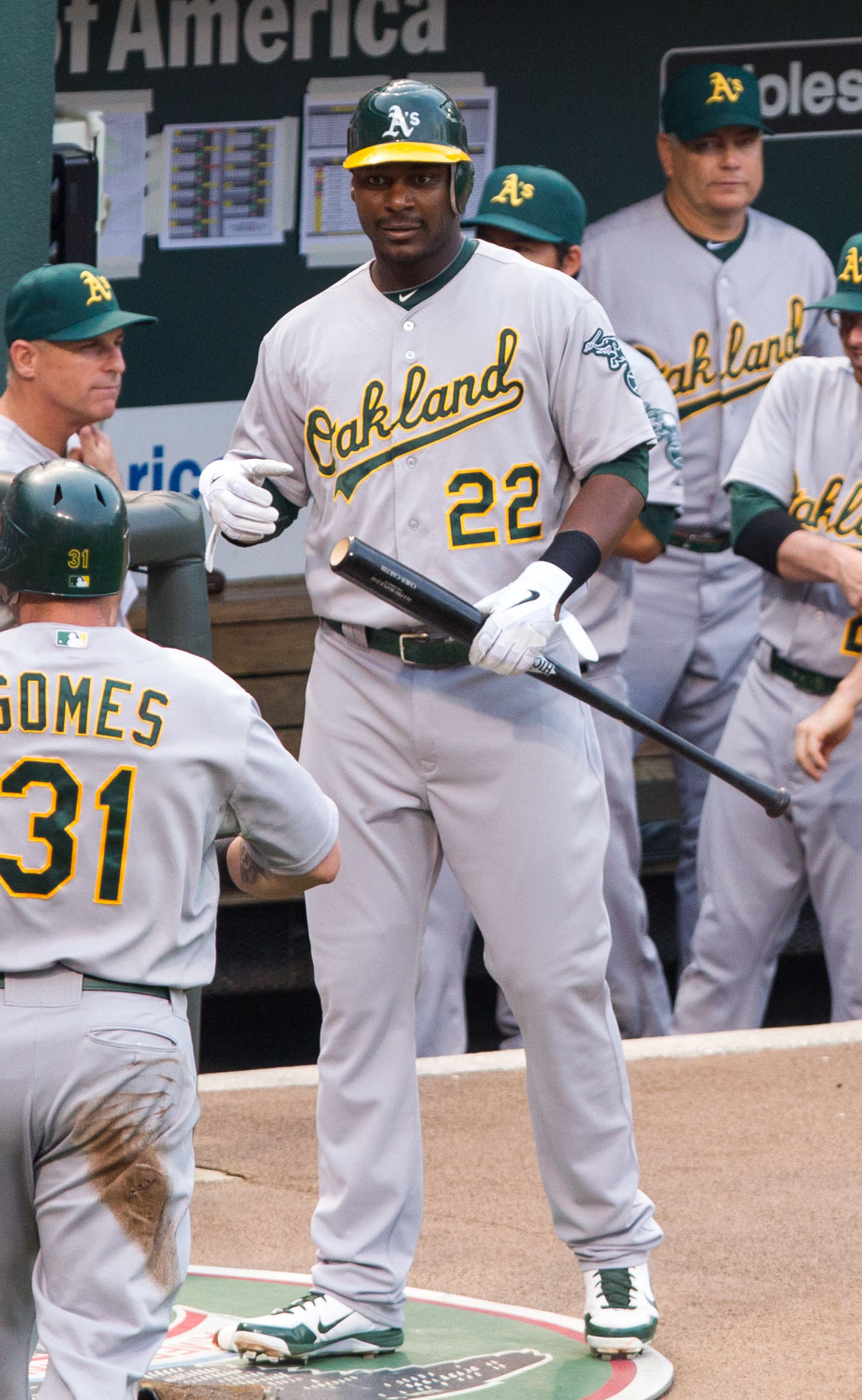
Carter with the Athletics in 2012

On December 14, 2007, the Diamondbacks traded Carter, Carlos González, Brett Anderson, Aaron Cunningham, Greg Smith, and Dana Eveland to the Oakland Athletics in exchange for Dan Haren and Connor Robertson. He played for the Stockton Ports of the High-A California League in the 2008 season where he hit 39 home runs and had 104 RBI. Carter was named the California League Rookie of the Year for the 2008 season. In 2009, Carter split time between the Midland RockHounds of the Double-A Texas League and the Sacramento River Cats of the Triple-A Pacific Coast League (PCL), putting a .329 batting average (a 70-point increase from 2008), 28 homers and 115 RBIs combined. In 2008 and 2009, Baseball America ranked Carter as one of the top 10 prospects in the Athletics' organization. Also in 2008 and 2009, Carter was the Oakland Athletics' Minor League Player of Year.

Carter was placed on the A's 40-man roster on November 20, 2009, in order to be protected from the Rule 5 draft. In 2009, he was named the This Year in Minor League Baseball Awards "Overall Hitter of The Year". On August 9, 2010, Carter was promoted to Oakland and went 0–for–3 in his first game. On August 16, Carter was demoted to Sacramento after starting his career 0–for–19 with 12 strikeouts. After the Triple-A season ended, Carter was recalled to Oakland. On September 20, he snapped his 0–for–33 streak with a single in the sixth inning. On September 22, 2010 Carter hit his first major league home run against the Chicago White Sox.

Carter finished the 2010 season with a .186 batting average across 78 plate appearances and 24 games. He played in the Venezuelan Winter League upon completion of the 2010 season. He hit .136 in 15 MLB games the next year, spending most of that season in the Athletics' minor league system. He also split the 2012 season between MLB and the minor leagues, hitting .239 with 16 home runs and 39 RBI in 67 games.

=== Houston Astros (2013–2015) ===
After the 2012 season, the Athletics traded Carter to the Houston Astros with Brad Peacock and Max Stassi for Jed Lowrie and Fernando Rodriguez.

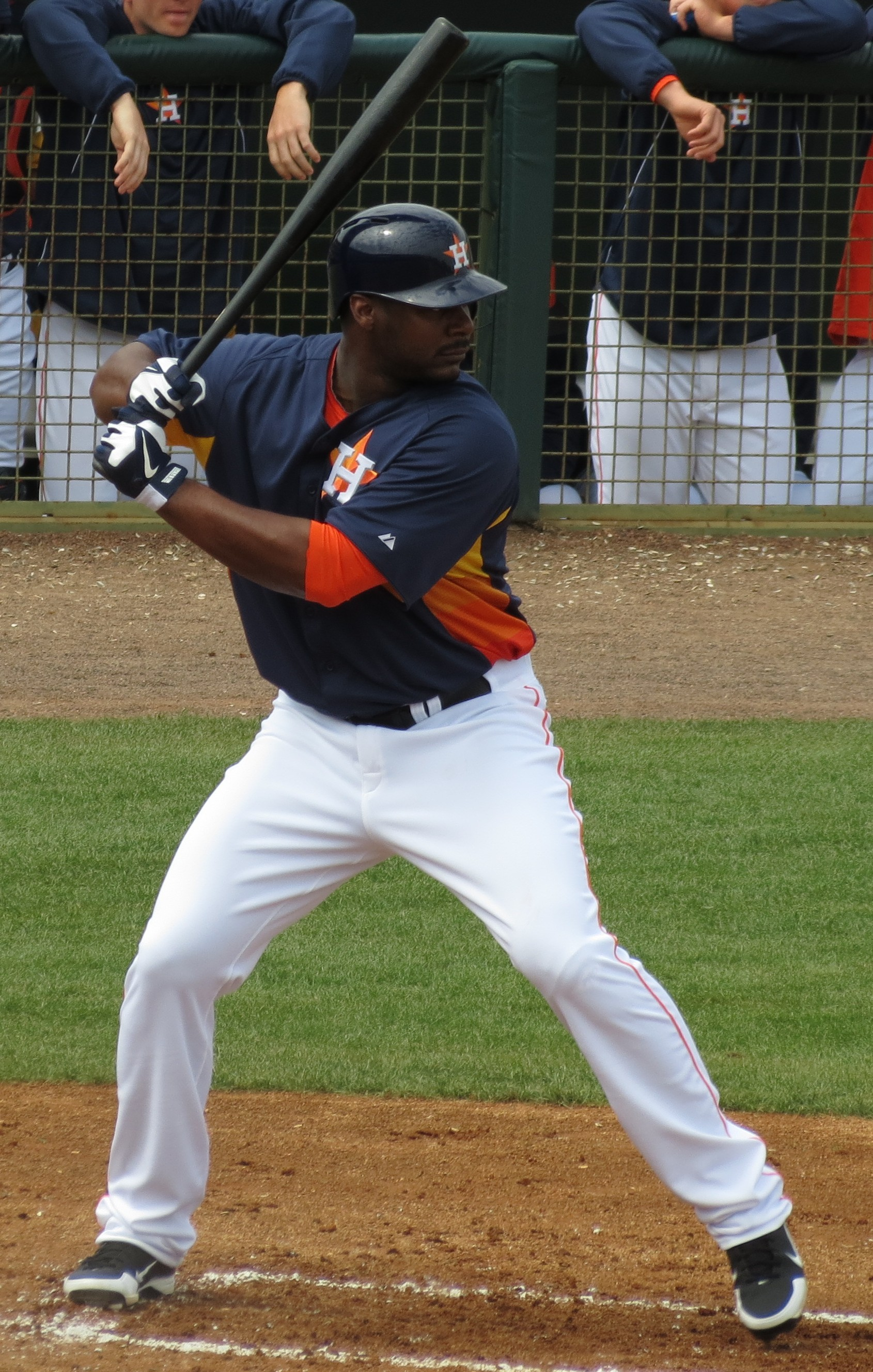
Carter with the Astros in 2013

During the 2013 season, Carter played 148 games batting .223 with 29 home runs, 82 RBI, and struck out an MLB-leading 212 times. He became only the fourth player to strikeout 200 times in a season, with only Mark Reynolds having more strikeouts as a right-handed hitter.

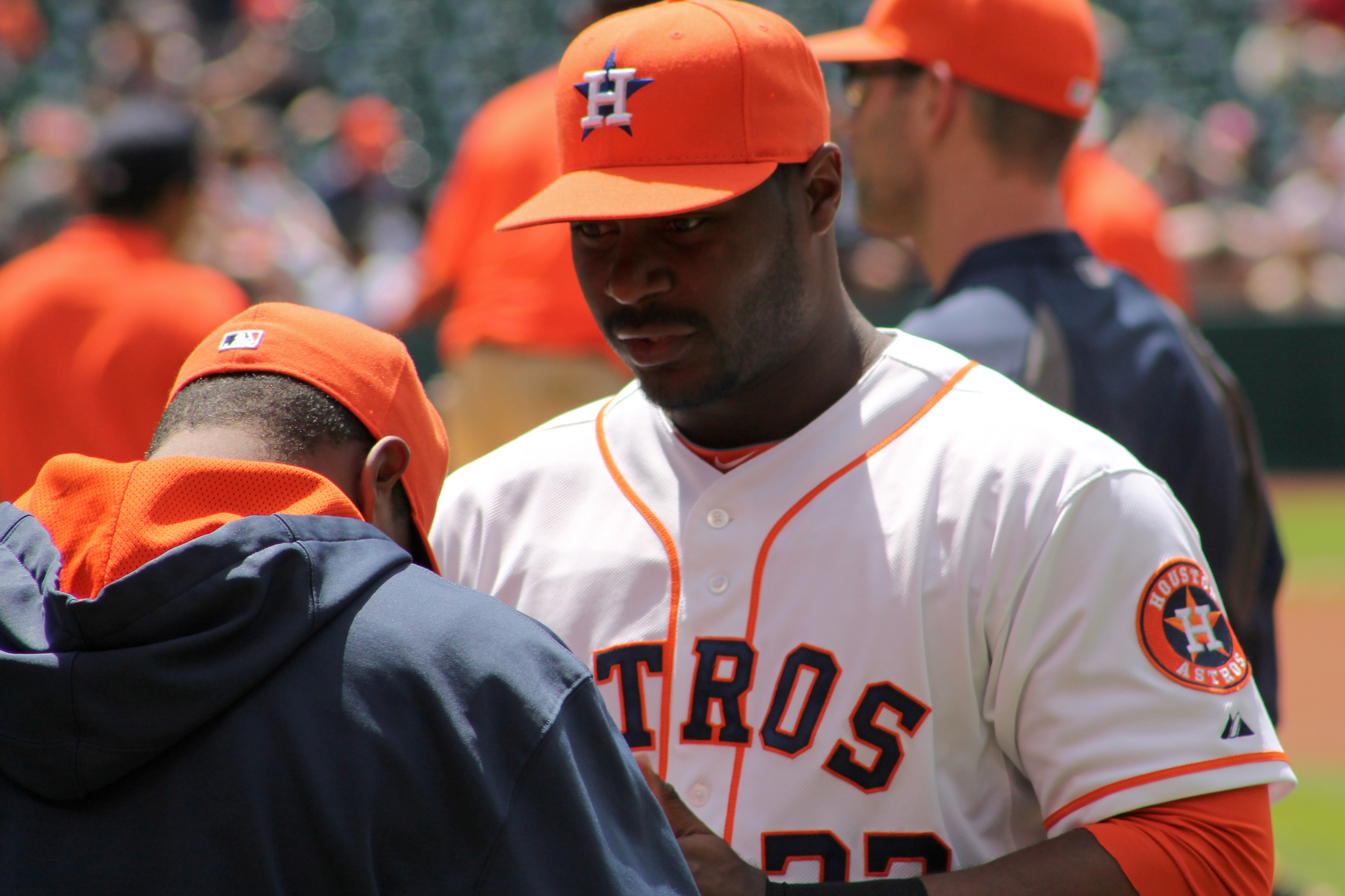
Carter with the Astros in 2014

In 2014, Carter batted .153 through the month of April. His production improved as finished with a .227 batting average and career highs of 37 home runs and 88 RBI.

On January 14, 2015, Carter and the Astros agreed to a one-year contract worth $4.175 million, avoiding arbitration. His 11th career multi-home run game on June 3 against the Baltimore Orioles directly supported rookie Lance McCullers Jr.'s first career complete game and 3–1 Astros win. Carter also extended a season-high 11-game hitting streak. On September 30, with the Seattle Mariners ahead 6–3 in the bottom of the sixth inning, he hit a game-tying three-run home run. Three wins away from making the postseason, the Astros won, 7–6.

Carter played the 2015 season primarily as the team's starting first baseman and appeared in 129 games. He batted .199/.307/.427 with 24 home runs and 64 RBI, struck out 151 times and led the club with 57 walks. He had the highest strikeout percentage against right-handed pitchers in MLB (35.6%). In Game 3 of the American League Division Series (ALDS), Carter's hitting was a triple short of hitting for the cycle. He hit .294 with a home run in the ALDS against the Kansas City Royals. On December 2, 2015, Carter was non-tendered by the Astros and became a free agent. As a member of the Astros, Carter hit .218/.312/.459 with 90 home runs.

=== Milwaukee Brewers (2016) ===
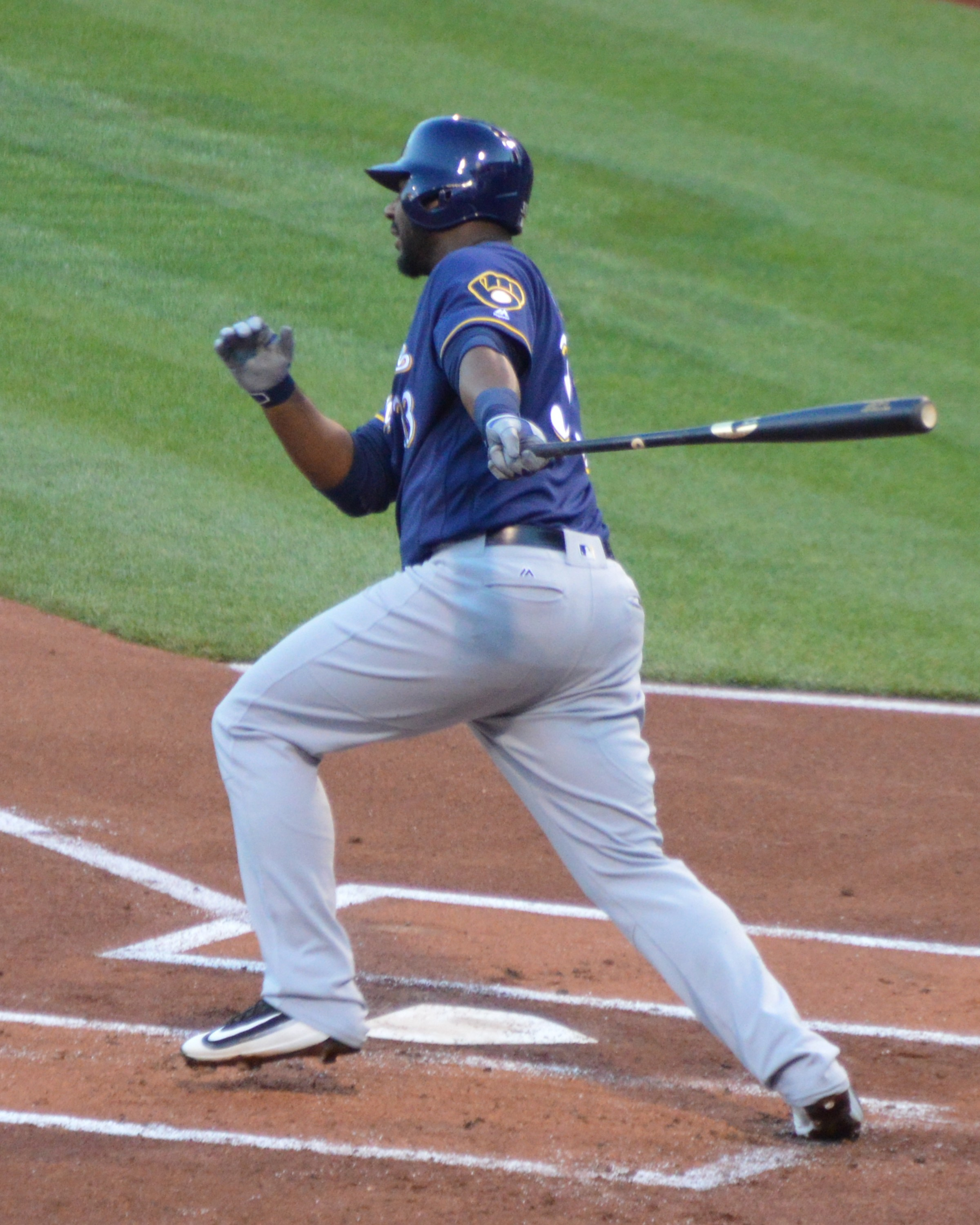
Carter batting for the Milwaukee Brewers in 2016

On January 6, 2016, Carter signed a one-year, $2.5 million contract with the Milwaukee Brewers. He posted a .321 on-base percentage and hit 41 home runs, leading the National League in 2016, while also leading the NL in at bats per home run (13.4) and games played (160). However, he had a .222 batting average and led the league with 206 strikeouts, and had the lowest contact percentage on his swings in the major leagues (64.6%). On defense, he led the NL in errors at first base (11). The Brewers did not tender Carter a contract for the 2017, making him a free agent.

=== New York Yankees (2017) ===
On February 16, 2017, the New York Yankees signed Carter to a one-year contract, worth $3.5 million. Carter batted .204 with eight home runs and 70 strikeouts before the Yankees designated him for assignment on June 24. He was called back up by the Yankees on June 29 when his replacement at first base, Tyler Austin, landed on the disabled list. On July 4, he was again designated for assignment, this time to make room for Ji-man Choi on the roster. He was released on July 10. In 2017, he batted .201/.284/.370.

=== Oakland Athletics (second stint) ===
On July 21, 2017, Carter signed a minor league contract with the Oakland Athletics organization and was assigned to the Nashville Sounds of the PCL. In 36 games for Triple–A Nashville, he batted .252/.357/.512 with 9 home runs and 22 RBI. Carter elected free agency following the season on November 6.

=== Los Angeles Angels ===
On February 18, 2018, Carter signed a minor league contract with the Los Angeles Angels organization. Carter made 38 appearances for the Triple-A Salt Lake Bees, batting .255/.333/.600 with 13 home runs, 43 RBI, and two stolen bases.

=== Minnesota Twins ===
On May 22, 2018, the Angels traded Carter to the Minnesota Twins in exchange for cash. He made 36 appearances for the Triple-A Rochester Red Wings, batting .187/.299/.423 with seven home runs and 15 RBI. Carter was released by the Twins organization on July 7.

=== Acereros de Monclova ===
On February 13, 2019, Carter signed with the Acereros de Monclova of the Mexican League. In his first year with the club he led the league in home runs (49), RBI (119), games played, (120), walks (115), and strikeouts (156), culminating in a victory in the Serie del Rey and the Acereros' first ever league championship. Carter did not play in a game in 2020 due to the cancellation of the Mexican League season because of the COVID-19 pandemic.

In 2021, Carter played in only 26 games for Monclova, hitting .242/.324/.484 with 6 home runs and 19 RBI. For the 2022 season, Carter saw game action 70 times and slashed .249/.436/.549 with 18 home runs and 46 RBI. In 2023, Carter appeared in only 9 games for Monclova, slashing .129/.308/.323 with 1 home run and 5 RBI. He was placed on the reserve list on May 16, 2023.

=== Pericos de Puebla ===
On May 31, 2023, Carter was loaned to the Pericos de Puebla of the Mexican League for the remainder of the season. In the month of July, Carter clobbered 15 home runs and drove in 39 runs. He played in a total of 54 games for Puebla, hitting .308/.474/.752 with 21 home runs and 59 RBI. Carter was named MVP of the 2023 Serie del Rey which Puebla won.

=== Acereros de Monclova (second stint) ===
On January 9, 2024, Carter signed a contract to return to the Acereros de Monclova of the Mexican League. In 34 games, Carter batted .237/.340/.489 with 8 home runs and 26 RBI.

=== Pericos de Puebla (second stint) ===
On June 11, 2024, Carter was traded to the Pericos de Puebla in exchange for Odúbel Herrera. In 39 games for Puebla, he slashed .288/.460/.595 with nine home runs and 29 RBI.

=== Piratas de Campeche ===
On September 19, 2024, Carter was traded back to the Acereros de Monclova in exchange for Odúbel Herrera. However, on January 15, 2025, Carter was traded to the Piratas de Campeche. In 67 appearances for the Piratas, he slashed .231/.353/.521 with 21 home runs and 45 RBI.

=== Saraperos de Saltillo ===
On February 12, 2026, Carter was loaned to the Saraperos de Saltillo of the Mexican League for the 2026 season.

== Personal life ==
Carter's father, Vernon, played basketball for Rancho High School in North Las Vegas. Carter is a car enthusiast. He owns a Shelby Super Snake.

== See also ==
- Houston Astros award winners and league leaders
- List of Houston Astros team records
- List of Milwaukee Brewers team records
- Notable people from Redwood City
