= List of Milwaukee Brewers team records =

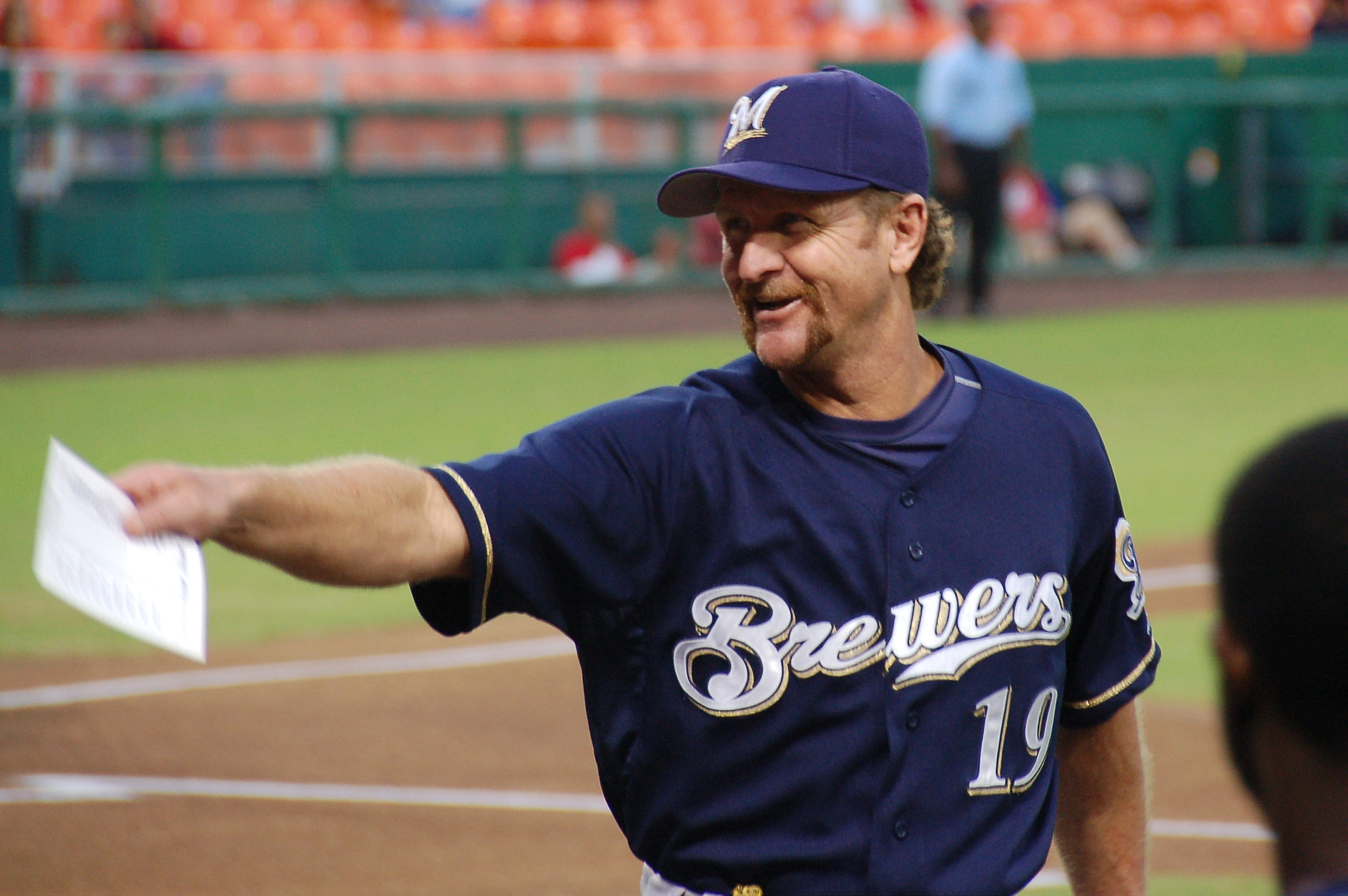
Robin Yount is the Brewers' career leader in games played (2,856), runs (1,632), hits (3,142), doubles (583), triples (126), runs batted in (1,406), and walks (966).

The Milwaukee Brewers are a Major League Baseball franchise based in Milwaukee, Wisconsin. Established in Seattle, Washington, as the Seattle Pilots in 1969, the team became the Milwaukee Brewers after relocating to Milwaukee in 1970. The franchise played in the American League until 1998 when it moved to the National League in conjunction with a major league realignment. This list documents players and teams who hold records set in various statistical areas during single seasons or their team careers.

== Table key ==
†	Record was set when the team was known as the Seattle Pilots
*	Tied record

== Career records ==
=== Career batting ===
These are records of players with the best performance in distinct statistical batting categories during their career with the Brewers.

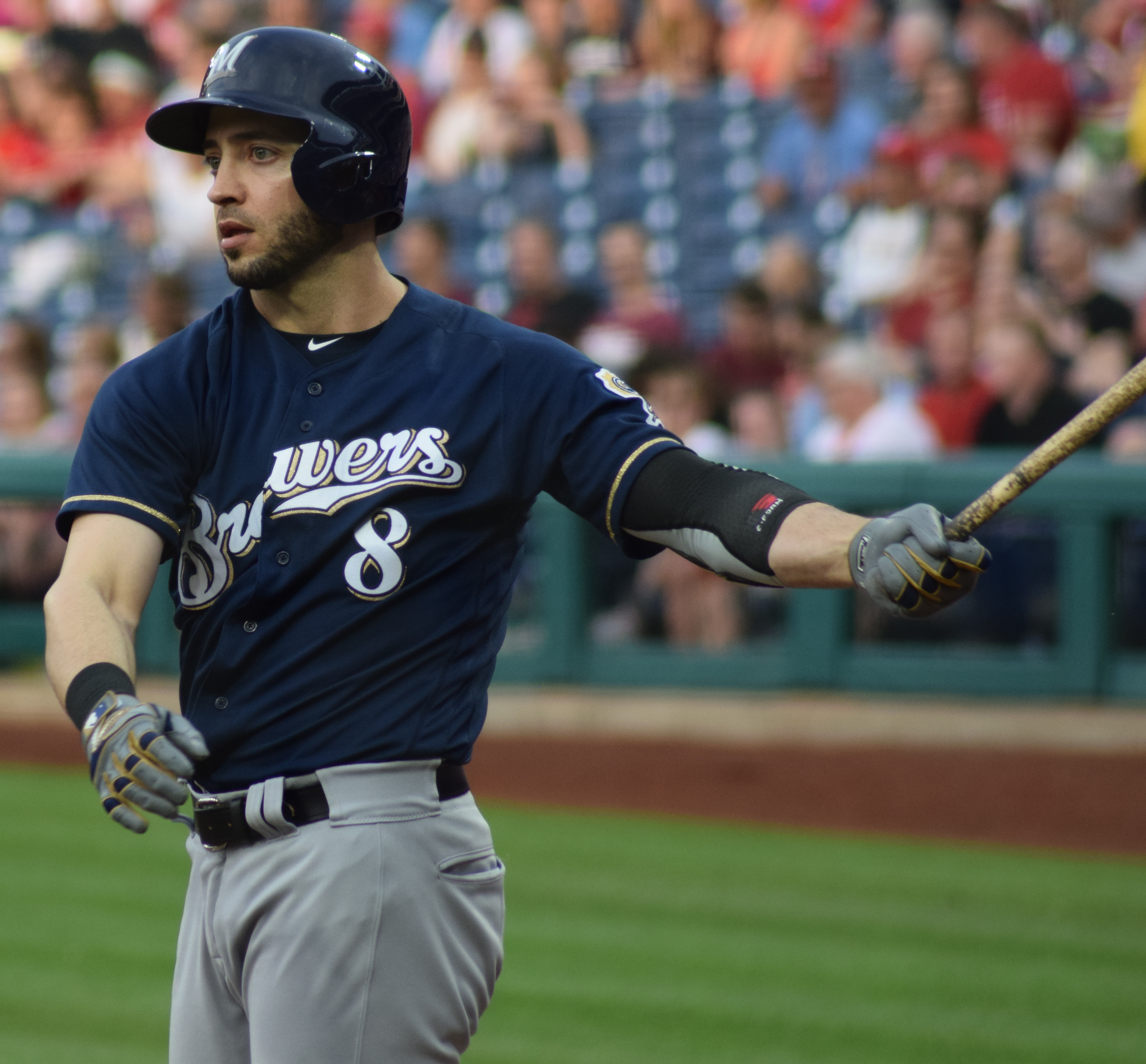
Ryan Braun is the career leader in home runs (352).

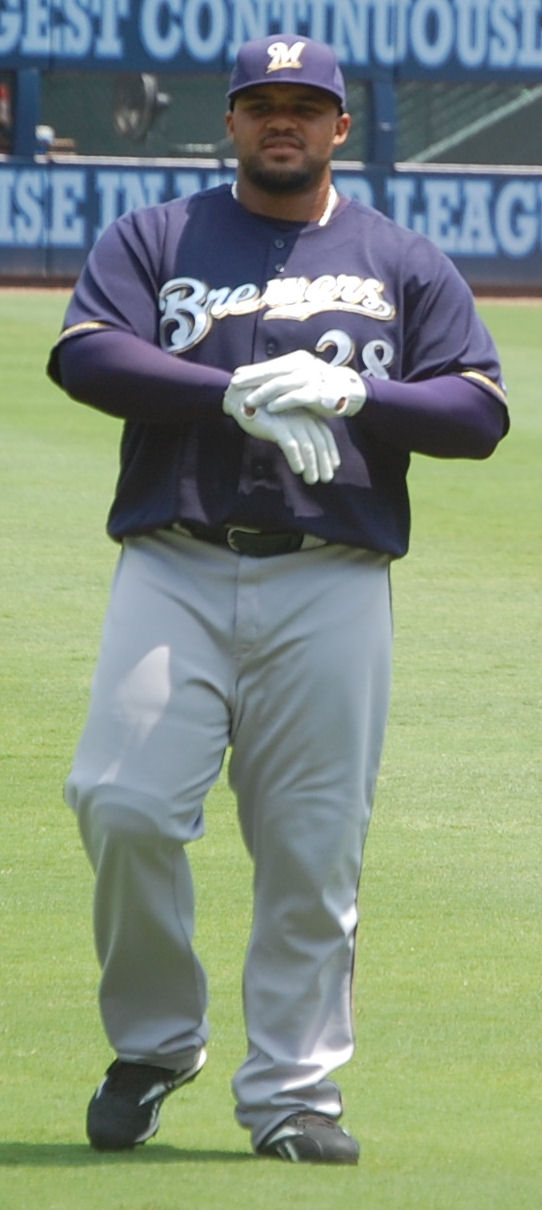
Prince Fielder is the career leader in on-base percentage (.390), slugging percentage (.540), and on-base plus slugging (.929).

Statistic	Player	Record	Brewers career	Ref.
Games played	Robin Yount	2,856	1974–1993	
Plate appearances	Robin Yount	12,249	1974–1993	
At bats	Robin Yount	11,008	1974–1993	
Runs	Robin Yount	1,632	1974–1993	
Hits	Robin Yount	3,142	1974–1993	
Doubles	Robin Yount	583	1974–1993	
Triples	Robin Yount	126	1974–1993	
Home runs	Ryan Braun	352	2007–2020	
Runs batted in	Robin Yount	1,406	1974–1993	
Stolen bases	Paul Molitor	412	1978–1992	
Walks	Robin Yount	966	1974–1993	
Strikeouts	Ryan Braun	1,363	2007–2020	
Batting average	Jeff Cirillo	.307	1994–1999, 2005–2006	
On-base percentage	Prince Fielder	.390	2005–2011	
Slugging percentage	Prince Fielder	.540	2005–2011	
On-base plus slugging	Prince Fielder	.929	2005–2011	
Total bases	Robin Yount	4,730	1974–1993	
Hit by pitch	Rickie Weeks	125	2003, 2005–2014	
Sacrifice hits	Jim Gantner	106	1976–1992	
Sacrifice flies	Robin Yount	123	1974–1993	
Intentional walks	Prince Fielder	115	2005–2011	

=== Career pitching ===
These are records of players with the best performance in distinct statistical pitching categories during their career with the Brewers.

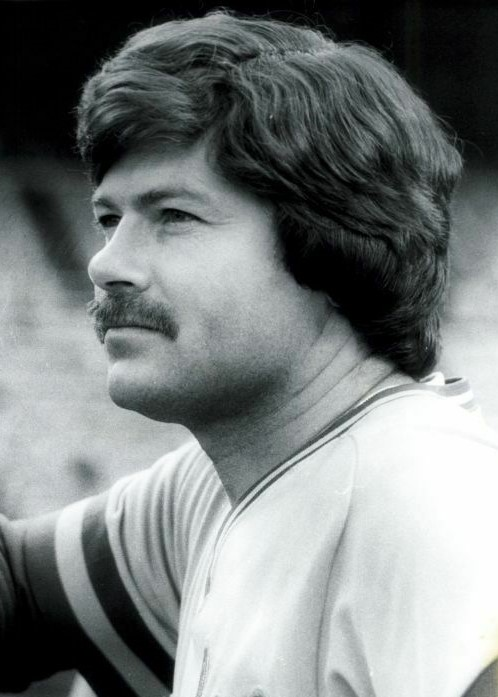
Jim Slaton is the career leader in wins (117), starts (268), shutouts (19), and innings pitched (2,025 1/3).

Statistic	Player	Record	Brewers career	Ref.
Wins	Jim Slaton	117	1971–1977, 1979–1983	
Losses	Jim Slaton	121	1971–1977, 1979–1983	
Winning percentage	Brent Suter	.655	2016–2022	
Earned run average	Brandon Woodruff	3.10	2017–2023, 2025–2026	
Games pitched	Dan Plesac	365	1986–1992	
Games started	Jim Slaton	268	1971–1977, 1979–1983	
Complete games	Mike Caldwell	81	1977–1984	
Shutouts	Jim Slaton	19	1971–1977, 1979–1983	
Saves	Dan Plesac	133	1986–1992	
Innings pitched	Jim Slaton	2,025 1/3	1971–1977, 1979–1983	
Hits allowed	Jim Slaton	2,054	1971–1977, 1979–1983	
Earned runs allowed	Jim Slaton	869	1971–1977, 1979–1983	
Home runs allowed	Jim Slaton	192	1971–1977, 1979–1983	
Walks	Jim Slaton	760	1971–1977, 1979–1983	
Strikeouts	Yovani Gallardo	1,226	2007–2014	
Batters faced	Jim Slaton	8,668	1971–1977, 1979–1983	
Walks plus hits per inning pitched	Brandon Woodruff	1.022	2017–2023, 2025–2026	

== Single-season records ==
=== Single-season batting ===
These are records of players with the best performance in distinct statistical batting categories during a single season.

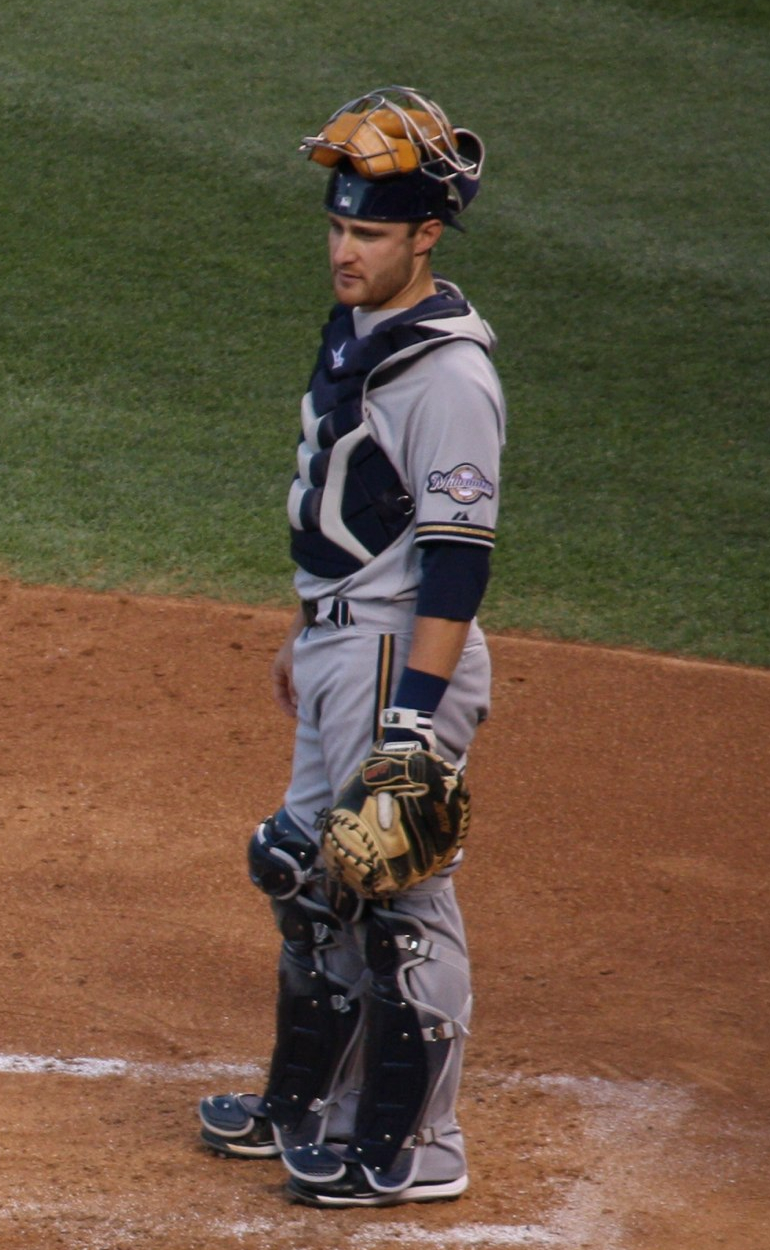
Jonathan Lucroy tied the single-season doubles record (53) in 2014.

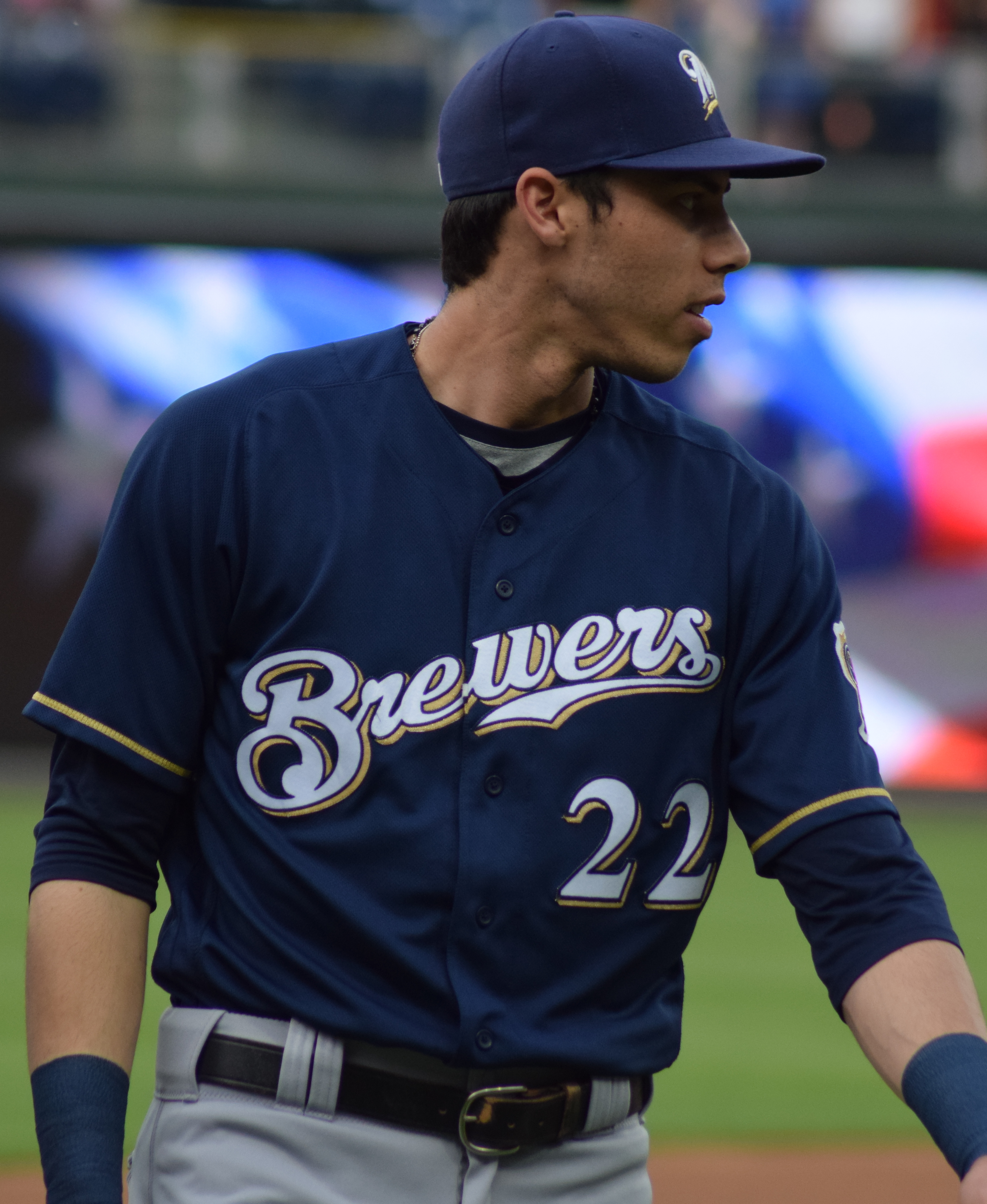
Christian Yelich set the single-season records for slugging percentage (.671) and on-base plus slugging (1.100) in 2019.

Statistic	Player	Record	Season	Ref.
Games played*	Prince Fielder	162*	2009	
Games played*	Prince Fielder	162*	2011	
Games played*	Carlos Lee	162*	2005	
Games played*	Richie Sexson	162*	2003	
Games played*	Gorman Thomas	162*	1980	
Games played*	Robin Yount	162*	1988	
Plate appearances	Rickie Weeks	754	2010	
At bats	Paul Molitor	666	1982	
Runs	Paul Molitor	136	1982	
Hits	Cecil Cooper	219	1980	
Doubles*	Jonathan Lucroy	53*	2014	
Doubles*	Lyle Overbay	53*	2004	
Triples	Paul Molitor	16	1979	
Home runs	Prince Fielder	50	2007	
Runs batted in	Prince Fielder	141	2009	
Stolen bases	Tommy Harper^{†}	73	1969	
Walks	Prince Fielder	114	2010	
Strikeouts	Chris Carter	206	2016	
Batting average	Paul Molitor	.353	1987	
On-base percentage	Paul Molitor	.438	1987	
Slugging percentage	Christian Yelich	.671	2019	
On-base plus slugging	Christian Yelich	1.100	2019	
Total bases	Robin Yount	367	1982	
Hit by pitch*	Fernando Viña	25*	1998	
Hit by pitch*	Rickie Weeks	25*	2010	
Sacrifice hits	Ron Theobald	19	1971	
Sacrifice flies	Dave Parker	14	1990	
Intentional walks	Prince Fielder	32	2011	

=== Single-season pitching ===
These are records of players with the best performance in distinct statistical pitching categories during a single season.

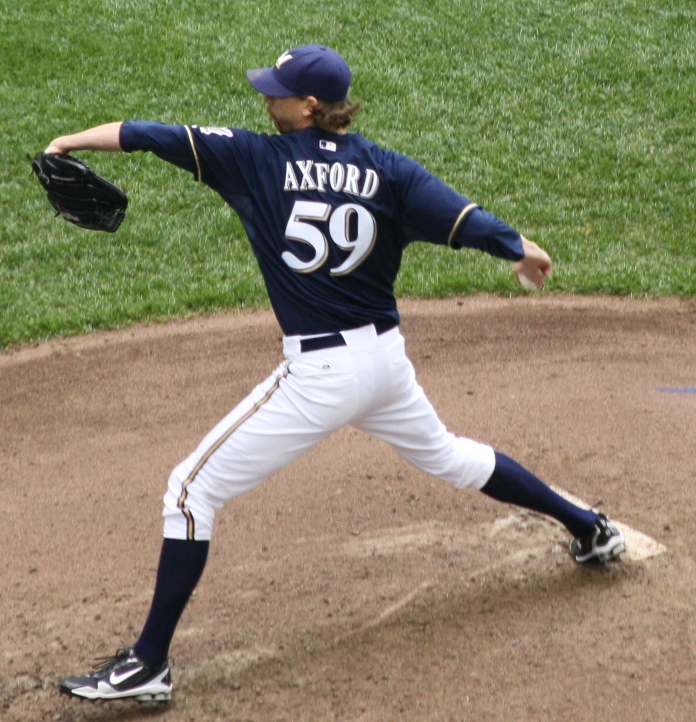
John Axford set the single-season saves record (46) in 2011.

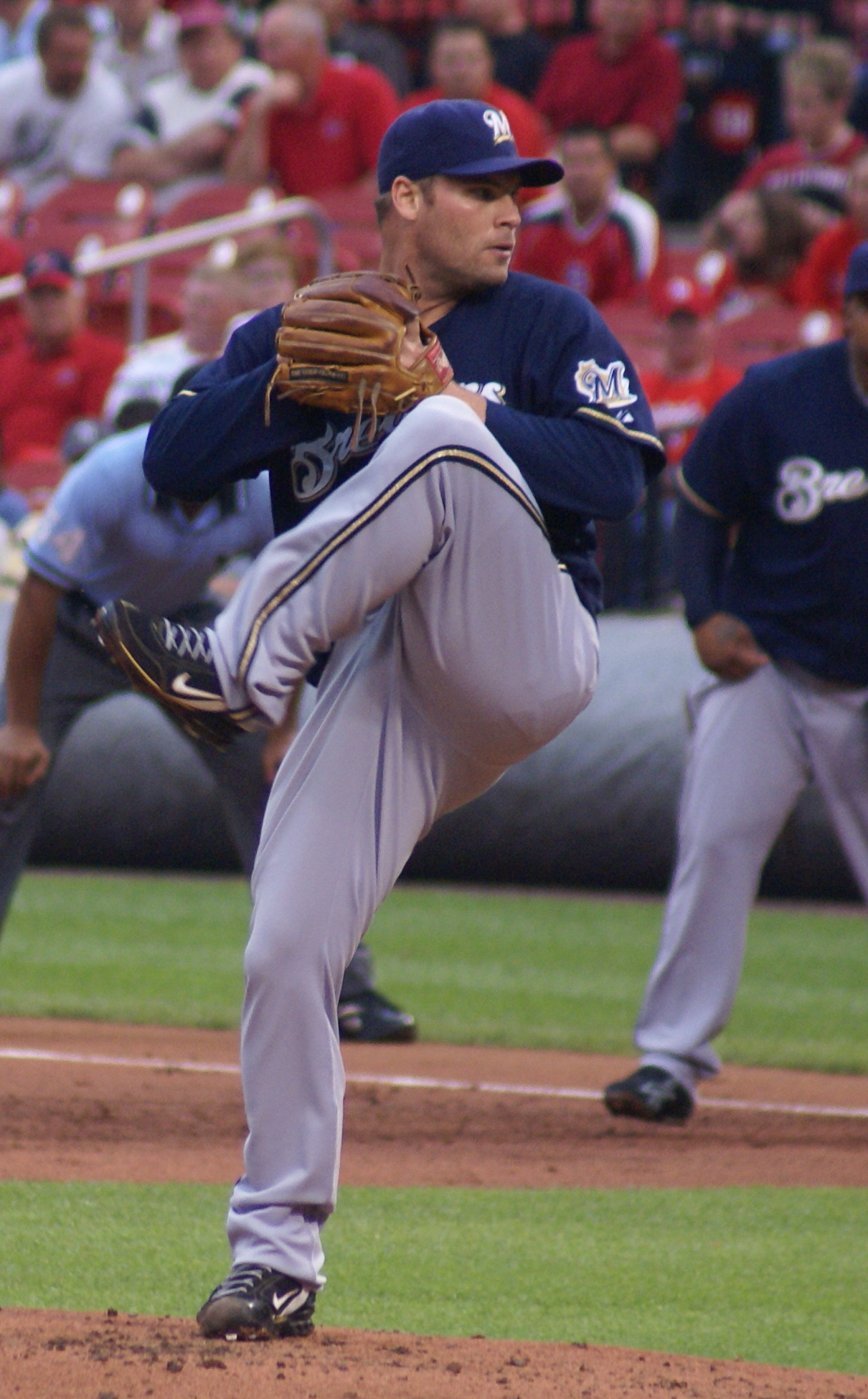
Ben Sheets set the single-season records for strikeouts (264) and WHIP (0.983) in 2004.

Statistic	Player	Record	Season	Ref.
Wins	Mike Caldwell	22	1978	
Losses	Clyde Wright	20	1974	
Winning percentage*	Moose Haas	.813*	1983	
Winning percentage*	Quinn Priester	.813*	2025	
Winning percentage*	Aaron Ashby	.813*	2026	
Earned run average	Jacob Misiorowski	1.80	2026	
Games pitched*	Alex Claudio	83*	2019	
Games pitched*	Ken Sanders	83*	1971	
Games started*	Jim Slaton	38*	1973	
Games started*	Jim Slaton	38*	1976	
Complete games	Mike Caldwell	23	1978	
Shutouts	Mike Caldwell	6	1978	
Saves	John Axford	46	2011	
Innings pitched	Jim Colborn	314 1/3	1973	
Hits allowed	Jim Colborn	297	1973	
Earned runs allowed	Jaime Navarro	127	1993	
Home runs allowed	Braden Looper	39	2009	
Walks	Pete Broberg	106	1975	
Strikeouts	Ben Sheets	264	2004	
Batters faced	Jim Colborn	1,287	1973	
Walks plus hits per inning pitched	Jacob Misiorowski	0.802	2026	

== Team season records ==
These team records exclude the 1981, 1994, 1995, and 2020 shortened seasons.

=== Season general ===
These are records of Brewers teams with the best and worst performances in distinct statistical categories during a single season.

Statistic	High	Season(s)	Low	Season(s)
Wins	103	2026	56	2002
Losses	106	2002	59	2026
Winning percentage	.636	2026	.346	2002

=== Season batting ===
These are records of Brewers teams with the best and worst performances in distinct statistical batting categories during a single season.

Statistic	High	Season(s)	Low	Season(s)
Plate appearances	6,434	1996	5,733	1972
At bats	5,733	1982	5,124	1972
Runs	894	1996	493	1972
Hits	1,599	1982	1,188	1971
Doubles	327	2005	160	1971
Triples	57	1983	16	2023
Home runs	250	2019	82	1992
Runs batted in	845	1996	461	1972
Stolen bases	256	1992	52	1984
Caught stealing	115	1992	21	2021
Walks	668	2026	407	2013
Strikeouts	1,571	2017	665	1983
Batting average	.280	1979	.229	1971
On-base percentage	.353*	1996, 1999	.302	1972
Slugging percentage	.456	2007	.328	1972
On-base plus slugging	.794	1996	.629	1972

=== Season pitching ===
These are records of Brewers teams with the best and worst performances in distinct statistical pitching categories during a single season.

Statistic	High	Season(s)	Low	Season(s)
Earned run average	5.14	1996	3.38	1971
Complete games	62	1978	0*	2012, 2016, 2018, 2019, 2022, 2024, 2025
Shutouts	23	1971	2*	1970, 1998
Saves	55	2026	23	1979
Innings pitched	1,467 1/3	1982	1,391 2/3	1972
Hits allowed	1,618	1999	1,156	2021
Runs allowed	899	1996	595	1972
Earned runs	826	1996	532	1971
Home runs allowed	225	2019	99	1976
Walks	728	2000	381	1979
Strikeouts	1,618	2021	575	1980
Walks plus hits per inning pitched	1.551	1995	1.178	2026

=== Season fielding ===
These are records of Brewers teams with the best and worst performances in distinct statistical fielding categories during a single season.

Statistic	High	Season(s)	Low	Season(s)
Fielding percentage	.987*	2023, 2025, 2026	.971	1975
Errors	180	1975	72	2026
Double plays	192	1998	102	2021
