= Amortization (tax law) =

In tax law, amortization refers to the cost recovery system for intangible property. Although the theory behind cost recovery deductions of amortization is to deduct from basis in a systematic manner over an asset's estimated useful economic life so as to reflect its consumption, expiration, obsolescence or other decline in value as a result of use or the passage of time, a perfect match of income and deductions often does not occur for policy reasons.

== Depreciation ==
A corresponding concept for tangible assets is depreciation. Methodologies for allocating amortization to each tax period are generally the same as for depreciation. However, many intangible assets such as goodwill or certain brands may be deemed to have an indefinite useful life, or “self-created” and are therefore not subject to amortization.

== In the United States of America ==
The United States Congress gives taxpayers larger deductions in the early years of an asset’s useful life.

=== Intangible property ===
Intangible property which is subject to amortization is described in 26 U.S.C. §§ 197(c)(1) and 197(d) and must be property held either for use in a trade, business, or for the production of income. Before 1993, the United States Tax Code did not contain provisions for cost recovery of intangible assets; rather, the intangible assets were depreciated under the current provisions for depreciation of tangible assets, 26 U.S.C. §§ 167 and 168. However, the problem before 1993 was that many intangible assets did not meet the burdensome requirements of §§ 167 and 168 because intangible assets can not necessarily be subject to “wear and tear”. This led to taxpayers having the incentive to ignore any basis in the intangible asset until it was sold.

Under §197 most acquired intangible assets are to be amortized ratably over a fifteen-year period. This is not the best treatment of an intangible whose actual life is much shorter than fifteen years. Furthermore, if an intangible is not eligible for amortization under § 197, the taxpayer can depreciate the asset if there is a showing of the assets useful life.

=== Startup expenditure ===
Startup expenditures are defined as investigatory expenses incurred prior to commencing a trade or business activity which would have been deducted had they been paid or incurred when the taxpayer was already engaged in the trade or business activity.

Unlike other sections in the tax code which do not allow current deductions for most startup expenses, section 195 allows a taxpayer to amortize start-up expenditures over a 180-month period. The policy behind this provision is to encourage taxpayers to explore new business ventures.

== See also ==
- Writing down allowance

== Sources ==
- Samuel A. Donaldson. Federal Income Taxation of Individuals: Cases Problems, and Materials. 2nd ed. 2007.
