= Web property =

A web property is a point of presence (e.g. a website, social media account, blog, etc.) on the web that is an asset of an entity (e.g. an individual or corporation) used for the purpose of representing a brand, person or other identity. The property can be considered a communication channel for the entity whose identity is associated with it. Points of presence on the web which contain content about an entity may not be property that can be owned by that entity (e.g. restaurant review pages on sites such as Yelp).

Web property is considered intangible property and is analogous to real property in that it has ownership which can be recorded and transferred though ascertaining ownership is not always a simple or easy matter to resolve. The issue of ownership can be particularly challenging in relation to the employer-employee situation. Two current legal cases are likely to set precedent in this area, § PhoneDog v. Kravitz and § Eagle v. Morgan.

== Websites as web property ==
The ownership of a website usually can be ascertained via the registration of the domain name via the Domain Name System. The Registrant record of the DNS identifies the individual or company who has the right to use, sell or destroy a domain name. Ownership of the domain name does not guarantee ownership of the website to which it points or the content contained there.

== Social media as web property ==
Social media presents a different challenge regarding web property ownership. For individuals, the web point of presence is owned by the individual who created it (e.g. the owner of a Facebook Account could be considered the owner of the Facebook page which he or she created). However, if the point of presence was created for a business (e.g. a corporation), then the law is not entirely settled though two cases are currently working through the courts:

=== PhoneDog v. Kravitz ===
PhoneDog v. Kravitz is a "lawsuit involving a web-based company and a former employee [which] has put a spotlight on the ownership and value of a Twitter account begun by an employee under the auspices of his employment, but continued by him, under a different name, after he terminated his employment." On 3 December 2012, "Kravitz announced that he and PhoneDog have reached an agreement under which Kravitz will get to keep his Twitter account -- and his followers."

=== Eagle v. Morgan ===
In 2010 Sawbeh Information Services Company (SISCOM) purchased Edcomm from Linda Eagle and her partners. In 2008, Eagle had created a LinkedIn account that she used for business and personal purposes, and utilized the services of another employee, Elizabeth Sweeney, to maintain the account. In 2011, Eagle and her partners were discharged but SISCOM's new executive team acquired the password to Eagle's account and took control of it, locking out Eagle. Eagle is now suing to regain control of her account. SISCOM's claimed that Eagle's LinkedIn connections belonged to the company, that Eagle stole the connections and subsequently reaped the benefit of the time and efforts it put into maintaining her LinkedIn account.

== Unresolved questions ==
There are a couple questions left unresolved with respect to the ownership of web points of presence:

1. Can the content of a point of presence be owned separately from the presence itself?
2. Can the community attached to a point of presence (e.g. friends, fans, and followers) be owned separately from the presence itself?

== See also ==
- Intangible property
