= Crescent Capital Group =

Global alternative investment firm

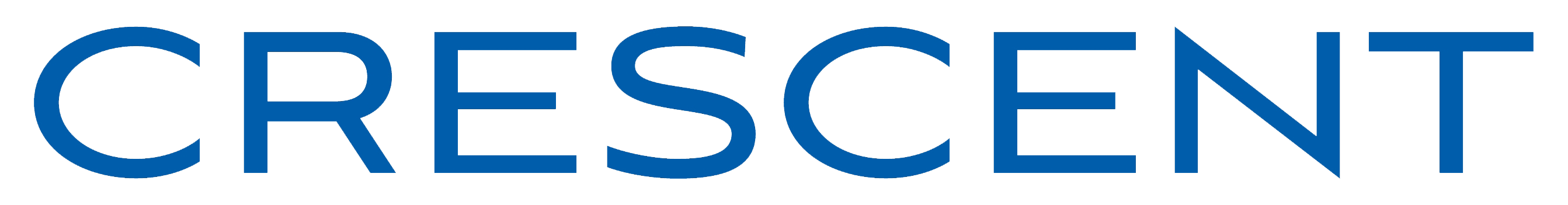
- Type: Subsidiary
- Industry: Alternative Investment, Asset Management, Private Equity
- Predecessor: TCW/Crescent Mezzanine
- Founded: 1991; 35 years ago
- Founder: Mark Attanasio, Robert Beyer, and Jean-Marc Chapus
- Headquarters: Los Angeles, California, United States
- Products: Mezzanine capital; Hedge funds; Senior debt; High-yield bonds; Distressed securities
- AUM: US$50 billion (December 2025)
- Number of employees: 230 (December 2025)
- Parent: Sun Life Financial
- Website: crescentcap.com

Crescent Capital Group is a global alternative investment firm focused on below investment grade credit markets with primary strategies that include funds that invest in leveraged loans, high-yield bonds, mezzanine debt, special situations, and distressed securities. The firm has approximately $50 billion of assets under management and has made investments in over 190 companies since its inception as well as expanded into the European market with operations based in London.

Since its founding in 1991, the firm has raised approximately $25 billion across seven funds. TCW/Crescent maintains a strategic partnership with TCW Group (Trust Company of the West), a leading institutional money management firm with approximately $180 billion in assets under management.

In January 2021, Sun Life Financial acquired a majority stake (51%) in the company. The firm is based in Los Angeles.

== History ==
Logo in use by TCW/Crescent Mezzanine until the firm's 2010 separation from TCW

In 1991, former Drexel Burnham Lambert investment bankers Mark Attanasio, Robert D. Beyer and Jean-Marc Chapus founded Crescent Capital Corporation, a Dallas-based investment firm that invested in high yield bonds.

After Drexel Burnham Lambert was forced into bankruptcy in February 1990 due to Michael Milken's involvement in the junk bond market, Attanasio and Chapus stayed behind to manage the bankruptcy estate. Drexel had $2 billion of high-yield securities, which gave them the largest distressed portfolio in the country at the time.

Based on their successful experience with the Drexel estate, the founders organized Crescent Capital as an asset manager in 1991 to provide capital to middle-market companies and to manage distressed portfolios. Attanasio sold Crescent to the Trust Company of the West (later renamed TCW Group), an investment firm based in Los Angeles, in 1995. After the sale of Crescent, Attanasio remained a senior partner and chief investment officer of the firm's leveraged finance and mezzanine capital group.

In 2001, Société Générale (SocGen) acquired a controlling interest in the TCW Group. In 2005, TCW/Crescent merged with Canterbury Mezzanine Capital to provide the firm a stronger presence on the East Coast. Canterbury was founded as a spinout of Barclays Capital, founded by Nicholas Dunphy and Patrick Turner.

In 2010, Crescent Capital Group spun off from TCW to re-establish itself as a stand-alone firm. The arrangement was described as "amicable" for TCW and Crescent. The working relationship of the two companies remains close; the two share management fees for existing clients. Following the separation, the firm was renamed Crescent Capital Group.

In August 2020, the Canadian-based Sun Life Financial (SLF) began advanced talks to acquire the company. In January 2021, SLF acquired a majority stake (51%) in the company.
