= Bud Selig =

Major League Baseball Commissioner from 1992 to 2015 (born 1934)

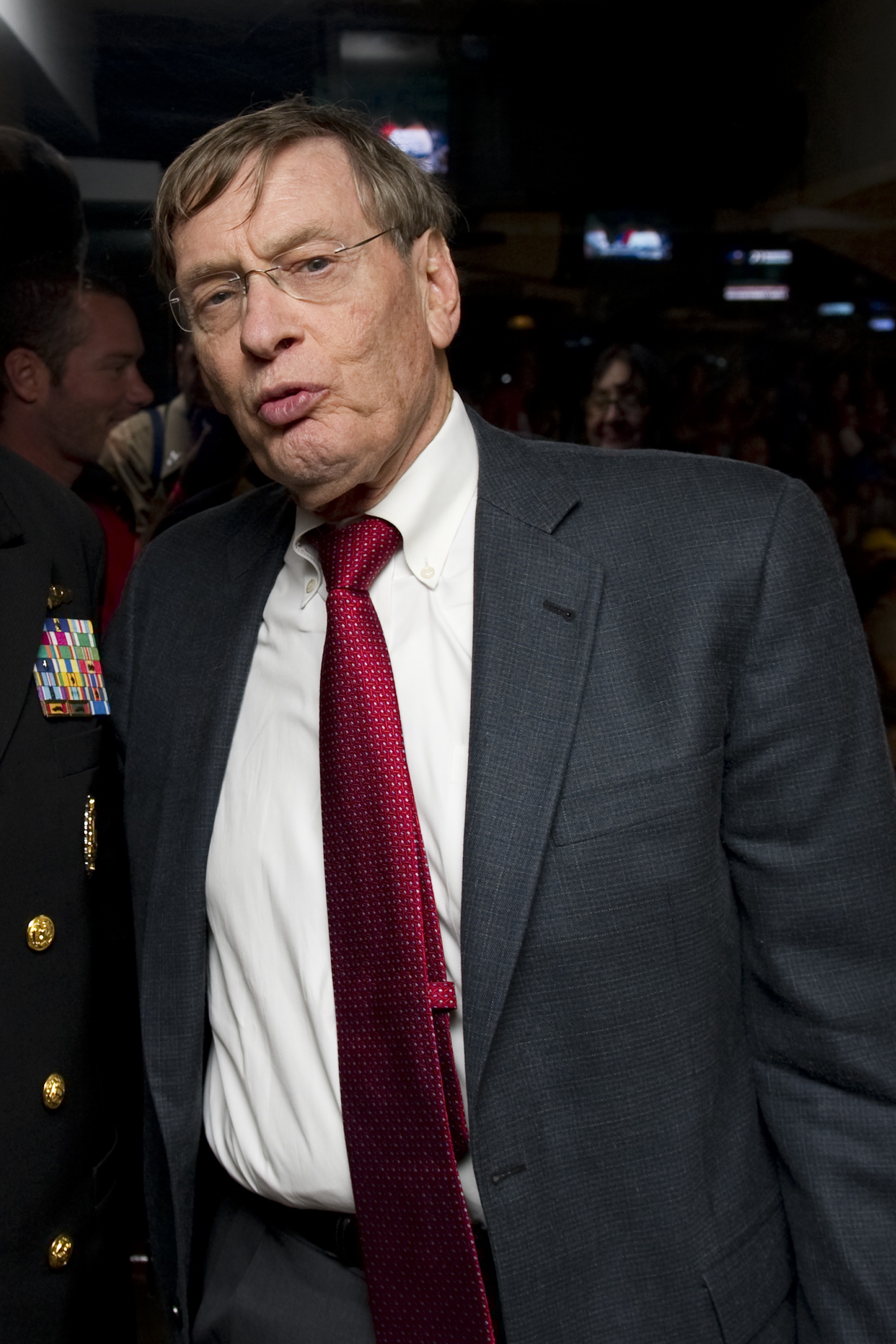
- Selig in 2010

Commissioner Emeritus of Baseball
- Incumbent
- Life tenure January 25, 2015
- Preceded by: Position created

9th Commissioner of Baseball
- In office July 9, 1998 – January 25, 2015; Acting: September 7, 1992 – July 9, 1998
- Preceded by: Fay Vincent
- Succeeded by: Rob Manfred

Personal details
- Born: Allan Huber Selig; July 30, 1934 (age 92) Milwaukee, Wisconsin, U.S.
- Spouses: Donna Chaimson (m. 1956; div. 1976) Suzanne Lappin Steinman (m. 1977)
- Education: University of Wisconsin–Madison (BA)
- Baseball career

Member of the National

Baseball Hall of Fame
- Induction: 2017
- Vote: 93.8%
- Election method: Today's Game Era Committee

Allan Huber "Bud" Selig (/ˈsiːlɪɡ/; born July 30, 1934) is an American baseball executive who currently serves as the commissioner emeritus of baseball. Previously, he served as the ninth commissioner of baseball from 1998 to 2015. He initially served as de facto acting commissioner beginning in 1992 in his capacity as chairman of the Major League Baseball (MLB) Executive Committee before being named the official commissioner in 1998. Selig oversaw baseball through the 1994 strike, the introduction of the wild card, interleague play, and the de facto merging of the National and American leagues under the Office of the Commissioner. He was instrumental in organizing the World Baseball Classic in 2006. Selig also introduced revenue sharing. He is credited for the financial turnaround of baseball during his tenure with a 400 percent increase in the revenue of MLB and annual record-breaking attendance.

During Selig's term of service, the use of steroids and other performance-enhancing drugs became a public issue. The Mitchell Report, commissioned by Selig, concluded that the MLB commissioners, club officials, the Players Association, and the players all share "to some extent in the responsibility for the steroid era." Following the release of the Mitchell Report, Congressman Cliff Stearns called publicly for Selig to step down as commissioner, citing his "glacial response" to the "growing stain on baseball." Selig has pledged on numerous occasions to rid baseball of performance-enhancing drugs, and has overseen and instituted many rule changes and penalties to that end.

A Milwaukee native, Selig was previously the owner and team president of the Milwaukee Brewers. The franchise, originally known as the Seattle Pilots, was acquired by Selig in bankruptcy court in 1970, and renamed after the minor league team of the same name that he had watched in his youth and had existed until the arrival of the Braves in Milwaukee in 1953. Selig was credited with keeping baseball in Milwaukee. The Brewers went to the 1982 World Series (but were defeated in seven games by the St. Louis Cardinals), and Selig won seven Organization of the Year awards during his tenure. Selig remains a resident of Milwaukee.

On January 17, 2008, Selig's contract was extended through 2012, after which he planned to retire, but he then decided to stay as commissioner until the end of the 2014 season, a move approved by the owners on January 12, 2012, which would take his leadership past his 80th birthday. Selig made $14.5 million in the 12-month period ending October 31, 2005. Selig announced on September 26, 2013, that he would retire in January 2015. On January 22, 2015, MLB announced that Selig would formally step down from the office when his current term expired on January 24, 2015. He was inducted into the Baseball Hall of Fame in 2017.

== Early life ==
Selig was born in Milwaukee, and grew up in a Jewish family. His father, Ben Selig, had come to the United States from Romania with his family when he was four years old. Selig graduated from the University of Wisconsin–Madison with a B.A. in American history and political science in 1956. He served two years in the U.S. Army before working with his father who owned a car leasing business in Milwaukee. Selig continues to be involved in the automotive industry, serving as president of the Selig Executive Lease Company.

Selig's interest in baseball came from his mother. An immigrant from Ukraine, Marie Selig attended college, a rare accomplishment for a woman in the early 20th century, and became a school teacher. When Selig was only three, Marie began taking him and his older brother, Jerry, to Borchert Field, where the minor league Milwaukee Brewers played. When the Boston Braves relocated to Milwaukee in 1953, Selig switched allegiances, and eventually became the team's largest public stockholder. Selig was devastated when he learned that the Braves were going to leave Milwaukee in favor of Atlanta. In 1965, when the Braves left Milwaukee, he divested his stock in the team. As a youngster, Selig's favorite player was Hershel Martin. He developed a friendship with Hank Aaron, when the young player joined the Braves. The elder Selig's company provided loaner cars to Braves players, which gave the family access to the clubhouse and players. Selig and Aaron attended Green Bay Packers games together and sat together on the Brave's plane.

== Milwaukee Brewers owner ==
As a minority owner of the Milwaukee Braves, Selig founded the organization Teams, Inc., in an attempt to prevent the majority owners (based out of Chicago) from moving the club to a larger television market. This was challenged legally on the basis that no prior team relocations (in the modern era) left a city without a team. Prior movements had all originated in cities that were home to at least two teams. When his quest to keep the team in Milwaukee finally failed after the 1965 season, he changed the group's name to Milwaukee Brewers Baseball Club, Inc., after the minor league baseball team he grew up watching, and devoted himself to returning Major League Baseball to Milwaukee.

Selig arranged for major league games to be played at Milwaukee County Stadium. The first, a pre-season match-up between the Chicago White Sox and Minnesota Twins, drew more than 51,000 spectators. Selig followed this up by hosting nine White Sox regular-season games in 1968 and eleven in 1969. One of the games played in Milwaukee that year was against the expansion Seattle Pilots, the team that would become the Brewers. Those Milwaukee "home" games were phenomenally successful, with the handful of games accounting for about one-third of total White Sox home attendance.

To satisfy that fan base, Selig decided to purchase the White Sox (with the intention of moving them to Milwaukee) in 1969. He entered into an agreement to buy the club, but the American League vetoed the sale, preferring to keep an American League team in Chicago, which at the time was still America's second-largest city. Selig turned his attention to other franchises.

In 1970, he purchased the bankrupt Seattle Pilots franchise, moving them to his hometown and officially renaming the team the Brewers.

During Selig's tenure as club president, the Brewers participated in postseason play in 1981, when the team finished first in the American League East during the second half of the season, and in 1982, when the team made it to the World Series, under the leadership of future Hall of Famers Robin Yount and Paul Molitor. Under Selig's watch, the Brewers also won seven Organization of the Year awards. Selig was part of the owners' collusion in 1985–1987, resulting in the owners paying US$280 million in damages to the players.

Upon his assumption of the commissioner's role, Selig transferred his ownership interest in the Brewers to his daughter Wendy Selig-Prieb in order to remove any technical conflicts of interest, though it was widely presumed he maintained some hand in team operations. Although the team was sold to Los Angeles investor Mark Attanasio in 2005, questions remain regarding Selig's past involvement. Selig's defenders point to the poor management of the team after Selig-Prieb took control as proof that Selig was not working behind the scenes.

Selig was elected to the Wisconsin Athletic Hall of Fame in 2001.

On August 24, 2010, a statue of Selig, the Selig Monument, commissioned by Brewers owner Mark Attanasio and designed by artist Brian Maughan, was unveiled outside Miller Park in Milwaukee.

== Acting Commissioner (1992–1998) ==
Selig became an increasingly vocal opponent of Commissioner Fay Vincent, and soon became the leader of a group of owners seeking his removal. Selig has never stated that the owners colluded, while Vincent has:

The Union basically doesn't trust the ownership because collusion was a US$280 million theft by Selig and Jerry Reinsdorf of that money from the players. I mean, they rigged the signing of free agents. They got caught. They paid $280 million to the players. And I think that's polluted labor relations in baseball ever since it happened. I think it's the reason MLBPA executive director Donald Fehr has no trust in Selig.

— Fay Vincent

Following an 18-9 no-confidence vote, Vincent resigned. Selig had by this time become chairman of the Executive Council of Major League Baseball, and as such became de facto acting commissioner.

His first major act was to institute the Wild Card and divisional playoff play, which has created much controversy amongst baseball fans. Those against the Wild Card see it as diminishing the importance of the pennant race and the regular season, with the true race often being for second rather than first place, while those in favor of it view it as an opportunity for teams to have a shot at the playoffs even when they have no chance of a first-place finish in their division, thus maintaining fan interest later in the season.

Selig suspended Cincinnati Reds owner Marge Schott for a year in 1993 for repeated racially insensitive and prejudicial remarks and actions. The same year, Selig reinstated New York Yankees owner George Steinbrenner from a lifelong suspension that was instituted by Selig's predecessor Fay Vincent. Pete Rose has claimed that he applied for reinstatement over the years and received no such consideration. Rose, along with his close friend and former teammate Mike Schmidt (who is a strong supporter of Rose's reinstatement into baseball), met with Selig in 2002, where Rose privately admitted to Selig (two years before going public with his admission) about betting on baseball. Bud Selig was a close friend of the late Bart Giamatti, who was the commissioner when Rose was first banned from the sport in 1989.

As acting commissioner, Selig represented MLB owners during the 1994 strike. On September 15, he cancelled the World Series, marking the first time the annual event had not been staged since 1904.

While serving as acting commissioner, MLB also implemented interleague play in 1997.

== Commissioner (1998–2015) ==
After a six-year search for a new commissioner, the owners voted to give Selig the title on a permanent basis on July 9, 1998.

During his tenure, MLB avoided additional work stoppages by adopting collective bargaining agreements with its players in 2002 and 2006.

Whereas in the past, the National and American leagues had separate administrative organizations (which, for example, allowed for the introduction of different rules such as the designated hitter), under Selig, Major League Baseball consolidated the administrative functions of both leagues into the Commissioner's Office in 2000. The last official presidents of the NL and AL were Leonard S. Coleman Jr. and Dr. Gene Budig respectively.

=== Reaction after September 11, 2001 ===
On September 11, 2001, Selig ordered all baseball games postponed for a week because of the terror attacks on New York and Washington. The games were postponed not only out of respect and mourning for the victims, but also out of concern for the safety and security of fans and players.

=== 2001 contraction attempt ===
After the conclusion of the 2001 World Series, Selig held a vote on contracting two teams, reportedly the Minnesota Twins and Montreal Expos. This action led to Selig (along with former Expos owner Jeffrey Loria) being sued for racketeering and conspiring with Loria to deliberately defraud the Expos minority owners. If found liable, the league could have been ordered to pay as much as $500 million in total damages. The judge ruled that the Expos could not be moved or contracted until the case was over. The case eventually went to arbitration and was settled out of court for an undisclosed sum.

A week after Selig's announcement, Hennepin County Judge Harry Seymour Crump issued a temporary restraining order that forced the Twins to honor their lease and play the 2002 season at the Metrodome. In August 2002, the effort to contract the Twins officially fizzled as players and owners reached a consensus on a new labor agreement which extended the team's Metrodome lease.

=== Changes to the MLB All-Star Game ===
The 2002 All-Star Game, played in Selig's hometown of Milwaukee, was tied 7–7 after nine innings, and remained tied after the bottom of the 11th inning. Due to the recent managerial trend of granting playing time to as many available players as possible within the regulation nine innings, both managers had used their entire roster. Concerned for the arms of the pitchers currently on the mound, Selig made the controversial decision to declare the game a tie, to the dissatisfaction of the Milwaukee fans. Selig later said that this call was "embarrassing" and that he was "tremendously saddened" by the outcome of the game.

Selig subsequently tried to reinvigorate the All-Star Game by awarding the winning league home-field advantage in the World Series; that practice was initiated in 2003 and continued through 2016. The 2003 All-Star Game had the same U.S. viewership as 2002 (9.5 rating; 17 share) and the ratings declined in 2004 (8.8 rating; 15 share) and 2005 (8.1 rating; 14 share). The American television audience increased in 2006 (9.3 rating; 16 share).

=== Disciplinary actions ===
On July 1, 2005, Selig suspended Texas Rangers pitcher Kenny Rogers for 20 games and fined him US$50,000. The punishment stemmed from an incident on June 29, 2005, during a Rangers pre-game warmup session, where Rogers had shoved two local news reporters and knocked one camera to the ground. One of the reporters resumed filming after picking up said camera, which angered Rogers into shoving him again, after grabbing and throwing the camera to the ground, kicking it. He was then led away by a teammate and later sent home by the club. While an appeal of his suspension was pending, Rogers appeared at the 2005 All-Star Game in Detroit, where fans loudly booed him. On July 22, 2005, Selig heard Rogers' appeal of his suspension. Selig decided to uphold the 20 games, however, an independent arbitrator ruled that Selig had exceeded his authority and reduced it to 13 games, but upheld the fine.

=== Performance-enhancing drugs ===
In 2005, Selig faced Congress on the issue of steroids. After the Congressional hearings in early 2005, and with the scrutiny of the sports and national media upon this issue, Selig put forth a proposal for a stricter performance-enhancing drug testing regime to replace the current system. This proposal also included the banning of amphetamines, a first for the major North American sports leagues. The MLB Players Association and MLB reached an agreement in November on the new policy.

Selig's testimony on the subject has been contradictory. In 2005, Selig told reporters, "I never even heard about them [steroids] until 1998 or 1999. I ran a team and nobody was closer to their players and I never heard any comment from them. It wasn't until 1998 or '99 that I heard the discussion." But a year later, testifying to Congress in 2006, Selig claimed personal credit for spotting the problem early: "In 1994, before anybody was really talking about steroids in baseball, we proposed a program of testing for such substances to the MLBPA. As early as 1998, I began formulating a strategic plan to eliminate the use of performance-enhancing substances from the game." During the 1988 ALCS, Oakland's Jose Canseco had been repeatedly taunted by Boston fans with a chant of "ster-oids, ster-oids, ster-oids." Speaking at the 2013 All-Star Game, Selig complained, "People say, 'Well, you were slow to react.' We were not slow to react. In fact, I heard that this morning, and it aggravated me all over again."

By early 2006, Selig was forced to deal with the issue of steroid use. On March 30, 2006, as a response to the controversy of the use of performance-enhancing drugs and the anticipated career home run record to be set by Barry Bonds, Selig asked former U.S. Senator George J. Mitchell to lead an independent investigation into the use of steroids in baseball's recent past. Joe Sheehan from Baseball Prospectus wrote that the commission has been focusing "blame for the era exclusively on uniformed personnel", and failing to investigate any role played by team ownership and management.

Much controversy surrounded Selig and his involvement in Bonds' all-time home run record chase. For months, speculation surrounded Selig and the possibility that he and Henry Aaron would not attend Bonds' games as he closed in on the record. Selig announced in July 2007 when Bonds was near 755 home runs that he would attend the games. Selig was in attendance for Bonds' record-tying home run against the San Diego Padres, sitting in Padres owner John Moores' private suite. When Bonds hit his 755th home run, Selig refused to applaud Bonds' accomplishment, instead choosing to keep his hands in his pockets and have a look of disdain on his face. Bud Selig also did not attend the San Francisco Giants' game on August 7 when Barry Bonds hit his record-breaking 756th home run against the Washington Nationals; after the event, Selig released a statement congratulating Bonds.

On December 13, 2007, former senator Mitchell released his report on the use of performance-enhancing substances by MLB players. The report names many current and former players who allegedly used performance-enhancing drugs during their careers.

Selig has been widely criticized for not taking an active enough role to stem the tide of steroid use in baseball until it had blossomed into a debilitating problem for the industry. Chicago Sun-Times columnist Jay Mariotti called Selig the "Steroids Commissioner." Selig has been called to Congress several times to testify on performance-enhancing drug use. Congressman Cliff Stearns said in December 2007 that Selig should resign because of use of performance-enhancing drugs in baseball during his tenure.

=== Postseason schedule ===
Selig's decision to extend the traditional postseason schedule into November in an attempt to increase Nielsen ratings was met with widespread disdain, both inside and outside the baseball community. Mike Scioscia, manager of the American League West Division Champion Los Angeles Angels, dismissed the decision, saying: "Ridiculous. I don't know. Can I say it any clearer than that? We should have never had a day off last Wednesday. We should never have three days off after the season. You shouldn't even have two days off after the season."

=== Controversies ===
Selig has been embroiled in a number of controversial decisions during his tenure as commissioner. Notably, he has been accused of favoring the Milwaukee Brewers, his former team, such as he was during the 2001 contraction controversy when it was suggested the Minnesota Twins be one of two teams (the other being the Montreal Expos) to be contracted for economic reasons. Sportswriter Rob Dibble posted an open letter to Bud Selig, criticizing the plan for benefiting only the Brewers, noting that the contraction of the Twins would benefit the Brewers, as they would potentially claim the Twins' share of the upper Midwest market.

During the 2011 Los Angeles Dodgers ownership dispute, he was accused of not acting in good faith towards and treating the Dodgers differently from other teams when he rejected the television deal that Frank McCourt negotiated that intended to bring the franchise out of bankruptcy, claiming McCourt violated the Baseball Agreement. In comparison, no action was taken against New York Mets owner Fred Wilpon despite being in a similar position. United States bankruptcy judge Kevin Gross rendered a stern warning to Selig, stating: "Should the Commissioner falter in proving alleged wrongdoing, the Court may allow LAD (Los Angeles Dodgers) to take further, limited discovery." Some critics have used Selig's handling of the Dodgers to point out a double standard in treatment of MLB owners. More specifically in regards to the Mets, critics have accused Selig of favoritism towards the Mets due to Selig's personal relationship with Wilpon, claiming that it motivated him to stall any possible removal of Wilpon as that club's principal owner.

Selig also notably failed to resolve a 6-year conflict between the San Francisco Giants and the Oakland Athletics regarding the Athletics' proposed move to San Jose. Selig established a blue-ribbon panel in 2009 to resolve the dispute; however, despite years to find a resolution, the blue-ribbon panel completely failed to make any progress toward resolving the issue, leading San Jose to sue MLB. The lawsuit questioned the league's anti-trust exemption and its ability to enforce particular clubs' geographic territories. San Jose's bid for the Athletics ended in 2015 when the United States Supreme Court declined to hear the case. In addition, Selig blocked the sale of the Athletics in 1999 to an ownership group led by Bob Piccinini, then the CEO of Save Mart Supermarkets, and Joe Lacob, who would later purchase Golden State Warriors, from purchasing the Athletics in 2005. Both potential ownership groups were committed to keeping the team in Oakland that would render this territorial dispute meaningless. Instead, Selig permitted only Lew Wolff, his fraternity brother from college, and John J. Fisher to buy the team. The latter has since initiated the process to move the Athletics from Oakland to Las Vegas.

=== Term of service ===
On December 1, 2006, Selig announced that he would be retiring as commissioner of baseball upon the expiration of his contract in 2009. Selig earned $14.5 million from MLB over the timespan October 31, 2005 to October 31, 2006. However, in January 2008, Selig agreed to a three-year contract extension, announcing he planned to retire after the 2012 season. He further decided against retirement, and after a two-year extension for the previous deal was agreed to on January 12, 2012, it was announced that Selig would remain commissioner until the end of the 2014 season.

=== Post-Commissioner Activities ===
In 2021, Selig was appointed as "non-voting co-Chair" (with Jane Forbes Clark) for the December 2021 Early Baseball Era Committee meeting, to consider candidates for election to the Hall of Fame whose major contributions to the game took place prior to 1950. The committee elected Bud Fowler and Buck O'Neil.

== Notable changes to Major League Baseball ==
Bud Selig has overseen the following changes in Major League Baseball:

- Realignment of teams into three divisions per league, and the introduction of playoff wild card teams (1994)
- Interleague play (1997)
- Retired Jackie Robinson's uniform number, 42, across all MLB teams (1997)
- Two additional franchises: the Arizona Diamondbacks and the Tampa Bay Devil Rays, now the Tampa Bay Rays (1998)
- Transfer of the Milwaukee Brewers from the American League to the National League (1998)
- Abolition of the American and National league offices and presidencies, and inclusion of all umpiring crews into a common pool for AL and NL games, instead of having separate pools per league (2000)
- Unbalanced schedule (2001)
- Home field advantage in the World Series granted to the winner of the All Star Game in the same season (2003)
- Transfer of Montreal Expos franchise to Washington, D.C., becoming the Washington Nationals (2004)
- Dedicating April 15 as Jackie Robinson Day (2004)
- Stricter Major League Baseball performance-enhancing drug testing policy (2005)
- World Baseball Classic (2006)
- Introduction of instant replay in the event of a disputed home run call (2008)
- Addition of a second wild-card playoff team in each league (2012)
- Transfer of the Houston Astros from the National League to the American League (2013), as a condition of the sale of the team to Jim Crane, resulting in each league having the same number of teams (15) and interleague play throughout the season
- Expanded instant replay (2014) and the institution of the manager challenge system

During Selig's terms as executive council chairman (from 1992 to 1998) and commissioner, new stadiums opened in Arizona, Atlanta, Cincinnati, Cleveland, Colorado, Detroit, Houston, Miami, Milwaukee, Minneapolis, New York City (Flushing, Queens and the Bronx), Philadelphia, Pittsburgh, San Diego, San Francisco, Seattle, Arlington, St. Louis, and Washington, D.C.

== Israel Baseball League ==
Selig and his family served a supportive role on the advisory board of the Israel Baseball League during its inaugural season in 2007. In response to issues with the league's financial management, after the season, the Selig family requested that their names be removed from the list of board members.

== Selig Experience ==
In May 2015, the Milwaukee Brewers honored Bud Selig with the unveiling of the Selig Experience exhibit at American Family Field (formerly Miller Park.) The Selig Experience is a fifteen-minute documentary showing Bud Selig's life and work for the Milwaukee Brewers.

== Personal life ==
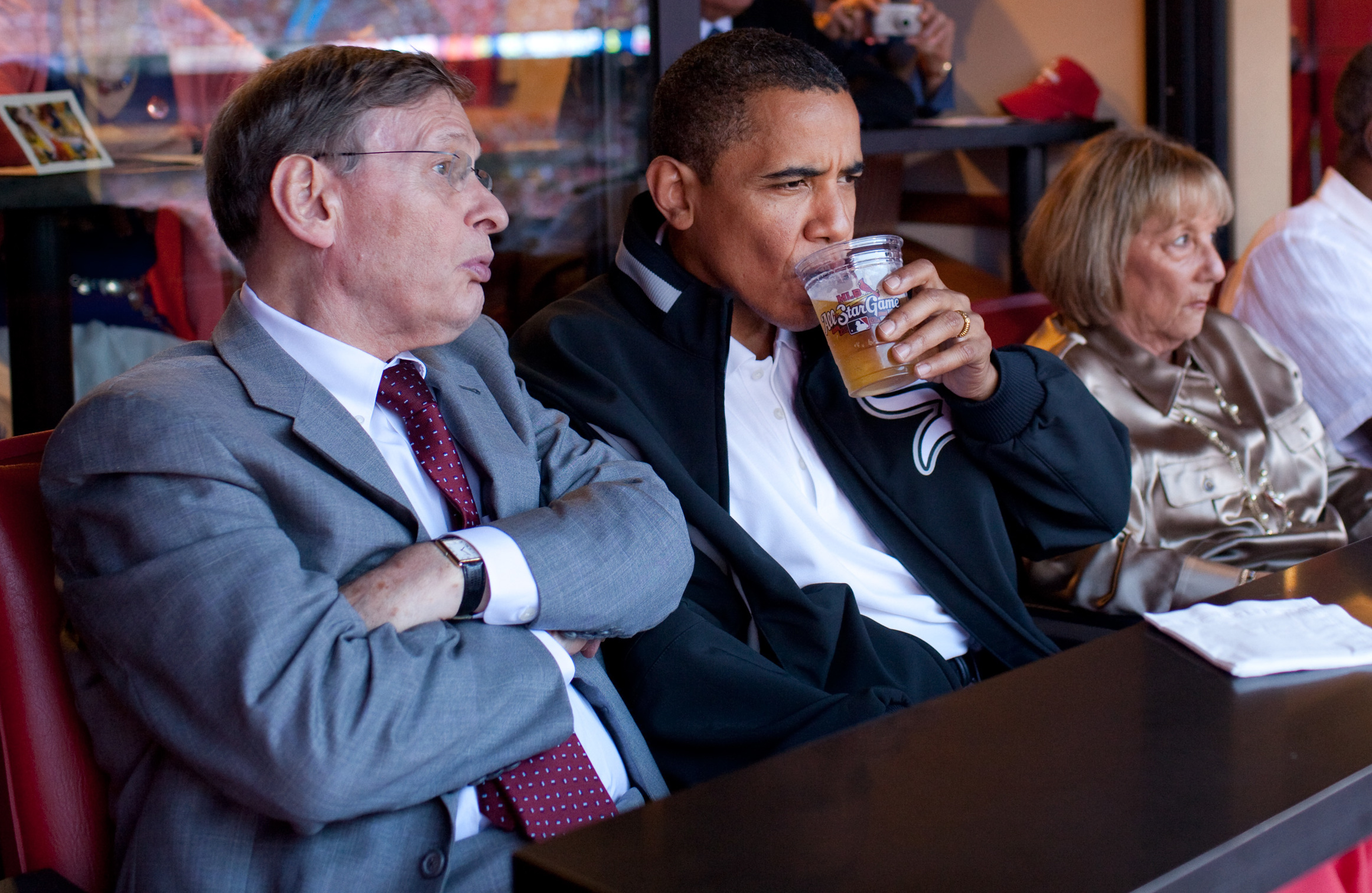
Selig (left) and his wife, Suzanne (right), with Barack Obama at the 2009 Major League Baseball All-Star Game

Selig has been married twice. He married his first wife, Donna Chaimson, in the 1950s, and they had two daughters: Sari (born 1957) and Wendy (born 1960). The couple divorced in 1976 after 19 years of marriage on the grounds that Selig had been "unduly absenting yourself from the home of the parties and isolating yourself ... in pursuit of your baseball interests to the detriment of your marriage." Chaimson later stated that the marriage ended because her husband "divorced me and married baseball." Since 1977, Selig has been married to the former Suzanne Steinman, who has a daughter from a previous marriage.

== Teaching ==
In 2009, Selig began teaching as an adjunct professor of sports law and policy at Marquette University Law School. His classes have covered numerous topics, including "the history of collective bargaining and free agency, baseball's antitrust exemption, revenue sharing – as well as finer points of sports law like intellectual property rights, ambush marketing, and why baseball does not allow game footage on YouTube."

In 2010, Selig endowed the Allan H. Selig Chair in the History of Sport and Society in the United States, as well as a Distinguished Lecture Series in Sport and Society at his alma mater, the University of Wisconsin. The inaugural lecture was given by Adrian Burgos. Selig has since endowed two more chairs in the university's history department.

In February 2016, Selig began teaching at the Sandra Day O'Connor College of Law at Arizona State University. His title at the law school is distinguished professor of sports in America. He is also a lecturer at UW–Madison and Marquette.

== Honors ==
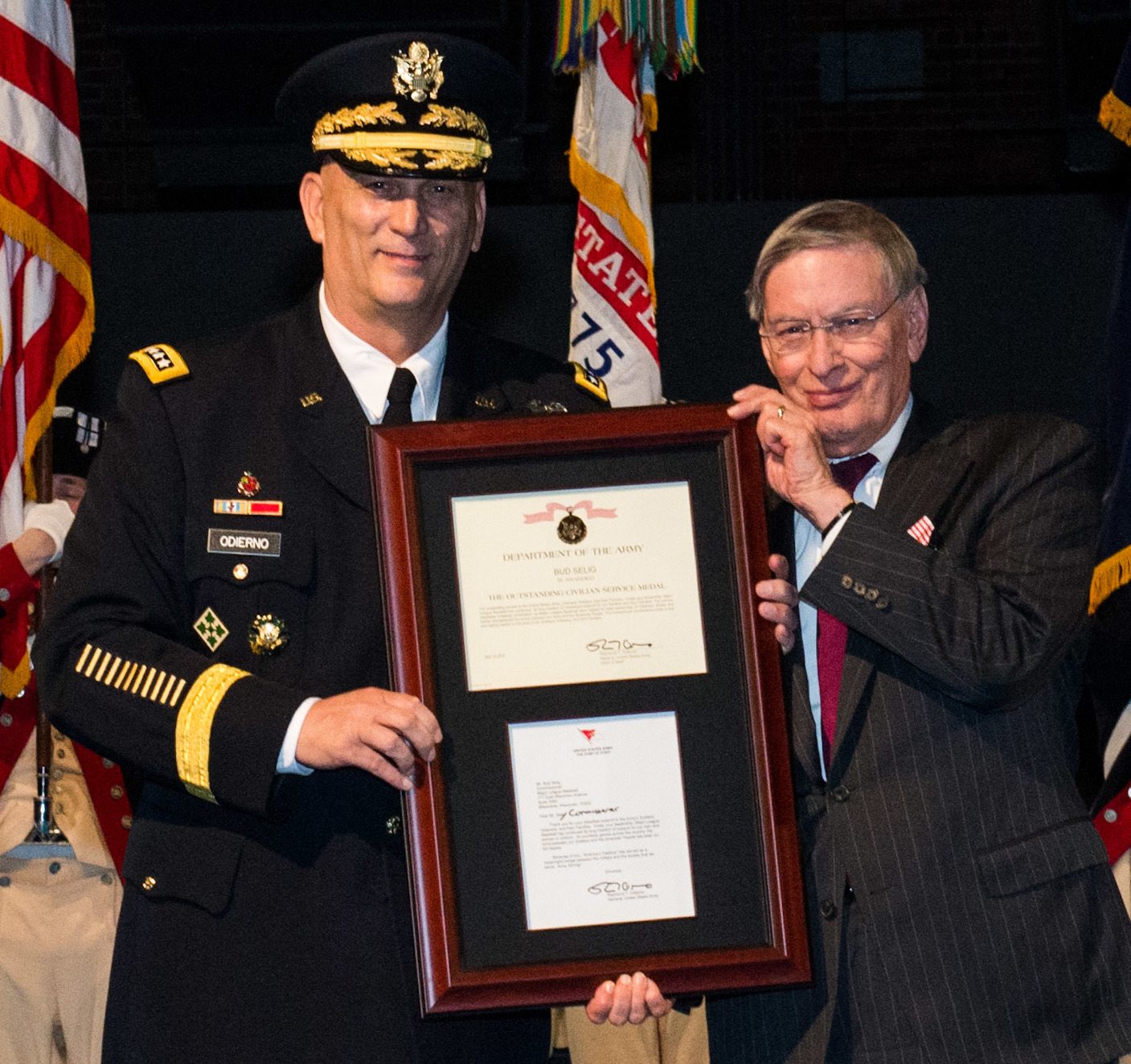
Selig (right) receiving the Outstanding Civilian Service Award from Army Chief of Staff Ray Odierno in 2015

Selig was awarded the U.S. Department of the Army Outstanding Civilian Service Award in April 2015 for supporting soldiers, veterans, and their families through his work in Major League Baseball.

On June 13, 2014, Selig was inducted in the inaugural class of the Brewers Wall of Honor. On April 6, 2015, the Milwaukee Brewers retired uniform number 1 in his honor.

On December 4, 2016, it was announced Selig was elected into the National Baseball Hall of Fame Class of 2017. He was formally inducted on July 30, 2017.

In 2016, Selig was honored with the "Lombardi Award of Excellence" from the Vince Lombardi Cancer Foundation. The award was created to honor Coach Lombardi's legacy, and is awarded annually to an individual who exemplifies the spirit of the Coach.

== Publications ==
- For the Good of the Game: The Inside Story of the Surprising and Dramatic Transformation of Major League Baseball, with Phil Rogers. United States: HarperCollins, 2019.
- Foreword to American Jews and America's Game: Voices of a Growing Legacy in Baseball by Larry Ruttman. Lincoln, Nebraska and London, England: University of Nebraska Press, 2013.
- Special introduction to The Plan Epstein, Maddon, and the Audacious Blueprint for a Cubs Dynasty by David Kaplan. United States: Triumph Books, 2017.

== See also ==
- Selig v. United States

Sporting positions
New office	Owner of the Milwaukee Brewers franchise 1970–1998	Succeeded by Wendy Selig-Prieb
Honorary titles
New title	Commissioner Emeritus of Baseball; 2015–present	Incumbent
