= Important Intangible Cultural Properties =

Important Intangible Cultural Properties may refer to:

- Important Intangible Cultural Properties of Japan based on the 1950 Japanese law
- Important Intangible Cultural Properties of Korea based on the Cultural Property Protection Law of Korea passed in 1962
- Intangible Cultural Heritage of the Philippines listed by the National Commission for Culture and the Arts
- UNESCO Intangible Cultural Heritage Lists
