= Mark Attanasio =

American businessman (born 1957)

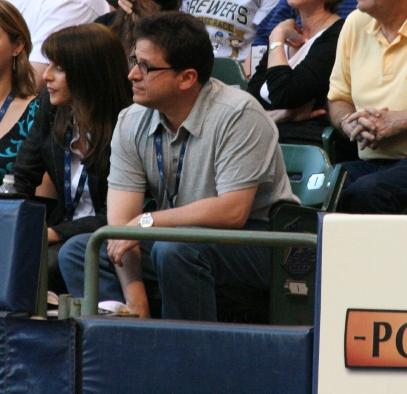
- Attanasio in April 2012
- Born: Mark L. Attanasio; September 29, 1957 (age 69); New York City, U.S.
- Occupation: Businessman
- Spouse: Deborah Kaplan
- Children: 2
- Relatives: Paul Attanasio (brother); Annabelle Attanasio (niece)

Mark L. Attanasio (born September 29, 1957) is an American businessman who is currently the principal owner of the Milwaukee Brewers baseball team and the majority shareholder of English football club Norwich City. As of 2026, he is worth an estimated $1.9 billion.

== Early life ==
Mark L. Attanasio was born in the Bronx borough of New York City on September 29, 1957, the son of real estate broker Connie and commercial consultant Joseph Attanasio. His great-grandparents were Italian immigrants from Positano. His younger brother, Paul Attanasio, is a screenwriter and producer; Paul's daughter, Annabelle Attanasio, is an actress and filmmaker. Attanasio grew up in Tenafly, New Jersey, where he graduated from Tenafly High School in 1975. He graduated from Brown University with a BA in 1979 and received his JD from Columbia Law School in 1982.

== Career ==
=== Finance ===
Attanasio co-founded and served as a senior executive at the Los Angeles alternative investment firm Crescent Capital Group in 1991, which was later bought by Trust Company of the West in 1995. In 2001, he joined the board of directors at the telecommunications firm Global Crossing, which filed for bankruptcy in January 2002. He resigned his position on the board shortly thereafter.

=== Milwaukee Brewers ===
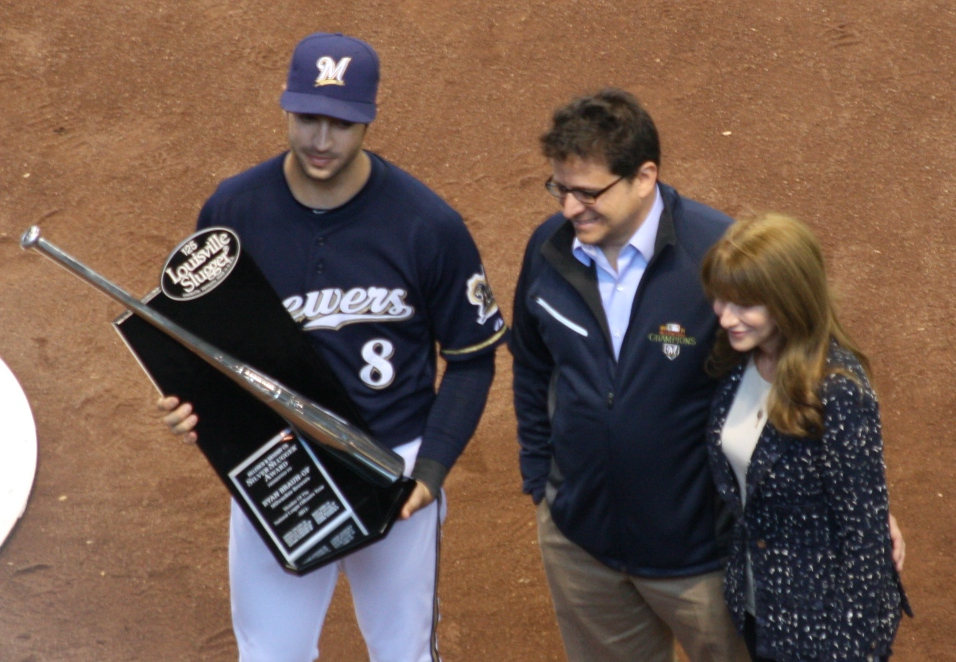
Attanasio presenting a 2011 Silver Slugger Award to Ryan Braun

In September 2004, Attanasio reached a deal on behalf of an investment group to purchase the Milwaukee Brewers from MLB commissioner Bud Selig's family for an estimated $223 million. The deal was approved by MLB in 2005.

In 2023, the Brewers reached an agreement with Wisconsin lawmakers for taxpayers to subsidize renovations of the Brewers' stadium American Family Field for around $500 million. In the lead-up to the agreement, Brewers officials threatened to leave Milwaukee unless the team received taxpayer money.

Under Attanasio's ownership, the Brewers experienced one of the most prolonged streaks of success in MLB history. It started with the 2008 acquisition of CC Sabathia, leading to the Brewers' first playoff berth since reaching the 1982 World Series; reaching the 2011 NLCS; securing playoff berths every year from 2018-2026 except 2022; and winning the World Series for the first time in franchise history in 2026.

=== Norwich City ===
In August 2022, it was announced that Attanasio would become a director of English football team Norwich City, which he called his proudest achievement. It was later reported that he would be purchasing an 18% stake in the club from Michael Foulger under the business group Norfolk Holdings. In April 2024, Attanasio’s stake in the club was increased to 40.4% following EFL ratification, making him one of the joint majority shareholders alongside Delia Smith and Michael Wynn-Jones.

On 23 October 2024, Attanasio & Norfolk Holdings became the sole majority shareholders of the club, after the club’s other shareholders approved a deal that saw their stake in the club increase to 85% and decrease Smith & Wynn-Jones’s stake to 10%. As part of the deal, Attanasio appointed businessman Richard Ressler to the board as a club director, while Smith & Wynn-Jones agreed to step down from their roles as club directors to become honorary life presidents.

=== Other work ===
Along with Brewers assistant general manager Gord Ash and former Brewers pitcher Ben Sheets, Attanasio is also a part-owner of the American Hockey League's Milwaukee Admirals.

He was a major sponsor of the widely acclaimed Andy Warhol exhibition at the Milwaukee Art Museum.

He is also on the board of directors for LA28.

== Personal life ==
Attanasio is married to Deborah Kaplan, with whom he has two sons.

== See also ==
- List of Major League Baseball principal owners

Business positions
Preceded by Wendy Selig-Prieb	Owner of the Milwaukee Brewers franchise 2004–present	Incumbent
