= Wendy Selig-Prieb =

American baseball executive (born 1960)

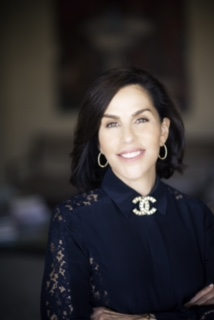
- Born: Wendy Selig; 1960 (age 65–66); Milwaukee, Wisconsin, U.S.
- Education: University School of Milwaukee
- Alma mater: Tufts University (B.A.); Marquette University Law School (J.D.)
- Occupation: Baseball executive
- Known for: Principal owner of the Milwaukee Brewers (1998–2004)
- Spouse: Laurel Prieb
- Children: 1
- Parents: Bud Selig (father); Donna Chaimson (mother)

Wendy Selig-Prieb (born 1960) is an American businesswoman who was once the principal owner and president of the Milwaukee Brewers organization. She is the daughter of former MLB commissioner Bud Selig.

== Biography ==
Selig-Prieb graduated from Tufts University in 1982, and earned her Juris Doctor from Marquette University Law School in 1988, she worked as a corporate attorney for Foley & Lardner before joining the Brewers.

Upon his assumption of the commissioner's role, Bud Selig transferred his ownership interest in the Brewers to his daughter, Wendy Selig-Prieb in order to remove any technical conflicts of interest, though it was widely presumed he maintained some hand in team operations. Although the team was sold to Los Angeles investor Mark Attanasio in 2005, questions remain regarding Selig's past involvement. Selig's defenders point to the poor management of the team after Selig-Prieb took control as proof that Selig was not working behind the scenes.

During her tenure as an executive with the Brewers, Selig-Prieb was the only female president and chairman of a Major League Baseball Club. As part of management's Labor Committee in 1994–1995, Selig-Prieb was the first woman to represent Major League Baseball in its collective bargaining with the MLB Players Association. She served on numerous other committees for Baseball and represented the Brewers at Major League meetings from September 1992-January 2005.

As of 2014 Selig-Prieb served on the board of directors of Delaware North, a Buffalo, New York-based hospitality company. She is also a director of Worth LTD, a direct-to-consumer fashion company. As of 2015 Selig-Prieb also served on the board of directors of Worth.

Prior to assuming this position, Selig-Prieb spent two years as president of Worth New York, the flagship brand of Worth.

In 2024, Selig-Prieb was the executive producer of a documentary, See Her Be Her. She continues to advocate for women in sports and business.

== Personal life ==
Selig-Prieb is married to Laurel Prieb, former vice president of Western operations and special projects for Major League Baseball, and former vice president of marketing for the Milwaukee Brewers. The couple have one daughter, journalist Natalie Prieb.

Wendy was born in 1960 in Milwaukee, Wisconsin to Donna Chaimson and Bud Selig. She has a sister, Sari Selig-Kramer, and a stepsister from her father's second marriage, Lisa Steinman.

== See also ==
- List of female Major League Baseball principal owners

Business positions
Preceded by Bud Selig	President, CEO and Chairman of the Milwaukee Brewers franchise 1998–2004	Succeeded by Mark Attanasio
