= Robert D. Beyer =

American businessman

- Born: December 25, 1959 (age 66)
- Education: University of Southern California (BS); UCLA Anderson School of Management (MBA)
- Occupations: Chairman of Chaparal Investments LLC; Executive Chairman of Crescent Acquisition Corp.
- Spouse: Catherine
- Children: 4

Robert D. Beyer (born December 25, 1959) is an American investor and executive. He is currently Chairman of Chaparal Investments LLC, a private investment firm and diversified holding company with interests in both financial and operating assets. Previously, he was Executive Chairman of Crescent Acquisition Corp, a publicly traded blank check company that merged with LiveVox Holdings, Inc. in 2021. He was Chief Executive Officer and a director of TCW Group (parent company of Trust Company of the West) from 2005 until 2009, a diversified investment management firm with assets in excess of $150 billion; he previously served as president and Chief Investment Officer from 2000 until 2005.

In 1991, Beyer co-founded Crescent Capital Corporation (now Crescent Capital Group), an investment management firm that was acquired by TCW in 1995. During his investment career, Beyer has been responsible for the management of large, diversified and global businesses overseeing the management of more than 1500 employees and 100 different investment strategies, and has also directly managed various public and private fixed income and alternative investment portfolios.

From 1983 until 1991, Beyer was an investment banker and capital markets professional at Bear, Stearns & Co. and Drexel Burnham Lambert. At Drexel, he worked directly under Michael Milken, a pioneer in the financing of American businesses. Beyer was one of the individuals responsible for managing Drexel through its bankruptcy in 1990 and 1991.

Beyer is an independent director of Jefferies Financial Group (NYSE: JEF) and LiveVox Holdings, Inc. (NASDAQ: LVOX). From 1999 until 2019, he was a director of The Kroger Co. (NYSE: KR) where he served as Lead Independent Director and from 2006 until 2016, he was a director of The Allstate Corporation (NYSE: ALL) where he served on the executive committee of the board. In 2008, he was selected as an Outstanding Director by his peers as part of the Outstanding Directors Program of the Financial Times. Beyer serves as a trustee of The University of Southern California and Harvard-Westlake School, where he is a former board chair. He previously served on the Board of Advisors at UCLA Anderson School of Management where he was also board chair and was selected as one of the "100 Inspirational Alumni." Beyer received The 2013 John E. Anderson Distinguished Alumni Award. Beyer is also a member and former chair of the Board of Councilors of the USC Dornsife College of Letters, Arts & Sciences. From 2011 until 2013, Beyer served on the Los Angeles Board of Airport Commissioners.

Beyer has endowed both the Robert D. Beyer '83 Term Chair in Management at UCLA and the Robert D. Beyer ('81) Early Career Chair in Natural Sciences at USC.

Beyer is an investor in and a member of the advisory board of The Milwaukee Brewers Baseball Club.

Beyer received his BS from the University of Southern California business school in 1981 and his MBA from the UCLA Anderson School of Management in 1983. He lives in Los Angeles and Sun Valley with his wife, Catherine, and they have four adult children.
