= 1977 Toronto Blue Jays season =

1977 Toronto Blue Jays
- League: American League
- Division: East
- Ballpark: Exhibition Stadium
- City: Toronto
- Record: 54–107 (.335)
- Divisional place: 7th
- Owners: Labatt Breweries, Imperial Trust, Canadian Imperial Bank of Commerce
- General managers: Peter Bavasi
- Managers: Roy Hartsfield
- Television: CBC Television (Don Chevrier, Tony Kubek, Tom McKee)
- Radio: CKFH (Early Wynn, Tom Cheek)

The 1977 Toronto Blue Jays season was the first season of Major League Baseball played by the Toronto-based expansion franchise. The Blue Jays finished seventh in the American League East with a record of 54 wins and 107 losses, 45½ games behind the World Champion New York Yankees.

== Offseason ==
=== Transactions ===
Transactions by the Toronto Blue Jays during the off-season before the 1977 season.

==== October 1976 ====
October 21	Acquired Phil Roof from the Chicago White Sox for a player to be named later (Larry Anderson on January 5, 1977).
October 22	Purchased Dave Roberts from the San Diego Padres. Purchased Dave Hilton from the San Diego Padres. Purchased John Scott from the San Diego Padres.

==== November 1976 ====
November 5	Participated in the 1976 Major League Baseball expansion draft Players acquired, in order of draft: Bob Bailor from the Baltimore Orioles; Jerry Garvin from the Minnesota Twins; Jim Clancy from the Texas Rangers; Gary Woods from the Oakland Athletics; Rico Carty from the Cleveland Indians; Butch Edge from the Milwaukee Brewers; Al Fitzmorris from the Kansas City Royals; Alvis Woods from the Minnesota Twins; Mike Darr from the Baltimore Orioles; Pete Vuckovich from the Chicago White Sox; Jeff Byrd from the Texas Rangers; Steve Bowling from the Milwaukee Brewers; Dennis DeBarr from the Detroit Tigers; Bill Singer from the Minnesota Twins; Jim Mason from the New York Yankees; Doug Ault from the Texas Rangers; Ernie Whitt from the Boston Red Sox; Mike Weathers from the Oakland Athletics; Steve Staggs from the Kansas City Royals; Steve Hargan from the Texas Rangers; Garth Iorg from the New York Yankees; Dave Lemanczyk from the Detroit Tigers; Larry Anderson from the Milwaukee Brewers; Jesse Jefferson from the Chicago White Sox; Dave McKay from the Minnesota Twins; Tom Bruno from the Kansas City Royals; Otto Velez from the New York Yankees; Mike Willis from the Baltimore Orioles; Sam Ewing from the Chicago White Sox; Leon Hooten from the Oakland Athletics
November 5	Purchased Chuck Hartenstein from the San Diego Padres. Acquired Alan Ashby and Doug Howard from the Cleveland Indians for Al Fitzmorris.

==== December 1976 ====
December 6	Acquired Rick Cerone and John Lowenstein from the Cleveland Indians for Rico Carty.

==== January 1977 ====
January 1	Signed free agent Lloyd Allen from the St. Louis Cardinals to a contract.
January 3	Signed free agent Pedro García from the Detroit Tigers to a contract.
January 5	Sent Larry Anderson to the Chicago White Sox to complete the October 21 trade for Phil Roof.

==== February 1977 ====
February 16	Acquired Jerry Johnson from the San Diego Padres for Dave Roberts.
February 24	Acquired Ron Fairly from the Oakland Athletics for Mike Weathers and cash.

==== March 1977 ====
March 21	Purchased Ken Reynolds from the San Diego Padres.
March 29	Acquired Héctor Torres from the Cleveland Indians for John Lowenstein. Released Lloyd Allen, Leon Hooten and Doug Howard.
March 31	Released Ken Reynolds.

=== Spring training ===
The team had announced on August 26, 1976, that they had selected Dunedin, Florida as its base for spring training. Dunedin was a 30-minute drive from the Tampa airport with daily flights to and from Toronto, and was near other spring training sites including the Philadelphia Phillies in Clearwater, the New York Mets and St. Louis Cardinals in St. Petersburg, the Cincinnati Reds in Tampa, and the Pittsburgh Pirates in Bradenton.

Dunedin's Grant Field was located near the downtown and had been used in the 1950s and 1960s by AAA minor league clubs for spring training. The city improved the ballpark with new seats, fences, and clubhouses, increasing seating from approximately 1,200 to 2,000.

The Blue Jays' first exhibition game was scheduled for March 10, 1977 against the Philadelphia Phillies, but was cancelled due to rain. Instead, the first game was March 11, 1977 against the New York Mets. Wire services reported, "Spectators who arrived too late to purchase tickets inhabited areas down both foul lines, outside the outfield fences and some even took seats in the Babe Ruth League grandstand located down the right field line, some 500 feet away from home plate." Bill Singer started the game for the Blue Jays and surrendered a lead off home run to the Mets' Lee Mazzilli. However, the Blue Jays came back and won 3–1 in front of 1,988 fans.

The first two times they played the Montreal Expos, the Blue Jays were triumphant as well. Perhaps the highlight of spring training was a game against the Cincinnati Reds. The Blue Jays defeated the defending World Series champions with the Reds missing only one regular starter from their lineup. After spring training, the Blue Jays 25-man roster was set. Ron Fairly, who had previously played for the Montreal Expos, was one of the most recognizable players on the nascent team. The only marquee name was Bill Singer, a pitcher who won 20 games with the Los Angeles Dodgers in 1969 and threw a no-hitter in 1970. Pat Gillick had worked out a deal with the New York Yankees to trade Singer for promising young left-hander Ron Guidry. Blue Jays president Peter Bavasi vetoed the deal, as Singer was part of his plan to market and promote the team.

== Regular season ==
=== The first game ===
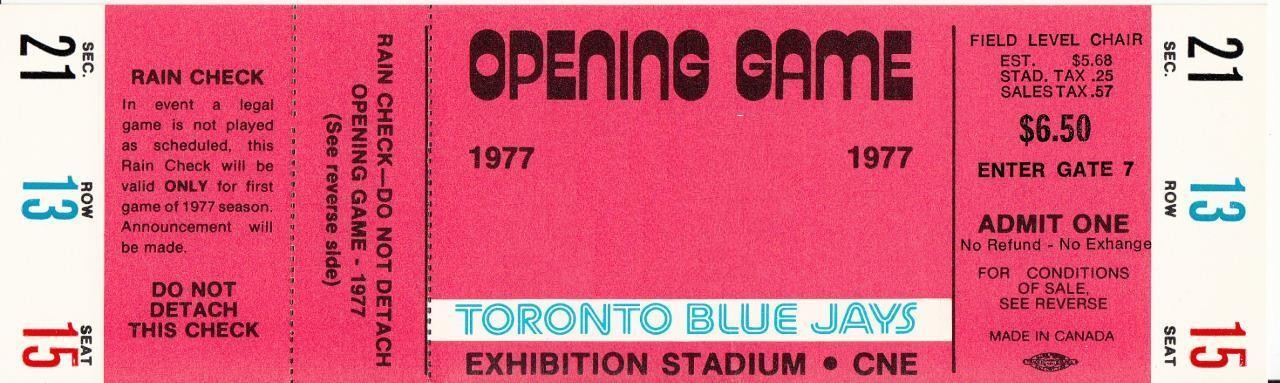
A ticket from the Blue Jays' first regular season game.

On April 7, 1977, 44,649 fans attended the first game in Toronto Blue Jays franchise history, as the squad hosted the Chicago White Sox. Notables in attendance that day included Metro Toronto chairman Paul Godfrey, Toronto mayor David Crombie, legendary NHL broadcaster Foster Hewitt, and country singer Anne Murray. Besides the snow that adorned the field, hundreds of fans missed the first pitch because they were stuck in traffic. An enduring image was the Chicago catcher, Jim Essian, using his shin pads to ski around on the field by their dugout with bats used as poles before the game started.

The umpires for the game included crew chief Nestor Chylak, Joe Brinkman, Rich Garcia, and 27-year-old Steve Palermo, who was making his major-league debut. The game was broadcast on the CBC with Tom McKee (host), Don Chevrier (play-by-play) and New York Yankees legend Whitey Ford providing the commentary and analysis. McKee was the initial face and voice to appear on that inaugural Blue Jays telecast. The Blue Jays would appear on the CBC only 16 times that first season. Tom Cheek and analyst Early Wynn called the game on the radio, this being the first of 4,306 consecutive games Cheek would call.

As the snow was squeegeed off the field (via a Zamboni on loan from the Toronto Maple Leafs), the 48th Highlanders marched onto the field to perform the Star Spangled Banner. Canadian country star Murray, wearing a red parka, then sang O Canada.

The fans chanted "We want beer," because Toronto's Exhibition Stadium was the only ballpark in the major leagues to not serve beer. This was essentially a political protest, since all Ontario stadia were forbidden by law at that time from selling alcoholic beverages. It would take more than five years of lobbying and petitioning from Blue Jays owners Labatt and other interested parties before the Legislative Assembly of Ontario legalized beer sales in the middle of the 1982 season.

Bill Singer threw the first pitch in Toronto Blue Jays history to Ralph Garr of the White Sox, a high fastball called for a strike. From an 0–2 count, Garr battled back to 3–2, then drew a walk. Afterwards, Garr stole second base, advancing to third when catcher Rick Cerone's throw went into centre field. Shortstop Alan Bannister then hit a fly ball for the first out of the game. Jorge Orta followed with a sacrifice fly to cash in Garr, who scored the first run in Exhibition Stadium history. Richie Zisk then hit the first home run at The Ex, making the score 2–0, White Sox. Blue Jays manager Roy Hartsfield went to the mound to talk to Singer as reliever Jerry Johnson started warming up in the bullpen. Singer was able to compose himself, getting Eric Soderholm to hit into a fielder's choice to end the inning.

Outfielder John Scott was the first Blue Jays player to have an at bat, facing White Sox pitcher Ken Brett, taking a strike on the first pitch thrown to him. He struck out, as did the next batter, Héctor Torres. Up came first baseman Doug Ault, a 27-year-old career minor-leaguer with only nine games' experience in the majors with the Texas Rangers and the Blue Jays' 16th pick in the expansion draft. On a 1–1 pitch, Ault slugged the first home run (and first hit) in Blue Jay history deep to left-centre. The score was now 2–1, Chicago.

The Chisox scored two runs in the top of the second, increasing their lead to 4–1. In the bottom of the second, Gary Woods bunted for a single, stole second, and scored on a single to right field by Pedro García. In the third inning, Torres singled and Ault was back at the plate. With the count 1–1, Ault hit his second home run down the right field line, and the game was tied at 4 runs apiece. Toronto took their first lead in the fourth when Dave McKay singled in García from second base.

Singer struck out Chet Lemon to start the fifth inning, but Brian Downing and Ralph Garr singled off him. Hartsfield came out to the mound to make a pitching change. Singer left to a standing ovation as Jerry Johnson entered the game. Johnson recorded the final two outs of the fifth. In his first major-league at bat, Al Woods pinch hit for Steve Bowling in the bottom of the fifth. With Otto Vélez at second base, Woods homered to right field. The score was now 7–4 in favour of Toronto, the team having scored in every inning to that point.

The Sox scored a run in the sixth inning, making the score 7–5. Pete Vuckovich entered in relief of Johnson to begin the eighth. He struck out two batters, gave up a walk and a single, but got a ground ball to end the inning. In the bottom of the inning, Ault returned to the plate and singled in another run to make the score 8–5. Another run scored on a double play ground out, making the score 9–5, Blue Jays.

In the top of the ninth, Vuckovich retired Jorge Orta on a ground ball, then struck out Richie Zisk. For the day, Zisk had four hits in five at bats. With one out to go for the win, Jim Spencer hit a line drive to left field but Scott dropped the ball for a two-base error. Oscar Gamble subsequently grounded out to the shortstop, at which the Blue Jays had won their first game in franchise history. Jerry Johnson picked up the win while Vuckovich earned the save.

The heroes of opening day would not have a future with the Jays. Jerry Johnson retired after the '77 season and would end up in Hollywood working as a stuntman. At the 1977 Winter Meetings, Toronto traded Vuckovich to the St. Louis Cardinals in exchange for Tom Underwood. After seeing sporadic playing time in 1978, Doug Ault spent all of 1979 in the minors.

==== Linescore ====
April 7, Exhibition Stadium, Toronto, Ontario

Team	1	2	3	4	5	6	7	8	9	R	H	E
Chicago	2	2	0	0	0	1	0	0	0	5	15	0
Toronto	1	1	2	1	2	0	0	2	0	9	16	1
W: Jerry Johnson (1–0) L: Ken Brett (0–1)
HRs: Doug Ault (2), Alvis Woods (1), Richie Zisk (1)

==== Boxscore ====
===== Batting =====
Chicago White Sox	AB	R	H	RBI	Toronto Blue Jays	AB	R	H	RBI
Garr, lf	5	2	3	0	Scott, lf	5	1	1	0
Bannister, ss	5	0	1	1	Torres, ss	2	1	1	0
Nyman, ph	1	0	0	0	Mason, ph/ss	1	1	0	0
Nordbrook, ss	0	0	0	0	Ault, 1b	4	2	3	4
Orta, 2b	4	0	0	1	Vélez, dh	4	1	2	0
Zisk, rf	6	2	4	2	G. Woods, cf	5	1	1	0
Spencer, 1b	6	0	2	0	Bowling, rf	2	0	0	0
Gamble, dh	3	0	0	0	A. Woods, ph, rf	3	1	1	2
Soderholm, 3b	5	0	2	1	García, 2b	4	1	3	1
Lemon, cf	4	0	0	0	McKay, 3b	4	0	2	1
Downing, c	4	1	3	0	Cerone, c	6	0	2	0
Totals	43	5	15	5	Totals	38	9	16	8

===== Pitching =====
Chicago White Sox	IP	H	R	ER	BB	SO
Brett, L (0–1)	3.0	9	5	5	0	4
Barrios	3.0	3	2	2	3	1
Hamilton	1.0	3	2	2	0	1
LaGrow	1.0	1	0	0	0	1
Totals	8.0	16	9	9	3	7

Toronto Blue Jays	IP	H	R	ER	BB	SO
Singer	4.1	11	4	3	3	5
Johnson W (1–0)	2.2	3	1	1	3	1
Vuckovich, SV (1)	2.0	1	0	0	1	3
Totals	9.0	15	5	4	7	9

=== April ===
The Blue Jays finished their first homestand with a 5–2 record, sitting in first place in the American League East by 0.5 games, as the team took two of three against the Chicago White Sox and three of four from the Detroit Tigers. Pitcher Jerry Garvin picked up two of Toronto's five wins.

The Blue Jays struggled on their first road trip, as they were swept in a three-game series by the Chicago White Sox and split a four-game series with the New York Yankees, returning home with a 7–7 record.

On April 27, the Blue Jays were involved in their first extra innings game, defeating the Cleveland Indians 6–5 in 12 innings.

The Jays finished the month in fifth place with a 10–11 record, three games out of first place. Jerry Garvin had an impressive 4–0 record with a 2.14 ERA. Outfielder Otto Vélez hit .442 with five home runs and 18 RBI and was named American League Player of the Month.

=== May ===
On May 4, the Blue Jays scored 10 runs in a game for the first time in team history, thumping the Milwaukee Brewers 10–3 at Exhibition Stadium. The team would score 10 runs again five nights later on May 9 in a 10–4 win over their expansion cousins, the Seattle Mariners.

On May 14, the Jays allowed double digits in runs for the first time, losing 13–3 to the Minnesota Twins.

Toronto struggled during the month of May, posting a record of 8–17. Following a 6–5 loss to the Oakland Athletics on May 25, the Blue Jays fell into last place in the American League East for the first time.

=== June ===
After losing their first two games in June, the Blue Jays would win five of their next six, the only blemish being a 2–1 loss in 13 innings to the California Angels. Following that, Toronto would win only two of their next 14 games.

On June 27, Ron Guidry of the New York Yankees was carrying a no-hitter into the fifth inning when he walked the bases loaded, then gave up a grand slam to light-hitting Hector Torres, which vaulted the Jays to a 7–6 victory. During the month, Toronto had a 10–17 record, bringing their overall record to 28–45, seventh place in the American League East.

=== July ===
The Blue Jays played their first Canada Day game on July 1, losing to the Texas Rangers 11–8 at Exhibition Stadium.

They went into the All-Star break with a 34–58 record, 19 games out of first place. At the 1977 Major League Baseball All-Star Game held at Yankee Stadium in New York City on July 19, first baseman Ron Fairly was the only Blue Jays representative. He struck out in his only at-bat against Tom Seaver.

After the All-Star break, the Blue Jays' struggles continued, losing eight games in a row before ending the month with a win over the Milwaukee Brewers. Toronto went 7–21 in July, bringing their overall record to 35–66; 24 games out of first place.

=== August ===
On August 9, the Blue Jays defeated the Minnesota Twins 6–2 in front of 23,450 fans at Exhibition Stadium, as the franchise broke the single-season record for attendance by an expansion team. Despite that, August proved to be another tough month for the club. Toronto went 10–18, bringing their record to 45–84 for the season, 32.5 games out of first place. The Blue Jays lost their last five games in August.

=== September/October ===
Toronto began September with six losses in a row, bringing their overall losing streak to 11 games, before defeating the Boston Red Sox 3–2 on September 7.

On September 10, Roy Howell drove in a club record nine runs in a 19–3 win over the New York Yankees at Yankee Stadium. This marked the Yankees worst home loss in over 50 years.

At home on September 15, the Blue Jays earned a 9–0 forfeit victory over the Baltimore Orioles when, in the fifth inning, Orioles manager Earl Weaver removed his club from the field in a dispute over a tarp on the bullpen mounds. It marked the first (and still the only) time since 1914 that an MLB team has deliberately forfeited a game.

The Blue Jays inaugural season came to a close on October 2, as they split a doubleheader against the Cleveland Indians in front of 27,789 fans at Exhibition Stadium, bringing their total attendance to 1,701,052, an MLB record for an expansion team.

Toronto finished the year in last place in the American League East with a 54–107 record, 45.5 games behind the first place New York Yankees. The Blue Jays also finished 9.5 games worse than their expansion cousins, the Seattle Mariners, who went 64–98. The Blue Jays attained success far sooner than the Mariners; Toronto's first winning season took place in 1983, while Seattle failed to post a winning season until 1991.

=== Season standings ===
AL East
Team	W	L	Pct.	GB	Home	Road
New York Yankees	100	62	.617	—	55‍–‍26	45‍–‍36
Baltimore Orioles	97	64	.602	2½	54‍–‍27	43‍–‍37
Boston Red Sox	97	64	.602	2½	51‍–‍29	46‍–‍35
Detroit Tigers	74	88	.457	26	39‍–‍42	35‍–‍46
Cleveland Indians	71	90	.441	28½	37‍–‍44	34‍–‍46
Milwaukee Brewers	67	95	.414	33	37‍–‍44	30‍–‍51
Toronto Blue Jays	54	107	.335	45½	25‍–‍55	29‍–‍52

=== Record vs. opponents ===
1977 American League record Sources:
Team	BAL	BOS	CAL	CWS	CLE	DET	KC	MIL	MIN	NYY	OAK	SEA	TEX	TOR
Baltimore	—	6–8	5–6	5–5	11–4	12–3	4–7	11–4	6–4	8–7	8–2	7–3	4–6	10–5
Boston	8–6	—	7–3	3–7	8–7	9–6	5–5	9–6	4–6	8–7	8–3	10–1	6–4	12–3
California	6–5	3–7	—	8–7	6–4	4–6	6–9	5–5	7–8	4–7	5–10	9–6	5–10	6–4
Chicago	5–5	7–3	7–8	—	6–4	4–6	8–7	6–5	10–5	3–7	10–5	10–5	6–9	8–3
Cleveland	4–11	7–8	4–6	4–6	—	8–7	3–7	11–4	2–9	3–12	7–3	7–3	2–9	9–5
Detroit	3–12	6–9	6–4	6–4	7–8	—	3–8	10–5	5–5	6–9	5–5	5–6	2–8	10–5
Kansas City	7–4	5–5	9–6	7–8	7–3	8–3	—	8–2	10–5	5–5	9–6	11–4	8–7	8–2
Milwaukee	4–11	6–9	5–5	5–6	4–11	5–10	2–8	—	3–8	8–7	5–5	7–3	5–5	8–7
Minnesota	4–6	6–4	8–7	5–10	9–2	5–5	5–10	8–3	—	2–8	8–6	7–8	8–7	9–1
New York	7–8	7–8	7–4	7–3	12–3	9–6	5–5	7–8	8–2	—	9–2	6–4	7–3	9–6
Oakland	2–8	3–8	10–5	5–10	3–7	5–5	6–9	5–5	6–8	2–9	—	7–8	2–13	7–3
Seattle	3–7	1–10	6–9	5–10	3–7	6–5	4–11	3–7	8–7	4–6	8–7	—	9–6	4–6
Texas	6–4	4–6	10–5	9–6	9–2	8–2	7–8	5–5	7–8	3–7	13–2	6–9	—	7–4
Toronto	5–10	3–12	4–6	3–8	5–9	5–10	2–8	7–8	1–9	6–9	3–7	6–4	4–7	—

=== Transactions ===
Transactions for the Toronto Blue Jays during the 1977 regular season.

==== April 1977 ====
April 14	Signed amateur free agent Paul Hodgson.

==== May 1977 ====
May 9	Acquired Roy Howell from the Texas Rangers for Steve Hargan, Jim Mason and $200,000.

==== June 1977 ====
June 8	Purchased Doug Rader from the San Diego Padres.
June 17	Signed free agent Greg Wells from the Cleveland Indians to a contract.
June 27	Released Pedro García.

==== July 1977 ====
July 27	Purchased Tom Murphy from the Boston Red Sox.

==== August 1977 ====
August 30	Purchased Tim Nordbrook from the Chicago White Sox.

==== September 1977 ====
September 2	Claimed John Hale off of waivers from the Los Angeles Dodgers.
September 14	Traded John Hale to the Seattle Mariners for cash.

=== Roster ===
1977 Toronto Blue Jays
Roster
Pitchers: 21 Tom Bruno; 27 Jeff Byrd; 18 Jim Clancy; 28 Mike Darr; 22 Dennis DeBarr; 36 Jerry Garvin; 26 Steve Hargan; 24 Chuck Hartenstein; 34 Jesse Jefferson; 44 Jerry Johnson; 23 Dave Lemanczyk; 45 Tom Murphy; 48 Bill Singer; 30 Pete Vuckovich; 33 Mike Willis	Catchers: 8 Alan Ashby; 9 Rick Cerone; 4 Phil Roof; 12 Ernie Whitt; Infielders: 25 Doug Ault; 6 Ron Fairly; 38 Pedro García; 13 Roy Howell; 10 Jim Mason; 39 Dave McKay; 16 Tim Nordbrook; 10 Doug Rader; 2 Steve Staggs; 29 Héctor Torres	Outfielders: 1 Bob Bailor; 3 Steve Bowling; 5 Sam Ewing; 11 John Scott; 19 Otto Vélez; 20 Al Woods; 35 Gary Woods	Manager: 7 Roy Hartsfield; Coaches: 31 Bobby Doerr (hitting); 43 Don Leppert (first base); 15 Bob Miller (pitching); 42 Jackie Moore (third base); 41 Harry Warner (bullpen)

=== Game log ===
1977 Game Log 54–107 (Home 25–55, Away 29–52)
April: 10–11 (Home 6–4, Away 4–7)

#	Date	Opponent	Score	Win	Loss	Save	Attendance	Record
1	April 7	White Sox	9–5	Johnson (1–0)	Brett (0–1)	Vuckovic (1)	44,649	1–0
2	April 9	White Sox	2–3	Knapp (1–0)	Lemanczyk (0–1)	LaGrow (1)	18,214	1–1
3	April 10	White Sox	3–1	Garvin (1–0)	Stone (0–1)	Vuckovic (2)	17,059	2–1
4	April 11	Tigers	5–3	Hargan (1–0)	Hiller (0–1)		29,132	3–1
5	April 12	Tigers	1–6	Roberts (1–1)	Singer (0–1)		11,505	3–2
6	April 13	Tigers	7–6	Lemanczyk (1–1)	Arroyo (0–1)	Willis (1)	12,113	4–2
7	April 14	Tigers	5–3	Garvin (2–0)	Hiller (0–2)		13,369	5–2
8	April 15	@ White Sox	5–7	Barrios (1–0)	Johnson (1–1)		10,840	5–3
9	April 16	@ White Sox	2–3	Stone (1–1)	Vuckovic (0–1)		7,467	5–4
10	April 17	@ White Sox	2–4	Brett (2–1)	Singer (0–2)	Del Canton (1)	14,583	5–5
11	April 18	@ Yankees	5–1	Lemanczyk (2–1)	Figueroa (0–2)		9,685	6–5
12	April 19	@ Yankees	8–3	Garvin (3–0)	Patterson (0–1)		9,954	7–5
13	April 20	@ Yankees	5–7	Gullett (1–2)	Hargan (1–1)	Lyle (2)	10,819	7–6
14	April 21	@ Yankees	8–6	Holtzman (1–0)	Hartenstein (0–1)	Lyle (3)	10,502	7–7
–	April 22	Red Sox	Postponed (rain) Rescheduled for April 25					
–	April 23	Red Sox	Postponed (rain) Rescheduled for September 5					
15	April 24	Red Sox	0–9	Jenkins (2–1)	Singer (0–3)		29,303	7–8
16	April 25	Red Sox	4–3	Vuckovich (1–1)	Campbell (0–3)			8–8
17	April 25	Red Sox	5–6	Willoughby (1–0)	Vuckovic (1–2)		15,016	8–9
–	April 26	@ Indians	Postponed (rain) Rescheduled for April 28					
18	April 27	@ Indians	6–5 (12)	Willis (1–0)	Kern (0–1)		3,639	9–9
19	April 28	@ Indians	3–4	Fitzmorris (1–2)	Jefferson (0–1)	Waits (1)	2,724	9–10
20	April 29	@ Royals	1–6	Colborn (4–1)	Singer (0–4)		15,523	9–11
21	April 30	@ Royals	2–1	Garvin (4–0)	Splittorff (1–2)		15,301	10–11

May: 8–17 (Home 5–10, Away 3–7)

#	Date	Opponent	Score	Win	Loss	Save	Attendance	Record
22	May 1	@ Royals	2–8	Gura (2–0)	Lemanczyk (2–2)	Littell (3)	34,066	10–12
23	May 2	Brewers	1–3	Haas (1–1)	Hargan (1–2)	Castro (5)	17,577	10–13
24	May 3	Brewers	2–6	Cort (1–0)	Jefferson (0–2)		13,148	10–14
25	May 4	Brewers	10–3	Singer (1–4)	Slaton (1–2)	Willis (2)	25,699	11–14
26	May 5	Brewers	9–8	Vuckovic (2–2)	Castro (3–1)		12,268	12–14
27	May 6	Twins	2–7	Zahn (5–0)	Lemanczyk (2–3)	Schueler (1)	26,355	12–15
28	May 7	Twins	1–4	Thormodsgard (2–1)	Hargan (1–3)	Johnson (4)	34,091	12–16
29	May 8	Twins	4–5	Goltz (1–2)	Jefferson (0–3)	Johnson (5)	20,902	12–17
30	May 9	Mariners	10–4	Singer (2–4)	Thomas (1–4)		11,680	13–17
31	May 10	Mariners	9–3	Garvin (5–0)	Montague (3–3)		13,017	14–17
32	May 13	@ Twins	3–4 (11)	Schueler (2–1)	Willis (1–1)		9,667	14–18
33	May 14	@ Twins	3–13	Goltz (2–2)	Singer (2–5)		10,503	14–19
34	May 15	@ Twins	3–5	Burgmeier (4–1)	Garvin (5–1)	Schueler (2)	11,401	14–20
35	May 17	@ Brewers	3–1	Jefferson (1–3)	Haas (3–2)	Johnson (1)	6,810	15–20
36	May 18	@ Brewers	2–3 (10)	Castro (4–1)	Vuckovic (2–3)		7,208	15–21
37	May 19	@ Brewers	3–5	Slaton (2–4)	Singer (2–6)	McClure (3)	8,469	15–22
38	May 20	@ Rangers	4–3	Garvin (6–1)	Blyleven (4–4)		21,965	16–22
39	May 21	@ Rangers	9–6	Jefferson (2–3)	Briles (2–1)	Willis (3)	20,351	17–22
40	May 22	@ Rangers	4–7	Alexander (6–1)	Lemanczyk (2–4)	Knowles (2)	21,831	17–23
41	May 23	Athletics	0–3	Langford (4–3)	Vuckovic (2–4)		27,705	17–24
42	May 25	Athletics	5–6 (10)	Giusti (1–2)	Garvin (6–2)		36,097	17–25
43	May 27	Angels	1–4	Ross (2–2)	Johnson (1–2)	Hartzell (4)	24,779	17–26
44	May 28	Angels	6–4	Jefferson (3–3)	Simpson (3–4)	Vuckovic (3)	30,034	18–26
45	May 29	Angels	2–3	Ryan (8–4)	Lemanczyk (2–5)		30,009	18–27
46	May 30	Royals	1–4	Splittorff (4–4)	Garvin (6–3)	Littell (6)	20,002	18–28

June: 10–17 (Home 3–9, Away 7–8)

#	Date	Opponent	Score	Win	Loss	Save	Attendance	Record
47	June 1	Royals	3–11	Leonard (3–5)	Singer (2–7)		33,004	18–29
48	June 3	@ Athletics	2–3	Lacey (2–2)	Jefferson (3–4)		3,030	18–30
49	June 4	@ Athletics	4–2	Lemanczyk (3–5)	Ellis (2–5)	Vuckovic (4)	4,525	19–30
50	June 5	@ Athletics	7–3	Garvin (7–3)	Blue (3–7)	Johnson (2)	4,580	20–30
51	June 7	@ Angels	6–3	Willis (2–1)	Hartzell (1–5)		10,239	21–30
52	June 8	@ Angels	1–2 (13)	LaRoche (4–2)	Bruno (0–1)		11,678	21–31
53	June 10	@ Mariners	4–3	Lemanczyk (4–5)	Montague (5–4)	Willis (4)	11,786	22–31
54	June 11	@ Mariners	5–4	Johnson (2–2)	Romo (3–4)		21,318	23–31
55	June 12	@ Mariners	2–5	Pole (3–2)	Vuckovic (2–5)		28,412	23–32
56	June 14	@ Tigers	2–7	Hiller (4–6)	Jefferson (3–5)		11,808	23–33
57	June 15	@ Tigers	0–9	Arroyo (5–3)	Lemanczyk (4–6)		11,349	23–34
58	June 16	@ Tigers	1–4	Fidrych (3–2)	Garvin (7–4)		26,041	23–35
59	June 17	Orioles	3–5	Martínez (6–4)	Vuckovic (2–6)		26,183	23–36
60	June 18	Orioles	2–4	Palmer (8–6)	Jefferson (3–6)	Martinez (2)	33,201	23–37
61	June 19	Orioles	7–1	Lemanczyk (5–6)	Flanagan (2–7)		34,556	24–37
62	June 20	Indians	5–8 (11)	Dobson (2–6)	Willis (2–2)	Kern (8)	24,568	24–38
63	June 21	Indians	0–4	Waits (4–0)	Garvin (7–5)	Kern (9)	18,039	24–39
64	June 22	Indians	5–7 (12)	Kern (3–3)	Johnson (2–3)	Monge (4)	29,750	24–40
65	June 23	Indians	0–4	Garland (4–7)	Jefferson (3–7)		16,747	24–41
66	June 24	@ Orioles	5–4	Lemanczyk (6–6)	Holdsworth (0–1)	Willis (5)	8,133	25–41
67	June 25	@ Orioles	2–5	Martínez (7–5)	Byrd (0–1)		16,794	25–42
68	June 25	@ Orioles	1–3	Grimsley (7–3)	Garvin (7–6)		16,794	25–43
69	June 26	@ Orioles	2–0	Vuckovic (3–6)	Palmer (8–8)		16,761	26–43
70	June 27	Yankees	7–6	Jefferson (4–7)	Guidry (5–4)	Johnson (3)	29,138	27–43
71	June 28	Yankees	8–5	Lemanczyk (7–6)	Clay (0–2)		40,116	28–43
72	June 28	Yankees	1–5 (11)	Tidrow (6–2)	Johnson (2–4)		40,116	28–44
73	June 30	Yankees	5–11	Hunter (4–3)	Garvin (7–7)		33,283	28–45

July: 7–21 (Home 5–10, Away 2–11)

#	Date	Opponent	Score	Win	Loss	Save	Attendance	Record
74	July 1	Rangers	8–11	Alexander (7–5)	Byrd (0–2)	Devine (4)	21,089	28–46
75	July 2	Rangers	10–7	Vuckovic (4–6)	Barker (0–1)		19,176	29–46
76	July 3	Rangers	3–6 (10)	Ellis (4–7)	Willis (2–3)	Knowles (3)		29–47
77	July 3	Rangers	5–3	Jefferson (5–7)	Knowles (2–1)		32,066	30–47
78	July 4	@ Red Sox	6–9	Campbell (6–5)	Hartenstein (0–2)		21,073	30–48
79	July 6	@ Red Sox	5–9	Campbell (7–5)	Vuckovic (4–7)		34,956	30–49
80	July 7	@ Red Sox	2–5	Stanley (5–3)	Jefferson (5–8)	Campbell (16)	32,641	30–50
81	July 8	@ Indians	5–11	Eckersley (8–7)	Lemanczyk (7–7)		12,719	30–51
82	July 9	@ Indians	2–3	Garland (6–9)	Garvin (7–8)		19,594	30–52
83	July 10	@ Indians	5–3	Byrd (1–2)	Dobson (3–8)	Vuckovic (5)	12,935	31–52
84	July 11	@ Tigers	7–9	Grilli (1–0)	DeBarr (0–1)		9,057	31–53
85	July 12	@ Tigers	1–2	Crawford (3–2)	Jefferson (5–9)		25,007	31–54
86	July 13	@ White Sox	3–6	Knapp (8–4)	Singer (2–8)	Johnson (2)		31–55
87	July 13	@ White Sox	5–3 (11)	Lemanczyk (8–7)	Kucek (0–1)		25,669	32–55
88	July 14	@ White Sox	1–2	Kravec (6–2)	Garvin (7–9)		15,937	32–56
89	July 15	Tigers	8–6 (13)	Vuckovic (5–7)	Crawford (3–3)		23,749	33–56
90	July 16	Tigers	3–11	Rozema (8–4)	Willis (2–4)		35,151	33–57
91	July 17	Tigers	3–2	Jefferson (6–9)	Arroyo (5–9)			34–57
92	July 17	Tigers	6–7 (11)	Hiller (5–9)	Lemanczyk (8–8)		36,613	34–58
93	July 22	White Sox	3–10	Wood (5–2)	Garvin (7–10)	LaGrow (17)	33,175	34–59
94	July 23	White Sox	3–10	Kravec (7–2)	Lemanczyk (8–9)		24,263	34–60
95	July 24	@ Tigers	2–6	Sykes (2–3)	Jefferson (6–10)		20,177	34–61
96	July 25	@ Tigers	3–8	Wilcox (2–0)	Byrd (1–3)	Crawford (1)	16,911	34–62
97	July 26	Rangers	0–14	Blyleven (10–9)	Clancy (0–1)		22,357	34–63
98	July 28	Rangers	0–3	Perry (9–8)	Garvin (7–11)		17,512	34–64
99	July 29	Brewers	3–7	Haas (7–7)	Jefferson (6–11)		14,303	34–65
100	July 30	Brewers	2–3	Slaton (8–9)	Byrd (1–4)		18,639	34–66
101	July 31	Brewers	4–1	Lemanczyk (9–9)	Augustine (10–12)	Murphy (1)	28,110	35–66

August: 10–18 (Home 3–8, Away 7–10)

#	Date	Opponent	Score	Win	Loss	Save	Attendance	Record
102	August 1	Brewers	3–2	Clancy (1–1)	Sorensen (2–5)		17,590	36–66
103	August 3	@ Royals	4–7	Splittorff (9–5)	Garvin (7–12)	Bird (1)	16,775	36–67
104	August 4	@ Royals	0–8	Gura (6–5)	Jefferson (6–12)		17,661	36–68
105	August 5	@ Brewers	6–1	Byrd (2–4)	Slaton (8–10)		13,609	37–68
106	August 6	@ Brewers	5–3	Lemanczyk (10–9)	Augustine (10–13)	Johnson (4)	12,720	38–68
107	August 7	@ Brewers	2–6	Sorensen (3–5)	Garvin (7–13)	McClure (4)		38–69
108	August 7	@ Brewers	5–7	Haas (8–7)	Clancy (1–2)	Hinds (2)	12,070	38–70
109	August 9	Twins	6–2	Jefferson (7–12)	Thormodsgard (9–9)		23,450	39–70
110	August 11	Twins	3–7	Goltz (15–6)	Byrd (2–5)	Johnson (14)	18,430	39–71
111	August 12	Royals	8–9	Pattin (5–2)	Lemanczyk (10–10)	Bird (3)	19,143	39–72
112	August 13	Royals	3–5	Splittorff (10–6)	Clancy (1–3)	Bird (4)	25,027	39–73
113	August 14	Royals	6–3	Murphy (1–1)	Leonard (12–10)	Vuckovic (6)	27,430	40–73
114	August 15	Angels	4–7	Tanana (14–7)	Jefferson (7–13)		18,453	40–74
115	August 16	Angels	2–7	Hartzell (6–7)	Byrd (2–6)		15,424	40–75
116	August 17	@ Rangers	5–6 (10)	Devine (9–6)	Willis (2–5)		12,913	40–76
117	August 18	@ Rangers	0–8	Ellis (7–9)	Clancy (1–4)		15,740	40–77
118	August 19	@ Angels	3–1	Garvin (8–13)	Ryan (17–11)	Vuckovic (7)	16,570	41–77
119	August 20	@ Angels	5–4	Vuckovic (6–7)	LaRoche (7–5)		15,311	42–77
120	August 21	@ Angels	2–3	Tanana (15–7)	Byrd (2–7)		12,421	42–78
121	August 22	@ Athletics	2–5	Medich (6–6)	Lemanczyk (10–11)	Lacey (7)	4,429	42–79
122	August 23	@ Athletics	8–1	Clancy (2–4)	Umbarger (1–5)		3,797	43–79
123	August 24	@ Mariners	7–0	Garvin (9–13)	Pole (7–11)			44–79
124	August 24	@ Mariners	9–3	Jefferson (8–13)	Abbott (10–9)		13,253	45–79
125	August 26	Athletics	4–8	Torrealba (4–4)	Byrd (2–8)		22,536	45–80
126	August 27	Athletics	8–9	Medich (7–6)	Lemanczyk (10–12)	Bair (2)	23,651	45–81
127	August 28	Athletics	2–6	Blue (13–15)	Clancy (2–5)		24,087	45–82
128	August 29	@ Twins	6–7 (10)	Schueler (7–6)	Murphy (1–2)			45–83
129	August 29	@ Twins	5–6	Johnson (15–6)	Willis (2–6)		10,364	45–84

September: 8–22 (Home 2–13, Away 6–9)

#	Date	Opponent	Score	Win	Loss	Save	Attendance	Record
130	September 2	Mariners	3–4	Abbott (11–10)	Lemanczyk (10–13)		13,502	45–85
131	September 3	Mariners	2–6	Montague (7–10)	Jefferson (8–14)	Romo (12)	15,109	45–86
132	September 4	Mariners	2–7	Mitchell (2–5)	Garvin (9–14)		17,084	45–87
133	September 5	Red Sox	0–8	Aase (4–1)	Byrd (2–9)			45–88
134	September 5	Red Sox	0–6	Cleveland (9–7)	Clancy (2–6)		30,373	45–89
135	September 6	Red Sox	2–11	Lee (7–3)	Darr (0–1)		17,666	45–90
136	September 7	Red Sox	3–2	Lemanczyk (11–13)	Jenkins (10–10)		31,684	46–90
137	September 8	Red Sox	2–7	Paxton (9–4)	Jefferson (8–15)		19,163	46–91
138	September 9	@ Yankees	0–2	Torrez (16–12)	Garvin (9–15)		21,145	46–92
139	September 10	@ Yankees	19–3	Clancy (3–6)	Hunter (9–9)		20,296	47–92
140	September 11	@ Yankees	3–4	Tidrow (10–4)	Byrd (2–10)	Lyle (23)	40,905	47–93
141	September 11	@ Yankees	6–4	Murphy (2–2)	Gullett (11–4)	Johnson (5)	40,905	48–93
142	September 12	Orioles	3–6	Palmer (16–11)	Lemanczyk (11–14)	Martinez (8)	13,498	48–94
143	September 14	Orioles	5–6	Flanagan (12–10)	Jefferson (8–16)	McGregor (3)	19,048	48–95
144	September 14	Orioles	2–4	May (17–12)	Garvin (9–16)	McGregor (4)	19,048	48–96
145	September 15	Orioles	4–0 (5) †	Clancy (4–6)	Grimsley (13–9)		14,015	49–96
–	September 16	@ Indians	Postponed (rain) Rescheduled for September 17					
146	September 17	@ Indians	3–6	Eckersley (14–12)	Byrd (2–11)	Dobson (1)		49–97
147	September 17	@ Indians	5–6	Lemanczyk (12–14)	Waits (8–6)	Murphy (2)	5,593	50–97
148	September 18	@ Indians	7–4	Jefferson (9–16)	Garland (11–19)	Vuckovic (8)	4,376	51–97
149	September 19	@ Orioles	3–1	Garvin (10–16)	May (17–13)		3,325	52–97
150	September 20	@ Orioles	2–5	Palmer (18–11)	Clancy (4–7)		4,301	52–98
151	September 21	@ Orioles	0–4	Grimsley (14–9)	Byrd (2–12)		4,237	52–99
152	September 22	@ Orioles	1–7	Flanagan (13–10)	Lemanczyk (12–15)		9,261	52–100
153	September 23	Yankees	3–5	Gullett (13–4)	Jefferson (9–17)		32,590	52–101
–	September 24	Yankees	Postponed (rain) Rescheduled for September 25					
154	September 25	Yankees	0–15	Guidry (16–6)	Garvin (10–17)		35,117	52–102
155	September 25	Yankees	0–2	Figueroa (16–10)	Clancy (4–8)	Lyle (25)	35,117	52–103
–	September 26	@ Red Sox	Postponed (rain) Rescheduled for September 27					
156	September 27	@ Red Sox	5–6	Aase (6–2)	Byrd (2–13)	Campbell (30)		52–104
157	September 27	@ Red Sox	1–5	Tiant (12–8)	Lemanczyk (12–16)	Campbell (31)	23,952	52–105
158	September 28	@ Red Sox	3–2	Vuckovic (7–7)	Lee (9–5)		20,362	53–105
159	September 29	@ Red Sox	3–7	Stanley (8–7)	Garvin (10–18)		12,240	53–106
–	September 30	Indians	Postponed (rain) Rescheduled for October 1					

October: 1–1 (Home 1–1, Away 0–0)

#	Date	Opponent	Score	Win	Loss	Save	Attendance	Record
–	October 1	Indians	Postponed (rain) Rescheduled for October 2					
–	October 1	Indians	Postponed (rain) Not rescheduled					
160	October 2	Indians	2–1 (11)	Lemanczyk (13–16)	Andersen (0–1)			54–106
161	October 2	Indians	4–5	Camper (1–0)	Clancy (4–9)	Waits (2)	27,789	54–107

† Game forfeited by Baltimore.

== Player stats ==
= Indicates team leader

=== Batting ===
==== Starters by position ====
Note: Pos = Position; G = Games played; AB = At bats; R = Runs scored; H = Hits; 2B = Doubles; 3B = Triples; Avg = Batting average; HR = Home runs; RBI = Runs batted in; SB = Stolen bases

Pos	Player	G	AB	R	H	2B	3B	Avg	HR	RBI	SB
C	Alan Ashby	124	396	25	83	16	3	.210	2	29	0
1B	Doug Ault	129	445	44	109	22	3	.245	11	64	4
2B	Steve Staggs	72	290	37	75	11	6	.259	2	28	5
3B	Roy Howell	96	364	41	115	17	1	.316	10	44	4
SS	Héctor Torres	91	266	33	64	7	3	.241	5	26	1
LF	Al Woods	122	440	58	125	17	4	.284	6	35	8
CF	Gary Woods	60	227	21	49	9	1	.216	0	17	5
RF	Otto Vélez	120	360	50	92	19	3	.256	16	62	4
DH	Ron Fairly	132	458	60	128	24	2	.279	19	64	0

==== Other batters ====
Note: G = Games played; AB = At bats; R = Runs scored; H = Hits; 2B = Doubles; 3B = Triples; Avg = Batting average; HR = Home runs; RBI = Runs batted in; SB = Stolen bases

Player	G	AB	R	H	2B	3B	Avg	HR	RBI	SB
Bob Bailor	122	496	62	154	21	5	.310	5	32	15
Doug Rader	96	313	47	75	18	2	.240	13	40	2
Dave McKay	95	274	18	54	4	3	.197	3	22	2
Sam Ewing	97	244	24	70	8	2	.287	4	34	1
John Scott	79	233	26	56	9	0	.240	2	15	10
Steve Bowling	89	194	19	40	8	1	.206	1	13	2
Pedro Garcia	41	130	10	27	10	1	.208	0	9	0
Rick Cerone	31	100	7	20	4	0	.200	1	10	0
Jim Mason	22	79	10	13	3	0	.165	0	2	1
Tim Nordbrook	24	63	9	11	0	1	.175	0	1	1
Ernie Whitt	23	41	4	7	3	0	.171	0	6	0
Phil Roof	3	5	0	0	0	0	.000	0	0	0

=== Pitching ===
==== Starting pitchers ====
Note: G = Games pitched; GS = Games started; IP = Innings pitched; W = Wins; L = Losses; ERA = Earned run average; R = Runs allowed; ER = Earned runs allowed; BB = Walks allowed; K = Strikeouts

Player	G	GS	IP	W	L	ERA	R	ER	BB	K
Dave Lemanczyk	34	34	252.0	13	16	4.25	143	119	87	105
Jerry Garvin	34	34	244.2	10	18	4.19	127	114	85	127
Jesse Jefferson	33	33	217.0	9	17	4.31	123	104	83	114
Jeff Byrd	17	17	87.1	2	13	6.18	68	60	68	40
Jim Clancy	13	13	76.2	4	9	5.05	47	43	47	44
Bill Singer	13	12	59.2	2	8	6.79	54	45	39	33
Steve Hargan	6	5	29.1	1	3	5.22	17	17	14	11
Mike Darr	1	1	1.1	0	1	33.75	5	5	4	1

==== Relief pitchers ====
Note: G = Games pitched; IP = Innings pitched; W = Wins; L = Losses; SV = Saves; ERA = Earned run average; R = Runs allowed; ER = Earned runs allowed; BB = Walks allowed; K = Strikeouts

Player	G	IP	W	L	SV	ERA	R	ER	BB	K
Pete Vuckovich	53	148.0	7	7	8	3.47	64	57	59	123
Mike Willis	43	107.1	2	6	5	3.94	48	47	38	59
Jerry Johnson	43	86.0	2	4	5	4.60	50	44	54	54
Tom Murphy	19	52.0	2	1	2	3.63	22	21	18	26
Dennis DeBarr	14	21.1	0	1	0	5.91	14	14	8	10
Tom Bruno	12	18.1	0	1	0	7.85	18	16	13	9
Chuck Hartenstein	13	27.1	0	2	0	6.59	22	20	6	15

== Awards and honours ==
- Otto Vélez, OF-DH, Player of the Month Award, April

All-Star Game

- Ron Fairly, first base, reserve

=== Franchise firsts ===
- April 7, 1977:
  - Game & Win: Toronto 9, Chicago (White Sox) 5 (at Exhibition Stadium)
  - Batter: John Scott
  - Pitcher: Bill Singer
  - Hit: Doug Ault
  - Home Run: Doug Ault
  - Stolen Base: Gary Woods
  - Save: Pete Vuckovich
- Grand Slam: June 27, 1977, Héctor Torres vs. New York (AL)
- Walk-off Win: July 15, 1977, Toronto 8, Detroit 6 (13 innings)

== Farm system ==
Level	Team	League	Manager
A-Short Season	Utica Blue Jays	New York–Penn League	Duane Larson
