= 1976 Major League Baseball expansion draft =

Selection of players by the Mariners and Blue Jays

General information
- Sport: Baseball
- Date: November 5, 1976

Overview
- 60 total selections
- League: American League (Note: This draft was limited to American League teams; while the American League and National League are commonly referred to collectively as Major League Baseball, across many decades, Major League Baseball has only existed as a legal entity since 2000.)
- Expansion teams: Seattle Mariners; Toronto Blue Jays
- Expansion season: 1977
- First selection: Ruppert Jones (Seattle Mariners)

The 1976 Major League Baseball Expansion draft was held November 5, 1976. This expansion draft was conducted by Major League Baseball to stock the major league rosters of the Toronto Blue Jays and the Seattle Mariners, new American League franchises established via the 1977 Major League Baseball expansion that were set to start play in the 1977 season.

== Background ==
1977 American League expansion teams

Seattle was promised a franchise by Commissioner Bowie Kuhn. During the summer of 1975, there was speculation that the Minnesota Twins, Chicago White Sox, or San Francisco Giants could move to Seattle. When none of these plans proved successful, the American League added a team in Seattle. With 13 teams in a league creating scheduling problems, the league awarded a franchise to Toronto over Washington, D.C. in March 1976.

Both Seattle and Toronto had purchased or otherwise acquired a handful of players shortly before the draft, but nowhere near enough to fill a roster (or even assemble a nine-man squad). Drafted players were selected only from American League teams, in keeping with the practices of the American League expansion of 1961, the National League expansion of 1962, and the expansion of both leagues in 1969. Beginning with the next expansion, in 1993, the new teams would select players from teams in both leagues.

Danny Kaye, part-owner of the Mariners, announced the club's first selection.

== Draft results ==
Key
‡	All-Star

Round	Pick	Player	Position	Selected from	Selected by
1	1	Ruppert Jones^{‡}	OF	Kansas City Royals	Seattle Mariners
1	2	Bob Bailor	OF	Baltimore Orioles	Toronto Blue Jays
1	3	Gary Wheelock	P	California Angels	Seattle Mariners
1	4	Jerry Garvin	P	Minnesota Twins	Toronto Blue Jays
1	5	Bill Stein	3B	Chicago White Sox	Seattle Mariners
1	6	Jim Clancy^{‡}	P	Texas Rangers	Toronto Blue Jays
1	7	Dick Pole	P	Boston Red Sox	Seattle Mariners
1	8	Gary Woods	OF	Oakland Athletics	Toronto Blue Jays
1	9	Dan Meyer	1B	Detroit Tigers	Seattle Mariners
1	10	Rico Carty^{‡}	DH	Cleveland Indians	Toronto Blue Jays (Note: Shortly after the draft, Carty was traded by Toronto to the Cleveland Indians for Rick Cerone and John Lowenstein. Toronto later reacquired Carty, who played for them in 1978 and 1979.)
1	11	Grant Jackson^{‡}	P	New York Yankees	Seattle Mariners (Note: Shortly after the draft, Jackson was traded by Seattle to the Pittsburgh Pirates for Craig Reynolds and Jimmy Sexton.)
1	12	Butch Edge	P	Milwaukee Brewers	Toronto Blue Jays (Note: Edge did not make a major-league league squad until 1979.)
2	13	Al Fitzmorris	P	Kansas City Royals	Toronto Blue Jays (Note: Fitzmorris was immediately traded on the day of the draft by Toronto to the Cleveland Indians in exchange for Alan Ashby and Doug Howard.)
2	14	Dave Collins	OF	California Angels	Seattle Mariners
2	15	Alvis Woods	OF	Minnesota Twins	Toronto Blue Jays
2	16	Frank MacCormack	P	Detroit Tigers	Seattle Mariners
2	17	Mike Darr	P	Baltimore Orioles	Toronto Blue Jays
2	18	Stan Thomas	P	Cleveland Indians	Seattle Mariners
2	19	Pete Vuckovich	P	Chicago White Sox	Toronto Blue Jays
2	20	Juan Bernhardt	OF	New York Yankees	Seattle Mariners
2	21	Jeff Byrd	P	Texas Rangers	Toronto Blue Jays
2	22	Rick Jones	P	Boston Red Sox	Seattle Mariners
2	23	Steve Bowling	OF	Milwaukee Brewers	Toronto Blue Jays
2	24	Glenn Abbott	P	Oakland Athletics	Seattle Mariners
3	25	Bob Stinson	C	Kansas City Royals	Seattle Mariners
3	26	Dennis DeBarr	P	Detroit Tigers	Toronto Blue Jays
3	27	Carlos López	OF	California Angels	Seattle Mariners
3	28	Bill Singer	P	Minnesota Twins	Toronto Blue Jays
3	29	Dave Pagan	P	Baltimore Orioles	Seattle Mariners
3	30	Jim Mason	SS	New York Yankees	Toronto Blue Jays
3	31	Roy Thomas	P	Chicago White Sox	Seattle Mariners (Note: Thomas was traded by Seattle before the start of the season to the Houston Astros for infielder Larry Milbourne. Seattle later reacquired Thomas, who played for them between 1983 and 1987.)
3	32	Doug Ault	1B	Texas Rangers	Toronto Blue Jays
3	33	Tom McMillan	SS	Cleveland Indians	Seattle Mariners
3	34	Ernie Whitt^{‡}	C	Boston Red Sox	Toronto Blue Jays
3	35	Pete Broberg	P	Milwaukee Brewers	Seattle Mariners (Note: Broberg was traded in April (without appearing in a game for Seattle) to the Chicago Cubs for a player to be named later. The Cubs later sent Jim Todd to the Mariners to complete the trade.)
3	36	Mike Weathers	IF	Oakland Athletics	Toronto Blue Jays (Note: Just prior to spring training, Weathers was traded by Toronto back to Oakland for Ron Fairly.)
4	37	Steve Staggs	2B	Kansas City Royals	Toronto Blue Jays
4	38	Steve Braun	OF	Minnesota Twins	Seattle Mariners
4	39	Steve Hargan^{‡}	P	Texas Rangers	Toronto Blue Jays
4	40	Leroy Stanton	OF	California Angels	Seattle Mariners
4	41	Garth Iorg	3B	New York Yankees	Toronto Blue Jays (Note: Iorg did not make a major-league league squad until 1978.)
4	42	Bob Galasso	P	Baltimore Orioles	Seattle Mariners
4	43	Dave Lemanczyk^{‡}	P	Detroit Tigers	Toronto Blue Jays
4	44	Steve Burke	P	Boston Red Sox	Seattle Mariners
4	45	Larry Anderson	P	Milwaukee Brewers	Toronto Blue Jays (Note: Shortly after the draft, Anderson was sent by Toronto to the Chicago White Sox to complete an earlier deal made to obtain Phil Roof.)
4	46	Joe Lis	1B	Cleveland Indians	Seattle Mariners
4	47	Jesse Jefferson	P	Chicago White Sox	Toronto Blue Jays
4	48	Alan Griffin	P	Oakland Athletics	Seattle Mariners (Note: Griffin did not make Seattle's major-league squad. He played in the minors through 1978.)
5	49	Dave McKay	IF	Minnesota Twins	Toronto Blue Jays
5	50	Bill Laxton	P	Detroit Tigers	Seattle Mariners
5	51	Tom Bruno	P	Kansas City Royals	Toronto Blue Jays
5	52	Julio Cruz	2B	California Angels	Seattle Mariners
5	53	Otto Velez	OF	New York Yankees	Toronto Blue Jays
5	54	Steve Barr	P	Texas Rangers	Seattle Mariners (Note: Barr did not make Seattle's major-league squad. He played in minors through 1978.)
5	55	Mike Willis	P	Baltimore Orioles	Toronto Blue Jays
5	56	Puchy Delgado	OF	Boston Red Sox	Seattle Mariners
5	57	Sam Ewing	OF	Chicago White Sox	Toronto Blue Jays
5	58	Tommy Smith	OF	Cleveland Indians	Seattle Mariners
5	59	Leon Hooten	P	Oakland Athletics	Toronto Blue Jays (Note: Hooten was released by Toronto prior to the start of the 1977 season.)
5	60	Greg Erardi	P	Milwaukee Brewers	Seattle Mariners
