= John Scott (1970s outfielder) =

American baseball player (born 1952)

- Outfielder
- Born: January 24, 1952 (age 74); Jackson, Mississippi, U.S.
- Batted: Right Threw: Right

Professional debut
- MLB: September 7, 1974, for the San Diego Padres
- NPB: April 7, 1979, for the Yakult Swallows

Last appearance
- MLB: September 27, 1977, for the Toronto Blue Jays
- NPB: August 27, 1981, for the Yakult Swallows

MLB statistics
- Batting average: .222
- Home runs: 2
- Runs batted in: 15

NPB statistics
- Batting average: .262
- Home runs: 48
- Runs batted in: 159
- Stats at Baseball Reference

Teams
- San Diego Padres (1974–1975); Toronto Blue Jays (1977); Yakult Swallows (1979–1981)

John Henry Scott (born January 24, 1952) is an American former Major League Baseball outfielder who played in parts of three seasons. He played with the San Diego Padres from 1974 to 1975 and the Toronto Blue Jays in 1977, appearing in 118 career games.

== Playing career ==
=== San Diego Padres (1974-1975) ===
Scott was selected by the San Diego Padres with the second overall pick in the 1970 MLB draft. He made his Major League debut with the Padres on September 7, 1974, going 0 for 1 in a game against the Houston Astros.

On September 25, Scott collected his first career hit, a single off Mike Caldwell, then of the San Francisco Giants. Scott finished the 1974 season with a .067 batting average having appeared in only 14 games.

He opened the 1975 season with the Padres, but was used almost exclusively as a pinch-runner or pinch-hitter. In a pinch-running assignment on April 15, he stole second and third, and scored the tying run in an eventual 2-1 win for the Padres. These were the only two ML stolen bases of the year for Scott. Scott appeared in 25 games with the 1975 Padres, going hitless through nine at-bats, and only appeared in one game as a fielder, playing three innings in center field on April 22 with no chances. He was sent down to Class-AA Alexandria by the end of June, and was not called up in September.

In 1976, he played the entire season with the Hawaii Islanders of the Triple-A Pacific Coast League. He hit .315, with 15 home runs and 38 stolen bases, but was not recalled to San Diego.

On October 22, 1976, the newly-created Toronto Blue Jays purchased Scott's contract from the Padres.

=== Toronto Blue Jays (1977) ===
Scott was the Toronto Blue Jays opening day left fielder in their first ever game on April 7, 1977, and was the first batter in team history, leading off the bottom of the first inning, as Chicago White Sox starting pitcher Ken Brett struck him out. He finished the game going 1 for 5 with a double.

Used infrequently during the opening weeks of the season, often as a defensive replacement or pinch runner, Scott compiled only 27 plate appearances in the team's first 37 games. However, on May 20, he became the Blue Jays regular starting center fielder, a position he held through mid-July.

On June 5, Scott hit his first career home run off Vida Blue of the Oakland Athletics. He hit his second, and last, two days later off the California Angels' Paul Hartzell. This capped a 10-game hit streak for Scott, the longest of his career.

Over the next month (June 8 to July 11), Scott cooled off, hitting just .186 over a 27-game stretch. After July 11, Bob Bailor (previously the team's regular shortstop) took over in center field, and for the rest of the season Scott was an occasional player, pinch-hitting, pinch-running, and getting the occasional start in left field spelling Alvis Woods.

Scott ended the season appearing in 79 games with the club, batting .240 with 2 HR and 15 RBI, while finishing second on the Blue Jays with 10 stolen bases.

On December 16, the Blue Jays traded Scott to the St. Louis Cardinals to complete an earlier deal in which they traded Pete Vuckovich to St. Louis for Victor Cruz and Tom Underwood.

=== Post-major league career ===
Scott would not appear in another Major League Baseball game as he spent the entire 1978 season with the Cardinals AAA affiliate, the Springfield Redbirds of the American Association, compiling a 12 HR / 57 RBI / .281 season.

On October 23, 1978, the Cardinals traded Scott to the Chicago White Sox for Jim Willoughby, however, Scott would go on to play with the Yakult Swallows of Nippon Professional Baseball from 1979 to 1981. He hit .262 with 48 HR, 159 RBI, and 43 stolen bases over his three seasons with the Swallows.

He ended his MLB career having played in 118 games, recording 57 hits, batting .222, with 2 HR and 15 RBI, while stealing 13 bases.
