= Bob Galasso =

American baseball player (born 1952)

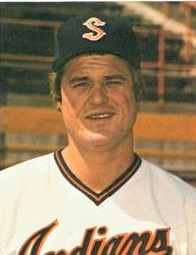
- Galasso with the Spokane Indians in 1978
- Pitcher
- Born: January 13, 1952 (age 74); Connellsville, Pennsylvania, U.S.
- Batted: Left Threw: Right

MLB debut
- July 24, 1977, for the Seattle Mariners

Last MLB appearance
- September 5, 1981, for the Seattle Mariners

MLB statistics
- Win–loss record: 4–8
- Earned run average: 5.87
- Strikeouts: 63
- Stats at Baseball Reference

Teams
- Seattle Mariners (1977); Milwaukee Brewers (1979); Seattle Mariners (1981)

Robert Joseph Galasso (born January 13, 1952) is an American former professional baseball pitcher. He pitched in three seasons in the Major League Baseball (MLB) between 1977 and 1981 for the Seattle Mariners and Milwaukee Brewers. A highlight of Galasso's MLB career was picking up a win in relief during a marathon 20-inning game against the Boston Red Sox on September 3, 1981. He pitched three scoreless innings (17th, 18th and 19th) to earn the victory for the Mariners.

Galasso made 55 appearances in the major leagues (eight starts).

Galasso attended Connellsville Area High School in Connellsville, Pennsylvania, then Robert Morris University in Moon Township, Pennsylvania. He signed out of high school with the Baltimore Orioles as an amateur free agent in August 1969. The Mariners selected him in the 1976 expansion draft. He was teammates in high school and in the minor leagues with Bob Bailor, who was chosen by the Toronto Blue Jays in the expansion draft. After 11 games with the new franchise in 1977, going 0–6, the Mariners released Galasso in March 1978. He signed with the Brewers and returned to the majors for 31 games as a reliever in 1979. Milwaukee released him in March 1981, and he returned to Seattle, pitching in 13 games in his final major league season. He last pitched in the minors in 1984.

Galasso later pitched for Nettuno in the Italian Baseball League, winning league championships in 1990 and 1993.

Galasso's father pitched in the Pittsburgh Pirates minor league system.
