= Steve Bowling =

American baseball player

- Outfielder
- Born: June 26, 1952 (age 74); Tulsa, Oklahoma, U.S.
- Batted: Right Threw: Right

MLB debut
- September 7, 1976, for the Milwaukee Brewers

Last MLB appearance
- October 2, 1977, for the Toronto Blue Jays

MLB statistics
- Batting average: .199
- Home runs: 1
- Runs batted in: 15
- Stats at Baseball Reference

Teams
- Milwaukee Brewers (1976); Toronto Blue Jays (1977)

Stephen Shaddon Bowling (born June 26, 1952) is an American former Major League Baseball player. Bowling played for the Milwaukee Brewers in 1976 and the Toronto Blue Jays in 1977. He batted and threw right-handed. Bowling played football and baseball at Webster High School in Tulsa and then at the University of Tulsa, where he was selected to the all-tournament team of the 1971 College World Series.

== Playing career ==
=== Milwaukee Brewers (1976) ===
Bowling was drafted by the Milwaukee Brewers in the seventh round of the 1974 MLB draft, and made his debut with the club on September 7, 1976, as he went 3 for 3 with a double, and RBI and a run scored in the Brewers 17-4 victory over the Cleveland Indians. He recorded his first career hit off pitcher Don Hood. Bowling finished the season with a .167 batting average with 0 HR and 2 RBI in 14 games. On November 5, Bowling was selected by the Toronto Blue Jays in the 1976 MLB expansion draft.

=== Toronto Blue Jays (1977) ===
Bowling was the Toronto Blue Jays opening day right fielder in their first ever game on April 7, as he went 0 for 2 in the Jays 9-5 victory over the Chicago White Sox. He was the team's regular right fielder through April, but ended the month batting .136 and was sent down to Double-A Toledo shortly thereafter. Recalled after only a few weeks, he spent June and early July playing all three outfield positions as a spot starter or defensive replacement. A .121 batting average got him sent down to the minors again in mid-July, only to return to the Jays at the start of August. Initially used mostly as a pinch runner and defensive replacement for his first three weeks back, he became the club's regular center fielder after an injury to Bob Bailor. On August 26, Bowling hit his first (and only) career home run off Rick Langford of the Oakland Athletics.

In September, Gary Woods took over in center, and Bowling moved to right. He ended the season as he started it, as the Jays' everyday right fielder. Bowling performed moderately better as a batter in August and September (hitting .250 over that stretch), and was an outstanding defensive outfielder, finishing second in the American League in assists for 1977 (behind only Carl Yastremski, who appeared in nearly twice as many games as Bowling). Bowling was named the club’s Player of the Month in September. Overall, Bowling appeared in 89 games with Toronto, batting .206 with 1 HR and 13 RBI.

=== Return to minor leagues and retirement (1978-79) ===
Bowling would not play in Major League Baseball after the 1977 season. Sent down to the minors toward the end of spring training in March 1978, Bowling announced that he was considering not reporting and leaving baseball entirely. He eventually did report to the Syracuse Chiefs of the International League, but played exactly one game for the team (at third base, for the only time in his pro career) before being sold to the Cubs, and reporting to the Iowa Oaks of the American Association.

He injured his throwing arm during his time in Iowa, got demoted to double-A, hit just .239 for the season, and was let go at the end of 1978. In 1979, he signed with the Cincinnati Reds organization, but played only three games for the Indianapolis Indians of the American Association before retiring. “I felt stronger and I could hit well, but I really couldn’t throw,” explained Bowling. “The shoulder would dislocate every time I tried to throw."

=== Major League Career (1976–77) ===
Bowling appeared in 103 games in his career, batting .199 with 1 HR and 15 RBI. He collected 47 career hits.
