= Jeff Byrd =

American baseball player (born 1956)

- Pitcher
- Born: November 11, 1956 (age 69); La Mesa, California, U.S.
- Batted: Right Threw: Right

MLB debut
- June 20, 1977, for the Toronto Blue Jays

Last MLB appearance
- September 27, 1977, for the Toronto Blue Jays

MLB statistics
- Win–loss record: 2–13
- Earned run average: 6.18
- Strikeouts: 40
- Stats at Baseball Reference

Teams
- Toronto Blue Jays (1977)

Jeffrey Alan Byrd (born November 11, 1956) is an American former Major League Baseball (MLB) pitcher in 1977 for the Toronto Blue Jays.

== Career ==
=== Texas Rangers ===
Byrd was drafted out of El Capitan High School in Lakeside, California in the second round of the 1974 MLB draft by the Texas Rangers. He turned pro in 1974, playing with the Rangers Gulf Coast League team, earning a 4–1 record and an ERA of 2.87 in nine starts.

In 1975, Byrd moved up to the Anderson Rangers of the Western Carolinas League, in which he had a 7–11 record in 22 starts for the club. The following season in 1976, the Rangers moved Byrd up to AA baseball, where he joined the San Antonio Brewers of the Texas League, where Byrd once again posted a 7–11 record, however his ERA went up to 5.22, as well as 106 walks in 143 innings pitched.

On November 5, 1976, Byrd was left unprotected in the 1976 MLB Expansion Draft, where the Toronto Blue Jays selected him with the 21st pick in the draft.

=== Toronto Blue Jays ===
The Blue Jays, an expansion team in 1977, did not have a AA team affiliated with their club that season. Instead, they sent Byrd to the Cleveland Indians AA team in the Eastern League, the Jersey City Indians. Byrd had a poor record of 1–4, however, he had a very solid ERA of 3.13 in ten games with the club. The Blue Jays promoted Byrd to Major League Baseball in June of that season.

Byrd made his major league debut on June 20, 1977, when he started a game against the Cleveland Indians at Exhibition Stadium. At 20 years old, Byrd became the youngest Blue Jay pitcher to start a game, a distinction he holds to this day. Byrd pitched five innings, allowing three runs, while striking out four hitters, as Toronto lost to Cleveland 6–5. Byrd earned a no-decision in the contest.

On June 25, Byrd made his second career start, pitching 7.1 innings, allowing four runs, and took the loss as the Baltimore Orioles defeated Toronto 5–2. In his fourth career start, Byrd pitched six innings, allowing three runs, as Toronto won over Cleveland 5–3 at Cleveland Municipal Stadium, and Byrd earned his first career victory.

Byrd would struggle for the rest of the season, picking up only 2 wins in a total of 17 starts. Wildness was a particular issue, as his BB/9 ratio (ratio of base on balls per 9 innings) for the season was 7.0, more than twice the league average of 3.0. His season ended on a particularly dismal note, as he lost each of his final nine starts, and pitched in only 0.2 innings in his final start, allowing five runs to the Boston Red Sox. Byrd finished the year (and, it turned out, his major league career) with a 2–13 record, and an ERA of 6.18.

At the end of spring training 1978, the Blue Jays assigned Byrd to their AAA affiliate, the Syracuse Chiefs of the International League. He complained to the press when he was sent down to Triple-A that his minor league salary was less than what he could make doing construction work. At Syracuse, Byrd had a disastrous time of it, making seven starts and posting a 0–3 record and an ERA of 8.13. When the Blue Jays decided to further demote Byrd to Double-A after his poor start in Syracuse, he abruptly left the Blue Jays organization and—proving his point about his minimal minor league baseball salary—spent the rest of the year working at a construction site.

Byrd rejoined the team for spring training, 1979, declaring that the previous year was "water under the bridge". However, the Blue Jays released Byrd on March 29, 1979.

=== Seattle Mariners ===
In 1979, Byrd spent the season with the San Jose Missions of the California League, which was the Seattle Mariners A level affiliate. Byrd posted a solid record of 12–6 with an ERA of 2.98 in 26 starts. However, wildness continued to be a problem, as in 151 innings, Byrd walked 117 batters, hit 15 others, and threw 17 wild pitches. Byrd ended his career after that season.
