= Mike Darr (pitcher) =

American baseball player (born 1956)

- Pitcher
- Born: March 23, 1956 (age 70); Pomona, California, U.S.
- Batted: Right Threw: Right

MLB debut
- September 6, 1977, for the Toronto Blue Jays

Last MLB appearance
- September 6, 1977, for the Toronto Blue Jays

MLB statistics
- Win–loss record: 0–1
- Earned run average: 33.75
- Strikeouts: 1
- Stats at Baseball Reference

Teams
- Toronto Blue Jays (1977)

Michael Edward Darr (born March 23, 1956) is an American former professional baseball pitcher. He played in one game for the Toronto Blue Jays of Major League Baseball (MLB) in their inaugural 1977 season.

== Early years ==
Mike attended Norco High School in Norco, California.

== Career ==
Darr was selected by the Baltimore Orioles in 4th round (96th overall) in the 1974 Major League Baseball draft, and spent three years in the Orioles minor league system, rising to the AA level. He then was selected by Toronto Blue Jays in the 2nd round (17th overall) of the 1976 expansion draft.

Darr spent most of the 1977 season with the Jays' AA affiliate in Jersey City, compiling a 6-13 record with a 6.14 ERA, and more walks (114) than strikeouts (110). Despite these less-than-stellar statistics, Darr was called up to the majors in September.

Darr appeared in just one game for the Blue Jays. On September 6, 1977, at Exhibition Stadium against the Boston Red Sox, Darr was the starting pitcher against "Spaceman" Bill Lee. He pitched an inning and a third before being pulled and replaced by Tom Murphy. In that inning and a third, he gave up three hits, five runs, four walks, hit one batter with a pitch, and had one strike-out. Among the three hits he surrendered was a grand slam to Carlton Fisk. Darr earned the losing decision in the game, finishing his ML career with an ERA of 33.75. Darr did not appear again in a major league game.

Darr toiled for the next two seasons in the Blue Jays minor league system. He spent 1978 in triple-A (where he went 6-16 with a 4.06 ERA, again had more walks than strikeouts, and threw 23 wild pitches) before being demoted down to A-level ball for his final pro season in 1979.

He was the father of Mike Darr, a San Diego Padres outfielder who died at age 25 in a car accident in 2002. A second son, Ryan, would be drafted by the St. Louis Cardinals in 1996 and play minor league baseball for five years.
