= Roy Howell =

American baseball player (born 1953)

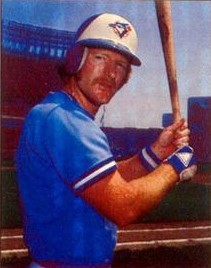
- Third baseman
- Born: December 18, 1953 (age 72); Lompoc, California, U.S.
- Batted: Left Threw: Right

MLB debut
- September 9, 1974, for the Texas Rangers

Last MLB appearance
- September 29, 1984, for the Milwaukee Brewers

MLB statistics
- Batting average: .261
- Home runs: 80
- Runs batted in: 454
- Stats at Baseball Reference

Teams
- Texas Rangers (1974–1977); Toronto Blue Jays (1977–1980); Milwaukee Brewers (1981–1984)

Career highlights and awards
- All-Star (1978)

Roy Lee Howell (born December 18, 1953) is an American former professional baseball third baseman, who played in Major League Baseball (MLB) from 1974–1984 for the Texas Rangers, Toronto Blue Jays, and Milwaukee Brewers.

== Professional career ==
=== Texas Rangers (1974–1977) ===
Howell was selected in the first round, fourth overall by the Texas Rangers in the 1972 MLB draft. He made his major-league debut with the Rangers during the first game of a doubleheader against the California Angels on September 9, 1974. Howell earned his first career hit in the game, a single against the Angels Chuck Dobson in a 3-1 loss. In the second game of the doubleheader, Howell hit his first career home run against Ed Figueroa, as the Rangers defeated California 5-3. Howell appeared in 13 games with the Rangers, hitting .250 with 1 home run and 3 RBI.

Howell became the Rangers starting third baseman in 1975, as in 125 games, he hit .251 with 10 home runs and 51 RBI. In 1976, Howell played in 140 games, batting .253 with 8 home runs and 53 RBI, while recording a league high 28 errors at third base.

In 1977, Howell lost his starting job to Toby Harrah, and in 17 at-bats with the Rangers over seven games, Howell did not record a hit. On May 9, the Rangers traded Howell to the Toronto Blue Jays for Steve Hargan, Jim Mason, and $200,000.

=== Toronto Blue Jays (1977–1980) ===
Howell became the everyday third baseman for the Toronto Blue Jays to finish the 1977 season, and in 96 games with Toronto, he hit .316 with 10 home runs and 44 RBI.

On September 10, 1977, Howell hit 2 home runs, 2 doubles, a single, and collected 9 RBI in a 19-3 win against the Yankees at Yankee Stadium. Howell's franchise record remained unequalled until August 29, 2015, when Edwin Encarnación tied his mark in a 15–1 win over the Detroit Tigers.

In 1978, Howell was selected as a reserve player for the 1978 Major League Baseball All-Star Game. In the fourth inning of the game, Howell entered as a pinch hitter against Steve Rogers of the Montreal Expos, but grounded out to first base to end the inning. He played in 140 games for the Blue Jays that season, hitting .270 with 8 home runs and 61 RBI.

Howell saw his power numbers increase during the 1979 season, as in 138 games, Howell hit 15 home runs and 72 RBI, both the second highest totals on the team, along with a .247 batting average. In 1980, Howell played in a career high 142 games, hitting .269 with 10 home runs and 57 RBI. On October 23, Howell became a free agent.

=== Milwaukee Brewers (1981–1984) ===
On December 20, 1980, Howell signed as a free agent with the Milwaukee Brewers. He suffered through an injury plagued 1981 season, as Howell appeared in 76 games, batting .238 with 6 home runs and 33 RBI, helping the Brewers reach the playoffs. In the 1981 ALDS against the New York Yankees, Howell played in four games, batting .400 in five at-bats, but Milwaukee lost the series.

In 1982, the Brewers used Howell mostly as a designated hitter, and in 98 games, Howell hit .260 with 4 home runs and 38 RBI, helping the team reach the playoffs for the second straight season. In the 1982 ALCS, Howell played in one game, going 0 for 3, as the Brewers defeated the California Angels. In the 1982 World Series against the St. Louis Cardinals, Howell played in four games, going 0 for 11, as Milwaukee lost the series.

Howell played in 69 games with the Brewers in 1983, hitting .278 with 4 home runs and 25 RBI. Howell continued to see limited playing time in 1984, as in 68 games, he hit .232 with 4 home runs and 17 RBI. On October 1, the Brewers released Howell.

He signed with the San Francisco Giants before the 1985 season, however he would be released by the Giants during spring training. He spent the 1985 season with the Portland Beavers of the Pacific Coast League, the Philadelphia Phillies Triple-A affiliate. After the season, Howell retired from baseball.

=== Career statistics ===
In 1112 games over 11 seasons, Howell compiled a .261 batting average (991-for-3791) with 422 runs, 183 doubles, 31 triples, 80 home runs, 454 RBI, 318 walks, 675 strikeouts, .321 on-base percentage and .389 slugging percentage. Defensively, he recorded a .945 fielding percentage at third base and playing several games at first base and left and right field. In 9 postseason games, he batted .105 (2-for-19).

== Post-retirement ==
Following his retirement, Howell coached in the San Diego Padres' farm system, conducted youth baseball clinics in San Luis Obispo, California, and in 2011 became the field manager for the Pennsylvania Road Warriors of the Atlantic League of Professional Baseball, an independent league.

In between, Howell played for the St. Petersburg Pelicans of the Senior Professional Baseball Association in 1990. He then joined the Seattle Mariners as a hitting coach for the Single A High Desert Mavericks and the Double-A Jackson Generals. During 2014 spring training, he was named the manager of the Mariners' Triple-A affiliate, the Tacoma Rainiers of the Pacific Coast League, on March 12, 2014. He succeeded Rich Donnelly, who was promoted to Seattle's third-base coach earlier in spring training before managing a game for Tacoma after the surgery-induced resignation of M's coach John Stearns.

== See also ==
- List of Toronto Blue Jays team records

Preceded by Rich Donnelly	Tacoma Rainiers manager 2014	Succeeded by Pat Listach
