= Bill Singer =

American baseball player (born 1944)

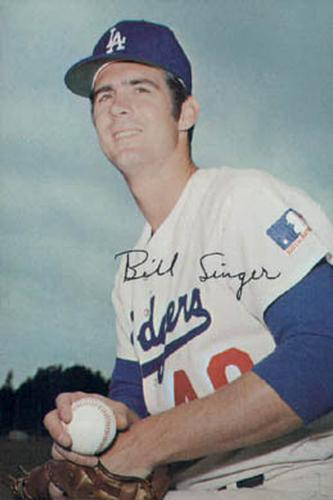
- Pitcher
- Born: April 24, 1944 (age 82); Los Angeles, California, U.S.
- Batted: Right Threw: Right

MLB debut
- September 24, 1964, for the Los Angeles Dodgers

Last MLB appearance
- July 16, 1977, for the Toronto Blue Jays

MLB statistics
- Win–loss record: 118–127
- Earned run average: 3.39
- Strikeouts: 1,515
- Stats at Baseball Reference

Teams
- Los Angeles Dodgers (1964–1972); California Angels (1973–1975); Texas Rangers (1976); Minnesota Twins (1976); Toronto Blue Jays (1977)

Career highlights and awards
- 2× All-Star (1969, 1973); Pitched no-hitter on July 20, 1970

William Robert Singer (born April 24, 1944) is an American former professional baseball pitcher with a 14-year career from 1964 to 1977. He played primarily for the Los Angeles Dodgers (1964–72) and the California Angels (1973–75), spending his final two seasons with the Texas Rangers (1976), Minnesota Twins (1976), and Toronto Blue Jays (1977). His nicknames included "Sing Sing," "Billy No-No" and "The Singer Throwing Machine."

== Major League career ==
=== Los Angeles Dodgers ===
Singer made his major league debut with the Los Angeles Dodgers on September 24, 1964, allowing one run in 6.1 innings in a start against the Chicago Cubs, as he had a no-decision in a 4-3 loss at Wrigley Field. Singer made one more start in 1964, allowing 4 runs in 7.2 innings in a 4-3 loss to the Cubs at Dodger Stadium.

During the next two seasons, Singer saw very little action with the Dodgers, pitching five innings in five games, as he spent most of his time in the minor leagues.

He had his first full season in Los Angeles in 1967, as Singer had an impressive 12-8 record with a 2.64 ERA in 32 games, 29 of them starts. In 1968, Singer had a very solid ERA of 2.88, however, he had a losing record of 13-17.

During this period, the legendary Dodger announcer, Vin Scully, referred to Singer as "the Singer Throwing Machine."

Singer had a breakout season in 1969, tying with Claude Osteen with a club high 20 wins, as he had a 20-12 record with a club best 2.34 ERA. Singer played in the 1969 Major League Baseball All-Star Game held at RFK Stadium in Washington, D.C., pitching two scoreless innings in the National League's 9-3 win. That year Singer also became the first pitcher to be officially credited with a save. The statistic was made official in 1969, and Singer recorded his on April 7, when he took over from Don Drysdale and secured a 3-2 victory over the Cincinnati Reds at Crosley Field.

He ran into injury problems in 1970, making only 16 starts, but had a record of 8-5 with a 3.13 ERA. After contracting hepatitis early in the season, he made a comeback, being named the NL Player of the Month for July as he had a 5-0 record with a 1.84 ERA. One of those July victories, on the 20th, was a 5-0 no-hitter over the Philadelphia Phillies at Dodger Stadium. His season ended when he broke a finger.

Singer was the Dodgers opening day starter in 1971. However he struggled throughout the season, with a 10-17 record and a 4.16 ERA. He continued to struggle throughout the 1972 season, going only 6-16 with a 3.67 ERA.

On November 28, 1972, the Dodgers traded Singer, Billy Grabarkewitz, Frank Robinson, Mike Strahler, and Bobby Valentine to the California Angels for Ken McMullen and Andy Messersmith .

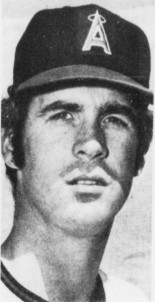
Singer, circa 1975

=== California Angels ===
Singer had a very strong 1973 season with the Angels, tying a career high with 20 wins, as he was 20-14 with a 3.22 ERA in 40 starts. Singer played in the 1973 Major League Baseball All-Star Game held at Kauffman Stadium in Kansas City, where he allowed three runs in two innings as the American League lost 7-1.

Singer's season was shortened by back problems in 1974. He made 14 starts, earning a 7-4 record with a 2.98 ERA. He struggled in the 1975 season, going 7-15 with a 4.98 ERA.

=== Texas Rangers and Minnesota Twins ===
Singer was sent from the Angels to the Texas Rangers for Jim Spencer and $100,000 on December 10, 1975. He began the 1976 in Texas, and pitched well with them, going 4-1 with a 3.48 ERA in 10 starts. He was dealt along with Roy Smalley III, Mike Cubbage, Jim Gideon and $250,000 from the Rangers to the Minnesota Twins for Bert Blyleven and Danny Thompson on June 1.

He finished the 1976 season with the Twins, making 26 starts, and finishing with a 9-9 record and a 3.77 ERA in Minnesota.

=== Toronto Blue Jays ===
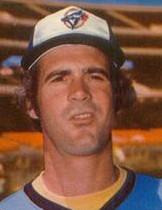
Singer's 1977 Hostess baseball card, with painted Toronto Blue Jays logo

On November 5, 1976, the Toronto Blue Jays drafted Singer in the 1976 MLB Expansion Draft with the 28th overall selection. As a previous 20-game winner, Singer was one of the focal points of the Blue Jays initial marketing campaign. He was nearly traded for Ron Guidry in a transaction approved by the Yankees but vetoed by Blue Jays president Peter Bavasi.

Singer started the Blue Jays' first spring training game on March 11, 1977 at Grant Field in Dunedin, Florida. He surrendered a lead-off homerun to the Mets' Lee Mazzilli before the Blue Jays came back to win 3-1.

Singer was also the opening day starter for the expansion Blue Jays in 1977. He gave up 11 hits and 3 walks in 4.1 innings, and garnered a no-decision in Toronto's 9-5 win over the Chicago White Sox on a snowy afternoon at Exhibition Stadium. Singer struggled with the Blue Jays, and spent six weeks on the disabled list in June and July 1977. Singer was ineffective in his return to the rotation on July 13, 1977 and was moved to the bullpen. On July 16, after a relief appearance, he was shut down for the rest of the season, and never again pitched in the major or minor leagues. He finished the 1977 season 2-8 with a 6.79 ERA.

Singer did not pitch during the 1978 season and was released from the Blue Jays on December 2, 1978. He then retired, finishing his career with a 118-127 record, a 3.39 ERA and 1,515 strikeouts.

== Post-playing career ==
After retirement he held various scouting and consulting positions with Florida Marlins, Pittsburgh Pirates, Los Angeles Dodgers, and the New York Mets.

In 2003, Singer was terminated from his position as special assistant to General Manager Jim Duquette of the New York Mets after Singer disparaged the Los Angeles Dodgers' assistant general manager Kim Ng during general manager meetings with nonsensical mock Chinese while asking about her background. The incident was reported by ESPN and the Los Angeles Times. He later apologized, and blamed the Atkins diet and being drunk as the reasons for his remarks.

He was later hired by the Arizona Diamondbacks as a Major League scout in February 2005, with the Diamondbacks GM Joe Garagiola Jr stating, "We satisfied ourselves by talking to him, to other people about him and doing a thorough background check." In 2006, the Washington Nationals hired Singer as a scout and promoted him to director of professional scouting in 2009.

Preceded by Clyde Wright	No-hitter pitcher July 20, 1970	Succeeded by Vida Blue
Preceded by Tommie Agee	Major League Player of the Month; July, 1970	Succeeded by Bob Gibson
Preceded by Claude Osteen	Los Angeles Dodgers Opening Day; Starting pitcher 1971	Succeeded by Don Sutton
Preceded by None	Toronto Blue Jays Opening Day; Starting pitcher 1977	Succeeded by Dave Lemanczyk
