= Tim Nordbrook =

American baseball player (born 1949)

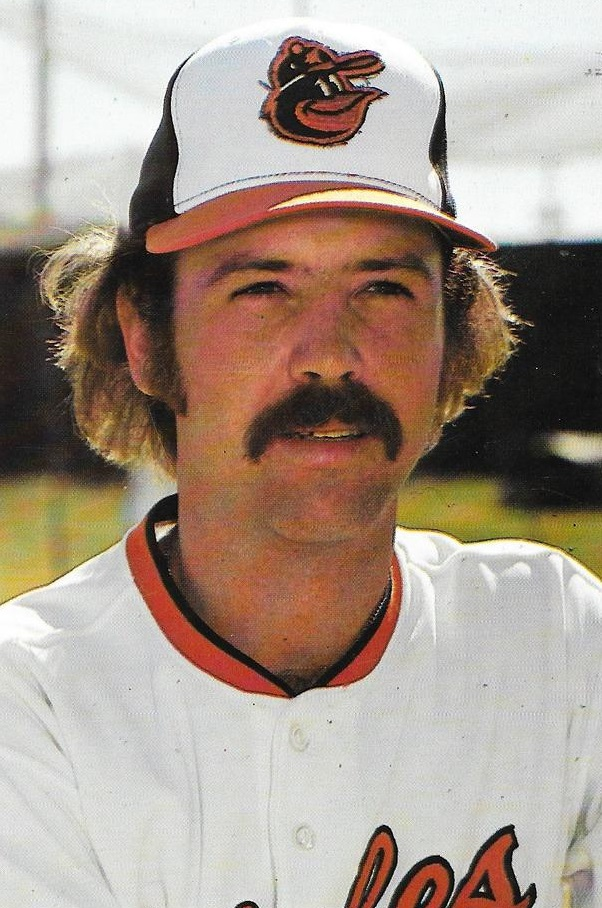
- Shortstop
- Born: July 7, 1949 (age 76); Baltimore, Maryland, U.S.
- Batted: Right Threw: Right

MLB debut
- September 13, 1974, for the Baltimore Orioles

Last MLB appearance
- June 10, 1979, for the Milwaukee Brewers

MLB statistics
- Batting average: .178
- Home runs: 0
- Runs batted in: 3
- Stats at Baseball Reference

Teams
- Baltimore Orioles (1974–1976); California Angels (1976); Chicago White Sox (1977); Toronto Blue Jays (1977–1978); Milwaukee Brewers (1978–1979)

Timothy Charles Nordbrook (born July 7, 1949) is an American former professional baseball player who played six seasons for the Baltimore Orioles, California Angels, Chicago White Sox, Toronto Blue Jays, and Milwaukee Brewers of Major League Baseball. Because he left the Angels in 1976 as a free agent, the Angels were entitled to an extra signing in that year's crop of free agents—the first.

After his playing career was over, Nordbrook became a manager in the Milwaukee Brewers farm system. Midway through the 1984 season, the Brewers fired Nordbrook. In the first half of the season, he was suspended for four games after bumping umpire Joe Burelson. In the second half of the season, Stockton got off to a slow start. Nordbrook was fired and replaced by Mike Pazik, who himself was later replaced by Andy Etchebarren.

Nordbrook attended Loyola High School in Towson, Maryland and Loyola University New Orleans where he played college baseball and college basketball for the Loyola Wolf Pack. He was drafted by the Baltimore Orioles in the 9th round (222nd overall) of the 1970 MLB June Amateur Draft.
