= Alvis Woods =

American baseball player (born 1953)

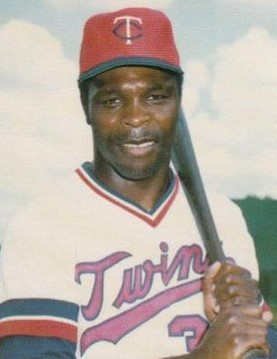
- Left fielder
- Born: August 8, 1953 (age 72); Oakland, California, U.S.
- Batted: Left Threw: Left

MLB debut
- April 7, 1977, for the Toronto Blue Jays

Last MLB appearance
- October 2, 1986, for the Minnesota Twins

MLB statistics
- Batting average: .271
- Home runs: 35
- Runs batted in: 196
- Stats at Baseball Reference

Teams
- Toronto Blue Jays (1977–1982); Minnesota Twins (1986)

Alvis "Al" Woods (born August 8, 1953) is an American former professional baseball player. He played all or part of seven seasons in Major League Baseball between 1977 and 1986, primarily as a left fielder. He batted and threw left-handed.

== Career ==
Woods was originally drafted by the Montreal Expos in 1971, however he did not sign until being drafted by the Minnesota Twins the following season. He spent several seasons in the minor leagues before being selected by the Toronto Blue Jays in the 1976 Major League Baseball expansion draft.

Woods was on the Opening Day roster for the Blue Jays' inaugural season. In his—and the team's—first major league game, on April 7, 1977, he entered the game in the fifth inning as a pinch hitter for right fielder Steve Bowling. He proceeded to homer in his first at bat, on the fifth pitch he saw, off Chicago White Sox relief pitcher Francisco Barrios.

He ended the 1977 season with a .284 batting average having appeared in 122 games as the regular Blue Jays left fielder.

Woods enjoyed a good season in 1979, appearing in a career-high 132 games while hitting .278 with 33 extra-base hits. In 1980, he recorded career highs in average (.300), home runs (15) and RBI (47). The next two years he shared outfield duties with George Bell, Lloyd Moseby, Garth Iorg and Barry Bonnell, and also saw action as a designated hitter.

Following the 1982 season, Woods was traded to the Oakland Athletics for Cliff Johnson. The A's released him during spring training, and he re-signed to a minor league contract with the Blue Jays in July. He spent the next two seasons with the Triple-A Syracuse Chiefs, and was released by the Blue Jays at the end of the 1984 season.

Woods returned to the Minnesota Twins for the 1985 season, spending the entire year with the Triple-A Toledo Mud Hens. He started 1986 with Toledo, but received a brief call-up in May, and again was brought up to the majors when rosters expanded in September. He became a free agent after the season, and subsequently retired.

Overall, in a seven-season career, Woods was a .271 hitter with 35 home runs and 196 RBI in 618 games.

== See also ==
- List of Major League Baseball players with a home run in their first major league at bat
