= Sam Ewing =

American baseball player (born 1949)

- Outfielder / Designated hitter
- Born: April 9, 1949 (age 77); Lewisburg, Tennessee, U.S.
- Batted: left Threw: right

Professional debut
- MLB: September 11, 1973, for the Chicago White Sox
- NPB: April 7, 1979, for the Nippon-Ham Fighters

Last appearance
- MLB: October 1, 1978, for the Toronto Blue Jays
- NPB: October 10, 1979, for the Nippon-Ham Fighters

MLB statistics
- Batting average: .255
- Home runs: 6
- Runs batted in: 47
- Stats at Baseball Reference

Teams
- Chicago White Sox (1973, 1976); Toronto Blue Jays (1977–1978); Nippon-Ham Fighters (1979)
Medals
Men's baseball
Representing United States
Amateur World Series
Silver medal – second place	1970 Cartagena	Team

Samuel James Ewing (born 9 April 1949) is an American former baseball player for the Chicago White Sox and the Toronto Blue Jays. He batted left and threw right.

== Education ==
Ewing graduated from John Overton Comprehensive High School in 1966, and received a bachelor's degree from University of Tennessee. He got his master's degree in Exercise Physiology and worked on his doctorate in Sports Psychology and physiology at Michigan State University.

== Career ==
Ewing attended the University of Tennessee, where he was an All-American. Ewing had a collegiate batting average of .412, hitting a high of .464 in his junior year. In 1970, Ewing was chosen to represent the US in the World Amateur games in Colombia. The USA was beaten in extra games by Cuba. Ewing played left field in most games and was one of only seven players on that team to later play in the major leagues.

Ewing was drafted in the first round by both the Montreal Expos (1969) and Chicago White Sox.

In Ewing's first major league game, he was struck out four straight times by Nolan Ryan, who struck out 17 with the California Angels. He played for the Chicago White Sox in 1973 and 1976, and was selected by the Toronto Blue Jays in the 1976 Major League Baseball expansion draft. For the Blue Jays in 1977 he hit .287 in 97 games as an outfielder, designated hitter, and first baseman.

Throughout his major league career, Ewing was used primarily against right-handed pitchers, gaining only 20 at-bats in his entire MLB career against southpaws — however, he hit left-handed pitchers for a .300 career average and in 1978 had a two-run homer in his only plate appearance against a lefty that season. Ewing was used almost exclusively as a pinch hitter in 1978, with only seven starts as a DH and two as a right fielder. His final American League game was on October 1, 1978.

In 1979 he went to play with the Nippon-Ham Fighters in Japan, where he batted .287 with 15 home runs and 65 runs batted in.

Returning from Japan, Ewing joined his former AAA team and, after the firing of the manager, accepted the managing job offered by longtime owner Ray Johnstone. The following year he managed the Appleton Foxes (Midwest League) to a fourth-place finish; he was released by management the following year.
