= Jesse Jefferson =

American baseball player (1949–2011)

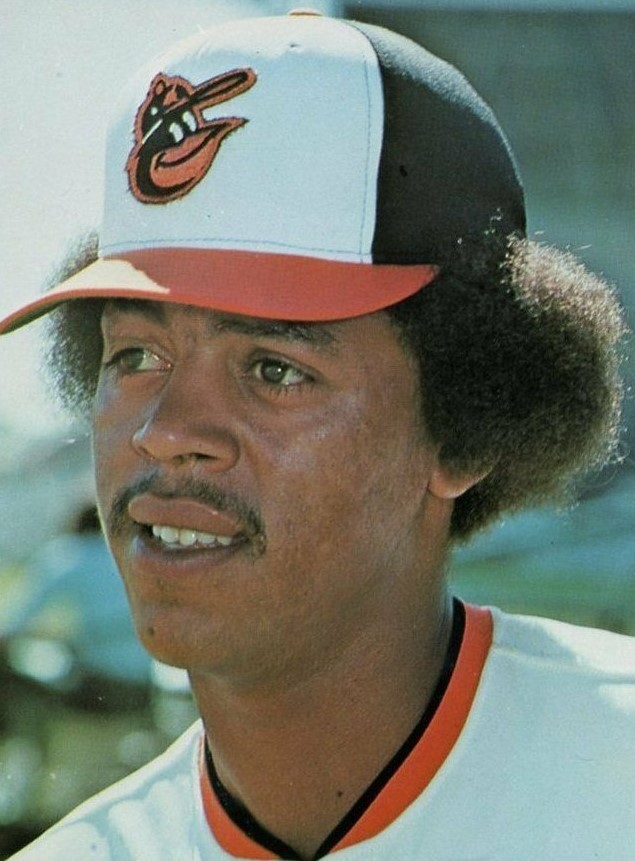
- Pitcher
- Born: March 3, 1949; Midlothian, Virginia, U.S.
- Died: September 8, 2011 (aged 62); Midlothian, Virginia, U.S.
- Batted: Left Threw: Right

MLB debut
- June 23, 1973, for the Baltimore Orioles

Last MLB appearance
- September 30, 1981, for the California Angels

MLB statistics
- Win–loss record: 39–81
- Earned run average: 4.81
- Strikeouts: 522
- Stats at Baseball Reference

Teams
- Baltimore Orioles (1973–1975); Chicago White Sox (1975–1976); Toronto Blue Jays (1977–1980); Pittsburgh Pirates (1980); California Angels (1981)

Jesse Harrison Jefferson (March 3, 1949 – September 8, 2011) was an American professional baseball pitcher with the Baltimore Orioles (1973–1975), Chicago White Sox (1975–1976), Toronto Blue Jays (1977–1980), Pittsburgh Pirates (1980) and California Angels (1981) of Major League Baseball (MLB). Jefferson batted left-handed and threw right-handed.

== Career ==
=== Baltimore Orioles ===
Jefferson was drafted by the Baltimore Orioles in the 1968 Major League Baseball draft out of Carver High School in Midlothian, Virginia. He went 40–50 with a 3.71 earned run average over six seasons in the Orioles' farm system when he debuted with the club in 1973. He pitched a ten-inning complete game in his major league debut on June 23. In the second game of a doubleheader with the Boston Red Sox at Fenway Park, he nearly pitched a five-hit shutout; Rico Petrocelli hit a solo home run to tie the score with two outs in the ninth inning. The Orioles responded with a run in the top of the tenth inning to earn Jefferson the win.

Jefferson's rookie season was his only winning season, as he went 6–5 with a 4.11 ERA as a spot starter and middle inning relief pitcher. The Orioles captured the American League East crown, and manager Earl Weaver had Jefferson slated to be his long reliever in the post season, but he did not make an appearance in the 1973 American League Championship Series with the Oakland Athletics. Jefferson moved into the bullpen in 1974, making just two spot starts, both against the Red Sox.

=== Chicago White Sox ===
After going 0–2 in four games during the first 2 1/2 months of the campaign, Jefferson was traded from the Orioles to the White Sox for Tony Muser in one of two transactions made by Chicago at the non-waiver trade deadline on June 15, 1975. With the Chisox, Jefferson was moved back into the starting rotation, compiling a 5–9 record with a 5.10 ERA. He split the 1976 between starts and the bullpen before he was lost to the Toronto Blue Jays in the 1976 Major League Baseball expansion draft.

=== Toronto Blue Jays ===
Jefferson set many career highs with the Blue Jays in 1977. His 33 starts and 217 innings pitched were by far his best. Despite setting a Blue Jay franchise record with nine walks in a game against Baltimore on June 18, Jefferson's strikeout-to-walk ratio was also a career best 1.37 as he struck out 114 batters versus 83 walks.

Perhaps the most memorable outing of Jefferson's career came on May 16, 1980, against eventual 22–game winner Mike Norris and the Oakland A's. Jefferson held the A's to just four hits over 11 innings while striking out ten. Norris was equally brilliant, but the Jays managed to squeak out a run in the bottom of the 11th to earn Jefferson the win.

After that performance, Jefferson lost his next five decisions. He made his final appearance for Toronto on September 1, facing five batters and retiring just one while giving up three earned runs, allowing an inherited runner to score and committing an error. He was placed on waivers with a 4–13 record and a 5.47 ERA.

He was selected off waivers by the Pittsburgh Pirates on September 11, and made just one appearance for the club, beating the Chicago Cubs.

Following the season, he signed as a free agent with the California Angels. He started the 1981 season in the Angels' starting rotation, but after going 0–4 with a 4.68 ERA in his first five starts, was moved into the bullpen. He pitched far better in relief, going 2–0 with a 1.04 ERA in 21 appearances. He spent spring training 1982 with the Orioles, but did not make the club.

== Death ==
In 2011, Jefferson died of prostate cancer.
