= Dennis DeBarr =

American baseball player (born 1953)

- Pitcher
- Born: January 16, 1953 (age 73); Cheyenne, Wyoming, U.S.
- Batted: Left Threw: Left

MLB debut
- May 14, 1977, for the Toronto Blue Jays

Last MLB appearance
- July 26, 1977, for the Toronto Blue Jays

MLB statistics
- Win–loss record: 0–1
- Earned run average: 5.91
- Strikeouts: 10
- Stats at Baseball Reference

Teams
- Toronto Blue Jays (1977)

Dennis Lee DeBarr (born January 16, 1953) is an American former professional baseball pitcher for the Toronto Blue Jays of Major League Baseball.

DeBarr was orphaned at an early age, when both parents were killed in a traffic accident. Born in Wyoming, he grew up in Fremont, California.

Originally drafted by the Detroit Tigers in the 1971 amateur draft, DeBarr was selected by the Toronto Blue Jays in the 1976 MLB expansion draft. He was credited with the victory in the Blue Jays first-ever spring training game, a 3-1 win over the New York Mets in which DeBarr pitched two scoreless innings. He did not make the club out of spring training, but appeared in 14 games as a relief pitcher for the Blue Jays inaugural 1977 season, after being called up in mid-May. Used mostly in mop-up situations, DeBarr was not pleased with his lack of pitching opportunities, and was not shy about expressing it. Unfortunately, in what would turn out to be his final major league game on July 26, he gave up three earned runs in two-thirds of an inning, and reacted poorly when he was pulled from the game. "I got frustrated and then I threw my glove in the dugout and actually left the game before it was over with," he later recalled. DeBarr was sent down to the minors a day later, and never made it back to the majors.

DeBarr was traded from the Blue Jays to the Cleveland Indians for Rico Carty on March 15, 1978. Later that same year, the Indians traded him to the Cubs for Paul Reuschel. DeBarr was released by the Cubs after 1978; he pitched in the Oakland A's system in 1979 before his career ended.

"I got out of the game not because I couldn't pitch. I got out of the game because my mouth kind of got in the way," he said in a 2011 interview. "You don't really cherish things until after you are out. I do miss it."
