= Doug Ault =

American baseball player (1950–2004)

- Ault during his time at Texas Tech
- First baseman
- Born: March 9, 1950; Beaumont, Texas, U.S.
- Died: December 22, 2004 (aged 54); Tarpon Springs, Florida, U.S.
- Batted: Right Threw: Left

Professional debut
- MLB: September 9, 1976, for the Texas Rangers
- NPB: April 4, 1981, for the Hanshin Tigers

Last appearance
- MLB: October 5, 1980, for the Toronto Blue Jays
- NPB: October 12, 1981, for the Hanshin Tigers

MLB statistics
- Batting average: .236
- Home runs: 17
- Runs batted in: 86

NPB statistics
- Batting average: .307
- Home runs: 18
- Runs batted in: 59
- Stats at Baseball Reference

Teams
- Texas Rangers (1976); Toronto Blue Jays (1977–1978, 1980); Hanshin Tigers (1981)

Douglas Reagan Ault (March 9, 1950 – December 22, 2004) was an American professional baseball first baseman and designated hitter who played for the Texas Rangers (1976) and Toronto Blue Jays (1977–1978, 1980). He is best known for hitting the first two home runs in Blue Jays history, in the team's first Major League Baseball (MLB) game on April 7, 1977, a 9–5 Toronto win against the Chicago White Sox.

== Career ==
A native of Beaumont, Texas, Ault was a varsity baseball star at Texas Tech. He was drafted three times in the MLB draft, but refused to sign. He was finally signed by the home state Rangers in 1973 as an amateur free agent. He advanced relatively quickly though the minor League hierarchy, making the majors in 1976 as a late season replacement. With Mike Hargrove at first base, Ault became available in the 1976 Major League Baseball expansion draft where he was drafted by the Blue Jays. He became the starting first baseman in their first regular season game in 1977, and his actions that day (two home runs, including the very first hit, run and home run in Blue Jays history) briefly turned Ault into the Blue Jays first "star" player. Although Ault led the club in RBIs that year, his career didn't last -- he was little used in 1978, spent all of 1979 in the minors, and was out of the majors after 1980.

He managed in the minor Leagues for several years, leading the Syracuse Chiefs to a pennant in 1985. He retired in 1994, and went to the automobile business, but a series of personal tragedies and business failures plagued him in later life. Ault died by suicide on December 22, 2004.

== Playing career ==
Doug Ault was born in Beaumont, Texas. When he was young, Ault credited his eldest sister Brenda as his main influence in baseball, for training him every day at the local baseball park and attending all his games as an amateur. He was varsity baseball star at Texas Tech. He was drafted on three occasions, by the Pittsburgh Pirates in 1969, the San Diego Padres in the second round in the 1970 January secondary draft, and by the Cleveland Indians in the 1970 June secondary draft, but never signed. While at Texas Tech he hit .473 his senior year and was named to the 1972 College Baseball All-America Team.

He was signed by the Rangers in 1973 as an amateur free agent. He was sent to Gastonia in the Western Carolina League where he led the league in home runs with 19 in his first season playing professionally. Within the next few years, Ault became a top prospect. In 1976, Ault played in 143 games for the Sacramento Solons of the Pacific Coast League leading the league in runs with 112 and total bases (278) while finishing third in home runs (25), and hits (168). Meanwhile, he worked the off-season in an oil-platform.

== Major league career (1976–1980) ==
=== Texas Rangers (1976) ===
Ault made his Major League Baseball debut with the Texas Rangers on September 9, 1976, and in his first at-bat, he struck out against Dave Goltz of the Minnesota Twins in the second inning. Ault later singled in the fifth inning off Goltz to record his first career hit. However, the Rangers lost to the Twins 6–0. Ault finished the season appearing in nine games with the Rangers, hitting .300 with six hits in 20 at-bats.

=== Toronto Blue Jays (1977–1980) ===
On November 5, the Toronto Blue Jays selected Ault with the 32nd overall pick in the 1976 MLB expansion draft. He considered that day as "grateful" as it gave him an opportunity to play every day in the major leagues, as he was blocked at first base by All-Star Mike Hargrove while at Texas. During spring training, Ault competed with veterans Nate Colbert and Ron Fairly for the starting first base position.

On April 7, 1977, Ault was the Blue Jays' starting first baseman versus the Chicago White Sox, in the team's first professional game. In bottom of the first inning, Ault, batting third in the lineup, slugged the first home run (and first hit) in Blue Jays' history off White Sox starting pitcher Ken Brett. He hit another home run off Brett in the third inning, tying a major league record for most home runs in an Opening Day game. Those were the first two home runs of Ault's career (Ault also had an RBI single and a walk in the game), and the Blue Jays defeated the White Sox 9–5. George Bell of the Blue Jays broke the record when he hit three home runs on Opening Day in 1988, and was matched by Tuffy Rhodes of the Chicago Cubs in 1994 and Dmitri Young of the Detroit Tigers in 2005. Ault was covered with "immediate acclaim and nationwide publicity" as a result of the feat.

He finished his rookie season hitting .245 with 11 home runs and 64 runs batted in during 129 games. His 64 runs batted in tied Ault with Fairly to lead the Blue Jays in that category, and was a Blue Jays rookie record until Eric Hinske drove in 84 runs in 2002.

With the Blue Jays acquiring first baseman John Mayberry, Ault was limited to 54 games in 1978, in which he hit .240 with three home runs and collected seven runs batted in over 104 at-bats.

He spent the entire 1979 season with the Syracuse Chiefs, the Blue Jays Triple-A affiliate, before reappearing with the Blue Jays in 1980. In 64 games in 1980, Ault hit .194 with three home runs and fifteen runs batted in. All three home runs came against Cleveland at Municipal Stadium, in a series played in early August. Ault played his final career game with the Jays on October 5, 1980.

After his time with Toronto, Ault played with the Hanshin Tigers in the Japanese Central League in 1981, before returning to the Chiefs in 1982. Ault also spent some time with the Mexico City Tigres of the Mexican League in 1982.

Ault finished his career with a .236 batting average, hitting 17 home runs and recording 86 runs batted in, playing 256 games, 247 of them with the Toronto Blue Jays.

== Managing career ==
Following his playing career, Ault served as a manager in the Blue Jays organization for the single-A teams Dunedin, Kinston, Myrtle Beach and St. Catharines. He was promoted to manage his former club, the Triple-A Syracuse Chiefs of the International League in 1985, where he managed them to a pennant that same season, the first in club history. As a result, he won the International League Manager of the Year Award. He lasted with the Chiefs until 1987. In 1992, he won the South Atlantic League championship with the Myrtle Beach Hurricanes.

== Later life and death ==
Ault and his first wife Julie had one child, Joshua. They divorced in 1990. After the completion of his baseball managing career in 1994, Ault became a car salesman, first in Texas, then in Clearwater, Florida, where he moved to be closer to the Blue Jays spring training site.

He married his second wife, Lynn Marie, an obstetrician, in 2000. In 2002, she lost her medical license for violating Florida statutes regarding patient safety; a year later, she filed bankruptcy. In January 2004, their home in Tarpon Springs, Florida was sold though a bankruptcy proceeding, and they were separated for "a while". A few months later, Ault's first wife Julie died, after which he left his job at a Clearwater car dealership. According to some of his former teammates, at the time of his death "things were not going great" for Ault.

Ault died at his home in Tarpon Springs on December 22 of a self-inflicted gunshot wound. It was ruled a suicide by the coroner's office on December 28.
