= Pete Vuckovich =

American baseball player (born 1952)

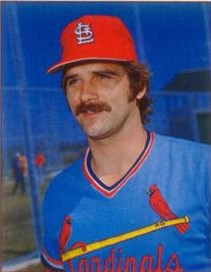
- Pitcher
- Born: October 27, 1952 (age 73); Johnstown, Pennsylvania, U.S.
- Batted: Right Threw: Right

MLB debut
- August 3, 1975, for the Chicago White Sox

Last MLB appearance
- October 2, 1986, for the Milwaukee Brewers

MLB statistics
- Win–loss record: 93–69
- Earned run average: 3.66
- Strikeouts: 882
- Stats at Baseball Reference

Teams
- Chicago White Sox (1975–1976); Toronto Blue Jays (1977); St. Louis Cardinals (1978–1980); Milwaukee Brewers (1981–1986)

Career highlights and awards
- AL Cy Young Award (1982); AL wins leader (1981); Milwaukee Brewers Wall of Honor

Peter Dennis Vuckovich (/ˈvukoʊvɪtʃ/ VOO-koh-vitch; born October 27, 1952) is an American former professional baseball starting pitcher who played eleven seasons in Major League Baseball (MLB) from 1975 to 1986. He came across as an intimidating presence on the mound with his 6 ft 4 in (1.93 m) 215 pounds (98 kg) frame and horseshoe moustache. Vuckovich was drafted by the Chicago White Sox in 1974.

In addition to his notable 12-year career as a professional baseball player, he is known for his role as fictional Yankees slugger Clu Haywood, the chief nemesis of Charlie Sheen's character Ricky Vaughn, in the popular 1989 film Major League.

Vuckovich graduated from Conemaugh Valley High School then went on to Clarion University to play baseball. Vuckovich, winner of the 1982 AL Cy Young Award, is a member of the Clarion University Sports Hall of Fame. He is also a member of both the Western Pennsylvania Sports Hall of Fame and the Pennsylvania Sports Hall of Fame.

== Early life ==
Vuckovich was born on October 27, 1952, in Johnstown, Pennsylvania, to Serbian parents. His father Lazo, was a steel-mill worker and his mother Bosiljka (née Gjurich), was a homemaker.

He graduated from Conemaugh Valley High School in 1970 where he played baseball, football and basketball. Afterwards, he attended Clarion State College. He was drafted by the Chicago White Sox in the third round of the 1974 MLB Amateur Draft.

== Baseball career ==
=== Toronto Blue Jays and St. Louis Cardinals ===
After minimal duty with Chicago from 1975 to 1976, Vuckovich was selected by the Toronto Blue Jays in the 1976 MLB expansion draft. Even though the Blue Jays lost 107 games in 1977, and although mostly used in relief, Vuckovich managed a 7–7 record with eight saves. He recorded the first shutout in Toronto franchise history, a 2–0 victory over Jim Palmer and the Orioles. He also recorded the first save in Toronto franchise history on Opening Day on April 7, 1977, at Exhibition Stadium in Toronto, versus the Chicago White Sox.

Involved in a multi-player trade to the St. Louis Cardinals, Vuckovich's career went to the next level. In 1978, he started more often, winning 39 games for the Cardinals during three years. He finished third in the National League in ERA with a 2.55 mark in 1978, and ranked fourth in shutouts (3) in 1980.

=== Milwaukee Brewers ===
1982 photo of Vuckovich for Milwaukee Brewers

A part of a blockbuster seven-player trade in December 1980, Vuckovich went to the Milwaukee Brewers along with Rollie Fingers and Ted Simmons.

With the Brewers, Vuckovich continued his stellar pitching. He led the American League in wins (14) and winning percentage Win–loss % (.778) during the strike-shortened 1981 season. When Milwaukee won the AL pennant in 1982, Vuckovich won the Cy Young Award with an 18–6 record and a 3.34 ERA, and once again tied for the league lead with the Baltimore Orioles' Jim Palmer in winning percentage Win–loss % (.750).

Vuckovich lost Game 2 of the ALCS to the Angels 4–2, and started the decisive fifth game, although he did not figure in the decision. In the 1982 World Series, the Cardinals beat him 6–2 in Game Three, and he got a no-decision in the final loss.

This would, however, prove to be the zenith of his career, as Vuckovich had been battling shoulder pain for two seasons, and in spring training of 1983, it was discovered he had torn his rotator cuff. Vuckovich skipped surgery in favor of an exercise rehabilitation. He attempted a comeback for three games, but went 0–2 in 14 innings, then missed all of 1984. Subsequent and prolonged comeback attempts all failed, and by the end of the 1986 season, Milwaukee released Vuckovich.

In an eleven-season career, Vuckovich posted a 93–69 record with 882 strikeouts and a 3.66 ERA in 1455.1 innings pitched. In postseason play, he was 1–2 with a 3.74 ERA.

While with the Brewers, Vuckovich co-owned a bar in Milwaukee with outfielder Gorman Thomas. It was called "Stormin' & Vuke's", a play on their nicknames.

=== Following retirement ===
Following his retirement, Vuckovich worked for three years (1989–1991) as a television announcer for the Milwaukee Brewers. Vuckovich portrayed fictional Yankees slugger Clu Haywood in David S. Ward's film Major League. Upon seeing Vuckovich, who the filmmakers had in mind for playing a relief pitcher, Ward saw him as the right look for an imposing hitter.

In 1992, he was hired by the Pittsburgh Pirates as a pitching instructor. Vuckovich served as the pitching coach for the Pittsburgh Pirates for the 1997–2000 seasons. He then worked his way through the Pirates organization to the position of special assistant to the general manager with the Pirates, and held a similar post with the Seattle Mariners' organization under Jack Zduriencik, Seattle's GM from 2009 to 2015. In 2016, Vuckovich served as a professional scout with the Arizona Diamondbacks.

== Personal life ==
Vuckovich resides in Johnstown with his wife Annie. His son, Pete Vuckovich Jr. was drafted by the White Sox in the 48th round of the 2004 amateur draft nearly 30 years to the day after he was drafted. Like his father, Vuckovich Jr. also attended both Conemaugh Valley High School and Clarion University.

== See also ==
- List of Major League Baseball annual wins leaders
