= Al Fitzmorris =

American baseball player (1946–2024)

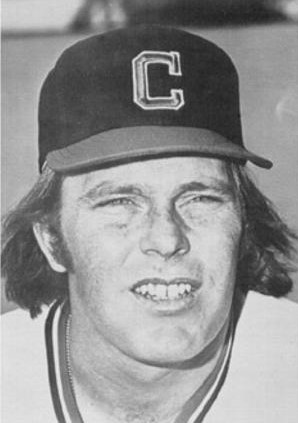
- Fitzmorris in 1978
- Pitcher
- Born: March 21, 1946; Buffalo, New York, U.S.
- Died: December 4, 2024 (aged 78); Kansas City, Missouri, U.S.
- Batted: Switch Threw: Right

MLB debut
- September 8, 1969, for the Kansas City Royals

Last MLB appearance
- September 29, 1978, for the California Angels

MLB statistics
- Win–loss record: 77–59
- Earned run average: 3.65
- Strikeouts: 458
- Stats at Baseball Reference

Teams
- Kansas City Royals (1969–1976); Cleveland Indians (1977–1978); California Angels (1978)

Alan James Fitzmorris (March 21, 1946 – December 4, 2024) was an American professional baseball pitcher. He played in Major League Baseball (MLB) from 1969 to 1978 for the Kansas City Royals, Cleveland Indians, and California Angels.

== Career ==
Fitzmorris signed as a non-drafted free agent with the Chicago White Sox in 1966.

The Kansas City Royals selected Fitzmorris with the 40th overall pick in the 1968 Major League Baseball expansion draft. Fitzmorris won a career high 16 games for the Royals in 1975. He stayed with the Royals through the 1976 season.

On November 5 of that year, the Toronto Blue Jays picked him up as the 13th pick overall in the expansion draft, although he was almost immediately traded on the same day by Toronto to the Cleveland Indians in exchange for catcher Alan Ashby and INF/OF Doug Howard.

The Indians released him on July 13, 1978, and before a week was out he was signed by the California Angels on July 18.

Granted free agency in November of that year, he signed on with the San Diego Padres in February 1979 retiring at the end of that season at age 33 after playing only with their Triple-A affiliate, the Hawaii Islanders, in the Pacific Coast League.

== Later life and death ==
After retiring from baseball, he remained involved in the Kansas City community, supporting numerous charitable organizations. He died after a long battle with cancer in Kansas City, on December 4, 2024, at the age of 78.
