= Dave Lemanczyk =

American baseball player (born 1950)

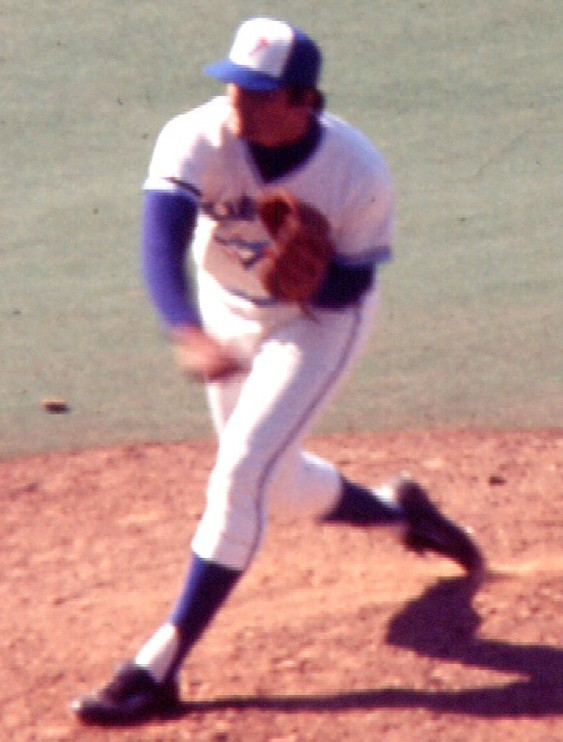
- Lemanczyk with the Blue Jays in 1977
- Pitcher
- Born: August 17, 1950 (age 75); Syracuse, New York, U.S.
- Batted: Right Threw: Right

MLB debut
- April 15, 1973, for the Detroit Tigers

Last MLB appearance
- September 27, 1980, for the California Angels

MLB statistics
- Win–loss record: 37–63
- Earned run average: 4.62
- Strikeouts: 429
- Stats at Baseball Reference

Teams
- Detroit Tigers (1973–1976); Toronto Blue Jays (1977–1980); California Angels (1980)

Career highlights and awards
- All-Star (1979)

David Lawrence Lemanczyk (/lʌˈmæntʃɪk/ luh-MAN-chik; born August 17, 1950) is an American former pitcher with an eight-year Major League Baseball career from 1973 to 1980. He played for the Detroit Tigers, Toronto Blue Jays and California Angels, all of the American League.

== Early life and amateur career ==
Lemanczyk attended Westhill Senior High School and played college baseball and basketball for the Hartwick Hawks.

== Major League career ==
=== Detroit Tigers ===
Lemanczyk was drafted by the Tigers in the 16th round of the 1972 MLB draft.

He made his MLB debut on April 15, 1973, his only major league game that season, allowing three runs in 2 1/3 innings as the Tigers lost 7-0 to the Cleveland Indians.

In 1974, Lemanczyk appeared in 22 games with Detroit, three of them starts, as he had a 2-1 record and a 4.00 ERA. He made his first career start on August 2, earning his first victory in a 4-1 win over the Milwaukee Brewers as he allowed one run in seven innings.

Lemanczyk struggled in 1975, going 2-7 with a 4.46 ERA in 26 games, six of them starts. He then went 4-6 with a 5.09 ERA in 20 games, ten of them starts in 1976 with the Tigers.

On November 5, 1976, the Toronto Blue Jays selected Lemanczyk in the 1976 MLB Expansion Draft with the 43rd pick.

=== Toronto Blue Jays ===
Lemanczyk led the Blue Jays in victories in the 1977 season, as he had a 13-16 record with a 4.25 ERA in 34 starts. He pitched a team-high 252 innings, and had 11 complete games, second-best on the team.

He was named the Blue Jays opening day starter in 1978, but Lemanczyk lasted only 3 2/3 innings in a 6-2 loss to the Tigers. He struggled throughout the season, losing his first seven decisions, and finishing the season with a 4-14 record and a 6.26 ERA.

Lemanczyk rebounded in 1979, as on April 24, he pitched a one-hitter against the Texas Rangers as Toronto won the game 2-0. Lemanczyk went into the All-Star break with a 7-5 record with a 3.15 ERA and was named to the 1979 All-Star team; however, he did not appear in the game. Lemanczyk struggled in the latter half of the season, and suffered injury problems as he finished the season with a record of 8-10 with a 3.71 ERA.

He began the 1980 season with a 2-5 record with a 5.40 ERA in 10 games with Toronto, eight of them starts, which included starting the season opener; however, Lemanczyk was traded to the California Angels for future considerations on June 3. The Angels sent Ken Schrom to the Blue Jays on June 10 to complete the trade.

=== California Angels ===
Lemanczyk finished the 1980 season with the Angels, going 2-4 with a 4.32 ERA in 21 games, and was released by them on October 24. He then retired from the game, finishing his career with a 37-63 record with a 4.62 ERA in 185 games.

== Personal life ==
He is a 1973 graduate of Hartwick College and was inducted into its Athletics Hall of Fame in 1995. He is also a 2006 inductee of the Greater Syracuse Sports Hall of Fame.

He currently operates a baseball school for young athletes in Long Island, New York, first in the town of Franklin Square, and is now in Lynbrook.

He has been a full-time pitching coach at the New York Baseball Academy for 20 years.

His nickname when playing was 'Tarzan'.
