= Larry Anderson (baseball) =

American baseball player (born 1952)

- Pitcher
- Born: December 3, 1952 (age 72); Maywood, California
- Batted: Right Threw: Right

MLB debut
- September 25, 1974, for the Milwaukee Brewers

Last MLB appearance
- June 26, 1977, for the Chicago White Sox

MLB statistics
- Win–loss record: 2–3
- Earned run average: 5.66
- Strikeouts: 23
- Stats at Baseball Reference

Teams
- Milwaukee Brewers (1974–1975); Chicago White Sox (1977)

Lawrence Dennis Anderson (born December 3, 1952) is a former Major League Baseball pitcher. He played parts of three seasons for the Chicago White Sox and Milwaukee Brewers.

== Career ==
Larry was selected by the Milwaukee Brewers in the 2nd round (27th overall) of the 1971 MLB June Amateur Draft out of El Rancho High School in Pico Rivera, CA.
