= Tom Bruno =

American baseball player (born 1953)

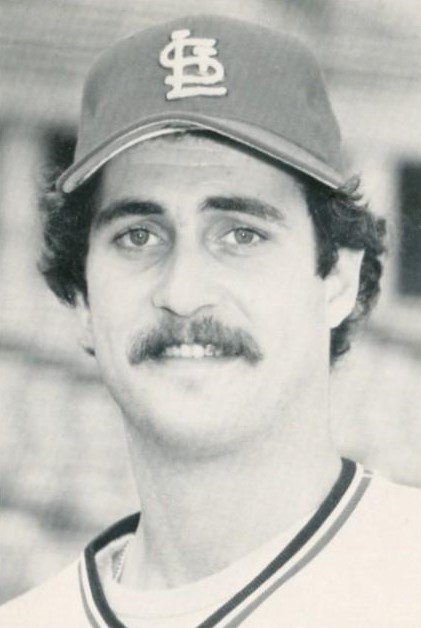
- Pitcher
- Born: January 26, 1953 (age 73); Chicago, Illinois, U.S.
- Batted: Right Threw: Right

MLB debut
- August 1, 1976, for the Kansas City Royals

Last MLB appearance
- September 26, 1979, for the St. Louis Cardinals

MLB statistics
- Win–loss record: 7–7
- Earned run average: 4.22
- Strikeouts: 107
- Stats at Baseball Reference

Teams
- Kansas City Royals (1976); Toronto Blue Jays (1977); St. Louis Cardinals (1978–1979)

Thomas Michael Bruno (born January 26, 1953) is an American former Major League Baseball pitcher. He batted right-handed and threw right-handed. He was born in Chicago, Illinois. He played parts of four seasons in the majors from 1976 until 1979 for the Kansas City Royals, Toronto Blue Jays, and St. Louis Cardinals. Primarily a relief pitcher, Bruno won seven games in his major league career. His best season came in 1978. Bruno compiled a 4–3 record, a 1.107 WHIP, and an impressive 1.99 ERA. On August 11, 1978, Bruno picked up the only save of his major league career. He pitched a flawless 12th inning, striking out the side, to nail down a 4–1 Cardinals victory over the Mets.

Bruno is currently a United States Coast Guard Master Captain and the owner of Major League Adventures, LLC, a hunting and fishing guide service and outfitter based in Pierre, South Dakota.
