= Paul Hartzell =

American baseball player (born 1953)

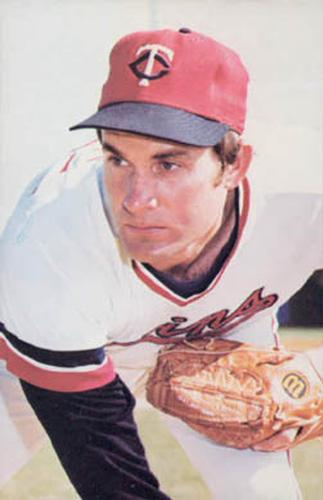
- Pitcher
- Born: November 2, 1953 (age 71); Bloomsburg, Pennsylvania, U.S.
- Batted: Right Threw: Right

MLB debut
- April 10, 1976, for the California Angels

Last MLB appearance
- September 24, 1984, for the Milwaukee Brewers

MLB statistics
- Win–loss record: 27–39
- Earned run average: 3.90
- Strikeouts: 237
- Stats at Baseball Reference

Teams
- California Angels (1976–1978); Minnesota Twins (1979); Baltimore Orioles (1980); Milwaukee Brewers (1984)
Medals
Men's baseball
Representing United States
Baseball World Cup
Gold medal – first place	1974 St. Petersburg	Team

Paul F. Hartzell (born November 2, 1953) is an American former professional baseball pitcher, who played in Major League Baseball (MLB) in all or part of six seasons, between 1976 and 1984. During that time, he pitched for the California Angels, Minnesota Twins, Baltimore Orioles, and Milwaukee Brewers of the American League (AL). Hartzell retired in July 1981, but returned to baseball in 1984, playing at each level of professional baseball in one season, culminating with his first MLB appearance since June 14, 1980, when he appeared in relief for the Brewers on September 15, 1984. He was known as a ground-ball pitcher.

== Baseball career ==
=== College ===
Hartzell was a two-sport varsity athlete, starring in baseball for the Lehigh University Engineers for three varsity seasons. In 1975, he posted one of the best seasons in Lehigh history for a pitcher, setting school records with 92 innings, 10 complete games, and a 1.66 earned run average (ERA). That mark is currently second in school history. Hartzell graduated Lehigh in 1975 with a B.S. in Mechanical Engineering and was inducted into the Roger S. Penske/Lehigh Athletics Hall of Fame in 1998.

=== Major leagues ===
Hartzell was selected in the 10th round of the 1975 amateur draft by the Angels. Signing soon after draft day, he pitched the 1975 season at the minor league A-level followed by the short-season Fall Instructional League.

In 1976, Hartzell made the Angels' MLB staff, out of spring training. Manager Dick Williams effectively used him as a starting pitcher and late-inning relief specialist. For the season, Hartzell pitched in 37 games, totalling 166 innings, while starting 15 games — of which, seven were complete games and two were shutouts. He pitched 22 games in relief, finishing 14 games, and earning two saves. For the season, Hartzell was 7-4 with an ERA of 2.77, which ranked seventh in the AL. He was also among the top five league leaders in fewest home runs and fewest walks allowed per nine innings, although he holds the Angels record for most hits allowed in a game on September 9, 1976, against the Kansas City Royals. Hartzell finished fourth-highest in the league in hit batsmen, with 10. The Angels finished the season with a record of 74-88, in fifth place in the AL Western Division.

In 1977, Hartzell's role on the pitching staff was similar to that of the prior season – a versatile arm used in the starter and late-inning relief roles. Appearing in 41 games, totalling 189 innings, he started 23 games, and had 6 complete games. As a reliever, Hartzell pitched in 18 games, finishing 12, and earned 4 saves. On Sunday June 26, 1977, Hartzell became one of the very few big league pitchers to be credited with two wins in one day, by beating the Texas Rangers in both ends of a doubleheader. For the season, he finished with a record of 8-12, with an ERA of 3.57, which was 11th-best in the AL. Hartzell's rate of 1.9 walks-per-nine innings was third-best. The Angels again ended the season with a record of 74-88, in fifth place in the AL West.

In 1978, Hartzell was primarily used in a relief role, appearing in 54 games, and finishing 28, with 6 saves. He completed 5 of his 12 games started. Hartzell's record was 6-10, with an ERA of 3.44, which led the Angels among pitchers with more than 100 innings. That year, the Angels challenged for the West Division title, finishing with a record of 87-75, five games behind the Royals.

On February 3, 1979, the Angels traded Hartzell, along with Dave Engle, Brad Havens, and Ken Landreaux, to the Twins for future-Hall of Famer, Rod Carew. During the 1979 season, he was used almost exclusively as a starting pitcher by the Twins. Hartzell started 26 times, with 4 complete games, and appeared in relief twice. Totaling 163 innings, his record was 6-10, with an ERA of 5.63. Hartzell was the only pitcher to beat the AL-Champion Orioles twice during the regular season and his 2.4 walks-per-nine innings was seventh best in the league. The Twins finished 82-80, good for fourth place in the West.

Beginning during the 1979 season and on through Spring training 1980, Hartzell was plagued with chronic arm injuries. He was released by the Twins in February, and pitched briefly with the Orioles, later that season.

After Hartzell was released by the O’s, he made several not-so-successful comeback attempts with Milwaukee, only pitching another 10.1 innings in MLB, thereafter, for the 1984 Brewers.
