= Doug Howard (baseball) =

American baseball player (born 1948)

- First baseman / Outfielder
- Born: February 6, 1948 (age 77); Salt Lake City, Utah, U.S.
- Batted: Right Threw: Right

MLB debut
- September 6, 1972, for the California Angels

Last MLB appearance
- June 19, 1976, for the Cleveland Indians

MLB statistics
- Batting average: .212
- Home runs: 1
- Runs batted in: 22

Teams
- California Angels (1972–1974); St. Louis Cardinals (1975); Cleveland Indians (1976)

Douglas Lynn Howard (born February 6, 1948) is an American former professional baseball player who played both infield and outfield positions.

Howard played college baseball for the BYU Cougars. He also played college basketball for the Cougars at guard; in fact, after completing play for BYU, Howard was also drafted by the NBA's Chicago Bulls in 1970, but he chose to play pro baseball.

Drafted by the California Angels in 1970, Howard made it to the big leagues in 1972, although Howard never enjoyed the kind of success in the majors that he achieved in the minors. From 1972 to 1976, Howard spent part of each season in Triple A, where he batted .301 in 500 games; in each of those five seasons, he was called up to the major leagues, but he only compiled a .212 average in 97 games at the major league level. Defensively, Howard was most often used at first base, though he also appeared at all three outfield positions and two games at third base.

In all, Howard played in parts of five major league seasons for the California Angels, St. Louis Cardinals, and Cleveland Indians of Major League Baseball. In November, 1976, Cleveland traded Howard to the newly created Toronto Blue Jays, but Howard was cut from the team's roster on March 29, about a week before the end of spring training, and was not offered a minor league position. Unable to find another organization interested in his services, Howard retired from professional baseball at age 29.
