= Bob Bailor =

American baseball player (born 1951)

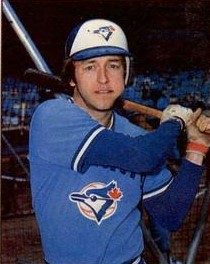
- Outfielder / Infielder
- Born: July 10, 1951 (age 75); Connellsville, Pennsylvania, U.S.
- Batted: Right Threw: Right

MLB debut
- September 6, 1975, for the Baltimore Orioles

Last MLB appearance
- October 6, 1985, for the Los Angeles Dodgers

MLB statistics
- Batting average: .264
- Home runs: 9
- Runs batted in: 222
- Stats at Baseball Reference

Teams
- Baltimore Orioles (1975–1976); Toronto Blue Jays (1977–1980); New York Mets (1981–1983); Los Angeles Dodgers (1984–1985)

Career highlights and awards
- 2× World Series champion (1992, 1993)

Robert Michael Bailor (born July 10, 1951) is an American former Major League Baseball player best known for being the first player selected by the Toronto Blue Jays in the 1976 Major League Baseball expansion draft.

== Early years ==
Bailor was born in Connellsville, Pennsylvania, the fifth of Robert and Agnes Bailor's six children. Robert Bailor Sr.'s family name was Bialkowski when they arrived in the United States from Poland. Robert Sr. was an engineer for the Chesapeake and Ohio Railway, hauling coal, iron ore and limestone, and Agnes was a stay-at-home mom.

In August 1963, Connellsville won the Pennsylvania state Little League title. Bailor attended Geibel Catholic High School but did not play high school ball, as neither Geibel nor Connellsville High School had a baseball team. Bailor did, however, play basketball in high school, and set the team record for most points in a game.

Bailor played baseball with the Connellsville American Legion team. Among his teammates were future Seattle Mariners pitcher Bob Galasso and first baseman Jim Braxton, who went on to have an eight-year career in the National Football League with the Buffalo Bills. It was through the American Legion that Bailor caught the eye of Baltimore Orioles scout Jocko Collins.

== Baltimore Orioles ==
Bailor signed with the Orioles upon graduation from Geibel Catholic in 1969. He was immediately a utility player, playing the outfield, second base, third base, shortstop and even pitching for one game in his first professional season with the Bluefield Orioles. In 1971 with the Aberdeen Pheasants, Bailor led the Class A Northern League with a .340 batting average. In 1972, he led the Class A California League with 63 stolen bases. Eventually, he began playing more and more shortstop by the time he debuted with the Baltimore Orioles in September 1975.

He started both games of a September 28 doubleheader with the New York Yankees, one at short and the other at second, and collected his first major league hit off Larry Gura in the second game. He returned to the triple A Rochester Red Wings in 1976, and again received a call up to the majors that September. In total, Bailor batted .288 with twelve home runs and 201 runs batted in over seven seasons in the Orioles' farm system. He was three-for-thirteen with no home runs or RBIs at the major league level.

== Toronto Blue Jays ==
The Toronto Blue Jays made Bailor the second overall pick in the 1976 Major League Baseball expansion draft. It is sometimes reported that he did not have an everyday position, and at the beginning of the year this was true—in April he was used at shortstop, left field and center field. However, Bailor was the team's regular shortstop from late April through mid-July, and then was moved to center field, becoming their everyday centerfielder until he was injured in late August. Bailor was out of action for a month, from August 22 to September 22; when he returned for the team's final nine games starting September 23, he was their regular left fielder.

In 1977, Bailor appeared in 122 games, and logged 523 plate appearances his rookie season in Toronto. He led the team in hits, (154) stolen bases (15), runs scored (62), and his .310 batting average set an expansion team record. He had ten assists from the outfield in just 537 innings, and was named to the Topps Rookie All-Star team at shortstop despite the fact that he only appeared in 53 games at short. On April 20, the New York Yankees' Sparky Lyle struck Bailor out for the first time in his major league career. Bailor had batted a record 51 times before striking out for the first time. Amongst players who had enough at-bats to qualify, for the 1977 season he finished fourth in the majors in at-bats per strikeout ratio.

In 1978 and 1979, Bailor emerged as the Jays' regular right fielder, though he still played many different positions. In 1978, he drove in a career high 52 runs while striking out only 21 times in 621 at-bats; this placed him first in the major leagues in at-bats per strikeout. He was named the Blue Jays Player of the Year for the first two years of the franchise's existence.

Bailor's production declined in 1979, as he batted only .229 with 1 home run and 38 RBI in 130 games, however, his fifteen assists from right field tied Dwight Evans for the most in the American League. In 1980, Bailor lost his job in right field to Lloyd Moseby, and was used as a fourth outfielder. He also appeared in three games as a relief pitcher, allowing two earned runs in 2.1 innings pitched. On December 12, the Blue Jays traded Bailor to the New York Mets for pitcher Roy Lee Jackson.

== New York Mets ==
Bailor spent a month on the disabled list with a rib cage injury, and was used sparingly his first season in New York, appearing in 51 games and logging just 81 at-bats. He went into Spring training 1982 competing for either of the two middle infield positions, and began the season competing with Wally Backman and Tom Veryzer for playing time at second base. With both Bailor and Backman batting over .300 at the end of May, Bailor began seeing more playing time at short and third base. He ended the season with 404 plate appearances, his most since 1979. He also stole a career-high 20 bases, and led the National League with an 87% stolen base percentage.

He began the 1983 season as the Mets' starting shortstop. For the season, he appeared in 118 games, his highest total since 1979. On December 8, Bailor and pitcher Carlos Diaz were shipped to the Dodgers for Sid Fernandez and Ross Jones.

== Los Angeles Dodgers ==
Bailor's first season in Los Angeles started late and ended early due to injuries. He dislocated his left shoulder during Spring training, causing him to miss the first month of the 1984 season. He then tore the cartilage in his right knee during batting practice on August 12 requiring arthroscopic surgery that pretty much ended his season. He ended the season hitting .275 with 0 HR and 8 RBI in just 65 games. In 1985, Bailor hit .246 with 0 HR and 7 RBI in 74 games with Los Angeles, helping the team reach the post-season. In the 1985 NLCS against the St. Louis Cardinals, Bailor got into two games, going hitless in one at-bat, as the Dodgers lost to the Cardinals. On April 2, 1986, the Dodgers released Bailor.

== Career stats ==
Games	PA	AB	Runs	Hits	2B	3B	HR	RBI	SB	BB	SO	Avg.	OBP	AB/SO	Fld%	IP	ERA
955	3206	2937	339	775	107	23	9	222	90	187	164	.264	.310	17.9	.974	1.2	7.71

Bailor's .310 batting average with the expansion Toronto Blue Jays broke Rusty Staub's record set in 1969 with the Montreal Expos (.302). The two were teammates on the New York Mets from 1981 to 1983. Bailor wore number 4 with the Mets, Staub's number during his first tenure with the club (1972–1975). Though he proved to be one of the great utility players of his era, Bailor never liked the term. "It sounds like a guy who changes light bulbs."

== Management and retirement ==
Shortly after his release from the Dodgers, Bailor was offered a player-coach position with Toronto's triple A affiliate, the Syracuse Chiefs. He turned the position down in order to spend time with his newborn child, Robert Michael Jr. A year later, he accepted a position with the organization managing the Florida State League's Dunedin Blue Jays. Bailor went on to manage Syracuse from 1988 to 1991, and was named International League Manager of the Year in 1989 as he led the Chiefs to a first-place finish. From 1992 until 1995, Bailor served as a coach with the Toronto Blue Jays. The entire Blue Jays coaching staff was let go after the 1995 season, and Bailor elected to retire from baseball.

Post-baseball, Bailor split his time between Connellsville and Palm Harbor, Florida, where he pursued his hobbies of fishing and hunting. He also worked as a hunting guide in Colorado in the off-seasons during his baseball career, and for a time afterwards.
