= Steve Hargan =

American baseball player (1942–2025)

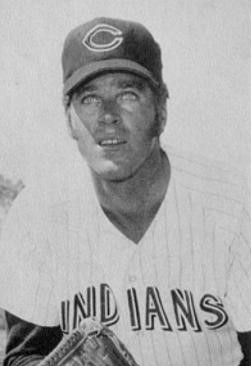
- Pitcher
- Born: September 8, 1942; Fort Wayne, Indiana, U.S.
- Died: October 30, 2025 (aged 83); Palm Springs, California, U.S.
- Batted: Right Threw: Right

MLB debut
- August 3, 1965, for the Cleveland Indians

Last MLB appearance
- September 15, 1977, for the Atlanta Braves

MLB statistics
- Win–loss record: 87–107
- Earned run average: 3.92
- Strikeouts: 891
- Stats at Baseball Reference

Teams
- Cleveland Indians (1965–1972); Texas Rangers (1974–1977); Toronto Blue Jays (1977); Atlanta Braves (1977)

Career highlights and awards
- All-Star (1967)

Steven Lowell Hargan (September 8, 1942 – October 30, 2025) was an American professional baseball player who pitched in Major League Baseball from 1965 to 1972 and 1974 to 1977.

The son of Lowell and Florence Hargan, he grew up in Fort Wayne, Indiana and excelled in basketball and football at South Side High School, from which he graduated in 1961. However, the school did not have an organized baseball team; he played on Pony League, Junior Federation and Connie Mack League teams and by the spring of 1961 he was being scouted by five Major League teams. He signed with the Cleveland Indians, who offered him a contract after he pitched with other prospects in a tryout at Cleveland Municipal Stadium.

On August 2, 1965, Hargan made his first major-league start, at home against the Detroit Tigers. He said his debut "was quite exciting. I remember I started against Mickey Lolich and he was already an established pitcher. I was trying too hard and throwing as hard as I could." He cruised through the first three innings and led 4–0, but then he gave up two runs in the fourth inning, and was lifted after giving up three runs in the fifth without retiring a batter. He received a no-decision as the Indians lost 12–7. In front of friends and family, he recorded his first major-league win, against the California Angels on August 25 at Dodger Stadium, in the Angels' last season there.

In 1967, he pitched shutouts in his first two starts in April. By midseason his 9–7 record with a 2.68 ERA and 10 complete games in 17 starts earned him a berth on his first and only Major League Baseball All-Star Game. He pulled a hamstring in his last start before the 1967 All-Star Game and did not pitch in the game. That year he led the American League in shutouts with six.

Injuries hampered him throughout his career, including arm problems, an ankle fracture and later carpal tunnel syndrome. He pitched for the Indians from 1965 to 1972, the Texas Rangers from 1974 to 1977, and the Toronto Blue Jays and Atlanta Braves in 1977.
