= 1978 Seattle Mariners season =

1978 Seattle Mariners
- League: American League
- Division: West
- Ballpark: Kingdome
- City: Seattle, Washington
- Record: 56–104 (.350)
- Divisional place: 7th
- Owners: Danny Kaye
- General manager: Lou Gorman
- Manager: Darrell Johnson
- Television: KING-TV 5
- Radio: KVI 570 AM (Dave Niehaus, Ken Wilson)

The 1978 Seattle Mariners season was the second in franchise history. The Mariners ended the season by finishing last in the American League West with a record of 56–104 (.350), their first last place finish and six games worse than their inaugural season.

== Offseason ==
- December 5, 1977: Received Leon Roberts in a trade with the Houston Astros for Jimmy Sexton.
- December 7: Received Mike Parrott in a trade with the Baltimore Orioles for Carlos López and Tommy Moore.
- December 9: Traded Dave Collins to the Cincinnati Reds for Shane Rawley.
- December 20: Bruce Bochte signed as a free agent.
- March 27, 1978: Bob Galasso, Mike Kekich, and Skip Jutze were released by the Mariners.

== Regular season ==
=== Season standings ===
AL West
Team	W	L	Pct.	GB	Home	Road
Kansas City Royals	92	70	.568	—	56‍–‍25	36‍–‍45
Texas Rangers	87	75	.537	5	52‍–‍30	35‍–‍45
California Angels	87	75	.537	5	50‍–‍31	37‍–‍44
Minnesota Twins	73	89	.451	19	38‍–‍43	35‍–‍46
Chicago White Sox	71	90	.441	20½	38‍–‍42	33‍–‍48
Oakland Athletics	69	93	.426	23	38‍–‍42	31‍–‍51
Seattle Mariners	56	104	.350	35	32‍–‍49	24‍–‍55

=== Record vs. opponents ===
1978 American League record Sources:
Team	BAL	BOS	CAL	CWS	CLE	DET	KC	MIL	MIN	NYY	OAK	SEA	TEX	TOR
Baltimore	—	7–8	4–6	8–1	9–6	7–8	2–8	7–8	5–5	6–9	11–0	9–1	7–4	8–7
Boston	8–7	—	9–2	7–3	7–8	12–3	4–6	10–5	9–2	7–9	5–5	7–3	3–7	11–4
California	6–4	2–9	—	8–7	6–4	4–7	9–6	5–5	12–3	5–5	9–6	9–6	5–10	7–3
Chicago	1–8	3–7	7–8	—	8–2	2–9	8–7	4–7	8–7	1–9	7–8	7–8	11–4	4–6
Cleveland	6–9	8–7	4–6	2–8	—	5–10	5–6	5–10	5–5	6–9	4–6	8–1	1–9	10–4
Detroit	8–7	3–12	7–4	9–2	10–5	—	4–6	7–8	4–6	4–11	6–4	8–2	7–3	9–6
Kansas City	8–2	6–4	6–9	7–8	6–5	6–4	—	6–4	7–8	6–5	10–5	12–3	7–8	5–5
Milwaukee	8–7	5–10	5–5	7–4	10–5	8–7	4–6	—	4–7	10–5	9–1	5–5	6–4	12–3
Minnesota	5–5	2–9	3–12	7–8	5–5	6–4	8–7	7–4	—	3–7	9–6	6–9	6–9	6–4
New York	9–6	9–7	5–5	9–1	9–6	11–4	5–6	5–10	7–3	—	8–2	6–5	6–4	11–4
Oakland	0–11	5–5	6–9	8–7	6–4	4–6	5–10	1–9	6–9	2–8	—	13–2	6–9	7–4
Seattle	1–9	3–7	6–9	8–7	1–8	2–8	3–12	5–5	9–6	5–6	2–13	—	3–12	8–2
Texas	4–7	7–3	10–5	4–11	9–1	3–7	8–7	4–6	9–6	4–6	9–6	12–3	—	4–7
Toronto	7–8	4–11	3–7	6–4	4–10	6–9	5–5	3–12	4–6	4–11	4–7	2–8	7–4	—

=== Season summary ===
- April 1, 1982: Newly acquired outfielder Leon Roberts hit a grand slam on Opening Day.
- July 11: Craig Reynolds, Seattle's representative in the All-Star Game, does not play in the game.
- October 1: Kevin Pasley hit a home run in the last at bat of his career.

==== Notable transactions ====
- May 31, 1978: Tom Paciorek signs as a free agent with Seattle.
- June 1: Steve Braun traded to the Kansas City Royals for Jim Colborn.
- June 6: 1978 MLB draft. Dave Valle selected in the second round. Vance McHenry selected in the 11th round.

== 1978 Roster ==
1978 Seattle Mariners
Roster
Pitchers: 17 Glenn Abbott; 42 Tom Brown; 39 Steve Burke; 48 Jim Colborn; 40 Rick Honeycutt; 29 Tom House; 46 Rick Jones; 30 Byron McLaughlin; 34 Paul Mitchell; 25 John Montague; 20 Mike Parrott; 13,45 Dick Pole; 41 Shane Rawley; 43 Enrique Romo; 27 Jim Todd	Catchers: 18 Kevin Pasley; 3 Bill Plummer; 15 Bob Stinson; Infielders: 14 José Báez; 11 Charlie Beamon; 26 Juan Bernhardt; 2 Julio Cruz; 7 Dan Meyer; 10 Larry Milbourne; 12 Craig Reynolds; 6 Bob Robertson; 1 Bill Stein	Outfielders: 23 Bruce Bochte; 4 Steve Braun; 44 John Hale; 9 Ruppert Jones; 14 Tom Paciorek; 8 Leon Roberts; 36 Leroy Stanton	Manager: 22 Darrell Johnson; Coaches: 31 Don Bryant (Bullpen); 33 Jim Busby (Third base); 28 Vada Pinson (First base/Hitting); 32 Wes Stock (Pitching)

=== Player stats ===
==== Batting ====
===== Starters by position =====
Note: Pos = Position; G = Games played; AB = At bats; H = Hits; Avg. = Batting average; HR = Home runs; RBI = Runs batted in

Pos	Player	G	AB	H	Avg.	HR	RBI
C	Bob Stinson	124	364	94	.258	11	55
1B	Dan Meyer	123	444	101	.227	8	56
2B	Julio Cruz	147	550	129	.235	1	25
SS	Craig Reynolds	148	548	160	.292	5	44
3B	Bill Stein	114	403	105	.261	4	37
LF	Bruce Bochte	140	486	128	.263	11	51
CF	Ruppert Jones	129	472	111	.235	6	46
RF	Leon Roberts	134	472	142	.301	22	92
DH	Leroy Stanton	93	302	55	.182	3	24

==== Other batters ====
Note: G = Games played; AB = At bats; H = Hits; Avg. = Batting average; HR = Home runs; RBI = Runs batted in

Player	G	AB	H	Avg.	HR	RBI
Tom Paciorek	70	251	75	.299	4	30
Larry Milbourne	93	234	53	.254	2	20
John Hale	107	211	36	.171	4	22
Bob Robertson	64	174	40	.230	8	28
Juan Bernhardt	54	165	38	.230	2	12
Bill Plummer	41	93	20	.215	2	7
Steve Braun	32	74	17	.230	3	15
Kevin Pasley	25	54	13	.241	1	5
José Báez	23	50	8	.160	0	2
Charlie Beamon	10	11	2	.182	0	0

==== Pitching ====
===== Starting pitchers =====
Note: G = Games pitched; IP = Innings pitched; W = Wins; L = Losses; ERA = Earned run average; SO = Strikeouts

Player	G	IP	W	L	ERA	SO
Paul Mitchell	29	168.0	8	14	4.18	75
Glenn Abbott	29	155.1	7	15	5.27	67
Rick Honeycutt	26	134.1	5	11	4.89	50
Jim Colborn	20	114.1	3	10	5.35	26
Byron McLaughlin	20	107.0	4	8	4.37	87
Dick Pole	21	98.2	4	11	6.48	41

==== Other pitchers ====
Note: G = Games pitched; IP = Innings pitched; W = Wins; L = Losses; ERA = Earned run average; SO = Strikeouts

Player	G	IP	W	L	ERA	SO
Rick Jones	3	12.1	0	2	5.84	11

===== Relief pitchers =====
Note: G = Games pitched; W = Wins; L = Losses; SV = Saves; ERA = Earned run average; SO = Strikeouts

Player	G	W	L	SV	ERA	SO
Enrique Romo	56	11	7	10	3.69	62
Shane Rawley	52	4	9	4	4.12	66
Jim Todd	49	3	4	3	3.88	37
Tom House	34	5	4	0	4.66	29
Mike Parrott	27	1	5	1	5.14	41
John Montague	19	1	3	2	3.88	37
Steve Burke	18	0	1	0	3.49	16
Tom Brown	6	0	0	0	4.15	8

== Farm system ==
Level	Team	League	Manager
AAA	San Jose Missions	Pacific Coast League	Rene Lachemann
A	Stockton Mariners	California League	Bobby Floyd
A-Short Season	Bellingham Mariners	Northwest League	Bob Didier

After fielding only one minor league affiliate in 1977, the Mariners added a Triple-A and Single-A team in 1978.
