= 1977 Seattle Mariners season =

1977 Seattle Mariners
- League: American League
- Division: West
- Ballpark: Kingdome
- City: Seattle, Washington
- Record: 64–98 (.395)
- Divisional place: 6th
- Owners: Danny Kaye
- General managers: Dick Vertlieb/Lou Gorman
- Managers: Darrell Johnson
- Television: KING-TV 5 (NBC)
- Radio: KVI 570 AM (Dave Niehaus, Ken Wilson)

The 1977 Seattle Mariners season was the first season in franchise history, which was established via the 1977 Major League Baseball expansion. The city had been without a major league team since the Seattle Pilots left for Milwaukee to become the Brewers in April 1970.

The Mariners ended the 1977 season by narrowly avoiding last place (held by the Oakland Athletics), finishing sixth in the American League West with a record of 64–98 (.395), 38 games behind the AL West champion Kansas City Royals.

== Venue ==
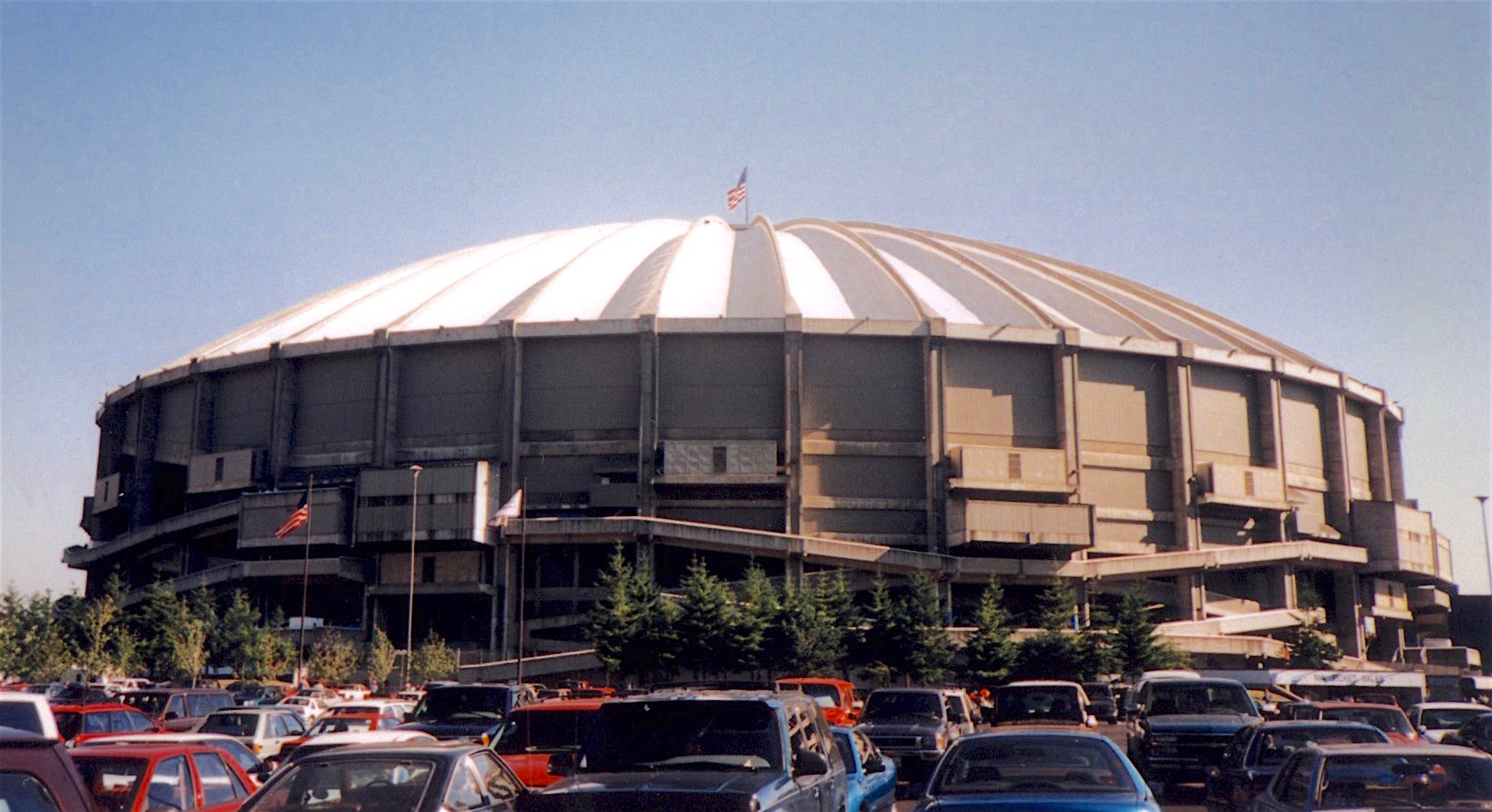
The Kingdome, 1996

In 1969, the Seattle Pilots played a single season in Seattle at Sick's Stadium before abruptly moving to Milwaukee to become the Brewers. The team had been received poorly, partly due to its shoddy stadium and ownership. In order to meet the major league stadium standards that the league demanded, the city began the search for land to build a replacement for Sick's Stadium, but the Pilots went bankrupt in the process. The state of Washington began suing the American League for unfairly enabling the sale of the Pilots despite working to meet their demands.

Sick's Stadium's multipurpose replacement, the Kingdome, opened in 1976 in Seattle's Chinatown-International District, a Pan-Asian enclave neighboring Seattle's downtown. Its construction in the CID was met with protest to preserve the historic neighborhood.

Seattle set the record for season opener game attendance at the Kingdome on April 6, 1977.

== Offseason ==
=== Broadcasting team ===
Danny Kaye, a major investor partner in the Mariners, recruited play-by-play announcer Dave Niehaus for the Mariners' inaugural season because of his time with the California Angels. He was popular in Seattle throughout his tenure, which lasted until his death in 2010.

=== On-field team ===
- September 3, 1976: Former Red Sox manager Darrell Johnson is hired to be the team's first manager. Lou Gorman, Seattle's director of baseball operations, states that Johnson will help in scouting players for the upcoming expansion draft.
- October 1, 1976: Dave Johnson was purchased by the Mariners from the Baltimore Orioles.
- October 22, 1976: Diego Seguí was purchased by the Mariners from the San Diego Padres.
- November 5, 1976: The 1976 Major League Baseball expansion draft was held. The Mariners (along with their expansion partners, the Toronto Blue Jays) selected 30 players to fill their major league roster.
- April 1, 1977: Mike Kekich was purchased by the Mariners from the Tecolotes de Nuevo Laredo.

== Regular season ==
=== The first game ===
==== Ceremonial pitch ====
The first ceremonial pitch was thrown by Washington state Senator Henry Jackson alongside MLB commissioner Bowie Kuhn and team owner Danny Kaye.

==== Linescore ====
April 6, Kingdome, Seattle, Washington

Team	1	2	3	4	5	6	7	8	9	R	H	E
California	1	1	2	2	1	0	0	0	0	7	9	1
Seattle	0	0	0	0	0	0	0	0	0	0	9	2
W: Frank Tanana (1–0) L: Diego Seguí (0–1)
HRs: Joe Rudi (1)

==== Boxscore ====
===== Batting =====
California Angels	AB	R	H	RBI	Seattle Mariners	AB	R	H	RBI
Remy, 2b	3	1	0	0	Collins, DH	4	0	0	0
Grich, ss	4	0	0	0	Báez, 2B	4	0	2	0
Bonds, rf	5	1	0	0	Braun, LF	3	0	1	0
Baylor, dh	3	1	1	1	Stanton, RF	4	0	1	0
Rudi, lf	5	1	3	4	Stein, 3B	4	0	2	0
Solaita, 1b	5	0	1	0	Meyer, 1B	4	0	0	0
Bochte, cf	3	2	2	0	Jones, CF	4	0	0	0
Chalk, 3b	5	0	1	0	Stinson, C	3	0	1	0
Humphrey, c	4	1	1	2	Reynolds, SS	4	0	2	0
Totals	37	7	9	7	Totals	34	0	9	0

===== Pitching =====
California Angels	IP	H	R	ER	BB	SO	Seattle Mariners	IP	H	R	ER	BB	SO
Tanana, W, (1–0)	9.0	9	0	0	2	9	Seguí, L, (0–1)	3.2	5	6	4	3	3
							Montague	5.1	4	1	1	3	3
Totals	9.0	9	0	0	2	9	Totals	9.0	9	7	5	6	6

=== Other notable events ===
- April 10, 1977: Designated hitter Juan Bernhardt hit the first home run in team history.
- April 13, 1977: The first extra innings game in team history resulted in a 3–2 win over the Minnesota Twins.
- May 19, 1977: The first shutout win in team history was a 3–0 victory over the Oakland Athletics.
- July 1, 1977: The Milwaukee Brewers played their first game in Seattle since 1969, when they were the Seattle Pilots. The Brewers beat the hometown Mariners, 2–1.
- July 8, 1977: Scored the most runs of the season in a 13–11 win against the Minnesota Twins.

=== Season standings ===
AL West
Team	W	L	Pct.	GB	Home	Road
Kansas City Royals	102	60	.630	—	55‍–‍26	47‍–‍34
Texas Rangers	94	68	.580	8	44‍–‍37	50‍–‍31
Chicago White Sox	90	72	.556	12	48‍–‍33	42‍–‍39
Minnesota Twins	84	77	.522	17½	48‍–‍32	36‍–‍45
California Angels	74	88	.457	28	39‍–‍42	35‍–‍46
Seattle Mariners	64	98	.395	38	29‍–‍52	35‍–‍46
Oakland Athletics	63	98	.391	38½	35‍–‍46	28‍–‍52

=== Record vs. opponents ===
1977 American League record Sources:
Team	BAL	BOS	CAL	CWS	CLE	DET	KC	MIL	MIN	NYY	OAK	SEA	TEX	TOR
Baltimore	—	6–8	5–6	5–5	11–4	12–3	4–7	11–4	6–4	8–7	8–2	7–3	4–6	10–5
Boston	8–6	—	7–3	3–7	8–7	9–6	5–5	9–6	4–6	8–7	8–3	10–1	6–4	12–3
California	6–5	3–7	—	8–7	6–4	4–6	6–9	5–5	7–8	4–7	5–10	9–6	5–10	6–4
Chicago	5–5	7–3	7–8	—	6–4	4–6	8–7	6–5	10–5	3–7	10–5	10–5	6–9	8–3
Cleveland	4–11	7–8	4–6	4–6	—	8–7	3–7	11–4	2–9	3–12	7–3	7–3	2–9	9–5
Detroit	3–12	6–9	6–4	6–4	7–8	—	3–8	10–5	5–5	6–9	5–5	5–6	2–8	10–5
Kansas City	7–4	5–5	9–6	7–8	7–3	8–3	—	8–2	10–5	5–5	9–6	11–4	8–7	8–2
Milwaukee	4–11	6–9	5–5	5–6	4–11	5–10	2–8	—	3–8	8–7	5–5	7–3	5–5	8–7
Minnesota	4–6	6–4	8–7	5–10	9–2	5–5	5–10	8–3	—	2–8	8–6	7–8	8–7	9–1
New York	7–8	7–8	7–4	7–3	12–3	9–6	5–5	7–8	8–2	—	9–2	6–4	7–3	9–6
Oakland	2–8	3–8	10–5	5–10	3–7	5–5	6–9	5–5	6–8	2–9	—	7–8	2–13	7–3
Seattle	3–7	1–10	6–9	5–10	3–7	6–5	4–11	3–7	8–7	4–6	8–7	—	9–6	4–6
Texas	6–4	4–6	10–5	9–6	9–2	8–2	7–8	5–5	7–8	3–7	13–2	6–9	—	7–4
Toronto	5–10	3–12	4–6	3–8	5–9	5–10	2–8	7–8	1–9	6–9	3–7	6–4	4–7	—

=== Notable transactions ===
- April 20, 1977: Pete Broberg was traded by the Mariners to the Chicago Cubs for a player to be named later. The Cubs completed the deal by sending Jim Todd to the Mariners on October 25.
- May 2, 1977: Dave Johnson was purchased from the Mariners by the Minnesota Twins.
- June 7, 1977: Tony Phillips was drafted by the Mariners in the 16th round of the 1977 Major League Baseball draft, but did not sign.
- July 27, 1977: Dave Pagan was traded by the Mariners to the Pittsburgh Pirates for a player to be named later. The Pirates completed the deal by sending Rick Honeycutt to the Mariners on August 22.
- August 2, 1977: Stan Thomas was traded by the Mariners to the New York Yankees for future considerations.
- September 9, 1977: Bill Laxton and cash were traded by the Mariners to the Cleveland Indians for Ray Fosse.

=== Roster ===
1977 Seattle Mariners
Roster
Pitchers: 17 Glenn Abbott; 39 Steve Burke; 35 Greg Erardi; 19 Bob Galasso; 40 Rick Honeycutt; 29 Tom House; 46 Rick Jones; 37 Mike Kekich; 38 Bill Laxton; 24 Frank MacCormack; 30 Byron McLaughlin; 41 Doc Medich; 34 Paul Mitchell; 25 John Montague; 20 Tommy Moore; 30 Dave Pagan; 45 Dick Pole; 43 Enrique Romo; 27 Diego Seguí; 23 Stan Thomas; 16 Gary Wheelock	Catchers: 6 Larry Cox; 38 Ray Fosse; 3 Skip Jutze; 18 Kevin Pasley; 15 Bob Stinson; Infielders: 14 José Báez; 26 Juan Bernhardt; 2 Julio Cruz; 18 Joe Lis; 21 Tom McMillan; 7 Dan Meyer; 10 Larry Milbourne; 12 Craig Reynolds; 20 Jimmy Sexton; 1 Bill Stein	Outfielders: 4 Steve Braun; 5 Dave Collins; 23 Puchy Delgado; 9 Ruppert Jones; 8 Carlos López; 11 Tommy Smith; 36 Leroy Stanton	Manager: 22 Darrell Johnson; Coaches: 31 Don Bryant (Bullpen); 33 Jim Busby (Third Base); 28 Vada Pinson (First Base/Hitting); 32 Wes Stock (Pitching)

== Game log ==
=== Regular season ===
Legend
	Mariners win
	Mariners loss
	Postponement
	Eliminated from playoff race
**Bold**	Mariners team member

1977 regular season game log: 64–98 (Home: 29–52; Away: 35–46)
April

#	Date	Time (PT)	Opponent	Score	Win	Loss	Save	Time of Game	Attendance	Record	Box/ Streak
1	April 6		California Angels	0–7	Tanana (1–0)	Segui (0–1)			57,762	0–1	L1
2	April 7		California Angels	0–2	Ryan (1–0)	Romo (0–1)			10,144	0–2	L2
3	April 8		California Angels	7–6	Laxton (1–0)	Verhoeven (0–1)			11,845	1–2	W1
4	April 9		California Angels	5–1	Wheelock (1–0)	Simpson (0–1)	Montague (1)		27,668	2–2	W2
5	April 10		California Angels	5–12	Tanana (2–0)	Abbott (0–1)			10,405	2–3	L1
6	April 11		Minnesota Twins	3–12	Zahn (1–0)	Segui (0–2)			8,979	2–4	L2
7	April 12		Minnesota Twins	2–3	Schueler (1–1)	Laxton (1–1)	Burgmeier (2)		8,589	2–5	L3
8	April 13		Minnesota Twins	3–2	Moore (1–0)	Burgmeier (0–1)			11,635	3–5	W1
9	April 14		Minnesota Twins	4–3	Wheelock (2–0)	Redfern (0–2)	Montague (2)		9,167	4–5	W2
10	April 15		@ California Angels	0–7	Ryan (2–1)	Abbott (0–2)			34,654	4–6	L1
11	April 16		@ California Angels	4–6	Hartzell (1–0)	Montague (0–1)	Kirkwood (1)		19,690	4–7	L2
12	April 17		@ California Angels	11–7	Kekich (1–0)	Monge (0–1)	Pagan (1)		13,813	5–7	W1
13	April 18		Texas Rangers	8–6	Thomas (1–0)	Alexander (1–1)	Laxton (1)		9,535	6–7	W2
14	April 19		Texas Rangers	1–3	Lindblad (1–0)	Wheelock (2–1)			10,947	6–8	L1
15	April 20		Texas Rangers	2–5	Briles (1–0)	Montague (0–2)	Devine (1)		10,763	6–9	L2
16	April 22		Royals	5–6	Littell (2–1)	Pagan (0–1)	Gura (2)		19,756	6–10	L3
17	April 23		Royals	6–8	Leonard (1–0)	Segui (0–3)	Gura (3)		22,685	6–11	L4
18	April 24		Royals	1–16	Colborn (3–1)	Wheelock (2–2)	—		—	6–12	L5
19	April 24		Royals	4–2	Montague (1–2)	Splittorff (1–1)	—		21,734	7–12	W1
20	April 26		@ Minnesota Twins	3–5	Burgmeier (2–1)	Thomas (1–1)	Johnson (2)		3,422	7–13	L1
21	April 27		@ Minnesota Twins	3–5	Johnson (3–0)	Moore (1–1)	Burgmeier (3)		3,170	7–14	L2
22	April 28		@ Minnesota Twins	4–3	Montague (2–2)	Goltz (0–2)			3,766	8–14	W1
23	April 29		@ New York Yankees	0–3	Guidry (2–0)	Thomas (1–2)	Lyle (5)		15,284	8–15	L1
24	April 30		@ New York Yankees	2–7	Figueroa (2–2)	Wheelock (2–3)			19,525	8–16	L2

May

#	Date	Time (PT)	Opponent	Score	Win	Loss	Save	Time of Game	Attendance	Record	Box/ Streak
25	May 1		@ New York Yankees	2–5	Holtzman (2–1)	Abbott (0–3)	Lyle (6)		20,477	8–17	L3
26	May 3		@ Boston Red Sox	10–8	Montague (3–2)	Wise (1–2)	Pagan (2)		12,422	9–17	W1
27	May 4		@ Boston Red Sox	2–5	Cleveland (2–2)	Thomas (1–3)	Campbell (3)		11,408	9–18	L1
28	May 5		@ Boston Red Sox	2–5	Jenkins (4–1)	Segui (0–4)			10,358	9–19	L2
29	May 6		@ Baltimore Orioles	1–4	Grimsley (3–1)	Abbott (0–4)			4,402	9–20	L3
30	May 7		@ Baltimore Orioles	2–4	May (3–3)	Jones (0–1)	Flanagan (1)		16,212	9–21	L4
31	May 8		@ Baltimore Orioles	4–6	Palmer (5–1)	Pole (0–1)	McGregor (1)		9,638	9–22	L5
32	May 9		@ Toronto Blue Jays	4–10	Singer (2–4)	Thomas (1–4)			11,680	9–23	L6
33	May 10		@ Toronto Blue Jays	3–9	Garvin (5–0)	Montague (3–3)			13,017	9–24	L7
34	May 11		New York Yankees	5–2	Laxton (2–1)	Holtzman (2–2)	Romo (1)		23,978	10–24	W1
35	May 12		New York Yankees	8–6	Moore (2–1)	Hunter (1–2)			42,132	11–24	W2
36	May 13		Boston Red Sox	5–7	Willoughby (3–0)	Romo (0–2)	Campbell (4)		20,523	11–25	L1
37	May 14		Boston Red Sox	4–8	Stanley (3–0)	Thomas (1–5)	Campbell (5)		52,485	11–26	L2
38	May 15		Boston Red Sox	4–5	Lee (1–0)	Jones (0–2)	Campbell (6)		47,353	11–27	L3
39	May 16		Baltimore Orioles	8–3	Abbott (1–4)	Palmer (5–3)	Kekich (1)		10,388	12–27	W1
40	May 17		Baltimore Orioles	10–2	Romo (1–2)	May (4–4)			10,920	13–27	W2
41	May 19		@ Oakland Athletics	3–0	Pagan (1–1)	Langford (3–3)			2,179	14–27	W3
42	May 20		@ Oakland Athletics	5–14	Medich (3–2)	Jones (0–3)			2,660	14–28	L1
43	May 21		@ Oakland Athletics	7–6	Kekich (2–0)	Lacey (1–1)			3,230	15–28	W1
44	May 22		@ Oakland Athletics	6–2	Pole (1–1)	Blue (3–4)	Romo (2)		3,138	16–28	W2
45	May 24		@ Cleveland Indians	5–7	Waits (2–0)	Romo (1–3)	Kern (4)		5,576	16–29	L1
46	May 25		@ Cleveland Indians	1–2	Eckersley (4–3)	Laxton (2–2)			4,516	16–30	L2
47	May 27		@ Detroit Tigers	2–1	Abbott (2–4)	Fidrych (0–1)	Kekich (2)		44,207	17–30	W1
48	May 28		@ Detroit Tigers	3–1	Pole (2–1)	Rozema (4–2)	Laxton (2)		15,820	18–30	W2
49	May 29		@ Detroit Tigers	6–4	Thomas (2–5)	Foucault (3–2)			11,778	19–30	W3
50	May 30		@ Texas Rangers	7–4	Romo (2–3)	Blyleven (4–6)	Laxton (3)		DH	20–30	W4
51	May 30		@ Texas Rangers	9–3	Montague (4–3)	Perry (4–5)	Segui (1)		17,844	21–30	W5

June

#	Date	Time (PT)	Opponent	Score	Win	Loss	Save	Time of Game	Attendance	Record	Box/ Streak
52	June 1		Oakland Athletics	3–6	Medich (5–2)	Abbott (2–5)	Coleman (2)		14,350	21–31	L1
53	June 2		Oakland Athletics	0–1	Norris (2–1)	Pole (2–2)			10,712	21–32	L2
54	June 3		Cleveland Indians	1–7	Eckersley (6–3)	Jones (0–4)	Kern (5)		19,438	21–33	L3
55	June 4		Cleveland Indians	5–7	Waits (3–0)	Kekich (2–1)	Monge (3)		24,074	21–34	L4
56	June 5		Cleveland Indians	6–1	Montague (5–3)	Bibby (4–3)			14,167	22–34	W1
57	June 7		Detroit Tigers	2–5	Rozema (6–2)	Abbott (2–6)	Foucault (5)		10,050	22–35	L1
58	June 8		Detroit Tigers	3–2	Kekich (3–1)	Hiller (3–6)			11,211	23–35	W1
59	June 9		Detroit Tigers	2–1	Romo (3–3)	Sykes (0–2)			10,840	24–35	W2
60	June 10		Toronto Blue Jays	3–4	Lemanczyk (4–5)	Montague (5–4)	Willis (4)		11,786	24–36	L1
61	June 11		Toronto Blue Jays	4–5	Johnson (2–2)	Romo (3–4)			21,318	24–37	L2
62	June 12		Toronto Blue Jays	5–2	Pole (3–2)	Vuckovich (2–5)			28,412	25–37	W1
63	June 14		Oakland Athletics	3–6	Torrealba (3–0)	House (1–1)	Lacey (3)		13,764	25–38	L1
64	June 15		Oakland Athletics	6–5	Kekich (4–1)	Torrealba (3–1)			14,248	26–38	W1
65	June 16		Oakland Athletics	3–1	Abbott (3–6)	Langford (4–5)			11,097	27–38	W2
66	June 17		@ Texas Rangers	2–1	Pole (4–2)	Marshall (2–1)	House (1)		DH	28–38	W3
67	June 17		@ Texas Rangers	6–8	Briles (3–3)	Wheelock (2–4)	Devine (3)		21,577	28–39	L1
68	June 18		@ Texas Rangers	6–1	Jones (1–4)	Blyleven (6–8)			17,352	29–39	W1
69	June 19		@ Texas Rangers	2–1	Romo (4–4)	Perry (6–6)			12,465	30–39	W2
70	June 20		@ Royals	4–2	Wheelock (3–4)	Leonard (4–8)	Romo (3)		21,475	31–39	W3
71	June 21		@ Royals	3–13	Colborn (8–7)	Abbott (3–7)	—		10,958	31–40	L1
72	June 22		@ Royals	3–4	Bird (3–1)	Pole (4–3)	Littell (8)		22,140	31–41	L2
73	June 23		@ Royals	8–6	Romo (5–4)	Littell (5–3)	—		13,520	32–41	W1
74	June 24		@ Milwaukee Brewers	1–7	Sorensen (1–1)	Montague (5–5)			11,625	32–42	L1
75	June 25		@ Milwaukee Brewers	8–3	Wheelock (4–4)	Haas (4–5)	Romo (4)		19,572	33–42	W1
76	June 26		@ Milwaukee Brewers	6–8	Caldwell (1–0)	Romo (5–5)			19,699	33–43	L1
77	June 27		@ Chicago White Sox	4–10	Kravec (3–2)	Pole (4–4)	Johnson (1)		16,026	33–44	L2
78	June 28		@ Chicago White Sox	4–10	Barrios (7–3)	Montague (5–6)			8,365	33–45	L3
79	June 29		@ Chicago White Sox	3–1	House (2–1)	Wood (1–2)	Romo (5)		15,415	34–45	W1

July

#	Date	Time (PT)	Opponent	Score	Win	Loss	Save	Time of Game	Attendance	Record	Box/ Streak
80	July 1		Milwaukee Brewers	1–2	Haas (5–5)	Wheelock (4–5)			16,119	34–46	L1
81	July 2		Milwaukee Brewers	2–1	Abbott (4–7)	Slaton (6–7)	Kekich (3)		24,466	35–46	W1
82	July 3		Milwaukee Brewers	3–10	Augustine (9–9)	Pole (4–5)			16,226	35–47	L1
83	July 4		Chicago White Sox	2–6	Barrios (8–3)	Montague (5–7)			10,897	35–48	L2
84	July 5		Chicago White Sox	1–4	Stone (9–6)	House (2–2)	LaGrow (13)		14,032	35–49	L3
85	July 6		Chicago White Sox	2–4	Wood (3–2)	Wheelock (4–6)			21,526	35–50	L4
86	July 8		@ Minnesota Twins	13–11	Laxton (3–2)	Thormodsgard (6–5)	Romo (6)		11,966	36–50	W1
87	July 9		@ Minnesota Twins	5–2	Pole (5–5)	Goltz (9–6)	Romo (7)		23,401	37–50	W2
88	July 10		@ Minnesota Twins	0–15	Zahn (7–7)	Thomas (2–6)			34,213	37–51	L1
89	July 11		@ Oakland Athletics	1–8	Coleman (1–0)	House (2–3)	Lacey (5)		8,760	37–52	L2
90	July 12		@ Oakland Athletics	2–3	Blue (7–11)	Romo (5–6)			5,299	37–53	L3
91	July 13		@ Oakland Athletics	3–1	Abbott (5–7)	Langford (7–8)			4,529	38–53	W1
92	July 14		@ California Angels	4–1	Pole (6–5)	Brett (6–8)	Romo (8)	11,400	39–53	W2	
93	July 15		@ California Angels	6–2	House (3–3)	Nolan (4–3)			11,383	40–53	W3
94	July 16		@ California Angels	4–5	Ryan (13–8)	Romo (5–7)			29,068	40–54	L1
95	July 17		@ California Angels	8–7	Kekich (5–1)	LaRoche (6–3)			10,879	41–54	W1
—	July 19	5:30 p.m. PDT	48th All-Star Game	National League vs. American League (Yankee Stadium, Bronx, New York)							
96	July 21		Oakland Athletics	4–3	Abbott (6–7)	Langford (7–10)	Romo (9)		17,382	42–54	W2
97	July 22		Oakland Athletics	3–5	Blue (9–11)	Pole (6–6)	Lacey (6)		13,960	42–55	L1
98	July 23		Oakland Athletics	10–3	Wheelock (5–6)	Norris (2–7)			12,216	43–55	W1
99	July 24		California Angels	1–3	Hartzell (4–6)	House (3–4)	Miller (3)		DH	43–56	L1
100	July 24		California Angels	3–4	Simpson (5–7)	Galasso (0–1)	LaRoche (10)		25,344	43–57	L2
101	July 25		California Angels	2–7	Ryan (14–9)	Pole (6–7)			10,886	43–58	L3
102	July 26		Minnesota Twins	9–7	Abbott (7–7)	Thormodsgard (7–8)	Segui (2)		12,017	44–58	W1
103	July 27		Minnesota Twins	1–4	Redfern (4–5)	House (3–5)			16,869	44–59	L1
104	July 28		Minnesota Twins	5–2	Wheelock (6–6)	Zahn (9–8)	Montague (3)	11,759	45–59	W1	
105	July 29		Baltimore Orioles	4–5	Drago (4–3)	Kekich (5–2)			14,313	45–60	L1
106	July 30		Baltimore Orioles	3–5	Martinez (9–6)	Montague (5–8)			31,609	45–61	L2
107	July 31		Baltimore Orioles	6–1	Abbott (8–7)	Palmer (12–9)			11,464	46–61	W1

August

#	Date	Time (PT)	Opponent	Score	Win	Loss	Save	Time of Game	Attendance	Record	Box/ Streak
108	August 2		Boston Red Sox	2–3	Campbell (11–7)	Montague (5–9)			24,344	46–62	L1
109	August 3		Boston Red Sox	12–4	Paxton (5–2)	Wheelock (6–7)			21,152	46–63	L2
110	August 5		New York Yankees	5–3	Pole (7–7)	Figueroa (10–8)	Romo (10)		36,833	47–63	W1
111	August 6		New York Yankees	9–2	Abbott (9–7)	Hunter (6–7)			42,146	48–63	W2
112	August 7		New York Yankees	1–7	Torrez (11–10)	Montague (5–10)			29,412	48–64	L1
113	August 8		@ Chicago White Sox	4–5	Wiles (1–0)	Romo (5–8)			17,047	48–65	L2
114	August 9		@ Chicago White Sox	3–13	Stone (12–7)	Wheelock (6–8)			12,294	48–66	L3
115	August 10		@ Baltimore Orioles	4–5	May (13–10)	Pole (7–8)	Drago (5)		7,579	48–67	L4
116	August 11		@ Baltimore Orioles	3–4	Drago (5–3)	Romo (5–9)			7,893	48–68	L5
117	August 12		@ Boston Red Sox	2–7	Wise (9–4)	Mitchell (0–4)			27,005	48–69	L6
118	August 13		@ Boston Red Sox	6–13	Jenkins (9–7)	Galasso (0–2)			34,095	48–70	L7
119	August 14		@ Boston Red Sox	1–11	Paxton (6–2)	Wheelock (6–9)			31,223	48–71	L8
120	August 15		@ Detroit Tigers	1–13	Sykes (3–4)	Pole (7–9)			14,414	48–72	L9
121	August 16		@ Detroit Tigers	3–2	Abbott (10–7)	Morris (1–1)			9,065	49–72	W1
122	August 17		@ Minnesota Twins	3–2	Mitchell (1–4)	Zahn (11–10)	Romo (11)		11,739	50–72	W2
123	August 18		@ Minnesota Twins	2–8	Thormodsgard (10–9)	Galasso (0–3)			13,884	50–73	L1
124	August 19		Detroit Tigers	4–6	Rozema (14–4)	Pole (7–10)	Taylor (1)		19,698	50–74	L2
125	August 20		Detroit Tigers	3–7	Wilcox (5–0)	Abbott (10–8)			55,670	50–75	L3
126	August 21		Detroit Tigers	4–5	Crawford (5–5)	Mitchell (1–5)	Hiller (6)		15,373	50–76	L4
127	August 22		Cleveland Indians	1–12	Bibby (10–10)	Galasso (0–4)			DH	50–77	L5
128	August 22		Cleveland Indians	4–3	Montague (6–10)	Garland (10–15)			12,347	51–77	W1
129	August 24		Toronto Blue Jays	0–7	Garvin (9–13)	Pole (7–11)			DH	51–78	L1
130	August 24		Toronto Blue Jays	3–9	Jefferson (8–13)	Abbott (10–9)			13,253	51–79	L2
131	August 26		@ Cleveland Indians	4–2	Romo (6–9)	Kern (6–8)			6,707	52–79	W1
132	August 27		@ Cleveland Indians	0–10	Eckersley (13–10)	Galasso (0–5)			7,876	52–80	L1
133	August 28		@ Cleveland Indians	6–10	Bibby (11–10)	Abbott (10–10)			9,599	52–81	L2
134	August 30		@ New York Yankees	5–6	Lyle (11–4)	Segui (0–5)			20,116	52–82	L3
135	August 31		@ New York Yankees	4–5	Lyle (12–4)	Galasso (0–6)			17,362	52–83	L4

September

#	Date	Time (PT)	Opponent	Score	Win	Loss	Save	Time of Game	Attendance	Record	Box/ Streak
136	September 2		@ Toronto Blue Jays	4–3	Abbott (11–10)	Lemanczyk (10–13)			13,502	53–83	W1
137	September 3		@ Toronto Blue Jays	6–2	Montague (7–10)	Jefferson (8–14)	Romo (12)		15,109	54–83	W2
138	September 4		@ Toronto Blue Jays	7–2	Mitchell (2–5)	Garvin (9–14)			17,084	55–83	W3
139	September 5		Royals	4–8	Colborn (16–13)	Pole (7–12)	—		11,750	55–84	L1
140	September 6		Royals	0–10	Splittorff (13–6)	Honeycutt (0–1)	—		7,191	55–85	L2
141	September 7		Royals	7–10	Littell (7–4)	Romo (6–10)	Bird (11)		7,814	55–86	L3
142	September 8		Royals	2–7	Leonard (16–11)	Montague (7–11)	—		7,785	55–87	L4
143	September 9		Texas Rangers	8–3	House (4–5)	Perry (12–12)			8,245	56–87	W1
144	September 10		Texas Rangers	2–5	Alexander (14–10)	Mitchell (2–6)			DH	56–88	L1
145	September 10		Texas Rangers	1–7	Moret (3–2)	Kekich (5–3)			12,800	56–89	L2
146	September 11		Texas Rangers	6–4	Romo (7–10)	Lindblad (4–4)			8,363	57–89	W1
147	September 13		Milwaukee Brewers	5–6	Beare (3–3)	Abbott (11–11)	McClure (6)		7,595	57–90	L1
148	September 14		Milwaukee Brewers	5–8	Rodriguez (4–6)	Erardi (0–1)			5,718	57–91	L2
149	September 16		@ Royals	4–1	Medich (11–6)	Pattin (8–3)	—		19,072	58–91	W1
150	September 17		@ Royals	5–7	Gura (7–5)	Segui (0–6)	—		27,067	58–92	L1
151	September 18		@ Royals	3–8	Leonard (18–11)	Abbott (11–12)	—		33,397	58–93	L2
152	September 20		@ Milwaukee Brewers	1–5	Slaton (10–14)	Montague (7–12)			3,004	58–94	L3
153	September 21		@ Milwaukee Brewers	11–4	Romo (8–10)	Augustine (12–17)			3,008	59–94	W1
154	September 22		Chicago White Sox	4–5	Renko (6–2)	Burke (0–1)	LaGrow (24)		8,211	59–95	L1
155	September 23		Chicago White Sox	3–2	House (5–5)	Barrios (14–6)	Montague (4)		9,731	60–95	W1
156	September 24		Chicago White Sox	3–8	Kravec (10–8)	Segui (0–7)			17,636	60–96	L1
157	September 25		Chicago White Sox	5–4	Medich (12–6)	Stone (15–12)	Romo (13)		11,589	61–96	W1
158	September 28		@ Texas Rangers	1–3	Perry (15–12)	Abbott (11–13)			4,860	61–97	L1
159	September 29		@ Texas Rangers	2–1	Mitchell (3–6)	Alexander (17–11)	Romo (14)		4,714	62–97	W1

October

#	Date	Time (PT)	Opponent	Score	Win	Loss	Save	Time of Game	Attendance	Record	Box/ Streak
160	October 1		@ Chicago White Sox	5–3	Montague (8–12)	Barrios (14–7)	Romo (15)		DH	63–97	W2
161	October 1		@ Chicago White Sox	1–6	Kravec (11–8)	Kekich (5–4)			5,778	63–98	L1
162	October 2		@ Chicago White Sox	3–2	Abbott (12–13)	Frost (1–1)	Romo (16)		20,953	64–98	W1

=== Detailed records ===
**American League**
Opponent	Home	Away	Total	Pct.	Runs scored	Runs allowed
**AL East**
Baltimore Orioles	3–2	0–5	3–7	.300	45	39
Boston Red Sox	0–5	1–5	1–10	.091	42	84
Cleveland Indians	2–3	1–4	3–7	.300	33	61
Detroit Tigers	2–4	4–1	6–5	.545	33	47
Milwaukee Brewers	1–4	2–3	3–7	.300	43	54
New York Yankees	4–1	0–5	4–6	.400	41	46
Toronto Blue Jays	1–4	3–2	4–6	.400	39	53
	**13–23**	**11–20**	**24–43**	**.358**	**276**	**384**
**AL West**
California Angels	2–6	4–3	6–9	.400	60	77
Chicago White Sox	2–5	3–5	5–10	.333	47	83
Kansas City Royals	1–7	3–4	4–11	.267	59	108
Minnesota Twins	4–3	4–4	8–7	.533	60	84
Oakland Athletics	4–4	4–3	8–7	.533	59	64
**Seattle Mariners**	—	—	—	—	—	—
Texas Rangers	3–4	6–2	9–6	.600	63	55
	**16–28**	**24–22**	**40–50**	**.444**	**348**	**471**

==== Month-by-Month ====
Month	Games	Won	Lost	Win %	RS	RA
April	24	8	16	0.333	83	137
May	27	13	14	0.481	128	133
June	28	13	15	0.464	106	128
July	28	12	16	0.429	108	131
August	28	6	22	0.214	91	192
September	24	10	14	0.417	99	123
October	3	2	1	0.667	105	82
Total	162	64	98	0.395	624	855

	Games	Won	Lost	Win %	RS	RA
Home	81	29	52	0.358	303	419
Road	81	35	46	0.432	321	436
Total	162	64	98	0.395	624	855

=== Composite Box ===
1977 Seattle Mariners Inning–by–Inning Boxscore
Team	1	2	3	4	5	6	7	8	9	10	11	12	13	R	H	E
Opponents	116	88	95	102	106	107	107	67	58	2	3	1	0	855	1508	158
Mariners	90	65	71	61	80	67	65	66	56	10	3	0	1	624	1398	147

== Player stats ==
= Indicates team leader

=== Batting ===
==== Starters by position ====
Note: Pos = Position; G = Games played; AB = At bats; H = Hits; Avg. = Batting average; HR = Home runs; RBI = Runs batted in

Pos	Player	G	AB	H	Avg.	HR	RBI
C	Bob Stinson	105	297	80	.269	8	32
1B	Dan Meyer	159	582	159	.273	22	90
2B	José Báez	91	305	79	.259	1	17
3B	Bill Stein	151	566	144	.259	13	67
SS	Craig Reynolds	135	420	104	.248	4	28
LF	Steve Braun	139	451	106	.235	5	31
CF	Ruppert Jones	160	597	157	.263	24	76
RF	Leroy Stanton	133	454	125	.275	27	90
DH	Juan Bernhardt	89	305	74	.243	7	30

==== Other batters ====
Note: G = Games played; AB = At bats; H = Hits; Avg. = Batting average; HR = Home runs; RBI = Runs batted in

Player	G	AB	H	Avg.	HR	RBI
Dave Collins	120	402	96	.239	5	28
Carlos López	99	297	84	.283	8	34
Larry Milbourne	86	242	53	.219	2	21
Julio Cruz	60	199	51	.256	1	7
Skip Jutze	42	109	24	.220	3	15
Larry Cox	35	93	23	.247	2	6
Jimmy Sexton	14	37	8	.216	1	3
Ray Fosse	11	34	12	.353	0	5
Tommy Smith	21	27	7	.259	0	4
Puchy Delgado	13	22	4	.182	0	2
Kevin Pasley	4	13	5	.385	0	2
Joe Lis	9	13	3	.231	0	1
Tom McMillan	2	5	0	.000	0	0

=== Pitching ===
==== Starting pitchers ====
Note: G = Games pitched; IP = Innings pitched; W = Wins; L = Losses; ERA = Earned run average; SO = Strikeouts

Player	G	IP	W	L	ERA	SO
Glenn Abbott	36	204.1	12	13	4.45	100
Dick Pole	25	122.1	7	12	5.15	51
Gary Wheelock	17	88.1	6	9	4.89	47
Rick Jones	10	42.1	1	4	5.10	16
Paul Mitchell	9	39.0	3	3	4.99	20
Doc Medich	3	22.1	2	0	3.63	3
Frank MacCormack	3	7.0	0	0	3.86	4

==== Other pitchers ====
Note: G = Games pitched; IP = Innings pitched; W = Wins; L = Losses; ERA = Earned run average; SO = Strikeouts

Player	G	IP	W	L	ERA	SO
John Montague	47	182.1	8	12	4.29	98
Diego Seguí	40	110.2	0	7	5.69	91
Tom House	26	89.1	4	5	3.93	39
Dave Pagan	24	66.0	1	1	6.14	30
Stan Thomas	13	58.1	2	6	6.02	14
Bob Galasso	11	35.0	0	6	9.00	21
Rick Honeycutt	10	29.0	0	1	4.34	17

==== Relief pitchers ====
Note: G = Games pitched; W = Wins; L = Losses; SV = Saves; ERA = Earned run average; SO = Strikeouts

Player	G	W	L	SV	ERA	SO
Enrique Romo	58	8	10	16	2.83	105
Bill Laxton	43	3	2	3	4.95	49
Mike Kekich	41	5	4	3	5.60	55
Tommy Moore	14	2	1	0	4.91	13
Steve Burke	6	0	1	0	2.87	6
Greg Erardi	5	0	1	0	6.00	5
Byron McLaughlin	1	0	0	0	27.00	1

== Awards and honors ==
All-Star Game

- Ruppert Jones, OF, Reserve

== Farm system ==
Level	Team	League	Manager
A-Short Season	Bellingham Mariners	Northwest League	Bobby Floyd

LEAGUE CHAMPIONS: Bellingham
