= Berkshire Brewers =

- 1976; Pittsfield, Massachusetts

Minor league affiliations
- Class: Double-A (1976)
- League: Eastern League (1976)

Major league affiliations
- Team: Milwaukee Brewers (1976)

Minor league titles
- League titles: none

Team data
- Name: Berkshire Brewers (1976)
- Ballpark: Wahconah Park (1976)

The Berkshire Brewers were a minor league baseball team that operated in 1976. They played in the Eastern League. They were affiliated with the Milwaukee Brewers.

After that season, they moved to Holyoke, Massachusetts, where they took the nickname the Millers.

== Future Major League Berkshire Brewers ==
- Dick Davis
- Greg Erardi
- Gary Holle
- Dan Thomas
- Gary Beare
- Barry Cort
- Greg Erardi
- Sam Hinds

== Berkshire Brewers with previous Major League experience ==
- Lafayette Currence
- Lary Sorensen
