= Larry Littleton =

American baseball player (born 1954)

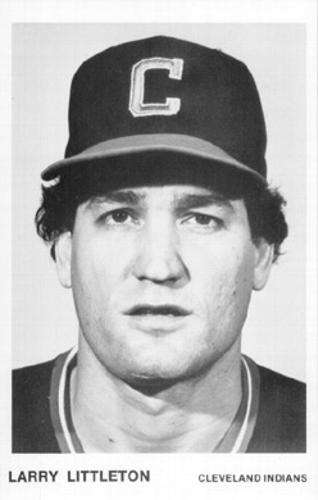
- Outfielder
- Born: April 3, 1954 (age 72); Charlotte, North Carolina, U.S.
- Batted: Right Threw: Right

MLB debut
- April 12, 1981, for the Cleveland Indians

Last MLB appearance
- May 26, 1981, for the Cleveland Indians

MLB statistics
- Batting average: .000
- Home runs: 0
- Runs batted in: 1
- Stats at Baseball Reference

Teams
- Cleveland Indians (1981)

Larry Marvin Littleton (born April 3, 1954) is an American former professional baseball outfielder who played for the Cleveland Indians during the 1981 baseball season. As of 2007, he shares with Mike Potter the Major League Baseball record for at-bats without a hit by a non-pitcher, with 23. According to Littleton, he was demoted to the minors before the midseason 1981 Major League Baseball strike and replaced on the roster with veteran Ross Grimsley so that the Indians would not have to pay Grimsley's salary.
