= Lafayette Currence =

American baseball player (born 1951)

- Pitcher
- Born: December 3, 1951 (age 74); Rock Hill, South Carolina, U.S.
- Batted: Both Threw: Left

MLB debut
- July 24, 1975, for the Milwaukee Brewers

Last MLB appearance
- September 10, 1975, for the Milwaukee Brewers

MLB statistics
- Win–loss record: 0–2
- Earned run average: 7.71
- Strikeouts: 7
- Stats at Baseball Reference

Teams
- Milwaukee Brewers (1975)

Delancey Lafayette Currence (born December 3, 1951) is a former professional baseball pitcher. He played in Major League Baseball for the Milwaukee Brewers during the 1975 season.

Currence pitched for Emmett Scott High School in Rock Hill and was signed as a free agent in 1970 by the Pittsburgh Pirates. In 1973, he was traded to the Milwaukee Brewers for Greg Erardi, and he pitched in the Class A Midwest League's 1974 All-Star Game representing the Danville Warriors, a Brewers affiliate. That season, he led the Midwest League in strikeouts, fanning 184 batters in 191 innings, and racked up a 15–6 record with an ERA of 2.73.

Currence pitched at the Major League level with the Brewers in 1975 in eight games, making one start, wearing #20. He was called up from the Brewers' AA level Eastern League team, the Thetford Mines Miners in Thetford Mines, Quebec when pitcher Ed Sprague, Sr. was put on the 60-day disabled list in July 1975. Currence started the next season with the Spokane Indians, the Brewers' AAA farm club in the Pacific Coast League, and split time that season between Spokane and the Berkshire Brewers, the new Brewers' AA Eastern League farm team. His career in organized baseball ended with 4 games at the AA level in the Eastern League with the Holyoke Millers (the third Brewers-affiliated AA Eastern League location in three years) in 1977. The Brewers released him after he was diagnosed with tendonitis in his pitching arm. He attempted to keep in shape by playing amateur baseball in Rock Hill but was unable to return to professional baseball.

Currence was named to the York County (South Carolina) Sports Hall of Fame in 2011.
