= Jim Colborn =

American baseball player (born 1946)

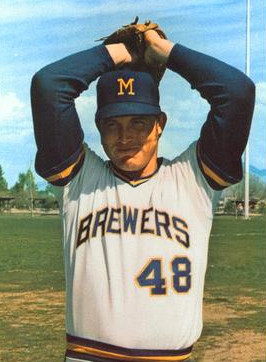
- Colborn in 1973
- Pitcher
- Born: May 22, 1946 (age 80); Santa Paula, California, U.S.
- Batted: Right Threw: Right

MLB debut
- July 13, 1969, for the Chicago Cubs

Last MLB appearance
- October 1, 1978, for the Seattle Mariners

MLB statistics
- Win–loss record: 83–88
- Earned run average: 3.80
- Strikeouts: 688
- Stats at Baseball Reference

Teams
- Chicago Cubs (1969–1971); Milwaukee Brewers (1972–1976); Kansas City Royals (1977–1978); Seattle Mariners (1978)

Career highlights and awards
- All-Star (1973); Pitched a no-hitter on May 14, 1977; Milwaukee Brewers Wall of Honor

James William Colborn (born May 22, 1946) is an American former Major League Baseball pitcher. The right-handed Colborn pitched for the Chicago Cubs (1969-1971), Milwaukee Brewers (1972-1976), Kansas City Royals (1977-1978) and Seattle Mariners (1978).

As a member of the Kansas City Royals, Colborn pitched the third no-hitter in franchise history on May 14, 1977 versus the Texas Rangers.

== Biography ==
After graduating from Whittier College with a degree in sociology, Colborn studied for his master's degree at the University of Edinburgh in Scotland, where he also starred in basketball as well as baseball, being named all-Scotland.

In 1967, the Chicago Cubs signed Colborn as an amateur free agent. He found himself in Leo Durocher's doghouse after struggling as a young relief pitcher for three years. Colborn was traded along with Brock Davis and Earl Stephenson to the Brewers for José Cardenal on December 3, 1971.

Colborn was the Brewers' first-ever 20-game winner in 1973, posting a 20–12 record with a 3.18 ERA. He also was named to the American League All-Star team, but did not pitch in the game.

Over the next three seasons, however, Colborn posted losing records (10-13 in 1974, 11–13 in 1975 and 9–15 in 1976) before being traded, along with Darrell Porter, to the Kansas City Royals. In 1977, Colborn won 18 games for a Royal team that won the second of three consecutive American League West titles (all three times, however, the Royals lost to the New York Yankees in the American League Championship Series; Colborn did not pitch in the 1977 ALCS). On May 14 of that year, Colborn no-hit the Texas Rangers 6–0, the first no-hitter by a Royal at Royals Stadium and second overall in that park, after the first of Nolan Ryan's seven career no-hitters (1973). He was dealt from the Royals to the Mariners for Steve Braun on May 31, 1978.

For eight seasons, Colborn was on Jim Tracy's staff as a pitching coach: from 2000 to 2005, when Tracy managed the Los Angeles Dodgers, and in 2006 and 2007, when Tracy managed the Pittsburgh Pirates.

In 2008, Colborn became the Texas Rangers bullpen coach.

In his career, Colborn won 83 games against 88 losses, with a 3.80 ERA and 688 strikeouts in 1597 1/3 innings pitched.

== See also ==
- List of Major League Baseball no-hitters

Preceded by John Montefusco	No-hitter pitcher May 14, 1977	Succeeded by Dennis Eckersley
Preceded by Dave Wallace	Los Angeles Dodgers Pitching Coach; 2001–2005	Succeeded by Rick Honeycutt
Preceded by Spin Williams	Pittsburgh Pirates pitching coach 2006–2007	Succeeded by Jeff Andrews
