= Chris Coletta =

American baseball player (born 1944)

- Outfielder
- Born: August 2, 1944 (age 80); Brooklyn, New York, U.S.
- Batted: Left Threw: Left

MLB debut
- August 15, 1972, for the California Angels

Last MLB appearance
- October 1, 1972, for the California Angels

MLB statistics
- Batting average: .300
- Home runs: 1
- RBI: 7
- Stats at Baseball Reference

Teams
- California Angels (1972)

Christopher Michael Coletta (born August 2, 1944) is an American former professional baseball player (corner outfielder) who played one season for the California Angels of Major League Baseball. Coletta was also with the Boston Red Sox organization and had an impressive career in the International League. He played for the now defunct Louisville Colonels—the AAA farm club for Boston at that time. He was teammates with (among others) Carlton Fisk and Jim Lonborg during that period of his career.

In fact, Coletta was in the Red Sox minor-league system for ten seasons (1963–72), from age 18 to age 28. In 1963, he hit .312 for Waterloo (Class A). In 1964, he hit .326 for Winston-Salem (Class A). Promoted to Class AA in 1965, he hit .318 for Pittsfield then, in 1966, he hit .311 for Pittsfield. During these four seasons, his on-base percentage was around .400, and his slugging percentage always over .435—all healthy numbers given the low offensive output of the era. After a poor season in 1967, he hit .314 for Savannah (Class AA) in 1968, at which point he was finally promoted to the Class AAA Louisville team. Coletta then was stuck in AAA Louisville for four seasons despite some superb statistics—he hit .294 in 1969, .332 in 1970, .311 in 1971, and .319 in 1972 (with on-base percentages around .400, and slugging percentages around .450).

In mid-August 1972, about a week after turning 28 years old, Coletta was finally liberated from the (at the time) dysfunctional Red Sox organization — he was traded to the Angels for Andy Kosco — so that the Red Sox could employ a journeyman (Kosco) in their (failed) attempt to win the AL East that year.

In his month-and-a-half stint with the Angels, Coletta hit .300. His OPS+ (on-base percentage plus slugging percentage normalized to the league average) was 130, meaning his performance was 30% better than the league average.

On August 20, in a game at Tiger Stadium in Detroit, Coletta managed a rare feat by banging out two hits in the same inning (top of the fourth).

On September 24, his 8th-inning homer off Jim Perry broke a 1–1 tie and provided the winning margin in the Angels 2–1 win over the Minnesota Twins (in what turned out to be his second-to-last Major League at bat). For the month-and-a-half, Coletta got 31 plate appearances and hit that one homer and had 7 RBI. Pro-rated over a full season (600 plate appearances), this would equate to 19 HRs and 135 RBIs.

Despite this rather impressive showing, the Angels sent him back to the minors in 1973. Given that he was turning 29 that year (which was old for a player at that time), they thought he was too old to invest much time on. Coletta was traded along with Aurelio Monteagudo from the Angels to the Phillies for Denny Doyle at the Winter Meetings on December 6, 1973, completing a transaction from four months earlier on August 14 when Philadelphia purchased Billy Grabarkewitz's contract from California. After being released by the Phillies, he played for the Red Sox organization again. In his final four minor league seasons (1973–76), Coletta hit .284, .306, .271, and .273.
