= Gary Holle =

American baseball player (born 1954)

- First base
- Born: August 11, 1954 (age 71); Watervliet, New York, U.S.
- Batted: Right Threw: Left

MLB debut
- June 2, 1979, for the Texas Rangers

Last MLB appearance
- June 14, 1979, for the Texas Rangers

MLB statistics
- Batting average: .167
- Home runs: 0
- Runs batted in: 0
- Stats at Baseball Reference

Teams
- Texas Rangers (1979)

Gary Charles Holle (born August 11, 1954) is an American former professional baseball first baseman who played for the Texas Rangers of the Major League Baseball (MLB) in 1979.

== Career ==
Prior to playing professionally, he attended Catholic Central High School and then Siena College. While at Siena, he starred in baseball and basketball, and was eventually elected to the Siena sports Hall of Fame. Holle played at Siena at a time when it was in NCAA Division II and his coach, Tony Rossi, said Holle was "like a man among boys. When he hit, the third baseman used to play in the outfield." He was an All-American basketball player, however he chose to pursue a career in baseball instead.

He was drafted by the Milwaukee Brewers in the 13th round of the 1976 Major League Baseball draft. That year, he began his professional career, playing for two teams – the Newark Co-Pilots (69 games) and the Berkshire Brewers (four games). He hit a combined .320 with 19 home runs, 16 doubles and four triples in 73 games.

In 1977, he played for the Holyoke Millers, hitting .253 with 30 home runs and 25 doubles. He split the 1978 season between the Millers (71 games) and the Spokane Indians (65 games), hitting a combined .277 with 18 home runs and 84 RBI. On December 15, 1978, he was traded by the Brewers with Ed Farmer to the Rangers for Reggie Cleveland. He spent most of 1979 in the minors, spending the first part of the season in the Rangers' chain, hitting .341 in 52 games for the Tucson Toros.

On June 2, 1979, he made his MLB debut, appearing as a pinch hitter for Rangers outfielder Johnny Grubb. He grounded out in his only at-bat of the game. Although his defensive position was first baseman, he only played in the field in one game in his brief big league career. He was mostly used as a pinch hitter. He had six at-bats in the big leagues, collecting one hit. On June 14, 1979, he played his final big league game, and on June 15 he was traded with Ed Farmer to the Chicago White Sox for Eric Soderholm. He finished the 1979 season with the White Sox Triple-A farm team, the Iowa Oaks, hitting .273 in 39 games for them.

He played for three minor league teams in 1980 – the Oaks, the Phoenix Giants and the Charleston Charlies. He hit a combined .316 with 12 home runs and 60 RBI in 111 games. In 1981, he played for the Edmonton Trappers, hitting .327 with 26 home runs and 88 RBI. He was traded to the Philadelphia Phillies on October 30, 1981, with Dewey Robinson for minor leaguer Jose Castro, however he never played in the Phillies' system.

Overall, he hit 297 with 111 home runs in six minor league seasons.

After his retirement as a player, Holle served as General Manager of the Continental Basketball Association's Albany Patroons. In that position, the Patroons won the 1984 CBA Championship, with Phil Jackson as its coach.

His son, Gary Holle Jr., played basketball at Siena College.

Another son of his, Greg Holle, played baseball at the Christian Brothers Academy in the Albany, New York area and was drafted by the New York Yankees in the 35th Round of the Amateur Entry Draft in 2007. However, he opted instead to attend college at Texas Christian University, before later being drafted by the Milwaukee Brewers
