= Andy Kosco =

American baseball player (1941–2025)

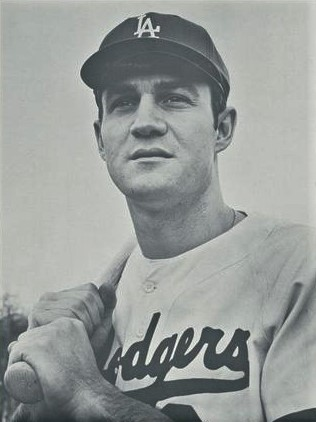
- Outfielder
- Born: October 5, 1941; Youngstown, Ohio, U.S.
- Died: December 19, 2025 (aged 84); Struthers, Ohio, U.S.
- Batted: Right Threw: Right

MLB debut
- August 13, 1965, for the Minnesota Twins

Last MLB appearance
- July 30, 1974, for the Cincinnati Reds

MLB statistics
- Batting average: .236
- Home runs: 73
- Runs batted in: 267
- Stats at Baseball Reference

Teams
- Minnesota Twins (1965–1967); New York Yankees (1968); Los Angeles Dodgers (1969–1970); Milwaukee Brewers (1971); California Angels (1972); Boston Red Sox (1972); Cincinnati Reds (1973–1974)

Andrew John Kosco (/ˈkɑːskoʊ/ KAHS-koh; October 5, 1941 – December 19, 2025) was an American professional baseball outfielder. He played in Major League Baseball (MLB) for the Minnesota Twins, New York Yankees, Los Angeles Dodgers, Milwaukee Brewers, California Angels, Boston Red Sox, and Cincinnati Reds.

== Formative years ==
Kosco was born in Youngstown, Ohio, an industrial center located near the Pennsylvania border. At 6 ft 3 in (191 cm) and 215 pounds (98 kg), Kosco was drawn to sports, but also seriously considered pursuing a degree in law.

While at Struthers High School in Struthers, OH, Kosco was dominant at many sports. He averaged 25 points a game in basketball, and as a senior he had a .715 batting average. Michigan State University offered to have him play baseball and basketball, while Ohio State University offered for him to play baseball and football.

== Early career ==
Shortly before the 1959 season, Kosco was signed by the Detroit Tigers as an amateur free agent. He was released by Detroit in January 1964, and promptly signed on as a free agent with the Minnesota Twins.

In August 1965, Minnesota picked him from its AAA Denver club to replace injured player Harmon Killebrew. Kosco, who had largely reconsidered his plans to pursue law, accepted the opportunity.

As sports author Jim Thielman notes, it was common at the time for baseball's commissioner to have input on World Series rosters, and Commissioner Ford Frick suggested the Twins bring their roster to 25 men by dropping a player who had not participated for the entire season. As a late-season replacement who played in the outfield, where the Twins were well-stocked with veterans, Kosco was kept off the World Series roster.

== Later career ==
In October 1967, Kosco was purchased by the Oakland Athletics. A month later, however, he was drafted by the New York Yankees.

As a Yankee in 1968, Kosco appeared in 131 games and had 492 plate appearances, playing the outfield and first base, hitting .240 with 15 home runs and 59 runs batted in.

In December 1968, he was traded by the Yankees to the Los Angeles Dodgers for Mike Kekich. Kosco admitted that he was not happy when he had been told that the Yankees traded him away. He felt a great amount of pride playing for the Yankees, and loved being around Mickey Mantle. Upon leaving the Yankees, Kosco said, "I consider Mickey the most courageous person I've ever known. I loved being a Yankee."

In February 1971, the Dodgers traded Kosco to the Milwaukee Brewers for Al Downing. He was traded again to the California Angels (for Tommie Reynolds) and to the Boston Red Sox (for Chris Coletta) before completing his professional baseball career with the Cincinnati Reds, with whom he batted .280 in 118 at-bats in 1973 on a team that won the National League West title but lost to the New York Mets in the NLCS. Kosco went 3-for-10 in that Series, including collecting the only two Reds hits in Jon Matlack's Game Two shutout.

Kosco played for the Toledo Mud Hens in 1975 when the team was the AAA-affiliate of the Phillies.

== Personal life and death ==
Kosco's two sons, Bryn and Dru, both played professional baseball. Bryn also played in the College World Series for NC State.

Kosco died on December 19, 2025, at the age of 84.
