= Stan Thomas (baseball) =

American baseball player (born 1949)

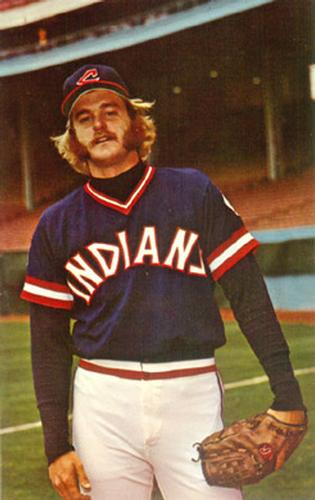
- Pitcher
- Born: July 11, 1949 (age 77); Rumford, Maine, U.S.
- Batted: Right Threw: Right

MLB debut
- July 5, 1974, for the Texas Rangers

Last MLB appearance
- October 2, 1977, for the New York Yankees

MLB statistics
- Win–loss record: 11–14
- Earned run average: 3.70
- Strikeouts: 123
- Stats at Baseball Reference

Teams
- Texas Rangers (1974–1975); Cleveland Indians (1976); Seattle Mariners (1977); New York Yankees (1977)

Stanley Brown Thomas (born July 11, 1949) is an American former professional baseball pitcher. Thomas pitched in all or part of four seasons in Major League Baseball from 1974 until 1977.

== Amateur career ==
Thomas attended Florida State University and the University of New Haven. From 1968 to 1970, he played collegiate summer baseball in the Cape Cod Baseball League for the Yarmouth Red Sox.

== Professional career ==
Thomas was originally drafted by the Washington Senators in the 27th round of the 1971 Major League Baseball draft. The next season, the Senators became the Texas Rangers, and Thomas made his major league debut in 1974 for that team. After two seasons in Texas, he was traded along with Ron Pruitt from the Rangers to the Cleveland Indians for John Ellis at the Winter Meetings on December 9, 1975. Thomas was chosen in the 1976 MLB expansion draft by the Seattle Mariners. He split the 1977 season between the Mariners and the New York Yankees to end his major league career. He was dealt along with cash from the Yankees to the Chicago White Sox for Jim Spencer and Tommy Cruz on December 12, 1977. The transaction also included an exchange of minor-league right‐handed pitcher, with Ed Ricks going to the White Sox and Bob Polinsky to the Yankees.
