= Paul Doyle (baseball) =

American baseball player (1939–2020)

- Relief pitcher
- Born: October 2, 1939; Philadelphia, Pennsylvania, U.S.
- Died: May 6, 2020 (aged 80); Huntington Beach, California, U.S.
- Batted: Left Threw: Left

MLB debut
- May 28, 1969, for the Atlanta Braves

Last MLB appearance
- May 2, 1972, for the California Angels

MLB statistics
- Win–loss record: 5–3
- Earned run average: 3.79
- Strikeouts: 65
- Stats at Baseball Reference

Teams
- Atlanta Braves (1969); California Angels (1970); San Diego Padres (1970); California Angels (1972)

Paul Sinnott Doyle (October 2, 1939 – May 6, 2020) was an American professional baseball player and left-handed relief pitcher who appeared in 87 games over three seasons (1969–1970; 1972) for the Atlanta Braves, San Diego Padres and California Angels of Major League Baseball (MLB). He was listed as 5 feet 11 inches (1.80 m) tall and 172 pounds (78 kg).

Doyle was born in Philadelphia, Pennsylvania, the ninth of ten children; his family moved to Huron, Ohio, about 50 miles (80 km) west of Cleveland, when Doyle was a child. He graduated from Huron High School in 1958. His professional baseball career began in 1959 in the Detroit Tigers' farm system. It would take him ten years and five MLB organizations before he reached the majors.

As a 29-year-old rookie, Doyle was an effective member of the 1969 Braves' bullpen, working in 36 games and 39 innings pitched, winning each of his two decisions, posting four saves, compiling a strong 2.08 earned run average, and helping his team win the National League West Division championship. Doyle appeared in Game 2 of the 1969 NLCS against the New York Mets; in one inning, he allowed two unearned runs on two hits. The Mets took the contest, 11–6, and proceeded to sweep the best-of-three series en route to their first world championship.

The Braves sold Doyle's contract to the Angels that November, and he worked in 49 games in 1970, his only full campaign in MLB. However, after posting a 3–1 record, a 5.14 earned run average, and five saves through August 16, he was sold again, this time to the Padres. Pitching for last-place San Diego over the final weeks of the 1970 season, Doyle earned two saves but dropped both of his decisions. He then returned to the Angels' organization to spend 1971 at Triple-A Salt Lake City. Suffering from a sore arm, he was able to make only two appearances for the 1972 Angels before retiring from the game.

In his 87-game MLB career, Doyle allowed 85 hits and 46 bases on balls in 901/3 innings pitched, with 65 strikeouts. In addition to his 5–3 career won–lost record, he was credited with 11 saves.

Doyle died on May 6, 2020.
