= Andy Mota =

Dominican baseball player (born 1966)

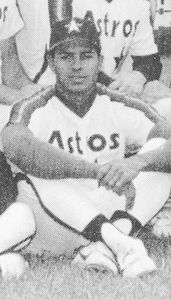
- Mota in 1988
- Second baseman
- Born: March 4, 1966 (age 59); Santo Domingo, Dominican Republic
- Batted: Right Threw: Right

MLB debut
- August 31, 1991, for the Houston Astros

Last MLB appearance
- October 6, 1991, for the Houston Astros

MLB statistics
- Batting average: .189
- Hits: 17
- Runs: 4
- Stats at Baseball Reference

Teams
- Houston Astros (1991)

Andrés Alberto Mota Matos (born March 4, 1966) is a Dominican former Major League Baseball second baseman and current player agent.

== Early life ==
Mota was born in Santo Domingo, Dominican Republic and is the son of former major league player Manny Mota, as well as the brother of José Mota and cousin of José Báez.

Mota attended Golden West College. He then attended California State University, Fullerton.

== Baseball career ==
He was initially drafted in the sixth round of the 1985 amateur draft by the Kansas City Royals, but did not sign. In 1987 he was drafted by the Houston Astros in the twelfth round. Mota amassed just 90 at-bats in 27 games at second base for the Astros in 1991, batting .189.

Mota continued playing in the minor leagues through the end of the 1994 season.

== After baseball ==
Today, Mota is a player agent. He is a senior vice president of baseball at Wasserman.

== See also ==
- List of second-generation Major League Baseball players
