= Mike Potter (baseball) =

American baseball player (born 1951)

- Outfielder
- Born: May 16, 1951 (age 75); Montebello, California, U.S.
- Batted: Right Threw: Right

MLB debut
- September 6, 1976, for the St. Louis Cardinals

Last MLB appearance
- October 2, 1977, for the St. Louis Cardinals

MLB statistics
- Batting average: .000
- Home runs: 0
- Runs batted in: 0
- Stats at Baseball Reference

Teams
- St. Louis Cardinals (1976–1977)

Michael Gary Potter (born May 16, 1951) is an American former professional baseball outfielder who played from 1976 to 1977 for the St. Louis Cardinals. With no hits in 23 career at-bats, he is tied with Larry Littleton for the most career MLB at-bats by a non-pitcher without a hit.

== Career ==
Originally drafted by the Detroit Tigers in the 3rd round of the 1970 amateur draft, Potter chose not to sign. However, when he was drafted by the Cardinals out of Mount San Antonio College in the sixth round of the secondary phase of the 1971 amateur draft, he did sign.

Potter made his major league debut on September 6, 1976, at the age of 25. Facing pitcher Steve Dunning, Potter went 0–3 with two strikeouts in his big league debut. In 16 at-bats in his first season, Potter did not collect a single hit. However, he did walk once.

He appeared in only five games in 1977, collecting no hits in seven at-bats. In total, Potter played in 14 big league games, collecting no hits in 23 at-bats. He is tied with Larry Littleton for most career at-bats by a non-pitcher without a hit.

He played his final big league game on October 2, 1977.

Potter returned to the minors to bring his professional career to a close. In the 1978 minor league season, Potter hit 22 home runs and drove in 94 RBI. On October 27, 1978, he was sent by the Cardinals to the Seattle Mariners to complete an earlier trade made on June 26, 1978. Originally, the Cardinals sent a player to be named later to the Mariners for José Báez. He hit only five home runs in 117 minor league games in 1979.
