= Mike Parrott =

American baseball player (born 1954)

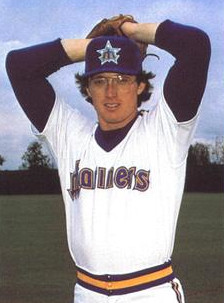
- Parrott in 1981
- Pitcher
- Born: December 6, 1954 (age 71); Oxnard, California, U.S.
- Batted: Right Threw: Right

MLB debut
- September 5, 1977, for the Baltimore Orioles

Last MLB appearance
- September 29, 1981, for the Seattle Mariners

MLB statistics
- Win–loss record: 19–39
- Earned run average: 4.87
- Strikeouts: 266
- Stats at Baseball Reference

Teams
- Baltimore Orioles (1977); Seattle Mariners (1978–1981)

Michael Everett Arch Parrott (born December 6, 1954), nicknamed "Bird," is an American former Major League Baseball pitcher. Parrott graduated from Adolfo Camarillo High School in Camarillo, California in 1973. He was drafted by the Baltimore Orioles in the first round (15th overall) of the 1973 Major League Baseball draft. During a five-year baseball career, he pitched for the Orioles (1977) and the Seattle Mariners (1977–81).

A minor league pitching coach for over 30 years, Parrott served as the pitching coach of the Kane County Cougars, the Class-A affiliate of the Arizona Diamondbacks, in 2019. This followed several years in the same position with the Hillsboro Hops. He is now a roving instructor in the D-Backs' system.

== Professional career ==
Parrott went 15–7 with a 3.42 earned run average (ERA) and an International League-leading 146 strikeouts with the Rochester Red Wings and was named the circuit's Most Valuable Pitcher in 1977. He was called up later that year by the Orioles, and in three games, he gave up just one earned run (2.08 ERA).

Parrott was traded from the Orioles to the Mariners for Carlos Lopez and Tommy Moore at the Winter Meetings on December 7, 1977. In 1979, Parrott won a career high 14 games and recorded a 3.77 ERA in 38 games (30 starts) for the Mariners. He also led all Seattle pitchers in wins that year. After winning Seattle's opener in 1980, Parrott lost 16 straight to finish the season at 1–16, the longest such streak of the 1980s, and also recorded a 7.28 ERA in 27 games (16 starts). On March 5, 1982, he was traded by the Mariners to the Milwaukee Brewers for Thad Bosley. He never made a Major League roster after this.

In 1993, Parrott was named to the Ventura County Sports Hall of Fame.

Preceded by Glenn Abbott	Opening Day starting pitcher for the Seattle Mariners; 1980	Succeeded by Glenn Abbott
