= Tommy Moore (baseball) =

American baseball player (1948–2017)

- Pitcher
- Born: July 7, 1948; Lynwood, California, U.S.
- Died: November 16, 2017 (aged 69); Pioneertown, California, U.S.
- Batted: Right Threw: Right

MLB debut
- September 15, 1972, for the New York Mets

Last MLB appearance
- May 15, 1977, for the Seattle Mariners

MLB statistics
- Win–loss record: 2–4
- Earned run average: 5.40
- Strikeouts: 40
- Stats at Baseball Reference

Teams
- New York Mets (1972–1973); St. Louis Cardinals (1975); Texas Rangers (1975); Seattle Mariners (1977)

Tommy Joe Moore (July 7, 1948 – November 16, 2017) was an American professional baseball pitcher, who played in Major League Baseball (MLB), in parts of four seasons between 1972 and 1977.

== Early years ==
Fresh out of John Glenn High School in Norwalk, California, Moore was drafted by the Minnesota Twins in the 28th round of the 1966 Major League Baseball draft, but did not sign. Seven months later, while a student at Cerritos College, the New York Mets drafted him in the tenth round of the January 1967 Secondary draft, and he signed.

While a student at Cerritos, Moore toiled around in the lower levels of the Mets' farm system, going 14-18 with a 3.59 earned run average (ERA) until he had a standout 1972 season with the Mets' triple A affiliate, the Tidewater Tides. Moore went 11-5 with a 2.80 ERA to earn a September call-up to the big league club.

== Major league career ==
=== New York Mets ===
Moore made his Major League debut in "mop up duty" following a poor outing by Gary Gentry. With the Mets already trailing 6-0 to the Chicago Cubs, he took the mound in the third inning. Moore successfully stopped the bleeding until the sixth inning. With one out, Billy Williams hit a home run. The next two batters followed with a double and a triple. A sacrifice fly and a ground out to the pitcher later, Moore escaped the inning a single shy of giving up a cycle. He was far more successful in his second appearance, when he pitched two innings against the Pittsburgh Pirates, and only surrendered one single. Moore made his first start on October 2, and was in line for the 1-0 win when he exited the game in the eighth inning with one out, and runners on first and third. Former minor league teammate Ken Singleton, now with the Montreal Expos, drove in the tying run to give Moore the no-decision.

Moore spent most of 1973 with Tidewater, with the exception of a brief call-up in May for the injury-riddled club. He suffered his first career loss against the San Francisco Giants in his last outing before returning to Tidewater. He spent the entire 1974 season at Tidewater.

=== St. Louis Cardinals ===
Moore was traded along with Ray Sadecki from the Mets to the St. Louis Cardinals for Joe Torre on October 13, 1974. Cardinal manager Red Schoendienst did not seem to have much faith in Moore, as he was used strictly in mop up duty for the entirety of his two month stay with the club. Despite a respectable 3.86 ERA posted during his tenure in St. Louis, every time he was called upon to pitch, the Redbirds were already losing, and usually by several runs.

=== Texas Rangers ===
Moore was sent along with Ed Brinkman from the Cardinals to the Texas Rangers for Willie Davis on June 4, 1975. He had a similar role in Texas; however, after pitching 9 2/3 innings over five appearances, and only allowing one earned run, he was given more responsibility. Moore entered a save situation on July 28, but was unable to convert, and ended up being credited with the loss. A week later, despite pitching well, he suffered a hard luck loss on his record against the California Angels, and once again found himself in mop up duty for the remainder of the season. Moore spent all of 1976 with the Rangers' triple A affiliate, the Sacramento Solons.

=== Seattle Mariners ===
On October 24, 1976 Moore‘s contract was purchased by the expansion Seattle Mariners. His first appearance for the M's came on April 8, 1977 with the opportunity to save the franchise's first win. Ineffectiveness and sloppy play on the field prevented that from happening; however, Seattle did manage to mount a comeback in the ninth inning for the historic victory. On April 13, Moore earned his first career win. He entered an extra innings game against the Minnesota Twins with the bases loaded, and only one out. Moore retired the next two batters to end the threat, and pitched two more scoreless innings. In the bottom of the thirteenth, Steve Braun drove in Larry Milbourne with the winning run for the Mariners.

Moore lost his only start with Seattle. Facing the Twins, he only allowed two hits through his first four innings. Moore then allowed a lone run in each of the fifth and sixth innings, before the wheels fell off in the seventh. On May 12, he earned his second, and final, career win, by defeating the New York Yankees. Moore would make just one more appearance before spending the rest of the season in the minors.

Moore was dealt along with Carlos López from the Mariners to the Baltimore Orioles for Mike Parrott at the Winter Meetings on December 7, 1977, but he was cut during Spring training 1978. Through four MLB seasons, his career statistics posted include making 42 game appearances, going 2-4, with 40 strikeouts, 40 walks, and a 5.40 ERA, in 88 innings pitched.
