= Kevin Pasley =

American baseball player (born 1953)

- Catcher
- Born: July 22, 1953 (age 73); The Bronx, New York, U.S.
- Batted: Right Threw: Right

MLB debut
- October 2, 1974, for the Los Angeles Dodgers

Last MLB appearance
- October 1, 1978, for the Seattle Mariners

MLB statistics
- Batting average: .254
- Hits: 31
- Runs batted in: 9
- Stats at Baseball Reference

Teams
- Los Angeles Dodgers (1974, 1976–1977); Seattle Mariners (1977–1978)

Kevin Patrick Pasley (born July 22, 1953) is an American former professional baseball catcher whose career spanned 12 seasons. He played in Major League Baseball (MLB) for the Los Angeles Dodgers and Seattle Mariners. He had a .254 batting average with eight runs scored, 31 hits, seven doubles, one home run, and nine runs batted in (RBIs). Pasley hit his only major league home run in his final at-bat in the majors on October 1, 1978.

Pasley was drafted by the Dodgers out of Chaminade High School during the 1971 MLB draft. He debuted professionally that year in the Dodgers minor league organization with the Class A Short Season Medford Dodgers. Pasley spent the majority of his career in the minor leagues, playing with the Class-A Daytona Beach Dodgers, Double-A Waterbury Dodgers, Triple-A Albuquerque Dukes in the Dodgers system from 1972 to 1977, the Triple-A San Jose Missions (1978), the Triple-A Portland Beavers (1979), the Triple-A Syracuse Chiefs (1980–81), the Double-A Knoxville Blue Jays (1981), the Triple-A Evansville Triplets (1982), and the Double-A Birmingham Barons (1982).

== Early life ==
Pasley was born on July 22, 1953, in the Bronx, New York. He attended Chaminade High School in Mineola, New York. During the 1971 Major League Baseball draft, Pasley was selected in the 29^{th} round by the Los Angeles Dodgers.

== Professional career ==
=== Los Angeles Dodgers ===
After being drafted by the Los Angeles Dodgers in 1971, Pasley made his professional baseball debut that season with the Medford Dodgers, Los Angeles' Class A-Short Season minor league baseball affiliate. With Medford, Pasley batted .280 with 23 runs scored, and five doubles in 24 games played. Defensively, Pasley was used as a catcher. For his second season, Pasley was assigned to the Class-A Daytona Beach Dodgers where he was to assume the role as full-time catcher, and José Báez was slated to be his back-up. In late-July, Pasley was hit in the back with a baseball bat, which caused him to miss some playing time. With Daytona Beach that season, he batted .275 with 129 hits, 11 doubles, one and triple in 126 games played.

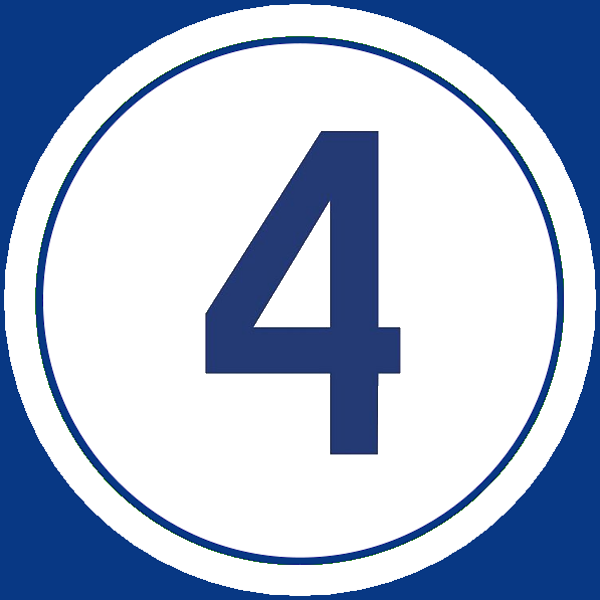
Pasley wore number four when he was a member of the Los Angeles Dodgers. The Dodgers later retired the number in honor of Duke Snider.

In 1973, Pasley joined the Double-A Waterbury Dodgers of the Eastern League. With Waterbury, he batted .260 with 99 hits, 17 doubles, two triples, and one home run in 115 games played. Pasley was scheduled to be a September call-up for the Los Angeles Dodgers that season, but he never appeared in a game. Pasley was re-signed by Los Angeles after the season. He was assigned to the Triple-A Albuquerque Dukes of the Pacific Coast League at the start of the 1974 season. With the Dukes, he batted .314 with 50 runs scored, 115 hits, 12 doubles, two triples, two home runs, and 48 runs batted in (RBIs) in 105 games played. Pasley made his Major League Baseball (MLB) debut that season after being called up by Los Angeles late into the season. He made his debut on October 2, 1974, against the Houston Astros. In that game, he did not make a plate appearance. Defensively, he played two innings at the catcher position and make one putout and committed no errors.

Pasley re-signed with the Los Angeles Dodgers before the start of the 1975 season. He spent the entire season at the Triple-A level with Albuquerque. In 98 games with Albuquerque, he batted .249 with 37 runs scored, 84 hits, seven doubles, two home runs, and 34 RBIs in 98 games played. All of his games on defense were spent at the catcher position. At the start of the 1976 season, Pasley was assigned to the Dukes. In 122 games that season with the Dodgers' Triple-A affiliate, he batted .321 with 68 runs scored, 148 hits, 24 doubles, nine triples, two home runs, 60 RBIs, and eight stolen bases. He played 107 at catcher and six games in the outfield. Pasley was called up in September to the Dodgers. He made his major league debut on September 7 against the San Diego Padres. In that game, he was walked once and did not get a hit in one at-bat. His first hit came on September 9, against the San Francisco Giants. With the Dodgers, he batted .231 with four runs scored, 12 hits, two doubles, and two RBIs in 23 games played. In the field, Pasley committed three errors and made 86 putouts in 23 games as a catcher.

On February 1, 1977, the Dodgers re-signed Pasley. At the start of the 1977 season, Baseball Digest named Pasley as a rookie to "watch". He started the 1977 season at the Triple-A level with the Albuquerque Dukes. With the Dukes, he batted .304 with 41 runs scored, 112 hits, 18 doubles, one triple, one home run, and 60 RBIs in 69 games played. In August, he was called up to Los Angeles and made his season debut on August 6 against the Philadelphia Phillies, getting one hit in three at-bats. In one other game with the Dodgers that year, Pasley did not make a plate appearance. On August 17, he was optioned to the minor leagues.

=== Seattle Mariners ===
In September 1977, the Seattle Mariners purchased Pasley from the Dodgers. He made his debut with the Mariners on September 11, against the Texas Rangers, getting one hit in four at-bats during that game. In four games with the Mariners that season, he batted .385 with five hits in 13 at-bats. Combined between the Dodgers and the Mariners that year, Pasley had six hits in 16 at-bats, putting his average at .375. In January 1978, the Daily Record cited the Mariners' catching, and Pasley specifically, as strong points for Seattle going into the 1978 season. Pasley made Seattle's roster out of spring training in 1978. From April 9 to May 2, Pasley batted .115 in 26 at-bats over 10 games. He was then sent down to Triple-A San Jose Missions. In the minors, he batted .261 with 32 runs scored, 94 hits, 19 doubles, one triple, three home runs, and 43 RBIs in 98 games played. He was called up to the majors in late-August. On October 1, Pasley hit his only career major league home run during his final at-bat of the game and his big league career. On March 28, 1979, the Mariners released Pasley.

=== Later career ===
In mid-July 1979, Pasley joined the Portland Beavers, the Triple-A affiliates of the Pittsburgh Pirates. With the Beavers that year, he batted .278 with seven runs scored, 15 hits, two doubles, and five RBIs in 20 games played. Defensively, he played 18 games at the catcher spot. Pasley joined the Toronto Blue Jays organization in 1980. The team assigned him to the Triple-A Syracuse Chiefs of the International League. With the Chiefs that year, he batted .248 with 16 runs scored, 75 hits, seven doubles, three triples, two home runs, and 35 RBIs in 86 games played. In the field, Pasley played 80 games behind the plate.

Pasley split the 1981 season between the Triple-A Syracuse Chiefs and the Double-A Knoxville Blue Jays, who were both affiliate of the Toronto Blue Jays at the time. In 86 games at the Double-A level, he batted .281 with 31 runs scored, 85 hits, 13 doubles, one triple, four home runs, and 33 RBIs. With Knoxville, he played 38 games at the catcher position, 26 games at first base, and one game in the outfield. In just 10 games with the Chiefs, Pasley compiled a .375 batting average with five runs scored, 12 hits, and two doubles. Between the two clubs, his batting average was .290.

On March 10, 1982, Pasley signed with the Detroit Tigers. The Tigers subsequently assigned him to their minor league organization. He split the year between the Triple-A Evansville Triplets, and the Double-A Birmingham Barons. At the Triple-A level, he batted .273 with three hits in 11 at-bats. With the Barons, he batted .257 with five runs scored, 19 hits, and two doubles in 20 games played. Between the two teams, his average was .259. The season was his final in professional baseball.

== See also ==
- List of Major League Baseball players with a home run in their final major league at bat
