= Don Rose (baseball) =

American baseball player (born 1947)

- Pitcher
- Born: March 19, 1947 (age 79); Covina, California, U.S.
- Batted: Right Threw: Right

MLB debut
- September 15, 1971, for the New York Mets

Last MLB appearance
- April 23, 1974, for the San Francisco Giants

MLB statistics
- Win–loss record: 1–4
- Earned run average: 4.14
- Strikeouts: 40
- Stats at Baseball Reference

Teams
- New York Mets (1971); California Angels (1972); San Francisco Giants (1974)

Donald Gary Rose (born March 19, 1947) is an American former professional baseball player who played three seasons for the New York Mets, California Angels, and San Francisco Giants of Major League Baseball.

On May 24, 1972, Rose became only the third Major League pitcher in history to hit a home run on the very first pitch they faced in their first plate appearance. It was the only home run of his Major League career.

== See also ==
- List of Major League Baseball players with a home run in their first major league at bat
