= Greg Erardi =

American baseball player (born 1954)

- Pitcher
- Born: May 31, 1954 (age 72); Syracuse, New York, U.S.
- Batted: Right Threw: Right

MLB debut
- September 6, 1977, for the Seattle Mariners

Last MLB appearance
- September 24, 1977, for the Seattle Mariners

MLB statistics
- Win–loss record: 0–1
- Earned run average: 6.00
- Strikeouts: 5
- Stats at Baseball Reference

Teams
- Seattle Mariners (1977)

Joseph Gregory Erardi (born May 31, 1954) is an American former professional baseball pitcher. He pitches in five Major League Baseball (MLB) games for the Seattle Mariners during their inaugural season in 1977.

Erardi attended Liverpool High School in Liverpool, New York and Christian Brothers Academy in DeWitt, New York, and was selected by the Milwaukee Brewers in the 24th round of the 1972 MLB draft. The Brewers traded Erardi to the Pittsburgh Pirates in September 1973 for pitcher Lafayette Currence, who wound up pitching for Milwaukee in 1975. Erardi was released by the Pirates organization in June 1975 and re-signed with the Brewers organization. In November 1976, the Seattle Mariners made Erardi the 60th pick in the 1976 expansion draft.

Erardi made his MLB debut with the Mariners during their inaugural season on September 6, 1977, retiring all three Kansas City Royals he faced to end a game lost by the Mariners 10–0. He pitched in a total of five games, all in relief. The Mariners released him after he spent the 1978 season in Triple-A.

Erardi took classes at New York University in his baseball off-seasons and finished his undergraduate degree before retiring from baseball. He finished an MBA degree from the Wharton School of Business and went on to become managing director of Salomon Brothers.
