= Darrell Johnson =

American baseball player, coach, manager, and scout (1928–2004)

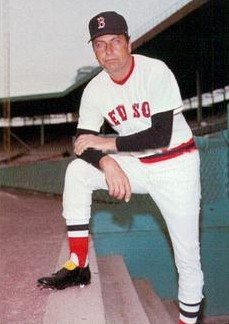
- Johnson with the Boston Red Sox in 1974
- Catcher / Manager
- Born: August 25, 1928; Horace, Nebraska, U.S.
- Died: May 3, 2004 (aged 75); Fairfield, California, U.S.
- Batted: Right Threw: Right

MLB debut
- April 20, 1952, for the St. Louis Browns

Last MLB appearance
- June 6, 1962, for the Baltimore Orioles

MLB statistics
- Batting average: .234
- Home runs: 2
- Runs batted in: 28
- Managerial record: 472–590
- Winning %: .444
- Stats at Baseball Reference

Teams
- As player: St. Louis Browns (1952); Chicago White Sox (1952); New York Yankees (1957–1958); St. Louis Cardinals (1960); Philadelphia Phillies (1961); Cincinnati Reds (1961–1962); Baltimore Orioles (1962); As manager: Boston Red Sox (1974–1976); Seattle Mariners (1977–1980); Texas Rangers (1982); As coach: St. Louis Cardinals (1960–1961); Baltimore Orioles (1962); Boston Red Sox (1968–1969); Texas Rangers (1981–1982); New York Mets (1983, 1993)

Career highlights and awards
- World Series champion (1958)

Darrell Dean Johnson (August 25, 1928 – May 3, 2004) was an American professional catcher, coach, manager and scout in Major League Baseball (MLB). As a manager, he led the 1975 Boston Red Sox to the American League pennant, and was named "Manager of the Year" by both The Sporting News and the Associated Press.

== Playing career ==
Johnson was born in Horace, Nebraska, and graduated from Ord, Nebraska, High School in 1944. He was signed by the St. Louis Browns as an amateur free agent in 1949 and made his Major League debut with the Browns on April 20, 1952. A reserve catcher during his six-year Major League career (1952; 1957–1958; 1960–1962), Johnson also played for the Chicago White Sox, New York Yankees, St. Louis Cardinals, Philadelphia Phillies, Cincinnati Reds and Baltimore Orioles, who released him on June 12, 1962, ending his playing career. He was listed as 6 feet 1 inch (1.85 m) tall and 180 pounds (82 kg) and threw and batted right-handed. In 134 MLB games played, he batted .234 lifetime, with his 75 hits including six doubles, one triple and two home runs.

Johnson's playing career was interrupted by an eleven-month stint as an MLB coach with the St. Louis Cardinals in 1960–1961. After playing in eight games, with three plate appearances, for the 1960 Cardinals, he was released as a player on August 5 and added to the coaching staff of manager Solly Hemus, then reappointed for 1961. When the Redbirds fired Hemus on July 6, 1961, Johnson was released along with him. Three days later, he signed a player's contract with the last-place Philadelphia Phillies and caught 21 games for them in five weeks before being sold to the pennant-contending Cincinnati Reds on August 14.

The Reds were then 2 1/2 games behind the first-place Los Angeles Dodgers, but over the final six weeks of the season they overtook the Dodgers to win the National League championship by four full contests. Johnson appeared in 20 games (including 17 as the club's starting catcher, with the Reds going 8–9). In limited duty, he batted .315 with 17 hits, including his second and last big-league home run, hit off the Dodgers' Johnny Podres on August 16. He appeared in the 1961 World Series against his former team, the Yankees, and had two singles in four at bats (both of them off Baseball Hall of Famer Whitey Ford) as the Reds lost to the slugging Yanks of Roger Maris and Mickey Mantle, four games to one. He started Games 1 and 4, both of them Cincinnati defeats.

The Reds released Johnson only a few days into the 1962 season, and he signed with the Orioles as a backup catcher before retiring as a player in June and serving out the year as Baltimore's bullpen coach.

== Manager of Red Sox, Mariners and Rangers ==
=== Overview ===
He then became a minor league manager in the Orioles system and won championships with the Rochester Red Wings of the Triple-A International League in 1964 and Elmira Pioneers of the Double-A Eastern League in 1966. His demotion was the result of an exchange requested by Red Wings president Morrie Silver, who was disappointed with a losing 1965 campaign and wanted the Pioneers' Earl Weaver, coming off a winning season, to manage his team instead.

After a year spent scouting for the 1967 Yankees, Johnson was named pitching coach of the Boston Red Sox on October 31, 1967, succeeding Sal Maglie who had been released after the World Series. When manager Dick Williams was fired in September 1969, Johnson was retained by the Red Sox as a scout in 1970, then managed Boston's Louisville Colonels International League affiliate in 1971–72. In 1973, he became the first manager of the Triple-A Pawtucket Red Sox, finishing 78–68 and winning his second Governors' Cup, emblematic of the International League's playoff championship, in his only PawSox season. That championship earned him a promotion to the parent club as Red Sox manager.

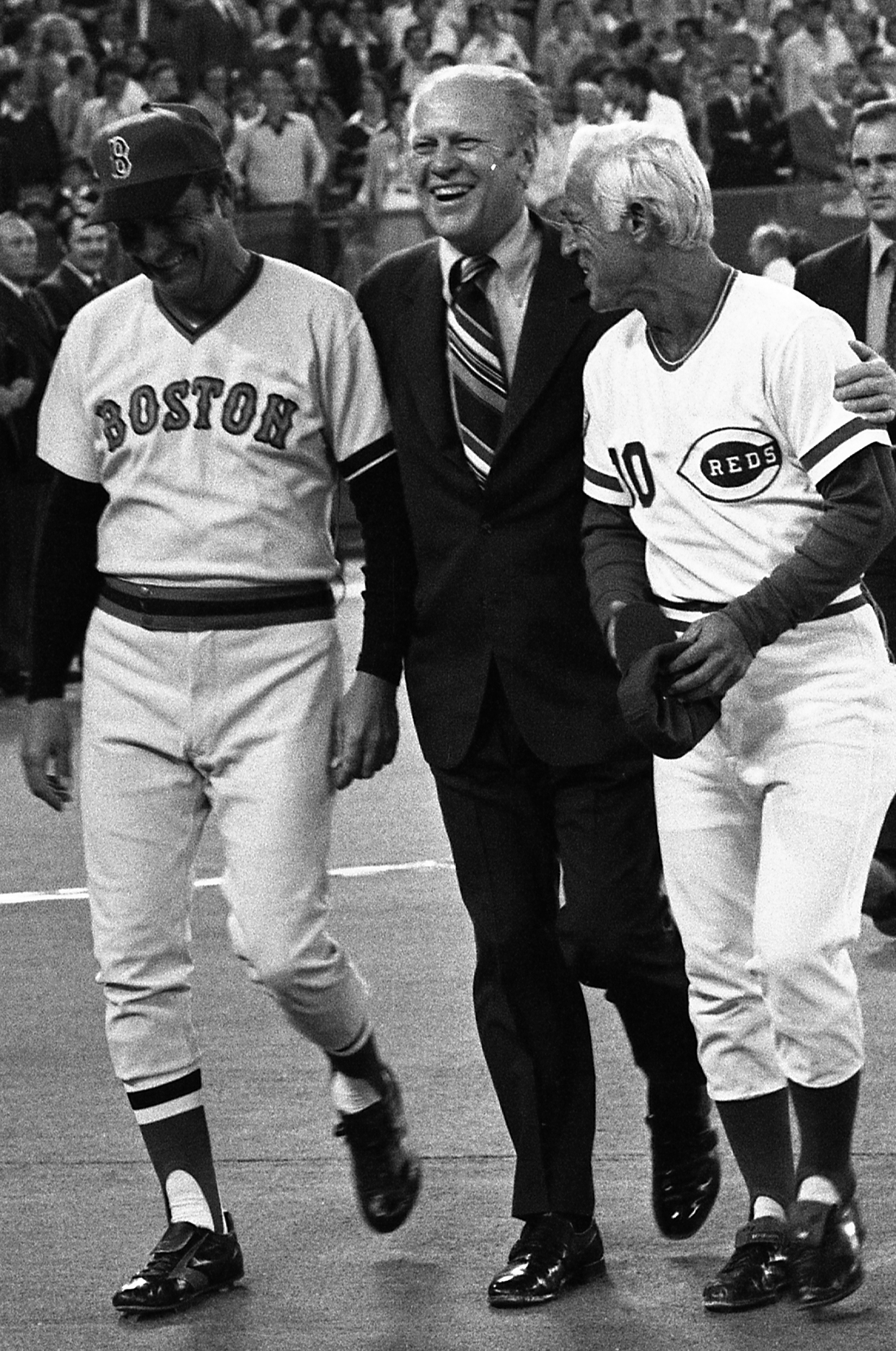
Johnson (left) with President Gerald Ford and Sparky Anderson in 1975

As a big-league manager, Johnson led three different teams over eight seasons. His career began when he succeeded Eddie Kasko following the conclusion of the Red Sox's 1973 campaign on September 30. His biggest success came during his Red Sox posting when he compiled a win–loss record of 220–188 for a .539 winning percentage. He guided Boston to a 95–65 (.594) mark in 1975 and a first-place finish in the AL East. The Sox then swept the three-time defending world champion Oakland Athletics in the playoffs, 3–0, to win the American League pennant. But they lost to the Cincinnati "Big Red Machine" in the thrilling 1975 World Series, four games to three. In an interview conducted by Tim Russert on CNBC in 2003, Baseball Hall of Fame catcher Carlton Fisk named Johnson as the biggest influence in his professional life. Johnson also had his detractors, such as Bill Lee, who stated that the team won "despite our manager", who did not communicate well with his players and even had his pitching coach stationed in the Red Sox bullpen rather than the dugout during the 1975 Series.

In 1976, Boston started poorly, losing 15 of its first 21 games, then rallied and finally climbed above the .500 mark on July 6 (38–37). As the incumbent pennant-winning manager, Johnson managed the 1976 American League All-Star team (with his team losing 7–1 at Veterans Stadium on July 13). But by then the Red Sox were mired in another slump, and only five days later on July 19, Johnson was fired in favor of third-base coach Don Zimmer after the team had lost eight of its last 11 games. At the time of his dismissal, Boston was out of contention with a 41–45 record, in fifth place and 13 games behind the Yankees. Johnson then briefly returned to scouting for the Red Sox.

Johnson was hired to become the first-ever manager of the expansion Seattle Mariners on September 3, 1976. Lou Gorman, Seattle's director of baseball operations, stated that Johnson would also assist in scouting players for the upcoming expansion draft. Johnson said that he was looking for players with "pride, aggressiveness, and the right mental attitude." With the Mariners at 39–65 and tied for last place in the American League West, he was fired on 4 August 1980 and replaced by Maury Wills. His record in 3 2/3 seasons in Seattle was 226–362 (.384).

Johnson then worked as third-base coach for the Texas Rangers, under Zimmer, starting in 1981 before taking over as interim manager on July 30, 1982. Six years earlier, the roles had been reversed when third-base coach Zimmer succeeded Johnson as manager in Boston on July 18, 1976. In his final managerial role, Johnson's Rangers went 26–40 (.394) in the 1982 season's final two months. He finished with a 472–590 record for a .444 career percentage as a Major League manager.

He then moved to the New York Mets as minor league coordinator of instruction and a longtime scout. He also served as the Mets' bench coach on the staff of Dallas Green from May 20, 1993, through the end of that season.

Johnson died from leukemia at the age of 75 in 2004 in Fairfield, California.

=== Managerial record ===
Team	Year	Regular season					Postseason			
Team	Year	Games	Won	Lost	Win %	Finish	Won	Lost	Win %	Result
BOS	1974	162	84	78	.519	3rd in AL East	–	–	–	–
BOS	1975	160	95	65	.594	1st in AL East	6	4	.600	Lost World Series (CIN)
BOS	1976	86	41	45	.477	fired	–	–	–	–
BOS total		408	220	188	.539		6	4	.600	
SEA	1977	162	64	98	.395	6th in AL West	–	–	–	–
SEA	1978	160	56	104	.350	7th in AL West	–	–	–	–
SEA	1979	162	67	95	.414	6th in AL West	–	–	–	–
SEA	1980	104	39	65	.375	fired	–	–	–	–
SEA total		588	226	362	.384		0	0	–	
TEX	1982	56	23	33	.411	6th in AL West	–	–	–	–
TEX total		66	26	40	.394		0	0	–	
Total		1062	472	590	.444		6	4	.600	

== See also ==
- List of St. Louis Cardinals coaches

Sporting positions
Preceded by Clyde King	Rochester Red Wings manager 1963–1965	Succeeded by Earl Weaver
Preceded by Earl Weaver	Elmira Pioneers manager 1966	Succeeded by Billy DeMars
Preceded by Sal Maglie	Boston Red Sox pitching coach 1968–1969	Succeeded by Charlie Wagner
Preceded by Billy Gardner	Louisville Colonels manager 1971–1972	Succeeded by Franchise relocated
Preceded by AAA franchise established	Pawtucket Red Sox manager 1973	Succeeded by Joe Morgan
Preceded by Frank Lucchesi	Texas Rangers third-base coach 1981–1982	Succeeded by Wayne Terwilliger
