= Gary Wheelock =

American baseball player (born 1951)

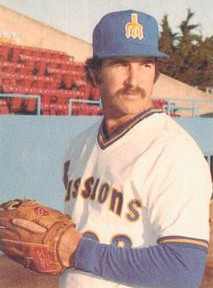
- Wheelock with the San Jose Missions in 1978
- Pitcher
- Born: November 29, 1951 (age 74); Bakersfield, California, U.S.
- Batted: Right Threw: Right

MLB debut
- September 17, 1976, for the California Angels

Last MLB appearance
- April 18, 1980, for the Seattle Mariners

MLB statistics
- Win–loss record: 6–9
- Earned run average: 5.40
- Strikeouts: 50
- Stats at Baseball Reference

Teams
- California Angels (1976); Seattle Mariners (1977, 1980)

Gary Richard Wheelock (born November 29, 1951) is an American former Major League Baseball (MLB) pitcher for the California Angels (1976) and Seattle Mariners (1977 and 1980).

Wheelock attended Troy High School in Fullerton, California. He attended college at Fullerton Junior College then University of California, Irvine, where he played college baseball for the Anteaters from 1972–1974. He had a 17–2 record in 1974. He was inducted into the school's athletics hall of fame in 1984.

The Angels drafted Wheelock in the sixth round of the 1974 MLB draft. He made his MLB debut as a September call-up in 1976. He was the third pick in the 1976 expansion draft and the first-ever player who signed with the Mariners. He won his first MLB game on April 9, 1977, the franchise's second win, then threw the franchise's first complete game on April 19. He pitched in a career-high 17 MLB games for the inaugural Mariners team, going 6–9. However, he had elbow surgery that September. He returned to the majors for one start in 1980. He ended his playing career in the minors in the Los Angeles Dodgers system in 1981.

After his playing career, he spent 33 seasons coaching in the Mariners' organization. He later coached youth baseball in New Zealand.
