= Leroy Stanton =

American baseball player (1946–2019)

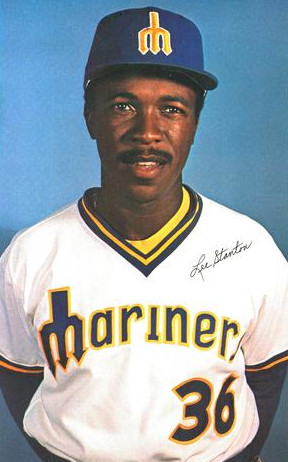
- Stanton in 1978
- Right fielder
- Born: April 10, 1946; Latta, South Carolina, U.S.
- Died: March 13, 2019 (aged 72); Florence County, South Carolina, U.S.
- Batted: Right Threw: Right

Professional debut
- MLB: September 10, 1970, for the New York Mets
- NPB: April 14, 1979, for the Hanshin Tigers

Last appearance
- MLB: September 30, 1978, for the Seattle Mariners
- NPB: October 16, 1979, for the Hanshin Tigers

MLB statistics
- Batting average: .244
- Home runs: 77
- Runs batted in: 358

NPB statistics
- Batting average: .225
- Home runs: 23
- Runs batted in: 58
- Stats at Baseball Reference

Teams
- New York Mets (1970–1971); California Angels (1972–1976); Seattle Mariners (1977–1978); Hanshin Tigers (1979)

Leroy Bobby Stanton (April 10, 1946 – March 13, 2019) was an American Major League Baseball outfielder. He played all or part of nine seasons in the majors, from 1970 to 1978. He played for the New York Mets, California Angels, and the Seattle Mariners. He also played one season in Japan for the Hanshin Tigers in 1979. He died in a car crash on March 13, 2019.

== Professional career ==
=== New York Mets ===
Stanton played two seasons with the Mets. In limited playing time he had five hits in 25 at bats with two RBIs, one double and one triple.

On December 10, 1971, Stanton was traded by the Mets with Francisco Estrada, Don Rose, and Nolan Ryan to the California Angels for Jim Fregosi, considered to be one of the worst trades the Mets have ever made.

=== California Angels ===
Stanton hit three home runs in a July 10, 1973, game against the Baltimore Orioles to tie an Angels record. He led California with 14 home runs and 82 RBIs in 1975.

Halos Heaven, a Los Angeles Angels blog, ranked Stanton as the 68th best Angel in franchise history saying; "Stanton saw a lot of action as an Angel, never truly excelling into greatness, never swooning into uselessness. That is why he and his 594 games under the Halo stand at number 68."

In five seasons with the Angels Stanton played 594 games with 443 hits, 47 home runs and 242 RBIs. He lost his starting job in right field to Bobby Bonds at the start of the 1976 season after Bonds was acquired from the New York Yankees for Mickey Rivers.

=== Seattle Mariners ===
Stanton was selected by the Mariners in the 1976 Major League Baseball expansion draft. In 1977, Stanton hit a career-high 27 home runs for the Mariners.

In two seasons with the M's, Stanton played 226 games, acquiring 180 hits, 30 home runs and 114 RBIs.
