= Carlos López (baseball) =

Mexican baseball player (born 1948)

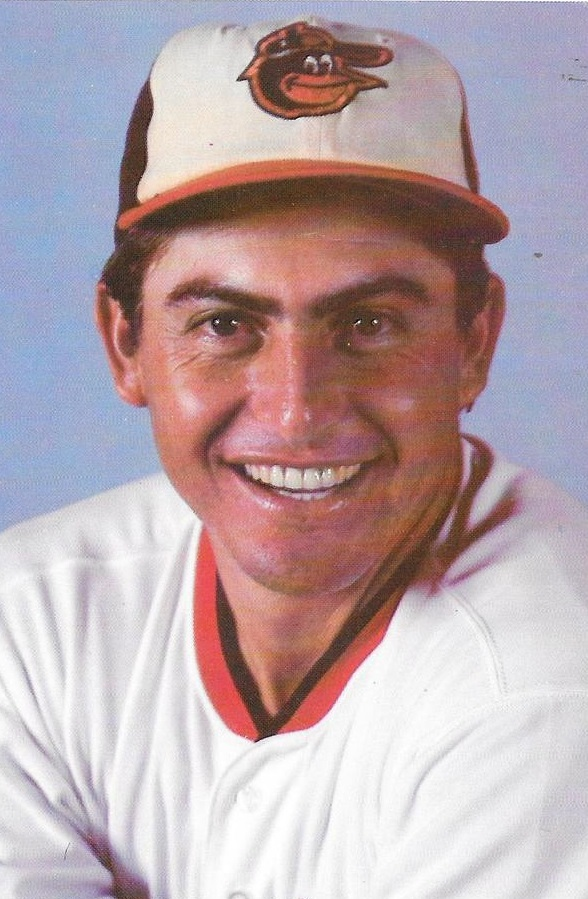
- Outfielder
- Born: September 27, 1948 (age 77); Mazatlán, Sinaloa, Mexico
- Batted: Right Threw: Right

MLB debut
- September 17, 1976, for the California Angels

Last MLB appearance
- October 1, 1978, for the Baltimore Orioles

MLB statistics
- Batting average: .260
- Home runs: 12
- Runs batted in: 54
- Stats at Baseball Reference

Teams
- California Angels (1976); Seattle Mariners (1977); Baltimore Orioles (1978)

Carlos Antonio Morales López (born September 27, 1948) is a Mexican former professional baseball player. Nicknamed "Chaflán" in his native Mexico, López spent seven seasons in professional baseball, including three seasons in Major League Baseball with the California Angels (1976), Seattle Mariners (1977), and the Baltimore Orioles (1978). Over his major league career, López batted .260 with 61 runs, 130 hits, 24 doubles, one triples, 12 home runs, 54 runs batted in (RBIs), and 23 stolen bases in 237 games played. On the defensive side, López has played 181 games in right field and 49 games in center field.

López began his professional career in 1969 with the minor league Class-A Aguascalientes Tigres of the Mexican Center League. Later that season, he played for the Triple-A Mexico City Tigres of the Mexican League. López was purchased from the Tigers by the California Angels from the Tigres in 1973. He then played for the Double-A El Paso Diablos (1974–1975) Triple-A Salt Lake City Gulls (1975–1976) in the California organization; and the Triple-A Rochester Red Wings (1979) in the Baltimore Orioles organization. Over his minor league career in the United States, López batted .316 with 511 hits, 72 doubles, 31 triples, and 39 home runs. In all but one game where he played first base, López played in the outfield.

== Professional career ==
=== Early career ===
In 1969, López began his professional career in the Mexican Center League. With the non-affiliated Class-A Aguascalientes Tigres, a team based in Aguascalientes, Mexico, he played 116 games. López also played with the non-affiliated Triple-A Mexico City Tigres in the Mexican League. He played six games with Mexico City that season. Until 1973, López played with Mexico City, although statistics were not kept.

=== California Angels ===
The California Angels purchased López from the Mexico City club from the Mexican League on December 3, 1973. He started his career in the United States with the Double-A El Paso Diablos of the Texas League in 1974. With the Diablos, López batted .295 with 136 hits, 21 doubles, seven triples, and 14 home runs in 128 games. In 1975, López split the season with the Double-A El Paso Diablos and the Triple-A Salt Lake City Gulls. With the Diablos, he batted .327 with 77 runs, 140 hits, 22 doubles, 10 triples, nine home runs, 78 runs batted in (RBIs), and 11 stolen bases in 112 games. López was first in the Texas League in triples, and fifth in the league in hits. That season, he also played 15 games with the Triple-A Gulls and batted .250 with three runs, 12 hits, two doubles, one home run, five RBIs, and two stolen bases. López spent the 1976 season with the Triple-A Salt Lake City Gulls, and later made the California Angels' roster as a September call-up. With the Gulls, he batted .350 with 95 runs, 157 hits, 19 doubles, 12 triples, nine home runs, 88 RBIs, and 30 stolen bases in 123 games. López was tied for second in the Pacific Coast League in triples, and was third in batting average. López made his major league debut that season against the Minnesota Twins on September 17. In that games, López walked in his one plate appearance. On the season, López went hitless with one run and two stolen bases in nine games in the majors.

=== Seattle Mariners ===
López was selected by the Seattle Mariners in the 1976 Major League Baseball expansion draft. At the age of 26, it was noted by The Associated Press that López and teammate Dick Pole were "the old men" on the Mariners' roster. The Associated Press also noted that fellow players and managers "rave" about López's speed, but also asserted that he had a throwing arm that was as good. He got his first major league hit against the California Angels on April 10. López hit his first major league home run against the Boston Red Sox on May 3. On May 30, López hit two home runs in the same game against the Texas Rangers. On the season, López batted .283 with 39 runs, 84 hits, 18 doubles, one triple, eight home runs, 34 RBIs, and 16 stolen bases in 99 games.

=== Baltimore Orioles ===
López was traded along with Tommy Moore from the Mariners to the Baltimore Orioles for Mike Parrott at the Winter Meetings on December 7, 1977. In 1978, López spent the entire season with the Orioles. He batted .238 with 21 runs, 46 hits, six doubles, four home runs, 20 RBIs, five stolen bases, and seven caught stealing in 129 games. López was demoted to the Triple-A Rochester Red Wings in 1979, his final professional season. With the Red Wings, he batted .282 with 38 runs, 66 hits, 10 doubles, two triples, six home runs, 30 RBIs, and 24 stolen bases in 62 games. López led the International League in stolen bases and caught stealing (7).
