= Tom Brown (pitcher) =

American baseball player

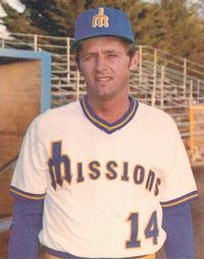
- Brown with the Mariners in 1978
- Pitcher/pitching coach
- Born: August 10, 1949 (age 76); Lafayette, Louisiana
- Batted: Right Threw: Right

MLB debut
- September 14, 1978, for the Seattle Mariners

Last MLB appearance
- October 1, 1978, for the Seattle Mariners

MLB statistics
- Win–loss record: 0–0
- Earned run average: 4.15
- Strikeouts: 8
- Stats at Baseball Reference

Teams
- Seattle Mariners (1978)

Thomas Dale Brown (born August 10, 1949) is an American former Major League Baseball pitcher who played in six games for the Seattle Mariners in 1978. He became a pitching coach after ending his playing career.

== Playing career ==
Brown attended Neville High School in Monroe, Louisiana and Northeast Louisiana University. In four years playing for the school's baseball team, he set program records for wins, earned run average (ERA), and shutouts. In 1971, he was an All-American and led the country with a 0.51 ERA.

The Kansas City Royals signed Brown as an undrafted free agent in 1971 but released him after a partial season with the Kingsport Royals.

After several years out of baseball, working as a teacher and coach, Brown pitched for the independent Baton Rouge Cougars in 1976. He signed with the Houston Astros for the following season, pitching in Double-A.

Brown signed with the Mariners on May 15, 1977. He began the 1978 season with the Triple-A San Jose Missions. He was a September call-up, pitching in six games for Seattle. The Mariners released him during spring training in 1979. Brown never returned to the majors, pitching in the minors for three more seasons.

Brown was inducted into the Northeast Louisiana University Athletics Hall of Fame in 1980. In 2014, Louisiana–Monroe, the university's new name, retired Brown's number.

== Coaching career ==
Brown was an assistant coach for the LSU Tigers from 1985 to 1987. In 1989, he became a pitching coach for three seasons in the Baltimore Orioles farm system. Starting in 1995, he was the pitching coach for the Texas Rangers' Triple-A affiliate in Oklahoma City for four seasons. He joined the San Diego Padres organization in 1999, first as a pitching coach then as a minor league pitching coordinator, returning to a coaching role in 2003. He coached in the San Francisco Giants organization in 2005, followed by the Miami Marlins in 2006. He joined the Cincinnati Reds organization in 2007, working as a pitching coach at High-A and Double-A through the 2020 season.

== Personal life ==
Brown is married. His son, Todd, was a baseball outfielder, playing in college and for two seasons in the Baltimore Orioles minor league system.
