= Steve Burke (baseball) =

American baseball player

- Pitcher
- Born: March 5, 1955 (age 70); Stockton, California, USA
- Batted: Switch Threw: Right

MLB debut
- September 10, 1977, for the Seattle Mariners

Last MLB appearance
- June 2, 1978, for the Seattle Mariners

MLB statistics
- Win–loss record: 0–2
- Earned run average: 3.34
- Strikeouts: 22
- Stats at Baseball Reference

Teams
- Seattle Mariners (1977–1978)

Steven Michael Burke (born March 5, 1955) is a former Major League Baseball pitcher who played for the Seattle Mariners in 1977 and 1978.

Burke attended Tokay High School in Lodi, California, where he played baseball and was a football quarterback, and Merritt College. The Boston Red Sox drafted Burke in the second round of the January phase of the 1974 MLB draft. He signed for a $10,000 signing bonus. After three seasons in Single-A, the Mariners chose Burke in the 1976 expansion draft. He began the team's inaugural season in Double-A and was named to the Southern League All-Star team. He was a September call-up, pitching in 6 games in relief. He had one loss and a 2.87 ERA. He began the 1978 season in Seattle's bullpen but was demoted in June. Manager Darrell Johnson said at the time that Burke would return and "he is going to be one helluva reliever for many years." However, Burke never pitched in the majors again. He played in Triple-A in 1979, pitching in an exhibition game against the Mariners in May. He ended his professional career in the Mexican League in 1980, playing for Tecolotes de Nuevo Laredo and Tigres Capitalinos.
