= Glenn Abbott =

American baseball player and coach (born 1951)

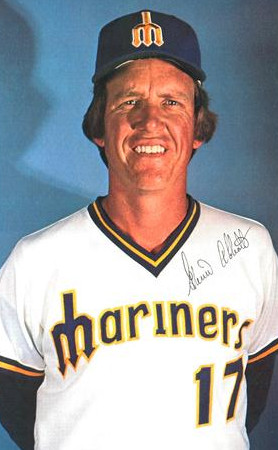
- Abbott in 1978
- Pitcher
- Born: February 16, 1951 (age 75); Little Rock, Arkansas, U.S.
- Batted: Right Threw: Right

MLB debut
- July 29, 1973, for the Oakland Athletics

Last MLB appearance
- August 8, 1984, for the Detroit Tigers

MLB statistics
- Win–loss record: 62–83
- Earned run average: 4.39
- Strikeouts: 484
- Stats at Baseball Reference

Teams
- Oakland Athletics (1973–1976); Seattle Mariners (1977–1981, 1983); Detroit Tigers (1983–1984)

Career highlights and awards
- Pitched a combined no-hitter on September 28, 1975

William Glenn Abbott (born February 16, 1951) is an American former Major League Baseball (MLB) pitcher and minor league pitching coach. During an 11-year baseball career, he pitched for the Oakland Athletics (1973–76), Seattle Mariners (1977–81; 1983), and Detroit Tigers (1983–84). Abbott, along with Vida Blue, Paul Lindblad and Rollie Fingers, combined for the first four-pitcher combined no-hitter in MLB history.

== Early life ==
Abbott was born in Little Rock, Arkansas. He played baseball and basketball at North Little Rock High School and had planned to continue with both sports in college. However, he was drafted out of high school and signed immediately.

== Professional career ==
=== Oakland Athletics ===
Abbott was drafted by the Oakland Athletics in the eighth round of the 1969 MLB draft. He made his MLB debut in July 1973.

On September 28, 1975, Abbott pitched one inning of a no-hitter over the California Angels on the last day of the regular season, relieving Vida Blue, who threw the first five innings. Abbott retired Ike Hampton, Jerry Remy and Dave Chalk in order in the sixth inning before being replaced by Paul Lindblad and later Rollie Fingers. This was the first four-pitcher combined no-hitter in MLB history. Abbott pitched four seasons with the Athletics going 13−16 with a 4.08 ERA in 73 games, 45 of them starts.

=== Seattle Mariners ===
In November 1976, the Seattle Mariners selected Abbott in the 1976 MLB expansion draft. He played for the Mariners longer than any other player from their original 1977 Opening Day roster. Abbott said this about being chosen by the Mariners:

Wes Stock, my pitching coach in Oakland, had gone up there, and I was excited about going to a new ballclub, but I never dreamed the team would be so crummy. I went from an A's team that had won three straight World Series with still quite a few veterans on it, to a team of young guys who didn't know what they could do.

Abbott led all Mariners pitchers in wins in 1977 and 1980, winning 12 games in each season. Abbott was the Mariners' Opening Day starting pitcher in 1978, 1979, and 1981. Mariners announcer Dave Niehaus nicknamed Abbott the "Tall Arkansan".

Abbott finished his tenure with the Mariners going 44−62 with a 4.54 ERA in 155 games, 146 of them starts. He was the franchise leader in wins, losses, innings pitched, and starts through the 1984 season.

=== Detroit Tigers ===
On August 23, 1983, Abbott's contract was purchased by the Detroit Tigers from the Mariners for $100,000. In parts of two seasons with the Tigers, Abbott was 2−2 with a 3.87 ERA in 20 games, 15 of them starts, before his release on August 14, 1984.

== Coaching career ==
Abbott has had a long career with many different stops as a minor league pitching coach, primarily in the New York Mets, Oakland Athletics, and San Diego Padres systems. Listed below are the team's he coached:

- 1985: Little Falls Mets
- 1986–1987: Jackson Mets
- 1990, 1993–1996: Huntsville Stars
- 1991–1992: Tacoma Tigers
- 1997–1998: Visalia A's
- 1999: Midland RockHounds
- 2000–2002: Modesto A's
- 2003–2004: Oklahoma RedHawks
- 2005: Spokane Indians
- 2006: Mobile BayBears
- 2007, 2010: San Antonio Missions
- 2008–2009: Portland Beavers
- 2011: Savannah Sand Gnats
- 2012–2016: Binghamton Mets
- 2017: Binghamton Rumble Ponies
- 2018: Las Vegas 51s
- 2019: Syracuse Mets
- 2020: Kingsport Mets (season cancelled)

== Personal life ==
Abbott and his wife have three children and 10 grandchildren. He attended State College of Arkansas. He coached his oldest son with Visalia in 1997. Another son was also a baseball pitcher.

Preceded by Ed Halicki	No-hit game September 28, 1975 (with Vida Blue, Paul Lindblad and Rollie Fingers)	Succeeded by Larry Dierker
Preceded by Diego Seguí; Mike Parrott	Opening Day starting pitcher for the Seattle Mariners; 1978–1979; 1981	Succeeded by Mike Parrott; Floyd Bannister
