= Steve Braun (baseball) =

American baseball player (born 1948)

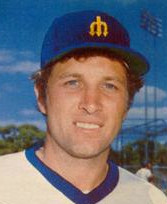
- Left fielder / Third baseman
- Born: May 8, 1948 (age 78); Trenton, New Jersey, U.S.
- Batted: Left Threw: Right

MLB debut
- April 6, 1971, for the Minnesota Twins

Last MLB appearance
- October 6, 1985, for the St. Louis Cardinals

MLB statistics
- Batting average: .271
- Home runs: 52
- Runs batted in: 388
- Stats at Baseball Reference

Teams
- Minnesota Twins (1971–1976); Seattle Mariners (1977–1978); Kansas City Royals (1978–1980); Toronto Blue Jays (1980); St. Louis Cardinals (1981–1985)

Career highlights and awards
- World Series champion (1982)

Stephen Russell Braun (born May 8, 1948) is an American former professional baseball left fielder, third baseman, and designated hitter. He played in Major League Baseball (MLB) for the Minnesota Twins, Seattle Mariners, Kansas City Royals, Toronto Blue Jays, and St. Louis Cardinals.

Braun played high school baseball at Hopewell Valley Central High School.

== Career ==
The Twins selected Braun in the 10th round of the 1966 Major League Baseball draft. He did not play baseball in 1968 or 1969 as he was on baseball's military list from September 6, 1967, until September 23, 1969. Braun made his MLB debut with Minnesota on April 6, 1971. He appeared in his final regular season game on October 6, 1985.

Braun was traded from the Mariners to the Royals for Jim Colborn on May 31, 1978. He was a member of the St. Louis Cardinals team that defeated the Milwaukee Brewers in the 1982 World Series.

He is one of the few players with over 100 pinch hits.

In 1425 games over 15 seasons, Braun compiled a .271 batting average with 466 runs, 155 doubles, 19 triples, 52 home runs, 388 RBI, 579 base on balls, 433 strikeouts, .371 on-base percentage, and .367 slugging percentage. Defensively, he recorded a .960 fielding percentage.

After his playing career, Braun became a hitting coach, working with the Cardinals' staff in 1990 and then spending 12 years (1991–2002) as a minor league coach and hitting coordinator for the Boston Red Sox.
