= José Báez (baseball) =

Dominican baseball player (born 1953)

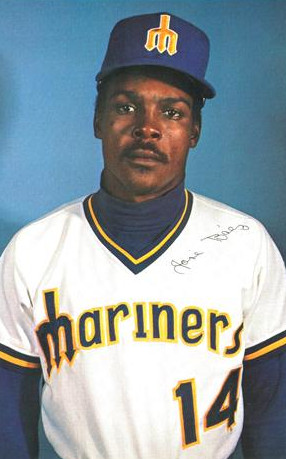
- Báez in 1978
- Second baseman
- Born: December 31, 1953 (age 72); San Cristóbal, Dominican Republic
- Batted: Right Threw: Right

MLB debut
- April 6, 1977, for the Seattle Mariners

Last MLB appearance
- June 6, 1978, for the Seattle Mariners

MLB statistics
- Batting average: .245
- Home runs: 1
- Runs batted in: 19
- Stats at Baseball Reference

Teams
- Seattle Mariners (1977–1978)

José Antonio Mota Báez (born December 31, 1953) is a Dominican former Major League Baseball player.

== Professional career ==
=== Los Angeles Dodgers ===
Báez was signed by the Los Angeles Dodgers in 1972 as an amateur free agent.

=== Seattle Mariners ===
Báez was purchased from the Dodgers by the Seattle Mariners in 1976. He was the favorite for the second basemen spot going into the 1977 spring training.

In his debut on April 6, 1977 against the California Angels, Báez delivered the first hit in Mariners history. He finished the '77 season batting .259 with 79 hits, one home run, 14 doubles and 17 RBIs in 91 games.

With the Mariners in 1978 he hit .160 in 50 at bats.

=== St. Louis Cardinals ===
Báez was later traded to the St. Louis Cardinals for a player to be named later (eventually revealed to be Mike Potter). Báez spent the rest of the 1978 season with the Triple-A Springfield Redbirds.

He did not play another major league game before being released in 1979.

== Personal life ==
He is the cousin of former Major League players Andy Mota, José Mota, and Manny Mota.
