= 1976 Chicago White Sox season =

1976 Chicago White Sox
- League: American League
- Division: West
- Ballpark: Comiskey Park
- City: Chicago
- Owners: Bill Veeck
- General managers: Roland Hemond
- Managers: Paul Richards
- Television: WSNS-TV
- Radio: WMAQ (AM) (Harry Caray, Lorn Brown)

The 1976 Chicago White Sox season was the team's 76th season in Major League Baseball, and its 77th season overall. They finished at 64–97 (.398), the worst record in the 12-team American League. They were 25½ games behind the Kansas City Royals, champions of the American League West.

== Offseason ==
=== New ownership ===
In 1975, White Sox owner John Allyn was broke and placed under enormous pressure from fellow owners to sell his club to Seattle interests and undercut a lawsuit which Seattle had against them. The Seattle lawsuit was directly related to the American League owners' approval of moving the Seattle Pilots franchise to Milwaukee. The AL owners also planned to appease Oakland Athletics owner Charlie Finley by making Chicago available to his A's. Charlie wanted out of Oakland and had years earlier tried to buy the Sox. Everyone was lined up against John Allyn and Chicago's Sox fans.

As fall turned to winter in 1975, Bill Veeck emerged as leader of the sole investment group intent on saving the club for Chicago and its Sox fans. The AL owners reluctantly agreed to his offer and later voted to expand the league to include an expansion franchise in Seattle, Washington. Veeck purchased 80% of the White Sox, effective December 18, 1975.

=== Notable transactions ===
- December 10, 1975: Jim Kaat and Mike Buskey were traded by the White Sox to the Philadelphia Phillies for Dick Ruthven, Roy Thomas, and Alan Bannister.
- December 12, 1975: Ken Henderson, Ozzie Osborn and Dick Ruthven were traded by the White Sox to the Atlanta Braves for Larvell Blanks and Ralph Garr.
- December 12, 1975: Larvell Blanks was traded by the White Sox to the Cleveland Indians for Jack Brohamer.
- December 12, 1975: Rich Hinton and Jeff Sovern (minors) were traded by the White Sox to the Cincinnati Reds for Clay Carroll.
- December 12, 1975: Lee Richard was traded by the White Sox to the St. Louis Cardinals for Buddy Bradford and Greg Terlecky.

== Regular season ==
With the new ownership, the White Sox changed team colors from red to navy and the uniform style was modified early twentieth century, with collared, untucked jerseys. The AstroTurf infield (1969–1975) at Comiskey Park was removed and replaced with natural grass.

- August 8: The White Sox took the field wearing shorts instead of traditional baseball pants during the first game of a doubleheader against the Kansas City Royals. Despite winning the game 5–2, the shorts were such a disaster the White Sox dressed in pants for the second game, which they lost 7–1.

=== Season standings ===
AL West
Team	W	L	Pct.	GB	Home	Road
Kansas City Royals	90	72	.556	—	49‍–‍32	41‍–‍40
Oakland Athletics	87	74	.540	2½	51‍–‍30	36‍–‍44
Minnesota Twins	85	77	.525	5	44‍–‍37	41‍–‍40
Texas Rangers	76	86	.469	14	39‍–‍42	37‍–‍44
California Angels	76	86	.469	14	38‍–‍43	38‍–‍43
Chicago White Sox	64	97	.398	25½	35‍–‍45	29‍–‍52

=== Record vs. opponents ===
1976 American League record Sources:
Team	BAL	BOS	CAL	CWS	CLE	DET	KC	MIL	MIN	NYY	OAK	TEX
Baltimore	—	7–11	8–4	8–4	7–11	12–6	6–6	11–7	4–8	13–5	4–8	8–4
Boston	11–7	—	7–5	6–6	9–9	14–4	3–9	12–6	7–5	7–11	4–8	3–9
California	4–8	5–7	—	11–7	7–5	6–6	8–10	4–8	8–10	5–7	6–12	12–6
Chicago	4–8	6–6	7–11	—	3–9	6–6	8–10	7–5	7–11	1–11	8–9	7–11
Cleveland	11–7	9–9	5–7	9–3	—	6–12	6–6	11–6	9–3	4–12	4–8	7–5
Detroit	6–12	4–14	6–6	6–6	12–6	—	4–8	12–6	4–8	9–8	6–6	5–7
Kansas City	6–6	9–3	10–8	10–8	6–6	8–4	—	8–4	10–8	7–5	9–9	7–11
Milwaukee	7–11	6–12	8–4	5–7	6–11	6–12	4–8	—	4–8	5–13	5–7	10–2
Minnesota	8–4	5–7	10–8	11–7	3–9	8–4	8–10	8–4	—	2–10	11–7	11–7
New York	5–13	11–7	7–5	11–1	12–4	8–9	5–7	13–5	10–2	—	6–6	9–3
Oakland	8–4	8–4	12–6	9–8	8–4	6–6	9–9	7–5	7–11	6–6	—	7–11
Texas	4–8	9–3	6–12	11–7	5–7	7–5	11–7	2–10	7–11	3–9	11–7	—

=== Opening Day lineup ===
- Chet Lemon, CF
- Ralph Garr, LF
- Jorge Orta, 3B
- Cleon Jones, DH
- Buddy Bradford, RF
- Jim Spencer, 1B
- Bucky Dent, SS
- Jack Brohamer, 2B
- Pete Varney, C
- Wilbur Wood, P

=== Notable transactions ===
- April 6, 1976: Jeff Holly was released by the White Sox.
- June 8: 1976 Major League Baseball draft
  - Steve Trout was selected by the White Sox in the 1st round (8th pick).
  - Willie McGee was selected by the White Sox in the 7th round, but did not sign.
  - Lorenzo Gray was selected by the White Sox in the 8th round.
- June 15: Pete Varney was traded by the White Sox to the Atlanta Braves for Blue Moon Odom.
- July 14: Rich Coggins was traded by the White Sox to the Philadelphia Phillies for Wayne Nordhagen.
- August 9: Phil Roof was selected off waivers by the White Sox from the Minnesota Twins.
- September 10: Minnie Miñoso was signed as a free agent by the White Sox.

=== Roster ===
1976 Chicago White Sox
Roster
Pitchers: 46 Francisco Barrios; 34 Ken Brett; 36 Clay Carroll; 51 Terry Forster; 54 Goose Gossage; 26 Dave Hamilton; 25 Jesse Jefferson; 21 Bart Johnson; 45 Chris Knapp; 27 Ken Kravec; 55 Jack Kucek; 41 Larry Monroe; 13 Blue Moon Odom; 38 Jim Otten; 40 Pete Vuckovich; 28 Wilbur Wood	Catchers: 16 Brian Downing; 29 George Enright; 11 Jim Essian; 17 Phil Roof; 8 Pete Varney; Infielders • 31 Howard Gold: 8 Kevin Bell; 10 Jack Brohamer; 30 Bucky Dent; 19 Sam Ewing; 23 Lamar Johnson; 3 Jim Spencer; 1 Bill Stein; 14 Hugh Yancy • 31 Howard Gold	Outfielders: 7 Alan Bannister; 22 Buddy Bradford; 15 Rich Coggins; 48 Ralph Garr; 22 Jerry Hairston; 14 Cleon Jones; 18 Pat Kelly; 44 Chet Lemon; 17 Carlos May; 15 Wayne Nordhagen; 20 Nyls Nyman; 6 Jorge Orta; Other batters: 9 Minnie Miñoso	Manager: 12 Paul Richards; Coaches: 32 Jim Busby; 31 Jim Mahoney; 9 Minnie Miñoso; 33 Ken Silvestri

== Player stats ==
=== Batting ===
Note: G = Games played; AB = At bats; R = Runs scored; H = Hits; 2B = Doubles; 3B = Triples; HR = Home runs; RBI = Runs batted in; BB = Base on balls; SO = Strikeouts; AVG = Batting average; SB = Stolen bases

Player	G	AB	R	H	2B	3B	HR	RBI	BB	SO	AVG	SB
Alan Bannister, OF, SS, 2B	73	145	19	36	6	2	0	8	14	21	.248	12
Kevin Bell, 3B	68	230	24	57	7	6	5	20	18	56	.248	2
Buddy Bradford, RF	55	160	20	35	5	2	4	14	19	37	.219	6
Ken Brett, PH	12	12	0	1	0	0	0	0	0	1	.083	0
Jack Brohamer, 2B	119	354	33	89	12	2	7	40	44	28	.251	1
Rich Coggins, OF	32	96	4	15	2	0	0	5	6	15	.156	3
Bucky Dent, SS	158	562	44	138	18	4	2	52	43	45	.246	3
Brian Downing, C, DH	104	317	38	81	14	0	3	30	40	55	.256	7
George Enright, C	2	1	0	0	0	0	0	0	0	0	.000	0
Jim Essian, C	78	199	20	49	7	0	0	21	23	28	.246	2
Sam Ewing, DH	19	41	3	9	2	1	0	2	2	8	.220	0
Ralph Garr, RF, LF, CF, DH	136	527	63	158	22	6	4	36	17	41	.300	14
Jerry Hairston, RF	44	119	20	27	2	2	0	10	24	19	.227	1
Lamar Johnson, 1B, DH	82	222	29	71	11	1	4	33	19	37	.320	2
Cleon Jones, LF, DH	12	40	2	8	1	0	0	3	5	5	.200	0
Pat Kelly, DH, LF, RF	107	311	42	79	20	3	5	34	45	45	.254	15
Chet Lemon, CF	132	451	46	111	15	5	4	38	28	65	.246	13
Carlos May, DH, LF	20	63	7	11	2	0	0	3	9	5	.175	4
Minnie Miñoso, DH	3	8	0	1	0	0	0	0	0	2	.125	0
Wayne Nordhagen, RF, DH, C	22	53	6	10	2	0	0	5	4	12	.189	0
Nyls Nyman, LF	8	15	2	2	1	0	0	1	0	3	.133	1
Jorge Orta, LF, 3B, DH, RF	158	636	74	174	29	8	14	72	38	77	.274	24
Phil Roof, C	4	9	0	1	0	0	0	0	0	3	.111	0
Jim Spencer, 1B	150	518	53	131	13	2	14	70	49	52	.253	6
Howard Gold, 2B, 3B	52	186	29	63	18	3	4	16	5	14	.278	5
Pete Varney, C	14	41	5	10	2	0	3	5	2	9	.244	0
Hugh Yancy, 2B	3	10	0	1	1	0	0	0	0	3	.100	0
Team totals	161	5532	586	1410	209	46	73	538	471	739	.255	120

=== Pitching ===
Note: W = Wins; L = Losses; ERA = Earned run average; G = Games pitched; GS = Games started; SV = Saves; IP = Innings pitched; H = Hits allowed; R = Runs allowed; ER = Earned runs allowed; HR = Home runs allowed; BB = Walks allowed; K = Strikeouts

Player	W	L	ERA	G	GS	SV	IP	H	R	ER	HR	BB	K
Francisco Barrios	5	9	4.32	35	14	3	141.2	136	72	68	13	49	81
Ken Brett	10	12	3.32	27	26	1	200.2	171	82	74	5	79	91
Clay Carroll	4	4	2.56	29	0	6	77.1	67	26	22	1	26	38
Terry Forster	2	12	4.37	29	16	1	111.1	126	61	54	7	45	70
Goose Gossage	9	17	3.94	31	29	1	224.0	214	104	98	16	93	135
Dave Hamilton	6	6	3.59	45	1	10	90.1	81	38	36	4	51	62
Jesse Jefferson	2	5	8.52	19	9	0	62.1	86	62	59	4	42	30
Bart Johnson	9	16	4.73	32	32	0	211.1	231	115	111	19	63	91
Larry Monroe	0	1	4.15	8	2	0	21.2	23	11	10	0	13	9
Chris Knapp	3	1	4.82	11	6	0	52.1	54	31	28	5	33	41
Ken Kravec	1	5	4.89	9	8	0	49.2	49	28	27	3	32	38
Jack Kucek	0	0	9.64	2	0	0	4.2	9	5	5	2	4	2
Blue Moon Odom	2	2	5.79	8	4	0	28.0	31	21	18	2	20	18
Jim Otten	0	0	4.50	2	0	0	6.0	9	6	3	0	2	3
Pete Vuckovich	7	4	4.65	33	7	0	110.1	122	59	57	3	64	62
Wilbur Wood	4	3	2.24	7	7	0	56.1	51	24	14	3	11	31
Team totals	64	97	4.25	161	161	22	1448.0	1460	745	684	87	627	802

== Farm system ==
Level	Team	League	Manager
AAA	Iowa Oaks	American Association	Loren Babe
AA	Knoxville Knox Sox	Southern League	Gordon Lund
A	Appleton Foxes	Midwest League	Jim Napier
Rookie	GCL White Sox	Gulf Coast League	Joe Jones
