= 1977 Chicago White Sox season =

1977 Chicago White Sox
- League: American League
- Division: West
- Ballpark: Comiskey Park
- City: Chicago, Illinois
- Owners: Bill Veeck
- General managers: Roland Hemond
- Managers: Bob Lemon
- Television: WSNS-TV
- Radio: WMAQ (AM) (Harry Caray, Lorn Brown, Jimmy Piersall, Mary Shane)

The 1977 Chicago White Sox season in the American League saw the team finish third in the American League West, at 90–72, 12 games behind the Kansas City Royals.

== Offseason ==
White Sox owner Bill Veeck tried a new philosophy during the offseason: figuring that if he could not compete with the bigger spending clubs for free agents, he would "rent" them, even if only for one year. With this strategy in mind, he traded for Richie Zisk (who had one year remaining on his contract) and Oscar Gamble (also in the final year of his contract), hoping that he would be able to continue the practice financially.

=== Notable transactions ===
- October 6, 1976: Minnie Miñoso was released by the White Sox.
- October 21, 1976: Phil Roof was traded by the White Sox to the Toronto Blue Jays for a player to be named later. The Blue Jays completed the deal by sending Larry Anderson to the White Sox on January 5.
- November 26, 1976: Eric Soderholm was signed as a free agent by the White Sox.
- December 5, 1976: Royle Stillman was signed as a free agent by the White Sox.
- December 10, 1976: Goose Gossage and Terry Forster were traded by the White Sox to the Pittsburgh Pirates for Richie Zisk and Silvio Martínez.
- January 11, 1977: Mark Esser was drafted by the White Sox in the 8th round of the 1977 Major League Baseball draft.
- January 26, 1977: Blue Moon Odom was released by the White Sox.
- February 15, 1977: Fritz Peterson was signed as a free agent by the White Sox.

== Regular season ==
On April 7 in Toronto, the White Sox played the Toronto Blue Jays in the first game in Blue Jays history. The White Sox lost 9–5 to the Blue Jays, which resulted in the first win for the Blue Jays in franchise history.

The White Sox, who came to be called the "South Side Hitmen", were in solid contention for most of the season, battling the division-winning Royals and Minnesota Twins most of the way. They moved into first place in the AL West on July 1 and remained there until August 12. Their primary weapon was their power hitting. As a team, the White Sox hit 192 home runs, a record which lasted until 1996. Their displays of power caused fans to cheer for "curtain calls", where players came out of the dugout after hitting a home run to acknowledge those cheers. Some Royals players greatly resented this, and called such behavior "bush" and "unprofessional". The climax of this came on August 5, when White Sox pitcher Bart Johnson and Royals catcher Darrell Porter had a fistfight in a game at Kansas City.

=== Opening Day lineup ===
- Ralph Garr, left field
- Alan Bannister, shortstop
- Jorge Orta, second base
- Richie Zisk, right field
- Jim Spencer, first base
- Oscar Gamble, designated hitter
- Eric Soderholm, third base
- Chet Lemon, center field
- Brian Downing, catcher
- Ken Brett, pitcher

=== Season standings ===
AL West
Team	W	L	Pct.	GB	Home	Road
Kansas City Royals	102	60	.630	—	55‍–‍26	47‍–‍34
Texas Rangers	94	68	.580	8	44‍–‍37	50‍–‍31
Chicago White Sox	90	72	.556	12	48‍–‍33	42‍–‍39
Minnesota Twins	84	77	.522	17½	48‍–‍32	36‍–‍45
California Angels	74	88	.457	28	39‍–‍42	35‍–‍46
Seattle Mariners	64	98	.395	38	29‍–‍52	35‍–‍46
Oakland Athletics	63	98	.391	38½	35‍–‍46	28‍–‍52

=== Record vs. opponents ===
1977 American League record Sources:
Team	BAL	BOS	CAL	CWS	CLE	DET	KC	MIL	MIN	NYY	OAK	SEA	TEX	TOR
Baltimore	—	6–8	5–6	5–5	11–4	12–3	4–7	11–4	6–4	8–7	8–2	7–3	4–6	10–5
Boston	8–6	—	7–3	3–7	8–7	9–6	5–5	9–6	4–6	8–7	8–3	10–1	6–4	12–3
California	6–5	3–7	—	8–7	6–4	4–6	6–9	5–5	7–8	4–7	5–10	9–6	5–10	6–4
Chicago	5–5	7–3	7–8	—	6–4	4–6	8–7	6–5	10–5	3–7	10–5	10–5	6–9	8–3
Cleveland	4–11	7–8	4–6	4–6	—	8–7	3–7	11–4	2–9	3–12	7–3	7–3	2–9	9–5
Detroit	3–12	6–9	6–4	6–4	7–8	—	3–8	10–5	5–5	6–9	5–5	5–6	2–8	10–5
Kansas City	7–4	5–5	9–6	7–8	7–3	8–3	—	8–2	10–5	5–5	9–6	11–4	8–7	8–2
Milwaukee	4–11	6–9	5–5	5–6	4–11	5–10	2–8	—	3–8	8–7	5–5	7–3	5–5	8–7
Minnesota	4–6	6–4	8–7	5–10	9–2	5–5	5–10	8–3	—	2–8	8–6	7–8	8–7	9–1
New York	7–8	7–8	7–4	7–3	12–3	9–6	5–5	7–8	8–2	—	9–2	6–4	7–3	9–6
Oakland	2–8	3–8	10–5	5–10	3–7	5–5	6–9	5–5	6–8	2–9	—	7–8	2–13	7–3
Seattle	3–7	1–10	6–9	5–10	3–7	6–5	4–11	3–7	8–7	4–6	8–7	—	9–6	4–6
Texas	6–4	4–6	10–5	9–6	9–2	8–2	7–8	5–5	7–8	3–7	13–2	6–9	—	7–4
Toronto	5–10	3–12	4–6	3–8	5–9	5–10	2–8	7–8	1–9	6–9	3–7	6–4	4–7	—

=== Notable transactions ===
- April 5, 1977: Bucky Dent was traded by the White Sox to the New York Yankees for Oscar Gamble, LaMarr Hoyt, Bob Polinsky (minors), and $200,000.
- August 20, 1977: Steve Staniland (minors) was traded by the White Sox to the St. Louis Cardinals for Don Kessinger.
- August 31, 1977: The White Sox traded players to be named later to the St. Louis Cardinals for Clay Carroll. The White Sox completed the deal by sending Nyls Nyman to the Cardinals on September 2, and sending Dave Hamilton and Silvio Martínez to the Cardinals on November 28.

=== Roster ===
1977 Chicago White Sox
Roster
Pitchers: 51 Larry Anderson; 46 Francisco Barrios; 34 Ken Brett; 34 Clay Carroll; 43 Bruce Dal Canton; 37 Dave Frost; 26 Dave Hamilton; 24 Bart Johnson; 33 Don Kirkwood; 45 Chris Knapp; 27 Ken Kravec; 55 Jack Kucek; 36 Lerrin LaGrow; 47 Silvio Martínez; 50 Steve Renko; 32 Steve Stone; 51 John Verhoeven; 52 Randy Wiles; 28 Wilbur Wood	Catchers: 16 Brian Downing; 11 Jim Essian; 20 Bill Nahorodny; Infielders: 7 Alan Bannister; 8 Kevin Bell; 10 Jack Brohamer; 1 John Flannery; 23 Lamar Johnson; 30 Don Kessinger; 1 Tim Nordbrook; 6 Jorge Orta; 12 Eric Soderholm; 3 Jim Spencer; 19 Mike Squires	Outfielders: 5 Bob Coluccio; 38 Henry Cruz; 25 Tommy Cruz; 17 Oscar Gamble; 48 Ralph Garr; 25 Jerry Hairston; 44 Chet Lemon; 5 Bob Molinaro; 15 Wayne Nordhagen; 18 Royle Stillman; 22 Richie Zisk; Other batters: 20 Nyls Nyman	Manager: 21 Bob Lemon; Coaches: 14 Larry Doby; 29 Bobby Knoop; 9 Minnie Miñoso; 31 Stan Williams

== Player stats ==
=== Batting ===
Note: G = Games played; AB = At bats; R = Runs scored; H = Hits; 2B = Doubles; 3B = Triples; HR = Home runs; RBI = Runs batted in; BB = Base on balls; SO = Strikeouts; AVG = Batting average; SB = Stolen bases

Player	G	AB	R	H	2B	3B	HR	RBI	BB	SO	AVG	SB
Alan Bannister, SS, 2B, LF, CF	139	560	87	154	20	3	3	57	54	49	.275	4
Kevin Bell, SS, 3B	9	28	4	5	1	0	1	6	3	8	.179	0
Jack Brohamer, 3B, 2B	59	152	26	39	10	3	2	20	21	8	.257	0
Bob Coluccio, OF	20	37	4	10	0	0	0	7	6	2	.270	0
Henry Cruz, OF	53	77	13	17	2	1	2	10	8	11	.221	0
Tommy Cruz, LF	4	2	1	0	0	0	0	0	0	0	.000	0
Brian Downing, C, DH, OF	69	169	28	48	4	2	4	25	34	21	.284	1
Jim Essian, C	114	322	50	88	18	2	10	44	52	35	.273	1
John Flannery, SS	7	2	1	0	0	0	0	0	1	1	.000	0
Oscar Gamble, DH, OF	137	408	75	121	22	2	31	83	54	54	.297	1
Ralph Garr, LF	134	543	78	163	29	7	10	54	27	44	.300	12
Jerry Hairston, CF, LF	13	26	3	8	2	0	0	4	5	7	.308	0
Lamar Johnson, DH, 1B	118	374	52	113	12	5	18	65	24	53	.302	1
Don Kessinger, SS, 2B, 3B	39	119	12	28	3	2	0	11	13	7	.235	2
Chet Lemon, CF	150	553	99	151	38	4	19	67	52	88	.273	8
Bob Molinaro, RF	1	2	0	1	0	0	0	0	0	1	.500	1
Bill Nahorodny, C	7	23	3	6	1	0	1	4	2	3	.261	0
Tim Nordbrook, SS	15	20	2	5	0	0	0	1	7	4	.250	1
Wayne Nordhagen, RF, LF, DH	52	124	16	39	7	3	4	22	2	12	.315	1
Nyls Nyman, PH	1	1	0	0	0	0	0	0	0	0	.000	0
Jorge Orta, 2B	144	564	71	159	27	8	11	84	46	49	.282	4
Eric Soderholm, 3B, DH	130	460	77	129	20	3	25	67	47	47	.280	2
Jim Spencer, 1B	128	470	56	116	16	1	18	69	36	50	.247	1
Mike Squires, 1B	3	3	0	0	0	0	0	0	0	1	.000	0
Royle Stillman, OF, DH	56	119	18	25	7	1	3	13	17	21	.210	2
Richie Zisk, RF, DH, LF	141	531	78	154	17	6	30	101	55	98	.290	0
Team totals	162	5633	844	1568	254	52	192	809	559	666	.278	42

=== Pitching ===
Note: W = Wins; L = Losses; ERA = Earned run average; G = Games pitched; GS = Games started; SV = Saves; IP = Innings pitched; H = Hits allowed; R = Runs allowed; ER = Earned runs allowed; HR = Home runs allowed; BB = Walks allowed; K = Strikeouts

Player	W	L	ERA	G	GS	SV	IP	H	R	ER	HR	BB	K
Larry Anderson	1	3	9.35	6	0	0	8.2	10	10	9	1	19	7
Francisco Barrios	14	7	4.12	33	31	0	231.1	241	117	106	22	59	119
Ken Brett	6	4	5.01	13	13	0	82.2	101	47	46	10	15	39
Clay Carroll	1	3	4.76	8	0	1	11.1	14	7	6	3	4	4
Bruce Dal Canton	0	2	3.75	8	0	2	24.0	20	11	10	1	13	9
Dave Frost	1	1	3.04	4	3	0	23.2	30	9	8	0	3	15
Dave Hamilton	4	5	3.61	55	0	9	67.1	71	33	27	6	37	45
Bart Johnson	4	5	4.01	29	4	2	92.0	114	48	41	5	41	46
Don Kirkwood	1	1	5.18	16	0	0	40.0	49	27	23	3	12	24
Chris Knapp	12	7	4.80	27	26	0	146.1	166	90	78	16	62	103
Ken Kravec	11	8	4.10	26	25	0	166.2	161	87	76	12	57	125
Jack Kucek	0	1	3.63	8	3	0	34.2	35	20	14	4	10	25
Lerrin LaGrow	7	3	2.46	66	0	25	98.2	81	32	27	10	38	63
Silvio Martinez	0	1	5.57	10	0	1	21.0	28	14	13	4	14	10
Steve Renko	5	0	3.54	8	8	0	53.1	55	23	21	3	17	36
Steve Stone	15	12	4.51	31	31	0	207.1	228	115	104	25	83	124
John Verhoeven	0	0	2.61	6	0	0	10.1	9	3	3	0	2	6
Randy Wiles	1	1	10.13	5	0	0	2.2	5	3	3	1	4	0
Wilbur Wood	7	8	4.99	24	18	0	122.2	139	75	68	10	50	42
Team totals	90	72	4.25	162	162	40	1444.2	1557	771	682	136	540	842

== Awards and honors ==
=== All-Stars ===
All-Star Game

- Richie Zisk, starter, outfield

== Farm system ==
Level	Team	League	Manager
AAA	Iowa Oaks	American Association	Joe Sparks
AA	Knoxville Knox Sox	Southern League	Jim Napier
A	Appleton Foxes	Midwest League	Gordon Lund
Rookie	GCL White Sox	Gulf Coast League	Joe Jones

The GCL White Sox won their league's championship.
