= Bob O'Brien (baseball) =

American baseball player (born 1949)

- Pitcher
- Born: April 23, 1949 (age 77); Pittsburgh, Pennsylvania, U.S.
- Batted: Left Threw: Left

MLB debut
- April 11, 1971, for the Los Angeles Dodgers

Last MLB appearance
- July 7, 1971, for the Los Angeles Dodgers

MLB statistics
- Win–loss record: 2–2
- Earned run average: 3.00
- Strikeouts: 15
- Stats at Baseball Reference

Teams
- Los Angeles Dodgers (1971)

Robert Allen O'Brien (born April 23, 1949) is an American former pitcher in Major League Baseball. He pitched in 14 games for the Los Angeles Dodgers during the 1971 season, including four starts and one shutout.

== Baseball career ==
O'Brien was acquired along with Doyle Alexander, Sergio Robles and Royle Stillman by the Baltimore Orioles from the Dodgers for Frank Robinson and Pete Richert at the Winter Meetings on December 2, 1971.
