= Roy Thomas (pitcher) =

American baseball player (born 1953)

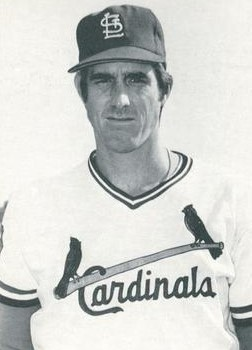
- Pitcher
- Born: June 22, 1953 (age 72); Quantico, Virginia, U.S.
- Batted: Right Threw: Right

MLB debut
- September 21, 1977, for the Houston Astros

Last MLB appearance
- August 4, 1987, for the Seattle Mariners

MLB statistics
- Win–loss record: 20–11
- Earned run average: 3.82
- Strikeouts: 289
- Stats at Baseball Reference

Teams
- Houston Astros (1977); St. Louis Cardinals (1978–1980); Seattle Mariners (1983–1985, 1987)

Roy Justin Thomas (born June 22, 1953) is an American former professional baseball pitcher in Major League Baseball (MLB) who played for the Houston Astros, St. Louis Cardinals and Seattle Mariners in all or parts of eight seasons spanning 1977–1987. Listed at 6' 5" and 215 pounds, Thomas batted and threw right-handed. He was born in Quantico, Virginia.

== Career ==
=== Philadelphia Phillies ===
Thomas grew up in Lompoc, California, and was the star pitcher of the Lompoc Nationals Little League team that went to the SoCal finals at El Monte in 1965. At Lompoc High School, he was teammates with Roy Howell. He was selected sixth overall in the 1971 MLB draft by the Philadelphia Phillies out of Lompoc High at eighteen years old.

After a brief stint with the Northwest League's Walla Walla Phillies in 1971, in which he gave up fourteen earned runs in twelve innings pitched, Thomas went 11-7 with a 3.43 earned run average in 24 starts in his first full minor league season in 1972 with the Western Carolinas League's Spartanburg Phillies. He went 17-8 with a stellar 2.14 ERA and 207 strikeouts with the Rocky Mount Phillies and Reading Phillies in 1973 to earn an invitation to Spring training the following season, but failed to earn a spot in the Phillies' rotation.

=== Chicago White Sox ===
After two more seasons in the Phillies' farm system, the once deemed "untouchable" Thomas was dealt to the Chicago White Sox along with Dick Ruthven and Alan Bannister in exchange for Jim Kaat and Mike Buskey on December 10, 1975. In his only season in the Sox organization, Thomas went 6-11 with a 3.75 ERA with their Triple-A affiliate, the Iowa Oaks. Afterwards, he was selected by the Seattle Mariners with the 31st pick in the 1976 MLB expansion draft. The Mariners then placed him on waivers toward the end of spring training, then worked out a trade to the Houston Astros for infielder Larry Milbourne.

=== Houston Astros ===
Thomas was converted to a relief pitcher in 1977, and went 11-6 with a 3.16 ERA and six saves for the triple A Charleston Charlies to earn a call up to Houston that September. The only two MLB teams Thomas faced in 1977 were the last place Atlanta Braves, and the eventual National League champion Los Angeles Dodgers. In his two games against the Braves, Thomas blew a save opportunity while surrendering four hits and two earned runs in 2.1 innings pitched. In his two games against the Dodgers, he pitched four innings and gave up just one hit while striking out two.

=== St. Louis Cardinals ===
Thomas returned to Charleston in 1978 to go 9-4 with a 3.14 ERA mostly in relief. On June 23, he was selected off waivers by the St. Louis Cardinals, and brought directly to the majors.

In his first appearance with the Cardinals, Thomas earned a win by pitching two scoreless innings in an extra innings affair with the Pittsburgh Pirates. He earned saves in his next two appearances against the Montreal Expos, but was roughed up by the Chicago Cubs in his next two outings. After one more relief appearance, he made an emergency start against the San Diego Padres, and gave up five runs in four innings for his first career loss. He returned to the bullpen after that and earned one save with a 1.54 ERA the rest of the way.

Thomas began the 1979 season assigned to the triple-A Springfield Redbirds, where he was converted back to a starter. He was called up on July 1, and immediately made his first start in the second game of a doubleheader with the Phillies. He gave up one earned run in seven innings but did not figure in the decision. He earned his first win as a starter on August 7 against the New York Mets. Overall, Thomas went 3-4 with a 2.92 ERA and one save mostly in middle relief.

He earned a spot in the Cardinals' bullpen in Spring 1980 but made a bad start to the regular season (11.57 ERA & 1 blown save in April). He then entered the starting rotation and made the finest start of his major league career on May 14 against the Padres. In seven innings, he surrendered five hits and one earned run to earn the win. On May 30, after returning to the bullpen, he struck Montreal Expos outfielder Ellis Valentine in the face with a pitch, shattering his cheekbone. He remained in the Cards' bullpen another month until he was optioned down to Springfield to make room for Silvio Martinez's return from the disabled list. After the season, he was drafted by the Oakland Athletics in the 1980 rule 5 draft.

=== Seattle Mariners ===
In 1981, Thomas went 12-8 with a 3.05 ERA and 111 strikeouts for Oakland's triple-A affiliate, the Tacoma Tigers, but did not see any major league experience. After the season, he was dealt to the Seattle Mariners for minor leaguers Tim Hallgren and Rusty McNealy.

He spent his first Spring with his new club in the majors but was shipped to the triple-A Salt Lake City Gulls just as the 1982 season was set to begin. He successfully made the club the following Spring and spent his first full season in the majors in 1983, when he went 3-1 with a 3.45 ERA and 77 strikeouts in 43 appearances. His 88.2 innings pitched was tops for a right-hander on the club.

A sore elbow in his pitching arm derailed his 1984 season. Though he was only with the M's for a little over half the season, he appeared in 21 games and pitched 49.2 innings. He returned healthy in 1985, but failed to make the club. He actually retired briefly, but reconsidered, and began the season in the Pacific Coast League with the Calgary Cannons.

Thomas was brought up to Seattle in late May and immediately became manager Chuck Cottier's favorite arm out of the bullpen. The Mariners set a franchise record with an eight-game winning streak in late June. Thomas appeared in three games during that stretch and earned two wins while holding opposing batters to a .190 batting average. When fortunes reversed, and the M's were on a six-game losing streak in late July, Thomas pitched 6.1 brilliant innings of relief against the American League champion Boston Red Sox to break the streak. Despite having missed almost two months of the season, he pitched a team high 93.2 innings in relief, compiling a 7-0 record with a 3.36 ERA and seventy strikeouts. As a result, Thomas earned the distinction of having compiled the most wins without a loss ever on a team with a losing record when he went 7-0 for the 1985 Seattle Mariners (74-88). This record would be matched by Aaron Sele in the 2001 Mariners season.

His sore elbow returned just as the 1986 season was set to start. As it turned out, he had elbow tendinitis which rendered him unable to pitch the entire season at any level.

Thomas was released by the M's in December, but returned the following Spring as a non-roster invitee. He earned a spot with the triple A Calgary Cannons, and was brought to the majors in late June. On July 9, 1987 Thomas pitched 4.2 scoreless innings against the Red Sox to earn his first win of the season. Coupled with his 7-0 record in 1985, Thomas ended his major league career with an eight-game winning streak.

Having spent most of his career in the American League, Thomas only logged 34 career at-bats with 4 hits. His only career run batted in came off Randy Jones on July 19, 1978.

Defensively, Thomas was a perfect fielder in the majors. In 419.1 innings pitched in 182 appearances, he recorded a 1.000 fielding percentage, handling 90 total chances with 36 putouts and 54 assists.

=== Senior Professional Baseball Association ===
Thomas also pitched for the St. Lucie Legends and the Sun City Rays of the Senior Professional Baseball Association from 1989–1990, until the league folded in the 1990 midseason.

=== After baseball ===
Following his playing retirement, Thomas worked as a math teacher at Totem Middle School and Illahee Middle School in the Federal Way, Washington School District.
