= Tony Phillips =

American baseball player (1959–2016)

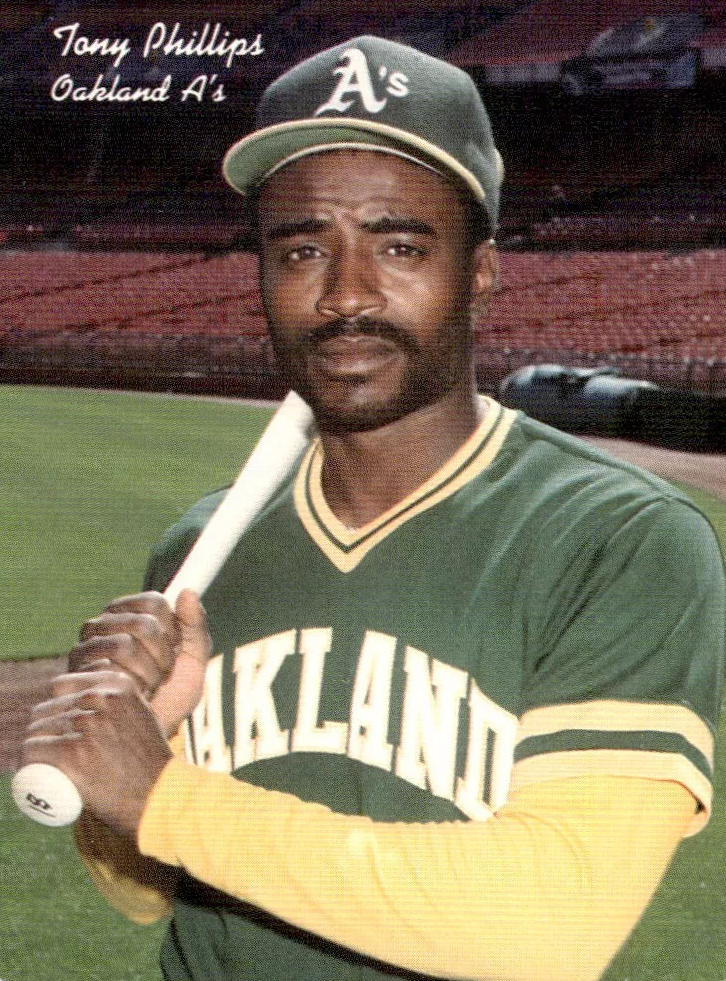
- Phillips with the Oakland Athletics c. 1986
- Outfielder / Infielder
- Born: April 25, 1959; Atlanta, Georgia, U.S.
- Died: February 17, 2016 (aged 56); Scottsdale, Arizona, U.S.
- Batted: Switch Threw: Right

MLB debut
- May 10, 1982, for the Oakland Athletics

Last MLB appearance
- August 15, 1999, for the Oakland Athletics

MLB statistics
- Batting average: .266
- Hits: 2,023
- Home runs: 160
- Runs batted in: 819
- Stats at Baseball Reference

Teams
- Oakland Athletics (1982–1989); Detroit Tigers (1990–1994); California Angels (1995); Chicago White Sox (1996–1997); Anaheim Angels (1997); Toronto Blue Jays (1998); New York Mets (1998); Oakland Athletics (1999)

Career highlights and awards
- World Series champion (1989)
Medals
Men's baseball
Representing United States
Pan American Games
| Bronze medal – third place | 1991 Havana | Team |

Keith Anthony Phillips (April 25, 1959 – February 17, 2016) was an American professional baseball utility player who had an 18-year Major League Baseball (MLB) career from 1982 to 1999. He played regularly at second base, but also had significant time as a shortstop and third baseman. In addition, Phillips showed his versatility with over 100 game appearances in the outfield corners and as a designated hitter.

== Early life ==
Phillips played baseball and other sports for the Roswell High School Hornets in Roswell, Georgia. He played basketball in a brief year at New Mexico Military Institute (with teammate and former NBA player Lewis Lloyd). He is the uncle of professional football player Jermaine Phillips.

== Major League Baseball career ==
On March 27, 1981, Phillips was traded from the Padres along with third baseman Kevin Bell and pitcher Eric Mustad to the Athletics for pitchers Bob Lacey and Roy Meretti. Phillips became the first member of the Oakland Athletics to hit for the cycle, going 5-for-5 against the Baltimore Orioles on May 16, 1986. Phillips also tied the American League record for most assists in a game (12) on July 6, 1986, against the Brewers. In 1988, he had a poor year, hitting just .203 over 212 at bats, and the Athletics lost to the Los Angeles Dodgers in the World Series with Phillips striking out against Orel Hershiser for the final out of the series. However, in 1989 he boosted his average to .262 and the A's swept the San Francisco Giants to win the World Series. Phillips assisted on the final out of the 1989 World Series when he fielded a ground ball off the bat of Brett Butler and then threw to Dennis Eckersley covering first base to clinch the series.

Phillips left Oakland after 1989 to join the Detroit Tigers. His offensive production surged with Detroit: he became proficient at drawing walks, leading the American League in 1993 with 132 after posting 114 in 1992. His 114 runs scored in 1992 were a league best, and he followed that up with 113 runs scored in 1993. His 1993 season was recognized with a 16th-place finish in the MLB Most Valuable Player Award vote. Also, his 1993 season was unique in that he became one of only two players to ever have 100 or more of hits, walks, runs, and strikeouts in a season where the player hit fewer than 10 homers (the other being Chone Figgins in 2009).

After hitting 19 home runs and drawing another 95 walks in 1994, Phillips was traded to the California Angels for Chad Curtis in April 1995, with the season yet to start due to the 1994–95 Major League Baseball strike. He set a career-best mark that year with 27 homers, but drove in just 61 runs due to batting lead-off, and walked 113 times.

1996 saw Phillips move on to the Chicago White Sox, with whom he drew 125 walks, most in the league, and scored 119 runs for the second year in a row. Phillips returned to the Angels via a trade with Chad Kreuter for Jorge Fábregas and Chuck McElroy partway through the 1997 season and drew 102 walks, his third year in a row and fifth year out of six with over 100. In 1998 he played with the Toronto Blue Jays, who traded him to the New York Mets for Leo Estrella, and then signed on with the A's for his final season in 1999.

== Career statistics ==
In his 18-year, 2161 game major league career, Phillips had a cumulative WAR of 50.9 and an OPS of .763. His best one year WAR was 5.2 and his lifetime defensive WAR was a respectable 6.3. Phillips' lifetime OBP was .374. In addition, he posted a .266 batting average (2023-for-7617) with 1300 runs, 360 doubles, 50 triples, 160 home runs, 819 RBI, 177 stolen bases and 1319 base on balls. He finished his career with a .968 fielding percentage. In 13 postseason games, in 1988 and '89, he hit .217 (10-for-46) with 1 home run and 4 RBI.

== Independent leagues ==
Phillips played third base for the Yuma Scorpions of the independent North American League until the team folded in 2012. He played alongside former Athletics teammate Jose Canseco. In August 2011, 52-year-old Phillips was involved in an altercation with former Scorpions manager Mike Marshall, then with the Chico Outlaws. Phillips punched Marshall in the face during the incident, causing the latter to press battery charges against the infielder. He also came out of retirement to play for the Pittsburg Mettle in the Pacific Association of Professional Baseball Clubs in 2015.

== Cocaine arrest ==
On August 10, 1997, Phillips was arrested in Anaheim and charged with buying a small quantity of freebase cocaine. He had been found by police in a hotel room with $30 worth of cocaine and a pipe used to smoke it.

Phillips pleaded guilty to one count of felony cocaine possession, with the charge subject to dismissal if he completed drug counseling and then stayed drug-free for a year. As Phillips met those conditions, the charge was dismissed by an Orange County, California, judge in May 1999.

== Death ==
Phillips died in Arizona of an apparent heart attack on February 17, 2016.

== See also ==
- List of Major League Baseball players to hit for the cycle

Achievements
| Preceded by Rich Gedman | Hitting for the cycle May 16, 1986 | Succeeded by Kirby Puckett |
