= Bob Lacey =

American baseball player (1953–2026)

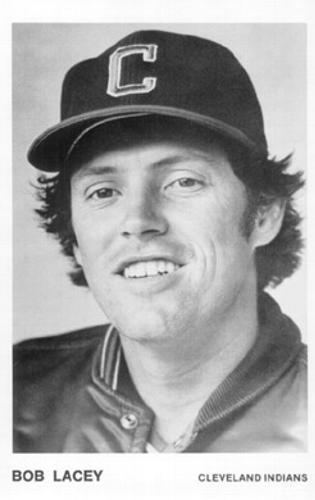
- Pitcher
- Born: August 25, 1953; Fredericksburg, Virginia, U.S.
- Died: June 4, 2026 (aged 72); Alexandria, Virginia, U.S.
- Batted: Right Threw: Left

MLB debut
- May 13, 1977, for the Oakland Athletics

Last MLB appearance
- September 26, 1984, for the San Francisco Giants

MLB statistics
- Win–loss record: 20–29
- Earned run average: 3.67
- Strikeouts: 251
- Stats at Baseball Reference

Teams
- Oakland Athletics (1977–1980); Cleveland Indians (1981); Texas Rangers (1981); California Angels (1983); San Francisco Giants (1984)

Robert Joseph Lacey Jr. (August 25, 1953 – June 4, 2026) was an American professional baseball pitcher. He played all or part of seven seasons in Major League Baseball for the Oakland Athletics, Cleveland Indians, Texas Rangers, California Angels, and San Francisco Giants.

== Early career ==
Lacey once struck out 19 batters during an American Legion playoff game as a youth. He was a 10th-round draft selection of the Oakland A's in 1972, and he was 13–2 in his first minor league season. However, as the A's dynasty began to crumble as the decade wore on, Lacey was given an opportunity at the major league level during the 1977 season.

== Major league career ==
=== 1978–1979 ===
In just his fourth major league appearance, he struck out future Hall of Famer Reggie Jackson twice in a crucial situation, enraging Jackson and the Yankees in the process. Later, he would engage in a brawl with the Kansas City Royals' Darrell Porter, who called Lacey a "crazy, immature, punk." Despite this, he emerged as Oakland's most reliable relief pitcher and led the American League in appearances in 1978.

No other pitcher in league history inherited more baserunners than Bob Lacey did in 1978 (104). Despite that, he won eight games, crafted a 3.01 ERA and saved five games. He had a disappointing 1979 season suffering with bursitis in his heel.

=== 1980 ===
In 1980, Lacey may have been the least used closer of the modern era. While Lacey appeared in a team-high 47 games, finishing 31, he only earned six saves. This was due to Oakland's record-setting starting pitching. In what will likely never be duplicated in today's game, the A's pitched an astonishing 94 complete games in 1980, leaving little left for relievers like Lacey. This eventually led to friction with his manager, Billy Martin, over how he was used. Martin did give Lacey his first ever starting assignment on the next-to-last day of the season, and he blanked the Milwaukee Brewers. Naturally, it was a complete game.

=== Remaining career ===
Lacey was traded to the San Diego Padres in late March 1981 with Roy Moretti for Tony Phillips, Kevin Bell, and Eric Mustad. He was with the Padres for three days, who in turn traded him to the Cleveland Indians. Lacey split time between the Indians and Rangers in 1981 and pitched for Saltillo in the Mexican League in 1982. He was a late-season call up for the California Angels in late 1983 and pitched in relief for the San Francisco Giants in 1984.

He bounced around the minors for the 1985 season before pulling the plug on his seven-year career. He made a comeback of sorts in the late 1990s as manager of the Greensville Bluesmen. Not content with just the dugout, Lacey appeared in eight games of relief over the 1988 and 1989 seasons, and four games each year.

== Death ==
Lacey died on June 4, 2026, at the age of 72.
