= Larvell Blanks =

American baseball player (born 1950)

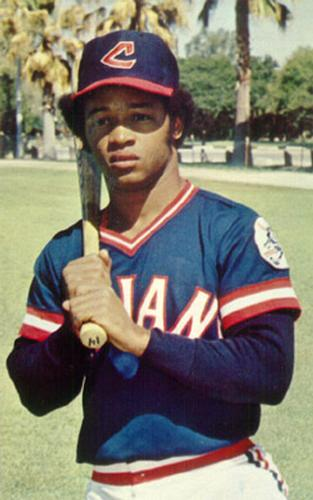
- Infielder
- Born: January 28, 1950 (age 76); Del Rio, Texas, U.S.
- Batted: Right Threw: Right

MLB debut
- July 19, 1972, for the Atlanta Braves

Last MLB appearance
- August 3, 1980, for the Atlanta Braves

MLB statistics
- Batting average: .253
- Home runs: 20
- Runs batted in: 172
- Stats at Baseball Reference

Teams
- Atlanta Braves (1972–1975); Cleveland Indians (1976–1978); Texas Rangers (1979); Atlanta Braves (1980)

Larvell Blanks (born January 28, 1950) is an American former professional baseball player. He played in Major League Baseball as an infielder from 1972 through 1980 for the Atlanta Braves, Cleveland Indians and Texas Rangers. Blanks comes from a family of athletes. His uncle Sid is a former American football player. His cousin, Lance, was a former professional basketball player and was the general manager of the Phoenix Suns of the NBA, while Lance's daughter, Riley, played tennis at the University of Virginia. Larvell currently resides in Del Rio, Texas.

== Early years ==
Blanks was born in Del Rio, Texas, one of Herbert and Hannah Mae Blanks' eight children. When he was twelve years old, Blanks competed in the 1962 Little League World Series with Val Verde County Little League. Besides baseball, he played basketball and track and was a quarterback for San Felipe High School's football team. Upon graduation, he was drafted by the Atlanta Braves in the third round of the 1969 Major League Baseball draft.

Blanks was named team MVP in his first professional season with the Pioneer League's Magic Valley Cowboys. It was around this time he acquired the nickname "Sugar Bear" from teammates Ralph Garr and Darrell Evans due to his aggressive batting style. During his fourth minor league season, he received his first call up to the majors when Braves left fielder Rico Carty went on the disabled list with elbow tendinitis.

== Atlanta Braves ==
Having been used all over the infield in the minors. Blanks played second base primarily in 1972. He ended his first month in the majors with a .415 batting average, but cooled off to .329 by the end of the season. During the off-season, regular second baseman Félix Millán was dealt to the New York Mets, seemingly opening the door for Blanks to inherit the second base job until the Braves acquired Davey Johnson from the Baltimore Orioles four weeks later. Instead, Blanks spent the first two months of the 1973 season as a pinch hitter and pinch runner for Atlanta before being demoted to the Triple A Richmond Braves at the end of May. Blanks batted .261 with twenty home runs and 82 runs batted in over two seasons at Richmond before receiving a call back up to the majors in September 1974.

With incumbent shortstop Craig Robinson not hitting, Blanks was shifted over to short early in the 1975 season. He batted .234 with three home runs and 38 RBIs while committing 27 errors on the field in his only major league season as a regular. Blanks was traded twice on December 12, 1975, the same day at the Winter Meetings that the Braves upgraded at shortstop with the acquisition of Darrel Chaney from the Cincinnati Reds for Mike Lum: first to the Chicago White Sox with Ralph Garr for Ken Henderson, Dick Ruthven and Dan Osborn, then to the Cleveland Indians for Jack Brohamer.

== Cleveland Indians ==
Despite not having a regular position, Blanks still saw a decent amount of playing time in 1976 as a middle infielder. Early in his Cleveland career, Blanks and manager Frank Robinson got along, but the relationship began to crumble in 1977. Blanks batted .280 with five home runs and 41 RBIs his first season in Cleveland, and believed he should be starting at short over Frank Duffy (.212, with two home runs and thirty RBIs in 66 more plate appearances). Robinson stuck with Duffy, however, as he had the better glove. At one point, Blanks took his uniform and set it on fire in a garbage can, to the dismay of Robinson.

Several other players also began to mutiny against Robinson, leading to his dismissal 57 games into the 1977 season. Though Duffy remained the primary shortstop over the rest of the season, Blanks saw an upswing in playing time under new manager Jeff Torborg. On July 8, he enjoyed the only two home run game of his career against the Toronto Blue Jays. When starting third baseman Buddy Bell went down with a stretched ligament in his left knee on September 4, Blanks spent the rest of the season as his team's starting third baseman, batting .329 with six RBIs, however, committing three errors.

In Spring training 1978, Blanks beat out Duffy for the starting shortstop job. Shortly afterwards, Duffy was dealt to the Boston Red Sox. He hit pretty well, driving in ten runs in the month of April, but a throwing error against the California Angels on May 5 was his tenth error in just a month of play. He was soon replaced at short by Tom Veryzer.

== Texas Rangers ==
Blanks and Jim Kern were traded to the Texas Rangers for Bobby Bonds and Len Barker on October 3, 1978. His playing time diminished in Texas. He made just 138 plate appearances, the fewest he'd ever made in a full major league season. After the season, he and Doyle Alexander were traded to the Atlanta Braves for Jeff Burroughs, Adrian Devine, and Pepe Frías. However, Burroughs invoked his no-trade clause. The trade was later worked out with the Braves receiving $50,000 instead of Burroughs.

== Retirement ==
Blanks' second go round with the Braves did not go well as he was released during the 1980 season with a .204 batting average. He signed a minor league deal with the Pittsburgh Pirates in 1981, but decided to head to Mexico instead, playing for the Azules de Coatzacoalcos. He spent five seasons in the Mexican Baseball League before retiring. In 1989, he played with the Orlando Juice of the Senior Professional Baseball Association. He has since taken up golfing and competes on the Golf Channel's Amateur Tour.
