= Lamar Johnson (baseball) =

American baseball player (born 1950)

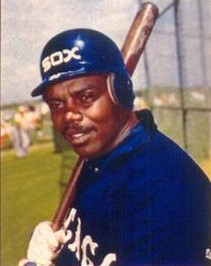
- First baseman / Designated hitter
- Born: September 2, 1950 (age 76); Bessemer, Alabama, U.S.
- Batted: Right Threw: Right

MLB debut
- May 18, 1974, for the Chicago White Sox

Last MLB appearance
- October 2, 1982, for the Texas Rangers

MLB statistics
- Batting average: .287
- Home runs: 64
- Runs batted in: 381
- Stats at Baseball Reference

Teams
- As player: Chicago White Sox (1974–1981); Texas Rangers (1982); As coach: Milwaukee Brewers (1995–1998); Kansas City Royals (1998–2002); Seattle Mariners (2003); New York Mets (2014)

Lamar Johnson Sr. (born September 2, 1950) is an American retired professional baseball player and former hitting coach for the Milwaukee Brewers, Kansas City Royals, Seattle Mariners and New York Mets. He was a first baseman who played in the Major Leagues from 1974 to 1982 for the Chicago White Sox and Texas Rangers. A right-handed batter and thrower, he stood 6 feet 2 inches (1.88 m) tall and weighed 215 pounds (98 kg).

After singing "The Star-Spangled Banner" in pregame, Johnson accounted for all three of the White Sox's hits with a pair of solo home runs and a double in a 2–1 win over the Oakland A's in the opener of a doubleheader at Comiskey Park on June 19, 1977. He performed the national anthem a few more times that season.

== Coaching career ==
Lamar's coaching career began in 1988, when he was hired by the Milwaukee Brewers as a minor league hitting instructor. He coached in Milwaukee's minor league system through 1994, serving as the hitting coach for their AAA affiliate, the Denver Zephyrs, in 1991 and 1992, and as manager of their highest A ball affiliate, the Stockton Ports, in 1993 and 1994.

In December 1994, Lamar Johnson was named by manager Phil Garner as the hitting coach for the Brewers big league club. After having scored only 547 runs in 1994, the club scored 740 runs in 1995, and then 894 runs in 1996, a franchise record. After the offense stagnated over the next two seasons, Johnson was fired by the Brewers in August 1998. But just three months later, the Kansas City Royals hired him to serve in the same capacity.

With the Royals, Johnson again had a remarkable amount of initial success. After having scored 714 runs in 1998, the team scored a club record 856 runs in 1999, and then broke that record again in 2000 by scoring 879 runs, which remains the franchise record today. Of Jermaine Dye, who emerged in those years as a star player, beat writer Joe Posnanski wrote "Dye used to have a loopy swing. Now, thanks in part to hitting coach Lamar Johnson, the swing is as compact as a Honda." But Johnson was fired again nonetheless after the 2002 season, in which the Royals finished 11th in the American League in runs scored.

In 2003, Johnson served as hitting coach for the Seattle Mariners who, despite playing in a pitchers park, had one of the better offenses in the American League that season, winning 93 games. But Johnson was not retained in 2004 despite this, as the offense slumped over the last month of the season.

Since 2005, he has worked in the Mets organization, first as a roving hitting instructor, then as minor league hitting coordinator. With Johnson overseeing the development of young hitters, the Mets farm system has produced enough talent that on April 26, 2011, the team fielded a starting lineup of all homegrown players for the first time since 1971. On May 26, 2014, Johnson was made the new hitting coach for the Mets, replacing Dave Hudgens. He served through the end of the season, then was reassigned as a minor league hitting instructor in the Mets' organization. He was replaced by former Yankees' coach Kevin Long for the 2015 season.
