= Frank Robinson =

American baseball player and manager (1935–2019)

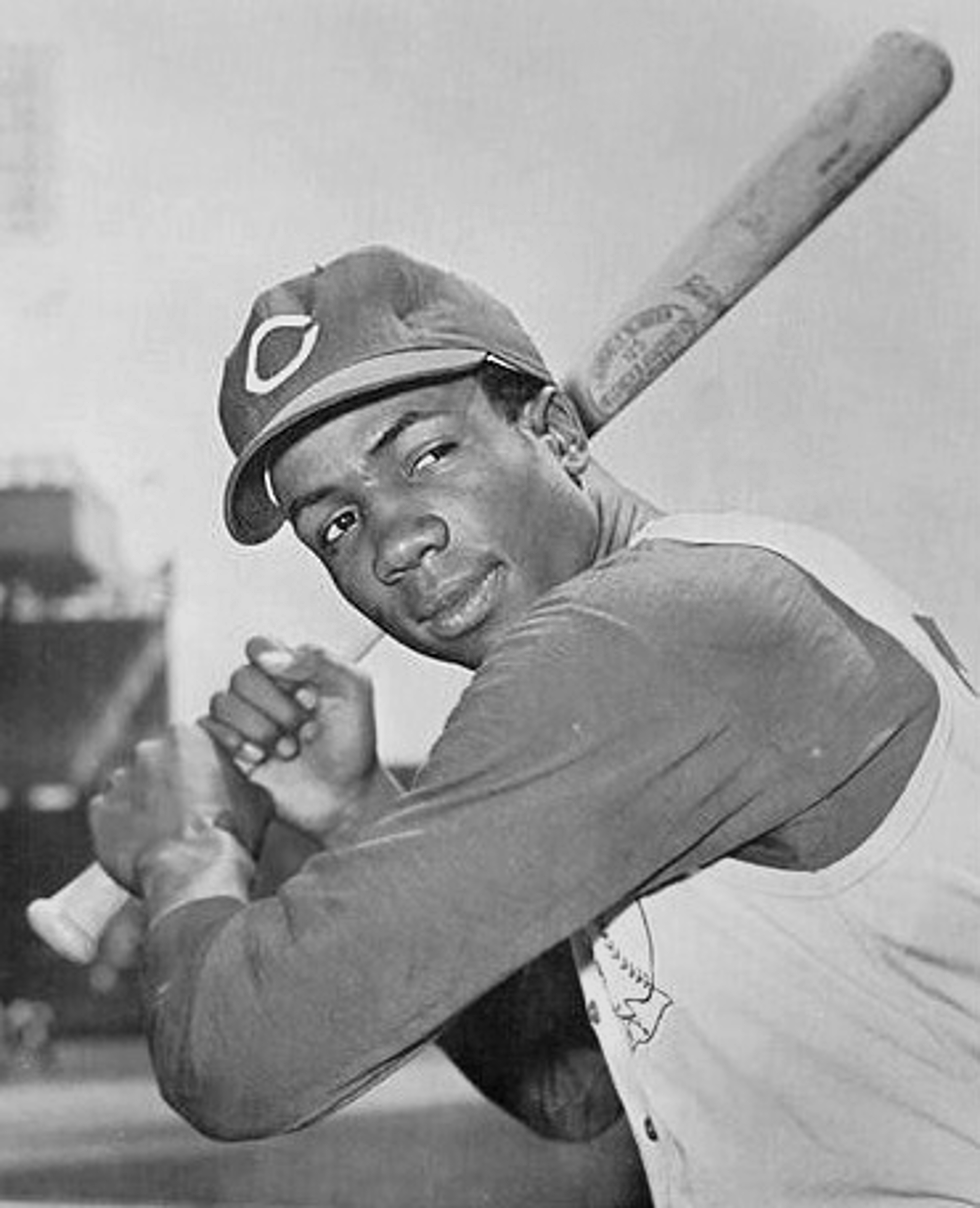
- Robinson with the Cincinnati Reds in 1961
- Outfielder / Manager
- Born: August 31, 1935; Beaumont, Texas, U.S.
- Died: February 7, 2019 (aged 83); Los Angeles, California, U.S.
- Batted: Right Threw: Right

MLB debut
- April 17, 1956, for the Cincinnati Redlegs

Last MLB appearance
- September 18, 1976, for the Cleveland Indians

MLB statistics
- Batting average: .294
- Hits: 2,943
- Home runs: 586
- Runs batted in: 1,812
- Managerial record: 1,065–1,176
- Winning %: .475
- Stats at Baseball Reference
- Managerial record at Baseball Reference

Teams
- As player: Cincinnati Redlegs / Reds (1956–1965); Baltimore Orioles (1966–1971); Los Angeles Dodgers (1972); California Angels (1973–1974); Cleveland Indians (1974–1976); As manager: Cleveland Indians (1975–1977); San Francisco Giants (1981–1984); Baltimore Orioles (1988–1991); Montreal Expos / Washington Nationals (2002–2006); As coach: California Angels (1977); Baltimore Orioles (1978–1980); Milwaukee Brewers (1984); Baltimore Orioles (1985–1987)

Career highlights and awards
- 14× All-Star (1956, 1957, 1959, 1959², 1961, 1961², 1962², 1965–1967, 1969–1971, 1974); 2× World Series champion (1966, 1970); 2× MVP (1961, 1966); World Series MVP (1966); AL Triple Crown (1966); NL Rookie of the Year (1956); Gold Glove Award (1958); AL batting champion (1966); AL home run leader (1966); AL RBI leader (1966); AL Manager of the Year (1989); Cincinnati Reds No. 20 retired; Baltimore Orioles No. 20 retired; Cleveland Guardians No. 20 retired; Cincinnati Reds Hall of Fame; Baltimore Orioles Hall of Fame; Cleveland Guardians Hall of Fame; Washington Nationals Ring of Honor

Member of the National

Baseball Hall of Fame
- Induction: 1982
- Vote: 89.2% (first ballot)

Frank Robinson (August 31, 1935 – February 7, 2019), nicknamed "the Judge", was an American professional baseball outfielder and manager in Major League Baseball (MLB) who played for five teams over 21 seasons: the Cincinnati Reds (1956–1965), Baltimore Orioles (1966–1971), Los Angeles Dodgers (1972), California Angels (1973–1974), and Cleveland Indians (1974–1976). In 1975, Robinson became the first Black manager in big-league history, as the player-manager of the Indians.

The first player to be named Most Valuable Player (MVP) of both the National League (NL) and the American League (AL), Robinson was named the NL MVP after leading the Cincinnati Reds to the pennant in 1961 and was named the AL MVP in 1966 with the Baltimore Orioles after winning the Triple Crown; Robinson's 49 home runs (HR) that year tied for the most by any AL player between 1962 and 1989, and stood as a franchise record for 30 years. He helped lead the Orioles to the first two World Series titles in franchise history in 1966 and 1970, and was named the Series MVP in 1966 after leading the Orioles to a four-game sweep of the Los Angeles Dodgers.

A 14-time All-Star, Robinson batted .300 nine times, hit 30 home runs 11 times, and led his league in slugging four times and in runs scored three times. His 586 career home runs ranked fourth in major league history at the time of his retirement, and he ranked sixth in total bases (5,373) and extra-base hits (1,186), eighth in games played (2,808), and ninth in runs scored (1,829). His 2,943 career hits are the most since 1934 by any player who fell short of the 3,000-hit mark. He was elected to the Baseball Hall of Fame in his first year of eligibility in 1982.

After managing the Indians, Robinson went on to manage the San Francisco Giants, Baltimore Orioles, and Montreal Expos / Washington Nationals. He was awarded the American League Manager of the Year Award in 1989 to become the first person to have won Rookie of the Year, Most Valuable Player, and Manager of the Year awards for a career; he is currently the only person to have done this in MLB history. For most of the last two decades of his life, Robinson served in various executive positions for Major League Baseball concluding his career as honorary president of the American League.

== Early life ==
Robinson was born in Beaumont, Texas. He was the youngest of Ruth Shaw's ten children and the only child of her marriage to Frank Robinson. His parents divorced when he was an infant, and his mother moved with her children to Alameda, California, and then to the West Oakland neighborhood of nearby Oakland. He attended McClymonds High School in Oakland where he was a basketball teammate of Bill Russell. He was a baseball teammate of Vada Pinson and Curt Flood. He also played American Legion Baseball.

== Playing career ==
=== Minor leagues ===
In 1953, Bobby Mattick, a scout for the Cincinnati Reds, signed Robinson to a contract worth $3,500 ($42,118 in current dollar terms). He made his professional debut for the Ogden Reds of the Class C Pioneer League. He batted .348 with 17 home runs and 83 runs batted in (RBI) in 72 games played. He was promoted to the Tulsa Oilers of the Class AA Texas League in 1954, but was demoted to the Columbia Reds of the Class A South Atlantic League. He returned to Columbia in 1955.

=== Major Leagues ===
==== Cincinnati Redlegs / Reds (1956–1965) ====
Robinson made his major league debut on April 17, 1956 at the age of 20. After posting 11 consecutive losing seasons, the Reds surprised their opposition by jumping to first place at the mid-point of the 1956 season. Robinson led the team with 18 home runs at mid-season, earning him the role as starting left fielder for the National League in the 1956 All-Star Game. He became only the sixth rookie player in MLB history to start in an All-Star Game after Joe DiMaggio (1936), Dick Wakefield (1943), Richie Ashburn (1948), Eddie Kazak (1949) and Walt Dropo (1950). The Reds stayed in the pennant race until the last day of the season, ending up with a 91–63 record, two games behind the Brooklyn Dodgers.

Robinson ended the 1956 season with a .290 batting average and 83 RBIs, and his 38 home runs tied the Major League Baseball record for home runs hit by a Rookie player previously set by Wally Berger in 1930. His rookie home run record stood for 31 years when it was broken by Mark McGwire's 49 home runs in 1987. His impressive power hitting display earned him the 1956 National League Rookie of the Year Award.

In 1957, the Reds were once again in first place at mid-season when, Robinson and six of his Redleg teammates—Ed Bailey, Johnny Temple, Don Hoak, Gus Bell, Wally Post and Roy McMillan—were voted into the National League starting lineup for the 1957 All-Star Game. An investigation launched by Commissioner Ford C. Frick found that the majority of the ballots cast had come from Cincinnati as the result of a ballot stuffing campaign by Reds fans.

Frick allowed Robinson to remain on the team while Bell and Post were replaced on the NL starting roster by outfielders Hank Aaron and Willie Mays. Bell remained as a reserve player, but Post was removed from the roster altogether. Subsequently, Frick suspended fans' All-Star game voting rights until they were eventually restored in 1970. The Reds faltered after the All-Star break and dropped to fourth place in the season final standings.

Robinson earned the 1957 Associated Press National League Sophomore-of-the-Year award by improving his batting average to .322, tying him with Hank Aaron for third place in the 1957 NL batting championship race behind future Hall of Fame members Stan Musial (.366) and Willie Mays (.333). He credited manager, Birdie Tebbetts for his performance saying, "He kept after me all year and that's what a young ball player needs." In 1958, Robinson would win the only Gold Glove Award of his career however, his batting average dropped to .269 as the Reds fell to last place in the National League, prompting Tebbetts to announce his resignation on August 14. In 1959, Robinson improved to a .311 batting average along with 36 home runs and 125 RBIs in 146 games. He also enjoyed a productive 1960, batting .297 with 31 home runs and 83 RBIs in 139 games. That year, Robinson led the major leagues in slugging percentage (.595) and on-base plus slugging (1.002), and also ranked first in the NL in hit by pitches (nine).

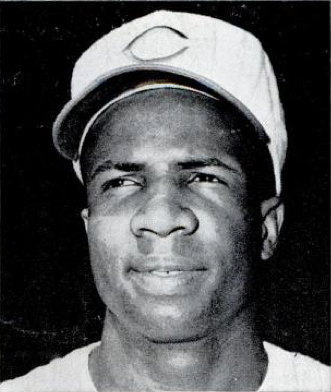
Robinson with the Reds in 1961

In 1961, Robinson moved to right field and produced another strong offensive season. In July he batted .409, hit 13 home runs, and drove in 34 runs to win NL Player of the Month Award, and finished the season with a .323 batting average with 37 home runs and 124 RBIs in 153 games, helping to propel the Reds to the 1961 National League pennant. His performance earned him the 1961 National League Most Valuable Player Award. In the 1961 World Series against the New York Yankees, Robinson had a lackluster performance, producing only three hits as the Reds fell to the Yankees in five games.

Robinson hit a career-high .342 in 1962, just four points behind the NL batting champion, Tommy Davis. He also led the league in runs scored (134), doubles (51), on-base percentage (.421), slugging percentage (.624) and on-base plus slugging (1.045). Robinson's season totals for runs scored, doubles, RBIs (136) and on-base percentage were also career-highs.

Robinson was noted as a fiercely aggressive player. He spiked Johnny Logan in 1957, causing Logan to miss six weeks. In a game against the Milwaukee Braves on August 15, 1960, Robinson slid hard into third base, prompting a fistfight with Milwaukee's future Hall of Fame third baseman, Eddie Mathews.

==== Baltimore Orioles (1966–1971) ====
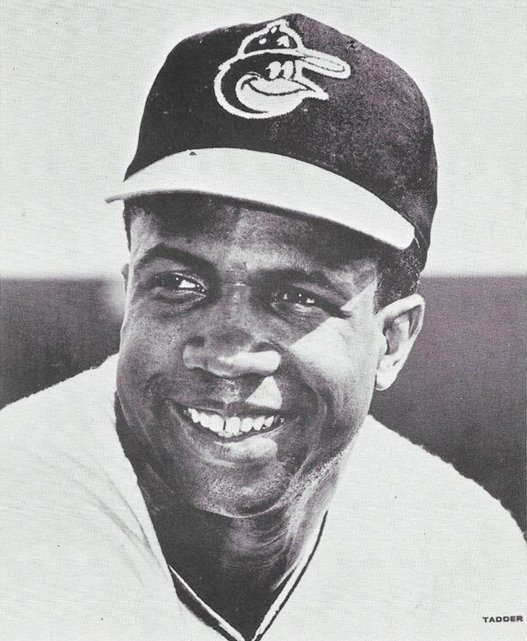
1967 Bethlehem Steel photo of Robinson with the Baltimore Orioles

On December 9, 1965, Reds owner Bill DeWitt traded Robinson to the Baltimore Orioles in exchange for pitcher Milt Pappas, pitcher Jack Baldschun, and outfielder Dick Simpson. Orioles' scout and executive Jim Russo, who had worked under DeWitt with the St. Louis Browns years earlier, was the key Orioles' executive in completing the trade. The trade turned out to be very lopsided. DeWitt, who had a slew of successful trades including his time as general manager in Detroit and the early 1960s rebuilding the Reds, famously referred to Robinson as "not a young 30" after the trade. The Reds led the NL in offense in 1965 and needed pitching. Pappas, who was a consistent performer in Baltimore, was a major disappointment in Cincinnati while Robinson had continued success in Baltimore.

The trade's notoriety became part of popular culture. In the film Bull Durham, the character Annie Savoy (played by Susan Sarandon) says "But bad trades are part of baseball; now who can forget Frank Robinson for Milt Pappas, for gosh sakes". In the film Trouble with the Curve, the character Mickey Lobel (played by Amy Adams) expounds on the trade's details and Robinson's prowess, in establishing her baseball expertise.

In Robinson's first year in Baltimore, he won the Triple Crown, leading the American League with a .316 batting average (then the lowest ever by a Triple Crown winner), a career high 49 home runs (the most ever by a right-handed Triple crown winner) and 122 RBIs in 155 games. On May 8, 1966, Robinson became the only player ever to hit a home run completely out of Memorial Stadium. The shot came off of Luis Tiant in the second game of a doubleheader against the Cleveland Indians, and the home run measured 541 feet (165 m). Until the Orioles' move to Camden Yards in 1992, a flag labeled "HERE" was flown at the spot where the ball left the stadium.

The Orioles won the 1966 World Series, and Robinson was named World Series Most Valuable Player. In the Orioles' four-game sweep of the defending champion Los Angeles Dodgers, Robinson hit two home runs—one in Game 1 (which Baltimore won 5–2), and one in Game 4 (the only run of the game in a 1–0 series-clinching victory). Robinson hit both home runs off of Don Drysdale.

During the 1969 season, Robinson brought some humor to the Orioles' clubhouse by presiding over their kangaroo court, held after every Oriole win. As the judge, he would hear arguments from both sides and give out fines for minor infractions (such as one dollar per lady talked to during a game) and "awards", named after people notoriously bad at a certain skill and involving a prop the "winner" had to display until the next court session. For instance, Jim Palmer once won the John Mason Baserunning Award, a smelly, decrepit baseball cleat presented for baserunning gaffes. Palmer credited the kangaroo court for helping the Orioles bond as a team.

On June 26, 1970, Robinson hit back-to-back grand slams in the fifth and sixth innings in the Orioles' 12–2 victory over the Washington Senators. The same runners were on base both times: Dave McNally was on third base, Don Buford was on second, and Paul Blair was on first.

The Orioles won three consecutive American League pennants between 1969 and 1971. Before the 1969 World Series, Robinson said, "Bring on the Mets and Ron Gaspar!" He was told by his teammate Merv Rettenmund, "It's Rod, stupid." He then retorted by saying, "OK. Bring on Rod Stupid!" Baltimore won the 1970 World Series over the Reds.

Orioles "super scout" Jim Russo, who was a key Orioles' executive in trading for Robinson, said Robinson "was the greatest clutch hitter I've ever seen–better than Mantle, better than Mays, better than Aaron. And that's saying it as strongly as I can because those other three also were genuinely great players. In that specific area–delivering in the clutch, somehow, some way–I rank Frank No. 1".

==== Final years as a player (1972–1976) ====
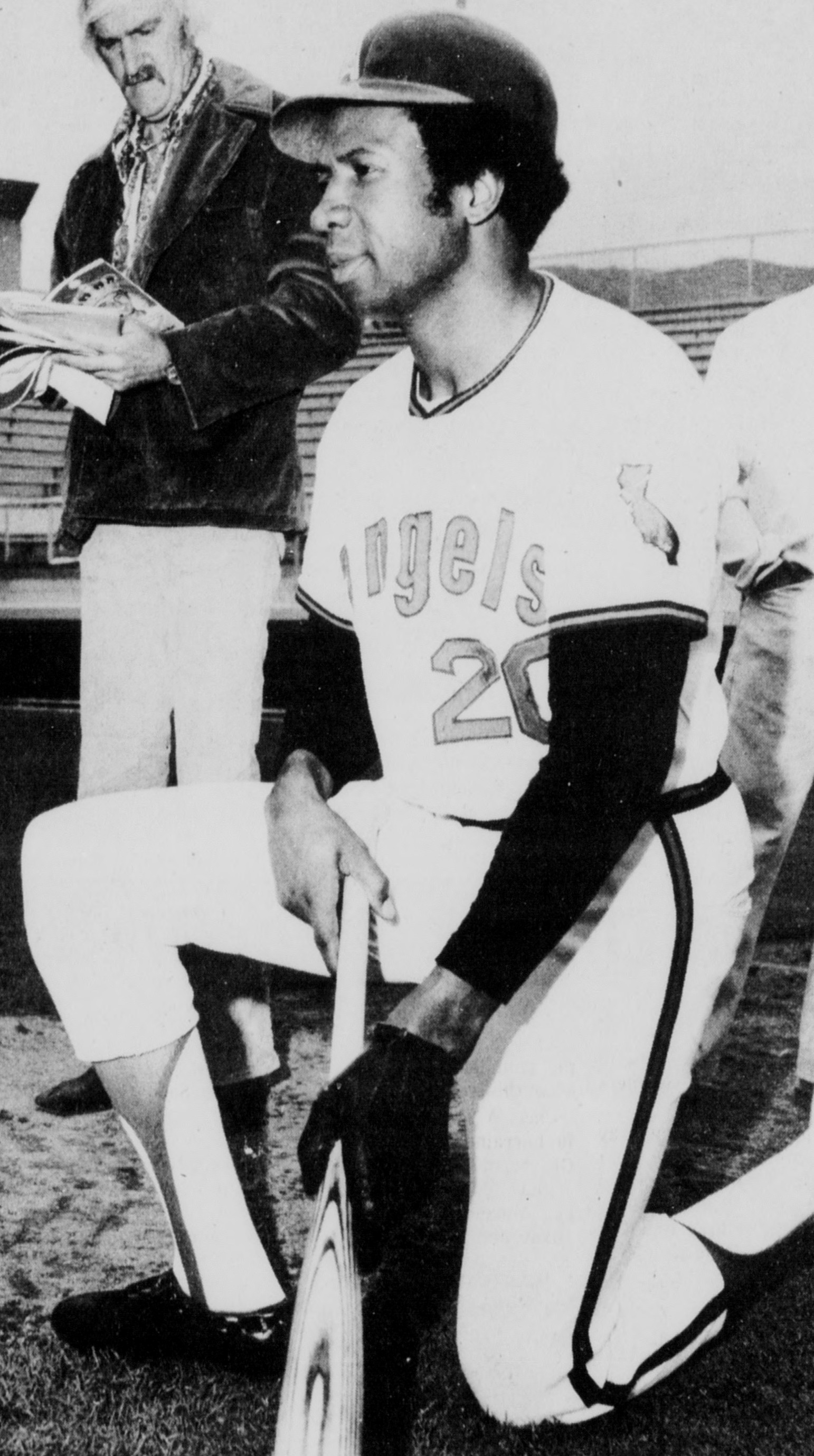
Robinson, circa 1973

Robinson was traded along with Pete Richert from the Orioles to the Los Angeles Dodgers for Doyle Alexander, Bob O'Brien, Sergio Robles and Royle Stillman at the Winter Meetings on December 2, 1971. When the 1972 Major League Baseball strike occurred, Robinson was one of three Dodgers out of thirty who voted against it. When the vote was announced, he said, "I don't believe in the strike, and I voted against it. But I was voted down, so now I'm on your side. I'm with you guys." The 1972 season was his first season in the National League since playing with the 1965 Reds. He played 103 games while compiling a .251 batting average, 59 RBIs, 86 hits, and 19 home runs. Teammate Tommy John said, "Frank didn't have a great year in 1972, but he played hard all year...He set a positive role model for the team."

Robinson's only season with the Dodgers ended when he was dealt along with Bill Singer, Bobby Valentine, Billy Grabarkewitz and Mike Strahler to the California Angels for Andy Messersmith and Ken McMullen at the Winter Meetings on November 28, 1972. The transaction was the result of Robinson's request for regular playing time, something Dodgers general manager Al Campanis wanted for the team's younger prospects. It also reunited him with Angels general manager Harry Dalton who had worked in a similar capacity when both were with the Orioles. In his time with the Angels, he became their first designated hitter while also being teammates again with Vada Pinson. He played 147 games in 1973 and 129 in 1974. In his tenure with the Angels, he hit for a .259 average while posting 50 home runs, 249 hits, and 160 RBIs in 276 games.

On September 12, 1974, the Angels traded Robinson to the Cleveland Indians for Ken Suarez, cash and a player to be named later (Rusty Torres). Three weeks later, the Indians named him their manager and persuaded him to continue playing. In his first at-bat as a player/manager for Cleveland in 1975, he hit a home run off of Doc Medich of the Yankees. He injured his shoulder in 1975 and did not play often. He retired from playing after the 1976 season, after batting .226 with 14 home runs in 235 at-bats for Cleveland from 1974 through 1976. His final at-bat in the majors came against Baltimore on September 18, where he pinch-hit in the eighth inning and collected an RBI base hit in a 3–2 loss.

=== Career statistics ===
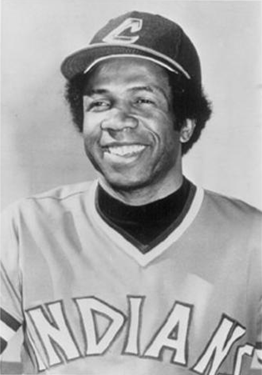
1977 postcard image of Robinson for Cleveland Indians

During a 21-year baseball career, he batted .294 with 586 home runs, 1,812 runs batted in, and 2,943 hits. At his retirement, his 586 career home runs were the fourth most in history (behind only the records of Hank Aaron, Babe Ruth and Willie Mays). He is third on Cincinnati's all-time home run leaders list (324, behind Johnny Bench and Joey Votto) and is the Reds' all-time leader in slugging percentage (.554).

In his career, Robinson held several major league records. In his rookie season, he tied Wally Berger's record for home runs by a rookie (38). (The current record would be set by Pete Alonso in 2019.) Robinson still holds the record for home runs on Opening Day (8), which includes a home run in his first at bat as a player-manager.

Robinson won the 1966 American League Triple Crown (.316 batting average, 49 home runs, 122 RBIs). Only two players (Carl Yastrzemski and Miguel Cabrera) have since won the award in either league, and his two MVP awards made him the first player in baseball history to earn the title in both leagues.

Category	G	BA	AB	R	H	2B	3B	HR	RBI	SB	CS	BB	SO	OBP	SLG	OPS	PO	A	DP	E	FLD%	Ref.
Total	2,808	.294	10,006	1,829	2,943	528	72	586	1,812	204	77	1,420	1,532	.389	.537	.926	6,346	333	263	106	.984	

== Manager ==
=== Managing career ===
Robinson managed in the winter leagues late in his playing career. By the early 1970s, he had his heart set on becoming the first black manager in the majors; the Angels traded him to the Cleveland Indians midway through the 1974 season due to his open campaigning for the manager's job. He was appointed player-manager by the Indians on October 2, 1974, giving him the distinction of being the first black manager in the Majors. On April 8, 1975, Robinson made his debut as a player-manager; batting second as the designated hitter, he hit a home run (his 575th in his career) in the bottom of the 1st inning as the team prevailed 5–3 over the New York Yankees. Robinson had a rocky time in Cleveland, as general manager Phil Seghi generally liked to second guess his manager along with trying to push for him to play alongside managing (the result was that he played roughly 80 games as manager). Disagreements with players such as Gaylord Perry did not help matters (he went to the press saying he wanted to be paid a dollar more than Robinson's $173,500 salary). The Indians had a 79–80 record, and had an 81–78 record in 1976, their first winning record in eight years. Cleveland started the 1977 season 26–31 and fired Robinson on June 19, 1977.

Robinson managed the San Francisco Giants from 1981 through 106 games of the 1984 season, when he was fired. He finished the 1984 season as the hitting coach for the Milwaukee Brewers on a contract worth $1. In 1985, he joined the Orioles' front office. On April 12, 1988, Robinson was named manager of the Orioles, replacing Cal Ripken Sr. after an 0–6 start to the season. He was awarded the American League Manager of the Year Award in 1989 for leading the Orioles to an 87–75 record, a turnaround from their previous season in which they went 54–107, and the division title came down to the final three-game series between Baltimore and the Toronto Blue Jays, but the Jays would win the first two games to clinch the division. It would be the closest Robinson ever came to managing a team to the postseason.

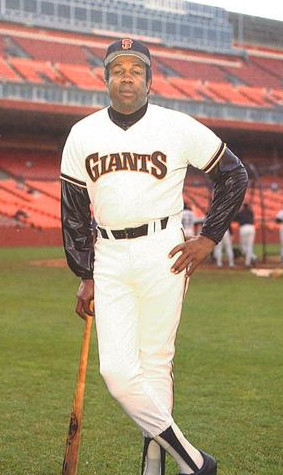
Robinson as manager of the San Francisco Giants in 1983

Robinson was fired by the Orioles in May 1991. After he had spent some years known in baseball as the Director of Discipline, Robinson was chosen by MLB to manage the Montreal Expos in February 2002, which MLB owned at that time. The Expos, who had losing records in the five previous seasons, finished the 2002 and 2003 seasons with 83–79 records. The Expos then next slumped to a 67–95 record in 2004, their final season before relocation to Washington, D.C.

In a June 2005 Sports Illustrated poll of 450 MLB players, Robinson was selected as the worst manager in baseball, along with Buck Showalter, then manager of the Texas Rangers. In the August 2006 poll, he again was voted worst manager with 17% of the vote and 37.7% of the NL East vote.

On April 20, 2006, with the Nationals' 10–4 victory over the Philadelphia Phillies, Robinson got his 1,000th win, becoming the 53rd manager to reach that milestone. He had earned his 1,000th loss two seasons earlier.

During a game against the Houston Astros on May 25, 2006, Robinson pulled Nationals catcher Matt LeCroy during the middle of the seventh inning, violating an unwritten rule that managers do not remove position players in the middle of an inning. Instead, managers are supposed to discreetly switch position players in between innings. However, LeCroy, the third-string catcher, had allowed Astros baserunners to steal seven bases over seven innings and had committed two throwing errors. Although the Nationals won the game 8–5, Robinson found the decision so difficult to make on a player he respected so much, he broke down crying during post-game interviews.

On September 30, 2006, the Nationals' management declined to renew Robinson's contract for the 2007 season, though they stated he was welcome to come to spring training in an unspecified role. Robinson, who wanted either a front office job or a consultancy, declined. On October 1, he managed his final game, a 6–2 loss to the Mets, and prior to the game addressed the fans at RFK Stadium. Robinson's record as a manager stood at 1,065 wins and 1,176 losses. He is one of just seven managers to have won 1,000 games without having made the postseason, and he is the only one to do it since the Expansion Era began in 1961. Five of the other such managers won pennants in the 19th century, while the sixth, Jimmy Dykes, retired as a manager in 1961.

=== Managerial record ===
Team	Year	Regular season					Postseason			
Team	Year	Games	Won	Lost	Win %	Finish	Won	Lost	Win %	Result
CLE	1975	159	79	80	.497	4th in AL East	–	–	–	–
CLE	1976	159	81	78	.509	4th in AL East	–	–	–	–
CLE	1977	57	26	31	.456	fired	–	–	–	–
CLE total		375	186	189	.496		0	0	–	
SF	1981	59	27	32	.458	5th in NL West	–	–	–	–
SF	1981	52	29	23	.558	3rd in NL West	–	–	–	–
SF	1982	162	87	75	.537	3rd in NL West	–	–	–	–
SF	1983	162	79	83	.488	5th in NL West	–	–	–	–
SF	1984	106	42	64	.396	fired	–	–	–	–
SF total		541	264	277	.488		0	0	–	
BAL	1988	155	54	101	.348	7th in AL East	–	–	–	–
BAL	1989	162	87	75	.537	2nd in AL East	–	–	–	–
BAL	1990	161	76	85	.472	5th in AL East	–	–	–	–
BAL	1991	37	13	24	.351	fired	–	–	–	–
BAL total		515	230	285	.447		0	0	–	
MON	2002	162	83	79	.512	2nd in NL East	–	–	–	–
MON	2003	162	83	79	.512	4th in NL East	–	–	–	–
MON	2004	162	67	95	.414	5th in NL East	–	–	–	–
WAS	2005	162	81	81	.500	5th in NL East	–	–	–	–
WAS	2006	162	71	91	.438	5th in NL East	–	–	–	–
MON/ WAS total		810	385	425	.475		0	0	–	
Total		2241	1065	1176	.475		0	0	–	

== Honors ==
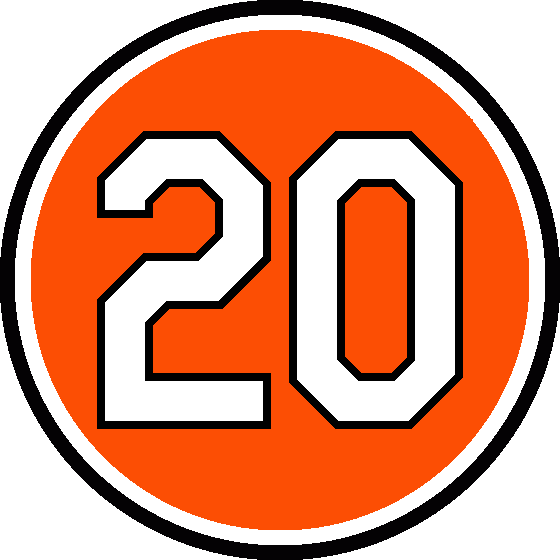
Frank Robinson's number 20 was retired by the Baltimore Orioles in 1972.

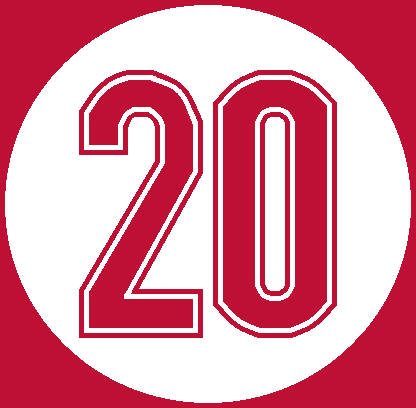
Frank Robinson's number 20 was retired by the Cincinnati Reds in 1998.

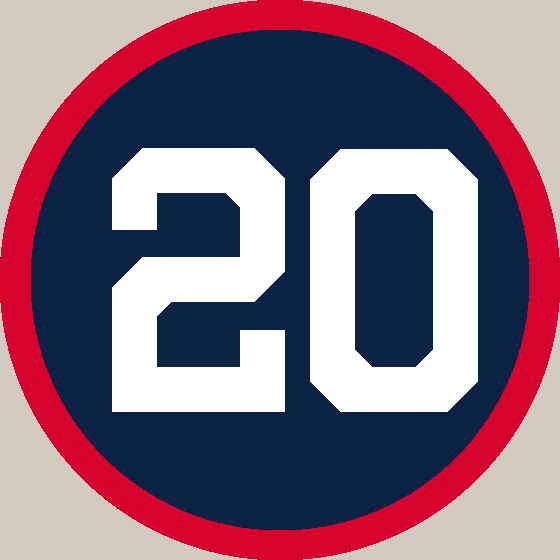
Frank Robinson's number 20 was retired by the Cleveland Indians in 2017.

In addition to his two Most Valuable Player awards (1961 and 1966) and his World Series Most Valuable Player award (1966), Robinson was honored in 1966 with the Hickok Belt as the top professional athlete of the year in any sport.

In 1982, Robinson was inducted into the National Baseball Hall of Fame as a Baltimore Oriole. Robinson is also a charter member of the Baltimore Orioles Hall of Fame (along with Brooks Robinson), and a member of the Cincinnati Reds Hall of Fame, being inducted into both in 1978. He was named to the Washington Nationals Ring of Honor for his "significant contribution to the game of baseball in Washington, D.C." on May 9, 2015. He was inducted into the Cleveland Indians Hall of Fame in 2016. The Reds, Orioles, and Indians have retired his uniform number 20. He is one of only two major-league players, the other being Nolan Ryan, to have his number retired by three different organizations.

In 1999, Robinson ranked 22nd on The Sporting News list of the 100 Greatest Baseball Players. He was nominated as a finalist for the Major League Baseball All-Century Team. In 2020, The Athletic ranked Robinson at number 20 on its "Baseball 100" list, complied by sportswriter Joe Posnanski.

Three teams have honored Robinson with statues:

- In 2003, the Reds dedicated a bronze statue of Robinson at Great American Ball Park sculpted by Cincinnati artist Tom Tsuchiya.
- In 2012, the Orioles unveiled a bronze statue of Robinson at Oriole Park at Camden Yards as part of the Orioles Legends Celebration Series.
- In 2017, the Indians unveiled a bronze statue of Robinson in front of Progressive Field.

=== Awards ===
President George W. Bush awarded Robinson the Presidential Medal of Freedom on November 9, 2005.

The citation on the award read:

"Frank Robinson played the game of baseball with total integrity and steadfast determination. He won Most Valuable Player awards in both the National and American Leagues. He achieved the American League Triple Crown in 1966. His teams won five League titles and two World Series championships. In 1975, Frank Robinson broke the color barrier as baseball's first African-American manager, and he later won Manager of the Year awards in both the National and American Leagues. The United States honors Frank Robinson for his extraordinary achievements as a baseball player and manager and for setting a lasting example of character in athletics."

On April 13, 2007, Robinson was awarded the first Jackie Robinson Society Community Recognition Award at George Washington University.

== Front office and media career ==
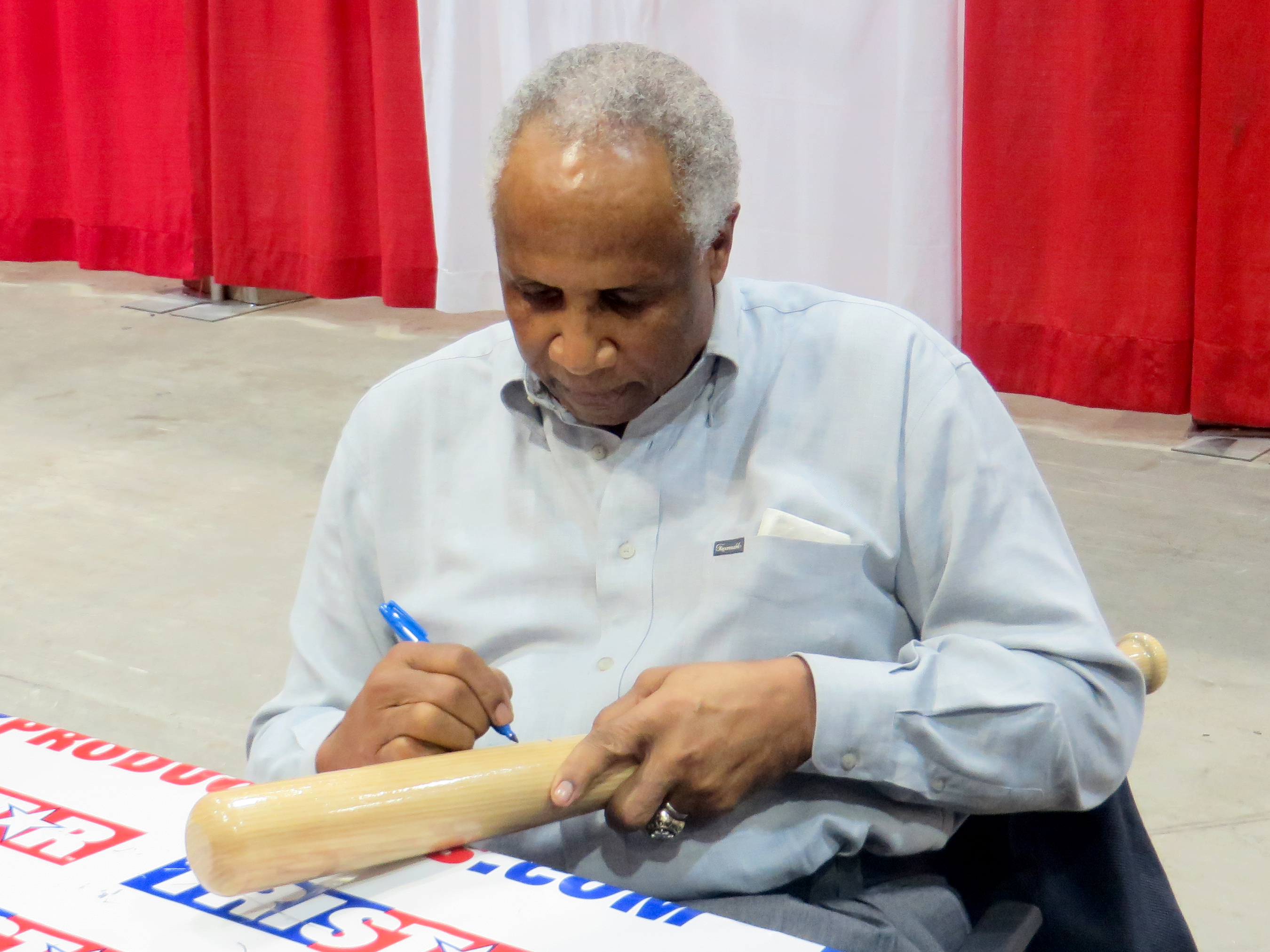
Robinson in January 2014

Robinson served as an assistant general manager for the Orioles through 1995 when he was fired. He worked for MLB as vice president of on-field operations from 1999 to 2002. He was responsible for player discipline, uniform policy, stadium configuration, and other on-field issues.

Robinson served as an analyst for ESPN during spring training in 2007. The Nationals offered to honor Robinson during a May 20 game against his former club, the Baltimore Orioles, but he refused.

In 2007, Robinson rejoined the MLB front office serving as a special advisor for baseball operations from 2007 to 2009. He then served as special assistant to Bud Selig from 2009 to 2010 and was named senior vice president for major league operations from 2010 to 2011. In June 2012, he became executive vice president of baseball development. In February 2015, Robinson left that position and was named senior advisor to the Commissioner of Baseball and honorary American League president.

== Personal life ==
While playing for the Reds in the late 1950s, Robinson attended Xavier University in Cincinnati during the off-season. While in Baltimore, he became active in the civil rights movement. He originally declined membership in the NAACP unless the organization promised not to make him do public appearances. However, after witnessing Baltimore's segregated housing and discriminatory real estate practices, he reconsidered and became an enthusiastic speaker on racial issues.

On February 9, 1961, Robinson pulled a .25 caliber pistol during an argument in a Cincinnati restaurant. He pleaded guilty on March 20 to a charge of carrying a concealed weapon and was sentenced to pay a $250 fine (equivalent to $2,693 in 2025).

Robinson met Barbara Ann Cole in 1961; they married that year and lived in Los Angeles where Barbara sold real estate. They had two children. In 2003, he guest starred on an episode of Yes, Dear as himself, along with Ernie Banks and Johnny Bench.

On February 7, 2019, Robinson died of bone cancer in Los Angeles at the age of 83.

== See also ==
- Major League Baseball titles leaders
- Major League Baseball Triple Crown
- List of Major League Baseball annual doubles leaders
- List of Major League Baseball annual home run leaders
- List of Major League Baseball annual runs batted in leaders
- List of Major League Baseball annual runs scored leaders
- List of Major League Baseball batting champions
- List of Major League Baseball career doubles leaders
- List of Major League Baseball career hits leaders
- List of Major League Baseball career home run leaders
- List of Major League Baseball career runs scored leaders
- List of Major League Baseball career stolen bases leaders
- List of Major League Baseball career bases on balls leaders
- List of Major League Baseball career hit by pitch leaders
- List of Major League Baseball career total bases leaders
- List of Major League Baseball managerial wins and winning percentage leaders
- List of Major League Baseball managers with most career ejections
- List of Major League Baseball player-managers
- List of Major League Baseball players to hit for the cycle
- List of Major League Baseball single-game grand slam leaders

Awards and achievements
Preceded by Mickey Mantle	Hitting for the cycle May 2, 1959	Succeeded by Brooks Robinson
Preceded by George Altman; Ron Santo	Major League Player of the Month; July 1961; August 1964	Succeeded by Warren Spahn; Bob Gibson
Preceded by Jim Northrup	Two Grand Slams in a game June 26, 1970	Succeeded by Robin Ventura
Sporting positions
Preceded by Jim Frey	Baltimore Orioles Hitting Coach; 1978–1980	Succeeded by Ralph Rowe
Preceded by Jim Frey	Baltimore Orioles First Base Coach; 1980	Succeeded by Jimmy Williams
Preceded by vacant	Baltimore Orioles Bench Coach; 1985–1987	Succeeded by vacant
