= Royle Stillman =

American baseball player (born 1951)

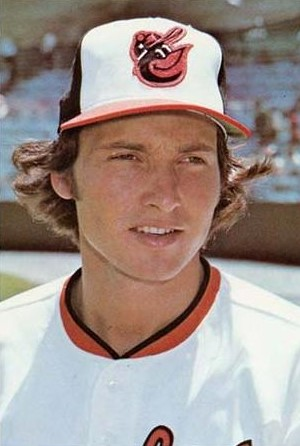
- Outfielder
- Born: January 2, 1951 (age 75); Santa Monica, California, U.S.
- Batted: Left Threw: Left

MLB debut
- June 22, 1975, for the Baltimore Orioles

Last MLB appearance
- October 2, 1977, for the Chicago White Sox

MLB statistics
- Batting average: .213
- Home runs: 3
- Runs batted in: 15
- Stats at Baseball Reference

Teams
- Baltimore Orioles (1975–76); Chicago White Sox (1977)

Royle Eldon Stillman (born January 2, 1951) is an American former professional baseball player whose major league career lasted for 3 seasons (1975–1977).

== Beginnings ==
An outfielder, he appeared in 75 Major League Baseball games, and played all or part of three seasons (1975– 1977) for the Baltimore Orioles and Chicago White Sox. Stillman threw and batted left-handed; he stood 5 feet 11 inches (1.80 m) tall and weighed 180 pounds (82 kg).

== Draft ==
Originally drafted out of North Torrance High School by the Los Angeles Dodgers in 1969 during the 22nd round, the native of Santa Monica, California, played in the Dodger farm system for three years, rising to the Double-A level. He was acquired along with Doyle Alexander, Bob O'Brien and Sergio Robles by the Baltimore Orioles from the Dodgers for Frank Robinson and Pete Richert at the Winter Meetings on December 2, 1971.

== Minor Leagues ==
Stillman spent 3 1/2 more seasons in the minors — batting over .300 twice — before his recall to Baltimore in June 1975. In his debut on June 22, he pinch hit for Doug DeCinces and struck out against Luis Tiant of the Boston Red Sox. He returned to the Triple-A Rochester Red Wings until his September recall, and he collected six hits in 13 at bats during that late-season trial to finish with a .429 MLB batting average.

== Late career ==
Stillman played briefly in 1975 for the Orioles, his first major league appearance. Six times throughout the 1975 season, he was listed as the starting shortstop, but only to have plate appearances in the first inning before being replaced by light-hitting Mark Belanger. While Stillman never took the field as a shortstop, this gives him the unusual distinction of being the only left-hander in Major League history to start at shortstop more than once, with only four other known players having been such in one game. In this "pinch hitting in reverse" role, Stillman went 3-for-6.

Stillman made the Orioles' roster in 1976 but collected only two hits in 22 at-bats in part-time duty, largely as a pinch hitter, before returning to Rochester. Signed as a free agent by the White Sox after the season, he spent all of 1977 with Chicago, getting into 56 games, making 137 plate appearances, and hitting his only three Major League home runs. His 33 MLB hits also included seven doubles and one triple.
