= Ralph Garr =

American baseball player (born 1945)

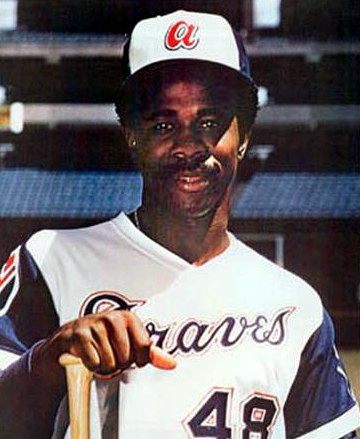
- Outfielder
- Born: December 12, 1945 (age 80); Monroe, Louisiana, U.S.
- Batted: Left Threw: Right

MLB debut
- September 3, 1968, for the Atlanta Braves

Last MLB appearance
- June 4, 1980, for the California Angels

MLB statistics
- Batting average: .306
- Home runs: 75
- Runs batted in: 408
- Stats at Baseball Reference

Teams
- Atlanta Braves (1968–1975); Chicago White Sox (1976–1979); California Angels (1979–1980)

Career highlights and awards
- All-Star (1974); NL batting champion (1974); Braves Hall of Fame

Ralph Allen Garr (born December 12, 1945), nicknamed "Road Runner", is an American former professional baseball player, scout, and coach. He played in Major League Baseball (MLB) as an outfielder from 1968 through 1980 — most notably as a member of the Atlanta Braves — and eventually with the Chicago White Sox and California Angels.

Garr's career year was 1974, when he was a National League (NL) All-Star and won the NL batting title. Garr was a free swinger who could confound defenses by hitting to all parts of the outfield. He batted .300 or better five times during his career. In 2006, Garr was inducted into the Atlanta Braves Hall of Fame.

== Face in the Crowd ==
Garr was born in Monroe, Louisiana, and worked as a shoe shine boy at a local barber shop growing up. After graduation from Lincoln High School in Ruston, Louisiana, he attended historically black Grambling State University in Grambling, Louisiana. In 1967, as a second baseman for the Grambling State Tigers baseball team, Garr led the National Association of Intercollegiate Athletics with a record .585 batting average to lead his team to a 35–1 regular-season mark. His accomplishment earned mention in Sports Illustrated's "Faces In The Crowd" right around the same time he was being drafted by the Atlanta Braves in the third round of the 1967 Major League Baseball draft.

== Early years ==
Though Garr was a fast runner and good contact hitter, he was a below average infielder. He was converted to an outfielder with the Shreveport Braves in 1968, and remained in the outfield for the rest of his career. After two minor league seasons in which he batted .287 with 53 runs batted in (RBI), Garr made the jump from Double A to the majors in September 1968. The speedy Garr appeared in 11 games with the Braves, but never needed his glove once, as he was used as a pinch hitter or pinch runner in each of his appearances, and never once was kept in the game. Regardless, he earned an invite to spring training 1969, and started the season as the Braves' everyday left fielder when Rico Carty dislocated his shoulder. Upon Carty's return, Garr was optioned to their Triple A affiliate, the Richmond Braves, then returned in September when rosters expanded. Overall, he batted .222 in 22 games.

Garr again made the Braves out of spring training 1970, and resumed the role he had at the end of the 1968 and 1969 seasons. He appeared in 16 games with the Braves through May, but had already earned a reputation as something of a defensive liability at this point in his career, and never once took the field. Garr was optioned back to Richmond at the end of May, and went on to bat an International League record .386 with seven home runs, 51 RBI, and a league best 39 stolen bases. He returned to Atlanta in September as a fourth outfielder, and batted .302 in 91 plate appearances.

== "Road Runner" ==
In 1970, Rico Carty injured his left knee playing Winter ball in the Dominican Republic, and was lost for the entire 1971 season. Garr seized the opportunity, batting over .400 through the middle of May, and earning the nickname "Road Runner" due to his speed. On May 17, against Tom Seaver and the New York Mets, Garr hit a solo home run with two outs in the tenth inning to tie the game. He hit a second home run in the 12th for the walk-off victory.

Garr became so popular with fans in Atlanta that the Braves negotiated exclusive big-league baseball rights with Warner Bros. Cartoons to use animated scenes of the Looney Tunes character Road Runner on the scoreboard, while the calliope erected behind right field went "beep-beep" like the cartoon character every time Garr reached first base. By the end of the season, Garr's batting average cooled off to .343, good for second best in the NL to the St. Louis Cardinals' Joe Torre. He also scored a career high 101 runs batting second in the Braves' batting order.

Unfortunately, Garr's defensive shortcomings (he led N.L. outfielders with 11 errors) caused him to lose his starting job in left field when Carty returned to the Braves in 1972. He still appeared in 134 games and managed a .962 fielding percentage manning all three outfield spots. His .325 batting average was again second best in the league (this time to the Chicago Cubs' Billy Williams). At the end of the season, Carty was traded to the Texas Rangers, opening a permanent spot for Garr.

Garr again put up solid offensive numbers in 1973 (.299 batting average, 11 home runs, 94 runs scored, and a career high 55 RBI and 35 stolen bases), but his weak glove made him trade-bait at the 1973 Winter meetings. Needing to strengthen their infield defense as well, the Braves had a deal in place that would have sent Garr to the Philadelphia Phillies for shortstop Larry Bowa, however it fell through. Instead, he remained in Atlanta, and put together the best season of his career, flirting with a .400 batting average for much of the first half of the season. He had 149 hits heading into the All-Star break that year, a record which stands to this day, to earn selection to the National League All-Star team (he went 0-for-3 with a strikeout). He ended the season with a league best .353 average, and also led the NL in hits (214) and triples (17).

Garr spent much of his early career believing he was greatly underpaid by the Braves, so after that career year Garr sought a raise to $114,500 for the 1975 season, more than double what he received in 1974, at which the Braves countered with $85,000. The contract dispute went to arbitration, with Garr winning to become the highest paid player on the team, and the first player in major league history to double his salary through arbitration.

Despite an excellent spring, and going into the season with confidence, Garr's average dipped to .278 in 1975. He did, however, lead the league in triples (11) for a second year in a row. Garr and Larvell Blanks were traded to the Chicago White Sox for Ken Henderson, Dick Ruthven and Dan Osborn on December 12, 1975.

== Chicago White Sox ==
Disarray was something of a theme for the 1976 White Sox as Jorge Orta, the second baseman with the 1975 team Chuck Tanner managed was used at third and left field in 1976 by new manager Paul Richards. Likewise, Garr's role with the Chisox in 1976 was similar to the one he had with the Braves in 1972; he had no regular outfield position, and his playing time was split evenly between all three outfield spots. The formula proved unsuccessful as the Sox narrowly avoided a hundred losses in 1976. For his part, Garr batted an even .300, and was second on the team to Orta with 63 runs scored.

Bob Lemon replaced Richards at the helm in 1977, returning Orta to second base, and returning Garr to left field. The Chisox did a complete 180 that year as they won ninety games to finish third in the American League West. Garr batted an even .300 for the second year in a row, while improving substantially in every other offensive category. His fielding also improved as he logged a career high .987 fielding percentage.

Garr had an off year in 1978, putting up career lows in just about every offensive category. His notoriously bad fielding was also becoming an issue again. He and pitcher Francisco Barrios became embroiled in a fight on August 10, following a loss to the Toronto Blue Jays, over an incident in their August 7 matchup with the Kansas City Royals. With Barrios pitching, Garr threw a ball he fielded off the wall to the wrong base, allowing a runner to score. It was the second run-in between the two.

Garr started the 1979 season in left field, but shortly after Tony La Russa replaced Don Kessinger as White Sox manager, Garr was replaced by a revolving door of left fielders, with Alan Bannister, Thad Bosley, Junior Moore, and Wayne Nordhagen all manning the position at one point or another. Rumors circulated that it was by Garr's choice; he refused to take the field following an August 5 rock concert held at Comiskey Park that left the field in tattered condition (American League (AL) President Lee MacPhail actually canceled games at Comiskey later in the month due to the poor conditions of the outfield). On September 20, with only nine games left on the schedule, Garr's contract was sold to the California Angels.

Garr was used as a designated hitter in California, but managed to bat just .167 in that role, and was released on June 6, 1980.

== In retirement ==
Garr became part-owner and a part-time worker at Kaloche doughnut shop in Houston, Texas, following his retirement. When the 1984 Winter meetings were held in Houston, Garr attended, seeking a scouting or coaching job. Baseball legend and Garr's former teammate, Hank Aaron, the Braves' director of player development, offered Garr a position as roving scout and minor-league base-running coach.

Garr played professional softball for Lima Steele's in the United Professional Softball League (UPSL) during their 1982 season.

Garr was inducted into the Louisiana Sports Hall of Fame in 1985, Grambling State University Alumni Hall of Fame in 1991, the Atlanta Braves Hall of Fame in 2006 and the International League Hall of Fame in 2008. In his 2012 film, Trouble with the Curve, Clint Eastwood's character, fictional Braves scout Gus Lobel, is credited with signing Dusty Baker, Dale Murphy, Tom Glavine, Chipper Jones, and Garr. The scout who actually signed Garr was Mel Didier.

== Career statistics ==
In 1,317 games over 13 seasons, Garr batted .306 (1,562-for-5,108) with 717 runs scored, 212 doubles, 64 triples, 75 home runs, 408 RBI, 172 stolen bases, 246 walks, an on-base percentage of .339, and a slugging percentage of .416. He compiled a .968 fielding percentage playing at all three outfield positions.

== See also ==
- List of Major League Baseball annual triples leaders

| Preceded by Tommy John | National League Player of the Month; May 1974 | Succeeded by Buzz Capra |
