= Mike Buskey =

American baseball player (born 1949)

- Shortstop
- Born: January 13, 1949 (age 77); San Francisco, California, U.S.
- Batted: Right Threw: Right

MLB debut
- September 5, 1977, for the Philadelphia Phillies

Last MLB appearance
- October 1, 1977, for the Philadelphia Phillies

MLB statistics
- Batting average: .286
- Home runs: 0
- Runs batted in: 1
- Stats at Baseball Reference

Teams
- Philadelphia Phillies (1977)

Michael Thomas Buskey (born January 13, 1949) is an American former professional baseball infielder, who played in Major League Baseball (MLB) for the Philadelphia Phillies in 1977. Buskey batted and threw right-handed. During his playing days, he stood 5 ft 11 in (1.80 m), weighing 160 pounds (73 kg).

== Baseball career ==
Scholastically, Buskey attended Terra Nova High School in Pacifica, California and University of San Francisco. He led the Dons in batting average, with a .361 mark, and hits, with 61, in 1971. Buskey was inducted into the USF Dons Sports Hall of Fame, in 1980. Buskey was originally signed by the Chicago White Sox as an undrafted amateur free agent, prior to the 1971 season.

After spending five seasons in Minor League Baseball (MiLB) where he progressed steadily through the White Sox farm system, Buskey was dealt along with Jim Kaat to the Phillies for Dick Ruthven, Alan Bannister and Roy Thomas on December 10, 1975. Buskey, primarily a shortstop, spent the entire 1976 and most of the1977 campaigns with the Phillies’ Triple-A affiliate Oklahoma City 89ers. He finally received the call to the big leagues on September 5, 1977, at the age of 28. This was to be Buskey's only MLB cup of coffee, as he made his last big league game appearance on October 1, 1977.

Buskey's MLB career statistical line reads: 6 games played, 7 at bats, 2 hits, .286 batting average, 1 run scored, 1 run batted in, 1 hit-by-pitch, .375 on-base percentage, and .571 slugging percentage.
