= Randy Wiles =

American baseball player (1951–2015)

- Pitcher
- Born: September 10, 1951; Fort Belvoir, Virginia, U.S.
- Died: September 15, 2015 (aged 64); New Orleans, Louisiana, U.S.
- Batted: Left Threw: Left

MLB debut
- August 7, 1977, for the Chicago White Sox

Last MLB appearance
- August 16, 1977, for the Chicago White Sox

MLB statistics
- Pitching Record: 1-1
- Earned run average: 10.13
- Strikeouts: 0
- Stats at Baseball Reference

Teams
- Chicago White Sox (1977)

Randall E. Wiles (September 10, 1951 – September 15, 2015) was an American baseball pitcher who appeared in five games for the Chicago White Sox in 1977.

Wiles played with LSU from 1970 to 1972, earning all-SEC recognition in 1972. His seven college shutouts were still an LSU record as of his death in 2015. Wiles was drafted by the St. Louis Cardinals in 1973.

Wiles died after a brief battle with cancer on September 15, 2015.
