= John Flannery (baseball) =

American baseball player (born 1957)

- Shortstop / Third baseman
- Born: January 25, 1957 (age 68); Long Beach, California, U.S.
- Batted: Right Threw: Right

MLB debut
- September 2, 1977, for the Chicago White Sox

Last MLB appearance
- September 19, 1977, for the Chicago White Sox

MLB statistics
- Batting average: .000
- On-base percentage: .333
- Runs: 1
- Stats at Baseball Reference

Teams
- Chicago White Sox (1977)

John Flannery (born January 25, 1957) is an American former professional baseball right-handed shortstop and third baseman who played in seven games for the Chicago White Sox of the Major League Baseball (MLB) in 1977.
