= Dan Osborn (baseball) =

American baseball pitcher (born 1946)

- Pitcher
- Born: June 19, 1946 (age 80); Springfield, Missouri, U.S.
- Batted: Right Threw: Right

MLB debut
- April 26, 1975, for the Chicago White Sox

Last MLB appearance
- September 23, 1975, for the Chicago White Sox

MLB statistics
- Win–loss record: 3–0
- Earned run average: 4.50
- Strikeouts: 38
- Stats at Baseball Reference

Teams
- Chicago White Sox (1975)

Danny Leon "Ozzie" Osborn (born June 19, 1946) is an American former professional baseball player. He played in Major League Baseball as a right-handed pitcher for the Chicago White Sox in 1975.

After his lone season in the majors, he was traded along with Ken Henderson and Dick Ruthven to the Atlanta Braves for Ralph Garr and Larvell Blanks on December 12, 1975.
