= Dick Ruthven =

American baseball player (born 1951)

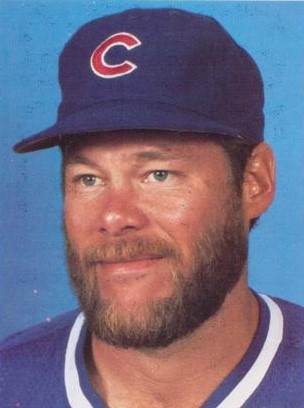
- Pitcher
- Born: March 27, 1951 (age 75); Sacramento, California, U.S.
- Batted: Right Threw: Right

MLB debut
- April 17, 1973, for the Philadelphia Phillies

Last MLB appearance
- May 1, 1986, for the Chicago Cubs

MLB statistics
- Win–loss record: 123–127
- Earned run average: 4.14
- Strikeouts: 1,145
- Stats at Baseball Reference

Teams
- Philadelphia Phillies (1973–1975); Atlanta Braves (1976–1978); Philadelphia Phillies (1978–1983); Chicago Cubs (1983–1986)

Career highlights and awards
- 2× All-Star (1976, 1981); World Series champion (1980)

Richard David Ruthven (born March 27, 1951) is an American former professional baseball player. He played in Major League Baseball as a right-handed pitcher from 1973 through 1986 for the Philadelphia Phillies, Atlanta Braves, and Chicago Cubs. The two-time National League All-Star player was a member of the 1980 world champion Philadelphia Phillies team, as well as a member of the 1984 National League Eastern Division champion Chicago Cubs.

== Major league career ==
=== Draft and early Philly years ===
Ruthven was born in Sacramento, California and attended Irvington High School in Fremont, California. He was selected out of high school by the Baltimore Orioles in the 20th round (469th overall) of the 1969 Major League Baseball draft, but opted to enroll at Fresno State. The Philadelphia Phillies drafted him in the secondary phase of the 1st round of the 1973 Major League Baseball draft. Ruthven made his major league debut with the Phillies on April 17, 1973 at the age of 22. He was described as looking "like a young Lee Marvin" by Ron Fimrite in the April 30, 1973 issue of Sports Illustrated.

In his rookie season of 1973, Ruthven pitched 25 games, starting 23. He finished the season 6-9 with a 4.21 earned run average for a team that finished in last place in the National League Eastern Division with a 71-91 record.

In 1974, Ruthven started 35 games and pitched over 200 innings for the first time (212 2/3). He had a record of 9-13 with a 4.02 earned run average, as the Phillies improved their overall record to 80-82, good enough for third place. He also set his career record for strikeouts with 153.

In 1975, injuries limited Ruthven to 11 games and seven starts. He went 2-2 with a 4.20 earned run average.

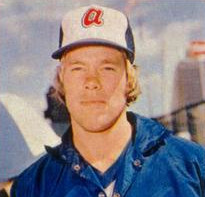
Ruthven with the Atlanta Braves

=== Atlanta Braves ===
Ruthven was traded twice within a span of three days in December 1975. First to the Chicago White Sox with Alan Bannister and Roy Thomas for Jim Kaat and Mike Buskey on December 10. Then to the Atlanta Braves with Ken Henderson and Dan Osborn for Ralph Garr and Larvell Blanks two days later on December 12.

With the Braves, Ruthven had a solid 1976 season, being named to the National League All-Star team for the first time. He was the only Braves player selected to the All-Star Game that year, although NL manager Sparky Anderson never brought him in to pitch. On June 20, he threw a four-hit shutout in a 5-0 victory over the Chicago Cubs. He faded in the latter part of the season, finishing the season 14-17 with a 4.19 earned run average in 36 starts. The 17 losses and 36 starts were both career highs, however, the Braves finished last in the National League Western Division, going 70-92.

Ruthven won three games to start the 1977 season, but suffered a torn ankle tendon after that and was out of action over two months, then after coming off the disabled list, lost eight straight games. He finished the year with 25 games (23 starts). Even though his earned run average did not change much (rising to 4.23), Ruthven finished with only a 7-13 record for a Braves team that lost 101 games.

=== Return to the Phillies ===
"I guess I have something to prove this year," Ruthven said, after a start on April 19, 1978. "Still, I could pitch very well and not have a good record, as I did last year. It would be nice if I could pitch back to 1976." He started with only a 2-6 record for the Braves, though his earned run average had improved some (4.10), when he was re-acquired by the Phillies on June 15. For Ruthven, the Phillies sent popular relief pitcher Gene Garber to Atlanta. Ruthven was stellar with the Phillies, going 13-5 from June 15 to the end of the regular season, with a 2.99 earned run average. For the entire season, Ruthven's record was 15-11 with a 3.38 earned run average. His contributions helped the Phillies win 90 games and capture the Eastern Division title, the team's third division title in a row. He pitched one game against the Los Angeles Dodgers in the 1978 National League Championship Series, losing Game 2 of a series the Phillies lost in four games.

1979 started great for Ruthven, who sprinted out to a 6-0 record and a 1.65 earned run average as of May 9. Unfortunately, injuries would again plague Ruthven for the rest of the season as he would win only one more game through the last of the season, finishing 7-5 with a 4.27 average. Injuries hit other Phillies pitchers, and the three-time division champs fell to fourth place in the National League East, 14 games behind the eventual World Champion Pittsburgh Pirates.

His best season may have been in 1980, a year he did not make the All-Star team. He finished the season with a career-high 17 wins, and had a 3.55 earned run average in 33 games started. Ironically, even though he started every game during the season, Ruthven came in as a relief pitcher in the pivotal 5th game of the National League Championship Series, pitching two shutout innings to earn the victory in the 10th inning, capping a Phillies comeback in a game in which the team faced a 5-2 deficit in the 8th inning against Nolan Ryan. Ruthven pitched the third game of the 1980 World Series, won by the Royals, without a decision. The Phillies won that Series in six games.

Ruthven charged from the gate in 1981, compiling an 8-3 record before the 1981 baseball strike began on June 12. He was the Phillies' representative to the Major League Baseball Players Association. Because of his record, Ruthven was named to the National League All-Star team for the second time. Play resumed on August 10; Ruthven told reporters, "I played catch a little bit during the strike. I don't think I'm that far away. But I've never stopped in the middle of the season, just like anyone else, and I really don't know how long it will take" to get back to form. He struggled for the remainder of the season, going 4-4 the rest of the way. For the season, Ruthven finished 12-7 with a high 5.15 earned run average. Because of the strike, major league baseball split the 1981 season, and two teams from each division made an extra round of playoffs. The Phillies "won" the first-half title, though lost the 1981 National League Division Series to the Montreal Expos in five games, with Ruthven losing Game 2 to the Expos.

In 1982, Ruthven pitched in 33 games (31 starts), accumulating more than 200 innings (204.1) for the fifth time, and his record was 11-11 with an earned run average of 3.79. The Phillies finished second in the division, three games behind the eventual World Champion St. Louis Cardinals.

=== Traded to Cubs and retirement ===
1983 started out terribly for Ruthven, starting out the season with a 1-3 record and a 5.61 earned run average for the Phillies. He was dealt along with Bill Johnson from the Phillies to the Cubs for Willie Hernández on May 22. While the Phillies won the National League pennant that season, the Cubs would finish fifth with a 71-91 record, 19 games behind the Phillies. Ruthven pitched better for the Cubs, going 12-9 with a 4.10 earned run average. 1983 was the last season in which Ruthven won ten or more games.

In 1984, Ruthven began a downward slide in his effectiveness. He started the season as the opening day starter for the Cubs, winning on April 3 against the San Francisco Giants. Even though the Cubs would win the division with 96 victories, Ruthven would win only six games against ten losses, compiled in 23 games (22 starts). His earned run average also ballooned, rising to 5.04. It was his lowest win total since 1975. Ruthven did not appear in the 1984 National League Championship Series, which the Cubs lost in five games to the San Diego Padres.

In 1985, the Cubs slid to 77-84, and Ruthven slid to fifth in their starting rotation. He only made fifteen starts and five relief appearances. The team tried to trade him for Tommy John of the California Angels, but the Angels decided not to make the trade, not wanting to pay Ruthven $400,000 in deferred salary. He finished with a 4-7 record, with a 4.53 earned run average.

In 1986, Ruthven lost his starting spot in the Cubs' rotation. He finished up making only six relief appearances, and his earned run average had risen to 5.06. He appeared in his final major league game on May 1, 1986 at the age of 35. He was released by the Cubs five days later on May 6, ending his major league career.

== Career statistics ==
In a fourteen-season major league career, Ruthven posted a 123-127 record with 1,145 strikeouts and a 4.14 ERA in 2,109 innings pitched, including 17 shutouts and 61 complete games.

He is the father of retired professional soccer player Tyler Ruthven. He is also the brother-in-law of former MLB infielder / outfielder and former baseball television broadcaster Tommy Hutton.

== See also ==
- List of baseball players who went directly to Major League Baseball
