= Alan Bannister =

American baseball player (born 1951)

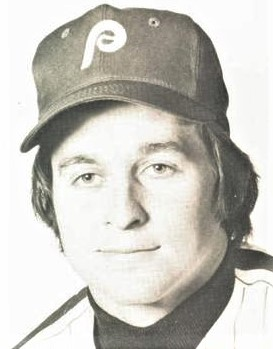
- Outfielder / Infielder
- Born: September 3, 1951 (age 73); Montebello, California, U.S.
- Batted: Right Threw: Right

MLB debut
- July 13, 1974, for the Philadelphia Phillies

Last MLB appearance
- October 6, 1985, for the Texas Rangers

MLB statistics
- Batting average: .270
- Home runs: 19
- Runs batted in: 288
- Stats at Baseball Reference

Teams
- Philadelphia Phillies (1974–1975); Chicago White Sox (1976–1980); Cleveland Indians (1980–1983); Houston Astros (1984); Texas Rangers (1984–1985)
Medals
Men's baseball
Representing United States
Pan American Games
Silver medal – second place	1971 Cali	Team

Alan Bannister (born September 3, 1951) is an American former professional baseball player who played in Major League Baseball for the Philadelphia Phillies (1974–75), Chicago White Sox (1976–80), Cleveland Indians (1980–83), Houston Astros (1984) and Texas Rangers (1984–85). Developed as a shortstop, he became a utility player during his major league career.

== Biography ==
Bannister attended John F. Kennedy High School in La Palma, California and then played college baseball at Arizona State University. He represented the United States at the 1971 Pan American Games, where he won a silver medal. Highly touted in college, Bannister was the Phillies' first-round pick in the 1973 draft (January). Although versatile (he played every position but pitcher and catcher) he never lived up to his college billing and was rarely a regular. He opened the 1975 season as the Phillies' starting center fielder until the arrival of Garry Maddox from the San Francisco Giants on May 4. He was traded with Dick Ruthven and Roy Thomas to the Chicago White Sox for Jim Kaat and Mike Buskey on December 10, 1975. He was the 1977 White Sox' starting shortstop following the trade of Bucky Dent in April, the only season in which he played over 100 games at a position, and he led all American League shortstops in errors (40). That same season he led the AL in sacrifice flies with 11.

In 12 major league seasons he played in 972 games and recorded 3,007 at bats, 430 runs, 811 hits, 143 doubles, 28 triples, 19 home runs, 288 RBI, 108 stolen bases, 292 walks, with a .270 batting average, .334 on-base percentage and a .355 slugging percentage.

After his playing career, he managed two years in the Montreal Expos minor league system and three years for the AZL Giants of the Arizona League. He was inducted to the College Baseball Hall of Fame in 2010.

As an amateur, Bannister was involved in a play which resulted in a fatality. In July 1972, he was a participant in a Baseball Federation tour of Japan. While attempting to complete a double play during a game against a Japanese team, he made a throw to first base which struck the head of Akira Tohmon, who was advancing from first base to second base. Tohmon was knocked unconscious, and later died at a hospital as a result of cerebral contusion.
