= Kevin Bell (baseball) =

American baseball player (born 1955)

- Third baseman
- Born: July 13, 1955 (age 71); Los Angeles, California, U.S.
- Batted: Right Threw: Right

MLB debut
- June 16, 1976, for the Chicago White Sox

Last MLB appearance
- October 3, 1982, for the Oakland Athletics

MLB statistics
- Batting average: .222
- Home runs: 13
- Runs batted in: 64
- Stats at Baseball Reference

Teams
- Chicago White Sox (1976–1980); Oakland Athletics (1982)

Kevin Robert Bell (born July 13, 1955) is an American former professional baseball player who appeared in all or parts of six seasons in Major League Baseball between 1976 and 1982, primarily as a third baseman.

Bell was the first-round pick (7th overall) of the Chicago White Sox in the 1974 Major League Baseball draft. Selected after just one season at Mt. San Antonio College, he was placed on the fast track to the majors, and was the youngest player in the major leagues when he debuted in 1976. On June 22 of that year, he hit a rare inside-the-park grand slam home run against Steve Busby of the Kansas City Royals, and he finished that season with a .248 batting average and 5 home runs in 230 at bats.

Despite his young age, Bell never really developed beyond that. After two more years spent mostly in the minor leagues, he had a season very similar to '76 in 1979, when he batted .245 with 4 home runs in 200 at bats. In 1980, he regressed to a .178 average, and he was released by the White Sox after the season.

Bell was picked up by the San Diego Padres, but before the 1981 season had even begun, he was shipped off to the Oakland Athletics along with two minor leaguers in exchange for pitcher Bob Lacey. One of those minor leaguers would turn out to be long-time A's star Tony Phillips. Bell himself fared less well, getting just 9 more at bats in the majors in 1982 before calling it a career.

== Sources ==
- Career statistics from Baseball Reference · Baseball Reference (Minors) · Retrosheet · Baseball Almanac
