= Silvio Martínez =

Dominican baseball player (born 1955)

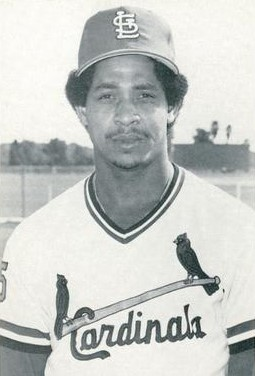
- Pitcher
- Born: August 19, 1955 (age 70); Santiago, Santiago, Dominican Republic
- Batted: Right Threw: Right

MLB debut
- April 9, 1977, for the Chicago White Sox

Last MLB appearance
- October 4, 1981, for the St. Louis Cardinals

MLB statistics
- Win–loss record: 31–32
- Earned run average: 3.88
- Strikeouts: 230
- Stats at Baseball Reference

Teams
- Chicago White Sox (1977); St. Louis Cardinals (1978–1981)
Medals
Men's baseball
Representing Dominican Republic
Central American and Caribbean Games
Silver medal – second place	1974 Santo Domingo	Team

Silvio Ramón Martínez Cabrera (born August 19, 1955) is a Dominican former professional baseball pitcher. Martínez pitched all or part of five seasons in Major League Baseball, from 1977 until 1981, for the Chicago White Sox and St. Louis Cardinals.

Martínez was traded along with Richie Zisk from the Pittsburgh Pirates to the White Sox for Goose Gossage and Terry Forster at the Winter Meetings on December 10, 1976. He pitched mostly as a starting pitcher but he did pick up his lone major league save on August 26, 1977. He pitched 2 scoreless innings to nail down a 4-2 White Sox victory over the Milwaukee Brewers.
