= Jack Brohamer =

American baseball player (born 1950)

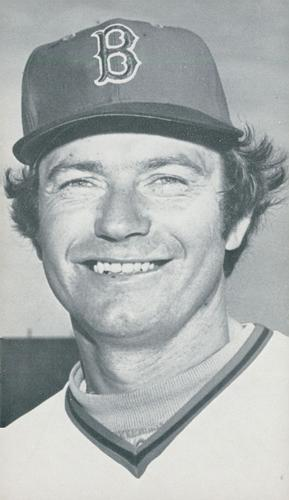
- Second baseman
- Born: February 26, 1950 (age 76); Maywood, California, U.S.
- Batted: Left Threw: Right

MLB debut
- April 18, 1972, for the Cleveland Indians

Last MLB appearance
- September 28, 1980, for the Cleveland Indians

MLB statistics
- Batting average: .245
- Home runs: 30
- Runs batted in: 227
- Stats at Baseball Reference

Teams
- Cleveland Indians (1972–1975); Chicago White Sox (1976–1977); Boston Red Sox (1978–1980); Cleveland Indians (1980)

John Anthony Brohamer (/ˈbroʊhæmər/ BROH-ham-ər; born February 26, 1950) is an American former Major League Baseball (MLB) player. A second baseman (though he also played some third base), he played with the Cleveland Indians, Chicago White Sox, and Boston Red Sox from 1972 to 1980.

== Career ==
Brohamer was drafted by the Cleveland Indians in the 34th round of the 1967 amateur draft. He recorded a base hit in his first major league at-bat on April 18, 1972, as his Indians lost 4–2 to the Red Sox. He was a Cleveland Indians player for four seasons before being traded to the Chicago White Sox for Larvell Blanks on December 12, 1975.

Brohamer played both second and third base while in Chicago, collecting 128 hits over two seasons and hitting for the cycle on September 24, 1977. He is also the only player in MLB history to hit a home run while wearing uniform shorts, having done so off Rudy May in the White Sox's 12-inning 11–10 victory over the Baltimore Orioles at Comiskey Park on August 21, 1976. He signed as a free agent with the Boston Red Sox on November 30, 1977.

His contract was purchased by the Cleveland Indians on June 20, 1980, and Brohamer finished his career with the team that drafted him. His final major league appearance came at Cleveland Stadium on September 28, 1980, going 1-for-4 in a 5–3 loss to the Baltimore Orioles.

== Life after Baseball ==
Brohamer worked for several years in law enforcement for the Oceanside Police Department, eventually becoming a detective sergeant. He and his wife, Helene, raised two sons.

== See also ==
- List of Major League Baseball players to hit for the cycle

Achievements
Preceded by John Mayberry	Hitting for the cycle September 24, 1977	Succeeded by Andre Thornton
