= 1980 Toronto Blue Jays season =

1980 Toronto Blue Jays
- League: American League
- Division: East
- Ballpark: Exhibition Stadium
- City: Toronto
- Record: 67–95 (.414)
- Divisional place: 7th
- Owners: Labatt Breweries, Imperial Trust, Canadian Imperial Bank of Commerce
- General managers: Pat Gillick
- Managers: Bobby Mattick
- Television: CBC Television (Don Chevrier, Whitey Ford, Tony Kubek); CBFT
- Radio: CKFH (Whitey Ford, Early Wynn, Tom Cheek)

The 1980 Toronto Blue Jays season was the franchise's fourth season of Major League Baseball. It resulted in the Blue Jays finishing seventh in the American League East with a record of 67 wins and 95 losses. The season represented a turning point as Bobby Mattick became the second field manager in franchise history.

== Offseason ==
=== Transactions ===
Transactions by the Toronto Blue Jays during the off-season before the 1980 season.

==== October 1979 ====
October 22	Released Dave Freisleben. Released Craig Kusick.

==== November 1979 ====
November 1	Tim Johnson granted free agency. Tony Solaita granted free agency. Acquired Chris Chambliss, Dámaso García and Paul Mirabella from the New York Yankees for Rick Cerone, Tom Underwood and Ted Wilborn.
November 5	Purchased Domingo Ramos from the Texas Rangers. Released Dave McKay.

==== December 1979 ====
December 3	Drafted Mike Macha from the Atlanta Braves in the 1979 MLB Rule 5 draft.
December 4	Drafted Mitch Webster from the Los Angeles Dodgers in the 1979 MLB Rule 5 draft.
December 5	Acquired Barry Bonnell, Joey McLaughlin and Pat Rockett from the Atlanta Braves for Chris Chambliss and Luis Gómez.
December 10	Player rights of Andre Robertson sold to the New York Yankees.

==== January 1980 ====
January 8	Released Dale Mohorcic.
January 10	Signed free agent Jack Kucek from the Philadelphia Phillies to a contract.

==== March 1980 ====
March 17	Acquired Mike Barlow from the California Angels for Mark Wiley.
March 29	Released Rico Carty. Released Steve Luebber.

== Regular season ==
One of the highlights for the 1980 Blue Jays was the emergence of Dave Stieb as a quality starter. Also, on May 4, Otto Vélez hit four home runs in a doubleheader sweep of the Cleveland Indians, including a walk-off shot in the first game.

=== Season standings ===
AL East
Team	W	L	Pct.	GB	Home	Road
New York Yankees	103	59	.636	—	53‍–‍28	50‍–‍31
Baltimore Orioles	100	62	.617	3	50‍–‍31	50‍–‍31
Milwaukee Brewers	86	76	.531	17	40‍–‍42	46‍–‍34
Boston Red Sox	83	77	.519	19	36‍–‍45	47‍–‍32
Detroit Tigers	84	78	.519	19	43‍–‍38	41‍–‍40
Cleveland Indians	79	81	.494	23	44‍–‍35	35‍–‍46
Toronto Blue Jays	67	95	.414	36	35‍–‍46	32‍–‍49

=== Record vs. opponents ===
1980 American League record Sources:
Team	BAL	BOS	CAL	CWS	CLE	DET	KC	MIL	MIN	NYY	OAK	SEA	TEX	TOR
Baltimore	—	8–5	10–2	6–6	6–7	10–3	6–6	7–6	10–2	7–6	7–5	6–6	6–6	11–2
Boston	5–8	—	9–3	6–4	7–6	8–5	5–7	6–7	6–6	3–10	9–3	7–5	5–7	7–6
California	2–10	3–9	—	3–10	4–6	5–7	5–8	6–6	7–6	2–10	3–10	11–2	11–2	3–9
Chicago	6–6	4–6	10–3	—	5–7	2–10	5–8	5–7	5–8	5–7	6–7	6–7	6–7–2	5–7
Cleveland	7–6	6–7	6–4	7–5	—	3–10	5–7	3–10	9–3	5–8	6–6	8–4	6–6	8–5
Detroit	3–10	5–8	7–5	10–2	10–3	—	2–10	7–6	6–6	5–8	6–6	10–2–1	4–8	9–4
Kansas City	6–6	7–5	8–5	8–5	7–5	10–2	—	6–6	5–8	8–4	6–7	7–6	10–3	9–3
Milwaukee	6–7	7–6	6–6	7–5	10–3	6–7	6–6	—	7–5	5–8	7–5	9–3	5–7	5–8
Minnesota	2–10	6–6	6–7	8–5	3–9	6–6	8–5	5–7	—	4–8	6–7	7–6	9–3	7–5
New York	6–7	10–3	10–2	7–5	8–5	8–5	4–8	8–5	8–4	—	8–4	9–3	7–5	10–3
Oakland	5–7	3–9	10–3	7–6	6–6	6–6	7–6	5–7	7–6	4–8	—	8–5	7–6	8–4
Seattle	6–6	5–7	2–11	7–6	4–8	2–10–1	6–7	3–9	6–7	3–9	5–8	—	4–9	6–6
Texas	6–6	7–5	2–11	7–6–2	6–6	8–4	3–10	7–5	3–9	5–7	6–7	9–4	—	7–5
Toronto	2–11	6–7	9–3	7–5	5–8	4–9	3–9	8–5	5–7	3–10	4–8	6–6	5–7	—

=== Opening Day starters ===
- Barry Bonnell
- Rick Bosetti
- Dámaso García
- Alfredo Griffin
- Roy Howell
- John Mayberry
- Dave Stieb
- Otto Vélez
- Ernie Whitt
- Alvis Woods

=== Transactions ===
Transactions for the Toronto Blue Jays during the 1980 regular season.

==== April 1980 ====
April 2	Released Butch Edge.
April 7	Player rights of Mark Lemongello sold to the Chicago Cubs.

==== May 1980 ====
May 28	Player rights of Mike Macha sold to the Detroit Tigers.

==== June 1980 ====
June 3	Traded Dave Lemanczyk to the California Angels for a player to be named later (Ken Schrom on June 10, 1980).
June 6	Purchased Steve Baker from the Detroit Tigers.
June 19	Purchased Charlie Beamon Jr. from the Seattle Mariners.
June 21	Signed free agent Steve Braun from the Kansas City Royals to a contract.

==== July 1980 ====
July 19	Signed amateur free agent Dave Shipanoff.

==== August 1980 ====
August 8	Released Tom Buskey.

==== September 1980 ====
September 3	Released Balor Moore.
September 11	Jesse Jefferson selected by the Pittsburgh Pirates off waivers.

=== Roster ===
1980 Toronto Blue Jays roster
Roster
Pitchers: 46 Mike Barlow; 44 Tom Buskey; 18 Jim Clancy; 36 Jerry Garvin; 34 Jesse Jefferson; 32 Jack Kucek; 48 Luis Leal; 23 Dave Lemanczyk; 50 Joey McLaughlin; 42 Paul Mirabella; 38 Balor Moore; 21 Ken Schrom; 37 Dave Stieb; 40 Jackson Todd; 33,23 Mike Willis	Catchers: 8 Bob Davis; 6 Pat Kelly; 12 Ernie Whitt; Infielders: 25 Doug Ault; 11 Steve Braun; 7 Dámaso García; 4 Alfredo Griffin; 13 Roy Howell; 16 Garth Iorg; 11 Mike Macha; 10 John Mayberry; 17 Domingo Ramos; 26 Willie Upshaw; 19 Otto Vélez	Outfielders: 2 Danny Ainge; 1 Bob Bailor; 9 Barry Bonnell; 22 Rick Bosetti; 30 Joe Cannon; 49 Paul Hodgson; 15 Lloyd Moseby; 20 Alvis Woods	Manager: 3 Bobby Mattick; Coaches: 31 Bobby Doerr (Hitting); 28 John Felske (Bullpen); 14 Denis Menke (First Base); 41 Al Widmar (Pitching); 24 Jimy Williams (Third Base)

=== Game log ===
1980 Game Log 67–95 (Home 35–46, Away 32–49)
April: 9–7 (Home 3–1, Away 6–6)

#	Date	Opponent	Score	Win	Loss	Save	Attendance	Record
1	April 9	@ Mariners	6–8	Parrott (1–0)	Lemanczyk (0–1)	Heaverlo (1)	22,588	0–1
2	April 11	@ Mariners	10–7 (11)	Moore (1–0)	Dressler (0–1)		6,104	1–1
3	April 12	@ Mariners	2–3 (10)	Honeycutt (1–0)	Garvin (0–1)		6,773	1–2
4	April 13	@ Mariners	1–5	Bannister (1–0)	Lemanczyk (0–2)		4,567	1–3
–	April 14	Brewers	Postponed (rain) Rescheduled for July 13					
5	April 16	Brewers	11–2	Stieb (1–0)	Slaton (0–1)		12,688	2–3
6	April 17	Brewers	1–0	Mirabella (1–0)	Sorensen (1–1)		11,235	3–3
7	April 19	@ Indians	1–8	Waits (1–1)	Clancy (0–1)		61,753	3–4
8	April 20	@ Indians	5–3	Lemanczyk (1–2)	Denny (0–2)	McLaughlin (1)	11,220	4–4
9	April 21	@ Royals	7–1	Stieb (2–0)	Gale (0–2)		21,117	5–4
10	April 22	@ Royals	2–7	Splittorff (2–0)	Mirabella (1–1)		16,993	5–5
11	April 23	@ Royals	4–7	Christenson (1–0)	McLaughlin (0–1)	Quisenberry (2)	18,855	5–6
12	April 25	@ Brewers	5–3	McLaughlin (1–1)	Sorensen (1–2)		9,902	6–6
13	April 26	@ Brewers	4–0	Stieb (3–0)	Caldwell (2–1)		11,038	7–6
14	April 27	@ Brewers	8–2	Mirabella (2–1)	Haas (1–3)	Moore (1)	11,099	8–6
–	April 28	Royals	Postponed (rain) Rescheduled for August 8					
15	April 29	Royals	3–1	Clancy (1–1)	Leonard (0–3)		11,553	9–6
16	April 30	Royals	0–3	Gura (3–1)	Jefferson (0–1)		14,029	9–7

May: 13–14 (Home 8–9, Away 5–5)

#	Date	Opponent	Score	Win	Loss	Save	Attendance	Record
17	May 1	Indians	1–2	Denny (1–2)	Lemanczyk (1–3)	Monge (2)	11,654	9–8
18	May 2	Indians	1–6	Barker (3–1)	Stieb (3–1)		14,292	9–9
19	May 3	Indians	8–3	Buskey (1–0)	Waits (1–3)		16,564	10–9
20	May 4	Indians	9–8 (10)	Buskey (2–0)	Monge (0–1)			11–9
21	May 4	Indians	7–2	Jefferson (1–1)	Owchinko (0–3)	McLaughlin (2)	26,114	12–9
22	May 6	@ Angels	3–2	Lemanczyk (2–3)	Aase (3–2)	Garvin (1)	23,804	13–9
23	May 7	@ Angels	7–3	Stieb (4–1)	Knapp (0–2)		21,733	14–9
24	May 8	@ Angels	9–2	Mirabella (3–1)	Frost (3–3)		23,006	15–9
–	May 9	@ Athletics	Postponed (rain) Rescheduled for July 22					
25	May 10	@ Athletics	3–4	Langford (3–1)	Garvin (0–2)		4,925	15–10
26	May 11	@ Athletics	1–12	Norris (5–0)	Lemanczyk (2–4)		7,843	15–11
–	May 13	Mariners	Postponed (rain) Rescheduled for July 26					
27	May 14	Mariners	0–7	Abbott (3–2)	Mirabella (3–2)		13,055	15–12
28	May 15	Mariners	1–0	Clancy (2–1)	Bannister (2–3)		11,579	16–12
29	May 16	Athletics	1–0 (11)	Jefferson (2–1)	Norris (5–1)		16,138	17–12
30	May 17	Athletics	2–4 (14)	Keough (5–3)	McLaughlin (1–2)		23,074	17–13
31	May 18	Athletics	12–1	Mirabella (4–2)	Langford (3–2)		14,414	18–13
32	May 19	Red Sox	7–2	Clancy (3–1)	Billingham (1–1)		32,731	19–13
33	May 20	Red Sox	3–4	Rainey (4–0)	Lemanczyk (2–5)	Burgmeier (7)	18,167	19–14
34	May 21	Red Sox	2–11	Torrez (1–4)	Jefferson (2–2)		19,556	19–15
35	May 22	Yankees	1–5	Griffin (1–2)	Stieb (4–2)		26,047	19–16
36	May 23	Yankees	3–7	Guidry (5–0)	Mirabella (4–3)		24,585	19–17
37	May 24	Yankees	2–6	Tiant (3–2)	Clancy (3–2)	May (3)	31,021	19–18
38	May 25	Yankees	9–6	Leal (1–0)	John (7–2)		33,077	20–18
39	May 26	@ Red Sox	3–1	Garvin (1–2)	Drago (2–2)		18,853	21–18
40	May 27	@ Red Sox	4–5	Renko (3–0)	Buskey (2–1)		16,679	21–19
41	May 28	@ Red Sox	4–1	Stieb (5–2)	Stanley (3–5)	McLaughlin (3)	18,215	22–19
42	May 30	@ Yankees	0–6	Tiant (4–2)	Clancy (3–3)	Gossage (5)	24,319	22–20
43	May 31	@ Yankees	6–8 (11)	May (3–1)	McLaughlin (1–3)		25,158	22–21

June: 10–17 (Home 7–7, Away 3–10)

#	Date	Opponent	Score	Win	Loss	Save	Attendance	Record
44	June 1	@ Yankees	7–11	Underwood (5–3)	Mirabella (4–4)		52,049	22–22
45	June 2	Angels	3–6	Frost (4–3)	Leal (1–1)	LaRoche (3)	15,079	22–23
46	June 3	Angels	7–6 (11)	McLaughlin (2–3)	LaRoche (1–2)		15,589	23–23
47	June 4	Angels	8–2	Clancy (4–3)	Martínez (1–1)		16,677	24–23
–	June 5	@ Twins	Postponed (rain) Rescheduled for June 8					
48	June 6	@ Twins	0–5	Zahn (4–7)	Mirabella (4–5)		5,495	24–24
49	June 7	@ Twins	2–3	Jackson (2–3)	Stieb (5–3)	Corbett (5)	5,375	24–25
50	June 8	@ Twins	1–5	Erickson (1–3)	Jefferson (2–3)	Corbett (6)		24–26
51	June 8	@ Twins	6–4 (13)	McLaughlin (3–3)	Arroyo (0–1)		17,869	25–26
52	June 10	@ White Sox	1–0	Clancy (5–3)	Baumgarten (1–3)		18,225	26–26
53	June 11	@ White Sox	4–7	Kravec (3–4)	Mirabella (4–6)	Farmer (14)	17,537	26–27
54	June 13	Rangers	3–6	Medich (6–3)	Stieb (5–4)	Lyle (6)	20,034	26–28
55	June 14	Rangers	7–6	Buskey (3–1)	Babcock (0–2)		24,184	27–28
56	June 15	Rangers	5–3	Clancy (6–3)	Jenkins (4–5)	Garvin (2)	30,143	28–28
57	June 16	Twins	0–4	Zahn (5–9)	Jefferson (2–4)		14,691	28–29
58	June 17	Twins	6–8	Corbett (4–2)	Mirabella (4–7)		15,229	28–30
59	June 18	White Sox	5–4	Stieb (6–4)	Trout (2–7)			29–30
60	June 18	White Sox	3–1	Kucek (1–0)	Dotson (6–3)	McLaughlin (4)	21,443	30–30
–	June 19	White Sox	Postponed (rain) Rescheduled for September 7					
61	June 20	@ Rangers	2–5	Jenkins (5–5)	Garvin (1–3)		13,747	30–31
62	June 21	@ Rangers	1–2	Matlack (4–3)	McLaughlin (3–4)		17,846	30–32
63	June 22	@ Rangers	6–5 (10)	Garvin (2–3)	Kern (2–9)		13,650	31–32
64	June 24	@ Orioles	0–1	McGregor (7–3)	Stieb (6–5)		14,884	31–33
65	June 25	@ Orioles	3–6	Palmer (7–4)	Leal (1–2)		14,588	31–34
66	June 26	@ Orioles	1–4	Stone (10–3)	Clancy (6–4)		13,023	31–35
67	June 27	Tigers	2–7	Morris (9–6)	Jefferson (2–5)		18,494	31–36
68	June 28	Tigers	3–8	Rozema (4–4)	Kucek (1–1)		20,059	31–37
69	June 29	Tigers	2–0	Stieb (7–5)	Petry (4–4)		22,026	32–37
70	June 30	Orioles	7–9	Stone (11–3)	Leal (1–3)		18,399	32–38

July: 11–17 (Home 5–10, Away 6–7)

#	Date	Opponent	Score	Win	Loss	Save	Attendance	Record
71	July 1	Orioles	0–2	Palmer (8–4)	Clancy (6–5)	Martinez (4)	23,475	32–39
72	July 2	Orioles	2–6	Flanagan (8–6)	Mirabella (4–8)		18,461	32–40
73	July 3	@ Tigers	5–8	Underwood (2–5)	McLaughlin (3–5)		30,027	32–41
74	July 4	@ Tigers	3–4	Petry (5–4)	Stieb (7–6)	López (11)	29,370	32–42
75	July 5	@ Tigers	5–3	Clancy (7–5)	Wilcox (8–5)	Garvin (3)	32,925	33–42
76	July 6	@ Tigers	5–7	Morris (11–6)	Garvin (2–4)	López (12)	28,564	33–43
77	July 10	Indians	3–7	Denny (8–5)	Clancy (7–6)		17,178	33–44
78	July 11	Indians	6–3	Stieb (8–6)	Garland (3–2)		16,621	34–44
79	July 12	Brewers	2–9	Travers (9–3)	Moore (1–1)		23,624	34–45
80	July 13	Brewers	4–1	Kucek (2–1)	Haas (9–8)	Garvin (4)		35–45
81	July 13	Brewers	0–4	Mitchell (1–0)	McLaughlin (3–6)		26,331	35–46
82	July 14	Brewers	4–6	Augustine (2–2)	Clancy (7–7)	Castro (6)	19,443	35–47
83	July 16	@ Mariners	5–0	Stieb (9–6)	Abbott (7–5)		5,644	36–47
84	July 17	@ Mariners	3–5	Rawley (5–3)	Jefferson (2–6)		5,726	36–48
85	July 18	@ Angels	3–6	Halicki (3–1)	Kucek (2–2)	Clear (7)	23,866	36–49
86	July 19	@ Angels	5–4	Clancy (8–7)	Montague (2–2)		35,221	37–49
87	July 20	@ Angels	6–3 (10)	McLaughlin (4–6)	Clear (6–6)		23,903	38–49
88	July 21	@ Athletics	1–0	Stieb (10–6)	Kingman (5–10)		14,588	39–49
89	July 22	@ Athletics	6–2	Jefferson (3–6)	Keough (10–10)	Garvin (5)		40–49
90	July 22	@ Athletics	1–5	Norris (13–6)	Mirabella (4–9)		8,645	40–50
91	July 23	@ Athletics	2–6	McCatty (8–9)	Kucek (2–3)		4,765	40–51
92	July 25	Mariners	5–3	Clancy (9–7)	Honeycutt (8–9)		16,248	41–51
93	July 26	Mariners	2–7	Dressler (1–4)	Stieb (10–7)			41–52
94	July 26	Mariners	7–5	Kucek (3–3)	Abbott (8–6)	Garvin (6)	18,067	42–52
95	July 27	Mariners	5–0	Jefferson (4–6)	Bannister (6–9)		17,080	43–52
96	July 28	Athletics	3–5 (8)	Norris (14–6)	Barlow (0–1)		14,457	43–53
97	July 29	Athletics	5–6 (12)	Lacey (2–1)	Garvin (2–5)		16,704	43–54
98	July 30	Athletics	1–5	Langford (10–9)	Stieb (10–8)		17,654	43–55

August: 11–20 (Home 6–8, Away 5–12)

#	Date	Opponent	Score	Win	Loss	Save	Attendance	Record
99	August 1	Angels	9–8	Garvin (3–5)	Clear (7–9)		16,145	44–55
100	August 2	Angels	4–5	LaRoche (2–2)	Jefferson (4–7)		22,051	44–56
101	August 3	Angels	3–1	Clancy (10–7)	Martinez (2–4)	Barlow (1)	20,404	45–56
102	August 4	@ Indians	5–11	Spillner (9–8)	Mirabella (4–10)	Monge (9)	7,583	45–57
103	August 5	@ Indians	5–8	Grimsley (3–0)	Kucek (3–4)	Cruz (6)	6,707	45–58
104	August 6	@ Indians	2–5	Waits (8–10)	Jefferson (4–8)	Cruz (7)	9,098	45–59
105	August 7	@ Indians	6–7	Monge (1–4)	Garvin (3–6)		9,586	45–60
106	August 8	Royals	0–9	Gale (10–7)	Clancy (10–8)			45–61
107	August 8	Royals	4–7	Pattin (3–0)	Garvin (3–7)		22,146	45–62
108	August 9	Royals	4–3 (14)	Willis (1–0)	Eastwick (0–1)		21,300	46–62
109	August 10	Royals	5–8	Leonard (13–8)	Jefferson (4–9)	Pattin (4)	23,473	46–63
110	August 12	@ Brewers	3–1	Clancy (11–8)	Sorensen (8–8)			47–63
111	August 12	@ Brewers	5–4	Barlow (1–1)	Castro (0–4)	Garvin (7)	18,820	48–63
112	August 13	@ Brewers	4–5	Travers (11–5)	McLaughlin (4–7)		14,304	48–64
113	August 14	@ Brewers	2–4	Haas (14–9)	Stieb (10–9)		21,115	48–65
114	August 15	@ Royals	3–4	Leonard (14–8)	Jefferson (4–10)	Quisenberry (24)	34,861	48–66
115	August 16	@ Royals	5–11	Gura (17–5)	Kucek (3–5)		39,631	48–67
116	August 17	@ Royals	3–8	Splittorff (9–8)	Clancy (11–9)	Quisenberry (25)	30,693	48–68
117	August 19	@ Twins	4–3	Barlow (2–1)	Corbett (8–5)	Schrom (1)	6,902	49–68
118	August 20	@ Twins	10–4	Todd (1–0)	Zahn (10–16)		4,198	50–68
119	August 21	@ White Sox	3–5	Hoyt (5–2)	Jefferson (4–11)	Farmer (21)	15,303	50–69
120	August 22	@ White Sox	0–2	Burns (11–12)	Clancy (11–10)	Farmer (22)	15,033	50–70
121	August 23	@ White Sox	1–5	Dotson (10–8)	Kucek (3–6)		10,768	50–71
122	August 24	@ White Sox	7–3	Stieb (11–9)	Baumgarten (2–8)	Barlow (2)	17,156	51–71
123	August 25	Rangers	1–5	Clay (2–0)	Todd (1–1)	Johnson (2)	15,517	51–72
124	August 26	Rangers	0–8	Hough (2–1)	Jefferson (4–12)		15,478	51–73
125	August 27	Rangers	6–4	Clancy (12–10)	Medich (10–9)	Garvin (8)	15,442	52–73
126	August 28	Twins	5–7 (15) †	Verhoeven (2–3)	Jefferson (4–13)	Williams (1)	14,035	52–74
127	August 29	Twins	2–5	Zahn (11–17)	Stieb (11–10)		14,358	52–75
128	August 30	Twins	3–2	Todd (2–1)	Verhoeven (2–4)		18,376	53–75
129	August 31	Twins	7–1	Clancy (13–10)	Koosman (11–12)		18,029	54–75

September: 10–18 (Home 6–10, Away 4–8)

#	Date	Opponent	Score	Win	Loss	Save	Attendance	Record
130	September 1	@ Rangers	1–9	Medich (11–9)	McLaughlin (4–8)		8,224	54–76
131	September 2	@ Rangers	2–3	Jenkins (12–10)	Leal (1–4)		6,903	54–77
132	September 3	@ Rangers	4–2	Stieb (12–10)	Figueroa (3–9)		6,984	55–77
133	September 4	White Sox	3–2	Todd (3–1)	Farmer (6–8)		12,365	56–77
134	September 5	White Sox	0–3	Hoyt (7–2)	Clancy (13–11)		14,091	56–78
135	September 7	White Sox	3–1	McLaughlin (5–8)	Trout (8–13)	Barlow (3)		57–78
136	September 7	White Sox	7–6	Schrom (1–0)	Proly (3–9)	Barlow (4)	17,457	58–78
137	September 8	Yankees	4–7	John (20–7)	Stieb (12–11)	Gossage (25)	23,020	58–79
138	September 9	Yankees	6–4	Todd (4–1)	Perry (9–11)	Willis (1)	22,471	59–79
139	September 10	Yankees	6–7	Davis (6–3)	Clancy (13–12)	Gossage (26)	23,031	59–80
140	September 11	Orioles	1–6	Stone (23–6)	Mirabella (4–11)		14,025	59–81
141	September 12	Orioles	7–5	McLaughlin (6–8)	Flanagan (14–12)	Willis (2)	15,632	60–81
142	September 13	Orioles	4–6	McGregor (18–7)	Stieb (12–12)	Stoddard (22)	18,043	60–82
143	September 14	Orioles	4–3 (13)	Barlow (3–1)	Martínez (5–4)		19,117	61–82
144	September 16	@ Yankees	4–5	Guidry (14–10)	Clancy (13–13)	Gossage (28)	20,281	61–83
145	September 17	@ Yankees	7–8 (13) ‡	Underwood (13–9)	Kucek (3–7)		22,516	61–84
146	September 18	@ Yankees	2–1	Leal (2–4)	John (21–8)		20,129	62–84
147	September 19	@ Orioles	6–8 (12)	Martinez (3–3)	Willis (1–1)		12,706	62–85
148	September 20	@ Orioles	1–6	Stone (24–7)	Stieb (12–13)		16,269	62–86
149	September 21	@ Orioles	1–2	Flanagan (15–12)	Clancy (13–14)	Stoddard (24)	14,251	62–87
150	September 22	@ Tigers	6–5	Garvin (4–7)	Weaver (2–3)	Willis (3)	6,210	63–87
151	September 23	@ Tigers	9–7	Willis (2–1)	Rozema (6–9)	Kucek (1)	6,363	64–87
152	September 24	@ Tigers	8–9 (10)	Petry (10–9)	Kucek (3–8)		7,129	64–88
153	September 26	Red Sox	1–3	Eckersley (12–13)	Stieb (12–14)		15,187	64–89
154	September 27	Red Sox	3–4	Stanley (10–7)	Clancy (13–15)	Burgmeier (24)	21,533	64–90
155	September 28	Red Sox	3–7	Crawford (2–0)	McLaughlin (6–9)		32,042	64–91
156	September 29	Tigers	2–8	Weaver (3–3)	Mirabella (4–12)	López (21)	12,051	64–92
157	September 30	Tigers	3–5	Schatzeder (11–12)	Todd (4–2)		12,119	64–93

October: 3–2 (Home 0–1, Away 3–1)

#	Date	Opponent	Score	Win	Loss	Save	Attendance	Record
158	October 1	Tigers	7–11	Fidrych (2–3)	Stieb (12–15)	Underwood (5)	12,426	64–94
159	October 2	@ Red Sox	1–4	Tudor (8–5)	Clancy (13–16)		11,872	64–95
–	October 3	@ Red Sox	Postponed (rain) Rescheduled for October 4					
160	October 4	@ Red Sox	7–6 (17)	Leal (3–4)	Stanley (10–8)	Barlow (5)		65–95
161	October 4	@ Red Sox	3–1	Mirabella (5–12)	Drago (7–7)		14,179	66–95
162	October 5	@ Red Sox	4–1	Todd (5–2)	MacWhorter (0–3)		16,562	67–95

† Game suspended due to curfew after the 14th inning. Completed on August 29.
‡ Game suspended due to rain in the top of the 10th inning. Completed on September 18.

== Player stats ==
= Indicates team leader

= Indicates league leader

=== Batting ===
==== Starters by position ====
Note: Pos = Position; G = Games played; AB = At bats; R = Runs scored; H = Hits; 2B = Doubles; 3B = Triples; Avg. = Batting average; HR = Home runs; RBI = Runs batted in; SB = Stolen bases

Pos	Player	G	AB	R	H	2B	3B	Avg.	HR	RBI	SB
C	Ernie Whitt	106	295	23	70	12	2	.237	6	34	1
1B	John Mayberry	149	501	62	124	19	2	.248	30	82	0
2B	Dámaso Garcia	140	543	50	151	30	7	.278	4	46	13
3B	Roy Howell	142	528	51	142	28	9	.269	10	57	0
SS	Alfredo Griffin	155	653	63	166	26	15*	.254	2	41	18
LF	Alvis Woods	109	373	54	112	18	2	.300	15	47	4
CF	Barry Bonnell	130	463	55	124	22	4	.268	13	56	3
RF	Lloyd Moseby	114	389	44	89	24	1	.229	9	46	4
DH	Otto Vélez	104	357	54	96	12	3	.269	20	62	0

- Tied with Willie Wilson (Kansas City) for league lead

==== Other batters ====
Note: G = Games played; AB = At bats; R = Runs scored; H = Hits; 2B = Doubles; 3B = Triples; Avg. = Batting average; HR = Home runs; RBI = Runs batted in; SB = Stolen bases

Player	G	AB	R	H	2B	3B	Avg.	HR	RBI	SB
Bob Bailor	116	347	44	82	14	2	.236	1	16	12
Garth Iorg	80	222	24	55	10	1	.248	2	14	2
Bob Davis	91	218	18	47	11	0	.216	4	19	0
Rick Bosetti	53	188	24	40	7	1	.213	4	18	4
Doug Ault	64	144	12	28	5	1	.194	3	15	0
Danny Ainge	38	111	11	27	6	1	.243	0	4	3
Willie Upshaw	34	61	10	13	3	1	.213	1	5	1
Steve Braun	37	55	4	15	2	0	.273	1	9	0
Joe Cannon	70	50	16	4	0	0	.080	0	4	2
Paul Hodgson	20	41	5	9	0	1	.220	1	5	0
Domingo Ramos	5	16	0	2	0	0	.125	0	0	0
Mike Macha	5	8	0	0	0	0	.000	0	0	0
Pat Kelly	3	7	0	2	0	0	.286	0	0	0

=== Pitching ===
==== Starting pitchers ====
Note: G = Games pitched; GS = Games started; IP = Innings pitched; W = Wins; L = Losses; ERA = Earned run average; R = Runs allowed; ER = Earned runs allowed; BB = Walks allowed; K = Strikeouts

Player	G	GS	IP	W	L	ERA	R	ER	BB	K
Jim Clancy	34	34	250.2	13	16	3.30	108	92	128	152
Dave Stieb	34	32	242.2	12	15	3.71	108	100	83	108
Paul Mirabella	33	22	130.2	5	12	4.34	73	63	66	53
Jackson Todd	12	12	85.0	5	2	4.02	40	38	30	44
Luis Leal	13	10	59.2	3	4	4.53	35	30	31	26
Dave Lemanczyk	10	8	43.1	2	5	5.40	29	26	15	10

==== Other pitchers ====
Note: G = Games pitched; GS = Games started; IP = Innings pitched; W = Wins; L = Losses; SV = Saves; ERA = Earned run average; R = Runs allowed; ER = Earned runs allowed; BB = Walks allowed; K = Strikeouts

Player	G	GS	IP	W	L	SV	ERA	R	ER	BB	K
Joey McLaughlin	55	10	135.2	6	9	4	4.51	79	68	53	70
Jesse Jefferson	29	18	121.2	4	13	0	5.47	78	74	52	53
Jack Kucek	23	12	68.0	3	8	1	6.75	56	51	41	35

==== Relief pitchers ====
Note: G = Games pitched; IP = Innings pitched; W = Wins; L = Losses; SV = Saves; ERA = Earned run average; R = Runs allowed; ER = Earned runs allowed; BB = Walks allowed; K = Strikeouts

Player	G	IP	W	L	SV	ERA	R	ER	BB	K
Jerry Garvin	61	82.2	4	7	8	2.29	23	21	27	52
Mike Barlow	40	55.0	3	1	5	4.09	29	25	21	19
Tom Buskey	33	66.2	3	1	0	4.46	35	33	26	34
Balor Moore	31	64.2	1	1	1	5.29	43	38	31	22
Mike Willis	20	26.1	2	1	3	1.71	6	5	11	14
Ken Schrom	17	31.0	1	0	1	5.23	18	18	19	13
Bob Bailor	3	2.1	0	0	0	7.71	2	2	1	0

== Awards and honours ==
- Dave Stieb, Pitcher of the Month Award, April

All-Star Game

- Dave Stieb

== Farm system ==
Level	Team	League	Manager
AAA	Syracuse Chiefs	International League	Harry Warner
AA	Knoxville Blue Jays	Southern League	Duane Larson
A	Kinston Eagles	Carolina League	Dennis Holmberg
A-Short Season	Utica Blue Jays	New York–Penn League	Larry Hardy
Rookie	Medicine Hat Blue Jays	Pioneer League	John McLaren
