= Rice Owls baseball =

NCAA baseball team

Rice Owls
- 2026 Rice Owls baseball team
- Founded: 1913
- University: Rice University
- Head coach: David Pierce (1st full, 2nd overall season)
- Conference: The American
- Location: Houston, Texas
- Home stadium: Reckling Park (capacity: 7,000)
- Nickname: Owls
- Colors: Blue and gray

College World Series champions
- 2003

College World Series appearances
- 1997, 1999, 2002, 2003, 2006, 2007, 2008

NCAA regional champions
- 1997, 1999, 2001, 2002, 2003, 2005, 2006, 2007, 2008, 2009, 2013

NCAA tournament appearances
- 1995, 1996, 1997, 1998, 1999, 2000, 2001, 2002, 2003, 2004, 2005, 2006, 2007, 2008, 2009, 2010, 2011, 2012, 2013, 2014, 2015, 2016, 2017

Conference tournament champions
- SWC: 1996; WAC: 1997, 1998, 1999; C-USA: 2006, 2007, 2009, 2011, 2013, 2014, 2017

Conference regular season champions
- WAC: 1997, 1998, 1999, 2000, 2001, 2002, 2003, 2004, 2005; C-USA: 2006, 2007, 2008, 2010, 2011, 2012, 2013, 2014, 2015

The Rice Owls baseball team is the interscholastic baseball team representing Rice University in Houston, Texas, United States. The Owls frequently appeared in the NCAA tournament during the tenure of head coach Wayne Graham, which ran from 1992 to 2017. The program participated in every tournament from 1995 through 2017, and won the College World Series in 2003, the first national championship for Rice athletics in any team sport.

Rice is a member of the NCAA Division I American Conference. Previously, it has played in the now-defunct Southwest Conference, the Western Athletic Conference and Conference USA. From 1997–2008, Rice won 12 consecutive regular season titles in its conference or division. Nine of the championships came in the Western Athletic Conference, while the final three came in Conference USA. The streak ended in 2009 when East Carolina won the regular-season conference title; however, Rice won the post-season tournament. Rice subsequently won the 2010, 2011, 2012 and 2013 regular-season C-USA titles.

Rice plays its home games at Reckling Park on the Rice campus in Houston. Rice is also a yearly participant in the Houston College Classic, held since 2001 at the Houston Astros' Daikin Park.

== History ==
=== Conference membership ===
- 1913: Independent
- 1914–1996: Southwest Conference
- 1997–2005: Western Athletic Conference
- 2006–2023: Conference USA
- 2024–present: American Conference

=== Southwest Conference (1914–1996) ===
In 83 years of Southwest Conference play, Rice finished in the bottom half of the conference in 72 times. Rice finished in last place for 24 of those seasons. The highest Rice rankings in SWC regular season play were second-place finishes in 1984 and 1994.

=== The Wayne Graham Era (1992–2018) ===
The modern era of Rice baseball began in 1992, when Wayne Graham, who had previously led San Jacinto College to five junior college championships, became head coach. Graham has coached 27 different players to All-America honors. In 1995, Rice finally broke through to make the first NCAA tournament appearance in school history—the first of 20 consecutive tournament appearances, including seven College World Series.

A year later, Rice won the 1996 Southwest Conference baseball tournament, the final SWC tournament. It would be the first of 19 consecutive regular-season or tournament titles in three different conferences.

In 2008, Baseball America ranked Rice as the best baseball program in a nine-year survey of all 293 Division I programs since 1999. Data cited in the survey included Rice's five College World Series appearances and 2003 championship, its 35 major-league draft picks, and its 15 All-America selections over that span. Graham whose 953 victories over 21 seasons make him both the winningest and longest-tenured coach in Rice history.

==== 2003 national championship ====
We're only a step away from being the capital city of the capital state of the baseball world. This is going to be the greatest baseball city in the country and the world... I want Rice University to be Houston's team.

— Owls head coach Wayne Graham in 2003

Rice entered the 2003 postseason having won 30 consecutive games early in the season and having won the WAC regular-season championship. The team had a 3–0 record in the regional round, defeating McNeese State once and Wichita State twice at Reckling Park to advance to the super regionals. In the super regionals, Rice faced off against cross-town rival Houston. In the regular season, Rice had beaten the Cougars in four of five games. After losing the first game, 5–2, Rice rallied to win the second game, 10–2, behind four home runs, including a three-run homer by Vincent Sinisi. Rice advanced to their second consecutive College World Series by winning, 5–2, in game 3.

Rice entered the 2003 College World Series with a starting rotation made up of three sophomore pitchers: Jeff Niemann, Wade Townsend, and Philip Humber. Rice won its first three games in the tournament– a 4–2 win over Southwest Missouri State (now Missouri State University), a 12–2 defeat of defending champion Texas, and a second victory over Texas to advance to the championship round. Texas had already lost to Rice, 2–1, earlier in the season. The Owls defeated Texas on catcher Justin Ruchti's RBI single in the bottom of the ninth inning against closer Huston Street. The Owls' two wins against Texas was a change of outcome from the previous CWS, where Texas had beaten Rice in their opening game.

In the best-of-three championship series, Rice played against Stanford. Rice won the first game with its second consecutive walk-off victory, as Chris Kolkhorst scored from second on a throwing error in the bottom of the 10th inning to win, 4–3. Stanford rallied in the second game the next night to win, 8–3, but the Owls defeated the Cardinal in the final game, 14–2, to win Rice's first national championship in a team sport. Each member of the Owls pitching rotation pitched in the championship series; Niemann recovered from three early runs to pitch seven scoreless innings in game one, Townsend pitched well in game two despite two seventh-inning errors, and Humber threw a complete-game five-hitter to win game three.

After the championship series, the Owls were honored in a parade by the city of Houston. The University commissioned a painting of the championship to sell to fans and alumni that is still available in print form. The team also visited the White House, where then-President George W. Bush recalled watching Rice games in his youth and commended the team for their accomplishments.

== Stadium ==
Reckling Park is the baseball stadium at Rice University in Houston, Texas, USA. It has a capacity of 5,368 and serves as the home field of the Rice Owls baseball team. The stadium was built on the site of Cameron Field, Rice's home from 1978–99, in time for the 2000 season.

== Head coaches ==
Coach	Years	Record	Conference record
David Pierce	2025-present	13–22	10–17
José Cruz Jr.	2022–2025	63–136	29–58
Matt Bragga	2019–2021	51–76–1	25–36–1
Wayne Graham	1992–2018	1,173–528–2	531–244–2
David Hall	1981–1991	338–267	85–145
Doug Osburn	1963–1980	270–332	122–215
Joe Gallagher	1962	10–12	4–9
Dell Morgan	1953–1961	77–113–1	52–76
Harold Stockbridge	1949–1952	29–38	10–33
Jess Neely	1945, 1948	13–26–1	9–16
Cecil Grigg	1936–44, 1946–1947	60–139–5	36–101
John Neimic	1931–1932	13–17	12–12
Danny Allnoch	1930	???	5–12
Gene Bailey	1929	9–16	7–14
Charley Schwartz	1928	3–7	3–7
Dickey Kerr	1928	???	9–21
Joe Bedenk	1925–1927	23-28	17-26
Michael O'Neill	1924	4–12	3–11
Bob Countryman	1922–1923	6–14	4–12
Pete Cawthon	1920–1921	???	4–18
Jack Coombs	1918	6–8	0–2
Philip Arbuckle	1913–1917	26–38–2	8–24–1

== Rivalries ==
=== Houston ===
Since their first meeting in 1948, Rice has played Houston 191 times. They have met for each of the past 37 seasons. Since 1998, the season-long series between these two teams has been known as the Silver Glove series. Through the 2021 season, Rice leads the all-time series against their cross-town rivals by a record of 108–83.

=== Texas ===
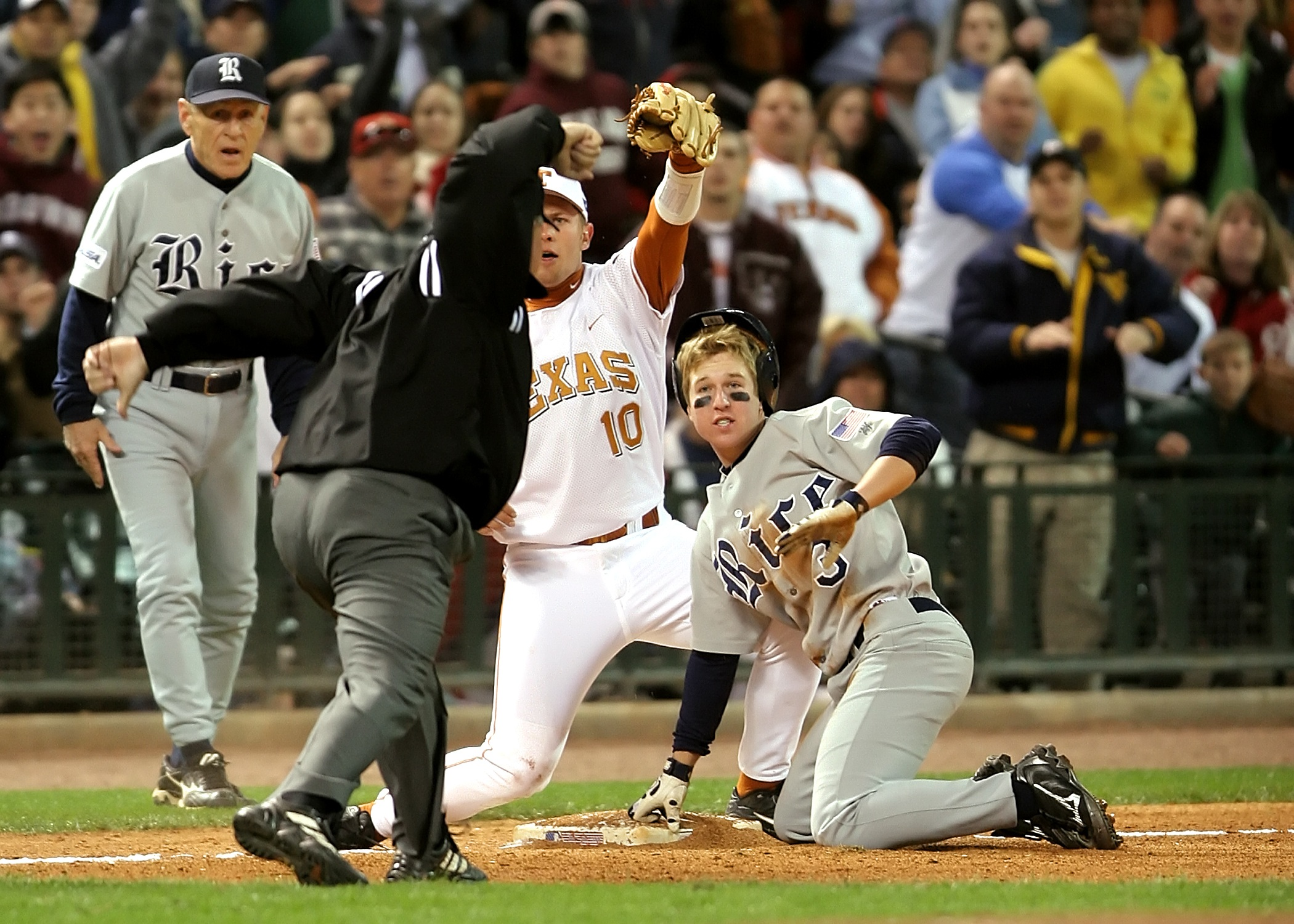
A game between Texas and Rice in 2006

Rice first played Texas in 1915, the first year of the Southwest Conference. Rice went 0–4 that first year, starting a trend of lopsided season series that lasted for 40 years, including no wins against the Longhorns for 12 years. Rice finally won two consecutive season series in 1955 and '56, and again in 1972 and '73. The only other Rice season series win before Wayne Graham came to Rice was 1978.

One notable win came in 1977, as Texas began the season with 34 consecutive wins, which was snapped by a 4–3 loss to the Owls in extra innings. This Texas record still stands today.

Since Graham arrived on South Main in 1994, the two teams have played more evenly, going 15–17 in that span. During Rice's resurgence, Rice and Texas have met twice in the College World Series. In 2002, Texas handed Rice a first-round loss. In 2003, however, Rice turned the tables, defeating the Longhorns twice en route to their eventual championship.

Since their end-of-the-season meetings in 2002 and 2003, the rivalry has been acknowledged as one of the most tense rivalries in college baseball. In the run up to the 2004 Minute Maid College Classic, The Daily Texan likened the Rice-Texas rivalry to the college basketball matchup between North Carolina and Duke, one of college sport's most famed rivalries. Factors contributing to the continued rivalry between the two schools include their proximity to one another, as well as the fact that many of their players compete together in summer leagues.

== Former players ==
Rice has sent more than 20 players on to the major leagues. Most notable among these are All-Star pitcher Norm Charlton, Gold Glover José Cruz Jr., Perfect game pitcher Philip Humber of the Houston Astros, five-time All-Star and Astros outfielder Lance Berkman and 2019 first team All-MLB third baseman Anthony Rendon.

In 2004, Rice became the first school ever to have three players selected in the first round of the MLB draft when Philip Humber, Jeff Niemann, and Wade Townsend were selected third, fourth, and eighth, respectively.

=== List of Rice Owls in Major League Baseball ===
**Active players in bold.**

- David Aardsma (2004–2015)
- Matt Anderson (1998–2005)
- Jim Asbell (1938)
- Phil Barzilla (2006)
- Lance Berkman (1999–2013)
- Tim Byrdak (1998–2013)
- Frank Carswell (1953)
- **J.T. Chargois** (2016-)
- Tony Cingrani (2012-)
- Norm Charlton (1988–2001)
- Bubba Crosby (2003–2006)
- José Cruz Jr. (1997–2008)
- **Jon Duplantier** (2019-)
- **Tyler Duffey** (2015-)
- Eddie Dyer (1922–1927)
- Josh Geer (2008–2009)
- **Tristan Gray** (2022-)
- Marcus Gwyn (2007)
- Dave Hilton (1972–1975)
- Brock Holt (2012-)
- Philip Humber (2006–2016)
- Paul Janish (2008–2017)
- Kevin Joseph (2002)
- **Evan Kravetz** (2024-)
- Matt Langwell (2013)
- **Lucas Luetge** (2012-)
- Mike Macha (1979–1980)
- **Dane Myers** (2023-)
- Jeff Niemann (2008–2012)
- Glenn Otto (2021-)
- Dave Pavlas (1990–1996)
- Lance Pendleton (2011)
- Bryan Price (2014)
- Ford Proctor (2022-)
- Mark Quinn (1999–2002)
- Allan Ramirez (1983)
- Mario Ramos (2003)
- **Anthony Rendon** (2013-)
- Josh Rodriguez (2011)
- Joe Savery (2011–2013)
- Craig Stansberry (2007–2009)
- Matt Williams (1983–1985)
- Joe Wood (1943)

=== List of Rice Owls First-Round Draft Choices ===
- 1967 - Ronald Henson
- 1979 - Mike Macha
- 1981 - Matt Williams (5th overall)
- 1984 - Norm Charlton (28th overall)
- 1995 - Jose Cruz Jr. (3rd overall)
- 1997 - Matt Anderson (1st overall), Lance Berkman (16th overall)
- 1998 - Bubba Crosby (22nd overall)
- 2001 - Kenny Baugh (11th overall), Jon Skaggs (42nd overall)
- 2003 - David Aardsma (22nd overall)
- 2004 - Philip Humber (3rd overall), Jeff Niemann (4th overall), Wade Townsend (8th overall)
- 2005 - Wade Townsend (8th overall)
- 2007 - Joe Savery (19th overall)
- 2008 - Bryan Price (45th overall)
- 2011 - Anthony Rendon (6th overall)

== See also ==
- List of NCAA Division I baseball programs
- Rice Owls
