= Newton Falls Exempted Village School District =

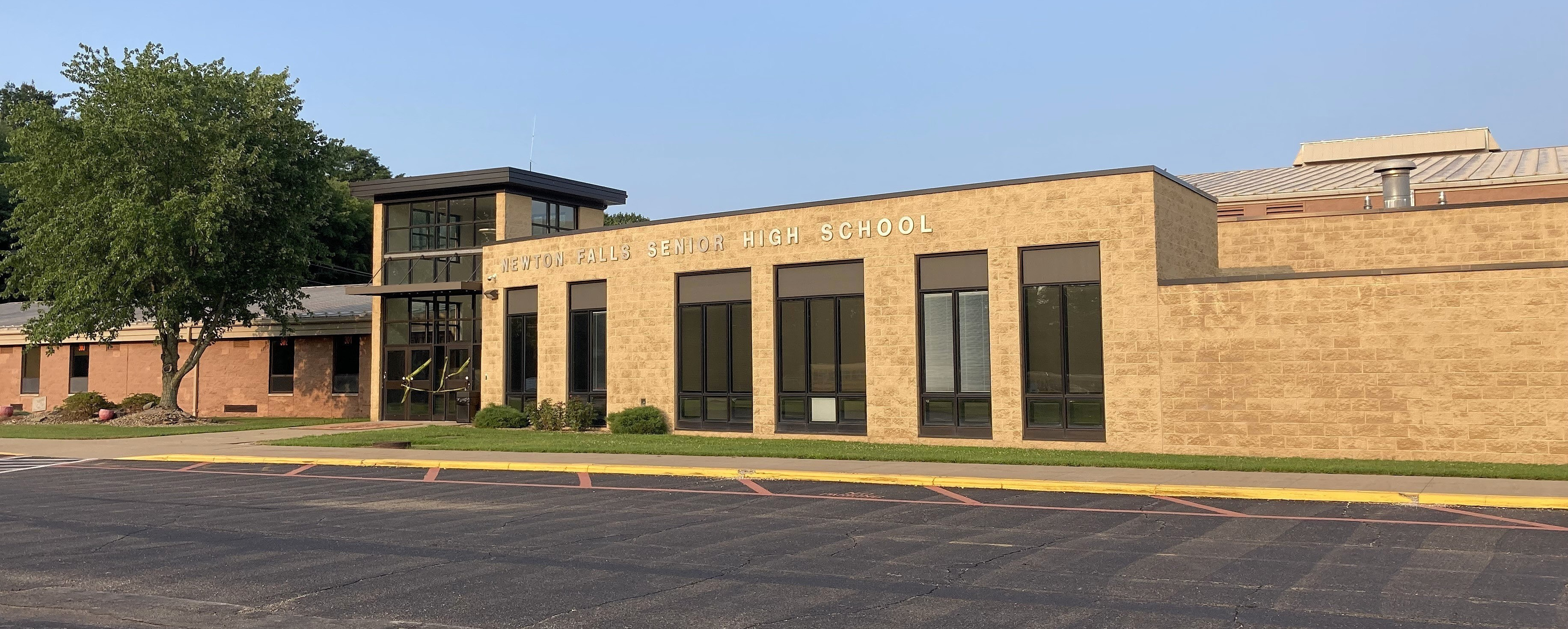
- Newton Falls Junior/Senior High School

Location
- 909 1/2 Milton Blvd; Newton Falls, Trumbull, Ohio, 44444; United States

Information
- School type: Public
- Established: 1931
- NCES District ID: 3904556
- Superintendent: Dr. Andreas Johansson, PhD
- Teaching staff: 52.13
- Grades: K-12
- Enrollment: 805 (2024-25)
- Student to teacher ratio: 15:44
- Colors: Orange and Black
- Mascot: Tigers
- Website: District Website

The Newton Falls Exempted Village School District is a school district located in Newton Falls, Trumbull County, Ohio, United States. The school district serves one high school, one junior high school, one middle school and one elementary school. The junior/senior High School are all located within one building on 907 Milton Blvd, while the Elementary and Middle School share the same building adjacent to the Junior/High School.

== History ==
The Newton Falls Exempted Village School District formed in 1931. The original high school building was built in 1920.

In 1971, Newton Falls Middle School was constructed, accommodating grades three through six. It was closed in 2006 and a new campus was built on the current junior/senior high school campus.

on May 31, 1985, an F5 Tornado swept through several towns across Ohio and Pennsylvania, including Newton Falls. The original high school, located on Center St, was destroyed. It was rebuilt the following year on its current Junior/Senior high school campus Milton Blvd campus.

Arlington Elementary School, which was built in 1929, was demolished in 2008, with the move of all Elementary students to the middle school campus.

== Schools ==
=== High School ===
Newton Falls Junior/Senior High School

=== Middle School ===
Newton Falls Middle School

=== Elementary School ===
Newton Falls Elementary School

=== Former Schools ===
Arlington Elementary School

== Notable alumni ==
- Jack Kucek, former professional baseball player in the Major League Baseball (MLB)
- Earnie Shavers, former professional boxer
- Patti Cooksey, Jockey HOF Road in Kentucky Derby and Preakness
