= Newton Falls, Ohio =

- Village
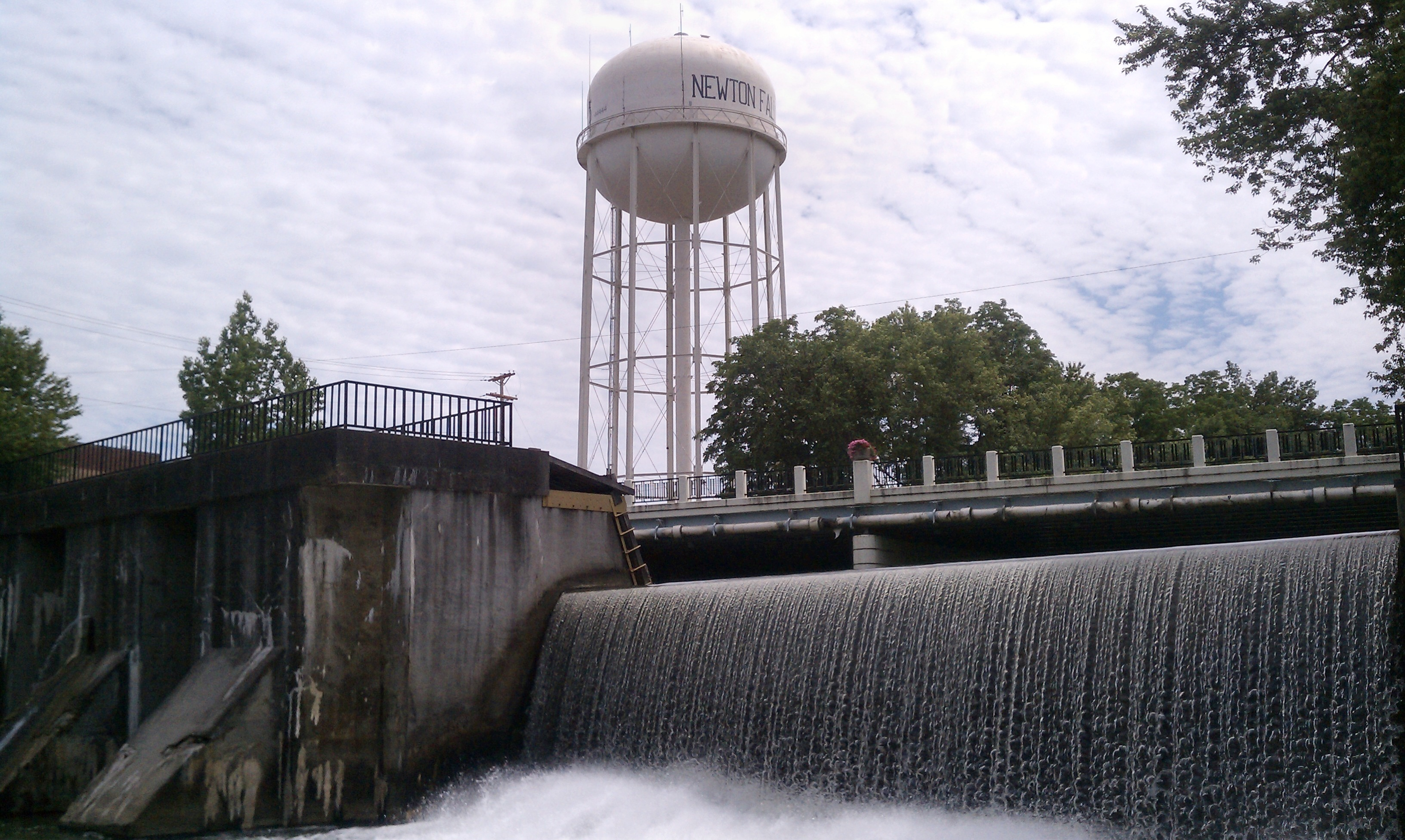
- Water tower and dam in Newton Falls
- Motto: "Working toward a better tomorrow!"
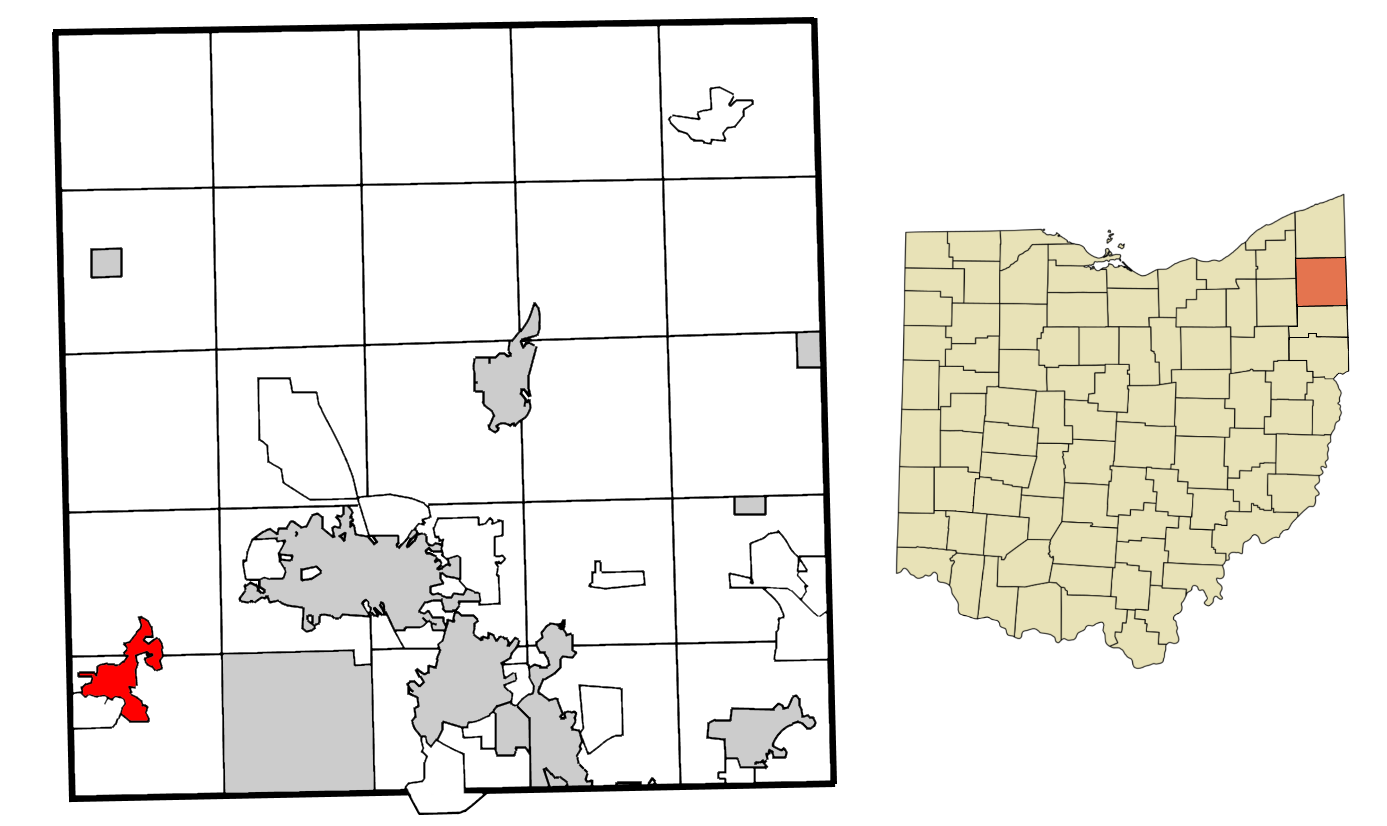
- Location of Newton Falls in Trumbull County, Ohio.
- Coordinates: 41°11′36″N 80°58′00″W
- Country: United States
- State: Ohio
- County: Trumbull

Government
  - Type: Council–manager

Area
  - Total: 2.39 sq mi (6.19 km^{2})
  - Land: 2.31 sq mi (5.98 km^{2})
  - Water: 0.081 sq mi (0.21 km^{2})
- Elevation: 915 ft (279 m)

Population (2020)
  - Total: 4,557
  - Density: 1,970/sq mi (762/km^{2})
- Time zone: UTC-5 (Eastern (EST))
  - Summer (DST): UTC-4 (EDT)
- ZIP code: 44444
- Area codes: 234/330
- FIPS code: 39-55650
- GNIS feature ID: 2395230
- Website: http://ci.newtonfalls.oh.us/

Newton Falls is a village in southwestern Trumbull County, Ohio, United States. The population was 4,557 at the 2020 census. It is part of the Youngstown–Warren metropolitan area. The city takes its name from the two sets of waterfalls within the village, each on different branches of the Mahoning River. The city is known for its notable ZIP code (44444) and for its covered bridge, which is the second oldest in the state of Ohio.

== History ==
It is believed that early property owners of Newton Township spent time in Newtown, Connecticut before departing for the Ohio Country and that the name Newton may be a corruption of Newtown. The village's name stems from its location on the falls on the Mahoning River. It grew into a home of the steel manufacturing industry, as did much of the region, aided by its location along the river and the proximity of the nearby Ravenna Training and Logistics Site.

On May 31, 1985, an F5 tornado struck the city as part of the 1985 United States-Canadian tornado outbreak, a deadly series of tornadoes that swept through Ohio, Pennsylvania, New York, and Ontario. The tornado that hit Newton Falls was the only F5 in Ohio that day, and damaged most of the downtown, destroying many homes and businesses, and damaging the senior and junior high schools (it destroyed the gymnasium and rendered the junior high unusable). There were between 70 and 80 injuries, and 400 families were left homeless. The Ohio Army National Guard credited warning sirens for the lack of fatalities. A monument was erected in 2022 memorializing the devastation. It is situated at the corner of Broad and Center Streets.

== Geography ==
According to the United States Census Bureau, the village has a total area of 2.39 square miles (6.19 km^{2}), of which 2.31 square miles (5.98 km^{2}) is land and 0.08 square miles (0.21 km^{2}) is water.

The Mahoning River flows through Newton Falls.

== Demographics ==
Historical population
Census	Pop.	Note	%±
1880	575		—
1890	698		21.4%
1900	732		4.9%
1910	757		3.4%
1920	1,100		45.3%
1930	3,458		214.4%
1940	3,120		−9.8%
1950	4,451		42.7%
1960	5,038		13.2%
1970	5,378		6.7%
1980	4,960		−7.8%
1990	4,866		−1.9%
2000	5,002		2.8%
2010	4,795		−4.1%
2020	4,557		−5.0%
U.S. Decennial Census

=== 2020 census ===
As of the 2020 census, Newton Falls had a population of 4,557. The median age was 45.3 years. 17.9% of residents were under the age of 18 and 23.4% of residents were 65 years of age or older. For every 100 females there were 97.1 males, and for every 100 females age 18 and over there were 93.6 males age 18 and over.

100.0% of residents lived in urban areas, while 0.0% lived in rural areas.

There were 2,149 households in Newton Falls, of which 22.7% had children under the age of 18 living in them. Of all households, 33.1% were married-couple households, 24.5% were households with a male householder and no spouse or partner present, and 32.2% were households with a female householder and no spouse or partner present. About 41.6% of all households were made up of individuals and 18.8% had someone living alone who was 65 years of age or older.

There were 2,382 housing units, of which 9.8% were vacant. The homeowner vacancy rate was 1.7% and the rental vacancy rate was 10.5%.

Racial composition as of the 2020 census
Race	Number	Percent
White	4,256	93.4%
Black or African American	38	0.8%
American Indian and Alaska Native	6	0.1%
Asian	13	0.3%
Native Hawaiian and Other Pacific Islander	0	0.0%
Some other race	10	0.2%
Two or more races	234	5.1%
Hispanic or Latino (of any race)	53	1.2%

=== 2010 census ===
As of the census of 2010, there were 4,795 people, 2,064 households, and 1,236 families residing in the village. The population density was 2,075.8 inhabitants per square mile (801.5/km^{2}). There were 2,395 housing units at an average density of 1,036.8 per square mile (400.3/km^{2}). The racial makeup of the village was 97.6% White, 0.8% African American, 0.1% Native American, 0.1% Asian, 0.2% from other races, and 1.2% from two or more races. Hispanic or Latino of any race were 1.1% of the population.

There were 2,064 households, of which 29.3% had children under the age of 18 living with them, 41.9% were married couples living together, 13.9% had a female householder with no husband present, 4.1% had a male householder with no wife present, and 40.1% were non-families. 34.8% of all households were made up of individuals, and 15.2% had someone living alone who was 65 years of age or older. The average household size was 2.30 and the average family size was 2.98.

The median age in the village was 40 years. 23.4% of residents were under the age of 18; 7.8% were between the ages of 18 and 24; 25.3% were from 25 to 44; 26.4% were from 45 to 64; and 17.1% were 65 years of age or older. The gender makeup of the village was 47.5% male and 52.5% female.

=== 2000 census ===
As of the census of 2000, there were 5,002 people, 2,171 households, and 1,346 families residing in the city. The population density was 2,193.1 inhabitants per square mile (846.8/km^{2}). There were 2,376 housing units at an average density of 1,041.7 per square mile (402.2/km^{2}). The racial makeup of the city was 98.10% White, 0.38% African American, 0.42% Native American, 0.06% Asian, 0.04% Pacific Islander, 0.24% from other races, and 0.76% from two or more races. Hispanic or Latino of any race were 0.64% of the population.

There were 2,171 households, out of which 28.9% had children under the age of 18 living with them, 46.1% were married couples living together, 12.1% had a female householder with no husband present, and 38.0% were non-families. 33.3% of all households were made up of individuals, and 14.9% had someone living alone who was 65 years of age or older. The average household size was 2.30 and the average family size was 2.95.

In the village the population was spread out, with 24.8% under the age of 18, 8.0% from 18 to 24, 29.1% from 25 to 44, 22.2% from 45 to 64, and 15.9% who were 65 years of age or older. The median age was 37 years. For every 100 females there were 89.2 males. For every 100 females age 18 and over, there were 85.7 males.

The median income for a household in the village was $32,827, and the median income for a family was $41,250. Males had a median income of $34,067 versus $21,992 for females. The per capita income for the village was $16,039. About 8.1% of families and 10.5% of the population were below the poverty line, including 18.8% of those under age 18 and 4.5% of those age 65 or over.

== Arts and culture ==
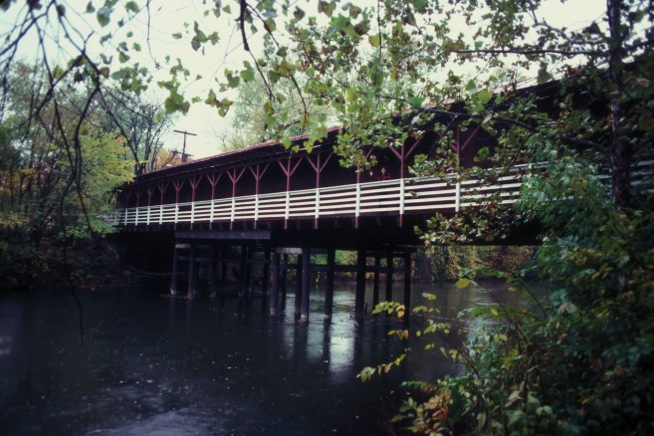
Newton Falls Covered Bridge

Newton Falls is home to the early 19th-century Newton Falls covered bridge, which was constructed over the Mahoning River in 1831. A walkway was added to the side of the bridge in 1921–1922. In 1985 the bridge was repaired after being damaged by the Niles/Wheatland tornado. In December 2007 the bridge was reopened after a two-year restoration funded by government grants. In July 2009 a delivery truck damaged the bridge and rendered it out of service until repairs could be made. It reopened in 2010. The Newton Falls bridge is considered the second oldest existing covered bridge in Ohio, the oldest covered bridge in use on its original site, the only covered bridge in the state with a covered crosswalk, and the last surviving covered bridge in Trumbull County. Built on the Town Lattice truss plan, the bridge is 123 feet long and twenty-four feet wide. It has a clear span of 101 1/2 feet and a sixteen-foot-wide roadway.

== Government ==
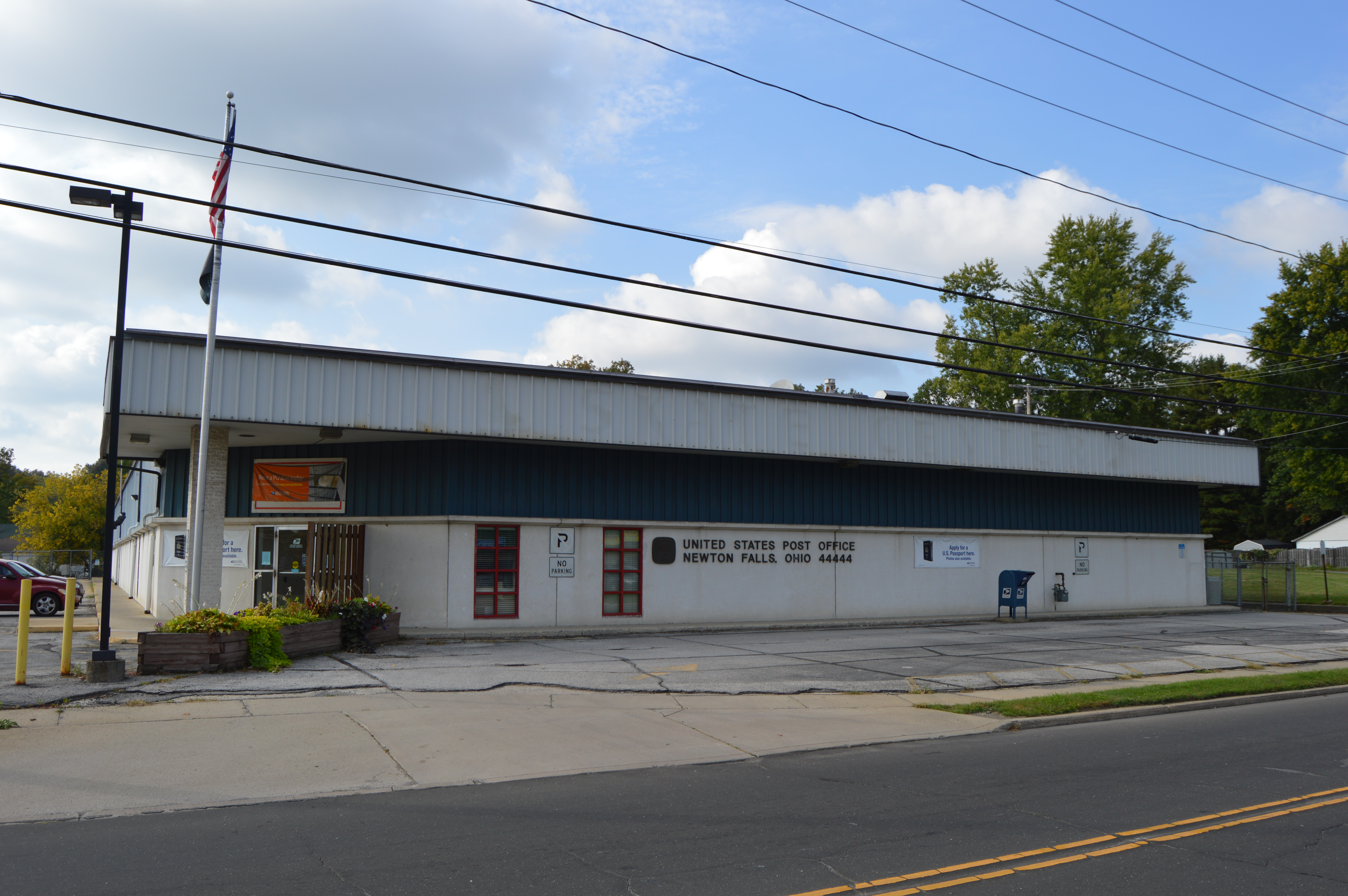
The Newton Falls post office bears the ZIP code 44444.

The village government consists of five elected city councilmen (four representing different wards, one at-large), an elected mayor (who serves on the council and votes in the event of a tie), and a village manager. The council meets on the first and third Wednesday of the month at 6:00 pm in the Council Chambers of the administration building. All members of the council are elected via the variant of the two-round system known as a nonpartisan primary.

- Mayor: David Hanson
- Ward 1: Brian Kropp
- Ward 2: Brian Axiotis
- Ward 3: Robert Burke
- Ward 4: Kevin Rufener
- At-Large: Julie Stimpert
- Village Manager: Mike Novotny (interim)

== Education ==
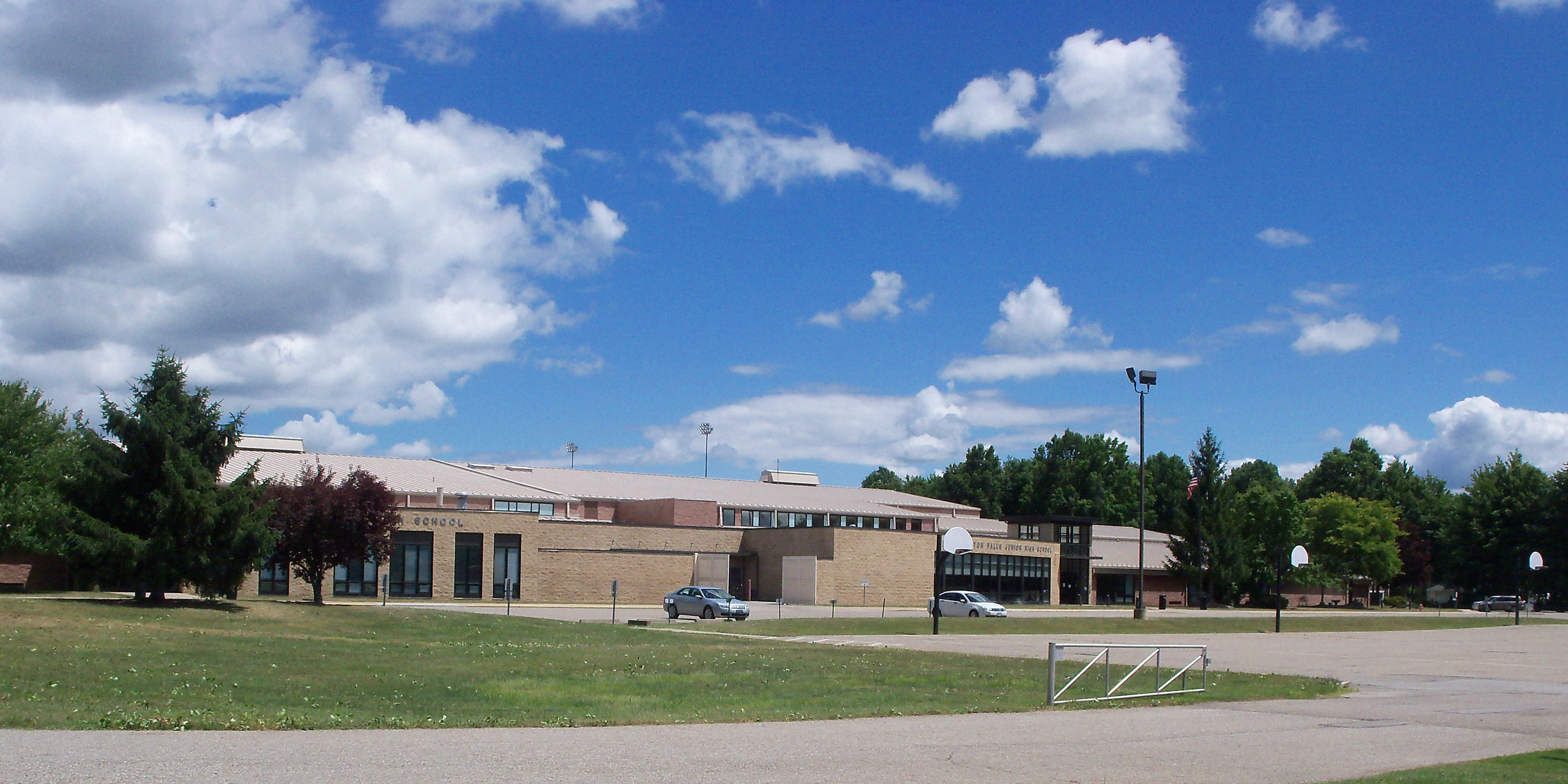
Newton Falls High School

Newton Falls is served by the Newton Falls Exempted Village Schools district. The current schools serving Newton Falls include:

- Newton Falls Elementary/Middle School – grades K-5
- Newton Falls Junior/Senior High School – grades 6-12

== Media ==
Newspapers published in Newton Falls include:

- The Bridge (defunct)
- The Newton Falls Herald (defunct)
- The Review
- The Weekly Villager

== Transportation ==
Major highways that pass through the village include:

- Interstate 80 (Ohio Turnpike)
- State Route 5
- State Route 534

The Baltimore & Ohio's Pittsburgh to Chicago main line ran through the town. "The Tower", a historic train station, was demolished in 2011 after suffering extensive damage in a train derailment.

== Notable people ==
- Clara Louise Bell, artist
- Patricia Cooksey, horse jockey
- Edward H. Ives, Wisconsin State Senator
- Jack Kucek, major league baseball player
- Earnie Shavers, heavyweight boxing contender
