= Newton Falls High School =

Coordinates: 41.1771°N 80.9613°W

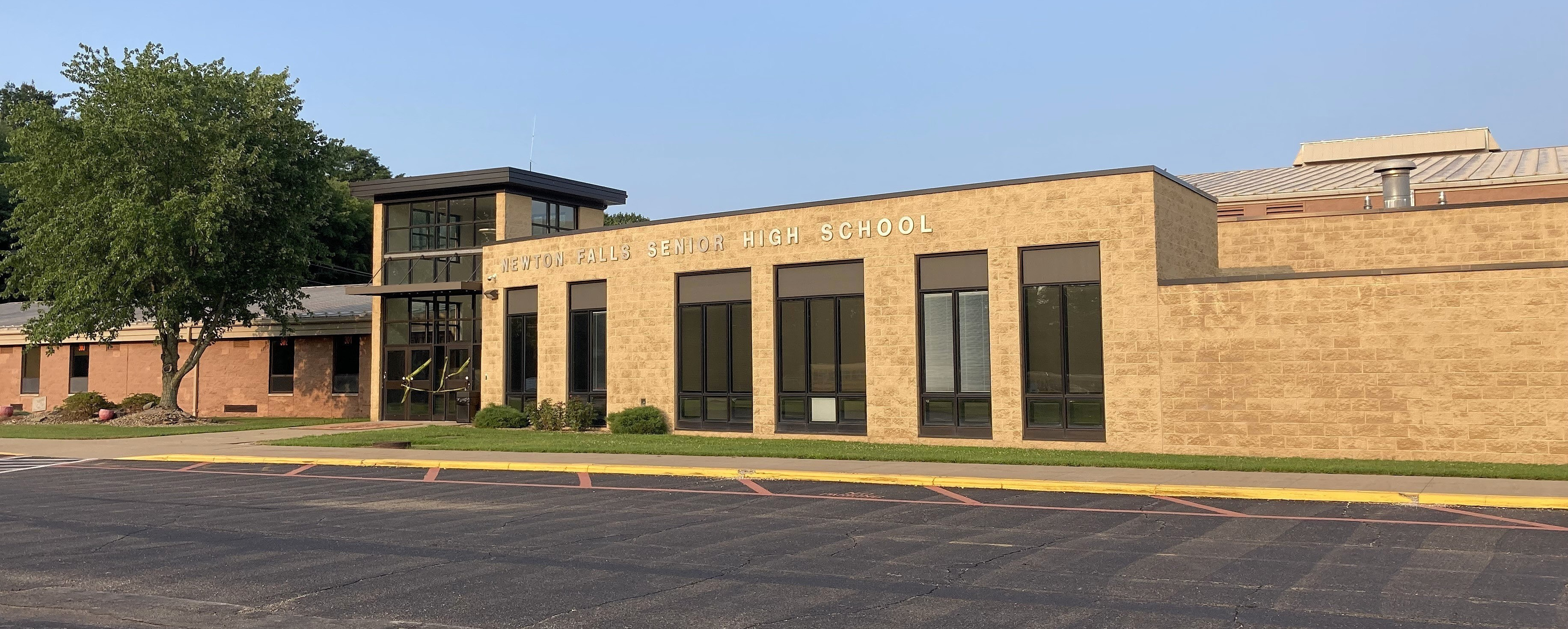

Location
- 907 Milton Blvd; Newton Falls, Trumbull, Ohio, 44444; United States

Information
- School type: Public
- Established: c. 1860s
- School district: Newton Falls Exempted Village School District
- NCES School ID: 390455602281
- Principal: Melissa Malone
- Teaching staff: 15.37 (on an FTE basis)
- Grades: 9–12
- Enrollment: 245 (2024–25)
- Student to teacher ratio: 15.94
- Colors: Orange and Black
- Athletics conference: Mahoning Valley Athletic Conference
- Mascot: Tigers
- Website: District Website

Newton Falls High School is a public high school located in Newton Falls, Ohio, United States. It is the only high school in the Newton Falls Exempted Village School District. Athletic teams are known as the Tigers, and they compete in the Mahoning Valley Athletic Conference as a member of the Ohio High School Athletic Association.

== History ==
Newton Falls High School established sometime in the 1860s, when a union facility opened on Center Street. Newton Falls High Schools first commencement was held in 1878.

A new high school building was constructed on Center Street in 1920. In 1931, Newton Falls Exempted Village School District was formally created, officially placing the high school under the supervision of the school board.

On May 31, 1985, the Newton Falls area was struck by the devastating tornado outbreak that affected portions of Ohio and Pennsylvania. The storm destroyed the districts junior high school and caused major damage to the Center Street high school building, especially to the high school gymnasium. Following the tornado's destruction, Newton Falls current high school campus was built on Milton Boulevard, along with an elementary school being built adjacent to the property in 1987.

== Athletics ==
Newton Falls High School offers:

- Baseball
- Basketball
- Cross country
- Cheerleading
- Golf
- Girls' flag football
- Football
- Track and field
- Soccer
- Softball
- Volleyball

=== Facilities ===
==== Newton Falls Stadium ====
Newton Falls Stadium, located behind the high school, features an all-season outdoor track, with a grass playing surface, and holds a seating compacity of 3,033, and is used by the high school's football, soccer and track and field teams.

== Notable alumni ==
- Jack Kucek, former MLB pitcher
- Earnie Shavers, former professional boxer
- Patti Cooksey, Jockey HOF Road in Kentucky Derby and Preakness
