= Mike Macha =

American baseball player (born 1954)

- Third baseman
- Born: February 17, 1954 (age 72); Victoria, Texas, U.S.
- Batted: Right Threw: Right

MLB debut
- April 20, 1979, for the Atlanta Braves

Last MLB appearance
- May 26, 1980, for the Toronto Blue Jays

MLB statistics
- Batting average: .095
- Home runs: 0
- Runs batted in: 1
- Stats at Baseball Reference

Teams
- Atlanta Braves (1979); Toronto Blue Jays (1980)

Michael William Macha (born February 17, 1954) is an American former professional baseball player. He played in Major League Baseball (MLB) for the Atlanta Braves and Toronto Blue Jays.

== Career ==
At first, he was drafted in the 5th round (103rd overall) of the 1975 amateur entry draft by the Cleveland Indians, but opted not to sign. He was then drafted in the first round (10th pick) of the 1976 amateur draft by the Atlanta Braves.

Macha's batting average gradually rose during his minor league tenure, and it rose high enough to make the Braves call him up in 1979 when he was 25 years old. He made his major league debut on April 20, 1979. He did not fare well in his first major league stint, hitting only .154 (2 for 13), and committing 3 errors at third base in only 13 chances. He was sent back to the minors by mid-May.

In late 1979, Macha was selected by the Toronto Blue Jays in the Rule 5 Draft. He started the next season on the Blue Jays' roster, but was rarely used, making only eight trips to the plate (and not reaching base in any of them). Defensively, he made two errors in his two games at third.

Unusually, he was pressed into service as an emergency catcher on May 26. Manager Bobby Mattick had pinch hit for his only two catchers on the roster, so Macha was sent out the catch the bottom of the ninth and help preserve a 3-1 Blue Jays lead over the Boston Red Sox at Fenway Park. In his only appearance at the position, Macha made no errors in his one-inning catching stint and the Jays held the Red Sox to one hit and no runs, winning the game.

This was Macha's final major league game, as the Detroit Tigers purchased his contract only two days later. He finished out the year with Detroit's Triple-A farm club, the Evansville Triplets, and retired from baseball after the end of the season.
