= Mike Barlow =

American baseball player (born 1948)

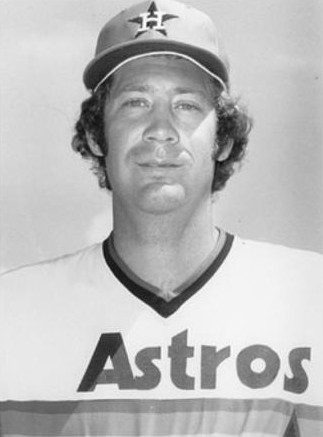
- Barlow in 1976
- Pitcher
- Born: April 30, 1948 (age 77); Stamford, New York, U.S.
- Batted: Left Threw: Right

MLB debut
- June 18, 1975, for the St. Louis Cardinals

Last MLB appearance
- June 8, 1981, for the Toronto Blue Jays

MLB statistics
- Win–loss record: 10–6
- Earned run average: 4.63
- Strikeouts: 96
- Stats at Baseball Reference

Teams
- St. Louis Cardinals (1975); Houston Astros (1976); California Angels (1977–1979); Toronto Blue Jays (1980–1981)

Michael Roswell Barlow (born April 30, 1948) is an American former professional baseball player who played seven seasons for the St. Louis Cardinals, Houston Astros, Los Angeles Angels, and Toronto Blue Jays of Major League Baseball.

== Early life ==
Barlow was born in the small town of Stamford in Upstate New York, where he lived on a large farm with two sisters.

== Career ==
After playing basketball at Milford High School in Oneonta, New York, Barlow played basketball at Syracuse University, before switching to baseball after his sophomore year. In 1969, he played collegiate summer baseball with the Harwich Mariners of the Cape Cod Baseball League. After Syracuse discontinued its baseball program after the 1972 season, Barlow signed with the Oakland Athletics organization.

== Personal life ==
Barlow briefly owned a restaurant in Syracuse, New York, and worked as the athletic director at Bishop Grimes Junior/Senior High School from 1998 - June 2011, in East Syracuse.

As of May 2018, Barlow lives in central New York with his wife after having four children together, all four of whom played a sport in college, including Chris Barlow, who was drafted from LeMoyne College by the Montreal Expos in the 9th round of the 2002 MLB June Amateur Draft, and then played for three summers in their organization.

Barlow also has five grandchildren.
