= Paul Hodgson (baseball) =

Canadian baseball player (born 1960)

- Outfielder
- Born: April 14, 1960 (age 64); Montreal, Quebec, Canada
- Batted: Right Threw: Right

MLB debut
- August 31, 1980, for the Toronto Blue Jays

Last MLB appearance
- October 5, 1980, for the Toronto Blue Jays

MLB statistics
- Batting average: .220
- Home runs: 1
- Runs batted in: 5
- Stats at Baseball Reference

Teams
- Toronto Blue Jays (1980)

Paul Joseph Dennis Hodgson (born April 14, 1960) is a Canadian former Major League Baseball outfielder. Born in Montreal, he grew up in Fredericton, New Brunswick.

After being signed on his 17th birthday by the Toronto Blue Jays as an amateur free agent in 1977, Hodgson played his entire career in their organization. He appeared in 20 games in the major leagues in 1980 at the age of 20; after three more seasons in the minors his, professional baseball career was over at the age of 23.

On June 3, 1995, Hodgson was inducted into the New Brunswick Sports Hall of Fame.

== Early life ==
Paul Hodgson was born in Montreal and was raised by adoptive parents Vonnie and Paul Hodgson Sr., the aunt and uncle of his birth mother, named Elaine, and he was initially raised to believe that Elaine was his cousin. Hodgson's birth father, Jerry Arceneaux, was black, and was raised by his birth mother's white family due to the stigmatization against interracial relationships at the time.
