= Clara Louise Bell =

American painter

- Born: 1886; Newton Falls, Ohio, United States
- Died: 1978 (aged 91–92)
- Education: Cleveland School of Art, Art Students League of New York
- Known for: Miniature painting
- Spouse: Bela Janowsky

Clara Louise Bell (1886 – 1978) (also known as Clara Louise Janowsky) was an American miniature painter.

== Early life and education ==
Bell was born in 1886 in Newton Falls, Ohio. She went to school at the Cleveland School of Art and at the Art Students League of New York. While at the Art Students League, she studied under Edith Stevenson Wright (1883–1975) and Henry Keller.

== Career ==
Bell painted miniature portraits. She was a member of the American Society of Miniature Painters. She was awarded the Penton Medal in 1919 by the Cleveland Museum of Art.

In 1943, she married sculptor Bela Janowsky. Bell painted portraits of Franklin D. Roosevelt and Herbert Hoover for the collection of American presidents at Butler Institute of American Art.

== Later life and legacy ==
Bell died in 1978.

== Notable collections ==
- Francine Serrano, 1924, watercolor on ivory, Smithsonian American Art Museum
- Laura Newell Veissi, 1925, watercolor on ivory, Metropolitan Museum of Art
