= Bobby Mattick =

American baseball player and manager (1915–2004)

- Shortstop / Manager
- Born: December 5, 1915; Sioux City, Iowa, U.S.
- Died: December 16, 2004 (aged 89); Scottsdale, Arizona, U.S.
- Batted: Right Threw: Right

MLB debut
- May 5, 1938, for the Chicago Cubs

Last MLB appearance
- August 18, 1942, for the Cincinnati Reds

MLB statistics
- Batting average: .233
- Home runs: 0
- Runs batted in: 64
- Managerial record: 104–164
- Winning %: .388
- Stats at Baseball Reference

Teams
- As player: Chicago Cubs (1938–1940); Cincinnati Reds (1941–1942); As manager: Toronto Blue Jays (1980–1981)

Member of the Canadian

Baseball Hall of Fame
- Induction: 1999

Robert James Mattick (December 5, 1915 – December 16, 2004) was an American professional baseball player, scout, and manager. He played in Major League Baseball (MLB) as a shortstop for the Chicago Cubs and Cincinnati Reds. After his playing career, he most notably worked in the Toronto Blue Jays organization, including two seasons as the team's manager.

== Playing career ==
Born in Sioux City, Iowa, Mattick was the son of outfielder Wally Mattick, who played for the Chicago White Sox in 1912 and 1913 and the St. Louis Cardinals in 1918. Bobby played only one season as a regular with the Chicago Cubs in 1940, although he played for the Cubs from 1938 to 1940 and the Cincinnati Reds in 1941 and 1942. Hampered in 1936 by a foul ball which cracked his skull above his right eye and caused double vision, he was a career .233 hitter with no home runs and 64 RBIs in 206 games.

== Post-playing career ==
Mattick began his managerial career in the Southern League in 1944 and 1945.

From 1946 to 1978, Mattick worked for nine different baseball organizations including as a scout for the Reds, Houston Astros, Milwaukee Brewers and Montreal Expos. He was credited by some baseball personnel as an incomparable longtime scout and player development specialist, signing such stars as Frank Robinson, Vada Pinson, Curt Flood, Rusty Staub, Don Baylor, and Gary Carter.

One of the Blue Jays' original employees in its inaugural season, Bobby joined the team in 1976 as the scouting supervisor, and helped draft the expansion Blue Jays.

In 1978 Mattick was appointed the director of player development. 1980 saw him take over the role of manager from Roy Hartsfield, the Blue Jays' original manager, becoming the oldest rookie manager to start a season at 64. Mattick turned down the job several times before finally accepting; he had initially wanted to manage the team only if he could wear his regular business clothing while in the dugout, rather than a uniform. This would have made him the first manager to not wear a uniform since Connie Mack retired in the early 1950s, but the Blue Jays insisted that Mattick wear a uniform.

The Blue Jays had their best season of their young existence in 1980, missing the 100-loss mark for the first time and finishing at 67–95. The following season was interrupted by the 1981 MLB strike, and the Blue Jays improved their winning percentage but still finished in last place in the American League East division in both halves of the season. Mattick was offered the opportunity to continue managing the Blue Jays for a third season, but elected to step down.

Following the 1981 season and a 104–164 career record during his two-year tenure as manager, Mattick continued to work in the organization as executive co-ordinator of baseball operations before his promotion to vice president of baseball in 1984.

Mattick played a key administrative role in scouting and development, leading to the Blue Jays' five AL East division championships, and World Series crowns in 1992 and 1993.

Mattick was inducted into the Canadian Baseball Hall of Fame in 1999, and the club renamed its spring training complex the Bobby Mattick Training Center at Englebert Complex in 2003. He was part of the Blue Jays' delegation at the 2004 Winter Meetings in Anaheim, California.

Mattick died 11 days after his 89th birthday after suffering a stroke at his Scottsdale, Arizona, home. Mattick's wife Jackie had died about two years previously. They had no children.

== Managerial record ==
Team	Year	Regular season					Postseason			
Team	Year	Games	Won	Lost	Win %	Finish	Won	Lost	Win %	Result
TOR	1980	162	67	95	.414	7th in AL East	–	–	–	–
TOR	1981	58	16	42	.276	7th in AL East	–	–	–	–
TOR	1981	48	21	27	.438	7th in AL East	–	–	–	–
Total		268	104	164	.388		0	0	–	

== See also ==
- List of second-generation Major League Baseball players
