= Wade Townsend =

American baseball player (born 1983)

- Pitcher
- Born: February 22, 1983 (age 42); Austin, Texas, U.S.
- Bats: Right Throws: Right

Wade Daniel Townsend (born February 22, 1983) is an American former professional baseball pitcher, twice selected as a first-round Major League Draft pick out of Rice University. Townsend attended Dripping Springs High School in Dripping Springs, Texas where he graduated in 2001. He played for coach Tom Hancock while at Dripping Springs. After his junior season of high school he was offered a scholarship to play baseball at Rice University. After college, Townsend was drafted by the Baltimore Orioles with the eighth pick of the 2004 Draft, but was ruled ineligible to continue negotiation with the Orioles while remaining at Rice to finish his degree. He was drafted by the Tampa Bay Devil Rays' with the eighth pick of 2005 Draft, signing for a $1.5 million bonus.

== College career ==
Townsend spent his first season as a reliever for Rice, which went to the College World Series and finished second in the nation in ERA. Townsend was 2–1 with a 2.28 ERA and six saves as a freshman, recording 51 strikeouts, 22 walks, and 10 wild pitches in 51.1 innings. As a sophomore in 2003, he struggled with his control in his first appearance but came into his own as a weekday starter, pitching Rice's non-conference games against rival Houston and Big 12 opponents. He finished the season 11–2 with a 2.20 ERA, beating defending national champion Texas twice, including once in the CWS, Houston three times, and single wins over Nebraska, Baylor, and Texas A&M. The consensus all-American also recorded five saves as a reliever, mostly in Western Athletic Conference games, and led the WAC with a school-record 164 strikeouts (broken by Eddie Degerman in 2006).

In 2003, he played collegiate summer baseball with the Wareham Gatemen of the Cape Cod Baseball League, and received the league's Outstanding Pro Prospect award. Rice's most consistent starter in 2004, Townsend finished 12–0 with a 1.80 ERA and two saves. Against San Jose State April 17, he came four outs away from a no-hitter.

Townsend, Philip Humber, and Jeff Niemann were all selected in the first eight picks of the 2004 draft – the first time three teammates had ever gone so early in the same draft. Townsend and the Orioles, however, did not agree to contract terms. He hired an agent, thereby renouncing his collegiate eligibility, and enrolled at Rice to complete his degree in his seventh semester. Major League Baseball, however, ruled that Townsend's return to school terminated the Orioles' right to negotiate a contract. He re-entered the draft in 2005 and was again taken eighth overall, this time by the Devil Rays.

== Professional career ==
Townsend's professional debut came at Class A Short-Season Hudson Valley. He finished the season 0–4 with a 5.49 ERA in 12 appearances, including 10 starts. He pitched in the Arizona Fall League in the 2005 off season. In fall of 2005 Townsend underwent Tommy John surgery on his elbow.

In fall 2008, Townsend was again sent to the Arizona Fall League, where he lasted only 10 2/3 innings and gave up 12 runs before he was sidelined with shoulder problems. Townsend underwent surgery to repair a torn labrum and ended up in rehab for most of the 2010 season. After an atrocious half-season in the independent leagues, Townsend retired in late 2010.

== Poker career ==
Townsend began playing poker professionally while at Rice University in the fall of 2004, after turning down a $2.2 million signing bonus from the Baltimore Orioles in order to finish his degree. In the offseason he has competed in World Series of Poker tournaments since 2011 while residing internationally to play in the offseason.
