= Jack Kucek =

American baseball player (born 1953)

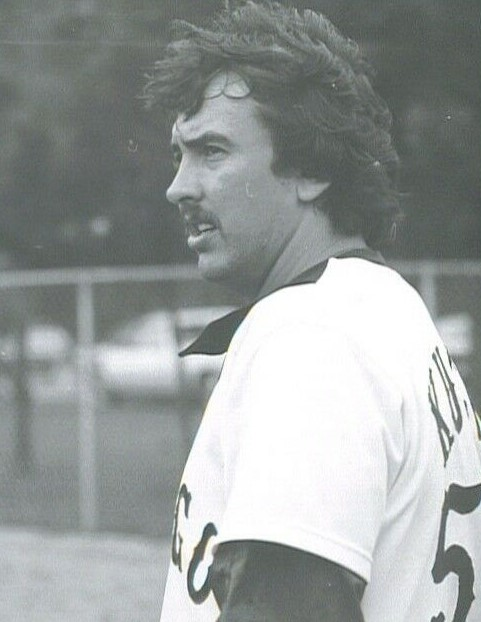
- Pitcher
- Born: June 8, 1953 (age 73); Warren, Ohio, U.S.
- Batted: Right Threw: Right

MLB debut
- August 8, 1974, for the Chicago White Sox

Last MLB appearance
- October 1, 1980, for the Toronto Blue Jays

MLB statistics
- Win–loss record: 7–16
- Earned run average: 5.12
- Strikeouts: 121
- Stats at Baseball Reference

Teams
- Chicago White Sox (1974–1979); Philadelphia Phillies (1979); Toronto Blue Jays (1980)

John Andrew Charles Kucek (born June 8, 1953), or JACK for short, is an American former Major League Baseball (MLB) pitcher who played for the Chicago White Sox, Philadelphia Phillies, and Toronto Blue Jays from 1974 to 1980.

== Amateur career ==
A native of Warren, Ohio, Kucek attended Newton Falls High School and Miami University. In 1973 he played collegiate summer baseball with the Cotuit Kettleers of the Cape Cod Baseball League. He graduated from Miami in 1974, and was selected by the White Sox in the second round of the 1974 Major League Baseball draft.

== Professional career ==
Kucek quickly worked his way up from the Class A Appleton Foxes to the Major Leagues, and made his White Sox debut on August 8, 1974 as a reliever against the California Angels.

Kucek played most of the next four seasons for minor league affiliates of the White Sox, but was occasionally called up to play for the Major League team. He was traded to the Phillies a few games into the 1979 season for Jim Morrison. Kucek played the majority of the 1979 season for the Phillies' Triple-A affiliate, the Oklahoma City 89ers, and was released in December of the same year.

Less than a month later, in January 1980, he was signed by the Toronto Blue Jays. Kucek split time between the Triple-A Syracuse Chiefs and the Blue Jays. In 1981, however, Kucek spent the entire year in the Blue Jays minor league system at Syracuse then retired after the season.

Of Kucek's 59 MLB appearances, 27 were starts. In 205 2/3 innings pitched, he allowed 232 hits and 111 bases on balls. He compiled 121 strikeouts and earned two saves in relief.
