= 1980 Major League Baseball season =

1980 MLB season
- League: American League (AL); National League (NL)
- Sport: Baseball
- Duration: Regular season: April 9 – October 5, 1980 (AL); April 9 – October 6, 1980 (NL); Postseason: October 7–21, 1980
- Games: 162
- Teams: 26 (14 AL, 12 NL)
- TV partner(s): ABC, NBC, USA

Draft
- Top draft pick: Darryl Strawberry
- Picked by: New York Mets

Regular season
- Season MVP: AL: George Brett (KC); NL: Mike Schmidt (PHI)

Postseason
- AL champions: Kansas City Royals
- AL runners-up: New York Yankees
- NL champions: Philadelphia Phillies
- NL runners-up: Houston Astros

World Series
- Champions: Philadelphia Phillies
- Runners-up: Kansas City Royals
- World Series MVP: Mike Schmidt (PHI)

MLB seasons
- ← 1979 1981 →

Locations of teams for the 1977–1981 American League seasons
West East
Locations of teams for the 1977–1992 National League seasons
West East

The 1980 major league baseball season began on April 9 while the regular season ended on October 6. The postseason began on October 7. The 77th World Series then began on October 14 and concluded on October 21 with the Philadelphia Phillies of the National League defeating the Kansas City Royals of the American League, four games to two, to win their first title in franchise history.

The 51st All-Star Game was held on July 8 at Dodger Stadium, home of the Los Angeles Dodgers. The National League won, 4–2, and was the ninth win in what would be an 11-game win streak that lasted until 1983.

A strike during April 1–8 caused the final eight days of spring training to be canceled, but did not impact the regular season schedule.

Umpire uniforms in both leagues were standardized, the American League's red blazer and blue pants and the National League's blue coats and pants were discarded and the uniforms became blue blazers, light blue short sleeved shirts, gray pants, and blue hats with "AL" or "NL" to show which league they were in. The American League umpires adopted numbers on their uniforms for the first time; National League umpires had numbers on the uniforms since 1970, though the numbers were now white on the blazers and blue on the short-sleeved shirts.

== Schedule ==
The 1980 schedule consisted of 162 games for all 14 teams in the American League and 12 teams in the National League. Both leagues saw different schedule formats, as they had since 1977. The American League was split into two seven-team divisions. Each team was scheduled to play 13 games against their six division rivals, totaling 78 games, and 12 games against seven opponents, totaling 84 interdivision games. This format, used since 1979 would be used until the league realigned into three division for the 1994 season. Meanwhile, the National League was split into two six-team divisions. Each team was scheduled to play 18 games against their five division rivals, totaling 90 games, and 12 games against six interdivision opponents, totaling 72 games. This continued the format put in place since the 1969, and like the American League, would continue to be the format in use until 1993.

Opening Day took place on April 9, featuring four teams. The final day of the scheduled regular season was on October 5, featuring all 26 teams. Due to the Houston Astros and Los Angeles Dodgers finishing with the same record of 92–70, a tiebreaker game was scheduled, to be considered an extension of the regular season, on October 6. The National League Championship Series took place between October 7 and October 12, while the American League Championship Series took place between October 8 and October 10. The World Series took place between October 14 and October 21.

== Rule changes ==
The 1980 season saw the following rule changes:

- The numbers on the backs of all must be at least six inches tall.
- Playing equipment shall not have undue commercialization of the product. Manufacturers must make sure that their products are in good taste, and any changes, prior to production, must be submitted to the Official Playing Rules Committee.
- A rule was put in effect and adopted in 1979 (though not in the rule book) regarding protesting games was put in the rule book. The rule states that even if a protested game was in violation of rules, replay of the game will only occur if the League President feels that the chance of winning for the protesting team was negatively affected due to the violation.
- Two rules that were adopted but not implemented for the 1979 season, are implemented:
  - Previously, any shortened game that was halted due to rain or other circumstances, which saw the visiting team tie or take the lead in the top half of the inning but not see the conclusion of said inning, would be scored as a shortened, completed game as of the end of the previous complete inning. Now, the game is to be considered suspended and completed at a future date.
  - The game-winning RBI was introduced, defined as the RBI that gives a team a lead in which it never relinquished (no matter how many future runs the opponent scored later).
- Any added games to determine a divisional tie will be included in the statistics for that championship season.
- For the purposes of calculating earned run average, all innings pitched (with the exception of 1/3 of an inning) will be rounded to the nearest whole number (this rounding rule would be reverted in 1982).
- Any team deciding to change the design or color of their uniform must give notice by May 1 of the prior season, or else face penalties from the leagues and/or the commissioner.

== Teams ==
League	Division	Team	City	Ballpark	Capacity	Manager
American League	East	Baltimore Orioles	Baltimore, Maryland	Baltimore Memorial Stadium	52,862	Earl Weaver
American League	East	Boston Red Sox	Boston, Massachusetts	Fenway Park	33,538	Don Zimmer
American League	East	Boston Red Sox	Boston, Massachusetts	Fenway Park	33,538	Johnny Pesky
American League	East	Cleveland Indians	Cleveland, Ohio	Cleveland Stadium	74,483	Dave Garcia
American League	East	Detroit Tigers	Detroit, Michigan	Tiger Stadium	52,806	Sparky Anderson
American League	East	Milwaukee Brewers	Milwaukee, Wisconsin	Milwaukee County Stadium	53,192	Buck Rodgers
American League	East	Milwaukee Brewers	Milwaukee, Wisconsin	Milwaukee County Stadium	53,192	George Bamberger
American League	East	Milwaukee Brewers	Milwaukee, Wisconsin	Milwaukee County Stadium	53,192	Buck Rodgers
American League	East	New York Yankees	New York, New York	Yankee Stadium	57,545	Dick Howser
American League	East	Toronto Blue Jays	Toronto, Ontario	Exhibition Stadium	43,737	Bobby Mattick
American League	West	California Angels	Anaheim, California	Anaheim Stadium	64,573	Jim Fregosi
American League	West	Chicago White Sox	Chicago, Illinois	Comiskey Park	44,492	Tony La Russa
American League	West	Kansas City Royals	Kansas City, Missouri	Royals Stadium	40,613	Jim Frey
American League	West	Minnesota Twins	Bloomington, Minnesota	Metropolitan Stadium	45,919	Gene Mauch
American League	West	Minnesota Twins	Bloomington, Minnesota	Metropolitan Stadium	45,919	Johnny Goryl
American League	West	Oakland Athletics	Oakland, California	Oakland–Alameda County Coliseum	50,000	Billy Martin
American League	West	Seattle Mariners	Seattle, Washington	Kingdome	59,059	Darrell Johnson
American League	West	Seattle Mariners	Seattle, Washington	Kingdome	59,059	Maury Wills
American League	West	Texas Rangers	Arlington, Texas	Arlington Stadium	41,284	Pat Corrales
National League	East	Chicago Cubs	Chicago, Illinois	Wrigley Field	37,702	Preston Gómez
National League	East	Chicago Cubs	Chicago, Illinois	Wrigley Field	37,702	Joey Amalfitano
National League	East	Montreal Expos	Montreal, Quebec	Olympic Stadium	59,149	Dick Williams
National League	East	New York Mets	New York, New York	Shea Stadium	55,300	Joe Torre
National League	East	Philadelphia Phillies	Philadelphia, Pennsylvania	Veterans Stadium	62,382	Dallas Green
National League	East	Pittsburgh Pirates	Pittsburgh, Pennsylvania	Three Rivers Stadium	58,722	Chuck Tanner
National League	East	St. Louis Cardinals	St. Louis, Missouri	Civic Center Busch Memorial Stadium	53,138	Ken Boyer
National League	East	St. Louis Cardinals	St. Louis, Missouri	Civic Center Busch Memorial Stadium	53,138	Jack Krol
National League	East	St. Louis Cardinals	St. Louis, Missouri	Civic Center Busch Memorial Stadium	53,138	Whitey Herzog
National League	East	St. Louis Cardinals	St. Louis, Missouri	Civic Center Busch Memorial Stadium	53,138	Red Schoendienst
National League	West	Atlanta Braves	Atlanta, Georgia	Atlanta–Fulton County Stadium	52,194	Bobby Cox
National League	West	Cincinnati Reds	Cincinnati, Ohio	Riverfront Stadium	52,953	John McNamara
National League	West	Houston Astros	Houston, Texas	Houston Astrodome	47,000	Bill Virdon
National League	West	Los Angeles Dodgers	Los Angeles, California	Dodger Stadium	56,000	Tommy Lasorda
National League	West	San Diego Padres	San Diego, California	San Diego Stadium	50,000	Jerry Coleman
National League	West	San Francisco Giants	San Francisco, California	Candlestick Park	58,495	Dave Bristol

== Standings ==
=== American League ===
AL East
Team	W	L	Pct.	GB	Home	Road
New York Yankees	103	59	.636	—	53‍–‍28	50‍–‍31
Baltimore Orioles	100	62	.617	3	50‍–‍31	50‍–‍31
Milwaukee Brewers	86	76	.531	17	40‍–‍42	46‍–‍34
Boston Red Sox	83	77	.519	19	36‍–‍45	47‍–‍32
Detroit Tigers	84	78	.519	19	43‍–‍38	41‍–‍40
Cleveland Indians	79	81	.494	23	44‍–‍35	35‍–‍46
Toronto Blue Jays	67	95	.414	36	35‍–‍46	32‍–‍49

AL West
Team	W	L	Pct.	GB	Home	Road
Kansas City Royals	97	65	.599	—	49‍–‍32	48‍–‍33
Oakland Athletics	83	79	.512	14	46‍–‍35	37‍–‍44
Minnesota Twins	77	84	.478	19½	44‍–‍36	33‍–‍48
Texas Rangers	76	85	.472	20½	39‍–‍41	37‍–‍44
Chicago White Sox	70	90	.438	26	37‍–‍42	33‍–‍48
California Angels	65	95	.406	31	30‍–‍51	35‍–‍44
Seattle Mariners	59	103	.364	38	36‍–‍45	23‍–‍58

=== National League ===
NL East
Team	W	L	Pct.	GB	Home	Road
Philadelphia Phillies	91	71	.562	—	49‍–‍32	42‍–‍39
Montreal Expos	90	72	.556	1	51‍–‍29	39‍–‍43
Pittsburgh Pirates	83	79	.512	8	47‍–‍34	36‍–‍45
St. Louis Cardinals	74	88	.457	17	41‍–‍40	33‍–‍48
New York Mets	67	95	.414	24	38‍–‍44	29‍–‍51
Chicago Cubs	64	98	.395	27	37‍–‍44	27‍–‍54

NL West
Team	W	L	Pct.	GB	Home	Road
Houston Astros	93	70	.571	—	55‍–‍26	38‍–‍44
Los Angeles Dodgers	92	71	.564	1	55‍–‍27	37‍–‍44
Cincinnati Reds	89	73	.549	3½	44‍–‍37	45‍–‍36
Atlanta Braves	81	80	.503	11	50‍–‍30	31‍–‍50
San Francisco Giants	75	86	.466	17	44‍–‍37	31‍–‍49
San Diego Padres	73	89	.451	19½	45‍–‍36	28‍–‍53

- The Houston Astros defeated the Los Angeles Dodgers in a one-game playoff to earn the NL West division title.

=== Tie games ===
4 tie games (3 in AL, 1 in NL), which are not factored into winning percentage or games behind (and were often replayed again) occurred throughout the season.

==== American League ====
The Chicago White Sox and Texas Rangers had two ties each. The Detroit Tigers and Seattle Mariners had one tie each.

- June 2, Texas Rangers vs. Chicago White Sox, tied at 1 following a shortened six innings on account of a 30-minute rain delay. The rain delay was called after one out in the bottom of the sixth.
- June 2, Seattle Mariners vs. Detroit Tigers, tied at 3 following the 13th inning on account of rain.
- July 26 (game 2), Texas Rangers vs. Chicago White Sox, tied at 1 following a shortened six innings on account of a two hour rain delay. The rain delay was called after two batters in the bottom of the sixth.

==== National League ====
The Cincinnati Reds and San Diego Padres had one tie each.

- June 9, San Diego Padres vs. Cincinnati Reds, tied at 6 through the top of the 11th. Prior to the bottom of the 11th, a one hour, 21 minute rain delay occurred, before being called a tie on account of rain.

== Postseason ==
The postseason began on October 7 and ended on October 21 with the Philadelphia Phillies defeating the Kansas City Royals in the 1980 World Series in six games.

=== Bracket ===
League Championship Series (ALCS, NLCS)
East	NY Yankees	0
West	Kansas City	3
East	Philadelphia	3
West	Houston	2

World Series
AL	Kansas City	2
NL	Philadelphia	4

== Managerial changes ==
=== Off-season ===
Team	Former Manager	New Manager
Chicago Cubs	Joey Amalfitano	Preston Gómez
Kansas City Royals	Whitey Herzog	Jim Frey
Milwaukee Brewers	George Bamberger	Buck Rodgers
New York Yankees	Bob Lemon	Dick Howser
Oakland Athletics	Jim Marshall	Billy Martin
San Diego Padres	Roger Craig	Jerry Coleman
Toronto Blue Jays	Roy Hartsfield	Bobby Mattick

=== In-season ===
Team	Former Manager	New Manager
Boston Red Sox	Don Zimmer	Johnny Pesky
Chicago Cubs	Preston Gómez	Joey Amalfitano
Milwaukee Brewers	Buck Rodgers	George Bamberger
Milwaukee Brewers	George Bamberger	Buck Rodgers
Minnesota Twins	Gene Mauch	Johnny Goryl
Seattle Mariners	Darrell Johnson	Maury Wills
Seattle Mariners	Ken Boyer	Jack Krol
Seattle Mariners	Jack Krol	Whitey Herzog
Seattle Mariners	Whitey Herzog	Red Schoendienst

== League leaders ==
=== American League ===
Hitting leaders
Stat	Player	Total
AVG	George Brett (KC)	.390
OPS	George Brett (KC)	1.118
HR	Reggie Jackson (NYY); Ben Oglivie (MIL)	41
RBI	Cecil Cooper (MIL)	122
R	Willie Wilson (KC)	133
H	Willie Wilson (KC)	230
SB	Rickey Henderson (OAK)	100

Pitching leaders
Stat	Player	Total
W	Steve Stone (BAL)	25
L	Brian Kingman (OAK)	20
ERA	Rudy May (NYY)	2.46
K	Len Barker (CLE)	187
IP	Rick Langford (OAK)	290.0
SV	Rich Gossage (NYY); Dan Quisenberry (KC)	33
WHIP	Rudy May (NYY)	1.044

=== National League ===
Hitting leaders
Stat	Player	Total
AVG	Bill Buckner (CHC)	.324
OPS	Mike Schmidt (PHI)	1.004
HR	Mike Schmidt (PHI)	48
RBI	Mike Schmidt (PHI)	121
R	Keith Hernandez (STL)	111
H	Steve Garvey (LAD)	200
SB	Ron LeFlore (MON)	97

Pitching leaders
Stat	Player	Total
W	Steve Carlton (PHI)	24
L	Phil Niekro (ATL)	18
ERA	Don Sutton (LAD)	2.20
K	Steve Carlton (PHI)	286
IP	Steve Carlton (PHI)	304.0
SV	Bruce Sutter (CHC)	28
WHIP	Don Sutton (LAD)	0.989

== Milestones ==
=== Batters ===
==== Cycles ====
- Iván DeJesús (CHC):
  - DeJesús hit for his first cycle and ninth in franchise history on April 22 against the St. Louis Cardinals.
- Fred Lynn (BOS):
  - Lynn hit for his first cycle and 16th in franchise history on May 13 against the Minnesota Twins.
- Mike Easler (PIT):
  - Easler hit for his first cycle and 20th in franchise history on June 12 against the Cincinnati Reds.
- Gary Ward (MIN):
  - Ward hit for his first cycle and 10th in franchise history on Milwaukee Brewers.
- Charlie Moore (MIL):
  - Moore hit for his first cycle and second in franchise history on California Angels.

==== Other batting accomplishments ====
- Sixto Lezcano (MIL):
  - Became the first player to hit two grand slams on Opening Day when he walks off the Boston Red Sox on April 10; he had previously done so in 1978.
- Johnny Bench (CIN):
  - Breaks the record for home runs by a catcher by hitting his 306th home run, previously set by Yogi Berra, in the second inning in a game against the San Diego Padres on May 29.
- Ken Landreaux (MIN):
  - Ties an American League record in hitting three triples during a win over the Texas Rangers on July 3.
- Reggie Jackson (NYY):
  - Became the 19th player in Major League history to hit 400 home runs in the fourth inning against the Chicago White Sox on August 11.

=== Pitching ===
==== No-hitters ====
- Jerry Reuss (LAD):
  - Reuss threw his first no-hitter and 19th no-hitter in franchise history, by defeating the San Francisco Giants 8–0 on June 27. He walked none and struck out two, throwing 73 strikes on 107 pitches. He missed a perfect game due to a throwing error in the first inning allowing a runner to reach first base.

==== Other pitching accomplishments ====
- Nolan Ryan (HOU):
  - Recorded his 3,000th career strikeout on July 4 by striking out César Gerónimo of the Cincinnati Reds in the second inning. Ryan became the fourth player to reach this mark in Major League history.
- Steve Carlton (PHI):
  - Set a Major League record by throwing the most strikeouts as a left-handed pitcher, striking out seven against the St. Louis Cardinals in an 8–3 win to bring his career total to 2,836. Mickey Lolich had held the record previously with 2,832 strikeouts.
- Bill Gullickson (MON):
  - Sets a record for most strikeouts in a single game by a rookie pitcher when he strikes out 18 batters against the Chicago Cubs on September 10, winning 4–2.

== Awards and honors ==
Baseball Writers' Association of America Awards
BBWAA Award	National League	American League
Rookie of the Year	Steve Howe (LAD)	Joe Charbonneau (CLE)
Cy Young Award	Steve Carlton (PHI)	Steve Stone (BAL)
Most Valuable Player	Mike Schmidt (PHI)	George Brett (KC)
Babe Ruth Award (World Series MVP)	Tug McGraw (PHI)	—
Gold Glove Awards
Position	National League	American League
Pitcher	Phil Niekro (ATL)	Mike Norris (OAK)
Catcher	Gary Carter (MON)	Jim Sundberg (TEX)
First Baseman	Keith Hernandez (STL)	Cecil Cooper (MIL)
Second Baseman	Doug Flynn (NYM)	Frank White (KC)
Third Baseman	Mike Schmidt (PHI)	Buddy Bell (TEX)
Shortstop	Ozzie Smith (STL)	Alan Trammell (DET)
Outfielders	Andre Dawson (MON)	Fred Lynn (BOS)
Outfielders	Garry Maddox (PHI)	Dwayne Murphy (OAK)
Outfielders	Dave Winfield (SD)	Willie Wilson (KC)
Silver Slugger Awards
Pitcher/Designated Hitter	Bob Forsch (STL)	Reggie Jackson (NYY)
Catcher	Ted Simmons (STL)	Lance Parrish (DET)
First Baseman	Keith Hernandez (STL)	Cecil Cooper (MIL)
Second Baseman	Manny Trillo (PHI)	Willie Randolph (NYY)
Third Baseman	Mike Schmidt (PHI)	George Brett (KC)
Shortstop	Garry Templeton (STL)	Robin Yount (MIL)
Outfielders	Dusty Baker (LAD)	Ben Oglivie (MIL)
Outfielders	Andre Dawson (MON)	Al Oliver (TEX)
Outfielders	George Hendrick (STL)	Willie Wilson (KC)

=== Other awards ===
- Outstanding Designated Hitter Award: Hal McRae (KC)
- Roberto Clemente Award (Humanitarian): Phil Niekro (ATL)
- Hutch Award: George Brett (KC)
- League Championship Series Most Valuable Player Award: Manny Trillo (PHI, National); Frank White (KC, American)
- Rolaids Relief Man Award: Rollie Fingers (SD, National); Dan Quisenberry (KC, American)
- Sport Magazine's World Series Most Valuable Player Award: Mike Schmidt (PHI)

The Sporting News Awards
Award	National League	American League
Player of the Year	—	George Brett (KC)
Pitcher of the Year	Steve Carlton (PHI)	Steve Stone (BAL)
Fireman of the Year (Relief pitcher)	Rollie Fingers (SD) Tom Hume (CIN)	Dan Quisenberry (KC)
Rookie Player of the Year	Lonnie Smith (PHI)	Joe Charboneau (CLE)
Rookie Pitcher of the Year	Bill Gullickson (MON)	Britt Burns (CWS)
Comeback Player of the Year	Jerry Reuss (LAD)	Matt Keough (OAK)
Manager of the Year	Bill Virdon (HOU)	—
Executive of the Year	Tal Smith (HOU)	—

=== Monthly awards ===
==== Player of the Month ====
Month	National League	American League
April	Dave Kingman (CHC)	Lamar Johnson (CWS)
May	Mike Schmidt (PHI)	Ben Oglivie (MIL)
June	Dusty Baker (LAD)	Rod Carew (CAL)
July	Bob Horner (ATL)	George Brett (KC); Reggie Jackson (NYY)
August	Dale Murphy (ATL)	Cecil Cooper (MIL)
September	Gary Carter (MON)	Eddie Murray (BAL); Jim Rice (BOS)

==== Pitcher of the Month ====
Month	National League	American League
April	J. R. Richard (HOU)	Dave Stieb (TOR)
May	Steve Carlton (PHI)	Chuck Rainey (BOS)
June	Jerry Reuss (LAD)	Steve Stone (BAL)
July	Pat Zachry (NYM)	Larry Gura (KC)
August	Rick Reuschel (CHC)	Bob Stanley (BOS)
September	Marty Bystrom (PHI)	Tim Stoddard (BAL)

=== Baseball Hall of Fame ===
- Al Kaline
- Chuck Klein
- Duke Snider
- Tom Yawkey (executive)

== Home field attendance ==
Team name	Wins	%±	Home attendance	%±	Per game
Los Angeles Dodgers	92	16.5%	3,249,287	13.6%	39,625
Philadelphia Phillies	91	8.3%	2,651,650	−4.4%	32,736
New York Yankees	103	15.7%	2,627,417	3.5%	32,437
California Angels	65	−26.1%	2,297,327	−9.0%	28,362
Kansas City Royals	97	14.1%	2,288,714	1.2%	28,256
Houston Astros	93	4.5%	2,278,217	19.9%	28,126
Montreal Expos	90	−5.3%	2,208,175	5.0%	27,602
Cincinnati Reds	89	−1.1%	2,022,450	−14.2%	24,664
Boston Red Sox	83	−8.8%	1,956,092	−16.9%	24,149
Milwaukee Brewers	86	−9.5%	1,857,408	−3.2%	22,651
Baltimore Orioles	100	−2.0%	1,797,438	6.9%	22,191
Detroit Tigers	84	−1.2%	1,785,293	9.5%	21,772
Pittsburgh Pirates	83	−15.3%	1,646,757	14.7%	20,330
Toronto Blue Jays	67	26.4%	1,400,327	−2.2%	17,288
St. Louis Cardinals	74	−14.0%	1,385,147	−14.9%	17,101
Chicago Cubs	64	−20.0%	1,206,776	−26.8%	14,898
Chicago White Sox	70	−4.1%	1,200,365	−6.3%	14,819
Texas Rangers	76	−8.4%	1,198,175	−21.2%	14,977
New York Mets	67	6.3%	1,192,073	51.1%	14,537
San Diego Padres	73	7.4%	1,139,026	−21.8%	14,062
San Francisco Giants	75	5.6%	1,096,115	−24.7%	13,532
Atlanta Braves	81	22.7%	1,048,411	36.3%	13,105
Cleveland Indians	79	−2.5%	1,033,827	2.2%	13,086
Oakland Athletics	83	53.7%	842,259	174.6%	10,398
Seattle Mariners	59	−11.9%	836,204	−1.0%	10,324
Minnesota Twins	77	−6.1%	769,206	−28.1%	9,615

== Media ==
=== Television ===
Thursday Night Baseball aired on USA Network. ABC aired Monday Night Baseball, the All-Star Game, and both League Championship Series. NBC televised the weekend Game of the Week and the World Series.

== Retired numbers ==
- Duke Snider had his No. 4 retired by the Los Angeles Dodgers on July 6. This was the sixth number retired by the team.
- Al Kaline had his No. 6 retired by the Detroit Tigers on August 17. This was the first number retired by the team.
- Willie McCovey had his No. 44 retired by the San Francisco Giants on September 21. This was the fourth number retired by the team.

== See also ==
- 1980 in baseball (Events, Births, Deaths)
- 1980 Nippon Professional Baseball season
