= 1975 Milwaukee Brewers season =

1975 Milwaukee Brewers
- League: American League
- Division: East
- Ballpark: Milwaukee County Stadium
- City: Milwaukee, Wisconsin, United States
- Record: 68–94 (.420)
- Divisional place: 5th
- Owners: Bud Selig
- General managers: Jim Baumer
- Managers: Del Crandall, Harvey Kuenn
- Television: WTMJ-TV (Gary Bender, Jim Irwin)
- Radio: 620 WTMJ (Merle Harmon, Bob Uecker)
- Stats: ESPN.com; Baseball Reference

The 1975 Milwaukee Brewers season was the 6th season for the Brewers in Milwaukee, and their 7th overall. The Brewers finished fifth in the American League East with a record of 68 wins and 94 losses.

== Offseason ==
- November 2, 1974: Dave May and a player to be named later were traded by the Brewers to the Atlanta Braves for Hank Aaron. The Milwaukee Brewers completed the trade by sending Roger Alexander (minors) to the Braves on December 2.
- January 9, 1975: Lenn Sakata was drafted by the Milwaukee Brewers in the 1st round (10th pick) of the 1975 amateur draft (January Secondary).

== Regular season ==
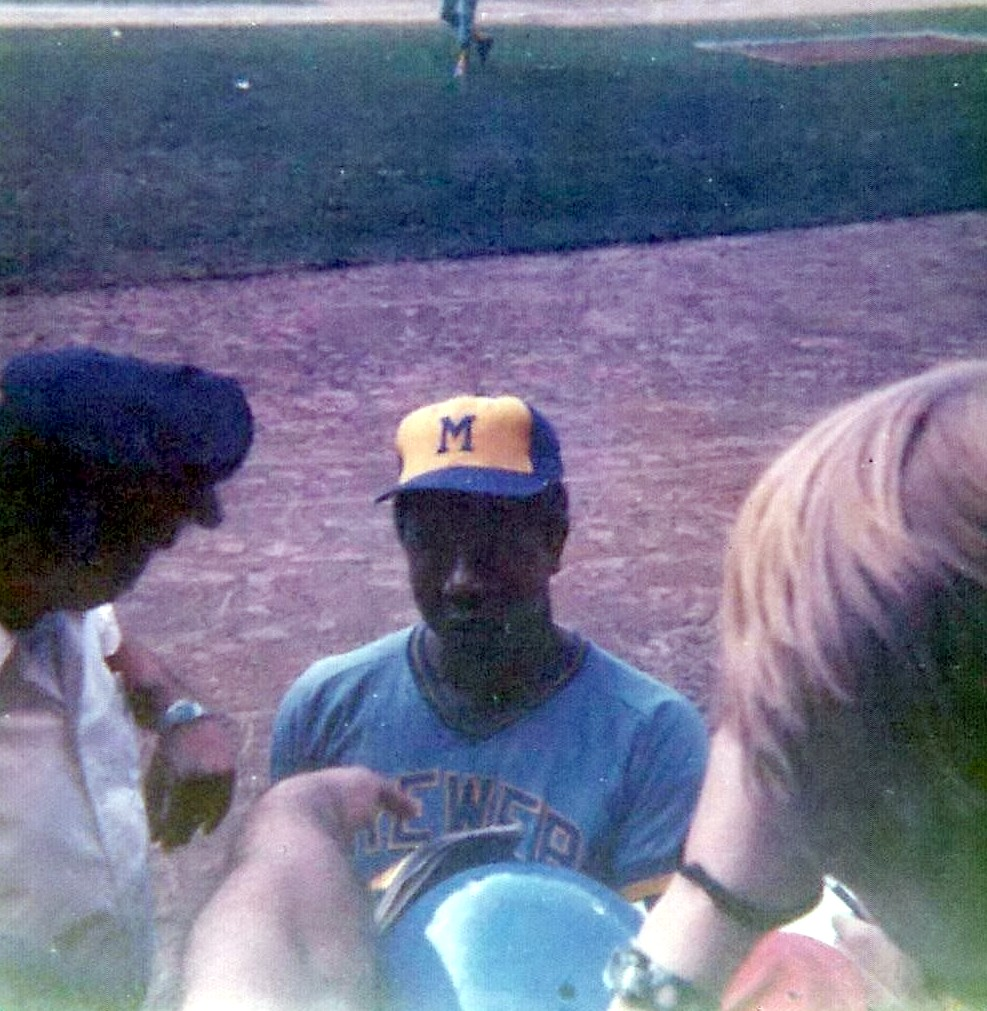
Aaron with the Brewers in 1975

- On May 1, 1975, Hank Aaron broke baseball's all-time RBI record, previously held by Babe Ruth with 2,213.

=== Season standings ===
AL East
Team	W	L	Pct.	GB	Home	Road
Boston Red Sox	95	65	.594	—	47‍–‍34	48‍–‍31
Baltimore Orioles	90	69	.566	4½	44‍–‍33	46‍–‍36
New York Yankees	83	77	.519	12	43‍–‍35	40‍–‍42
Cleveland Indians	79	80	.497	15½	41‍–‍39	38‍–‍41
Milwaukee Brewers	68	94	.420	28	36‍–‍45	32‍–‍49
Detroit Tigers	57	102	.358	37½	31‍–‍49	26‍–‍53

=== Record vs. opponents ===
1975 American League record Sources:
Team	BAL	BOS	CAL	CWS	CLE	DET	KC	MIL	MIN	NYY	OAK	TEX
Baltimore	—	9–9	6–6	7–4	10–8	12–4	7–5	14–4	6–6	8–10	4–8	7–5
Boston	9–9	—	6–6	8–4	7–11	13–5	7–5	10–8	10–2	11–5	6–6	8–4
California	6–6	6–6	—	9–9	3–9	6–5	4–14	7–5	8–10	7–5	7–11	9–9
Chicago	4–7	4–8	9–9	—	7–5	5–7	9–9	8–4	9–9	6–6	9–9	5–13
Cleveland	8–10	11–7	9–3	5–7	—	12–6	6–6	9–9	3–6	9–9	2–10	5–7
Detroit	4–12	5–13	5–6	7–5	6–12	—	6–6	7–11	4–8	6–12	6–6	1–11
Kansas City	5–7	5–7	14–4	9–9	6–6	6–6	—	7–5	11–7	7–5	11–7	14–4
Milwaukee	4–14	8–10	5–7	4–8	9–9	11–7	5–7	—	2–10	9–9	5–7	6–6
Minnesota	6–6	2–10	10–8	9–9	6–3	8–4	7–11	10–2	—	4–8	6–12	8–10
New York	10–8	5–11	5–7	6–6	9–9	12–6	5–7	9–9	8–4	—	6–6	8–4
Oakland	8–4	6–6	11–7	9–9	10–2	6–6	11–7	7–5	12–6	6–6	—	12–6
Texas	5–7	4–8	9–9	13–5	7–5	11–1	4–14	6–6	10–8	4–8	6–12	—

=== Notable transactions ===
- April 3, 1975: Jesús Vega was signed as an amateur free agent by the Brewers.
- May 8, 1975: Bob Coluccio was traded by the Brewers to the Chicago White Sox for Bill Sharp.
- June 14, 1975: Johnny Briggs was traded by the Brewers to the Minnesota Twins for Bobby Darwin.

=== Roster ===
1975 Milwaukee Brewers
Roster
Pitchers: 45 Larry Anderson; 46 Jerry Augustine; 43 Rick Austin; 40 Pete Broberg; 35 Bill Castro; 38 Bill Champion; 48 Jim Colborn; 20 Lafayette Currence; 18 Tom Hausman; 42 Tom Murphy; 49 Pat Osburn; 23 Eduardo Rodríguez; 41 Jim Slaton; 29 Ed Sprague; 25 Bill Travers	Catchers: 22 Charlie Moore; 15 Darrell Porter; Infielders: 2,11 Kurt Bevacqua; 33 Tommy Bianco; 9 Pedro García; 4 Tim Johnson; 8 Jack Lind; 7 Don Money; 5 George Scott; 2 Bob Sheldon; 19 Robin Yount	Outfielders: 44 Hank Aaron; 12 Johnny Briggs; 26 Bob Coluccio; 12 Bobby Darwin; 8 Rob Ellis; 6 Mike Hegan; 37 Sixto Lezcano; 17 Bobby Mitchell; 26 Bill Sharp; 3 Gorman Thomas	Manager: 1 Del Crandall (4/8-9/27); 32 Harvey Kuenn (9/28-9/28); Coaches: 32 Harvey Kuenn (Hitting); 37 Ken McBride (Pitching); 24 Joe Nossek (Third Base); 30 Jim Walton (First Base)

== Game log ==
=== Regular season ===
Legend
	Brewers win
	Brewers loss
	Postponement
	Eliminated from playoff race
**Bold**	Brewers team member

1975 regular season game log: 68–94 (Home: 36–45; Away: 32–49)
April: 9–7 (Home: 4–2; Away: 5–5)

#	Date	Time (CT)	Opponent	Score	Loss	Win	Save	Time of Game	Attendance	Record	Box/ Streak

May: 12–14 (Home: 6–8; Away: 6–6)

#	Date	Time (CT)	Opponent	Score	Loss	Win	Save	Time of Game	Attendance	Record	Box/ Streak

June: 19–13 (Home: 11–6; Away: 8–7)

#	Date	Time (CT)	Opponent	Score	Loss	Win	Save	Time of Game	Attendance	Record	Box/ Streak

July: 12–19 (Home: 7–10; Away: 5–9)

#	Date	Time (CT)	Opponent	Score	Loss	Win	Save	Time of Game	Attendance	Record	Box/ Streak
ASG	July 15	7:30 p.m. CDT	NL @ AL	6–3	Matlack (1–0)	Hunter (0–1)	—	3:35	51,480	—	ASG

August: 7–23 (Home: 2–12; Away: 5–11)

#	Date	Time (CT)	Opponent	Score	Loss	Win	Save	Time of Game	Attendance	Record	Box/ Streak

September: 9–18 (Home: 6–7; Away: 3–11)

#	Date	Time (CT)	Opponent	Score	Loss	Win	Save	Time of Game	Attendance	Record	Box/ Streak

== Player stats ==
= Indicates team leader

= Indicates league leader

=== Batting ===
==== Starters by position ====
Note: Pos = Position; G = Games played; AB = At bats; H = Hits; Avg. = Batting average; HR = Home runs; RBI = Runs batted in

Pos	Player	G	AB	H	Avg.	HR	RBI
C	Darrell Porter	130	409	95	.232	18	60
1B	George Scott	158	617	176	.285	36	109
2B	Pedro García	98	302	68	.225	6	38
3B	Don Money	109	405	112	.277	15	43
SS	Robin Yount	147	558	149	.267	8	52
LF	Bobby Mitchell	93	229	57	.249	9	41
CF	Bill Sharp	125	373	95	.255	1	34
RF	Sixto Lezcano	134	429	106	.247	11	43
DH	Hank Aaron	137	465	109	.234	12	60

==== Other batters ====
Note: G = Games played; AB = At bats; H = Hits; Avg. = Batting average; HR = Home runs; RBI = Runs batted in

Player	G	AB	H	Avg.	HR	RBI
Kurt Bevacqua	104	258	59	.229	2	24
Charlie Moore	73	241	70	.290	1	29
Gorman Thomas	121	240	43	.179	10	28
Mike Hegan	93	203	51	.251	5	22
Bobby Darwin	55	186	46	.247	8	23
Bob Sheldon	53	181	52	.287	0	14
Tim Johnson	38	85	12	.141	0	2
Johnny Briggs	28	74	22	.297	3	5
Bob Coluccio	22	62	12	.194	1	5
Tommy Bianco	18	34	6	.176	0	0
Jack Lind	17	20	1	.050	0	0
Rob Ellis	6	7	2	.286	0	0

=== Pitching ===
==== Starting pitchers ====
Note: G = Games pitched; IP = Innings pitched; W = Wins; L = Losses; ERA = Earned run average; SO = Strikeouts

Player	G	IP	W	L	ERA	SO
Pete Broberg	38	220.1	14	16	4.13	100
Jim Slaton	37	217.0	11	18	4.52	119
Jim Colborn	36	206.1	11	13	4.27	79
Bill Travers	28	136.1	6	11	4.29	57

==== Other pitchers ====
Note: G = Games pitched; IP = Innings pitched; W = Wins; L = Losses; ERA = Earned run average; SO = Strikeouts

Player	G	IP	W	L	ERA	SO
Tom Hausman	29	112.0	3	6	4.10	46
Bill Champion	27	110.0	6	6	5.89	40
Bill Castro	18	75.0	3	2	2.52	25
Ed Sprague	18	67.1	1	7	4.68	21
Larry Anderson	8	30.1	1	0	5.04	13
Jerry Augustine	5	26.2	2	0	3.04	8
Lafayette Currence	8	18.2	0	2	7.71	7
Pat Osburn	6	11.2	0	1	5.40	1

==== Relief pitchers ====
Note: G = Games pitched; W = Wins; L = Losses; SV = Saves; ERA = Earned run average; SO = Strikeouts

Player	G	W	L	SV	ERA	SO
Tom Murphy	52	1	9	20	4.60	32
Eduardo Rodríguez	43	7	0	7	3.49	65
Rick Austin	32	2	3	2	3.05	30

== Awards and honors ==
All-Star Game

- George Scott, 1B, Reserve
- Hank Aaron, OF, Reserve

Aaron appeared in his last and 24th All-Star Game (25th All-Star Game selection); lining out to Dave Concepción as a pinch-hitter in the second inning. This All-Star Game, like the first one he played in 1955, was before a home crowd at Milwaukee County Stadium.

== Farm system ==
The Brewers' farm system consisted of four minor league affiliates in 1975. The Newark Co-Pilots won the New York–Penn League championship.

Level	Team	League	Manager
Triple-A	Sacramento Solons	Pacific Coast League	Harry Bright
Double-A	Thetford Mines Miners	Eastern League	John Felske
Class A	Burlington Bees	Midwest League	Matt Galante
Class A Short Season	Newark Co-Pilots	New York–Penn League	Tony Roig
