= 1975 New York Yankees season =

Season for the Major League Baseball team the New York Yankees

1975 New York Yankees
- League: American League
- Division: East
- Ballpark: Shea Stadium
- City: New York City
- Record: 83-77 (.519)
- Owners: George Steinbrenner
- General managers: Gabe Paul
- Managers: Bill Virdon (games 1-104); Billy Martin (games 104-160)
- Television: WPIX (Phil Rizzuto, Frank Messer, Bill White)
- Radio: WMCA (Frank Messer, Phil Rizzuto, Bill White, Dom Valentino)

The 1975 New York Yankees season was the 73rd season for the Yankees. The team finished with a record of 83–77, finishing 12 games behind the Boston Red Sox. The Yankees played at Shea Stadium due to the ongoing renovation of Yankee Stadium, which re-opened in 1976.

Bill Virdon opened the season as Yankees manager, but he was replaced on August 1 by Billy Martin. This would be the first of five stints as Yankees manager for Martin.

== Offseason ==
- October 22, 1974: Bobby Murcer was traded by the Yankees to the San Francisco Giants for Bobby Bonds.
- December 3, 1974: Joe Pactwa was purchased from the Yankees by the Alijadores de Tampico.
- December 20, 1974: Sam McDowell was released by the Yankees.
- December 31, 1974: Catfish Hunter was signed as a free agent by the Yankees.
- January 21, 1975: Gene Michael was released by the Yankees.

== Regular season ==
=== Season standings ===
AL East
Team	W	L	Pct.	GB	Home	Road
Boston Red Sox	95	65	.594	—	47‍–‍34	48‍–‍31
Baltimore Orioles	90	69	.566	4½	44‍–‍33	46‍–‍36
New York Yankees	83	77	.519	12	43‍–‍35	40‍–‍42
Cleveland Indians	79	80	.497	15½	41‍–‍39	38‍–‍41
Milwaukee Brewers	68	94	.420	28	36‍–‍45	32‍–‍49
Detroit Tigers	57	102	.358	37½	31‍–‍49	26‍–‍53

=== Record vs. opponents ===
1975 American League record Sources:
Team	BAL	BOS	CAL	CWS	CLE	DET	KC	MIL	MIN	NYY	OAK	TEX
Baltimore	—	9–9	6–6	7–4	10–8	12–4	7–5	14–4	6–6	8–10	4–8	7–5
Boston	9–9	—	6–6	8–4	7–11	13–5	7–5	10–8	10–2	11–5	6–6	8–4
California	6–6	6–6	—	9–9	3–9	6–5	4–14	7–5	8–10	7–5	7–11	9–9
Chicago	4–7	4–8	9–9	—	7–5	5–7	9–9	8–4	9–9	6–6	9–9	5–13
Cleveland	8–10	11–7	9–3	5–7	—	12–6	6–6	9–9	3–6	9–9	2–10	5–7
Detroit	4–12	5–13	5–6	7–5	6–12	—	6–6	7–11	4–8	6–12	6–6	1–11
Kansas City	5–7	5–7	14–4	9–9	6–6	6–6	—	7–5	11–7	7–5	11–7	14–4
Milwaukee	4–14	8–10	5–7	4–8	9–9	11–7	5–7	—	2–10	9–9	5–7	6–6
Minnesota	6–6	2–10	10–8	9–9	6–3	8–4	7–11	10–2	—	4–8	6–12	8–10
New York	10–8	5–11	5–7	6–6	9–9	12–6	5–7	9–9	8–4	—	6–6	8–4
Oakland	8–4	6–6	11–7	9–9	10–2	6–6	11–7	7–5	12–6	6–6	—	12–6
Texas	5–7	4–8	9–9	13–5	7–5	11–1	4–14	6–6	10–8	4–8	6–12	—

=== Notable transactions ===
- June 3, 1975: 1975 Major League Baseball draft
  - Jim Beattie was drafted by the New York Yankees in the 4th round.
  - Willie Upshaw was drafted by the Yankees in the 5th round.
- June 13, 1975: Ed Brinkman was purchased by the Yankees from the Texas Rangers.

=== Roster ===
1975 New York Yankees
Roster
Pitchers: 36 Pat Dobson; 49 Ron Guidry; 39 Larry Gura; 29 Catfish Hunter; 28 Sparky Lyle; 40 Tippy Martinez; 43 Rudy May; 33 Doc Medich; 53 Dave Pagan; 41 Rick Sawyer; 19 Dick Tidrow; 41 Mike Wallace	Catchers: 46 Rick Dempsey; 45 Ed Herrmann; 15 Thurman Munson; Infielders: 2 Sandy Alomar Sr.; 20 Ed Brinkman; 10 Chris Chambliss; 20 Eddie Leon; 22 Jim Mason; 9 Graig Nettles; 42 Bob Oliver; 11 Fred Stanley; 52 Otto Vélez	Outfielders: 18 Dave Bergman; 24 Rick Bladt; 12 Ron Blomberg; 25 Bobby Bonds; 26 Rich Coggins; 49 Kerry Dineen; 23 Alex Johnson; 27 Elliott Maddox; 18 Larry Murray; 14 Lou Piniella; 6 Roy White; 44 Terry Whitfield; 13 Walt Williams	Manager: 1 Billy Martin; 21 Bill Virdon; Coaches: 62 Cloyd Boyer; 16 Whitey Ford; 32 Elston Howard; 34 Dick Howser; 31 Mel Wright

== Player stats ==
= Indicates team leader

=== Batting ===
==== Starters by position ====
Note: Pos = Position; G = Games played; AB = At bats; H = Hits; Avg. = Batting average; HR = Home runs; RBI = Runs batted in

Pos	Player	G	AB	R	H	Avg.	HR	RBI	SB
C	Thurman Munson	157	597	83	190	.318	12	102	3
1B	Chris Chambliss	150	562	66	171	.304	9	72	0
2B	Sandy Alomar Sr.	151	489	61	117	.239	2	39	28
3B	Graig Nettles	157	581	71	155	.267	21	91	1
SS	Jim Mason	94	223	17	34	.152	2	16	0
LF	Roy White	148	566	81	161	.290	12	59	16
CF	Elliott Maddox	55	218	36	67	.307	1	23	9
RF	Bobby Bonds	145	529	93	143	.270	32	85	30
DH	Ed Herrmann	80	200	16	51	.255	6	30	0

==== Other batters ====
Note: G = Games played; AB = At bats; H = Hits; Avg. = Batting average; HR = Home runs; RBI = Runs batted in

Player	G	AB	H	Avg.	HR	RBI
Fred Stanley	117	252	56	.222	0	15
Lou Piniella	74	199	39	.196	0	22
Walt Williams	82	185	52	.281	5	16
Rick Dempsey	71	145	38	.262	1	11
Alex Johnson	52	119	31	.261	1	15
Rick Bladt	52	117	26	.222	1	11
Rich Coggins	51	107	24	.224	1	6
Ron Blomberg	34	106	27	.255	4	17
Terry Whitfield	28	81	22	.272	0	7
Ed Brinkman	44	63	11	.175	0	2
Bob Oliver	18	38	5	.132	0	1
Kerry Dineen	7	22	8	.364	0	1
Dave Bergman	7	17	0	.000	0	0
Otto Vélez	6	8	2	.250	0	1
Larry Murray	6	1	0	.000	0	0
Eddie Leon	1	0	0	----	0	0

=== Pitching ===
= Indicates league leader

==== Starting pitchers ====
Note: G = Games pitched; IP = Innings pitched; W = Wins; L = Losses; ERA = Earned run average; SO = Strikeouts

Player	G	IP	W	L	ERA	SO
Catfish Hunter	39	328.0	23	14	2.58	177
Doc Medich	38	272.1	16	16	3.50	132
Rudy May	32	212.0	14	12	3.06	145
Pat Dobson	33	207.2	11	14	4.07	129
Larry Gura	26	151.1	7	8	3.51	65

==== Relief pitchers ====
Note: G = Games pitched; W = Wins; L = Losses; SV = Saves; ERA = Earned run average; SO = Strikeouts

Player	G	W	L	SV	ERA	SO
Sparky Lyle	49	5	7	6	3.12	65
Dick Tidrow	37	6	3	5	3.12	38
Tippy Martinez	23	1	2	8	2.68	20
Dave Pagan	13	0	0	1	4.06	18
Ron Guidry	10	0	1	0	3.45	15
Rick Sawyer	4	0	0	0	3.00	3
Mike Wallace	3	0	0	0	14.54	2

== Awards and honors ==
- Catfish Hunter, League leader, Complete Games (30)

All-Star Game

- Thurman Munson, Starter
- Graig Nettles, Starter
- Bobby Bonds, Starter
- Catfish Hunter, Reserve

== Farm system ==
Level	Team	League	Manager
AAA	Syracuse Chiefs	International League	Bobby Cox
AA	West Haven Yankees	Eastern League	Pete Ward
A	Fort Lauderdale Yankees	Florida State League	Leo Posada
A-Short Season	Oneonta Yankees	New York–Penn League	Mike Ferraro
