= 1975 Oakland Athletics season =

1975 Oakland Athletics
- American League West champions
- League: American League
- Division: West
- Ballpark: Oakland-Alameda County Coliseum
- City: Oakland, California
- Record: 98–64 (.605)
- Divisional place: 1st
- Owners: Charles O. Finley
- Managers: Alvin Dark
- Television: KPIX-TV
- Radio: KEEN (Monte Moore, Bob Waller)

The 1975 Oakland Athletics season was the 75th season for the Oakland Athletics franchise, all as members of the American League, and their 8th season in Oakland. Entering the season as the three-time defending World Series champions, the Athletics won their fifth consecutive American League West title with a record of 98 wins and 64 losses. They went on to play the Boston Red Sox in the 1975 American League Championship Series, losing in three straight games.

== Offseason ==
After the Athletics' victory over the Los Angeles Dodgers in the 1974 World Series under Alvin Dark, pitcher Catfish Hunter filed a grievance. He won the American League Cy Young Award in 1974 with a record of 25–12 and a league-leading 2.49 earned run average. Hunter uncovered a violation of his contract with Athletics owner Charlie Finley and the team that allowed him to become a free agent. The Athletics were to send half of Hunter's $100,000 annual salary to a North Carolina bank as payment on an annuity, but Finley did not comply.

On December 13, 1974, arbitrator Peter Seitz ruled in Hunter's favor. As a result, Hunter became a free agent, and signed a contract with the New York Yankees for the 1975 season. Despite the loss of Hunter, the Athletics repeated as A.L. West champions in 1975, but lost the ALCS to Boston in a 3-game sweep.

The Athletics led the league in arbitration filings with 13. Seven players settled before their hearings.

=== Notable transactions ===
- October 23, 1974: Manny Trillo, Darold Knowles and Bob Locker were traded by the Athletics to the Chicago Cubs for Billy Williams.
- October 23, 1974: Dan Ford and Dennis Myers (minors) were traded by the Athletics to the Minnesota Twins for Pat Bourque.
- November 11, 1974: Dal Maxvill was released by the Athletics.
- December 2, 1974: Tim Hosley was drafted from the Athletics by the Chicago Cubs in the 1974 rule 5 draft.
- January 9, 1975: Rob Picciolo was drafted by the Athletics in the 1st round (4th pick) of the 1975 Major League Baseball draft (secondary phase).
- March 28, 1975: Jesús Alou was released by the Athletics.

== Regular season ==
- At the All-Star Break, there were discussions of Bowie Kuhn's reappointment. Finley, New York owner George Steinbrenner and Baltimore owner Jerry Hoffberger were part of a group that wanted him gone. Finley was trying to convince the new owner of the Texas Rangers Brad Corbett that MLB needed a more dynamic commissioner. During the vote, Baltimore and New York decided to vote in favor of the commissioner's reappointment.
- By July 14, the Athletics had won 55 games, compared to 32 losses. Seven Athletics had been named to the All-Star Game.
- August 18, 1975: Charlie Finley was on the cover of Time magazine. It would be his last major profile in a national publication.

=== Relocation plans ===
- Finley received numerous offers for the Athletics. Horse owner Marge Everett wanted to purchase the team and relocate them to Seattle. Former San Francisco Giants manager Herman Franks led a group of 15 investors who had offered more than $15 million.
- Finley openly criticized fans for the lack of attendance. There were rumours of possible relocation to New Orleans, Seattle, and Toronto. In addition, there was talk of an ownership group relocating the San Francisco Giants to Toronto, with the possibility that Oakland would have the entire Bay Area to itself.
- In 1975, fed up with poor attendance in Oakland during the team's championship years, Finley pondered relocating the team. When Seattle filed a lawsuit against Major League Baseball over the move of the Seattle Pilots to Milwaukee, Finley and others came up with an elaborate shuffle which would move the ailing Chicago White Sox to Seattle. White Sox owner John Allyn was broke and placed under enormous pressure from fellow owners to sell his club to Seattle interests and undercut a lawsuit which Seattle had against them. As Charlie Finley had business interests in Chicago, he was prepared to move the Athletics to Chicago and be closer to his home in LaPorte, Indiana. Due to his 20-year lease with the city of Oakland (to expire in 1987), Finley was blocked. The scheme fell through when Arthur Allyn sold the White Sox to another colorful owner, Bill Veeck, who was not interested in leaving Chicago.

=== Season standings ===
AL West
Team	W	L	Pct.	GB	Home	Road
Oakland Athletics	98	64	.605	—	54‍–‍27	44‍–‍37
Kansas City Royals	91	71	.562	7	51‍–‍30	40‍–‍41
Texas Rangers	79	83	.488	19	39‍–‍41	40‍–‍42
Minnesota Twins	76	83	.478	20½	39‍–‍43	37‍–‍40
Chicago White Sox	75	86	.466	22½	42‍–‍39	33‍–‍47
California Angels	72	89	.447	25½	35‍–‍46	37‍–‍43

=== Record vs. opponents ===
1975 American League record Sources:
Team	BAL	BOS	CAL	CWS	CLE	DET	KC	MIL	MIN	NYY	OAK	TEX
Baltimore	—	9–9	6–6	7–4	10–8	12–4	7–5	14–4	6–6	8–10	4–8	7–5
Boston	9–9	—	6–6	8–4	7–11	13–5	7–5	10–8	10–2	11–5	6–6	8–4
California	6–6	6–6	—	9–9	3–9	6–5	4–14	7–5	8–10	7–5	7–11	9–9
Chicago	4–7	4–8	9–9	—	7–5	5–7	9–9	8–4	9–9	6–6	9–9	5–13
Cleveland	8–10	11–7	9–3	5–7	—	12–6	6–6	9–9	3–6	9–9	2–10	5–7
Detroit	4–12	5–13	5–6	7–5	6–12	—	6–6	7–11	4–8	6–12	6–6	1–11
Kansas City	5–7	5–7	14–4	9–9	6–6	6–6	—	7–5	11–7	7–5	11–7	14–4
Milwaukee	4–14	8–10	5–7	4–8	9–9	11–7	5–7	—	2–10	9–9	5–7	6–6
Minnesota	6–6	2–10	10–8	9–9	6–3	8–4	7–11	10–2	—	4–8	6–12	8–10
New York	10–8	5–11	5–7	6–6	9–9	12–6	5–7	9–9	8–4	—	6–6	8–4
Oakland	8–4	6–6	11–7	9–9	10–2	6–6	11–7	7–5	12–6	6–6	—	12–6
Texas	5–7	4–8	9–9	13–5	7–5	11–1	4–14	6–6	10–8	4–8	6–12	—

=== Notable transactions ===
- April 6, 1975: The Athletics sent a player to be named later and cash to the Chicago Cubs for Jim Todd. The Athletics completed the deal by sending Champ Summers to the Cubs on April 29.
- May 20, 1975: Blue Moon Odom and cash were traded by the Athletics to the Cleveland Indians for Dick Bosman and Jim Perry.
- June 3, 1975: Denny Walling was drafted in the 1st round (1st pick) of the Secondary Phase of the 1975 Major League Baseball draft.
- June 18, 1975: Brian Kingman was signed as an amateur free agent by the Athletics.
- August 29, 1975: Dal Maxvill was signed as a free agent by the Athletics.
- September 15, 1975: Rick Ingalls (minors) was traded by the Athletics to the Kansas City Royals for Mark Williams.

=== Roster ===
1975 Oakland Athletics
Roster
Pitchers: 37 Glenn Abbott; 39 Stan Bahnsen; 14 Vida Blue; 17 Dick Bosman; 34 Rollie Fingers; 33 Dave Hamilton; 30 Ken Holtzman; 25 Paul Lindblad; 20 Craig Mitchell; 16 Mike Norris; 13 Blue Moon Odom; 36 Jim Perry; 35 Sonny Siebert; 22 Jim Todd	Catchers: 10 Ray Fosse; 12 Larry Haney; 18 Gene Tenace; Infielders: 6 Sal Bando; 19 Bert Campaneris; 29 Phil Garner; 8 Billy Grabarkewitz; 21 Tommy Harper; 38 Jim Holt; 11 Ted Kubiak; 32 Ted Martínez; 41 Dal Maxvill; 11 Rich McKinney; 23 Gaylen Pitts; 26 Joe Rudi; 13 Tommy Sandt; 3 César Tovar; 28 Billy Williams	Outfielders: 31 Matt Alexander; 24 Charlie Chant; 1 Don Hopkins; 9 Reggie Jackson; 2 Ángel Mangual; 4 Billy North; 7 Denny Walling; 15 Claudell Washington; Other batters: 7 Charlie Sands; Designated runner: 3 Herb Washington	Manager: 5 Alvin Dark; Coaches: 44 Bobby Hofman; 41 Dal Maxvill; 42 Wes Stock; 43 Bobby Winkles

== Player stats ==
= Indicates team leader

= Indicates league leader

=== Batting ===
==== Starters by position ====
Note: Pos = Position; G = Games played; AB = At bats; H = Hits; Avg. = Batting average; HR = Home runs; RBI = Runs batted in

Pos	Player	G	AB	H	Avg.	HR	RBI
C	Gene Tenace	158	498	127	.255	29	87
1B	Joe Rudi	126	468	130	.278	21	75
2B	Phil Garner	160	488	120	.246	6	54
3B	Sal Bando	160	562	129	.230	15	78
SS	Bert Campaneris	137	509	135	.265	4	46
LF	Claudell Washington	148	590	182	.308	10	77
CF	Billy North	140	524	143	.273	1	43
RF	Reggie Jackson	157	593	150	.253	36	104
DH	Billy Williams	155	520	127	.244	23	81

==== Other batters ====
Note: G = Games played; AB = At bats; H = Hits; Avg. = Batting average; HR = Home runs; RBI = Runs batted in

Player	G	AB	H	Avg.	HR	RBI
Ray Fosse	82	136	19	.140	0	12
Jim Holt	102	123	27	.220	2	16
Ángel Mangual	62	109	24	.220	1	6
Ted Martínez	86	87	15	.172	0	3
Tommy Harper	34	69	22	.319	2	7
Ted Kubiak	20	28	7	.250	0	4
Larry Haney	47	26	5	.192	1	2
César Tovar	19	26	6	.231	0	3
Matt Alexander	63	10	1	.100	0	0
Dal Maxvill	20	10	2	.200	0	0
Denny Walling	6	8	1	.125	0	2
Rich McKinney	8	7	1	.143	0	2
Don Hopkins	82	6	1	.167	0	0
Charlie Chant	5	5	0	.000	0	0
Gaylen Pitts	10	3	1	.333	0	1
Charlie Sands	3	2	1	.500	0	0
Billy Grabarkewitz	6	2	0	.000	0	0
Herb Washington	13	0	0	----	0	0
Tommy Sandt	2	0	0	----	0	0

=== Pitching ===
==== Starting pitchers ====
Note: G = Games pitched; IP = Innings pitched; W = Wins; L = Losses; ERA = Earned run average; SO = Strikeouts

Player	G	IP	W	L	ERA	SO
Vida Blue	39	278.0	22	11	3.01	189
Ken Holtzman	39	266.1	18	14	3.14	122
Dick Bosman	22	122.2	11	4	3.52	42
Stan Bahnsen	21	100.0	6	7	3.24	49
Sonny Siebert	17	61.0	4	4	3.69	44
Mike Norris	4	16.2	1	0	0.00	5
Craig Mitchell	1	3.2	0	1	12.27	2

==== Other pitchers ====
Note: G = Games pitched; IP = Innings pitched; W = Wins; L = Losses; ERA = Earned run average; SO = Strikeouts

Player	G	IP	W	L	ERA	SO
Glenn Abbott	30	114.1	5	5	4.25	51
Jim Perry	15	67.2	3	4	4.66	33
Dave Hamilton	11	35.2	1	2	4.04	20
Blue Moon Odom	7	11.0	0	2	12.27	4

==== Relief pitchers ====
Note: G = Games pitched; W = Wins; L = Losses; SV = Saves; ERA = Earned run average; SO = Strikeouts

Player	G	W	L	SV	ERA	SO
Rollie Fingers	75	10	6	24	2.98	115
Paul Lindblad	68	9	1	7	2.72	58
Jim Todd	58	8	3	12	2.29	50

== Farm system ==
Level	Team	League	Manager
AAA	Tucson Toros	Pacific Coast League	Hank Aguirre
AA	Birmingham A's	Southern League	Harry Malmberg
A	Modesto A's	California League	Rene Lachemann
A-Short Season	Boise A's	Northwest League	Tom Trebelhorn
