= 1975 Minnesota Twins season =

1975 Minnesota Twins
- League: American League
- Division: West
- Ballpark: Metropolitan Stadium
- City: Bloomington, Minnesota
- Owners: Calvin Griffith (majority owner, with Thelma Griffith Haynes)
- General managers: Calvin Griffith
- Managers: Frank Quilici
- Television: WTCN (Larry Calton, Joe Boyle, Ray Scott)
- Radio: 830 WCCO AM (Herb Carneal, Larry Calton)

The 1975 Minnesota Twins season was the 15th season for the Minnesota Twins franchise in the Twin Cities of Minnesota, their 15th season at Metropolitan Stadium and the 75th overall in the American League. The Twins finished 76–83, fourth in the American League West.

== Offseason ==
- October 23, 1974: Pat Bourque was traded by the Twins to the Oakland Athletics for Dan Ford and Dennis Myers (minors).
- January 16, 1975: Harmon Killebrew was released by the Twins.

== Regular season ==
Having released Harmon Killebrew during the off-season, owner Calvin Griffith devised "Harmon Killebrew Day" as a promotion for the slugger's return with his new club, the Kansas City Royals. On Sunday, May 4, DH Killebrew greeted the crowd of just 14,805 with a first-inning home run. In the fifth inning, Minnesota pitcher Jim Hughes hit Harmon with a pitch.

Only one Twins player made the All-Star Game, second baseman Rod Carew. Only 737,156 fans attended Twins games, the lowest total in the American League.

On August 22, Dave McKay debuted in the majors as the starting third baseman for the Twins. In his first at bat leading off the third inning, he homered off Detroit's Vern Ruhle. Only one other Twin had homered in his first at bat – Rick Renick in 1968. The duo will be joined in history by Gary Gaetti (1981), Andre David (1984) and Eddie Rosario (2015), who homers on the first major-league pitch thrown to him.

Carew won his fifth AL batting title with a .359 average. Three pitchers had double digit wins: Jim Hughes (16–14), Bert Blyleven (15–10), and Dave Goltz (14–14).

=== Season standings ===
AL West
Team	W	L	Pct.	GB	Home	Road
Oakland Athletics	98	64	.605	—	54‍–‍27	44‍–‍37
Kansas City Royals	91	71	.562	7	51‍–‍30	40‍–‍41
Texas Rangers	79	83	.488	19	39‍–‍41	40‍–‍42
Minnesota Twins	76	83	.478	20½	39‍–‍43	37‍–‍40
Chicago White Sox	75	86	.466	22½	42‍–‍39	33‍–‍47
California Angels	72	89	.447	25½	35‍–‍46	37‍–‍43

=== Record vs. opponents ===
1975 American League record Sources:
Team	BAL	BOS	CAL	CWS	CLE	DET	KC	MIL	MIN	NYY	OAK	TEX
Baltimore	—	9–9	6–6	7–4	10–8	12–4	7–5	14–4	6–6	8–10	4–8	7–5
Boston	9–9	—	6–6	8–4	7–11	13–5	7–5	10–8	10–2	11–5	6–6	8–4
California	6–6	6–6	—	9–9	3–9	6–5	4–14	7–5	8–10	7–5	7–11	9–9
Chicago	4–7	4–8	9–9	—	7–5	5–7	9–9	8–4	9–9	6–6	9–9	5–13
Cleveland	8–10	11–7	9–3	5–7	—	12–6	6–6	9–9	3–6	9–9	2–10	5–7
Detroit	4–12	5–13	5–6	7–5	6–12	—	6–6	7–11	4–8	6–12	6–6	1–11
Kansas City	5–7	5–7	14–4	9–9	6–6	6–6	—	7–5	11–7	7–5	11–7	14–4
Milwaukee	4–14	8–10	5–7	4–8	9–9	11–7	5–7	—	2–10	9–9	5–7	6–6
Minnesota	6–6	2–10	10–8	9–9	6–3	8–4	7–11	10–2	—	4–8	6–12	8–10
New York	10–8	5–11	5–7	6–6	9–9	12–6	5–7	9–9	8–4	—	6–6	8–4
Oakland	8–4	6–6	11–7	9–9	10–2	6–6	11–7	7–5	12–6	6–6	—	12–6
Texas	5–7	4–8	9–9	13–5	7–5	11–1	4–14	6–6	10–8	4–8	6–12	—

=== Notable transactions ===
- June 14, 1975: Bobby Darwin was traded by the Twins to the Milwaukee Brewers for Johnny Briggs.

=== Roster ===
1975 Minnesota Twins
Roster
Pitchers: 20 Vic Albury; 16 Eddie Bane; 28 Bert Blyleven; 19 Tom Burgmeier; 17 Bill Butler; 24 Bill Campbell; 23 Ray Corbin; 21 Joe Decker; 30 Dave Goltz; 31 Jim Hughes; 32 Tom Johnson; 18 Mike Pazik; 18 Mark Wiley	Catchers: 14 Glenn Borgmann; 13 Tom Lundstedt; 8 Phil Roof; Infielders: 2,22 Johnny Briggs; 29 Rod Carew; 1 Sergio Ferrer; 25 Luis Gómez; 16 Tom Kelly; 22,2 Craig Kusick; 7 Dave McKay; 12 Eric Soderholm; 1 Jerry Terrell; 5 Danny Thompson	Outfielders: 10 Lyman Bostock; 4 Steve Braun; 11 Steve Brye; 2 Bobby Darwin; 15 Dan Ford; 9 Larry Hisle; 26 Mike Poepping; 7 Danny Walton; Other batters: 6 Tony Oliva	Manager: 43 Frank Quilici; Coaches: 44 Vern Morgan; 42 Ralph Rowe; 45 Lee Stange

== Player stats ==
= Indicates team leader

= Indicates league leader

=== Batting ===
==== Starters by position ====
Note: Pos = Position; G = Games played; AB = At bats; H = Hits; Avg. = Batting average; HR = Home runs; RBI = Runs batted in

Pos	Player	G	AB	H	Avg.	HR	RBI
C	Glenn Borgmann	125	352	73	.207	2	33
1B	Johnny Briggs	87	264	61	.231	7	39
2B	Rod Carew	143	535	192	.359	14	80
SS	Danny Thompson	112	355	96	.270	5	37
3B	Eric Soderholm	117	419	120	.286	11	58
LF	Steve Braun	136	453	137	.302	11	45
CF	Dan Ford	130	440	123	.280	15	59
RF	Lyman Bostock	98	369	104	.282	0	29
DH	Tony Oliva	131	455	123	.270	13	58

==== Other batters ====
Note: G = Games played; AB = At bats; H = Hits; Avg. = Batting average; HR = Home runs; RBI = Runs batted in

Player	G	AB	H	Avg.	HR	RBI
Jerry Terrell	108	385	110	.286	1	36
Larry Hisle	80	255	80	.314	11	51
Steve Brye	86	246	62	.252	9	34
Bobby Darwin	48	169	37	.219	5	18
Craig Kusick	57	156	37	.237	6	27
Tom Kelly	49	127	23	.181	1	11
Phil Roof	63	126	38	.302	7	21
Dave McKay	33	125	32	.256	2	16
Sergio Ferrer	32	81	20	.247	0	2
Luis Gómez	89	72	10	.139	0	5
Danny Walton	42	63	11	.175	1	8
Mike Poepping	14	37	5	.135	0	1
Tom Lundstedt	18	28	3	.107	0	1

=== Pitching ===
==== Starting pitchers ====
Note: G = Games pitched; IP = Innings pitched; W = Wins; L = Losses; ERA = Earned run average; SO = Strikeouts

Player	G	IP	W	L	ERA	SO
Bert Blyleven	35	275.2	15	10	3.00	233
Jim Hughes	37	249.2	16	14	3.82	130
Dave Goltz	32	243.0	14	14	3.67	128
Eddie Bane	4	28.1	3	1	2.86	14

==== Other pitchers ====
Note: G = Games pitched; IP = Innings pitched; W = Wins; L = Losses; ERA = Earned run average; SO = Strikeouts

Player	G	IP	W	L	ERA	SO
Vic Albury	32	135.0	6	7	4.53	72
Ray Corbin	18	89.2	5	7	5.12	49
Bill Butler	23	81.2	5	4	5.95	55
Mark Wiley	15	38.2	1	3	6.05	15
Joe Decker	10	26.1	1	3	8.54	8
Mike Pazik	5	19.2	0	4	8.24	8

==== Relief pitchers ====
Note: G = Games pitched; W = Wins; L = Losses; SV = Saves; ERA = Earned run average; SO = Strikeouts

Player	G	W	L	SV	ERA	SO
Tom Burgmeier	46	5	8	11	3.09	41
Bill Campbell	47	4	6	5	3.79	76
Tom Johnson	18	1	2	3	4.19	17

== Awards and honors ==
All-Star Game

- Rod Carew, Second Base, Starter

== Farm system ==
Level	Team	League	Manager
AAA	Tacoma Twins	Pacific Coast League	Cal Ermer
AA	Orlando Twins	Southern League	Dick Phillips
A	Reno Silver Sox	California League	Harry Warner
A	Wisconsin Rapids Twins	Midwest League	Johnny Goryl
Rookie	Elizabethton Twins	Appalachian League	Fred Waters

LEAGUE CHAMPIONS: Reno

Reno affiliation shared with San Diego Padres
