= Bobby Darwin =

American baseball player (born 1943)

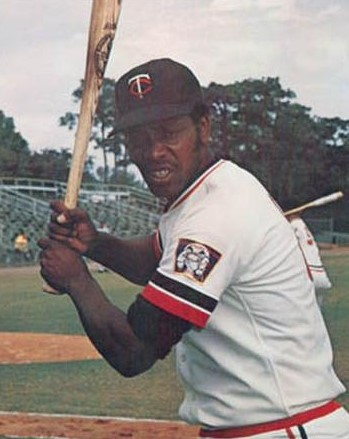
- Outfielder
- Born: February 16, 1943 (age 82); Los Angeles, California, U.S.
- Batted: Right Threw: Right

MLB debut
- September 30, 1962, for the Los Angeles Angels

Last MLB appearance
- August 18, 1977, for the Chicago Cubs

MLB statistics
- Batting average: .251
- Home runs: 83
- Runs batted in: 328
- Stats at Baseball Reference

Teams
- Los Angeles Angels (1962); Los Angeles Dodgers (1969, 1971); Minnesota Twins (1972–1975); Milwaukee Brewers (1975–1976); Boston Red Sox (1976–1977); Chicago Cubs (1977)

Arthur Bobby Lee Darwin (born February 16, 1943) is an American professional baseball scout and a former Major League Baseball pitcher and outfielder who played for the Los Angeles Angels (1962), Los Angeles Dodgers (1969-1971), Minnesota Twins (1972-1975), Milwaukee Brewers (1975-1976), Boston Red Sox (1976-1977) and Chicago Cubs (1977).

Darwin began his career as a right-handed pitcher, appearing in one game with the Angels at the age of 19. After spending most of the next decade in the minor leagues, during which time he switched positions to center field, Darwin established himself as a Major League player with the Twins in 1972. In his first three full seasons (1972-1974), Darwin hit 65 home runs and drove in 264 runs, finishing in the top ten in the American League in home runs and runs batted in for both 1972 and 1974, while also leading the American League in strikeouts in all three of those seasons. He was dealt from the Twins to the Brewers for Johnny Briggs on June 14, 1975. He finished his career as a part-time player in 1976 and 1977.

Darwin finished his pro career after the 1978 season. In 1983, he became a scout for the Dodgers, and was honored for longtime service with the club in 2010.

Darwin also played winter baseball in the Mexican Pacific League with the Naranjeros de Hermosillo and Águilas de Mexicali.
