= Tom Robson (baseball) =

American baseball player (1946–2021)

- First baseman
- Born: January 15, 1946; Rochester, New York, U.S.
- Died: April 20, 2021 (aged 75); Chandler, Arizona, U.S.
- Batted: Right Threw: Right

MLB debut
- September 14, 1974, for the Texas Rangers

Last MLB appearance
- September 18, 1975, for the Texas Rangers

MLB statistics
- Batting average: .208
- Home runs: 0
- Runs batted in: 4

NPB statistics
- Batting average: .209
- Home runs: 3
- Runs batted in: 9
- Stats at Baseball Reference

Teams
- As player: Texas Rangers (1974–1975); Nankai Hawks (1976); As coach: Texas Rangers (1986–1992); Chiba Lotte Marines (1995); New York Mets (1997–2000, 2002); Cincinnati Reds (2003); Chiba Lotte Marines (2004)

Thomas James Robson (January 15, 1946 – April 20, 2021) was an American Major League Baseball player, coach and author. He played first base and designated hitter for two seasons for the Texas Rangers. He is author of The Hitting Edge.

== Personal life ==
Robson was born January 15, 1946, in Rochester, New York. He attended Camelback High School in Phoenix, Arizona. He attended Phoenix College, a community college, and later Utah State University in Logan. He was drafted by the New York Mets in the 50th round of the 1967 amateur draft.

His nephew is Major League third baseman Mike Moustakas.

On April 20, 2021, Robson died of natural causes, aged 75.

== Professional baseball career ==
He played for the Texas Rangers for six games during the 1974 season and 17 games during the 1975 season. After batting .320 with 13 home runs with the Spokane Indians, he was acquired by the New York Yankees from the Rangers organization at the Winter Meetings on December 9, 1975. He ended his playing career in Nippon Professional Baseball with the Nankai Hawks in 1976. After retiring, he became a coach in the Rangers' organization. He spent seven years on the coaching staff of Rangers' manager Bobby Valentine, followed Valentine back to Japan to coach with the Chiba Lotte Marines 2003 and then followed him again to New York join his staff as the hitting instructor and, later, bench coach for the Mets. He served as the Cincinnati Reds' hitting coach for the first four months of the 2003 campaign under Bob Boone. In 2004, he returned to Japan and reunited with Valentine to coach for the Chiba Lotte Marines.
