= Johnny Briggs (baseball) =

American baseball player (born 1944)

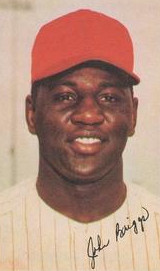
- Outfielder
- Born: March 10, 1944 (age 82); Paterson, New Jersey, U.S.
- Batted: Left Threw: Left

Professional debut
- MLB: April 17, 1964, for the Philadelphia Phillies
- NPB: April 3, 1976, for the Lotte Orions

Last appearance
- MLB: September 28, 1975, for the Minnesota Twins
- NPB: June 4, 1976, for the Lotte Orions

MLB statistics
- Batting average: .253
- Home runs: 139
- Runs batted in: 507

NPB statistics
- Batting average: .227
- Home runs: 7
- Runs batted in: 24
- Stats at Baseball Reference

Teams
- Philadelphia Phillies (1964–1971); Milwaukee Brewers (1971–1975); Minnesota Twins (1975); Lotte Orions (1976)

Career highlights and awards
- Milwaukee Brewers Wall of Honor

1973 photo of Briggs for the Milwaukee Brewers

John Edward Briggs (born March 10, 1944) is an American former professional baseball left fielder who played in Major League Baseball (MLB) for the Philadelphia Phillies (1964–1971), Milwaukee Brewers (1971–1975), and Minnesota Twins (1975). He batted and threw left-handed, and was listed as 6 feet 1 inch (1.85 m) tall and 190 pounds (86 kg).

Briggs was born in Paterson, New Jersey, where he played high school baseball at Eastside High School. He then moved on to Seton Hall University. Signed by the Phillies in 1963, he broke into pro baseball with the Bakersfield Bears of the Class A California League that season. Briggs batted .297 with 21 home runs, 20 doubles and six triples. His production compelled the Phillies to promote him to their 40-man roster for 1964, then to keep him on their 25-man regular-season squad to prevent Briggs from being nabbed by another MLB club in the first-year player draft in effect from 1959–1964.

Although as a 20-year-old, Briggs played sparingly in 1964 (with just 76 plate appearances), he would win a platoon outfield spot with Philadelphia in 1965 and never return to the minor leagues. He appeared in over 100 games from 1967 through his final MLB campaign in 1975. He was traded from the Phillies to the Brewers for Pete Koegel and Ray Peters on April 22, 1971. On August 4, 1973, when, while batting leadoff, he went 6-for-6, with two doubles and two runs scored, to spark the Brewers to a 9-4 road victory, over the Cleveland Indians. He was dealt from the Brewers to the Twins for Bobby Darwin on June 14, 1975.

In his 12-season big league career, Briggs posted a .253 batting average, a .355 on-base percentage, with 1,041 hits, 170 doubles, 43 triples, 139 home runs, and 507 run batted in (RBI), in 1,366 games played. After his last MLB season, he played one season for the Lotte Orions of Nippon Professional Baseball (NPB), in 1976.

== See also ==
- List of Major League Baseball single-game hits leaders
