= 1975 Cleveland Indians season =

1975 Cleveland Indians
- League: American League
- Division: East
- Ballpark: Cleveland Municipal Stadium
- City: Cleveland, Ohio
- Owners: Nick Mileti
- General managers: Phil Seghi
- Managers: Frank Robinson
- Television: WJW-TV
- Radio: WWWE

The 1975 Cleveland Indians season was a season in American baseball. It involved the Indians competing in the American League East, where they finished fourth with a record of 79–80.

== Offseason ==
One highlight of the season was the arrival of Frank Robinson to the club. Prior to the start of the season, the Indians named him player-manager, giving him distinction of being the first black manager in Major League Baseball history.

=== Notable transactions ===
- February 25, 1975: Dave Duncan and Al McGrew (minors) were traded by the Indians to the Baltimore Orioles for Boog Powell and Don Hood.

== Regular season ==
Earl Averill
CF
Retired 1975

=== Season standings ===
AL East
Team	W	L	Pct.	GB	Home	Road
Boston Red Sox	95	65	.594	—	47‍–‍34	48‍–‍31
Baltimore Orioles	90	69	.566	4½	44‍–‍33	46‍–‍36
New York Yankees	83	77	.519	12	43‍–‍35	40‍–‍42
Cleveland Indians	79	80	.497	15½	41‍–‍39	38‍–‍41
Milwaukee Brewers	68	94	.420	28	36‍–‍45	32‍–‍49
Detroit Tigers	57	102	.358	37½	31‍–‍49	26‍–‍53

=== Record vs. opponents ===
1975 American League record Sources:
Team	BAL	BOS	CAL	CWS	CLE	DET	KC	MIL	MIN	NYY	OAK	TEX
Baltimore	—	9–9	6–6	7–4	10–8	12–4	7–5	14–4	6–6	8–10	4–8	7–5
Boston	9–9	—	6–6	8–4	7–11	13–5	7–5	10–8	10–2	11–5	6–6	8–4
California	6–6	6–6	—	9–9	3–9	6–5	4–14	7–5	8–10	7–5	7–11	9–9
Chicago	4–7	4–8	9–9	—	7–5	5–7	9–9	8–4	9–9	6–6	9–9	5–13
Cleveland	8–10	11–7	9–3	5–7	—	12–6	6–6	9–9	3–6	9–9	2–10	5–7
Detroit	4–12	5–13	5–6	7–5	6–12	—	6–6	7–11	4–8	6–12	6–6	1–11
Kansas City	5–7	5–7	14–4	9–9	6–6	6–6	—	7–5	11–7	7–5	11–7	14–4
Milwaukee	4–14	8–10	5–7	4–8	9–9	11–7	5–7	—	2–10	9–9	5–7	6–6
Minnesota	6–6	2–10	10–8	9–9	6–3	8–4	7–11	10–2	—	4–8	6–12	8–10
New York	10–8	5–11	5–7	6–6	9–9	12–6	5–7	9–9	8–4	—	6–6	8–4
Oakland	8–4	6–6	11–7	9–9	10–2	6–6	11–7	7–5	12–6	6–6	—	12–6
Texas	5–7	4–8	9–9	13–5	7–5	11–1	4–14	6–6	10–8	4–8	6–12	—

=== Notable transactions ===
- May 20, 1975: Dick Bosman and Jim Perry were traded by the Indians to the Oakland Athletics for Blue Moon Odom and cash.
- June 3, 1975: Rick Cerone was drafted by the Indians in the 1st round (7th pick) of the 1975 Major League Baseball draft.
- June 7, 1975: Blue Moon Odom and a player to be named later were traded by the Indians to the Atlanta Braves for Roric Harrison. The Indians completed the deal by sending Rob Belloir to the Braves on June 16.
- June 13, 1975: Gaylord Perry was traded by the Indians to the Texas Rangers for Jim Bibby, Jackie Brown, Rick Waits, and $100,000.

=== Opening Day Lineup ===
Opening Day Starters
#	Name	Position
23	Oscar Gamble	LF
20	Frank Robinson	DH
21	George Hendrick	CF
24	Charlie Spikes	RF
26	Boog Powell	1B
7	John Ellis	C
25	Buddy Bell	3B
10	Jack Brohamer	2B
12	Ed Crosby	SS
36	Gaylord Perry	P

=== Roster ===
1975 Cleveland Indians
Roster
Pitchers: 42 Larry Andersen; 47 Fred Beene; 22 Jim Bibby; 27 Dick Bosman; 31 Jackie Brown; 35 Tom Buskey; 37 Dennis Eckersley; 27 Roric Harrison; 32 Don Hood; 34 Jim Kern; 17 Dave LaRoche; 13 Blue Moon Odom; 36 Gaylord Perry; 31 Jim Perry; 16 Fritz Peterson; 33 Eric Raich; 40 Bob Reynolds; 44 Jim Strickland; 36 Rick Waits	Catchers: 8 Alan Ashby; 4 Rick Cerone; 7 John Ellis; Infielders: 25 Buddy Bell; 10 Jack Brohamer; 9 Rico Carty; 12 Ed Crosby; 15 Frank Duffy; 18 Duane Kuiper; 30 Joe Lis; 14 Tommy McCraw; 26 Boog Powell; 4 Bill Sudakis	Outfielders: 1 Ken Berry; 23 Oscar Gamble; 21 George Hendrick; 22 Leron Lee; 29 John Lowenstein; 28 Rick Manning; 11 Tommy Smith; 24 Charlie Spikes; Other batters: 20 Frank Robinson	Manager: 20 Frank Robinson; Coaches: 6 Dave Garcia (Third Base); 2 Harvey Haddix (Pitching); 14 Tommy McCraw (First Base); 3 Jeff Torborg (Bullpen)

== Player stats ==
=== Batting ===
Note: G = Games played; AB = At bats; R = Runs scored; H = Hits; 2B = Doubles; 3B = Triples; HR = Home runs; RBI = Runs batted in; AVG = Batting average; SB = Stolen bases

Player	G	AB	R	H	2B	3B	HR	RBI	AVG	SB
Alan Ashby	90	254	32	57	10	1	5	32	.224	3
Buddy Bell	153	553	66	150	20	4	10	59	.271	6
Ken Berry	25	40	6	8	1	0	0	1	.200	0
Jack Brohamer	69	217	15	53	5	0	6	16	.244	2
Rico Carty	118	383	57	118	19	1	18	64	.308	2
Rick Cerone	7	12	1	3	1	0	0	0	.250	0
Ed Crosby	61	128	12	30	3	0	0	7	.234	0
Frank Duffy	146	482	44	117	22	2	1	47	.243	10
John Ellis	92	296	22	68	11	1	7	32	.230	0
Oscar Gamble	121	348	60	91	16	3	15	45	.261	11
George Hendrick	145	561	82	145	21	2	24	86	.258	6
Duane Kuiper	90	346	42	101	11	1	0	25	.292	19
Leron Lee	13	23	3	3	1	0	0	0	.130	1
Joe Lis	9	13	4	4	2	0	2	8	.308	0
John Lowenstein	91	265	37	64	5	1	12	33	.242	15
Rick Manning	120	480	69	137	16	5	3	35	.285	19
Tommy McCraw	23	51	7	14	1	1	2	5	.275	4
Boog Powell	134	435	64	129	18	0	27	86	.297	1
Frank Robinson	49	118	19	28	5	0	9	24	.237	0
Tommy Smith	8	8	0	1	0	0	0	2	.125	0
Charlie Spikes	111	345	41	79	13	3	11	33	.229	7
Bill Sudakis	20	46	4	9	0	0	1	3	.196	0
Team totals	159	5404	688	1409	201	25	153	643	.261	106

=== Pitching ===
Note: W = Wins; L = Losses; ERA = Earned run average; G = Games pitched; GS = Games started; SV = Saves; IP = Innings pitched; H = Hits allowed; R = Runs allowed; ER = Earned runs allowed; BB = Walks allowed; K = Strikeouts

Player	W	L	ERA	G	GS	SV	IP	H	R	ER	BB	K
Larry Andersen	0	0	4.76	3	0	0	5.2	4	3	3	2	4
Fred Beene	1	0	6.94	19	1	1	46.2	63	42	36	25	20
Jim Bibby	5	9	3.20	24	12	1	112.2	99	48	40	50	62
Dick Bosman	0	2	4.08	6	3	0	28.2	33	17	13	8	11
Jackie Brown	1	2	4.28	25	3	1	69.1	72	40	33	29	41
Tom Buskey	5	3	2.57	50	0	7	77.0	69	27	22	29	29
Dennis Eckersley	13	7	2.60	34	24	2	186.2	147	61	54	90	152
Roric Harrison	7	7	4.79	19	19	0	126.0	137	71	67	46	52
Don Hood	6	10	4.39	29	19	0	135.1	136	76	66	57	51
Jim Kern	1	2	3.77	13	7	0	71.2	60	31	30	45	55
Dave LaRoche	5	3	2.19	61	0	17	82.1	61	26	20	57	94
Blue Moon Odom	1	0	2.61	3	1	0	10.1	4	3	3	8	10
Gaylord Perry	6	9	3.55	15	15	0	121.2	120	57	48	34	85
Jim Perry	1	6	6.69	8	6	0	37.2	46	34	28	18	11
Fritz Peterson	14	8	3.94	25	25	0	146.1	154	73	64	40	47
Eric Raich	7	8	5.54	18	17	0	92.2	118	61	57	31	34
Bob Reynolds	0	2	4.66	5	0	2	9.2	11	7	5	3	5
Jim Strickland	0	0	1.93	4	0	1	4.2	4	1	1	2	3
Rick Waits	6	2	2.94	16	7	1	70.1	57	25	23	25	34
Team totals	79	80	3.84	159	159	33	1435.1	1395	703	613	599	800

== Awards and honors ==
All-Star Game

- George Hendrick, reserve

== Farm system ==
Level	Team	League	Manager
AAA	Oklahoma City 89ers	American Association	Red Davis
AA	San Antonio Brewers	Texas League	Woody Smith
A	San Jose Bees	California League	Del Youngblood
Rookie	GCL Indians	Gulf Coast League	Tony Pacheco
