= 1975 Chicago White Sox season =

1975 Chicago White Sox
- League: American League
- Division: West
- Ballpark: Comiskey Park
- City: Chicago
- Owners: John Allyn
- General managers: Roland Hemond
- Managers: Chuck Tanner
- Television: WSNS-TV (Harry Caray, J. C. Martin)
- Radio: WMAQ (AM) (Harry Caray, Bill Mercer)

The 1975 Chicago White Sox season was the team's 75th season in Major League Baseball, and its 76th season overall. They finished with a record of 75–86, good enough for fifth place in the American League West, 22½ games behind the first-place Oakland Athletics. This was the final season that the White Sox wore their Go-Go Sox-era uniforms. Towards the end of the 1990 season the team reintroduced the Go-Go Sox uniforms (replacing the red hat and pinstripes with black) and have remained the teams main uniform ever since.

== Offseason ==
- December 3, 1974: Dick Allen was traded by the White Sox to the Atlanta Braves for a player to be named later and cash. The Braves completed the deal by sending Jim Essian to the White Sox on May 15, 1975.
- January 2, 1975: Joe Henderson was purchased from the White Sox by the Cincinnati Reds.

== Regular season ==
- The proposed sale of the Chicago White Sox presented opportunities for the Oakland Athletics. A group from Seattle was ready to purchase the White Sox and move them to Seattle. As Charlie Finley had business interests in Chicago, he was prepared to move the Athletics to Chicago. Due to his 20-year lease with the city of Oakland (to expire in 1987), Finley was blocked. In the end, White Sox owner Arthur Allyn sold to Bill Veeck, who kept the White Sox in Chicago.

=== Season standings ===
AL West
Team	W	L	Pct.	GB	Home	Road
Oakland Athletics	98	64	.605	—	54‍–‍27	44‍–‍37
Kansas City Royals	91	71	.562	7	51‍–‍30	40‍–‍41
Texas Rangers	79	83	.488	19	39‍–‍41	40‍–‍42
Minnesota Twins	76	83	.478	20½	39‍–‍43	37‍–‍40
Chicago White Sox	75	86	.466	22½	42‍–‍39	33‍–‍47
California Angels	72	89	.447	25½	35‍–‍46	37‍–‍43

=== Record vs. opponents ===
1975 American League record Sources:
Team	BAL	BOS	CAL	CWS	CLE	DET	KC	MIL	MIN	NYY	OAK	TEX
Baltimore	—	9–9	6–6	7–4	10–8	12–4	7–5	14–4	6–6	8–10	4–8	7–5
Boston	9–9	—	6–6	8–4	7–11	13–5	7–5	10–8	10–2	11–5	6–6	8–4
California	6–6	6–6	—	9–9	3–9	6–5	4–14	7–5	8–10	7–5	7–11	9–9
Chicago	4–7	4–8	9–9	—	7–5	5–7	9–9	8–4	9–9	6–6	9–9	5–13
Cleveland	8–10	11–7	9–3	5–7	—	12–6	6–6	9–9	3–6	9–9	2–10	5–7
Detroit	4–12	5–13	5–6	7–5	6–12	—	6–6	7–11	4–8	6–12	6–6	1–11
Kansas City	5–7	5–7	14–4	9–9	6–6	6–6	—	7–5	11–7	7–5	11–7	14–4
Milwaukee	4–14	8–10	5–7	4–8	9–9	11–7	5–7	—	2–10	9–9	5–7	6–6
Minnesota	6–6	2–10	10–8	9–9	6–3	8–4	7–11	10–2	—	4–8	6–12	8–10
New York	10–8	5–11	5–7	6–6	9–9	12–6	5–7	9–9	8–4	—	6–6	8–4
Oakland	8–4	6–6	11–7	9–9	10–2	6–6	11–7	7–5	12–6	6–6	—	12–6
Texas	5–7	4–8	9–9	13–5	7–5	11–1	4–14	6–6	10–8	4–8	6–12	—

=== Opening Day lineup ===
- Nyls Nyman, LF
- Jorge Orta, 2B
- Buddy Bradford, RF
- Deron Johnson, DH
- Ken Henderson, CF
- Bill Melton, 3B
- Bucky Dent, SS
- Carlos May, 1B
- Brian Downing, C
- Wilbur Wood, P

=== Notable transactions ===
- May 8, 1975: Bill Sharp was traded by the White Sox to the Milwaukee Brewers for Bob Coluccio.
- June 3, 1975: Marv Foley was drafted by the White Sox in the 17th round of the 1975 Major League Baseball draft.
- June 15, 1975: Tony Muser was traded by the White Sox to the Baltimore Orioles for Jesse Jefferson.

=== Roster ===
1975 Chicago White Sox
Roster
Pitchers: 40 Lloyd Allen; 45 Stan Bahnsen; 51 Terry Forster; 32 Bill Gogolewski; 54 Goose Gossage; 26 Dave Hamilton; 44 Rich Hinton; 25 Jesse Jefferson; 36 Jim Kaat; 45 Chris Knapp; 27 Ken Kravec; 55 Jack Kucek; 46 Dan Osborn; 41 Claude Osteen; 38 Jim Otten; 26 Skip Pitlock; 42 Tim Stoddard; 34 Cecil Upshaw; 40 Pete Vuckovich; 28 Wilbur Wood	Catchers: 16 Brian Downing; 8 Pete Varney; Infielders: 30 Bucky Dent; 23 Lamar Johnson; 2 Chet Lemon; 17 Carlos May; 14 Bill Melton; 11 Jerry Moses; 25 Tony Muser; 6 Jorge Orta; 9 Lee Richard; 19 Mike Squires; 1 Bill Stein	Outfielders: 22 Buddy Bradford; 5 Bob Coluccio; 22 Jerry Hairston; 24 Ken Henderson; 18 Pat Kelly; 20 Nyls Nyman; 5 Bill Sharp	Manager: 7 Chuck Tanner; Coaches: 37 Joe Lonnett; 31 Jim Mahoney; 35 Alex Monchak; 39 Glen Rosenbaum; 33 Johnny Sain

== Game log ==
=== Regular season ===
Legend
	White Sox win
	White Sox loss
	Postponement
	Eliminated from playoff race
**Bold**	White Sox team member

1975 regular season game log: 75–86 (Home: 42–39; Away: 33–47)
April: 7–13 (Home: 1–5; Away: 6–8)

#	Date	Time (CT)	Opponent	Score	Win	Loss	Save	Time of Game	Attendance	Record	Box/ Streak

May: 13–11 (Home: 9–5; Away: 4–6)

#	Date	Time (CT)	Opponent	Score	Win	Loss	Save	Time of Game	Attendance	Record	Box/ Streak

June: 15–14 (Home: 11–7; Away: 4–7)

#	Date	Time (CT)	Opponent	Score	Win	Loss	Save	Time of Game	Attendance	Record	Box/ Streak

July: 15–14 (Home: 9–4; Away: 5–10)

#	Date	Time (CT)	Opponent	Score	Win	Loss	Save	Time of Game	Attendance	Record	Box/ Streak
—	July 15	7:15 p.m. CDT	**46th All-Star Game in Milwaukee, WI**								

August: 15–17 (Home: 8–7; Away: 7–10)

#	Date	Time (CT)	Opponent	Score	Win	Loss	Save	Time of Game	Attendance	Record	Box/ Streak

September: 10–17 (Home: 4–11; Away: 6–6)

#	Date	Time (CT)	Opponent	Score	Win	Loss	Save	Time of Game	Attendance	Record	Box/ Streak

== Player stats ==
=== Batting ===
Note: G = Games played; AB = At bats; R = Runs scored; H = Hits; 2B = Doubles; 3B = Triples; HR = Home runs; RBI = Runs batted in; BB = Base on balls; SO = Strikeouts; AVG = Batting average; SB = Stolen bases

Player	G	AB	R	H	2B	3B	HR	RBI	BB	SO	AVG	SB
Buddy Bradford, RF, LF, DH	25	58	8	9	3	1	2	15	8	22	.155	3
Bob Coluccio, OF	61	161	22	33	4	2	4	13	13	34	.205	4
Bucky Dent, SS	157	602	52	159	29	4	3	58	36	48	.264	2
Brian Downing, C	138	420	58	101	12	1	7	41	76	75	.240	13
Jerry Hairston, LF, DH, RF	69	219	26	62	8	0	0	23	46	23	.283	1
Ken Henderson, CF	140	513	65	129	20	3	9	53	74	65	.251	5
Deron Johnson, DH, 1B	148	555	66	129	25	1	18	72	48	117	.232	0
Lamar Johnson, 1B, DH	8	30	2	6	3	0	1	1	1	5	.200	0
Pat Kelly, RF, DH	133	471	73	129	21	7	9	45	58	69	.274	18
Chet Lemon, 3B, DH, CF	9	35	2	9	2	0	0	1	2	6	.257	1
Carlos May, 1B, LF, DH	128	454	55	123	19	2	8	53	67	46	.271	12
Bill Melton, 3B, DH	149	512	62	123	16	0	15	70	78	106	.251	5
Jerry Moses, 1B	2	2	1	1	0	1	0	0	0	0	.500	0
Tony Muser, 1B	43	111	11	27	3	0	0	6	7	8	.243	2
Nyls Nyman, OF	106	327	36	74	6	3	2	28	11	34	.226	10
Jorge Orta, 2B	140	542	64	165	26	10	11	83	48	67	.304	16
Lee Richard, SS, 3B, DH, 2B	43	49	11	9	0	1	0	5	4	7	.200	2
Bill Sharp, OF	18	35	1	7	0	0	0	4	2	3	.200	0
Mike Squires, 1B	20	65	5	15	0	0	0	4	8	5	.231	3
Bill Stein, 2B, 3B, DH	76	226	23	61	7	1	3	21	18	32	.270	2
Pete Varney, C	36	107	12	29	5	1	2	8	6	28	.271	2
Team totals	161	5490	655	1400	209	38	94	604	611	800	.255	101

=== Pitching ===
= Indicates league leader

Note: W = Wins; L = Losses; ERA = Earned run average; G = Games pitched; GS = Games started; SV = Saves; IP = Innings pitched; H = Hits allowed; R = Runs allowed; ER = Earned runs allowed; HR = Home runs allowed; BB = Walks allowed; K = Strikeouts

Player	W	L	ERA	G	GS	SV	IP	H	R	ER	HR	BB	K
Lloyd Allen	0	2	11.81	3	2	0	5.1	8	7	7	2	6	2
Stan Bahnsen	4	6	6.01	12	12	0	67.1	78	49	45	9	40	31
Terry Forster	3	3	2.19	17	1	4	37.0	30	12	9	0	28	32
Bill Gogolewski	0	0	5.24	19	0	2	55.0	61	35	32	5	31	37
Goose Gossage	9	8	1.84	62	0	26	141.2	99	32	29	3	85	130
Dave Hamilton	6	5	2.84	30	1	6	69.2	63	23	22	4	31	51
Rich Hinton	1	0	4.82	15	0	0	37.1	41	22	20	2	16	30
Jesse Jefferson	5	9	5.10	22	21	0	107.2	100	69	61	11	95	67
Jim Kaat	20	14	3.11	43	41	0	303.2	321	121	105	20	77	142
Chris Knapp	0	0	4.50	2	0	0	2.0	2	1	1	0	4	3
Ken Kravec	0	1	6.23	2	1	0	4.1	1	3	3	0	8	1
Jack Kucek	0	0	4.91	2	0	0	3.2	9	2	2	0	4	2
Ozzie Osborn	3	0	4.50	24	0	0	58.0	57	29	29	2	38	38
Claude Osteen	7	16	4.36	37	37	0	204.1	237	110	99	16	94	63
Jim Otten	0	0	6.75	2	0	0	5.1	4	5	4	1	7	3
Skip Pitlock	0	0	0.00	1	0	0	0.0	1	0	0	0	0	0
Tim Stoddard	0	0	9.00	1	0	0	1.0	2	1	1	1	0	0
Cecil Upshaw	1	1	3.23	29	0	1	47.1	49	19	17	5	24	22
Pete Vuckovich	0	1	13.06	4	2	0	10.1	17	15	15	0	8	5
Wilbur Wood	16	20	4.11	43	43	0	291.1	309	148	133	26	97	140
Team totals	75	86	3.93	161	161	39	1452.1	1489	703	634	107	693	799

== Farm system ==
Level	Team	League	Manager
AAA	Denver Bears	American Association	Loren Babe
AA	Knoxville Knox Sox	Southern League	Jim Napier
A	Appleton Foxes	Midwest League	Gordon Lund
Rookie	GCL White Sox	Gulf Coast League	Joe Jones
