= Bill Sharp (baseball) =

American baseball player (born 1950)

- Outfielder
- Born: January 18, 1950 (age 76); Lima, Ohio, U.S.
- Batted: Left Threw: Left

MLB debut
- May 26, 1973, for the Chicago White Sox

Last MLB appearance
- September 17, 1976, for the Milwaukee Brewers

MLB statistics
- Batting average: .255
- Home runs: 9
- Runs batted in: 95
- Stats at Baseball Reference

Teams
- Chicago White Sox (1973–1975); Milwaukee Brewers (1975–1976)

William Howard Sharp (born January 18, 1950) is a former outfielder in Major League Baseball (MLB). He played for the Chicago White Sox and Milwaukee Brewers.

Sharp graduated in 1968 from Lima Senior High School where he played baseball, basketball and football. As a senior basketball player, he led his team in assists en route to an appearance in the state tournament semifinals. He was a member of the school's inaugural athletics hall of fame class in 2018.

Sharp earned a scholarship to play college football at Ohio State. After playing for Woody Hayes, he suffered a separated shoulder which convinced him to give up football and focus on baseball. He was taken with the first pick of the second round of the 1971 MLB draft by the Chicago White Sox. He was the first college player taken and was selected before future Hall of Famers George Brett and Mike Schmidt.

Sharp made his Major League debut on May 26, 1973, in a 22-inning game at White Sox Park in Chicago. He recorded his first hit on May 28, a first inning triple off Dick Tidrow. Sharp became the team's starting right fielder the following season, taking over for Pat Kelly beginning in June.

Sharp was traded from the White Sox to the Brewers for Bob Coluccio on May 8, 1975. He started in center field for the Brewers that night and then again for the majority of the team's remaining games that season. Sharp's least successful Major League season came in 1976 when, in 78 games, he would slash .244/.288/.267. Due in large part to knee injuries, Sharp's professional career ended at age 27 in the minor leagues in 1977 after five games for the Spokane Indians.

After retirement, Sharp worked as an executive for Blue Cross Blue Shield of Illinois and managed the Dakota Rattlers of the independent Prairie League in Bismarck, North Dakota to losing records in 1995 and 1996.

He and his wife, Guyneth, had three sons, James, Matthew and Gavin.
