= Tommy Bianco =

American baseball player

- Third baseman
- Born: December 16, 1952 (age 73); Rockville Centre, New York, U.S.
- Batted: Both Threw: Right

MLB debut
- May 28, 1975, for the Milwaukee Brewers

Last MLB appearance
- September 27, 1975, for the Milwaukee Brewers

MLB statistics
- Batting average: .176
- Runs scored: 6
- Hits: 6
- Stats at Baseball Reference

Teams
- Milwaukee Brewers (1975)

Thomas Anthony Bianco (born December 16, 1952) is an American former Major League Baseball third baseman for the Milwaukee Brewers. He was born in Rockville Centre, New York. He was a switch hitter and threw right handed.

Bianco was drafted by the Milwaukee Brewers as the 3rd overall pick in the 1st round of the 1971 draft. Bianco made his major league debut on May 28, 1975. He played 18 career games in Major League Baseball. He had 6 hits in 34 at bats (a .176 batting average) and no home runs or RBIs.

He currently is a hitting instructor at Dave Lemanczyk's baseball academy in Long Island, NY.
