= Bob Coluccio =

American baseball player (born 1951)

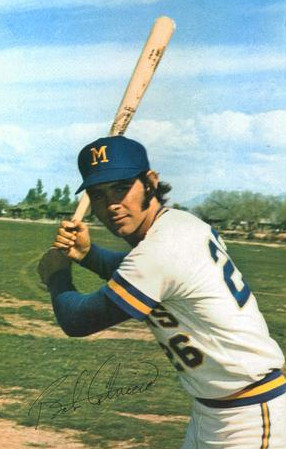
- Coluccio in 1973
- Outfielder
- Born: October 2, 1951 (age 74); Centralia, Washington, U.S.
- Batted: Right Threw: Right

MLB debut
- April 15, 1973, for the Milwaukee Brewers

Last MLB appearance
- July 28, 1978, for the St. Louis Cardinals

MLB statistics
- Batting average: .220
- Home runs: 26
- Runs batted in: 114
- Stats at Baseball Reference

Teams
- Milwaukee Brewers (1973–1975); Chicago White Sox (1975, 1977); St. Louis Cardinals (1978)

Robert Pasquali Coluccio (born October 2, 1951) is an American former professional baseball player. He played all or part of five seasons in Major League Baseball (MLB), between 1973 and 1978, for the Milwaukee Brewers, Chicago White Sox, and St. Louis Cardinals, primarily as an outfielder.

The Seattle Pilots drafted Coluccio in the 17th round of the 1969 MLB draft out of Centralia High School. Coluccio chose to sign with the Pilots for $500 monthly (equivalent to $4,390 in 2025) instead of operating a paver for his father's company, Civic Sand & Gravel. He began his career with the Billings Mustangs.

Coluccio took a hiatus in 1971 to get married, during which time his contract was optioned to the Philadelphia Phillies. He finished the 1971 season with the Reading Phillies. He returned to the Milwaukee Brewers system the following season.

Coluccio was invited to Major League spring training by the Brewers in 1973 following an injury to outfielder Dave May and broke camp with the team. The first MLB game which Coluccio attended was Opening Day at Milwaukee County Stadium in 1973. Coluccio became popular with Milwaukee's Italian-American population and was nicknamed the "Macaroni Pony" by Milwaukee Brewers broadcasters Bob Uecker and Merle Harmon.

Coluccio was traded from the Brewers to the White Sox for Bill Sharp on May 8, 1975. After appearing in 81 Major League games with the White Sox, he was released on April 1, 1978, six days before Opening Day. He signed with the Houston Astros five days later. After two months in the minors for the Astros, he was traded to the St. Louis Cardinals for Frank Riccelli. Coluccio would only appear in five games as a substitute for the Cardinals in the 1978 season.

After the 1978 season, Coluccio returned to Centralia to care for his father who was suffering from cancer. After his father died, he stayed home to help his family financially. He was traded to the New York Mets on October 2, 1978, for Paul Siebert but never played in the Mets organization.

Coluccio's career ended 35 games short of qualifying for a pension from Major League Baseball. However, in his retirement, Coluccio made a living as a luxury real estate specialist in Newport Beach, California, and also operated a trailer park in Centralia.
