= 1975 Baltimore Orioles season =

Major League Baseball season

1975 Baltimore Orioles
- League: American League
- Division: East
- Ballpark: Memorial Stadium
- City: Baltimore, Maryland
- Record: 90–69 (.566)
- Divisional place: 2nd
- Owners: Jerold Hoffberger
- General managers: Frank Cashen
- Managers: Earl Weaver
- Television: WJZ-TV
- Radio: WBAL (AM) (Chuck Thompson, Bill O'Donnell)

The 1975 Baltimore Orioles season concluded with the ball club finishing 4 1/2 games behind the Boston Red Sox in second place in the American League East with a 90–69 record. The team stayed in playoff contention until a doubleheader sweep by the New York Yankees at Shea Stadium on the penultimate day of the regular season on September 27. Both the Orioles and Red Sox played less than a full 162-game schedule (159 and 160 respectively) primarily due to heavy rainfall across the Eastern United States in the wake of Hurricane Eloise. The regular season would have been extended two days had the divisional title race not been decided by September 28, with the Orioles hosting the Chicago White Sox in a single night game and the Detroit Tigers in a twi-night doubleheader and the Red Sox twice playing the Yankees at Shea simultaneously. Further lack of resolution would have necessitated a one-game playoff at Memorial Stadium on October 1.

The Orioles sustained a net operating loss of $3,192.

== Offseason ==
- December 3, 1974: Enos Cabell and Rob Andrews were traded by the Orioles to the Houston Astros for Lee May and Jay Schlueter.
- December 4, 1974: Dave McNally, Rich Coggins, and Bill Kirkpatrick (minors) were traded by the Orioles to the Montreal Expos for Mike Torrez and Ken Singleton.
- December 18, 1974: Bryn Smith was signed as an amateur free agent by the Orioles.
- February 25, 1975: Boog Powell and Don Hood were traded by the Orioles to the Cleveland Indians for Dave Duncan and Al McGrew (minors).

== Regular season ==
=== Season standings ===
AL East
Team	W	L	Pct.	GB	Home	Road
Boston Red Sox	95	65	.594	—	47‍–‍34	48‍–‍31
Baltimore Orioles	90	69	.566	4½	44‍–‍33	46‍–‍36
New York Yankees	83	77	.519	12	43‍–‍35	40‍–‍42
Cleveland Indians	79	80	.497	15½	41‍–‍39	38‍–‍41
Milwaukee Brewers	68	94	.420	28	36‍–‍45	32‍–‍49
Detroit Tigers	57	102	.358	37½	31‍–‍49	26‍–‍53

=== Record vs. opponents ===
1975 American League record Sources:
Team	BAL	BOS	CAL	CWS	CLE	DET	KC	MIL	MIN	NYY	OAK	TEX
Baltimore	—	9–9	6–6	7–4	10–8	12–4	7–5	14–4	6–6	8–10	4–8	7–5
Boston	9–9	—	6–6	8–4	7–11	13–5	7–5	10–8	10–2	11–5	6–6	8–4
California	6–6	6–6	—	9–9	3–9	6–5	4–14	7–5	8–10	7–5	7–11	9–9
Chicago	4–7	4–8	9–9	—	7–5	5–7	9–9	8–4	9–9	6–6	9–9	5–13
Cleveland	8–10	11–7	9–3	5–7	—	12–6	6–6	9–9	3–6	9–9	2–10	5–7
Detroit	4–12	5–13	5–6	7–5	6–12	—	6–6	7–11	4–8	6–12	6–6	1–11
Kansas City	5–7	5–7	14–4	9–9	6–6	6–6	—	7–5	11–7	7–5	11–7	14–4
Milwaukee	4–14	8–10	5–7	4–8	9–9	11–7	5–7	—	2–10	9–9	5–7	6–6
Minnesota	6–6	2–10	10–8	9–9	6–3	8–4	7–11	10–2	—	4–8	6–12	8–10
New York	10–8	5–11	5–7	6–6	9–9	12–6	5–7	9–9	8–4	—	6–6	8–4
Oakland	8–4	6–6	11–7	9–9	10–2	6–6	11–7	7–5	12–6	6–6	—	12–6
Texas	5–7	4–8	9–9	13–5	7–5	11–1	4–14	6–6	10–8	4–8	6–12	—

=== Notable transactions ===
- June 3, 1975: 1975 Major League Baseball draft
  - Steve Lake was drafted by the Orioles in the 3rd round.
  - Darryl Cias was drafted by the Orioles in the 6th round.
- June 15, 1975: Jesse Jefferson was traded by the Orioles to the Chicago White Sox for Tony Muser.

=== Roster ===
1975 Baltimore Orioles
Roster
Pitchers: 13 Doyle Alexander; 35 Mike Cuellar; 46 Mike Flanagan; 17 Wayne Garland; 39 Ross Grimsley; 23 Grant Jackson; 38 Jesse Jefferson; 45 Dave Johnson; 37 Dyar Miller; 36 Paul Mitchell; 22 Jim Palmer; 34 Bob Reynolds; 24 Mike Torrez	Catchers: 9,44 Dave Duncan; 8 Andy Etchebarren; 10 Elrod Hendricks; 32 Jim Hutto; Infielders: 21 Bob Bailor; 7 Mark Belanger; 11 Doug DeCinces; 3 Bobby Grich; 14 Lee May; 16,34 Tony Muser; 8,43 Tim Nordbrook; 5 Brooks Robinson	Outfielders: 25 Don Baylor; 6 Paul Blair; 1 Al Bumbry; 51 Larry Harlow; 2 Jim Northrup; 28 Tom Shopay; 29 Ken Singleton; 15 Royle Stillman; Other batters: 12 Tommy Davis	Manager: 4 Earl Weaver; Coaches: 31 George Bamberger; 41 Jim Frey; 55 Billy Hunter; 48 George Staller

== Player stats ==
=== Batting ===
==== Starters by position ====
Note: Pos = Position; G = Games played; AB = At bats; H = Hits; Avg. = Batting average; HR = Home runs; RBI = Runs batted in

Pos	Player	G	AB	H	Avg.	HR	RBI
C	Dave Duncan	96	307	63	.205	12	41
1B	Lee May	146	580	152	.262	20	99
2B	Bobby Grich	150	524	136	.260	13	57
3B	Brooks Robinson	144	482	97	.201	6	53
SS	Mark Belanger	152	442	100	.226	3	27
LF	Don Baylor	145	524	148	.282	25	76
CF	Paul Blair	140	440	96	.218	5	31
RF	Ken Singleton	155	586	.176	.300	15	55
DH	Tommy Davis	116	460	130	.283	6	57

==== Other batters ====
Note: G = Games played; AB = At bats; H = Hits; Avg. = Batting average; HR = Home runs; RBI = Runs batted in

Player	G	AB	H	Avg.	HR	RBI
Al Bumbry	114	349	94	.269	2	32
Elrod Hendricks	85	223	48	.215	8	38
Jim Northrup	84	194	53	.273	5	29
Doug DeCinces	61	169	42	.251	4	23
Tony Muser	80	82	26	.317	0	11
Tim Nordbrook	40	34	4	.118	0	0
Tom Shopay	40	31	5	.161	0	2
Andy Etchebarren	8	20	4	.200	0	3
Royle Stillman	13	14	6	.429	0	1
Bob Bailor	5	7	1	.143	0	0
Jim Hutto	4	5	0	.000	0	0
Larry Harlow	4	3	1	.333	0	0

=== Pitching ===
= Indicates league leader

==== Starting pitchers ====
Note: G = Games pitched; IP = Innings pitched; W = Wins; L = Losses; ERA = Earned run average; SO = Strikeouts

Player	G	IP	W	L	ERA	SO
Jim Palmer	39	323.0	23	11	2.09	193
Mike Torrez	36	270.2	20	9	3.06	119
Mike Cuellar	36	256.0	14	12	3.66	105
Ross Grimsley	35	197.0	10	13	4.07	89

==== Other pitchers ====
Note: G = Games pitched; IP = Innings pitched; W = Wins; L = Losses; ERA = Earned run average; SO = Strikeouts

Player	G	IP	W	L	ERA	SO
Doyle Alexander	32	133.1	8	8	3.04	46
Paul Mitchell	11	57.0	3	0	3.63	31
Mike Flanagan	2	9.2	0	1	2.79	7

==== Relief pitchers ====
Note: G = Games pitched; W = Wins; L = Losses; SV = Saves; ERA = Earned run average; SO = Strikeouts

Player	G	W	L	SV	ERA	SO
Dyar Miller	30	6	3	8	2.72	33
Grant Jackson	41	4	3	7	3.35	39
Wayne Garland	29	2	5	4	3.71	46
Bob Reynolds	7	0	1	0	9.00	1
Dave Johnson	6	0	1	0	4.15	4
Jesse Jefferson	4	0	2	0	2.35	4

== Farm system ==
Level	Team	League	Manager
AAA	Rochester Red Wings	International League	Joe Altobelli
AA	Asheville Orioles	Southern League	Jimmie Schaffer
A	Lodi Orioles	California League	Bobby Malkmus
A	Miami Orioles	Florida State League	George Farson
Rookie	Bluefield Orioles	Appalachian League	Paul Flesner

== Bibliography ==
- Johnson, Lloyd; Wolff, Miles, eds. (1997). The Encyclopedia of Minor League Baseball (2nd ed.). Durham, North Carolina: Baseball America. ISBN 978-0-9637189-8-3.
