= Catfish (Bob Dylan song) =

Song by Bob Dylan

from the album The Bootleg Series Volumes 1–3 (Rare & Unreleased) 1961–1991
- Released: March 26, 1991
- Recorded: July 29, 1975
- Genre: Rock
- Length: 2:48
- Label: Columbia
- Songwriters: Bob Dylan; Jacques Levy
- Producer: Jeff Rosen

"Catfish" is a song written by Bob Dylan and Jacques Levy. It was originally recorded for Dylan's 1976 album Desire, but was not released until 1991 on The Bootleg Series Volumes 1–3 (Rare & Unreleased) 1961–1991. "Catfish" was a tribute to future Baseball Hall of Fame pitcher Catfish Hunter.

== Cover versions ==
Joe Cocker covered the song and included it on his 1976 album Stingray. Kinky Friedman released a live version on his Lasso from El Paso album. Albert Castiglia covered the song on his These Are the Days (2008) album.
