= 1975 Texas Rangers season =

1975 Texas Rangers
- League: American League
- Division: West
- Ballpark: Arlington Stadium
- City: Arlington, Texas
- Record: 79–83 (.488)
- Divisional place: 6th
- Owners: Bradford G. Corbett
- General managers: Dan O'Brien Sr.
- Managers: Billy Martin, Frank Lucchesi
- Television: KXAS-TV (Dick Risenhoover, Tom Vandergriff)
- Radio: WBAP (Dick Risenhoover, Bill Merrill)

The 1975 Texas Rangers season was the 15th of the Texas Rangers franchise overall, their 4th in Arlington as the Rangers, and the 4th season at Arlington Stadium. The Rangers finished third in the American League West with a record of 79 wins and 83 losses. The team hit a major league-leading five grand slams.

== Offseason ==
- December 5, 1974: Don Stanhouse and Pete Mackanin were traded by the Rangers to the Montreal Expos for Willie Davis.
- January 9, 1975: Bump Wills was drafted by the Rangers in the 1st round (6th pick) of the secondary phase of the 1975 Major League Baseball draft.

== Regular season ==
=== Season standings ===
AL West
Team	W	L	Pct.	GB	Home	Road
Oakland Athletics	98	64	.605	—	54‍–‍27	44‍–‍37
Kansas City Royals	91	71	.562	7	51‍–‍30	40‍–‍41
Texas Rangers	79	83	.488	19	39‍–‍41	40‍–‍42
Minnesota Twins	76	83	.478	20½	39‍–‍43	37‍–‍40
Chicago White Sox	75	86	.466	22½	42‍–‍39	33‍–‍47
California Angels	72	89	.447	25½	35‍–‍46	37‍–‍43

=== Record vs. opponents ===
1975 American League record Sources:
Team	BAL	BOS	CAL	CWS	CLE	DET	KC	MIL	MIN	NYY	OAK	TEX
Baltimore	—	9–9	6–6	7–4	10–8	12–4	7–5	14–4	6–6	8–10	4–8	7–5
Boston	9–9	—	6–6	8–4	7–11	13–5	7–5	10–8	10–2	11–5	6–6	8–4
California	6–6	6–6	—	9–9	3–9	6–5	4–14	7–5	8–10	7–5	7–11	9–9
Chicago	4–7	4–8	9–9	—	7–5	5–7	9–9	8–4	9–9	6–6	9–9	5–13
Cleveland	8–10	11–7	9–3	5–7	—	12–6	6–6	9–9	3–6	9–9	2–10	5–7
Detroit	4–12	5–13	5–6	7–5	6–12	—	6–6	7–11	4–8	6–12	6–6	1–11
Kansas City	5–7	5–7	14–4	9–9	6–6	6–6	—	7–5	11–7	7–5	11–7	14–4
Milwaukee	4–14	8–10	5–7	4–8	9–9	11–7	5–7	—	2–10	9–9	5–7	6–6
Minnesota	6–6	2–10	10–8	9–9	6–3	8–4	7–11	10–2	—	4–8	6–12	8–10
New York	10–8	5–11	5–7	6–6	9–9	12–6	5–7	9–9	8–4	—	6–6	8–4
Oakland	8–4	6–6	11–7	9–9	10–2	6–6	11–7	7–5	12–6	6–6	—	12–6
Texas	5–7	4–8	9–9	13–5	7–5	11–1	4–14	6–6	10–8	4–8	6–12	—

=== Notable transactions ===
- June 4, 1975: Willie Davis was traded by the Rangers to the St. Louis Cardinals for Ed Brinkman and Tommy Moore.
- June 13, 1975: Jim Bibby, Jackie Brown, Rick Waits, and $100,000 were traded by the Rangers to the Cleveland Indians for Gaylord Perry.
- June 13, 1975: Ed Brinkman was purchased from the Rangers by the New York Yankees.

=== Roster ===
1975 Texas Rangers
Roster
Pitchers: 34 Mike Bacsik; 22 Jim Bibby; 28 Jackie Brown; 32 David Clyde; 29 Steve Foucault; 39 Jim Gideon; 49 Bill Hands; 26 Steve Hargan; 31 Ferguson Jenkins; 18 Mike Kekich; 16 Jim Merritt; 28 Tommy Moore; 36 Gaylord Perry; 18 Stan Perzanowski; 23 Stan Thomas; 40 Jim Umbarger; 25,38 Clyde Wright	Catchers: 14 Bill Fahey; 35 Ron Pruitt; 10 Jim Sundberg; Infielders: 3 Ed Brinkman; 19 Leo Cárdenas; 4 Mike Cubbage; 17 Jim Fregosi; 11 Toby Harrah; 13,27 Roy Howell; 5 Dave Nelson; 7,33 Lenny Randle; 25 Tom Robson; 15 Roy Smalley; 3,9 Jim Spencer	Outfielders: 20 Jeff Burroughs; 3 Willie Davis; 6 Tom Grieve; 21 Mike Hargrove; 8 Bobby Jones; 2 Joe Lovitto; 30 Dave Moates; 12 César Tovar	Manager: 44 Frank Lucchesi; 1 Billy Martin; Coaches: 45 Merl Combs; 41 Art Fowler; 47 Dick Gernert; 54 Sid Hudson; 44 Frank Lucchesi; 42 Jackie Moore; 43 Charlie Silvera

== Player stats ==
=== Batting ===
==== Starters by position ====
Note: Pos = Position; G = Games played; AB = At bats; H = Hits; Avg. = Batting average; HR = Home runs; RBI = Runs batted in

Pos	Player	G	AB	H	Avg.	HR	RBI
C	Jim Sundberg	155	472	94	.199	6	36
1B	Jim Spencer	132	403	107	.266	11	47
2B	Lenny Randle	156	601	166	.276	4	57
SS	Toby Harrah	151	522	153	.293	20	93
3B	Roy Howell	125	383	96	.251	10	51
LF	Mike Hargrove	145	519	157	.303	11	62
CF	Dave Moates	54	175	48	.274	3	14
RF	Jeff Burroughs	152	585	132	.226	29	94
DH	César Tovar	102	427	110	.258	3	28

==== Other batters ====
Note: G = Games played; AB = At bats; H = Hits; Avg. = Batting average; HR = Home runs; RBI = Runs batted in

Player	G	AB	H	Avg.	HR	RBI
Tom Grieve	118	369	102	.276	14	61
Roy Smalley	78	250	57	.228	3	33
Jim Fregosi	77	191	50	.262	7	33
Willie Davis	42	169	42	.249	5	17
Mike Cubbage	58	143	32	.224	4	21
Joe Lovitto	50	106	22	.208	1	8
Leo Cárdenas	55	102	24	.235	1	5
Dave Nelson	28	80	17	.213	2	10
Bill Fahey	21	37	11	.297	0	3
Tom Robson	17	35	7	.200	0	2
Ron Pruitt	14	17	3	.176	0	0
Bobby Jones	9	11	1	.091	0	0
Ed Brinkman	1	2	0	.000	0	0

=== Pitching ===
==== Starting pitchers ====
Note: G = Games pitched; IP = Innings pitched; W = Wins; L = Losses; ERA = Earned run average; SO = Strikeouts

Player	G	IP	W	L	ERA	SO
Ferguson Jenkins	37	270.0	17	18	3.93	157
Steve Hargan	33	189.1	9	10	3.80	93
Gaylord Perry	22	184.0	12	8	3.03	148
Bill Hands	18	109.2	6	7	4.02	67
Jim Bibby	12	68.1	2	6	5.00	31
Stan Perzanowski	12	66.0	3	3	3.00	26
David Clyde	1	7.0	0	1	2.57	2
Jim Gideon	1	5.2	0	0	7.94	2

==== Other pitchers ====
Note: G = Games pitched; IP = Innings pitched; W = Wins; L = Losses; ERA = Earned run average; SO = Strikeouts

Player	G	IP	W	L	ERA	SO
Jim Umbarger	56	131.0	8	7	4.12	50
Clyde Wright	25	93.1	4	6	4.44	32
Jackie Brown	17	70.1	5	5	4.22	35
Mike Bacsik	7	26.2	1	2	3.71	13

==== Relief pitchers ====
Note: G = Games pitched; W = Wins; L = Losses; SV = Saves; ERA = Earned run average; SO = Strikeouts

Player	G	W	L	SV	ERA	SO
Steve Foucault	59	8	4	10	4.12	56
Stan Thomas	46	4	4	3	3.10	46
Mike Kekich	23	0	0	2	3.73	19
Tommy Moore	12	0	2	0	8.14	15
Jim Merritt	5	0	0	0	0.00	0

== Farm system ==
Level	Team	League	Manager
AAA	Spokane Indians	Pacific Coast League	Del Wilber
AA	Pittsfield Rangers	Eastern League	Jackie Moore and Marty Martínez
A	Lynchburg Rangers	Carolina League	Wayne Terwilliger
A	Anderson Rangers	Western Carolinas League	Rich Donnelly
Rookie	GCL Rangers	Gulf Coast League	Joe Klein

LEAGUE CHAMPIONS: GCL Rangers
