= Rich Coggins =

American baseball player (born 1950)

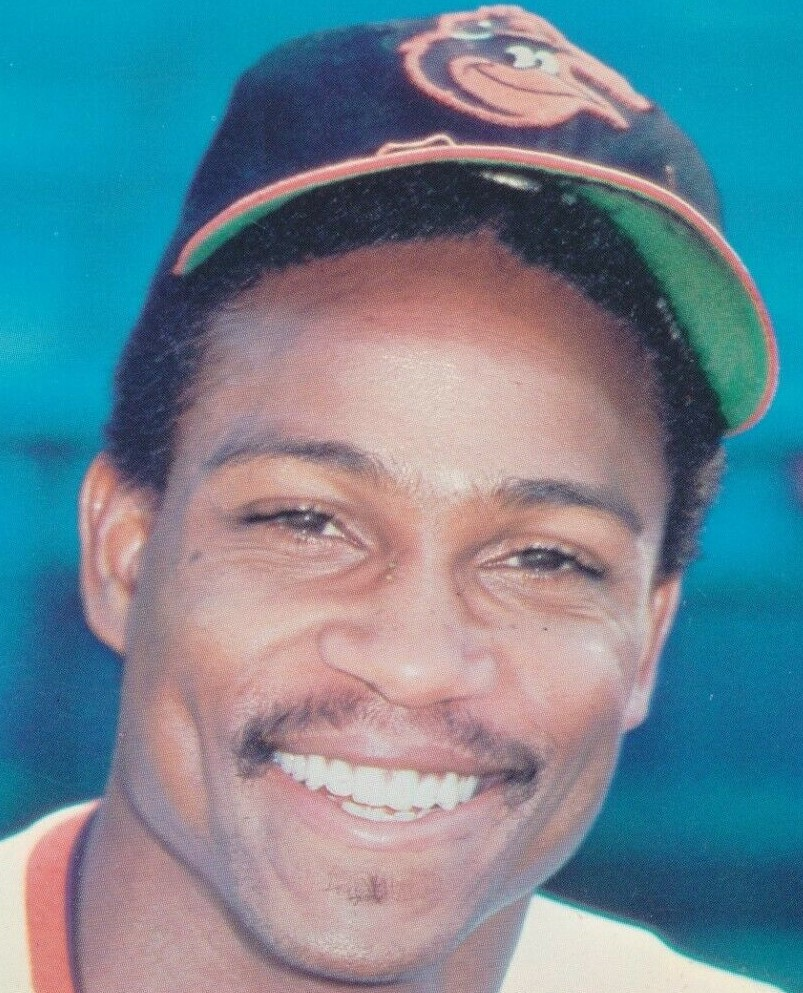
- Outfielder
- Born: December 7, 1950 (age 75); Indianapolis, Indiana, U.S.
- Batted: Left Threw: Left

MLB debut
- August 29, 1972, for the Baltimore Orioles

Last MLB appearance
- July 7, 1976, for the Chicago White Sox

MLB statistics
- Batting average: .265
- Home runs: 12
- Runs batted in: 90
- Stats at Baseball Reference

Teams
- Baltimore Orioles (1972–1974); Montreal Expos (1975); New York Yankees (1975–1976); Chicago White Sox (1976)

Richard Allen Coggins (born December 7, 1950) is an American former outfielder for the Baltimore Orioles (1972-1974), Montreal Expos (1975), New York Yankees (1975-1976) and Chicago White Sox (1976).

Coggins helped the Orioles win the 1973 and 1974 American League Eastern Division . He finished sixth in voting for 1973 American League Rookie of the Year. He was traded along with Dave McNally and minor-league right-handed pitcher Bill Kirkpatrick from the Orioles to the Expos for Ken Singleton and Mike Torrez at the Winter Meetings on December 4, 1974.

In five seasons he played in 342 games and had 1,083 at bats, 125 runs, 287 hits, 42 doubles, 13 triples, 12 home runs, 90 RBI, 50 stolen bases, 72 walks, .265 batting average, .312 on-base percentage, .361 slugging percentage, 391 total bases, 26 sacrifice hits, 5 sacrifice flies and 5 intentional walks. Defensively, he compiled a .986 fielding percentage at all three outfield positions.
