= Charlie Chant =

American baseball player (born 1951)

- Outfielder
- Born: August 7, 1951 (age 74); Bell, California, U.S.
- Batted: Right Threw: Right

MLB debut
- September 12, 1975, for the Oakland Athletics

Last MLB appearance
- October 3, 1976, for the St. Louis Cardinals

MLB statistics
- Batting average: .105
- Home runs: 0
- Runs batted in: 0
- Stats at Baseball Reference

Teams
- Oakland Athletics (1975); St. Louis Cardinals (1976)

Charles Joseph Chant (born August 7, 1951) is an American former Major League Baseball outfielder. He played for the Oakland Athletics during the 1975 season and the St. Louis Cardinals during the 1976 season.
