= Mike Poepping =

American baseball player (born 1950)

- Outfielder
- Born: August 7, 1950 (age 75); Little Falls, Minnesota, U.S.
- Batted: Right Threw: Right

MLB debut
- September 6, 1975, for the Minnesota Twins

Last MLB appearance
- September 28, 1975, for the Minnesota Twins

MLB statistics
- Games played: 14
- Batting average: .135
- Runs batted in: 1
- Stats at Baseball Reference

Teams
- Minnesota Twins (1975)

Michael Harold Poepping (born August 7, 1950) is an American former outfielder in Major League Baseball. He played for the Minnesota Twins.
