= Catfish Hunter =

American baseball player (1946–1999)

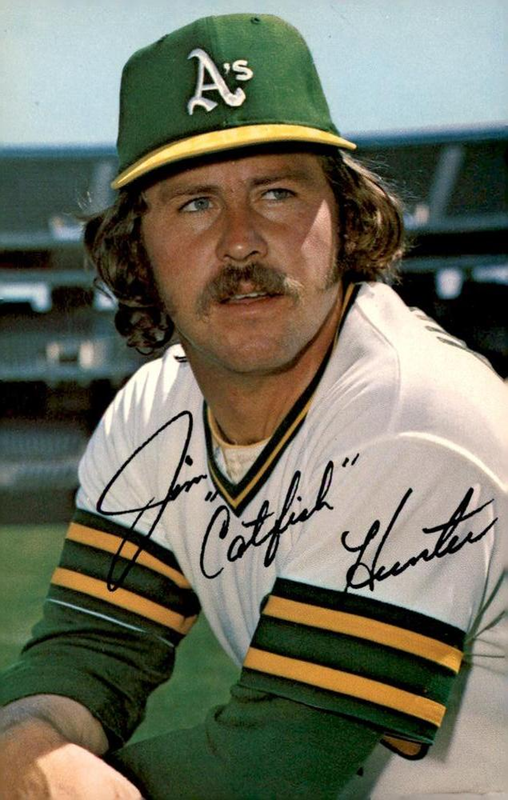
- Hunter with the Oakland Athletics, c. 1973
- Pitcher
- Born: April 8, 1946; Hertford, North Carolina, U.S.
- Died: September 9, 1999 (aged 53); Hertford, North Carolina, U.S.
- Batted: Right Threw: Right

MLB debut
- May 13, 1965, for the Kansas City Athletics

Last MLB appearance
- September 17, 1979, for the New York Yankees

MLB statistics
- Win–loss record: 224–166
- Earned run average: 3.26
- Strikeouts: 2,012
- Stats at Baseball Reference

Teams
- Kansas City / Oakland Athletics (1965–1974); New York Yankees (1975–1979)

Career highlights and awards
- 8× All-Star (1966, 1967, 1970, 1972–1976); 5× World Series champion (1972–1974, 1977, 1978); AL Cy Young Award (1974); 2× MLB wins leader (1974, 1975); AL ERA leader (1974); Pitched a perfect game on May 8, 1968; Athletics No. 27 retired; Athletics Hall of Fame

Member of the National

Baseball Hall of Fame
- Induction: 1987
- Vote: 76.3% (third ballot)

James Augustus "Catfish" Hunter (April 8, 1946 – September 9, 1999) was an American professional baseball player in Major League Baseball (MLB). From 1965 to 1979, he was a pitcher for the Kansas City / Oakland Athletics and New York Yankees. Hunter is the only pitcher since 1915 to win 200 games by age 31. He is often referred to as baseball's first big-money free agent, and was a member of five World Series championship teams.

Hunter was married to Helen Hunter and they had three children. Hunter retired at age 33 following the 1979 season, after developing persistent arm problems, and was inducted into the Baseball Hall of Fame in 1987. He was diagnosed with amyotrophic lateral sclerosis, also known as Lou Gehrig's disease, in his early 50s, and died of the disease about a year after his diagnosis. Hunter has been the subject of numerous popular culture references, including the Bob Dylan song "Catfish".

== Early life ==
The youngest son of eight children, Hunter was born and raised in Hertford in northeast North Carolina. He grew up on a farm and excelled in a variety of sports at Perquimans County High School. Hunter played linebacker and offensive tackle in football as well as shortstop, cleanup batter, and pitcher in baseball. His older brothers taught him to pitch, and his pitching skill began to attract scouts from major-league teams to Hertford. He led the Perquimans baseball team to the 1963 NCHSAA 2A state title his junior season.

During his senior year in November 1963, Hunter's right foot was wounded by a brother in a hunting accident; he lost one of his toes and shotgun pellets lodged in his foot. The accident left Hunter somewhat hobbled and jeopardized his prospects in the eyes of many professional scouts, but the Kansas City Athletics signed Hunter to a contract. Hunter was sent to the Mayo Clinic that year so that surgeons could work on his foot. He recovered in La Porte, Indiana, at the farm of Athletics owner Charles O. Finley.

== Professional career ==
=== Kansas City / Oakland Athletics ===
Hunter signed with the A's on June 8, 1964, for a reported $75,000, but did not play professionally during the 1964 regular season due to foot surgery and the subsequent recovery from his hunting accident the previous fall. He made his professional baseball debut in the Florida Instructional League in the fall of 1964.

It is commonly cited that Finley gave Hunter the nickname "Catfish" in 1965 because he thought his 19-year-old pitcher needed a flashy nickname. A story circulated that his family gave him the nickname as a child when he went missing and was later found with a string of catfish; there is no truth to that explanation. However, news articles published mere days after his signing in 1964 reference the nickname (as well as that of John "Blue Moon" Odom, who signed at the same time).

Aside from the fall stint in the instructional league, Hunter never played in the minor leagues. He made his major league debut in May, 1965 and earned his first win on July 27 in Fenway Park over the Boston Red Sox. In 1966 and 1967, he was named to the American League All-Star team.

Prior to the 1968 season, Finley moved the A's from Kansas City to Oakland.

On Wednesday, May 8, against the Minnesota Twins, Hunter pitched the ninth perfect game in baseball history. It was the first regular season perfect game in 46 years in the American League since Charlie Robertson's perfect game in 1922, (excluding Don Larsen's perfect game in the 1956 World Series). The game also marked the first no-hitter by an Athletics pitcher since Bill McCahan in 1947 with what were then the Philadelphia Athletics. The game was scoreless until the bottom of the seventh inning; offensively, Hunter got three hits and drove in three of Oakland's four runs with a squeeze bunt in the seventh and a bases-loaded single in the eighth. Hunter disagreed with only two of catcher Jim Pagliaroni's pitch-calling decisions during the game, and as a token of his appreciation for his catcher's contributions, rewarded Pagliaroni with a gold watch that he had inscribed on back.

Hunter continued to win games, and in 1974 received both The Sporting News's "Pitcher of the Year" award and the American League Cy Young Award after going 25–12 with a league-leading 2.49 earned run average. The A's also won their third consecutive World Series. Hunter's statistics while he was with the Athletics were impressive: four consecutive years with at least 20 wins, and three World Series championships without a loss. He had won 161 games for the A's, 131 in seven seasons in Oakland and 30 in his first three seasons in Kansas City.

=== Free agency ===
On February 11, 1974, Hunter agreed with the A's on a two-year, $200,000 contract with a clause stipulating that $50,000 payments be made to a life insurance annuity of his choosing in each of the two seasons. After Finley refused to make payment on the annuity after discovering he had to pay $25,000 in taxes which was due immediately, the breach of contract dispute was brought before an arbitration hearing on November 26, 1974. Twenty days later on December 16, arbitrator Peter Seitz decided in favor of Hunter, officially making him a free agent. Hunter recalled being scared after he was declared a free agent. "We don't belong to anybody", he told his wife.

=== New York Yankees ===
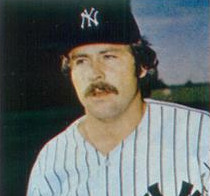
Hunter with the Yankees

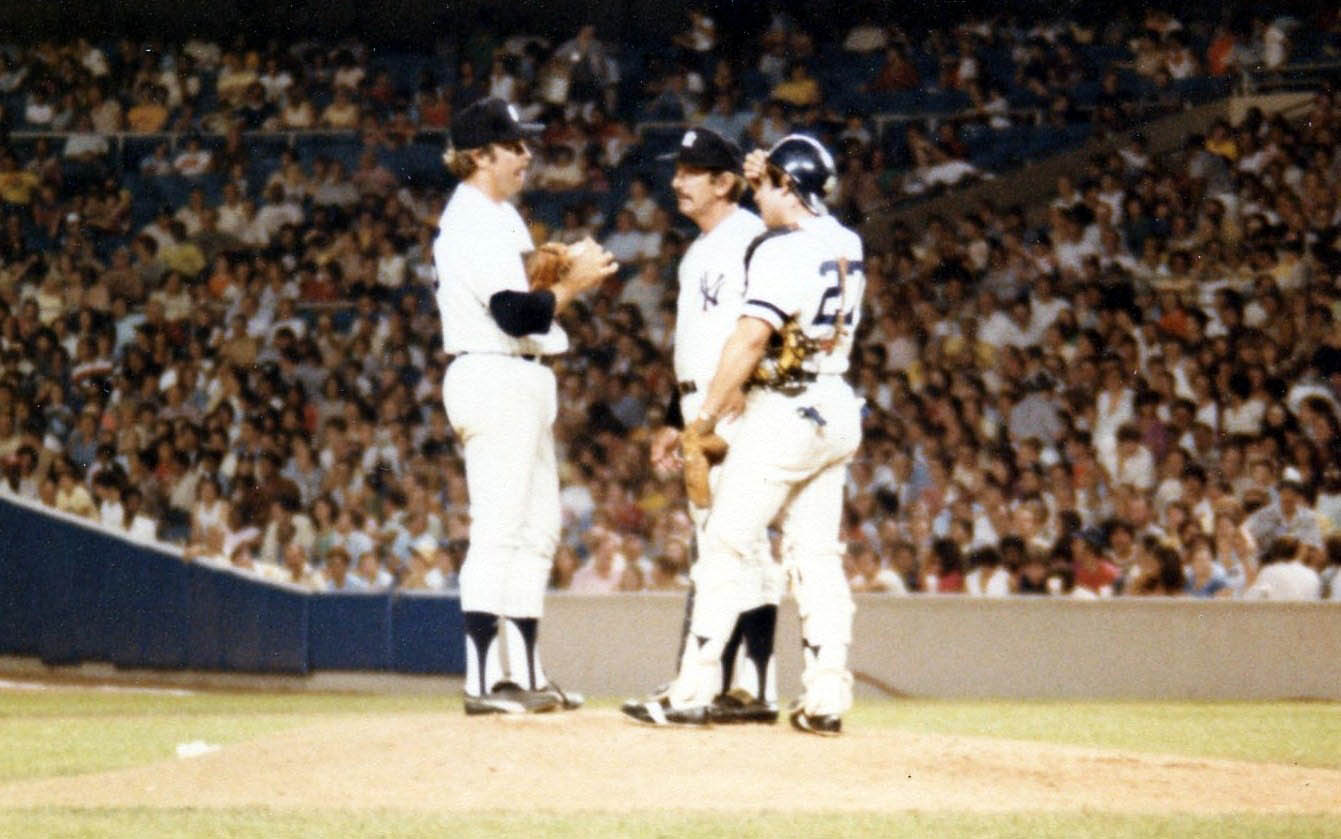
Hunter (left) with manager Billy Martin and Brad Gulden shortly after Thurman Munson's death in 1979.

Two weeks after he won his arbitration, Hunter became the highest-paid player in baseball and highest-paid pitcher in history when he signed a five-year contract with the New York Yankees worth $3.35 million. He had been courted by 23 of the 24 teams, including the A's but not the San Francisco Giants, and refused higher offers from the San Diego Padres and the Kansas City Royals. New York was closer to his home in North Carolina and the team played on natural grass.

Finley attempted to have the arbitration ruling overturned, but was unsuccessful after several appeals. Further details of Finley's history with Hunter gave the A's owner added negative publicity. Hunter became known as baseball's "first big-money free agent".

Hunter got off to a rough start going 0–3 in his first three starts, but settled down and was named to his seventh All-Star team. He led the league in wins (23) for the second year in a row, and also led the league in innings pitched (328) and complete games (30) to finish second to Jim Palmer of the Baltimore Orioles in the American League Cy Young balloting. Hunter was the last major league pitcher to throw 30 complete games in a season. He also became only the fourth (and last) American League pitcher to win 20 games in a season for five consecutive seasons (1971–1975). The others were Walter Johnson (10), Lefty Grove (7), and Bob Feller (5).

In 1976, Hunter won 17 games, led the Yankees in complete games and innings pitched, and was again named to the All-Star team. The Yankees won three straight pennants with Hunter from 1976 to 1978. In 1976, Hunter became the fourth major league pitcher to win 200 games before the age of 31 and the only one since Walter Johnson in 1915, preceded by Cy Young and Christy Mathewson. Hunter was also a competent hitter, with a career batting average of .226; in 1971 he hit .350 with 36 hits in 38 games. After the designated hitter was adopted by the American League in 1973, Hunter had only two plate appearances in his final seven seasons, with one base hit in 1973.

Hunter won his Opening Day start in 1977, limiting the Milwaukee Brewers to three hits over seven shutout innings in a 3–0 victory on April 7. He left the game with a bruised foot and was eventually placed on the 21-day disabled list with the injury, not pitching again until May 5.

Arm injuries plagued Hunter beginning in 1978. In spring training, he was diagnosed with diabetes and combined with his chronic arm trouble the disease began to sap Hunter's energy. Following the 1979 season and the end of his five-year contract, Hunter retired from baseball at age 33. Hunter won 63 games in his five seasons with the Yankees. He retired with appearances in six World Series and with five World Series championships.

While with the Yankees, Hunter was a resident of Norwood, New Jersey, preferring to live outside of New York City.

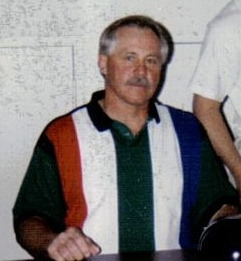
Hunter following his playing career

== Later life ==
He returned to his farm in Hertford where he grew soybeans, corn, peanuts, and cotton, and was a spokesman for diabetes awareness. Hunter noticed arm weakness while hunting in the winter of 1997–1998. He was diagnosed with amyotrophic lateral sclerosis (ALS), or Lou Gehrig's disease. When ESPN SportsCentury did their Fifty Greatest Athletes of the 20th Century in 1999, Hunter talked about ALS during Lou Gehrig's episode in May of that year. It would be one of Hunter's last interviews.

Hunter died at his home in Hertford on September 9, 1999, at age 53, a year after his ALS diagnosis. A month before his death, on August 8, Hunter fell and hit his head on concrete steps at home. He was unconscious for several days after the fall, but he had returned home from that hospitalization when he died. Hunter is interred at Cedarwood Cemetery in Hertford, adjacent to the field where he played high school baseball.

== Legacy ==
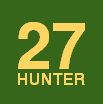
Hunter's number 27 was retired by the Oakland Athletics in 1991.

=== Honors ===
Along with Billy Williams and Ray Dandridge, Hunter was inducted into the Baseball Hall of Fame in Cooperstown in 1987. At the time, Hall of Fame officials would always defer to the player's wishes in determining which team would be memorialized on his Hall of Fame plaque. Before and after his induction, Hunter spoke highly of his experiences with both the Athletics and Yankees and his appreciation for both team owners, Charlie Finley and George Steinbrenner. For this reason, he declined to choose a team; accordingly, his plaque depicts him with no logo on his cap. He was credited by Steinbrenner as the cornerstone of the Yankees in their return to championship form.

In 1990, Hunter was inducted into the Bay Area Sports Hall of Fame. In 2004, the Oakland Athletics began the Catfish Hunter Award. His number 27 was retired by the Oakland Athletics in a pre-game ceremony on June 9, 1991, the first in the franchise's 90-year history.

The Jim "Catfish" Hunter Memorial is located in Hertford. An annual softball event is held in Hertford in memory of Hunter. All proceeds from the weekend benefit ALS research. The tournament has raised over $200,000 since 1999.

On September 5, 2018, Hunter was inducted into the Oakland Athletics first Hall of Fame class, with his widow, Helen, in attendance to receive the posthumous honor.

=== Reception ===
After Hunter's death, former teammate Reggie Jackson described Hunter as a "fabulous human being. He was a man of honor. He was a man of loyalty." Steinbrenner said, "We were not winning before Catfish arrived... He exemplified class and dignity and he taught us how to win." Former teammate Lou Piniella said, "Catfish was a very unique guy. If you didn't know he was making that kind of money, you'd never guess it because he was humble, very reserved about being a star-type player... almost a little bit shy. But he told great stories. He had a heck of a sense of humor. When you play with guys like that, you feel blessed."

=== Popular culture ===
Hunter has been the subject of multiple popular culture references. Bob Dylan wrote the song "Catfish" in 1975. The song was later released by Dylan, Joe Cocker, and Kinky Friedman. In 1976, Hunter was also the subject of the Bobby Hollowell song "The Catfish Kid (Ballad of Jim Hunter)", which was performed by Big Tom White.

Minor league pitcher Jason Kosow portrayed Hunter in the ESPN miniseries The Bronx is Burning, which depicted the 1977 New York Yankees.

== Career statistics ==
Category	W	L	Pct	ERA	G	GS	CG	SHO	SV	IP	H	ER	R	HR	BB	K	WP	HBP
Total	224	166	.574	3.26	500	476	181	42	0	3,449 1/3	2,958	1,248	1,380	374	954	2,012	49	49

== See also ==
- List of Major League Baseball annual ERA leaders
- List of Major League Baseball annual wins leaders
- List of Major League Baseball career strikeout leaders
- List of Major League Baseball career shutout leaders
- List of Major League Baseball career wins leaders
- List of baseball players who went directly to Major League Baseball

Achievements
Preceded by Sandy Koufax	Perfect game pitcher May 8, 1968	Succeeded by Len Barker
Preceded by Tom Phoebus	No-hitter pitcher May 8, 1968	Succeeded by George Culver
