= 1975 Major League Baseball season =

1975 MLB season
- League: American League (AL); National League (NL)
- Sport: Baseball
- Duration: Regular season: April 7 – September 28, 1975; Postseason: October 4–22, 1975
- Games: 162
- Teams: 24 (12 per league)
- TV partner: NBC

Draft
- Top draft pick: Danny Goodwin
- Picked by: California Angels

Regular season
- Season MVP: AL: Fred Lynn (BOS); NL: Joe Morgan (CIN)

Postseason
- AL champions: Boston Red Sox
- AL runners-up: Oakland Athletics
- NL champions: Cincinnati Reds
- NL runners-up: Pittsburgh Pirates

World Series
- Champions: Cincinnati Reds
- Runners-up: Boston Red Sox
- World Series MVP: Pete Rose (CIN)

MLB seasons
- ← 1974 1976 →

Locations of teams for the 1974–1975 American League seasons
West East
Locations of teams for the 1971–1976 National League seasons
West East

The 1975 major league baseball season began on April 7 while the regular season ended on September 28. The postseason began on October 4. The 72nd World Series then began on October 11 and concluded on October 22 with the Cincinnati Reds of the National League defeating the Boston Red Sox of the American League, four games to three, to win their third title in franchise history, since their previous in 1940. Going into the season, the defending three-time World Series champions were the Oakland Athletics from the 1972 to 1974 seasons.

The 46th All-Star Game was held on July 15 at Milwaukee County Stadium in Milwaukee, Wisconsin, home of the Milwaukee Brewers. The National League won, 6–3, and was the fourth win in what would be an 11-game win streak that lasted until 1983.

Frank Robinson become the first Major League black manager in post-integration baseball, managing the Cleveland Indians.

At the All-Star Break, there were discussions of Bowie Kuhn's reappointment. Charlie Finley, New York owner George Steinbrenner and Baltimore owner Jerry Hoffberger were part of a group that wanted him gone. Finley was trying to convince the new owner of the Texas Rangers Brad Corbett that MLB needed a more dynamic commissioner. During the vote, Baltimore and New York decided to vote in favor of the commissioner's reappointment. In addition, there were discussions of expansion for 1977, with Seattle and Washington, D.C. as the proposed cities for expansion.

== Schedule ==
The 1975 schedule consisted of 162 games for all teams in the American League and National League, each of which had 12 teams. Each league was split into two six-team divisions. Each team was scheduled to play 18 games against their five division rivals, totaling 90 games, and 12 games against six interdivision opponents, totaling 72 games. This continued the format put in place since the 1969 and would be used until 1977 in the American League and 1993 in the National League.

Opening Day took place on April 7, featuring eight teams. The final day of the regular season was on September 28, featuring all 24 teams. The League Championship Series for both leagues began on October 4 and ended on October 7. The World Series took place between October 11 and October 22.

== Rule changes ==
The 1975 season saw the following rule changes:

- In the manufacturing of baseballs, cowhide is now permitted to be used in place of horsehide, due to a shortage of horses.
- Rules for baseball bats were adjusted:
  - Cupped bats, bats with an indentation at the end of the bat, are now allowed.
  - A batter will be suspended by the League President for three days if a batter hits using a filled, doctored, or flat-surfaced bat, and will be ejected immediately.
- Rules regarding suspended games on account of darkness were expanded to any day of the week, not just the second game of a Sunday doubleheader.
- Due to a loophole in which an outfielder could intentionally drop a fly ball to cause a dead ball (meaning baserunners couldn't advance as the play was dead), rules regarding dropping fly balls intentionally were changed from "fielder" to "infielder".
- Rules regarding balls going out of play were clarified:
  - If a ball goes out of play due to a pitch, runners can advance one base.
  - If, subsequently, a wild pitch or errant pickoff throw is deflected or kicked out of play, runners can advance two bases.
- Any pitcher found to have on his person or in his possession a foreign substance on will be immediately ejected.
- Rules regarding sacrifice flys were clarified. Previously, a sacrifice fly could only be credited if an outfielder handled the ball. Now, it includes infielders handling the ball in the outfield.
- The save rules were amended so that only one relief pitcher must meet three conditions to be credited with a save:
  1. Is the finishing pitcher by the winning team.
  2. Is not the winning pitcher.
  3. Meets one of the following conditions:
    - Enters a game where the winning team has three or less runs and pitches one inning.
    - Enters a game with the potential tying run on base, at bat, or on deck.
    - Pitches for at least three innings.

== Teams ==
League	Division	Team	City	Ballpark	Capacity	Manager
American League	East	Baltimore Orioles	Baltimore, Maryland	Baltimore Memorial Stadium	53,208	Earl Weaver
American League	East	Boston Red Sox	Boston, Massachusetts	Fenway Park	33,368	Darrell Johnson
American League	East	Cleveland Indians	Cleveland, Ohio	Cleveland Stadium	74,483	Frank Robinson
American League	East	Detroit Tigers	Detroit, Michigan	Tiger Stadium	52,806	Ralph Houk
American League	East	Milwaukee Brewers	Milwaukee, Wisconsin	Milwaukee County Stadium	53,192	Del Crandall
American League	East	Milwaukee Brewers	Milwaukee, Wisconsin	Milwaukee County Stadium	53,192	Harvey Kuenn
American League	East	New York Yankees	New York, New York	Shea Stadium	55,601	Bill Virdon
American League	East	New York Yankees	New York, New York	Shea Stadium	55,601	Billy Martin
American League	West	California Angels	Anaheim, California	Anaheim Stadium	43,500	Dick Williams
American League	West	Chicago White Sox	Chicago, Illinois	White Sox Park	44,492	Chuck Tanner
American League	West	Kansas City Royals	Kansas City, Missouri	Royals Stadium	40,613	Jack McKeon
American League	West	Kansas City Royals	Kansas City, Missouri	Royals Stadium	40,613	Whitey Herzog
American League	West	Minnesota Twins	Bloomington, Minnesota	Metropolitan Stadium	45,919	Frank Quilici
American League	West	Oakland Athletics	Oakland, California	Oakland–Alameda County Coliseum	50,000	Alvin Dark
American League	West	Texas Rangers	Arlington, Texas	Arlington Stadium	35,649	Billy Martin
National League	East	Chicago Cubs	Chicago, Illinois	Wrigley Field	37,702	Jim Marshall
National League	East	Montreal Expos	Montreal, Quebec	Jarry Park Stadium	29,125	Gene Mauch
National League	East	New York Mets	New York, New York	Shea Stadium	55,601	Yogi Berra
National League	East	Philadelphia Phillies	Philadelphia, Pennsylvania	Veterans Stadium	62,382	Danny Ozark
National League	East	Pittsburgh Pirates	Pittsburgh, Pennsylvania	Three Rivers Stadium	58,722	Danny Murtaugh
National League	East	St. Louis Cardinals	St. Louis, Missouri	Civic Center Busch Memorial Stadium	53,138	Red Schoendienst
National League	West	Atlanta Braves	Atlanta, Georgia	Atlanta Stadium	52,870	Clyde King
National League	West	Atlanta Braves	Atlanta, Georgia	Atlanta Stadium	52,870	Connie Ryan
National League	West	Cincinnati Reds	Cincinnati, Ohio	Riverfront Stadium	52,953	Sparky Anderson
National League	West	Houston Astros	Houston, Texas	Houston Astrodome	47,000	Preston Gómez
National League	West	Los Angeles Dodgers	Los Angeles, California	Dodger Stadium	56,000	Walter Alston
National League	West	San Diego Padres	San Diego, California	San Diego Stadium	50,000	John McNamara
National League	West	San Francisco Giants	San Francisco, California	Candlestick Park	58,945	Wes Westrum

== Standings ==
=== American League ===
AL East
Team	W	L	Pct.	GB	Home	Road
Boston Red Sox	95	65	.594	—	47‍–‍34	48‍–‍31
Baltimore Orioles	90	69	.566	4½	44‍–‍33	46‍–‍36
New York Yankees	83	77	.519	12	43‍–‍35	40‍–‍42
Cleveland Indians	79	80	.497	15½	41‍–‍39	38‍–‍41
Milwaukee Brewers	68	94	.420	28	36‍–‍45	32‍–‍49
Detroit Tigers	57	102	.358	37½	31‍–‍49	26‍–‍53

AL West
Team	W	L	Pct.	GB	Home	Road
Oakland Athletics	98	64	.605	—	54‍–‍27	44‍–‍37
Kansas City Royals	91	71	.562	7	51‍–‍30	40‍–‍41
Texas Rangers	79	83	.488	19	39‍–‍41	40‍–‍42
Minnesota Twins	76	83	.478	20½	39‍–‍43	37‍–‍40
Chicago White Sox	75	86	.466	22½	42‍–‍39	33‍–‍47
California Angels	72	89	.447	25½	35‍–‍46	37‍–‍43

=== National League ===
NL East
Team	W	L	Pct.	GB	Home	Road
Pittsburgh Pirates	92	69	.571	—	52‍–‍28	40‍–‍41
Philadelphia Phillies	86	76	.531	6½	51‍–‍30	35‍–‍46
New York Mets	82	80	.506	10½	42‍–‍39	40‍–‍41
St. Louis Cardinals	82	80	.506	10½	45‍–‍36	37‍–‍44
Chicago Cubs	75	87	.463	17½	42‍–‍39	33‍–‍48
Montreal Expos	75	87	.463	17½	39‍–‍42	36‍–‍45

NL West
Team	W	L	Pct.	GB	Home	Road
Cincinnati Reds	108	54	.667	—	64‍–‍17	44‍–‍37
Los Angeles Dodgers	88	74	.543	20	49‍–‍32	39‍–‍42
San Francisco Giants	80	81	.497	27½	46‍–‍35	34‍–‍46
San Diego Padres	71	91	.438	37	38‍–‍43	33‍–‍48
Atlanta Braves	67	94	.416	40½	37‍–‍43	30‍–‍51
Houston Astros	64	97	.398	43½	37‍–‍44	27‍–‍53

=== Tie game ===
1 tie game (0 in AL, 1 in NL), which is not factored into winning percentage or games behind (and was replayed again) occurred during the season.

==== National League ====
- August 25, St. Louis Cardinals vs. Houston Astros, tied at 3 after 10 innings. The game made it to two outs in the bottom of the 11th, with the Astros up 4–3. However, what followed was a thunderstorm which caused a two hour and 19 minute rain delay. The game was called on account of rain, and the game reverted to a 3–3 tie as it was after 10 innings.

== Postseason ==
The postseason began on October 11 and ended on October 22 with the Cincinnati Reds defeating the Boston Red Sox in the 1975 World Series in seven games.

=== Bracket ===
League Championship Series (ALCS, NLCS)
East	Boston	3
West	Oakland	0
East	Pittsburgh	0
West	Cincinnati	3

World Series
AL	Boston	3
NL	Cincinnati	4

== Managerial changes ==
=== Off-season ===
Team	Former Manager	New Manager
Cleveland Indians	Ken Aspromonte	Frank Robinson

=== In-season ===
Team	Former Manager	New Manager
Atlanta Braves	Clyde King	Connie Ryan
Kansas City Royals	Jack McKeon	Whitey Herzog
Milwaukee Brewers	Del Crandall	Harvey Kuenn
New York Yankees	Bill Virdon	Billy Martin
Texas Rangers	Billy Martin	Frank Lucchesi

== League leaders ==
=== American League ===
Hitting leaders
Stat	Player	Total
AVG	Rod Carew (MIN)	.359
OPS	Fred Lynn (BOS)	.967
HR	Reggie Jackson (OAK); George Scott (MIL)	36
RBI	George Scott (MIL)	109
R	Fred Lynn (BOS)	103
H	George Brett (KC)	195
SB	Mickey Rivers (CAL)	70

Pitching leaders
Stat	Player	Total
W	Catfish Hunter (NYY); Jim Palmer (BAL)	23
L	Wilbur Wood (CWS)	20
ERA	Jim Palmer (BAL)	2.09
K	Frank Tanana (CAL)	269
IP	Catfish Hunter (NYY)	328.0
SV	Goose Gossage (CWS)	26
WHIP	Catfish Hunter (NYY)	1.009

=== National League ===
Hitting leaders
Stat	Player	Total
AVG	Bill Madlock (CHC)	.354
OPS	Joe Morgan (CIN)	.974
HR	Mike Schmidt (PHI)	38
RBI	Greg Luzinski (PHI)	120
R	Pete Rose (CIN)	112
H	Dave Cash (PHI)	213
SB	Davey Lopes (LAD)	77

Pitching leaders
Stat	Player	Total
W	Tom Seaver (NYM)	22
L	Rick Reuschel (CHC)	22
ERA	Randy Jones (SD)	2.24
K	Tom Seaver (NYM)	243
IP	Andy Messersmith (LAD)	321.2
SV	Rawly Eastwick (CIN); Al Hrabosky (STL)	22
WHIP	Don Sutton (LAD)	1.038

== Milestones ==
=== Batters ===
==== Cycles ====
- Lou Brock (STL):
  - Brock hit for his first cycle and 15th in franchise history, on May 27 against the San Diego Padres.

==== Other batting accomplishments ====
- Willie McCovey (SD):
  - Tied a Major League record by becoming the third player to hit three career grand slams as a pinch-hitter on May 30 in a 6–2 victory over the New York Mets.
- Billy Williams (OAK):
  - Became the 16th player in Major League history to hit 400 home runs in the eighth inning against the Milwaukee Brewers on June 12.
- Bert Campaneris (OAK):
  - Recorded his 500th career stolen base in the seventh inning against the Detroit Tigers on June 14. He became the 23rd player to reach this mark.
- Fred Lynn (BOS):
  - Became the ninth player to hit at least 10 runs batted in (RBI) in a single game, hitting 10 against the Detroit Tigers on June 18.
- Joe Torre (NYM):
  - Ties a major league record and breaks a National League record when he grounds into four double plays in a single game against the Houston Astros on July 21.
- Lou Brock (STL):
  - Recorded his 800th career stolen base in the first inning against the Atlanta Braves on August 24. He became the third player to reach this mark.
- Davey Lopes (LAD):
  - Broke and set a major league record by stealing his 38th consecutive bases against the Montreal Expos on August 24. The streak began on June 6 against the Philadelphia Phillies. The previous record of 37 stolen bases was held by Max Carey who set the record in 1923.
- Rennie Stennett (PIT):
  - Tied a major league record when he hit seven times in a single nine inning game against the Chicago Cubs on September 16.

=== Pitchers ===
==== No-hitters ====
- Nolan Ryan (CAL):
  - Ryan threw his fourth career no-hitter and sixth no-hitter in franchise history, by defeating the Baltimore Orioles 1–0 on June 1. He walked four and struck out nine.
- Ed Halicki (SF):
  - Halicki threw his first career no-hitter and 11th no-hitter in franchise history, by defeating the New York Mets 6–0 in game two of a doubleheader on August 24. He walked two and struck out 10.
- Vida Blue / Glenn Abbott / Paul Lindblad / Rollie Fingers (OAK):
  - The four pitchers combined to throw the eighth no-hitter in franchise history by defeating the California Angels 5–0 on September 28. It was accomplished with five strikeouts and two walks. Blue pitched the first five innings. It is the third combined no-hitter in major league history. This was the first time that more than two pitcher combined for a no-hitter.

==== Other pitching accomplishments ====
- Bob Gibson (STL):
  - Set a Major League record when he started his 303rd consecutive game against the Cincinnati Reds on May 31. The streak began August 31, 1965 against the Chicago Cubs.

=== Miscellaneous ===
- Houston Astros / San Francisco Giants:
  - Set a National League record for most combined walks in a single game at 26, previously set in 1973 at 25, with the Houston Astros and San Francisco Giants each walking 13, in game two of a doubleheader on May 4 in a game that Houston won 12–8.

== Awards and honors ==
=== Regular season ===
Baseball Writers' Association of America Awards
BBWAA Award	National League	American League
Rookie of the Year	John Montefusco (SF)	Fred Lynn (BOS)
Cy Young Award	Tom Seaver (NYM)	Jim Palmer (BAL)
Most Valuable Player	Joe Morgan (CIN)	Fred Lynn (BOS)
Babe Ruth Award (World Series MVP)	—	Luis Tiant (BOS)
Gold Glove Awards
Position	National League	American League
Pitcher	Andy Messersmith (LAD)	Jim Kaat (CWS)
Catcher	Johnny Bench (CIN)	Thurman Munson (NYY)
1st Base	Steve Garvey (LAD)	George Scott (MIL)
2nd Base	Joe Morgan (CIN)	Bobby Grich (BAL)
3rd Base	Ken Reitz (STL)	Brooks Robinson (BAL)
Shortstop	Dave Concepción (CIN)	Mark Belanger (BAL)
Outfield	César Cedeño (HOU)	Paul Blair (BAL)
Outfield	César Gerónimo (CIN)	Fred Lynn (BOS)
Outfield	Garry Maddox (PHI/SF)	Joe Rudi (OAK)

=== Other awards ===
- Outstanding Designated Hitter Award: Willie Horton (DET)
- Roberto Clemente Award (Humanitarian): Lou Brock (STL)
- Hutch Award: Gary Nolan (CIN)
- Sport Magazine's World Series Most Valuable Player Award: Pete Rose (CIN)

The Sporting News Awards
Award	National League	American League
Player of the Year	Joe Morgan (CIN)	—
Pitcher of the Year	Tom Seaver (NYM)	Jim Palmer (BAL)
Fireman of the Year (Relief pitcher)	Al Hrabosky (STL)	Goose Gossage (CWS)
Rookie Player of the Year	Gary Carter (MON)	Fred Lynn (BOS)
Rookie Pitcher of the Year	John Montefusco (SF)	Dennis Eckersley (CLE)
Comeback Player of the Year	Randy Jones (SD)	Boog Powell (CLE)
Manager of the Year	—	Darrell Johnson (BOS)
Executive of the Year	—	Dick O'Connell (BOS)

=== Monthly awards ===
==== Player of the Month ====
Month	National League	American League
April	Joe Morgan (CIN)	Robin Yount (MIL)
May	Bob Watson (HOU)	Jim Hughes (MIN)
June	Joe Morgan (CIN)	Fred Lynn (BOS)
July	Dave Kingman (NYM)	John Mayberry (KC)
August	Tony Pérez (CIN)	Jim Palmer (BAL)
September	Andre Thornton (CHC)	Gene Tenace (OAK)

==== Pitcher of the Month ====
Month	National League
April	Don Sutton (LAD)
May	Don Sutton (LAD)
June	Tom Seaver (NYM)
July	Al Hrabosky (STL)
August	Burt Hooton (LAD)
September	Burt Hooton (LAD)

=== Baseball Hall of Fame ===
- Earl Averill
- Billy Herman
- Judy Johnson
- Ralph Kiner
- Bucky Harris (manager)

== Home field attendance ==
Team name	Wins	%±	Home attendance	%±	Per game
Los Angeles Dodgers	88	−13.7%	2,539,349	−3.5%	31,350
Cincinnati Reds	108	10.2%	2,315,603	7.0%	28,588
Philadelphia Phillies	86	7.5%	1,909,233	5.6%	23,571
Boston Red Sox	95	13.1%	1,748,587	12.3%	21,587
New York Mets	82	15.5%	1,730,566	0.5%	21,365
St. Louis Cardinals	82	−4.7%	1,695,270	−7.8%	20,674
New York Yankees	83	−6.7%	1,288,048	1.2%	16,513
San Diego Padres	71	18.3%	1,281,747	19.2%	15,824
Pittsburgh Pirates	92	4.5%	1,270,018	14.4%	15,875
Milwaukee Brewers	68	−10.5%	1,213,357	27.0%	14,980
Kansas City Royals	91	18.2%	1,151,836	−1.8%	14,220
Texas Rangers	79	−6.0%	1,127,924	−5.5%	14,099
Oakland Athletics	98	8.9%	1,075,518	27.2%	13,278
Detroit Tigers	57	−20.8%	1,058,836	−14.8%	13,235
California Angels	72	5.9%	1,058,163	15.4%	13,064
Chicago Cubs	75	13.6%	1,034,819	1.9%	12,776
Baltimore Orioles	90	−1.1%	1,002,157	4.1%	13,015
Cleveland Indians	79	2.6%	977,039	−12.3%	12,213
Montreal Expos	75	−5.1%	908,292	−10.9%	11,213
Houston Astros	64	−21.0%	858,002	−21.3%	10,593
Chicago White Sox	75	−6.3%	750,802	−34.7%	9,269
Minnesota Twins	76	−7.3%	737,156	11.3%	8,990
Atlanta Braves	67	−23.9%	534,672	−45.5%	6,683
San Francisco Giants	80	11.1%	522,919	0.6%	6,456

== Venues ==
The New York Yankees play their last of two seasons at Shea Stadium, the home of their cross-town rival New York Mets, playing their last game in a doubleheader on September 28 against the Baltimore Orioles. The team would return to Yankee Stadium in 1976 following the completion of renovations.

== Media ==
=== Television ===
This was the last season that NBC was the exclusive national TV broadcaster of MLB, airing the weekend Game of the Week, Monday Night Baseball, the All-Star Game, both League Championship Series, and the World Series. Beginning in 1976, MLB would split the TV rights between NBC and ABC.

== Retired numbers ==
- Don Wilson had his No. 40 retired by the Houston Astros on April 13. This was the second number retired by the team.
- Harmon Killebrew had his No. 3 retired by the Minnesota Twins on May 4. This was the first number retired by the team.
- Luke Appling had his No. 4 retired by the Chicago White Sox on June 7. This was the first number retired by the team.
- Earl Averill had his No. 3 retired by the Cleveland Indians on June 8. This was the third number retired by the team.
- Bob Gibson had his No. 45 retired by the St. Louis Cardinals on September 1. This was the third number retired by the team.

== See also ==
- 1975 in baseball (Events, Births, Deaths)
- 1975 Nippon Professional Baseball season
