= 1975 Major League Baseball All-Star Game =

1975 American baseball competition

	1	2	3	4	5	6	7	8	9	R	H	E
National League	0	2	1	0	0	0	0	0	3	6	13	1
American League	0	0	0	0	0	3	0	0	0	3	10	1
- Date: July 15, 1975
- Venue: Milwaukee County Stadium
- City: Milwaukee, Wisconsin
- Managers: Walter Alston (LA); Alvin Dark (OAK)
- MVP: Bill Madlock and Jon Matlack (CHC, NYM)
- Attendance: 51,480
- Ceremonial first pitch: Secretary of State Henry Kissinger
- Television: NBC
- TV announcers: Curt Gowdy, Joe Garagiola and Tony Kubek
- Radio: NBC
- Radio announcers: Jim Simpson and Maury Wills

The 1975 Major League Baseball All-Star Game was the 46th midseason exhibition between the all-stars of the American League (AL) and the National League (NL), the two leagues comprising Major League Baseball. The game was played on July 15, 1975, at Milwaukee County Stadium in Milwaukee, Wisconsin, home of the Milwaukee Brewers of the American League. The game resulted in a 6–3 victory for the NL.

While this was the first time that the Brewers were acting as hosts of the All-Star Game, this was not the first time the game had been played at Milwaukee County Stadium. The 1955 game had been played there when the Braves had called Milwaukee home. Thus, Milwaukee County Stadium joined Sportsman's Park in St. Louis and Shibe Park in Philadelphia as the only stadiums to host All-Star Games with two different franchises as host.

This would also be the last time Milwaukee County Stadium would host the game. When the game returned to Milwaukee in 2002, the Brewers had moved into their new home at Miller Park (now American Family Field).

The 1975 All-Star Game saw the start of the tradition of naming honorary captains to the All-Star teams. The first honorary captains were Mickey Mantle (for the AL) and Stan Musial (for the NL).

It would also mark the final All-Star Game in which only "The Star-Spangled Banner", sung this year by Glen Campbell, was performed prior to the game. Beginning the following year, "O Canada" would also be performed as part of the All-Star pregame ceremonies.

== National League roster ==
The National League roster included 8 future Hall of Fame players, denoted in italics.

=== Elected starters ===
Position	Player	Team	Notes
C	Johnny Bench	Cincinnati Reds	
1B	Steve Garvey	Los Angeles Dodgers	
2B	Joe Morgan	Cincinnati Reds	
3B	Ron Cey	Los Angeles Dodgers	
SS	Dave Concepción	Cincinnati Reds	
OF	Lou Brock	St. Louis Cardinals	
OF	Pete Rose	Cincinnati Reds	
OF	Jimmy Wynn	Los Angeles Dodgers	

=== Pitchers ===
Throws	Pitcher	Team	Notes
LH	Randy Jones	San Diego Padres	
RH	Mike Marshall	Los Angeles Dodgers	did not pitch
LH	Jon Matlack	New York Mets	
LH	Tug McGraw	Philadelphia Phillies	did not pitch
RH	Andy Messersmith	Los Angeles Dodgers	did not pitch
RH	Phil Niekro	Atlanta Braves	did not pitch
LH	Jerry Reuss	Pittsburgh Pirates	starting pitcher
RH	Tom Seaver	New York Mets	
RH	Don Sutton	Los Angeles Dodgers	

=== Reserve position players ===
Position	Player	Team	Notes
C	Gary Carter	Montreal Expos	
C	Manny Sanguillén	Pittsburgh Pirates	did not play
1B	Tony Pérez	Cincinnati Reds	
1B	Bob Watson	Houston Astros	
2B	Dave Cash	Philadelphia Phillies	
3B	Bill Madlock	Chicago Cubs	
SS	Larry Bowa	Philadelphia Phillies	
OF	Greg Luzinski	Philadelphia Phillies	
OF	Bobby Murcer	San Francisco Giants	
OF	Al Oliver	Pittsburgh Pirates	
OF	Reggie Smith	St. Louis Cardinals	

=== Coaching staff ===
Position	Manager	Team
Manager	Walter Alston	Los Angeles Dodgers
Coach	Danny Murtaugh	Pittsburgh Pirates
Coach	Red Schoendienst	St. Louis Cardinals

== American League roster ==
The American League roster included 10 future Hall of Fame players, denoted in italics.

=== Elected starters ===
Position	Player	Team	Notes
C	Thurman Munson	New York Yankees	
1B	Gene Tenace	Oakland Athletics	
2B	Rod Carew	Minnesota Twins	
3B	Graig Nettles	New York Yankees	
SS	Bert Campaneris	Oakland Athletics	
OF	Reggie Jackson	Oakland Athletics	
OF	Bobby Bonds	New York Yankees	
OF	Joe Rudi	Oakland Athletics	

=== Pitchers ===
Throws	Pitcher	Team	Notes
LH	Vida Blue	Oakland Athletics	starting pitcher
RH	Steve Busby	Kansas City Royals	
RH	Rollie Fingers	Oakland Athletics	did not pitch
RH	Goose Gossage	Chicago White Sox	
RH	Catfish Hunter	New York Yankees	
LH	Jim Kaat	Chicago White Sox	
RH	Jim Palmer	Baltimore Orioles	did not pitch
RH	Nolan Ryan	California Angels	did not pitch

=== Reserve position players ===
Position	Player	Team	Notes
C	Bill Freehan	Detroit Tigers	did not play
1B	George Scott	Milwaukee Brewers	
1B	Carl Yastrzemski	Boston Red Sox	
2B	Jorge Orta	Chicago White Sox	injured
3B	Dave Chalk	California Angels	did not play
SS	Bucky Dent	Chicago White Sox	
SS	Toby Harrah	Texas Rangers	did not play
OF	Hank Aaron	Milwaukee Brewers	
OF	Mike Hargrove	Texas Rangers	
OF	George Hendrick	Cleveland Indians	
OF	Fred Lynn	Boston Red Sox	
OF	Hal McRae	Kansas City Royals	
OF	Claudell Washington	Oakland Athletics	

=== Coaching staff ===
Position	Manager	Team
Manager	Alvin Dark	Oakland Athletics
Coach	Del Crandall	Milwaukee Brewers
Coach	Billy Martin	Texas Rangers

== Starting lineups ==
While the starters were elected by the fans, the batting orders and starting pitchers were selected by the managers.

National League				American League			
Order	Player	Team	Position	Order	Player	Team	Position
1	Pete Rose	Cincinnati Reds	RF	1	Bobby Bonds	New York Yankees	CF
2	Lou Brock	St. Louis Cardinals	LF	2	Rod Carew	Minnesota Twins	2B
3	Joe Morgan	Cincinnati Reds	2B	3	Thurman Munson	New York Yankees	C
4	Johnny Bench	Cincinnati Reds	C	4	Reggie Jackson	Oakland Athletics	RF
5	Steve Garvey	Los Angeles Dodgers	1B	5	Joe Rudi	Oakland Athletics	LF
6	Jimmy Wynn	Los Angeles Dodgers	CF	6	Graig Nettles	New York Yankees	3B
7	Ron Cey	Los Angeles Dodgers	3B	7	Gene Tenace	Oakland Athletics	1B
8	Dave Concepción	Cincinnati Reds	SS	8	Bert Campaneris	Oakland Athletics	SS
9	Jerry Reuss	Pittsburgh Pirates	P	9	Vida Blue	Oakland Athletics	P

== Umpires ==
Position	Umpire
Home Plate	Bill Haller (AL)
First Base	Chris Pelekoudas (NL)
Second Base	Marty Springstead (AL)
Third Base	Bruce Froemming (NL)
Left Field	Russ Goetz (AL)
Right Field	John McSherry (NL)

== Scoring summary ==
The National League took a 2–0 lead in the top of the second off of AL starter Vida Blue when Steve Garvey and Jimmy Wynn led off the inning by hitting back-to-back home runs.

The NL added another run in the top of the third, this time off of new AL relief pitcher Steve Busby. Lou Brock opened the inning with a single. With Joe Morgan batting, Busby balked, sending Brock to second base. After Morgan flew out, Johnny Bench came to bat, during which, Brock stole third base. Bench singled, scoring Brock from third base to give the NL a 3–0 lead.

The AL did not respond until the bottom of the sixth inning. Tom Seaver had just entered the game as the NL's relief pitcher. Joe Rudi led off with a single, and was immediately replaced for pinch runner George Hendrick. With Graig Nettles batting, Hendrick stole second base. After Nettles struck out, Gene Tenace walked. Carl Yastrzemski pinch hit for Jim Kaat, and hit a home run, scoring Hendrick and Tenace to tie the score.

AL pitcher Catfish Hunter was entering his third inning of relief work when the NL closed out the scoring in the top of the ninth. Reggie Smith singled. Al Oliver, pinch hitting for Jon Matlack, doubled, sending Smith to third base. Catfish Hunter was replaced by relief pitcher Goose Gossage. The next batter, Larry Bowa, was hit by a pitch, and went to first base, loading the bases. Bill Madlock singled, scoring Smith and Oliver, sending Bowa to third base, and advancing himself to second base on a Gene Tenace throwing error. Pete Rose hit a sacrifice fly, scoring Bowa, sending Madlock to third base, and securing a 6–3 win for the National League.

=== Line score ===
Tuesday, July 15, 1975 7:30 pm (CT) at Milwaukee County Stadium in Milwaukee, Wisconsin
Team	1	2	3	4	5	6	7	8	9	R	H	E
National League	0	2	1	0	0	0	0	0	3	6	13	1
American League	0	0	0	0	0	3	0	0	0	3	10	1
WP: Jon Matlack (1-0) LP: Catfish Hunter (0-1); Home runs: NL: Steve Garvey (1), Jimmy Wynn (1); AL: Carl Yastrzemski (1)

== Game notes and records ==
Jon Matlack was credited with the win. Catfish Hunter was charged with the loss.

This was Hank Aaron's 25th and final All-Star Game. It was his first and only appearance for the American League squad, and came in the former home of the Milwaukee Braves, the first Major League team for which he had played.
