= 1974 Milwaukee Brewers season =

1974 Milwaukee Brewers
- League: American League
- Division: East
- Ballpark: Milwaukee County Stadium
- City: Milwaukee, Wisconsin, United States
- Record: 76–86 (.469)
- Divisional place: 5th
- Owners: Bud Selig
- General managers: Jim Wilson
- Managers: Del Crandall
- Television: WTMJ-TV (Ed Doucette, Tom Collins)
- Radio: 620 WTMJ (Merle Harmon, Bob Uecker)
- Stats: ESPN.com; Baseball Reference

The 1974 Milwaukee Brewers season was the 5th season for the Brewers in Milwaukee, and their 6th overall. The Brewers finished fifth in the American League East with a record of 76 wins and 86 losses.

== Offseason ==
- October 22, 1973: Ellie Rodríguez, Ollie Brown, Joe Lahoud, Skip Lockwood, and Gary Ryerson were traded by the Brewers to the California Angels for Clyde Wright, Steve Barber, Ken Berry, Art Kusnyer, and cash.
- March 27, 1974: Steve Barber was released by the Brewers.
- March 30, 1974: Wilbur Howard was traded by the Brewers to the Houston Astros for Larry Yount and Don Stratton (minors).

== Regular season ==
=== Season standings ===
AL East
Team	W	L	Pct.	GB	Home	Road
Baltimore Orioles	91	71	.562	—	46‍–‍35	45‍–‍36
New York Yankees	89	73	.549	2	47‍–‍34	42‍–‍39
Boston Red Sox	84	78	.519	7	46‍–‍35	38‍–‍43
Cleveland Indians	77	85	.475	14	40‍–‍41	37‍–‍44
Milwaukee Brewers	76	86	.469	15	40‍–‍41	36‍–‍45
Detroit Tigers	72	90	.444	19	36‍–‍45	36‍–‍45

=== Record vs. opponents ===
1974 American League record Sources:
Team	BAL	BOS	CAL	CWS	CLE	DET	KC	MIL	MIN	NYY	OAK	TEX
Baltimore	—	10–8	7–5	5–7	12–6	14–4	8–4	8–10	6–6	11–7	6–6	4–8
Boston	8–10	—	4–8	8–4	9–9	11–7	4–8	10–8	6–6	11–7	8–4	5–7
California	5–7	8–4	—	10–8–1	3–9	5–7	8–10	3–9	8–10	3–9	6–12	9–9
Chicago	7–5	4–8	8–10–1	—	8–4	7–5	11–7	8–4	7–11–1	4–8	7–11	9–7–1
Cleveland	6–12	9–9	9–3	4–8	—	9–9	8–4	10–8	6–6	7–11	5–7	4–8
Detroit	4–14	7–11	7–5	5–7	9–9	—	7–5	9–9	3–9	11–7	5–7	5–7
Kansas City	4–8	8–4	10–8	7–11	4–8	5–7	—	11–1	8–10	4–8	8–10	8–10
Milwaukee	10–8	8–10	9–3	4–8	8–10	9–9	1–11	—	6–6	9–9	5–7	7–5
Minnesota	6–6	6–6	10–8	11–7–1	6–6	9–3	10–8	6–6	—	4–8	5–13	9–9
New York	7–11	7–11	9–3	8–4	11–7	7–11	8–4	9–9	8–4	—	7–5	8–4
Oakland	6–6	4–8	12–6	11–7	7–5	7–5	10–8	7–5	13–5	5–7	—	8–10
Texas	8–4	7–5	9–9	7–9–1	8–4	7–5	10–8	5–7	9–9	4–8	10–8	—

=== Notable transactions ===
- June 5, 1974: Jim Gantner was drafted by the Brewers in the 12th round of the 1974 Major League Baseball draft.

=== Opening Day starters ===
- P:Jim Colborn
- C:Darrell Porter
- 1B:George Scott
- 2B:Pedro García
- 3B:Don Money
- SS:Robin Yount
- LF:Johnny Briggs
- RF:Dave May
- CF:Ken Berry
- DH:Bob Coluccio

=== Roster ===
1974 Milwaukee Brewers
Roster
Pitchers: 43 Larry Anderson; 40 Jerry Bell; 35 Bill Castro; 38 Bill Champion; 48 Jim Colborn; 34 Kevin Kobel; 27 Roger Miller; 42 Tom Murphy; 23 Eduardo Rodríguez; 35 Dick Selma; 41 Jim Slaton; 29 Ed Sprague; 25 Bill Travers; 38 Clyde Wright	Catchers: 22 Charlie Moore; 15 Darrell Porter; Infielders: 9 Pedro García; 14 Bob Hansen; 6 Mike Hegan; 3 Deron Johnson; 4 Tim Johnson; 8 Jack Lind; 7 Don Money; 5 George Scott; 2 Bob Sheldon; 21 John Vukovich; 19 Robin Yount	Outfielders: 14 Felipe Alou; 16 Ken Berry; 12 Johnny Briggs; 26 Bob Coluccio; 8 Rob Ellis; 37 Sixto Lezcano; 11 Dave May; 17 Bobby Mitchell; 44 Gorman Thomas	Manager: 1 Del Crandall; Coaches: 31 Harvey Kuenn (Hitting); -- Ken McBride (Pitching); 24 Joe Nossek (Third Base); 30 Jim Walton (First Base); 18 Al Widmar (Pitching)

== Player stats ==
=== Batting ===
==== Starters by position ====
Note: Pos = Position; G = Games played; AB = At bats; H = Hits; Avg. = Batting average; HR = Home runs; RBI = Runs batted in

Pos	Player	G	AB	H	Avg.	HR	RBI
C	Darrell Porter	131	432	104	.241	12	56
1B	George Scott	158	604	170	.281	17	82
2B	Pedro García	141	452	90	.199	12	54
3B	Don Money	159	629	178	.283	15	65
SS	Robin Yount	107	344	86	.250	3	26
LF	Johnny Briggs	154	554	140	.253	17	73
CF	Bob Coluccio	138	394	88	.223	6	31
RF	Dave May	135	477	108	.226	10	42
DH	Bobby Mitchell	88	173	42	.243	5	20

==== Other batters ====
Note: G = Games played; AB = At bats; H = Hits; Avg. = Batting average; HR = Home runs; RBI = Runs batted in

Player	G	AB	H	Avg.	HR	RBI
Ken Berry	98	267	64	.240	1	24
Tim Johnson	93	245	60	.245	0	25
Charlie Moore	72	204	50	.245	0	19
Mike Hegan	89	190	45	.237	7	32
Deron Johnson	49	152	23	.151	6	18
Bob Hansen	58	88	26	.295	2	9
John Vukovich	38	80	15	.188	3	11
Sixto Lezcano	15	54	13	.241	2	9
Rob Ellis	22	48	14	.292	0	4
Gorman Thomas	17	46	12	.261	2	11
Bob Sheldon	10	17	2	.118	0	0
Jack Lind	9	17	4	.235	0	1
Felipe Alou	3	3	0	.000	0	0

=== Pitching ===
==== Starting pitchers ====
Note: G = Games pitched; IP = Innings pitched; W = Wins; L = Losses; ERA = Earned run average; SO = Strikeouts

Player	G	IP	W	L	ERA	SO
Jim Slaton	40	250.0	13	16	3.92	126
Clyde Wright	38	232.0	9	20	4.42	64
Jim Colborn	33	224.0	10	13	4.06	83
Kevin Kobel	34	169.1	6	14	3.99	74
Bill Champion	31	161.2	11	4	3.62	60

==== Other pitchers ====
Note: G = Games pitched; IP = Innings pitched; W = Wins; L = Losses; ERA = Earned run average; SO = Strikeouts

Player	G	IP	W	L	ERA	SO
Eduardo Rodríguez	43	111.2	7	4	3.63	58
Ed Sprague Sr.	20	94.0	7	2	2.39	57

==== Relief pitchers ====
Note: G = Games pitched; W = Wins; L = Losses; SV = Saves; ERA = Earned run average; SO = Strikeouts

Player	G	W	L	SV	ERA	SO
Tom Murphy	70	10	10	20	1.90	47
Bill Travers	23	2	3	0	4.92	31
Bill Castro	8	0	0	0	4.50	10
Jerry Bell	5	0	0	0	2.57	4
Dick Selma	2	0	0	0	19.29	2
Larry Anderson	2	0	0	0	0.00	3
Roger Miller	2	0	0	0	11.57	2

== Farm system ==
The Brewers' farm system consisted of four minor league affiliates in 1974. The Danville Warriors won the Midwest League championship.

Level	Team	League	Manager
Triple-A	Sacramento Solons	Pacific Coast League	Bob Lemon
Double-A	Shreveport Captains	Texas League	Gene Freese and Ken McBride
Class A	Danville Warriors	Midwest League	Matt Galante
Class A Short Season	Newark Co-Pilots	New York–Penn League	John Felske
