= 1972 Milwaukee Brewers season =

1972 Milwaukee Brewers
- League: American League
- Division: East
- Ballpark: Milwaukee County Stadium
- City: Milwaukee, Wisconsin, United States
- Record: 65–91 (.417)
- Divisional place: 6th
- Owners: Bud Selig
- General managers: Frank Lane
- Managers: Dave Bristol, Roy McMillan, Del Crandall
- Television: WTMJ-TV
- Radio: 620 WTMJ (Merle Harmon, Bob Uecker, Tom Collins)
- Stats: ESPN.com; Baseball Reference

The 1972 Milwaukee Brewers season was the 3rd season for the Brewers in Milwaukee, and their 4th overall. The Brewers finished sixth in the American League East with a record of 65 wins and 91 losses. Because of the move of the Washington Senators to Texas, the Brewers shifted from the AL West to the AL East.

== Offseason ==
- October 10, 1971: Marty Pattin, Lew Krausse Jr., Tommy Harper, and Pat Skrable (minors) were traded by the Brewers to the Boston Red Sox for Jim Lonborg, Ken Brett, Billy Conigliaro, Joe Lahoud, Don Pavletich, and George Scott.
- October 22, 1971: Tom Matchick and Bruce Look were traded by the Brewers to the Baltimore Orioles for Mike Ferraro and Mike Herson (minors).
- November 26, 1971: Eduardo Rodríguez was signed as an amateur free agent by the Brewers.
- January 26, 1972: Andy Kosco was traded by the Brewers to the California Angels for Tommie Reynolds.
- March 31, 1972: Frank Tepedino was purchased from the Brewers by the New York Yankees.

== Regular season ==
=== Season standings ===
AL East
Team	W	L	Pct.	GB	Home	Road
Detroit Tigers	86	70	.551	—	44‍–‍34	42‍–‍36
Boston Red Sox	85	70	.548	½	52‍–‍26	33‍–‍44
Baltimore Orioles	80	74	.519	5	38‍–‍39	42‍–‍35
New York Yankees	79	76	.510	6½	46‍–‍31	33‍–‍45
Cleveland Indians	72	84	.462	14	43‍–‍34	29‍–‍50
Milwaukee Brewers	65	91	.417	21	37‍–‍42	28‍–‍49

=== Record vs. opponents ===
1972 American League records Sources:
Team	BAL	BOS	CAL	CWS	CLE	DET	KC	MIL	MIN	NYY	OAK	TEX
Baltimore	—	7–11	6–6	8–4	8–10	10–8	6–6	10–5	6–6	7–6	6–6	6–6
Boston	11–7	—	8–4	6–6	8–7	5–9	6–6	11–7	4–8	9–9	9–3	8–4
California	6–6	4–8	—	7–11	8–4	5–7	9–6	7–5	7–8	4–8	8–10	10–7
Chicago	4–8	6–6	11–7	—	8–4	5–7	8–9	9–3	8–6	7–5	7–8	14–4
Cleveland	10–8	7–8	4–8	4–8	—	10–8	6–6	5–10	8–4	7–11	2–10	9–3
Detroit	8–10	9–5	7–5	7–5	8–10	—	7–5	10–8	9–3	7–9	4–8	10–2
Kansas City	6–6	6–6	6–9	9–8	6–6	5–7	—	7–5	9–9	7–5	7–11	8–6
Milwaukee	5–10	7–11	5–7	3–9	10–5	8–10	5–7	—	4–8	9–9	4–8	5–7
Minnesota	6–6	8–4	8–7	6–8	4–8	3–9	9–9	8–4	—	6–6	8–9	11–7
New York	6–7	9–9	8–4	5–7	11–7	9–7	5–7	9–9	6–6	—	3–9	8–4
Oakland	6–6	3–9	10–8	8–7	10–2	8–4	11–7	8–4	9–8	9–3	—	11–4
Texas	6–6	4–8	7–10	4–14	3–9	2–10	6–8	7–5	7–11	4–8	4–11	—

=== Notable transactions ===
- May 26, 1972: Curt Motton was traded by the Brewers to the California Angels for Archie Reynolds.
- June 6, 1972: Bob Sheldon was drafted by the Brewers in the 22nd round of the 1972 Major League Baseball draft.
- July 10, 1972: Dick Davis was signed as an amateur free agent by the Brewers.
- July 28, 1972: Ron Clark and Paul Ratliff were traded by the Brewers to the California Angels for Joe Azcue and Syd O'Brien.

=== Roster ===
1972 Milwaukee Brewers
Roster
Pitchers: 40 Jerry Bell; 24 Ken Brett; 48 Jim Colborn; 25 Frank Linzy; 42 Skip Lockwood; 27 Jim Lonborg; 49 Ray Newman; 52 Bill Parsons; 49 Archie Reynolds; 43 Gary Ryerson; 20 Ken Sanders; 41 Jim Slaton; 38 Earl Stephenson; 34 Chuck Taylor	Catchers: 17 Joe Azcue; 39 John Felske; 15 Darrell Porter; 5 Paul Ratliff; 6 Ellie Rodríguez; Infielders: 19 Rick Auerbach; 7 Ron Clark; 33 Mike Ferraro; 2 Bob Heise; 7 Syd O'Brien; 5 George Scott; 16 Ron Theobald	Outfielders: 12 Johnny Briggs; 14 Ollie Brown; 9 Billy Conigliaro; 22 Brock Davis; 3 Joe Lahoud; 11 Dave May; 21 Curt Motton; 10 Tommie Reynolds; 32 Bill Voss	Manager: 4 Dave Bristol (4/15 – 5/27); 26 Roy McMillan (5/28 – 5/29); 1 Del Crandall (5/30 – 10/4); Coaches: 31 Harvey Kuenn (First base/hitting); 26 Roy McMillan (Third Base); 30 Jackie Moore (Bullpen); 18 Bob Shaw (Pitching, 9/1 – 10/4); 18 Wes Stock (Pitching, 4/15 – 8/31)

== Player stats ==
=== Batting ===
==== Starters by position ====
Note: Pos = Position; G = Games played; AB = At bats; H = Hits; Avg. = Batting average; HR = Home runs; RBI = Runs batted in

Pos	Player	G	AB	H	Avg.	HR	RBI
C	Ellie Rodríguez	116	355	101	.285	2	35
1B	George Scott	152	578	154	.266	20	88
2B	Ron Theobald	125	391	86	.220	1	19
3B	Mike Ferraro	124	381	97	.255	2	29
SS	Rick Auerbach	153	554	121	.218	2	30
LF	John Briggs	135	418	111	.266	21	65
CF	Dave May	143	500	119	.238	9	45
RF	Joe Lahoud	111	316	75	.237	12	34

==== Other batters ====
Note: Pos = Position; G = Games played; AB = At bats; H = Hits; Avg. = Batting average; HR = Home runs; RBI = Runs batted in

Pos	Player	G	AB	H	Avg.	HR	RBI
2B, 3B, SS	Bob Heise	95	271	72	.266	0	12
OF	Billy Conigliaro	52	191	44	.230	7	16
RF, 3B	Ollie Brown	66	179	50	.279	3	25
OF	Brock Davis	85	154	49	.318	0	12
LF, RF	Tommie Reynolds	72	130	26	.200	2	13
C, 1B	John Felske	37	80	11	.138	1	5
2B, 3B	Syd O'Brien	31	58	12	.207	1	5
C	Darrell Porter	18	56	7	.125	1	2
2B, 3B	Ron Clark	22	54	10	.185	2	5
C	Paul Ratliff	22	42	3	.071	1	4
LF, RF	Bill Voss	27	36	3	.083	0	1
C	Joe Azcue	11	14	2	.143	0	0
LF	Curt Motton	6	6	1	.167	1	2

=== Pitching ===
==== Starting pitchers ====
Note: G = Games pitched; GS = Games started; IP = Innings pitched; W = Wins; L = Losses; ERA = Earned run average; SO = Strikeouts

Player	G	GS	IP	W	L	ERA	SO
Jim Lonborg	33	30	223.0	14	12	2.83	143
Bill Parsons	33	30	214.0	13	13	3.91	111
Skip Lockwood	29	27	170.0	8	15	3.60	106
Ken Brett	26	22	133.0	7	12	4.53	74

==== Other pitchers ====
Note: G = Games pitched; Games started; IP = Innings pitched; W = Wins; L = Losses; ERA = Earned run average; SO = Strikeouts

Player	G	GS	IP	W	L	ERA	SO
Jim Colborn	39	12	147.2	7	7	3.11	92
Gary Ryerson	20	14	102.0	3	8	3.62	45
Earl Stephenson	35	8	80.1	3	5	3.25	33
Jerry Bell	25	3	70.2	5	1	1.66	20
Jim Slaton	9	8	44.0	1	6	5.52	17
Archie Reynolds	5	2	18.2	0	1	7.23	13

==== Relief pitchers ====
Note: G = Games pitched; IP = Innings pitched; W = Wins; L = Losses; SV = Saves; ERA = Earned run average; SO = Strikeouts

Player	G	IP	W	L	SV	ERA	SO
Ken Sanders	62	92.1	2	9	17	3.12	51
Frank Linzy	47	77.1	2	2	12	3.03	24
Chuck Taylor	5	11.2	0	0	1	1.54	5
Ray Newman	4	7.0	0	0	1	0.00	1

== Farm system ==
The Brewers' farm system consisted of four minor league affiliates in 1972. The Evansville Triplets won the American Association championship, and the Danville Warriors won the Midwest League championship.

Level	Team	League	Manager
Triple-A	Evansville Triplets	American Association	Del Crandall and Mike Roarke
Double-A	San Antonio Brewers	Texas League	Mike Roarke, Al Widmar, and Jim Walton
Class A	Danville Warriors	Midwest League	Joe Nossek
Class A Short Season	Newark Co-Pilots	New York–Penn League	Sandy Johnson
