= 1973 Milwaukee Brewers season =

1973 Milwaukee Brewers
- League: American League
- Division: East
- Ballpark: Milwaukee County Stadium
- City: Milwaukee, Wisconsin, United States
- Record: 74–88 (.457)
- Divisional place: 5th
- Owners: Bud Selig
- General managers: Jim Wilson
- Managers: Del Crandall
- Television: WTMJ-TV (Merle Harmon, Bob Uecker, Tom Collins, Johnny Logan)
- Radio: 620 WTMJ (Merle Harmon, Bob Uecker)
- Stats: ESPN.com; Baseball Reference

The 1973 Milwaukee Brewers season was the 4th season for the Brewers in Milwaukee, and their 5th overall. The Brewers finished fifth in the American League East with a record of 74 wins and 88 losses.

== Offseason ==
- October 31, 1972: Jim Lonborg, Ken Brett, Ken Sanders, and Earl Stephenson were traded by the Brewers to the Philadelphia Phillies for Don Money, John Vukovich, and Bill Champion.
- November 15, 1972: Joe Azcue was released by the Brewers.

== Regular season ==
=== Season standings ===
AL East
Team	W	L	Pct.	GB	Home	Road
Baltimore Orioles	97	65	.599	—	50‍–‍31	47‍–‍34
Boston Red Sox	89	73	.549	8	48‍–‍33	41‍–‍40
Detroit Tigers	85	77	.525	12	47‍–‍34	38‍–‍43
New York Yankees	80	82	.494	17	50‍–‍31	30‍–‍51
Milwaukee Brewers	74	88	.457	23	40‍–‍41	34‍–‍47
Cleveland Indians	71	91	.438	26	34‍–‍47	37‍–‍44

=== Record vs. opponents ===
1973 American League record Sources:
Team	BAL	BOS	CAL	CWS	CLE	DET	KC	MIL	MIN	NYY	OAK	TEX
Baltimore	—	7–11	6–6	8–4	12–6	9–9	8–4	15–3	8–4	9–9	5–7	10–2
Boston	11–7	—	7–5	6–6	9–9	3–15	8–4	12–6	6–6	14–4	4–8	9–3
California	6–6	5–7	—	8–10	5–7	7–5	10–8	5–7	10–8	6–6	6–12	11–7
Chicago	4–8	6–6	10–8	—	7–5	5–7	6–12	3–9	9–9	8–4	6–12	13–5
Cleveland	6–12	9–9	7–5	5–7	—	9–9	2–10	9–9	7–5	7–11	3–9	7–5
Detroit	9–9	15–3	5–7	7–5	9–9	—	4–8	12–6	5–7	7–11	7–5	5–7
Kansas City	4–8	4–8	8–10	12–6	10–2	8–4	—	8–4	9–9	6–6	8–10	11–7
Milwaukee	3–15	6–12	7–5	9–3	9–9	6–12	4–8	—	8–4	10–8	4–8	8–4
Minnesota	4–8	6–6	8–10	9–9	5–7	7–5	9–9	4–8	—	3–9	14–4	12–6
New York	9–9	4–14	6–6	4–8	11–7	11–7	6–6	8–10	9–3	—	4–8	8–4
Oakland	7–5	8–4	12–6	12–6	9–3	5–7	10–8	8–4	4–14	8–4	—	11–7
Texas	2–10	3–9	7–11	5–13	5–7	7–5	7–11	4–8	6–12	4–8	7–11	—

=== Notable transactions ===
- June 5, 1973: Robin Yount was drafted by the Brewers in the 1st round (3rd pick) of the 1973 Major League Baseball draft.

=== Roster ===
Milwaukee Brewers
Roster
Pitchers: 40 Jerry Bell; 38 Bill Champion; 48 Jim Colborn; 33 Rob Gardner; 34 Kevin Kobel; 25 Frank Linzy; 42 Skip Lockwood; 49 Ray Newman; 52 Bill Parsons; 46 Ken Reynolds; 23 Eduardo Rodríguez; 43 Gary Ryerson; 27 Chris Short; 41 Jim Slaton; 29 Ed Sprague; 33 Carlos Velázquez	Catchers: 39 John Felske; 22 Charlie Moore; 15 Darrell Porter; 6 Ellie Rodríguez; Infielders: 19 Rick Auerbach; 9 Pedro García; 2 Bob Heise; 4 Tim Johnson; 7 Don Money; 5 George Scott; 21 John Vukovich	Outfielders: 12 Johnny Briggs; 14 Ollie Brown; 26 Bob Coluccio; 28 Wilbur Howard; 3 Joe Lahoud; 11 Dave May; 17 Bobby Mitchell; 44 Gorman Thomas	Manager: 1 Del Crandall; Coaches: 31 Harvey Kuenn (Hitting); 24 Joe Nossek (Third Base); 18 Bob Shaw (Pitching, 4/6 – 6/30); 30 Jim Walton (First Base); 18 Al Widmar (Pitching, 7/1 – 9/30)

== Player stats ==
=== Batting ===
==== Starters by position ====
Note: Pos = Position; G = Games played; AB = At bats; H = Hits; Avg. = Batting average; HR = Home runs; RBI = Runs batted in

Pos	Player	G	AB	H	Avg.	HR	RBI
C	Darrell Porter	117	350	89	.254	16	67
1B	George Scott	158	604	185	.306	24	107
2B	Pedro García	160	580	142	.245	15	54
3B	Don Money	145	556	158	.284	11	61
SS	Tim Johnson	136	465	99	.213	0	32
LF	Johnny Briggs	142	488	120	.246	18	57
CF	Dave May	156	624	189	.303	25	93
RF	Bob Coluccio	124	438	98	.224	15	58
DH	Ollie Brown	97	296	83	.280	7	32

==== Other batters ====
Note: G = Games played; AB = At bats; H = Hits; Avg. = Batting average; HR = Home runs; RBI = Runs batted in

Player	G	AB	H	Avg.	HR	RBI
Ellie Rodríguez	94	290	78	.269	0	30
Joe Lahoud	96	225	46	.204	5	26
Gorman Thomas	60	155	29	.187	2	11
Bobby Mitchell	47	130	29	.223	5	20
John Vukovich	55	128	16	.125	2	9
Bob Heise	49	98	20	.204	0	4
Wilbur Howard	16	39	8	.205	0	1
Charlie Moore	8	27	5	.185	0	3
John Felske	13	22	3	.136	0	4
Rick Auerbach	6	10	1	.100	0	0

=== Pitching ===
==== Starting pitchers ====
Note: G = Games pitched; IP = Innings pitched; W = Wins; L = Losses; ERA = Earned run average; SO = Strikeouts

Player	G	IP	W	L	ERA	SO
Jim Colborn	43	314.1	20	12	3.18	135
Jim Slaton	38	276.1	13	15	3.71	134
Jerry Bell	31	183.2	9	9	3.97	57
Bill Parsons	20	59.2	3	6	6.79	30

==== Other pitchers ====
Note: G = Games pitched; IP = Innings pitched; W = Wins; L = Losses; ERA = Earned run average; SO = Strikeouts

Player	G	IP	W	L	ERA	SO
Bill Champion	37	163.1	5	8	3.70	67
Skip Lockwood	37	154.2	5	12	3.90	87
Eduardo Rodriguez	30	76.1	9	7	3.30	49
Gary Ryerson	9	23.0	0	1	7.83	10
Kevin Kobel	2	8.1	0	1	8.64	4
Ken Reynolds	2	7.1	0	1	7.36	3

==== Relief pitchers ====
Note: G = Games pitched; W = Wins; L = Losses; SV = Saves; ERA = Earned run average; SO = Strikeouts

Player	G	W	L	SV	ERA	SO
Frank Linzy	42	2	6	13	3.57	21
Chris Short	42	3	5	2	5.13	44
Carlos Velázquez	18	2	2	2	2.58	12
Ray Newman	11	2	1	1	2.95	10
Rob Gardner	10	1	1	1	9.95	5
Ed Sprague	7	0	1	1	9.31	3

== Farm system ==
The Brewers' farm system consisted of four minor league affiliates in 1973.

Level	Team	League	Manager
Triple-A	Evansville Triplets	American Association	Mike Roarke
Double-A	Shreveport Captains	Texas League	Gene Freese
Class A	Danville Warriors	Midwest League	Bernie Smith
Class A Short Season	Newark Co-Pilots	New York–Penn League	Matt Galante
