= 1974 California Angels season =

Major League Baseball season

1974 California Angels
- League: American League
- Division: West
- Ballpark: Anaheim Stadium
- City: Anaheim, California
- Record: 68–94 (.420)
- Divisional place: 6th
- Owner: Gene Autry
- General manager: Harry Dalton
- Managers: Bobby Winkles, Whitey Herzog, Dick Williams
- Television: KTLA
- Radio: KMPC (Dick Enberg, Dave Niehaus, Don Drysdale)
- Stats: ESPN.com; Baseball Reference

The 1974 California Angels season was the 14th season of the Angels franchise in the American League, the 9th in Anaheim, and their 9th season playing their home games at Anaheim Stadium. The Angels finished the season sixth in the American League West with a record of 68 wins and 94 losses. This was the Angels' first last place divisional finish in franchise history.

== Offseason ==
- October 22, 1973: Clyde Wright, Steve Barber, Ken Berry, Art Kusnyer, and cash were traded by the Angels to the Milwaukee Brewers for Ellie Rodríguez, Ollie Brown, Joe Lahoud, Skip Lockwood, and Gary Ryerson.
- December 6, 1973: Aurelio Monteagudo and Chris Coletta were sent by the Angels to the Philadelphia Phillies for Denny Doyle to complete an earlier deal (the Angels sent Billy Grabarkewitz and players to be named later to the Phillies for a player to be named later) made on August 14, 1973.

== Regular season ==
On August 25, Nolan Ryan struck out Sandy Alomar for the 1,500th strikeout of his career. Ryan and Alomar had been teammates earlier in the season before Alomar was sold to the Yankees on July 8.

=== Season standings ===
AL West
Team	W	L	Pct.	GB	Home	Road
Oakland Athletics	90	72	.556	—	49‍–‍32	41‍–‍40
Texas Rangers	84	76	.525	5	42‍–‍38	42‍–‍38
Minnesota Twins	82	80	.506	8	48‍–‍33	34‍–‍47
Chicago White Sox	80	80	.500	9	46‍–‍34	34‍–‍46
Kansas City Royals	77	85	.475	13	40‍–‍41	37‍–‍44
California Angels	68	94	.420	22	36‍–‍45	32‍–‍49

=== Record vs. opponents ===
1974 American League record Sources:
Team	BAL	BOS	CAL	CWS	CLE	DET	KC	MIL	MIN	NYY	OAK	TEX
Baltimore	—	10–8	7–5	5–7	12–6	14–4	8–4	8–10	6–6	11–7	6–6	4–8
Boston	8–10	—	4–8	8–4	9–9	11–7	4–8	10–8	6–6	11–7	8–4	5–7
California	5–7	8–4	—	10–8–1	3–9	5–7	8–10	3–9	8–10	3–9	6–12	9–9
Chicago	7–5	4–8	8–10–1	—	8–4	7–5	11–7	8–4	7–11–1	4–8	7–11	9–7–1
Cleveland	6–12	9–9	9–3	4–8	—	9–9	8–4	10–8	6–6	7–11	5–7	4–8
Detroit	4–14	7–11	7–5	5–7	9–9	—	7–5	9–9	3–9	11–7	5–7	5–7
Kansas City	4–8	8–4	10–8	7–11	4–8	5–7	—	11–1	8–10	4–8	8–10	8–10
Milwaukee	10–8	8–10	9–3	4–8	8–10	9–9	1–11	—	6–6	9–9	5–7	7–5
Minnesota	6–6	6–6	10–8	11–7–1	6–6	9–3	10–8	6–6	—	4–8	5–13	9–9
New York	7–11	7–11	9–3	8–4	11–7	7–11	8–4	9–9	8–4	—	7–5	8–4
Oakland	6–6	4–8	12–6	11–7	7–5	7–5	10–8	7–5	13–5	5–7	—	8–10
Texas	8–4	7–5	9–9	7–9–1	8–4	7–5	10–8	5–7	9–9	4–8	10–8	—

=== Notable transactions ===
- April 30, 1974: Richie Scheinblum was traded by the Angels to the Kansas City Royals for Paul Schaal.
- May 4, 1974: Mike Epstein was released by the Angels.
- June 5, 1974: Greg Harris was drafted by the Angels in the 10th round of the 1974 Major League Baseball draft, but did not sign.
- June 15, 1974: Rudy May was purchased from the Angels by the New York Yankees.
- July 8, 1974: Sandy Alomar Sr. was purchased from the Angels by the New York Yankees.
- July 28, 1974: Rick Stelmaszek was traded by the Angels to the Chicago Cubs for Horacio Piña.
- September 12, 1974: Frank Robinson was traded by the Angels to the Cleveland Indians for Ken Suarez, Rusty Torres, and cash.

=== Roster ===
1974 California Angels
Roster
Pitchers: 47 John Cumberland; 45 Chuck Dobson; 37 Ed Figueroa; 38 Bill Gilbreth; 42 Andy Hassler; 52 Don Kirkwood; 35 Dick Lange; 41 Skip Lockwood; 34 Rudy May; 51 Orlando Peña; 34 Horacio Piña; 44 Luis Quintana; 31 Barry Raziano; 30 Nolan Ryan; 39 Ken Sanders; 29 Dave Sells; 39 Dick Selma; 48 Bill Singer; 26 Bill Stoneman; 40 Frank Tanana	Catchers: 10 Tom Egan; 6 Ellie Rodríguez; 19 Charlie Sands; Infielders: 24 Sandy Alomar Sr.; 7 Dave Chalk; 5 John Doherty; 15 Denny Doyle; 5 Mike Epstein; 9 Bob Heise; 22 Tommy McCraw; 3 Rudy Meoli; 33 Bob Oliver; 1 Orlando Ramírez; 9 Paul Schaal	Outfielders: 8 John Balaz; 22 Bruce Bochte; 14 Doug Howard; 4 Joe Lahoud; 12 Winston Llenas; 16 Morris Nettles; 17 Mickey Rivers; 20 Frank Robinson; 9 Richie Scheinblum; 36 Leroy Stanton; 13 Bobby Valentine	Manager: 24 Whitey Herzog; 23 Dick Williams; 1 Bobby Winkles; Coaches: 23,24 Whitey Herzog; 27 Tom Morgan; 26 Billy Muffett; 21 Salty Parker; 50 Jimmie Reese; 2 John Roseboro

== Player stats ==
=== Batting ===
==== Starters by position ====
Note: Pos = Position; G = Games played; AB = At bats; H = Hits; Avg. = Batting average; HR = Home runs; RBI = Runs batted in

Pos	Player	G	AB	H	Avg.	HR	RBI
C	Ellie Rodríguez	140	395	100	.253	7	36
1B	John Doherty	74	223	57	.256	3	15
2B	Denny Doyle	147	511	133	.260	1	34
3B	Paul Schaal	53	165	41	.248	2	20
SS	Dave Chalk	133	465	117	.252	5	31
LF	Bobby Valentine	117	371	97	.261	3	39
CF	Mickey Rivers	118	466	133	.285	3	31
RF	Leroy Stanton	118	415	111	.267	11	62
DH	Frank Robinson	129	427	107	.251	20	63

==== Other batters ====
Note: G = Games played; AB = At bats; H = Hits; Avg. = Batting average; HR = Home runs; RBI = Runs batted in

Player	G	AB	H	Avg.	HR	RBI
Bob Oliver	110	359	89	.248	8	55
Joe Lahoud	127	325	88	.271	13	44
Bruce Bochte	57	196	53	.270	5	26
Morris Nettles	56	175	48	.274	0	8
Winston Llenas	72	138	36	.261	2	17
Tommy McCraw	56	119	34	.286	3	17
Tom Egan	43	94	11	.117	0	4
Rudy Meoli	36	90	22	.244	0	3
Orlando Ramírez	31	86	14	.163	0	7
Charlie Sands	43	83	16	.193	4	13
Bob Heise	29	75	20	.267	0	6
Mike Epstein	18	62	10	.161	4	6
Sandy Alomar Sr.	46	54	12	.222	0	1
John Balaz	14	42	10	.238	1	5
Doug Howard	22	39	9	.231	0	5
Richie Scheinblum	10	26	4	.154	0	2

=== Pitching ===
==== Starting pitchers ====
Note: G = Games pitched; IP = Innings pitched; W = Wins; L = Losses; ERA = Earned run average; SO = Strikeouts

Player	G	IP	W	L	ERA	SO
Nolan Ryan	42	332.2	22	16	2.89	367
Frank Tanana	39	268.2	14	19	3.12	180
Andy Hassler	23	162.0	7	11	2.61	76
Dick Lange	21	113.2	3	8	3.80	57
Bill Singer	14	108.2	7	4	2.98	77
Bill Stoneman	13	58.2	1	8	6.14	33
Chuck Dobson	5	30.0	2	3	5.70	16

==== Other pitchers ====
Note: G = Games pitched; IP = Innings pitched; W = Wins; L = Losses; ERA = Earned run average; SO = Strikeouts

Player	G	IP	W	L	ERA	SO
Ed Figueroa	25	105.1	2	8	3.67	49

==== Relief pitchers ====
Note: G = Games pitched; W = Wins; L = Losses; SV = Saves; ERA = Earned run average; SO = Strikeouts

Player	G	W	L	SV	ERA	SO
Skip Lockwood	37	2	5	1	4.32	39
Dave Sells	20	2	3	2	3.69	14
Rudy May	18	0	1	2	7.00	12
Dick Selma	18	2	2	1	5.09	15
Luis Quintana	18	2	1	0	4.26	11
John Cumberland	17	0	1	0	3.74	12
Barry Raziano	13	1	2	1	6.48	9
Horacio Piña	11	1	2	0	2.31	6
Ken Sanders	9	0	0	1	2.79	4
Orlando Peña	4	0	0	3	0.00	5
Don Kirkwood	3	0	0	0	8.59	4
Bill Gilbreth	3	0	0	0	13.50	0

== Farm system ==
Level	Team	League	Manager
AAA	Salt Lake City Angels	Pacific Coast League	Norm Sherry
AA	El Paso Diablos	Texas League	Dave Garcia
A	Salinas Packers	California League	Jim Saul
A	Quad Cities Angels	Midwest League	Jimy Williams
Rookie	Idaho Falls Angels	Pioneer League	Larry Himes

LEAGUE CHAMPIONS: Idaho Falls

Records
Preceded by 1973	California Angels seasons 1974	Succeeded by 1975
