= 1972 California Angels season =

Major League Baseball season

1972 California Angels
- League: American League
- Division: West
- Ballpark: Anaheim Stadium
- City: Anaheim, California
- Record: 75–80 (.484)
- Divisional place: 5th
- Owner: Gene Autry
- General manager: Harry Dalton
- Manager: Del Rice
- Television: KTLA
- Radio: KMPC (Dick Enberg, Don Wells, Dave Niehaus)
- Stats: ESPN.com; Baseball Reference

The 1972 California Angels season was the 12th season of the Angels franchise in the American League, the 7th in Anaheim, and their 7th season playing their home games at Anaheim Stadium. The Angels finished the season fifth in the American League West with a record of 75 wins and 80 losses.

== Offseason ==
- October 27, 1971: Tony González was released by the Angels.
- December 10, 1971: Jim Fregosi was traded by the Angels to the New York Mets for Nolan Ryan, Don Rose, Leroy Stanton, and Frank Estrada.
- January 26, 1972: Tommie Reynolds was traded by the Angels to the Milwaukee Brewers for Andy Kosco.

== Regular season ==
- April 18, 1972: Nolan Ryan struck out Charlie Manuel for the 500th strikeout of his career.

=== Opening Day starters ===
- Sandy Alomar Sr.
- Leo Cárdenas
- Ken McMullen
- Andy Messersmith
- Vada Pinson
- Mickey Rivers
- Jim Spencer
- Leroy Stanton
- Jeff Torborg

=== Season standings ===
AL West
Team	W	L	Pct.	GB	Home	Road
Oakland Athletics	93	62	.600	—	48‍–‍29	45‍–‍33
Chicago White Sox	87	67	.565	5½	55‍–‍23	32‍–‍44
Minnesota Twins	77	77	.500	15½	42‍–‍32	35‍–‍45
Kansas City Royals	76	78	.494	16½	44‍–‍33	32‍–‍45
California Angels	75	80	.484	18	44‍–‍36	31‍–‍44
Texas Rangers	54	100	.351	38½	31‍–‍46	23‍–‍54

=== Record vs. opponents ===
1972 American League records Sources:
Team	BAL	BOS	CAL	CWS	CLE	DET	KC	MIL	MIN	NYY	OAK	TEX
Baltimore	—	7–11	6–6	8–4	8–10	10–8	6–6	10–5	6–6	7–6	6–6	6–6
Boston	11–7	—	8–4	6–6	8–7	5–9	6–6	11–7	4–8	9–9	9–3	8–4
California	6–6	4–8	—	7–11	8–4	5–7	9–6	7–5	7–8	4–8	8–10	10–7
Chicago	4–8	6–6	11–7	—	8–4	5–7	8–9	9–3	8–6	7–5	7–8	14–4
Cleveland	10–8	7–8	4–8	4–8	—	10–8	6–6	5–10	8–4	7–11	2–10	9–3
Detroit	8–10	9–5	7–5	7–5	8–10	—	7–5	10–8	9–3	7–9	4–8	10–2
Kansas City	6–6	6–6	6–9	9–8	6–6	5–7	—	7–5	9–9	7–5	7–11	8–6
Milwaukee	5–10	7–11	5–7	3–9	10–5	8–10	5–7	—	4–8	9–9	4–8	5–7
Minnesota	6–6	8–4	8–7	6–8	4–8	3–9	9–9	8–4	—	6–6	8–9	11–7
New York	6–7	9–9	8–4	5–7	11–7	9–7	5–7	9–9	6–6	—	3–9	8–4
Oakland	6–6	3–9	10–8	8–7	10–2	8–4	11–7	8–4	9–8	9–3	—	11–4
Texas	6–6	4–8	7–10	4–14	3–9	2–10	6–8	7–5	7–11	4–8	4–11	—

=== Notable transactions ===
- May 2, 1972: Billy Cowan was released by the Angels.
- May 16, 1972: Steve Barber was signed as a free agent by the Angels.
- May 26, 1972: Archie Reynolds was traded by the Angels to the Milwaukee Brewers for Curt Motton.
- July 28, 1972: Joe Azcue and Syd O'Brien were traded by the Angels to the Milwaukee Brewers for Ron Clark and Paul Ratliff.
- August 1, 1972: Fred Kuhaulua was signed as an amateur free agent by the Angels.
- August 15, 1972: Andy Kosco was traded by the Angels to the Boston Red Sox for Chris Coletta.
- August 17, 1972: Eddie Fisher was traded by the California Angels to the Chicago White Sox for a player to be named later and Bruce Miller. The Chicago White Sox sent Bruce Kimm (September 1, 1972) to the California Angels to complete the trade.

=== Roster ===
1972 California Angels
Roster
Pitchers: 40 Lloyd Allen; 31 Steve Barber; 44 Rickey Clark; 48 Paul Doyle; 15 Tom Dukes; 24 Eddie Fisher; 32 Alan Foster; 35 Dick Lange; 34 Rudy May; 47 Andy Messersmith; 41 Tom Murphy; 46 Mel Queen; 41 Don Rose; 30 Nolan Ryan; 46 Dave Sells; 38 Clyde Wright	Catchers: 31 Joe Azcue; 8 Jack Hiatt; 39 Art Kusnyer; 37 John Stephenson; 10 Jeff Torborg; Infielders: 2 Sandy Alomar Sr.; 17 Leo Cárdenas; 12 Winston Llenas; 4 Ken McMullen; 8 Syd O'Brien; 33 Bob Oliver; 18 Billy Parker; 9 Jim Spencer	Outfielders: 16 Ken Berry; 14 Chris Coletta; 29 Doug Howard; 29 Andy Kosco; 6 Curt Motton; 28 Vada Pinson; 5 Mickey Rivers; 33 Tom Silverio; 36 Leroy Stanton; Other batters: 14 Billy Cowan; 6 Roger Repoz	Manager: 7 Del Rice; Coaches: 22 Peanuts Lowrey; 27 Tom Morgan; 20 John Roseboro; 21 Bobby Winkles

== Player stats ==
=== Batting ===
==== Starters by position ====
Note: Pos = Position; G = Games played; AB = At bats; H = Hits; Avg. = Batting average; HR = Home runs; RBI = Runs batted in

Pos	Player	G	AB	H	Avg.	HR	RBI
C	Art Kusnyer	64	179	37	.207	2	13
1B	Bob Oliver	134	509	137	.269	19	70
2B	Sandy Alomar Sr.	155	610	146	.239	1	25
3B	Ken McMullen	137	472	127	.269	9	34
SS	Leo Cárdenas	150	551	123	.223	6	42
LF	Vada Pinson	136	484	133	.275	7	49
CF	Ken Berry	119	409	118	.289	5	39
RF	Leroy Stanton	127	402	101	.251	12	39

==== Other batters ====
Note: G = Games played; AB = At bats; H = Hits; Avg. = Batting average; HR = Home runs; RBI = Runs batted in

Player	G	AB	H	Avg.	HR	RBI
Jim Spencer	82	212	47	.222	1	14
Mickey Rivers	58	159	34	.214	0	7
Jeff Torborg	59	153	32	.209	0	8
John Stephenson	66	146	40	.274	2	17
Andy Kosco	49	142	34	.239	6	13
Billy Parker	36	80	17	.213	2	8
Winston Llenas	44	64	17	.266	0	7
Jack Hiatt	22	45	13	.289	1	5
Syd O'Brien	36	39	7	.179	1	1
Curt Motton	42	39	6	.154	0	1
Doug Howard	11	38	10	.263	0	2
Chris Coletta	14	30	9	.300	1	7
Tom Silverio	13	12	2	.167	0	0
Roger Repoz	3	3	1	.333	0	0
Billy Cowan	3	3	0	.000	0	0
Joe Azcue	3	2	0	.000	0	0

=== Pitching ===
= Indicates league leader

==== Starting pitchers ====
Note: G = Games pitched; IP = Innings pitched; W = Wins; L = Losses; ERA = Earned run average; SO = Strikeouts

Player	G	IP	W	L	ERA	SO
Nolan Ryan	39	284.0	19	16	2.28	329
Clyde Wright	35	251.0	18	11	2.98	87
Rudy May	35	205.1	12	11	2.94	169
Andy Messersmith	25	169.2	8	11	2.81	142

==== Other pitchers ====
Note: G = Games pitched; IP = Innings pitched; W = Wins; L = Losses; ERA = Earned run average; SO = Strikeouts

Player	G	IP	W	L	ERA	SO
Rickey Clark	26	109.2	4	9	4.51	61
Don Rose	16	42.2	1	4	4.22	39
Dick Lange	2	7.2	0	0	4.70	8

==== Relief pitchers ====
Note: G = Games pitched; W = Wins; L = Losses; SV = Saves; ERA = Earned run average; SO = Strikeouts

Player	G	W	L	SV	ERA	SO
Lloyd Allen	42	3	7	5	3.48	53
Eddie Fisher	43	4	5	4	3.76	32
Steve Barber	34	4	4	2	2.02	34
Mel Queen	17	0	0	0	4.35	19
Dave Sells	10	2	0	0	2.81	2
Alan Foster	8	0	1	0	4.97	11
Tom Dukes	7	0	1	1	1.64	8
Tom Murphy	6	0	0	0	5.40	2
Paul Doyle	2	0	0	0	0.00	4

== Farm system ==
Level	Team	League	Manager
AAA	Salt Lake City Angels	Pacific Coast League	Les Moss
AA	Shreveport Captains	Texas League	Norm Sherry
A	Stockton Ports	California League	Mike Stubbins
A	Quad Cities Angels	Midwest League	Dick Kinaman
Rookie	Idaho Falls Angels	Pioneer League	Bob Clear

Records
Preceded by 1971	California Angels seasons 1972	Succeeded by 1973
