= 1973 California Angels season =

Major League Baseball season

1973 California Angels
- League: American League
- Division: West
- Ballpark: Anaheim Stadium
- City: Anaheim, California
- Record: 79–83 (.488)
- Divisional place: 4th
- Owner: Gene Autry
- General manager: Harry Dalton
- Manager: Bobby Winkles
- Television: KTLA
- Radio: KMPC (Dick Enberg, Dave Niehaus, Don Drysdale)
- Stats: ESPN.com; Baseball Reference

The 1973 California Angels season was the 13th season of the Angels franchise in the American League, the 8th in Anaheim, and their 8th season playing their home games at Anaheim Stadium. The Angels finished the season fourth in the American League West with a record of 79 wins and 83 losses.

== Offseason ==
- November 28, 1972: Andy Messersmith and Ken McMullen were traded by the Angels to the Los Angeles Dodgers for Frank Robinson, Billy Grabarkewitz, Bill Singer, Mike Strahler, and Bobby Valentine.

== Regular season ==
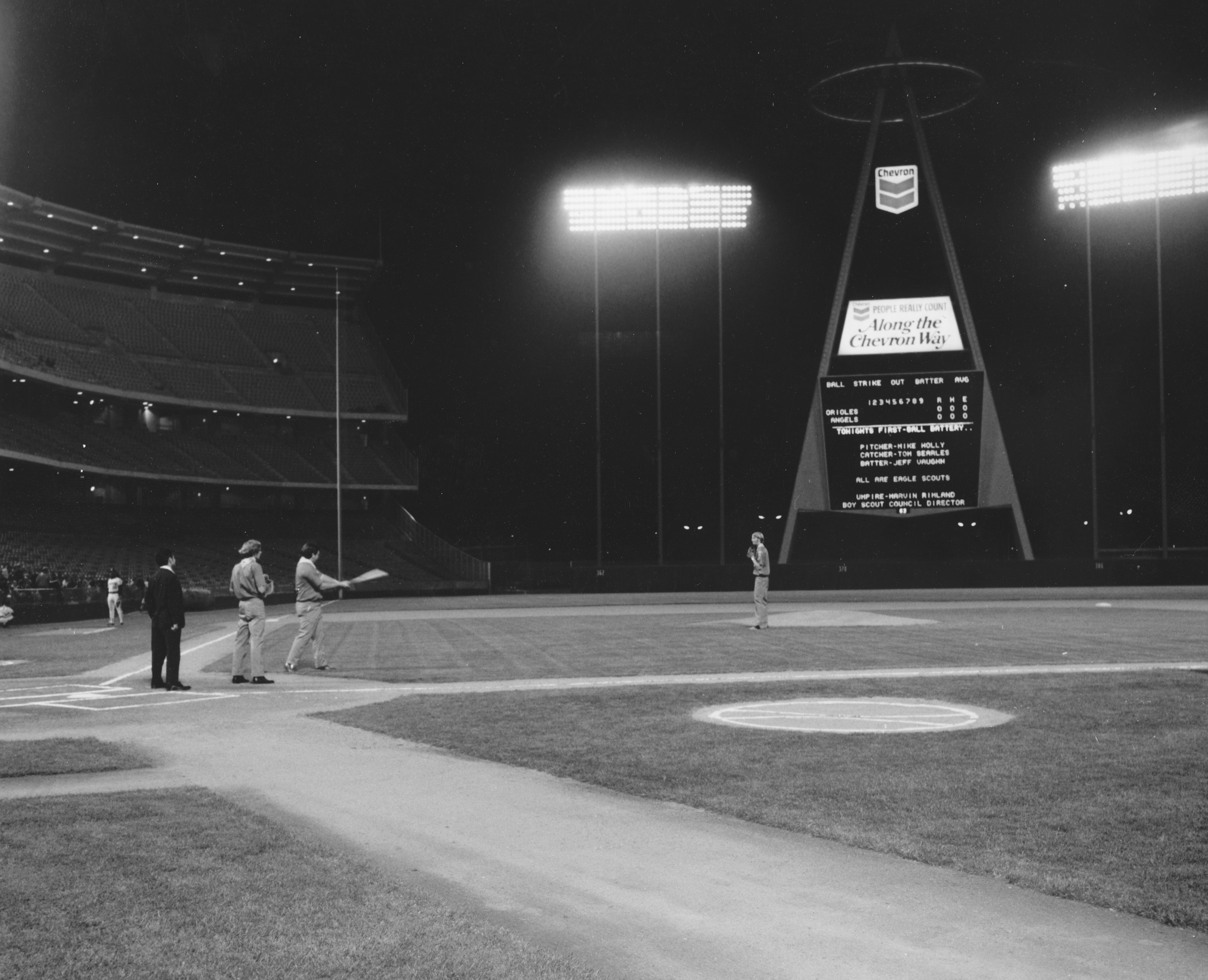
Night game in 1973

1973 was an eventful season for Angels pitcher Nolan Ryan. On May 15, Ryan threw the first no-hitter of his career. On July 3, he struck out Sal Bando of the Oakland Athletics for the 1000th strikeout in his career. Twelve days later, Ryan threw a second no-hitter, becoming the fifth pitcher in major league history to throw two no-hitters in one season.

For the year, Ryan set what is, as of 2022, the post-1900 Major League Baseball record for most strikeouts in a season with 383, topping Sandy Koufax's 1965 mark by one. (The all-time record belongs to Matt Kilroy, who struck out 513 batters in 1886). In the process, he struck out at least 10 batters in 23 different games.

=== Season standings ===
AL West
Team	W	L	Pct.	GB	Home	Road
Oakland Athletics	94	68	.580	—	50‍–‍31	44‍–‍37
Kansas City Royals	88	74	.543	6	48‍–‍33	40‍–‍41
Minnesota Twins	81	81	.500	13	37‍–‍44	44‍–‍37
California Angels	79	83	.488	15	43‍–‍38	36‍–‍45
Chicago White Sox	77	85	.475	17	40‍–‍41	37‍–‍44
Texas Rangers	57	105	.352	37	35‍–‍46	22‍–‍59

=== Record vs. opponents ===
1973 American League record Sources:
Team	BAL	BOS	CAL	CWS	CLE	DET	KC	MIL	MIN	NYY	OAK	TEX
Baltimore	—	7–11	6–6	8–4	12–6	9–9	8–4	15–3	8–4	9–9	5–7	10–2
Boston	11–7	—	7–5	6–6	9–9	3–15	8–4	12–6	6–6	14–4	4–8	9–3
California	6–6	5–7	—	8–10	5–7	7–5	10–8	5–7	10–8	6–6	6–12	11–7
Chicago	4–8	6–6	10–8	—	7–5	5–7	6–12	3–9	9–9	8–4	6–12	13–5
Cleveland	6–12	9–9	7–5	5–7	—	9–9	2–10	9–9	7–5	7–11	3–9	7–5
Detroit	9–9	15–3	5–7	7–5	9–9	—	4–8	12–6	5–7	7–11	7–5	5–7
Kansas City	4–8	4–8	8–10	12–6	10–2	8–4	—	8–4	9–9	6–6	8–10	11–7
Milwaukee	3–15	6–12	7–5	9–3	9–9	6–12	4–8	—	8–4	10–8	4–8	8–4
Minnesota	4–8	6–6	8–10	9–9	5–7	7–5	9–9	4–8	—	3–9	14–4	12–6
New York	9–9	4–14	6–6	4–8	11–7	11–7	6–6	8–10	9–3	—	4–8	8–4
Oakland	7–5	8–4	12–6	12–6	9–3	5–7	10–8	8–4	4–14	8–4	—	11–7
Texas	2–10	3–9	7–11	5–13	5–7	7–5	7–11	4–8	6–12	4–8	7–11	—

=== Notable transactions ===
- May 20, 1973: Jim Spencer and Lloyd Allen were traded by the Angels to the Texas Rangers for Mike Epstein, Rich Hand and Rick Stelmaszek.
- June 5, 1973: Brian Kingman was drafted by the Angels in the 12th round of the 1973 Major League Baseball draft, but did not sign.
- July 16, 1973: Curt Motton was released by the Angels.

=== Roster ===
1973 California Angels
Roster
Pitchers: 40 Lloyd Allen; 31 Steve Barber; 25 Rich Hand; 42 Andy Hassler; 35 Dick Lange; 34 Rudy May; 41 Aurelio Monteagudo; 45 Ron Perranoski; 30 Nolan Ryan; 29 Dave Sells; 48 Bill Singer; 40 Frank Tanana; 47 Terry Wilshusen; 38 Clyde Wright	Catchers: 15 Art Kusnyer; 19 Charlie Sands; 8 Rick Stelmaszek; 11 John Stephenson; 10 Jeff Torborg; Infielders: 24 Sandy Alomar Sr.; 7 Dave Chalk; 19 Jerry DaVanon; 5 Mike Epstein; 6 Al Gallagher; 7 Billy Grabarkewitz; 12 Winston Llenas; 3 Rudy Meoli; 33 Bob Oliver; 18 Billy Parker; 9 Jim Spencer; 13 Bobby Valentine	Outfielders: 16 Ken Berry; 17 Bobby Brooks; 4 Doug Howard; 22 Tommy McCraw; 28 Vada Pinson; 5,17 Mickey Rivers; 20 Frank Robinson; 9 Richie Scheinblum; 36 Leroy Stanton	Manager: 1 Bobby Winkles; Coaches: 27 Tom Morgan; 21 Salty Parker; 23 Jimmie Reese; 2 John Roseboro

== Player stats ==
=== Batting ===
==== Starters by position ====
Note: Pos = Position; G = Games played; AB = At bats; H = Hits; Avg. = Batting average; HR = Home runs; RBI = Runs batted in

Pos	Player	G	AB	H	Avg.	HR	RBI
C	Jeff Torborg	102	255	56	.220	1	18
1B	Mike Epstein	91	312	67	.215	8	32
2B	Sandy Alomar Sr.	136	470	112	.238	0	28
SS	Rudy Meoli	120	305	68	.223	2	23
3B	Al Gallagher	110	311	85	.273	0	26
LF	Vada Pinson	124	466	121	.260	8	57
CF	Ken Berry	137	415	118	.284	3	36
RF	Leroy Stanton	119	306	72	.235	8	34
DH	Frank Robinson	147	534	142	.266	30	97

==== Other batters ====
Note: G = Games played; AB = At bats; H = Hits; Avg. = Batting average; HR = Home runs; RBI = Runs batted in

Player	G	AB	H	Avg.	HR	RBI
Bob Oliver	151	544	144	.265	18	89
Tom McCraw	99	264	70	.265	3	24
Richie Scheinblum	77	229	75	.328	3	21
Winston Llenas	78	130	35	.269	1	25
Billy Grabarkewitz	61	129	21	.163	3	9
Mickey Rivers	32	129	45	.349	0	16
Bobby Valentine	32	126	38	.302	1	13
John Stephenson	60	122	30	.246	1	9
Billy Parker	38	102	23	.225	0	7
Jim Spencer	29	87	21	.241	2	11
Dave Chalk	24	69	16	.232	0	6
Art Kusnyer	41	64	8	.125	0	3
Jerry DaVanon	41	49	12	.245	0	2
Charlie Sands	17	33	9	.273	1	5
Rick Stelmaszek	22	26	4	.154	0	3
Doug Howard	8	21	2	.095	0	1
Bobby Brooks	4	7	1	.143	0	0

=== Pitching ===
==== Starting pitchers ====
Note: G = Games pitched; IP = Innings pitched; W = Wins; L = Losses; ERA = Earned run average; SO = Strikeouts

Player	G	IP	W	L	ERA	SO
Nolan Ryan	41	326.0	21	16	2.87	383
Bill Singer	40	315.2	20	14	3.22	241
Clyde Wright	37	257.0	11	19	3.68	65
Rudy May	34	185.0	7	17	4.38	134
Frank Tanana	4	26.1	2	2	3.08	22

==== Other pitchers ====
Note: G = Games pitched; IP = Innings pitched; W = Wins; L = Losses; ERA = Earned run average; SO = Strikeouts

Player	G	IP	W	L	ERA	SO
Rich Hand	16	54.2	4	3	3.62	19
Dick Lange	17	52.2	2	1	4.44	27
Andy Hassler	7	31.2	0	4	3.69	19

==== Relief pitchers ====
Note: G = Games pitched; W = Wins; L = Losses; SV = Saves; ERA = Earned run average; SO = Strikeouts

Player	G	W	L	SV	ERA	SO
Dave Sells	51	7	2	10	3.71	25
Steve Barber	50	3	2	4	3.53	58
Aurelio Monteagudo	15	2	1	3	4.20	8
Ron Perranoski	8	0	2	0	4.09	5
Lloyd Allen	5	0	0	1	10.38	4
Terry Wilshusen	1	0	0	0	81.00	0

== Farm system ==
Level	Team	League	Manager
AAA	Salt Lake City Angels	Pacific Coast League	Les Moss
AA	El Paso Sun Kings	Texas League	Norm Sherry and Moose Stubing
A	Salinas Packers	California League	Jim Saul
A	Quad Cities Angels	Midwest League	Dick Kinaman
Rookie	Idaho Falls Angels	Pioneer League	Bob Clear

Records
Preceded by 1972	California Angels seasons 1973	Succeeded by 1974
