= List of Los Angeles Angels minor league affiliates =

Current Los Angeles Angels domestic minor league affiliate locations

The Los Angeles Angels farm system consists of six Minor League Baseball affiliates across the United States and in the Dominican Republic. Four teams are independently owned, while two—the Arizona Complex League Angels and Dominican Summer League Angels—are owned by the major league club.

The Angels have been affiliated with the Triple-A Salt Lake Bees of the Pacific Coast League since 2001, making it the longest-running active affiliation in the organization among teams not owned by the Angels. The longest affiliation in team history was the 25-year relationship with the Midwest League's Quad City Angels/Quad Cities River Bandits from 1963 to 1978 and 1985 to 1992. Their newest affiliate is the Rancho Cucamonga Quakes of the California League, which will become the Angels' Single-A club in 2021.

Geographically, Los Angeles' closest domestic affiliate is the Rancho Cucamonga Quakes of the California League, which are approximately 28 miles (45 km) away. Los Angeles' furthest domestic affiliate is the Double-A Rocket City Trash Pandas of the Southern League some 1,774 miles (2,855 km) away.

== Current affiliates ==
The Los Angeles Angels farm system consists of six minor league affiliates.

Class	Team	League	Location	Ballpark	Affiliated
Triple-A	Salt Lake Bees	Pacific Coast League	South Jordan, Utah	Daybreak Field at America First Square	2001
Double-A	Rocket City Trash Pandas	Southern League	Madison, Alabama	Toyota Field	2020
High-A	Tri-City Dust Devils	Northwest League	Pasco, Washington	Gesa Stadium	2021
Single-A	Rancho Cucamonga Quakes	California League	Rancho Cucamonga, California	LoanMart Field	2026
Rookie	ACL Angels	Arizona Complex League	Tempe, Arizona	Tempe Diablo Stadium	2001
Rookie	DSL Angels	Dominican Summer League	Boca Chica, Santo Domingo	Academia de Abel Garcia	1999

== Past affiliates ==
=== Key ===
Season	Each year is linked to an article about that particular Angels season.

=== 1961–1962 ===
Minor League Baseball operated with six classes (Triple-A, Double-A, Class A, Class B, Class C, and Class D) from 1961 to 1962.

Season	Triple-A	Double-A	Class A	Class B	Class C	Class D	Ref.
1961	Dallas-Fort Worth Rangers	—	—	—	—	Statesville Owls	
1962	Dallas-Fort Worth Rangers; Hawaii Islanders	—	—	—	San Jose Bees	Quad City Angels	

=== 1963–1989 ===
Prior to the 1963 season, Major League Baseball (MLB) initiated a reorganization of Minor League Baseball that resulted in a reduction from six classes to four (Triple-A, Double-A, Class A, and Rookie) in response to the general decline of the minors throughout the 1950s and early-1960s when leagues and teams folded due to shrinking attendance caused by baseball fans' preference for staying at home to watch MLB games on television. The only change made within the next 27 years was Class A being subdivided for the first time to form Class A Short Season in 1966.

Season	Triple-A	Double-A	Class A	Class A Short Season	Rookie	Ref(s).
1963	Hawaii Islanders	Nashville Volunteers	Quad City Angels; San Jose Bees; Tri-City Angels	—	—	
1964	Hawaii Islanders	—	Quad City Angels; San Jose Bees; Tri-City Angels	—	Idaho Falls Angels	
1965	Seattle Angels	El Paso Sun Kings	Quad City Angels; San Jose Bees	—	Idaho Falls Angels	
1966	Seattle Angels	El Paso Sun Kings	Quad City Angels; San Jose Bees	—	Idaho Falls Angels	
1967	Seattle Angels	El Paso Sun Kings	Quad City Angels; San Jose Bees	—	Idaho Falls Angels	
1968	Seattle Angels	El Paso Sun Kings	Quad City Angels; San Jose Bees	—	Idaho Falls Angels	
1969	Hawaii Islanders	El Paso Sun Kings	Quad City Angels; San Jose Bees	—	Idaho Falls Angels	
1970	Hawaii Islanders	El Paso Sun Kings	Quad City Angels	Bend Rainbows	Idaho Falls Angels	
1971	Salt Lake City Angels	Shreveport Captains	Quad City Angels	Bend Rainbows	Idaho Falls Angels	
1972	Salt Lake City Angels	Shreveport Captains	Quad City Angels; Stockton Ports	—	Idaho Falls Angels	
1973	Salt Lake City Angels	El Paso Sun Kings	Quad City Angels; Salinas Packers	—	Idaho Falls Angels	
1974	Salt Lake City Angels	El Paso Diablos	Quad City Angels; Salinas Packers	—	Idaho Falls Angels	
1975	Salt Lake City Gulls	El Paso Diablos	Quad City Angels; Salinas Packers	—	Idaho Falls Angels	
1976	Salt Lake City Gulls	El Paso Diablos	Quad City Angels; Salinas Angels	—	Idaho Falls Angels	
1977	Salt Lake City Gulls	El Paso Diablos	Quad City Angels; Salinas Angels	—	Idaho Falls Angels	
1978	Salt Lake City Gulls	El Paso Diablos	Quad City Angels; Salinas Angels	—	Idaho Falls Angels	
1979	Salt Lake City Gulls	El Paso Diablos	Salinas Angels	—	Idaho Falls Angels	
1980	Salt Lake City Gulls	El Paso Diablos	Salinas Angels	—	Idaho Falls Angels	
1981	Salt Lake City Gulls	Holyoke Millers	Redwood Pioneers	Salem Senators	Idaho Falls Angels	
1982	Spokane Indians	Holyoke Millers	Danville Suns; Redwood Pioneers	Salem Angels	—	
1983	Edmonton Trappers	Nashua Angels	Peoria Suns; Redwood Pioneers	Salem Angels	—	
1984	Edmonton Trappers	Waterbury Angels	Peoria Chiefs; Redwood Pioneers	Salem Angels	—	
1985	Edmonton Trappers	Midland Angels	Quad City Angels; Redwood Pioneers	Salem Angels	—	
1986	Edmonton Trappers	Midland Angels	Palm Springs Angels; Quad City Angels	Salem Angels	—	
1987	Edmonton Trappers	Midland Angels	Palm Springs Angels; Quad City Angels	Salem Angels	—	
1988	Edmonton Trappers	Midland Angels	Palm Springs Angels; Quad City Angels	Bend Bucks	—	
1989	Edmonton Trappers	Midland Angels	Palm Springs Angels; Quad City Angels	Bend Bucks	AZL Angels; DSL Angels	

=== 1990–2020 ===
Minor League Baseball operated with six classes from 1990 to 2020. In 1990, the Class A level was subdivided for a second time with the creation of Class A-Advanced. The Rookie level consisted of domestic and foreign circuits.

Season	Triple-A	Double-A	Class A-Advanced	Class A	Class A Short Season	Rookie	Foreign Rookie	Ref(s).
1990	Edmonton Trappers	Midland Angels	Palm Springs Angels	Quad City Angels	Boise Hawks	AZL Angels	DSL Angels	
1991	Edmonton Trappers	Midland Angels	Palm Springs Angels	Quad City Angels	Boise Hawks	AZL Angels	DSL Angels/Dodgers/Padres	
1992	Edmonton Trappers	Midland Angels	Palm Springs Angels	Quad Cities River Bandits	Boise Hawks	AZL Angels	DSL Angels	
1993	Vancouver Canadians	Midland Angels	Palm Springs Angels	Cedar Rapids Kernels	Boise Hawks	AZL Angels	DSL Angels; DSL Angels/Dodgers	
1994	Vancouver Canadians	Midland Angels	Lake Elsinore Storm	Cedar Rapids Kernels	Boise Hawks	AZL Angels	DSL Angels	
1995	Vancouver Canadians	Midland Angels	Lake Elsinore Storm	Cedar Rapids Kernels	Boise Hawks	AZL Angels	DSL Angels	
1996	Vancouver Canadians	Midland Angels	Lake Elsinore Storm	Cedar Rapids Kernels	Boise Hawks	AZL Angels	DSL Angels/Devil Rays	
1997	Vancouver Canadians	Midland Angels	Lake Elsinore Storm	Cedar Rapids Kernels	Boise Hawks	Butte Copper Kings	—	
1998	Vancouver Canadians	Midland Angels	Lake Elsinore Storm	Cedar Rapids Kernels	Boise Hawks	Butte Copper Kings	DSL Angels/White Sox	
1999	Edmonton Trappers	Erie SeaWolves	Lake Elsinore Storm	Cedar Rapids Kernels	Boise Hawks	Butte Copper Kings	DSL Angels	
2000	Edmonton Trappers	Erie SeaWolves	Lake Elsinore Storm	Cedar Rapids Kernels	Boise Hawks	Butte Copper Kings	DSL Angels	
2001	Salt Lake Stingers	Arkansas Travelers	Rancho Cucamonga Quakes	Cedar Rapids Kernels	—	Provo Angels; AZL Angels	DSL Angels	
2002	Salt Lake Stingers	Arkansas Travelers	Rancho Cucamonga Quakes	Cedar Rapids Kernels	—	Provo Angels; AZL Angels	DSL Angels	
2003	Salt Lake Stingers	Arkansas Travelers	Rancho Cucamonga Quakes	Cedar Rapids Kernels	—	Provo Angels; AZL Angels	DSL Angels	
2004	Salt Lake Stingers	Arkansas Travelers	Rancho Cucamonga Quakes	Cedar Rapids Kernels	—	Provo Angels; AZL Angels	DSL Angels	
2005	Salt Lake Stingers	Arkansas Travelers	Rancho Cucamonga Quakes	Cedar Rapids Kernels	—	Orem Owlz; AZL Angels	DSL Angels	
2006	Salt Lake Bees	Arkansas Travelers	Rancho Cucamonga Quakes	Cedar Rapids Kernels	—	Orem Owlz; AZL Angels	DSL Angels	
2007	Salt Lake Bees	Arkansas Travelers	Rancho Cucamonga Quakes	Cedar Rapids Kernels	—	Orem Owlz; AZL Angels	DSL Angels	
2008	Salt Lake Bees	Arkansas Travelers	Rancho Cucamonga Quakes	Cedar Rapids Kernels	—	Orem Owlz; AZL Angels	DSL Angels	
2009	Salt Lake Bees	Arkansas Travelers	Rancho Cucamonga Quakes	Cedar Rapids Kernels	—	Orem Owlz; AZL Angels	DSL Angels	
2010	Salt Lake Bees	Arkansas Travelers	Rancho Cucamonga Quakes	Cedar Rapids Kernels	—	Orem Owlz; AZL Angels	DSL Angels	
2011	Salt Lake Bees	Arkansas Travelers	Inland Empire 66ers	Cedar Rapids Kernels	—	Orem Owlz; AZL Angels	DSL Angels	
2012	Salt Lake Bees	Arkansas Travelers	Inland Empire 66ers	Cedar Rapids Kernels	—	Orem Owlz; AZL Angels	DSL Angels	
2013	Salt Lake Bees	Arkansas Travelers	Inland Empire 66ers	Burlington Bees	—	Orem Owlz; AZL Angels	DSL Angels	
2014	Salt Lake Bees	Arkansas Travelers	Inland Empire 66ers	Burlington Bees	—	Orem Owlz; AZL Angels	DSL Angels	
2015	Salt Lake Bees	Arkansas Travelers	Inland Empire 66ers	Burlington Bees	—	Orem Owlz; AZL Angels	DSL Angels	
2016	Salt Lake Bees	Arkansas Travelers	Inland Empire 66ers	Burlington Bees	—	Orem Owlz; AZL Angels	DSL Angels	
2017	Salt Lake Bees	Mobile BayBears	Inland Empire 66ers	Burlington Bees	—	Orem Owlz; AZL Angels	DSL Angels	
2018	Salt Lake Bees	Mobile BayBears	Inland Empire 66ers	Burlington Bees	—	Orem Owlz; AZL Angels	DSL Angels	
2019	Salt Lake Bees	Mobile BayBears	Inland Empire 66ers	Burlington Bees	—	Orem Owlz; AZL Angels	DSL Angels	
2020 (Note: The 2020 Minor League Baseball season was cancelled due to the COVID-19 pandemic.)	Salt Lake Bees	Rocket City Trash Pandas	Inland Empire 66ers	Burlington Bees	—	Orem Owlz; AZL Angels	DSL Angels	

=== 2021–present ===
The current structure of Minor League Baseball is the result of an overall contraction of the system beginning with the 2021 season. Class A was reduced to two levels: High-A and Low-A. Low-A was reclassified as Single-A in 2022.

Season	Triple-A	Double-A	High-A	Single-A	Rookie	Foreign Rookie	Ref.
2021	Salt Lake Bees	Rocket City Trash Pandas	Tri-City Dust Devils	Inland Empire 66ers	ACL Angels	DSL Angels	
2022	Salt Lake Bees	Rocket City Trash Pandas	Tri-City Dust Devils	Inland Empire 66ers	ACL Angels	DSL Angels	
2023	Salt Lake Bees	Rocket City Trash Pandas	Tri-City Dust Devils	Inland Empire 66ers	ACL Angels	DSL Angels	
2024	Salt Lake Bees	Rocket City Trash Pandas	Tri-City Dust Devils	Inland Empire 66ers	ACL Angels	DSL Angels	
2025	Salt Lake Bees	Rocket City Trash Pandas	Tri-City Dust Devils	Inland Empire 66ers	ACL Angels	DSL Angels	
2026	Salt Lake Bees	Rocket City Trash Pandas	Tri-City Dust Devils	Rancho Cucamonga Quakes	ACL Angels	DSL Angels	
