= Luis Quintana =

Luis Quintana may refer to:

- Luis Quintana (baseball) (1951-2009), Puerto Rican baseball player
- Luis A. Quintana (born 1960), American politician
- Luis Quintana (footballer) (born 1992), Mexican footballer
