= Joe Azcue =

Cuban baseball player (born 1939)

- Catcher
- Born: August 18, 1939 (age 86); Cienfuegos, Cuba
- Batted: Right Threw: Right

MLB debut
- August 3, 1960, for the Cincinnati Reds

Last MLB appearance
- September 29, 1972, for the Milwaukee Brewers

MLB statistics
- Batting average: .252
- Home runs: 50
- Runs batted in: 304
- Stats at Baseball Reference

Teams
- Cincinnati Reds (1960); Kansas City Athletics (1962–1963); Cleveland Indians (1963–1969); Boston Red Sox (1969); California Angels (1969–1970, 1972); Milwaukee Brewers (1972)

Career highlights and awards
- All-Star (1968)

José Joaquín Azcue López (born August 18, 1939) is a Cuban former professional baseball player and manager. He played in Major League Baseball as a catcher, most prominently as a member of the Cleveland Indians where he played the bulk of his career and was named to the 1968 American League All-Star team. He also played for the Cincinnati Reds, Kansas City Athletics, Boston Red Sox, California Angels and Milwaukee Brewers. Nicknamed "The Immortal Azcue", he was known for his strong throwing arm.

== Playing career ==
Azcue threw and batted right-handed; he was listed as 6 feet (1.8 m) tall and 190 pounds (86 kg). He began his career when he was signed by the Cincinnati Redlegs as an amateur free agent in 1956. He spent the following few years rising up the minor league ranks. He was part of the Cienfuegos Elephants of the Cuban League, and was part of their championship team, winning both the Cuban League title and the Caribbean Series during the 1959–1960 season.

He made his major league debut on August 3, 1960 at the age of 20. However, he finished the season with a batting average of only .097, and was sent back to the minor leagues at the end of the season. He played in the Cuban League for Cienfuegos again during the offseason, and on December 20, 1960, he was purchased by the Milwaukee Braves.

After a season in the minors, Milwaukee traded Azcue to the Kansas City Athletics on December 15, 1961 along with Ed Charles and Manny Jiménez for Bob Shaw and Lou Klimchock. In 1962 he played in 72 games for the Athletics. After two games with the Athletics in 1963, he was traded to the Cleveland Indians with Dick Howser for Doc Edwards and $100,000. He spent parts of seven seasons in Cleveland, and had the best seasons of his career there, earning his only All-Star appearance in 1968.

Azcue hit into the first unassisted triple play since 1927 on July 29, 1968, turned by Ron Hansen of Washington. After an early season trade in 1969, Azcue became a bit of a nomad. He was dealt along with Sonny Siebert and Vicente Romo from the Indians to the Boston Red Sox for Ken Harrelson, Dick Ellsworth and Juan Pizarro on April 19, 1969. Only two months later, Azcue had a falling out with Red Sox manager Dick Williams and was again traded, this time to the California Angels.

Azcue played the rest of the 1969 season and all of 1970 for the Angels. Then, unhappy with the contract he was offered by California, Azcue sat out the entire 1971 season. Azcue came back to play for the Angels in 1972 but was traded to the Milwaukee Brewers after playing in only three games. The Brewers sent Azcue to the minor leagues for most of the season. Azcue played in just 11 games for Milwaukee and after 1972 would never play again in the Major Leagues, retiring at the age of 32.

== Career statistics ==
In an eleven-year major league career, Azcue played in 909 games, accumulating 712 hits in 2,828 at bats for a .252 career batting average along with 50 home runs, 304 runs batted in and an on-base percentage of .304. A capable defensive catcher, Azcue led American League catchers in fielding percentage in 1967 and 1968. His .992 career fielding percentage was second only to Elston Howard among major league catchers at the time of his retirement. Over his career, Azcue threw out 45.17% of the base runners who tried steal a base on him, ranking him 10th on the all-time list. During the 1966 season, he threw out 62% of the base runners who tried steal a base, the fifth highest season percentage in major league history. He caught two no hitters in his career, Sonny Siebert in 1966 and Clyde Wright in 1970.

== Minor league managing ==
In 1974, he managed the Reno Silver Sox in the Class-A California League.
