= Carlos Velázquez (baseball) =

Puerto Rican baseball player (1948–2000)

- Pitcher
- Born: March 22, 1948; Loiza, Puerto Rico
- Died: March 16, 2000 (aged 51); Loiza, Puerto Rico
- Batted: Right Threw: Right

MLB debut
- July 20, 1973, for the Milwaukee Brewers

Last MLB appearance
- September 29, 1973, for the Milwaukee Brewers

MLB statistics
- Record: 2-2
- Earned run average: 2.58
- Saves: 2
- Games pitched: 18
- Stats at Baseball Reference

Teams
- Milwaukee Brewers (1973)

Carlos Quiñones Velázquez [″Carlín″] (March 22, 1948 – March 16, 2000) was a Puerto Rican relief pitcher in Major League Baseball. Listed at 5' 11", 180 lb., he batted and threw right handed.

Born in Loiza, Puerto Rico, Velázquez joined the Milwaukee Brewers of the American League during the 1973 midseason. He posted a 2–2 record and saved two games in his brief majors stint. He also pitched eight Minor league seasons from 1969 through 1976, going 46–48 with a 2.69 earned run average in 301 appearances.

Velázquez died in his hometown of Loiza at the age of 51.

== See also ==
- List of Major League Baseball players from Puerto Rico
