= Ray Newman (baseball) =

American baseball player (born 1945)

- Pitcher
- Born: June 20, 1945; Evansville, Indiana, U.S.
- Died: May 5, 2023 (aged 77); Fort Myers, Florida, U.S.
- Batted: Left Threw: Left

MLB debut
- May 16, 1971, for the Chicago Cubs

Last MLB appearance
- May 24, 1973, for the Milwaukee Brewers

MLB statistics
- Win–loss record: 3–3
- Earned run average: 2.97
- Strikeouts: 46
- Stats at Baseball Reference

Teams
- Chicago Cubs (1971); Milwaukee Brewers (1972–1973)

Raymond Francis Newman (June 20, 1945 – May 5, 2023) was an American former Major League Baseball left-handed pitcher for the Chicago Cubs in 1971 and the Milwaukee Brewers in 1972 to 1973.

He saw limited action in his brief career, usually as a reliever. He became known for riding a bicycle to Wrigley Field. On one occasion, he was struck by a driver and was unable to pitch that day due to the mishap. Cubs manager Leo Durocher was not amused, and Newman was traded by the next spring. Durocher, talking about his team that year, referred to "this nut who used to ride a bicycle to the ballpark."

Newman was traded from the Brewers to the Detroit Tigers for Mike Strahler at the Winter Meetings on December 6, 1973.

Newman died on May 5, 2023.
