= Ken Brett =

American baseball player (1948–2003)

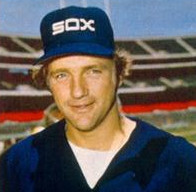
- Pitcher
- Born: September 18, 1948; Brooklyn, New York, U.S.
- Died: November 18, 2003 (aged 55); Spokane, Washington, U.S.
- Batted: Left Threw: Left

MLB debut
- September 27, 1967, for the Boston Red Sox

Last MLB appearance
- October 3, 1981, for the Kansas City Royals

MLB statistics
- Win–loss record: 83–85
- Earned run average: 3.93
- Strikeouts: 807
- Stats at Baseball Reference

Teams
- Boston Red Sox (1967, 1969–1971); Milwaukee Brewers (1972); Philadelphia Phillies (1973); Pittsburgh Pirates (1974–1975); New York Yankees (1976); Chicago White Sox (1976–1977); California Angels (1977–1978); Minnesota Twins (1979); Los Angeles Dodgers (1979); Kansas City Royals (1980–1981)

Career highlights and awards
- All-Star (1974)

Kenneth Alven Brett (September 18, 1948 – November 18, 2003) was an American professional baseball pitcher who played in Major League Baseball for the Boston Red Sox, Milwaukee Brewers, Philadelphia Phillies, Pittsburgh Pirates, New York Yankees, Chicago White Sox, California Angels, Minnesota Twins, Los Angeles Dodgers, and Kansas City Royals from 1967 to 1981. He was the second of four Brett brothers who played professional baseball, the most notable being the youngest, George Brett. Ken played for ten teams in his 14-year MLB career.

== Early life ==
Born in Brooklyn, Brett grew up in El Segundo, a suburb of Los Angeles just south of Los Angeles International Airport.

The Boston Red Sox selected Brett out of El Segundo High School at age 17 with the fourth overall pick in the 1966 Major League Baseball draft. He was selected as a pitcher; other MLB teams projected him as an outfielder.

== Major League Baseball career ==
=== 1967 World Series ===
Fifteen months later, he was called up to the major leagues from Single-A ball, he participated in the final week of a heated American League pennant race in September 1967. Boston won the league title by defeating the Minnesota Twins on the final day of the season, finishing a single game ahead of both Detroit and Minnesota, and three games ahead of Chicago. Brett was not expected to be on the World Series roster to face the St. Louis Cardinals, but was added as an emergency injury replacement for Sparky Lyle, a transaction requiring the commissioner's approval.

Days later on October 8, Brett became the youngest pitcher ever in the World Series, appearing in relief in Game 4. He pitched a scoreless eighth inning, yielding a walk. In Game 7, he entered the game with the bases loaded in the top of the ninth inning and induced Tim McCarver to ground out to the first baseman to end the threat. At just 19 years and three weeks, he gave up no hits in 1 1/3 scoreless innings in his two appearances.

"Nothing ever fazed him. We had no hesitation about putting him on the World Series roster, none at all," recalled Dick Williams, Boston's rookie manager that year. "He had the guts of a burglar."

=== 1968–81 ===
Shortly after that World Series, Brett spent six months in the Army Reserve and missed spring training in 1968. In his first Triple-A outing back (for Louisville), he was left in for nine innings and developed arm trouble; he endured a couple of surgeries, and his career never lived up to early expectations. He would later state that the worst curse in life is unlimited potential.

Brett was traded in consecutive years, after the 1971 and 1972 seasons. The former was part of a ten-player blockbuster that sent him, George Scott, Jim Lonborg, Billy Conigliaro, Joe Lahoud, and Don Pavletich to the Milwaukee Brewers for Tommy Harper, Marty Pattin, Lew Krausse, and minor-league outfielder Pat Skrable on October 10, 1971. Then, both Brett and Lonborg, along with Ken Sanders and Earl Stephenson, were dealt to the Philadelphia Phillies for Don Money, John Vukovich, and Bill Champion on October 31, 1972. While with the Phillies in 1973, he gave up Hank Aaron's 700th home run on July 21 in Atlanta. "I won the game, so it didn't matter that much to me," Brett said. "Aaron gave me an autographed picture the next day, and I stood there and tore it up in mock anger. I always took the game seriously, but I also had a good time playing it."

Although a much-traveled pitcher who played for ten MLB teams over a 14-year career, Brett did have remarkable career moments. He was the winning pitcher of the 1974 All-Star Game, as the only member of the host team Pittsburgh Pirates on the National League squad. Earlier that year on May 27, Brett held the San Diego Padres off base with a perfect game into the ninth inning before settling for a two-hit shutout win in the first game of a Memorial Day doubleheader, in which he also had a hit and batted in a run. In the second game, he had a pinch-hit triple to spark a five-run seventh to help the Pirates sweep.

Brett was traded with Willie Randolph and Dock Ellis from the Pirates to the New York Yankees for Doc Medich on December 11, 1975. His stay was brief, traded in mid-May (with Rich Coggins) to the Chicago White Sox for Carlos May. A week later on May 26, 1976, he had a no-hitter going for the White Sox with two out in the ninth in a scoreless game at California Angels. Jerry Remy's slow roller down the third base line was allowed to roll unplayed by Jorge Orta and amid some controversy, was scored a hit rather than an error. Brett pitched ten innings and won the game 1–0, in eleven innings.

Throughout his career, Brett was best known as an outstanding hitting pitcher, perhaps the best of his era. In 347 career at bats, he recorded 91 hits (29 for extra bases), yielding a .262 batting average and slugged an impressive .406. He hit 18 doubles, 1 triple, and 10 home runs with 44 runs batted in. While with the Phillies in 1973, he hit a home run in four consecutive pitching starts (from June 9 to June 23). In his All-Star year of 1974 with the Pirates, he hit a remarkable .310 (27 for 87), appearing in 43 games (27 as a starting pitcher and 16 as a pinch hitter). His .310 batting average was higher than six of the eight starting position players on the Pirates in 1974, a team that won the National League East division title. "I took a lot of pride in my ability to hit," he said. "In high school, I was also an outfielder and a pretty good hitter. I always thought my being able to hit helped me in games, and I pinch-hit a lot for pitchers, although there were a couple times in Pittsburgh when I hit for Kurt Bevacqua (a utility player). He didn't like that much. I never took extra batting practice or anything like that. On days when I pitched, I'd get my swing in during batting practice." Dodgers manager Tommy Lasorda was an admirer of Brett's hitting ability and once remarked that "if we'd drafted him, we'd have put him in center field and he'd have stayed there."

Following the 1975 season, Brett played primarily for teams in the American League, which had instituted the designated hitter in 1973. This significantly limited his at-bats in the second half of his career, not only as a starting pitcher, but also as a pinch hitter. In 1976, Brett was used as a pinch hitter twelve times for the White Sox, more than any other pitcher in the American League. In 1978 with the California Angels, Brett transitioned to relief pitching.

In 1979, Brett returned to the National League as a reliever with the Los Angeles Dodgers. At the end of his career, Brett and his youngest brother George were teammates on the Kansas City Royals. Ken was added to the Royals roster in August 1980, the year the Royals finally won the American League pennant and George hit .390 and was the AL MVP; the Royals fell to the Philadelphia Phillies in six games in the World Series.

Brett was released by the Royals following the 1981 season and retired from baseball shortly thereafter. He had a career record of 83–85, with an earned run average of 3.93 in 349 games, with 184 starts and 51 complete games.

Brett played for ten major league teams, but in his nine team changes he was traded a mere six times, and released the last three. "I'll never forget the first time he came on in relief for the Royals," George recalled. "The bullpen was out in right field and they opened up the gate, and he came running in like an airplane -- arms spread out like wings, banking left, banking right, banking left and banking right. I'm on the mound with Jim Frey, our manager, and Jamie Quirk, who I'd played with for years and was Ken's dear friend. And I looked at Jamie and he looked at me, and I said, 'Now I know why he's been traded ten times.'"

Brett wore his frequent change of uniforms as both a badge of honor and humor. In a commercial for Miller Lite beer in 1984, he raised a glass in a salute to the town he thought he was in, only to be told he was not in that town. He spun through his mental rolodex and named every major and minor league town he could think of; the punchline – "Utica?" – led to an invitation to the city by the mayor, and then a minor league manager's job with the Utica Blue Sox.

Baseball author Bill James wrote that Brett was the best hitting pitcher of the 1970s.

== Post-playing career ==
After a year as a minor league manager in Utica in 1985, Brett worked as a broadcaster for the Seattle Mariners in 1986, then the California Angels for the next eight years. He then coached baseball at the collegiate level and co-owned minor league baseball and hockey teams and a sporting goods company in Spokane, his home since 1998, with his brothers John, Bobby, and George.

Brett, along with his brother, All-Stars Steve Garvey, Fred Lynn, Ellis Valentine, and Dodgers manager Tommy Lasorda made guest appearances in an episode of ABC's Fantasy Island (Season 1, Episode 8, "Superstar/Salem"). Aired in March 1978, all of the players had at least one speaking line. As an inside joke between brothers, George Brett was embarrassed twice in the episode - once by booting a routine grounder and a second time by being struck out by a non-athlete (Gary Burghoff) who was there fulfilling his fantasy. George has since said that Ken pointed out he would be the perfect "fool" for those moments.

== Personal life ==
Brett and his wife, Teresa, had two children.

After a six-year battle with brain cancer, which included two operations, Brett died at age 55 on November 18, 2003, in Spokane. He was the third member of the 1981 Royals team to succumb to brain cancer, following manager Dick Howser in 1987 and relief pitcher Dan Quisenberry in 1998.
