= John Doherty (first baseman) =

American baseball player (born 1951)

- First baseman
- Born: August 22, 1951 (age 74); Woburn, Massachusetts, U.S.
- Batted: Left Threw: Left

MLB debut
- June 1, 1974, for the California Angels

Last MLB appearance
- July 30, 1975, for the California Angels

MLB statistics
- Batting average: .240
- Home runs: 4
- Runs batted in: 27
- Stats at Baseball Reference

Teams
- California Angels (1974–1975)

John Michael Doherty (born August 22, 1951) is an American former reserve first baseman/designated hitter in Major League Baseball who played for the California Angels between 1974 and 1975. Listed at 5 ft 11 in (1.80 m), 185 lb., he batted and threw left-handed.

Doherty attended Reading Memorial High School in Reading, MA. He was selected by the California Angels in the 1st round (7th overall) of the 1970 MLB January Draft-Secondary Phase.

In parts of two seasons, Doherty was a .240 hitter (76-for-317) with four home runs and 27 RBI in 104 games, including 27 runs, 17 doubles, one triple, and three stolen bases.

== Sources ==
- Baseball Reference
- The Baseball Cube
- Retrosheet
