= Skip Lockwood =

American baseball player (born 1946)

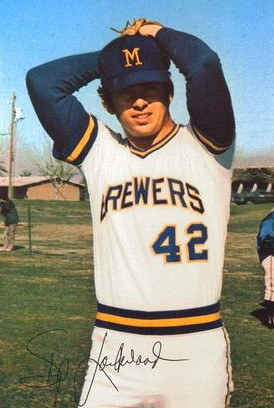
- Lockwood in 1973
- Pitcher / Third baseman
- Born: August 17, 1946 (age 80); Roslindale, Massachusetts, U.S.
- Batted: Right Threw: Right

MLB debut
- April 23, 1965, for the Kansas City Athletics

Last MLB appearance
- September 10, 1980, for the Boston Red Sox

MLB statistics
- Win–loss record: 57–97
- Earned run average: 3.55
- Strikeouts: 829
- Saves: 68
- Stats at Baseball Reference

Teams
- Kansas City Athletics (1965); Seattle Pilots / Milwaukee Brewers (1969–1973); California Angels (1974); New York Mets (1975–1979); Boston Red Sox (1980)

Claude Edward (Skip) Lockwood Jr. (born August 17, 1946) is an American former Major League Baseball pitcher. He pitched for the Seattle Pilots / Milwaukee Brewers (1969–1973), California Angels (1974), New York Mets (1975–1979) and Boston Red Sox (1980).

Lockwood was the last of the original Seattle Pilots to play for the Brewers, being traded to the California Angels prior to the 1974 season.

== Baseball career ==
=== Third base ===
Lockwood attended Catholic Memorial High School in West Roxbury, Massachusetts, where he earned 14 varsity letters in four years. His school record time in the 100-yard dash in 1964 still stands. Lockwood was a third baseman when he signed with the Kansas City Athletics out of high school in 1964 as an amateur free agent. The scout representing the Athletics came to the Lockwood home with a $35,000 contract. Lockwood said that he needed to make one change before signing, and added a "1" in front of the contract amount, changing the number to $135,000. The scout was nervous and asked to use the Lockwood's phone to call Athletics' owner Charlie Finley. Finley spoke to Lockwood directly, asking why he should give Lockwood the money. "Because I'll make you a winner," said Lockwood. The scout went back on the phone, and Finley approved the higher amount.

Despite batting only .208 with the Burlington Bees, he showed decent power with five home runs in 236 at bats, and was brought up to the majors for the 1965 season. With the A's, he batted only .121 with eleven strikeouts in 33 at bats, and was back in the minor leagues the next two seasons. Lockwood could hit fastballs, but struggled with breaking balls.

=== Pitcher ===
On November 28, 1967, Lockwood was drafted by the Houston Astros in the 1967 Rule 5 draft, but, following spring training, he was returned to his original club, which had moved to Oakland. Upon his return to the Athletics organization, Lockwood was converted to a pitcher despite having only pitched one inning, with the Modesto Reds in 1966. On October 15, 1968, he was selected by the Seattle Pilots in the 1968 expansion draft. During their first and only season, Lockwood made his major league debut on the mound with the Pilots, going 0–1 with a 3.52 earned run average in six games (three starts).

Lockwood spent the next four years with the franchise following their move to Milwaukee, and spent most of his time with the Brewers as a starting pitcher. In his final season in Milwaukee, 1973, he made 22 of his 37 appearances out of the bullpen. Up to that point, he had only made seven appearances in relief.

=== Relief pitcher ===
Lockwood was involved in a nine-player transaction when he was sent along with Ellie Rodríguez, Ollie Brown, Joe Lahoud and Gary Ryerson from the Brewers to the Angels for Steve Barber, Clyde Wright, Ken Berry, Art Kusnyer and cash on October 23, 1973. He was used almost exclusively as a reliever by the Angels (35 relief appearances, two starts). With the Angels, he earned his first save. After a 2–5 season, he was dealt from the Angels to the New York Yankees for Bill Sudakis at the Winter Meetings on December 3, 1974.

In 1975, Lockwood joined the New York Mets, with whom he blossomed as a reliever. In 1976 and 1977, Lockwood earned 19 and 20 saves, respectively, and established a Mets season record for games pitched in 1977 with 63. According to the Mets blog, Amazin' Avenue, Lockwood was in 2007 the forty-second best player in Mets history. Unfortunately, Lockwood played for the Mets during one of the darker times in franchise history (98, 96 and 99 losses in 1977, 1978 and 1979, respectively).

He signed with the Boston Red Sox for the 1980 season, going 3–1 with two saves and a 5.32 ERA in 24 games (one start). The following Spring, he was released by the Red Sox, and retired shortly afterwards. In twelve seasons, Lockwood's career stats are:

W	L	PCT	ERA	G	GS	GF	CG	SHO	SV	IP	H	ER	R	HR	BB	IBB	K	WP	HBP	Bk	BF	Fld%	Avg
57	97	.370	3.55	420	106	219	16	5	68	1236	1130	488	539	98	490	62	829	43	33	5	5215	.951	.154

== Outside baseball ==
Lockwood attended several universities in the months between his MLB seasons, including Merrimack College, Boston College, Bryant and Stratton Commercial School, Marquette University, and Carroll College. He finally graduated with a cum laude bachelor's degree from Emerson College in 1976, his eighth year in the majors. He has two master's degrees, one from Fairfield, and the other from MIT. He graduated from the Massachusetts Institute of Technology with an S.M. in 1983. He is one of the few MIT graduates who have played in Major League Baseball. Lockwood was also an accomplished candlepin bowler.

In 2018, Lockwood released a memoir titled Insight Pitch, which he wrote without using a ghostwriter.
