= Archie Reynolds =

American baseball player (born 1946)

- Pitcher
- Born: January 3, 1946 (age 80); Glendale, California, U.S.
- Batted: Right Threw: Right

MLB debut
- August 15, 1968, for the Chicago Cubs

Last MLB appearance
- August 4, 1972, for the Milwaukee Brewers

MLB statistics
- Win–loss record: 0-8
- Earned run average: 5.73
- Strikeouts: 47
- Stats at Baseball Reference

Teams
- Chicago Cubs (1968–1970); California Angels (1971); Milwaukee Brewers (1972)

Archie Edward Reynolds (born January 3, 1946) is an American former professional baseball pitcher. He appeared in 36 games over five seasons in Major League Baseball without earning a win. He had eight losses.

Reynolds was born in Glendale, California, but grew up in East Texas, and graduated from John Tyler High School in Tyler, Texas. After attending Paris Junior College in Paris, Texas, Reynolds was drafted by the Chicago Cubs in the 38th round of the 1966 Major League Baseball draft. He dominated Rookie ball, going 9–3 with a 2.13 earned run average for the Pioneer League's Treasure Valley Cubs to earn a promotion all the way to double A in 1967. He went 13–2 with a 2.19 ERA with the double A San Antonio Missions in 1968, and earned his first call to the major leagues that August. He appeared in seven games for the Cubs, and had a 6.75 ERA. His one loss was his only start against the San Francisco Giants on August 27.

For the most part, Reynolds spent all of 1969 assigned to Tacoma, making only two starts for the Cubs in the second game of doubleheaders on June 15 & 22. The Cubs won, and Reynolds left with a lead in his June 15 start against the Cincinnati Reds, however, after giving up a lead off home run to opposing pitcher Jim Maloney to start the fifth, followed by a hard single back to the mound by Pete Rose, Reynolds was pulled, and was ineligible for the decision.

Reynolds was 0–2 with a 6.60 ERA for the Cubs in 1970 when he was dealt to the California Angels for Juan Pizarro. He spent the rest of the season assigned to the Angels' Pacific Coast League affiliate, the Hawaii Islanders, where he went 7–3 with a 2.62 ERA. On May 26, 1972, he was traded to the Milwaukee Brewers for outfielder Curt Motton. He appeared in five games for the Brewers in 1972, spending most of the season and all of 1973 with the triple A Evansville Triplets. He returned to the Hawaii Islanders in 1974, now a San Diego Padres affiliate, where he was 1–4 in nine games.
