= John Vukovich =

American baseball player, coach, and manager (1947–2007)

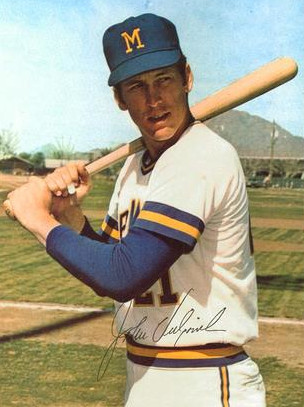
- Vukovich in 1973
- Infielder
- Born: July 31, 1947; Sacramento, California, U.S.
- Died: March 8, 2007 (aged 59); Philadelphia, Pennsylvania, U.S.
- Batted: Right Threw: Right

MLB debut
- September 11, 1970, for the Philadelphia Phillies

Last MLB appearance
- August 23, 1981, for the Philadelphia Phillies

MLB statistics
- Batting average: .161
- Home runs: 6
- Runs batted in: 44
- Stats at Baseball Reference
- Managerial record at Baseball Reference

Teams
- As player: Philadelphia Phillies (1970–1971); Milwaukee Brewers (1973–1974); Cincinnati Reds (1975); Philadelphia Phillies (1976–1981); As manager: Chicago Cubs (1986); Philadelphia Phillies (1987); As coach: Chicago Cubs (1982–1987); Philadelphia Phillies (1988–2004)

Career highlights and awards
- 2× World Series champion (1975, 1980); Philadelphia Phillies Wall of Fame

John Christopher Vukovich (July 31, 1947 – March 8, 2007), nicknamed "Vuk" or "Johnny Vuk", was an American professional baseball utility infielder, manager, and coach in Major League Baseball, best known for his years with the Philadelphia Phillies. He played in parts of ten seasons between 1970 and 1981 for the Phillies, Cincinnati Reds, and Milwaukee Brewers. Vukovich is also known for recording the lowest career MLB batting average (BA) (.161) of any non-pitcher with 500 or more at bats (AB).

== Personal life ==
Vukovich was of Serbian descent and was born in Sacramento, California, and grew up in Sutter Creek, California. His father was the baseball coach for the local Amador High School where Vukovich attended.

== Baseball career ==
=== Player ===
Vukovich was traded along with Don Money and Bill Champion by the Phillies to the Brewers for Jim Lonborg, Ken Brett, Ken Sanders and Earl Stephenson on October 31, 1972. He was a backup for the 1975 Reds World Series-winning team, although he was traded back to the Phillies before the playoffs began, and also for the 1980 Phillies World Series-winning team. He actually began the 1975 season as the Reds' starting third baseman, but was benched in early April after hitting only .250 with three extra base hits and only one RBI. The Reds moved Pete Rose to third base and platooned Dan Driessen and George Foster in left at first, but Foster eventually won the left-field job full time. Vukovich spent the remainder of his time with the Reds as a late-inning defensive replacement before being released in May 1975.

He batted above .200 only twice in his ten-year career, appearing in 277 games hitting 6 home runs, with 44 runs batted in, and a career .956 fielding percentage. His career batting average was .161, the lowest in Major League Baseball history for any batter (non-pitcher) with over 550 plate appearances.

During his second period of playing with the Phillies, he became beloved to the fans even though he seldom appeared in games; he was seen as a blue-collar player and the ordinary fan respected his effort.

=== Coaching ===
After his playing career ended, he joined the Chicago Cubs as a coach, and in 1986 he was manager for a day after Jim Frey was fired (he split that day's doubleheader). In 1987, he rejoined the Phillies, and after Lee Elia was fired with nine games to go, he took over as skipper, going 5-4 the rest of the season.

Vukovich stayed with the Phillies as a coach from 1988 to 2004, and was considered for the managing job when Terry Francona was fired in 2000. The job eventually went to Vukovich's childhood friend, Larry Bowa. Vukovich was diagnosed with a brain tumor early in the 2001 season and subsequently had surgery. He would return later that season, and remained on the coaching staff until being named special assistant to the General manager following the 2004 season. Along with Bowa and Milt Thompson, Vukovich is one of just three Phillies to go to the World Series as both a player and coach for the club.

== Death ==
In late 2006, he again exhibited symptoms similar to his previous tumor; he died at Thomas Jefferson University Hospital in Philadelphia at age 59. The 2007 Phillies honored him by wearing a uniform patch on their right sleeve with his nickname, "Vuk". At the time of his death Vukovich was a resident of Voorhees Township, New Jersey.
