= Curt Motton =

American baseball player (1940–2010)

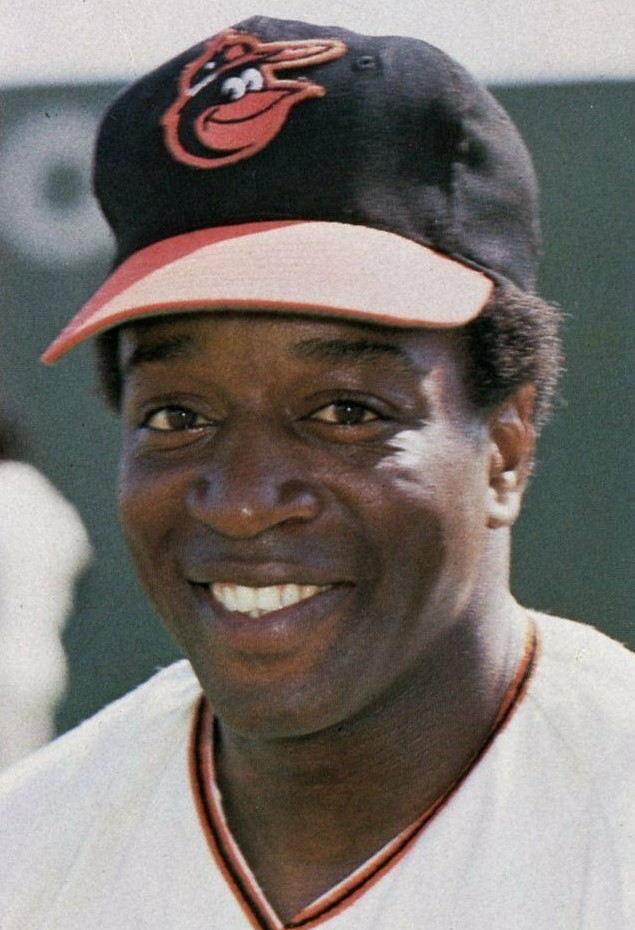
- Left fielder
- Born: September 24, 1940; Darnell, Louisiana, U.S.
- Died: January 21, 2010 (aged 69); Parkton, Maryland, U.S.
- Batted: Right Threw: Right

MLB debut
- July 5, 1967, for the Baltimore Orioles

Last MLB appearance
- October 2, 1974, for the Baltimore Orioles

MLB statistics
- Batting average: .213
- Home runs: 25
- Runs batted in: 80
- Stats at Baseball Reference

Teams
- Baltimore Orioles (1967–1971); Milwaukee Brewers (1972); California Angels (1972); Baltimore Orioles (1973–1974)

Career highlights and awards
- World Series champion (1970)

Curtell Howard Motton (/ˈmoʊtən/ MOH-tən; September 24, 1940 – January 21, 2010) was an American professional baseball player. He played in Major League Baseball as an outfielder from 1967 through 1974, most notably as a member of the Baltimore Orioles dynasty that won three consecutive American League pennants from 1969 to 1971 and, won the World Series in 1970. He also played for the Milwaukee Brewers and the California Angels.

Motton was known by the nickname "Cuz".

== Early life ==
Motton was born in Darnell, Louisiana on September 24, 1940 to Robert and Mary Lean (Coleman) Motton, the third of nine children. The family moved to Oakland, California when Motton was a young child, where Motton grew up.

Motton played baseball at Encinal High School in Alameda, California, the same school that produced Willie Stargell, Tommy Harper, Jimmy Rollins and Dontrelle Willis. Motton and Harper were named as outfielders on the 1958 Alameda County Southern Division All-Star Team, with Stargell named as the first baseman. Motton and Harper also played quarterback on the school's football team. Motton was also a sprinter on the track team. He completed his education at Santa Rosa Junior College and then transferred to the University of California, Berkeley (1959-1961).

== Minors ==
Motton signed as an amateur free agent by the Chicago Cubs on July 20, 1961. After only one full campaign with the St. Cloud Rox in 1962, in which he hit .291 with 13 home runs and 69 runs batted in, he was selected by the Orioles in the 1962 first-year draft. Both he and Paul Blair powered the offense of the Harry Dunlop-managed Stockton Ports when they won the 1963 California League Championship. Motton led the team in batting with a .333 average.

He spent the next 1 1/2 years away from the Orioles organization when he served in the United States Army at Fort Richardson. He managed to play organized baseball in 1964 with the Alaska Goldpanners of Fairbanks, which also featured Tom Seaver, Graig Nettles and Rick Monday. He returned to the Orioles' farm system in 1965, and made his major league debut during the 1967 season, when he was called up to the Orioles from the Rochester Red Wings on July 5, 1967.

In 1967, Motton played for the Orioles Triple-A affiliate Rochester Red Wings of the International League, and was named the International League Rookie of the Year. He hit .323, with 72 walks, 18 home runs, 83 runs scored, and 70 runs batted in (RBIs) for the Red Wings.

Between 1962 and 1974, Motton played for 7 different minor league teams, including all or part of 1966, 1967, 1973 and 1974 for the Red Wings.

== Baltimore Orioles ==
Motton saw the most playing time in his career in 1968 when he platooned in left field with Curt Blefary. For the season, he batted only .198 with eight home runs and 25 RBIs, however, perhaps as a sign of things to come, he set a record by hitting a pinch hit home run in consecutive pinch hit at-bats on May 15 and May 17.

In 1969, infielder Don Buford was converted into an outfielder, relegating Motton to pinch hitting duties. Motton shined in his new role, batting .303 with six home runs and 21 RBIs for the season. Perhaps his most memorable pinch hit at-bat came on October 5 against the Minnesota Twins in the 1969 American League Championship Series. With the score tied at zero in the eleventh inning, Motton singled in Boog Powell for the only run of the game.

Motton's personality was an important contribution to the team and the community. Hall of Fame Oriole pitcher Jim Palmer said of Motton, "'He would light up a room.'" In 1970, he and his wife moved into a mostly white apartment building in Woodlawn, Baltimore County, Maryland, and were known for their "infectiously kind, sensitive, and warm" natures in the community. On one occasion, a recently widowed neighbor called him late at night because a burglar was attempting to break into her apartment. In only his underwear, Motton grabbed a baseball bat and chased the would-be burglar from the building.

== Milwaukee Brewers and California Angels ==
Motton remained with the Orioles through 1971, winning a World Series with the team in 1970. Prior to the start of the 1972 season, Motton was traded to the Milwaukee Brewers for a player to be named later and cash. Expected to compete for one of the starting outfield jobs, he ended up being beaten out by John Briggs and Joe Lahoud. Motton was critical of manager Dave Bristol over his lack of playing time, and was traded to the California Angels for minor league pitcher Archie Reynolds just over a month into the season. He batted just .156 for his two clubs, and began the 1973 season assigned to the Angels' Triple-A affiliate, the Salt Lake City Angels. After batting just .152 in 28 games for Salt Lake, the Angels released Motton, and he returned to the Orioles. Motton appeared in just seven more games for the Orioles over the next two seasons.

== Death ==
Motton died after a long battle with stomach cancer at his home in Parkton, Maryland, on January 21, 2010. His wife Marti, a retired Baltimore County Police Officer, was by his side.

Preceded by Johnny Oates	Baltimore Orioles First Base coach 1991	Succeeded by Davey Lopes
