= Bill Parsons =

American baseball player (born 1948)

- Pitcher
- Born: August 17, 1948 (age 77); Riverside, California, U.S.
- Batted: Right Threw: Right

MLB debut
- April 13, 1971, for the Milwaukee Brewers

Last MLB appearance
- September 28, 1974, for the Oakland Athletics

MLB statistics
- Win–loss record: 29–36
- Earned run average: 3.89
- Strikeouts: 282
- Stats at Baseball Reference

Teams
- Milwaukee Brewers (1971–1973); Oakland Athletics (1974)

William Raymond Parsons (born August 17, 1948) is an American former professional baseball pitcher, who played four seasons in Major League Baseball (MLB), mostly with the Milwaukee Brewers.

== Baseball career ==
Born in Riverside, California, he attended Riverside Polytechnic High School. He grew to be 6 ft 6 in (1.98 m), 195 lb (88 kg), and threw right-handed. Parsons was drafted in the 7th round by the Seattle Pilots in 1968, and played in their minor league system before leaving in 1970.

He joined the Milwaukee Brewers in 1970, and was assigned to Portland of the Pacific Coast League, going 3–0 with a 2.25 ERA. Parsons played his first game in the major leagues on April 13, 1971. He was in the starting rotation for the last-place Brewers in his rookie season, going 13–17 with a 3.20 ERA, while 7th in the league with 4 shutouts and 8th in the AL with 93 walks. Parsons was second in the 1971 BBWAA Rookie of the Year voting, losing out to Chris Chambliss, and was named The Sporting News AL Rookie Pitcher of the Year.

He saw little game time for the remainder of his career. He was traded to the Oakland Athletics with cash for Deron Johnson in 1974. His contract was purchased by the St. Louis Cardinals from the Athletics at the Winter Meetings on December 2, 1974. In July 1975 he was traded by the Cardinals with cash to the White Sox for Buddy Bradford.
