= Luis Quintana (baseball) =

Puerto Rican baseball player (1951–2009)

- Relief pitcher
- Born: December 25, 1951; Vega Baja, Puerto Rico
- Died: July 27, 2009 (aged 57); West Palm Beach, Florida, U.S.
- Batted: Left Threw: Left

MLB debut
- July 9, 1974, for the California Angels

Last MLB appearance
- June 28, 1975, for the California Angels

MLB statistics
- Win–loss record: 2-3
- Strikeouts: 16
- Earned run average: 5.03
- Stats at Baseball Reference

Teams
- California Angels (1974–1975)

Luis Joaquín Quintana Santos (December 25, 1951 – July 27, 2009) was a Puerto Rican professional baseball player who played two seasons for the California Angels of Major League Baseball. Quintana was born in Vega Baja, Puerto Rico.

On July 27, 2009, Quintana was found dead in his car after a crash in West Palm Beach, Florida. Officials from the Palm Beach County sheriff's office indicated that Quintana had died of natural causes while driving. Quintana's family announced their intention to take his remains back to his hometown for burial at Cementerio Fuente de Luz Memorial Park in Vega Baja, Puerto Rico.
