= Ollie Brown (baseball) =

American baseball player (1944–2015)

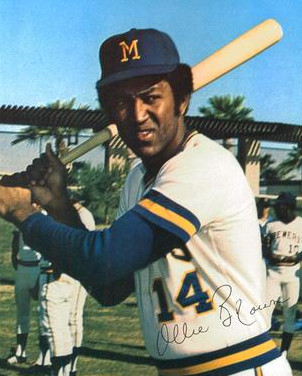
- Brown in 1973
- Outfielder
- Born: February 11, 1944; Tuscaloosa, Alabama, U.S.
- Died: April 16, 2015 (aged 71); Buena Park, California, U.S.
- Batted: Right Threw: Right

MLB debut
- September 10, 1965, for the San Francisco Giants

Last MLB appearance
- September 27, 1977, for the Philadelphia Phillies

MLB statistics
- Batting average: .265
- Home runs: 102
- Runs batted in: 454
- Stats at Baseball Reference

Teams
- San Francisco Giants (1965–1968); San Diego Padres (1969–1972); Oakland Athletics (1972); Milwaukee Brewers (1972–1973); Houston Astros (1974); Philadelphia Phillies (1974–1977)

Ollie Lee "Downtown" Brown (February 11, 1944 – April 16, 2015) was an American professional baseball outfielder who played in Major League Baseball (MLB) from 1965 to 1977. He began his big league career with the San Francisco Giants and was the first draft choice for the expansion San Diego Padres, in 1968. While with the Milwaukee Brewers in 1973, he was the first player to come to bat as a designated hitter after the rule was adopted by the American League that year.

After signing with the Giants, prior to the 1962 season, Brown split time as a starting pitcher and outfielder in Minor League Baseball (MiLB). He pitched a no-hitter on August 13, 1963, an 8-0 shutout, while playing for the Class A Decatur Commodores, San Francisco’s farm team, in the Midwest League.

In 1964, Brown was named Most Valuable Player (MVP) of the California League while playing for the Fresno Giants (the league champions that year, with an 86-53 record). That summer, he became a top prospect, hitting 40 home runs (HR), with 133 runs batted in (RBI), while posting a batting average (BA) of .329, and amassing a 1.083 on-base plus slugging (OPS) Sabermetric score.

Brown was involved in a nine-player transaction when he was sent along with Ellie Rodríguez, Joe Lahoud, Skip Lockwood and Gary Ryerson from the Milwaukee Brewers to the California Angels for Steve Barber, Clyde Wright, Ken Berry, Art Kusnyer and cash on October 23, 1973.

Brown was best known for his defensive skills, particularly the strength of his throwing arm. Before games, he entertained fans by throwing the baseball from the far right field corner to third base on the fly.

In 1221 games over 13 seasons, Brown posted a .265 batting average (964-for-3642) with 404 runs, 102 home runs, 454 RBI, 30 stolen bases, .324 on-base percentage and .394 slugging percentage. He recorded a .977 fielding percentage playing at all three outfield positions.

His older brother, Willie Brown, was a star football running back at the University of Southern California (USC) who went on to play with the Los Angeles Rams and Philadelphia Eagles of the National Football League (NFL). His younger brother, Oscar Brown, was an outfielder with the Atlanta Braves.

Brown died due to the effects of mesothelioma at the age of 71 on April 16, 2015, at his home in Buena Park.
