= Jim Walton (baseball) =

American Major League Baseball scout (1935–2023)

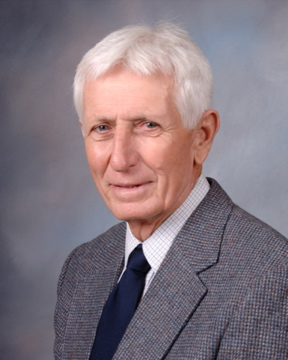
- Inducted into Texas Scouting Hall of Fame, 2007
- Coach
- Born: September 5, 1935; Shattuck, Oklahoma, U.S.
- Died: May 14, 2023 (aged 87); Shattuck, Oklahoma, U.S.
- Batted: Right Threw: Right
- Stats at Baseball Reference

Teams
- As coach: Milwaukee Brewers (1973–1975)

James Robert Walton (September 5, 1934 – May 14, 2023) was an American Major League Baseball scout, who served for three seasons (1973–1975) in MLB as the first base coach for the Milwaukee Brewers of the American League. Walton threw and batted right-handed, stood 6 feet 2 inches (1.88 m) tall and weighed 195 pounds (88 kg).

He played in the Baltimore Orioles, Washington Senators and Cincinnati Reds farm systems (1954–1955; 1959–1960), as an infielder, outfielder and pitcher. In 1961 he joined the Houston Colt .45s' organization as a minor league manager — one year before the Houston team debuted in MLB. He managed in the Georgia–Florida League in 1962–1963, filling in as an active player during the 1962 season. He then scouted for Colt .45s/Astros through 1971, when he moved to the Brewers as a scout and interim manager at the Double-A level, with the 1972 San Antonio Brewers of the Texas League.

Walton was added to the staff as first base coach and third base coach of Milwaukee manager Del Crandall for the 1973 season, and served for three full campaigns. Walton also served as a coach to the American League Team for the 1975 All-Star Game. After Crandall and his staff were fired at the close of 1975, Walton became an area scout with the Major League Baseball Scouting Bureau. He is based in his hometown of Shattuck.

In addition to continuing scouting for the Major League Scouting Bureau, Walton was appointed as the Advance Scout for Team USA's baseball team and was a part of the team for their Olympic Gold Medal win in the Olympic Games in Sydney, Australia in 2000. Walton continues to work tirelessly with prospective baseball players from all ages. Having assisted in building an indoor practice facility in his hometown of Shattuck, Oklahoma, players, both professional and those wishing to play professional baseball come from all over the country to work out with Walton and obtain his extended knowledge of the mechanics of playing baseball and to improve their skills. At the 2009 Winter Meetings in Nashville, Tennessee Walton was awarded with the Scout of the Year award.

Walton married Nancy E. Foster in December 1961, and they had one son, Paul (born 1963). Walton and his wife remained in Shattuck, where he continued to base his Major League scouting work year-round. He died there on May 14, 2023, at the age of 87.
