= Ellie Rodríguez =

Puerto Rican baseball player & manager (1946–2026)

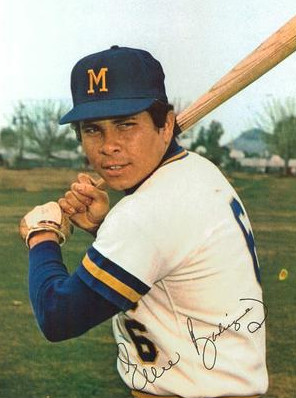
- Catcher
- Born: May 24, 1946; Fajardo, Puerto Rico
- Died: April 23, 2026 (aged 79); San Juan, Puerto Rico
- Batted: Right Threw: Right

MLB debut
- May 26, 1968, for the New York Yankees

Last MLB appearance
- October 3, 1976, for the Los Angeles Dodgers

MLB statistics
- Batting average: .245
- Home runs: 16
- Runs batted in: 203
- Stats at Baseball Reference

Teams
- New York Yankees (1968); Kansas City Royals (1969–1970); Milwaukee Brewers (1971–1973); California Angels (1974–1975); Los Angeles Dodgers (1976)

Career highlights and awards
- 2× All-Star (1969, 1972)

Eliseo Rodríguez Delgado (May 24, 1946 – April 23, 2026) was a Puerto Rican professional baseball catcher. He played in Major League Baseball (MLB) from 1968 to 1976 for the New York Yankees, Kansas City Royals, Milwaukee Brewers, California Angels, and Los Angeles Dodgers.

== Early life ==
Rodriguez was born in Fajardo, Puerto Rico, on May 24, 1946. His family moved to New York City in 1953, growing up within walking distance of Yankee Stadium. His boyhood idol was Yankees catcher Yogi Berra. He was an amateur boxer as a teenager. Rodriguez attended James Monroe High School in the Bronx, New York, graduating in 1964.

== Baseball career ==
=== Minor league ===
His professional baseball career began in 1964 when he was signed by the Kansas City Athletics as an amateur free agent after graduating from James Monroe High School. He spent the 1964 season in the rookie and Single-A Minor league baseball teams of the Athletics, playing catcher. At the end of the season, on November 30, 1964, he was drafted by the New York Yankees from the Athletics in the 1964 first-year player draft. Rodríguez spent the next few years moving up the Yankees farm system, eventually making it to the Triple-A Syracuse Chiefs in 1967. In 1966, he was named to the Southern League All-Star Team with the Double-A Columbus (Georgia) Confederate Yankees. In 1968, Rodríguez made his major league debut for the Yankees.

=== Major league ===
Rodríguez debuted for the Yankees on May 26, 1968, against the Chicago White Sox, starting at catcher. He played nine games over the course of the season while also spending time in Syracuse as well, where he had a .291 batting average. On October 15, 1968, Rodríguez was drafted by the Kansas City Royals from the New York Yankees as the 13th pick in the 1968 MLB expansion draft. In his first season with the expansion Royals (1969), he was named to play in his first Major League Baseball All-Star Game, though he did not play in the game. He finished the season with a batting average of .236 in 95 games. The following season he split time at catcher with Ed Kirkpatrick.

On February 2, 1971, after the end of the 1970 Kansas City Royals season, the Royals traded Rodríguez to the Milwaukee Brewers for Carl Taylor. He regained his starting role as the 1971 Milwaukee Brewers season began. Rodríguez played 115 games in 1971, yet only had a batting average of .210. He played 116 games the following season en route to his second All-Star game, which he also did not play in. He finished the season with a career-high batting average of .285 and over 100 hits.

After splitting time at catcher with Darrell Porter the following season, Rodríguez was involved in a nine-player transaction when he was sent along with Ollie Brown, Joe Lahoud, Skip Lockwood and Gary Ryerson from the Brewers to the California Angels for Steve Barber, Clyde Wright, Ken Berry, Art Kusnyer and cash on October 23, 1973. Rodríguez ended up having a breakout year in 1974. He had a fielding percentage of .992 (second best in the AL), played a career-high 140 games, and hit a career-high seven home runs.

During the 1974 California Angels season, Rodríguez tied an American League record with 19 putouts in a nine-inning game and set another with 21 putouts in an extra-inning game, while catching in games pitched by Nolan Ryan. He also led the league in putouts by a catcher, throwing out attempted base stealers (with 10 more than the next closest catcher), and tied Thurman Munson for the league lead in assists by catchers. On May 27, 1974, he threw out four Milwaukee Brewers trying to steal second base, an Angels record. The following season (1975), he played 90 games as catcher, and caught Nolan Ryan's fourth no-hitter.

On March 31, 1976, he was traded by the California Angels to the Los Angeles Dodgers for Orlando Alvarez and cash, and spent one season with the Dodgers, starting only 21 games before being released on May 2, 1977. He started the 1977 season on the disabled list after breaking his collar bone during winter ball in Puerto Rico, and did not play major league baseball again.

=== Post major league ===
In 1977, the Pittsburgh Pirates signed Rodriguez to play Triple-A minor league baseball with their affiliate the Columbus Clippers, where he played 49 games. He played and/or managed in Mexican League baseball from 1978 to 1982. He managed the Triple-A Cafeteros de Córdoba team in 1985.

Rodríguez became a player development consultant for the Atlantic League of Professional Baseball and in charge of scouting Latin America for the league. He was later announced as manager for the 2018 Road Warriors, a traveling team that temporarily replaced the folded Bridgeport Bluefish in the Atlantic League. He was also a coach at the Roosevelt Baseball School in San Juan, teaching baseball fundamentals to children from ages 6 to 18.

Rodriguez died on April 23, 2026, at the age of 79.

== See also ==
- List of players from Puerto Rico in Major League Baseball
