= Ken Berry (baseball) =

American baseball player (born 1941)

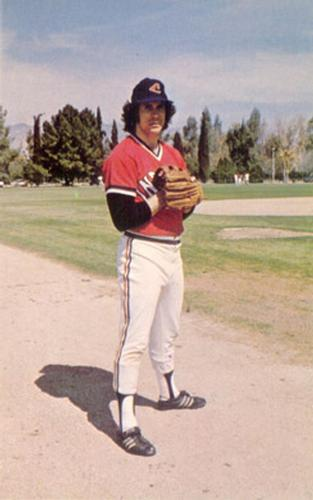
- Center fielder
- Born: May 10, 1941 (age 84); Kansas City, Missouri, U.S.
- Batted: Right Threw: Right

MLB debut
- September 9, 1962, for the Chicago White Sox

Last MLB appearance
- May 31, 1975, for the Cleveland Indians

MLB statistics
- Batting average: .255
- Home runs: 58
- Runs batted in: 343
- Stats at Baseball Reference

Teams
- Chicago White Sox (1962–1970); California Angels (1971–1973); Milwaukee Brewers (1974); Cleveland Indians (1975)

Career highlights and awards
- All-Star (1967); 2× Gold Glove Award (1970, 1972)

Allen Kent Berry (born May 10, 1941) is an American former professional baseball player. He played in Major League Baseball as a center fielder from 1962 through 1975, most notably as a member of the Chicago White Sox. The two-time Gold Glove winner was an American League All-Star player in 1967. He also played for the California Angels, Milwaukee Brewers and the Cleveland Indians. In 2015, Berry was inducted into the Kansas Sports Hall of Fame.

== Career ==
Berry was born in Kansas City, Missouri, and attended Washburn Rural High School in Topeka, Kansas, where he starred in football, basketball and track and field. After graduating from High School in 1959, he continued to play football and basketball as a freshman while attending Wichita State University. Berry also played one year in a work/play program for the McPherson (Kansas) BJs in the Ban Johnson League. That year McPherson went to the National Ban Johnson League tournament finals played in Wichita.

Berry was signed by the Chicago White Sox as an amateur free agent before the 1961 season. He made his major league debut with the White Sox at the age of 21 on September 9, 1962. He was named to the American League All-Star team in 1967, when his White Sox battled the Boston Red Sox, Detroit Tigers, and Minnesota Twins for the pennant all the way down to the last few days of the season.

He led league outfielders in putouts once (1965) and in fielding percentage three times (1970, 1972, and 1973). He tied for the league lead once each in assists and double plays, both in 1972. After a campaign in which he batted .276 with 50 runs batted in (RBI) and 7 home runs, Berry was traded along with Syd O'Brien and Billy Wynne from the White Sox to the Angels for Jay Johnstone, Tom Egan and Tom Bradley on November 30, 1970. He was involved in a nine-player transaction three years later when he was sent along with Steve Barber, Clyde Wright, Art Kusnyer and cash from the Angels to the Brewers for Ellie Rodríguez, Ollie Brown, Joe Lahoud, Skip Lockwood and Gary Ryerson on October 23, 1973. He played in his final major league game at the age of 34 with the Indians on May 31, 1975.

During the 1967 baseball season when the White Sox were battling the Red Sox for the pennant, Berry made the final out in a 4-3 loss when he was tagged out at home plate by Elston Howard after he tried to score on a line drive to right field that was caught by Jose Tartabull. Not known for having a strong arm, Tartabull’s throw sailed high and was caught by a leaping Howard who blocked the plate with his left foot as he came down, and swipe tagged Berry ending the game. For Red Sox fans, the play was considered a key event during their ”Impossible Dream” season.

== Career statistics ==
In a fourteen-year major league career, Berry played in 1,384 games, accumulating 1,053 hits in 4,136 at bats for a .255 career batting average along with 58 home runs, 343 runs batted in and a .308 on-base percentage. He ended his career with a .989 fielding percentage. A good defensive player, he led American League outfielders three times in fielding percentage.

Career highlights include:

- 20 consecutive-game hitting streak (May 28, 1967 – June 15, 1967)
- Eight four-hit games – The most significant being three singles and a home run against the New York Yankees (June 7, 1970)
- 39 three-hit games
- One five-RBI game, including a grand slam against the Detroit Tigers right-hander Joe Sparma (June 15, 1968)
- Three four-RBI games, including a pair of two-run homers vs. the Kansas City Royals (May 15, 1970)

== Personal life ==
In 1988, he played the heckler in the film Eight Men Out.

In 2012, Berry---now a grandfather---published two children's books, Artie the Awesome Apple and Clyde the Clumsy Camel. He told the Topeka Capital-Journal he began writing the books in December 2011 and kept on after his wife told him they were "not bad." The newspaper said Berry often entertained his children on long drives to spring training by making up stories about three friendly ghosts.

Berry was inducted into the Kansas Sports Hall of Fame in 2015.
