= Clyde Wright =

American baseball player (born 1941)

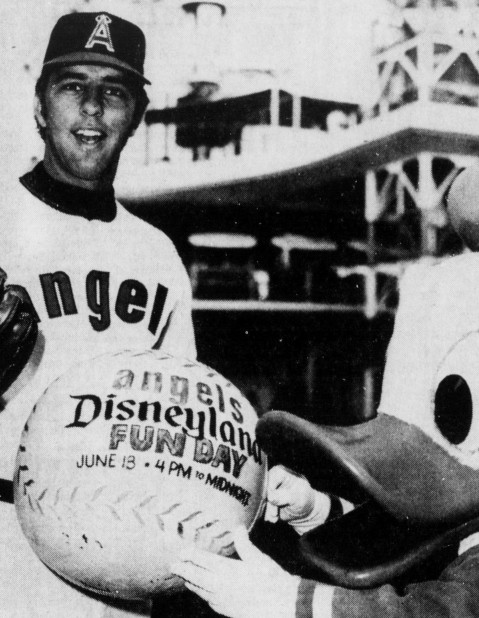
- Wright in a 1972 Disneyland promotion
- Pitcher
- Born: February 20, 1941 (age 84); Jefferson City, Tennessee, U.S.
- Batted: Right Threw: Left

Professional debut
- MLB: June 15, 1966, for the California Angels
- NPB: May 29, 1976, for the Yomiuri Giants

Last appearance
- MLB: September 26, 1975, for the Texas Rangers
- NPB: July 10, 1978, for the Yomiuri Giants

MLB statistics
- Win–loss record: 100–111
- Earned run average: 3.50
- Strikeouts: 667

NPB statistics
- Win–loss record: 22–18
- Earned run average: 3.97
- Strikeouts: 142
- Stats at Baseball Reference

Teams
- California Angels (1966–1973); Milwaukee Brewers (1974); Texas Rangers (1975); Yomiuri Giants (1976–1978)

Career highlights and awards
- All-Star (1970); Pitched no-hitter on July 3, 1970

Clyde Wright (born February 20, 1941), nicknamed "Skeeter", is an American former professional baseball player. A left-handed pitcher, he played all or part of ten seasons in Major League Baseball for the California Angels (1966–73), Milwaukee Brewers (1974) and Texas Rangers (1975). He also pitched three seasons in Japan for the Yomiuri Giants (1976–78). He is the father of Jaret Wright. He is a member of the National Association of Intercollegiate Athletics (NAIA) Hall of Fame.

== Early life ==
Wright was born on February 20, 1941, in Jefferson City, Tennessee, where he was raised on a tobacco farm. Wright attended Jefferson High School, where he had above a B-average as a student and was a pitching star on the school's baseball team. He also played for a team in the local Connie Mack League. He also played on the school basketball team.

After graduating high school, Wright wanted to obtain a college degree before becoming a professional baseball player, and attended Carson-Newman College, receiving his Bachelor of Science degree in physical education in 1965. In September 1965, he was honored by the local Chamber of commerce with a Clyde Wright Night in Jefferson City.

== College career ==
Wright was a star pitcher at Carson-Newman, whom he helped pitch to the 1965 NAIA Baseball World Series title. Wright was the Most Valuable Player in that tournament, which the Eagles won in a best of five-game series, 3–2, over Nebraska-Omaha. During that World Series, Wright struck out 22 batters in one game—to date an NAIA World Series record. He also holds the records for strikeouts in the NAIA championship tournament (37, tied with Ray Washburn) and innings pitched in a single tournament game (13).

As a freshman, he had an 8–2 won–loss record, with a 0.805 earned run average (ERA). By his sophomore year, he was heavily scouted by major league baseball teams.

Wright was inducted into the NAIA Hall of Fame on July 3, 1970.

== Minor leagues ==
The California Angels selected Wright in the 6th round of the June 1965 free agent draft. In 1965, he was assigned to the Single-A Quad Cities Angels. He had a 7–2 won–loss record and 1.99 earned run average (ERA), with 88 strikeouts in 77 innings pitched and only 20 bases on balls. In 1966, he was promoted to the Double-A El Paso Sun Kings of the Texas League. He played in 17 games, starting eight, and had a 9–0 record, with a 3.41 ERA and 77 strikeouts in 87 innings.

After being promoted to the Angels in 1966, he split time between the Angels and Triple-A Seattle Angels of the Pacific Coast League in 1967. At Seattle, he was 8–4 with a 3.07 ERA, in 13 starts. This would be his last year in the minor leagues.

== Major leagues ==
=== Angels ===
Wright was called up to the Angels in June 1965, and defeated the Minnesota Twins on a four-hitter in his Major League debut on June 15, 1966. He was a spot starter for the Angels in his first two seasons, going 5–5 in 1967, with a 3.26 ERA. In 1968, Wright won 10 games while losing six, with three saves, pitching mostly in relief.

In 1969, Wright won only one game with eight losses and a 4.10 earned run average; after the season, the Angels waived him. No other team wanted him, and his career seemed to be over. Teammate Jim Fregosi convinced Wright to accompany him to winter ball in Puerto Rico, where Fregosi managed the Ponce team. Fregosi recommended Wright experiment with a screwball (because Wright needed another pitch). Wright also experimented with a changeup. He learned how to throw the screwball, and revived his career.

Wright returned to the Angels in 1970 and had the best season of his career. He won 22 games, losing only 12, with career bests in wins and winning percentage. Wright became only the second 20-game winner in franchise history (Dean Chance had won 20 games in 1964) and established a career-low 2.83 ERA, which earned him the American League Comeback Player of the Year Award. Wright also no-hit the Oakland Athletics 4-0 at Anaheim Stadium on July 3 of that year, the first no-hitter pitched in that stadium. He threw only 98 pitches in a game that took less than two hours to complete. The day was doubly memorable for Wright: in a pre-game ceremony, he had been inducted into the NAIA Hall of Fame.

Wright's no-hitter finished with Sandy Alomar Sr. converting Felipe Alou's ground ball into a double play. Like Wright, Alomar and Alou had sons who would play Major League Baseball (MLB): Alomar is the father of Sandy Jr. and Roberto, and Alou is the father of Moises. Wright's son Jaret Wright had an 11-year MLB pitching career. Jaret Wright, Sandy Alomar Jr. and Moisés Alou all participated in the 1997 World Series: Alomar Jr. was Jaret Wright's catcher with the Cleveland Indians (the winning battery in Game 4), and Moises Alou was a starting outfielder for the victorious Florida Marlins.

The 22-win season made Clyde Wright, to date, the only Angel left-hander to win 20 games in a season. 22 wins also remains tied as a franchise record, Nolan Ryan having equaled it in 1974.

Wright was selected to the All-Star team in 1970, the only All-Star selection of his career. He was the losing pitcher of the game (which was played at the newly opened Riverfront Stadium eleven days after his no-hitter), giving up the game-winning single to fellow Tennessee native Jim Hickman (his eventual 1970 National League Comeback Player of the Year counterpart) in the 12th inning. Hickman drove in Pete Rose for the winning run, Rose barreling over Cleveland Indian catcher Ray Fosse to score the run in one of the most iconic, or notorious, moments in All-Star game history. The game's winning pitcher was also a native Tennessean – Claude Osteen.

Wright went 16-17 in 1971 with a 2.99 ERA and a career-high 135 strikeouts, and 18-11 in 1972 with a 2.98 ERA, before falling to 11-19 with a 3.68 ERA in 1973. Injuries were a cause for the struggles; Wright had so much back pain in 1973 that he could not even bend over. He was involved in a nine-player transaction when he was sent along with Steve Barber, Ken Berry, Art Kusnyer and cash from the Angels to the Milwaukee Brewers for Ellie Rodríguez, Ollie Brown, Joe Lahoud, Skip Lockwood and Gary Ryerson on October 23, 1973.

=== Final years ===
In 1974, he became the first 20-game loser in the Milwaukee franchise's history (9–20), and remains its only 20-game loser (through 2024). He was traded from the Brewers to the Texas Rangers for Pete Broberg at the Winter Meetings on December 5, 1974. He pitched one season in Texas, and was then released just prior to the start of the 1976 season.

== Nippon Professional Baseball ==
Not long after his release from the Rangers, Wright went to Japan, and signed with the Yomiuri Giants. He pitched for them for three seasons, but his stay in Japan almost ended before the first season was over. Early in that first season, manager Shigeo Nagashima pulled Wright from a game tied at 1-1 in the sixth inning, after Wright allowed the first two batters to reach base. Wright refused to hand over the ball, then charged off the mound and fired the ball into the dugout. He then went into the clubhouse, where he tore off his uniform and threw it into a bathtub, which gave rise to another nickname, "Crazy Wright". This nickname stuck with him throughout his stay in Japan. Fans and sportswriters called for Wright's release, but Nagashima defended his pitcher. In three years for the Giants, he was 22–18 with a 3.97 ERA. One of his teammates was the legendary Sadaharu Oh.

Wright eventually became popular by throwing baseballs into the stands for young fans. He went 8-7 in that first season with the Giants and won Game 5 of the Japan Series, hitting a home run in that game. However, he lost Game 7 on two late-inning home runs; he had told an interpreter to ask the team to remove him due to fatigue.

== Personal life ==
Wright did not have an alcoholic drink (½ of a beer) until his first year in professional baseball, at age 23, which escalated to Canadian whiskey over time, and he eventually became an alcoholic. It ultimately undermined his professional career. He once pitched a game against the Minnesota Twins while still drunk. With professional help, he stopped drinking in 1979. In light of the opportunities for drinking, he thought it likely that any major league baseball team had at least one alcoholic on the roster. He made a television commercial about his alcoholism to discourage others, and became a public speaker on the subject. He also counseled other professional players, and boys at his baseball youth camp if they were found drinking.

Wright feared he was an alcoholic after his Major League Baseball days. He began drinking heavily while in Japan, and over the next few years the problem worsened as he reached the depths of his drinking. In 1996 he told the Los Angeles Times that in 1979, his wife Vicki gave him an ultimatum: stop drinking or she would divorce him. "I went golfing one day and then drinking and when I came home, she was gone. When she came back, Jaret was in the van. I went to open the door and he pushed the lock down. He was 3 years old." That was the day he first sought help. Clyde Wright has not had a drink since.

After retiring as a pitcher, Wright opened the Clyde Wright Pitching School at Home Run Park batting cages in Anaheim, California, where he gave pitching lessons for four decades before retiring. Wright also went on to do public relations for the Angels.

He opened Clyde Wright's Tennessee Bar-B-Que at Angel Stadium, where he supervises the cooking and signs autographs.

Preceded by Dock Ellis	No-hitter pitcher July 3, 1970	Succeeded by Bill Singer
