= Gary Ryerson =

American baseball player (born 1948)

- Pitcher
- Born: June 17, 1948 (age 76); Los Angeles, California, U.S.
- Batted: Right Threw: Left

MLB debut
- June 28, 1972, for the Milwaukee Brewers

Last MLB appearance
- September 3, 1973, for the Milwaukee Brewers

MLB statistics
- Win–loss record: 3–9
- Earned run average: 4.39
- Strikeouts: 55

Teams
- Milwaukee Brewers (1972–1973)

Gary Lawrence Ryerson (born June 17, 1948) is an American former Major League Baseball pitcher. Ryerson was drafted in the thirteenth round of the 1966 Major League Baseball draft by the San Francisco Giants. In 1971, Ryerson was traded along with minor league player Wes Scott to the Milwaukee Brewers for John Morris. During his time with the Brewers, Ryerson played parts of two seasons at the Major League level. He was involved in a nine-player transaction when he was sent along with Ellie Rodríguez, Ollie Brown, Joe Lahoud and Skip Lockwood from the Brewers to the California Angels for Steve Barber, Clyde Wright, Ken Berry, Art Kusnyer and cash on October 23, 1973. He was selected by the Giants from the Salt Lake City Angels in the Rule 5 draft six weeks later on December 3, 1973. He never played at the Major League level with the Giants.
