= Steve Barber =

American baseball player (1938–2007)

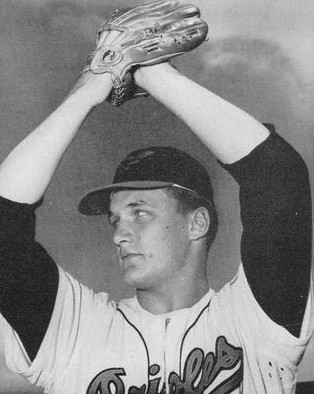
- Pitcher
- Born: February 22, 1938; Takoma Park, Maryland, U.S.
- Died: February 4, 2007 (aged 68); Henderson, Nevada, U.S.
- Batted: Left Threw: Left

MLB debut
- April 21, 1960, for the Baltimore Orioles

Last MLB appearance
- July 31, 1974, for the San Francisco Giants

MLB statistics
- Win–loss record: 121–106
- Earned run average: 3.36
- Strikeouts: 1,309
- Stats at Baseball Reference

Teams
- Baltimore Orioles (1960–1967); New York Yankees (1967–1968); Seattle Pilots (1969); Chicago Cubs (1970); Atlanta Braves (1970–1972); California Angels (1972–1973); San Francisco Giants (1974)

Career highlights and awards
- 2× All-Star (1963, 1966); Pitched combined no-hitter on April 30, 1967; Baltimore Orioles Hall of Fame

Stephen David Barber (February 22, 1938 – February 4, 2007) was an American Major League Baseball (MLB) left-handed pitcher. He pitched for the Baltimore Orioles and six other teams from 1960 to 1974. Barber spent his first eight years with the Orioles, where he compiled an outstanding 95–75 record as a member of the 1960's Baltimore Orioles Kiddie Korps of pitchers, all 22 years old or younger (Barber, Milt Pappas, Chuck Estrada, Jack Fisher, and Jerry Walker). He was the modern Orioles first 20 game winner.

Arm injuries hampered the rest of his career which saw him win only 26 and lose 31 for the rest of his 15-year career. While with the Orioles, Barber was an All-Star for two seasons. From 1961 to 1967, Barber bucked baseball superstition by wearing number 13. He also wore this number with the Seattle Pilots. Barber was inducted into the Orioles Hall of Fame in 1988.

== Early life ==
Barber was born on February 22, 1938 in Takoma Park, Maryland, and was raised in Silver Spring. He graduated in 1956 from Montgomery Blair High School located in Silver Spring in Montgomery County, Maryland. He shortly attended the University of Maryland, but left the school. Barber signed with the Orioles in 1957, joining the Orioles minor league system where he played for three years. He received little instruction, until demanding it of the Orioles general manager Lee McPhail. In response, the Orioles finally sent him to the Florida Instructional League in 1959, where he came under the tutelage of Luman Harris and Harry Brecheen.

== Major League career ==
As a rookie in 1960, he had a record of 10–7 and an earned run average of 3.22 (sixth-best in the American League) in 36 games (27 starts), but also led the American League (AL) in both walks (113) and wild pitches (ten). In 1961, he tied for the AL lead in shutouts with eight, and had a record of 18–12 with a 3.33 ERA in 37 games (34 starts).

In 1963, he became the first modern Orioles' pitcher to win 20 games in a season when he compiled a 20–13 record, 180 strikeouts, and a 2.75 ERA in 39 games (36 starts), which led to him being selected as an American League All-Star for the first time in his career. He was also named an AL All-Star one last time in 1966. However, tendinitis in his elbow prevented him from appearing in the game, and also kept him out of the 1966 World Series as the Orioles swept the defending champion Los Angeles Dodgers in four games for the first title in franchise history.

On April 30, 1967, Barber was removed from a game against the Detroit Tigers with two outs in the ninth inning despite having not surrendered a hit. He had walked two men to start the inning, and then had two outs with runners at second and third when he threw a wild pitch, allowing the tying run to score. He then walked another batter, his tenth of the day (to go along with two hit batsmen and two wild pitches), and manager Hank Bauer took him out of the game, even though he still had the opportunity for a no hitter. Stu Miller came in to relieve Barber. The next batter hit a ground ball to hall of fame shortstop Luis Aparicio, who flipped it to Mark Belanger (playing second base) for a force out, but Belanger dropped the ball and the second run scored, giving the Tigers a 2-1 lead. Miller got the final out to complete the no-hitter, but the Orioles lost 2–1.

Ironically, Belanger would go on to replace Aparicio at shortstop for the Orioles, and become one of the top fielders in baseball history. When asked if he felt bad about the result, Barber said, "'no, I should have got beat 10–1. ... There's no problem pitching a no-hitter ... if you walk everyone who can hit you.'"

Barber spent the rest of his career plagued by elbow troubles. The Orioles traded him to the New York Yankees on July 4, 1967, for players to be named later, Ray Barker and cash. Later that year, on December 15, the Yankees sent minor-leaguers Chet Trail and Daniel Brady to the Orioles to complete the trade.

Barber was selected by the Seattle Pilots in the 1968 Major League Baseball expansion draft when the Yankees left him unprotected. Plagued by a sore arm, he worked in 25 games (16 starts) for the 1969 Pilots, going 4–7 with a 4.80 ERA. He was released just before the 1970 season, but played that year for the Chicago Cubs, and then for the Atlanta Braves, pitching almost exclusively in relief.

He remained with the Braves until they released him in May 1972, then joined the California Angels, where he remained until the end of the 1973 season. Barber was involved in a nine-player transaction when he was sent along with Clyde Wright, Ken Berry, Art Kusnyer and cash from the Angels to the Milwaukee Brewers for Ellie Rodríguez, Ollie Brown, Joe Lahoud, Skip Lockwood and Gary Ryerson on October 23, 1973. After being released by the Brewers during spring training, he later appeared in 13 games for the San Francisco Giants in the middle of the 1974 season. In August, he signed with the St. Louis Cardinals, but never pitched for the team.

In 466 MLB games pitched, including 272 as a starter, Barber posted a 121–106 won–lost mark and a 3.36 earned run average. He registered 59 complete games and 21 shutouts. He also had 14 saves as a relief pitcher. He allowed 1,818 hits and 950 bases on balls in 1,999 innings pitched, with 1,309 strikeouts.

== Later years and death ==
Barber and his wife moved to the Las Vegas area in 1978. He was employed as a driver for the Clark County School District, providing transportation for children with disabilities from 1992 to 2006. Barber died of pneumonia in Henderson, Nevada, on February 4, 2007.

Preceded by Sonny Siebert	No-hitter; April 30, 1967 w/Stu Miller	Succeeded by Don Wilson
