= Art Kusnyer =

American baseball player and coach (born 1945)

- Catcher
- Born: December 19, 1945 (age 80); Akron, Ohio, U.S.
- Batted: Right Threw: Right

MLB debut
- September 21, 1970, for the Chicago White Sox

Last MLB appearance
- October 1, 1978, for the Kansas City Royals

MLB statistics
- Batting average: .176
- Home runs: 3
- Runs batted in: 21
- Stats at Baseball Reference

Teams
- Chicago White Sox (1970); California Angels (1971–1973); Milwaukee Brewers (1976); Kansas City Royals (1978)

Career highlights and awards
- 2× World Series champion (1989, 2005)

Arthur William Kusnyer (/ˈkʊʃnər/ KUUSH-nər; born December 19, 1945) is an American former catcher in Major League Baseball who was drafted by the Chicago White Sox in the 37th round of the 1966 amateur draft. He played for the White Sox (1970), California Angels (1971–1973), Milwaukee Brewers (1976), and Kansas City Royals (1978).

He was somewhat error-prone behind the plate during sporadic playing time at the major league level, committing 20 errors in just 136 games for a .970 fielding percentage. He also had trouble at the plate, with a lifetime batting average of just .176 with 3 home runs and 21 RBIs in 313 career at bats.

Kusnyer was involved in a nine-player transaction when he was sent along with Steve Barber, Clyde Wright, Ken Berry and cash from the Angels to the Brewers for Ellie Rodríguez, Ollie Brown, Joe Lahoud, Skip Lockwood and Gary Ryerson on October 23, 1973.

After his playing career, he eventually found his way back to the White Sox as the bullpen coach, where he served for 19 years (1980–87, 1997–2007). In between, from 1988 to 1995, he held the same position with the Oakland Athletics. He was a longtime member of Tony La Russa's coaching staffs in both cities. Kusnyer stepped away from coaching full time in 2007 when his failing eyesight became too much of an obstacle. Between August 2007 and April 2008, he underwent eight surgeries to attempt to restore his vision. In 2008-2009, he was listed as a roving minor league instructor by the White Sox.

On September 11, 2001, the Chicago White Sox were in New York City for their series with the New York Yankees and Kusnyer, Chicago’s bullpen coach, witnessed the collapse of one of the World Trade Center towers.
