= Joe Lahoud =

American baseball player (born 1947)

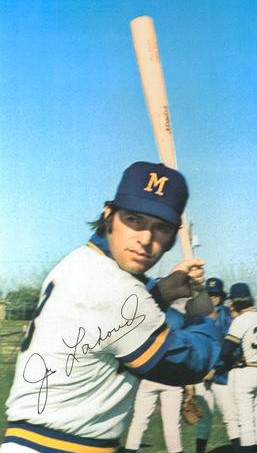
- Lahoud in 1973
- Outfielder
- Born: April 14, 1947 (age 77); Danbury, Connecticut, U.S.
- Batted: Left Threw: Left

MLB debut
- April 10, 1968, for the Boston Red Sox

Last MLB appearance
- May 24, 1978, for the Kansas City Royals

MLB statistics
- Batting average: .223
- Home runs: 65
- Runs batted in: 218
- Stats at Baseball Reference

Teams
- Boston Red Sox (1968–1971); Milwaukee Brewers (1972–1973); California Angels (1974–1976); Texas Rangers (1976); Kansas City Royals (1977–1978)

Joseph Michael Lahoud (born April 14, 1947) is an American former professional baseball player. He played all or part of eleven seasons in Major League Baseball, primarily as an outfielder and designated hitter, for the Boston Red Sox (1968–71), Milwaukee Brewers (1972–73), California Angels (1974–76), Texas Rangers (1976) and Kansas City Royals (1977–78).

== Early life ==
Lahoud is from Danbury, Connecticut. His parents emigrated to the United States from Lebanon before he was born.

== Career ==
Lahoud attended Henry Abbott Technical High School, then the University of New Haven, where he played college baseball for the New Haven Chargers.

Lahoud played for the Winston-Salem Red Sox of the Class A Carolina League in 1966 and 1967. Though optioned to the minor leagues during spring training in 1968, the Red Sox recalled Lahoud from the Louisville Colonels of the Class AAA International League at the start of the 1968 season as Tony Conigliaro struggled with his recovery from an eye injury. He was soon sent to Louisville to continue his development. The Red Sox optioned Lahoud to Louisville at the end of spring training in 1970.

Lahoud was part of a ten-player blockbuster that sent him, George Scott, Jim Lonborg, Ken Brett, Billy Conigliaro and Don Pavletich from the Red Sox to the Brewers for Tommy Harper, Marty Pattin, Lew Krausse Jr. and minor-league outfielder Pat Skrable on October 10, 1971. He was involved in a nine-player transaction two years later when he was sent along with Ellie Rodríguez, Ollie Brown, Skip Lockwood and Gary Ryerson from the Brewers to the Angels for Steve Barber, Clyde Wright, Ken Berry, Art Kusnyer and cash on October 23, 1973. On June 14, 1976, the Texas Rangers acquired Lahoud from the Angels for "slightly more than the waiver price".

In his career, Lahoud played in 791 games and had a .223 batting average with 65 home runs, 218 runs batted in, 429 hits, 239 runs scored, and a .372 slugging percentage. On June 11, 1969, he hit three home runs in one game for the Red Sox.
