= 1971 Milwaukee Brewers season =

1971 Milwaukee Brewers
- League: American League
- Division: West
- Ballpark: Milwaukee County Stadium
- City: Milwaukee, Wisconsin
- Record: 69–92 (.429)
- Divisional place: 6th
- Owners: Bud Selig
- General managers: Frank Lane
- Managers: Dave Bristol
- Television: WTMJ-TV
- Radio: WTMJ (AM) (Merle Harmon, Tom Collins, Bob Uecker)
- Stats: ESPN.com; Baseball Reference

The 1971 Milwaukee Brewers season was the 2nd season for the Brewers in Milwaukee, and their 3rd overall. The Brewers' finished sixth in the American League West with a record of 69 wins and 92 losses.

== Offseason ==
- October 1, 1970: Sixto Lezcano was signed by the Milwaukee Brewers as an amateur free agent.
- October 20, 1970: Jerry McNertney, George Lauzerique, and Jesse Huggins (minors) were traded by the Brewers to the St. Louis Cardinals for Carl Taylor and Jim Ellis.
- October 20, 1970: Larry Bearnarth was purchased by the Brewers from the New York Mets.
- December 2, 1970: Hank Allen, John Ryan (minors) and Paul Click (minors) were traded by the Brewers to the Atlanta Braves for Bob Tillman.
- February 2, 1971: Carl Taylor was traded by the Brewers to the Kansas City Royals for Ellie Rodríguez.
- February 10, 1971: Al Downing was traded by the Brewers to the Los Angeles Dodgers for Andy Kosco.
- March 6, 1971: Oakland Athletics owner Charlie Finley persuaded American League president Joe Cronin to have a preseason game in which a walk was allowed on three pitches rather than four. The Athletics bested the Milwaukee Brewers by a 13–9 tally. Nineteen total walks were issued in the game, and a collective six home runs were hit.

== Regular season ==
=== Season standings ===
AL West
Team	W	L	Pct.	GB	Home	Road
Oakland Athletics	101	60	.627	—	46‍–‍35	55‍–‍25
Kansas City Royals	85	76	.528	16	44‍–‍37	41‍–‍39
Chicago White Sox	79	83	.488	22½	39‍–‍42	40‍–‍41
California Angels	76	86	.469	25½	35‍–‍46	41‍–‍40
Minnesota Twins	74	86	.463	26½	37‍–‍42	37‍–‍44
Milwaukee Brewers	69	92	.429	32	34‍–‍48	35‍–‍44

=== Record vs. opponents ===
1971 American League record Sources:
Team	BAL	BOS	CAL	CWS	CLE	DET	KC	MIL	MIN	NYY	OAK	WAS
Baltimore	—	9–9	7–5	8–4	13–5	8–10	6–5	9–3	10–2	11–7	7–4	13–3
Boston	9–9	—	6–6	10–2	11–7	12–6	1–11	6–6	8–4	7–11	3–9	12–6
California	5–7	6–6	—	8–10	8–4	6–6	8–10	6–12	12–6	6–6	7–11	4–8
Chicago	4–8	2–10	10–8	—	3–9	7–5	9–9	11–7	7–11	5–7	11–7	10–2
Cleveland	5–13	7–11	4–8	9–3	—	6–12	2–10	4–8	4–8	8–10	4–8	7–11
Detroit	10–8	6–12	6–6	5–7	12–6	—	8–4	10–2	6–6	10–8	4–8	14–4
Kansas City	5–6	11–1	10–8	9–9	10–2	4–8	—	8–10	9–9	5–7	5–13	9–3
Milwaukee	3–9	6–6	12–6	7–11	8–4	2–10	10–8	—	10–7	2–10	3–15	6–6
Minnesota	2–10	4–8	6–12	11–7	8–4	6–6	9–9	7–10	—	8–4	8–10	5–6
New York	7–11	11–7	6–6	7–5	10–8	8–10	7–5	10–2	4–8	—	5–7	7–11
Oakland	4–7	9–3	11–7	7–11	8–4	8–4	13–5	15–3	10–8	7–5	—	9–3
Washington	3–13	6–12	8–4	2–10	11–7	4–14	3–9	6–6	6–5	11–7	3–9	—

=== Notable transactions ===
- April 22, 1971: Ray Peters and Pete Koegel were traded by the Brewers to the Philadelphia Phillies for Johnny Briggs.
- May 11, 1971: Ted Savage was traded by the Brewers to the Kansas City Royals for Tom Matchick.
- June 1, 1971: Floyd Wicker was traded by the Brewers to the San Francisco Giants for Bob Heise.
- June 7, 1971: Danny Walton was traded by the Brewers to the New York Yankees for Frank Tepedino and Bobby Mitchell.
- June 8, 1971: 1971 Major League Baseball draft
  - Rob Ellis was drafted by the Brewers in the 1st round.
  - Kevin Kobel was drafted by the Brewers in the 10th round.
- July 8, 1971: Phil Roof was traded by the Brewers to the Minnesota Twins for Paul Ratliff.

=== Roster ===
1971 Milwaukee Brewers
Roster
Pitchers: 29 Larry Bearnarth; 40 Jerry Bell; 49 Dick Ellsworth; 25 John Gelnar; 34 Jim Hannan; 24 Lew Krausse Jr.; 42 Skip Lockwood; 38 Marcelino López; 35 John Morris; 52 Bill Parsons; 33 Marty Pattin; 25 Bob Reynolds; 20 Ken Sanders; 41 Jim Slaton; 49 Floyd Weaver	Catchers: 15 Darrell Porter; 5 Paul Ratliff; 6 Ellie Rodríguez; 5 Phil Roof; Infielders: 19 Rick Auerbach; 8 Rob Ellis; 22 Gus Gil; 8 Mike Hegan; 2 Bob Heise; 17 Pete Koegel; 1 Ted Kubiak; 22 Tom Matchick; 28 Roberto Peña; 9 Ducky Schofield; 7 Frank Tepedino; 16 Ron Theobald	Outfielders: 12 Johnny Briggs; 1 José Cardenal; 21 Tommy Harper; 10 Andy Kosco; 11 Dave May; 23 Bobby Mitchell; 2 Ted Savage; 22 Bernie Smith; 32 Bill Voss; 12 Danny Walton; 9 Al Yates; Other batters: 40 Floyd Wicker	Manager: 4 Dave Bristol; Coaches: 27 Cal Ermer (Third base); 31 Harvey Kuenn (Hitting); 26 Roy McMillan (First base); 30 Jackie Moore (Bullpen); 18 Wes Stock (Pitching)

== Player stats ==
=== Batting ===
==== Starters by position ====
Note: Pos = Position; G = Games played; AB = At bats; H = Hits; Avg. = Batting average; HR = Home runs; RBI = Runs batted in

Pos	Player	G	AB	H	Avg.	HR	RBI
C	Ellie Rodríguez	115	319	67	.210	1	30
1B	Johnny Briggs	125	375	99	.264	21	59
2B	Ron Theobald	126	388	107	.276	1	23
SS	Rick Auerbach	79	236	48	.203	1	9
3B	Tommy Matchick	42	114	25	.219	1	7
LF	Andy Kosco	98	264	60	.227	10	39
CF	Dave May	144	501	139	.277	16	65
RF	Bill Voss	97	275	69	.251	10	30

==== Other batters ====
Note: G = Games played; AB = At bats; H = Hits; Avg. = Batting average; HR = Home runs; RBI = Runs batted in

Player	G	AB	H	Avg.	HR	RBI
Roberto Peña	113	274	65	.237	3	28
Andy Kosco	98	264	60	.227	10	39
Ted Kubiak	89	260	59	.227	3	17
José Cardenal	53	198	91	.258	3	32
Bob Heise	68	189	48	.254	0	7
Mike Hegan	46	122	27	.221	4	11
Phil Roof	41	114	22	.193	1	10
Rob Ellis	36	111	22	.198	0	6
Frank Tepedino	53	106	21	.198	2	7
Darrell Porter	22	70	15	.214	2	9
Danny Walton	30	69	14	.203	2	9
Bobby Mitchell	35	55	10	.182	2	6
Al Yates	24	47	13	.277	1	4
Paul Ratliff	23	41	7	.171	3	7
Bernie Smith	15	36	5	.139	1	3
Gus Gil	14	32	5	.156	0	3
Ducky Schofield	23	28	3	.107	0	1
Ted Savage	14	17	3	.176	0	1
Floyd Wicker	11	8	1	.125	0	0
Pete Koegel	2	3	0	.000	0	0

=== Pitching ===
==== Starting pitchers ====
Note: G = Games pitched; IP = Innings pitched; W = Wins; L = Losses; ERA = Earned run average; SO = Strikeouts

Player	G	IP	W	L	ERA	SO
Marty Pattin	36	264.2	14	14	3.13	169
Bill Parsons	36	244.2	13	17	3.20	139
Skip Lockwood	33	208.0	10	15	3.33	115
Jim Slaton	26	147.2	10	8	3.78	63

==== Other pitchers ====
Note: G = Games pitched; IP = Innings pitched; W = Wins; L = Losses; ERA = Earned run average; SO = Strikeouts

Player	G	IP	W	L	ERA	SO
Lew Krausse Jr.	43	180.1	8	12	2.94	92
Marcelino López	31	67.2	2	7	4.66	42

==== Relief pitchers ====
Note: G = Games pitched; W = Wins; L = Losses; SV = Saves; ERA = Earned run average; SO = Strikeouts

Player	G	W	L	SV	ERA	SO
Ken Sanders	83	7	12	31	1.91	80
John Morris	43	2	2	1	3.72	42
Jim Hannan	21	1	1	0	5.01	17
Floyd Weaver	21	0	1	0	7.24	12
Dick Ellsworth	11	0	1	0	4.91	10
Jerry Bell	8	2	1	0	3.07	8
Bob Reynolds	3	0	1	0	3.00	4
Larry Bearnarth	2	0	0	0	18.00	2
John Gelnar	2	0	0	0	13.50	0

== Farm system ==
The Brewers' farm system consisted of three minor league affiliates in 1971.

Level	Team	League	Manager
Triple-A	Evansville Triplets	American Association	Del Crandall
Class A	Danville Warriors	Midwest League	Sandy Johnson
Class A Short Season	Newark Co-Pilots	New York–Penn League	Al Widmar
