= 1971 Cleveland Indians season =

1971 Cleveland Indians
- League: American League
- Division: East
- Ballpark: Cleveland Municipal Stadium
- City: Cleveland, Ohio
- Owners: Vernon Stouffer
- General managers: Alvin Dark, Gabe Paul
- Managers: Alvin Dark, Johnny Lipon
- Television: WJW-TV
- Radio: WERE (1300)

The 1971 Cleveland Indians season was the 71st in franchise history. The team finished sixth in the American League East with a record of 60–102, 43 games behind the Baltimore Orioles.

== Regular season ==
In the summer of 1971, Indians owner Vernon Stouffer was entertaining overtures with regards to the Cleveland Indians playing 27 to 30 home dates a year in New Orleans.

=== Season standings ===
AL East
| Team | W | L | Pct. | GB | Home | Road |
|---|---|---|---|---|---|---|
| Baltimore Orioles | 101 | 57 | .639 | — | 53‍–‍24 | 48‍–‍33 |
| Detroit Tigers | 91 | 71 | .562 | 12 | 54‍–‍27 | 37‍–‍44 |
| Boston Red Sox | 85 | 77 | .525 | 18 | 47‍–‍33 | 38‍–‍44 |
| New York Yankees | 82 | 80 | .506 | 21 | 44‍–‍37 | 38‍–‍43 |
| Washington Senators | 63 | 96 | .396 | 38½ | 35‍–‍46 | 28‍–‍50 |
| Cleveland Indians | 60 | 102 | .370 | 43 | 29‍–‍52 | 31‍–‍50 |

=== Record vs. opponents ===
1971 American League record Sources:
| Team | BAL | BOS | CAL | CWS | CLE | DET | KC | MIL | MIN | NYY | OAK | WAS |
|---|---|---|---|---|---|---|---|---|---|---|---|---|
| Baltimore | — | 9–9 | 7–5 | 8–4 | 13–5 | 8–10 | 6–5 | 9–3 | 10–2 | 11–7 | 7–4 | 13–3 |
| Boston | 9–9 | — | 6–6 | 10–2 | 11–7 | 12–6 | 1–11 | 6–6 | 8–4 | 7–11 | 3–9 | 12–6 |
| California | 5–7 | 6–6 | — | 8–10 | 8–4 | 6–6 | 8–10 | 6–12 | 12–6 | 6–6 | 7–11 | 4–8 |
| Chicago | 4–8 | 2–10 | 10–8 | — | 3–9 | 7–5 | 9–9 | 11–7 | 7–11 | 5–7 | 11–7 | 10–2 |
| Cleveland | 5–13 | 7–11 | 4–8 | 9–3 | — | 6–12 | 2–10 | 4–8 | 4–8 | 8–10 | 4–8 | 7–11 |
| Detroit | 10–8 | 6–12 | 6–6 | 5–7 | 12–6 | — | 8–4 | 10–2 | 6–6 | 10–8 | 4–8 | 14–4 |
| Kansas City | 5–6 | 11–1 | 10–8 | 9–9 | 10–2 | 4–8 | — | 8–10 | 9–9 | 5–7 | 5–13 | 9–3 |
| Milwaukee | 3–9 | 6–6 | 12–6 | 7–11 | 8–4 | 2–10 | 10–8 | — | 10–7 | 2–10 | 3–15 | 6–6 |
| Minnesota | 2–10 | 4–8 | 6–12 | 11–7 | 8–4 | 6–6 | 9–9 | 7–10 | — | 8–4 | 8–10 | 5–6 |
| New York | 7–11 | 11–7 | 6–6 | 7–5 | 10–8 | 8–10 | 7–5 | 10–2 | 4–8 | — | 5–7 | 7–11 |
| Oakland | 4–7 | 9–3 | 11–7 | 7–11 | 8–4 | 8–4 | 13–5 | 15–3 | 10–8 | 7–5 | — | 9–3 |
| Washington | 3–13 | 6–12 | 8–4 | 2–10 | 11–7 | 4–14 | 3–9 | 6–6 | 6–5 | 11–7 | 3–9 | — |

=== Opening Day Lineup ===
Opening Day Starters
| # | Name | Position |
|---|---|---|
| 16 | Larry Brown | SS |
| 12 | Graig Nettles | 3B |
| 27 | Roy Foster | LF |
| 8 | Ray Fosse | C |
| 40 | Ken Harrelson | 1B |
| 24 | Eddie Leon | 2B |
| 22 | Ted Ford | RF |
| 25 | Buddy Bradford | CF |
| 34 | Steve Hargan | P |

=== Roster ===
1971 Cleveland Indians
Roster
| Pitchers: 33 Rick Austin; 49 Mark Ballinger; 44 Vince Colbert; 46 Steve Dunning; 47 Ed Farmer; 32 Alan Foster; 45 Rich Hand; 34 Steve Hargan; 38 Phil Hennigan; 51 Bob Kaiser; 30 Ray Lamb; 50 Chuck Machemehl; 48 Sam McDowell; 31 Steve Mingori; 36 Camilo Pascual; 39 Mike Paul | Catchers: 8 Ray Fosse; 7 Ken Suarez; Infielders: 25 Kurt Bevacqua; 16 Larry Brown; 17 Lou Camilli; 14 Chris Chambliss; 40 Ken Harrelson; 18 Jack Heidemann; 23 Chuck Hinton; 10 Gomer Hodge; 24 Eddie Leon; 29 John Lowenstein; 12 Graig Nettles; 16 Fred Stanley | Outfielders: 21 Frank Baker; 25 Buddy Bradford; 40 Jim Clark; 22 Ted Ford; 27 Roy Foster; 28 Vada Pinson; 11 Ted Uhlaender | Manager: 1 Alvin Dark (Apr 6 - Jul 28); 4 Johnny Lipon (Jul 29 - Sep 29); Coaches: 2 Cot Deal (Pitching); 3 Kerby Farrell (Bench); 6 Bobby Hofman (Third Base); 4 Johnny Lipon (First Base) |

== Player stats ==
=== Batting ===
Note: G = Games played; AB = At bats; R = Runs; H = Hits; 2B = Doubles; 3B = Triples; HR = Home runs; RBI = Run batted in; AVG = Batting average; SB = Stolen bases

| Player | G | AB | R | H | 2B | 3B | HR | RBI | AVG | SB |
|---|---|---|---|---|---|---|---|---|---|---|
| Rick Austin | 23 | 1 | 0 | 0 | 0 | 0 | 0 | 0 | .000 | 0 |
| Frank Baker | 73 | 181 | 18 | 38 | 12 | 1 | 1 | 23 | .210 | 1 |
| Mark Ballinger | 18 | 5 | 1 | 1 | 0 | 0 | 0 | 0 | .200 | 0 |
| Kurt Bevacqua | 55 | 137 | 9 | 28 | 3 | 1 | 3 | 13 | .204 | 0 |
| Buddy Bradford | 20 | 38 | 4 | 6 | 2 | 1 | 0 | 3 | .158 | 0 |
| Larry Brown | 13 | 50 | 4 | 11 | 1 | 0 | 0 | 5 | .220 | 0 |
| Lou Camilli | 39 | 81 | 5 | 16 | 2 | 0 | 0 | 0 | .198 | 0 |
| Chris Chambliss | 111 | 415 | 49 | 114 | 20 | 4 | 9 | 48 | .275 | 2 |
| Jim Clark | 13 | 18 | 2 | 3 | 0 | 1 | 0 | 0 | .167 | 0 |
| Vince Colbert | 52 | 29 | 3 | 4 | 1 | 0 | 0 | 0 | .138 | 0 |
| Steve Dunning | 32 | 55 | 5 | 10 | 1 | 0 | 1 | 7 | .182 | 0 |
| Ed Farmer | 43 | 14 | 0 | 1 | 0 | 0 | 0 | 0 | .071 | 0 |
| Ted Ford | 74 | 196 | 15 | 38 | 6 | 0 | 2 | 14 | .194 | 2 |
| Ray Fosse | 133 | 486 | 53 | 134 | 21 | 1 | 12 | 62 | .276 | 4 |
| Alan Foster | 37 | 51 | 2 | 2 | 1 | 0 | 0 | 3 | .039 | 0 |
| Roy Foster | 125 | 396 | 51 | 97 | 21 | 1 | 18 | 45 | .245 | 6 |
| Rich Hand | 16 | 16 | 1 | 2 | 0 | 0 | 0 | 0 | .125 | 0 |
| Steve Hargan | 37 | 32 | 0 | 2 | 0 | 0 | 0 | 0 | .063 | 0 |
| Ken Harrelson | 52 | 161 | 20 | 32 | 2 | 0 | 5 | 14 | .199 | 1 |
| Jack Heidemann | 81 | 240 | 16 | 50 | 7 | 0 | 0 | 9 | .208 | 1 |
| Phil Hennigan | 57 | 6 | 0 | 0 | 0 | 0 | 0 | 0 | .000 | 0 |
| Chuck Hinton | 88 | 147 | 13 | 33 | 7 | 0 | 5 | 14 | .224 | 0 |
| Gomer Hodge | 80 | 83 | 3 | 17 | 3 | 0 | 1 | 9 | .205 | 0 |
| Bob Kaiser | 5 | 0 | 0 | 0 | 0 | 0 | 0 | 0 | — | 0 |
| Ray Lamb | 43 | 43 | 3 | 4 | 0 | 0 | 0 | 0 | .093 | 0 |
| Eddie Leon | 131 | 429 | 35 | 112 | 12 | 2 | 4 | 35 | .261 | 3 |
| John Lowenstein | 58 | 140 | 15 | 26 | 5 | 0 | 4 | 9 | .186 | 1 |
| Chuck Machemehl | 14 | 2 | 0 | 1 | 0 | 0 | 0 | 0 | .500 | 0 |
| Sam McDowell | 35 | 73 | 1 | 13 | 0 | 0 | 0 | 4 | .178 | 0 |
| Steve Mingori | 54 | 2 | 0 | 1 | 0 | 0 | 0 | 0 | .500 | 0 |
| Graig Nettles | 158 | 598 | 78 | 156 | 18 | 1 | 28 | 86 | .261 | 7 |
| Camilo Pascual | 9 | 5 | 0 | 3 | 1 | 0 | 0 | 0 | .600 | 0 |
| Mike Paul | 17 | 19 | 1 | 1 | 0 | 0 | 0 | 0 | .053 | 0 |
| Vada Pinson | 146 | 566 | 60 | 149 | 23 | 4 | 11 | 35 | .263 | 25 |
| Fred Stanley | 60 | 129 | 14 | 29 | 4 | 0 | 2 | 12 | .225 | 1 |
| Ken Suarez | 50 | 123 | 10 | 25 | 7 | 0 | 1 | 9 | .203 | 0 |
| Ted Uhlaender | 141 | 500 | 52 | 144 | 20 | 3 | 2 | 47 | .288 | 3 |
| Team totals | 162 | 5467 | 543 | 1303 | 200 | 20 | 109 | 507 | .238 | 57 |

=== Pitching ===
Note: W = Wins; L = Losses; ERA = Earned run average; G = Games pitched; GS = Games started; SV = Saves; IP = Innings pitched; H = Hits allowed; R = Runs allowed; ER = Earned runs allowed; BB = Walks allowed; K = Strikeouts

| Player | W | L | ERA | G | GS | SV | IP | H | R | ER | BB | K |
|---|---|---|---|---|---|---|---|---|---|---|---|---|
| Rick Austin | 0 | 0 | 5.09 | 23 | 0 | 1 | 23.0 | 25 | 15 | 13 | 20 | 20 |
| Mark Ballinger | 1 | 2 | 4.67 | 18 | 0 | 0 | 34.2 | 30 | 21 | 18 | 13 | 25 |
| Vince Colbert | 7 | 6 | 3.97 | 50 | 10 | 2 | 142.2 | 140 | 71 | 63 | 71 | 74 |
| Steve Dunning | 8 | 14 | 4.50 | 31 | 29 | 1 | 184.0 | 173 | 98 | 92 | 109 | 132 |
| Ed Farmer | 5 | 4 | 4.35 | 43 | 4 | 4 | 78.2 | 77 | 42 | 38 | 41 | 48 |
| Alan Foster | 8 | 12 | 4.16 | 36 | 26 | 0 | 181.2 | 158 | 93 | 84 | 82 | 97 |
| Rich Hand | 2 | 6 | 5.79 | 15 | 12 | 0 | 60.2 | 74 | 43 | 39 | 38 | 26 |
| Steve Hargan | 1 | 13 | 6.19 | 37 | 16 | 1 | 113.1 | 138 | 83 | 78 | 56 | 52 |
| Phil Hennigan | 4 | 3 | 4.94 | 57 | 0 | 14 | 82.0 | 80 | 45 | 45 | 51 | 69 |
| Bob Kaiser | 0 | 0 | 4.50 | 5 | 0 | 0 | 6.0 | 8 | 3 | 3 | 3 | 4 |
| Ray Lamb | 6 | 12 | 3.35 | 43 | 21 | 1 | 158.1 | 147 | 67 | 59 | 69 | 91 |
| Chuck Machemehl | 0 | 2 | 6.38 | 14 | 0 | 3 | 18.1 | 16 | 16 | 13 | 15 | 9 |
| Sam McDowell | 13 | 17 | 3.40 | 35 | 31 | 1 | 214.2 | 160 | 89 | 81 | 153 | 192 |
| Steve Mingori | 1 | 2 | 1.43 | 54 | 0 | 4 | 56.2 | 31 | 10 | 9 | 24 | 45 |
| Camilo Pascual | 2 | 2 | 3.09 | 9 | 1 | 0 | 23.1 | 17 | 9 | 8 | 11 | 20 |
| Mike Paul | 2 | 7 | 5.95 | 17 | 12 | 0 | 62.0 | 78 | 42 | 41 | 14 | 33 |
| Team totals | 60 | 102 | 4.28 | 162 | 162 | 32 | 1440.0 | 1352 | 747 | 684 | 770 | 937 |

== Awards and honors ==
- All-Star Game
- Ray Fosse, Gold Glove Award

== Farm system ==
| Level | Team | League | Manager |
|---|---|---|---|
| AAA | Wichita Aeros | American Association | Ken Aspromonte |
| AA | Jacksonville Suns | Southern League | Ray Hathaway |
| A | Reno Silver Sox | California League | Pinky May |
| Rookie | GCL Indians | Gulf Coast League | Len Johnston |
