= 1970 Cleveland Indians season =

1970 Cleveland Indians
- League: American League
- Division: East
- Ballpark: Cleveland Municipal Stadium
- City: Cleveland, Ohio
- Owners: Vernon Stouffer
- General managers: Alvin Dark
- Managers: Alvin Dark
- Television: WJW-TV
- Radio: WERE (1300)

The 1970 Cleveland Indians season was the 70th season for the franchise. The club finished in fifth place in the American League East with a record of 76 wins and 86 losses.

== Offseason ==
- December 5, 1969: Horacio Piña, Ron Law and Dave Nelson were traded by the Indians to the Washington Senators for Dennis Higgins and Barry Moore.
- December 10, 1969: Luis Tiant and Stan Williams were traded by the Indians to the Minnesota Twins for Dean Chance, Bob Miller, Ted Uhlaender, and Graig Nettles.
- January 17, 1970: Chris Chambliss was drafted by the Indians in the 1st round (1st pick) of the 1970 Major League Baseball draft.

== Regular season ==
=== Season standings ===
AL East
Team	W	L	Pct.	GB	Home	Road
Baltimore Orioles	108	54	.667	—	59‍–‍22	49‍–‍32
New York Yankees	93	69	.574	15	53‍–‍28	40‍–‍41
Boston Red Sox	87	75	.537	21	52‍–‍29	35‍–‍46
Detroit Tigers	79	83	.488	29	42‍–‍39	37‍–‍44
Cleveland Indians	76	86	.469	32	43‍–‍38	33‍–‍48
Washington Senators	70	92	.432	38	40‍–‍41	30‍–‍51

=== Record vs. opponents ===
1970 American League record Sources:
Team	BAL	BOS	CAL	CWS	CLE	DET	KC	MIL	MIN	NYY	OAK	WAS
Baltimore	—	13–5	7–5	9–3	14–4	11–7	12–0	7–5	5–7	11–7	7–5	12–6
Boston	5–13	—	5–7	8–4	12–6	9–9	7–5	5–7	7–5	10–8	7–5	12–6
California	5–7	7–5	—	12–6	6–6	6–6	10–8	12–6	8–10	5–7	8–10	7–5
Chicago	3–9	4–8	6–12	—	6–6	6–6	7–11	7–11	6–12	5–7	2–16	4–8
Cleveland	4–14	6–12	6–6	6–6	—	7–11	8–4	7–5	6–6	8–10	7–5	11–7
Detroit	7–11	9–9	6–6	6–6	11–7	—	6–6	8–4	4–8	7–11	6–6	9–9
Kansas City	0–12	5–7	8–10	11–7	4–8	6–6	—	12–6	5–13	1–11	7–11	6–6
Milwaukee	5–7	7–5	6–12	11–7	5–7	4–8	6–12	—	5–13	3–9–1	8–10	5–7
Minnesota	7–5	5–7	10–8	12–6	6–6	8–4	13–5	13–5	—	5–7	13–5	6–6
New York	7–11	8–10	7–5	7–5	10–8	11–7	11–1	9–3–1	7–5	—	6–6	10–8
Oakland	5–7	5–7	10–8	16–2	5–7	6–6	11–7	10–8	5–13	6–6	—	10–2
Washington	6–12	6–12	5–7	8–4	7–11	9–9	6–6	7–5	6–6	8–10	2–10	—

=== Notable transactions ===
- June 4, 1970: 1970 Major League Baseball draft
  - Tommy Smith was drafted by the Indians in the 5th round.
  - Dennis Kinney was drafted by the Indians in the 10th round.
- August 11, 1970: Lou Klimchock was released by the Indians.

=== Opening Day Lineup ===
Opening Day Starters
#	Name	Position
22	Ted Ford	RF
26	Ted Uhlaender	CF
27	Roy Foster	LF
11	Tony Horton	1B
8	Ray Fosse	C
18	Jack Heidemann	SS
12	Graig Nettles	3B
24	Eddie Leon	2B
48	Sam McDowell	P

=== Roster ===
1970 Cleveland Indians
Roster
Pitchers: 33 Rick Austin; 32 Dean Chance; 44 Vince Colbert; 46 Steve Dunning; 42 Dick Ellsworth; 45 Rich Hand; 34 Steve Hargan; 38 Phil Hennigan; 35 Dennis Higgins; 36 Fred Lasher; 48 Sam McDowell; 33 Bob Miller; 31 Steve Mingori; 31 Barry Moore; 39 Mike Paul; 42 Jim Rittwage	Catchers: 8 Ray Fosse; 9 Duke Sims; Infielders: 16 Larry Brown; 17 Lou Camilli; 13 Vern Fuller; 40 Ken Harrelson; 18 Jack Heidemann; 23 Chuck Hinton; 11 Tony Horton; 29 Lou Klimchock; 24 Eddie Leon; 29 John Lowenstein; 12 Graig Nettles; 10 Rich Rollins	Outfielders: 25 Buddy Bradford; 22 Ted Ford; 27 Roy Foster; 25 Russ Nagelson; 28 Vada Pinson; 26 Ted Uhlaender	Manager: 5,1 Alvin Dark; Coaches: 2 Cot Deal (Pitching); 14 Hoot Evers (Bench); 3 Kerby Farrell (First Base); 4 Johnny Lipon (Third Base)

== Player stats ==
=== Batting ===
Note: G = Games played; AB = At bats; R = Runs scored; H = Hits; 2B = Doubles; 3B = Triples; HR = Home runs; RBI = Runs batted in; AVG = Batting Average; SB = Stolen bases

Player	G	AB	R	H	2B	3B	HR	RBI	AVG	SB
Rick Austin	31	18	0	2	1	0	0	0	.111	0
Buddy Bradford	75	163	25	32	6	1	7	23	.196	0
Larry Brown	72	155	17	40	5	2	0	15	.258	1
Lou Camilli	16	15	0	0	0	0	0	0	.000	0
Dean Chance	45	42	1	3	0	0	0	3	.071	0
Vince Colbert	23	2	0	0	0	0	0	0	.000	0
Steve Dunning	19	31	0	5	0	0	0	1	.161	0
Dick Ellsworth	29	4	0	0	0	0	0	0	.000	0
Ted Ford	26	46	5	8	1	0	1	1	.174	0
Ray Fosse	120	450	62	138	17	1	18	61	.307	1
Roy Foster	139	477	66	128	26	0	23	60	.268	3
Vern Fuller	29	33	3	6	2	0	1	2	.182	0
Rich Hand	35	41	2	6	0	0	0	5	.146	0
Steve Hargan	28	45	4	5	1	0	0	0	.111	0
Ken Harrelson	17	39	3	11	1	0	1	1	.282	0
Jack Heidemann	133	445	44	94	14	2	6	37	.211	2
Phil Hennigan	42	7	1	1	1	0	0	1	.143	0
Dennis Higgins	58	12	1	3	0	0	0	1	.250	0
Chuck Hinton	107	195	24	62	4	0	9	29	.318	0
Tony Horton	115	413	48	111	19	3	17	59	.269	3
Lou Klimchock	41	56	5	9	0	0	1	2	.161	0
Fred Lasher	43	8	0	0	0	0	0	0	.000	0
Eddie Leon	152	549	58	136	20	4	10	56	.248	1
John Lowenstein	17	43	5	11	3	1	1	6	.256	1
Sam McDowell	40	105	5	13	0	0	1	2	.124	0
Bob Miller	15	5	0	1	0	0	0	0	.200	0
Steve Mingori	21	1	0	0	0	0	0	0	.000	0
Barry Moore	13	21	1	2	0	0	0	0	.095	0
Russ Nagelson	17	24	3	3	1	0	1	2	.125	0
Graig Nettles	157	549	81	129	13	1	26	62	.235	3
Mike Paul	30	26	2	4	0	0	0	0	.154	0
Vada Pinson	148	574	74	164	28	6	24	82	.286	7
Jim Rittwage	8	8	1	3	1	0	0	0	.375	0
Rich Rollins	42	43	6	10	0	0	2	4	.233	0
Duke Sims	110	345	46	91	12	0	23	56	.264	0
Ted Uhlaender	141	473	56	127	21	2	11	46	.268	3
Team totals	162	5463	649	1358	197	23	183	617	.249	25

=== Pitching ===
Note: W = Wins; L = Losses; ERA = Earned run average; G = Games pitched; GS = Games started; SV = Saves; IP = Innings pitched; H = Hits allowed; R = Runs allowed; ER = Earned runs allowed; BB = Walks allowed; K = Strikeouts

Player	W	L	ERA	G	GS	SV	IP	H	R	ER	BB	K
Rick Austin	2	5	4.79	31	8	3	67.2	74	36	36	26	53
Dean Chance	9	8	4.24	45	19	4	155.0	172	80	73	59	109
Vince Colbert	1	1	7.26	23	0	2	31.0	37	25	25	16	17
Steve Dunning	4	9	4.96	19	17	0	94.1	93	55	52	54	77
Dick Ellsworth	3	3	4.53	29	1	2	43.2	49	23	22	14	13
Rich Hand	6	13	3.83	35	25	3	159.2	132	71	68	69	110
Steve Hargan	11	3	2.90	23	19	0	142.2	101	47	46	53	72
Phil Hennigan	6	3	4.02	42	1	3	71.2	69	34	32	44	43
Dennis Higgins	4	6	3.99	58	0	11	90.1	82	43	40	54	82
Fred Lasher	1	7	4.06	43	1	5	57.2	57	34	26	30	44
Sam McDowell	20	12	2.92	39	39	0	305.0	236	108	99	131	304
Bob Miller	2	2	4.18	15	2	1	28.0	35	14	13	15	15
Steve Mingori	1	0	2.66	21	0	1	20.1	17	8	6	12	16
Barry Moore	3	5	4.22	13	12	0	70.1	70	34	33	46	35
Mike Paul	2	8	4.81	30	15	0	88.0	91	51	47	45	70
Jim Rittwage	1	1	4.15	8	3	0	26.0	18	12	12	21	16
Team totals	76	86	3.91	162	162	35	1451.1	1333	675	630	689	1076

== Award winners ==
- Ray Fosse, Gold Glove Award
- All-Star Game

== Farm system ==
Level	Team	League	Manager
AAA	Wichita Aeros	American Association	Ken Aspromonte
AA	Savannah Indians	Southern League	Ray Hathaway
A	Reno Silver Sox	California League	Pinky May
A	Sumter Indians	Western Carolinas League	Len Johnston
Rookie	GCL Indians	Gulf Coast League	Joe Lutz
