= 1971 New York Yankees season =

Season for the Major League Baseball team the New York Yankees

1971 New York Yankees
- League: American League
- Division: East
- Ballpark: Yankee Stadium
- City: New York City
- Record: 82-80 (.506)
- Owners: CBS
- General managers: Lee MacPhail
- Managers: Ralph Houk
- Television: WPIX (Phil Rizzuto, Frank Messer, Bill White, Whitey Ford)
- Radio: WMCA (Frank Messer, Phil Rizzuto, Bill White)

The 1971 New York Yankees season was the 69th season for the franchise. The team finished fourth in the American League East with a record of 82–80, 21 games behind the Baltimore Orioles. New York was managed by Ralph Houk. The Yankees played their home games at Yankee Stadium.

== Offseason ==
- March 31, 1971: Pete Ward was released by the Yankees.

== Regular season ==
=== Season standings ===
AL East
Team	W	L	Pct.	GB	Home	Road
Baltimore Orioles	101	57	.639	—	53‍–‍24	48‍–‍33
Detroit Tigers	91	71	.562	12	54‍–‍27	37‍–‍44
Boston Red Sox	85	77	.525	18	47‍–‍33	38‍–‍44
New York Yankees	82	80	.506	21	44‍–‍37	38‍–‍43
Washington Senators	63	96	.396	38½	35‍–‍46	28‍–‍50
Cleveland Indians	60	102	.370	43	29‍–‍52	31‍–‍50

=== Record vs. opponents ===
1971 American League record Sources:
Team	BAL	BOS	CAL	CWS	CLE	DET	KC	MIL	MIN	NYY	OAK	WAS
Baltimore	—	9–9	7–5	8–4	13–5	8–10	6–5	9–3	10–2	11–7	7–4	13–3
Boston	9–9	—	6–6	10–2	11–7	12–6	1–11	6–6	8–4	7–11	3–9	12–6
California	5–7	6–6	—	8–10	8–4	6–6	8–10	6–12	12–6	6–6	7–11	4–8
Chicago	4–8	2–10	10–8	—	3–9	7–5	9–9	11–7	7–11	5–7	11–7	10–2
Cleveland	5–13	7–11	4–8	9–3	—	6–12	2–10	4–8	4–8	8–10	4–8	7–11
Detroit	10–8	6–12	6–6	5–7	12–6	—	8–4	10–2	6–6	10–8	4–8	14–4
Kansas City	5–6	11–1	10–8	9–9	10–2	4–8	—	8–10	9–9	5–7	5–13	9–3
Milwaukee	3–9	6–6	12–6	7–11	8–4	2–10	10–8	—	10–7	2–10	3–15	6–6
Minnesota	2–10	4–8	6–12	11–7	8–4	6–6	9–9	7–10	—	8–4	8–10	5–6
New York	7–11	11–7	6–6	7–5	10–8	8–10	7–5	10–2	4–8	—	5–7	7–11
Oakland	4–7	9–3	11–7	7–11	8–4	8–4	13–5	15–3	10–8	7–5	—	9–3
Washington	3–13	6–12	8–4	2–10	11–7	4–14	3–9	6–6	6–5	11–7	3–9	—

=== Notable transactions ===
- April 9, 1971: Ron Klimkowski and Rob Gardner was traded by the Yankees to the Oakland Athletics for Felipe Alou.
- May 26, 1971: Curt Blefary was traded by the Yankees to the Oakland Athletics for Rob Gardner.
- May 28, 1971: Bill Burbach was traded by the Yankees to the Baltimore Orioles for Jim Hardin.
- June 7, 1971: Frank Tepedino and Bobby Mitchell were traded by the Yankees to the Milwaukee Brewers for Danny Walton.
- June 8, 1971: 1971 Major League Baseball draft
  - Larry Murray was drafted by the Yankees in the 5th round.
  - Mike Pazik was drafted by the Yankees in the 1st round (13th pick) of the Secondary Phase.
- June 25, 1971: Ron Woods was traded by the Yankees to the Montreal Expos for Ron Swoboda.
- July 17, 1971: Bobby Cox was signed as a free agent by the Yankees.
- August 28, 1971: Bobby Cox was released by the Yankees.

=== Roster ===
1971 New York Yankees
Roster
Pitchers: 22 Jack Aker; 45 Stan Bahnsen; 50 Bill Burbach; 50 Al Closter; 39,43 Rob Gardner; 46 Roger Hambright; 29 Jim Hardin; 39 Gary Jones; 18 Mike Kekich; 38 Steve Kline; 43 Terry Ley; 40 Lindy McDaniel; 19 Fritz Peterson; 30 Mel Stottlemyre; 54 Gary Waslewski	Catchers: 41 Jake Gibbs; 15 Thurman Munson; Infielders: 26 Frank Baker; 25 Len Boehmer; 10 Danny Cater; 20 Horace Clarke; 23 John Ellis; 28 Ron Hansen; 2 Jerry Kenney; 17 Gene Michael	Outfielders: 24 Felipe Alou; 13 Curt Blefary; 12 Ron Blomberg; 27 Jim Lyttle; 1 Bobby Murcer; 14 Ron Swoboda; 21 Frank Tepedino; 21 Rusty Torres; 21 Danny Walton; 6 Roy White; 9 Ron Woods	Manager: 35 Ralph Houk; Coaches: 44 Jim Hegan; 32 Elston Howard; 34 Dick Howser; 31 Jim Turner

== Player stats ==
=== Batting ===
==== Starters by position ====
Note: Pos = Position; G = Games played; AB = At bats; H = Hits; Avg. = Batting average; HR = Home runs; RBI = Runs batted in

Pos	Player	G	AB	H	Avg.	HR	RBI
C	Thurman Munson	125	451	113	.251	10	42
1B	Danny Cater	121	428	118	.276	4	50
2B	Horace Clarke	159	625	156	.250	2	41
3B	Jerry Kenney	120	325	85	.262	0	20
SS	Gene Michael	139	456	102	.224	3	35
LF	Roy White	147	524	153	.292	19	84
CF	Bobby Murcer	146	529	175	.331	25	94
RF	Felipe Alou	131	461	133	.289	8	69

==== Other batters ====
Note: G = Games played; AB = At bats; H = Hits; Avg. = Batting average; HR = Home runs; RBI = Runs batted in

Player	G	AB	H	Avg.	HR	RBI
John Ellis	83	238	58	.244	3	34
Jake Gibbs	70	206	45	.218	5	21
Ron Blomberg	64	199	64	.322	7	31
Ron Hansen	61	145	30	.207	2	20
Ron Swoboda	54	138	36	.261	2	20
Jim Lyttle	49	86	17	.198	1	7
Frank Baker	43	79	11	.139	0	2
Curt Blefary	21	36	7	.194	1	2
Ron Woods	25	32	8	.250	1	2
Rusty Torres	9	26	10	.385	2	3
Danny Walton	5	14	2	.143	1	2
Frank Tepedino	6	6	0	.000	0	0
Len Boehmer	3	5	0	.000	0	0

=== Pitching ===
==== Starting pitchers ====
Note: G = Games pitched; IP = Innings pitched; W = Wins; L = Losses; ERA = Earned run average; SO = Strikeouts

Player	G	IP	W	L	ERA	SO
Fritz Peterson	37	274.0	15	13	3.05	139
Mel Stottlemyre	35	269.2	16	12	2.87	132
Stan Bahnsen	36	242.0	14	12	3.35	110
Steve Kline	31	222.1	12	13	2.96	81

==== Other pitchers ====
Note: G = Games pitched; IP = Innings pitched; W = Wins; L = Losses; ERA = Earned run average; SO = Strikeouts

Player	G	IP	W	L	ERA	SO
Mike Kekich	37	170.1	10	9	4.07	93
Jim Hardin	12	28.1	0	2	5.08	14

==== Relief pitchers ====
Note: G = Games pitched; W = Wins; L = Losses; SV = Saves; ERA = Earned run average; SO = Strikeouts

Player	G	W	L	SV	ERA	SO
Lindy McDaniel	44	5	10	4	5.04	39
Jack Aker	41	4	4	4	2.59	24
Gary Waslewski	24	0	1	1	3.28	17
Roger Hambright	18	3	1	2	4.39	14
Al Closter	14	2	2	0	5.08	22
Gary Jones	12	0	0	0	9.00	10
Terry Ley	6	0	0	0	10.80	3
Bill Burbach	2	0	1	0	10.80	3
Rob Gardner	2	0	0	0	3.00	2

== Awards and honors ==
- Outfielder Bobby Murcer competed in his first All-Star Game

== Farm system ==
Level	Team	League	Manager
AAA	Syracuse Chiefs	International League	Loren Babe
AA	Manchester Yankees	Eastern League	Mickey Vernon
A	Kinston Eagles	Carolina League	Gene Hassell
A	Fort Lauderdale Yankees	Florida State League	Bobby Cox
A-Short Season	Oneonta Yankees	New York–Penn League	George Case
Rookie	Johnson City Yankees	Appalachian League	Jerry Walker

LEAGUE CHAMPIONS: Oneonta
