= Pedro García (baseball) =

Puerto Rican baseball player (born 1950)

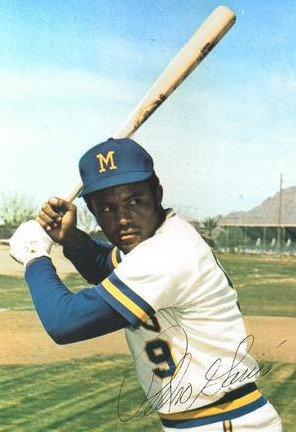
- García in 1973
- Second baseman
- Born: April 17, 1950 (age 75); Guayama, Puerto Rico
- Batted: Right Threw: Right

MLB debut
- April 6, 1973, for the Milwaukee Brewers

Last MLB appearance
- June 8, 1977, for the Toronto Blue Jays

MLB statistics
- Batting average: .220
- Home runs: 37
- Runs batted in: 184
- Stats at Baseball Reference

Teams
- Milwaukee Brewers (1973–1976); Detroit Tigers (1976); Toronto Blue Jays (1977)

Career highlights and awards
- Led AL in doubles in 1973 with 32

Pedro Modesto García (born April 17, 1950) is a Puerto Rican former professional baseball second baseman. He played in Major League Baseball (MLB) for the Milwaukee Brewers, Detroit Tigers, and Toronto Blue Jays.

== Career ==
=== Milwaukee Brewers (1973-1976) ===
Garcia signed as an amateur free agent with the Seattle Pilots in 1969, but did not appear with the franchise before it became the Milwaukee Brewers in 1970.

With the departure of Ron Theobald, Garcia was named the Brewers' starting second baseman for the 1973 season, and made his Major League debut on April 6, going hitless in three at-bats against Dave McNally in a 10-0 loss to the Baltimore Orioles. Garcia earned his first career hit the next day, a home run against the Orioles' Mike Cuellar in an extra inning 8-7 loss.

As a rookie, Garcia hit .245 with 15 HR and 54 RBI in 160 games, as well as leading the American League with 32 doubles, as he finished second in American League Rookie of the Year voting to Al Bumbry of the Baltimore Orioles. Garcia also led all AL second basemen with 27 errors.

In 1974, Garcia batted .199 with 12 HR and 54 RBI in 147 games.

In 1975, Garcia lost playing time to Kurt Bevacqua and Bob Sheldon, appearing in only 98 games, hitting .225 with 6 HR and 38 RBI, although he tied Robin Yount for the team high in stolen bases with 12. Garcia also led the American League with a .985 fielding percentage at second base.

Garcia began the 1976 season with the Brewers, where in 41 games, he hit .217 with one home run and 9 RBI. On June 10, the Brewers traded Garcia to the Detroit Tigers for Gary Sutherland.

=== Detroit Tigers (1976) ===
Garcia finished the 1976 season with the Detroit Tigers, as he played in 77 games, hitting only .198 with 3 HR and 20 RBI. Garcia also committed a combined 22 errors with the Tigers and Milwaukee Brewers in 1976 to finish with the second highest total among second basemen. On December 16, the Tigers released Garcia.

=== Toronto Blue Jays (1977) ===
Garcia signed as a free agent with the expansion Toronto Blue Jays on January 3, 1977, and was their opening day second baseman on April 7. Garcia had three hits in the Blue Jays' opening day victory over the Chicago White Sox, and was able to parlay this strong start into a gig as the Blue Jays' regular second baseman through April, and again from May 9 through 25. However he struggled at both the plate and in the field, and after May 25 was reduced to very occasional pinch-running and DH appearances. He was released on June 27, becoming the first opening day Blue Jay to end his major league career. In 41 games, he hit .208 with no home runs and 9 RBI.

=== Later career ===
After his time with Toronto, Garcia signed with the San Diego Padres on July 5, 1977, but he spent the rest of the 1977 and 1978 seasons with their AAA affiliate, the Hawaii Islanders. Garcia played with the Poza Rica Petroleros of the Mexican League in 1979, as well as the Mexico City Diablos Rojos in 1982.

== See also ==
- List of Major League Baseball annual doubles leaders
