= Darren Ford =

American baseball player (born 1985)

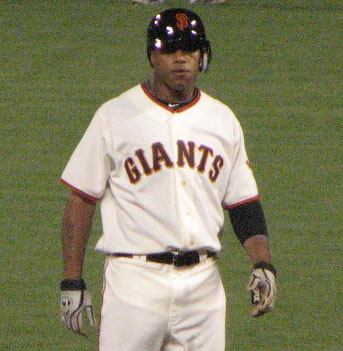
- Ford with the San Francisco Giants in 2010
- Center fielder
- Born: October 1, 1985 (age 41); Vineland, New Jersey, U.S.
- Batted: Right Threw: Right

MLB debut
- September 1, 2010, for the San Francisco Giants

Last MLB appearance
- September 24, 2011, for the San Francisco Giants

MLB statistics
- Batting average: .286
- Home runs: 0
- Runs batted in: 0
- Stats at Baseball Reference

Teams
- San Francisco Giants (2010–2011)

Darren Scott Ford (born October 1, 1985), nicknamed "the Bullet", is an American former professional baseball center fielder. He is the grandson of Ted Ford, who played in the majors in the early 1970s. He played 33 games for the San Francisco Giants of Major League Baseball (MLB) in 2010 and 2011, used most often as a pinch runner.

Born and raised in Vineland, New Jersey, Ford starred playing baseball and football at Vineland High School. Selected by the Milwaukee Brewers in the 18th round (526th overall) of the 2004 MLB draft, he played in their minor league system until 2008, when he was traded to the Giants for Ray Durham. Called up by San Francisco in late 2010, he scored the winning run in the eighth inning of a game against the Colorado Rockies in his September 1 debut. Though not on the roster when the team won the 2010 World Series, he travelled with the Giants throughout the playoffs, in case an injury necessitated his addition to the roster. He played 26 games with the Giants in 2011 before spraining his ankle in late May.

Released following the 2011 season, Ford spent 2012 in the Seattle Mariners organization and 2013 in the Pittsburgh Pirates organization before rejoining the Giants system from 2014 through 2016. He then played with Atlantic League teams from 2017 through 2019, set to return for a fourth year in 2020 before the league's season was cancelled due to COVID-19.

== Early life and education ==
Darren Scott Ford was born on October 1, 1985, in Vineland, New Jersey. Because his father was absent from the home, his mother, Carla, was his primary caregiver during his childhood. Ford played for the South Vineland Little League organization during his youth, helping them reach the Junior League World Series in 2000 and the Senior League World Series in 2002. He attended Vineland High School, where he was a "standout baseball and football player" and one of the best high school athletes in the state of New Jersey, according to The Press of Atlantic City.

As a senior at Vineland High, he batted .326 with 31 runs scored and 38 stolen bases in 39 attempts, helping Vineland reach the South Jersey Group IV final before losing to Toms River East High School. Playing running back on the football team, he rushed for 11 touchdowns and 827 yards, also returning two kickoffs for touchdowns and catching three touchdown passes. On the indoor track and field team, he won the Group IV 55-meter dash. Ford chose to pursue a baseball career, signing with the Milwaukee Brewers, who selected him in the 18th round (526th overall) of the 2004 Major League Baseball draft.

== Professional career ==
=== Milwaukee Brewers (2005–2008) ===
A draft-and-follow pick, Ford played one season of baseball at Chipola College before beginning his professional career in 2005 with the Rookie-level Helena Brewers. In 61 games that year, he hit .271 with one home run and 24 runs batted in (RBI). He and Dexter Fowler tied for ninth in the Pioneer League with 18 stolen bases. In 2006, Ford played in 125 games for the Single–A West Virginia Power, hitting .283 with seven home runs, 54 RBI and 69 stolen bases. He ranked second in the South Atlantic League in stolen bases, behind only Eric Young Jr., who stole 87.

Ford split the 2007 season between West Virginia and the High–A Brevard County Manatees, hitting a combined .278 with nine home runs, 60 RBIs, and 67 stolen bases. He began the 2008 season with the Manatees.

=== San Francisco Giants (2008–2011) ===
On July 20, 2008, he was traded to the San Francisco Giants alongside minor leaguer Steve Hammond in exchange for Ray Durham.

Ford finished the 2008 season with the High–A San Jose Giants. He hit a combined .227 with two home runs, 34 RBI, and 62 stolen bases between Brevard County and San Jose that season. Although he had only played 91 games with Brevard County, Ford's 48 stolen bases in the Florida State League were topped only by Quintin Berry's 51. Remaining with San Jose in 2009, Ford batted .300 with nine home runs and 50 RBI. His 35 stolen bases ranked fourth in the California League, behind Tyson Gillies's 44, Trayvon Robinson's 43, and Elián Herrera's 42. San Jose won the California League championship, defeating the High Desert Mavericks three games to none in the finals. On November 20, 2009, the Giants added Ford to their 40-man roster to protect him from the Rule 5 Draft.

Ford played 113 games during the 2010 season for the Double–A Richmond Flying Squirrels, hitting .251 with five home runs and 40 RBI. His 37 stolen bases were second in the Eastern League to Darin Mastroianni's 46. On September 1, 2010, when Major League Baseball (MLB) rosters expanded, Ford was promoted to the major leagues for the first time. The Giants were battling the San Diego Padres for the National League (NL) West title, and they hoped Ford's speed could help them in the remainder of the season. A delayed flight caused him to miss his connection, and he did not join the Giants until the second inning of that day's game against the Colorado Rockies. Inserted as a pinch runner in the bottom of the eighth inning with the score tied at one, he advanced to second base on a bunt-and-run play, reached third base on a wild pitch that landed only a few feet away from catcher Miguel Olivo, and scored what would be the game-winning run when Olivo overthrew third base on the play. "I'll say this, the kid didn't hesitate. He can fly. That's a great call-up. He comes up and helps us win the game. He showed no fear up there," said Giants manager Bruce Bochy. He played seven games for the Giants in 2010, serving as a pinch runner in all except for a game against the Brewers on September 19, when he played the final two innings as a defensive replacement in center field. Though not on the Giants' playoff roster, Ford was in their dugout throughout the 2010 postseason, in case a player had to be removed from the roster due to injury. The Giants won the World Series for the first time since 1954.

After attending spring training with the Giants in 2011, Ford was optioned to the Triple–A Fresno Grizzlies of the Pacific Coast League (PCL) on March 21. He was called up by the Giants on April 15 when Andrés Torres was placed on the disabled list. On April 26, Ford was at third with one out and the game against the Pittsburgh Pirates tied at two. Freddy Sanchez hit a ground ball to Neil Walker, who threw Sanchez out at first. As soon as Walker made the throw, Ford rushed towards home plate. Lyle Overbay made a quick throw to the plate, but Ford slid in safely as Overbay's throw went to the backstop. The Giants went on to win 3–2. Against the Washington Nationals on April 30, Ford recorded his first major league hit, singling off of Tyler Clippard. After getting a hit against Brian Fuentes with one out in the 11th inning of a 4–4 tie against the Oakland Athletics on May 22, Ford scored from second in a close play at the plate on a walk-off RBI single by Emmanuel Burriss. "I don't know who else scores in the game except Darren," observed Bochy. "Anybody else and it's not even close." However, Ford sprained his ankle on the play and went on the disabled list a few days later. He rehabbed in June with the Grizzlies but was optioned to them on June 20. Just seven days later, he went on Fresno's disabled list with a wrist injury. After rehabbing with the Arizona League Giants in early August, he was reassigned to Richmond on August 9. In 18 games for Fresno, he batted .211 with two home runs, seven RBI, and 10 stolen bases. With Richmond in 23 games, he batted .279 with no home runs, two RBI, and six stolen bases. He returned to the Giants in September after rosters expanded and was used mainly as a pinch runner, as well as a defensive replacement three times in center field. In his last game of the year, on September 24, he singled against Zach Duke in his only at bat as the Giants lost 15–2. Playing 26 games for San Francisco, he scored seven runs, recorded four hits in 14 at bats, and stole seven bases, though he was caught stealing five times. He was released in November.

=== Seattle Mariners (2012) ===
The Seattle Mariners signed Ford to a minor league contract on December 1, 2011. Assigned to the PCL's Tacoma Rainiers, he was on the disabled list from April 8 to June 14 with a finger injury. With Tacoma, he had a .273 batting average/.326 on-base percentage/.385 slugging percentage with four home runs, 33 RBI and 26 stolen bases in 70 games. He became a free agent on November 3. Over the 2012–13 offseason, he played for the Leones del Caracas of the Venezuelan Winter League, batting .266 with 24 runs scored, 41 hits, and 11 stolen bases in 36 games.

=== Pittsburgh Pirates (2013) ===
On November 6, 2012, Ford signed a minor league deal with the Pittsburgh Pirates, who assigned him to the Indianapolis Indians of the Triple-A International League. In 83 games, he batted .230 with 36 runs scored, 55 hits, two home runs, 19 RBI, and 29 stolen bases. Following the season, he became a free agent.

=== Second stint with San Francisco Giants (2014–2016) ===
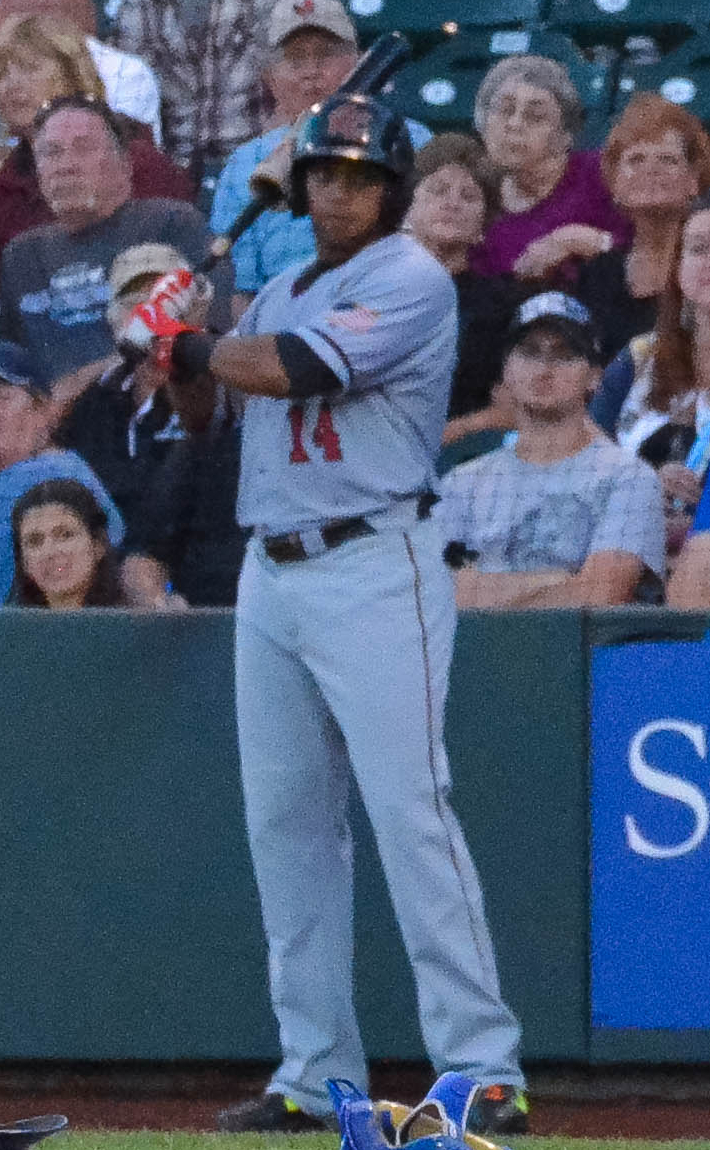
Ford during his tenure with the Sacramento River Cats, the Triple–A affiliate of the Giants, in 2015

On March 8, 2014, Ford signed a minor league contract with the San Francisco Giants. On April 10, during a game between Fresno and the Salt Lake Bees, Ford had to be carted off the field after colliding with the left field wall while chasing a foul ball in the bottom of the eighth inning. He spent three weeks on the disabled list with a concussion and a sprained neck. In 107 games for Fresno, he batted .283 with 48 runs scored, 91 hits, three home runs, 27 RBI, and 35 stolen bases. Reporter Charles Schroeder called 2014 "one of the best years of his professional career." Despite the success, he was not called up by the Giants when rosters expanded in September; San Francisco would have had to add him to the 40–man roster to do so.

Ford again played for the Giants' Triple–A affiliate in 2015, now the Sacramento River Cats. In 110 games (380 at bats), he batted .261 with 54 runs scored, 99 hits, a career-high 11 home runs, 33 RBI, and 33 stolen bases. He started 2016 with Sacramento as well, batting .250 with 17 runs scored, one home run, nine RBI, and eight stolen bases in 49 games. However, on June 8, he was demoted to the Double–A Richmond Flying Squirrels. Spending the rest of the season with the Flying Squirrels, he batted .238 with 36 runs scored, 53 hits, no home runs, 15 RBI, and 13 stolen bases in 70 games. Ford elected free agency following the season on November 7, 2016.

Over the 2016–17 offseason, he played with the Cardenales de Lara of the Venezuelan Winter League, batting .231 with nine hits and two stolen bases in 21 games.

=== Somerset Patriots (2017) ===
On April 4, 2017, Ford signed with the Somerset Patriots of the independent Atlantic League of Professional Baseball. However, he tore his anterior cruciate ligament (ACL) in May, ending his season after playing only 19 games with the team. He batted .243 with 13 runs scored, 17 hits, one home run, 10 RBI, and nine stolen bases.

=== New Britain Bees (2018–2019) ===
On April 26, 2018, Ford signed with the Atlantic League's New Britain Bees. In 122 games (478 at bats), he batted .276 with 74 runs scored, 132 hits, seven home runs, 38 RBI, and 36 stolen bases. Returning to the Bees in 2019, Ford played 121 games (430 at bats), hitting .265 with 81 runs scored, 114 hits, six home runs, and 37 RBI. His 50 stolen bases trailed only Darian Sandford's 74 for the league lead.

When the Bees announced a move to the Futures Collegiate Baseball League for the 2020 season, the Atlantic League held a dispersal draft for players whose rights were controlled by the team. During this draft, Ford was taken by the High Point Rockers. However, the 2020 Atlantic League season was cancelled because of the impact of COVID-19. He became a free agent following the year.

== Coaching career ==
On March 25, 2024, Ford was announced as the manager of the Tupper Lake RiverPigs of the Empire Professional Baseball League.

On February 2nd, 2026, Darren Ford was named the hitting coach of the Great Falls Voyagers, one of the 12 teams making up the Pioneer Baseball League.

== Career statistics ==
Ford played a total of 33 major league games for the Giants: seven in 2010 and 26 in 2011. Most of his appearances were as a pinch runner, utilizing his speed on the base paths. He batted .286 with four hits in 14 at bats, scoring eight runs and stealing nine bases, though he was also caught stealing six times.

== Personal life ==
Ford is good friends with Jeremy Jeffress, his teammate in the Brewers system from 2006 to 2008. During the 2010–11 offseason, he met with Bridgeton Little League coaches to give them advice. He is the grandson of Ted Ford, who played for the Cleveland Indians and the Texas Rangers in the early 1970s. A speedy player, his nickname is "the Bullet".

=== Legal issues ===
On November 18, 2009, Ford told Vineland police that a black or Hispanic male had robbed him at gunpoint of $1,517.08 he was transporting for RK Auto Group, his employer. The following July, after being accused of lying about the incident, he turned himself into police and was charged with making false reports to law enforcement, obstruction of the administration of law, conspiracy, and theft by failure to make proper disposition of property received. In January 2011, officials with the Cumberland County prosecutor's office accepted his request for pre-trial intervention, allowing dismissal of the charges if he met a series of court ordered requirements.
