= Frank Tepedino =

American baseball player (born 1947)

- First baseman
- Born: November 23, 1947 (age 78); Brooklyn, New York, U.S.
- Batted: Left Threw: Left

MLB debut
- May 12, 1967, for the New York Yankees

Last MLB appearance
- April 29, 1975, for the Atlanta Braves

MLB statistics
- Batting average: .241
- Home runs: 6
- Runs batted in: 58
- Stats at Baseball Reference

Teams
- New York Yankees (1967, 1969–1971); Milwaukee Brewers (1971); New York Yankees (1972); Atlanta Braves (1973–1975)

Frank Ronald Tepedino (born November 23, 1947) is an American former left-handed professional baseball player. He played in Major League Baseball for the New York Yankees (1967–1972), Milwaukee Brewers (1971) and Atlanta Braves (1973–1975) professional baseball teams in Major League Baseball during his career. Tepedino was inducted into the Suffolk Sports Hall of Fame in 2004.

== Career ==
Tepedino graduated from George W. Wingate High School in Brooklyn, New York, in 1965. He was drafted by the Baltimore Orioles on June 8, 1965, in the third round of the 1965 amateur draft. He was then drafted from the Orioles by the New York Yankees on November 28, 1966, in the 1966 first-year draft.

Tepedino made his major league debut on May 12, 1967, with the Yankees in a game against Orioles at Yankee Stadium, with 22,300 in attendance. He pinch hit for Whitey Ford in the bottom of the third inning of a blowout, and popped out to shortstop. The Yankees lost the game by a score of 14–0.

Tepedino was traded along with Bobby Mitchell from the Yankees to the Brewers for Danny Walton on June 7, 1971. On March 31, 1972, he was repurchased by the Yankees from the Brewers, and on June 7, 1973, traded again, with Wayne Nordhagen and players to be named later, to the Atlanta Braves for Pat Dobson. To complete the trade, the Yankees also sent Dave Cheadle on August 15, 1973, and Al Closter on September 5, 1973, to the Braves.

== Personal life ==
After retiring from baseball, Tepedino served as a firefighter for the New York Fire Patrol. Following the September 11 attacks, Tepedino drove to the World Trade Center site and participated in search and rescue operations. During an assembly at Rocky Point High School six years afterward, Tepedino said, "I lost 343 friends on September 11, 2001," referring to his fire department colleagues. "I didn't know them all personally, but they were all my friends." On October 11, 2001, one month after the attacks, Tepedino threw out the first pitch at the second game of the 2001 American League Division Series at Yankee Stadium.

Tepedino became addicted to alcohol at age 19. He has recovered and has given speeches to youngsters for the Long Island, New York based Winning for Winning, co-founded with former Yankee teammate Rusty Torres, which educates youth about the dangers of alcohol and drugs and promotes youth athletics.
