= Jim Rittwage =

American baseball player (1944–2026)

- Pitcher
- Born: October 23, 1944; Cleveland, Ohio, U.S.
- Died: August 26, 2026 (aged 81); Twinsburg, Ohio, U.S.
- Batted: Right Threw: Right

MLB debut
- September 7, 1970, for the Cleveland Indians

Last MLB appearance
- September 30, 1970, for the Cleveland Indians

MLB statistics
- Win–loss record: 1–1
- Earned run average: 4.15
- Strikeouts: 16
- Stats at Baseball Reference

Teams
- Cleveland Indians (1970)

James Michael Rittwage (October 23, 1944 – August 28, 2026) was an American Major League Baseball pitcher who played for one season. He pitched eight games for the Cleveland Indians during the 1970 season.

Rittwage died on August 28, 2026, at the age of 81.
