= Bob Heise =

American baseball player (born 1947)

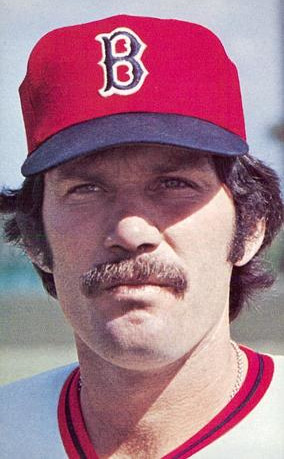
- Heise with the Boston Red Sox in 1976
- Infielder
- Born: May 12, 1947 (age 79); San Antonio, Texas, U.S.
- Batted: Right Threw: Right

MLB debut
- September 12, 1967, for the New York Mets

Last MLB appearance
- October 1, 1977, for the Kansas City Royals

MLB statistics
- Batting average: .247
- Home runs: 1
- Runs batted in: 86
- Stats at Baseball Reference

Teams
- New York Mets (1967–1969); San Francisco Giants (1970–1971); Milwaukee Brewers (1971–1973); St. Louis Cardinals (1974); California Angels (1974); Boston Red Sox (1975–1976); Kansas City Royals (1977)

Robert Lowell Heise (born May 12, 1947) is an American former professional baseball infielder, who played in Major League Baseball (MLB) for seven teams, from 1967 to 1977.

== Early years ==
Heise was a "military brat" born in San Antonio, Texas, but he spent most of his youth in California. As a junior at Vacaville High School in Vacaville, California, he was part of the Bulldogs team that won the 1964 Golden Empire League championship. Heise's American Legion Post 165 team, coached by his father, William, won the league championship in 1965. In February 1965, Heise signed as an amateur free agent with the New York Mets.

== Baseball career ==
=== New York Mets ===
Heise was a Western Carolinas League All-Star with the Greenville Mets in 1966, earning a September callup in 1967. In his major league debut, he collected his first hit, a single off Atlanta Braves pitcher Jay Ritchie, and was promptly caught stealing. Overall, Heise batted .323 in his first major league season.

He spent 1968 in the minors with the AAA Jacksonville Suns, splitting his time evenly between second base and shortstop in Jacksonville. He received a second September callup to the majors, mostly playing shortstop.

Heise was part of a proposed trade package along with Ed Kranepool and Amos Otis when the Mets attempted to acquire the Braves' Joe Torre who went to the St. Louis Cardinals for Orlando Cepeda instead. He spent 1969 playing shortstop for the triple A Tidewater Tides. He joined the Mets once again that September, going 3-for-10 in four games, but was not added to the postseason roster. Heise was sent along with Jim Gosger from the Mets to the San Francisco Giants for Ray Sadecki and Dave Marshall on December 12, 1969.

=== San Francisco Giants ===
Heise enjoyed his first full season in the majors in 1970. He spent most of the season backing up Hal Lanier at short until an injury to Ron Hunt made him the starting second baseman for the month of September. That year, Heise got a career-high 22 runs batted in (RBI) over 154 at bats. He also hit his first career triple and only career home run, on June 25 and 30, respectively.

=== Milwaukee Brewers ===
Heise had played in thirteen games, going hitless in 11 at bats when he was traded to the Milwaukee Brewers for Floyd Wicker on June 1, 1971. Upon his arrival in Milwaukee, Heise took over as the Brewers' starting shortstop.

Heise began seeing more playing time at third base in 1972. The move allowed Heise to attain career-highs in games (95) and ABs (271).

Heise’s playing time was significantly cut in 1973, due to many new acquisitions by the Brewers, including Don Money, Tim Johnson, and Pedro García.. He appeared in 49 games, batting .204. He was traded to the St. Louis Cardinals for Tom Murphy on December 8, 1973.

=== St. Louis Cardinals ===
Heise spent the majority of his time with the Cardinals organization with the AAA Tulsa Oilers, with his only trial being in all three games of a series against the Houston Astros in July. Heise was then dealt to the California Angels for a player to be named later.

=== California Angels ===
While with the California Angels, Heise saw action in 29 games backing up second and third base.

Heise was traded to the Boston Red Sox for Tommy Harper at the Winter Meetings on December 2, 1974.

=== Boston Red Sox ===
Heise batted .214 with 21 RBI in 1975. Though he was on the Red Sox post season roster, he did not appear in any post season games.

Though Heise was healthy throughout the 1976 season, he saw incredibly limited action. Heise appeared in only 32 games, and logged just 61 plate appearances.

On December 6, 1976, Heise was purchased by the Kansas City Royals.

=== Kansas City Royals ===
Heise saw limited playing time in Kansas City in 1977 (54 games played). He was released by the Royals in January 1978, and subsequently retired from active play, at the age of 30.

== Career statistics ==
Games	PA	AB	Runs	Hits	2B	3B	HR	RBI	SB	BB	SO	HBP	Avg.	Slg.	Fld%
499	1,232	1,144	104	283	43	3	1	86	3	47	77	6	.247	.293	.960
