= Bobby Mitchell (1970s outfielder) =

American baseball player (1943–2019)

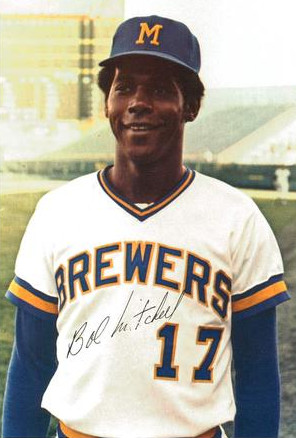
- Mitchell in 1973
- Outfielder
- Born: October 22, 1943; Norristown, Pennsylvania, U.S.
- Died: September 29, 2019 (aged 75); Sacramento, California, U.S.
- Batted: Right Threw: Right

MLB debut
- July 5, 1970, for the New York Yankees

Last MLB appearance
- September 28, 1975, for the Milwaukee Brewers

MLB statistics
- Batting average: .235
- Home runs: 21
- Runs batted in: 91

NPB statistics
- Batting average: .250
- Home runs: 113
- Runs batted in: 294
- Stats at Baseball Reference

Teams
- New York Yankees (1970); Milwaukee Brewers (1971, 1973–1975); Nippon-Ham Fighters (1976–1979)

Robert Vance Mitchell (October 22, 1943 – September 29, 2019) was an American professional baseball player. He attended Norristown High School in Norristown, Pennsylvania. He was an outfielder and designated hitter who appeared in 273 Major League Baseball games played between 1970 and 1975 for the New York Yankees and Milwaukee Brewers. He also played for the Nippon-Ham Fighters of Nippon Professional Baseball from 1976 through 1979.

== Biography ==
Mitchell threw and batted right-handed; he stood 6 feet 3 inches (1.91 m) tall and weighed 185 pounds (84 kg). He was originally signed by the Boston Red Sox in 1965 and selected by the Yankees in the 1968 Rule 5 Draft. He was traded along with Frank Tepedino from the Yankees to the Brewers for Danny Walton on June 7, 1971. He had 143 career MLB hits in 609 at bats, with 29 doubles, six triples and 14 stolen bases. He died in Sacramento, California on September 29, 2019.
