= Ray Durham =

American baseball player (born 1971)

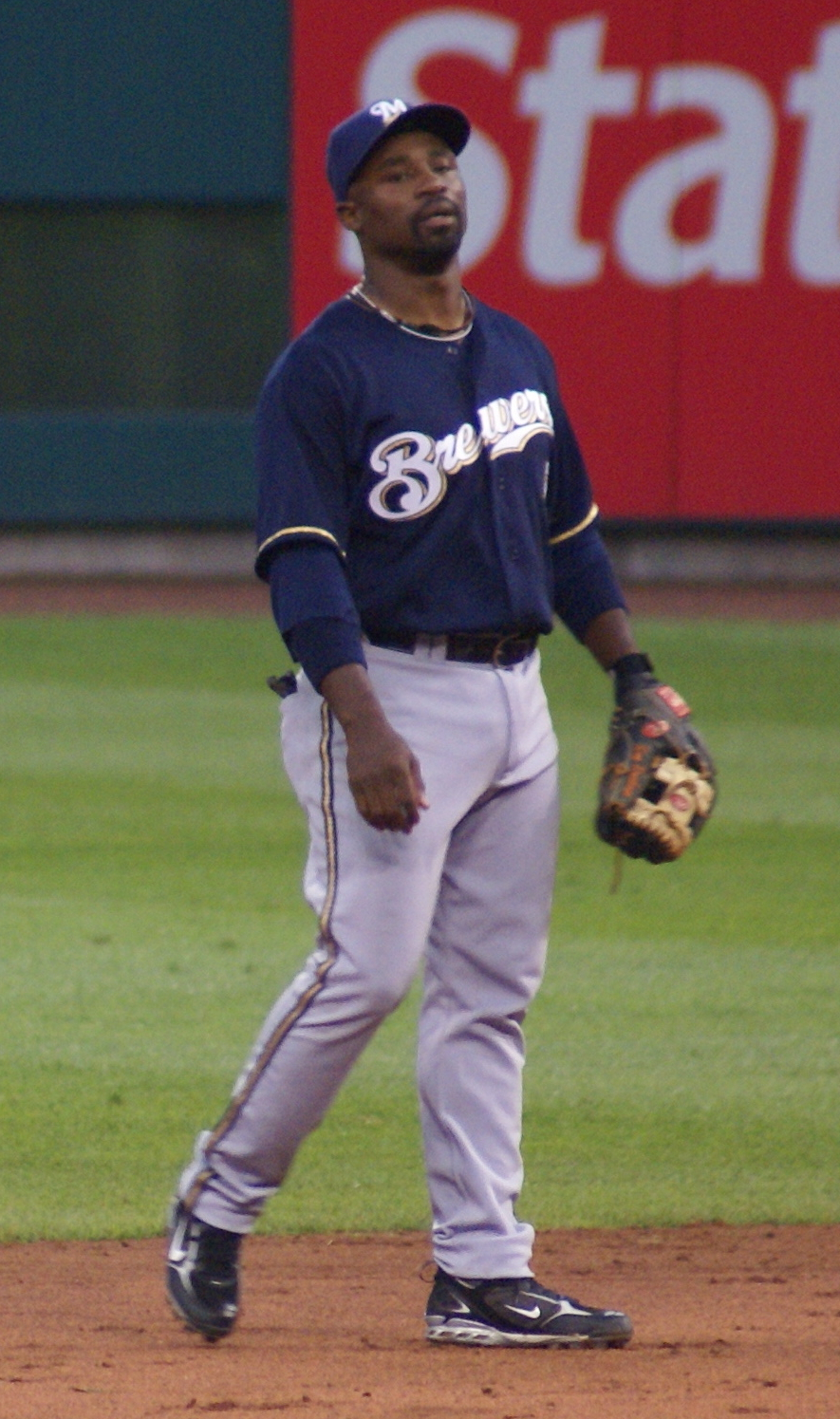
- Durham with the Milwaukee Brewers in 2008
- Second baseman
- Born: November 30, 1971 (age 54); Charlotte, North Carolina, U.S.
- Batted: Switch Threw: Right

MLB debut
- April 26, 1995, for the Chicago White Sox

Last MLB appearance
- September 28, 2008, for the Milwaukee Brewers

MLB statistics
- Batting average: .277
- Hits: 2,054
- Home runs: 192
- Runs batted in: 875
- Stats at Baseball Reference

Teams
- Chicago White Sox (1995–2002); Oakland Athletics (2002); San Francisco Giants (2003–2008); Milwaukee Brewers (2008)

Career highlights and awards
- 2× All-Star (1998, 2000)

Ray Durham (born November 30, 1971) is an American former Major League Baseball second baseman. He is a 14-year major league veteran owning a .277 lifetime batting average with 1,249 runs scored, 2,054 hits, 440 doubles, 79 triples, 192 home runs, 875 run batted in (RBIs) and 273 stolen bases in 1,975 career games.

== Early life ==
Durham attended Harry P. Harding High School in Charlotte, North Carolina, where he played baseball and football. While on the football team, he was teammates with future professional wrestler R-Truth. Durham was on the state select baseball team and was an honorable mention All-American in football as a defensive back. In 1988, he helped the Harding baseball team win the NCHSAA 4A state title. In 1990, he was drafted in 5th round by the Chicago White Sox. Durham did not attend college, as he began playing minor league baseball with the Gulf Coast White Sox.

== Major League career ==
=== Chicago White Sox (1995–2002) ===
Durham was a member of the Chicago White Sox from 1995 to 2002. Durham was a leadoff hitter during these years of his career. Durham established himself as one of baseball's better leadoff hitters with an above-league average on-base percentages. He also averaged well over 20 stolen bases and 10 home runs per season. His performance from 2000 to 2002 was exceptional. By posting at least 15 home runs with 100 runs, 20 steals, a .450 slugging percentage, and 65 RBIs in three consecutive seasons, Durham became just the 10th player in baseball history to accomplish such a feat. Durham is in great company, including Hall of Famers Hank Aaron, Willie Mays, and Joe Morgan, as well as Barry Bonds and Alex Rodriguez. Durham left Chicago as the club's all-time leader in leadoff home runs (20), while ranking fifth in steals (219), seventh in doubles (249) and extra base hits (408), and eighth in runs (784).

=== Oakland Athletics (2002) ===
Durham was traded to the Oakland Athletics before the 2002 baseball trading deadline for right-handed pitcher Jon Adkins. Durham's hitting helped push he A's into the 2002 playoffs. The Durham deal was a prototypical "rent a player" trade that can occur at the trading deadline. The A's, who constantly rank among the bottom teams in baseball in player salaries, made a trade for the short-term playoff push. Durham was a part of the A's 20 consecutive game winning streak in 2002. With the A's limited finances, it was well known in baseball circles that Durham would most likely re-sign elsewhere.

=== San Francisco Giants (2003–2008) ===
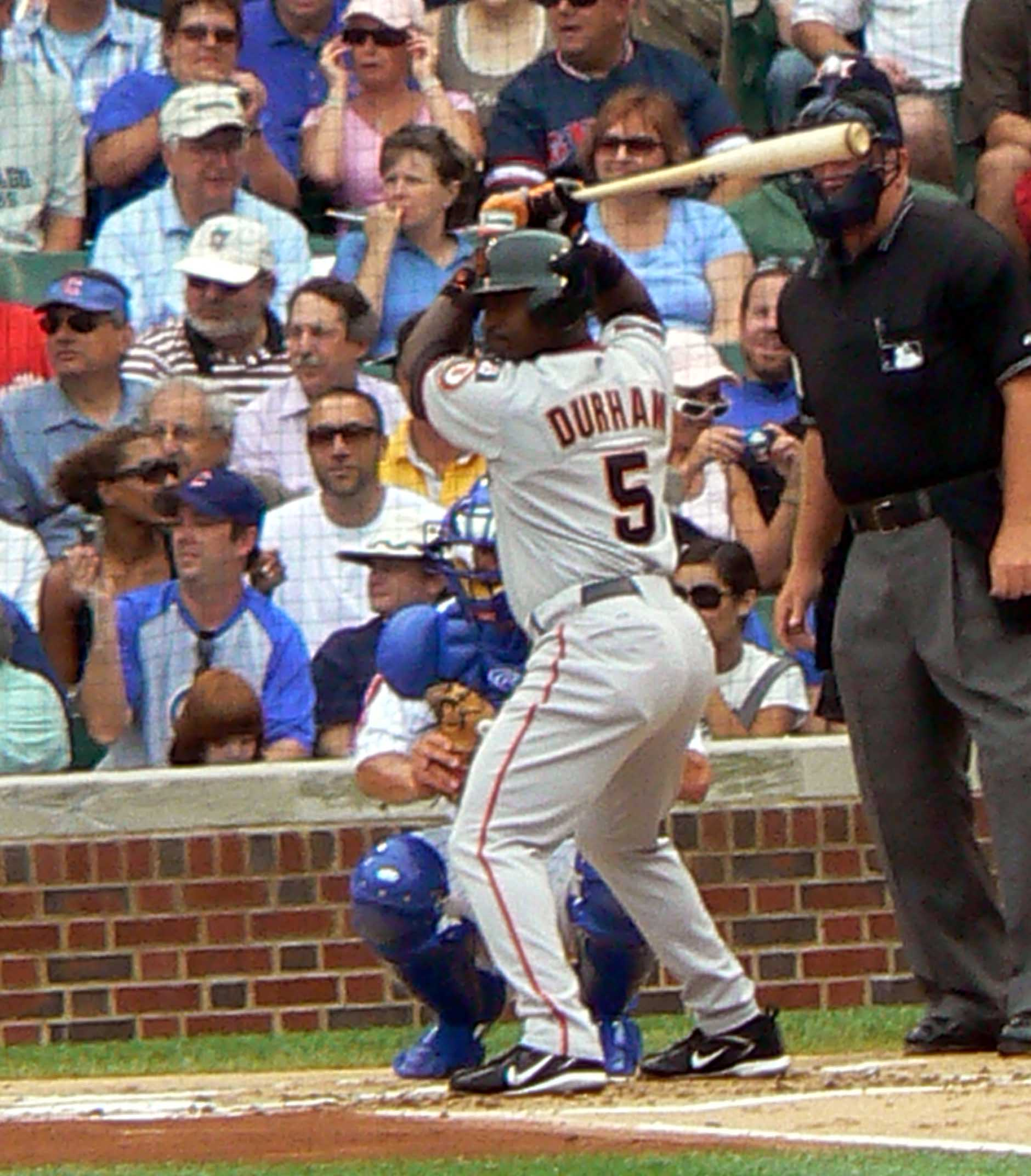
Durham in 2007

After the 2002 season, Durham signed a three-year contract worth $20.1 million with the San Francisco Giants with a $7 million player option for a fourth year that was later exercised. The health Durham displayed during the earlier years of his career vanished. Between 1996 and 2002, Durham appeared in at least 150 games each season, but in 2003 he only appeared in 110 games and in 2004 he appeared in 120. Recurring hamstring injuries and other injuries caused Durham to spend time on the disabled list. The injuries also hampered Durham's success when he was on the field. Durham's running game and stolen bases dropped as Durham tried to protect his hamstrings from reinjury. Despite these injuries, Durham did post solid offensive numbers during his time in the line up.

Because of Durham's injuries that limited his speed and the recurring injuries to Giants outfielder Moisés Alou, Durham was given the opportunity to bat fifth in the batting order more often. Durham was batted fifth regularly in 2006. In the 2005–2006 off-season, Durham adopted a new work out and strength conditioning routine. The result was a healthy Durham and perhaps his best offensive year in 2006 when in 137 games he batted .293 with career highs in slugging percentage (.538), home runs (26), RBIs (93).

Durham re-signed with the Giants for a two-year contract worth $14.5 million on December 2, 2006. Giants general manager Brian Sabean lauded Durham for making an impressive transition from a lead-off hitter to a middle of the order run producer.

After re-signing with the Giants, Durham struggled in 2007. Durham called the season "embarrassing" and the "worst" of his career. Durham admitted that his defense had suffered because he was thinking about his hitting while on defense. Durham claimed he had trouble adjusting to the new strategy to pitch against him, which included throwing cutters inside and throwing curveballs on the outside corner. Some Giants fans and radio personalities criticized Durham's performance in 2006 as being motivated by money because 2006 was Durham's contract year. Durham denied these claims and claimed that almost every year is a contract year.

On August 21, 2007, against Sergio Mitre of the Florida Marlins, Durham fouled a pitch at the plate that bounced up and hit his groin. He would go on to single on the next pitch. "I was swinging at the first thing so I could sit down", Durham said. "Then, I end up with a knock and I had to run from first to third. It did not feel good".

On June 12, 2008, Durham got his 2000th hit off Colorado Rockies pitcher Greg Reynolds.

=== Milwaukee Brewers (2008) ===
On July 20, 2008, Durham, was traded to the Milwaukee Brewers for minor league pitcher Steve Hammond and minor league outfielder Darren Ford.

Durham filed for free agency on November 1, 2008. He retired after rejecting a minor league deal from the Washington Nationals.

== Personal life ==
Durham and his wife Regina have three children.

== See also ==
- List of Major League Baseball career doubles leaders
- List of Major League Baseball career runs scored leaders
- List of Major League Baseball career hits leaders
- List of Major League Baseball career stolen bases leaders
