= Bob Kaiser =

American baseball player (born 1950)

- Pitcher
- Born: April 29, 1950 (age 76); Cincinnati, Ohio, U.S.
- Batted: Switch Threw: Left

MLB debut
- September 3, 1971, for the Cleveland Indians

Last MLB appearance
- September 18, 1971, for the Cleveland Indians

MLB statistics
- Win–loss record: 0–0
- Earned run average: 4.50
- Innings: 6
- Stats at Baseball Reference

Teams
- Cleveland Indians (1971)

Robert Thomas Kaiser (born April 29, 1950) is an American former Major League Baseball pitcher, a left-handed reliever who appeared in five games for the Cleveland Indians during the 1971 season. Kaiser stood 5 feet 10 inches (1.78 m) tall and weighed 175 pounds (79 kg).

Selected in the second round in the 1968 Major League Baseball draft, Kaiser was recalled by Cleveland after spending the 1971 season at three levels of minor league baseball, Class A through Triple-A. In his MLB debut, he surrendered a home run to the first batter he faced, Duane Josephson of the Boston Red Sox. But he finished the inning strongly by striking out a future Hall of Famer, Carl Yastrzemski.

All told, he allowed eight hits and three earned runs in six MLB innings pitched, with three bases on balls and four strikeouts. He did not record a save.
