= Alan Closter =

American baseball player (1943–2026)

- Pitcher
- Born: June 15, 1943; Creighton, Nebraska, U.S.
- Died: June 12, 2026 (aged 82); Morattico, Virginia, U.S.
- Batted: Left Threw: Left

MLB debut
- April 19, 1966, for the Washington Senators

Last MLB appearance
- September 17, 1973, for the Atlanta Braves

MLB statistics
- Win–loss record: 2–2
- Strikeouts: 26
- Earned run average: 6.62
- Stats at Baseball Reference

Teams
- Washington Senators (1966); New York Yankees (1971–1972); Atlanta Braves (1973)

Alan Edward Closter (June 15, 1943 – June 12, 2026) was an American professional baseball pitcher. He played on the United States national team during the 1964 Summer Olympics. He pitched parts of four seasons in Major League Baseball between 1966 and 1973, pitching in a total of 21 games.

== Career ==
Closter played college baseball at Iowa State University. He represented the United States in baseball at the 1964 Summer Olympics as a demonstration sport, one of seven pitchers on the team. He was signed by the New York Yankees as an amateur free agent before the start of the 1965 season.

=== Minor leagues ===
In 1965, Closter's first year in the minor leagues, he split his time between two teams, the Rookie league Johnson City Yankees of the Appalachian League and the Single-A Greensboro Yankees of the Carolina League. In the winter, Closter also spent time with the Yankees affiliate im the Florida Instructional League.

On November 29, 1965, the Cleveland Indians selected Closter in the Rule 5 Draft. A few months later, on April 6, 1966, before ever playing a game in the Indians organization, the Washington Senators purchased Closter's contract. He played only one game in the Senators organization, pitching 1/3 of an inning against the Baltimore Orioles in his MLB debut, before being purchased again by the Yankees on May 3, 1966. After returning to the New York Yankees organization, Closter finished the season with the Greensboro Yankees.

Closter spent the entirety of the 1967 season with the Double-A Binghamton Triplets of the Eastern League. Closter pitched in only 14 games that year but pitched well, going 4–0 with a 1.74 ERA and 45 strikeouts.

In 1968, Closter began the season with the Single-A Fort Lauderdale Yankees of the Florida State League. Playing only five games there, he was quickly promoted to the Triple-A Syracuse Chiefs of the International League. For the rest of his career with the Yankees, Closter would bounce between Syracuse and the Major Leagues. Between 1968 and 1973, Closter played in 249 games for Syracuse, with a 69–58 record.

=== Major leagues ===
After making his Major League debut with the Senators in 1966, Closter did not pitch again in MLB until 1971, when he made occasional relief appearances for the Yankees. Closter made one start in 1971 against the Detroit Tigers on September 4. He pitched 5 innings and allowed 5 hits and 5 earned runs, two of which were home runs.

Closter was traded to the Atlanta Braves on September 5, 1973, as the player to be named later as part of a trade that sent Wayne Nordhagen and Frank Tepedino to Atlanta for pitcher Pat Dobson.

In his remaining two seasons in the MLB, Closter only made 6 appearances between the Yankees and Braves, pitching 6 2/3 innings in relief.

== Post-retirement ==
After retiring, Closter lived in Richmond, Virginia. He worked for Philip Morris International for 30 years, focused on product development in Latin America. In 2006, Closter was elected to the Syracuse Baseball Wall of Fame.

Closter died in Morattico, Virginia on June 12, 2026, at the age of 82.
