= Danny Walton =

American baseball player (1947–2017)

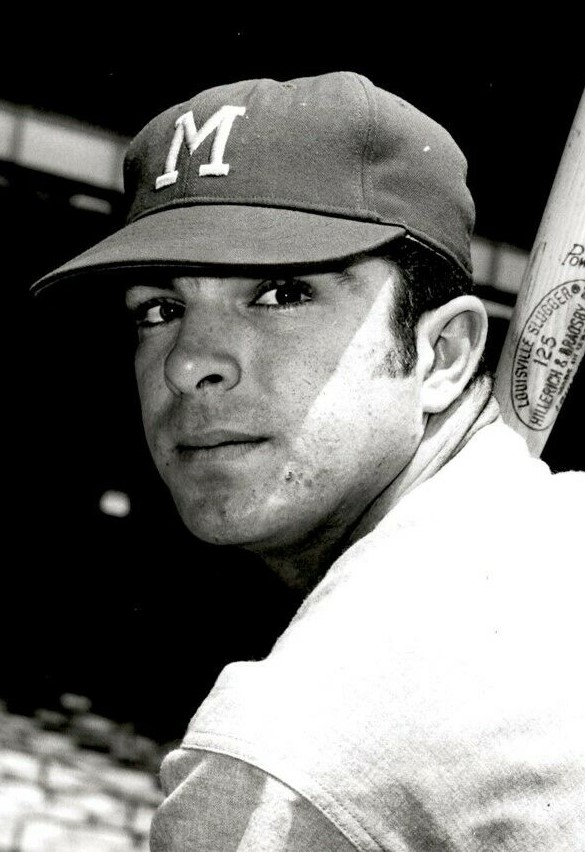
- Outfielder
- Born: July 14, 1947; Los Angeles, California, U.S.
- Died: August 9, 2017 (aged 70); Morgan, Utah, U.S.
- Batted: Right Threw: Right

MLB debut
- April 20, 1968, for the Houston Astros

Last MLB appearance
- June 6, 1980, for the Texas Rangers

MLB statistics
- Batting average: .223
- Home runs: 28
- Runs batted in: 107
- Stats at Baseball Reference

Teams
- Houston Astros (1968); Seattle Pilots / Milwaukee Brewers (1969–1971); New York Yankees (1971); Minnesota Twins (1973, 1975); Los Angeles Dodgers (1976); Houston Astros (1977); Yokohama Taiyo Whales (1978); Texas Rangers (1980)

Daniel James Walton (July 14, 1947 – August 9, 2017) was an American Major League Baseball outfielder. Walton attended Bishop Amat Memorial High School, and was selected in the 10th round (192nd overall) of the 1965 MLB draft by the Houston Astros. He played for the Houston Astros (1968 and 1977), Seattle Pilots / Milwaukee Brewers (1969–71), New York Yankees (1971), Minnesota Twins (1973 and 1975), Los Angeles Dodgers (1976), Yokohama Taiyo Whales (1978), and Texas Rangers (1980). During a nine-year major league baseball career, he hit .223, with 28 home runs, and 107 runs batted in (RBI) in 297 career games.

Walton, along with Sandy Valdespino, was traded from the Houston Astros to the Seattle Pilots for Tommy Davis on August 31, 1969. Popular with the Brewers fans who sat in the left field bleachers at Milwaukee County Stadium, Walton was dealt to the Yankees for Bobby Mitchell and Frank Tepedino on June 7, 1971. Walton was sent by the Yankees to the Minnesota Twins for Rick Dempsey on October 31, 1972.

The Sporting News awarded Walton their Minor League Player of the Year Award in 1969 for his season with the Oklahoma City 89ers. He batted .332 with 25 home runs and 119 RBI that season.

Walton's friend and minor-league teammate while in the Dodgers organization, longtime Atlanta Braves broadcaster Joe Simpson, called Walton "arguably the strongest man I ever played with." One season while Walton was playing winter ball in Puerto Rico, he answered an advertisement seeking a sparring partner for boxer Joe King Roman. Walton had small amount of previous experience as an amateur boxer and without much effort, in his words, "Beat the hell out of [Roman]." Walton was immediately fired as Roman's sparring partner.

Walton died August 9, 2017, in Morgan, Utah, aged 70. He worked as a welder after his retirement from professional baseball.
