= Ray Lamb =

American baseball player (born 1944)

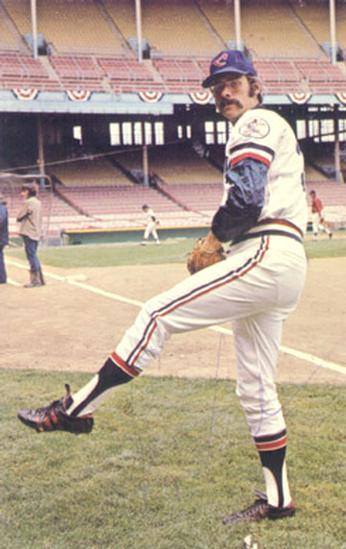
- Pitcher
- Born: December 28, 1944; Glendale, California, U.S.
- Died: December 25, 2025 (aged 80); San Clemente, California, U.S.
- Batted: Right Threw: Right

MLB debut
- August 1, 1969, for the Los Angeles Dodgers

Last MLB appearance
- September 28, 1973, for the Cleveland Indians

MLB statistics
- Win–loss record: 20–23
- Earned run average: 3.54
- Strikeouts: 258
- Stats at Baseball Reference

Teams
- Los Angeles Dodgers (1969–1970); Cleveland Indians (1971–1973)

Raymond Richard Lamb (December 28, 1944 – December 25, 2025) was an American former pitcher in Major League Baseball for two teams, and a highly regarded commercial sculptor of fantasy miniature figurines.

== Major league pitcher ==
During college, Ray Lamb was a pitcher for the University of Southern California Trojans, where he wore the number 42.

A 40th round pick of the Los Angeles Dodgers in 1966, Lamb played for three seasons in the minor leagues before he was called up to the major leagues. He joined the Dodgers on August 1, 1969, and was given jersey number 42, the number he had worn in college, but also the number that Jackie Robinson had worn as a Brooklyn Dodger. No other Dodger in either Brooklyn or Los Angeles had worn that number since Robinson had retired in 1957. Lamb wore the jersey for the rest of the season, and pitched very well: in 15 innings of work, he struck out 11, with a 1.80 ERA, earning one loss and one save.

The jersey with number 42 was taken from him at the end of the season — the Dodgers were planning to retire Jackie Robinson's number — and at the start of the 1970 season, he was given number 34. Wearing his new number, he never quite regained the magic of his first two months, finishing the 1970 season with a 6-1 record and a 3.79 ERA.

At the end of the 1970 season, Lamb was traded to the Cleveland Indians, and pitched there from 1971-1973, earning a 14-21 record, before a shoulder injury ended his career.

In 1980, Fernando Valenzuela started pitching for the LA Dodgers, and was given Lamb's second number, 34. At the end of Valenzuela's career, the Dodgers retired his number, making Lamb not only the last Dodger to wear Jackie Robinson's number 42, but also the only Dodger player to have worn two numbers that were subsequently retired.

== Commercial sculptor ==
After his baseball career ended, Lamb became a sculptor of miniature lead military figures.

By 1980, Lamb was working for Perth Pewter, a subsidiary of Superior Models, sculpting a highly regarded line of 25 mm fantasy miniatures called Wizards and Lizards for the burgeoning fantasy role-playing game market. Reviewers gave his works high praise, using phrases like "excellent detail", "amazingly lifelike", "high quality", "expertly inscribed", "a great degree of deeply etched detail", "excellent pieces", and "truly gorgeous". One writer called Lamb "one of the world's greatest miniature sculptors."

Lamb died on December 25, 2025.
