= Chuck Machemehl =

American baseball player (born 1946)

- Pitcher
- Born: April 20, 1946 (age 80); Brenham, Texas, U.S.
- Batted: Right Threw: Right

MLB debut
- April 6, 1971, for the Cleveland Indians

Last MLB appearance
- May 7, 1971, for the Cleveland Indians

MLB statistics
- Win–loss record: 0–2
- Earned run average: 6.38
- Strikeouts: 9
- Stats at Baseball Reference

Teams
- Cleveland Indians (1971)

Charles Walter Machemehl (born April 20, 1946) is an American former Major League Baseball pitcher. Currently a rancher and businessman in Central Texas, the graduate of Texas Christian University was drafted by the Cleveland Indians in 1968, and played for them during the 1971 season. A right-hander, Machemehl stood 6 feet 4 inches (1.93 m) tall and weighed 200 pounds (91 kg) as an active player.

In 14 Major League games, all in relief, Machemehl lost his only two decisions, but earned three saves with seven games finished. In 18 1/3 innings pitched, he allowed 16 hits and 15 bases on balls, with only nine strikeouts.
