= Jerry Bell (pitcher) =

American baseball player (born 1947)

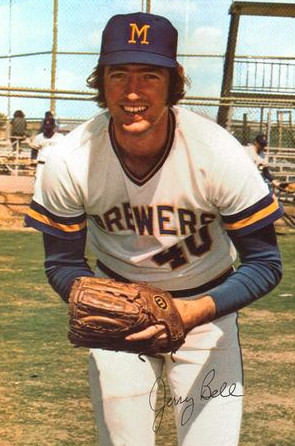
- Bell in 1973
- Pitcher
- Born: October 6, 1947 (age 77); Madison, Tennessee, U.S.
- Batted: Both Threw: Right

MLB debut
- September 6, 1971, for the Milwaukee Brewers

Last MLB appearance
- May 15, 1974, for the Milwaukee Brewers

MLB statistics
- Win–loss record: 17–11
- Earned run average: 3.28
- Strikeouts: 89
- Stats at Baseball Reference

Teams
- Milwaukee Brewers (1971–1974)

Jerry Houston Bell (born October 6, 1947) is a former Major League Baseball pitcher. Bell played for the Milwaukee Brewers for four seasons. He batted right and left and threw right-handed. In 1972 he led the pitching staff in ERA with 1.66.

Bell attended Jesup High School and then Rhodes College where he was drafted by the Seattle Pilots (now known as the Milwaukee Brewers) in the 2nd round of the 1969 draft.
