= Bob Sheldon =

American baseball player (born 1950)

- Second baseman
- Born: November 27, 1950 (age 75); Montebello, California, U.S.
- Batted: Left Threw: Right

MLB debut
- April 10, 1974, for the Milwaukee Brewers

Last MLB appearance
- July 17, 1977, for the Milwaukee Brewers

MLB statistics
- Batting average: .256
- Home runs: 0
- Runs batted in: 17
- Stats at Baseball Reference

Teams
- Milwaukee Brewers (1974–1975, 1977)

Bob Mitchell Sheldon (born November 27, 1950) is an American former Major League Baseball second baseman who played parts of three seasons, 1974, 1975 and 1977, for the Milwaukee Brewers. He batted left-handed, threw right-handed, and was listed as 6 feet (1.8 m) tall and 170 pounds (77 kg).

Sheldon was born in Montebello, California, and graduated from Montebello High School. The Brewers drafted him out of Loyola Marymount University in the 22nd round of the 1972 amateur draft. He broke into the majors in April 1974, his third pro season.

His most sustained tenure in MLB came in 1975, when Sheldon started in 45 games for the Brewers at either second base or designated hitter, and had a batting average of .287. Overall, he collected 67 hits in his 94 games in the majors, including eight doubles and five triples, along with 17 runs batted in.

His pro career concluded after the 1977 season.
