= Rob Ellis (baseball) =

American baseball player (born 1950)

- Outfielder
- Born: July 3, 1950 (age 75); Grand Rapids, Michigan
- Batted: Right Threw: Right

MLB debut
- June 18, 1971, for the Milwaukee Brewers

Last MLB appearance
- May 14, 1975, for the Milwaukee Brewers

MLB statistics
- Batting average: .229
- Home runs: 0
- Runs batted in: 10
- Stats at Baseball Reference

Teams
- Milwaukee Brewers (1971, 1974–1975)

Robert Walter Ellis (born July 3, 1950) is an American professional baseball player, coach, and manager. He played in Major League Baseball (MLB) for the Milwaukee Brewers. Since his retirement as a player, Ellis has served as a coach and manager in college baseball and minor league baseball. He has also written screenplays and books.

After a successful collegiate career for the Michigan State Spartans, the Brewers drafted Ellis in 1971 and brought him straight to the major leagues. He played for the Brewers during the 1971, 1974, and 1975 seasons. Over the course of his MLB playing career, Ellis played in a total of just 64 games spread out over three seasons, about half as an outfielder, with the rest as a third baseman and designated hitter. He played in the minor leagues until 1980.

== Playing career ==
Ellis attended Ottawa Hills High School in Grand Rapids, Michigan, where he starred in baseball and American football. Drafted by the San Francisco Giants in 1968, he did not sign, as he hoped for a team that would promote him to the major leagues quickly. Ellis then attended Michigan State University, where he played college baseball for the Michigan State Spartans baseball team. Ellis batted .380 as a sophomore and .431 as a junior. He set Spartans single-season records with 14 home runs, 60 hits, 13 doubles, and 123 total bases. Ellis was voted college player of the year in 1971 by The Sporting News. Ellis was named to the All-American squad that same year.

The Washington Senators were expected to choose Ellis with the first overall selection in the June 1971 secondary draft. Instead, the Senators chose pitcher Pete Broberg. After the Chicago Cubs selected Burt Hooton with the second pick, the Milwaukee Brewers drafted Ellis with the third selection. The Brewers immediately promoted him to the majors, bypassing minor league baseball. Ellis was the fourth player to go straight to the Major Leagues after being drafted without spending a day in the minors. The Brewers sold Mike Hegan to the Oakland Athletics, naming Ellis their starting first baseman. The Brewers expected success from Ellis, comparing him to Chris Chambliss.

This turned out to be premature, as Ellis batted just .198 in 36 games that year and was sent to the minors. The Brewers demoted Ellis to the Evansville Triplets of the Class AAA American Association, where he batted .300. In 1972, Ellis played for the San Antonio Brewers of the Class AA Texas League and Evansville. He spent all of the 1973 season with Evansville.

Ellis began the 1974 season with the Brewers. Despite hitting .298 in 47 at-bats, the second best batting average on the team, the Brewers demoted Ellis to the Sacramento Solons of the Class AAA Pacific Coast League (PCL) in June, when they acquired Deron Johnson from the Oakland Athletics. Ellis batted .296 for the Solons in 1974. In 1975, Ellis suffered an arm injury in spring training, and the Brewers returned him to Sacramento. Ellis spent all of the 1975 season with the Solons, with the exception of six games played with Milwaukee. Ellis batted .250 with the Solons in 1975. After the 1975 season, Ellis took out an advertisement in The Sacramento Union apologizing to the fans of Sacramento for his low batting average.

Ellis remained with Brewers' affiliates, playing for the Spokane Indians of the PCL in 1976 and 1977. A free agent after the 1977 season, Ellis signed with the Cleveland Indians organization for the 1978 season, and played for the Portland Beavers in 1978 and Tacoma Tugs in 1979, both in the PCL. He was sold to the Pittsburgh Pirates during the 1979 season, who assigned him to Portland for the remainder of the 1979 season, and for 1980.

== Coaching career ==
After he retired, Ellis became a coach in minor league baseball for the Chicago Cubs organization in 1983. He then served as an assistant coach at Michigan State from 1985 through 1990. He also coached the Anchorage Glacier Pilots, a collegiate summer baseball team in the Alaska Baseball League.

In 1991, Ellis managed the Everett Giants of the Northwest League from August 11 until the end of the season, replacing Mike Bubalo. The team went 26-27 under Ellis, but he was not retained as manager for the 1992 season. Ellis served as a roving hitting instructor for the Baltimore Orioles organization from 1995 through 1997. He was named hitting instructor for the New Britain Rock Cats of the Class AA Eastern League in 1998, and also served in the role in 1999.

Ellis was named head coach of the Longview High School (TX) baseball team on June 11, 2025.

== Personal ==
Ellis has a master's degree in psychology.

Ellis wrote an autobiographical book, titled The Outfielder, which was not published. He also wrote a screenplay, titled The Tundra Ghost, which was inspired by his time as an extra on The Slugger's Wife. With Mike Schmidt, Ellis co-wrote "The Mike Schmidt Study, Hitting Theory, Skills and Technique".

== See also ==
- List of baseball players who went directly to Major League Baseball
