= Johnny Lipon =

American baseball player and manager (1922–1998)

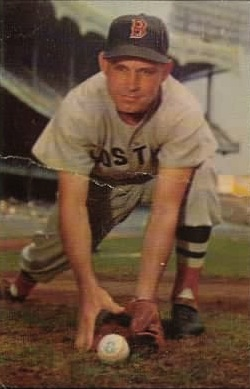
- Lipon, c. 1953
- Shortstop / Manager
- Born: November 10, 1922; Martins Ferry, Ohio, U.S.
- Died: August 17, 1998 (aged 75); Houston, Texas, U.S.
- Batted: Right Threw: Right

MLB debut
- August 16, 1942, for the Detroit Tigers

Last MLB appearance
- April 25, 1954, for the Cincinnati Redlegs

MLB statistics
- Batting average: .259
- Home runs: 10
- Runs batted in: 266
- Managerial record: 18–41
- Winning %: .305
- Stats at Baseball Reference

Teams
- As player: Detroit Tigers (1942, 1946, 1948–1952); Boston Red Sox (1952–1953); St. Louis Browns (1953); Cincinnati Redlegs (1954); As manager: Cleveland Indians (1971)

John Joseph Lipon (November 10, 1922 – August 17, 1998) was an American Major League Baseball shortstop for the Detroit Tigers, Boston Red Sox, St. Louis Browns and Cincinnati Redlegs over the course of nine seasons (1942; 1946; 1948–1954). The native of Martins Ferry, Ohio, threw and batted right-handed, stood 6 feet (1.8 m) tall and weighed 175 pounds (79 kg). He served in the United States Navy during World War II in the Pacific Theater of Operations, as an aviation machinist's mate, third class.

== Playing career ==
Like many at his position, Lipon was never known for his power and was not an exceptional fielder, either. One of the most memorable moments of his playing career was in 1951, when Bob Feller of the Indians threw his third career no-hitter, but lost the shutout when Lipon reached on an error, stole second base, advanced to third on an errant pickoff throw, and scored on a sacrifice fly.

In 1952, Lipon was part of a trade to the Red Sox that included longtime star Johnny Pesky going to the Tigers. His playing time diminished, and in the 1953 season, he was sold to the St. Louis Browns. In 1954, the Browns moved east to Baltimore, but Lipon was quickly traded to the Chicago White Sox. Before playing a game for the White Sox, however, he was traded to the Cincinnati Reds. He had one National League at-bat before he was farmed to the new Havana Sugar Kings of the International League. He played in the high minors several years, evolving into a player/coach.

== As manager and coach ==
In 1959, Lipon became a minor league manager, beginning at the Class D level with the Selma Cloverleafs of the Alabama–Florida League in the Cleveland Indians' organization. Lipon spent 30 of the next 34 years as a manager in the Cleveland, Detroit and Pittsburgh Pirates farm systems, winning 2,185 games and losing 1,987 (.524). He spent part of the 1961 season as manager of the Triple-A Toronto Maple Leafs of the International League, and his success as skipper of the Portland Beavers of the Pacific Coast League in the mid-1960s earned him a promotion to the Indians' coaching staff, where he served from 1968 to 1971.

Lipon's only chance at a Major League managing job came during the 1971 season, when Cleveland fired Alvin Dark on July 29 with 59 games left and Lipon was named to finish the season as interim pilot. But the Indians went only 18–41 (.305) under him, good for last place in the American League East, 43 games behind the Baltimore Orioles.

Lipon returned to managing in the minors the next season with the Triple-A Toledo Mud Hens, and continued for the next two decades. He retired from managing after the 1992 season. His last club, the Lakeland Tigers of the Florida State League, won its division's second-half championship. In 1992 he was presented with the King of Baseball award given by Minor League Baseball at the yearly Baseball Winter Meetings.

Tommy John played under Lipon in Charleston and Portland. "Lipon was an excellent manager," John recalled. "He treated players like adults. When we'd go to Hawaii, he'd tell us to have fun, enjoy the sights, the ocean, the beaches. He encouraged us to be ourselves. He was an excellent handler of men, and I never understood why he didn't get the chance to manage in the big leagues."

Lipon died in Houston, Texas, at the age of 75.

=== Managerial record ===
Team	Year	Regular season					Postseason			
Team	Year	Games	Won	Lost	Win %	Finish	Won	Lost	Win %	Result
CLE	1971	59	18	41	.305	6th in AL East	–	–	–	–
Total		59	18	41	.305		0	0	–	
