= Roger Hambright =

American baseball player (1949–2023)

- Pitcher
- Born: March 26, 1949; Sunnyside, Washington, U.S.
- Died: April 15, 2023 (aged 74); Vancouver, Washington, U.S.
- Batted: Right Threw: Right

MLB debut
- July 19, 1971, for the New York Yankees

Last MLB appearance
- September 25, 1971, for the New York Yankees

MLB statistics
- Win–loss record: 3–1
- Earned run average: 4.39
- Strikeouts: 14
- Stats at Baseball Reference

Teams
- New York Yankees (1971)

Roger Dee Hambright (March 26, 1949 – April 15, 2023) was an American Major League Baseball pitcher. Hambright played for the New York Yankees in 1971. In 18 career games, he had a 3–1 record with a 4.39 ERA. He batted and threw right-handed.

Hambright was drafted by the Yankees in the 67th round of the 1967 amateur draft.

Hambright died in Vancouver, Washington on April 15, 2023, at the age of 74.
