= Floyd Wicker =

American baseball player (born 1943)

- Outfielder
- Born: September 12, 1943 (age 81); Burlington, North Carolina, U.S.
- Batted: Left Threw: Right

MLB debut
- June 23, 1968, for the St. Louis Cardinals

Last MLB appearance
- July 7, 1971, for the San Francisco Giants

MLB statistics
- Batting average: .159
- Hits: 18
- Home runs: 1
- Runs batted in: 6
- Stats at Baseball Reference

Teams
- St. Louis Cardinals (1968); Montreal Expos (1969); Milwaukee Brewers (1970–1971); San Francisco Giants (1971)

Floyd Euliss Wicker (born September 12, 1943) is an American former professional baseball outfielder. Born in Burlington, North Carolina, Wicker attended Walter M. Williams High School then East Carolina University; he batted left-handed, threw right-handed, stood 6 feet 2 inches (1.88 m) and weighed 175 pounds (79 kg).

== Career ==
He signed with the St. Louis Cardinals at age 17 and his professional career lasted from 1961–1971, with two seasons missed due to military service. He appeared in Major League Baseball between 1968 and 1971 for the Cardinals, Montreal Expos, Milwaukee Brewers and San Francisco Giants. He was traded from the Brewers to the Giants for Bob Heise on June 1, 1971.

His lifetime major league batting average was .159, with 18 hits in 113 at bats. In his longest MLB tenure, the Expos' maiden 1969 campaign, Wicker appeared in 41 games, almost exclusively as a pinch hitter, getting four hits in 39 at bats, for a batting average of .103. His only MLB home run occurred as during his tenure with the Brewers: on September 26, 1970, he hit a two-run shot off Chicago White Sox starting pitcher Floyd Weaver, helping Milwaukee defeat Chicago, 9–5.
