= Rick Austin (baseball) =

American baseball player (born 1946)

- Pitcher
- Born: October 27, 1946 (age 79); Seattle, Washington, U.S.
- Batted: Right Threw: Left

MLB debut
- June 21, 1970, for the Cleveland Indians

Last MLB appearance
- June 27, 1976, for the Milwaukee Brewers

MLB statistics
- Win–loss record: 4–8
- Earned run average: 4.63
- Strikeouts: 106
- Stats at Baseball Reference

Teams
- Cleveland Indians (1970–1971); Hankyu Braves (1974); Milwaukee Brewers (1975–1976)

Rick Gerald Austin (born October 27, 1946) is an American former Major League Baseball (MLB) pitcher. He pitched parts of four seasons between 1970 and 1976.

Austin attended Washington State University, where he played college baseball for the Cougars in 1967 and 1968. In a game against Gonzaga University on March 22, 1968, he pitched a perfect game. He was drafted by the Cleveland Indians in the first round of the secondary phase of the 1968 Major League Baseball draft, and began his professional career with the AA Waterbury Indians. In 1968, Austin had a 1–8 win-loss record and a 2.73 earned run average (ERA), and in 1969 he split the season between Waterbury, the Indians' rookie team, and the Portland Beavers. With Portland, he had a 5–6 record and a 3.66 ERA in 16 games. After the season, he, along with Rich Hand, were noted as two of the Indians' top pitching prospects.

Austin started the 1970 season with the Wichita Aeros, and pitched in six games before being promoted to the major leagues. He made his debut on June 21, and finished the season with a 2–5 record and a 4.79 ERA in 31 games. The following season, he had a 5.09 ERA in 23 games, and was sent back to Wichita to finish up the year. Partway through the 1973 season, the Indians released him, and he was signed by the Milwaukee Brewers, finishing the year with the Evansville Triplets.

In 1974, Austin moved to Japan and played for the Hankyu Braves of Nippon Professional Baseball. That year, he had one win, one loss, and a 2.33 ERA in eight games. After the season, the Braves noted that they had "purchased two mistakes" by signing him and Gene Ammann due to Austin's control problems. He returned to the states and rejoined the Brewers in 1975, and the next two seasons he split time between the majors and minors. He had a 2–3 record and a 4.05 ERA in 32 games in 1975, and a 5.06 ERA in three games in 1976, retiring after the season ended.
