= Ron Theobald =

American baseball player (1943-2016)

- Second baseman
- Born: July 28, 1943; Oakland, California, U.S.
- Died: April 14, 2016 (aged 72); Walnut Creek, California, U.S.
- Batted: Right Threw: Right

MLB debut
- April 12, 1971, for the Milwaukee Brewers

Last MLB appearance
- October 4, 1972, for the Milwaukee Brewers

MLB statistics
- Batting average: .248
- Home runs: 2
- Runs batted in: 42
- Stolen bases: 11
- Stats at Baseball Reference

Teams
- Milwaukee Brewers (1971–1972)

Ronald Merrill Theobald (July 28, 1943 – April 14, 2016) was an American second baseman in Major League Baseball who played for the Milwaukee Brewers during the early 1970s. He was born in Oakland, California, and died in Walnut Creek, California.

== Early life ==
Theobald was born in Oakland, California, and graduated from Harry Ells High School in Richmond, California, in 1961.

He played college baseball at the University of Arizona.

== Career ==
He was signed as a free agent by the Chicago Cubs in April 1964.

Later that year, he was drafted from the Cubs by the Minnesota Twins in the First-Year Player Draft.

In March 1970, Theobald was purchased by the Washington Senators. On May 11, 1970, he was traded, along with Hank Allen, to the Milwaukee Brewers for Wayne Comer.

Theobald made his MLB debut on April 12, 1971, with the Brewers and played for two seasons before retiring in 1973.

Theobald was given the nickname “The Little General” by Milwaukee Brewers radio broadcast announcer Bob Uecker.

Theobald died in Walnut Creek, California, on April 14, 2016, at the age of 72.
