= Vince Colbert =

American baseball player (born 1945)

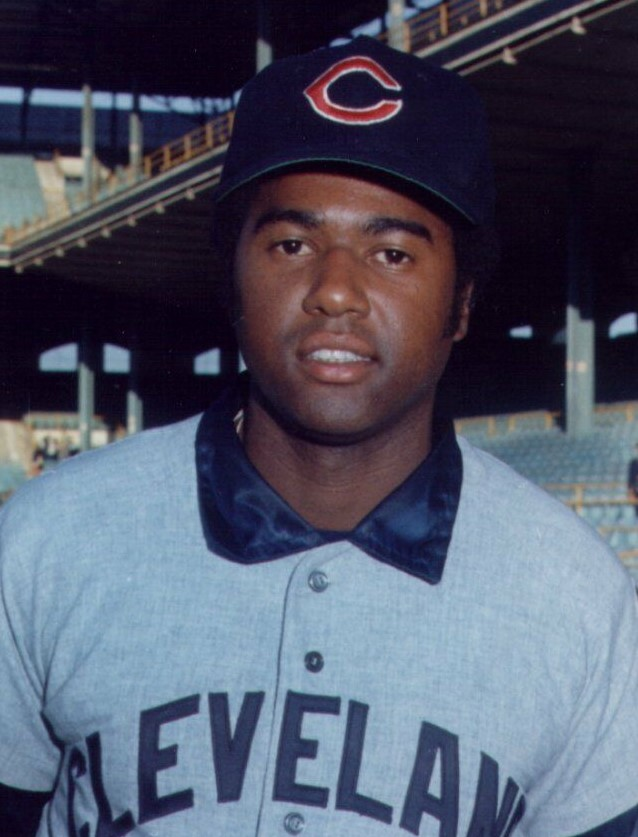
- Pitcher
- Born: December 20, 1945 (age 80); Washington, D.C., U.S.
- Batted: Right Threw: Right

MLB debut
- May 19, 1970, for the Cleveland Indians

Last MLB appearance
- September 16, 1972, for the Cleveland Indians

MLB statistics
- Win–loss record: 9–14
- Earned run average: 4.57
- Strikeouts: 127
- Stats at Baseball Reference

Teams
- Cleveland Indians (1970–1972)

Vincent Norman Colbert (born December 20, 1945) is an American former Major League Baseball pitcher who appeared in 95 total games, 74 as a relief pitcher, for the Cleveland Indians from 1970 to 1972. Born in Washington, D.C., he threw and batted right-handed, and was listed as 6 feet 4 inches (1.93 m) tall and 200 pounds (91 kg).

Colbert is a member of the Class of 1968 at East Carolina University, where he was the first African-American to receive an athletic scholarship and starred in both baseball and basketball. He was selected by Cleveland in the 11th round of the 1968 Major League Baseball draft, and in his first pro campaign posted a 10–2 won–lost record and 1.95 earned run average, with 99 strikeouts in 97 innings pitched, in the Class A Western Carolinas League. He made his MLB debut with the Indians in the middle of his third pro season in May 1970, getting into 23 games as a rookie, all of them in relief.

Colbert's only full major-league season came in 1971. Pitching for a last-place Indians team that lost 102 games, he posted a 7–6 record with two saves and a 3.97 ERA in 50 appearances. He was one of only three Cleveland pitchers to have a winning record that season. However, 1972 saw Colbert's performance fall to a 1–7 (4.58) record in 22 appearances. His lone victory, in a starting assignment June 15 against the California Angels at Anaheim Stadium, was a complete game shutout, a five-hit, 1–0 triumph. It was Colbert's last big-league win and only shutout. He spent part of the season at Triple-A Portland, where also struggled. He was traded to the Texas Rangers in November and then reacquired by the Indians in March 1973. But he never again appeared in the major leagues.

For his career, Colbert won nine games, lost 14, and posted four saves and three career complete games, with an earned run average of 4.57. In 248⅓ innings pitched, he allowed 251 hits and 125 bases on balls, and struck out 127. He retired from pro ball in 1974 and was elected to the East Carolina University Athletics Hall of Fame in 2009.
