= Ted Ford =

American baseball player (1947–2025)

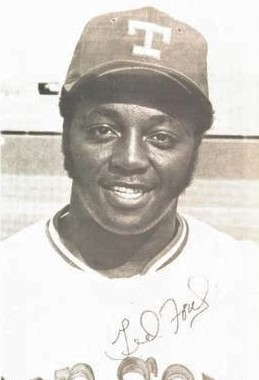
- Ford in 1972
- Outfielder
- Born: February 7, 1947; Vineland, New Jersey, U.S.
- Died: September 15, 2025 (aged 78); Austin, Texas, U.S.
- Batted: Right Threw: Right

MLB debut
- April 7, 1970, for the Cleveland Indians

Last MLB appearance
- September 29, 1973, for the Cleveland Indians

MLB statistics
- Batting average: .219
- Home runs: 17
- Runs batted in: 68
- Stats at Baseball Reference

Teams
- Cleveland Indians (1970–1971, 1973); Texas Rangers (1972)

Theodore Henry Ford (February 7, 1947 – September 15, 2025) was an American right-handed Major League Baseball outfielder who played for the Cleveland Indians and Texas Rangers from 1970 to 1973.

== Career ==
Drafted by the Indians 11th overall in the 1966 amateur draft, Ford began his professional career with the Dubuque Packers. In 71 games with them in 1966, he hit .263 with six home runs and 25 RBI in 262 at-bats.

The following year, 1967, he played for the Pawtucket Indians. He hit only .210 in 443 at-bats with them.

He missed the entire 1968 and 1969 seasons due to military service.

In 1970, he mostly played for the Wichita Aeros, hitting .326 with 12 home runs and 57 RBI in 383 at-bats with them. However, he started the season with the big league club. On April 7, he made his major league debut with the Indians. Facing star pitcher Dave McNally of the Baltimore Orioles, he went 0–2 with a walk in his first game.

He spent time in both the majors and minors in 1971 as well. In the majors, he hit .194 in 196 at-bats. In the minors - playing for the Aeros again - he hit .330 in 176 at-bats.

On April 3, 1972, Ford was traded to the Texas Rangers for Roy Foster and Tommy McCraw. He played in 129 games with the Rangers that year, the franchise's inaugural campaign, hitting 14 home runs and driving 50 runs in in 429 at-bats. His batting average was .235. Ford spent nine games with the Denver Bears that year as well, hitting .222 in 36 at-bats.

Ford returned to the Indians along with Dick Bosman from the Rangers for Steve Dunning on May 10, 1973. He appeared in only 11 big league games that season, hitting .225 in 40 at-bats. He played his final game on September 29.

Although his major league career was over after 1973, on April 24, 1974, Ford was traded back to the Rangers for Charlie Hudson. He spent the 1974 season playing for Cleveland's AAA affiliate, the Oklahoma City 89ers, and the Hawaii Islanders, a San Diego Padres' AAA team. He spent the next eight seasons playing in the Mexican League, before retiring from baseball after the 1982 season.

Overall, Ford hit .219 in 240 major league games. In 711 at-bats, he hit 17 home runs and drove in 68 runs.

== Personal life and death ==
Following his playing career, Ford coached youth baseball in his native New Jersey and then at Huston-Tillotson University, an NAIA school, where he coached his youngest son, Tim.

He was the grandfather of Darren Ford, who played two seasons for the San Francisco Giants in 2010 and 2011.

Ford died in Austin, Texas, on September 15, 2025, at the age of 78.
