= 1975 California Angels season =

Major League Baseball season

1975 California Angels
- League: American League
- Division: West
- Ballpark: Anaheim Stadium
- City: Anaheim, California
- Record: 72–89 (.447)
- Divisional place: 6th
- Owner: Gene Autry
- General manager: Harry Dalton
- Manager: Dick Williams
- Television: KTLA
- Radio: KMPC (Dick Enberg, Dave Niehaus, Don Drysdale)
- Stats: ESPN.com; Baseball Reference

The 1975 California Angels season was the 15th season of the Angels franchise in the American League, the 10th in Anaheim, and their 10th season playing their home games at Anaheim Stadium. The Angels finished the season sixth in the American League West with a record of 72 wins and 89 losses.

California hit 55 home runs for the entire season. This caused Boston Red Sox pitcher Bill Lee to say about the team- "could take batting practice in a hotel lobby without damaging a chandelier."

== Offseason ==
- October 24, 1974: Paul Schaal was released by the Angels.
- January 9, 1975: Derek Botelho was drafted by the Angels in the 4th round of the 1975 Major League Baseball draft secondary phase, but did not sign.
- March 31, 1975: Horacio Piña was released by the Angels.

== Regular season ==
=== Season standings ===
AL West
Team	W	L	Pct.	GB	Home	Road
Oakland Athletics	98	64	.605	—	54‍–‍27	44‍–‍37
Kansas City Royals	91	71	.562	7	51‍–‍30	40‍–‍41
Texas Rangers	79	83	.488	19	39‍–‍41	40‍–‍42
Minnesota Twins	76	83	.478	20½	39‍–‍43	37‍–‍40
Chicago White Sox	75	86	.466	22½	42‍–‍39	33‍–‍47
California Angels	72	89	.447	25½	35‍–‍46	37‍–‍43

=== Record vs. opponents ===
1975 American League record Sources:
Team	BAL	BOS	CAL	CWS	CLE	DET	KC	MIL	MIN	NYY	OAK	TEX
Baltimore	—	9–9	6–6	7–4	10–8	12–4	7–5	14–4	6–6	8–10	4–8	7–5
Boston	9–9	—	6–6	8–4	7–11	13–5	7–5	10–8	10–2	11–5	6–6	8–4
California	6–6	6–6	—	9–9	3–9	6–5	4–14	7–5	8–10	7–5	7–11	9–9
Chicago	4–7	4–8	9–9	—	7–5	5–7	9–9	8–4	9–9	6–6	9–9	5–13
Cleveland	8–10	11–7	9–3	5–7	—	12–6	6–6	9–9	3–6	9–9	2–10	5–7
Detroit	4–12	5–13	5–6	7–5	6–12	—	6–6	7–11	4–8	6–12	6–6	1–11
Kansas City	5–7	5–7	14–4	9–9	6–6	6–6	—	7–5	11–7	7–5	11–7	14–4
Milwaukee	4–14	8–10	5–7	4–8	9–9	11–7	5–7	—	2–10	9–9	5–7	6–6
Minnesota	6–6	2–10	10–8	9–9	6–3	8–4	7–11	10–2	—	4–8	6–12	8–10
New York	10–8	5–11	5–7	6–6	9–9	12–6	5–7	9–9	8–4	—	6–6	8–4
Oakland	8–4	6–6	11–7	9–9	10–2	6–6	11–7	7–5	12–6	6–6	—	12–6
Texas	5–7	4–8	9–9	13–5	7–5	11–1	4–14	6–6	10–8	4–8	6–12	—

=== Notable transactions ===
- June 14, 1975: Denny Doyle was traded by the Angels to the Boston Red Sox for a player to be named later and cash. The Red Sox completed the deal by sending Chuck Ross (minors) to the Angels on March 5, 1976.
- September 12, 1975: Joe Pactwa was purchased by the Angels from the Alijadores de Tampico.
- September 17, 1975: Bobby Valentine and a player to be named later were traded by the Angels to the San Diego Padres for Gary Ross. The Angels completed the deal by sending Rudy Meoli to the Padres on November 4.

==== Draft picks ====
- June 3, 1975: 1975 Major League Baseball draft
  - Danny Goodwin was drafted by the Angels in the 1st round (1st pick).
  - Paul Hartzell was drafted by the Angels in the 10th round.

=== Roster ===
1975 California Angels
Roster
Pitchers: 47 Steve Blateric; 34 Jim Brewer; 29 Chuck Dobson; 37 Ed Figueroa; 42 Andy Hassler; 46 Chuck Hockenbery; 41 Charlie Hudson; 33 Don Kirkwood; 35 Dick Lange; 43 Sid Monge; 34 Joe Pactwa; 28 Orlando Peña; 44 Luis Quintana; 47 Gary Ross; 30 Nolan Ryan; 19 Mickey Scott; 29 Dave Sells; 48 Bill Singer; 40 Frank Tanana	Catchers: 18 Bob Allietta; 10 Tom Egan; 8 Andy Etchebarren; 15 Ike Hampton; 6 Ellie Rodríguez; 9 Bill Sudakis; Infielders: 22 Bruce Bochte; 38 Dan Briggs; 7 Dave Chalk; 5 John Doherty; 15 Denny Doyle; 10 Adrian Garrett; 31 Tommy Harper; 12 Winston Llenas; 3 Rudy Meoli; 21 Mike Miley; 1 Orlando Ramírez; 2 Jerry Remy; 14 Billy Smith; 11 Bobby Valentine	Outfielders: 9 John Balaz; 28 Dave Collins; 29 Paul Dade; 15 Ron Jackson; 4 Joe Lahoud; 16 Morris Nettles; 17 Mickey Rivers; 36 Leroy Stanton; Other batters: 20 Danny Goodwin	Manager: 23 Dick Williams; Coaches: 25 Jerry Adair; 24 Whitey Herzog; 26 Billy Muffett; 50 Jimmie Reese; 27 Grover Resinger

== Player stats ==
=== Batting ===
==== Starters by position ====
Note: Pos = Position; G = Games played; AB = At bats; H = Hits; Avg. = Batting average; HR = Home runs; RBI = Runs batted in

Pos	Player	G	AB	H	Avg.	HR	RBI
C	Ellie Rodríguez	90	226	53	.235	3	27
1B	Bruce Bochte	107	375	107	.285	3	48
2B	Jerry Remy	147	569	147	.258	1	46
SS	Mike Miley	70	224	39	.174	4	26
3B	Dave Chalk	149	513	140	.273	3	56
LF	Dave Collins	93	319	85	.266	3	29
CF	Mickey Rivers	155	616	175	.284	1	53
RF	Leroy Stanton	137	440	115	.261	14	82
DH	Tommy Harper	89	285	68	.239	3	31

==== Other batters ====
Note: G = Games played; AB = At bats; H = Hits; Avg. = Batting average; HR = Home runs; RBI = Runs batted in

Player	G	AB	H	Avg.	HR	RBI
Morris Nettles	112	294	68	.231	0	23
Joe Lahoud	76	192	41	.214	6	33
Billy Smith	59	143	29	.203	0	14
Rudy Meoli	70	126	27	.214	0	6
John Balaz	45	120	29	.242	1	10
Winston Llenas	56	113	21	.186	0	11
Adrian Garrett	37	107	28	.262	6	18
Andy Etchebarren	31	100	28	.280	3	17
Orlando Ramírez	44	100	24	.240	0	4
John Doherty	30	94	19	.202	1	12
Tom Egan	28	70	16	.229	0	3
Ike Hampton	31	66	10	.152	0	4
Bill Sudakis	30	58	7	.121	1	6
Bobby Valentine	26	57	16	.281	0	5
Bob Allietta	21	45	8	.178	1	2
Ron Jackson	13	39	9	.231	0	2
Paul Dade	11	30	6	.200	0	1
Dan Briggs	13	31	7	.226	1	3
Denny Doyle	8	15	1	.067	0	0
Danny Goodwin	4	10	1	.100	0	0

=== Pitching ===
= Indicates league leader

==== Starting pitchers ====
Note: G = Games pitched; IP = Innings pitched; W = Wins; L = Losses; ERA = Earned run average; SO = Strikeouts

Player	G	IP	W	L	ERA	SO
Frank Tanana	34	257.1	16	9	2.62	269
Ed Figueroa	33	244.2	16	13	2.91	139
Nolan Ryan	28	198.0	14	12	3.45	186
Bill Singer	29	179.0	7	15	4.98	78
Joe Pactwa	4	16.1	1	0	3.86	3
Gary Ross	1	5.0	0	1	5.40	4

==== Other pitchers ====
Note: G = Games pitched; IP = Innings pitched; W = Wins; L = Losses; ERA = Earned run average; SO = Strikeouts

Player	G	IP	W	L	ERA	SO
Andy Hassler	30	133.1	3	12	5.94	82
Dick Lange	30	102.0	4	6	5.21	45
Chuck Hockenbery	16	41.0	0	5	5.27	15
Chuck Dobson	9	28.0	0	2	6.75	14
Sid Monge	4	23.2	0	2	4.18	17
Charlie Hudson	3	5.2	0	1	9.53	0

==== Relief pitchers ====
Note: G = Games pitched; W = Wins; L = Losses; SV = Saves; ERA = Earned run average; SO = Strikeouts

Player	G	W	L	SV	ERA	SO
Don Kirkwood	44	6	5	7	3.11	49
Mickey Scott	50	4	2	1	3.29	31
Jim Brewer	21	1	0	5	1.82	22
Orlando Peña	7	0	2	0	2.13	4
Dave Sells	4	0	0	0	8.64	7
Luis Quintana	4	0	2	0	6.43	5
Steve Blateric	2	0	0	0	6.23	5

== Farm system ==
Level	Team	League	Manager
AAA	Salt Lake City Gulls	Pacific Coast League	Norm Sherry
AA	El Paso Diablos	Texas League	Jimy Williams
A	Salinas Packers	California League	Buck Rodgers
A	Quad Cities Angels	Midwest League	Bobby Knoop
Rookie	Idaho Falls Angels	Pioneer League	Larry Himes

Records
Preceded by 1974	California Angels seasons 1975	Succeeded by 1976
