= Dan Briggs =

Dan Briggs may refer to:

- Dan Briggs (musician) (born 1985), bassist for Between the Buried and Me
- Dan Briggs (baseball) (born 1952), Major League Baseball first baseman
- Dan Briggs (character), a fictional character in the TV series Mission: Impossible
