= Tri-Valley Conference (Michigan) =

The Tri-Valley Conference is a school sports league within the Michigan High School Athletic Association (MHSAA), located in the Saginaw, Bay, and Midland areas of Michigan, United States.

== Member schools ==
=== Current members ===
School	Location	County	Enrollment	Class	Joined	Previous conference
West Division (TVC 10)
Hemlock Huskies	Hemlock	Saginaw	306	C	1979	Mid-Michigan Conference – B
Ithaca Yellowjackets	Ithaca	Gratiot	302	C	2006	Central State Activities Association
Saginaw Michigan Lutheran Seminary Cardinals	Saginaw	Saginaw	175	D	1989	Central Michigan League
Saginaw Nouvel Catholic Central Panthers	Saginaw Township	Saginaw	204	C	2018	Independent
Saginaw Valley Lutheran Chargers	Saginaw Township	Saginaw	276	C	2006	Great Thumb Conference
St. Louis Sharks	St. Louis	Gratiot	301	C	2006	Central State Activities Association
Midland Bullock Creek Lancers	Homer Township	Midland	494	B	1979	Mid-Michigan Conference – B
Standish-Sterling Panthers	Deep River Township	Arenac	457	B	2016	Independent
Millington Cardinals	Millington	Tuscola	369	C	1991	Thumb B League
Carrollton Cavaliers	Carrollton Township	Saginaw	489	B	1979	Northern B Conference
East Division (TVC 8)
Birch Run Panthers	Birch Run	Saginaw	583	B	1979	Five County 5 League
Bridgeport Bearcats	Bridgeport	Saginaw	529	B	1994	Independent
Essexville Garber Dukes	Essexville	Bay	540	B	1979	Northern B Conference
Frankenmuth Eagles	Frankenmuth	Saginaw	539	B	1979	Thumb B League
Alma Panthers	Alma	Gratiot	581	B	2006	Mid-Michigan Conference – B
Bay City John Glenn Bobcats	Bangor Township	Bay	801	B	2020	Saginaw Valley League
Freeland Falcons	Freeland	Saginaw	644	B	1989	Central Michigan League
Saginaw Swan Valley Vikings	Thomas Township	Saginaw	542	B	1979	Mid-Michigan Conference – B

Starting in 2024, Standish-Sterling, Bullock Creek, St. Louis all left to join the Jack Pine Conference. Birch Run left to join the Mid-Michigan Activities Conference and Millington left to join the Big Thumb Conference.

St. Charles left following the 2020 year. Bay City John Glenn joined to replace them.

*Shepherd & Pinconning have announced they will be departing following the 2018–2019 school year. Both schools will join the Jack Pine Conference of northern lower Michigan. After this the TVC went through a re-alignment. The Central and East merged. Midland Bullock Creek, Carrollton, Standish-Sterling, and Millington all moved to the west, and Bay City John Glenn joined the east.

=== Former members ===
Team	Location	Joined	Previous conference	Departed	Successive conference
St. Charles Bulldogs	St. Charles	1989	Central Michigan League	2020	Mid-State Athletic Conference
Breckenridge Huskies	Breckenridge	2006	Central State Activities Association	2016	Mid-State Athletic Conference
Chesaning Indians	Chesaning	2006	Mid-Michigan Conference B	2018	Mid-Michigan Activities Conference
Caro Tigers	Caro	1991	Thumb B League	2018	Greater Thumb Conference
Merrill Vandals	Merrill	1989	Central Michigan League	2016	Mid-State Athletic Conference
North Branch Broncos	North Branch	1991	Thumb B League	2018	Blue Water Area Conference
Otisville LakeVille Falcons	Forest Township	2013	Genesee Area Conference	2016	Genesee Area Conference
Ovid-Elsie Marauders	Duplain Township	2006	Central State Activities Association	2018	Mid-Michigan Activities Conference
Pinconning Spartans	Pinconning	2016	Independent	2020	Jack Pine Conference
Shepherd Bluejays	Shepherd	2006	Central State Activities Association	2020	Jack Pine Conference
Vassar Vulcans	Vassar	1991	Thumb B League	2008	Greater Thumb Conference

== Athletics History ==
=== Basketball ===
Conference Champions (Girls Basketball)
	East	Coach	West		Coach		Season End
20–21	Frankenmuth	Joe Jacobs	Standish-Sterling		Denny Wendel		Frankenmuth: (QF loss to Portland) Standish-Sterling: (Reg Semi loss to Ludington)
21–22	Frankenmuth 22–3 (14–0)	Joe Jacobs (2)	Saginaw Nouvel 20–4 (17–1)		Thomas Kramer		Muth: (QF loss to Ludington) Nouvel: (Reg Final loss to Fowler)
	East	Coach	West – Tier I	Coach	West – Tier II	Coach	Season End
22–23	Frankenmuth 25–3 (14–0)	Joe Jacobs (3)	Hemlock 26–3 (8–0)	Scott Neumeyer	Valley Lutheran 20–4 (7–1)	Matthew Princing	FM: (Finals loss to Lansing Catholic) HEM: (D3 State Champs) VL: (Dist. Semi loss to Hemlock)

20–21: Saginaw Nouvel reached #1 in the AP Poll before losing in the quarterfinal.

Conference Champions (Boys Basketball)
	East	Coach	Central	Coach	West	Coach	Season End
11–12	Bridgeport 20–2 (12–0)	Jason Kowalski	Hemlock 19–5 (11–3)	Matt Bauer	MLS 20–5 (13–1)	David Lecker	BP (Dist final loss to Carrollton) HEM (Reg semi loss to Muskegon Heights) MLS (QF loss to Southfield Christian)
12–13	Frankenmuth 15–6 (10–2) Bridgeport	Andrew Donovan Jason Kowalski	Hemlock 19–4 (11–3) Shepherd 15–8 (11–3)	Matt Bauer Ryan Huber	Ithaca 18–4 (13–1)	James Thompson	FM (Dist QF loss to Caro) BP (Dist final loss to Swan Valley) HEM (Dist final loss to VL) S (Dist final loss to Alma) IHS (Dist final loss to Beaverton)
13–14	Millington 23–2 (14–0)	Shane Levan	Hemlock 19–5 (14–0)	Matt Bauer	Saginaw Valley Lutheran 18–3 (14–0)	Randy Rogers	MHS (Reg final loss to Goodrich) HEM (Reg semi loss to Montrose) VL (Dist QF loss to Hemlock)
14–15	Frankenmuth 18–5 (12–2)	Andrew Donovan	Alma 18–5 (12–2)	JT Cleveland	Ithaca 21–3 (13–1) MLS 22–3 (13–1)	James Thompson David Lecker	FM (Reg semi loss to Goodrich) A (Reg semi loss to Wyoming Godwin Heights) IHS (Reg semi loss to MLS) MLS (Reg final loss to Millington)
15–16	Frankenmuth 20–3 (12–2) Birch Run 19–3 (12–2)	Andrew Donovan Clark Plitchta	Alma 19–4 (13–0)	JT Cleveland	Ithaca 23–3 (14–0)	James Thompson	FM (Dist. finals loss to Flint Northwestern) BR (Dist. finals loss to Freeland) A (Reg. finals loss to Garber) IHS (QF loss to Flint Beecher)
16–17	Bridgeport 19–3 (13–1) Frankenmuth 21–3 (13–1)	Eugene Seals Andrew Donovan	Freeland 20–3 (13–1)	Kevin Bourcier	Ithaca 20–3 (13–1)	James Thompson	BP (Dist. Finals Loss to Muth) FM (Reg. Finals Loss to Lake Fenton) F (Reg. Semi. Loss to Lake Fenton) I (Dist. Finals Loss to Alma)
17–18	Bridgeport 24–2 (12–0)	Kevin Marshall	Alma 18–6 (11–3) Swan Valley (11–3)	JT Cleveland Luke Hendrick	Ovid-Elsie 18–5 (13–1)	Josh Latz	BP (QF Loss to New Haven) A (Reg. Semi. Loss to Standish-Sterling) SV (Dist. Final Loss to Freeland) OE (Reg. Semi. Loss to Bridgeport)
18–19	Bridgeport 22–1 (10–0)	Kevin Marshall (2)	Alma 19–4 (7–3) Freeland 12–9 (7–3) Swan Valley 12–9 (7–3)	JT Cleveland (2) Kevin Bourcier (2) Luke Hendrick (2)	Valley Lutheran 18–4 (13–1)	Joel Erdmann	BP (Reg. Semi. Loss to Alma) A (QF Loss to Ludington) F (Dist. Final Loss to Garber) SV (Dist. Semi. Loss to Freeland) VL (Dist. Semi Loss to Reese)
	East	Coach	West	Coach		Season End	
19–20	Bridgeport (13–1)	Kevin Marshall (3)	Carrollton (17–1) Hemlock (17–1)	Zak Zuzula Matt Bauer		COVID cancelled postseason	
20–21	Frankenmuth 14–2 (11–1)	Andrew Donovan (2)	Hemlock 17–1 (9–0)	Matt Bauer (2)		Muth (Dist. Semi. Loss to Bridgeport) Hemlock (Dist. Finals Loss to Reese)	
21–22	Freeland 25–1 (14–0)	John Fattal	Carrollton 17–4 (17–1) Standish-Sterling Central 22–2 (17–1)	Zak Zuzula (2) Matt Koin		Freeland (State Semi. loss to Williamston) Carrollton (Dist. Semi. loss to Garber) SSC (Reg. Semi loss to Cadillac)	
	East	Coach	West – Tier I	Coach	West – Tier II	Coach	Season End
22–23	Bridgeport 20–5 (13–1)	Kevin Marshall (4)	Standish-Sterling 22–1 (8–0)	Matt Koin (2)	Nouvel 21–5 (8–0)	Michael Kessler	Bridgeport (Reg. Semi loss to Hamady) Standish (Reg. Semi loss to Cadillac) Nouvel (Reg. Final loss to Beecher)

19–20: Carrollton went as high as #4 in the AP Poll.

20–21: Covid shortened season.

20–21: Bridgeport went 10–2 in the conference and coach Kevin Marshall took the Bearcats to the state semis where they lost to Battle Creek Pennfield. Carrollton lost their lone conference game with Hemlock and went to the regional finals before losing to BP, 54–53.

21–22: Freeland went to the Breslin center and lost in the state semis.

25-26: Freeland won the Division 2 State Championship

== Football History ==
Conference Champions (Football)
Year	East		Coach	West		Coach	Season End
2004	Birch Run 8–2 (6–1), Garber 8–3 (6–1)		Chris Gilliam, Dave Schwartz	Bullock Creek 13–1 (7–0)		Darren Kalina	BR: (5-Pdis loss to Cass City), GAR: (5-Dist loss to Nouvel), BC: (5-Finals loss to Jackson Lumen Christi)
2005	Birch Run 12–1 (7–0)		Chris Gilliam	Bullock Creek 10–1 (7–0)		Darren Kalina	BR: (5-Semi loss to Jackson Lumen Christi), BC: (5-Reg loss to Menonminee)
Year	East	Coach	Central	Coach	West	Coach	Season End
2006	Birch Run 9–2 (6–1), North Branch 9–2 (6–1)	Chris Gilliam, Eric Hensel	Swan Valley 12–1 (7–0)	Rich Bell	Ithaca 10–1 (7–0)	Terry Hessbrook	BR: (5-Dist. loss to Lake Fenton), NB: (4-Dist. loss to Flint Powers), SV: (5-Semi loss to Menominee), ITH: (6-Dist. loss to St. Charles)
2007	Frankenmuth 8–2 (7–0)	Tim Van Wormer	Alma 11–1 (7–0)	Jeff Intersoll	St. Charles 10–1 (7–0)	Brady Lake	FM: (5-Pdis loss to Chesaning), A: (4-Reg loss to Marine City), STC: (6-Dist. loss to Nouvel)
2008	Millington 8–2 (6–1)	Tim Furno	Freeland 10–2 (7–0)	Kevin Townsend	Carrollton 8–2 (7–0)	Greg Wasmer	MIL: (5-Pdis loss to Garber), FL: (5-Reg loss to Ovid-Elsie), CAR: (6-Dist. loss to Nouvel)
2009	Garber 7–3 (6–0)	Dave Schwartz	Ovid-Elsie 11–1 (7–0)	Jerry Goosen	Carrollton 8–2 (6–1), Ithaca 11–2 (6–1), St. Charles 10–2 (6–1)	Greg Wasmer, Terry Hessbrook, Brady Lake	GAR: (4-PDist. loss to Central Montcalm), OE: (5-Reg loss to Millington), CAR: (5-PDist. loss to Millington), IHS: (6-Semi loss to Montague), STC: (6-Reg loss to Ithaca)
2010	Millington 11–2 (6–0)	Roger Bearss	Freeland 7–3 (6–1)	Kevin Townsend	**Ithaca 14–0 (7–0)**	**Terry Hessbrook**	FL: (5-Pdist. loss to Swan Valley), MIL: (5-Semi loss to Olivet), **ITH: (D6 State Champions)**
2011	Millington 10–1 (6–0)	Roger Bearss	Freeland 8–3 (6–1), Ovid-Elsie 6–4 (6–1)	Kevin Townsend, Travis Long	**Ithaca 14–0 (7–0)**	**Terry Hessbrook**	MIL: (5-Dist. loss to Flint Powers), FL: (5-Dist. loss to Hemlock), OE: (5-Dist. loss to Portland, **ITH: (D6 State Champions)**
2012	Frankenmuth 10–1 (6–0)	Tim Van Wormer	Hemlock 9–2 (7–0)	Bruce Bendix	**Ithaca 14–0 (7–0)**	**Terry Hessbrook**	FM: (5-Dist. loss to Flint Powers), HEM: (6-Dist. loss to Ithaca), **ITH: (D6 State Champions)**
2013	Frankenmuth 9–2 (7–0)	Phil Martin	Swan Valley 11–1 (7–0)	Ken Bourbina	**Ithaca 14–0 (7–0)**	**Terry Hessbrook**	FM: (5-Dist. loss to Millington), SV: (4-Reg loss to Lansing Sexton), **IHS: (D6 State Champion)**
2014	Birch Run 7–3 (6–1) Frankenmuth 9–2 (6–1) Millington 9–2 (6–1)	Chris Gilliam, Roger Bearss, Phil Martin	Swan Valley 10–1 (7–0)	Ken Bourbina	Ithaca 13–1 (7–0)	Terry Hessbrook	BR: (5-PDist. loss to Flint Powers), MIL: (6-Dist. loss to Ithaca), FM: (5-Dist. loss to Flint Powers), SV: (4-Dist loss to Lansing Sexton), IHS: (6-Finals loss to Monroe St. Marys)
2015	Frankenmuth 9–2 (7–0)	Phil Martin	Freeland 11–1 (7–0)	Kevin Townsend	**Ithaca 14–0 (7–0)**	**Terry Hessbrook**	FM: (5-Dist. Loss to Freeland), FL: (5-Reg Loss to GR Catholic Central), **IHS (State Champion Division 6)**
2016	Frankenmuth 11–2 (7–0)	Phil Martin	Freeland 10–1 (7–0)	Kevin Townsend	Ithaca 11–1 (7–0)	Terry Hessbrook	FM: (5-Semi Loss to Menominee), FL: (5-Dist. Loss to Frankenmuth), IHS (5-Reg Loss to Frankenmuth)
2017	Frankenmuth 12–1 (6–0)	Phil Martin	Swan Valley 12–2 (7–0)	Kevin Gavenda	Ithaca 13–1 (7–0)	Terry Hessbrook	FM: (5-Semi Loss to GR West Catholic), SV: (5-Finals Loss to GR West Catholic), IHS (6-Finals Loss to Jackson Lumen Christi)
2018	Frankenmuth 9–3 (5–0)	Phil Martin	Swan Valley 12–1 (7–0)	Kevin Gavenda	Ithaca 8–2 (7–0)	Terry Hessbrook	FM: (5-Reg Loss to Portland) SV: (5-Semi Loss to Hudsonville Unity Christian), IHS (6-PDist. Loss to Millington)
Year	East	Coach	West – I	Coach	West – II	Coach	Season End
2019	Frankenmuth (9–2)	Phil Martin	Ithaca (8–2)	Terry Hessbrook	Hemlock (8–3)	Aaron Clark	Muth (5-Dist. Loss to Swan Valley), Ithaca (6-PDist. Loss to Meridian), Hemlock (6-Dist. Loss to Meridian)
2020	Frankenmuth (11–1)	Phil Martin	Hemlock (8–3)	Aaron Clark	Ithaca (9–1)	Terry Hessbrook	Muth (5-Finals Loss to GRCC), Hem. (7-Dist. Loss to Cass City), Ithaca (7-Reg Loss to Cass City)
2021	Frankenmuth (12–1)	Phil Martin	Millington (10–1)	Lenny Dantinne	Ithaca (6–4)	Jordan Hessbrook	Muth (5-Semi Loss to GRCC), Ithaca (7-PDist. Loss to P-W), Mil. (6-Dist. Loss to Lansing Catholic)
2022	Frankenmuth 13–1 (8–0)	Phil Martin	Standish-Sterling 8–2 (7–0)	Marty Malcolm	Ithaca 10–2 (7–1)	Jordan Hessbrook	Muth (5-Finals loss to Gladwin), SSC (6-Dist. loss to Millington) IHS (7-Reg loss to TC St. Francis)
2023	Frankenmuth 11–1 (7–0)	Phil Martin	Millington 12–0 (4–0)	Jason Germain	Ithaca 11–1 (4–0)	Jordan Hessbrook	Muth (5-State semis) MIL (7-State semis) IHS (8-Reg loss to Ubly)

Bold: state champion

*Ithaca has won 15 consecutive TVC West championships

^Frankenmuth has won 9 consecutive TVC East championships, and have also won 53 straight TVC matchups, last lost to Millington in '14.
