= Au Sable Township, Michigan =

Au Sable Township is the name of some places in the U.S. state of Michigan:

- Au Sable Township, Iosco County, Michigan
- Au Sable Township, Roscommon County, Michigan
