= Northern Michigan Soccer League =

- Conference: MHSAA
- Sports fielded: 2; men's: 1; women's: 1
- Division: 3 & 4
- No. of teams: 12
- Region: Central & Northern Lower Michigan

Locations
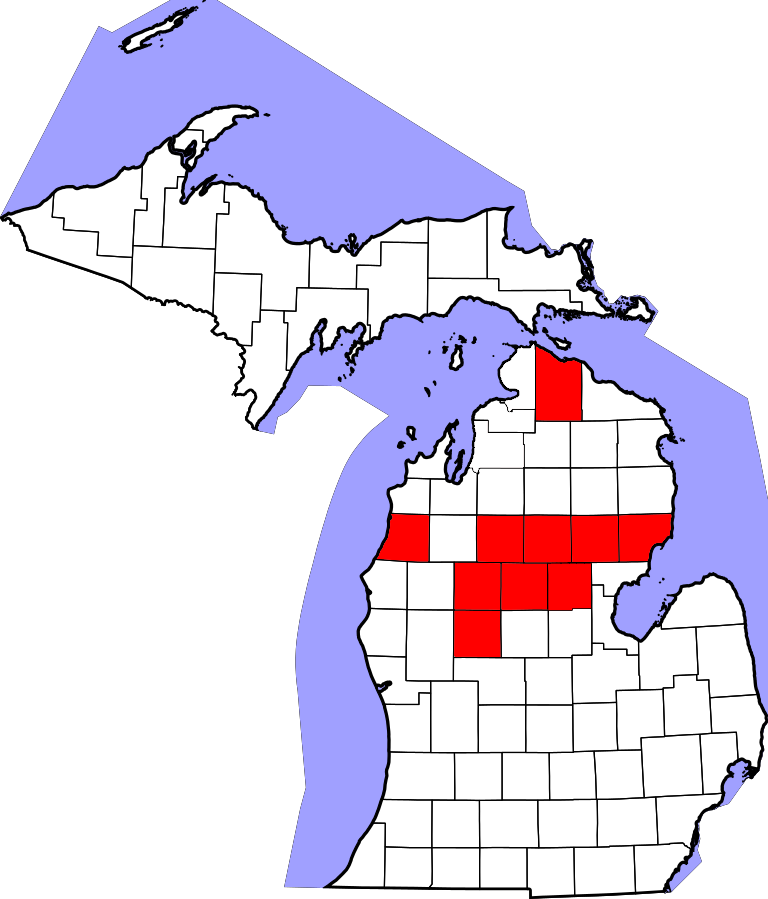

The Northern Michigan Soccer League is a high school boys and girls soccer league located in northern lower Michigan. The league is made up of Division 3 and 4 member high schools. There are 12 members schools that are split into an east and west division. The league is a member of the Michigan High School Athletic Association (MHSAA).

== Member schools ==
School	Nickname	MHSAA Division	2021-22 Enrollment	County	Color	All-Sports Conference
West Division
Big Rapids Crossroads	Cougars	4	341	Mecosta		West Michigan D League
Brethren	Bobcats	4	263	Manistee		West Michigan D League
Clare	Pioneers	3	440	Clare		Jack Pine Conference
Houghton Lake	Bobcats	4	334	Roscommon		Highland Conference
McBain Northern Michigan Christian	Comets	4	74	Missaukee		Highland Conference
Shepherd	Bluejays	3	486	Isabella		Jack Pine Conference
East Division
Burt Lake Northern Michigan Christian	Eagles	4	33	Cheboygan		Northern Lakes Conference
Cheboygan	Chiefs	3	602	Cheboygan		Straits Area Conference
Gladwin	Flying G's	3	510	Gladwin		Jack Pine Conference
Ogemaw Heights	Falcons	3	556	Ogemaw		Independent
Roscommon	Bucks	4	276	Roscommon		Highland Conference
Tawas Area	Braves	4	373	Iosco		Independent
