= Joe Pactwa =

American baseball player (1948–2009)

- Pitcher
- Born: June 2, 1948; Hammond, Indiana, U.S.
- Died: March 10, 2009 (aged 60); Wilmer, Texas, U.S.
- Batted: Left Threw: Left

MLB debut
- September 15, 1975, for the California Angels

Last MLB appearance
- September 28, 1975, for the California Angels

MLB statistics
- Win–loss record: 1-0
- Strikeouts: 3
- Earned run average: 3.86
- Stats at Baseball Reference

Teams
- California Angels (1975)

Joseph Martin Pactwa (June 2, 1948 – March 10, 2009) was an American professional baseball outfielder and pitcher. He was drafted by the New York Yankees and played in their minor league organization for several years before being released in 1974. Pactwa's brief major-league career came with the California Angels during the 1975 season. He got in four games as a pitcher. He was signed as an outfielder but was converted to the mound in 1972. After that, he served as a two-way player in the U.S. minors and in Mexico, where he played both summer and winter ball.

In 1975, Pactwa went 17–6 with a 2.61 ERA and batted .299 with 13 home runs, leading the Alijadores de Tampico to a Mexican League championship.

Pactwa was born in Hammond, Indiana. Listed at 5 ft 11 in (1.80 m), 185 pounds, he batted and threw left-handed.

Pactwa died in Wilmer, Texas, at the age of 60.

== See also ==
- 1975 California Angels season
