= Jack Pine Conference =

- Conference: MHSAA
- Founded: 1972
- Sports fielded: 13; men's: 7; women's: 6
- Division: Class B & C
- No. of teams: 12
- Region: Central & Northern Lower Michigan
- Official website: http://www.jackpineconference.net/

Locations
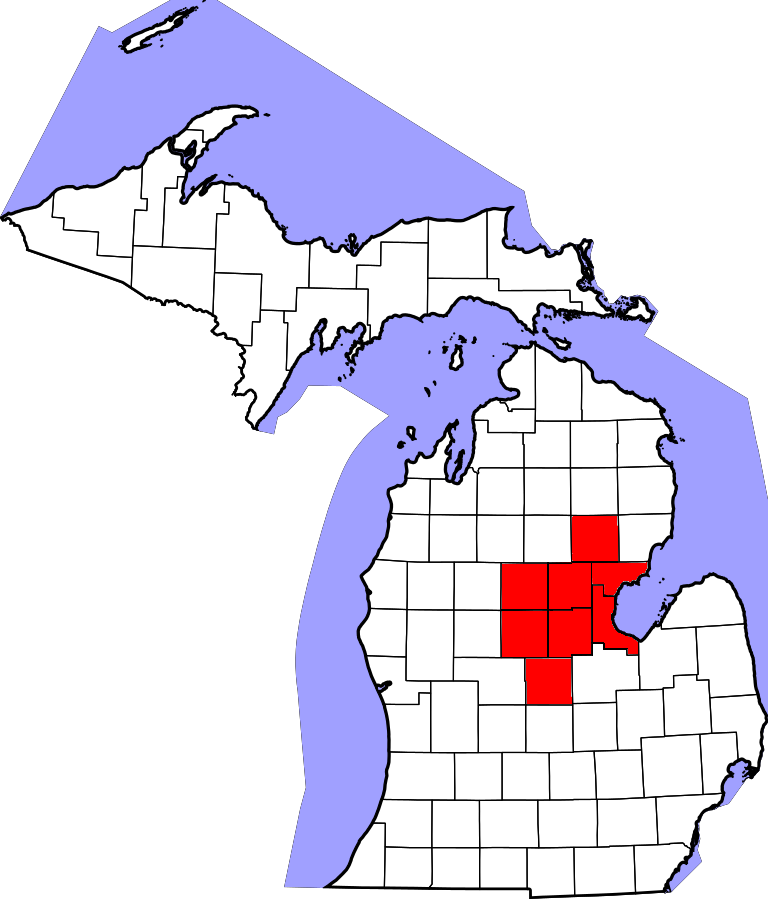

The Jack Pine Conference is a high school athletic conference in northern lower Michigan made up of Class B and C schools. The sports involved include: Football, Basketball, Baseball, Softball, Wrestling, Volleyball, Bowling, Track and Field, Cross Country, and Golf.

== Membership changes (1982–2023) ==
Evart was the first to leave the JPC since its foundation in 1972; Coleman would be the second to do so, leaving in 2002.

Due to declining enrollment, Roscommon and Houghton Lake departed the JPC for the Highland Conference at the start of the 2019–20 academic year. Taking the place of both Roscommon County schools, Pinconning and Shepherd joined the conference at the start of the 2019–2020 academic year. Both departed from the Tri-Valley Conference.

On June 29, 2023, it was announced starting for the 2024–25 academic year four schools will join the JPC. These four schools being Ogemaw Heights, Standish-Sterling, St Louis and Bullock Creek.

== Members ==
School	Nickname	MHSAA Class	Enrollment	County	Colors
Beaverton	Beavers	C	285	Gladwin	
Bullock Creek	Lancers	B	465	Midland	
Clare	Pioneers	B	450	Clare	
Farwell	Eagles	C	270	Clare	
Gladwin	Flying G's	B	507	Gladwin	
Harrison	Hornets	C	331	Clare	
Ogemaw Heights	Falcons	B	542	Ogemaw	
Pinconning	Spartans	B	391	Bay	
St. Louis	Sharks	C	277	Gratiot	
Sanford Meridian	Mustangs	C	353	Midland	
Shepherd	Bluejays	B	501	Isabella	
Standish-Sterling	Panthers	B	446	Arenac	

=== Membership timeline ===
Current member Former member

== State championships ==
Jack Pine Conference member high schools have won the following Michigan High School Athletic Association state championships:

=== Football ===
Year	School	Division/Class
2022	Gladwin Flying G's	Division 5

=== Baseball ===
Year	School	Division/Class
1982	Meridian Mustangs	Class C

=== Softball ===
Year	School	Division/Class
1987	Meridian Mustangs	Class B

=== Boys Track and Field ===
Year	School	Division/Class
2000	Clare Pioneers	Division 3
2014	Meridian Mustangs	Division 3

=== Girls Track and Field ===
Year	School	Division/Class
1994	Clare Pioneers	Class C
1996	Clare Pioneers	Class C

=== Boys Skiing ===
Year	School	Division/Class
2009	Harrison Hornets	Division 2

=== Boys Bowling ===
Year	School	Division/Class
2019	Gladwin Flying G's	Division 3
2022	Gladwin Flying G's	Division 3
2025	Standing-Sterling Panthers	Division 3

=== Girls Bowling ===
Year	School	Division/Class
2022	Shepherd Bluejays	Division 3

== Conference Records ==
Baseball
Year	School
1972	Evart
1973	Meridian
1974	Meridian
1975	Beaverton
1976	Evart
1977	Meridian
1978	Meridian/Roscommon
1980	Meridian
1981	Coleman
1982	Meridian
1983	Meridian
1984	Meridian
1985	Meridian
1986	Meridian
1987	Coleman
1988	Clare/Coleman/Houghton Lake
1989	Clare/Houghton Lake
1990	Beaverton
1991	Clare
1992	Clare/Coleman
1993	Coleman
1994	Coleman
1995	Meridian
1996	Harrison/Meridian
1997	Meridian
1998	Meridian
1999	Clare
2000	Meridian
2001	Clare
2002	Clare
2003	Clare
2004	Gladwin
2005	Meridian
2006	Meridian
2007	Meridian
2008	Clare
2009	Clare
2010	Clare
2011	Clare
2012	Clare
2013	Meridian
2014	Meridian
2015	Clare/Meridian
2016	Clare
2018	Beaverton/Meridian
2019	Beaverton
2021	Pinconning
2022	Clare

Boys' Basketball
Year	School
1972	Farwell
1973	Coleman/Evart
1974	Evart
1975	Houghton Lake
1976	Beaverton
1977	Beaverton/Evart
1978	Beaverton
1979	Meridian
1980	Meridian
1981	Meridian
1982	Meridian
1983	Beaverton
1984	Beaverton
1985	Beaverton
1986	Beaverton
1987	Clare
1988	Coleman
1989	Farwell
1990	Beaverton
1991	Beaverton
1992	Beaverton
1993	Clare/Coleman/Harrison
1994	Harrison
1995	Beaverton
1996	Harrison
1997	Beaverton/Houghton Lake
1998	Beaverton
1999	Beaverton
2000	Meridian
2001	Harrison/Meridian
2002	Beaverton
2003	Beaverton
2004	Houghton Lake
2005	Houghton Lake
2006	Meridian
2007	Beaverton/Roscommon
2008	Meridian
2009	Meridian/Roscommon
2010	Clare/Meridian
2011	Meridian
2012	Clare
2013	Beaverton
2014	Meridian
2015	Beaverton
2016	Beaverton
2017	Meridian
2018	Meridian
2019	Meridian
2020	Meridian
2021	Beaverton
2022	Clare

Girls' Basketball
Year	School
1975	Harrison
1976	Evart/Harrison
1977	Houghton Lake
1979	Houghton Lake
1980	Harrison/Roscommon
1981	Meridian
1982	Roscommon
1983	Meridian
1984	Beaverton
1985	Harrison
1986	Houghton Lake/Meridian
1987	Meridian
1988	Meridian
1989	Meridian
1990	Roscommon
1991	Houghton Lake
1992	Roscommon
1993	Houghton Lake
1994	Harrison
1995	Coleman
1996	Roscommon
1997	Roscommon
1998	Roscommon
1999	Roscommon
2000	Roscommon
2001	Clare
2002	Clare
2003	Beaverton
2004	Clare
2005	Clare
2006	Galdwin
2007	Clare/Meridian
2008	Clare
2009	Houghton Lake
2010	Gladwin
2011	Clare
2012	Clare
2013	Clare
2014	Clare
2015	Beaverton
2016	Gladwin
2017	Clare/Gladwin
2018	Beaverton/Gladwin
2019	Houghton Lake
2020	Beaverton
2021	Beaverton
2022	Meridian

Boys' Bowling
Year	School
2016	Beaverton/Farwell/Harrison
2017	Gladwin
2018	Gladwin
2019	Gladwin
2020	Meridian
2021	Gladwin
2022	Gladwin/Meridian

Girls' Bowling
Year	School
2016	Gladwin
2017	Gladwin
2018	Gladwin
2019	Gladwin
2020	Clare
2021	Clare
2022	Shephard

Boys' Cross Country
Year	School
1989	Beaverton
1990	Beaverton
1991	Clare
1992	Clare
1993	Clare
1994	Clare
1995	Clare
1996	Clare
1997	Clare
1998	Clare
1999	Meridian
2000	Meridian
2001	Clare
2002	Clare
2003	Clare
2004	Clare
2005	Clare
2006	Clare
2007	Clare
2008	Clare
2009	Clare
2010	Clare
2011	Clare
2012	Clare
2013	Clare
2014	Clare
2015	Clare
2016	Clare
2017	Clare
2018	Clare
2019	Shepard
2020	Clare
2021	Gladwin

Girls' Cross Country
Year	School
1989	Beaverton
1990	Beaverton
1991	Clare
1992	Clare
1993	Clare
1994	Clare
1995	Clare
1996	Clare
1997	Clare
1998	Meridian
1999	Meridian
2000	Clare
2001	Clare
2002	Clare
2002	Clare
2004	Clare
2005	Clare
2006	Clare
2007	Clare
2008	Clare
2009	Meridian
2010	Clare
2011	Clare
2012	Clare
2013	Clare
2014	Clare
2015	Clare
2016	Clare
2017	Clare
2018	Clare
2019	Shephard
2020	Shephard
2021	Shephard

Football
Year	School
1971	Houghton Lake
1972	Roscommon
1973	Evart/Meridian
1974	Evart
1975	Roscommon
1976	Evart
1977	Meridian
1978	Roscommon
1979	Houghton Lake
1980	Houghton Lake
1981	Meridian
1982	Roscommon
1983	Houghton Lake
1984	Houghton Lake
1985	Clare
1986	Houghton Lake
1987	Houghton Lake
1988	Houghton Lake
1989	Beaverton
1990	Coleman
1991	Clare
1992	Clare
1993	Harrison
1994	Houghton Lake
1995	Harrison
1996	Clare/Harrison/Houghton Lake
1997	Harrison
1998	Farwell
1999	Harrison
2000	Clare
2001	Clare
2002	Clare/Gladwin/Meridian
2003	Clare
2004	Clare
2005	Houghton Lake/Meridian/Roscommon
2006	Roscommon
2007	Roscommon
2008	Clare
2009	Clare
2010	Clare
2011	Clare
2012	Clare
2013	Clare
2014	Clare
2015	Meridian
2016	Clare
2017	Clare
2018	Beaverton/Clare/Roscommon
2019	Beaverton
2020	Clare
2021	Gladwin
2022	Gladwin
2023	Gladwin
2024	Ogemaw Heights
2025	Ogemaw Heights

Volleyball
Year	School
1986	Meridian
1987	Meridian
1988	Coleman/Meridian
1989	Coleman
1990	Coleman
1991	Coleman
1992	Coleman
1993	Coleman
1994	Coleman
1995	Roscommon
1996	Roscommon
1997	Roscommon
1998	Roscommon
1999	Coleman
2000	Coleman
2001	Clare
2002	Roscommon
2003	Roscommon
2004	Meridian/Roscommon
2005	Meridian
2006	Roscommon
2007	Roscommon
2008	Roscommon
2010	Roscommon
2011	Meridian
2012	Meridian
2013	Roscommon
2014	Roscommon
2015	Roscommon
2016	Roscommon
2018	Houghton Lake
2019	Beaverton
2020	Beaverton
2021	Beaverton

Boys' Track & Field
Year	School
1972	Evart
1973	Beaverton
1974	Beaverton
1975	Coleman
1976	Coleman
1977	Coleman/Meridian
1978	Meridian
1979	Coleman
1980	Beaverton
1981	Beaverton/Houghton Lake
1982	Beaverton
1983	Houghton Lake
1984	Clare/Houghton Lake
1985	Houghton Lake
1986	Clare
1987	Clare
1988	Clare
1989	Clare
1990	Beaverton
1991	Beaverton
1992	Clare
1993	Coleman/Meridian
1994	Meridian
1995	Clare
1996	Clare
1997	Clare
1998	Clare
1999	Clare
2000	Clare
2001	Clare
2002	Clare
2003	Beaverton
2004	Clare
2005	Clare
2006	Clare
2007	Clare/Gladwin
2008	Clare
2009	Clare
2010	Clare
2011	Clare
2012	Clare
2013	Clare/Farwell
2014	Clare
2015	Clare
2016	Clare
2017	Clare
2018	Clare
2019	Clare
2021	Clare/Shephard
2022	Clare

Wrestling
Year	School
2002	Roscommon
2003	Gladwin
2004	Roscommon
2005	Roscommon
2006	Roscommon
2007	Galdwin/Roscommon
2008	Roscommon
2009	Roscommon
2010	Roscommon
2012	Roscommon
2013	Roscommon
2014	Meridian
2015	Meridian
2016	Roscommon
2017	Meridian/Roscommon
2018	Gladwin
2019	Beaverton
2020	Meridian
2022	Clare
