= Gladwin High School =

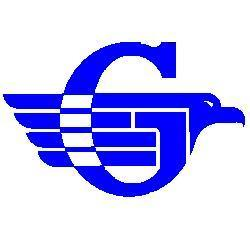

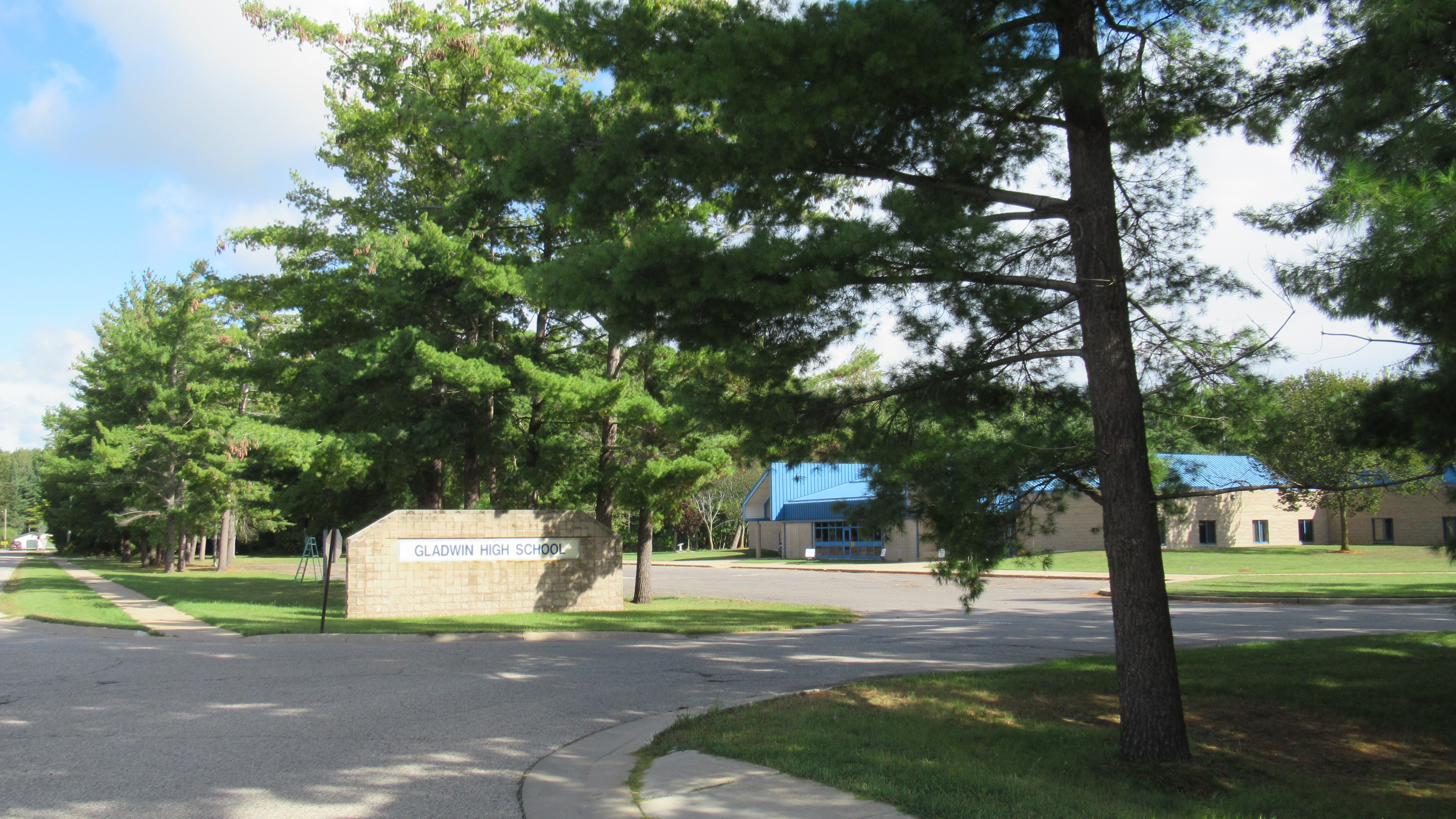
- Main entrance along N. Spring Street

Location
- 1400 North Spring Street; Gladwin, Michigan 48624; United States
- Coordinates: 43°59′34″N 84°29′39″W

Information
- Type: Public
- School district: Gladwin Community Schools
- Superintendent: Chuck Frisbie
- Principal: Elizabeth Brown
- Teaching staff: 20.15 (on an FTE basis)
- Grades: 9-12
- Enrollment: 486 (2023-2024)
- Student to teacher ratio: 24.12
- Colors: Royal Blue & White
- Nickname: Flying G's
- Rival: Beaverton High School
- Newspaper: Sparks
- Yearbook: Echo
- Website: www.gladwinschools.net/o/ghs

Gladwin High School is a public high school located at 1400 N Spring St in Gladwin, Michigan. It is the only high school in the Gladwin Community Schools district.

== Demographics ==
The demographic breakdown of the 581 students enrolled in 2015–2016 was:

- Male - 51.5%
- Female - 48.5%
- Native American/Alaskan - 0.5%
- Asian/Pacific islanders - 0.9%
- Black - 0.7%
- Hispanic - 1.2%
- White - 94.5%
- Multiracial - 2.2%

43.7% of the students were eligible for free or reduced price lunch.

== Athletics ==
The school's teams compete in the Jack Pine Conference for most of the school's sports. However, Gladwin's soccer teams compete in the Northern Michigan Soccer League. Additionally, Gladwin's hockey is played as the Mid-Michigan Storm, which is a cooperative program between Gladwin, Ogemaw Heights, Beaverton High, and Harrison High Schools. The Storm plays their home games at the Gladwin Community Arena and is part of the Northern Michigan Hockey League. Gladwin offers the following MHSAA sanctioned sports:

- Baseball (boys)
- Basketball (girls and boys)
  - Girls state champion - 1975
- Bowling (girls and boys)
  - Boys state champion - 2019, 2022
- Cross country (girls and boys)
- Football (boys)
  - State champion - 2022
- Golf (boys)
- Ice hockey (boys)
- Soccer (girls and boys)
- Softball (girls)
- Track and field (girls and boys)
- Volleyball (girls)
- Wrestling (boys)

== Notable alumni ==
- NF, rapper, singer, songwriter, and record producer.
