= Roscommon High School =

High school in Roscommon, Michigan

Location
- 10600 Oakwood Dr; Roscommon, Michigan 48653; United States
- 44.488°N 84.625°W

Information
- Type: Free public
- Motto: Excellence in Education for Everyone
- School district: Roscommon Area Public Schools
- Principal: MJ Ewald
- Faculty: 28
- Grades: 8th – 12th
- Enrollment: 356 (2023-2024)
- Campus type: Rural
- Color
- Mascot: Buck
- Website: www.rapsk12.net/page/about-rhs

Student assessments
- 2021–22 school year Change vs. prior year

M-STEP 11th grade proficiency rates (Science / Social Studies)
- Advanced %: 28.0 / 14.0
- Proficient %: 30.0 / 36.0
- PR. Proficient %: 18.0 / –
- Not Proficient %: 24.0 / ≤10

Average test scores
- SAT Total: 1040.8 (▲ +19.1)

Roscommon High School is located in Roscommon, Michigan. It is the secondary institution for the Roscommon Area Public School District. Roscommon, or RHS, is a class C/Division 3 School.

== Statistics ==
2009

- Enrollment: 440
- ACT Average Score: 21.0
- ACT Participation Rate: 44%

2005

- Drop Out Rate: 3.43%
- Graduation Rate: 87.22%

Demographics (2009)

- White: 97.9%
- Hispanic: 0.95%
- Asian/Pacific Islander: 1.13%
- Black: 0.38%
- American Indian/Alaskan: 0.95%
- Two or more races: 0%

== Athletics ==
Highlights

- 2013 MHSAA Class B Volleyball Districts Runner-Up
- 2013 Jack Pine Conference Volleyball Champions
- 2006 MHSAA Division 3 Boys' Soccer State Runner-Up
- 2006 MHSAA Division 3 Wrestling State Runner-Up
- 1989 MHSAA Class C Boys Basketball Regional Champions
- 1989 MHSAA Clas C Baseball State Semi-Finalists
- 1988 MHSAA Class C Boys' Basketball State Runner-Up
- 2001 Division 3 District Wrestling Champions
- 2002 Division 3 District Wrestling Champions
- 2003 Division 3 District Wrestling Champions
- 2004 Division 3 District Wrestling Champions
- 2005 Division 3 District Wrestling Champions
- 2006 Division 3 District Wrestling Champions
- 2007 Division 3 District Wrestling Champions
- 2008 Division 3 District Wrestling Champions
- 2009 Division 3 District Wrestling Champions
- 2010 Division 3 District Wrestling Champions
- 2011 Division 3 District Wrestling Champions
- 2012 Division 3 District Wrestling Champions
- 2013 Division 3 District Wrestling Champions
- 2012 Division 3 Regional Wrestling Champions

Teams

Boys' Sports

- Football
- Wrestling
- Basketball
- Soccer
- Track/Cross Country
- Baseball

Girls' Sports

- Girls' Soccer
- Softball
- Track/Cross Country
- Volleyball
- Basketball

Conference Affiliation
Football, wrestling, basketball, baseball, softball, golf, running, and cheerleading compete in the Highland Conference. The soccer teams compete in the Northern Michigan Soccer League.

== Other teams ==
- Forensics (Acting)
- Quiz Bowl
- Active Athletes in Action
- Youth Advisory Committee (YAC)
- Interact

== Band ==
- Marching
- Steel
- Jazz
- Symphonic Wind Ensemble

The Roscommon High School Band Program is one of the largest band programs in Northern Michigan. There are currently 88 members, ranging from grade 9 to 12. The Band makes regular appearances at band festivals for competitive band. Director Seth Kilbourn has been with the band for 18 years. In 1989 under the direction of Larry Summerix the RHS Jazz band played on the main stage at Carnegie Hall in New York City.

== Choir ==
- Women's
- Men's
- Honor's

The Roscommon Choirs have been under the direction of Emerick Dee since 2008. They have been previously directed by Doug Armstead. Throughout the years, this choir program has attended several Choral Festivals and received high enough scores to receive State qualifying rating.

== Musical ==
The Roscommon Theater Program has been ongoing under the direction of Annette Murray since 1992. The themes and levels of difficulty vary from year to year, but the show always proves to be a hit amidst community members and students. The shows are put on by the participating students who can be in grades 9-12. The cast gives three performances, one on Friday and two on Saturday.
