= Dick Lange =

American baseball player (born 1948)

- Pitcher
- Born: September 1, 1948 (age 77); Harbor Beach, Michigan, U.S.
- Batted: Right Threw: Right

MLB debut
- September 9, 1972, for the California Angels

Last MLB appearance
- September 23, 1975, for the California Angels

MLB statistics
- Win–loss record: 9–15
- Earned run average: 4.47
- Strikeouts: 137
- Stats at Baseball Reference

Teams
- California Angels (1972–1975)

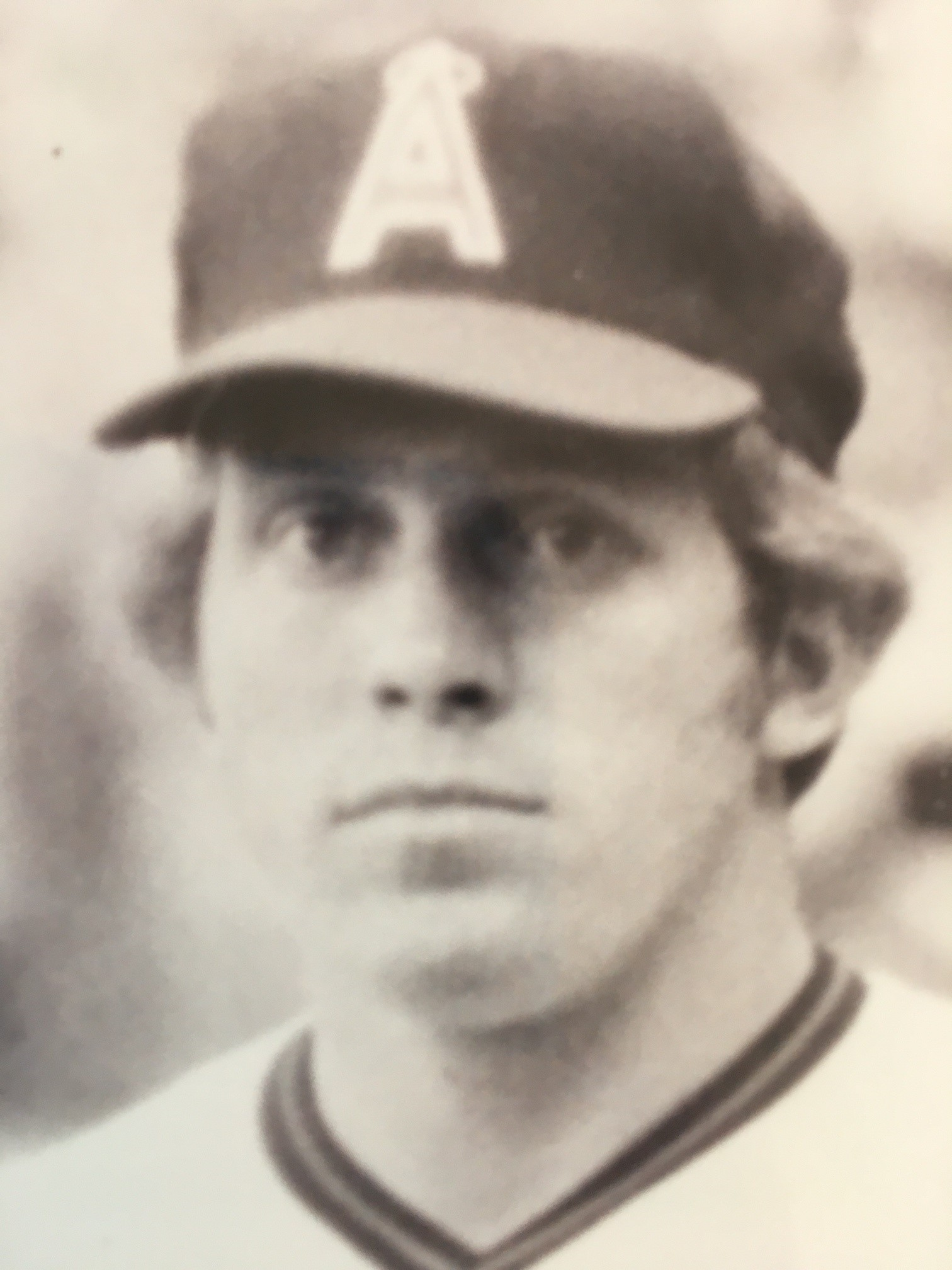
Richard "Dick" Otto Lange

Richard Otto Lange (born September 1, 1948) is an American former professional baseball pitcher who spent four seasons in Major League Baseball (MLB) with the California Angels from 1972 to 1975.

== Career ==
Lange graduated from Bullock Creek High School in Midland, MI. He attended Central Michigan University (CMU) where he was a three-year letterman with the Chippewas baseball team in 1968, 1969 and 1970. He was inducted into the CMU Athletics Hall of Fame in 1987.

He was selected by the California Angels in the 7th round (154th overall) of the 1970 MLB June Amateur Draft. He played his whole career (7 seasons) for minor and Major League Baseball teams for the California Angels.

Lange is featured in A Bitter Cup of Coffee: How MLB and the Players Association Threw 874 Retirees a Curve, a 2010 book written by Douglas J. Gladstone about the plight of 874 retired ballplayers whose major-league careers ended between 1947 and 1979 who were denied pensions because of the Major League Baseball Players Association's failure to retroactively included them as beneficiaries in the amended vesting requirements in the collective agreement that resolved the 1980 MLB strike. His three full years in the majors was one shy of qualifying for the pension requirement during his time as an active player. He was not able to earn that needed additional full year because the Angels denied him the opportunity to be selected in the 1976 MLB expansion draft by removing him from its 40-man roster and a rotator cuff tear to his throwing arm in 1977.
