= Keegan Akin =

American baseball player (born 1995)

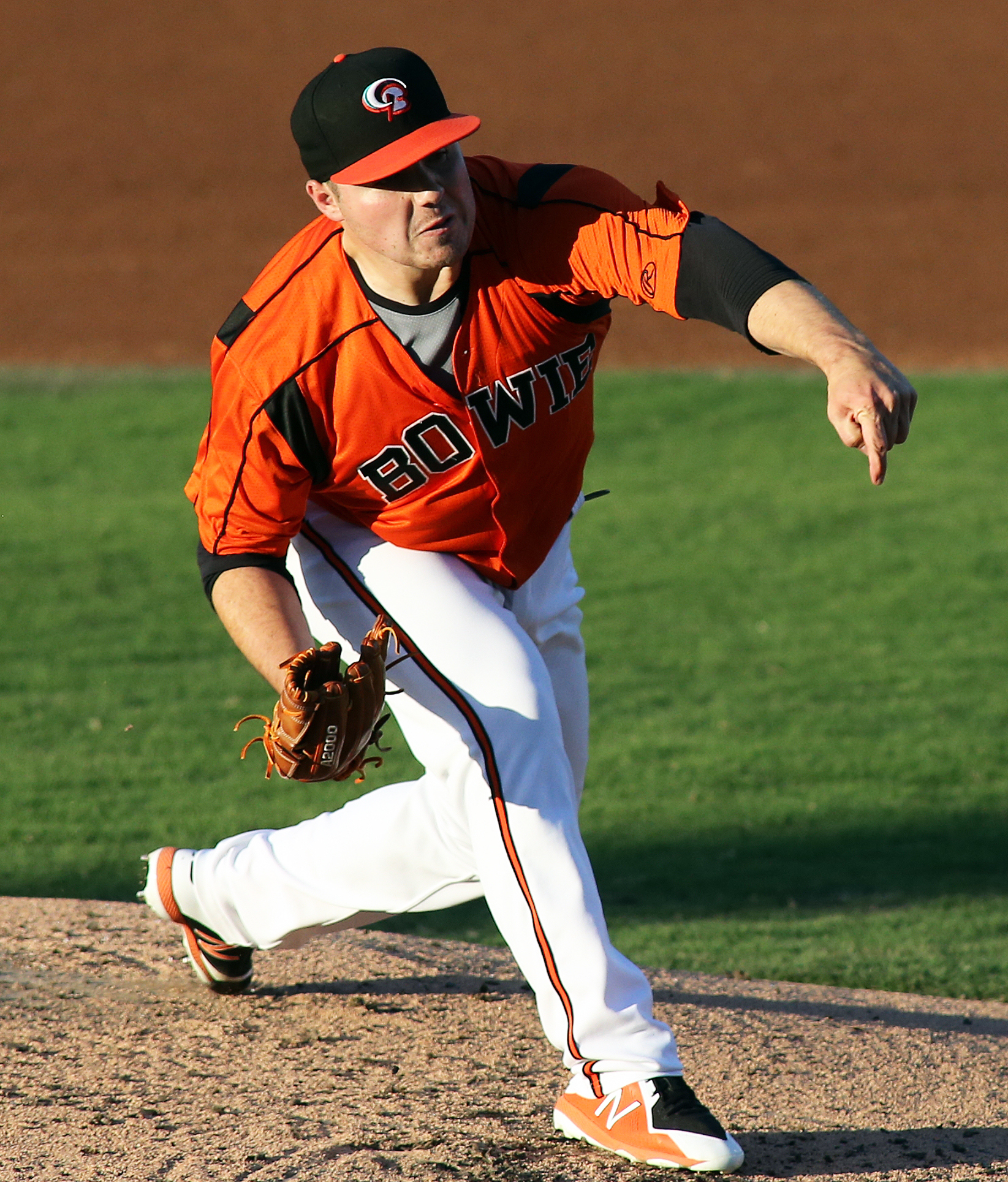
- Akin with the Bowie Baysox in 2018

Free agent
- Pitcher
- Born: April 1, 1995 (age 31); Alma, Michigan, U.S.
- Bats: Left Throws: Left

MLB debut
- August 14, 2020, for the Baltimore Orioles

MLB statistics (through 2026 season)
- Win–loss record: 16–23
- Earned run average: 4.55
- Strikeouts: 394
- Stats at Baseball Reference

Teams
- Baltimore Orioles (2020–2026)

Keegan Lee Akin (/ˈeɪkɪn/ AY-kin; born April 1, 1995) is an American professional baseball pitcher who is a free agent. He has previously played in Major League Baseball (MLB) for the Baltimore Orioles. He made his MLB debut in 2020.

== Amateur career ==
Akin attended Bullock Creek High School in Midland, Michigan, and Western Michigan University, where he played college baseball for the Western Michigan Broncos. He played collegiate summer baseball with the Chillicothe Paints of the Prospect League in 2014. In 2015, he played collegiate summer baseball with the Bourne Braves of the Cape Cod Baseball League.

== Professional career ==
=== Minor Leagues ===
The Baltimore Orioles selected Akin in the second round of the 2016 Major League Baseball draft. He signed with the Orioles, receiving a $1.17 million signing bonus. Akin made his professional debut with the Aberdeen IronBirds and spent all of 2016 there, posting a 1.04 ERA in 26 innings. He spent 2017 with the Frederick Keys where he pitched to a 7–8 record and 4.14 ERA in 21 starts, and he spent 2018 with the Bowie Baysox, going 14–7 with a 3.27 ERA in 25 starts. He spent 2019 with the Norfolk Tides, going 6–7 with a 4.73 ERA and 131 strikeouts over 112 1/3 innings.

The Orioles added Akin to their 40-man roster following the 2019 season.

=== Major leagues ===
Akin was promoted to the major leagues on August 8, 2020. He made his major league debut on August 14 against the Washington Nationals. Akin finished his first MLB season with a 1–2 record and a 4.56 ERA and 35 strikeouts over 8 games and 25.2 innings pitched.

The following season, Akin pitched to a 2–10 record and 6.63 ERA in 24 appearances for Baltimore. His season ended on September 24, when he was shut down for the remainder of the year after suffering a left adductor strain and requiring abdominal surgery. Akin had a bounce back season in 2022, making 45 appearances and posting a 3.20 ERA with 77 strikeouts and 2 saves in 81 2/3 innings pitched.

In 2023, Akin struggled to a 6.85 ERA in 24 appearances before he was placed on the injured list with lower back discomfort on June 30, 2023. He was transferred to the 60–day injured list on August 23.

In 2026, Akin struggled to a 5.68 ERA in 24 appearances before he was placed on the injured list with left elbow discomfort on June 29, 2026. He was transferred to the 60-day injured list on July 13, and underwent Tommy John surgery on July 15, ending his season.
