= Terry Wilshusen =

American baseball player (1949–2000)

- Pitcher
- Born: March 22, 1949; Atascadero, California, U.S.
- Died: December 1, 2000 (aged 51); Lomita, California, U.S.
- Batted: Right Threw: Right

MLB debut
- April 7, 1973, for the California Angels

Last MLB appearance
- April 7, 1973, for the California Angels

MLB statistics
- Innings pitched: 0.1
- Earned run average: 81.00
- Stats at Baseball Reference

Teams
- California Angels (1973)

Terry Wayne Wilshusen (March 22, 1949 – December 1, 2000) was an American professional baseball pitcher. He attended Los Angeles City College where he was selected in the 8th round of the 1968 secondary phase draft by the Detroit Tigers. He appeared in one game in Major League Baseball for the California Angels on April 7 during the 1973 California Angels season. He faced four batters, walking two and hitting one while getting just one out. All three of the batters who reached base scored, leaving Wilshusen with a career ERA of 81.00.

In 1969, Wilshusen set a California League record by recording 21 saves for the Stockton Ports. That record stood until 1982.

In 1989, Wilshusen pitched for the Orlando Juice of the Senior Professional Baseball Association.

Wilshusen's death was not reported in baseball circles until seven months later when it was mentioned in a July 2001 edition of Baseball Weekly.
