= Roscommon Area Public Schools =

School district in Michigan, United States

Address
- 299H West Sunset Drive Roscommon, Roscommon County, Michigan, 48653; United States

District information
- Motto: Inspire. Develop. Educate. Achieve.
- Grades: PreKindergarten–12
- Superintendent: Catherine Erickson
- Schools: 3
- Budget: $15,490,000 2022-2023 expenditures
- NCES District ID: 2615830

Students and staff
- Students: 791 (2024-2025)
- Teachers: 52.21 (on an FTE basis) (2024-2025)
- Staff: 125.93 FTE (2024-2025)
- Student–teacher ratio: 15.15 (2024-2025)
- District mascot: Bucks

Other information
- Website: roscommonareapsmi.sites.thrillshare.com

Roscommon Area Public School District, previously known as the Gerrish-Higgins School District is a public school district in Northern Michigan. In Roscommon County, it serves Roscommon, St. Helen, and the townships of Au Sable, Gerrish, Higgins, Lyon, and Richfield. In Crawford County, it serves South Branch Township and parts of Beaver Creek Township.

== History ==
School districts in Gerrish and Higgins Townships merged in 1930 to form Gerrish-Higgins school district. The consolidated district had the tax base to build a modern school in downtown Roscommon. Voters approved a bond issue to construct the school on June 1, 1930 and construction began that August.

The school was completed in 1931 and received additions in 1950, 1960, and 1962. It was ultimately the district's middle school before being sold in 1992.

As Roscommon High School was under construction, on February 17, 1973, a caravan of union activists went on a vandalism spree at construction sites in the area that were allegedly using non-union labor. At the high school site, construction equipment, trailers, and fuel tanks were destroyed. Five of the roughly forty men were arrested, and their conviction was upheld by the Michigan Supreme Court after the men claimed guilt by association. When the school opened in 1974, its name was officially changed from Gerrish-Higgins High School to Roscommon High School.

Enrollment grew rapidly in the late 1980s, and the middle school became overcrowded. In September 1989, voters rejected a bond issue to fund construction of a new middle school. Voters rejected the new middle school two more times before approving it in December 1991, as well as additions to St. Helen Elementary. The middle school opened in 1993. The architect was Donald E. Morgridge of Gaylord. St. Helen Elementary was sold to a charter school in 2012.

== Schools ==
Schools in the district share a campus southwest of Roscommon.

Schools in Roscommon Area Public Schools district
School	Address	Notes
Roscommon High School	10600 Oakwood, Roscommon	Grades 8–12. Built 1974.
Roscommon Middle School	299 West Sunset Drive, Roscommon	Grades 5-7. Opened fall 1993.
Roscommon Elementary	175 West Sunset Drive, Roscommon	Grades PreK-4.
