= Clare High School =

Public school in Michigan, United States

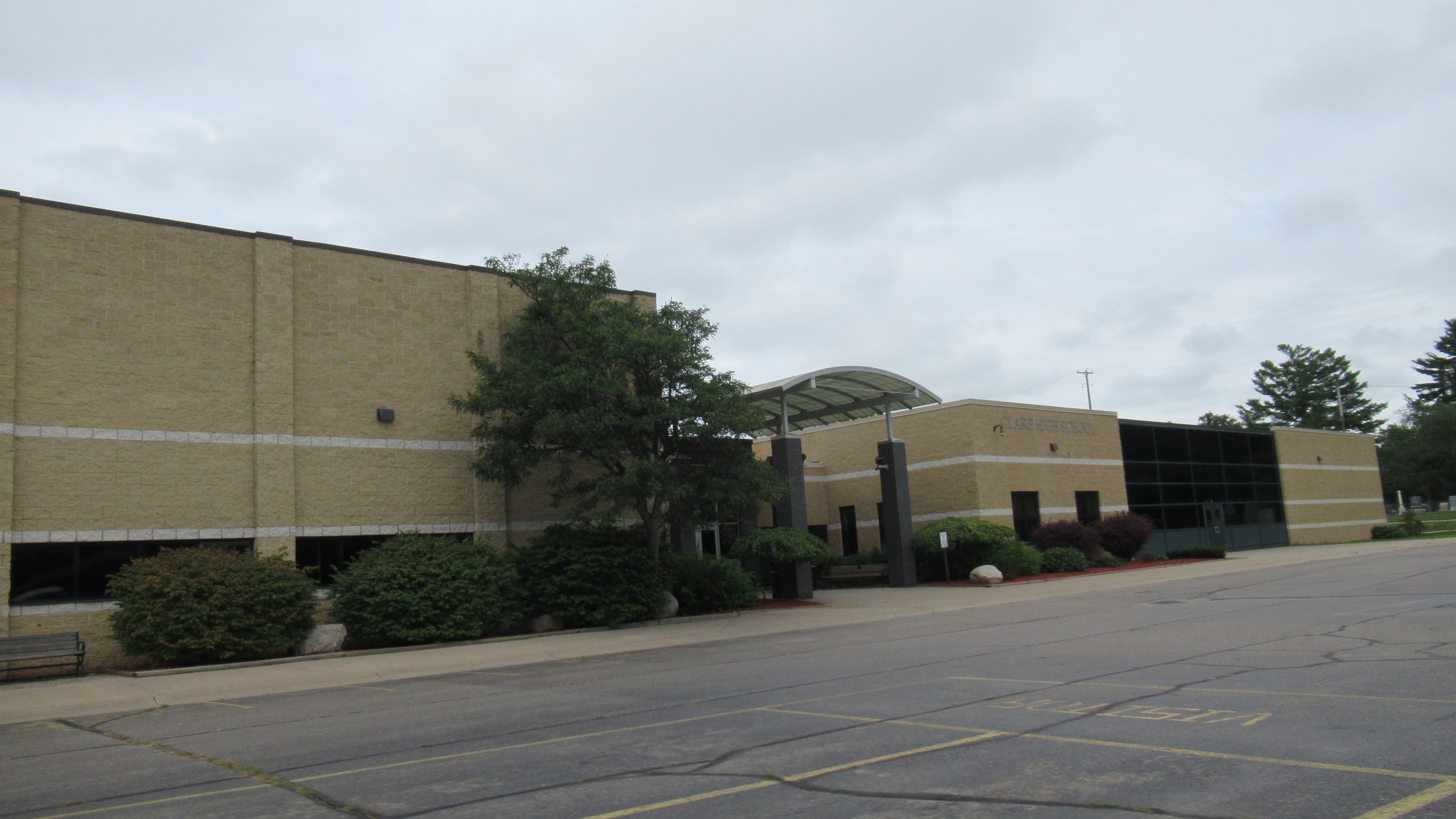

Location
- 306 Schoolcrest Ave; Clare, Michigan 48617; United States; 43°49′29″N 84°45′44″W

Information
- Type: Public secondary
- Established: 1903
- School district: Clare Public Schools
- Principal: Matt Forsberg
- Teaching staff: 27.29 (FTE)
- Grades: 9–12
- Enrollment: 482 (2023–2024)
- Student to teacher ratio: 17.66
- Campus: Rural
- Colors: Green and White
- Mascot: Pioneers
- School hours: 8:15 AM to 3:09 PM
- Average class size: 98
- School motto: "Pioneers in Education"
- Website: clare.k12.mi.us

Clare High School is a secondary school located at 201 E. State St. in Clare, Michigan, United States.

== Demographics ==
Clare High School is 92% White, 2% Black, 2% Asian, 4% Hispanic. In recent years Clare High School has seen an increase in racial diversity with immigrants coming from Asia, Europe, and Latin America. Some countries represented in the school are China, Bolivia, Mexico, Poland, Germany, Russia, Italy, Myanmar (Burma), Canada, Dominican Republic.

- Currently 38% percent of the school's population receives free or reduced lunch.
- 53% is boys and 47% is girls

== Athletics ==
Some sports that Clare High offers are soccer, baseball, basketball, volleyball, football, bowling, track and field, cross country running, golf, wrestling, skiing, and marching band. Clare has been a member of the Jack Pine Conference since 1982.

== JPC Championships ==
Jack Pine Championships
Sport	Years
Football	1985 1991 1992 1996 2000 2001 2002 2003 2004 2007 2008 2009* 2010 2011 2012 2014 2016 2017 2018 2019
Boys' Basketball	1987 1993 2010 2012
Girls' Basketball	2001 2002 2004 2005 2008 2011 2012 2013 2014 2017 2020
Boys' CC	1991 1992 1993 1994 1995 1996 2008 2009 2010 2011 2012 2013 2014 2015 2016 2017 2018
Girls' CC	1991 1992 1993 1994 1995 1996 1997 2000 2001 2002 2003 2004 2005 2006 2007 2008 2010 2011 2012 2013 2014 2015 2016 2017 2018 2019
Boys' Track	1983 1986 1987 1988 1989 1992 1995 1996 1997 1998 1999 2000 2001 2002 2004 2005 2006 2007 2008 2011 2014 2015 2016 2017 2018 2019
Girls' Track	1983 1985 1992 1993 1994 1995 1996 1999 2001 2002 2003 2004 2005 2006 2007 2011 2014 2015 2016 2017 2018 2019
Volleyball	2001
Girls' Bowling	2020
Baseball	1988 1989 1991 1992 1999 2001 2002 2003 2008 2009 2010 2011 2012 2016 2017
Softball	1986 2004 2005 2014
All-Sport	1986-87 1988-89 1991-92 1992-93 1993-94 1994-95 1995-96 1996-97 1997-98 1998-99 2000-01 2001-02 2002-03 2003-04 2004-05 2007-08 2008-09 2009-10 2010-11 2011-12 2012-13 2013-14 2014-15 2015-16 2016-17 2017-2018 2018-19 2019-20

*MHSAA Runner up

== Rivals ==
Clare's biggest rival in recent years is Gladwin High School located in Gladwin. Historically, their rivals have been Harrison High School and Farwell High School.

== Notable alumni ==
- Gloria Sickal Gaither - composer of Christian music; member of the Bill Gaither Trio
- Debbie Stabenow - United States Senator from Michigan since 2001.
