= Au Sable Township, Roscommon County, Michigan =

Au Sable Township, Michigan
- Civil township
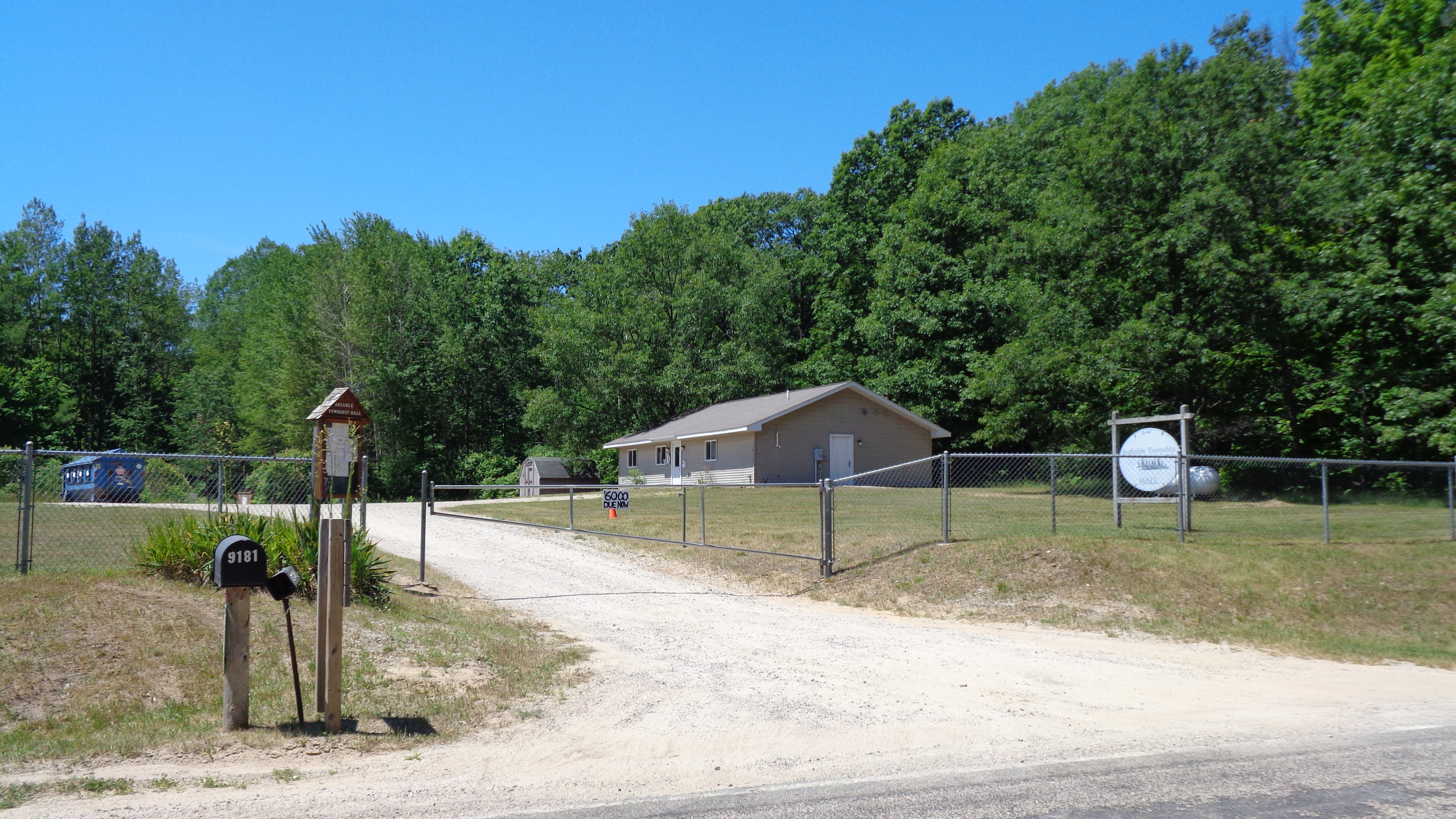
- Au Sable Township Hall

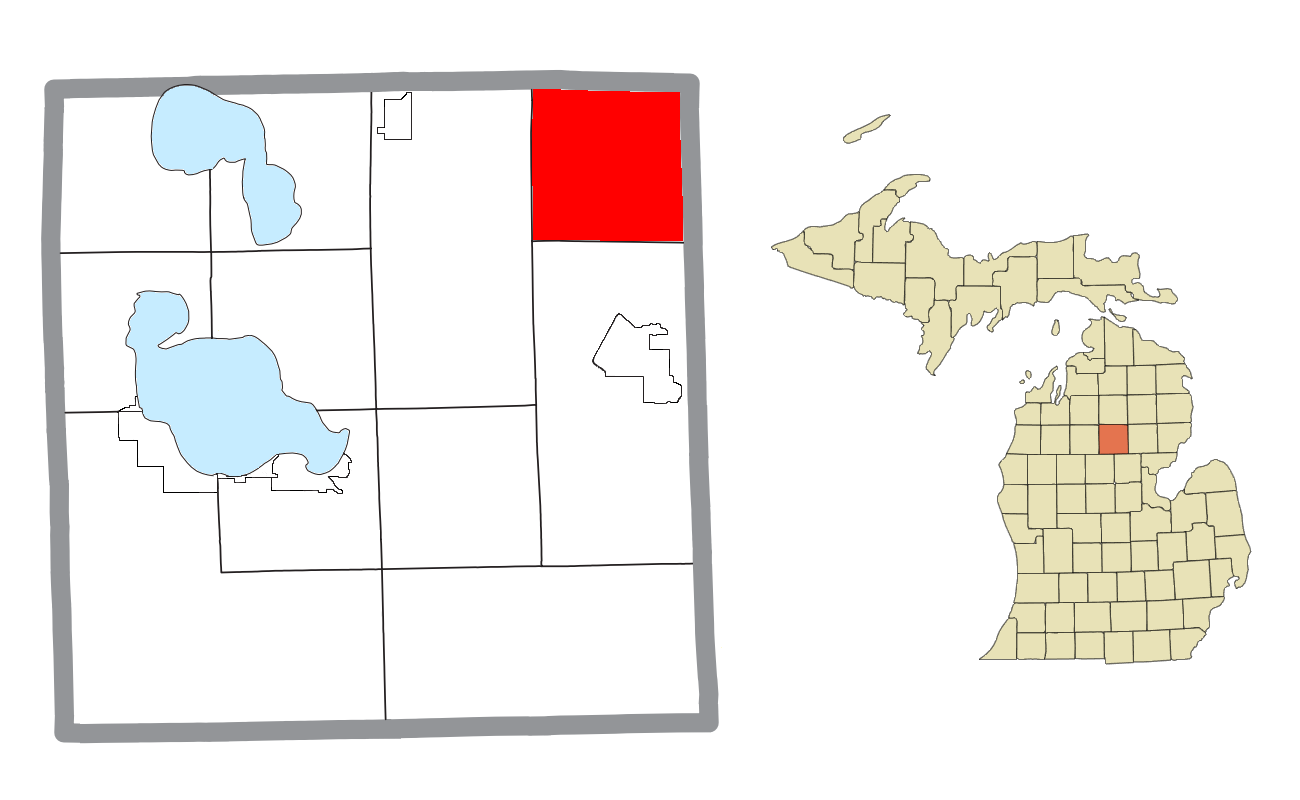
- Location within Roscommon County

- Location within the state of Michigan Au Sable Township (the United States)
- Coordinates: 44°27′17″N 84°26′27″W
- Country: United States
- State: Michigan
- County: Roscommon
- Established: 1947

Government
  - Supervisor: Kurtis Norton
  - Clerk: Ron Watson

Area
  - Total: 35.78 sq mi (92.67 km^{2})
  - Land: 35.66 sq mi (92.36 km^{2})
  - Water: 0.12 sq mi (0.31 km^{2})
- Elevation: 1,150 ft (350 m)

Population (2020)
  - Total: 236
  - Density: 6.62/sq mi (2.56/km^{2})
- Time zone: UTC-5 (Eastern (EST))
  - Summer (DST): UTC-4 (EDT)
- ZIP code(s): 48653 (Roscommon); 48656 (St. Helen)
- Area code: 989
- FIPS code: 26-04320
- GNIS feature ID: 1625866
- Website: Official website

Au Sable Township is a civil township of Roscommon County in the U.S. state of Michigan. The population was 236 at the 2020 census, which makes it the county's least-populated municipality.

== Communities ==
- Herbert is a former settlement located within the township. It began as a lumber settlement, and a post office was established on May 22, 1902. It was named after the son of early settler James Nolan. The post office operated until September 13, 1910, and was then transferred to Keno. The community appears within Richfield Township in a 1916 map of Roscommon County. Its location is now within present-day Au Sable Township, which was established in 1947 long after the community disappeared.
- Keno is an unincorporated community near the center of the township along St. Helen Road at 44°28′20″N 84°24′38″W. The community was also originally known as Hard Scramble. A post office named Herbert was established on May 22, 1902, and renamed to Keno on November 5, 1910. The post office was discontinued on December 15, 1925.

== History ==
Au Sable Township was established in 1947 from the northern 36-square-mile (93.2 km^{2}) survey township area of Richfield Township. It was named after the southern branch of the Au Sable River, which flows through the township.

== Geography ==
According to the U.S. Census Bureau, the township has a total area of 35.78 square miles (92.67 km^{2}), of which 35.66 square miles (92.36 km^{2}) is land and 0.12 square miles (0.31 km^{2}) (0.33%) is water.

=== Major highways ===
- M-18 (North M-18) forms a brief portion of the northwestern boundary of the township with Crawford County.
- F-97 (North St. Helen Road) runs south–north through the center of the township.
- M-76 (Old M-76) is a former state highway that was commissioned from 1919 to 1973. The roadway passes briefly through the southwest corner of the township.

== Demographics ==
As of the census of 2000, there were 281 people, 110 households, and 76 families residing in the township. The population density was 7.9 inhabitants per square mile (3.1/km^{2}). There were 201 housing units at an average density of 5.6 per square mile (2.2/km^{2}). The racial makeup of the township was 100.00% White.

There were 110 households, out of which 23.6% had children under the age of 18 living with them, 60.9% were married couples living together, 4.5% had a female householder with no husband present, and 30.9% were non-families. 23.6% of all households were made up of individuals, and 9.1% had someone living alone who was 65 years of age or older. The average household size was 2.55 and the average family size was 2.99.

In the township the population was spread out, with 24.6% under the age of 18, 3.2% from 18 to 24, 24.6% from 25 to 44, 30.2% from 45 to 64, and 17.4% who were 65 years of age or older. The median age was 44 years. For every 100 females, there were 106.6 males. For every 100 females age 18 and over, there were 109.9 males.

The median income for a household in the township was $30,000, and the median income for a family was $29,375. Males had a median income of $30,083 versus $29,063 for females. The per capita income for the township was $13,651. About 17.3% of families and 23.9% of the population were below the poverty line, including 40.0% of those under the age of eighteen and 20.0% of those 65 or over.

== Education ==
Au Sable Township is served entirely by Roscommon Area Public Schools to the west in Gerrish Township.

The township was once home to the main campus of Kirtland Community College, which was founded in 1966. In 2016, the college moved its location to Grayling Township slightly to the north in Crawford County.
