= Bullock Creek High School =

Location
- 1420 S Badour Rd; Midland, Michigan 48640; United States; 43°34′12″N 84°17′36″W

Information
- Motto: "It's A Great Day To Be A Lancer!"
- School district: Bullock Creek Public Schools
- Superintendent: Shawn J. Hale
- Principal: Curt Moses
- Teaching staff: 27.20 (FTE)
- Grades: 9, 10, 11 & 12
- Enrollment: 481 (2023–2024)
- Student to teacher ratio: 17.68
- Colors: Black; Vegas Gold
- Athletics conference: Tri-Valley Conference
- Nickname: Lancers
- Rival: Meridian High School
- Newspaper: (former) The Lancer Link
- Yearbook: The Lancer Shield
- Website: School website

Bullock Creek High School is a grade 9 through 12 public high school six miles southwest of Midland, Michigan in Homer Township. It is part of the Bullock Creek Public Schools District.

== Athletics ==
The Bullock Creek athletic teams are known as the Lancers and the school colors are black and gold. The Lancers compete in the Tri-Valley Conference. Bullock Creek High School has been a member of the Tri-Valley Conference since 1979.

The following MHSAA sanctioned sports are offered at Bullock Creek High School:

- Cross Country (girls & boys)
- Football (boys)
- Soccer (boys and girls)
- Tennis (boys and girls)
- Volleyball (girls)
- Basketball (girls & boys)
- Bowling (girls & boys)
- Competitive Cheerleading (girls)
- Wrestling (boys)
- Baseball (boys)
- Golf (girls & boys)
- Softball (girls)
- Track & field (girls & boys)

== Notable alumni ==
- Keegan Akin, Major League Baseball pitcher
- Dick Lange, former Major League Baseball pitcher
