= Bob Allietta =

American baseball player (born 1952)

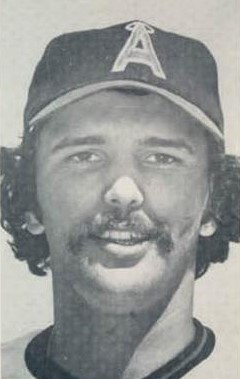
- Catcher
- Born: May 1, 1952 (age 74); New Bedford, Massachusetts, U.S.
- Batted: Right Threw: Right

MLB debut
- May 6, 1975, for the California Angels

Last MLB appearance
- September 28, 1975, for the California Angels

MLB statistics
- Batting average: .178
- Home runs: 1
- Runs batted in: 2
- Stats at Baseball Reference

Teams
- California Angels (1975)

Robert George Allietta (born May 1, 1952) is an American former Major League Baseball catcher who played for the California Angels in 1975.

== Amateur career ==
A native of New Bedford, Massachusetts, Allietta graduated from Lawrence High School in Falmouth, Massachusetts, and was selected by the St. Louis Cardinals in the 8th round of the June 1970 MLB draft. He opted to play college baseball for the University of Massachusetts Lowell, and in 1970, Allietta played collegiate summer baseball for the Falmouth Commodores of the Cape Cod Baseball League (CCBL). Allietta was selected by the California Angels in the first round (seventh pick) of the 1971 MLB draft (secondary phase).

== Professional career ==
While in the Angels' minor league system, Allietta led California League catchers with 12 double plays while playing for the Stockton Ports in 1972. He made his major league debut for the Angels on May 6, 1975, at the Oakland–Alameda County Coliseum. Allietta was the starting catcher that night against the Oakland Athletics, and went 0-for-2 against Ken Holtzman. In the top of the 7th, Rollie Fingers was called in to face Allietta, and Bill Sudakis pinch hit for him.

Allietta was on the disabled list that from July 6 to August 17 of 1975, limiting his playing time to 21 games in his only big-league season. Season and career totals include a .178 batting average (8-for-45), one home run, two runs batted in, and four runs scored. He was excellent on defense, handling 98 chances without an error, and had just one passed ball in 122 innings caught. He also threw out four of 16 baserunners attempting to steal.

== Coaching career ==
Allietta returned to the CCBL as Falmouth's field manager for the 1983 season.
