= Rudy Meoli =

American baseball player (born 1951)

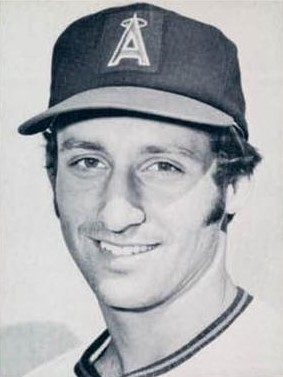
- Shortstop
- Born: May 1, 1951 (age 75); Troy, New York, U.S.
- Batted: Left Threw: Right

MLB debut
- September 9, 1971, for the California Angels

Last MLB appearance
- June 8, 1979, for the Philadelphia Phillies

MLB statistics
- Batting average: .212
- Home runs: 2
- Runs batted in: 40
- Stats at Baseball Reference

Teams
- California Angels (1971, 1973–1975); Chicago Cubs (1978); Philadelphia Phillies (1979)

Rudolph Bartholomew Meoli (born May 1, 1951) is an American former professional baseball player who appeared in 310 games over all or parts of six seasons in Major League Baseball for the California Angels (1971, 1973–1975), Chicago Cubs (1978) and Philadelphia Phillies (1979). An infielder, he played in 147 games as a shortstop, 54 as a third baseman and 41 as a second baseman. Meoli is a native of Troy, New York, who batted left-handed, threw right-handed, and was listed as 5 feet 9 inches (1.75 m) tall and 165 pounds (75 kg).

Meoli's pro career began when the Angels selected him in the fourth round of the 1969 Major League Baseball draft after his graduation from Royal Oak High School in Covina, California. After a cursory, late-season MLB trial in September 1971, Meoli made the 1973 Angels as a utility infielder, starting three games at third base and backing up Bobby Valentine as the club's shortstop during the season's early weeks. Meoli joined the Angel starting lineup at shortstop on May 13 when the versatile Valentine moved to center field. A catastrophic leg injury sustained as he was playing the outfield ended Valentine's season May 17, and solidified rookie Meoli's starting job. He played in a career-high 120 games during 1973, starting 87 at shortstop, and set personal bests in hits (68) and runs batted in (23). He also swatted what would be his only two big-league home runs, off Joe Coleman July 14, then off Gene Garber two weeks later. In the latter game, Meoli drove in six runs with his three hits, leading the Angels to a 19–8 thrashing of the Kansas City Royals.

In 1974, Dave Chalk took over as the Angels' shortstop. Meoli appeared in 106 big-league games over the next two seasons, spending part of 1974 in Triple-A. He was traded to the San Diego Padres after the 1975 campaign, and spent all of 1976 and 1977 in the Cincinnati Reds' minor-league system before returning to the majors as a utility man for parts of 1978 and 1979 with the Cubs and Phillies.

During his MLB service, Meoli collected a total of 133 hits, with 20 doubles and four triples to accompany his two 1973 homers. His career batting average was .212, with 40 runs batted in. He retired from baseball after the 1979 campaign and 11 pro seasons.
