= Homer Township, Midland County, Michigan =

Homer Township, Michigan
- Civil township
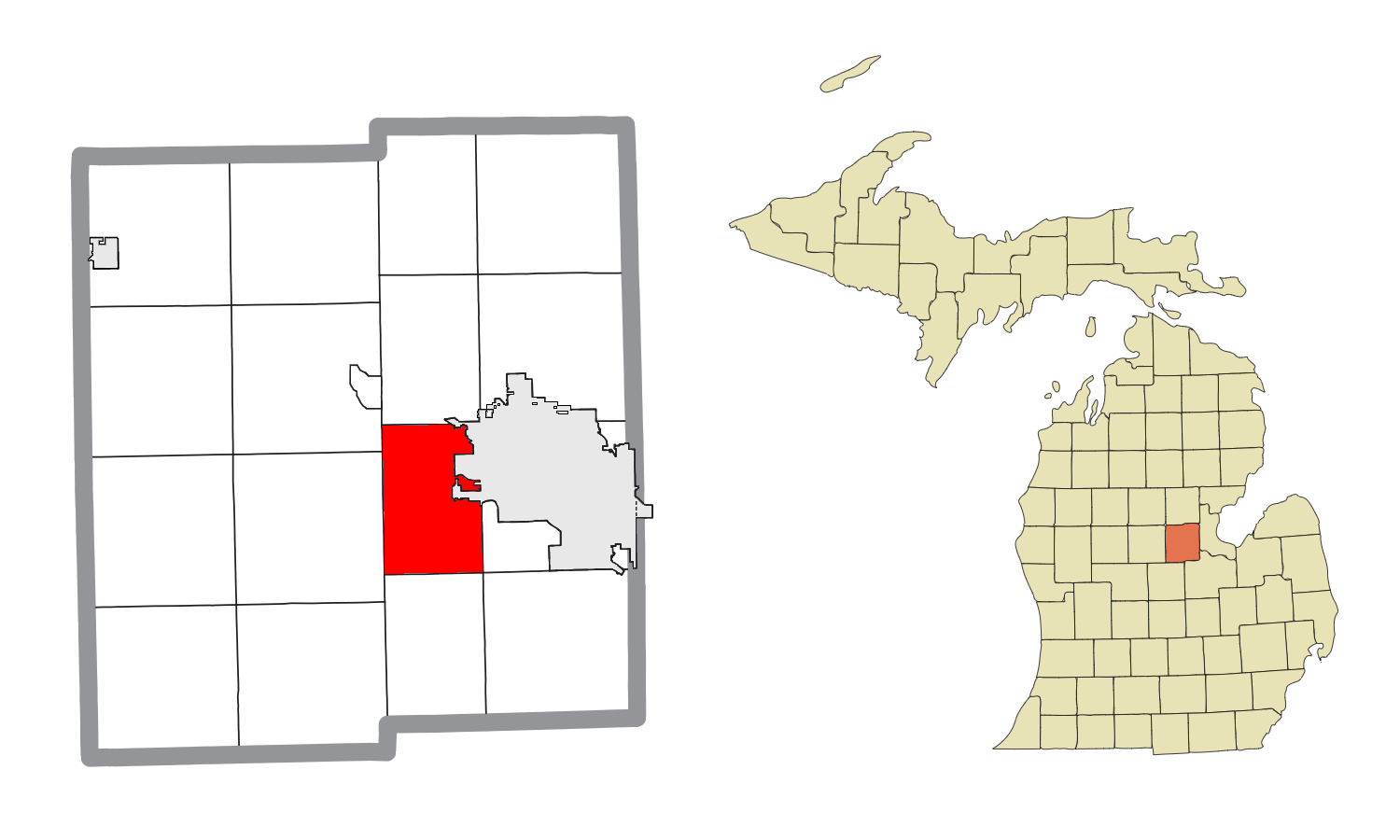
- Location within Midland County and the state of Michigan

- Location within Michigan Location within the United States
- Coordinates: 43°36′42″N 84°19′45″W
- Country: United States
- State: Michigan
- County: Midland
- Established: 1862

Government
  - Supervisor: Russell Varner
  - Clerk: Todd Lee

Area
  - Total: 21.3 sq mi (55 km^{2})
  - Land: 20.9 sq mi (54 km^{2})
  - Water: 0.4 sq mi (1.0 km^{2})
- Elevation: 630 ft (192 m)

Population (2020)
  - Total: 3,993
  - Density: 191.3/sq mi (73.9/km^{2})
- Time zone: UTC-5 (Eastern (EST))
  - Summer (DST): UTC-4 (EDT)
- ZIP Codes: 48640, 48642 (Midland); 48657 (Sanford)
- Area code: 989
- FIPS code: 26-111-38980
- GNIS feature ID: 1626486
- Website: www.homertownship.org

Homer Township is a civil township of Midland County in the U.S. state of Michigan. As of the 2020 census, the township population was 3,993.

== Geography ==
The township is in central Midland County and is bordered to the northeast by the city of Midland, the county seat. According to the United States Census Bureau, the township has a total area of 21.3 square miles (55 km^{2}), of which 20.9 square miles (54 km^{2}) are land and 0.4 square miles (1.0 km^{2}), or 1.88%, are water. The Tittabawassee River crosses the northeast part of the township, and its tributary, the Chippewa River, crosses the center of the township. The Pine River, a tributary of the Chippewa, drains the southern part of the township.

== Demographics ==
Historical population
| Census | Pop. | Note | %± |
|---|---|---|---|
| 1870 | 247 | | — |
| 1880 | 601 | | 143.3% |
| 1890 | 552 | | −8.2% |
| 1900 | 657 | | 19.0% |
| 1910 | 570 | | −13.2% |
| 1920 | 598 | | 4.9% |
| 1930 | 754 | | 26.1% |
| 1940 | 1,467 | | 94.6% |
| 1950 | 2,196 | | 49.7% |
| 1960 | 3,304 | | 50.5% |
| 1970 | 3,959 | | 19.8% |
| 1980 | 4,477 | | 13.1% |
| 1990 | 4,235 | | −5.4% |
| 2000 | 3,924 | | −7.3% |
| 2010 | 4,009 | | 2.2% |
| 2020 | 3,993 | | −0.4% |
U.S. Decennial Census

As of the census of 2010, there were 4,009 people, 1,521 households, and 1,182 families residing in the township. The population density was 185.6 inhabitants per square mile (71.7/km^{2}). There were 1,593 housing units at an average density of 73.8 per square mile (28.5/km^{2}). The racial makeup of the township was 96.68% White, 0.64% African American, 0.62% Native American, 0.5% Asian, 0.02% Pacific Islander, 0.12% from other races, and 1.4% from two or more races. Hispanic or Latino of any race were 1.55% of the population.

There were 1,521 households, out of which 31.1% had children under the age of 18 living with them, 64.7% were married couples living together, 8.3% had a female householder with no husband present, and 22.3% were non-families. 17.0% of all households were made up of individuals, and 6.2% had someone living alone who was 65 years of age or older. The average household size was 2.6 and the average family size was 2.9.

In 2000, the township the population was spread out, with 27.0% under the age of 18, 7.0% from 18 to 24, 29.8% from 25 to 44, 24.8% from 45 to 64, and 11.4% who were 65 years of age or older. The median age was 37 years. For every 100 females, there were 96.9 males. For every 100 females age 18 and over, there were 96.6 males.

The median income for a household in the township was $44,924, and the median income for a family was $51,029. Males had a median income of $45,742 versus $28,622 for females. The per capita income for the township was $20,574. About 5.7% of families and 5.7% of the population were below the poverty line, including 3.9% of those under age 18 and 9.7% of those age 65 or over.

== Transportation ==
- M-20 connects Midland to the east with Mount Pleasant and Big Rapids to the west.
- M-30 follows the Michigan meridian along the western boundary of the township, extending north to West Branch.

== Education ==
- Bullock Creek Public Schools
  - Bullock Creek High School
- Midland Public Schools

== Sites of interest ==
The Chippewa Nature Center has a territory of more than 1,000 acres (400 ha) of deciduous and coniferous woods, rivers, ponds, wetlands (marsh, fen, bog, and swamp) and upland fields.
