= Dan Briggs (baseball) =

American baseball player (born 1952)

- First baseman / Outfielder
- Born: November 18, 1952 (age 72); Scotia, California, U.S.
- Batted: Left Threw: Left

Professional debut
- MLB: September 10, 1975, for the California Angels
- NPB: July 30, 1982, for the Yakult Swallows

Last appearance
- MLB: July 3, 1982, for the Chicago Cubs
- NPB: October 24, 1983, for the Yakult Swallows

MLB statistics
- Batting average: .195
- Home runs: 12
- Runs batted in: 53

NPB statistics
- Batting average: .258
- Home runs: 18
- Runs batted in: 68
- Stats at Baseball Reference

Teams
- California Angels (1975–1977); Cleveland Indians (1978); San Diego Padres (1979); Montreal Expos (1981); Chicago Cubs (1982); Yakult Swallows (1982–1983)

Dan Lee Briggs (born November 18, 1952) is an American former professional baseball player. He played seven seasons for the California Angels, Cleveland Indians, San Diego Padres, Montreal Expos, and Chicago Cubs of Major League Baseball. He also played one season and part of another in Japan with the Yakult Swallows.
